= 2008 New Progressive Party of Puerto Rico primaries =

New Progressive Party primaries, 2008
- March 9, 2008
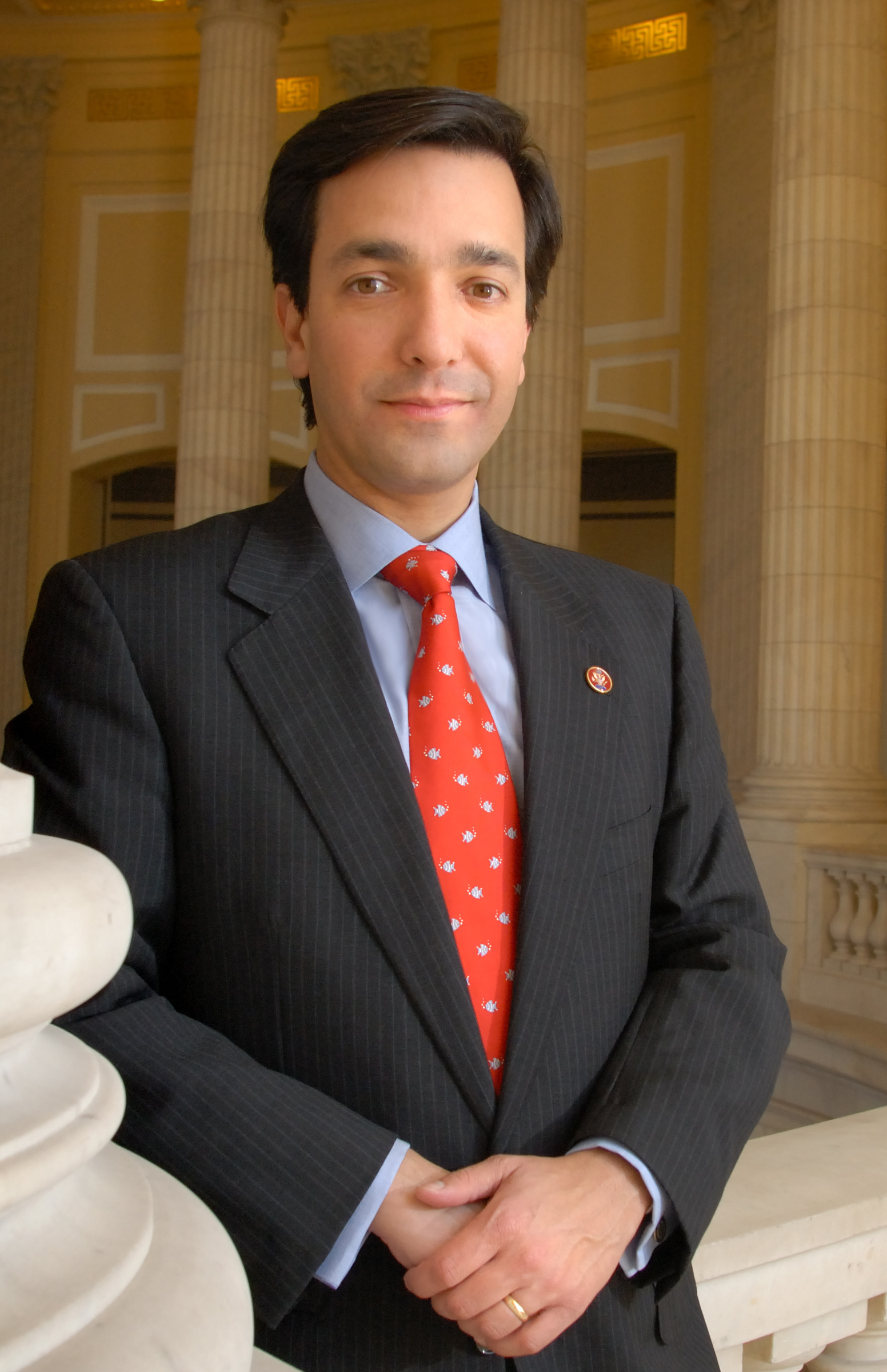

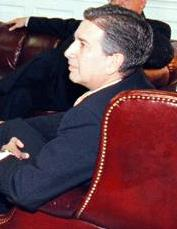
Nominee	Luis Fortuño	Pedro Rosselló
Party	New Progressive	New Progressive
Alliance	Republican	Democratic
Popular vote	445,026	306,590
Percentage	59.21%	40.79%
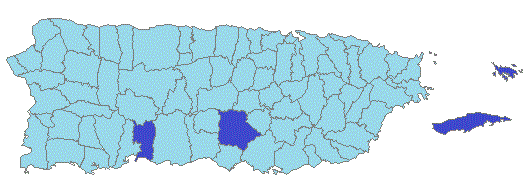
- New Progressive Party results for Governor. Light blue denotes a Fortuño win and navy blue a Rosselló win.
Previous PNP Governor candidate
Pedro Rosselló
PNP Governor candidate-elect
Luis Fortuño

The 2008 New Progressive Party primaries were the primary elections by which voters of the New Progressive Party (PNP) chose its nominees for various political offices of Puerto Rico, namely the position of governor, for the 2008 general elections. Resident Commissioner Luis Fortuño was selected as the nominee at the primary elections held on March 9, 2008. He would go on to win the 2008 general election as well.

== Background ==
Pedro Rosselló had come from a defeat against Aníbal Acevedo Vilá at the 2004 elections. Despite that, he managed to gain a seat in the Senate. After an unsuccessful power struggle within the Senate to gain the presidency of the body, it was speculated that Rosselló would make another attempt at being elected Governor for the 2008 elections.

The power struggle had caused a division within the party, with the faction that supported Senate President Kenneth McClintock (called the "Auténticos") being expelled from the party during the previous year. Although the Supreme Court allowed them to run in the PNP primaries, Pedro Rosselló, then President of the party, still vouched for a "vote of punishment" against the senators, which he called "traitors".

== Candidates ==
=== Governor ===
- Luis Fortuño, incumbent Resident Commissioner of Puerto Rico
- Pedro Rosselló, incumbent Senator and former Governor of Puerto Rico

=== Resident Commissioner ===
- Pedro Pierluisi, former Secretary of Justice
- Charlie Rodríguez, former President of the Senate of Puerto Rico
- Miriam Ramírez de Ferrer, former Senator
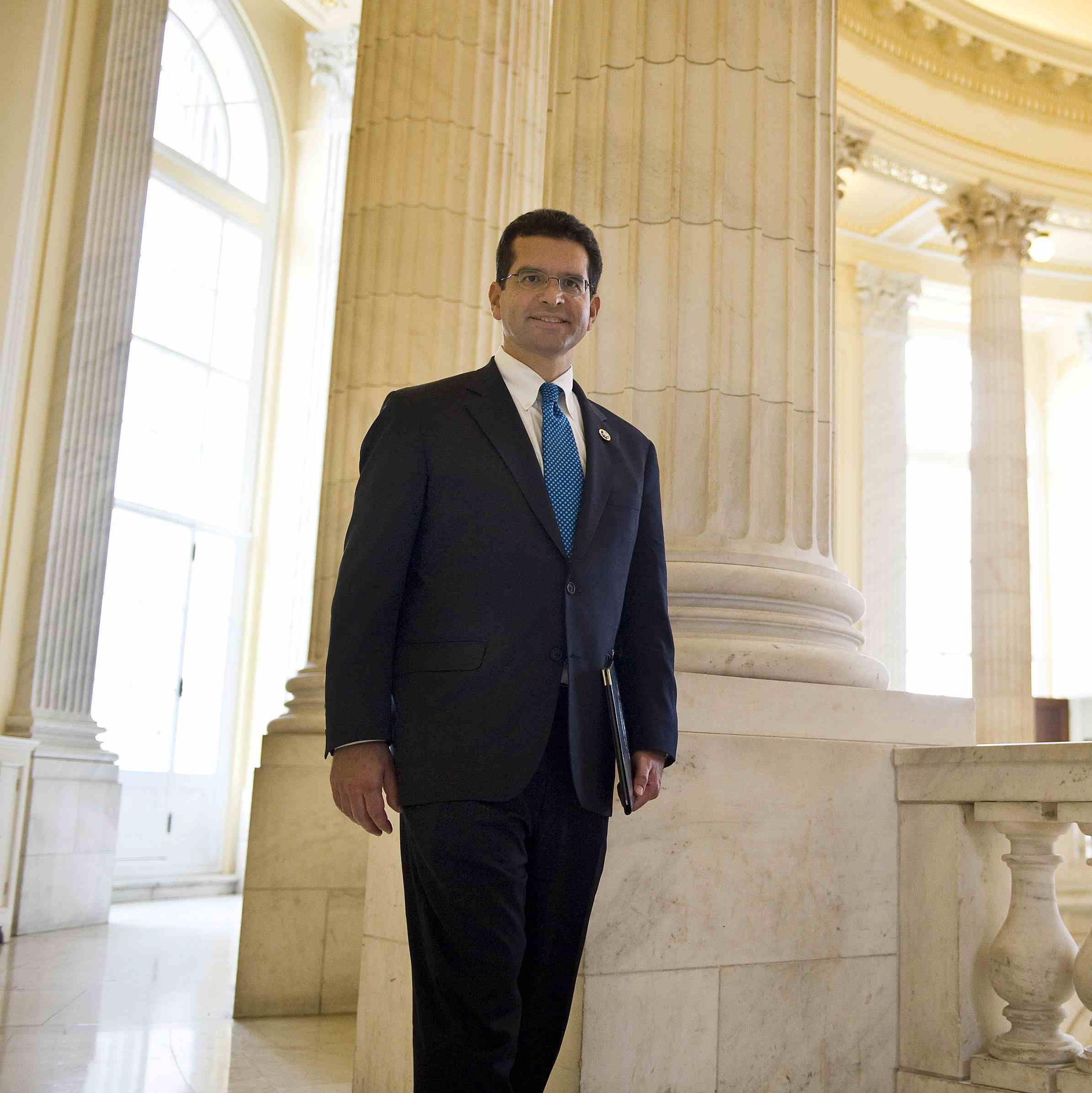
Pedro Pierluisi

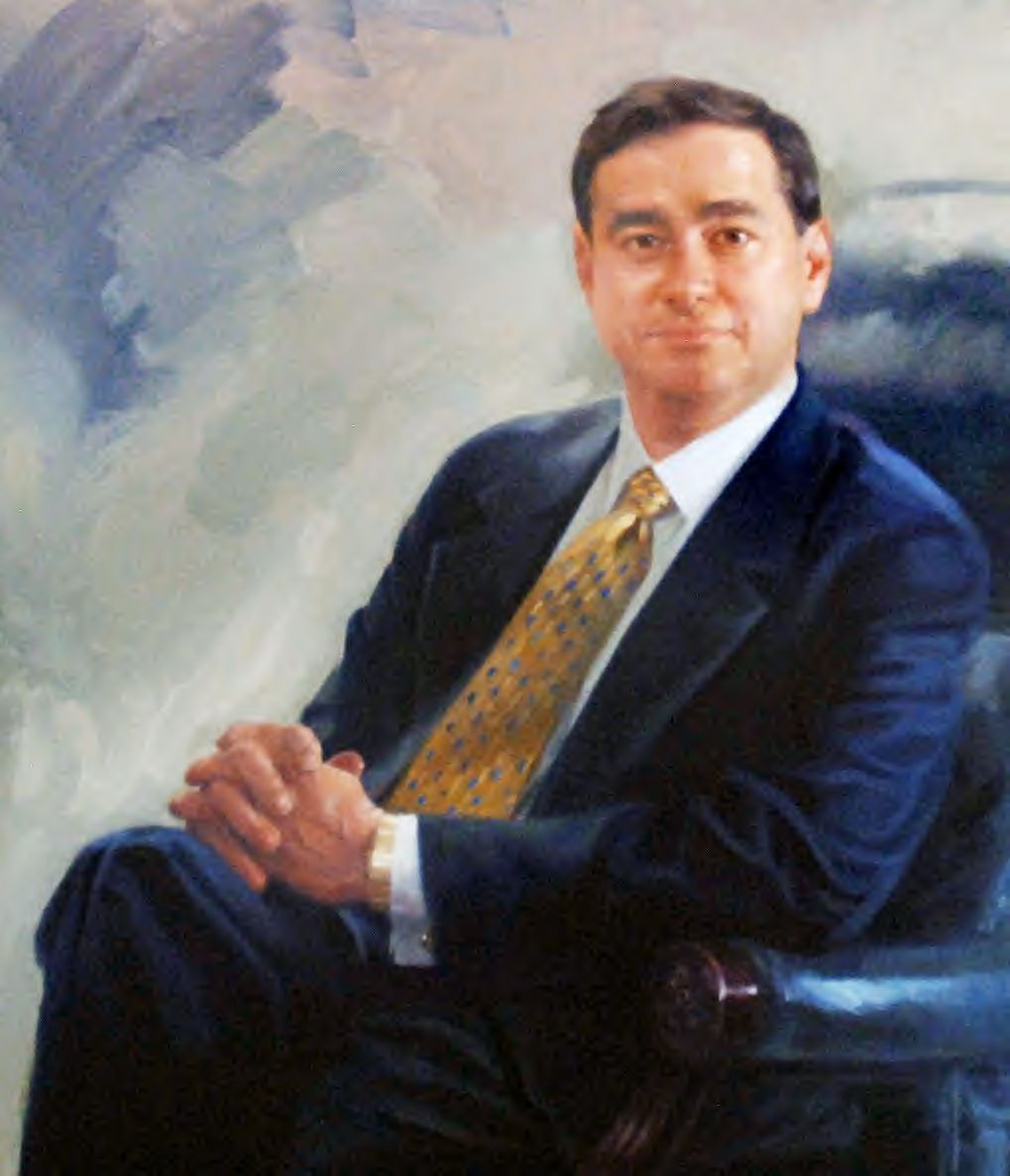
Charlie Rodríguez

Miriam Ramírez de Ferrer

=== Senate ===
==== At-large ====
- Wanda Aponte
- Lucy Arce
- Luis Batista Salas
- Cristóbal Berríos
- Norma Burgos
- Luis Oscar Casillas
- Jorge de Castro Font
- Manuel de Jesús
- José Garriga Picó
- Roger Iglesias
- Tito Maldonado
- Roberto Carlos Mejill
- Henry Neumann
- Margarita Nolasco
- Reynaldo Paniagua
- Itzamar Peña
- Abid Quiñones
- Oreste Ramos
- Santos Ramos Lugo
- Thomas Rivera Schatz
- Orlando José Rivera Sepúlveda
- Luz M. "Tuty" Silva
- William Villafañe

==== District ====
The New Progressive Party held primaries on all 8 of the senatorial districts.

===== San Juan =====
- Roberto Arango
- Carlos Díaz
- Omar Miranda Torres
- Edward Moreno
- Kimmey Raschke

===== Bayamón =====
- Felix H. Delgado
- Héctor "Cano" O'Neill
- Pedro Orraca
- Migdalia Padilla
- Carmelo Ríos Santiago
- Edwin Rivera
- Noel Toro

===== Arecibo =====
- José Emilio González Velázquez
- Anthony López
- Johnny Maldonado
- Víctor "Buhito" Marrero
- Angel Martínez Santiago
- Roger Owens
- Gabriel Félix Rivera
- Alexis Valle

===== Mayagüez-Aguadilla =====
- Luis Daniel Muñiz Cortes
- Michael Nazario
- Carlos Pagán
- Jorge Rodríguez Feliciano
- Evelyn Vázquez

===== Ponce =====
- María Alvarado
- Luis A. Berdiel Rivera
- Juan Luis "Cuto" Colón
- Benny A. Morales
- Ramoncito Ramos
- Larry Seilhamer
- Luinel Torres Acosta

===== Guayama =====
- Osvaldo Colón Reyes
- Paco Fontánez
- Miguelito Martínez
- "Vi" Negrón
- Osvaldo Ortolaza Figueroa
- Luisito Pagán
- Robert Santiago
- Antonio Soto Díaz
- Carlos J. Torres Torres

===== Humacao =====
- Juan B.
- José R. Díaz Hernández
- Francisco "Paco" Pereira
- Luz M. Santiago González
- Rafi Uceta

===== Carolina =====
- Haydee Calderón Muñoz
- Héctor Martínez Maldonado
- Rosemary O'Connell
- Pablo Ramos
- Lornna Soto
- Nayda Venegas

=== House of Representatives ===
==== At-large ====
- José Aponte
- José Chico
- Angel Cortés
- Italo Costa Corsi
- Rolando Crespo
- Jenniffer González
- Jaime Irizarry
- Julio Lebrón Lamboy
- Aixa Martinó
- Nicolás Muñoz
- Lourdes Ramos
- Iris Miriam Ruíz
- Soraya
- José "Pichy" Torres Zamora
- Félix Vega Fournier

==== District ====
The Popular Democratic Party held primaries on 30 of the 40 representative districts.

===== District 1 =====
- Gloria Escudero
- Mario González La Fuente
- José "Nuno" López

===== District 4 =====
- Liza Fernández
- Nelson A. Rivera

===== District 5 =====
- Luisito Fuentes
- Jorge Navarro Suárez

===== District 6 =====
- Javier Capestany Figueroa
- Angel Pérez Otero

===== District 8 =====
- Toñito Silva
- Mario Tevenal

===== District 9 =====
- Pito Marrero
- Angel "Gary" Rodríguez
- Rafy Rodríguez
- Juan "Papo" Soto

===== District 10 =====
- Bernardo Márquez
- Pedro Julio Santiago
- Víctor Soto, Jr.

===== District 11 =====
- Frank Acha
- Víctor "Pío" Concepción
- Miguel Angel Figueroa
- Jean P. Rubio
- María Vega Pagán

===== District 14 =====
- Charlie Ayala
- Wilson Pantoja
- Gustavo Rodríguez
- Paula Rodríguez Homs
- Yamill

===== District 15 =====
- Arnaldo Jiménez Valle
- Efraín Concepción
- Rey Escoriaza
- Nino Román

===== District 16 =====
- Elisa Juarbe Beníquez
- Iván Rodríguez
- Miguel Trabal

===== District 17 =====
- Rafael Lugo Hernández
- José L. Rivera Guerra
- Junior Robledo
- William

===== District 18 =====
- David Bonilla Cortés
- Angel Muñoz

===== District 20 =====
- Norman Ramírez Rivera
- Lucy Rivera

===== District 21 =====
- Noel Morales, Jr.
- Rey

===== District 22 =====
- Héctor Luis "Tito" Camacho
- Jorge Collazo
- Waldemar Quiles

===== District 23 =====
- Luis Edgardo Díaz
- Julissa Nolasco
- Gaddier Oliveras
- Hernán Santiago

===== District 24 =====
- John Giménez
- Luis "Tato" León

===== District 26 =====
- Emilio
- José Luis Jiménez
- Freddy Santiago

===== District 28 =====
- Carmen Gloria Hernández
- Rafael Rivera Ortega
- Jorge Santini

===== District 31 =====
- Edgar Acevedo
- Junior Aponte
- Roberto López
- Jorge L. Reyes

===== District 32 =====
- José R. Camino
- Shirley Ann Casillas
- Magal González

===== District 33 =====
- Willy Gómez
- Angel R. Peña, Jr.
- Amparo Rodríguez
- Raúl Rodríguez

===== District 34 =====
- Cristóbal Colón
- Pickie Díaz
- Lorenzo Valcárcel, Jr.

===== District 35 =====
- Julio César
- Noé Marcano

===== District 36 =====
- Johnny Méndez
- Augusto Sánchez

===== District 37 =====
- Angel Bulerín
- William Cantres Nieves
- Normis Quintero

===== District 38 =====
- Eric Correa
- Joel Cruz Hiraldo
- Wilfredo Pérez Torres
- Raymond Sánchez

===== District 39 =====
- Sergio Esteves
- Esther
- César Valentín

===== District 40 =====
- Elizabeth Casado
- Francisco, Jr.

=== Mayors ===
The New Progressive Party held primaries in 34 of 78 municipalities.

==== Aguada ====
- "Berty" Echevarría
- Manuel Santiago
- Lorenzo Vale, Jr.

==== Aguas Buenas ====
- Miguel
- Edwin Morales
- Vitín Ramos

==== Arecibo ====
- Carlos Molina
- Angel "Kuko" Ramos
- Lemuel Soto

==== Arroyo ====
- Darwin Covas
- Basilio Figueroa
- Ramón Morales

==== Caguas ====
- Orlando Rivera
- Carlos González

==== Camuy ====
- Edwin García Feliciano
- Johnny

==== Canóvanas ====
- Roberto Cruz
- Manuel Quiñones
- José "Chemo" Soto

==== Cataño ====
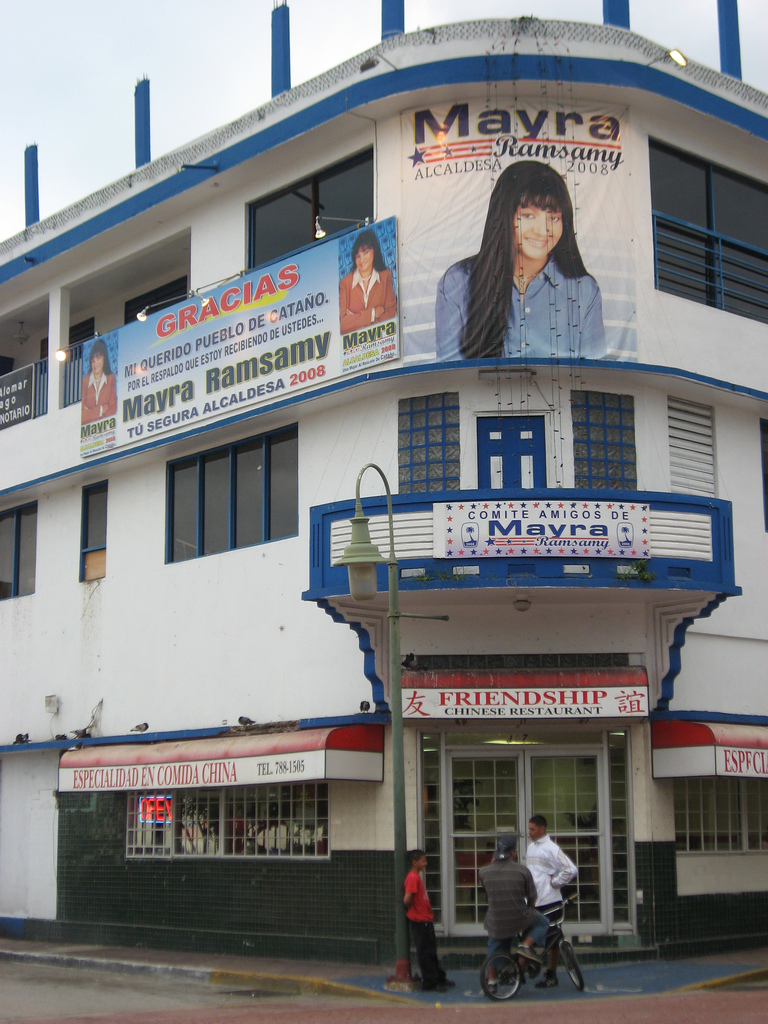
Mayra Ramsamy 2008 campaign posters on a Chinese restaurant in Cataño

- Julio Alicea
- Mayra Ramsamy
- Wilson Soto
- Yareco

==== Cayey ====
- Wilson Colón
- Benjamín González

==== Ceiba ====
- Pedro Colón Osorio
- Angelo Cruz Ramos

==== Corozal ====
- Roberto Hernández Vélez
- Norberto Torres

==== Florida ====
- Aaron Pargas Ojeda
- Víctor M. Rodríguez

==== Guaynabo ====
- Héctor O'Neill
- Miguel Gutarra

==== Humacao ====
- "Piloto" Santiago
- Maritza Vargas

==== Juana Díaz ====
- Gardy Guzmán
- Nilsa Santiago

==== Juncos ====
- Junito Mulero
- Karen Velázquez

==== Lajas ====
- Leo Cotte
- Edgardo
- Johnny Ramos

==== Lares ====
- Roberto Pagán Centeno
- Eddie Nuñez

==== Las Piedras ====
- Micky López
- Angel R. Peña

==== Loíza ====
- Luis Ambrosio de Jesús
- Eddie Manso

==== Luquillo ====
- José "Nelo" González
- Rafa Pérez

==== Morovis ====
- Norberto Negrón
- Heriberto Rodríguez

==== Patillas ====
- Benjamín Cintrón Lebrón
- Maritza Rivera

==== Ponce ====
- Angel Llavona
- María "Mayita" Meléndez

==== Quebradillas ====
- Moisés Soto
- Elías Nieves

==== Rincón ====
- María Lourdes Méndez
- Eddie Ríos

==== Río Grande ====
- César
- María Milagros Charbonier
- Javier Sánchez

==== Sabana Grande ====
- Wilfrido Bonilla
- Santitos Rivera
- Linnette Toledo

==== Salinas ====
- Ernesto Aponte
- Jorgito Díaz
- Carlos Rodríguez Mateo

==== San Germán ====
- Mónica Alpi
- Luis Cancel
- Efraín Montalvo
- Edgardo Suárez

==== San Sebastián ====
- Javier Jiménez
- Justo Medina

==== Toa Alta ====
- Luis Collazo Rivera
- Nelson
- Evelyn Ortega

==== Trujillo Alto ====
- Julio Andino
- Emmanuel Huertas
- Eduardo Otero

==== Utuado ====
- Alan González Cancel
- Jorgito Pérez

== Results ==
The primaries were held on March 9, 2008. In it, Fortuño comfortably defeated Rosselló to win the spot for Governor at the 2008 elections. Also, Pedro Pierluisi defeated Charlie Rodríguez and Miriam Ramírez de Ferrer with 60% of the votes to win the spot for Resident Commissioner.

=== Governor ===
Candidate	Popular vote	Percentage
Luis Fortuño	445,026	59.21%
Pedro Rosselló	306,590	40.79%
Others	49	0.01%

=== Resident Commissioner ===
Candidate	Popular vote	Percentage
Pedro Pierluisi	440,672	59.59%
Charlie Rodríguez	248,127	33.56%
Miriam Ramírez de Ferrer	50,590	6.84%
Others	64	0.01%

=== Senate ===
==== At-large ====
Candidate	Popular vote	Percentage
Norma Burgos	421,139	11.37%
Thomas Rivera Schatz	410,474	11.08%
Margarita Nolasco	307,723	8.31%
Jorge de Castro Font	278,733	7.53%
Lucy Arce	228,360	6.17%
Itzamar Peña Ramírez	219,524	5.93
Henry Neumann	208,535	5.63%
Oreste Ramos	203,051	5.48%
Abid Quiñones	179,890	4.86%
José Garriga Picó	169,485	4.58%
William Villafañe	162,918	4.40%
Reynaldo Paniagua	144,668	3.91%
Luis Batista Salas	102,479	2.77%
Tito Maldonado	93,097	2.51%
Roger Iglesias	85,859	2.32%
Wanda Aponte	85,115	2.30%
Cristóbal Berríos	77,053	2.08%
Roberto Carlos Mejill	69,036	1.86%
Luz M. "Tuty" Silva	64,171	1.73%
Orlando José Rivera Sepúlveda	59,311	1.60%
Manuel de Jesús	51,594	1.39%
Santos Ramos Lugo	50,373	1.36%
Luis Oscar Casillas González	29,253	0.79%
Others	1,382	0.04%

==== District ====
===== San Juan =====
Candidate	Popular vote	Percentage
Roberto Arango	42,191	29.17%
Kimmey Raschke	35,193	24.34%
Carlos Díaz	33,431	23.12%
Edward Moreno	26,044	18.01%
Omar Miranda Torres	7,632	5.28%
Others	126	0.09%

===== Bayamón =====
Candidate	Popular vote	Percentage
Migdalia Padilla	43,364	24.21%
Carmelo Ríos	39,518	22.07
Héctor "Cano" O'Neill	32,336	18.06%
Felix H. Delgado	23,120	12.91%
Pedro Orraca	16,299	9.10%
Edwin Rivera Rodríguez	13,068	7.30%
Noel Toro	11,273	6.29%
Others	118	0.07%

===== Arecibo =====
Candidate	Popular vote	Percentage
José E. González	33,788	20.63%
Angel Martínez	26,304	16.06
Johnny Maldonado	24,978	15.25%
Alexis Valle	23,866	14.57%
Anthony López	21,587	13.18%
Gabriel Félix Rivera	12,717	7.77%
Víctor "Buhito" Marrero	11,503	7.02%
Roger Owens	8,959	5.47%
Others	53	0.03%

===== Mayagüez-Aguadilla =====
Candidate	Popular vote	Percentage
Luis Daniel Muñiz	50,010	29.92%
Evelyn Vázquez	36,581	21.89%
Carlos Pagán	35,959	21.52%
Michael Nazario	22,569	13.50%
Jorge Rodríguez	21,954	13.14%
Others	56	0.03%

===== Ponce =====
Candidate	Popular vote	Percentage
Larry Seilhamer	33,717	24.71%
Luis Berdiel	25,497	18.69
Luinel Torres Acosta	23,754	17.41%
Juan Luis Colón	17,330	12.70%
Ramoncito Ramos	15,440	11.32%
María Alvarado	14,387	10.54%
Benny A. Morales	6,247	4.58%
Others	81	0.06%

===== Guayama =====
Candidate	Popular vote	Percentage
Antonio Soto Díaz	29,473	18.27%
Carlos J. Torres	23,863	14.79
Luisito Pagán	22,288	13.82%
Paco Fontánez	19,686	12.20%
Miguelito Martínez	19,318	11.97%
Osvaldo Ortolaza	18,057	11.19%
"Vi" Negrón	14,294	8.86%
Osvaldo Colón	9,335	5.79%
Robert Santiago	4,957	3.07%
Others	51	0.03%

===== Humacao =====
Candidate	Popular vote	Percentage
Luz M. Santiago	36,234	24.39%
José Ramón Díaz	36,211	24.37%
Rafi Uceta	33,872	22.80%
Juan B.	25,449	17.13%
Francisco Pereira	16,716	11.25%
Others	97	0.07%

===== Carolina =====
Candidate	Popular vote	Percentage
Héctor Martínez	41,216	28.51%
Lornna Soto	39,965	27.64
Haydee Calderón	16,312	11.28%
Pablo Ramos	15,964	11.04%
Nayda Venegas	15,956	11.04%
Rosemary O'Connell	15,145	10.47%
Others	25	0.02%

=== House of Representatives ===
==== At-large ====
Candidate	Popular vote	Percentage
Jenniffer González	404,852	11.24%
Iris Miriam Ruíz	370,123	10.27%
Lourdes Ramos	354,358	9.84%
José Aponte	343,915	9.55%
Rolando Crespo	280,263	7.78%
José Chico	275,371	7.64
Jaime Irizarry	254,626	7.07%
Nicolás Muñoz	246,449	6.84%
Félix Vega Fournier	206,695	5.74%
Soraya	194,496	5.40%
Angel Cortés	184,346	5.12%
José Torres Zamora	163,159	4.53%
Aixa Martinó	157,830	4.38%
Julio Lebrón Lamboy	124,520	3.46%
Italo Costa Corsi	41,308	1.15%
Others	233	0.01%

==== District ====
===== District 1 =====
Candidate	Popular vote	Percentage
José "Nuno" López	7,019	45.68%
Gloria Escudero	4,245	27.63%
Mario González	4,073	26.51%
Others	29	0.19%

===== District 4 =====
Candidate	Popular vote	Percentage
Liza Fernández	12,960	82.98%
Nelson A. Rivera	2,628	16.83%
Others	30	0.19%

===== District 5 =====
Candidate	Popular vote	Percentage
Jorge Navarro	13,136	67.59%
Luisito Fuentes	6,285	32.34%
Others	14	0.07%

===== District 6 =====
Candidate	Popular vote	Percentage
Angel Pérez	12,439	53.53%
Javier Capestany	10,788	46.42%
Others	12	0.05%

===== District 8 =====
Candidate	Popular vote	Percentage
Antonio Silva	11,523	60.03%
Mario Tevenal	7,670	39.95%
Others	4	0.02%

===== District 10 =====
Candidate	Popular vote	Percentage
Bernardo Márquez	10,488	51.50%
Pedro J. Santiago	8,979	44.09%
Víctor Soto, Jr.	891	4.38%
Others	7	0.03%

===== District 11 =====
Candidate	Popular vote	Percentage
María Vega	3,742	24.10%
Frank Acha	3,467	22.33%
Víctor Concepción	3,100	19.96%
Miguel Angel Figueroa	2,956	19.04%
Jean P. Rubio	2,259	14.55%
Others	4	0.03%

===== District 14 =====
Candidate	Popular vote	Percentage
Paula Rodríguez	6,548	34.74%
Yamill	4,689	24.87%
Gustavo Rodríguez	4,561	24.20%
Wilson Pantoja	2,097	11.12%
Charlie Ayala	956	5.07%
Others	0	0.00%

===== District 15 =====
Candidate	Popular vote	Percentage
Arnaldo Jiménez	6,245	30.24%
Efraín Concepción	5,612	27.17%
Nino Román	4,792	23.20%
Rey Escoriaza	3,998	19.36%
Others	6	0.03%

===== District 16 =====
Candidate	Popular vote	Percentage
Iván Rodríguez	9,820	43.13%
Miguel Trabal	8,063	35.41%
Elisa Juarbe	4,878	21.42%
Others	9	0.04%

===== District 17 =====
Candidate	Popular vote	Percentage
José L. Rivera	12,701	60.64%
Junior Robledo	3,791	18.10%
William	2,495	11.91%
Rafael Lugo	1,953	9.32%
Others	4	0.02%

===== District 18 =====
Candidate	Popular vote	Percentage
David Bonilla	12,923	53.18%
Angel Muñoz	11,345	46.69%
Others	32	0.13%

===== District 20 =====
Candidate	Popular vote	Percentage
Norman Ramírez	9,138	54.46%
Lucy Rivera	7,631	45.48%
Others	10	0.06%

===== District 21 =====
Candidate	Popular vote	Percentage
Noel Morales	8,880	58.68%
Rey	6,244	41.26%
Others	10	0.07%

===== District 23 =====
Candidate	Popular vote	Percentage
Julissa Nolasco	7,924	49.44%
Gaddier Oliveras	4,363	27.22%
Hernán Santiago	2,274	14.19%
Luis Edgardo Díaz	1,417	8.84%
Others	51	0.32%

===== District 24 =====
Candidate	Popular vote	Percentage
Luis "Tato" León	9,465	70.84%
John Giménez	3,891	29.12%
Others	5	0.04%

===== District 26 =====
Candidate	Popular vote	Percentage
José Luis Jiménez	9,290	48.14%
Freddy Santiago	9,109	47.21%
Emilio	897	4.65%
Others	0	0.00%

===== District 28 =====
Candidate	Popular vote	Percentage
Rafael Rivera	14,209	60.66%
Carmen Hernández	6,429	27.45%
Jorge Santini	2,781	11.87%
Others	6	0.03%

===== District 31 =====
Candidate	Popular vote	Percentage
Junior Aponte	7,498	44.91%
Roberto López	5,793	34.70%
Edgar Acevedo	2,045	12.25%
Jorge L. Reyes	1,347	8.07%
Others	13	0.08%

===== District 32 =====
Candidate	Popular vote	Percentage
José R. Camino	8,038	54.65%
Shirley Ann Casillas	3,707	25.20%
Magal González	2,954	20.08%
Others	9	0.06%

===== District 33 =====
Candidate	Popular vote	Percentage
Angel Peña, Jr.	10,707	53.36%
Raúl Rodríguez	3,773	18.80%
Willy Gómez	2,922	14.56%
Amparo Rodríguez	2,582	12.87%
Others	81	0.40%

===== District 34 =====
Candidate	Popular vote	Percentage
Cristóbal Colón	11,676	58.19%
Pickie Díaz	7,267	36.22%
Lorenzo Valcárcel, Jr.	1,120	5.58%
Others	3	0.01%

===== District 35 =====
Candidate	Popular vote	Percentage
Julio César	8,367	51.95%
Noé Marcano	7,724	47.96%
Others	14	0.09%

===== District 36 =====
Candidate	Popular vote	Percentage
Johnny Méndez	10,666	70.68%
Augusto Sánchez	4,411	29.23%
Others	13	0.09%

===== District 37 =====
Candidate	Popular vote	Percentage
Angel Bulerín	9,197	50.51%
Normis Quintero	7,591	41.69%
William Cantres	1,421	7.80%
Others	1	0.01%

===== District 38 =====
Candidate	Popular vote	Percentage
Eric Correa	5,688	36.64%
Joel Cruz Hiraldo	4,622	29.78%
Raymond Sánchez	4,239	27.31%
Wilfredo Pérez	960	6.18%
Others	13	0.08%

===== District 39 =====
Candidate	Popular vote	Percentage
Sergio Esteves	5,821	40.47%
Esther	4,491	31.22%
César Valentín	4,056	28.20%
Others	15	0.10%

===== District 40 =====
Candidate	Popular vote	Percentage
Elizabeth Casado	10,931	73.14%
Francisco, Jr.	4,001	26.77%
Others	14	0.09%

== Aftermath ==
=== Members of PPD voting ===
During and after the primaries, members of the New Progressive Party (PNP), like Senator Norma Burgos, claimed they saw voters affiliated with the opposing Popular Democratic Party (PPD) voting in the PNP ballots. Also, Maritza Vázquez, Electoral Commissioner of PPD representative Conny Varela, admitted in 2010 that "thousands of 'populares' voted on that election'". Some of the supporters of Rosselló maintain that this "crossover" was crucial in Pedro Rosselló's defeat against Luis Fortuño.

=== Rosselló "Write-In" campaign ===
As a result of Rosselló's loss in the primaries, a group of his supporters started a campaign to have him elected through "Write-in" voting.

=== The fate of the "Auténticos" ===
Despite Rosselló's call for a "vote of punishment" against the "Auténticos", all but one of the eligible candidates from that faction were elected in the primaries. Carlos Díaz was edged out of the election race by Senators Roberto Arango and Kimmey Raschke. Migdalia Padilla, Lucy Arce, and Jorge de Castro Font were all elected. Kenneth McClintock had decided not to run for Senate, while Orlando Parga refused to return to the party after his expulsion, and started an independent campaign.

== See also ==
- Popular Democratic Party primaries, 2008
