= Senator Díaz =

Senator Díaz may refer to:

== Mexico (Senate of the Republic) ==
- Blanca Judith Díaz Delgado (born 1958)
- Jaime Rafael Díaz Ochoa (born 1956)
- Jorge Díaz Serrano (1921–2011)
- Socorro Díaz Palacios (born 1949)

== United States ==
- Antonio Soto Díaz (1949–2016), Senate of Puerto Rico
- Carlos Díaz Sánchez (born 1970), Senate of Puerto Rico
- Eva Diaz (Arizona politician), Arizona State Senate
- José J. Benítez Díaz (1866–1947), Senate of Puerto Rico
- José Ramón Díaz (born 1973), Senate of Puerto Rico
- Manny Díaz Jr. (born 1973), Florida State Senate
- Rubén Díaz Sr. (born 1943), New York State Senate

== See also ==
- Lincoln Díaz-Balart (born 1954), Florida State Senate
- Mario Díaz-Balart (born 1961), Florida State Senate
- Senator Díaz de la Portilla (disambiguation)
