= Senator Iglesias =

Senator Iglesias may refer to:

- Roger Iglesias (born 1958), Senate of Puerto Rico
- Santiago Iglesias (1872–1939), Senate of Puerto Rico
