= Jorge Pérez Heredia =

Puerto Rican politician

Mayor of Utuado
- Incumbent
- Assumed office January 16, 2021
- Preceded by: Ernesto Irizarry Salvá

Personal details
- Born: 1966 (age 59–60) Utuado, Puerto Rico
- Party: New Progressive (NPP)
- Spouse(s): Sheila Figueroa Cuevas (formerly); Keisha González Colón
- Children: 4

Jorge "Jorgito" Pérez Heredia is a Puerto Rican politician and current mayor of the municipality of Utuado, Puerto Rico. He is affiliated with the New Progressive Party (NPP) and is a former supervisor of the Puerto Rico Electric Power Authority (PREPA).

== Political career ==
Pérez Heredia was a candidate for the New Progressive Party's nomination for District 22 Representative in their 2003 primaries. He was also a candidate for the party's nomination for mayor of Utuado against incumbent Alan González Cancel in their 2008 primaries, that Pérez Heredia lost by a wide margin.

After González Cancel stepped down from a fourth consecutive term, Jorge Pérez Heredia won the NPP's nomination for mayor of Utuado in their 2012 primaries. He ran against Ernesto Irizarry Salvá (PDP) in the general elections that same year, which resulted in the latter as the winner, marking the first time the New Progressive Party had lost a mayoral election in Utuado in 25 years. Pérez Heredia ran once again in the 2020 general elections against the two-term incumbent Irizarry Salvá for the office of mayor of Utuado, ultimately winning the ballot with 49.2% of the votes. He is the first mayor in the history of Utuado to win without a 50% of the total votes. He was sworn in as mayor of Utuado on January 16, 2021.

Pérez Heredia was re-elected for a second term as mayor of Utuado in the 2024 Puerto Rico gubernatorial election.
