= Senator Ramos =

Senator Ramos may refer to:

- Bruno Ramos (born 1950), Senate of Puerto Rico
- Jessica Ramos (fl. 2010s–2020s), New York State Senate
- Oreste Ramos (fl. 1970s–2000s), Senate of Puerto Rico
