= Luz M. Santiago González =

Puerto Rico politician (born 1957)

Member of the Puerto Rico Senate from the Humacao district
- In office January 2, 2009 – January 2, 2013

Member of the Municipal Assembly of Yabucoa, Puerto Rico
- In office 2000-2008

Personal details
- Born: November 8, 1957 (age 68) Yabucoa, Puerto Rico
- Party: New Progressive Party
- Children: Wai Lok; Pusie; Pukei
- Education: University of Puerto Rico (BS) University of Turabo
- Profession: Politician

Luz M. Santiago González (born November 8, 1957, in Yabucoa, Puerto Rico) is a Puerto Rican politician and Senator. Santiago has been a member of the Senate of Puerto Rico since 2008.

== Early years and studies ==
Luz M. Santiago González was born on November 8, 1957, in Yabucoa, Puerto Rico. His parents are Angel M. Santiago and María E. González. Santiago studied in the public system of Puerto Rico, until her first year of high school. At that time, she continued studying at the University Preparatory Center (CROEM) in Mayagüez. She received his bachelor's degree in natural science from the University of Puerto Rico and then continued studies in education at the University of Turabo. She worked fourteen years for the Puerto Rico Department of Health.

== Political career ==
In 2000, Santiago began her political career when she was elected as a municipal legislator for Yabucoa at the 2000 general elections. She then became the Speaker of her party in that body, until 2008.

In 2008, Santiago ran for senator for the District of Humacao and won his party primaries. At the 2008 general election, Santiago won along with José Ramón Díaz. She currently presides the Commission of Natural and Environmental Resources. She was not reelected in the 2012 elections.

== Personal life ==
Santiago González has three children: Wai Lok, Pusie, and Pukei.
