= Velda González =

Member of the Senate of Puerto Rico

Member of the Puerto Rico Senate from the at-large district
- In office 1981–2005

President pro tempore of the Senate of Puerto Rico
- In office 2001–2004
- Preceded by: Lucy Arce
- Succeeded by: Orlando Parga

Personal details
- Born: April 10, 1933 Hatillo, Puerto Rico
- Died: April 20, 2016 (aged 83) San Juan, Puerto Rico
- Party: Popular Democratic Party
- Other political affiliations: Popular Democratic Party (PPD)
- Spouse: Héctor L. Modestti (deceased)
- Children: Freddy; Mirelsa; Velda
- Education: University of Puerto Rico (BA, MA)
- Profession: Politician; actress

Velda González de Modestti (April 10, 1933 – April 20, 2016) was a Puerto Rican actress, dancer, comedian, politician and former senator. She was a member of the Senate of Puerto Rico from 1981 to 2005.

== Early years and studies ==
Velda González was born on April 10, 1933, in Hatillo, Puerto Rico. She studied at her elementary school in her hometown, and continued high school in Carolina and San Juan, graduating from University High School. González enrolled at the University of Puerto Rico where she received a Bachelor's degree in Arts, with a Major in Spanish and Theater. She also completed studies for a Master's degree in Puerto Rican Studies from the Center of Advanced Studies of Puerto Rico and the Caribbean.

== Artistic career ==
González began her artistic career as part of the University of Puerto Rico ballet directed by Madame Herta Brauer. She also distinguished herself as both an instructor and actress in theater, television, radio, and films. She started to gain fame as part of the cast of El colegio de la alegría, with Tommy Muñíz. However, her most famous role was as Azucena, the maid in the comedy sketch La criada malcriada, back in 1965. The role was so popular that González continued doing the show for 15 years. Her namesake of "criada" (maid in Spanish) even gave a name to a local tomato sauce called Criada.

González also served as producer of a variety show called De fiesta con Velda at the end of the 1960s. She also performed in several films like El último gángster, Una mujer para los sábados, Fray Dólar, Prohibido amar en Nueva York, Romance en Puerto Rico, and others. During her career, she won several local awards, most notably the Agüeybanás de Oro for Distinguished Comedy Actress of the Decade (1965–1975), and Comedy Actress of the Year for three consecutive years (1969 to 1971). She was also recognized by the New York Latin ACE Awards as Best Comedy Actress in 1971 and 1978.

Her last performance was in "Las Chicas Del Calendario" two months before she died in April 2016.

== Political career: 1980–2005 ==
María Luisa Arcelay was a member of the Partido Coalicionista de Puerto Rico (The Puerto Rican Coalition Party). In the November 1932 elections, she was elected to represent the district of Mayagüez in the House of Representatives of Puerto Rico. This made Arcelay thereby the first Puerto Rican woman, and the first woman in all of Latin America, to be elected to a government legislative body, then in 1936 Maria M. de Pérez Almitory of the Liberal Party of Puerto Rico was elected the first ever female Senator in Puerto Rico. In 1952 Juana Rodríguez Mundo of the Popular Democratic Party (PPD) was elected at-large Senator and Antonia Cabrera de Fajardo of the Statehood Party was elected at-large by addition Senator. In 1956, Palmira Cabrera de Ibarra also of the Popular Democratic Party (PPD) was elected in the Arecibo District. In 1964 Josefina O. de Batle of the PPD was elected Senator. In 1968, Angeles Mendoza of the New Progressive Party (PNP) and Maria Arroyo de Colón of the Popular Democratic Party (PPD) were elected at-large Senators. In 1972, actress and singer Ruth Fernández was elected Popular Democratic Party (PPD) at-large Senator and also Sila Nazario de Ferrer (PNP - San Juan District). Fernandez served until 1980 when González replaced her in the Senate of Puerto Rico, making her the eleventh female to be elected in the history of that legislative body. c. González spent 25 years as a member of the Senate, being reelected in 1984, 1988, 1992, 1996, and 2000.

During her time as Senator, she focused on an agenda in favor of women rights. She presided the Commissions on Women Affairs, and Internal Affairs, among others. She was also the President pro tempore of the Senate from 2000 to 2004, under his colleague Antonio Fas Alzamora. She became controversial with her right-wing social-religious views. She censored reggaeton and "perreo", also sponsored legislation for compulsory child support payments (ASUME), which in view of many favored women over men.

In 2004, González lost an election for the first time in her career. She was placed 13th among at-large senatorial candidates slightly ahead of her mentor Fas Alzamora but below the 11th spot needed to be elected.

== Later years: 2004–2016 ==
After her political defeat, González went on to work for the Film Corporation of the Government of Puerto Rico. However, she returned to politics in 2008 when she was elected to the Municipal Assembly of Carolina.

== Personal life ==
González was married to Héctor L. Modestti, who died in 1980. She had three children: Freddie, Mirelsa-a well known television writer and psychologist, and Velda (died in 2022) who was a publicity professional.

== Death ==
González died from natural causes on April 20, 2016, at the age of 83 in San Juan, Puerto Rico. She was buried at Buxeda Cemetery in Carolina, Puerto Rico.

== See also ==
- List of Puerto Ricans
- Senate of Puerto Rico
- History of women in Puerto Rico

Senate of Puerto Rico
Preceded by Antonio Fas Alzamora	Minority Whip of the Puerto Rico Senate; 1997–2000	Succeeded by Orlando Parga
Preceded by Lucy Arce	President pro tempore of the Puerto Rico Senate; 2001–2015	Succeeded by Orlando Parga
