= Carmen Maldonado González =

Puerto Rican politician

Carmen Maldonado
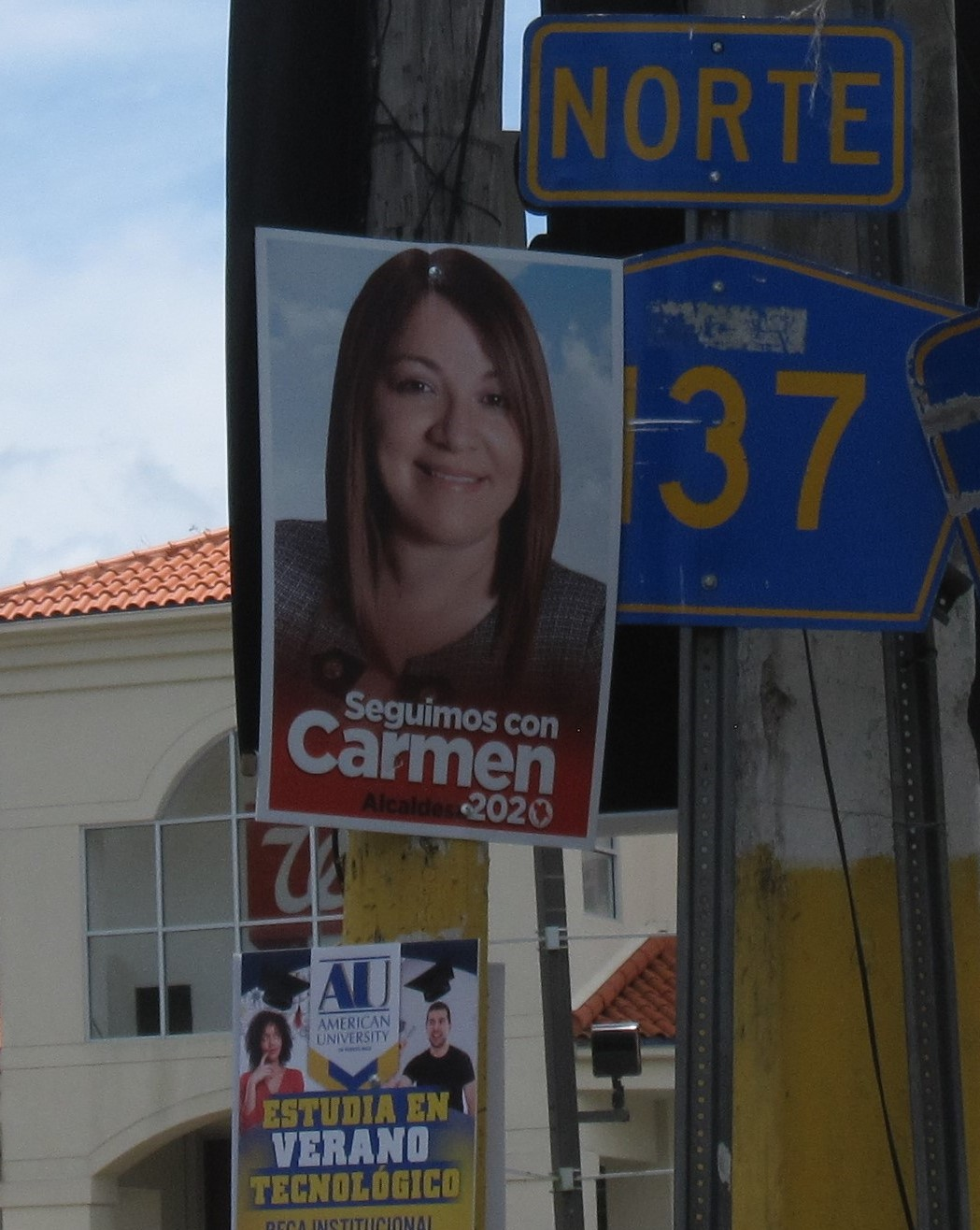

Mayor of Morovis
- Incumbent
- Assumed office January 14, 2017
- Preceded by: Heriberto Rodríguez

Personal details
- Born: Morovis, Puerto Rico
- Party: Popular Democratic
- Education: Ana G. Méndez University, Carolina (BBA); University of the Sacred Heart (MA); University of León (PhD); Pontifical Catholic University of Puerto Rico, Ponce (JD)

Carmen Irene Maldonado González is a Puerto Rican politician and mayor of Morovis, Puerto Rico. Maldonado is affiliated with the Popular Democratic Party (in Spanish: Partido Popular Democrático (PPD)), has been serving as mayor since 2017 and was reelected again in 2020. As of 2019, she is the vice-president of her party.

== Initiatives and career ==
In early 2019, Maldonado pushed an initiative to promote the agriculture of Morovis, along with forty farmers from Morovis, so that the products may be marked and marketed as "Made in Morovis".

Maldonado voted against governor Ricardo Rosselló's proposal to change Municipalities of Puerto Rico, (administrative divisions) to "counties" of Puerto Rico, as they are called in the United States. Puerto Rico was established by Spain and until now has the administrative divisions that closely resemble the Spanish ways. Maldonado argued that there is no equivalent in the United States to Puerto Rico's next level of administrative division, barrios of Puerto Rico.

As of 2019, Maldonado is the vice-president of the Popular Democratic Party and she is running for reelection for the office of mayor of Morovis, in 2020.

== Tenure ==
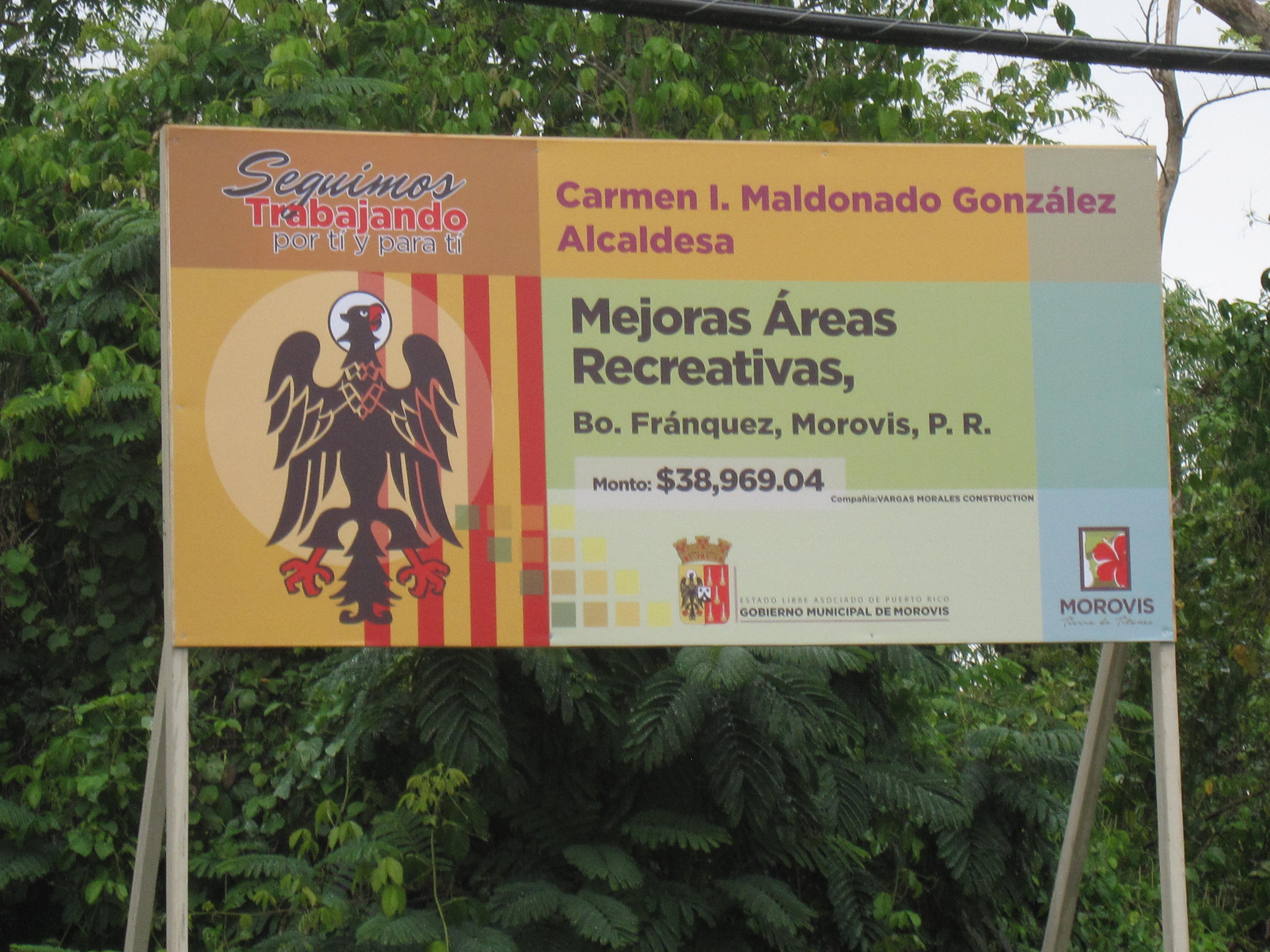
Sign in Fránquez barrio with works completed under Maldonado's watch

In December 2019, Maldonado stated she would run again for mayor of Morovis and talked of having inherited a multi-million budget deficit upon first taking office and celebrated a budget surplus in 2019. She also stated that under her jurisdiction Morovis now offered free public transport from various barrios to the downtown area of Morovis.

=== Hurricane Maria ===
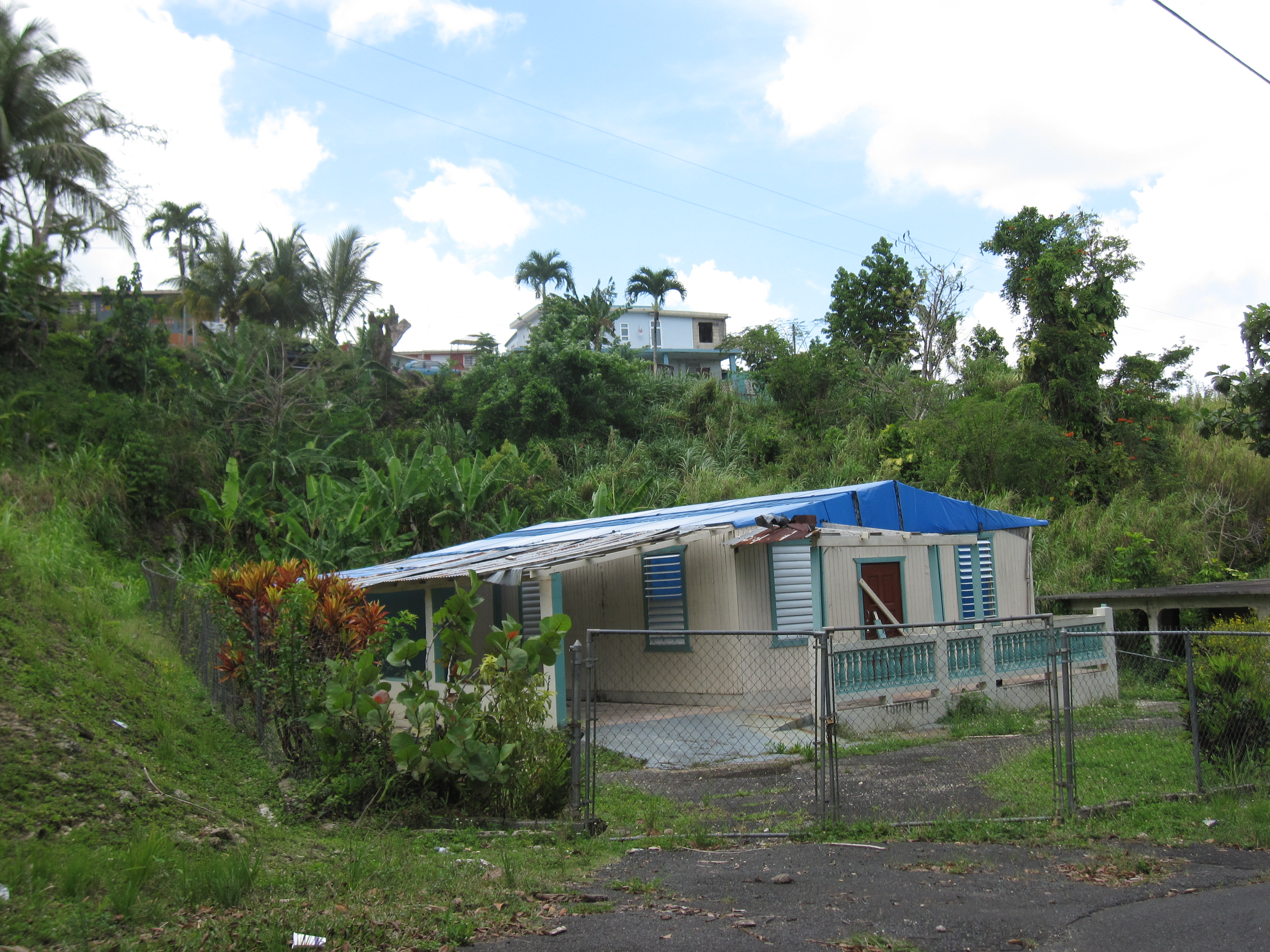
Home in Morovis, Puerto Rico with blue tarp May, 2019

Hurricane Maria struck the island of Puerto Rico on September 20, 2017, and the electrical power of Morovis was completely destroyed, leaving many residents in the dark for more than four months, some for eight months, and some for even longer. Stories of how people in the barrios were surviving without electrical power, and some without access to clean water were featured on the local and U.S. national news regularly. The community in San Lorenzo, a barrio of Morovis with about 1000 people, was isolated when the bridge into the barrio was washed away by the Morovis River. Maldonado delivered food to residents, the municipal town hall became a food distribution center and she arranged for the purchase and delivery of a water truck to provide clean water to the residents who did not have access to clean water.

Maldonado spoke to New York governor Andrew Cuomo, requesting his help and Cuomo responded by contacting H.e.a.r.t. 9/11, a non-profit organization. In early 2019, Maldonado received and thanked volunteers from H.e.a.r.t. 9/11, mostly carpenters who came to Morovis to repair and rebuild homes damaged by the hurricane. In late 2019, H.e.a.r.t. 9/11 was still rebuilding roofs in Morovis, Puerto Rico.
