= Víctor Santiago Díaz =

Puerto Rican politician

Mayor of Toa Baja
- In office January 2, 2001 – January 1, 2005
- Preceded by: Víctor M. Soto
- Succeeded by: Aníbal Vega Borges

Personal details
- Born: August 28, 1968
- Died: December 30, 2015 (aged 47)
- Party: Popular Democratic Party (PPD)
- Occupation: Politician, teacher

Víctor Santiago Díaz was a Puerto Rican politician and former mayor of Toa Baja. He was a member of the Popular Democratic Party (PPD).

Santiago Díaz was elected as mayor of Toa Baja at the 2000 general election, defeating the incumbent mayor, Víctor M. Soto. However, in the 2004 general elections, Santiago was defeated by PNP candidate Aníbal Vega Borges.

Santiago Díaz died on December 30, 2015, from cancer. Aside of his public service as mayor, he worked as a school teacher.
