= José Aponte Dalmau =

Puerto Rican politician

José Carlos Aponte Dalmau
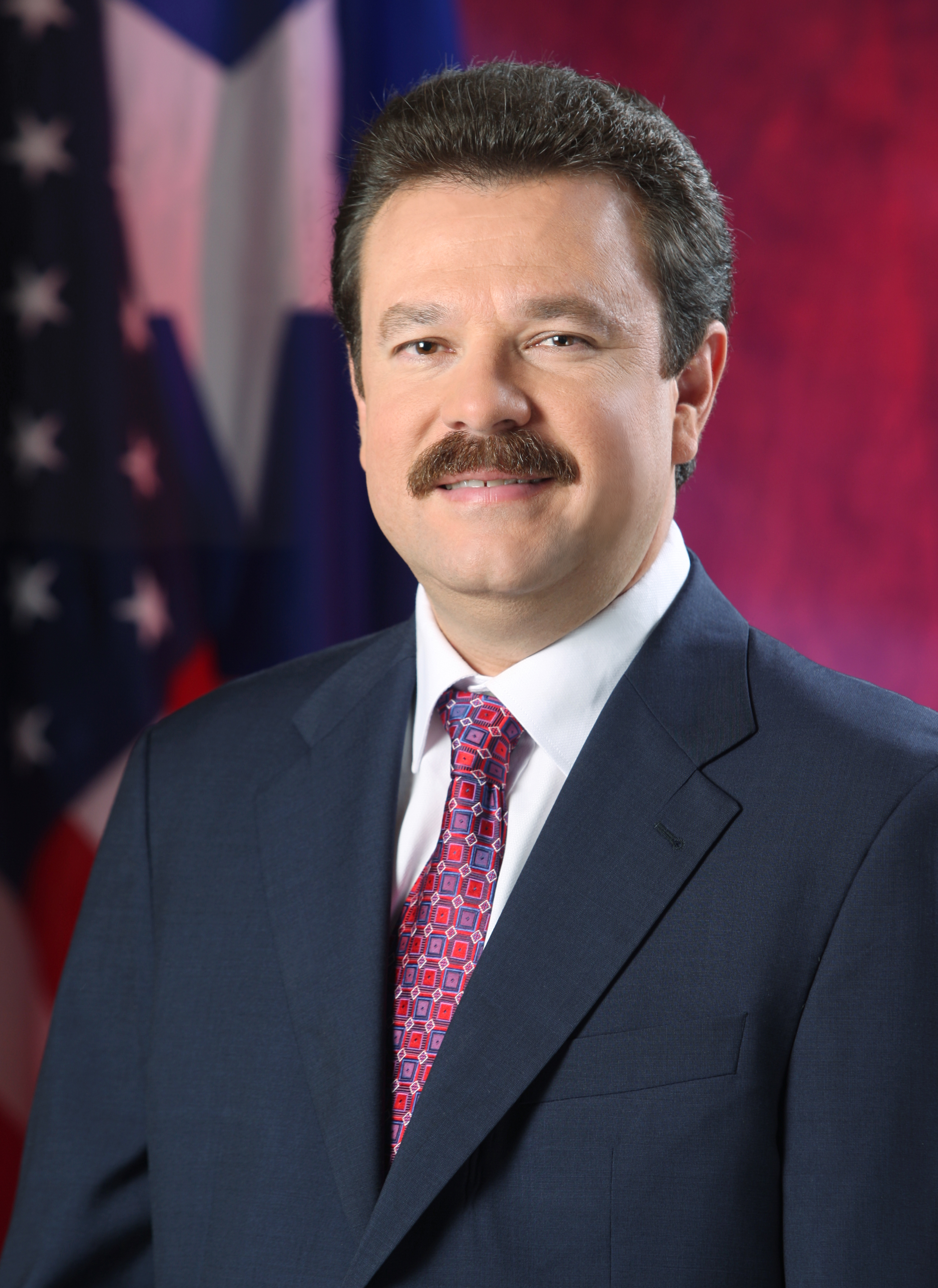

Mayor of Carolina
- Incumbent
- Assumed office May 10, 2007
- Preceded by: José Aponte de la Torre

Personal details
- Born: March 2, 1965 (age 61) San Juan, Puerto Rico
- Party: Popular Democratic Party (PPD)
- Spouse: Mabel López Santiago
- Children: Gabriel Alejandro
- Education: Polytechnic University of Puerto Rico (BE)
- Occupation: Politician

José Carlos Aponte Dalmau (born March 2, 1965) is a Puerto Rican politician and current mayor of Carolina, Puerto Rico.

Aponte is the son of longtime mayor of Carolina, José Aponte de la Torre and Carmen Idalia "Daly" Dalmau. He completed his fourth year of high school at Luz América Calderon in Carolina, and subsequently studied secondary education in Civil Engineering at the Polytechnic University of Puerto Rico where he completed a Bachelor degree. When his father died on May 5, 2007, José Carlos announced his availability to continue his father's work. He was sworn on May 10, 2007. He was officially elected at the 2008 general elections. As mayor, he was appointed to the EPA's Local Government Advisory Committee (LGAC) and Small Community Advisory Subcommittee.
