= Edgardo Arlequín Vélez =

Puerto Rican politician

Mayor of Guayanilla
- In office January 14, 2001 – January 12, 2016
- Preceded by: Ceferino Pacheco
- Succeeded by: Nelson Torres Yordán

Member of the Municipal Assembly of Guayanilla, Puerto Rico
- In office 1996–2000

Personal details
- Born: November 15, 1952 Guayanilla, Puerto Rico
- Died: April 13, 2025 (aged 72) Guayanilla, Puerto Rico
- Party: Popular Democratic Party (PPD)
- Education: Interamerican University of Puerto Rico at San Germán (BA)

Edgardo Arlequín Vélez November 15, 1952 - April 13, 2025 was a Puerto Rican politician and former mayor of Guayanilla. Arlequín is affiliated with the Popular Democratic Party (PPD) and was first elected as mayor in 2001.

At the end of his term in 2015 he was accused of sexual misconduct, which forced him to resign on January 12, 2016. He was later pardoned by the former governor of Puerto Rico, Hon. Alejandro García Padilla.

== Political career ==
After serving 4 years at the municipal assembly, Arlequín Vega was elected as Mayor of Guayanilla in the 2000 Puerto Rican general elections. To win the seat, Arlequín defeated the incumbent Ceferino Pacheco Giudicelli, from the New Progressive Party. The margin of the win was 236 votes (1.8%) in favor of Arlequín. Like most mayors, he was sworn in during January 2001.

At the 2004 Puerto Rican general elections, Arlequín retained the seat winning by a wider margin this time (57.7% of the votes). His main rival was again Pacheco Giudicelli, who received only 39.3% of the votes.

Arlequín Vélez was reelected two more times in 2008 and 2012.

== Legal troubles ==
On November 18, 2014, the Puerto Rico Department of Justice referred a sexual misconduct case against Arlequín Vélez to the Puerto Rico Office of the Special Independent Prosecutor's Panel (PFEI). The accusations came from an employee of the municipality. In March 2015, the Popular Democratic Party (PPD) suspended Arlequín from all his charges within the party. The next month, a judge found cause for arrest against Arlequín for the charges.

On December 17, 2015, Arlequín Vélez was sentenced to four years in prison. Soon after, and not happy with the verdict Edgardo Arlequín presented an appeal to his sentence to the Appeals Court of Puerto Rico. After this, the Party started conversations with him to voluntarily resign to his seat, but Arlequín initially refused. On January 12, 2016, he finally presented his resignation.

On January 16 the Appeals Court granted him bail until his request to revoke the guilty verdict was clarified.

On December 30, 2016, the Governor of Puerto Rico, Alejandro García Padilla pardoned Edgardo Arlequín Vélez, who was convicted in 2015 for a sexual misconduct and for violating article 4.2 of The Puerto Rico Office of Government Ethics.

On December 4, 2017, Edgardo Arlequín's four-year sentence was revoked after the courts appeal system found him innocent of the same charges that led to his suspension as Mayor of Guayanilla in 2015 and eventually wrongfully convicted in the same year.

== Personal life ==
He earned a (BA) with concentration in music from the Interamerican University of Puerto Rico at San Germán. He was director of the Guayanilla Municipal Band.

== Death ==
Edgardo Arlequin Velez died on April 13, 2025, at the age of 72. He was buried at Cementerio Los Pinos in Guayanilla, Puerto Rico.
