= Roberto Iglesias Pérez =

Puerto Rican politician

Mayor of Carolina, Puerto Rico
- In office 1976–1984
- Preceded by: Manuel Fernández Corujo
- Succeeded by: José Aponte de la Torre

Personal details
- Born: July 23, 1930 Carolina, Puerto Rico
- Died: August 1, 2006 (aged 76) Carolina, Puerto Rico
- Party: New Progressive Party (PNP)
- Spouse: Rosaura Rodríguez
- Children: Roger
- Profession: Politician

Military service
- Allegiance: United States of America
- Branch/service: United States Army
- Rank: Private first class
- Battles/wars: Korean War

Roberto Iglesias Pérez (July 23, 1930 – August 1, 2006) was a Puerto Rican politician and former mayor of Carolina from 1976 to 1984.

Iglesias served in the United States Army during the Korean War. Was elected as Mayor of Carolina at the 1976 general elections. He served in that position until 1984, when he was succeeded by José Aponte de la Torre.

In 1991, Iglesias was accused of four charges of illegal appropriation of public funds from the city of Carolina. After a long trial, Iglesias declared himself guilty in 1995 and served one year on parole. As part of the sentence, he was forced to pay back $29,000 to the city.

Iglesias' son, Roger, is also a politician who is currently serving as a member of the Senate of Puerto Rico.

Died on August 1, 2006, in Carolina, Puerto Rico at age 76. Was buried at the Puerto Rico National Cemetery in Bayamón, Puerto Rico.
