= Roger Iglesias =

Puerto Rican politician

Roger Iglesias Suárez

Member of the Puerto Rico Senate from the Carolina district
- In office June 25, 2011 – January 1, 2013
- Preceded by: Héctor Martínez
- In office January 2, 1993 – January 2, 2000

Personal details
- Born: September 12, 1958 (age 67) Canóvanas, Puerto Rico
- Party: New Progressive Party
- Spouse: Ivette Sepúlveda
- Children: Karla; Kiara; Roger José
- Education: University of Puerto Rico at Mayagüez (B.Eng.)
- Profession: Politician; electrical engineer

Roger J. Iglesias Suárez (born September 12, 1958, in Canóvanas, Puerto Rico) is a Puerto Rican politician. He was a member of the Senate of Puerto Rico from 1992 to 2000 and 2011 to 2013. In 2011, he was elected to fill the vacant seat left by the resignation of Héctor Martínez.

== Early years and studies ==
Roger Iglesias was born on September 12, 1958, in the town of Canóvanas, Puerto Rico. His parents were Roberto Iglesias, former mayor of Carolina, and Rosaura Rodríguez. Iglesias obtained his bachelor's degree in electrical engineering from the University of Puerto Rico at Mayagüez.

== Political career ==
=== First years in politics: 1984–1991 ===
From 1984 to 1988, Iglesias served as Special Aide to then-Mayor of San Juan Baltasar Corrada del Río. In 1988, he served as Deputy Director of the District of Carolina.

=== Senator: 1992–2000 ===
Iglesias was elected to the Senate of Puerto Rico for the District of Carolina in the 1992 general elections. He was reelected in 1996. During this time, he presided over the Commissions of Treasury and Nominations.

=== Return to private life: 2000–2011 ===
In the 2000, Iglesias lost his seat in the Senate and he returned to his private practice as engineer. However, in 2005, he served as a Legislative Aide for the Senate.

In 2008, he ran for Senator at-large at the PNP primaries, but lost. However, he served as a legislative advisor to Kimmey Raschke and Migdalia Padilla.

=== Return to Senate: 2011–present ===
In April 2011, Carolina Senator Héctor Martínez resigned to his position leaving a vacant open for the New Progressive Party. Iglesias participated in an internal primary on June 18, 2011 and won. He was sworn in June 25, 2011 and served until January 1, 2013.

== Personal life ==
Iglesias is married to Ivette Sepúlveda. They have three children: Karla, Kiara, and Roger José.
