= Nelson Torres Yordán =

Puerto Rican politician

Mayor of Guayanilla
- In office 30 January 2016 – 11 January 2021
- Preceded by: Edgardo Arlequín Vélez
- Succeeded by: Raúl Rivera Rodríguez

Member of the Puerto Rico House of Representatives from the 23rd District
- In office 2 January 2013 – 25 January 2016
- Preceded by: Julissa Nolasco
- Succeeded by: Luis Elí Torres Monsegur

Personal details
- Born: 7 October 1981 (age 45) Ponce, Puerto Rico
- Party: Popular Democratic Party (PPD)
- Spouse: Lizandra Avilés Mendoza
- Education: Pontifical Catholic University of Puerto Rico School of Law (JD)
- Profession: Attorney

Nelson Torres Yordán (born 7 October 1981) is a Puerto Rican politician affiliated with the Popular Democratic Party (PPD). He was the speaker in the city legislature of Guayanilla, Puerto Rico, and he was later elected to the Puerto Rico House of Representatives in 2012 to represent District 23. He resigned to his seat in January 2016 to be sworn in as mayor of Guayanilla.

Torres Yordán earned a Juris Doctor from the Pontifical Catholic University of Puerto Rico in Ponce, Puerto Rico.

Torres Yordán was mayor of Guayanilla on 7 January 2020 when a 6.4 magnitude earthquake destroyed the parish church and other structures in Guayanilla Pueblo. One day previously, a 5.7 magnitude earthquake had destroyed various structures and cars.

House of Representatives of Puerto Rico
Preceded by Julissa Nolasco	Member of the Puerto Rico House of Representatives from the 23rd District; 2013-2016	Succeeded by Luis Elí Torres Monsegur
Political offices
Preceded by Edgardo Arlequín Vélez	Mayor of Guayanilla, Puerto Rico; 2016-2021	Succeeded by Raúl Rivera Rodríguez
