= List of mayors of Carolina, Puerto Rico =

The following is a list of mayors of the municipality of Carolina, Puerto Rico.

== List of mayors ==
=== 19th century ===
- Jose Ramirez, circa 1826
- Lorenzo de Vizcarrondo, Ortiz de Zárate, circa 1857
- Nicasio Viña, circa 1859
- José R. Medina, circa 1860
- Juan Cordero, circa 1861
- Pablo Mediavilla, circa 1862-1863
- Isidro García, circa 1864-1865
- Manuel Paniagua, circa 1866-1867
- Juan M. de Sárraga, circa 1867-1869
- Emiliano Díaz, circa 1869
- José Manuel Aguayo, circa 1871
- Juan José Machicote, circa 1871-1872
- Nicanor Zeno, circa 1872
- Francisco Acosta, circa 1872-1873
- Francisco de Paula Pérez, circa 1873
- Juan José Machicote, circa 1874
- Eugenio Malpica, circa 1876
- Lorenzo J. de Vizcarrondo, José Suárez, Ramón H. Delgado, circa 1877
- Francisco Acosta, circa 1879
- Ramiro Matute, circa 1881
- José Mercado, circa 1883-1884
- José Roig Colomer, Manuel Gil Sánchez, circa 1884
- Delfín Sierra, circa 1885
- Isidoro Uriarte, circa 1885-1887
- Antonio Acha, circa 1887-1890
- Joaquín de Fonseca, Francisco Molina Nebot, circa 1890
- Francisco Gómez, circa 1893
- Francisco Molina, circa 1895
- Francisco Jiménez Sicardó, circa 1896-1898
- Justo Casablanca, circa 1898
- Ramón H. Delgado, circa 1898-1899
- Eugenio Malpica, circa 1899-1900

=== 20th-21st centuries ===
- Ramón H. Delgado, circa 1900-1905
- Narciso Font Guillot, circa 1905-1918
- Epifanio Vizcarrondo, circa 1918
- Gregorio Hernández, circa 1919-1921
- Juan Osorio, circa 1921
- Aurelio Millán, circa 1925
- Félix Rivera, circa 1929
- Jesús M. Fragoso, circa 1933
- Domingo Cáceres, circa 1937
- Juan Osorio, circa 1941
- José Allende, circa 1943
- Federico Cordero, circa 1945
- Jesús Suárez, circa 1956
- Antonio Jiménez Landrau, circa 1961
- Heriberto Nieves, 1968-1972
- Manuel Fernández Corujo, circa 1973
- Roberto Iglesias Pérez, 1976-1984
- José Aponte de la Torre, 1984-2007
- José Aponte Dalmau, 2007–present
