= Jorge Raschke =

Puerto Rican evangelist Assemblies of God

Jorge Raschke García (born 12 December 1943 from New York City) is a Pentecostal, Assemblies of God evangelist who is well known for his political opinions as well as for his religious evangelistic events. He is of German (Ashkenazi) and Afro-Caribbean Spanish (Sephardic) descent.

== Día de Clamor a Dios ==
Raschke has travelled all over Latin America and the United States preaching, and has held conferences and church services in Venezuela, Colombia, Ecuador, Panama, Mexico, the Dominican Republic and other countries. Raschke has been holding a yearly event, Dia de Clamor a Dios (transl. The Day to Plead to God), for forty-four years. The event is held in September, on Labor Day, at the north entrance of Puerto Rico's Capitol building, and draws thousands of Christians from around Puerto Rico.

Raschke's daughter, Kimmey, was a member of the Senate of Puerto Rico. Raschke has another daughter, Kathryn, and a son, Jorge Isaac. Raschke owns WJVP 89.3 FM, a radio station in Culebra, Puerto Rico, which is operated by Clamor Broadcasting Network, Inc. and United WM Media.

== Views ==
Because of his religious credentials, he is often quoted in newspapers. He is outspoken and attends protests (with his followers) to express indignation or support for a cause or a person. In 1993, Raschke was one of hundreds of religious leaders leading protests against Madonna's Girlie Show World Tour, which began in Bayamón, Puerto Rico. Protests did not stop the concert from taking place.

Raschke generally supports the New Progressive Party (PNP). In 2019, he supported Ricardo Rosselló, the governor, who was forced to resign for Telegramgate. Raschke attended the protests demanding that Rosselló not resign and to rescind his resignation once he had. During the protests, Raschke was making declarations with a megaphone, about different, past governors' immoral conduct in La Fortaleza, the governor's mansion. When a 60-year woman resident of the Old San Juan neighborhood, yelled that Raschke was corrupt, she was arrested. He and other religious leaders of Puerto Rico later met with Wanda Vázquez, Rosselló's successor.

Raschke has been one of several religious leaders to be singled out by Pedro Julio Serrano, a Puerto Rican LGBT and human rights activist, for spreading homophobia.

== See also ==
- List of Puerto Ricans
- German immigration to Puerto Rico
