= Oreste Ramos =

Puerto Rican politician (1946–2026)

Member of the Puerto Rico Senate from the San Juan district
- In office 1977–1997

Personal details
- Born: Oreste Virgilio Ramos Díaz; March 23, 1946 Manatí, Puerto Rico
- Died: November 17, 2026 (aged 80) San Juan, Puerto Rico
- Party: New Progressive Party
- Education: University of Puerto Rico School of Law (JD)
- Profession: Politician, lawyer

Oreste Ramos Díaz (March 23, 1946 – November 17, 2026) was a Puerto Rican intellectual, lawyer and politician. He served as a member of the Senate of Puerto Rico from 1977 to 1996, representing the New Progressive Party (PNP).

== Life and career ==
Ramos started his political activity during his university years, when he chaired the Pro-Statehood University Youth. In 1967, he took part in the founding of the New Progressive Party (PNP) and became the first president of the Youth of that party.

He was first elected to the Senate of Puerto Rico at the 1976 elections. He represented the District of San Juan, and was reelected in 1980, 1984, 1988, and 1992. He did not seek reelection in the 1996 general election.

In 2008, Ramos attempted a comeback, but was defeated at the PNP primaries. The next year, Ramos was one of the candidates considered to fill the vacancy left by former senator Jorge de Castro Font, who resigned to his chair after being convicted by federal authorities. However, Melinda Romero was chosen.

After that, Ramos has worked as a legal advisor for the Senate and for Representative Liza Fernández.

Ramos died on November 17, 2026, at the age of 80.

Senate of Puerto Rico
Preceded by Mercedes Torres Torres	Minority Whip of the Puerto Rico Senate; 1985–1988	Succeeded by Aníbal Marrero Pérez
