= Margarita Nolasco Santiago =

Puerto Rican politician

Member of the Puerto Rico Senate from the at-large district
- In office 2008–2019

President pro tempore of the Senate of Puerto Rico
- In office 2008–2012
- Preceded by: Orlando Parga
- Succeeded by: Jose Luis Dalmau

Member of the Puerto Rico Senate from the Guayama district
- In office 2004–2008

Majority Speaker of the Senate of Puerto Rico
- In office 2005–2008
- Preceded by: Jorge de Castro Font
- Succeeded by: Roberto Arango

Majority Whip of the Senate of Puerto Rico
- In office 2005–2008

Mayor of Coamo
- In office 1996–2000
- Preceded by: Carlos Luis Torres Santiago
- Succeeded by: Juan Carlos García Padilla

Executive Director of the Puerto Rico Automobile Accident Compensation Administration
- In office 2019–2020
- Governor: Ricardo Rosselló

Personal details
- Born: August 25, 1948 (age 78) Coamo, Puerto Rico
- Party: New Progressive Party
- Other political affiliations: Democratic
- Children: Angel Miguel (b. 1979)
- Education: Pontifical Catholic University of Puerto Rico (BA); New York State University (M.Ed.); Interamerican University of Puerto Rico (Ed.D)
- Profession: Politician; senator; mayor

Margarita Nolasco Santiago is a Puerto Rican politician, senator, and former Mayor of Coamo. She has been a member of the Senate of Puerto Rico since 2004.

== Early years and studies ==
Margarita Nolasco graduated at Florencio Santiago High School in Coamo. She obtained her bachelor's degree from the Pontifical Catholic University of Puerto Rico, and her master's degree from State University of New York, both in Education with a Major in Mathematics. She then completed her Doctorate in Education with a Major in Curriculum from the Interamerican University of Puerto Rico.

== Professional career ==
After receiving her bachelor's degree, Nolasco worked for the Puerto Rico Department of Education in Barranquitas High School. After finishing her master's degree, she worked as a mathematics teacher at the Interamerican University of Puerto Rico in Barranquitas. Two years later, she was appointed as Coordinator of Academic Affairs of the same institution.

After some time, she transferred to the Interamerican University of San Germán where she worked as Director of the General Education Program. She then transferred to the Ponce Campus where she worked as Dean of Academic Affairs.

She is co-author of two books in mathematics with McGraw-Hill.

== Political career ==
Nolasco began her political career in 1996, when she was elected as Mayor of Coamo. She ran again in the 2000 elections, but lost to the candidate of the Popular Democratic Party.

In 2004, she was elected to the Senate of Puerto Rico for the District of Guayama. She became the Majority Whip of her party, and eventually the Majority Speaker. During that term, she presided the Commission of Superior Education, among others.

For the 2008 general elections, Nolasco ran for Senator at-large after winning a slot at the PNP primaries. She was elected and appointed as President pro tempore by President Thomas Rivera Schatz.

In 2019 she presented her resignation to the Senate to become the Executive Director of the Puerto Rico Automobile Accident Compensation Administration.

== Personal life ==
Nolasco has a son: Angel Miguel Cruz Nolasco, born in 1979. She also has three grandchildren: Clarymar, Angélica Cristina, and Angel Miguel.

== See also ==
- Senate of Puerto Rico

Senate of Puerto Rico
Preceded by Jorge de Castro Font	Majority Leader of the Puerto Rico Senate; 2005–2008	Succeeded by Roberto Arango
Preceded by Orlando Parga Figueroa	President pro tempore of the Puerto Rico Senate; 2009-2012	Succeeded by José Luis Dalmau
Political offices
Preceded by Carlos Luis Torres Santiago	Mayor of Coamo, Puerto Rico; 1996-2000	Succeeded by Juan Carlos García Padilla
