= José Aponte de la Torre =

Puerto Rican mayor

José Ernesto Aponte de la Torre

Mayor of Carolina, Puerto Rico
- In office 1984 – May 5, 2007
- Preceded by: Roberto Iglesias Pérez
- Succeeded by: José Carlos Aponte Dalmau

Personal details
- Born: December 5, 1941 Cayey, Puerto Rico
- Died: May 5, 2007 (aged 65) Hato Rey, Puerto Rico
- Party: Popular Democratic Party (PPD)
- Spouse: Carmen Idalia Dalmau Ferrer
- Education: University of Puerto Rico (B.Ed.); City University of New York (MBA)

José Ernesto Aponte de la Torre (December 5, 1941 – May 5, 2007) was a Puerto Rican politician, and was the mayor of Carolina, Puerto Rico for 22 years.

== Biography ==
Aponte de la Torre was born and raised in Cayey, Puerto Rico in 1941. He was the son of Ernesto Aponte Mendoza, who had fought at World War II with the 65th Infantry Regiment, and Justina de la Torre. When his father died in the Korean War he and his mother moved to Caguas. It was in Caguas where years later he would meet Carmen Idalia Dalmau Ferrer, who would be his wife later on.

Aponte then moved to Carolina and continued college. He obtained a Bachelor in Education with a concentration in Industrial Arts at the University of Puerto Rico in Río Piedras and a Master in Administration and Supervision at the University of New York. Aponte became a schoolteacher and directed the Vocational School of Carolina, Carlos F. Daniels, before joining the politics of the island.

He joined the Popular Democratic Party and was elected as the mayor of Carolina in 1984, succeeding Roberto Iglesias Pérez. He made major changes in the city, pulling it off from a deficit and significantly improving the economics. Aponte was also the director of the Mayor's Association from 2001 to 2006 when he retired from that charge.

Aponte was married to Daly Dalmau, and had three children, José Carlos, Ernesto, and Javier, and four grandchildren.

On May 5, 2007, Aponte died at the Intensive Care Unit of the Hospital del Maestro in Hato Rey at age of 65. He had been fighting respiratory complications since December 2006 and had been in the intensive care unit for over 27 days. Aponte had recently stopped smoking after more than 40 years. He was buried at Cementerio La Resurrección in Carolina, Puerto Rico.

Aponte was succeeded by his older son, José Carlos Aponte Dalmau. This was announced May 10, 2007.

== Legacy ==
The airport in Ceiba, Puerto Rico is named after him. The State Government Services Building in Carolina was named after former Mayor Jose Aponte de la Torre. The Municipal Service Center in the Isla Verde sector of Carolina was named after José Aponte de la Torre.
