= Kimmey Raschke =

Puerto Rican politician

Kimmey Raschke Martínez

Member of the Puerto Rico Senate from the San Juan district
- In office 2009–2012

Personal details
- Born: January 17, 1974 (age 52) San Juan, Puerto Rico
- Party: New Progressive Party
- Education: Universidad del Sagrado Corazón (BA)
- Profession: Politician

Kimmey Raschke Martínez (born January 17, 1974, in San Juan, Puerto Rico) is a politician and Senator. She was a member of the Senate of Puerto Rico from 2009 to 2012.

== Early years and studies ==
Kimmey Raschke was born on January 17, 1974, in San Juan, Puerto Rico. She is of Sephardi and Ashkenazi descendant. Her parents are evangelical preacher Jorge Raschke García and Isaura Martínez Rodríguez, and she has a sister: Kathryn. She studied her elementary school at the Colegio Asambleas de Dios, and finished high school at the Cristo Defensores de la Fe Academy. Raschke then obtained her bachelor's degree in journalism from the Universidad del Sagrado Corazón.

== Professional career ==
Raschke has worked as producer of the radio show Clamor con la Juventud from the Clamor Broadcasting Network radio station. She also worked at the Press Office of La Fortaleza during the governorship of Pedro Rosselló. She started working as a journalist for WKAQ-Radio serving also as an editor, news manager, and moderator of her own show called Hola Kimmey. In 2003, Raschke was nominated by the Overseas Press Club to the award "News of the Moment" for her radio story titled "La Masacre de Bayamón".

In 2005, she went on to work at the Press Office of the Puerto Rico House of Representatives. That same year, Mayor of San Juan, Jorge Santini, recruited her to serve as Director of the Office of Social Link and Religious Affairs of the Municipality of San Juan.

== Political career ==
As a result of her work with the Municipality of San Juan, she decided to run for Senator for the District of San Juan in 2008. She first succeeded at her party primaries, defeating incumbent Senator Carlos Díaz. At the 2008 general elections, she was elected along with Senator Roberto Arango. Raschke was sworn in on January 2, 2009, and was selected by fellow Senator Thomas Rivera Schatz to present his nomination for the Presidency of the Senate.

Raschke has presided the Commissions of Education and Family Affairs of the Senate. She has also been co-president of the Joint Commission of Internships in Education Pilar Barbosa. She has also served as vice-president of the Commissions of Tourism and Culture, as well as being a member of the Commissions of Rules and Calendar, Treasury, Public Safety, Judicial Affairs, Municipal Affairs, and the Joint Commission of the Comptroller's Special Reports.

In October 2011, Raschke announced she would seek reelection to the Senate in 2012, despite not counting with the support of leaders of his party and district, Jorge Santini and Aníbal Vega Borges. Santini and Representative José "Nuno" López claimed that Raschke wasn't working for the needs of the district of San Juan, and that there was a lack of communication between them.

In 2012, Raschke decided to run for Senator at large, but lost in the primaries of her party held on March 18. Two years later, she ran for the presidency of the New Progressive Party (PNP) in San Juan. However, she was defeated by Leo Díaz Urbina in the elections that were held on June 8, 2014. Raschke finished with 1,131 votes for 11.7%.
