= Ernesto Irizarry Salvá =

Puerto Rican educator and politician

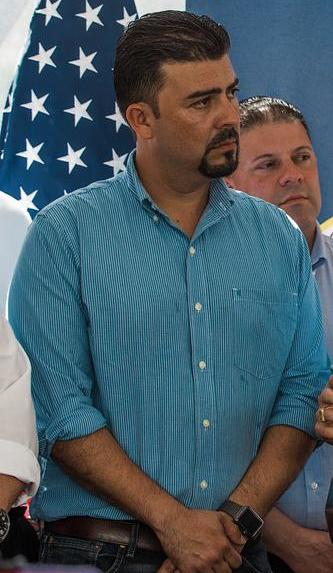

Mayor of Utuado
- In office January 14, 2013 – January 16, 2021
- Preceded by: Alan González Cancel
- Succeeded by: Jorge Pérez Heredia

Personal details
- Party: Popular Democratic (PDP)
- Spouse: Mayra Matos
- Children: 2
- Education: University of Puerto Rico at Mayagüez (BAgr)

Ernesto Irizarry Salvá is a Puerto Rican educator, politician and former mayor of Utuado. Irizarry is affiliated with the Popular Democratic Party (PDP) and has served as mayor from 2013 to 2021. Earned a Bachelor of Agriculture from the University of Puerto Rico at Mayagüez. When elected Mayor of Utuado in 2012, he was the youngest elected official in Puerto Rico. Ernesto Irizarry obtained victory in 2012 with a 50.10% of the electoral vote in Utuado and became the first mayor affiliated with the PDP to win the office of mayor of Utuado in over 20 years. This election was against Jorge Pérez Heredia, candidate for the NPP that year. In the 2016 elections for mayor of Utuado, Ernesto Irizarry Salvá won with 52.44% of the vote while his opponent, Jonathan Tossas of the NPP, obtained 46%.

Under Irizarry Salvá's term as mayor of Utuado, he received honors from the White House for his work in the municipality after Hurricane Maria. He was one of the few mayors of Puerto Rico bestowed with this honor.

On July 20, 2019, Irizarry addressed governor Ricardo Rosselló, saying the infrastructure problems of Utuado were yet to be resolved since Hurricane Maria hit 20 September 2017. He showed video of an area of Utuado that gets bogged down when the river floods, decried his inability to pay workers for work they did after Hurricane Maria because FEMA had yet to assign federal funds, and implored Rosselló to resign as governor of Puerto Rico.

Ernesto Irizarry foreseeing that actions had to be taken to combat the COVID-19 pandemic in early 2020 had a Municipal Executive Order that applied in Utuado, the first of its kind in Puerto Rico that would fine any person that was not using a facemask in crowded areas and within less than six feet of other people. This was implemented following the recommendation of the CDC to avoid propagating the virus. At first, Irizarry Salvá was criticized but, afterwards, the Governor of Puerto Rico, Wanda Vázquez Garced, followed suit, implementing the use of facemasks in public in all of Puerto Rico.

Ernesto Irizarry Salvá ran for a third term as mayor for the 2020 elections but ultimately lost to Jorge Pérez Heredia (NPP), who ran for the office of mayor a second time against Irizarry Salvá, the first being the 2012 elections.
