= Juan Carlos García Padilla =

Puerto Rican politician

Hon. Juan Carlos García Padilla

Mayor of Coamo
- Incumbent
- Assumed office 2000
- Preceded by: Margarita Nolasco

Personal details
- Born: March 10, 1967 (age 59) Coamo, Puerto Rico
- Party: Popular Democratic Party
- Education: Pontifical Catholic University of Puerto Rico (MBA)
- Profession: Politician

Juan Carlos "Tato" García Padilla (born March 10, 1967) is a Puerto Rican politician and current mayor of Coamo. He is affiliated to the Popular Democratic Party (PPD).

== Early life ==
Juan Carlos García Padilla was born on March 10, 1967, in Coamo, Puerto Rico. He has five brothers, including former President of the University of Puerto Rico Antonio García Padilla and former Governor of Puerto Rico Alejandro García Padilla.

He obtained an MBA from the Pontifical Catholic University of Puerto Rico.

In 2000, García Padilla was elected as mayor of Coamo. He was reelected in 2004, 2008, 2012 and 2016, becoming the longest serving elected mayor of Coamo.
