= Antonio Soto Díaz =

Puerto Rican politician

Member of the Puerto Rico Senate from the Guayama district
- In office January 2, 2009 – September 16, 2011

Personal details
- Born: August 9, 1949 Patillas, Puerto Rico
- Died: January 4, 2016 (aged 66) Arroyo, Puerto Rico
- Party: New Progressive Party
- Spouse: Agnes Lopés Santiago
- Education: Pontifical Catholic University of Puerto Rico (BA)
- Profession: Politician

Antonio "Toñito" Soto Díaz (August 9, 1949 – January 4, 2016), commonly known as El Chuchín, was a Puerto Rican politician and former Senator.

== Early years and studies ==
Antonio Soto Díaz was born on August 9, 1949, in Patillas, Puerto Rico. He is the son of farmer Jesús Soto de Jesús and Juana Díaz Torres. He completed his elementary school at the Second Unit School of Pitahaya in Arroyo, and in 1967 graduated from Carmen Bozello de Huyke High School. In 1977 he completed his bachelor's degree in sociology with a minor in French from the Pontifical Catholic University of Puerto Rico.

== Professional career ==
Soto described himself in an interview as a "hard worker". He said he worked as a barber, school teacher, butcher, carpenter, among other jobs.

In 1978, Soto began law studies in Ponce. At the same time, he entered the professional world, developing an interest in auto sales. He decided to move to Florida and in 1989 became an auto salesman. In 1996, he returned to Puerto Rico, establishing his own auto dealer called Toñito Soto Auto Sales, in Arroyo.

== Political career ==
Soto Díaz was elected to the Senate of Puerto Rico for the Guayama District at the 2008 general elections. Soto received 24.96% of the votes, along with Carlos Javier Torres from the same party. During his time in the Senate, Soto was President of the Committee of Commerce and Cooperativism, as well as vice-president of the Committees of Banking, Consumer Affairs and Public Corporations. He was also a member of the Committees of Agriculture and Government.

On May 31, 2011, Soto admitted that someone had given him a car, specifically a Bentley, because he "was a good guy". This ignited an investigation from the Ethics Committee on the senator's finances which showed some irregularities. Aside of this, there were lawsuits filed by members of his party (Thomas Rivera Schatz) and of the opposing party (Eder Ortiz), among others.

The senator was also under criticism for other reasons, like spending too much time in the media, collaborating in radio and comedy shows. He also made an attempt to hire a known model, Yadira Hidalgo, and insinuated he had done it for her physical attributes. Although he denied the claims, the President of the Senate, Thomas Rivera Schatz, ordered him to cancel the pending contract. After that, Soto Díaz claimed he knew witchcraft and said "the ones that twisted my words, will pay". However, he also said that he would dedicate more time to his job as senator instead of "parading to the press".

Several days later, more irregularities arose from the financial reports of his campaign indicating false reports, illegal contributions, and incongruencies in revenues. Soto Díaz denied any wrongdoing and swore he wouldn't resign to his position.

However, on September 14, 2011, Soto Díaz presented his resignation to the Senate of Puerto Rico.

== Legal and health troubles ==
After his resignation from the Senate, Soto Díaz was formally accused of tax evasion and illicit enrichment, when he allegedly received money from the legislative funds for diets illegally. In December 2013, he was presented with the documents regarding the accusations which stated that the events had occurred during a trip to the Dominican Republic.

During the course of the trial, the procedures were repeatedly delayed by alleged health problems of Soto. In 2013, he underwent open-heart surgery, which prompted his defense to seek an arrangement. In December 2015, Soto Díaz pleaded guilty to the charges as part of a settlement in which he would have to return approximately $200,000 to the government.

== Death ==
On January 4, 2016, Soto Díaz was found dead in bed by his wife Agnes Lopés Santiago. His doctor informed that he had died of a heart attack while sleeping. A funeral service for Soto was held at the Convention Center of Arroyo, although according to one of his sons, he didn't want one. His remains were later cremated.

Among the politicians that attended the service were Senator Thomas Rivera Schatz, who referred to him as "a good human being". Former senators Rolando Crespo and Héctor Martínez Maldonado were also among those that attended the funeral.

== Personal life ==
At the time of his death, Soto was married to Agnes Lopés Santiago. They had two children together: Gladimar and Anthony. Soto also had five other children from other relationships: Yadira and Juan Gabriel Soto Martínez, Antonio and Anthony Soto Rivera, and Jinell Soto Figueroa.
