= Julissa Nolasco =

Puerto Rican politician

Julissa Nolasco Ortíz

Member of the Puerto Rico House of Representatives from the 23rd District
- In office January 2, 2009 – January 1, 2013
- Preceded by: Rafael García Colón
- Succeeded by: Nelson Torres Yordán

Personal details
- Born: October 25, 1968 (age 57) New York, NY
- Party: New Progressive Party (PNP)
- Education: Universidad del Sagrado Corazón (BA); Pontifical Catholic University of Puerto Rico (Ph.D)

Catherine Julissa Nolasco Ortíz is a Puerto Rican politician affiliated with the New Progressive Party (PNP). She was a member of the Puerto Rico House of Representatives from 2009 to 2013 representing District 23.

== Early years and studies ==
Julissa Nolasco studied elementary school at the Colegio de la Inmaculada Concepción in Guayanilla. She graduated high school from the Luis Muñoz Marín High School in Yauco.

Nolasco received a bachelor's degree in Humanities from the Universidad del Sagrado Corazón in San Juan, and a Doctorate degree in Clinic Psychology from the Pontifical Catholic University of Puerto Rico in Ponce.

== Political career ==
Before entering active politics, Nolasco served as a Legislative advisor. She was first elected to the House of Representatives of Puerto Rico at the 2008 general election, to represent District 23. During her first term, she presided the Commission of Health. However, in June 2010, Speaker Jenniffer González removed her from the position claiming she was not satisfied with Nolasco's performance.

On October 23, 2011, Nolasco presented her candidacy for Mayor of Guayanilla for the 2012 elections. However, she was defeated by Janice González at the 2012 primaries, obtaining only 11.73% of the votes.
