= Angel Muñoz =

Puerto Rican politician

Member of the Puerto Rico House of Representatives from the 18th District
- In office January 2, 2013 – January 1, 2017
- Preceded by: David Bonilla Cortés
- Succeeded by: José Pérez Cordero

Personal details
- Born: March 25, 1960 (age 66) Aguada, Puerto Rico
- Party: New Progressive Party (PNP)
- Education: Interamerican University of Puerto Rico at San Germán (B.Acy, BMgt)

Angel Muñoz Suárez, is a Puerto Rican politician affiliated with the New Progressive (PNP). He was elected to the Puerto Rico House of Representatives in 2012 to represent District 18.

He holds two bachelor's degrees, one of them in Accounting and the other in Management, both from the Interamerican University of Puerto Rico, San Germán Campus. In 1997, Muñoz Suarez obtained a master's degree in Industrial Management. The following year, 1998, he obtained his second master's degree, this time in Human Resources Administration, also from the Interamerican University, San Germán Campus.
