= Orlando Parga =

Puerto Rican politician

Orlando Parga Figueroa

Member of the Puerto Rico Senate from the at-large district
- In office April 11, 1999 – January 1, 2009
- Preceded by: Roberto Rexach Benítez

President pro tempore of the Senate of Puerto Rico
- In office 2005–2008
- Preceded by: Velda González
- Succeeded by: Margarita Nolasco

Minority Whip of the Senate of Puerto Rico
- In office 2001–2005
- Preceded by: Velda González
- Succeeded by: Sila Mari González

Personal details
- Born: February 6, 1939 (age 87) Mayagüez, Puerto Rico
- Party: New Progressive Party
- Other political affiliations: Republican
- Spouse: Teresita Aponte Vázquez
- Children: 3 (Waldo, Ana Ivette, Carlos Manuel)
- Education: University of Puerto Rico; State University of New York (BA)
- Profession: Politician

Orlando Parga Figueroa (born February 6, 1939, in Mayagüez, Puerto Rico) is a Puerto Rican politician and former member of the Senate of Puerto Rico. He served as President pro tempore of the Senate from 2005 to 2009.

== Early years and studies ==
Orlando Parga Figueroa was born on February 6, 1939, in Mayagüez, Puerto Rico. His father, Orlando Parga Tossas, was a leader of the Partido Estadista Republicano and a right-hand man to its leader, Miguel A. García Méndez.

Parga studied in various schools in Toa Baja, Bayamón, and San Juan. He continued his college studies at the University of Puerto Rico, and then at the State University of New York (SUNY) receiving a Bachelor's degree in Public Administration.

== Journalism career ==
Parga worked for several years for the weekly newspaper La Opinión. He worked as City Editor and Editor of La Opinión from 1962 to 1968, and then as Director from 1973 to 1975. He has also written columns for other newspapers like El Mundo, La Semana, and El Nuevo Día.

== Political career ==
=== First administrative and adviser positions ===
Parga began his political career when he was elected state president of the Republican Youth in 1957, a post to which he was reelected in 1960 and 1964. In 1961, Parga became the first Puerto Rican to be named as part of the United States Republican Youth National Committee. During this time, he also served Press Aide to Senator Miguel A. García Méndez. In 1968, Parga ran unsuccessfully for an at-large seat in the Puerto Rico House of Representatives under the Republican Party, which would disappear following that year's elections. He then worked as Director of Public Relations at the Automobile Accidents Compensation Administration (ACAA) from 1969 to 1973.

From 1975 to 1976, Parga served as Press Aide to Carlos Romero Barceló, who was Mayor of San Juan at the time. He also served as Communications Advisor to another Mayor of San Juan, Baltasar Corrada del Río, from 1985 to 1988. Parga also served as a consultant to Mayors of Guaynabo Alejandro Cruz and Héctor O'Neill. From 1993 to 1994 he also served as Director of the Press, Communications, and Public Relations Office of the Senate of Puerto Rico.

=== Career as Senator: 1999–2009 ===
==== First term as Senator: 1999–2004 ====
He ran unsuccessfully for Senator at-large in the 1991 and 1995 PNP primaries. Parga was finally elected to the post in a special election held on April 11, 1999, to fill the vacancy left by former Senate President Roberto Rexach Benitez' resignation. At the 2000 general elections, he was reelected to his seat and chosen as Senate Minority Whip.

==== Second term and party split: 2005–2008 ====
Parga was re-elected at the 2004 elections. However, when the defeated 2004 PNP gubernatorial candidate, Pedro Rosselló, gained a seat in the Senate and tried to oust President Kenneth McClintock, Parga was one of the six Senators that supported the latter and refused to support Rosselló. For their loyalty, they became known as "Los Auténticos", which in turn, ignited a series of schemes to coerce them into supporting Rosselló.

In November 2005, it was revealed that the Puerto Rico Capitol's surveillance camera system was allegedly misused to blackmail fellow Senator Carlos Díaz, one of the so-called "Auténticos". McClintock appointed Parga to chair the tripartisan Blue Ribbon Committee looking into the matter. His refusal to cover-up sworn statements suggesting administrative irregularities in the administration of the House of Representatives triggered the New Progressive Party directorate to recommend his expulsion, along with Senate President Kenneth McClintock. The party recommended the expulsion of the six Senators in March 2006. According to McClintock, this recommendation was rejected by a General Assembly on August 20, 2006.

Within the Senate, he presided the Committee on Consumer Affairs and Government Reports. As a result of the May 2005 split within the majority delegation, he assumed the chairmanship of the Federal, Industrial and Economic Affairs Committee of the Senate and of the Cordova and Fernos Congressional Internship Joint Committee. After Senator Héctor Martínez resigned the chairmanship of the Senate's Public Safety Committee, Parga was appointed its acting chair by the Senate President.

On July 5, 2007, Parga announced that, rather than file for reelection under the PNP banner, he would aspire to become the first independent candidate to win an election to the Senate and put all his Senate leadership positions at McClintock's disposal. The Senate President immediately reiterated his trust in him, although he would no longer appear in the slate of PNP candidates. In November 2008 he was not reelected while running as an independent.

== Recent years ==
Actually, as a political analyst, Parga has not held his punches when commenting on Puerto Rico's status and politics issues. In 2010, Parga said in an interview that "being a legislator in this island is worth nothing. When I was young, I would stand in the Senate gallery and dream about being a Senator. It used to be something prestigious."

Parga is a political analyst on NotiUno 630 a local radio network and served as a government consultant and the House of Representatives of Puerto Rico[Legislative Services of Puerto Rico], 2009–2013.

== Personal life ==
Parga is married to Teresita Aponte Vázquez. He has three children, Waldo, Ana Ivette, and Carlos Manuel from a previous marriage. Parga and Aponte reside in Caguas.

== See also ==
- List of Puerto Ricans
- Senate of Puerto Rico

Senate of Puerto Rico
Preceded by Velda González	Minority Whip of the Puerto Rico Senate; 2001–2005	Succeeded by Sila María González Calderón
Preceded by Velda González	President pro tempore of the Puerto Rico Senate; 2005–2008	Succeeded by Margarita Nolasco Santiago
