= Angelo Cruz Ramos =

Puerto Rican politician

Mayor of Ceiba
- In office January 14, 2013 – January 14, 2021
- Preceded by: Pedro Colón Osorio
- Succeeded by: Samuel Rivera Baez

Personal details
- Party: New Progressive Party (PNP)
- Education: Interamerican University of Puerto Rico (M.Ed.)

Angelo Cruz Ramos is a Puerto Rican politician and the former mayor of Ceiba. Cruz is affiliated with the New Progressive Party (PNP) and has served as mayor since 2013. He has a master's degree in mathematics as a secondary education from the Interamerican University of Puerto Rico
