= Eder E. Ortiz Ortiz =

Puerto Rican politician

Eder Ortiz Ortiz

Member of the Puerto Rico Senate from the at-large district
- In office 2009 – December 31, 2011

Personal details
- Born: April 18, 1969 (age 57) Orocovis, Puerto Rico
- Party: Popular Democratic Party
- Education: University of Puerto Rico (BA); Interamerican University of Puerto Rico School of Law (JD)
- Profession: Politician, Attorney

Eder Ortiz Ortiz (born April 18, 1969) is a Puerto Rican politician and Senator. He served as a member of the Senate of Puerto Rico from 2009 to 2011.

== Early years and studies ==
Eder Ortiz Ortiz was born on April 18, 1969. He is the oldest of three siblings. Ortiz obtained his bachelor's degree in accounting from the University of Puerto Rico. He then obtained his Juris doctor from the Interamerican University of Puerto Rico School of Law in 1998.

== Professional career ==
Ortiz has worked as an executive in several multinational enterprises in Central America, United States, and the Caribbean. He was a legislative advisor for the Joint Commission on the Comptroller's Special Reports, and the Commission of Public Integrity.

Ortiz has also worked as a private attorney until December 2008.

== Political career ==
Ortiz was sworn in as Senator At-large after the 2008 general elections according to the Law of Minority. He has served as Speaker for his party in the Commissions of Economic Development and Planning, Commerce and Cooperativism, Banking, Consumer Affairs, and others.

On December 20, 2011, Ortiz announced his resignation from the Senate, effective on December 31, 2011, and became Electoral Commissioner for the Popular Democratic Party.
