= Arnaldo Jiménez Valle =

Puerto Rican politician

Member of the Puerto Rico House of Representatives from the 15th District
- In office January 2, 2009 – January 1, 2013
- Preceded by: Efraín Concepción
- Succeeded by: César Hernández

Personal details
- Born: December 10, 1965 (age 60) Arecibo, Puerto Rico
- Party: New Progressive Party (PNP)
- Education: University of Puerto Rico at Arecibo (BBA)

Arnaldo Iván Jiménez Valle (born December 10, 1965) is a Puerto Rican politician affiliated with the New Progressive Party (PNP). He was a member of the Puerto Rico House of Representatives from 2009 to 2013, representing District 15.

== Early years and studies ==
Arnaldo Iván Jiménez Valle was born in Arecibo on December 10, 1965. He is the oldest of two siblings. He began his studies at the Colegio La Milagrosa in Arecibo, and finished high school at the Trina Padilla de Sanz High School. From an early age, he worked as a paperboy for El Nuevo Día. When he was 16 years old, he worked at Wendy's restaurant.

Jiménez completed a Bachelor's degree in Business Administration, with a major in Accounting, from the University of Puerto Rico at Arecibo.

== Professional career ==
Jiménez worked as an Emergency Room Coordinator at Hospital Dr. Susoni in Arecibo. After that, he worked as head teller at Ponce Bank, and later Chief of Accounting at International Insurance. He also worked as Manager at RG Premier Bank.

At one point, Jiménez started his own business called North Insurance Finance, until he decided to join the family business: Arcadio Auto Import, Inc. He worked there for 15 years, until he was approached to be a public servant.

== Political career ==
Jiménez was first elected to the House of Representatives of Puerto Rico at the 2008 general election. During that term, he presided the Commission of Agriculture, and served as Vicepresident of the Commission of Recreation. He was also a member of the Commissions of Health, Economic Development, and Public Safety, among others.

Jiménez ran again for senator, in 2020.

== Personal life ==
Jiménez is married, and has lived in Hatillo with his family since 2003.

Jiménez is an avid softball player.
