= David Bonilla Cortés =

Puerto Rican politician

Member of the Puerto Rico House of Representatives from the 18th District
- In office January 2, 2009 – January 1, 2013
- Preceded by: Tomás Bonilla
- Succeeded by: Angel Muñoz

Personal details
- Born: February 1, 1974 (age 52) New York City, New York
- Party: New Progressive Party (PNP)

David Bonilla Cortés (born February 1, 1974) is a Puerto Rican politician affiliated with the New Progressive Party (PNP). He was a member of the Puerto Rico House of Representatives from 2009 to 2013 representing District 18.

== Early years and studies ==
David Bonilla Cortés was born on February 1, 1974, in New York City, New York. He is the youngest of three children. When he was 9 months old, his parents returned to Puerto Rico. When he was 15 years old, his parents sent him with his brother back to New York with a relative, with hopes of a better education.

On July 7, 1989, while walking with his brother on Port Jefferson, Long Island, they witnessed an explosion in a ship that was refueling. Bonilla and his brother jumped in the water to help the drowning crew.

Bonilla returned to Puerto Rico where he completed his high school studies. Later, he completed a Bachelor's degree in Criminal Justice.

== Professional career ==
After graduating from high school, Bonilla joined the Puerto Rico Police Department, where he served for 14 years.

== Political career ==
In 2007, Bonilla decided to run for a vacant seat for District 18 in the House of Representatives of Puerto Rico. After winning the primary, he was forced to resign from the Police on December 31, 2007.

Bonilla was elected as Representative at the 2008 general election. During his first term, he presided the Commission of Sports and Recreation, and was a member of the Commissions of Youth, Agriculture, Federal Relations, Veteran Affairs, Transportation, and others.

In 2012, Bonilla attempted to run for reelection, but was defeated in the PNP primaries by Angel Muñoz.

== Personal life ==
Has two children Adrianna and Adrian Bonilla.
