= Carlos Molina (politician) =

Puerto Rican politician (born 1974)

Mayor of Arecibo
- In office January 14, 2013 – January 13, 2021
- Preceded by: Lemuel Soto
- Succeeded by: Carlos “Tito” Ramírez Irizarry

Secretary of Department of Corrections and Rehabilitation
- In office January 2, 2009 – August 11, 2011
- Governor: Luis Fortuño
- Preceded by: Miguel Pereira Castillo
- Succeeded by: Jesús González

Personal details
- Born: August 27, 1974 (age 52) Arecibo, Puerto Rico
- Party: New Progressive Party (PNP)
- Other political affiliations: Republican
- Education: Pontifical Catholic University of Puerto Rico (BCJ)

Carlos Molina Rodríguez (born August 27, 1974) is a Puerto Rican politician and the former mayor of Arecibo. Molina is affiliated with the New Progressive Party (PNP) and served as mayor from 2013 until 2021. Previously, He studied primary and higher in the public schools of the town of Arecibo. While he worked as official in custody of the Puerto Rico Department of Corrections and Rehabilitation, he started and completed his degree of Bachelor in Criminal Justice at the Pontifical Catholic University of Puerto Rico, where he was President of the Student Council prime of the institution. Molina served as Secretary of the Puerto Rico Department of Corrections and Rehabilitation from 2009 to 2011, under Governor Luis Fortuño.

Carlos Molina was the president of Puerto Rico Mayors Federation from 2017-2020 after succeeding Hector O'Neill.

== Tenure ==
On November 3, 2020 Molina lost the re election for Mayor of Arecibo against Carlos “Tito” Ramírez Irizarry who will be the next Mayor after January 2021. At the end of the mayor's term the municipality remained with a deficit of around 85 million. Before the end of his tenure the mayor announced that the municipality had begun to pay off debt to the Puerto Rico Department of Treasury. During the mayor's eight year term he duplicated the municipal debt and did not carry out property inventories. As part of the end of his term the mayor was entitled to take $69,000 worth of vacation days. In 2017 the mayor's salary was raised to $96,000.

After completing his term Molina created a company which has made contracts as advisors with the municipalities of Quebradillas, Cabo Rojo and the CRIM agency.
