= Pedro Colón Osorio =

Puerto Rican politician

Mayor of Ceiba
- In office January 14, 2008 – January 13, 2013
- Preceded by: Gilberto Lex Camacho
- Succeeded by: Angelo Cruz Ramos

Personal details
- Born: November 28, 1937 (age 88) Ceiba, Puerto Rico
- Party: New Progressive Party (PNP)
- Spouse: Gloria Vega

Military service
- Allegiance: United States of America
- Branch/service: United States Army; United States Army Reserve
- Rank: Colonel
- Battles/wars: Vietnam War

Pedro Colón Osorio is a Puerto Rican politician and former mayor of Ceiba, Puerto Rico. Colón is affiliated with the New Progressive Party (PNP) and served as mayor from 2009 to 2013. Prior been the mayor of Ceiba, Puerto Rico, Pedro Colón Osorio had a 37 year career in the military that includes service in the Vietnam War and later in the United States Army Reserve until he retired with the rank of Colonel.
