= Eddie Manso =

Puerto Rican politician

Mayor of Loíza
- In office January 15, 2005 – January 15, 2017
- Preceded by: Ferdin Carrasquilo
- Succeeded by: Julia Nazario

Personal details
- Born: December 14, 1961 (age 64)
- Party: New Progressive Party of Puerto Rico (PNP)
- Education: Universidad del Este (BBA)

Eddie Manso Fuentes is a Puerto Rican politician and the former mayor of Loíza. Manso is affiliated with the New Progressive Party (PNP) and he served as mayor from 2005 to 2017. Has a degree in Business Administration and Management from Universidad del Este.
