= Lemuel Soto =

Puerto Rican politician

Mayor of Arecibo
- In office January 14, 2005 – January 13, 2013
- Preceded by: Frankie Hernández
- Succeeded by: Carlos Molina

Personal details
- Party: New Progressive Party (PNP)

Lemuel Soto Santiago is a Puerto Rican politician and former mayor of Arecibo. Soto is affiliated with the New Progressive Party (PNP) and served as mayor from 2005 to 2013.
