= Bernardo Márquez García =

Puerto Rican politician

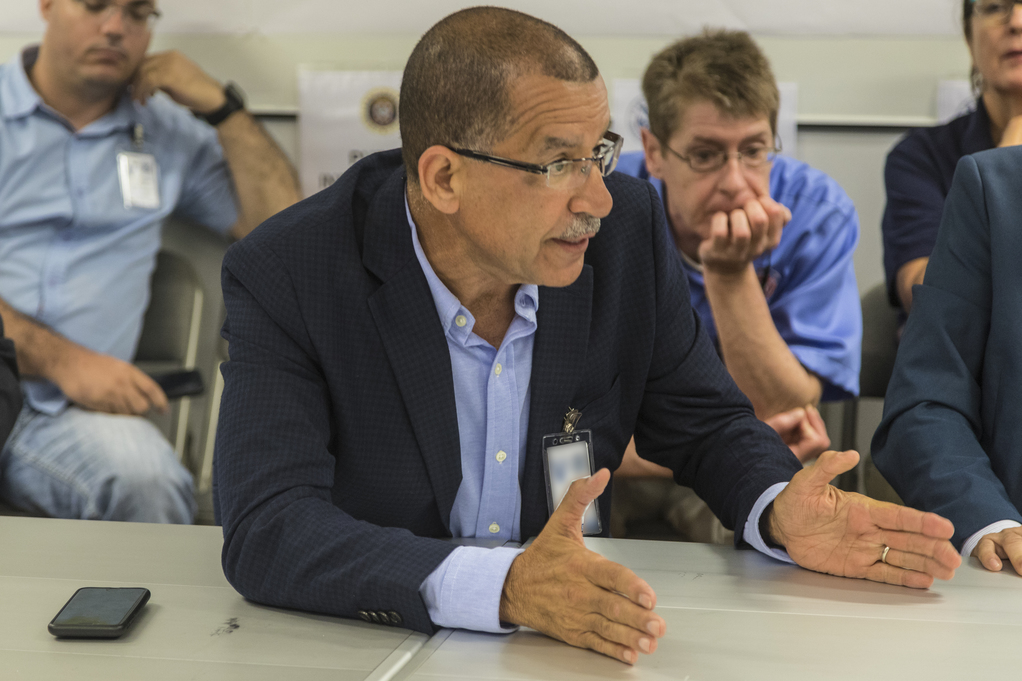
- Márquez in March 2018

Mayor of Toa Baja
- Incumbent
- Assumed office January 2, 2017
- Preceded by: Aníbal Vega Borges

Member of the Puerto Rico House of Representatives from the 10th District
- In office January 2, 2005 – January 1, 2013
- Preceded by: Aníbal Vega Borges
- Succeeded by: Pedro Julio Santiago

Personal details
- Born: Toa Baja, Puerto Rico
- Party: New Progressive Party (PNP)
- Children: 3
- Education: University of Puerto Rico (BBA, MBA)

Bernardo "Betito" Márquez García is the Mayor of Toa Baja affiliated with the New Progressive Party (PNP). He was a member of the Puerto Rico House of Representatives from 2005 to 2013 representing District 10.

== Early years and studies ==
Bernardo Márquez was born on the Barrio Pájaros Candelaria of Toa Baja. During his school years, he was an avid sports athlete, distinguishing himself in baseball, basketball, and volleyball.

Márquez completed his Bachelor and Master's degree in Business Administration at the University of Puerto Rico.

== Professional life ==
Márquez worked as a college professor at the University of Puerto Rico and the Interamerican University of Puerto Rico. He also worked as owner of the Selectos Supermarket, on the Barrio Candelaria Arenas.

== Political career ==
Márquez was first elected to the House of Representatives of Puerto Rico at the 2004 general election, where he was elected to represent District 10. He was reelected in 2008. Márquez chose not to run for reelection at the 2012 general election.

In 2015, Márquez announced his intention to run for Mayor of Toa Baja challenging longtime incumbent Aníbal Vega Borges. On June 5, 2016, Márquez defeated Vega Borges in what was classified by some newspapers as the "surprise of the primaries".

== Personal life ==
Márquez is married and has three children. In 2020, one of his sons, José Bernando Márquez, was elected to the House of Representatives of Puerto Rico for the Citizens' Victory Movement party. He's currently the oldest of five brothers.His father died in December 2022.

House of Representatives of Puerto Rico
Preceded by Aníbal Vega Borges	Member of the Puerto Rico House of Representatives from the 10th District; 2005–2013	Succeeded by Pedro Julio Santiago
Political offices
Preceded by Aníbal Vega Borges	Mayor of Toa Baja, Puerto Rico; 2013–present	Incumbent
