= Pellé Santiago =

Puerto Rican politician

Pedro "Pellé" Julio Santiago
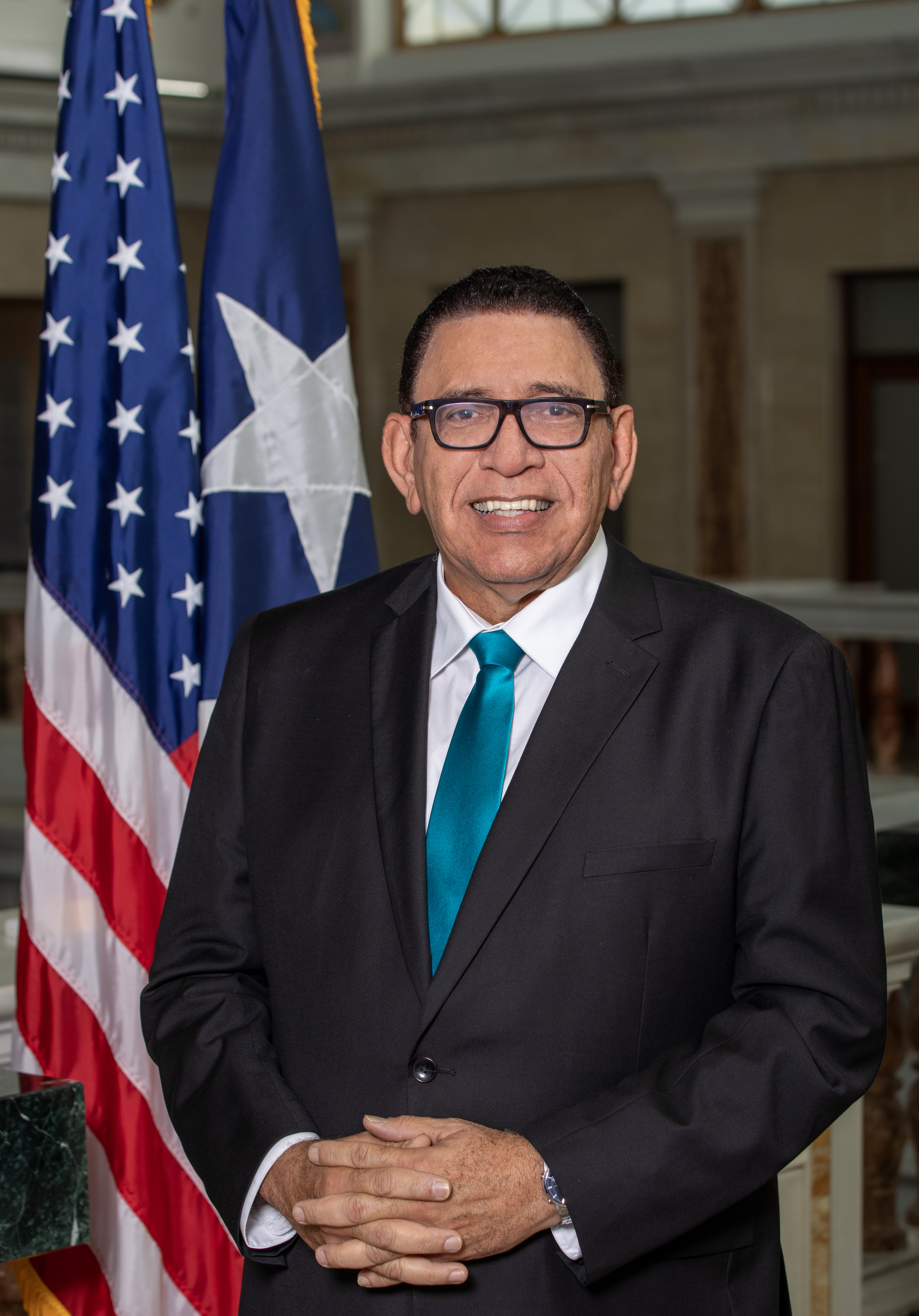

Member of the Puerto Rico House of Representatives from the 10th District
- Incumbent
- Assumed office January 2, 2025
- In office January 2, 2013 – January 2, 2020
- Preceded by: Bernardo Márquez
- Succeeded by: Deborah Soto Arroyo

Personal details
- Born: March 25, 1961 (age 65) San Juan, Puerto Rico
- Party: New Progressive Party (PNP)

Pedro Julio Santiago Guzman (born March 25, 1961), also known as "Pellé", is a Puerto Rican politician affiliated with the New Progressive Party (PNP). He was elected to the Puerto Rico House of Representatives in 2012 to represent District 10.
