= Miriam Ramírez =

Former member of the Senate of Puerto Rico

Member of the Puerto Rico Senate from the at-large district
- In office 2001–2005

Personal details
- Born: June 24, 1941 (age 84) Caguas, Puerto Rico, U.S.
- Party: New Progressive
- Other political affiliations: Republican
- Spouse: Tomas Ferrer (died in 1998)
- Children: 5
- Education: University of Maryland Global Campus; University of Puerto Rico, Río Piedras (BS); Complutense University of Madrid (MD)
- Website: Official website

Miriam J. Ramírez de Ferrer (born June 24, 1941 in Caguas, Puerto Rico) is a Puerto Rican leader, medical doctor, politician, and former senator. She was a member of the Senate of Puerto Rico from 2001 to 2005.

== Biography ==
Dr. Miriam J. Ramírez de Ferrer, born in Caguas, Puerto Rico in 1941, lived in Europe while her father served in the U.S. Armed Forces. She graduated in 1968 with a medical degree from the Complutense University of Madrid.

Married to a fellow physician, Dr. Tomás Ferrer, in 1974 she began practicing obstetrics and gynecology, first in San Juan, and later, when she moved with her late husband Dr. Tomas Ferrer, MD, in Mayagüez, Puerto Rico, where they raised five children.

She became active in Puerto Rico's statehood movement in the late 1970s, creating and heading Puerto Ricans for Civic Action, and after the 1980 general elections, began a movement to raise over 100,000 signatures in favor of statehood for Puerto Rico. In 2000, she was nominated for Senator at-large by her New Progressive Party (NPP) and elected a member of the Senate of Puerto Rico from 2001 to 2005, where she was a member of the NPP minority caucus, headed by fellow senator Kenneth McClintock, who appointed her as Ranking Member of the Senate's Federal and International Affairs Committee. For her efforts and close friendship with the late George H. W. Bush, she took credit for the legislation approved in the U.S. House of Representatives for self-determination for Puerto Rico.

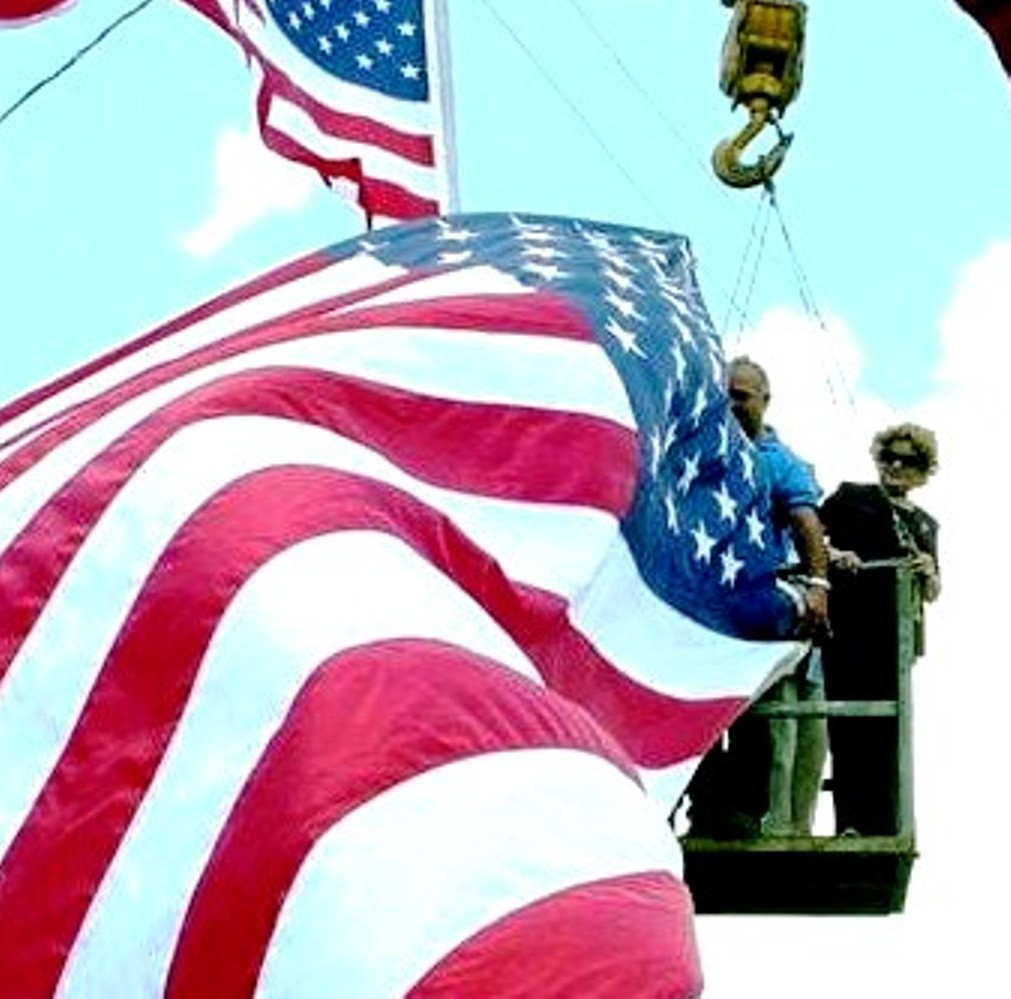
Mirriam raising United States flag in San Juan in 2001

After leaving the Senate in 2004, served as advisor on Federal, Health and Legislative Affairs for Jorge Santini, Mayor of San Juan, the Capital of Puerto Rico. Her major accomplishments while working for the city, include obtaining Federal property deed for “Casa Cuna” and other support from the Federal agencies to develop an area with multiple functions and buildings to give support, house and protect battered mothers and children. She was also instrumental in identifying resources for the financing of community projects for the city of San Juan.

As soon as the results of the March 9, 2008 primaries were announced, NPP's Second Vice President, Miriam Ramírez de Ferrer, announced her immediate resignation, saying "Effectively right now I am no longer the Second Vice President of this party. You will not see me ever again involved in active politics, party reunions or party meetings, as I now plan to become a private citizen. There's a lot of things I haven't done I want to do, and I'll also do some things I have to do to help the statehood cause. Ramírez was a candidate for Resident Commissioner in the primaries and was openly supporting Rosselló. She lost to Fortuño's candidate, Pedro Pierluisi, and to another Rosselló supporter who was also defeated, former Senate President, Charlie Rodríguez. When Ramírez was asked by the media if she will vote for Fortuño, she replied "My vote is secret".
