= Heriberto Rodríguez =

Puerto Rican politician

Heriberto "Herito" Rodríguez

Mayor of Morovis
- In office January 14, 2005 – January 2, 2017
- Preceded by: Francisco Rodríguez
- Succeeded by: Carmen Maldonado González

Personal details
- Party: New Progressive Party (PNP)

Heriberto "Herito" Rodríguez Adorno (born September 24, 1973) is a Puerto Rican politician and former mayor of Morovis. Rodríguez Adorno is affiliated with the New Progressive Party (PNP) and he served as mayor from 2005 to 2017.
