= Aníbal Vega Borges =

Puerto Rican politician

Mayor of Toa Baja
- In office January 2, 2005 – June 30, 2016
- Preceded by: Víctor Santiago Díaz
- Succeeded by: Bernardo Márquez García

Minority Speaker of the Puerto Rico House of Representatives
- In office 2002–2005
- Preceded by: Edison Misla Aldarondo
- Succeeded by: Héctor Ferrer

Member of the Puerto Rico House of Representatives for District 10
- In office 1993–2005
- Preceded by: Luis E. Cabán Dávila
- Succeeded by: Bernardo Márquez García

Personal details
- Born: June 21, 1957 (age 69) Río Piedras, Puerto Rico
- Party: New Progressive Party (PNP)
- Spouse: Nydia Ivelisse Rivera
- Education: Pontifical Catholic University of Puerto Rico School of Law (JD); University of Valladolid (Ph.D)
- Occupation: Politician

Aníbal Vega Borges is a Puerto Rican lawyer and politician. He served as mayor of Toa Baja from January 3, 2005 until June 30, 2016. He also served as a member of the Puerto Rico House of Representatives from 1993 to 2005. The official resigned after a raid for alleged irregularities in the use of federal funds in municipal accounts.

== Early life and education ==
He completed his secondary education at the Caribbean University at Bayamon. While working in private enterprise and public service, he continued his studies in the Pontifical Catholic University of Puerto Rico Ponce. In 1986, he obtained the degree of Juris Doctor. Exercise in private practice at the same time that continued graduate studies at the Pontifical Catholic University of Puerto Rico and at the University of Valladolid in Spain, obtaining the PhD in law.

== Political career ==
=== Representative ===
Vega Borges was elected as a representative for District 10 at the 1992 general elections. He was reelected in 1996 and 2000.

=== Mayor ===
Vega Borges was elected as mayor of Toa Baja at the 2004 general elections. He was reelected in 2008 receiving more than 70% of the votes. He was the mayor with the largest margin of victory.

In 2016, Vega Borges was defeated by Bernardo Márquez García at the PNP primaries. The defeat was classified by a local newspaper as "the surprise of the primary".

=== Electoral commissioner ===
On June 23, 2016, Vega Borges announced his resignation after being appointed by Ricky Rosselló as Electoral Commissioner for the Party.

House of Representatives of Puerto Rico
Preceded by Luis E. Cabán Dávila	Member of the Puerto Rico House of Representatives from the 10th district 1993–2005	Succeeded by Bernardo Márquez García
Preceded by Edison Misla Aldarondo	Minority Leader of the Puerto Rico House of Representatives; 2002-2005	Succeeded by Héctor Ferrer Ríos
Political offices
Preceded by Víctor Santiago Díaz	Mayor of Toa Baja, Puerto Rico; 2005–2017	Succeeded by Bernardo Márquez García
