= Luis León Rodríguez =

Puerto Rican politician

Luis "Tato" León

Member of the Puerto Rico House of Representatives from the 24th District
- In office January 2, 2009 – January 1, 2017
- Preceded by: Roberto Cruz Rodríguez
- Succeeded by: José A. Banchs Alemán

Personal details
- Born: June 29, 1966 (age 60) Ponce, Puerto Rico
- Party: New Progressive Party (PNP)
- Children: 2
- Education: University of Puerto Rico; Pontifical Catholic University of Puerto Rico

Luis G. "Tato" León Rodríguez (born June 29, 1966) is a Puerto Rican politician affiliated with the New Progressive Party (PNP). He has been a member of the Puerto Rico House of Representatives since 2009 representing District 24.

== Early years and studies ==
Luis G. León Rodríguez was born June 29, 1966. He began his elementary and junior high studies in Ponce. He then moved to Florida, where he completed high school in an Air Force Academy. After that, he became a pilot and completed a Bachelor's degree in Biology and Mathematics from the University of Puerto Rico. He also completed his Doctorate in Law from the Pontifical Catholic University of Puerto Rico.

== Professional career ==
León worked as an attorney for the Senate of Puerto Rico, under the presidency of Roberto Rexach Benítez. He was also appointed to the Judge Advocate General Office, of the State Command of the Puerto Rico National Guard, where he served as an attorney with the rank of lieutenant colonel.

== Political career ==
León was first elected to the House of Representatives of Puerto Rico at the 2008 general election, representing District 24. During his first term, he presided the Commissions of Integrated Development of the South Region, Veteran Affairs, and Federal Affairs.

León was reelected in 2012.

== Personal life ==
León is married and has two children.
