= Senator Díaz de la Portilla =

Senator Díaz de la Portilla may refer to:

- Alex Díaz de la Portilla (born 1964), Florida State Senate
- Miguel Díaz de la Portilla (born 1963), Florida State Senate
