= Jorge de Castro Font =

Puerto Rican politician

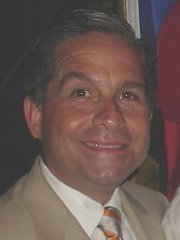

Member of the Senate of Puerto Rico
- In office 2005–2009

Member of the Puerto Rico House of Representatives
- In office 1988–2004

Personal details
- Born: Jorge Adolfo de Castro Font; September 10, 1963 (age 62) San Juan, Puerto Rico
- Party: New Progressive Party (2002–2008); Popular Democratic Party (1988–2001); Republican Party of Puerto Rico
- Education: Universidad del Sagrado Corazón

Jorge Adolfo de Castro Font (born September 10, 1963) is a former Puerto Rican senator and former member of the House of Representatives. Originally, he was a member of the Popular Democratic Party (PPD) but became an independent representative in 2001 after inner disputes with his party. In 2002, he became a member of the New Progressive Party (PNP) and was elected Senator in 2004 and 2008, despite inner struggles within the party and legal issues.

In 2008, De Castro Font was arrested by the FBI and subsequently charged with 21 counts of fraud and conspiracy. As a result, he was sentenced to 5 years in federal prison and 3 years probation.

== Early life and studies ==
Jorge de Castro Font was born in San Juan, on September 10, 1963, to former Puerto Rico Ombudsman Rafael Adolfo de Castro Campos and María Eugenia Font González. He is the grandson of Jorge Font Saldaña, one of former Gov. Luis Muñoz Marín's closest associates.

De Castro Font received his bachelor's degree in justice system from the Universidad del Sagrado Corazón in San Juan. Later on, she finishes graduate studies with a Master's in Puerto Rican History at the Center for Advanced Studies of Puerto Rico and the Caribbean. In March 1998, he completes a course on Perspectives on Leadership and Governance for the 21st Century at Harvard University's John F. Kennedy School of Government. De Castro Font was also a member of the United States Army Reserve, and served briefly with the Puerto Rico National Guard.

De Castro Font started distinguishing himself as a youth leader for the Popular Democratic Party. In 1985, he was the assistant of then-Speaker of the House of Representatives, José Ronaldo Jarabo.

== Career as representative: 1988–2004 ==
De Castro Font decided to run for an elective post in 1988. He was elected to the Puerto Rico House of Representatives in the 1988 general elections. He was 25 at the time, making him the youngest elected representative to that date. He was reelected to the post in the 1992, 1996, and 2000 general elections.

=== Independent legislator in 2001 ===
In August 2001, following internal disputes within the PPD, De Castro Font left the party to become an independent representative. There are several versions of the nature and manner of him leaving the party. While De Castro states that he willfully left the party, others suggest he was forced out.

On September 27, 2002, De Castro Font announced he was joining the ranks of the New Progressive Party (PNP) and announced his candidacy for a Senate position.

== Career as senator: 2004–2008 ==
De Castro Font went on to win the party primaries and eventually the Senate seat in the 2004 general elections. The elections resulted in a "mixed" government with PPD's Aníbal Acevedo Vilá as governor, and the PNP dominating both the House of Representatives and the Senate. The PNP majority caucus elected De Castro Font on November 4, 2004, as the Majority Leader of the newly elected Senate, while his friend Kenneth McClintock was elected President of the Senate.

=== First PNP expulsion: 2005 ("Los Auténticos") ===
In early 2005, after his narrow defeat in the 2004 gubernatorial race, former governor Pedro Rosselló announced he was aspiring for a Senate seat vacated by a freshman Senator for the district of Arecibo. After joining the Senate, he expressed his hopes of becoming president of the Senate, and asked his fellow party Senators to support him over President Kenneth McClintock. However, six Senators, including De Castro Font, refused to do so and continued supporting McClintock.

This prompted the PNP Board to expel several of these Senators, including De Castro Font, while suspending others. De Castro Font gave up his post as the Senate Majority Leader (which went to Senator Margarita Nolasco), but retained the chairmanship of the Senate Rules Committee, which allowed him to direct all floor activities in the Senate. As a result of the split within the party, McClintock appointed De Castro Font as chairman of the Judiciary Committee and the Municipal and Financial Affairs Committee, and co-chair of the Joint Select Committee on the Civil Code and the Joint Select Committee on the Penal Code.

De Castro did not recognize the party's decision to expel him and continued to identify himself both as a supporter of statehood for Puerto Rico as well as a member of the PNP. The Supreme Court of Puerto Rico, in the case McClintock vs. Rivera Schatz, annulled De Castro Font's expulsion from the party in a 5–1 decision. In a subsequent case, De Castro Font vs. Partido Nuevo Progresista, the Court confirmed his right to appear in the NPP primary ballot.

=== Second PNP expulsion: 2008 (legal troubles) ===
De Castro Font was again nominated on March 9, 2008, in the PNP primary by voters. On July 8, 2008, it was reported that De Castro Font was under investigation for fraud and corruption by the FBI, which was based on testimony by witnesses interviewed regarding a second case. The pro-statehood senator responded saying that he "has never received money in exchange for a favor".

On August 23, 2008, the Federal Bureau of Investigation raided the Senator's Capitol office, a San Juan, Puerto Rico gas station at which he was a client and his Hato Rey apartment after obtaining a search warrant from U.S. District Court Judge Francisco Besosa. On August 25, Federal agents visited the homes of some of his employees. On that date, he ceased to be the Senate Majority Leader.

The search warrants confirmed the rumor of an ongoing investigation from the FBI against De Castro Font. These events were considered by the PNP's president and candidate for Governor, Luis Fortuño, as sufficient cause to seek his disqualification as a candidate for reelection to the Senate. To this, Senator De Castro Font responded aggressively and threatened to reveal information that could link many members of the party in illicit activities, including Fortuño and his wife.

On September 9, 2008, De Castro Font voluntarily arrived at the Federico Degetau Federal Building in San Juan to "turn himself in" after allegedly receiving a phone call that morning from a close friend of Fortuño's, advising him that he was to be arrested that day. The Senator opted to show up at court, rather than be publicly arrested. It is believed that after this event, the Senator and the FBI reached an agreement to allow the Senator to turn himself in voluntarily if there was ever a warrant for his arrest.

On September 10, 2008, San Juan District Court rejected the pleas of the PNP to expel Jorge De Castro Font from the ballot for the upcoming elections. The judge determined that once a candidate has been elected in a primary by the people and has been officially certified by the Comisión Estatal de Eleciones, "he or she cannot be removed for reasons other than those specified by law". Puerto Rico electoral law states that a candidate may only be disqualified if he or she violates state or federal law, violations of internal Party policies are not sufficient cause.

== Arrest ==
On October 2, 2008, De Castro Font was arrested by the FBI at his lawyer's office in San Juan, Puerto Rico. De Castro Font was arrested and indicted on 32 federal charges including fraud, extortion, bribery and money laundering. The charges carry a maximum sentence of 20 years imprisonment. His political consultant and aide, Alberto Goachet, 67, was also indicted for honest services fraud and extortion. The case is prosecuted by the Criminal Division's Public Integrity Section headed by Chief William M. Welch II, and investigated by the FBI's San Juan Field Office. On that date, Senate President Kenneth McClintock immediately removed him as chairman of the Senate Rules Committee, appointing Senate Majority Leader Margarita Nolasco to fill the vacancy. De Castro subsequently lashed out against McClintock for being a "traitor" to him.

Surprisingly, De Castro Font won a slot in the PNP ballot at the PNP primaries, and on the 2008 general elections held on November 4, he was reelected as Senator despite his legal troubles.

On December 4, 2008, de Castro was arrested and jailed indefinitely for violating his bail conditions when, according to Federal District Court Judge Francisco Besosa he has at least three improper contacts with government witnesses. During several instances while awaiting trial, he was housed in the Federal Metropolitan Detention Center in Carcel Federal de Guaynabo, Puerto Rico. On December 21, 2008, in a letter to PNP President and Governor-elect Luis Fortuño, he announced that he was resigning the seat to which he was elected in the upcoming Senate scheduled to take office on January 2, 2009.

De Castro Font was sentenced on May 17, 2011, to 5 years in prison and 3 years probation. He awaits trial in local courts for related local corruption and tax evasion charges. One of the prisoners De Castro Font met while in jail was Alex Trujillo, a notorious former drug dealer who claimed to have become a Christian. The two became friends and began to meet nightly for prayers.

== Personal life ==
Jorge de Castro Font married Jessica Fernández in the 90s. They had three children: Andrea Victoria, Jorge Adolfo, and Sofía María.

In recent years, De Castro married attorney Lisandra Delgado. In the midst of his trial, they were divorced. This caused De Castro Font to be taken to a psychiatric hospital due to the stress of the two legal proceedings against him. He was released a few days after to favor home treatment. Later that year, he attempted suicide. Delgado also claimed that she was victim of stalking by the former senator.

In 2011, as a result of De Castro's legal troubles and incarceration, it was speculated that his ex-wife, Lisandra, could either be charged with him locally for tax evasion, or serve as a witness against her ex-husband.

In 2020, he made news for a minor car accident.
