= Carlos J. Torres Torres =

Puerto Rican politician

Member of the Puerto Rico Senate from the Guayama district
- In office January 2, 2009 – January 1, 2013

Personal details
- Born: January 16, 1967 (age 59) Orocovis, Puerto Rico
- Party: New Progressive Party
- Spouse: Enid M. Torres Alvarado
- Children: 2
- Education: Pontifical Catholic University of Puerto Rico (BBA); Caribbean University (MBA)
- Profession: Politician

Carlos Javier Torres Torres (born January 16, 1967, in Orocovis, Puerto Rico) is a Puerto Rican politician and senator. He has been a member of the Senate of Puerto Rico since 2008.

== Early years and studies ==
Carlos J. Torres Torres was born on January 16, 1967, in Orocovis, Puerto Rico. His parents are Pablo Torres Ramos and Elisa Torres Rodríguez. He has an older sister called Janette.

Torres studied at his hometown of Orocovis, graduating high school from the José Rojas Cortés High School. He finished his bachelor's degree with a major in management from the Pontifical Catholic University of Puerto Rico in Ponce, and his master's degree in administration with a major in human resources from Caribbean University in Vega Baja.

== Political career ==
Since 1996, Torres started working at the Orocovis Municipality for Mayor Jesús "Tito" Colón. He was part of the Municipal Legislative Assembly, becoming the majority speaker. He then served as deputy mayor for ten years.

Torres Torres was elected to the Senate of Puerto Rico for the District of Guayama at the 2008 general elections. He currently presides the Commission of Ethics of the Senate, as well as vice-president of the Commission of Agriculture, among others.

In December 2011, Torres made official his candidacy for a second term on the 2012 general elections. However, he was defeated in the election by the two candidates from the Popular Democratic Party (PPD). Torres arrived third with 23.6% of the votes.

After finishing his term in the Senate, he served as Human Resources Director for the Municipality of Cidra.
