= Alan González Cancel =

Puerto Rican politician

Alan J. González Cancel

Mayor of Utuado
- In office January 14, 2001 – January 13, 2013
- Preceded by: Juan Luis Ortiz Montalvo
- Succeeded by: Ernesto Irizarry Salvá

Personal details
- Born: March 23, 1971 (age 55)
- Party: New Progressive (NPP)
- Spouse: Ivelisse Reyes
- Children: 3

Alan Jesús González Cancel (born March 23, 1971) is a Puerto Rican politician and former mayor of Utuado. González is affiliated with the New Progressive Party (NPP) and served as mayor from 2001 to 2013.

He was born on March 23, 1971, to Jesús Gonzalez and Providencia Cancel. He has two brothers, Manuel and Orvin, and a sister, Lenys. Has three sons with his wife Ivelisse Reyes: Alan Jesús, Alan Emmanuel and Alan Leonel.

He spent his childhood on Barrio Vivi Abajo where his father has a grocery store established (and still open) on 1961. He spent his elementary grades were at the Monserrate Moreno School, his middle grade school was at the Francisco Ramos and his high school was the Luis Muñoz Rivera, where he graduated from in May 1989.
