= José Ramón Díaz =

Puerto Rican politician (born 1973)

José Ramón Díaz Hernández

Member of the Puerto Rico Senate from the Humacao district
- In office January 2, 2008 – January 1, 2013

Personal details
- Born: January 6, 1973 (age 53) Caguas, Puerto Rico
- Party: New Progressive Party
- Children: Kiany Mitchell; Keyla Gabrielle
- Education: Interamerican University of Puerto Rico (BBA)
- Profession: Politician

José Ramón Díaz Hernández (born January 6, 1973) is a Puerto Rican politician and Senator. Díaz has been a member of the Senate of Puerto Rico since 2008.

== Early years and studies ==
José Ramón Díaz Hernández was born on January 6, 1973, in Caguas, Puerto Rico. His parents are José Ramón Díaz and Iris Hernández. Díaz studied at the Manuela Toro High School in Caguas. He received his bachelor's degree in business administration from the Interamerican University of Puerto Rico.

Since his childhood, Díaz has played both baseball and basketball. He played for the Puerto Rican AA League and the American Legion Baseball.

== Political career ==
In 2003, Díaz presented his candidacy for Representative of District 31, which includes Aguas Buenas, Caguas and Gurabo. However, after winning his party primaries, he lost the 2004 general election.

In 2008, Díaz Hernández ran for Senator for the District of Humacao and, again, won his party primaries. At the 2008 general election, Díaz Hernández won after receiving the most votes for any candidate in the district. He currently presides the Commission of Sports and Recreation. He is also vice-president of the Commission of Internal Affairs and Secretary of the Commission of Social Welfare, among others.

== Personal life ==
Díaz Hernández is married and has two daughters: Kiany Mitchell and Keyla Gabrielle.

In September 2011, it was reported that Díaz' wife allegedly found pictures of a naked woman, who happened to be an employee of the Senate, on Díaz cell phone. After making copies of the pictures, she went to the Capitol Building and handed them out to the employees of her husband's office. Díaz admitted knowing the woman, but denied having any pictures of her or any other involvement with her. Meanwhile, the employee was transferred to the office of Senator Lucy Arce, but resigned a few weeks after.

In October 2011, José Báez Neris, presented a complaint against Díaz to the Commission of Ethics of the Senate for the alleged pictures. Báez claimed he was in a relationship with the woman and had a daughter with her.
