= 2012 Puerto Rico Senate election =

The 2012 Puerto Rico Senate election was held on November 6, 2012, to elect the members of the Senate of Puerto Rico for the next four years, from January 2, 2013, until January 1, 2017.

The governing party (the PNP) presented 22 candidates to the Senate, 18 of them incumbents. The main opposing party (the PPD) presented 22 candidates as well, 5 of them incumbents. There were also 36 other candidates from the other minority parties, and one independent candidate.

After the election, the PNP had lost the majority of its seats, winning only 8 seats. The PPD won the majority of seats with 18. One candidate from the Puerto Rican Independence Party also won a minority seat.

== Background ==
After the previous election, the New Progressive Party augmented their majority within the Senate of Puerto Rico with 22 seats versus only 5 seats from the Popular Democratic Party. By virtue of the Minority Law of the Constitution of Puerto Rico, four more senators from the PPD were added to complete a full minority. Also, for the first time in 27 years, the Puerto Rican Independence Party was left without a senator.

During the four years after the 2008 elections, the Senate of Puerto Rico was affected by scandals of corruption and ethics that resulted in the resignation of three members from the PNP delegation (Roberto Arango, Héctor Martínez, Antonio Soto Díaz). Also, one of the members of the PPD delegation (Eder Ortíz Ortíz) resigned to become Electoral Commissioner of the party. All four seats were filled before the elections.

Of the 31 seating senators, 2 were defeated in the primaries held in March for both parties, 2 decided to run for different positions, and 2 decided not to run for reelection. This resulted in 25 incumbent senators running for reelection (19 from the PNP, 6 from the PPD). In addition, 56 new candidates were running for seats for the six different parties, while two ran independent.

== Summary ==
=== Change in composition ===
==== Senate composition before the elections ====
PNP_{1}	PNP_{2}	PNP_{3}	PNP_{4}	PNP_{5}	PNP_{6}	PNP_{7}	PNP_{8}	PNP_{9}
PNP_{10}	PNP_{11}	PNP_{12}	PNP_{13}	PNP_{14}	PNP_{15}	PNP_{16}	PNP_{17}	PNP_{18}
PNP_{19}	PNP_{20}	PNP_{21}	PNP_{22}	PPD_{1}	PPD_{2}	PPD_{3}	PPD_{4}	PPD_{5}
PPD_{6}	PPD_{7}	PPD_{8}	PPD_{9}

==== Senate composition as a result of the elections ====

PPD_{1}	PPD_{2}	PPD_{3}	PPD_{4}	PPD_{5}	PPD_{6}	PPD_{7}	PPD_{8}	PPD_{9}
PPD_{10}	PPD_{11}	PPD_{12}	PPD_{13}	PPD_{14}	PPD_{15}	PPD_{16}	PPD_{17}	PPD_{18}
PNP_{1}	PNP_{2}	PNP_{3}	PNP_{4}	PNP_{5}	PNP_{6}	PNP_{7}	PNP_{8}	PIP_{1}

== Results ==
=== Senators at-large ===
2012 Senators at-large
Party	Candidate	Votes	%	±%
New Progressive Party (PNP)	Thomas Rivera Schatz	154,983	8.66	+0.07
Popular Democratic Party (PPD)	Eduardo Bhatia	149,781	8.37	+1.64
Popular Democratic Party (PPD)	Angel Rosa	139,132	7.78	—
Popular Democratic Party (PPD)	Antonio Fas Alzamora	138,275	7.73	+0.82
Popular Democratic Party (PPD)	Rossana López	136,914	7.65	—
Popular Democratic Party (PPD)	Aníbal José Torres	131,216	7.34	—
New Progressive Party (PNP)	Larry Seilhamer	129,918	7.26	—
New Progressive Party (PNP)	Itzamar Peña Ramírez	127,529	7.13	-0.23
New Progressive Party (PNP)	Margarita Nolasco	127,049	7.10	-0.74
Puerto Rican Independence Party (PIP)	María de Lourdes Santiago	126,635	7.08	+2.23
Popular Democratic Party (PPD)	Cirilo Tirado Rivera	126,489	7.07	+0.35
New Progressive Party (PNP)	Melinda Romero	126,122	7.05	—
New Progressive Party (PNP)	Lucy Arce	123,542	6.91	-1.03
Movimiento Unión Soberanista (MUS)	José "Che" Paraliticci	10,905	0.61	—
Independent	Herminio Pagán Calderín	9,133	0.51	—
Worker's People Party of Puerto Rico (PPT)	Ineabelle Colón	7,878	0.44	—
Puerto Ricans for Puerto Rico Party (PPR)	Carmen M. Sánchez Betancourt	2,987	0.17	—
Total votes		1,788,619	100	

Incumbent at-large senators Kimmey Raschke and José Emilio González (from the PNP) were defeated in the primaries held earlier in the year. Also, senator Alejandro García Padilla was running for Governor for the PPD, while Norma Burgos was running for Mayor of Caguas for the PNP. Senators Sila María González Calderón and Juan Eugenio Hernández Mayoral decided not to run for reelection.

After the election, two at-large incumbents from the PNP (Lucy Arce and Melinda Romero) lost, while the PPD managed to seat all their candidates to senators at-large. Also, María de Lourdes Santiago (from the PIP) regained a seat after losing her seat in the previous election.

Although the PPD won a majority of seats, the candidate with the most votes was the incumbent President of the Senate Thomas Rivera Schatz (from the PNP). PPD candidate Antonio Fas Alzamora won his tenth consecutive term as senator, becoming the longest tenured legislator in the island. On the other hand, candidates Angel Rosa, Rossana López, and Aníbal José Torres (from the PPD) won seats for the first time.

=== District ===
==== I - San Juan ====
District I - San Juan
Party	Candidate	Votes	%	±%
Popular Democratic Party (PPD)	José Nadal Power	98,225	24.69	—
Popular Democratic Party (PPD)	Ramón Luis Nieves	96,378	24.22	—
New Progressive Party (PNP)	Zoé Laboy	90,102	22.64	—
New Progressive Party (PNP)	Liza Fernández	88,633	22.27	—
Puerto Rican Independence Party (PIP)	Héctor J. González Pereira	7,530	1.89	+0.35
Puerto Rican Independence Party (PIP)	Angel Alicea Montañez	6,969	1.75	—
Worker's People Party of Puerto Rico (PPT)	José "Pepe" Córdova	3,646	0.92	—
Movimiento Unión Soberanista (MUS)	Isabel Borrás Marín	3,310	0.83	—
Puerto Ricans for Puerto Rico Party (PPR)	Fred Guillont Juarbe	877	0.22	—
Total votes		397,907	100	

PNP candidate Liza Fernández had been elected to the House of Representatives in the 2008 elections, but had won a special election to fill the vacant left by the resignation of Senator Roberto Arango. Zoé Laboy was running for the first time after serving as Secretary of the Department of Corrections in the 90s. The two candidates of the Popular Democratic Party (PPD), José Nadal Power and Ramón Luis Nieves were also newcomers. After the election, Nadal Power and Nieves won the two district seats that had been in control of the New Progressive Party (PNP) for two consecutive terms.

==== II - Bayamón ====
District II - Bayamón
Party	Candidate	Votes	%	±%
New Progressive Party (PNP)	Migdalia Padilla	106,133	25.73	-2.31
New Progressive Party (PNP)	Carmelo Ríos	106, 125	25.73	-1.90
Popular Democratic Party (PPD)	Miguel Reyes Dávila	90,123	21.85	—
Popular Democratic Party (PPD)	José Orlando Muñoz	89,939	21.80	—
Puerto Rican Independence Party (PIP)	Víctor M. Caraballo	6,494	1.57	—
Puerto Rican Independence Party (PIP)	José A. Ojeda Santos	5,806	1.41	—
Movimiento Unión Soberanista (MUS)	Carlos Alberto Velázquez	2,598	0.63	—
Worker's People Party of Puerto Rico (PPT)	Ruth E. Arroyo Muñoz	2,559	0.62	—
Total votes		412,484	100	

==== III - Arecibo ====
District III - Arecibo
Party	Candidate	Votes	%	±%
New Progressive Party (PNP)	Angel "Chayanne" Martínez	117,857	24.68	-1.53
New Progressive Party (PNP)	José "Joito" Pérez	117,297	24.56	—
Popular Democratic Party (PPD)	Wanda Arroyo	114,871	24.06	—
Popular Democratic Party (PPD)	Rubén Soto	112,674	23.60	—
Puerto Rican Independence Party (PIP)	Jaime Bonel González	5,314	1.11	+0.23
Puerto Rican Independence Party (PIP)	Luis Cruz	5,142	1.08	—
Movimiento Unión Soberanista (MUS)	Rafael Capella Angueira	1,735	0.36	—
Total votes		477,521	100	

==== IV - Mayagüez ====
District IV - Mayagüez
Party	Candidate	Votes	%	±%
Popular Democratic Party (PPD)	María Teresa González	125,353	26.55	—
Popular Democratic Party (PPD)	Gilberto Rodríguez	121,396	25.71	—
New Progressive Party (PNP)	Luis Daniel Muñíz	105,666	22.38	-3.31
New Progressive Party (PNP)	Evelyn Vázquez	103,042	21.82	-3.59
Puerto Rican Independence Party (PIP)	Orlando Ruíz Pesante	5,594	1.18	—
Puerto Rican Independence Party (PIP)	Samuel Soto Bosques	5,483	1.16	-0.57
Movimiento Unión Soberanista (MUS)	Alberto O. Lozada Colón	1,461	0.33	—
Worker's People Party of Puerto Rico (PPT)	Edwin Morales Pérez	1,112	0.24	—
Total votes		472,183	100	

==== V - Ponce ====
District V - Ponce
Party	Candidate	Votes	%	±%
Popular Democratic Party (PPD)	Ramón Ruiz	113,499	24.43	—
Popular Democratic Party (PPD)	Martín Vargas Morales	112,974	24.32	—
New Progressive Party (PNP)	Luis Berdiel	111,806	24.07	-1.44
New Progressive Party (PNP)	Eliezer Velázquez	111,454	23.99	—
Puerto Rican Independence Party (PIP)	Luis Enrique Martínez	6,246	1.34	—
Puerto Rican Independence Party (PIP)	Javier Maldonado Mercado	5,972	1.29	—
Total votes		464,546	100	

==== VI - Guayama ====
District VI - Guayama
Party	Candidate	Votes	%	±%
Popular Democratic Party (PPD)	Miguel Pereira	122,184	25.10	—
Popular Democratic Party (PPD)	Angel M. Rodríguez	120,336	24.72	+1.99
New Progressive Party (PNP)	Carlos Torres Torres	114,916	23.60	-1.59
New Progressive Party (PNP)	Miguel Rodríguez	113,877	23.39	—
Puerto Rican Independence Party (PIP)	Edny Ramírez Pagán	5,287	1.20	—
Puerto Rican Independence Party (PIP)	José Enrique Laboy Gómez	5,758	1.18	—
Movimiento Unión Soberanista (MUS)	Roberto Colón Ocasio	1,127	0.23	—
Independent	Benjamín "Bengie" León	200	0.04	—
Total votes		486,845	100	

==== VII - Humacao ====
District VII - Humacao
Party	Candidate	Votes	%	±%
Popular Democratic Party (PPD)	José Luis Dalmau	117,610	26.37	+2.65
Popular Democratic Party (PPD)	Jorge Suárez	114,165	25.60	+2.88
New Progressive Party (PNP)	José Ramón Díaz	98,361	22.06	-2.02
New Progressive Party (PNP)	Luz M. Santiago	97,800	21.93	-2.14
Puerto Rican Independence Party (PIP)	Maritza Algarín Sepúlveda	5,552	1.24	—
Puerto Rican Independence Party (PIP)	Juan "Cholo" Lebrón	5,081	1.14	+0.18
Movimiento Unión Soberanista (MUS)	Vilma Calderón Jiménez	2,417	0.54	—
Worker's People Party of Puerto Rico (PPT)	Carlos R. Mercado Cotto	1,378	0.31	—
Puerto Ricans for Puerto Rico Party (PPR)	José Luis "Tito" Dones	797	0.18	—
Total votes		445,970	100	

==== VIII - Carolina ====
District VIII - Carolina
Party	Candidate	Votes	%	±%
Popular Democratic Party (PPD)	Pedro A. Rodríguez	101,391	25.53	—
Popular Democratic Party (PPD)	Luis Daniel Rivera	100,080	25.20	—
New Progressive Party (PNP)	Lornna Soto	91,216	22.97	-1.88
New Progressive Party (PNP)	Roger Iglesias	86,584	21.80	-1.10
Puerto Rican Independence Party (PIP)	Pedro José "Pepe" Alvarez	5,378	1.35	-1.75
Puerto Rican Independence Party (PIP)	Dwight Rodríguez Orta	5,302	1.34	+0.36
Movimiento Unión Soberanista (MUS)	Guillermo Sosa Rodríguez	2,217	0.56	—
Puerto Ricans for Puerto Rico Party (PPR)	Fabiola Carrasquillo	1,309	0.33	-1.46
Puerto Ricans for Puerto Rico Party (PPR)	Edwin M. González	1,134	0.29	—
Total votes		397,097	100	

== See also ==
- Puerto Rican general election, 2008
- Puerto Rican general election, 2012
