= 24th Senate of Puerto Rico =

Upper house of the 16th Legislative Assembly of Puerto Rico

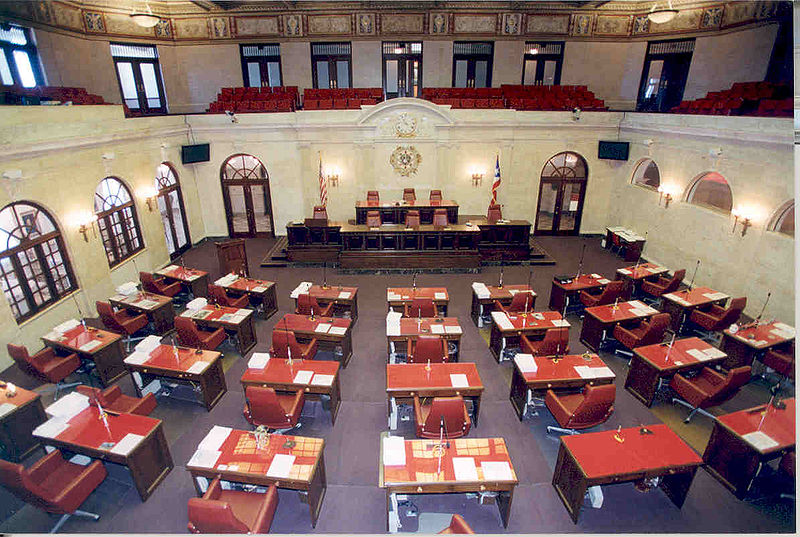

In session
- January 2, 2009 – January 1, 2013

Leadership
- President: Thomas Rivera Schatz
- President pro tem: Margarita Nolasco
- Majority Leader: Larry Seilhamer
- Majority Whip: Lucy Arce
- Minority Leader: José Luis Dalmau
- Minority Whip: Eduardo Bhatia

Non-officers
- Secretary: Brunilda Ortíz
- Sergeant-at-Arms: Billy Sánchez

Structure
- Seats: 31 voting members
- Parties represented: PNP; PPD
- Length of term: 4 years

Legislature
- 16th Legislative Assembly of Puerto Rico

Lower house
- 28th House of Representatives of Puerto Rico

Sessions
- 1st: January 14, 2009 – January 12, 2010
- 2nd: January 13, 2010 – January 11, 2011
- 3rd: January 12, 2011 – January 10, 2012
- 4th: January 11, 2012 – January 1, 2013

The 24th Senate of Puerto Rico was the upper house of the 16th Legislative Assembly of Puerto Rico that met from January 2, 2009, to January 1, 2013. All members were elected in the General Elections of 2008. The Senate had a majority of members from the New Progressive Party (PNP).

The body is counterparted by the 28th House of Representatives of Puerto Rico in the lower house.

== Leadership ==
| Position | Name | Party | District |
|---|---|---|---|
| President of the Senate | Thomas Rivera Schatz | PNP | At-Large |
| President pro Tempore | Margarita Nolasco Santiago | PNP | At-Large |
| Majority Leader | Larry Seilhamer Rodríguez | PNP | V |
| Majority Whip | Luz Arce Ferrer | PNP | At-large |
| Minority Leader | José Luis Dalmau | PPD | At-Large |
| Minority Whip | Eduardo Bhatia | PPD | At-Large |

== Members ==
=== Summary ===
| Affiliation | Party (Shading indicates majority caucus) | | | Total | |
| Affiliation | PNP | PPD | Ind | Total | Vacant |
|---|---|---|---|---|---|
| End of previous legislature | 17 | 9 | 1 | 27 | 0 |
| Begin | 22 | 8 | 0 | 31 | 0 |
| January 28, 2012 | 20 | 8 | 0 | 28 | 3 |
| Latest voting share | 72.4% | 27.6% | | | |

=== Membership ===
| District | Name | Party |
|---|---|---|
| I - San Juan | Liza Fernández Rodríguez | PNP |
| I - San Juan | Kimmey Raschke Martínez | PNP |
| II - Bayamón | Migdalia Padilla Alvelo | PNP |
| II - Bayamón | Carmelo Ríos Santiago | PNP |
| III - Arecibo | José Emilio González Velázquez | PNP |
| III - Arecibo | Angel Martínez Santiago | PNP |
| IV - Mayagüez-Aguadilla | Luis Daniel Muñiz Cortes | PNP |
| IV - Mayagüez-Aguadilla | Evelyn Vázquez Nieves | PNP |
| V - Ponce | Luis A. Berdiel Rivera | PNP |
| V - Ponce | Larry Seilhamer Rodriguez | PNP |
| VI - Guayama | Miguel Rodríguez | PNP |
| VI - Guayama | Carlos J. Torres Torres | PNP |
| VII - Humacao | José R. Díaz Hernández | PNP |
| VII - Humacao | Luz M. Santiago Gonzalez | PNP |
| VIII - Carolina | Roger Iglesias | PNP |
| VIII - Carolina | Lornna Soto Villanueva | PNP |
| At-Large | Luz Arce Ferrer | PNP |
| At-Large | Eduardo Bhatia | PPD |
| At-Large | Norma Burgos | PNP |
| At-Large | José Luis Dalmau | PPD |
| At-Large | Antonio Fas Alzamora | PPD |
| At-Large | Alejandro García Padilla | PPD |
| At-Large | Sila María González Calderón | PPD |
| At-Large | Juan Eugenio Hernández Mayoral | PPD |
| At-Large | Margarita Nolasco Santiago | PNP |
| At-Large | Angel Rodríguez Otero | PPD |
| At-Large | Itzamar Peña Ramírez | PNP |
| At-Large | Thomas Rivera Schatz | PNP |
| At-Large | Melinda Romero Donnelly | PNP |
| At-Large | Cirilo Tirado Rivera | PPD |
| At-Large | Jorge Suárez Cáceres | PPD |

| Party | At-large | | | District | | | Total seats |
| Party | Votes | % | Seats | Votes | % | Seats | Total seats |
|---|---|---|---|---|---|---|---|
| New Progressive Party | 886,196 | 48.12 | 6 | 1,887,968 | 51.20 | 16 | 22 |
| Popular Democratic Party | 803,415 | 43.63 | 9 | 1,632,545 | 44.28 | 0 | 9 |
| Puerto Rican Independence Party | 90,171 | 4.90 | 0 | 80,920 | 2.19 | 0 | 0 |
| Puerto Ricans for Puerto Rico Party | 38,103 | 2.07 | 0 | 84,437 | 2.29 | 0 | 0 |
| Other parties | 412 | 0.02 | 0 | 1,224 | 0.03 | 0 | 0 |
| Independents | 23,158 | 1.26 | 0 | | | | 0 |
| Total | 1,841,455 | 100.00 | 15 | 3,687,094 | 100.00 | 16 | 31 |
| Valid votes | 1,841,455 | 98.95 | | | | | |
| Invalid votes | 8,428 | 0.45 | | | | | |
| Blank votes | 11,055 | 0.59 | | | | | |
| Total votes | 1,860,938 | 100.00 | | | | | |
| Registered voters/turnout | 2,458,036 | 75.71 | | | | | |
Source: Puerto Rico Election Archive
