= 25th Senate of Puerto Rico =

Session of the Puerto Rico Legislature

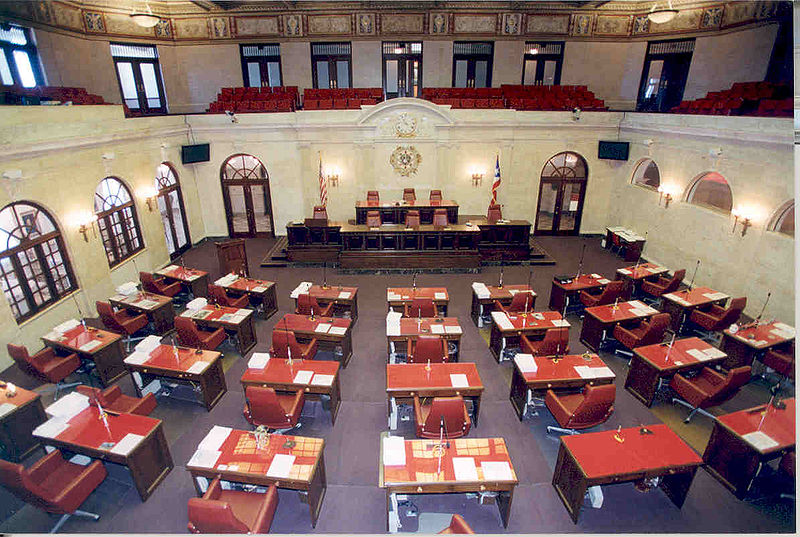

In session
- January 2, 2013 – January 1, 2017

Leadership
- President: Eduardo Bhatia
- President pro tem: José Luis Dalmau
- Majority Leader: Aníbal José Torres
- Majority Whip: Rossana López
- Minority Leaders: Larry Seilhamer; María de Lourdes Santiago
- Minority Whip: Carmelo Ríos

Non-officers
- Secretary: Tania Barbarossa
- Sergeant-at-Arms: Luis A. Ramos Rivera

Structure
- Seats: 27 voting members
- Parties represented: 18 PPD; 8 PNP; 1 PIP
- Length of term: 4 years

Elections
- Last election: November 6, 2012
- Next election: November 8, 2016

Legislature
- 17th Legislative Assembly of Puerto Rico

Lower house
- 29th House of Representatives of Puerto Rico

Sessions
- 1st: January 14, 2013 – June 30, 2013
- 2nd: August 19, 2013 – November 19, 2013
- 3rd: January 13, 2014 – June 30, 2014
- 4th: August 18, 2014 – November 18, 2014
- 5th: January 12, 2015 – June 30, 2015
- 6th: August 17, 2015 – November 17, 2015
- 7th: January 11, 2016 – June 30, 2016
- 8th: August 15, 2016 – November 15, 2016

The 25th Senate of Puerto Rico is the upper house of the 17th Legislative Assembly of Puerto Rico and convened from January 2, 2013, to January 1, 2017. All members were elected in the General Elections of 2012. The Senate has a majority of members from the Popular Democratic Party (PPD). The body is counterparted by the 29th House of Representatives of Puerto Rico in the lower house.

== Leadership ==
PPD PNP PIP
Office	Senator	District	Party
President	Eduardo Bhatia	At-large	PPD
President pro tempore	José Luis Dalmau	District VII Humacao	PPD
Majority Leader	Aníbal José Torres	At-large	PPD
Majority Whip	Rossana López León	At-large	PPD
Minority Leader	Larry Seilhamer Rodríguez	At-large	PNP
Minority Whip	Carmelo Ríos	District II Bayamón	PNP
Minority Leader	Maria de Lourdes Santiago	At-large	PIP

== Members ==
PPD PNP PIP
District	Name	Political party
At-large	Angel Rosa	PPD
At-large	Aníbal José Torres	PPD
At-large	Antonio Fas Alzamora	PPD
At-large	Cirilo Tirado	PPD
At-large	Eduardo Bhatia	PPD
At-large	Rossana López León	PPD
District I San Juan	José Nadal Power	PPD
District I San Juan	Ramón Luis Nieves	PPD
District IV Mayagüez–Aguadilla	Gilberto Rodríguez	PPD
District IV Mayagüez–Aguadilla	María Teresa González	PPD
District V Ponce	Martín Vargas Morales	PPD
District V Ponce	Ramón Ruiz	PPD
District VI Guayama	Ángel M. Rodríguez Otero	PPD
District VI Guayama	Miguel A. Pereira	PPD
District VII Humacao	Jorge Suárez	PPD
District VII Humacao	José Luis Dalmau	PPD
District VIII Carolina	Luis Daniel Rivera	PPD
District VIII Carolina	Pedro A. Rodríguez	PPD
At-large	Itzamar Peña	PNP
At-large	Larry Seilhamer Rodríguez	PNP
At-large	Margarita Nolasco	PNP
At-large	Thomas Rivera Schatz	PNP
District II Bayamón	Carmelo Ríos	PNP
District II Bayamón	Migdalia Padilla	PNP
District III Arecibo	Ángel Martínez Santiago	PNP
District III Arecibo	José Joito Pérez	PNP
At-large	Maria de Lourdes Santiago	PIP

== Non-officers ==
PPD
Post	Name	Political party
Secretary	Tania Barbarossa	PPD
Serjeant-at-Arms	Luis A. Ramos Rivera (Note: Senate (2013) "Sometida a votación la elección del Sargento de Armas, la misma es aprobada y el señor Presidente, proclama al señor Luis A. Ramos Rivera, como Sargento de Armas del Senado del Estado Libre Asociado de Puerto Rico.")	PPD
