= 2012 Popular Democratic Party of Puerto Rico primaries =

Popular Democratic Party primaries, 2012
- March 18, 2012
Previous PPD Governor candidate
Alejandro García Padilla
PPD Governor candidate-elect
Alejandro García Padilla

The 2012 Popular Democratic Party primaries were the primary elections by which voters of the Popular Democratic Party (PPD) chose its nominees for various political offices of Puerto Rico for the 2012 general elections. They were held on March 18, 2012, and coincided with the Republican Party primaries in the island.

== Background ==
At the time of the primaries, the Popular Democratic Party had already chosen current Senator Alejandro García Padilla, as their gubernatorial candidate. He would be joined in the ballot by Rafael Cox Alomar as candidate for Resident Commissioner of Puerto Rico.

In the Senate, there were 5 sitting senators looking to retain their election spots. In the House, there were around 5 sitting representatives as well. Also, some returning candidates from previous years, like Roberto Vigoreaux, and other former officeholders, like Miguel Pereira and Aníbal José Torres, were entering the political race. Some relatives of known politicians also made the jump to politics. Eduardo Ferrer, brother of Héctor Ferrer, was aspiring for a Senate spot, while Javier Aponte Dalmau, brother of current mayor of Carolina, José Aponte Dalmau, both sons of former mayor José Aponte de la Torre, was running for a spot as representative for District 38.

Francisco Zayas Seijo, who was mayor of Ponce, was also attempting a return to politics after his defeat in 2008. He was running for the mayoral candidacy again, this time against Ramón Torres. The only sitting mayor from the PPD that was challenged in a primary was Edgardo Arlequín, from Guayanilla.

Also, the amount of primaries per municipality and districts were few, when compared to previous years. As a result, the primaries were expected to be of low participation among the party members.

== Candidates ==
=== Mayors ===
The Popular Democratic Party held primaries in 20 of 78 municipalities.

==== Aibonito ====
- Leonardo González
- Lisandro Quiles
- Dennis Nuñez

==== Arecibo ====
- René González
- Gilberto Legarreta
- Jesús "Manía" López
- Raquel Ortíz Roldán

==== Arroyo ====
- Eric Bachier Román
- Roberto Cora

==== Camuy ====
- Ricardo García
- Víctor Román Vélez

==== Cidra ====
- Roberto Colón
- Georgie Maldonado
- Rudy Santos

==== Culebra ====
- Alexis Bermúdez
- Iván Solís

==== Fajardo ====
- Michael Avilés
- Reginald Neptune Torres

==== Guayama ====
- Eduardo Cintrón
- Samuel Ruíz

==== Guayanilla ====
- Edgardo Arlequín
- Juan "Tonito" Torres

==== Luquillo ====
- Jesús "Jerry" Marquéz
- María "Yini" Santiago

==== Moca ====
- Héctor "Mol" Ibañez
- Domingo "Isín" Méndez
- Samuel Pellot

==== Morovis ====
- Miguel "Mickey" Ríos
- Roxana "Ivy" Sánchez

==== Naguabo ====
- Wilfredo Astacio
- Aguedo Rivera Ríos
- José Obel Rosario

==== Patillas ====
- José "Cheo" Pabón
- Norberto Soto Figueroa

==== Ponce ====
- Ramón Torres Morales
- Francisco Zayas Seijo

==== San Sebastián ====
- Reinaldo Ramos
- Angel Salas Pérez

==== Santa Isabel ====
- Jaime Muñoz
- Justo Torres

==== Toa Alta ====
- Clemente Agosto
- José "Tito" Rolón

==== Utuado ====
- Ernesto Irizarry Salvá
- Rafael Juarbe Pagán

==== Vieques ====
- Víctor Emeric
- José Cedrid Morales
- Dámaso Serrano

== Results ==
=== Senate ===
==== At-large ====
Candidate	Popular vote	Percentage
Eduardo Bhatia	243,608	17.12%
Aníbal José Torres	228,911	16.08
Rossana López León	225,145	15.82
Angel Rosa	220,652	15.50
Cirilo Tirado	211,726	14.88
Antonio Fas Alzamora	155,715	10.94
Luis Ricardo Santini	133,994	9.41
Others	3,482	0.24

==== District ====
===== San Juan =====
Candidate	Popular vote	Percentage
José Nadal Power	17,463	34.13%
Ramón Luis Nieves	9,872	19.30
Claribel Martínez	6,581	12.86
Angel Noel Rivera	6,485	12.68
Bethzaida Falcón	4,368	8.54
José M. Delgado	3,375	6.60
Raúl Valcárcel	2,463	4.81
Others	552	1.08

===== Arecibo =====
Candidate	Popular vote	Percentage
Wanda Arroyo	16,931	26.61%
Rubén Soto	11,595	18.22
Iván Serrano	10,900	17.13
Frankie Hernández	9,864	15.50
Rafael Rodríguez	9,562	15.03
Francisca Rivera	3,707	5.83
Others	1,064	1.67

===== Mayagüez-Aguadilla =====
Candidate	Popular vote	Percentage
María Teresa González	29,539	40.99%
Gilberto Rodríguez	16,446	22.82
Sergio Ortíz Quiñones	15,524	21.54
Heriberto Acevedo	9,890	13.72
Others	665	0.92

===== Ponce =====
Candidate	Popular vote	Percentage
Martín Vargas	19,640	24.69%
Ramoncito Ruiz	19,154	24.08
Jackeline Rosado	16,331	20.53
Rafael Santiago	9,971	12.53
José G. Izquierdo	7,426	9.33
Radamés Pérez	5,527	6.95
Others	1,507	1.89

===== Guayama =====
Candidate	Popular vote	Percentage
Miguel Pereira	23,892	33.28%
Angel M. Rodríguez	16,154	22.50
Luis Guillermo Febus	14,486	20.18
Zulma González	12,741	17.75
Carlos Colón	3,653	5.09
Others	862	1.20

===== Humacao =====
Candidate	Popular vote	Percentage
José Luis Dalmau	26,406	45.75%
Jorge Suárez Cáceres	21,303	36.91
Norberto Andújar Iglesias	9,757	16.90
Others	255	0.44

===== Carolina =====
Candidate	Popular vote	Percentage
Pedro A. Rodríguez	18,446	35.90%
Luis Daniel Rivera	14,745	28.69
Samuel Cepeda	13,248	25.78
Gabriel Pérez	4,370	8.50
Others	579	1.13

=== House of Representatives ===
==== At-large ====
Candidate	Popular vote	Percentage
Carmen Yulín Cruz	219,212	15.13%
Luis Vega Ramos	219,040	15.12
Jaime Perelló	214,796	14.82
Brenda López	169,686	11.71
Charlie Hernández	167,203	11.54
Jorge Colberg Toro	160,187	11.05
Eduardo Ferrer	146,657	10.12
Roberto Vigoreaux	82,027	5.66
Yaramary Torres	64,377	4.44
Others	5,925	0.41

==== District ====
===== District 1 =====
Candidate	Popular vote	Percentage
Ronald Ramos	2,115	49.43%
Carlos Vélez	2,017	47.14
Others	147	3.44

===== District 3 =====
Candidate	Popular vote	Percentage
Sonia Pacheco	2,551	48.79%
Rafael Hernández	2,070	39.59
Cristofer Malespin	546	10.44
Others	61	1.17

===== District 4 =====
Candidate	Popular vote	Percentage
José Luis Báez	5,285	89.09%
José "Pocho" Marrero	501	8.45
Others	146	2.46

===== District 9 =====
Candidate	Popular vote	Percentage
Wraygabriel de Jesús	2,461	42.43%
Roberto Ocaña	2,056	35.45
Javier de Jesús	1,157	19.95
Others	126	2.17

===== District 10 =====
Candidate	Popular vote	Percentage
Juan Costales	1,957	58.49%
Noel Herrera	1,343	40.14
Others	46	1.37

===== District 12 =====
Candidate	Popular vote	Percentage
Edgardo Feliciano	3,429	45.19%
Luis "Wiso" Rivas	2,613	34.44
Miguel Angel Torres	1,362	17.95
Others	184	2.42

===== District 13 =====
Candidate	Popular vote	Percentage
Hiram Aguila	3,073	52.69%
Ferdinand Rolón	1,749	29.99
Félix Pagán Vega	834	14.30
Others	176	3.02

===== District 14 =====
Candidate	Popular vote	Percentage
Esther Vélez	4,879	64.64%
Benjamín Pérez	2,475	32.79
Others	194	2.57

===== District 15 =====
Candidate	Popular vote	Percentage
César Hernández	4,068	53.45%
José "Tato" Ruíz	3,485	45.79
Others	58	0.76

===== District 16 =====
Candidate	Popular vote	Percentage
José Rodríguez	4,705	43.42%
José Enrique Méndez	4,105	37.88
Eladio Cardona	1,852	17.09
Others	174	1.61

===== District 18 =====
Candidate	Popular vote	Percentage
Francisco Nieves	2,927	36.91%
José "Pote" Vargas	2,796	35.25
María Vargas	2,077	26.19
Others	131	1.65

===== District 19 =====
Candidate	Popular vote	Percentage
Efraín de Jesús	2,985	42.81%
Teodoro Solá	1,537	22.04
Alex Vargas	1,310	18.79
Luis Negrón	517	7.41
Gil Mercado	348	4.99
Others	276	3.96

===== District 20 =====
Candidate	Popular vote	Percentage
Carlos Bianchi	3,798	48.91%
Ramón Torres	3,092	39.82
Osvaldo Ortíz	706	9.09
Others	169	2.18

===== District 22 =====
Candidate	Popular vote	Percentage
Gabriel Rodríguez	4,175	40.38%
Gregorio Rivera	3,469	33.55
Jorge Rivera	2,401	23.22
Others	295	2.85

===== District 23 =====
Candidate	Popular vote	Percentage
Nelson Torres Yordán	4,040	40.64%
Edward Pacheco	2,380	23.94
José "Cheito" Rivera	1,925	19.36
Bienvenido Ramos	1,267	12.74
Others	330	3.32

===== District 24 =====
Candidate	Popular vote	Percentage
Adrian Graham	4,448	52.48%
Evangelina Rivera	3,820	45.07
Others	207	2.44

===== District 27 =====
Candidate	Popular vote	Percentage
José "Pito" Torres	6,547	66.60%
Guillermo Avilés	3,123	31.77
Others	160	1.63

===== District 29 =====
Candidate	Popular vote	Percentage
Carlos Vargas	2,904	42.12%
Alfredo Lamboy	2,098	30.43
Joel Alicea	1,674	24.28
Others	219	3.18

===== District 30 =====
Candidate	Popular vote	Percentage
Luis R. Ortíz	4,409	49.74%
Edgar González	3,153	35.57
Angel Sanabria	1,050	11.85
Others	252	2.84

===== District 31 =====
Candidate	Popular vote	Percentage
Jesús Santa	3,254	54.15%
Rubén Ríos	2,364	39.34
Miguel Suárez	292	4.86
Others	99	1.65

===== District 32 =====
Candidate	Popular vote	Percentage
"Conny" Varela	4,081	61.85%
Miguel Otero	1,699	25.75
Alexander Torres	628	9.52
Others	190	2.88

===== District 35 =====
Candidate	Popular vote	Percentage
Narden Jaime Espinosa	4,917	61.36%
Elvin Monge	2,979	37.17
Others	118	1.47

===== District 36 =====
Candidate	Popular vote	Percentage
Glenn Rivera	4,238	61.71%
Norma Guzmán	2,382	34.68
Others	248	3.61

===== District 38 =====
Candidate	Popular vote	Percentage
Javier Aponte	2,314	33.44%
Daniel Resto	1,352	19.54
Benjamín Cortés	949	13.71
Hiram Rivera	811	11.72
Luis David Rodríguez	693	10.01
Víctor Rodríguez	465	6.72
Richard Timm Ríos	100	1.45
Others	236	3.41

== See also ==
- New Progressive Party primaries, 2012
