= 16th Legislative Assembly of Puerto Rico =

Session of the Puerto Rico Legislature

The 16th Legislative Assembly of Puerto Rico will meet from January 2, 2009, to January 1, 2013. All members of the House of Representatives and the Senate were elected in the General Elections of 2008. The House and the Senate both have a majority of members from the New Progressive Party.

== Leadership ==
=== Senate ===
Office	Senator	Party	District
President	Thomas Rivera Schatz	PNP	At-Large
Vice President	Margarita Nolasco	PNP	At-Large
Majority Leader	Roberto Arango (2009-2011)	PNP	District I
Majority Leader	Larry Seilhamer (2011–present)	PNP	District V
Minority Leader	Jose Luis Dalmau	PPD	District VII

=== House of Representatives ===
Office	Representative	Party	District
Speaker of the House	Jennifer Gonzalez	PNP	At-Large
Speaker Pro Tem	Gabriel Rodriguez Aguilo	PNP	District 13
Majority Leader	Rolando Crespo (2008-2011)	PNP	At-large
Majority Leader	Johnny Méndez (2011–present)	PNP	District 36
Minority Leader	Hector Ferrer	PPD	At-Large

== Changes in membership ==
=== Senate ===
District	Former senator	Reason for change	Successor	Date of successor's installation
VIII - Carolina	Héctor Martínez	Resigned March 12, 2011 after being found guilty for corruption.	Roger Iglesias	June 25, 2011
I - San Juan	Roberto Arango	Resigned August 28, 2011 after personal scandal.	Liza Fernández	May 10, 2012
VI - Guayama	Antonio Soto Díaz	Resigned September 14, 2011 due to investigation on his campaign finances.	Miguel A. Rodríguez	May 10, 2012
At-large	Eder Ortíz	Resigned December 31, 2011 to become PPD Electoral Commissioner.	Angel Rodríguez Otero	August 24, 2012

=== House of Representatives ===
District	Former senator	Reason for change	Successor	Date of successor's installation
At-large	Iris Miriam Ruíz	Resigned on March 1, 2010 after being appointed Ombudswoman.	José Torres Zamora	June 2, 2010
16	Iván Rodríguez Traverzo	Expelled on December 10, 2010 after accusations of bribery.	Eric Alfaro	April 11, 2011
At-large	Luis Farinacci	Resigned January 19, 2011 after allegations of domestic violence.	Pedro A. Rodríguez	March 3, 2011
At-large	Rolando Crespo	Resigned February 27, 2011 after positive drug test.	José Enrique Meléndez	May 23, 2011
At-large	Héctor Ferrer	Resigned March 15, 2012 after allegations of domestic abuse.	Eduardo Ferrer	May 24, 2012
4	Liza Fernández	Resigned to fill vacant seat in the Senate of Puerto Rico.	Víctor Parés	May 24, 2012

== See also ==
- List of Legislative Assemblies of Puerto Rico
