= Senator Rodriguez =

Senator Rodriguez or Rodríguez may refer to:

- Ana Maria Rodriguez (politician) (born 1977), Florida State Senate
- Celestino Rodriguez (1872–1955), Senate of the Philippines
- Eugene Rodriguez (politician) (born 1929), New York State Senate
- Eulogio Rodriguez (1883–1964), Senate of the Philippines
- Justo A. Méndez Rodriguez (1917–1995), Senate of Puerto Rico
- Nancy Rodriguez (politician) (born 1953), New Mexico State Senate
- Robert Rodriguez (politician), Colorado State Senate
- Charlie Rodríguez (born 1954), Senate of Puerto Rico
- Gilberto Rodríguez (born 1975), Senate of Puerto Rico
- José R. Rodríguez (born 1948), Texas State Senate
- Larry Seilhamer Rodríguez (born 1954), Senate of Puerto Rico
- Maribel Rodríguez (fl. 2000s), Senate of Puerto Rico
- Pedro A. Rodríguez (born 1968), Senate of Puerto Rico
- Pedro Rodríguez y Lazala (1869–1932), Senate of the Philippines

== See also ==
- Michael Rodrigues (politician) (born 1959), Massachusetts State Senate
