= 2012 Puerto Rican general election =

- November 6, 2012
- Gubernatorial election
- Turnout: 78.11%
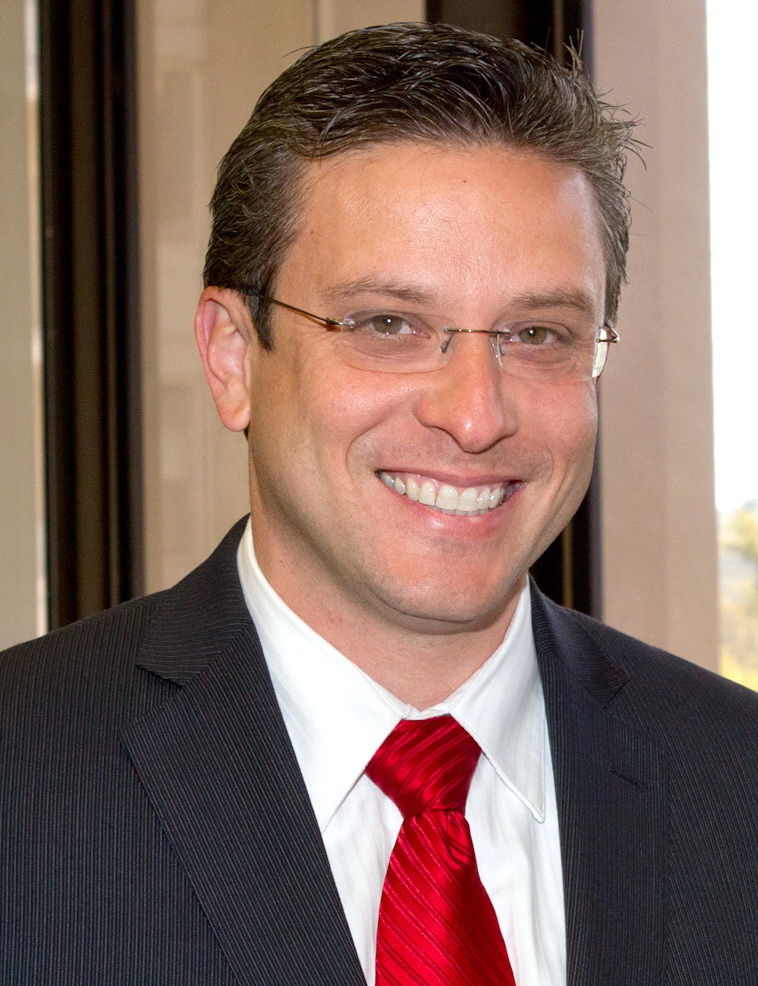

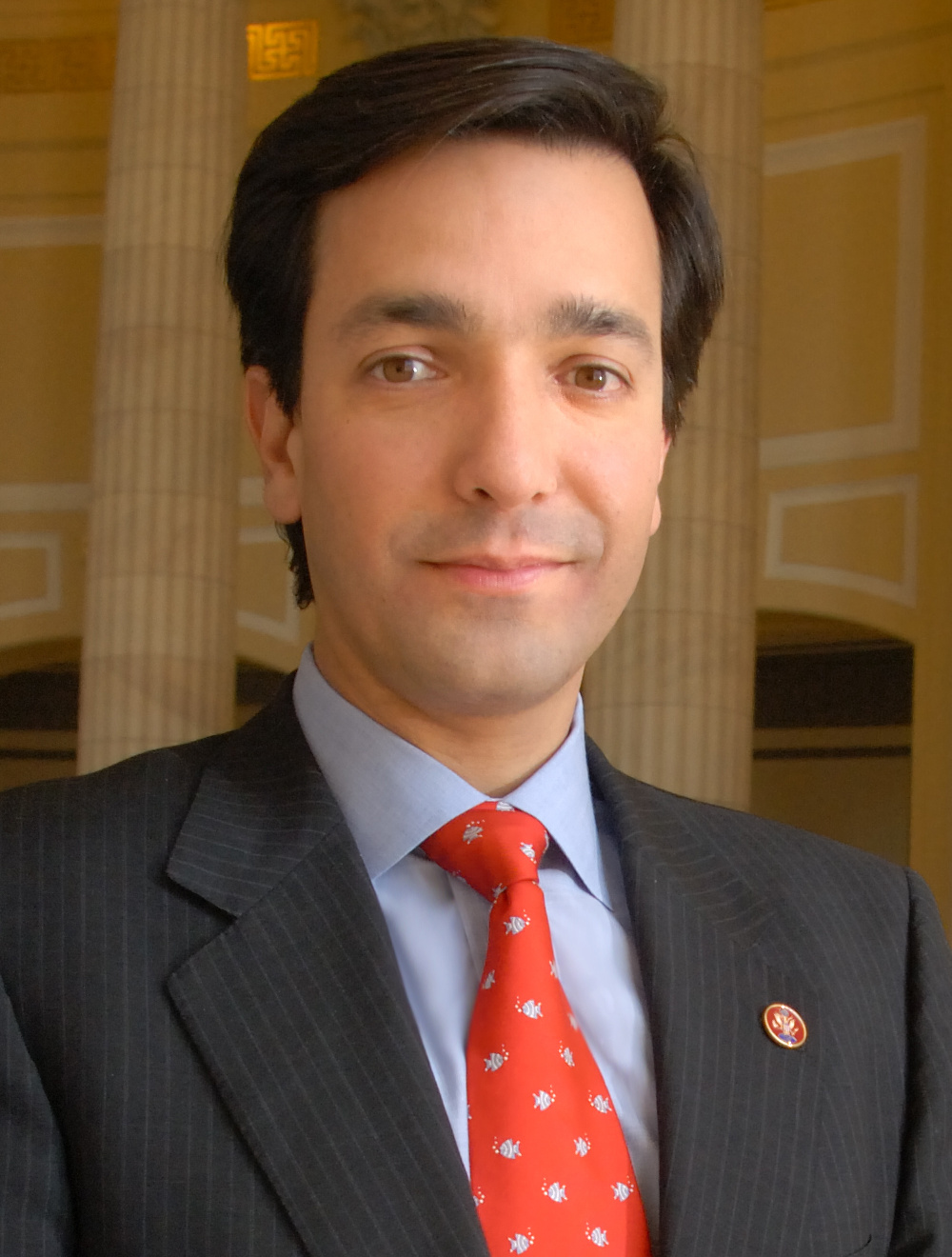
Candidate	Alejandro García Padilla	Luis Fortuño
Party	Popular Democratic	New Progressive
Popular vote	896,060	884,775
Percentage	48.04%	47.44%
- Results by municipality Padilla: 40–50% 50–60% Fortuño: 40–50% 50–60%
Governor before election
Luis Fortuño
New Progressive
Elected Governor
Alejandro García Padilla
Popular Democratic
- Resident Commissioner election
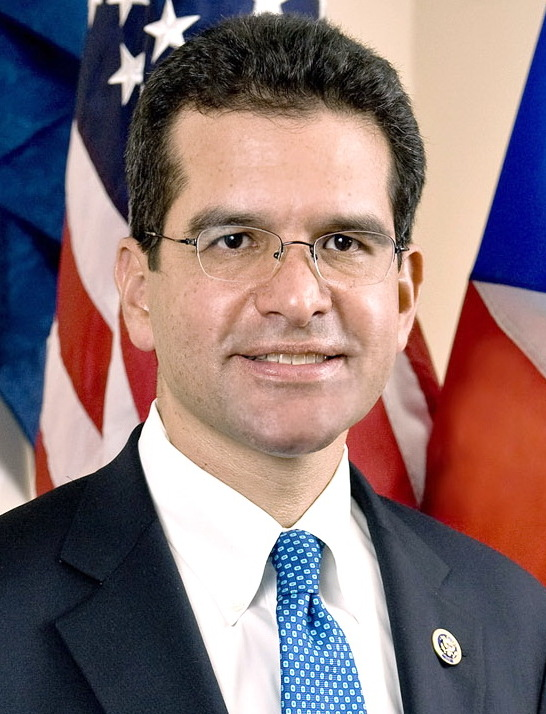

Candidate	Pedro Pierluisi	Rafael Cox Alomar
Party	New Progressive	Popular Democratic
Alliance	Democratic	Democratic
Popular vote	905,066	881,181
Percentage	48.76%	47.47%
- Results by municipality Cox: 40–50% 50–60% Pierluisi: 40–50% 50–60%
Resident Commissioner before election
Pedro Pierluisi
New Progressive
Elected Resident Commissioner
Pedro Pierluisi
New Progressive

General elections were held in Puerto Rico on Tuesday, November 6, 2012, to elect the officials of the Puerto Rican government that would serve for the next four years, including the governor, resident commissioner and members of the Legislative Assembly. A status referendum was held on the same date.

The gubernatorial elections were won by then-Senator Alejandro García Padilla from the Popular Democratic Party (PPD), who defeated incumbent governor Luis Fortuño from the New Progressive Party (PNP) in a close election. This election marked the second time in more than 40 years that six parties participated in the election, the first time in more than 60 years that a status referendum was held on the same day as the general election, and the first time in Puerto Rico that absentee ballots were issued for those who were out of the country on the day of the election. As of 2026, this was the most recent time a member of the Popular Democratic Party won the governorship of Puerto Rico.

In the elections for Resident Commissioner, incumbent Pedro Pierluisi of the PNP (who caucused with the Democratic Party and who was first elected in 2008, narrowly won reelection for a second term. Pierluisi defeated his closest opponent, Rafael Cox Alomar of the PPD by almost 1.3%.

== Candidates ==
Before the election year, the constitution of Puerto Rico provides for any qualified person to present their candidacy for a specific position. If two or more candidates from the same party present their candidacy for the same position, and they can't reach an agreement within the party, a primary election is held. This election is held within the inscribed members of each party, to select which of the candidates will represent the party in the general election.

Both of the main parties, the PNP and PPD, held primaries for several positions on March 18, 2012.

=== New Progressive Party (PNP) ===
The primaries were held on March 18, 2012, to determine several candidates for the Senate, House of Representatives, and others.

=== Popular Democratic Party (PPD) ===
The primaries were held on March 18, 2012, to determine several candidates for the Senate, House of Representatives, and others.

=== New Progressive Party ===
Incumbent Governor of Puerto Rico, Luis Fortuño, announced his candidacy for reelection in October 2011. Former Secretary of Health, Iván González Cancel, challenged him to a primary, but the court ruled it out.

=== Popular Democratic Party ===
Current senator Alejandro García Padilla, announced his candidacy in March 2011.

=== Puerto Rican Independence Party ===
Former Electoral Commissioner Juan Dalmau Ramírez, announced his candidacy for the Puerto Rican Independence Party. In January 2012, he presented his campaign staff and government program.

=== Puerto Ricans for Puerto Rico ===
Rogelio Figueroa was the candidate for governor for the PPR party.

=== Movimiento Unión Soberanista ===
The MUS had chosen Dr. Enrique Vázquez Quintana as candidate for governor. However, in August 2012, Vázquez Quintana withdrew from the candidacy. A week later, he was replaced by Attorney Arturo Hernández, who was formerly president of the Puerto Rico Bar Association. Hernández was already a candidate for the Senate of Puerto Rico.

=== Working People's Party ===
Professor Rafael Bernabe was announced as the gubernatorial candidate for the PPT in June 2012.

=== Resident Commissioner ===
The incumbent Resident Commissioner of Puerto Rico Pedro Pierluisi, from the PNP, faced the following candidates for the position:

- Rafael Cox Alomar, Popular Democratic Party (PPD)
- Juan Mercado Nieves, Puerto Rican Independence Party (PIP)
- Sadiasept Guillont Juarbe, Puerto Ricans for Puerto Rico Party (PPR)
- María de Lourdes Guzmán, Movimiento Union Soberanista (MUS)
- Félix Córdova Iturregui, Working People's Party (PPT)

=== Senate ===
==== At-large ====
The ballot featured seventeen (17) candidates from six different parties and one independent candidate (bold denotes incumbent candidates)

**New Progressive Party (PNP)**

- **Lucy Arce**
- **Margarita Nolasco**
- **Itzamar Peña**
- **Thomas Rivera Schatz**
- **Melinda Romero**
- **Larry Seilhamer**

**Popular Democratic Party (PPD)**

- **Eduardo Bhatia**
- **Antonio Fas Alzamora**
- Rossana López León
- Angel Rosa
- **Cirilo Tirado Rivera**
- Aníbal José Torres

**Other parties**

- María de Lourdes Santiago (PIP)
- Carmen M. Sánchez Betancourt (PPR)
- José "Che" Paraliticci (MUS)
- Ineabelle Colón (PPT)
- Herminio Pagán Calderín (independent)

==== District ====
**San Juan**

- Angel "Luigi" Alicea (PIP)
- Isabel Borras Marín (MUS)
- José "Pepe" Córdova (PPT)
- **Liza Fernández** (PNP)
- Héctor González Pereira (PIP)
- Fred Guillont Juarbe (PPR)
- Zoé Laboy (PNP)
- José Nadal Power (PPD)
- Ramón Luis Nieves (PPD)

**Bayamón**

- Ruth E. Arroyo Muñoz (PPT)
- Víctor Caraballo (PIP)
- Miguel Reyes Dávila (PPD)
- José Orlando Muñoz (PPD)
- **Migdalia Padilla** (PNP)
- **Carmelo Ríos Santiago** (PNP)
- José A. Ojeda Santos (PIP)
- Carlos Alberto Velázquez (MUS)

**Arecibo**

- Wanda Arroyo (PPD)
- Jaime Bonel González (PIP)
- Rafael Capella Angueira (MUS)
- Luis Cruz (PIP)
- **Angel "Chayanne" Martínez** (PNP)
- José "Joito" Pérez (PNP)
- Rubén Soto (PPD)

**Mayagüez-Aguadilla**

- María Teresa González (PPD)
- Alberto O. Lozada Colón (MUS)
- Edwin Morales Pérez (PPT)
- **Luis Daniel Muñíz** (PNP)
- Gilberto Rodríguez (PPD)
- Orlando Ruiz Pesante (PIP)
- Samuel Soto Bosques (PIP)
- **Evelyn Vázquez** (PNP)

**Ponce**

- **Luis Berdiel** (PNP)
- Javier Maldonado Mercado (PIP)
- Luis Enrique Martínez (PIP)
- Ramón Ruiz (PPD)
- Martín Vargas Morales (PPD)
- Eliezer Velázquez (PNP)

**Guayama**

- Roberto Colón Ocasio (MUS)
- José Enrique Laboy Gómez (PIP)
- Benjamín "Bengie" León (independent)
- Miguel Pereira (PPD)
- Edny Ramírez Pagán (PIP)
- Angel Rodríguez Otero (PPD)
- Miguel Rodríguez (PNP)
- **Carlos Javier Torres** (PNP)

**Humacao**

- Maritza Algarín Sepúlveda (PIP)
- Vilma Calderón Jiménez (MUS)
- **José Luis Dalmau** (PPD)
- **José Ramón Díaz** (PNP)
- José Luis "Tito" Dones (PPR)
- Juan "Cholo" Lebrón (PIP)
- Carlos Mercado Cotto (PPT)
- **Luz M. Santiago González** (PNP)
- **Jorge Suárez Cáceres** (PPD)

**Carolina**

- Pedro José "Pepe" Alvarez (PIP)
- Fabiola Carrasquillo (PPR)
- Edwin M. González (PPR)
- **Roger Iglesias** (PNP)
- Luis Daniel Rivera (PPD)
- Dwight E. Rodríguez Orta (PIP)
- Pedro A. Rodríguez (PPD)
- Guillermo Sosa Rodríguez (MUS)
- **Lornna Soto** (PNP)

=== House of Representatives ===
==== At-large ====
The ballot featured sixteen (16) candidates from six different parties and one independent candidate (bold denotes incumbent candidates)

**New Progressive Party (PNP)**

- **José Aponte**
- **Jenniffer González**
- **José E. Meléndez Ortíz**
- **María Milagros Charbonier**
- **Lourdes Ramos**
- **José "Pichy" Torres Zamora**

**Popular Democratic Party (PPD)**

- **Jaime Perelló**
- **Luis Vega Ramos**
- **Charlie Hernández**
- **Jorge Colberg Toro**
- Eduardo Ferrer Ríos
- **Brenda López de Arrarás**

**Other parties**

- Dennis Márquez (PIP)
- Edwin Meléndez Delgado (PPR)
- José "Tato" Rivera Santana (MUS)
- Eva L. Ayala (PPT)
- Alexander Febus Medina (independent)

== Campaign ==
The campaign of the main opposing party, the PPD, focused mostly on the problems of crime, unemployment, and high utility costs, attributing them to the failure of the incumbent governor, Luis Fortuño, from the PNP. The PNP, on the other hand, focused mostly on the lack of experience of the PPD candidate, Alejandro García Padilla.

The minority parties have directed their campaign at the inability of the main two parties to administer the country. The Puerto Ricans for Puerto Rico Party (PPR) attacked the alleged classism and social inequality of the current government, while the Working People's Party (PPT) advocated for a government more attuned to the working class.

=== Debates ===
There were two official debates celebrated with all gubernatorial candidates. The first one was held on September 11, 2012, under the title of "Vota o Quédate Calla'o" ("Vote or Keep your Mouth Shut"). It was transmitted by the television network of Sistema Universitario Ana G. Méndez. The second debate was held on October 25, 2012, under the title of "El Gran Debate". This debate was transmitted by Telemundo and had the best TV ratings for the night with 18.7 and a 27.3% share.

== Results ==
=== Governor ===
In the morning of November 7, 2012, Fortuño conceded the election to Alejandro García Padilla, just as the last votes were being counted. The margin of victory was 0.7% (or 11,049 votes) which would make it the second closest election in the island in the last 20 years. The candidates of the minority parties all received less than the required 3% to remain registered. Notably, Rogelio Figueroa (from the PPR) received only 0.4% of the vote after receiving 3% in the 2008 general elections.

Candidate	Party	Votes	%
Alejandro García Padilla	Popular Democratic Party	896,060	48.04
Luis Fortuño	New Progressive Party	884,775	47.44
Juan Dalmau	Puerto Rican Independence Party	47,331	2.54
Rafael Bernabe Riefkohl	Working People's Party	18,312	0.98
Arturo Hernández	Movimiento Unión Soberanista	10,523	0.56
Rogelio Figueroa	Puerto Ricans for Puerto Rico Party	6,668	0.36
Write-ins		1,375	0.07
Total		1,865,044	100.00
Valid votes		1,865,044	99.36
Invalid votes		7,488	0.40
Blank votes		4,523	0.24
Total votes		1,877,055	100.00
Registered voters/turnout		2,402,941	78.11
Source: Puerto Rico Election Archive

=== Resident commissioner ===
The incumbent Pedro Pierluisi from the PNP defeated the candidate from the PPD, Rafael Cox Alomar. Pierluisi managed to be reelected, despite the fact that his ballot partner, Governor Fortuño, lost against the PPD candidate. This would be the second time in the last 10 years where the governor and the resident commissioner came from different parties. The first one was after the 2004 elections where PPD candidate Aníbal Acevedo Vilá narrowly won the election, while Fortuño (PNP) was elected resident commissioner.

Candidate	Party	Votes	%
Pedro Pierluisi	New Progressive Party	905,066	48.76
Rafael Cox Alomar	Popular Democratic Party	881,181	47.47
Juan Mercado Nieves	Puerto Rican Independence Party	38,941	2.10
Félix Córdova Iturregui	Working People's Party	13,120	0.71
María de Lourdes Guzmán	Movimiento Unión Soberanista	11,764	0.63
Sadiasept Guillont Juarbe	Puerto Ricans for Puerto Rico Party	5,647	0.30
Write-ins		626	0.03
Total		1,856,345	100.00
Valid votes		1,856,345	99.36
Invalid votes		7,488	0.40
Blank votes		4,523	0.24
Total votes		1,868,356	100.00
Registered voters/turnout		2,402,941	77.75
Source: Puerto Rico Election Archive

=== Senate ===
The PPD won a majority of seats in the Senate of Puerto Rico, with a total of 18 out of 27. The PNP won a total of 8 seats, while the Puerto Rican Independence Party (PIP) won one seat. The PPD won the majority after two terms of being a minority. The election of a senator from the PIP also comes after one term with no senator seated. The PPD won six of the Puerto Rico Senatorial districts. The PNP won only two districts, despite winning all eight during the previous elections.

Party	At-large			District			Total seats
Party	Votes	%	Seats	Votes	%	Seats	Total seats
Popular Democratic Party	822,011	46.02	6	1,767,573	49.44	12	18
New Progressive Party	788,426	44.14	4	1,677,558	46.92	4	8
Puerto Rican Independence Party	138,167	7.74	1	97,626	2.73	0	1
Movimiento Unión Soberanista	11,842	0.66	0	16,384	0.46	0	0
Working People's Party	8,891	0.50	0	9,859	0.28	0	0
Puerto Ricans for Puerto Rico Party	3,256	0.18	0	4,642	0.13	0	0
Other parties	291	0.02	0	1,160	0.03	0	0
Independents	13,327	0.75	0	243	0.01	0	0
Total	1,786,211	100.00	11	3,575,045	100.00	16	27
Valid votes	1,786,211	98.98					
Invalid votes	9,293	0.51					
Blank votes	9,193	0.51					
Total votes	1,804,697	100.00					
Registered voters/turnout	2,402,941	75.10					
Source: Puerto Rico Election Archive

=== House of Representatives ===
The PPD also won a majority of seats in the Puerto Rico House of Representatives, with a total of 28 out of 51. The PNP won a total of 23 seats. The other minority parties won no seats. Like with the Senate, the PPD won the majority after two terms of being a minority.

Party	At-large			District			Total seats
Party	Votes	%	Seats	Votes	%	Seats	Total seats
Popular Democratic Party	842,513	46.93	6	884,677	48.92	22	28
New Progressive Party	826,323	46.03	5	853,571	47.20	18	23
Puerto Rican Independence Party	87,716	4.89	0	48,606	2.69	0	0
Movimiento Unión Soberanista	22,196	1.24	0	7,560	0.42	0	0
Working People's Party	10,656	0.59	0	4,506	0.25	0	0
Puerto Ricans for Puerto Rico Party	4,560	0.25	0	864	0.05	0	0
Other parties	424	0.02	0	8,538	0.47	0	0
Independents	739	0.04	0				0
Total	1,795,127	100.00	11	1,808,322	100.00	40	51
Valid votes	1,795,127	98.98		1,808,322	98.99		
Invalid votes	9,293	0.51		9,293	0.51		
Blank votes	9,193	0.51		9,193	0.50		
Total votes	1,813,613	100.00		1,826,808	100.00		
Registered voters/turnout	2,402,941	75.47		2,402,941	76.02		
Source: Puerto Rico Election Archive

=== Mayors ===
The PPD won a majority of the mayoralty races in the island, with a total of 46 out of 78 municipalities. The New Progressive Party (PNP) won a total of 31. One of the most notable races featured PPD candidate Carmen Yulín Cruz defeating incumbent Jorge Santini (PNP) for the mayoralty of the capital city of San Juan after 12 years in the seat.

Party	Mayoralties
Popular Democratic Party	47
New Progressive Party	31
Puerto Rican Independence Party	0
Movimiento Unión Soberanista	0
Working People's Party	0
Puerto Ricans for Puerto Rico Party	0
Total	78
