= Senator Morales =

Senator Morales may refer to:

- Howie Morales (born 1973), New Mexico State Senate
- Luis Sánchez Morales (1867–1934), Senate of Puerto Rico
- Martín Vargas Morales (born 1971), Senate of Puerto Rico
