= Elsie Calderón =

Puerto Rican politician

Mayor of Trujillo Alto, Puerto Rico
- In office 1973–1976
- Preceded by: Arturo Crespo Valentín
- Succeeded by: José Rivera Díaz

Member of the Puerto Rico Senate from the Carolina District
- In office January 2, 1985 – January 2, 1993

Personal details
- Born: August 10, 1933; Carolina, Puerto Rico
- Died: August 10, 2008 (aged 75); Santurce, Puerto Rico
- Political party: Popular Democratic Party

Elsie Calderón Rodríguez de Hernández (August 10, 1933 – August 10, 2008) was a Puerto Rican politician from the Popular Democratic Party (PPD). Calderón served as mayor of Trujillo Alto, Puerto Rico for one term (1973–1976). She was elected to the Senate of Puerto Rico the Carolina District for two consecutive terms (1985–1993).

== Early years ==
He completed his elementary and secondary studies in the public schools of Carolina and her high school studies at the Colegio la Milagrosa in Río Piedras. She studied shorthand and worked as a stenographer in the administration of Economic Development and at the University of Puerto Rico. She held the position of Municipal Secretary in the Municipality of Trujillo Alto, under the incumbency of Mayor Isabel Díaz Díaz.

== Political career ==
She was elected Mayor of Trujillo Alto, Puerto Rico at the 1972 elections. Lost to José Rivera Díaz at the 1976 elections. She made a return to politics at the 1984 elections and was elected senator for the Carolina District. Was reelected in 1988 for a second term. Lost her seat in the Senate at the 1992 elections.

During her tenure as senator from 1985 to 1992, she chaired the Committee on Municipal Affairs, during which time she chaired the Commission, Law No. 81 of August 30, 1991, known as the "Law of Autonomous Municipalities of Puerto Rico" was approved.

== Death ==
Elsie Calderón on August 10, 2008 in Santurce, Puerto Rico at the age of 75. She was buried at La Santa Cruz Cemetery in Carolina, Puerto Rico.

== Legacy ==
In 2012 The old Trujillo Alto City Hall was remodeled and was posthumously named to the memory of Elsie Calderón.
