= José Emilio González Velázquez =

Puerto Rican politician and senator

Member of the Puerto Rico Senate from the Arecibo district
- In office January 2, 2004 – January 2, 2013
- Succeeded by: José Pérez Rosa

Personal details
- Born: May 11, 1953 (age 73) San Lorenzo, Puerto Rico
- Party: New Progressive Party
- Spouse: María Teresa Massó
- Children: 2
- Education: University of Puerto Rico (BA); Pontifical Catholic University of Puerto Rico School of Law (JD)
- Profession: Politician, Attorney

José Emilio González Velázquez is a Puerto Rican politician and Senator. He was a member of the Senate of Puerto Rico from 2004 to 2013.

== Early years and studies ==
José Emilio González graduated from the University of Puerto Rico in 1974 with a Bachelor's degree in Political Science and earned a Juris Doctor from the Pontifical Catholic University of Puerto Rico School of Law in 1977.

== Professional career ==
After passing the bar exam, González was named District Attorney of the Arecibo region. In 1979, he was promoted to D.A. from the Arecibo Superior Court, where he worked until 1988. That year, he started his own private practice specializing in criminal law.

== Political career ==
In 2004, González was elected to the Senate of Puerto Rico for the District of Arecibo at the 2004 general elections. He was the candidate with most votes for the position in that district. During that first term, he presided the Ethics Commission of the Senate, as well as the Jury Commission.

At the 2008 PNP primary, González won a slot in the ballot of the party and he was reelected at the 2008 general elections. During that second term, González presided the Commission of Criminal Justice. He also served as Secretary of the Natural and Environmental Resources Commission, and was a member of the Health and Government Commissions.

In 2012, González lost his slot for reelection at the PNP primaries, preventing him of running again at the general elections that year.

== Return to private life ==
In December 2012, Governor of Puerto Rico Luis Fortuño appointed González, among others, to become a Superior Judge when he finishes his term as Senator in January 2013. His appointment was approved by the Legislative Assembly of Puerto Rico. He served as a judge in the Arecibo region.
