= José Rivera Díaz =

Puerto Rican politician

Mayor of Trujillo Alto
- In office 1977–1980
- Preceded by: Elsie Calderón
- Succeeded by: Pedro Padilla Ayala

Personal details
- Party: New Progressive Party (PNP)
- Spouse: Christa Schätz
- Children: Thomas; Sylvia; Lynda
- Occupation: Politician

Military service
- Allegiance: United States of America
- Branch/service: United States Army

José "Nía" Rivera Díaz is a Puerto Rican businessman and former politician. He was mayor of Trujillo Alto from 1977 to 1980.

Rivera served in the U.S. Army and was stationed in southern West Germany in the early 1960s. There, he met and married Christa Schätz, a German woman. They moved to New York, where they begat Lynda and Thomas (who became a Puerto Rican Senator and President of the Senate of Puerto Rico). In 1966, they moved to Puerto Rico and begat their daughter Sylvia. During his time as mayor for Trujillo Alto he was executive director of the Puerto Rico Mayors Federation.
