= Ramón Luis Nieves =

Puerto Rican politician

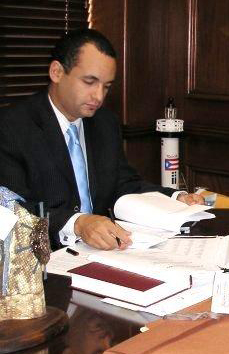

Member of the Puerto Rico Senate from the San Juan district
- In office January 2, 2013 – January 2, 2017

Personal details
- Born: June 13, 1975 (age 51) San Juan, Puerto Rico
- Party: Popular Democratic Party (PPD)
- Education: University of Puerto Rico at Río Piedras (BA); University of Puerto Rico School of Law (JD)
- Profession: Politician

Ramón Luis Nieves Pérez (born June 13, 1975) is a Puerto Rican politician from the Popular Democratic Party (PPD). Nieves was elected to the Senate of Puerto Rico in 2012.

== Early years and studies ==
Ramón Luis Nieves was born in San Juan on June 13, 1975. He was raised in Toa Baja where he lived in 1998. He has lived in San Juan since. Nieves studied at the Colegio San Antonio in Río Piedras graduating in 1993. That same year, he enrolled in the University of Puerto Rico at Río Piedras.

In 1996, Nieves received his bachelor's degree in social sciences after just three years. In 2000, he completed a Juris doctor from the University of Puerto Rico School of Law. That same year, he passed the bar exam which allowed him to practice law in the island.

== Professional career ==
Once he obtained his degree, Nieves began practicing law specializing in contractual and commercial affairs. In 2004, he became Vice-President of Legal Affairs for R&G Financial Corporation. In 2010, he returned to the practice with a private law firm.

Nieves has been an active member of the Puerto Rico Bar Association since 2001. As such, he was appointed by them to be part of the "Ad Hoc Commission on the Death Penalty". Since 2003, he has served as one of the representatives of the Association at the Board of Directors of the Community Legal Office, which offers free legal advice to poor communities in San Juan.

== Political career ==
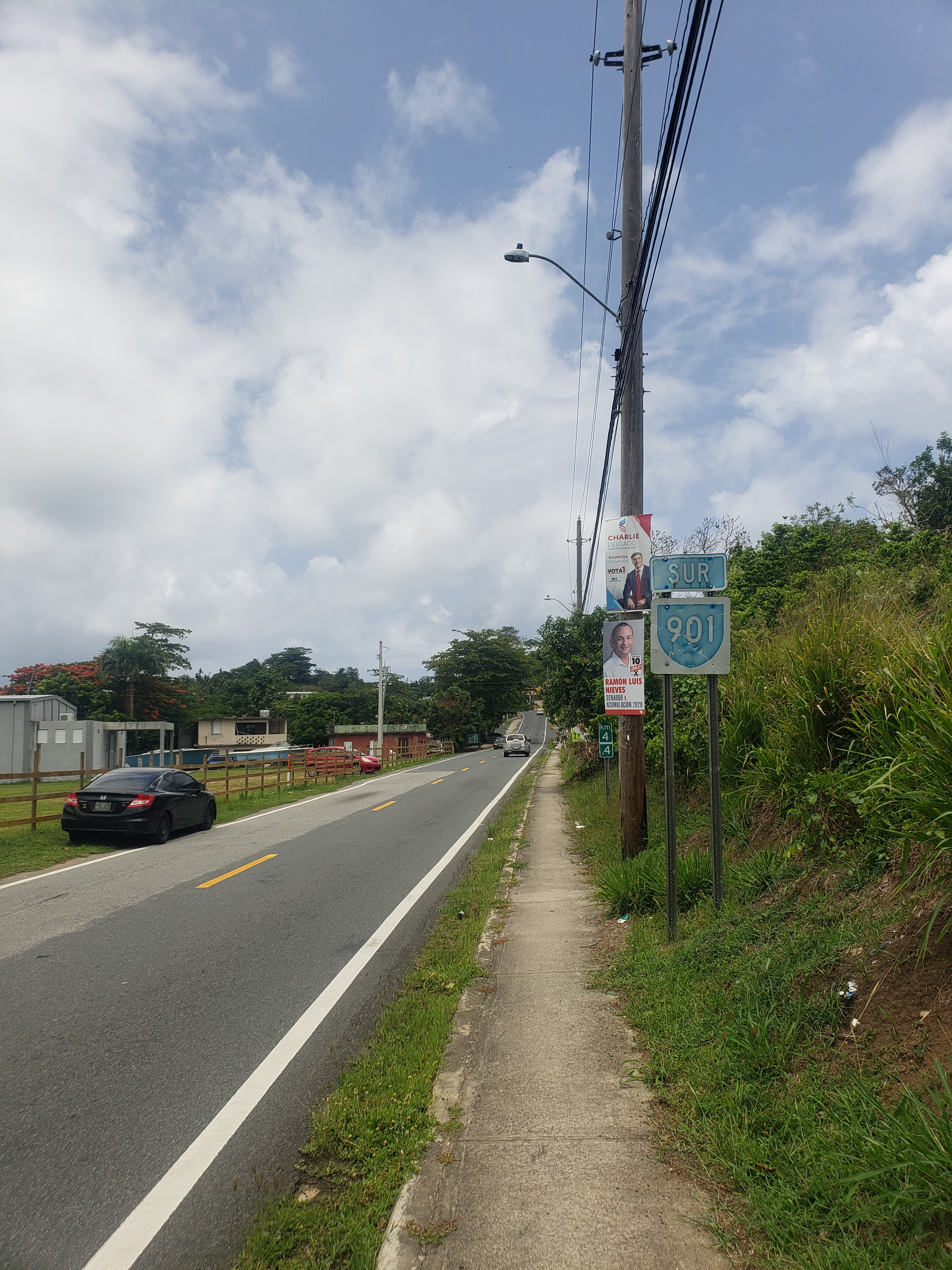
A Nieves' campaign poster is seen on a post on PR-901 in Camino Nuevo barrio in the municipality of Yabucoa.

Nieves is a member of the Popular Democratic Party (PPD). Throughout his life, he has served the party in several areas. From 2008 to 2009, he was part of the radio show Hablando Claro. He has also represented his party in shows like WKAQ en la Noche, Cara a Cara, and others.

In 2009, Nieves was appointed by Senator Antonio Fas Alzamora to be part of the group that would write the "Pact of Association between Puerto Rico and the United States". Nieves, Fas Alzamora, and José Ariel Nazario worked with the document for a year. In 2010, Nieves was also appointed by then-President of the PPD, Héctor Ferrer Ríos, to lead the reorganization of the Precinct 5 of San Juan. From 2010 to 2011, Nieves was also part of the Status Commission, where he served as legal aide.

Nieves ran for a seat in the Senate of Puerto Rico under the Popular Democratic Party (PPD). After winning a spot on the 2012 primaries, he was elected on the general elections to represent the District of San Juan.

== See also ==
- 25th Senate of Puerto Rico
