= José Pérez Rosa =

Puerto Rican politician

Member of the Puerto Rico Senate from the Arecibo district
- In office January 2, 2013 – January 2, 2021
- Preceded by: José Emilio González Velázquez

Personal details
- Born: Arecibo, Puerto Rico
- Party: New Progressive Party (PNP)
- Education: Interamerican University of Puerto Rico at Aguadilla (BE); Pontifical Catholic University of Puerto Rico at Arecibo (BA)
- Profession: Politician

José O. Pérez Rosa, also known as "Joito", is a Puerto Rican politician from the New Progressive Party (PNP). Pérez was elected to the Senate of Puerto Rico in 2012. In 2020, Pérez ran again.

== Early years and studies ==
José Pérez Rosa was born in Arecibo to Nolida Rosa Pérez and José Pérez Soto. Pérez studied at the Antonio Luchetti Vocational School where he received a Technical Degree in Electronics. After graduating, Pérez enrolled at the Interamerican University of Puerto Rico at Aguadilla to obtain a Bachelor's degree in Electronical Engineering. However, with the illness of his father, Pérez had to take over the business and couldn't finish his studies. In 2010, Pérez completed a bachelor's degree in Liberal Studies with a minor in Business Management from the Pontifical Catholic University of Puerto Rico at Arecibo.

== Political career ==
Pérez began his political career in 1992, as part of the campaign of Pedro Rosselló for the 1992 elections. In 1993, he worked with Angel Román, mayor of Arecibo, where he served as Director and Coordinator of Campaigns as well as Electoral Coordinator. From 2004 to 2008, Pérez worked as Administrative Assistant at the House of Representatives with Carlos Molina.

Pérez decided to run for a seat in the Senate of Puerto Rico under the New Progressive Party (PNP). At the 2012 primaries, he defeated incumbent senator José Emilio González Velázquez. Pérez was elected on the general elections to represent the District of Arecibo.

== Personal life ==
Pérez Rosa is married and has two children.

== See also ==
- 25th Senate of Puerto Rico
