= Luis Daniel Rivera (politician) =

Puerto Rican politician

Member of the Puerto Rico Senate from the Carolina district
- In office January 2, 2013 – January 1, 2017

Personal details
- Born: Carolina, Puerto Rico
- Party: Popular Democratic Party (PPD)
- Profession: Politician

Luis Daniel Rivera Filomeno is a Puerto Rican politician from the Popular Democratic Party (PPD). Rivera was elected to the Senate of Puerto Rico in 2012.

Rivera was born in Carolina. He has a Bachelor's degree in Political Science. Rivera has also worked with the Municipality of Carolina. He is married and has two children.

Rivera decided to run for a seat in the Senate of Puerto Rico under the Popular Democratic Party (PPD). After winning a spot on the 2012 primaries, he was elected on the general elections to represent the District of Carolina.

== See also ==
- 25th Senate of Puerto Rico
