= José Nadal Power =

Puerto Rican politician

Member of the Senate of Puerto Rico from the At-large district
- In office January 2, 2017 – January 2, 2021

Member of the Senate of Puerto Rico from the San Juan district
- In office January 2, 2013 – January 2, 2017

Personal details
- Born: December 8, 1973 (age 52) Santurce, Puerto Rico
- Party: Popular Democratic Party (PPD)
- Education: University of Puerto Rico at Río Piedras (BA); University of Puerto Rico School of Law (JD)
- Profession: Politician

José Rafael Nadal Power (born December 8, 1973) is a Puerto Rican politician from the Popular Democratic Party (PPD). Nadal Power was elected to the Senate of Puerto Rico in 2012.

== Early years and studies ==
José Rafael Nadal Power was born in the district of Santurce, in San Juan on December 8, 1973. He studied his elementary and secondary studies in Santurce.

In 1996, Nadal Power received his bachelor's degree in political science from the University of Puerto Rico at Río Piedras. In 1999, he completed a Juris doctor from the University of Puerto Rico School of Law. The following year, he passed the bar exam, which allowed him to practice law in the island. That same year, he was admitted with a scholarship from the International and Iberoameric Foundation of Administration and Public Policy to study a master's degree in applied political studies in Madrid, Spain. He graduated in 2001.

== Professional career ==
Once he obtained his degree, Nadal Power began working for then-mayor of San Juan, Sila Calderón. He then worked as a legislative aide for Resident Commissioner Aníbal Acevedo Vilá in Washington, D.C. When Acevedo Vilá became Governor of Puerto Rico in 2004, Nadal Power was appointed as advisor in municipal affairs and public policy. After two years, Nadal Power started working as an attorney in corporate law, specializing in government employment, ethics, consumer protection, and others.

== Political career ==
Nadal Power decided to run for a seat in the Senate of Puerto Rico under the Popular Democratic Party (PPD). After winning a spot on the 2012 primaries, he was elected on the general elections to represent the District of San Juan.

His political career ended abruptly in 2020, when he failed to submit the required endorsements to run in the PPD's primaries, for which he blamed then candidate for Governor Carlos Delgado Altieri.

== See also ==
- 25th Senate of Puerto Rico
