= Eduardo Ferrer =

Puerto Rican politician

Eduardo Ferrer Ríos

Member of the Puerto Rico House of Representatives from the 6th
- In office May 24, 2012 – July 1, 2013
- Preceded by: Héctor Ferrer

Majority Whip of the Puerto Rico House of Representatives
- In office January 2, 2013 – July 1, 2013

Personal details
- Born: November 28, 1973 (age 52) San Juan, Puerto Rico
- Party: Popular Democratic Party (PPD)

Eduardo Ferrer Ríos (born November 28, 1973) is a Puerto Rican politician. He was elected to the Puerto Rico House of Representatives in the 2012 general election. Ferrer is the brother of former Representative and President of the PPD Héctor Ferrer.

Ferrer won a spot on the PPD ballot at the primaries earlier in 2012. He arrived in seventh place in the voting, and wouldn't have been elected. However, a scandal involving his own brother forced second place candidate Carmen Yulín Cruz to relinquish her ballot spot for Representative to run for Mayor of San Juan, allowing Eduardo to move into sixth place. Due to his brother's resignation from the House, Ferrer was sworn in on May 24, 2012 to fill his spot.

After being officially elected at the 2012 elections, Ferrer was appointed by his party to serve as Majority Whip of the Puerto Rico House of Representatives.

On July 1, 2013, he officially announced his resignation to the House of Representatives.
