= Rafael Cox Alomar =

Puerto Rican politician

Personal details
- Born: December 30, 1974 (age 51) San Juan, Puerto Rico
- Party: Popular Democratic Party
- Spouse: Hilda Rodríguez
- Education: Cornell University (B.A.); University of Oxford (D.Phil.); Harvard Law School (J.D.)
- Profession: Politician, Attorney

Rafael Cox Alomar (born December 30, 1974) is a Puerto Rican lawyer, politician, professor of law and author.

== Early life ==
Cox Alomar was born in San Juan, Puerto Rico on 30 December 1974 to Noemí Alomar Suárez and Rafael Cox Rosario. He graduated from Colegio San Ignacio in 1993 and Cornell University in 1997. He subsequently attended the University of Oxford (Trinity College) on a Marshall Scholarship, earning a D.Phil. in Modern History in 2001. He graduated from Harvard Law School in 2004.

== Professional life ==
He practiced law in Washington, D.C., representing clients in their disputes before the World Bank's International Centre for the Settlement of Investment Disputes. He also practiced law in Puerto Rico with Reichard & Escalera, a local firm. He was a member of the board of directors of the Luis Muñoz Marín Foundation. Currently he is an assistant professor of law at David A. Clarke School of Law at Washington, D.C.

== Resident Commissioner campaign ==
On 26 October 2011, Alejandro García Padilla announced that Cox Alomar would be his running mate in the 2012 election for Resident Commissioner. On accepting the nomination, he committed himself to reaffirming the values of the Commonwealth status, as well as promoting the creation of jobs, bringing attention to public safety, and broadening access to education and health services. He formally filed his candidacy on 30 October 2010.

In May 2012, Cox Alomar became the subject of a scandal when a photograph comparing him to a chimpanzee with the words "R.I.P. Yuyo", was posted on the Twitter account belonging to Zaida R. Hernández Torres, a politician belonging to the New Progressive Party of Puerto Rico. Human rights defenders criticized Hernández for the personal attack against Cox Alomar, who is of Afro-Puerto Rican ancestry, however, in statement she claimed her Twitter account was hacked and that she did not post the offensive image. She later apologized to Cox Alomar and terminated her Twitter account, promising to avoid social networks.

Incumbent Resident Representative Pedro Pierluisi won re-election on November 6, 2012 by a 1.28% margin, with 48.44% of the vote, while Cox Alomar placed second with 47.16%. After his defeat, the elected Mayor of San Juan contracted Cox Alomar as advisor of federal affairs for the city.

== Political views ==
When named as candidate for Resident Commissioner, Cox Alomar avoided describing the Commonwealth status of Puerto Rico as colonial. He has come out against the New Progressive Party's two-stage status referendum, calling it divisive. However, on August 9, 2013, Cox Alomar identified himself with the soberanistas, the PPD's wing that support the creation of a project known as ELA Soberano, a hybrid between a free association compact and elements of the Commonwealth such as the American citizenship and a common coin. When asked to explain the sudden change in relation to the political status, he noted that in order to avoid the promotion of a message that conflicted with García Padilla's support of the territorial commonwealth, the 2012 campaign was targeted at attacking the referendum's credibility. On March 8, 2023, he presented the books "The Constitution of Puerto Rico" and "Towards a new order of things" published in 2022.

== Personal life ==
Cox Alomar is married to Hilda Rodríguez. He is related to former MLB baseball players Sandy Alomar Sr., Roberto Alomar, and Sandy Alomar Jr.
