= María Teresa González =

Puerto Rican politician

Member of the Puerto Rico Senate from the Mayagüez district
- In office January 2, 2013 – September 7, 2016

Personal details
- Born: August 8, 1971 (age 55) Isabela, Puerto Rico
- Party: Popular Democratic Party (PPD)
- Spouse: 3
- Education: University of Puerto Rico School of Law (JD)
- Profession: Politician

María Teresa González is a Puerto Rican politician from the Popular Democratic Party (PPD). González was elected to the Senate of Puerto Rico in 2012.

== Professional career and public service ==
González has worked as an administrative judge for the Special Education Program. She is also a conflict mediator with the Puerto Rico Department of Education.

González has also served as a Judicial Officer for the Municipal Legislature of Mayagüez. During Ferdinand Pérez tenure as Vice-President of the House of Representatives, González served as Administrative Director of his office. She also served as Deputy Director of the Housing and Urban Development Commission.

González is also director of the Luisa Capetillo shelters for victims of domestic violence. She has also worked as professor of Social Science and Humanity in different universities.

== Political career ==
González decided to run for a seat in the Senate of Puerto Rico under the Popular Democratic Party (PPD). After winning a spot on the 2012 primaries, she was elected on the general elections to represent the District of Mayagüez.

Her political career ended when in late 2016, she was accused of corruption. Currently, she is being ascribed with 13 violations of law such as perjury, transfer of falsified documents and false ideology. Representative Efraín de Jesús filled her vacancy in the senate.

== See also ==
- 25th Senate of Puerto Rico
