= Puerto Rico senatorial districts =

Electoral districts for electing senators of Puerto Rico

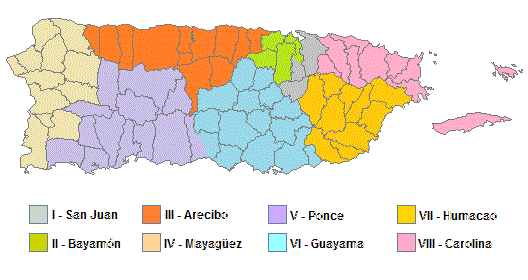
Current senatorial districts of Puerto Rico (2011)

The Puerto Rico senatorial districts (Spanish: distritos senatoriales) refers to the electoral districts in which Puerto Rico is divided for the purpose of electing 16 of the 27 members of the Senate of Puerto Rico (with the other 11 being elected at-large). The archipelago is currently divided in eight senatorial districts, each based on a similar number of inhabitants, and comprising one or more representative districts—the electoral districts in which Puerto Rico is divided for the elections of the members of the House of Representatives. American citizens may vote only for the district in which they have declared their residence, and only for up to two senators per district by plurality-at-large.

== History ==
The first division of senatorial districts occurred in 1917, and came as a result of the signing of the Jones-Shafroth Act. This act allowed for Puerto Ricans to elect their first Senate and provided for the appropriate distribution of the municipalities for their representation in the Senate. Originally, the island was divided in seven senatorial districts.

Through the years, the distribution of the districts has been revised several times. Although in most cases, the revisions are minor, there have been cases where the changes have been significant. For example, in the redistribution of 1952, an eighth district was added. The redistribution of 1972 was also significant in the way that it rearranged the districts.

The last revision occurred in 2011, and it was led by Federico Hernández Denton (President), Virgilio Ramos González, Héctor Luis Acevedo.

== Districts ==
Each electing two senators

District	Municipalities/Barrios	Population
I - San Juan	San Juan; Aguas Buenas; some regions of Guaynabo	462,035
II - Bayamón	Bayamón; Cataño; some regions of Guaynabo; Toa Alta; Toa Baja	459,805
III - Arecibo	Arecibo; Barceloneta; Camuy; Ciales; Dorado; Florida; Hatillo; Manatí; Morovis; Quebradillas; Vega Alta; Vega Baja	470,250
IV - Mayagüez-Aguadilla	Aguada; Aguadilla; Añasco; Cabo Rojo; Hormigueros; Isabela; Las Marías; Mayagüez; Moca; Rincón; San Germán; San Sebastián	478,194
V - Ponce	Adjuntas; Guánica; Guayanilla; Jayuya; some regions of Juana Díaz; Lajas; Lares; Maricao; Peñuelas; Ponce; Sabana Grande; Utuado; Yauco	464,962
VI - Guayama	Aibonito; Arroyo; Barranquitas; Cayey; Cidra; Coamo; Comerío; Corozal; Guayama; some regions of Juana Díaz; Naranjito; Orocovis; Salinas; Santa Isabel; Villalba	462,202
VII - Humacao	Caguas; Gurabo; Humacao; Juncos; Las Piedras; Maunabo; Naguabo; Patillas; San Lorenzo; Yabucoa	462,914
VIII - Carolina	Canóvanas; Carolina; Ceiba; Culebra; Fajardo; Loíza; Luquillo; Río Grande; Trujillo Alto; Vieques	465,427
