= Ángel Rosa =

Puerto Rican politician

Member 25th Senate of Puerto Rico
- In office January 2, 2013 – January 1, 2017

President Organizational Committee for the 2010 Justas Interuniversitarias
- In office 2009–2010

Executive Director University of Puerto Rico, Rio Piedras Campus
- In office 2003–2006

Personal details
- Born: Ángel R. Rosa Rodriguez; October 15, 1970 (age 55) Mayaguez, Puerto Rico
- Party: PPD
- Education: University of Puerto Rico at Mayagüez (BA); Boston University (MA, PhD)
- Profession: professor political analyst radio personality
- Website: Facebook Page

Ángel R. Rosa Rodriguez is a Puerto Rican politician and an academic. Rosa served in the 25th Senate of Puerto Rico. He is a tenured professor at the University of Puerto Rico, Mayaguez Campus. Politically, Rosa is affiliated with the Popular Democratic Party.

== Early life and education ==
Born in Mayagüez, Puerto Rico, Ángel R. Rosa Rodríguez graduated with honors from the Eugenio María de Hostos High School, the largest high school in town, in 1988. In 1992, he received his B.A. in Political Science from the University of Puerto Rico, Mayagüez Campus. He went on to obtain his Master's and Doctorate's degrees from the Boston University in 1998. His 1998 thesis, titled Bargaining for privilege: The alliance between Puerto Rico's Popular Democratic Party and United States multinationals, is about the political influence the now defunct so-called "936 corporations" had in Puerto Rico during their heyday. His doctoral advisor was Irene Gendzier.
