= Gilberto Rodríguez (politician) =

Puerto Rican politician

Member of the Puerto Rico Senate from the Mayagüez district
- In office January 2, 2013 – January 2, 2017

Personal details
- Born: March 14, 1975 (age 51) Mayagüez, Puerto Rico
- Party: Popular Democratic Party (PPD)
- Education: University of Puerto Rico at Mayagüez (BA); Eugenio María de Hostos School of Law (JD)
- Profession: Politician

Gilberto Rodríguez (born March 14, 1975) is a Puerto Rican politician from the Popular Democratic Party (PPD). Rodríguez was elected to the Senate of Puerto Rico in 2012.

== Early years and studies ==
Gilberto Rodríguez was born in Mayagüez on March 14, 1975. He is the oldest of five children, born to Gilberto Rodríguez, Sr. and Carmen Valle. However, he was raised by José Vientos, whom he considers his father. In 1998, Rodríguez received his bachelor's degree in political science from the University of Puerto Rico at Mayagüez, where he served as vice-president of his class. After graduating, he completed a Juris doctor from the Eugenio María de Hostos School of Law.

== Professional career ==
Rodríguez has worked as an attorney and a public notary. He is also a certified mediator with the Judicial Branch.

== Political career ==
At the age of 19, Rodríguez was elected president of the PPD Youth in the neighborhood of Buenaventura, where he lived. In 1997, he was elected vice-president of the PPD University Youth at the University of Puerto Rico in Mayagüez. Rodríguez also ran for the Municipal Assembly of the neighboring town of Las Marías.

Rodríguez decided to run for a seat in the Senate of Puerto Rico under the Popular Democratic Party (PPD). After winning a spot on the 2012 primaries, he was elected on the general elections to represent the District of Mayagüez.

== See also ==
- 25th Senate of Puerto Rico
