= Eduardo Bhatia =

Puerto Rican politician

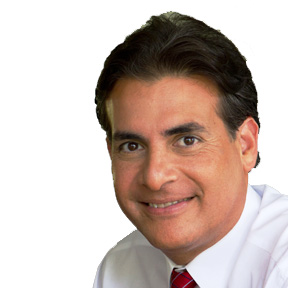
- Bhatia in 2009

Minority Leader of the Puerto Rico Senate
- In office January 2, 2017 – January 2, 2021
- Preceded by: Larry Seilhamer
- Succeeded by: Thomas Rivera Schatz

15th President of the Puerto Rico Senate
- In office January 14, 2013 – January 2, 2017
- Preceded by: Thomas Rivera Schatz
- Succeeded by: Thomas Rivera Schatz

Minority Whip of the Puerto Rico Senate
- In office January 12, 2009 – January 14, 2013
- Preceded by: Sila María González
- Succeeded by: Carmelo Ríos Santiago

Director of the Puerto Rico Federal Affairs Administration
- In office 2005–2009
- Governor: Aníbal Acevedo Vilá
- Preceded by: Mari Carmen Aponte
- Succeeded by: Flavio Cumpiano

Personal details
- Born: Eduardo Bhatia Gautier; May 16, 1964 (age 62) San Salvador, El Salvador
- Party: Popular Democratic
- Other political affiliations: Democratic
- Spouse: Isabel Fernández
- Education: Princeton University (BA); Stanford Law School (JD)

Eduardo Bhatia Gautier (born May 16, 1964) is a Puerto Rican attorney and politician. Bhatia is a former 15th President of the Senate of Puerto Rico and executive director of the Puerto Rico Federal Affairs Administration.

== Early life and education ==
Eduardo Bhatia was born in San Salvador, El Salvador on May 16, 1964. Bhatia's father, the economist and retired professor Mohinder Bhatia, came to Puerto Rico in 1957 as an assistant to a Syracuse University professor who had been in India on a one-year sabbatical. He remained in Puerto Rico and married Carmen Gautier Mayoral in 1961, a political science professor at the University of Puerto Rico and niece-in-law of Felisa Rincón de Gautier. Eduardo Bhatia is one of three siblings. His brother, Andrés Bhatia, is a practicing oncologist in Gainesville, Florida, and his sister, Lisa Bhatia, is an assistant U.S. attorney at the San Juan District office of the U.S. Attorney.

Bhatia Toledo did his secondary studies at Colegio San José. Graduated with an A.B. from the Princeton School of Public and International Affairs in 1986 after completing a 132-page-long senior thesis titled "New Roads for Old Objectives: The Compact of Free Association with the Micronesian Islands and its Applicability to the Future of the Puerto Rico - United States Relationship."

During Bhatia's university years, he was a member of the Princeton Democratic Students Association and the Student Council, actively participating in the student movement against Apartheid in South Africa. In May 1986, Bhatia was awarded a Fulbright scholarship to study law, economics and politics in Santiago, Chile, for one year. Around this time he became a member of Phi Sigma Alpha fraternity.

Bhatia graduated from Stanford Law School in June 1990, where he founded and edited the Stanford Journal of Law and Policy, an academic publication with an emphasis on the development of new laws and public policy. As part of his community work as a law student in Stanford, Bhatia also directed a campaign to prevent the approval of a rent increase in the low-income East Palo Alto community. He is admitted to practice law in Florida, Washington, D.C., and Puerto Rico.

== Professional career ==
After graduating, Bhatia worked for a year as a judicial officer for Judge Levin H. Campbell, at the United States Court of Appeals for the First Circuit in Boston, Massachusetts. From 1991 to 1992, he was the Chief of Staff for Resident Commissioner of Puerto Rico Jaime Fuster in Washington, D.C. From 1993 to 1995, Bhatia worked as a lawyer for the San Juan-based law firm McConnell Valdés.

== Political career ==
=== First term as Senator: 1996–2000 ===
In 1996, at the age of 32, Bhatia was elected Senator at Large by the Popular Democratic Party, becoming the youngest Puerto Rican senator in that four-year term and one of the youngest in the history of the Senate of Puerto Rico. As member of numerous Senatorial committees and spokesperson for his party, his efforts were focused toward increasing employment and educational opportunities for Puerto Rico's youth. He also sought consensus, joining PNP senators in co-sponsoring legislation. An example was the introduction of a bill with Sen. Kenneth McClintock to improve financial education in public schools, which was vetoed by Gov. Pedro Rosselló. A political analyst acknowledged his hard work by calling Mr. Bhatia "Puerto Rico's top senator."

=== Campaign for mayor of San Juan: 2000–2003 ===
In 2000, ran for mayor of San Juan against New Progressive Party candidate Jorge Santini. However, he was defeated by less than 4,000 votes. After that, Bhatia worked as a lawyer in private practice and as a professor at the University of Puerto Rico, School of Law in Rio Piedras, Puerto Rico. During this time Bhatia was also involved in community work.

=== Executive Director of the Puerto Rico Federal Affairs Administration: 2005–2008 ===
In January 2005, Governor Aníbal Acevedo Vilá appointed Bhatia as Executive Director of the Puerto Rico Federal Affairs Administration in Washington, D.C. As such, Bhatia represented the Governor on matters before state and federal agencies as well as before Congress and the Executive branch. He managed PRFAA's staff in the areas of Government Affairs, Federal Grants, Communications, Outreach and Public Affairs and Community Affairs, to carry out the agency's mission of advancing the well-being of the Commonwealth of Puerto Rico, and of Puerto Ricans in the United States.

As the Governor's Official Representative in the United States, he worked in education, health and environmental issues. He had also been working in special projects that will help increase economic growth in Puerto Rico's rural areas.

Bhatia resigned to the position on February 15, 2008, to run again for Senator. He was succeeded by attorney Flavio Cumpiano.

=== Second term as Senator: 2008–2020 ===
Bhatia was elected as an official Senate candidate in the PPD primary on March 9, 2008, becoming the second most voted person of all the pre-candidates for Senate. At the 2008 general elections, Bhatia won one of only five Senate seats obtained by his party. After the elections, the PPD Senate caucus reelected Senator José Luis Dalmau for a third term as PPD Senate Leader and elected Bhatia as Minority Whip.

Bhatia presented his candidacy for reelection in 2012. At the primaries that year, he was the candidate with most votes, securing his spot for the general elections. During the elections, Bhatia was the PPD candidate to the Senate with most votes, and the second overall. After the win, Senator Eduardo Bhatia was elected among his peers as the 15th President of the Senate of the Commonwealth of Puerto Rico.

Bhatia was reelected once more in the 2016 General Election. However, his party lost the majority in the Senate and he was succeeded by Thomas Rivera Schatz as the President of the Senate of Puerto Rico.

=== Tenure as Senate President ===
During his tenure as Senate President, Bhatia was selected as Chair of the Council of State Governments of the Eastern Regional Conference (CSG-ERC) and later elected as President of the National Hispanic Caucus of State Legislators, by 72% of the vote, becoming the first Senate President and the first Puerto Rican, resident of the island to preside over the organization. He also seats in the board of the Council of State Government (CSG), National Association of Latino Elected Officials (NALEO) and the National Hispanic Leadership Agenda (NHLA). During his tenure, he has authored Puerto Rico's Energy Reform law and has tackled education reform legislation.

== Personal life ==
Bhatia is married to Panamanian attorney Isabel Cristina Fernández. His mother, Carmen, was a Puerto Rican while his father, Mohinder, was of Punjabi Sikh heritage hailing from Mirpur (in today's Pakistan) who migrated to India in 1947.

== Notes ==
Senate of Puerto Rico
Preceded by Sila María González	Minority Whip of the Puerto Rico Senate; 2009–2013	Succeeded by Carmelo Ríos Santiago
Preceded by Larry Seilhamer	Minority Leader of the Puerto Rico Senate; 2017–2021	Succeeded by Thomas Rivera Schatz
Political offices
Preceded by Thomas Rivera Schatz	President of the Puerto Rico Senate; 2013–2017	Succeeded by Thomas Rivera Schatz
