= Martín Vargas Morales =

Puerto Rican politician

Member of the Puerto Rico Senate from the Ponce district
- In office January 2, 2013 – January 2, 2017

Mayor of Guánica
- In office January 2, 2001 – January 1, 2013
- Preceded by: Edwin Galarza Quiñones
- Succeeded by: Santos Seda

Personal details
- Born: December 12, 1971 (age 54)
- Party: Popular Democratic Party (PPD)
- Spouse: Waleska Lugo
- Education: Instituto de Banca y Comercio (AS)
- Profession: Politician

Martín Vargas Morales (born December 12, 1971) is a Puerto Rican politician from the Popular Democratic Party (PPD). Vargas served as Mayor of Guánica for three consecutive terms (2000-2012). He was elected to the Senate of Puerto Rico in 2012.

Vargas Morales was elected mayor of Guánica in the 2000 general elections. Vargas was reelected in 2004 and 2008.

Earned an associate degree from Instituto de Banca y Comercio.

Vargas Morales ran for a seat in the Senate of Puerto Rico stating he was frustrated at how the legislative process worked against the citizens. After winning a spot on the 2012 primaries, he was elected on the general elections to represent the District of Ponce, and subsequently served as senator representing Puerto Rico's District V.

== See also ==
- 25th Senate of Puerto Rico
