= Ángel M. Rodríguez Otero =

Puerto Rican politician

Ángel Rodríguez Otero

Member of the Puerto Rico Senate from the Guayama district
- In office January 2, 2001 – January 1, 2005
- In office January 2, 2013 – January 2, 2017

Personal details
- Born: January 1, 1967 (age 59) Comerío, Puerto Rico
- Party: Popular Democratic Party
- Education: University of Puerto Rico (MPA)
- Profession: Politician, Senator

Ángel M. Rodríguez Otero is a Puerto Rican politician from the Popular Democratic Party (PPD). Rodríguez was elected to the Senate of Puerto Rico in 2012.

Rodríguez was born in Comerío to a family of 10 children, including himself. He has a Master's degree in Public Administration from the University of Puerto Rico.

Rodríguez decided to run for a seat in the Senate of Puerto Rico under the Popular Democratic Party (PPD). After winning a spot on the 2012 primaries, he was elected on the general elections to represent the District of Guayama.

== See also ==
- 25th Senate of Puerto Rico
