= Pedro A. Rodríguez =

Puerto Rican politician (born 1968)

Mayor of Trujillo Alto
- Incumbent
- Assumed office 2022
- Preceded by: Jose Luis Cruz Cruz

Member of the Senate of Puerto Rico for the Carolina district
- In office January 2, 2012 – January 2, 2016

Member Puerto Rico House of Representatives from the 38th District
- In office January 2, 2001 – January 1, 2009
- Preceded by: Iván Figueroa Figueroa
- Succeeded by: Eric Correa Rivera
- In office March 3, 2011 – January 1, 2013
- Preceded by: Luis Farinacci
- Succeeded by: Javier Aponte Dalmau

Personal details
- Born: September 25, 1968 (age 58) San Juan, Puerto Rico
- Party: Popular Democratic Party (PPD)
- Education: Interamerican University of Puerto Rico (BA)
- Profession: Politician

Pedro Alfonzo Rodríguez González (born September 25, 1968) is a Puerto Rican politician from the Popular Democratic Party (PPD). Rodríguez was elected to the Senate of Puerto Rico in 2012. He also served as member of the House of Representatives of Puerto Rico in two separate instances (2001–2009 and 2011–2013), the last one to fill the vacancy left by Luis Farinacci.

== Early years and studies ==
Pedro A. Rodríguez was born in San Juan on September 25, 1968. He has a bachelor's degree in political science from the Interamerican University of Puerto Rico. Rodríguez has also worked as a businessman, including operating an elder-care business.

== Professional career ==
Since the mid-90s, Rodríguez has worked as a retailer.

== Political career ==
Rodríguez began his political career in 1993, when he was elected to the Municipal Assembly of Trujillo Alto.

In 2000, Rodríguez was elected to the House of Representatives for District 38 at the general elections. In 2004, he was reelected and remained in the position until 2008, when he was defeated by the PNP candidate.

On March 3, 2011, with the resignation of Representative Luis Farinacci to the House of Representatives surfaced, Rodríguez became a representative again because of the Minority Law. As representative, he became speaker of his party in the Commissions of Sports and Recreation, and Youth Affairs. He also served as member of the Commissions of the Development of the Tourist Industry, Retirement Systems, and Transportation.

Rodríguez decided to run for a seat in the Senate of Puerto Rico under the Popular Democratic Party (PPD) at the 2012 elections. After winning a spot on the 2012 primaries, he was elected to represent the District of Carolina.

== See also ==
- 25th Senate of Puerto Rico
