= Thomas Rivera Schatz =

President of the Senate of Puerto Rico

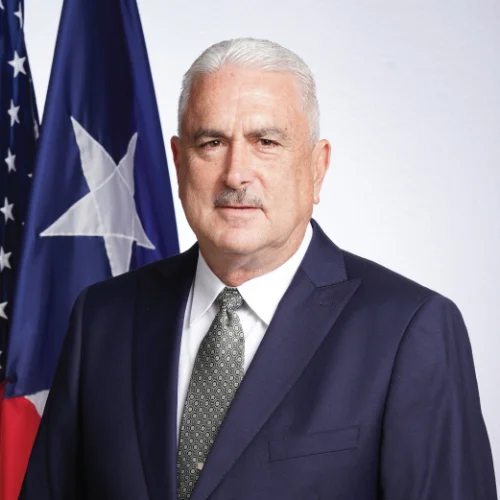
- Rivera Schatz in 2025

President of the Puerto Rico Senate
- Incumbent
- Assumed office January 2, 2025
- Preceded by: José Luis Dalmau
- In office January 2, 2017 – January 2, 2021
- Preceded by: Eduardo Bhatia
- Succeeded by: José Luis Dalmau
- In office January 2, 2009 – January 2, 2013
- Preceded by: Kenneth McClintock
- Succeeded by: Eduardo Bhatia

Minority Leader of the Puerto Rico Senate
- In office January 2, 2021 – January 2, 2025
- Preceded by: Eduardo Bhatia
- Succeeded by: Luis Javier Hernández Ortiz

Chair of the New Progressive Party
- Acting
- In office July 22, 2019 – August 16, 2020
- Preceded by: Ricardo Rosselló
- Succeeded by: Pedro Pierluisi

Member of the Puerto Rico Senate from the at-large district
- Incumbent
- Assumed office January 2, 2009

Personal details
- Born: June 10, 1966 (age 60) New York City, New York, U.S.
- Party: New Progressive
- Other political affiliations: Republican
- Relatives: José Rivera Díaz (father)
- Education: Interamerican University of Puerto Rico (BA, JD)

Thomas Rivera Schatz (born June 10, 1966), also known by his initials TRS, is a Puerto Rican politician, legal advisor, attorney, and former prosecutor, who was the fourteenth, sixteenth and is currently the eighteenth President of the Senate of Puerto Rico. He is affiliated with New Progressive Party of Puerto Rico (abbr. PNP in Spanish) and the USA's Republican Party.

His tenure as president of the senate has been marred with multiple scandals regarding ghost employees on the payroll of his office, and the conviction of several of his closest colleagues and subordinates on corruption charges, including Héctor Martínez Maldonado, José Gómez Zaldo, Juan Carlos Acosta Ramírez, Alex Emille Martínez Morales, among others.

== Early life and studies ==
Rivera Schatz was born on June 10, 1966, in the Bronx Borough of New York City. He is the son of José A. "Nía" Rivera, a past mayor of Trujillo Alto, and Christina Schatz, a German woman. While in college, he worked full-time at the City of San Juan Public Works Department. He attended the Interamerican University of Puerto Rico School of Law, where he graduated in 1992. A year later, he passed the bar exam required to practice law in Puerto Rico.

Rivera Schatz started his legal career as a legal advisor in the Senate and House of Representatives of Puerto Rico. In 1996, Governor Pedro Rosselló appointed him as a prosecutor at the Puerto Rico Department of Justice. After finishing his service as a prosecutor, he returned to private practice, handling both criminal and civil cases.

== Political career ==
=== Electoral Commissioner and Secretary General: 2000–2007 ===
In 2000, Rivera Schatz was named Electoral Commissioner for the pro-statehood New Progressive Party (PNP).

Two years later, party president Pedro Rosselló named Rivera Schatz as secretary general of the PNP in addition to his current position as electoral commissioner. He served both positions simultaneously until August 1, 2007, when he decided to run for senator.

During his tenure as PNP Secretary General, Rivera Schatz orchestrated the expulsion or suspension of five sitting PNP senators who had refused to support Pedro Rosselló's bid to unseat McClintock as Senate President, calling the dissenting senators "traitors". Rivera Schatz filed the party grievances, imposed sanctions without hearings or prior notice, and barred several of them from running under the PNP banner. The senators challenged the actions in court, and in 2007 the Puerto Rico Supreme Court ruled 5-1 against Rivera Schatz and the PNP, finding that the party had violated both its own internal regulations and the Electoral Law's due process guarantees. This episode was not an isolated incident but an early and documented demonstration of the authoritarian political style that would define Rivera Schatz's career: using institutional mechanisms to silence dissent, punish disloyalty, and consolidate power — a pattern that would repeat itself, with greater reach and consequence, during his years as Senate President.

=== .Senator: 2008–present ===
Rivera Schatz ran for senator at the PNP primaries where he won a slot in the ballot, receiving the second-most votes. In the 2008 general elections, Rivera Schatz was elected senator. His fellow senators then elected him to be the 14th president of Puerto Rico's Senate. As such, he selected the following persons for his team:

- Senator Margarita Nolasco as Senate President Pro tempore
- Senator Larry Seilhamer as majority leader
- Senator Melinda Romero as Majority Whip
- Roberto "Junior" Maldonado as chief administrative officer of the Senate.
- Senate Secretary Manuel A. Torres was nominated by Rivera Schatz and reelected to a second term, becoming the first Senate secretary to serve under two different Senate Presidents
- Incumbent Superintendent of the Capitol, Eliezer Velázquez, was nominated by Rivera Schatz and ratified by House Speaker Jenniffer González for a second term, a first for a superintendent.

Rivera Schatz was sworn into his post on January 12, 2009.

Thomas Rivera Schatz was reelected in 2012 and elected for the third time as a member of the Senate majority in the 2016 election with 10.33% of the "at large" votes, placing him in second place after independent senatorial candidate Dr. José Vargas Vidot and followed by Juan Dalmau of the Puerto Rico Independence Party (PIP). Rivera Schatz was elected to a second term as President of the Senate of Puerto Rico starting January 2017. He holds two records, first as the only reelected Senate President during the past 28 years and the only Senate President ever elected as such to non-consecutive terms. On November 5, 2024, he was elected President of the Senate for a third non-consecutive term.

== PNP President ==
On July 22, 2019, Rivera Schatz announced he would succeed Puerto Rican Governor Ricardo Rosselló as head of the New Progressive Party of Puerto Rico (PNP). Rosselló announced his intention to resign due to the ongoing controversy surrounding Telegramgate.

== Personal life ==
Rivera Schatz and his father collect antique cars, and are fans of the New York Yankees. He is the father of 2 children.

Political offices
Preceded by Kenneth McClintock	President of the Puerto Rico Senate; 2009–2013	Succeeded by Eduardo Bhatia
Preceded by Eduardo Bhatia	President of the Puerto Rico Senate; 2017–2021	Succeeded by José Luis Dalmau
Preceded by José Luis Dalmau	President of the Puerto Rico Senate; 2025–present	Incumbent
Party political offices
Preceded by Ricardo Rosselló	Chair of the Puerto Rico New Progressive Party; Acting; 2019–2020	Succeeded by Pedro Pierluisi
Senate of Puerto Rico
Preceded by Eduardo Bhatia	Minority Leader of the Puerto Rico Senate; 2021–2025	Succeeded by Luis Javier Hernández Ortiz
