= Puerto Rico senatorial district VII =

Profile and election results

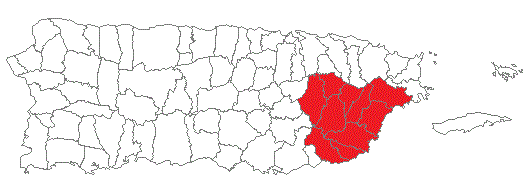
Map of Puerto Rico, highlighting senatorial district VII

Puerto Rico senatorial district VII, also known as the senatorial district of Humacao, is one of the eight senatorial districts of Puerto Rico. As of the 2024 general elections, it is represented by Wanda Soto Tolentino and Luis Daniel Colón La Santa, both from the New Progressive Party.

== District profile ==
Senatorial district VII has an approximate population of 462,914. It covers the following municipalities:

- Caguas
- Gurabo
- Humacao
- Juncos
- Las Piedras
- Maunabo
- Naguabo
- Patillas
- San Lorenzo
- Yabucoa

In previous distributions, the territory covered by senatorial district VII has changed. In 1972, the district included the municipalities of Río Grande, Luquillo, Fajardo, and Ceiba. However, it didn't include Arroyo, Maunabo, or Patillas. In 1983, Aguas Buenas, Arroyo, Maunabo, and Patillas were reassigned to the district, while Río Grande, Luquillo, and Fajardo were reassigned to the district of Carolina. In the 1991 redistribution, Ceiba was assigned to the district of Carolina.

In the 2002 redistribution, Arroyo was assigned to the district of Guayama, and in the 2011 redistribution, Aguas Buenas was reassigned to the district of San Juan.

== Election results ==
=== 2012 ===
Puerto Rican general election, 2012
Party	Candidate	Votes	%	±%
Popular Democratic Party (PPD)	José Luis Dalmau	117,610	26.37	+2.65
Popular Democratic Party (PPD)	Jorge Suárez	114,165	25.60	+2.88
New Progressive Party (PNP)	José Ramón Díaz	98,361	22.06	-2.02
New Progressive Party (PNP)	Luz M. Santiago	97,800	21.93	-2.14
Puerto Rican Independence Party (PIP)	Maritza Algarín Sepúlveda	5,552	1.24	—
Puerto Rican Independence Party (PIP)	Juan "Cholo" Lebrón	5,081	1.14	+0.18
Movimiento Unión Soberanista (MUS)	Vilma Calderón Jiménez	2,417	0.54	—
Worker's People Party of Puerto Rico (PPT)	Carlos R. Mercado Cotto	1,378	0.31	—
Puerto Ricans for Puerto Rico Party (PPR)	José Luis "Tito" Dones	797	0.18	—
Total votes		445,970	100	

=== 2008 ===
Puerto Rican general election, 2008
Party	Candidate	Votes	%	±%
New Progressive Party (PNP)	José Ramón Díaz	117,408	24.08%	—
New Progressive Party (PNP)	Luz M. Santiago	117,341	24.07	—
Popular Democratic Party (PPD)	José Luis Dalmau	115,612	23.72	-0.30
Popular Democratic Party (PPD)	Jorge Suárez	110,777	22.72	—
Puerto Ricans for Puerto Rico Party (PPR)	Sylvia Roldán Cruz	7,227	1.48	—
Puerto Ricans for Puerto Rico Party (PPR)	Angel Nieves Rivera	6,740	1.38	—
Puerto Rican Independence Party (PIP)	Felícita Cotto Ortíz	4,865	1.00	—
Puerto Rican Independence Party (PIP)	Juan Lebrón López	4,678	0.96	—
Total votes		487,476	100.0	

=== 2004 ===
Puerto Rican general election, 2004
Party	Candidate	Votes	%	±%
Popular Democratic Party (PPD)	José Luis Dalmau	119,859	24.38%	+0.18
Popular Democratic Party (PPD)	Sixto Hernández Serrano	118,329	24.07	+0.07
New Progressive Party (PNP)	Pickie Díaz	115,829	23.56	—
New Progressive Party (PNP)	Rafy Uceta	114,679	23.33	—
Puerto Rican Independence Party (PIP)	Raúl Tirado	10,413	2.12	—
Puerto Rican Independence Party (PIP)	Víctor Torres Ortíz	10,021	2.04	-0.66
Total votes		491,590	100.0	
