= Migdalia Padilla =

Puerto Rican politician

Migdalia Padilla Alvelo
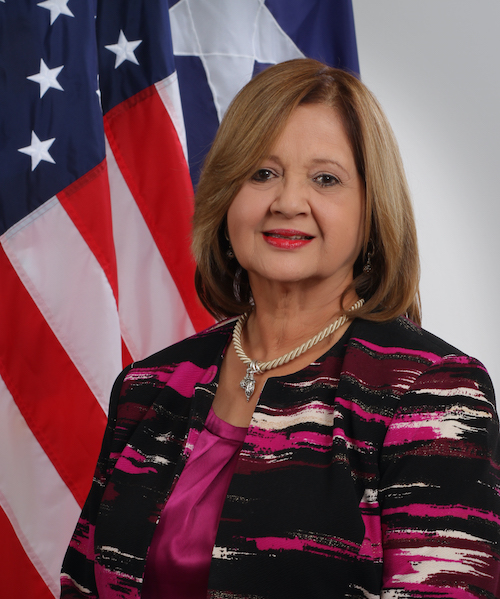
- Padilla in 2017

Member of the Puerto Rico Senate from the Bayamón district
- Incumbent
- Assumed office May 30, 2000

Personal details
- Born: January 18 Barranquitas, Puerto Rico
- Party: New Progressive Party
- Education: Pontifical Catholic University of Puerto Rico (B.Ed.); Phoenix University (M.Ed)
- Profession: Politician

Migdalia Padilla Alvelo is a Puerto Rican politician and Senator. She has been a member of the Senate of Puerto Rico since 2000.

== Early years and studies ==
Migdalia Padilla was born in Barranquitas, Puerto Rico. Her parents are Monserrate Alvelo and Adrián Padilla. She obtained her bachelor's degree in Elemental Education from the Pontifical Catholic University of Puerto Rico, and her master's degree in Administration and School Supervision from Phoenix University.

== Professional career ==
Padilla has worked for the Puerto Rico Department of Education as a teacher and school director, and for the Puerto Rico Department of Transportation and Public Works as the aide of Secretary Carlos Pesquera during the 90s.

== Political career ==
Padilla began her political career serving at electoral colleges, and then as an Electoral Instructor, and Electoral Director of the District of Bayamón. She also served as Director of the New Progressive Party in Bayamón.

In the 2000 elections, Padilla was elected as Senator for the District of Bayamón. She, along with Pablo LaFontaine, were the only District Senators elected for the PNP in that election. Padilla was sworn in on May 30, 2000 becoming the first female Senator of the District. She was reelected in 2004 and 2008, being the candidate with most votes in both occasions. She was then reelected in 2012, 2016, 2020 and 2024.
