= Puerto Rico senatorial district VI =

Profile and election results

Senate District VI - Guayama
- Distrito Senatorial VI - Guayama
- Senate district for the Senate of Puerto Rico
- Population: 409,415
- Electorate: 264,014

Current Senate district
- Created: 1917
- Seats: 2
- Party: New Progressive Party
- Senators: Rafael (Rafy) Santos Ortiz; Wilmer Reyes Berríos
- Last Redistribution: 2020

Puerto Rico senatorial district VI, also known as the senatorial district of Guayama, is one of the eight senatorial districts of Puerto Rico.

== District profile ==
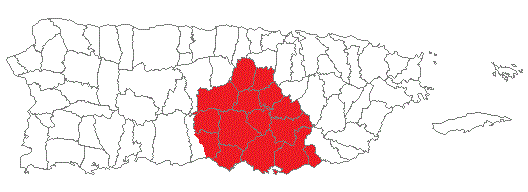
Map of Puerto Rico, highlighting senatorial district VI

Senatorial district VI has an approximate population of 409,415. It covers the following municipalities:

- Aibonito
- Arroyo
- Barranquitas
- Cayey
- Cidra
- Coamo
- Comerío
- Corozal
- Guayama
- Naranjito
- Orocovis
- Salinas
- Santa Isabel
- Villalba
- and some regions of Juana Díaz

In previous distributions, the territory covered by senatorial district VI has changed. In 1972, the district didn't include Orocovis, but included Arroyo, Patillas, and Maunabo. It also included all of Juana Díaz. In 1983, Arroyo, Patillas, and Maunabo were reassigned to the district of Humacao, while Orocovis was reassigned to Guayama. In the 1991 redistribution, Morovis was assigned to the district.

In the 2002 redistribution, Arroyo was assigned to the district, and Morovis was reassigned again to the district of Bayamón. In the 2011 redistribution, some regions of Juana Díaz were assigned to the district of Ponce.

== Election results ==
=== 2012 ===
Puerto Rican general election, 2012
Party	Candidate	Votes	%	±%
Popular Democratic Party (PPD)	Miguel Pereira	122,184	25.10	—
Popular Democratic Party (PPD)	Angel M. Rodríguez	120,336	24.72	+1.99
New Progressive Party (PNP)	Carlos Torres Torres	114,916	23.60	-1.59
New Progressive Party (PNP)	Miguel Rodríguez	113,877	23.39	—
Puerto Rican Independence Party (PIP)	Edny Ramírez Pagán	5,287	1.20	—
Puerto Rican Independence Party (PIP)	José Enrique Laboy Gómez	5,758	1.18	—
Movimiento Unión Soberanista (MUS)	Roberto Colón Ocasio	1,127	0.23	—
Independent	Benjamín "Bengie" León	200	0.04	—
Total votes		486,845	100	

=== 2008 ===
Puerto Rican general election, 2008
Party	Candidate	Votes	%	±%
New Progressive Party (PNP)	Carlos Torres Torres	131,801	25.19%	—
New Progressive Party (PNP)	Antonio Soto Díaz	130,595	24.96	—
Popular Democratic Party (PPD)	Eder Ortíz Ortíz	119,630	22.86	—
Popular Democratic Party (PPD)	Angel M. Rodríguez	118,950	22.73	-1.01
Puerto Ricans for Puerto Rico Party (PPR)	Myrta Rivera Hernández	5,352	1.02	—
Puerto Rican Independence Party (PIP)	Aida Luz Cruz	5,050	0.97	—
Puerto Rican Independence Party (PIP)	Nelson Rodríguez Bonilla	4,741	0.91	—
Puerto Ricans for Puerto Rico Party (PPR)	Angel Rafael Rodríguez	4,403	0.84	—
Total votes		523,235	100.0	

=== 2004 ===
Puerto Rican general election, 2004
Party	Candidate	Votes	%	±%
New Progressive Party (PNP)	Margarita Nolasco	127,840	24.26%	—
Popular Democratic Party (PPD)	Cirilo Tirado	126,184	23.95	-0.45
New Progressive Party (PNP)	Osvaldo Ortolaza	126,145	23.94	—
Popular Democratic Party (PPD)	Angel M. Rodríguez	125,084	23.74	-0.66
Puerto Rican Independence Party (PIP)	María Yadira Díaz	10,139	1.92	—
Puerto Rican Independence Party (PIP)	Juan Malavé Colón	9,053	1.72	—
Total votes		526,953	100.0	
