= Larry Seilhamer Rodríguez =

Puerto Rican politician

Larry Seilhamer
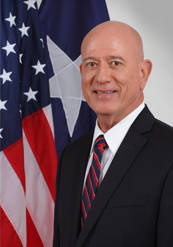

Secretary of State of Puerto Rico
- In office January 2, 2021 – May 25, 2021
- Governor: Pedro Pierluisi
- Preceded by: Raúl Márquez Hernández
- Succeeded by: Félix Rivera Torres (Acting)

President pro tempore of the Puerto Rico Senate
- In office January 2017 – January 2020
- Preceded by: José Luis Dalmau
- Succeeded by: Henry Neumann

Minority Whip of the Puerto Rico Senate
- In office January 2013 – January 2016
- Preceded by: José Luis Dalmau
- Succeeded by: Eduardo Bhatia

Majority Leader of the Puerto Rico Senate
- In office August 2011 – December 2012
- Preceded by: Roberto Arango
- Succeeded by: Aníbal José Torres

Member of the Puerto Rico Senate from the at-large district
- In office January 2013 – December 2020

Member of the Puerto Rico Senate from the Ponce district
- In office January 2009 – January 2013 Serving with Luis Berdiel
- Preceded by: Ramón Ruiz; Martín Vargas Morales
- Succeeded by: Modesto Agosto Alicea; Bruno Ramos

Personal details
- Born: December 13, 1954 (age 71) New York City, New York, U.S.
- Party: New Progressive
- Other political affiliations: Republican
- Children: 4
- Education: University of New Haven (BS); University of Puerto Rico, Mayagüez (BS)
- Basketball career

Career information
- Playing career: 1972–1984

Career history
- 1972–1978 1981–1982: Leones
- 1979–1980: Indios
- 1983–1984: Vaqueros

Lawrence N. "Larry" Seilhamer Rodríguez (born December 13, 1954) is a Puerto Rican politician who was the Secretary of State of Puerto Rico. He is affiliated with the pro-statehood New Progressive Party (PNP), and was a member of the Senate of Puerto Rico from January 7, 2009, until January 15, 2020. Seilhamer is also a former basketball player for the Baloncesto Superior Nacional from 1972 to 1984. On December 2, 2020, he was nominated as Puerto Rico Secretary of State by Governor-elect Pedro R. Pierluisi.

== Early years and education ==
Seilhamer Rodríguez was born in New York City on December 13, 1954. His parents were George Seilhamer and Isabel Rodríguez, and he is the youngest of four children. Seilhamer was raised in Ponce, Puerto Rico, where he studied his elementary and high school at the Santa María Academy.

In 1976, Seilhamer received his bachelor's degree in civil engineering from the University of New Haven, graduating cum laude. In 1979, he completed a second bachelor's degree in Science, with a concentration in Pre-medicine, from the University of Puerto Rico at Mayagüez. In 1983, Seilhamer joined the College of Engineers and Surveyors of Puerto Rico as a licensed engineer.

== Sports career ==
During his time in college, Seilhamer was part of the basketball team of the University of New Haven. When he was 17 years old, he also joined the Baloncesto Superior Nacional league, as a member of the Leones de Ponce. After playing for the Indios de Canóvanas and the Vaqueros de Bayamón, he retired in 1984. During his 1980 season with Canóvanas, Seilhamer averaged 13.5 points per game.

Seilhamer is also a tennis player, and represented Puerto Rico in several tournaments. In 2001 and 2004, Seilhamer was owner of the Leonas de Ponce female volleyball team.

=== BSN player statistics ===
Legend
GP	Games played	GS	Games started	MPG	Minutes per game
FG%	Field goal percentage	3P%	3-point field goal percentage	FT%	Free throw percentage
RPG	Rebounds per game	APG	Assists per game	SPG	Steals per game
BPG	Blocks per game	PPG	Points per game	**Bold**	Career high

Year	Team	GP	FG%	3P%	FT%	RPG	APG	PPG
1972	Ponce	5	.423	-	.400	2.2	1.0	5.2
1973	Ponce	28	.406	-	.708	1.4	0.5	7.0
1974	Ponce	28	.339	-	.553	1.2	0.4	3.5
1975	Ponce	29	.455	-	.673	2.6	0.6	7.4
1976	Ponce	31	.431	-	.627	**3.3**	0.8	7.2
1977	Ponce	31	.419	-	.667	1.8	1.1	6.5
1978	Ponce	29	.478	-	.661	2.3	**2.2**	10.9
1979	Canóvanas	26	.497	-	.621	2.2	0.9	7.8
1980	Canóvanas	30	.500	-	.723	2.3	1.4	**13.5**
1981	Ponce	**32**	**.545**	.000	.723	2.8	1.5	13.3
1982	Ponce	22	.369	-	.615	1.4	0.6	4.2
1983	Bayamón	29	.432	**.500**	.667	1.6	1.0	6.5
1984	Bayamón	21	.402	.286	**.750**	0.6	0.6	4.6
Career		341	.456	.294	.666	2.0	1.0	7.9

== Political career ==
As part of his political career, Seilhamer worked for the Autonomous Municipality of Ponce as Director of Budget and Planning Operations, as well as Director of Housing and Urban Development. More recently he was the president of Southern Consultants and Engineers, an engineering and surveying company based in Ponce.

In February 2007, Seilhamer decided to participate in the primaries of his party for the Senate of Puerto Rico. On March 9, 2008, he received the most votes for the position of Senator for the District of Ponce. On November 4, 2008, he was elected as Senator at the general elections, being the first time the New Progressive Party had won that district in 16 years.

Seilhamer was elected to the Puerto Rico Senate on November 4, 2008, representing the District of Ponce. In the Senate, he is the chairman of the Urban and Infrastructure Committee. In addition, his fellow senators chose him to serve as the Senate Majority Whip for the 2009–2012 term, making him the fourth highest-ranking member of the Puerto Rico Senate.

In August, 2011, Seilhamer became Senate Majority Leader, after he was chosen to fill the vacancy left by Roberto Arango. He also became chairman of the Comisión de Reglas y Calendario (English: Rules and Scheduling Committee). He is also President of the Special Commission for the Puerto de las Américas.

=== Re-election ===
On 20 March 2011, he announced his intention not to seek another term as Senator for the District of Ponce, deciding to run for a Senator At-large seat. This came as a result of the failure of a Senate bill, which he had authored, which would have ordered the Puerto Rico Buildings Authority to build a new vocational school in Ponce to replace the 60-year-old Escuela Superior Vocacional Bernardino Cordero Bernard.

On August 16, 2011, Seilhamer confirmed that he would seek reelection to the Senate in 2012, this time as a Senator At-large, and that he wouldn't challenge María "Mayita" Meléndez for Mayor of Ponce. During the 2012 general elections, Seilhamer was reelected despite the defeat of his party in most of the other seats. In addition, he was selected as the Minority Leader for the NPP delegation starting January 2, 2013.

On June 5, 2016, he was renominated for a second term as a senator at-large and for a third term as a member of the Senate.

On January 13, 2020, he resigned from the Senate effective January 15, 2020 citing his desire to spend more time with family, who lived in the southern city of Ponce and in the United States. His resignation was "irrevocable, final, and firm."

== Personal life ==
Seilhamer has four children with Linda Anadon. Their names are Dennis, David, Desiree and Debora. Debora (born on 1985) played for the USC Trojans volleyball team of the University of Southern California. She and her sister Desirée also played in the Puerto Rico Professional Volleyball League.

Senate of Puerto Rico
Preceded by Roberto Arango	Majority Leader of the Puerto Rico Senate; 2011–2013	Succeeded by Aníbal José Torres
Preceded by José Luis Dalmau	President pro tempore of the Puerto Rico Senate; 2017–2020	Succeeded by Henry Neumann
Political offices
Preceded by Raúl Márquez Hernández	Secretary of State of Puerto Rico; 2021	Succeeded by Félix Rivera Torres; Acting
