= Jorge Suárez Cáceres =

Senator of Puerto Rico

Member of the Puerto Rico Senate from the at-large district
- In office 2008–2013

Member of the Puerto Rico Senate from the Humacao district
- In office 2006–2008; 2013–2017

Personal details
- Born: August 24, 1976 (age 50) Fajardo, Puerto Rico
- Party: Popular Democratic Party
- Spouse(s): Nahomi Castro (former), Marisol Aguilu (actual, no children)
- Children: 2
- Education: Interamerican University of Puerto Rico (BA)
- Profession: Politician

Jorge Suárez Cáceres (Note: In this Spanish name, the first or paternal surname is Suárez and the second or maternal family name is Cáceres.) (born August 24, 1976, in Fajardo, Puerto Rico) is a Puerto Rican politician and senator. He has been a member of the Senate of Puerto Rico since 2006.

== Early years and studies ==
Jorge Suárez Cáceres was born on August 24, 1976, in Fajardo, Puerto Rico, to Ismael Suárez and Aurea Cáceres. He is the oldest of three siblings.

Suárez studied in the Eugenio Brac Elementary School of Naguabo, and finished his studies in his hometown of Humacao, at the San Benito and San Antonio Abad schools, graduating in 1994. Suárez obtained his bachelor's degree in political science from the Interamerican University of Puerto Rico Recinto Metropolitano, graduating cum laude.

During his youth, Suárez worked for a long time administering a gas station that belonged to his grandfather. He was also involved in Little Leagues in sports like basketball and baseball.

== Political career ==
Suárez began his political career working as an aide to Representative Ferdinand Pérez, and advisor to Senator José Luis Dalmau and to Resident Commissioner Aníbal Acevedo Vilá. He was also Director of the Transportation Area of the Governor's Office

In September 2005, he started working as Regional Director of the Housing Department in Humacao.

=== District Senator: 2006–2008 ===
Suárez Cáceres decided to run for the position of District Senator, to fill the vacancy left by Sixto Hernández. On July 16, 2006, he was elected by his party and was sworn in on August 31, 2006. Another candidate, Sara Irizarry, presented a motion after July 16, to nullify the voting claiming there were irregularities in the process, but the motion was dismissed.

With 30 years at the moment, Suárez became the youngest Senator of that term, and the second youngest to be sworn in the Senate in Puerto Rico. He has served as Speaker of his party in the Commissions of Commerce, Tourism, Urban Development, and Infrastructure; in the Joint Commission of Legislative Donations; and was also a member of several other commissions.

=== Senator At-large: 2009–2013 ===
Suárez was sworn in for a second term on June 29, 2009, this time according to the Minority Law of Puerto Rico, to complete the delegation of nine senators for his party.

== Honors and recognitions ==
Suárez has received several honors during his career. The Puerto Rico Chapter of the United Nations recognized his contributions to the discussion of international matters. Also, the Comptroller's Office in Puerto Rico gave him a recognition for having a "100% healthy administration" in his office.

During August 2008, he was honored by the Puerto Rican community in the State of New Jersey as the youngest senator of Puerto Rico, declaring him Grand Marshal of the Puerto Rican parade during the Puerto Rican week on that state. He received a recognition from Thomas DeGise, County Executive of Hudson County, New Jersey.
