= Tony Fas Alzamora =

Puerto Rican politician (born 1948)

Tony J. Fas Alzamora
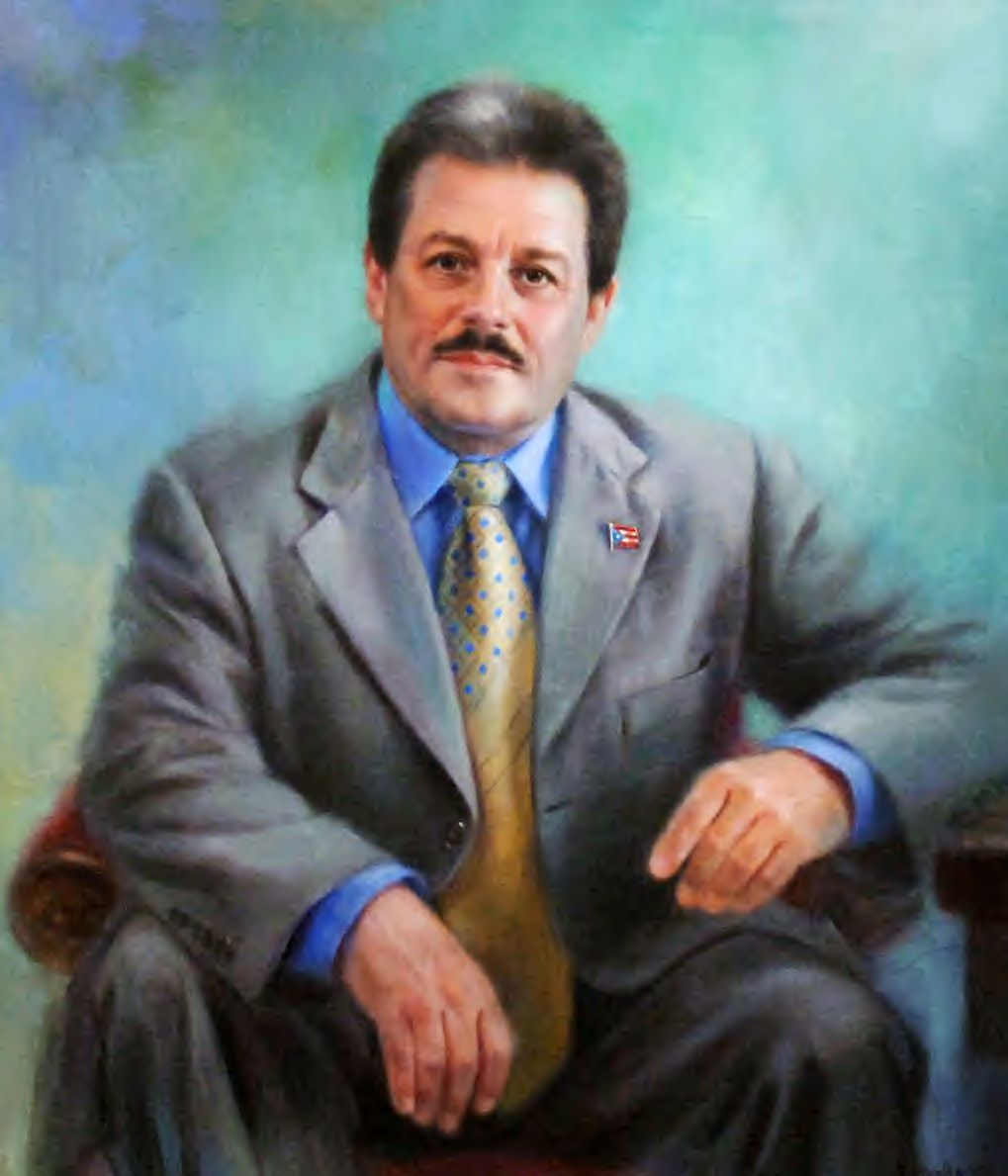

Member of the Puerto Rico Senate from the at-large district
- In office June 3, 2000 – December 31, 2016

12th President of the Senate of Puerto Rico
- In office January 1, 2001 – January 1, 2005
- Governor: Sila Calderón
- Preceded by: Charlie Rodríguez
- Succeeded by: Kenneth McClintock

Minority Leader of the Senate of Puerto Rico
- In office January 1, 1993 – January 1, 2001
- Succeeded by: Kenneth McClintock

Member of the Puerto Rico Senate from the Mayagüez district
- In office 3 August 1981 – 1 December 2000

Member of the Puerto Rico House of Representatives for District 20
- In office December 8, 1977 – December 11, 1980
- Preceded by: Jorge Alberto Ramos Comas
- Succeeded by: Harry Luis Pérez

Personal details
- Born: Antonio Fas Alzamora; November 16, 1948 (age 76); Cabo Rojo, Puerto Rico
- Political party: Popular Democratic Party
- Spouse: Ileana Pacheco Morales
- Education: University of Puerto Rico at Mayagüez (BA); Pontifical Catholic University of Puerto Rico School of Law (JD)
- Profession: Politician; attorney

Antonio "Tony" J. Fas Alzamora (born November 16, 1948) is a Puerto Rican politician and Senator. As of 31 December 2011, he was the longest-serving legislator in the history of Puerto Rico, having served in ten Legislative Assemblies, one House of Representatives (from 1977 to 1980), and nine Senates (since 1980).

== Early years and studies ==
Antonio Fas Alzamora was born on November 16, 1948, in Cabo Rojo, Puerto Rico to farmer Chaibén J. Fas Fagundo and teacher and housewife Margarita Alzamora Brunet. He finished his elementary and high school at Academia de la Inmaculada Concepción in Mayagüez. He then began his college studies at the University of Puerto Rico at Mayagüez. In 1970, he received his bachelor's degree in natural sciences with a major in biology. Earned a Juris Doctor from the Pontifical Catholic University of Puerto Rico School of Law in Ponce, Puerto Rico.

In March 1973, Fas Alzamora passed the bar exam and began working as an attorney after establishing his own law firm in Cabo Rojo.

== Political career ==
=== Representative: 1976–1979 ===
Fas Alzamora officially began his political career with the Popular Democratic Party (PPD). In 1976, he was elected to the Puerto Rico House of Representatives for District 20. Two years later, he was also elected as president of the PPD for the District and became a member of the Board.

=== District Senator: 1980–1995 ===
After serving in the House of Representatives from 1976 to 1979, representing his native Cabo Rojo, Puerto Rico, Fas Alzamora was elected to the Senate of Puerto Rico in 1980, representing the District of Mayagüez. He was reelected in 1984, 1988 and 1992.

In 1985, he was also appointed as Secretary General of the Popular Democratic Party. He fulfilled those duties, simultaneously with his work as Senator, until 1989. During those terms, he also presided over the Commission of Tourism, Youth, Sports and Recreation. In 1993, he was also appointed as Minority Speaker for his party.

=== At-large Senator: 1996–2016 ===
In the year 1996, he was elected as Senator at-large for the first time. He also continued serving as Minority Speaker in the Senate. Fas Alzamora was reelected in 2000, being the senatorial candidate from the PPD with most votes. He was elected unanimously in January, 2001, as the twelfth President of the Senate of Puerto Rico, a post he held until 2004. During this time, he chose Velda González as his President pro tempore. According to Fas Alzamora's biography at the Senate's website, during his presidency, the Senate approved more projects and laws than any other Senate.

He was reelected in 2004 as Senator at-large, but his party's delegation size dropped from 18 to 9, becoming the principal minority party in the Senate. He relinquished the delegation's leadership to Senator José Luis Dalmau, who now serves as Minority Leader after having served as Fas' Majority Leader.

In 2008, Fas Alzamora was elected to his eight term at the Senate and the ninth in the Legislature, tying the record previously set by Rep. Leopoldo Figueroa.

When he was sworn into his 10th consecutive term in the Legislature on January 2, 2013, he became the longest serving legislator in Puerto Rico's history, and was honored as such during the Senate's swearing-in ceremony.

Fas Alzamora retired in 2016, when he opted against running for re-election.

== Personal life ==
Fas Alzamora is married to Ileana Pacheco Morales, a licensed medical laboratory scientist. They have three children: Ileana Isabel, Antonio Juan, and Marilea. Ileana Fas served as Director of the Management and Budget Office of the Government of Puerto Rico.

== See also ==
- University of Puerto Rico at Mayaguez people

Senate of Puerto Rico
Preceded by Aníbal Marrero Pérez	Minority Whip of the Puerto Rico Senate; 1993–1996	Succeeded by Velda González
Preceded by Miguel Hernández Agosto	Minority Leader of the Puerto Rico Senate; 1997–2001	Succeeded by Kenneth McClintock
Political offices
Preceded by Charlie Rodríguez	President of the Puerto Rico Senate; 2001–2004	Succeeded by Kenneth McClintock
House of Representatives of Puerto Rico
Preceded by Jorge Alberto Ramos Comas	Member of the Puerto Rico House of Representatives from the 20th District; 1977–1980	Succeeded by Harry Luis Pérez
