= Puerto Rico senatorial district I =

Profile and election results

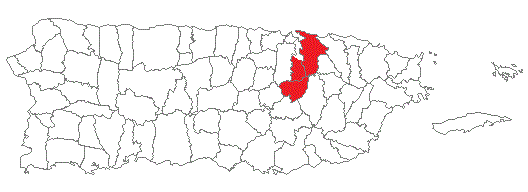
Map of Puerto Rico, highlighting senatorial district I

Puerto Rico senatorial district I, also known as the senatorial district of San Juan, is one of the eight senatorial districts of Puerto Rico. It is currently represented by Nitza Morán and Juan Oscar Morales (from the New Progressive Party).

== District profile ==
Senatorial district I covers all of the capital city of San Juan, as well as Aguas Buenas, and some regions of Guaynabo. It has an approximate population of 462,035.

In previous distributions, the territory covered by senatorial district I has changed. Originally, the district only covered the capital city of San Juan. In the 1983 redistribution, the San Juan sector of Sabana Llana was assigned to the district of Carolina, but was reassigned to San Juan again in 1991.

In the 2002 redistribution, some regions of Guaynabo were assigned to the district, and in the most recent redistribution (2011), the municipality of Aguas Buenas was also assigned to the district.

== Election results ==
=== 2016 ===
Puerto Rican general election, 2016
Party	Candidate	Votes	%	±%
New Progressive Party (PNP)	Henry Neumann	82,541	25.0	—
New Progressive Party (PNP)	Miguel Romero	80,844	24.5	—
Popular Democratic Party (PPD)	Ramón Luis Nieves	66,544	20.2	—
Popular Democratic Party (PPD)	Ada Álvarez Conde	66,368	20.1	—
Puerto Rican Independence Party (PIP)	Edda I. López Serrano	10,681	3.2	—
Puerto Rican Independence Party (PIP)	Ángel L. (Luigi) Alicea Montañez	10,519	3.2	—
Worker's People Party of Puerto Rico (PPT)	Maritza Stanchich	6,823	2.1	—
Worker's People Party of Puerto Rico (PPT)	María Gisela Rosado Almedina	5,771	1.7	—
Total votes		330,091	100	

=== 2012 ===
Puerto Rican general election, 2012
Party	Candidate	Votes	%	±%
Popular Democratic Party (PPD)	José Nadal Power	98,225	24.69	—
Popular Democratic Party (PPD)	Ramón Luis Nieves	96,378	24.22	—
New Progressive Party (PNP)	Zoé Laboy	90,102	22.64	—
New Progressive Party (PNP)	Liza Fernández	88,633	22.27	—
Puerto Rican Independence Party (PIP)	Héctor J. González Pereira	7,530	1.89	+0.35
Puerto Rican Independence Party (PIP)	Angel Alicea Montañez	6,969	1.75	—
Worker's People Party of Puerto Rico (PPT)	José "Pepe" Córdova	3,646	0.92	—
Movimiento Unión Soberanista (MUS)	Isabel Borrás Marín	3,310	0.83	—
Puerto Ricans for Puerto Rico Party (PPR)	Fred Guillont Juarbe	877	0.22	—
Total votes		397,907	100	

=== 2008 ===
Puerto Rican general election, 2008
Party	Candidate	Votes	%	±%
New Progressive Party (PNP)	Roberto Arango	99,652	24.89%	+0.67
New Progressive Party (PNP)	Kimmey Raschke	98,897	24.71	—
Popular Democratic Party (PPD)	José Ortíz	88,781	22.18	—
Popular Democratic Party (PPD)	Pedro Juan Figueroa	86,252	21.55	—
Puerto Ricans for Puerto Rico Party (PPR)	Moisés Tollinchi Padilla	6,672	1.67	—
Puerto Rican Independence Party (PIP)	Jorge Fernández Porto	6,205	1.55	-1.39
Puerto Rican Independence Party (PIP)	Héctor J. González Pereira	6,156	1.54	—
Puerto Ricans for Puerto Rico Party (PPR)	Orlando Nieves Rubio	5,650	1.41	—
Total votes		400,302	100.0	

=== 2004 ===
Puerto Rican general election, 2004
Party	Candidate	Votes	%	±%
New Progressive Party (PNP)	Roberto Arango	101,576	24.22%	—
New Progressive Party (PNP)	Carlos Díaz	100,657	24.00	—
Popular Democratic Party (PPD)	Margarita Ostolaza	96,373	22.98	-0.52
Popular Democratic Party (PPD)	José Ortiz Dalliot	93,673	22.34	-0.56
Puerto Rican Independence Party (PIP)	Jessica Martínez Birriel	12,966	3.09	—
Puerto Rican Independence Party (PIP)	Jorge Fernández Porto	12,315	2.94	—
Total votes		419,370	100.0	
