= Puerto Rico senatorial district VIII =

Profile and election results

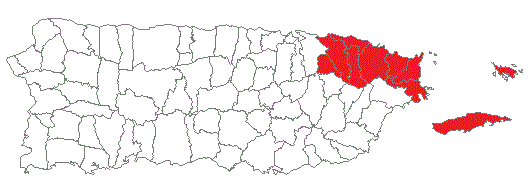
Map of Puerto Rico, highlighting senatorial district VIII

Puerto Rico senatorial district VIII, also known as the senatorial district of Carolina, is one of the eight senatorial districts of Puerto Rico. It is currently represented by Javier Aponte Dalmau from the Popular Democratic Party and Marissa Jimenez from the New Progressive Party.

== District profile ==
Senatorial district VIII has an approximate population of 465,427. It covers the following municipalities:

- Canóvanas
- Carolina
- Ceiba
- Culebra
- Fajardo
- Loíza
- Luquillo
- Río Grande
- Trujillo Alto
- Vieques

In previous distributions, the territory covered by senatorial district VIII has changed. In 1983, the district didn't include the municipality of Ceiba and included the Sabana Llana region of San Juan. In the 1991 redistribution, Ceiba was reassigned to the district of Guayama, while the Sabana Llana region was reassigned to the district of San Juan.

The district hasn't suffered changes in the recent redistributions of 2002 and 2011.

== Election results ==
=== 2012 ===
Puerto Rican general election, 2012
Party	Candidate	Votes	%	±%
Popular Democratic Party (PPD)	Pedro A. Rodríguez	101,391	25.53	—
Popular Democratic Party (PPD)	Luis Daniel Rivera	100,080	25.20	—
New Progressive Party (PNP)	Lornna Soto	91,216	22.97	-1.88
New Progressive Party (PNP)	Roger Iglesias	86,584	21.80	-1.10
Puerto Rican Independence Party (PIP)	Pedro José "Pepe" Alvarez	5,378	1.35	-1.75
Puerto Rican Independence Party (PIP)	Dwight Rodríguez Orta	5,302	1.34	+0.36
Movimiento Unión Soberanista (MUS)	Guillermo Sosa Rodríguez	2,217	0.56	—
Puerto Ricans for Puerto Rico Party (PPR)	Fabiola Carrasquillo	1,309	0.33	-1.46
Puerto Ricans for Puerto Rico Party (PPR)	Edwin M. González	1,134	0.29	—
Total votes		397,097	100	

=== 2008 ===
Puerto Rican general election, 2008
Party	Candidate	Votes	%	±%
New Progressive Party (PNP)	Lornna Soto	105,008	24.85%	+0.19
New Progressive Party (PNP)	Héctor Martínez	103,824	24.57	+0.23
Popular Democratic Party (PPD)	Javier Aponte Dalmau	95,038	22.49	—
Popular Democratic Party (PPD)	Nazario Lugo	93,398	22.10	—
Puerto Ricans for Puerto Rico Party (PPR)	Fabiola Carrasquillo	7,585	1.79	—
Puerto Ricans for Puerto Rico Party (PPR)	Brian P. Deese	7,094	1.68	—
Puerto Rican Independence Party (PIP)	Dwight Rodríguez Orta	4,158	0.98	-2.02
Puerto Rican Independence Party (PIP)	Juan J. Rivera	4,025	0.95	—
Total votes		422,586	100.0	

=== 2004 ===
Puerto Rican general election, 2004
Party	Candidate	Votes	%	±%
New Progressive Party (PNP)	Lornna Soto	106,272	24.66%	—
New Progressive Party (PNP)	Héctor Martínez	104,905	24.34	—
Popular Democratic Party (PPD)	Yasmín Mejías	100,581	23.34	-0.76
Popular Democratic Party (PPD)	Juan Cancel Alegría	96,537	22.40	-1.10
Puerto Rican Independence Party (PIP)	Carmen Texeira	8,989	2.09	—
Puerto Rican Independence Party (PIP)	Paco Abreu	8,666	2.01	—
Independent	Ebenecer López Ruyol	2,936	0.68	—
Total votes		431,009	100.0	
