= 27th Senate of Puerto Rico =

Session of the Puerto Rico Legislature

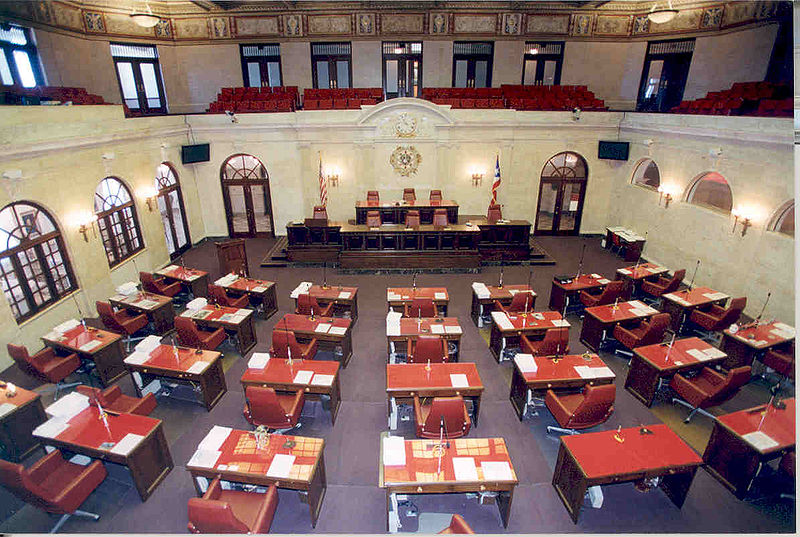

In session
- January 2, 2021 – January 1, 2025

Leadership
- President: José Luis Dalmau
- President pro tem: Marially González Huertas
- Majority Leader: Javier Aponte Dalmau
- Majority Whip: Gretchen Hau
- Minority Leaders: Thomas Rivera Schatz; Ana Irma Rivera Lassén; Juan Dalmau; Vargas Vidot; Joanne Rodríguez Veve
- Minority Whips: Carmelo Ríos Santiago; Rafael Bernabe Riefkohl

Non-officers
- Secretary: Yamil Rivera Vélez
- Sergeant-at-Arms: Javier Torres Rodríguez

Structure
- Seats: 27 voting members
- Parties represented: 12 PPD; 10 PNP; 2 MVC; 1 PIP; 1 PD; 1 Ind.
- Length of term: 4 years

Elections
- Last election: November 8, 2020
- Next election: November 5, 2024

Legislature
- 19th Legislative Assembly of Puerto Rico

Lower house
- 31st House of Representatives of Puerto Rico

Sessions
- 1st: January 11, 2021 – June 30, 2021
- 2nd: August 16, 2021 – November 16, 2021
- 3rd: January 10, 2022 – June 30, 2022
- 4th: August 15, 2022 – November 15, 2022
- 5th: January 9, 2023 – June 30, 2023
- 6th: August 21, 2023 – November 14, 2023
- 7th: January 8, 2024 – June 30, 2024
- 8th: August 19, 2024* – November 19, 2024*

The 27th Senate of Puerto Rico was the upper house of the 19th Legislative Assembly of Puerto Rico. Its counterpart in the lower house was the 31st House of Representatives of Puerto Rico.

The body met from January 2, 2021 to January 1, 2025 under the Federal Oversight and Management Board established by PROMESA.

The 27th Senate featured a return to the standard composition of the body, with the number of senators decreasing to 27 from 30 in the 26th Senate of Puerto Rico, in accordance to Article III, Section 7, Constitution of Puerto Rico, 1952. For the first time in the Constitutional period starting in 1952, there was no clear majority party for the body, with the plurality coming from the Popular Democratic Party (PPD in Spanish) at 12 seats of the 14 needed to have a majority when the body is at 27 members.

The body was counterparted by the 31st House of Representatives of Puerto Rico in the lower house. It has given advice and consent to the nominees put forth by Pedro Pierluisi.

== Leadership ==
=== Current leadership ===
PPD PNP PIP MVC PD
Office	Senator	District	Party
President	José Luis Dalmau Santiago	At-large	PPD
President pro tempore	Marially González Huertas	District V – Ponce	PPD
Majority Leader	Javier Antonio Aponte Dalmau	District VIII – Carolina	PPD
Majority Whip	Gretchen Marie Hau Irizarry	District VI – Guayama	PPD
Minority Leader – PNP	Thomas Rivera Schatz	At-large	PNP
Minority Whip – PNP	Carmelo Ríos Santiago	District II – Bayamón	PPD
Minority Leader – MVC	Ana Irma Rivera Lassén	At-large	MVC
Minority Whip – MVC	Rafael Bernabe Riefkohl	At-large	MVC
Minority Leader – PIP	María de Lourdes Santiago	At-large	PIP
Minority Leader – PD	Joanne Rodríguez Veve	At-large	PD
Minority Leader	José "Chaco" Vargas Vidot	At-large	Independent

=== Vote for President of the Senate ===
Senatorial presidential election José Luis Dalmau Santiago (PPD)
Ballot →	11 January 2021
Required majority →	14 out of 27
Yes: • PPD (12); • PD (1); • Independent (1)	14 / 27
No: • No parties or delegations voted against.	0 / 27
Abstentions: • PNP (10); • MVC (2); • PIP (1)	13 / 27
Absentees: • No absences.	0 / 350

== Members ==
PPD PNP PIP MVC PD
District	Name	Affiliation
District I San Juan	Juan O. Morales Rodríguez	PNP
District I San Juan	Nitza Morán Trinidad	PNP
District II Bayamón	Migdalia Padilla	PNP
District II Bayamón	Carmelo Ríos Santiago	PNP
District III Arecibo	Elizabeth Rosa Vélez	PPD
District III Arecibo	Rubén Soto Rivera	PPD
District IV Mayagüez–Aguadilla	Ada García Montes	PPD
District IV Mayagüez–Aguadilla	Migdalia González Arroyo	PPD
District V Ponce	Marially González Huertas	PPD
District V Ponce	Ramón Ruiz Nieves	PPD
District VI Guayama	Héctor Santiago Torres	PPD
District VI Guayama	Albert Torres Berríos	PPD
District VII Humacao	Rosamar Trujillo Plumey	PPD
District VII Humacao	Wanda Soto Tolentino	PNP
District VIII Carolina	Javier Aponte Dalmau	PPD
District VIII Carolina	Marissa Jiménez Santoni	PNP
At-large	Thomas Rivera Schatz	PNP
At-large	William Villafañe Ramos	PNP
At-large	Gregorio Matías Rosario	PNP
At-large	Keren Riquelme Cabrera	PNP
At-large	Juan Zaragoza Gómez	PPD
At-large	José Dalmau Santiago	PPD
At-large	Ana Irma Rivera Lassén	MVC
At-large	Rafael Bernabe Riefkohl	MVC
At-large	María de Lourdes Santiago Negrón	PIP
At-large	Joanne Rodríguez Veve	PD
At-large	José Vargas Vidot	Independent

== Non-officers ==
PPD
Post	Name	Political party
Secretary	Yamil Rivera Vélez	PPD
Sergeant-at-Arms	Javier Torres Rodríguez (Note: Senate (2022) "Sesión Ordinaria, día 64")	PPD

== Commissions ==
A notable departure from previous senates is the addition of more commission presidencies from outside the largest party in the chamber. While the 26th Senate had an independent senator as president of the Commission for the Development of Community Initiatives, José Vargas Vidot, this current body assigned one commission presidency to each delegation, as may be better seen in this table of standing commissions.

=== Standing and Special Commissions ===
PPD PNP PIP MVC PD Ind.
Name	President	Vice President	Secretary
Agriculture and Natural Resources	José Luis Dalmau Santiago	Ada García Montes	Ramón Ruiz Nieves
Appointments	José Luis Dalmau Santiago	Gretchen Marie Hau Irizarry	Rubén Soto Rivera
Compliance and Restructuring	Marially González Huertas	Rosamar Trujillo Plumey	Ada García Montes
Cooperativism	Rosamar Trujillo Plumey	Gretchen Marie Hau Irizarry	Migdalia González Arroyo
Community Initiatives, Mental Health, and Addiction	José Vargas Vidot	Rosamar Trujillo Plumey	Elizabeth Rosa Vélez
Development of the East Region	Rosamar Trujillo Plumey	Javier Aponte Dalmau	Albert Torres Berríos
Development of the North Region	Rubén Soto Rivera	Elizabeth Rosa Vélez	Albert Torres Berríos
Development of the South Central Region	Ramón Ruiz Nieves	Marially González Huertas	Albert Torres Berríos
Development of the West Region	Migdalia González Arroyo	Ada García Montes	Rubén Soto Rivera
Economic Development, Essential Public Services, and Consumer Affairs	Gretchen Marie Hau Irizarry	Ada García Montes	Juan Zaragoza Gómez
Education, Tourism, and Culture	Ada García Montes	Elizabeth Rosa Vélez	Albert Torres Berríos
Ethics	Gretchen Marie Hau Irizarry	Marially González Huertas	Ramón Ruiz Nieves
Government	Ramón Ruiz Nieves	Juan Zaragoza Gómez	Albert Torres Berríos
Health	Rubén Soto Rivera	Rosamar Trujillo Plumey	Ada García Montes
Human Rights and Labor Affairs	Ana Irma Rivera Lassén	Gretchen Marie Hau Irizarry	Rubén Soto Rivera
Innovation, Telecommunication, Urbanism and Infrastructure	Elizabeth Rosa Vélez	Albert Torres Berríos	Ramón Ruiz Nieves
Internal Affairs	Marially González Huertas	Javier Aponte Dalmau	Migdalia González Arroyo
Life and Family Affairs	Joanne Rodríguez Veve	Elizabeth Rosa Vélez	Rosamar Trujillo Plumey
Municipal Affairs and Housing	Migdalia González Arroyo	Gretchen Marie Hau Irizarry	Ramón Ruiz Nieves
Poverty Eradication	Elizabeth Rosa Vélez	Rosamar Trujillo Plumey	Migdalia González Arroyo
Public Safety and Veteran Affairs	Thomas Rivera Schatz (PNP)	Albert Torres Berríos	Juan Zaragoza Gómez
Rules and Calendar	Javier Aponte Dalmau	Gretchen Marie Hau Irizarry	Ada García Montes
Social Welfare and Elderly Affairs	Rosamar Trujillo Plumey	Elizabeth Rosa Vélez	Migdalia González Arroyo
Treasury, Federal Relations, and the Oversight Board	Juan Zaragoza Gómez	Ramón Ruiz Nieves	Ada García Montes
Veterans' Affairs	José Luis Dalmau	Zoé Laboy Alvarado	Carlos J. Rodríguez Mateo
Women's Affairs	Migdalia González Arroyo	Elizabeth Rosa Vélez	Gretchen Marie Hau Irizarry
Youth, Recreation and Sports	Albert Torres Berríos	Ada García Montes	Gretchen Marie Hau Irizarry
Special Commission on Legislative Monitoring of the Special Education Program of the Department of Education	Mª de Lourdes Santiago Negrón		
Special Commission on Poverty Eradication	Elizabeth Rosa Vélez	Rosamar Trujillo Plumey	Migdalia González Arroyo
