= 28th Senate of Puerto Rico =

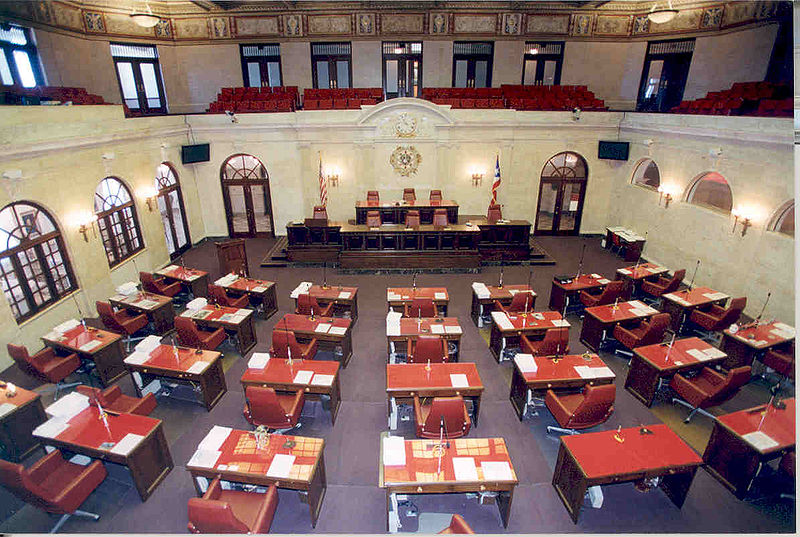

In session
- January 2, 2025 – January 1, 2029

Leadership
- President: Thomas Rivera Schatz
- President pro tem: Carmelo Ríos Santiago; Marissa Jiménez Santoni
- Majority Leader: Gregorio Matías Rosario
- Majority Whip: Juan Oscar Morales Rodríguez
- Minority Leaders: Luis Javier Hernández Ortiz; María de Lourdes Santiago
- Minority Whips: Marially González Huertas; Adrián González Costa

Structure
- Seats: 28 voting members
- Parties represented: 19 PNP; 5 PPD; 2 PIP; 2 Ind.
- Length of term: 4 years

Elections
- Last election: November 5, 2024
- Next election: November 7, 2028

Legislature
- 20th Legislative Assembly of Puerto Rico

Lower house
- 32nd House of Representatives of Puerto Rico

Sessions

The 28th Senate of Puerto Rico is the current session of the Senate of Puerto Rico, and the upper house of the 20th Legislative Assembly of Puerto Rico. The 28th Senate convened on January 2, 2025, and will adjourn on January 1, 2029.

== Leadership ==
=== Current leadership ===
PPD PNP PIP
Office	Senator	District	Party
President	Thomas Rivera Schatz	At-large	PNP
First president pro tempore	Carmelo Ríos Santiago	District II – Bayamón	PNP
Second president pro tempore	Marissa Jiménez Santoni	District VIII – Carolina	PNP
Majority Leader	Gregorio Matías Rosario	At-large	PNP
Majority Whip	Juan Oscar Morales Rodríguez	District I – San Juan	PNP
Minority Leader – PPD	Luis Javier Hernández Ortiz	At-large	PPD
Minority Whip – PPD	Marially González Huertas	District V – Ponce	PPD
Minority Leader – PIP	María de Lourdes Santiago	At-large	PIP
Minority Whip – PIP	Adrián González Costa	At-large	PIP

== Members ==
PPD PNP PIP
District	Name	Party
I San Juan	Juan Morales Rodríguez	PNP
I San Juan	Nitza Morán	PNP
II; Bayamón	Migdalia Padilla	PNP
II; Bayamón	Carmelo Ríos Santiago	PNP
III; Arecibo	Brenda Pérez Soto	PNP
III; Arecibo	Héctor González López	PNP
IV; Mayagüez–Aguadilla	Karen Román Rodríguez	PNP
IV; Mayagüez–Aguadilla	Jeison Rosa Ramos	PNP
V Ponce	Marially González Huertas	PPD
V Ponce	Jamie Barlucea Rodríguez	PNP
VI; Guayama	Wilmer Reyes Berríos	PNP
VI; Guayama	Rafael Santos Ortiz	PNP
VII; Humacao	Wanda Soto Tolentino	PNP
VII; Humacao	Luis Colón La Santa	PNP
VIII; Carolina	Marissa Jiménez Santoni	PNP
VIII; Carolina	Héctor Sánchez Álvarez	PNP
At-large	Thomas Rivera Schatz	PNP
At-large	Gregorio Matías Rosario	PNP
At-large	Ángel Toledo López	PNP
At-large	Roxanna Soto Aguilú	PNP
At-large	Javier Hernández Ortiz	PPD
At-large	José Luis Dalmau	PPD
At-large	José Santiago Rivera	PPD
At-large	Ada Álvarez Conde	PPD
At-large	María de Lourdes Santiago	PIP
At-large	Adrián González Costa	PIP
At-large	Joanne Rodríguez Veve	Independent
At-large	Eliezer Molina Pérez	Independent
