= 2024 Puerto Rico Senate election =

2024 Puerto Rico Senate elections
- November 5, 2024

All 27 seats in the Senate of Puerto Rico 14 seats needed for a majority
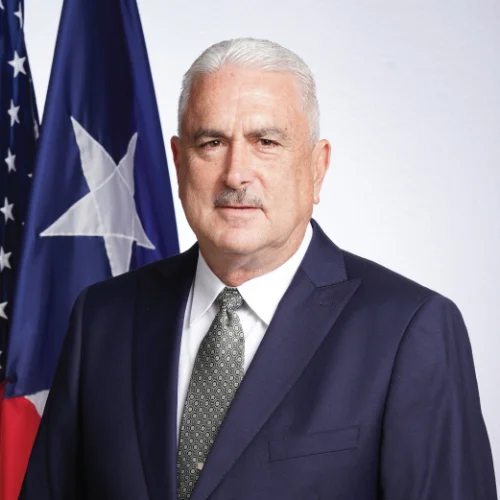

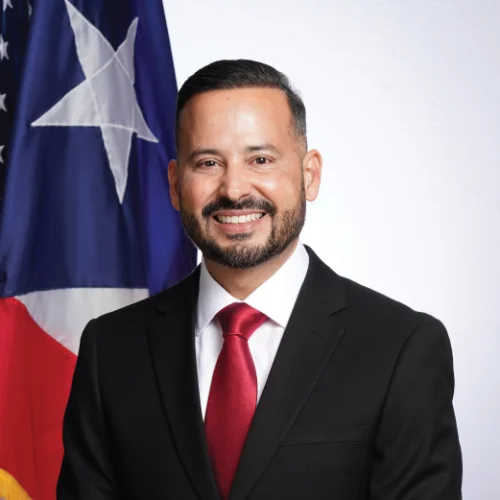

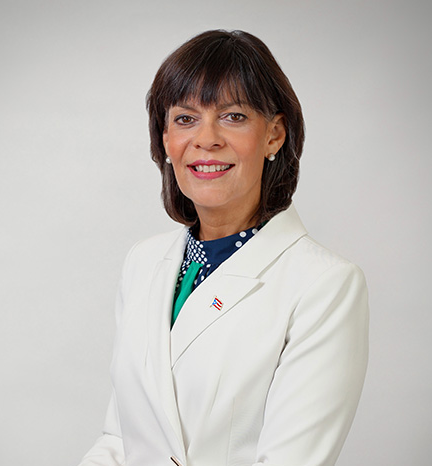

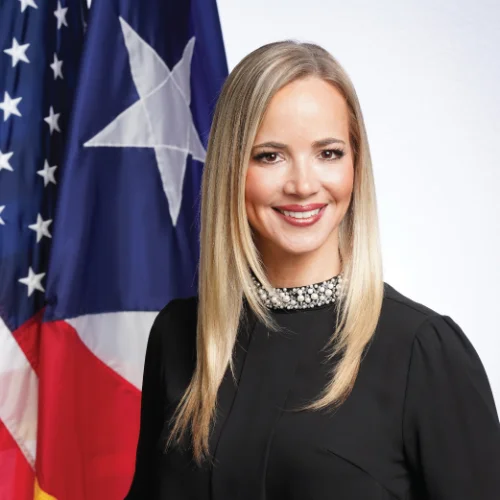

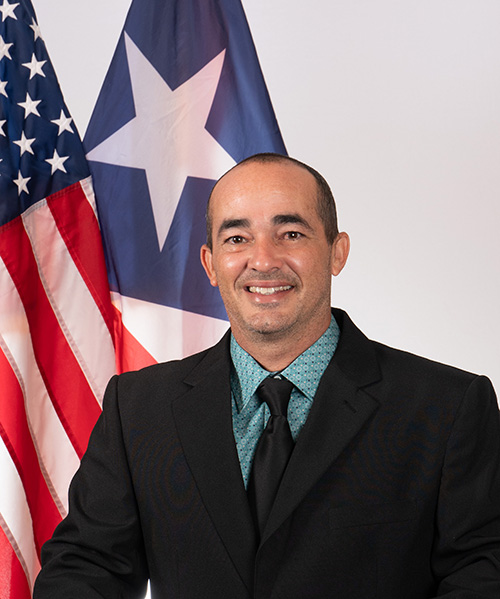

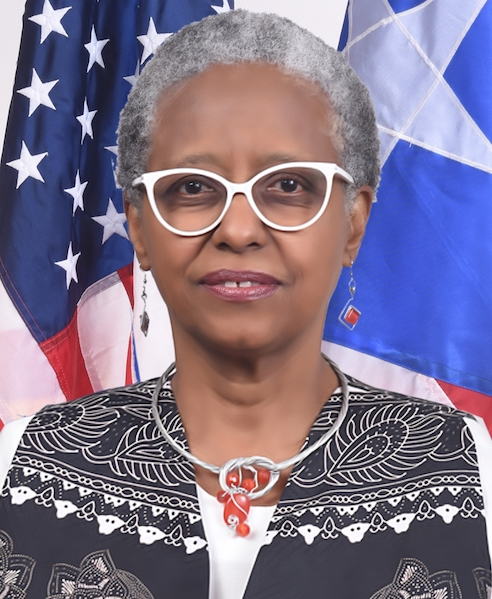
	Majority party	Minority party	Third party
Leader	Thomas Rivera Schatz	Luis Javier Hernández Ortiz	María de Lourdes Santiago
Party	New Progressive	Popular Democratic	Independence
Leader since	January 2, 2017	January 2, 2025	January 2, 2021
Seats before	10	12	1
Seats after	19	5	2 (Note: The numbers of legislators in this senate increased from 27 to 28, because the New Progressive Party (PNP) won 19 of the 27 seats in contention, surpassing the two-thirds limit (18 seats). This automatically triggered Article Three of the Constitution of Puerto Rico which mandates that in such case new seats must be open for minority legislators. These new seats account for the number of seats the majority party surpassed (1 seat in this election).)
Seat change	▲9	▼7	▲1
	Fourth party	Fifth party	Sixth party
Leader	Joanne Rodríguez Veve	Eliezer Molina (write-in)	Ana Irma Rivera Lassén (Note: Ran for Resident Commissioner)
Party	Project Dignity	Independent	Citizens' Victory
Leader since	January 2, 2021	—	January 2, 2021
Seats before	1	1 (Note: Vargas Vidot)	2
Seats after	1	1	0
Seat change	Steady	Steady	▼2
President of the Senate before election
José Dalmau Santiago
Popular Democratic
Elected President of the Senate
Thomas Rivera Schatz
New Progressive

The 2024 Puerto Rico Senate election was held on November 5, 2024, to elect the members of the 28th Senate of Puerto Rico, concurrently with the election of the Governor, the Resident Commissioner, the House of Representatives, and the mayors of the 78 municipalities, as well as the election events of a status referendum and a presidential straw poll. As candidates in the 2024 general elections, the winners were elected to serve a four-year term from January 2, 2025 to January 2, 2029.

This was the first Puerto Rico Senate election with a successful write-in candidate, Eliezer Molina, who won one of the 11 at-large seats after receiving 71,254 votes.

== Summary ==
There were 77 candidates running for senator:

- New Progressive Party (PNP) had 22 candidates, 9 of whom were incumbent.
- Popular Democratic Party (PPD) had 20 candidates, 8 of whom were incumbent.
- Puerto Rican Independence Party (PIP) had 9 candidates, 1 of whom was incumbent.
- Citizen's Victory Movement (MVC) had 8 candidates.
- Project Dignity (PD) had 15 candidates, 1 of whom was incumbent.
- 3 candidates were independent, 1 of whom was incumbent.

== Senate composition ==
27th Senate of Puerto Rico (2021-2025)

PPD_{1}	PPD_{2}	PPD_{3}	PPD_{4}	PPD_{5}	PPD_{6}	PPD_{7}	PPD_{8}	PPD_{9}
PPD_{10}	PPD_{11}	PPD_{12}	MVC_{1}	MVC_{2}	PIP_{1}	PD_{1}	IND_{1}	PNP_{1}
PNP_{2}	PNP_{3}	PNP_{4}	PNP_{5}	PNP_{6}	PPD_{7}	PPD_{8}	PPD_{9}	PPD_{10}

28th Senate of Puerto Rico (2025-2029)

PNP_{1}	PNP_{2}	PNP_{3}	PNP_{4}	PNP_{5}	PNP_{6}	PPD_{7}	PPD_{8}	PPD_{9}
PNP_{10}	PNP_{11}	PNP_{12}	PNP_{13}	PNP_{14}	PNP_{15}	PNP_{16}	PNP_{17}	PNP_{18}
PNP_{19}	PPD_{1}	PPD_{2}	PPD_{3}	PPD_{4}	PPD_{5}	PIP_{1}	PIP_{2} (Note: Per Section 7, Article III of the Constitution of Puerto Rico, if a party wins a two-thirds majority (18 out of 27 seats) or more in the Senate, seats equal to the number of seats over the 18-seat threshold must be added to preserve the participation and representation of minority parties. Since the New Progressive Party (PNP) exceeded the threshold by one seat, the Puerto Rican Independence Party (PIP) was awarded one seat, selecting the candidate with the highest vote share won at-large or in a district.)	PD_{1}
IND_{1}

== Results ==
The final results of the 2024 Puerto Rico Senate election were certified on December 31, 2024, by the Puerto Rico State Commission (CEE).

=== Summary ===
Parties	District			At-large			Total seats	Composition	±%
Parties	Votes	%	Seats	Votes	%	Seats	Total seats	Composition	±%
New Progressive Party (PNP)	872,873	39.8	15	446,273	35.1	5	19	19 / 27	+9
Popular Democratic Party (PPD)	729,922	33.3	1	325,053	25.6	4	5	5 / 27	-7
Puerto Rican Independence Party (PIP)	198,590	9.1	0	178,575	14.0	1	1	1 / 27	–
Project Dignity (PD)	170,566	7.8	0	94,604	7.4	1	1	1 / 27	–
Independents	0	0	0	132,053	10.4	1	1	1 / 27	–
Citizen's Victory Movement (MVC)	156,795	7.2	0	0	0	0	0	0 / 27	-2
Total	2,192,800	100.00	16	1,271,361	100.00	11	27		

Left-of-center parties PIP and MVC formed an electoral alliance for the 2024 elections, called the Alianza de País. They agreed to only run one candidate per Senate district to maximize their opportunities.

=== Senate at-large ===
2024 Puerto Rico At-Large Senate Election
Party	Candidate	Votes	%	±%
Independence	María de Lourdes Santiago (incumbent)	178,575	14.0	+2.7
New Progressive	Thomas Rivera Schatz (incumbent)	100,001	7.9	+1.3
Project Dignity	Joanne Rodríguez Veve (incumbent)	94,604	7.4	+0.1
Popular Democratic	José Luis Dalmau (incumbent)	86,097	6.8	+0.9
Popular Democratic	Javy Hernandez	85,956	6.8	n/a
Popular Democratic	Josian Santiago	76,961	6.1	n/a
Popular Democratic	Ada Álvarez Conde	76,039	6.0	+1.2
New Progressive	Ángel Toledo López	72,368	5.7	n/a
Independent	Eliezer Molina Pérez (write-in)	71,254	5.6	n/a
New Progressive	Gregorio Matías (incumbent)	69,350	5.5	+0.1
New Progressive	Roxanna I. Soto Aguilú	69,010	5.4	n/a
New Progressive	Keren Riquelme (incumbent)	67,953	5.3	+0.1
New Progressive	Leyda Cruz	67,591	5.3	n/a
Independent	José Vargas Vidot (incumbent)	48,566	3.8	−2.0
Independent	Elizabeth Torres	10,191	0.8	n/a
Independent	Nelson R. Albino	2,042	0.2	n/a
Write-in		13,395	1.1	n/a
Total votes		1,271,361	100.0	
Independence hold				
New Progressive hold				
Project Dignity hold				
Popular Democratic hold				
Popular Democratic hold				
Popular Democratic gain from Independent				
Popular Democratic gain from Citizens' Victory				
New Progressive hold				
Independent hold				
New Progressive hold				
New Progressive gain from Citizens' Victory				

The Popular Democratic Party decided to nominate four candidates instead of six candidates like they normally do, claiming that this would help them win more overall at-large seats. Although the Citizen's Victory Movement originally planned to have two at-large candidates, these being incumbent senator Rafael Bernabe Riefkohl and newcomer Alejandro Santiago Calderón, their candidacies were invalidated by the Supreme Court for not having collected the necessary endorsements required by law.

=== Senate by District ===
==== I San Juan ====
2024 Puerto Rico San Juan District Election
Party	Candidate	Votes	%	±%
New Progressive	Nitza Morán (incumbent)	52,617	21.4	+4.8
New Progressive	Juan Oscar Morales	51,862	21.1	n/a
Independence	Adrián González Costa (Note: Elected under Article III of the Puerto Rico constitution, as an extra seat for minority parties.)	45,950	18.7	+13.0
Citizens' Victory	Rosa Seguí	41,856	16.9	+3.4
Popular Democratic	Ivonne Lozada	27,904	11.4	n/a
Popular Democratic	Gabriel Pérez Pérez	25,654	10.4	n/a
Total votes		245,843	100.0	
New Progressive hold				
New Progressive hold				

==== II Bayamón ====
2024 Bayamón District Election
Party	Candidate	Votes	%	±%
New Progressive	Carmelo Ríos Santiago (incumbent)	56,229	22.0	+1.3
New Progressive	Migdalia Padilla (incumbent)	56,106	22.0	+2.1
Citizens' Victory	Betito Márquez	36,920	14.5	N/A
Popular Democratic	Raquel Gauthier	29,520	11.6	N/A
Popular Democratic	Antonio Cruz Rodríguez	26,533	10.4	N/A
Independence	Noel Berríos Díaz	25,799	10.1	N/A
Project Dignity	César Vázquez Muñiz	12,331	4.8	N/A
Project Dignity	Lymari Ocasio Pérez	11,635	4.6	N/A
Total votes		255,073	100.0	
New Progressive hold				
New Progressive hold				

==== III Arecibo ====
2024 Arecibo District Election
Party	Candidate	Votes	%	±%
New Progressive	Brenda Pérez Soto	61,769	21.8	n/a
New Progressive	Gaby González	61,241	21.6	n/a
Popular Democratic	Elizabeth Rosa Vélez (incumbent)	51,119	18.0	−1.1
Popular Democratic	Ramón Luis Hernández Espino (incumbent)	50,808	17.9	−1.0
Independence	Taíra M. Barreto Canals	17,212	6.1	n/a
Project Dignity	Edwin Mieles Richard	14,850	5.2	n/a
Project Dignity	Mario Javier Rosario Maisonet	13,526	4.8	n/a
Citizens' Victory	Cristina Pérez	12,908	4.6	n/a
Total votes		283,433	100.0	
New Progressive gain from Popular Democratic				
New Progressive gain from Popular Democratic				

==== IV Mayagüez-Aguadilla ====
2024 Mayagüez-Aguadilla District Election
Party	Candidate	Votes	%	±%
New Progressive	Jeison "El Calvito" Rosa	57,015	20.1	n/a
New Progressive	Karen Michelle Román Rodríguez	56,985	20.1	n/a
Popular Democratic	Migdalia González (incumbent)	56,908	20.1	−0.7
Popular Democratic	Juan "Veguita" Vega	53,730	18.9	n/a
Independence	Julia Rita Rodríguez Sánchez	22,022	7.8	n/a
Project Dignity	José A. Bonilla Morales	14,505	5.1	n/a
Project Dignity	Raúl López Vergé	13,245	4.7	n/a
Citizens' Victory	Nil Matías	9,271	3.3	n/a
Total votes		283,661	100.0	
New Progressive gain from Popular Democratic				
New Progressive gain from Popular Democratic				

==== V Ponce ====
2024 Ponce District Election
Party	Candidate	Votes	%	±%
Popular Democratic	Migdalia González (incumbent)	67,122	21.9	+1.8
New Progressive	Jamie Barlucea	65,823	21.5	n/a
New Progressive	Jackie Rodríguez	64,074	20.9	n/a
Popular Democratic	Ramoncito Ruiz Nieves (incumbent)	62,263	20.3	+2.1
Independence	Justiniano Díaz	18,058	5.9	n/a
Project Dignity	Francisco Javier Rodríguez Napoleoni	9,899	3.2	n/a
Citizens' Victory	Ramón Rodríguez Ramos	9,791	3.2	n/a
Project Dignity	José Alberto Hernández Pagán	9,232	3.0	n/a
Total votes		306,262	100.0	
Popular Democratic hold				
New Progressive gain from Popular Democratic				

==== VI Guayama ====
2024 Guayama District Election
Party	Candidate	Votes	%	±%
New Progressive	Rafy Santos Ortiz	67,542	22.5	n/a
New Progressive	Wilmer Reyes Berríos	67,504	22.5	n/a
Popular Democratic	Albert Torres Berríos (incumbent)	56,356	18.8	−4.2
Popular Democratic	Héctor Santiago (incumbent)	55,761	18.6	n/a
Independence	Víctor Alvarado Guzmán	20,772	6.9	+2.4
Citizens' Victory	Luzmina Martínez Vera	15,393	5.1	n/a
Project Dignity	Verónica Rivera Lebrón	9,075	3.0	n/a
Project Dignity	Javier F. Concepción Vázquez	7,927	2.6	n/a
Total votes		300,330	100.0	
New Progressive gain from Popular Democratic				
New Progressive gain from Popular Democratic				

==== VII Humacao ====
2024 Humacao District Election
Party	Candidate	Votes	%	±%
New Progressive	Wanda Soto Tolentino (incumbent)	60,403	21.4	+2.4
New Progressive	Luis Daniel Colón La Santa	59,032	20.9	n/a
Popular Democratic	Nina Valedón	49,543	17.6	n/a
Popular Democratic	Luis Raúl Sánchez Hernández	46,404	16.4	n/a
Independence	Luis Domenech Sepúlveda	24,385	8.6	n/a
Project Dignity	Jennifer López Contreras	15,347	5.4	n/a
Citizens' Victory	Mayra Vicil Bernier	13,932	4.9	n/a
Project Dignity	Katherine Tirado Flores	13,050	4.6	n/a
Total votes		282,096	100.0	
New Progressive hold				
New Progressive gain from Popular Democratic				

==== VIII Carolina ====
2024 Carolina District Election
Party	Candidate	Votes	%	±%
New Progressive	Marissa Jiménez (incumbent)	51,897	22.0	+4.3
New Progressive	Héctor Joaquín Sánchez Álvarez	46,848	19.8	n/a
Popular Democratic	Enid Monge Ortiz	35,396	15.0	n/a
Popular Democratic	Frankie Guerra Morales	34,901	14.8	n/a
Independence	Dwight Rodríguez Delgado	24,392	10.3	n/a
Citizens' Victory	Daniel Lugo Mercado	16,724	7.1	n/a
Project Dignity	Eilleen Violeta Ramos Rivera	13,463	5.7	n/a
Project Dignity	David Ramón Matta Fontanet	12,481	5.3	n/a
Total votes		236,102	100.0	
New Progressive hold				
New Progressive gain from Popular Democratic				
