= 23rd Senate of Puerto Rico =

Session of the Puerto Rico Legislature

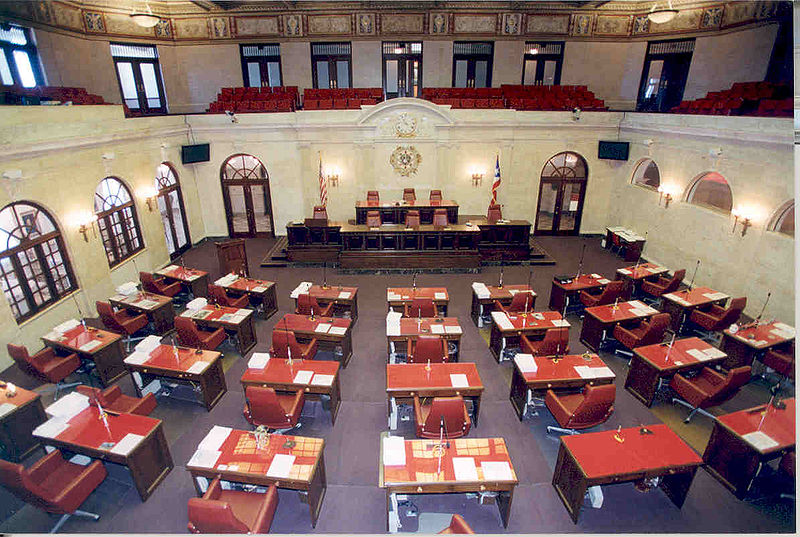

In session
- January 2, 2005 – January 1, 2009

Leadership
- President: Kenneth McClintock
- President pro tem: Orlando Parga
- Majority Leader: Margarita Nolasco
- Majority Whip: Carlos Pagán
- Minority Leader: José Luis Dalmau
- Minority Whip: Sila Mari González

Structure
- Seats: 27 voting members
- Parties represented: PNP; PPD; PIP

Legislature
- 15th Legislative Assembly of Puerto Rico

Lower house
- 27th House of Representatives of Puerto Rico

Sessions
- 1st: January 14, 2005 – January 12, 2006
- 2nd: January 13, 2006 – January 11, 2007
- 3rd: January 12, 2007 – January 10, 2008
- 4th: January 11, 2008 – January 1, 2009

The 23rd Senate of Puerto Rico was the upper house of the 15th Legislative Assembly of Puerto Rico that met from January 2, 2005, to January 1, 2009. All members were elected in the General Elections of 2004. The Senate had a majority of members from the New Progressive Party (PNP).

The body is counterparted by the 27th House of Representatives of Puerto Rico in the lower house.

== Leadership ==
Position	Name	Party	District
President of the Senate	Kenneth McClintock	PNP	At-Large
President pro Tempore	Orlando Parga Figueroa	PNP	At-Large
Majority Leader	Margarita Nolasco	PNP	VI
Majority Whip	Carlos Pagán	PNP	IV
Minority Leader	José Luis Dalmau	PPD	VII
Minority Whip	Sila Mari González	PPD	At-Large

== Members ==
=== Membership ===
District	Name	Party
I – San Juan	Roberto Arango	PNP
I – San Juan	Carlos Díaz Sánchez	PNP
II – Bayamón	Migdalia Padilla Alvelo	PNP
II – Bayamón	Carmelo Ríos Santiago	PNP
III – Arecibo	José Emilio González Velázquez	PNP
III – Arecibo	Pedro Rossello	PNP
IV – Mayagüez-Aguadilla	Luis Daniel Muñiz Cortes	PNP
IV – Mayagüez-Aguadilla	Carlos Pagán	PNP
V – Ponce	Modesto Agosto Alicea	PPD
V – Ponce	Bruno Ramos	PPD
VI – Guayama	Margarita Nolasco	PNP
VI – Guayama	Cirilo Tirado Rivera	PPD
VII – Humacao	José Luis Dalmau	PPD
VII – Humacao	Sixto Hernández Serrano	PPD
VIII – Carolina	Héctor Martínez Maldonado	PNP
VIII – Carolina	Lornna Soto Villanueva	PNP
At-Large	Luz Arce Ferrer	PNP
At-Large	Eudaldo Báez Galib	PPD
At-Large	Norma Burgos	PNP
At-Large	Jorge De Castro Font	PNP
At-Large	Antonio Fas Alzamora	PPD
At-Large	José Garriga Picó	PNP
At-Large	Sila María González Calderón	PPD
At-Large	Juan Eugenio Hernández Mayoral	PPD
At-Large	Kenneth McClintock	PNP
At-Large	Orlando Parga Figueroa	PNP
At-Large	María de Lourdes Santiago	PIP

Party	At-large			District			Total seats
Party	Votes	%	Seats	Votes	%	Seats	Total seats
New Progressive Party	845,228	44.74	6	1,845,204	48.84	11	17
Popular Democratic Party	767,626	40.63	4	1,768,374	46.81	5	9
Puerto Rican Independence Party	178,541	9.45	1	160,632	4.25	0	1
Independent Movement of the Eastern Region				2,936	0.08	0	0
Other parties	297	0.02	0	826	0.02	0	0
Independents	97,673	5.17	0				0
Total	1,889,365	100.00	11	3,777,972	100.00	16	27
Valid votes	1,889,365	99.10					
Invalid votes	5,318	0.28					
Blank votes	11,927	0.63					
Total votes	1,906,610	100.00					
Registered voters/turnout	2,440,131	78.14					
Source: Puerto Rico Election Archive
