= 2020 Puerto Rico Senate election =

2020 Puerto Rico Senate elections
- November 3, 2020

All 27 seats in the Senate of Puerto Rico 14 seats needed for a majority
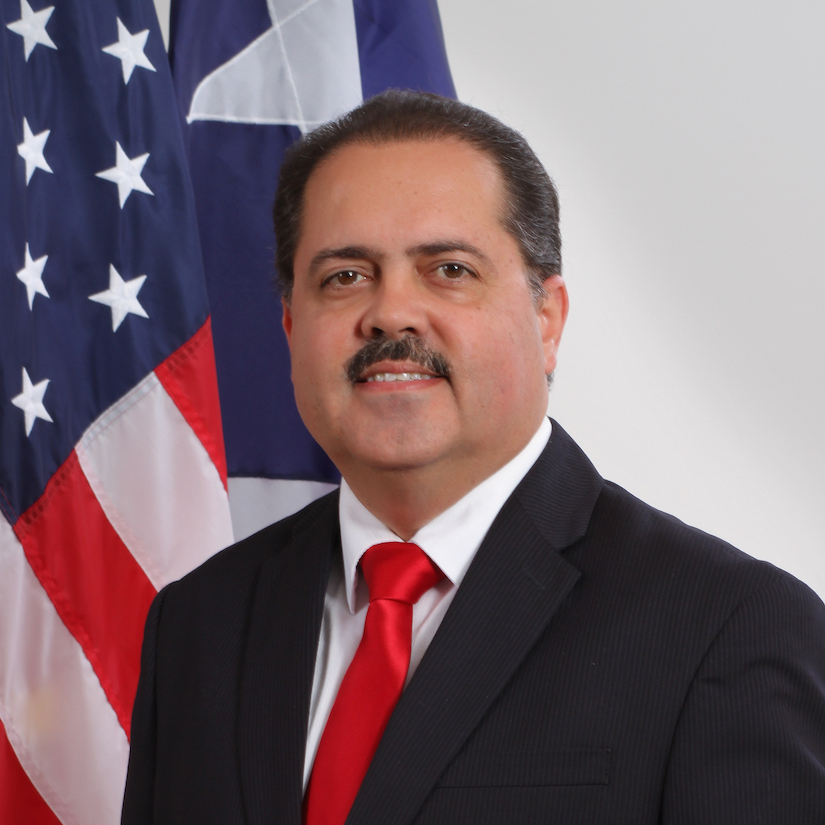

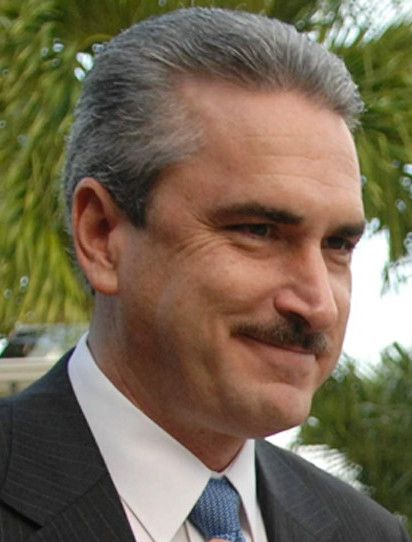

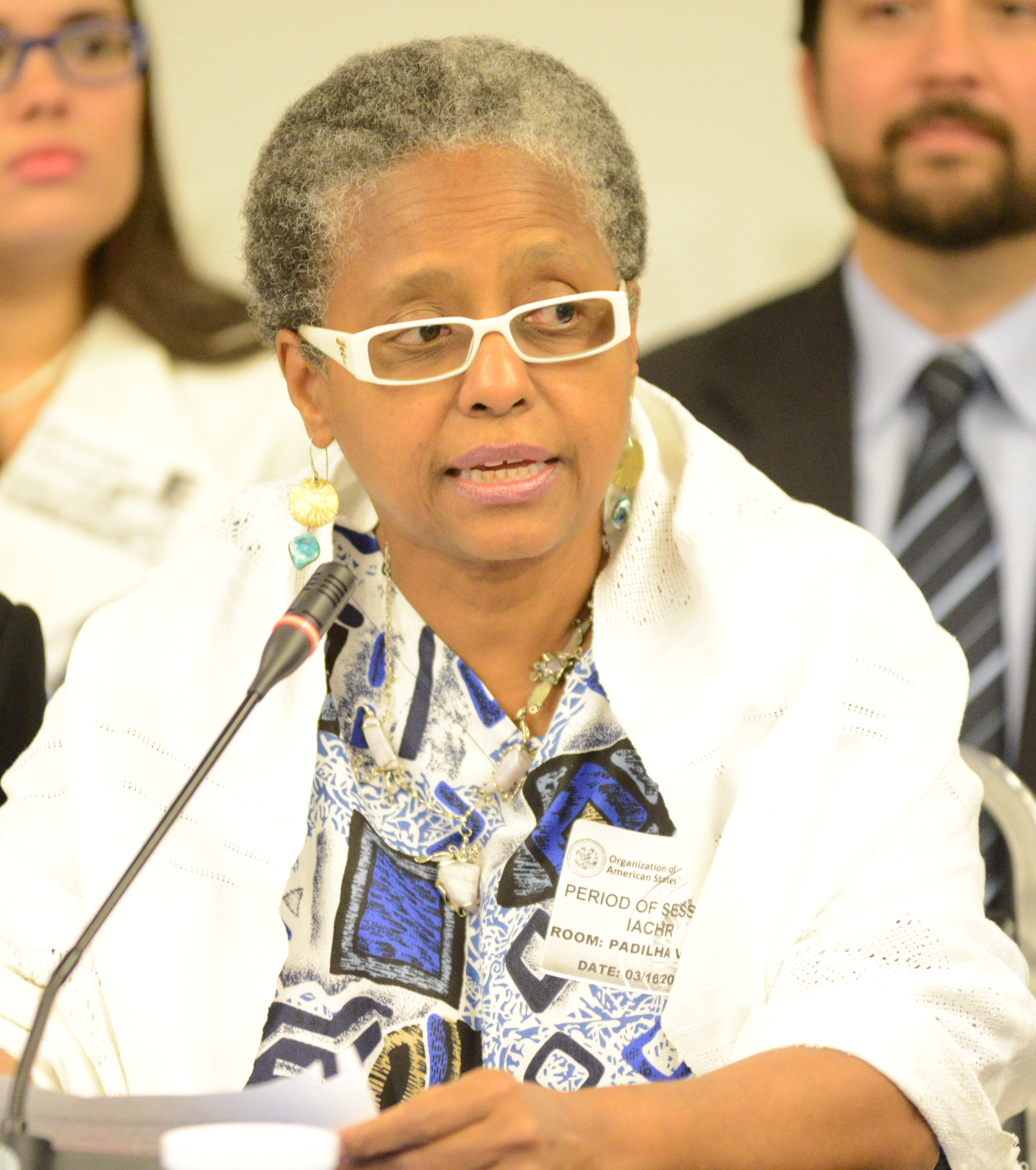

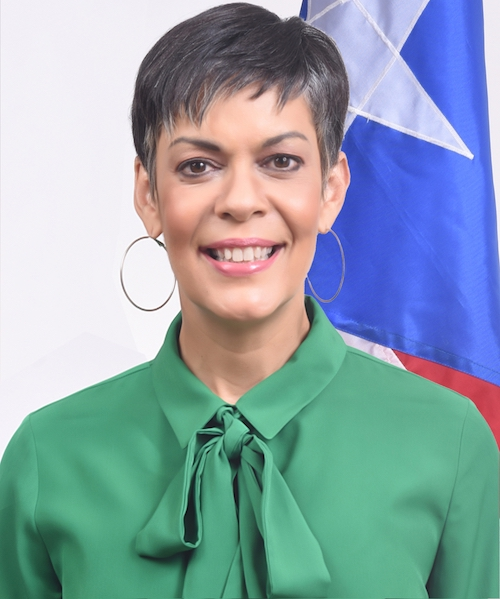

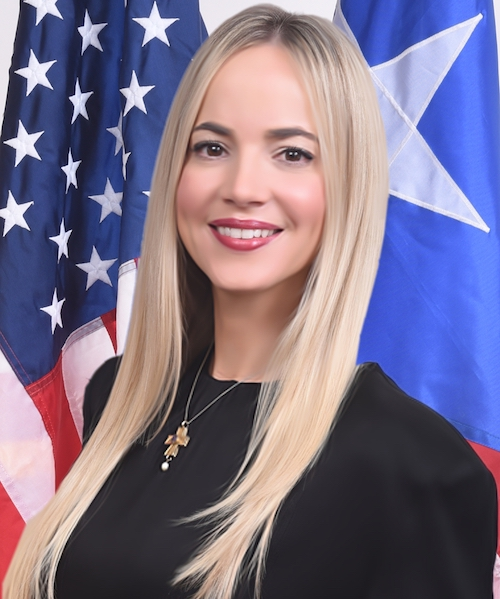

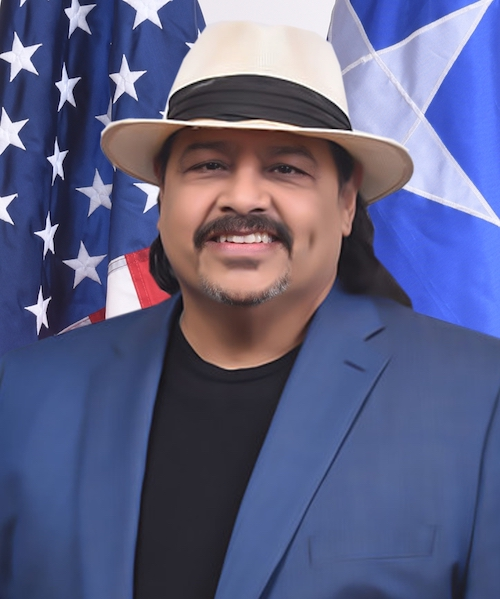
	Majority party	Minority party	Third party
Leader	José Luis Dalmau	Thomas Rivera Schatz	Ana Irma Rivera Lassén
Party	Popular Democratic	New Progressive	Citizens' Victory
Leader since	January 2, 2021	January 2, 2017	January 2, 2021
Seats before	7 (Note: The numbers of legislators in this senate increased from 27 to 30, because the New Progressive Party (PNP) won 21 of the 27 seats in contention, surpassing the two-thirds limit (18 seats). This automatically triggered Article Three of the Constitution of Puerto Rico which mandates that in such case new seats must be open for minority legislators. These new seats account for the number of seats the majority party surpassed (3 seats in this election).)	21	0
Seats after	12	10	2
Seat change	▲5	▼11	▲2
Popular vote	1,158,166	1,198,707	445,996
Percentage	34.63%	35.85%	13.34%
	Fourth party	Fifth party	Sixth party
Leader	María de Lourdes Santiago	Joanne Rodríguez Veve	Vargas Vidot
Party	Independence	Project Dignity	Independent
Leader since	January 2, 2021	January 2, 2021	January 2, 2017
Seats before	1	0	1
Seats after	1	1	1
Seat change	Steady	▲1	Steady
Popular vote	330,301	143,692	67,151
Percentage	9.88%	4.30%	2.01%
- Election results: PPD gain PPD hold PNP hold MVC gain PD gain PIP hold Independent hold
President of the Senate before election
Thomas Rivera Schatz
New Progressive
Elected President of the Senate
José Dalmau Santiago
Popular Democratic

The 2020 Puerto Rico Senate election was held on November 3, 2020, to elect the members of the 27th Senate of Puerto Rico, concurrently with the election of the Governor, the Resident Commissioner, the House of Representatives, and the mayors of the 78 municipalities. The winners will be elected to a four-year term from January 2, 2021, to January 2, 2025.

The New Progressive Party lost their two-thirds super-majority, but the Popular Democratic Party failed to win the 14 seats needed for a majority. The Puerto Rican Independence Party and Independent senator Vargas Vidot retained their seats, while the Citizen's Victory Movement and Project Dignity gained 2 and 1 seats respectively. José Luis Dalmau (PPD) was elected Senate President on January 2.

== Summary ==
There are 88 candidates running for senator:

- New Progressive Party (PNP) have 22 candidates, 15 of which are incumbent.
- Popular Democratic Party (PPD) have 22 candidates, 2 of which are incumbent.
- Puerto Rican Independence Party (PIP) have 19 candidates.
- Citizen's Victory Movement (MVC) have 19 candidates.
- Project Dignity (PD) have 5 candidates.
- 1 candidate is independent, 1 of which is incumbent.

== Senate Composition ==
=== 26th Senate of Puerto Rico (2017-2021) ===
PNP_{1}	PNP_{2}	PNP_{3}	PNP_{4}	PNP_{5}	PNP_{6}	PNP_{7}	PNP_{8}	PNP_{9}
PNP_{10}	PNP_{11}	PNP_{12}	PNP_{13}	PNP_{14}	PNP_{15}	PNP_{16}	PNP_{17}	PNP_{18}
PNP_{19}	PNP_{20}	PNP_{21}	PPD_{1}	PPD_{2}	PPD_{3}	PPD_{4}	PPD_{5}	PPD_{6}
PPD_{7}	PIP_{1}	IND_{1}						

=== 27th Senate of Puerto Rico (2021-2025) ===
PPD_{1}	PPD_{2}	PPD_{3}	PPD_{4}	PPD_{5}	PPD_{6}	PPD_{7}	PPD_{8}	PPD_{9}
PPD_{10}	PPD_{11}	PPD_{12}	PNP_{1}	PNP_{2}	PNP_{3}	PNP_{4}	PNP_{5}	PNP_{6}
PPD_{7}	PPD_{8}	PPD_{9}	PPD_{10}	MVC_{1}	MVC_{2}	PIP_{1}	PD_{1}	IND_{1}

== Results ==
=== Summary ===
Parties	District			At-large			Total seats	Composition	±%
Parties	Votes	%	Seats	Votes	%	Seats	Total seats	Composition	±%
Popular Democratic Party (PPD)	797,203	36.50%	10	377,195	31.21%	2	12	12 / 27	▲9
New Progressive Party (PNP)	814,941	37.32%	6	402,774	33.33%	4	10	10 / 27	▼12
Citizen's Victory Movement (MVC)	315,931	14.46%	0	133,069	11.01%	2	2	2 / 27	▲2
Puerto Rican Independence Party (PIP)	198,093	9.07%	0	136,679	11.32%	1	1	1 / 27	1
Project Dignity (PD)	57,465	2.63%	0	88,716	7.35%	1	1	1 / 27	▲1
Independents	0	0%	0	69,810	5.78%	1	1	1 / 27	1
Total	2,183,633	100.0	16	1,208,243	100.0	11	27		

=== Senator At-Large ===
2020 At-Large Senate Election
Party	Candidate	Votes	%	±%
Independence	María de Lourdes Santiago	136,679	11.29%	N/A
Project Dignity	Joanne Rodríguez Veve	88,716	7.33%	N/A
New Progressive	William Villafañe	81,863	6.76%	N/A
New Progressive	Thomas Rivera Schatz (incumbent)	80,139	6.62%	▼3.74
Popular Democratic	Juan Zaragoza Gómez	73,809	6.09%	N/A
Popular Democratic	José Dalmau Santiago (incumbent)	71,896	5.94%	N/A
Independent	José Vargas Vidot (incumbent)	69,810	5.76%	▼4.97
Citizens' Victory	Ana Irma Rivera Lassén	68,760	5.68%	N/A
Citizens' Victory	Rafael Bernabe Riefkohl	64,309	5.31%	N/A
New Progressive	Gregorio Matías (incumbent)	64,140	5.30%	N/A
New Progressive	Keren Riquelme	63,154	5.21%	N/A
Popular Democratic	Aníbal José Torres (incumbent)	61,202	5.05%	▼0.56
Popular Democratic	Brenda López de Arrarás	59,961	4.95%	N/A
New Progressive	Itzamar Peña Ramírez (incumbent)	57,220	4.72%	▼2.33
Popular Democratic	Ada Álvarez Conde	55,677	4.80%	N/A
New Progressive	Carlos Rodríguez Mateo (incumbent)	56,258	4.65%	N/A
Popular Democratic	Luis Vega Ramos	54,650	4.51%	N/A
Total votes		1,208,243	52.32%	▼0.13

Every party has a seat in the senate, making it the first time since 2004 that all parties are represented. María de Lourdes Santiago placed 1st for the second time (1st being 2012) and won a third non-consecutive term; Joanne Rodríguez Veve came in 2nd place, while Senate President Thomas Rivera Schatz came in 4th place, losing 3.74% of the vote relative to his last performance.

=== Senator by District ===
==== I San Juan ====
2020 Puerto Rico San Juan District Election
Party	Candidate	Votes	%	±%
New Progressive	Henry Neumann (incumbent)	52,492	19.81%	▼5.20
New Progressive	Nitza Morán	44,063	16.63%	N/A
Citizens' Victory	Rosa Seguí Cordero	35,739	13.49%	N/A
Popular Democratic	Jesús Manuel Laboy	34,639	13.07%	N/A
Popular Democratic	Claribel Martínez Marmolejos	33,651	12.57%	N/A
Citizens' Victory	Marilú Guzmán	31,651	11.94%	N/A
Independence	Adriana Guitiérrez Colón	18,091	6.83%	N/A
Independence	Andrés González Berdecia	15,037	5.67%	N/A
Turnout		265,025	53.28%	▼1.13

==== II Bayamón ====
2020 Bayamón District Election
Party	Candidate	Votes	%	±%
New Progressive	Carmelo Rios (incumbent)	52,108	20.69%	▼7.69
New Progressive	Migdalia Padilla Alvelo (incumbent)	50,009	19.86%	▼7.83
Popular Democratic	Magdiel Colon	32,978	13.10%	N/A
Popular Democratic	Carlos Roberto Hyland	32,239	12.80%	N/A
Citizens' Victory	Myrna Conty	26,712	10.61%	N/A
Citizens' Victory	Ruthie Arroyo	23,108	9.18%	N/A
Independence	Hugo Rodríguez Díaz	17,520	6.96%	N/A
Independence	Yelitza Lucena Quiles	17,136	6.81	N/A
Turnout		251,810	51.70%	▼2.75

==== III Arecibo ====
2020 Arecibo District Election
Party	Candidate	Votes	%	±%
Popular Democratic	Elizabeth Rosa Vélez	55,592	19.09%	▼1.21
Popular Democratic	Rubén Soto Rivera	55,051	18.91%	▼1.41
New Progressive	Ángel Martínez (incumbent)	54,824	18.83%	▼8.55
New Progressive	José Pérez Rosa (incumbent)	54,744	18.80%	▼8.58
Citizens' Victory	Yamira Colón Rosa	19,649	6.74%	N/A
Citizens' Victory	Annette Jiménez Collet	17,041	5.85%	N/A
Project Dignity	Arnaldo López Rosado	15,881	5.45%	N/A
Independence	Luis Romero Nieves	11,042	3.79%	N/A
Independence	Roberto Rivera Olivencia	7,357	2.53%	N/A
Turnout		291,181	52.72%	▼3.71

==== IV Mayagüez-Aguadilla ====
2020 Mayagüez-Aguadilla District Election
Party	Candidate	Votes	%	±%
Popular Democratic	Ada Garciá Montes	60,068	21.07%	N/A
Popular Democratic	Migdalia González	59,204	20.77%	N/A
New Progressive	Marcos Gonzalez	54,332	19.06%	N/A
New Progressive	Luis Daniel Muñiz (incumbent)	54,111	18.98	▼6.13
Citizens' Victory	Marisol Vega	17,743	6.22%	N/A
Citizens' Victory	Luis Ferren	16,664	5.50%	N/A
Independence	Luis Casiano Rodríguez	12,556	4.40%	N/A
Independence	Juan Mari Pesquera	11,375	3.99%	▲0.65
Turnout		285,053	53.32%	▼3.84

==== V Ponce ====
2020 Ponce District Election
Party	Candidate	Votes	%	±%
Popular Democratic	Marially González	56,846	20.07%	N/A
Popular Democratic	Ramón Ruiz	51,465	18.17%	▼4.43
New Progressive	Luis Berdiel (incumbent)	50,091	17.68%	▼7.68
New Progressive	Nelson Cruz (incumbent)	48,224	17.03%	▼7.66
Project Dignity	Elaine Arrufat Berastain	16,217	5.73%	N/A
Citizens' Victory	Daniel Ortíz Lugo	14,626	5.16%	N/A
Citizens' Victory	Maikel González	14,562	5.14%	N/A
Project Dignity	Luis Yordár Frau	11,976	4.23%	N/A
Independence	Ángel Comas Nazario	10,060	3.55%	N/A
Independence	José Ortiz Lugo	9,181	3.24%	N/A
Turnout		283,248	51.23%	▼2.98

==== VI Guayama ====
2020 Guayama District Election
Party	Candidate	Votes	%	±%
Popular Democratic	Gretchen Hau	69,386	23.63%	N/A
Popular Democratic	Albert Torres Berrios	67,419	22.96%	N/A
New Progressive	Alex Roque (incumbent)	57,943	19.73%	▼4.92
New Progressive	Wanda Cruz	57,300	19.51%	N/A
Citizens' Victory	Tomas Flores Torres	18,866	6.42%	N/A
Independence	Victor Alvarado Guzmán	13,240	4.51%	N/A
Independence	Justo Echevarriá Figueroa	9,485	3.23%	N/A
Turnout		293,639	54.62%	▼3.22

==== VII Humacao ====
2020 Humacao District Election
Party	Candidate	Votes	%	±%
Popular Democratic	Rosamar Trujillo Plumey	57,004	19.77%	N/A
New Progressive	Wanda Soto	54,822	19.01%	N/A
Popular Democratic	Hill Román Abreu	54,780	19.00%	N/A
New Progressive	Miguel Laureano (incumbent)	54,688	18.96	▼4.54
Citizens' Victory	Mayra Vicil Bernier	22,999	7.98%	N/A
Citizens' Victory	Xander Torres	17,509	6.07%	N/A
Independence	Edda López Serrano	15,154	5.25%	N/A
Independence	Juan Lebrón López	11,431	3.96%	N/A
Turnout		288,387	56.02%	▲0.81

==== VIII Carolina ====
2020 Carolina District Election
Party	Candidate	Votes	%	±%
Popular Democratic	Javier Aponte Dalmau	43,473	17.97%	N/A
New Progressive	Marissa Jiménez	42,740	17.66%	N/A
Popular Democratic	Christian Rodríguez	40,375	16.69%	N/A
New Progressive	Nayda Venegas Brown (incumbent)	40,344	16.67%	▼7.54
Citizens' Victory	Alice Pérez Fernandez	21,952	9.07%	N/A
Citizens' Victory	Reginald Smith Pizarro	19,374	8.01%	N/A
Project Dignity	Janise Santiago Ramos	13,391	5.53%	N/A
Independence	Marisol Quiñones Algarín	11,136	4.60%	▲1.48
Independence	Wanda Alemán Alemán	9,173	3.79%	N/A
Turnout		241,958	48.80%	▼3.09
