= Senator Pagán =

Senator Pagán may refer to:

- Bolívar Pagán (1897–1961), Senate of Puerto Rico
- Carlos Pagán (born 1954), Senate of Puerto Rico
