= Senator Ruiz =

Senator Ruiz may refer to:

- Israel Ruiz Jr. (born 1943), New York State Senate
- Ramón Ruiz (born 1965), Senate of Puerto Rico
- Teresa Ruiz (politician) (born 1974), New Jersey State Senate
