= Migdalia =

Migdalia is a female given name. Notable people with the name include:

- Migdalia Cruz (born 1958), American writer of plays, musical theatre, and opera
- Migdalia González (born 1973), Puerto Rican politician
- Migdalia Padilla, Puerto Rican politician
- Migdalia Pérez, Cuban baseball player
