= Juan Morales Rodríguez =

Juan Oscar Morales Rodríguez
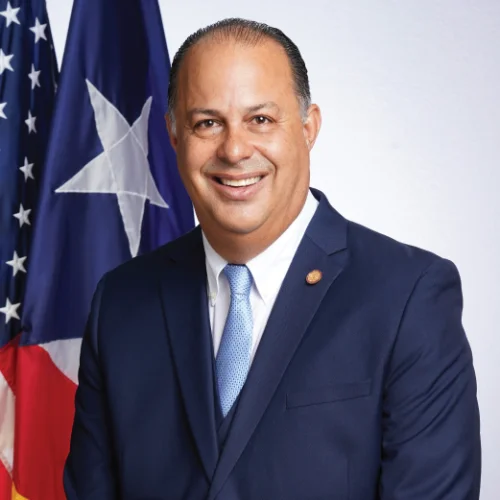

Member of the Puerto Rico Senate from the San Juan district
- Incumbent
- Assumed office September 21, 2022

Majority Whip of the Puerto Rico Senate
- Incumbent
- Assumed office January 2, 2025
- Preceded by: Migdalia González

Member of the Puerto Rico House of Representatives from the 3rd district
- In office January 2, 2017 – September 20, 2022
- Preceded by: Sonia Pacheco
- Succeeded by: José Hernández Concepción

Personal details
- Born: Juan Oscar Morales Rodríguez; January 6, 1972 (age 54) Jayuya, Puerto Rico
- Party: New Progressive
- Education: Pontifical Catholic University of Puerto Rico (BBA); University of Phoenix

Juan Oscar Morales Rodríguez (born January 6, 1972, in Jayuya) is a Puerto Rican politician. A member of the New Progressive Party, he currently serves as a senator for District I in the Senate of Puerto Rico, where he holds the position of Majority Whip.

== Personal life ==
Rodríguez was born on January 6, 1972, in Jayuya, Puerto Rico. He obtained his Bachelor's degree in Business Administration from the Pontifical Catholic University of Puerto Rico, and his Master's degree in Human Resources from the University of Phoenix.

From 1997 to 2009, he worked for the Puerto Rico Health Insurance Administration (Administración de Seguros de Salud de Puerto Rico).

== Political career ==
Rodríguez was first elected to the Puerto Rico House of Representatives in 2016, representing District 3. He was reelected in the 2020 Puerto Rico House of Representatives election, winning with 35.1% of the vote.

In September 2022, Rodríguez won a special election for District I of the Senate of Puerto Rico, filling the vacancy left by the resignation of Henry Neumann. He won reelection for his Senate seat in the 2024 Puerto Rico Senate election, alongside fellow District I senator Nitza Morán.

Senate of Puerto Rico
Preceded by Migdalia González	Majority Whip of the Puerto Rico Senate; 2023–Present	Incumbent
House of Representatives of Puerto Rico
Preceded by Sonia Pacheco	Member of the Puerto Rico House of Representatives from the 3rd District; 2017–2022	Succeeded by José Hernández Concepción
