= Rossana López León =

Puerto Rican politician

Rossana López

Member of the Puerto Rico Senate from the at-large district
- In office January 14, 2013 – January 2, 2021

Majority Whip Senate of Puerto Rico
- In office January 14, 2013 – January 2, 2016
- Preceded by: Lucy Arce
- Succeeded by: Ángel Chayanne Martínez

Personal details
- Born: March 6, 1969 (age 57) San Juan, Puerto Rico
- Party: Popular Democratic Party (PPD)
- Education: University of Puerto Rico at Cayey (BA)
- Profession: Politician

Rossana López León (born March 6, 1969) is a Puerto Rican politician and public servant from the Popular Democratic Party (PPD). López was elected to the Senate of Puerto Rico in 2012. Before that, she served as Director of the Office of Affairs of the Elderly.

== Early years and studies ==
Rossana López León was born in San Juan on March 6, 1969, to Norberto López and Carmen León. She is the fourth of five children. López grew up in Cayey. She served as class president during her junior high and high school years. She was also part of the honor roll during high school. Before entering college, López did missionary work in the Dominican Republic.

López received her bachelor's degree in Psychology from the University of Puerto Rico at Cayey. During her time in college, she founded the Volunteer Corps of the Mennonite Hospital of Cayey, where they developed an educational video about the elderly population in Puerto Rico. She was also part of an exchange student in the United States. Because of her work, she earned the Governor's Medal offered by the Office for Youth Affairs.

After that, López completed her master's degree in Gerontology at Virginia Commonwealth University.

== Professional career and public service ==
After graduating, López became part of the faculty of the University of Puerto Rico, Medical Sciences Campus. She then became the executive director of the Governor's Office for the Elderly Affairs, the first Elderly People's Solicitor, and the first representative from that field in the United Nations.

== Political career ==
López ran for a seat in the Senate of Puerto Rico under the Popular Democratic Party (PPD). After winning a spot on the 2012 primaries, López was elected on the general elections.

During her campaign in the 2020 San Juan, Puerto Rico mayoral election, which she lost, her campaign platform included support for LGBT communities of Puerto Rico. She also pledged to form commissions to support the community from Dominican Republic who have made Puerto Rico their home.

== See also ==
- 25th Senate of Puerto Rico

Senate of Puerto Rico
Preceded by Lucy Arce	Majority Whip of the Puerto Rico Senate; 2013-2016	Succeeded by Angel Martínez Santiago
