= Rosamar Trujillo Plumey =

Puerto Rican politician (born 1968)

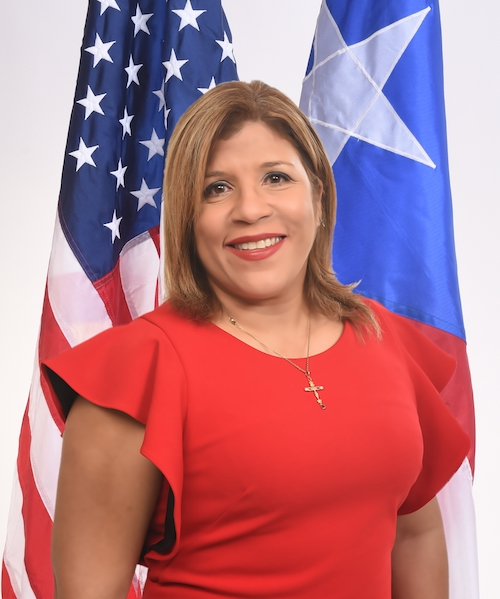
- Trujillo in 2021

Mayor of Humacao, Puerto Rico
- Incumbent
- Assumed office January 17, 2025
- Preceded by: Julio L. Geigel Pérez

Member of the Puerto Rico Senate from the Humacao district
- In office January 2, 2021 – December 31, 2024 Serving with Wanda Soto Tolentino

Personal details
- Born: November 21, 1968 (age 57) Arecibo, Puerto Rico
- Party: Popular Democratic Party
- Children: 1
- Parent: Marcelo Trujillo (father)
- Education: University of Puerto Rico at Humacao (BA); Interamerican University of Puerto Rico (MSW)

Rosamar Trujillo Plumey (born November 21, 1968) is a Puerto Rican politician and social worker serving as the mayor-elect of Humacao, Puerto Rico. She was as a member of the Senate of Puerto Rico for district VII from 2021 to 2023.

== Early life and education ==
Rosamar Trujillo Plumey was born on November 21, 1968, in Arecibo, Puerto Rico. She is the daughter of former mayor of Humacao Marcelo Trujillo Panisse and Rosa Elena Plumey. Her family moved to Humacao, Puerto Rico in 1978. Her father later served as mayor and her mother was an elementary school teacher. Trujillo Plumey has three older brothers.

Trujillo Plumey earned a B.A. in social work from the University of Puerto Rico at Humacao. She completed a M.S.W. in program supervision and administration at the Interamerican University of Puerto Rico.

== Career ==
Trujillo Plumey worked as a social worker in the hospice section at the Ryder Memorial Hospital in Humacao. In 1994, she joined the Humacao administration of juvenile institutions and detention center. In 2001, she joined the Puerto Rico Department of Family Affairs where she worked as a supervisory social worker, special advisor to the secretary, and director of federal Title IV-E funds. Trujillo Plumey participated in her father's mayoral campaigns from the time she was in high school until his last campaign in 2016. She supported at-risk youth through initiatives such as the "Proyecto Cumbres" mentorship program.

A member of the Popular Democratic Party (PPD), Trujillo Plumey started her senatorial campaign for district VII in 2020 and was sworn on January 3, 2021. She chaired three committees: the Commission on Social Welfare and Elder Affairs, the Commission on Eastern Development, and the Commission on Cooperativism. Her legislative work emphasized the decentralization of services, transparency in fund management, and support for older adults, youth, and economic development initiatives. She resigned in December 2023.

In June 2023, Trujillo Plumey hinted at a possible Humacao mayoral campaign during the 2024 Puerto Rican municipal elections. In December 2023, she officially announced her candidacy for mayor of Humacao under the Popular Democratic Party (PPD). To demonstrate her commitment to transparency and community service, she adopted the slogan "la humildad paga" (humility pays), echoing a lesson from her father's public service. Her campaign called for restoring trust in the municipal government and fostering teamwork to achieve progress for Humacao. Trujillo Plumey inaugurated her mayoral campaign headquarters on September 1, 2024 in Humacao. The event began with the "Pa’l Pueblo" walk, a tradition established by her father, Trujillo Panisse, a former mayor of Humacao. Trujillo Plumey defeated incumbent mayor Julio L. Geigel Pérez, who had assumed office after a special election in 2022. She secured 8,156 votes (45.84%) compared to Geigel Pérez's 7,421 votes (41.71%), with over 96% of polling stations reporting. Her victory marked a return to her family’s leadership in Humacao and ended the New Progressive Party’s tenure in the mayoralty.

== Personal life ==
Trujillo has one son.
