= Marcelo Trujillo =

Puerto Rican politician (1935–2019)

Mayor of Humacao
- In office January 14, 2001 – September 15, 2019 (died in office)
- Preceded by: Julio César López Gerena
- Succeeded by: Luis Raúl Sánchez

Member of the Municipal Assembly of Humacao, Puerto Rico
- In office 1996–2000

Personal details
- Born: April 30, 1935 Guayanilla, Puerto Rico
- Died: September 15, 2019 (aged 84) Caguas, Puerto Rico
- Party: Popular Democratic Party (PPD)
- Spouse: Rosa Elena Plumey
- Children: Marcelo, Javier and Rosamar Trujillo Plumey
- Education: Pontifical Catholic University of Puerto Rico (BSS)

Military service
- Allegiance: United States of America
- Branch/service: United States Army

Marcelo Trujillo Panisse (April 30, 1935 – September 15, 2019) was a Puerto Rican athlete and politician, who was elected to four terms as mayor of Humacao, Puerto Rico. Trujillo was affiliated with the Popular Democratic Party (PPD) and served as mayor from 2001 to 2019. He earned a bachelor's degree in political and social sciences from the Pontifical Catholic University of Puerto Rico. He served in the United States Army during the Korean War era.

== Basketball ==
Trujillo had a career in basketball when he played for the Leones de Ponce of Baloncesto Superior Nacional. Later, Trujillo Panisse retired as a player, but continued at the BSN as a coach. In that capacity, he led the Piratas de Quebradillas and the Capitanes de Arecibo.

== Mayor ==
After serving as a Member of the Municipal Assembly of Humacao from 1996 to 2000, Trujillo ran for mayor of Humacao, Puerto Rico at the 2000 elections. Served for nineteen years; from 2000 until his death in 2019.

== Death ==
He died on September 15, 2019, at the age of 84 due to cardiac arrest. He was buried at the Pax Christi Cemetery in Humacao, Puerto Rico.

== Legacy ==
In 2019, The 8,000 seats Humacao Arena was named after former mayor Marcelo Trujillo.
