= Ángel Chayanne Martínez =

Puerto Rican politician (born 1964)

Angel Martínez Santiago

Member of the Puerto Rico Senate from the Arecibo district
- In office 2009–2020

Majority Whip of the Senate of Puerto Rico
- In office 2017–2020
- Preceded by: Rossana López León
- Succeeded by: Gretchen Hau

Personal details
- Born: February 17, 1964 (age 62) Ciales, Puerto Rico
- Party: New Progressive Party
- Education: Puerto Rico Junior College; American University of Puerto Rico (BBA); Caribbean University (MS)
- Profession: Politician, Radiologic technologist

Angel "Chayanne" Martínez Santiago (born February 17, 1964) is a Puerto Rican politician and senator. He has been a member of the Senate of Puerto Rico since 2008.

== Early years and studies ==
Angel Martínez Santiago was born on February 17, 1964, in Ciales, Puerto Rico. His parents are María Santiago and Miguel Angel Martínez.

Martínez approved 60 credits en route to a pre-medical degree in 1982. He graduated from Puerto Rico Junior College in 1986, certified as a radiologic technologist. In 2002, he obtained a bachelor's degree in business administration from the American University of Puerto Rico, graduating magna cum laude. In 2005, he finished his master's degree in human resources from Caribbean University, graduating summa cum laude.

== Professional career ==
Martínez worked as a radiologic technologist full-time in Doctor's Center from 1990 to 1996, and part-time in Manatí Medical Center from 1987 to 2001. In 1997 he started working for the State Insurance Fund Corporation where he supervised the Department of Radiology. He worked there until December 2008, after being elected as senator.

== Political career ==
Martínez began his political career in his teens, becoming president of the PNP Youth in Ciales by 1986. In 2007, he presented his candidacy to the Senate of Puerto Rico for the District of Arecibo winning the 2008 PNP primary. In the 2008 general elections, he won receiving the most votes in the District.

After being sworn in on January 2, 2009, he was named president of the Commission of Health, and vice-president of the Commissions of Economic Development and Planning, Sports and Recreation, and Natural Resources. He is also member of the Commissions of Treasury and Cooperativism.

In June 2009, outgoing Secretary of Health Jaime Rivera Dueño, claimed that Senator Martínez pressured him into naming people close to him to positions in the Department of Health in exchange for his confirmation. According to Rivera Dueño, Martínez' sister was among the ones the Senator asked him to hire.

Martínez ran again for senator in the 2012 general elections. He was one of the few senators from the New Progressive Party (PNP) to retain his seat, defeating the candidates of the other parties by a small margin. Martínez ran again for senator in 2020 but was not reelected and left office on January 2, 2021.

Senate of Puerto Rico
Preceded by Rossana López León	Majority Whip of the Puerto Rico Senate; 2017–2021	Succeeded by Gretchen Hau
