= Luis Daniel Muñiz =

Member of the Senate of Puerto Rico

Luis Daniel Muñiz Cortés

Member of the Puerto Rico Senate from the Mayagüez-Aguadilla district
- In office January 2, 2004 – January 1, 2013
- In office January 2, 2017 – January 2, 2021

Personal details
- Born: July 1, 1974 (age 52) Moca, Puerto Rico
- Party: New Progressive Party
- Education: Interamerican University of Puerto Rico at Aguadilla (B.Ed); Holyoke Community College; Phoenix University (MBA)
- Profession: Politician

Luis Daniel Muñiz Cortés (born July 7, 1974) is a Puerto Rican politician and senator. He has been a member of the Senate of Puerto Rico since 2004.

== Early years and studies ==
Luis Daniel Muñiz was born July 7, 1974, on Moca, Puerto Rico. He studied elementary and high school in the city of Moca. In 1999, he started studying at the Interamerican University of Puerto Rico Aguadilla Campus, where he received his bachelor's degree in secondary education with a major in history and social studies. Muñiz then went on to study at Holyoke Community College in Holyoke, Massachusetts. He then finished his master's degree in administration and supervision from Phoenix University.

== Professional career ==
Muñiz has worked for the Department of Family of the Government of Puerto Rico. He also worked as a history teacher for the Puerto Rico Department of Education and as service coordinator for the Puerto Rico House of Representatives on his district.

== Political career ==
In 1994, Muñiz was president of the PNP Youth in Moca. Two years later, he served as regional director of the youth of his party in the West. In 1998, he was appointed as regional director of public services.

In 2004, Muñiz was elected to the Senate of Puerto Rico for the District of Mayagüez at the 2004 general elections. He was the candidate with most votes for the position in that district. During that first term, he presided the Ethics Commission of the Senate, as well as the Jury Commission.

After winning the 2008 PNP primary, Muñiz was reelected at the 2008 general elections. He currently presides over the West Region Commission and the Joint Commission on Internships. He is also Vice-president of the Commissions of Education, Consumer Affairs, and Human Resources, among others.

In August 2011, Muñiz expressed interest in the position of Alternate Speaker. Senator Larry Seilhamer, the Alternate Speaker, had resigned to fill in Roberto Arango's position of Majority Speaker, leaving a vacant open.

Muñiz ran again for Senator in the 2012 general elections, but lost to the candidates of the Popular Democratic Party (PPD).
