= Gretchen Hau =

Puerto Rican lawyer and senator

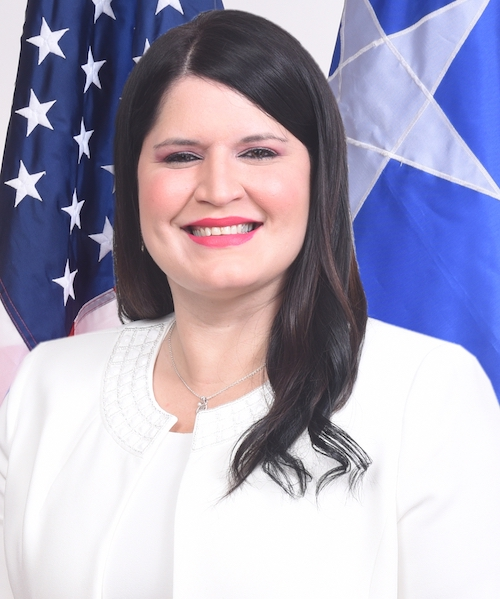
- Hau in 2021

Member of the Puerto Rico Senate from the Guayama district
- In office 2021–2023

Majority Whip of the Senate of Puerto Rico
- In office 2021–2023
- Preceded by: Ángel Chayanne Martínez
- Succeeded by: Migdalia González

Member of the Puerto Rico House of Representatives from the 29th district
- Incumbent
- Assumed office May 16, 2023
- Preceded by: José Aníbal Díaz

Personal details
- Born: Cayey, Puerto Rico
- Party: Popular Democratic Party
- Other political affiliations: Democratic
- Education: University of Puerto Rico at Cayey (BBA, MBA); Interamerican University of Puerto Rico School of Law (JD)
- Profession: Politician, Lawyer

Gretchen Marie Hau is a Puerto Rican politician and lawyer. She is a representative for the district of Cidra-Cayey, affiliated to the Popular Democratic Party of Puerto Rico. She was a "majority whip" in the Puerto Rican senate.

== Education ==
Hau studied at Colegio Radians in Cayey, Graduated from the University of Puerto Rico at Cayey with a bachelor's degree in Business Administration and a master's degree in Business Administration with concentration in Human Resources and Personnel Administration from the Interamerican University of Puerto Rico. She obtained Juris Doctor with honors in Law during 2010 from the Interamerican University of Puerto Rico School of Law. She is a licensed lawyer from 2011.

== Politics ==
She worked for 20 years alongside the mayor of Cayey, Hon. Rolando Ortiz Velázquez as executive assistant. She is the first woman to hold the position of executive director of the Puerto Rico Mayors Association for four years from 2015 to 2019. Ran successfully for the Puerto Rico Senate of the Guayama district winning in the 2020 elections being the first woman under the Popular Democratic Party to accomplish this win. In 2023 she resigned in the Puerto Rico Senate and went to the Puerto Rico House of Representatives for the 29th district after the death of Representative José Aníbal Díaz. She is the first woman Representative of District 29.

== See also ==
- List of Puerto Ricans

Senate of Puerto Rico
Preceded by Ángel Chayanne Martínez	Majority Whip of the Puerto Rico Senate; 2021–2023	Succeeded by Migdalia González
House of Representatives of Puerto Rico
Preceded by José Aníbal Díaz	Member of the Puerto Rico House of Representatives from the 29th District; 2023–Present	Incumbent
