= Ada García Montes =

Puerto Rican politician (born 1979)

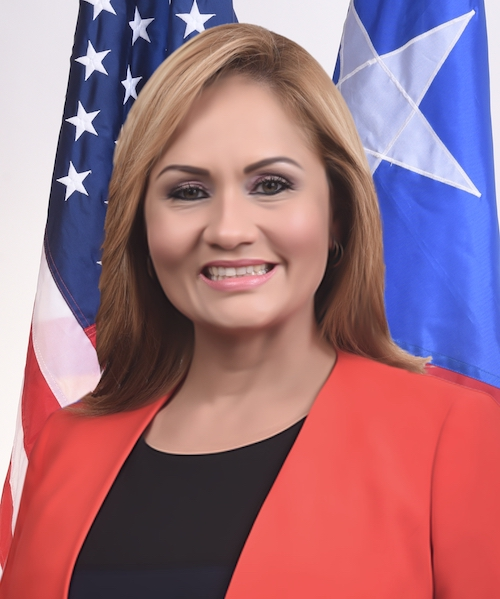
- Official portrait, 2021

Member of the Puerto Rico Senate from the Mayagüez district
- In office January 2, 2021 – December 31, 2024 Serving with Migdalia González

Personal details
- Born: January 21, 1979 (age 47) Mayagüez, Puerto Rico
- Party: Popular Democratic Party
- Education: University of Puerto Rico, Río Piedras Campus (BA); Pontifical Catholic University of Puerto Rico School of Law (JD)

Ada I. García Montes (born January 21, 1979) is a Puerto Rican lawyer and politician serving as a member of the Senate of Puerto Rico for district IV.

== Life ==
García was born January 21, 1979, in Mayagüez, Puerto Rico. She was raised in Rincón, Puerto Rico. She has a younger sister. García attended public school and completed a bachelor's degree in secondary education, dance, and theatre with a concentration in special education at the University of Puerto Rico, Río Piedras Campus. She earned a J.D. at the Pontifical Catholic University of Puerto Rico School of Law.

Before practicing as a lawyer, García worked for twelve years as a teacher in the Puerto Rico Department of Education. She was a professor at the Center for Training and Fine Arts (C.A.B.A.) at the Ramey Air Force Base. García is currently a notary lawyer admitted by the Supreme Court of Puerto Rico in 2018.

A member of the Popular Democratic Party, García began her senatorial campaign in November 2019. On January 2, 2021, she was sworn to the Senate of Puerto Rico for district IV. She chairs the Tourism and Culture commissions and the Education Commission. She is also the vice chair of the Agriculture Commission and the Western Development Commission.
