= Assistant party leaders of the Senate of Puerto Rico =

Majority Whip of the Senate of Puerto Rico PPD Leader
- Incumbent; Gretchen Marie Hau Irizarry since January 3, 2021
- Style: Senator

Minority Whip of the Senate of Puerto Rico PNP Leader
- Incumbent; Carmelo Ríos Santiago since January 3, 2021
- Style: Senator

Minority Whip of the Senate of Puerto Rico MVC Leader
- Incumbent; Rafael Bernabe Riefkohl since January 3, 2021
- Style: Senator

The Assistant Majority and Minority Leaders of the Senate of Puerto Rico (commonly called Majority Whip and Minority Whip) are two Puerto Rican Senators who are elected by the party conferences that hold the majority and the minority respectively. These leaders substitute the Majority and Minority leaders in their absence.

== Current assistant leaders ==
The Senate is currently composed of 12 senators from the Popular Democratic Party (PPD), 10 senators from the New Progressive Party (PNP), 2 senators from the Movimiento Victoria Ciudadana (MVC), and one senator each from the Puerto Rican Independence Party (PIP) and Proyecto Dignidad (PD) as well as one independent senator.

The incumbent whips are senators at-large Gretchen Marie Hau Irizarry (from the PPD), Carmelo Ríos Santiago (from the PNP), and Rafael Bernabe Riefkohl (from the MVC).

== List of party whips ==
The "Majority" column indicates which party was the majority in the Senate, while the opposing column indicates the minority. The PIP is usually a minority with just one senator, which also precludes it from having an assistant leader.

Senate	Dates	PNP Whip	Majority	PPD Whip	PIP Whip	MVC Whip
1st	1949–1953		PPD Maj →		N/A	
2nd	1953–1957		PPD Maj →			
3rd	1957–1961		PPD Maj →		N/A	
4th	1961–1965		PPD Maj →		N/A	
5th	1965–1969		PPD Maj →		N/A	
6th	1969–1973		PPD Maj →		N/A	
7th	1973–1977	Sila Nazario de Ferrer	PPD Maj →			
8th	1977–1981		← PNP Maj		N/A	
9th	1981–1985		PPD Maj →		N/A	
10th	1985–1989		PPD Maj →			
11th	1989–1993		PPD Maj →		N/A	
12th	1993–1997		← PNP Maj			
13th	1997–2001		← PNP Maj			
14th	2001–2005	Orlando Parga	PPD Maj →			
15th	2005	Margarita Nolasco (Guayama)	← PNP Maj	Sila Mari González		
15th	2005–2009	Carlos Pagán (Mayagüez)	← PNP Maj	Sila Mari González		
16th	2009–2013	Lucy Arce (At-large)	← PNP Maj	Eduardo Bhatia (At-large)	N/A	
17th	2013–2017	Carmelo Ríos (Bayamón)	PPD Maj →	Rossana López León (At-large)	N/A	
18th	2017–2021	Angel Martínez Santiago (Arecibo)	PNP Maj ←	José Luis Dalmau (Humacao)	N/A	
19th	2017–2021	Carmelo Ríos Santiago (Bayamón)	PPD Minority control →	Gretchen Marie Hau Irizarry (Guayama)	N/A	Rafael Bernabe Riefkohl
Senate	Dates	PNP Whip	Majority	PPD Whip	PIP Whip	MVC Whip

== See also ==
- Party leaders of the Senate of Puerto Rico
