= Javier Aponte Dalmau =

Puerto Rican politician

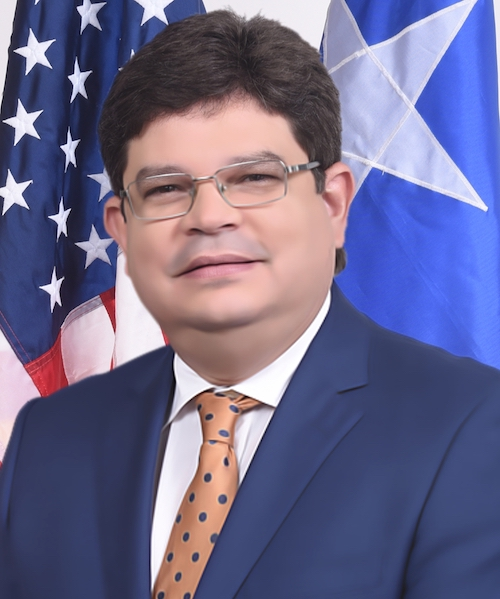

Majority Leader of the Puerto Rico Senate
- In office January 2, 2021 – January 2, 2025
- Preceded by: Carmelo Ríos Santiago
- Succeeded by: Gregorio Matías Rosario

Member of the Puerto Rico Senate from the Carolina district
- In office January 2, 2021 – January 2, 2025 Serving with Marissa Jiménez

Member of the Puerto Rico House of Representatives from the 38th district
- In office January 2, 2013 – January 2, 2021
- Preceded by: Eric Correa Rivera
- Succeeded by: Wanda del Valle Correa

Personal details
- Born: May 18, 1971 (age 55) San Juan, Puerto Rico
- Party: Popular Democratic
- Other party: Democratic
- Education: University of Puerto Rico (BBA); Interamerican University, San Germán (MBA); Pontifical Catholic University of Puerto Rico School of Law (JD)

Javier Aponte Dalmau is a Puerto Rican politician affiliated with the Popular Democratic Party (PPD). He was elected to the Puerto Rico House of Representatives in 2012 to represent District 38.

== Education ==
He has a Bachelor's degree in Business Administration with a concentration in finance from the University of Puerto Rico. He earned a Master of Business Administration with a concentration in finance from the Interamerican University of Puerto Rico. He earned a Juris Doctor from the Pontifical Catholic University of Puerto Rico School of Law.

House of Representatives of Puerto Rico
Preceded by Eric Correa Rivera	Member of the Puerto Rico House of Representatives from the 38th district 2013–2021	Succeeded by Wanda del Valle Correa
Senate of Puerto Rico
Preceded by Carmelo Ríos Santiago	Majority Leader of the Puerto Rico Senate; 2021–2025	Succeeded by Gregorio Matías Rosario
