= Carlos Pagán =

Senator of Puerto Rico

Member of the Puerto Rico Senate from the Mayagüez-Aguadilla district
- In office 2005–2009
- In office 1997-2001

Majority Whip of the Senate of Puerto Rico
- In office 2005–2009
- Preceded by: Bruno Ramos
- Succeeded by: Margarita Nolasco

Personal details
- Born: Carlos A. Pagán González; August 27, 1954 Mayagüez, Puerto Rico
- Died: September 23, 2025 (aged 71)
- Party: New Progressive Party
- Spouse: Ramonita Pabón
- Education: Interamerican University of Puerto Rico at San Germán (BA, MCJ, MPA)
- Profession: Politician

Carlos A. Pagán González (August 27, 1954 – September 23, 2025) was a Puerto Rican politician and former senator. He served as a member of the Senate of Puerto Rico from 1997 to 2009, representing the New Progressive Party (PNP).

== Early years and studies ==
Carlos A. Pagán González was born on August 27, 1954, in Mayagüez, Puerto Rico, to Hilda González and Manuel Pagán Ramírez. He has a sister, called Carmen. Pagán finished his elementary and high school in Lajas. Then, he received a Bachelor's degree in Political Science, and a Master's degree in the Criminal Justice and Public Administration. He achieved both degrees with magna cum laude honors from the Interamerican University of Puerto Rico at San Germán.

== Professional career ==
Pagán had worked as Director of the Employment Rights Office in Lajas, as well as Regional Coordinator of Social Services of Mayagüez, and Regional Director of the Department of Natural and Environmental Resources. He also had worked as a History professor at the Interamerican University of Puerto Rico at San Germán.

== Political career ==
Pagán showed interest in politics since being a teenager. When he was 14 years old, he was the President of the PNP Youth, and then he became one of the youngest members of the Municipal Assembly.

In 1996, he was elected to the Senate of Puerto Rico for the first time, representing the District of Mayagüez. During that term, he presided the Commission of Natural Resources and Environmental Affairs, and was Vicepresident of the Commission of Employment and Veteran Affairs, among others.

Pagán lost the 2000 general elections, but was reelected again in 2004. He served as the Majority Whip of his party during this term.

Pagán presented his candidacy for the 2008 elections, but in the primaries of the party, Evelyn Vázquez narrowly defeated him, leaving Pagán out of the race. After that, Pagán has worked as a special aide to senator Norma Burgos.

== Personal life ==
Pagán was married to Ramonita "Cuca" Pabón, who has a master's degree in Counseling and Rehabilitation.

== Death ==
Carlos Pagán died on September 23, 2025 at the age of 71 after suffering from health issues. He was buried at the Lajas Municipal Cemetery in Lajas, Puerto Rico.

== See also ==
- Senate of Puerto Rico

Senate of Puerto Rico
Preceded by Margarita Nolasco	Majority Whip of the Puerto Rico Senate; 2005–2009	Succeeded by Lucy Arce
