= Luz Arce Ferrer =

Puerto Rican politician

Luz Z. Arce Ferrer
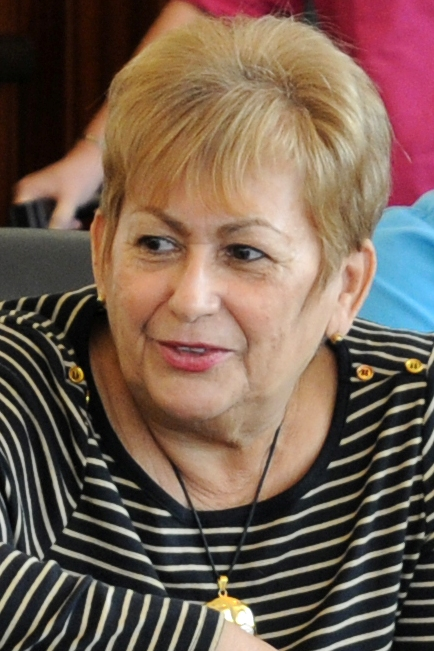
- Luz Arce Ferrer in 2013

Member of the Puerto Rico Senate from the at-large district
- In office 1996 – January 1, 2013

Majority Whip of the Senate of Puerto Rico
- In office 2011–2012
- Preceded by: Larry Seilhamer
- Succeeded by: Rossana López León

President pro tempore of the Senate of Puerto Rico
- In office 2000
- Preceded by: Aníbal Marrero Pérez
- Succeeded by: Velda González

Personal details
- Born: March 6, 1950 (age 76) Aguadilla, Puerto Rico
- Party: New Progressive Party
- Children: Nayda
- Education: University of Puerto Rico at Mayagüez (BA); Temple University
- Profession: Politician

Luz Zenaida "Lucy" Arce Ferrer (born March 6, 1950), is a Puerto Rican politician. She served as a member of the Senate of Puerto Rico from 1996 till 2013.

== Early years and studies ==
Lucy Arce was born in Aguadilla, Puerto Rico. She completed a Bachelor of Arts with a concentration in English from the University of Puerto Rico at Mayagüez. Then, she earns her certification in Public Housing Administration from Temple University.

== Professional career ==
Arce has worked as a teacher with the Head Start Program, and as an Ombudsman for the Aguadilla region. She also worked as Regional Director of the Public Housing Administration in Aguadilla, and then as Regional Manager of the Association of Commonwealth Employees (AEELA) in Arecibo.

In 1993, Arce was appointed as Auxiliar Administrator of the Retirement System Administration for the Government Employees of Puerto Rico. She also served as Commissioner of the Women Affairs Commission.

She has been a member of the League of United Latin American Citizens (LULAC) for more than 30 years. She actively participates in other grassroots organizations in Puerto Rico and the United States.

== Political career ==
Arce began her political career with the pro-statehood youth in Aguadilla. She presided the Women Organization of the New Progressive Party for eleven years, and also served as vice-president of the party.

In 1996, Arce was elected as Senator At-large. She was the third candidate with most votes, and the second within her party. She was reelected in 2000 and 2004. Arce won a slot in the PNP ballot at the PNP primaries and in 2008, she was elected for her fourth consecutive term, being the fourth candidate with most votes, and the third within her party.

During her time in the Senate of Puerto Rico, she has served as vice-president of the Senate, Alternate Majority Speaker, President of the Women Legislative Assembly, and President of Commissions of Work, Veteran Affairs, and Human Resources.

== Personal life ==
Lucy Arce has a daughter called Nayda, and five grandchildren.

== See also ==
- Senate of Puerto Rico

Senate of Puerto Rico
Preceded by Aníbal Marrero Pérez	President pro tempore of the Senate of Puerto Rico; 2000-2001	Succeeded by Velda González
