= Ramón Ruiz =

Puerto Rican politician (born 1965)

Ramón Ruiz Nieves

Member of the Puerto Rico Senate from the Ponce District
- In office January 2, 2020 – December 31, 2024

Member of the Puerto Rico Senate from the Ponce District
- In office January 2, 2013 – January 2, 2017

Member of the Puerto Rico House of Representatives from the 22nd District
- In office January 2, 2001 – January 2, 2005
- Preceded by: Waldemar Quiles
- Succeeded by: Javier Rivera Aquino

Personal details
- Born: January 18, 1965 (age 61) Arecibo, Puerto Rico
- Party: Popular Democratic Party (PPD)
- Profession: Politician, chemist

Ramón Ruiz Nieves is a Puerto Rican politician from the Popular Democratic Party (PPD). Ruiz was elected to the Senate of Puerto Rico in 2012. Ruiz was elected once again in the 2020 election as District Senator.

Ruiz was born in Arecibo. He has a Master's degree in administration and labor law. Ruiz has also worked as a chemist. He is currently married, has three children, and lives in Lares.

Ruiz ran for a seat in the Senate of Puerto Rico under the Popular Democratic Party (PPD). After winning a spot in the 2012 primaries, he was elected in the general elections to represent the District of Ponce. Ruiz won the primary in 2020 for District Senator and obtained victory in the general elections in November 2020 under the Popular Democratic Party. Once again, being the Senator representing the District of Ponce.

== See also ==
- 25th Senate of Puerto Rico
