= Migdalia González =

Puerto Rican politician

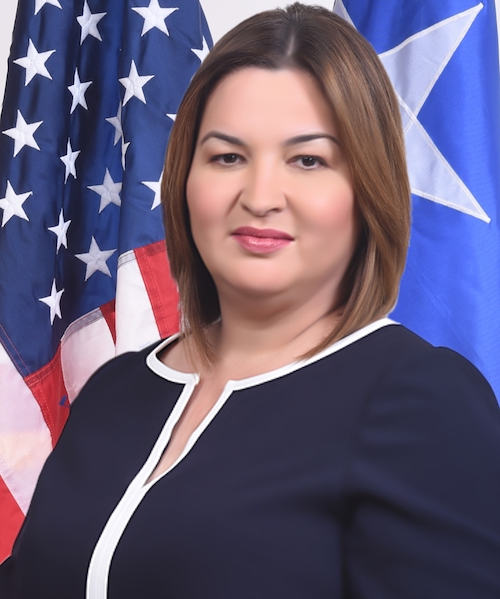
- González in 2021

Member of the Puerto Rico Senate from the Mayagüez district
- In office January 2, 2021 – December 31, 2024 Serving with Ada García Montes

Majority Whip of the Senate of Puerto Rico
- In office 2023–2024
- Preceded by: Gretchen Hau
- Succeeded by: Juan Morales Rodríguez

Personal details
- Born: Migdalia I. González Arroyo; August 4, 1973 (age 53) Añasco, Puerto Rico
- Party: Popular Democratic Party
- Education: University of Puerto Rico at Mayagüez (BA); Universidad del Este (MBA)

Migdalia I. González Arroyo (born August 4, 1973) is a Puerto Rican politician who served as a member of the Senate of Puerto Rico for district IV.

== Life ==
González was born August 4, 1973, in Añasco, Puerto Rico to Ernesto González Ernesto González Piña and Migdalia Arroyo Negroni. She earned a bachelor's degree in industrial microbiology at the University of Puerto Rico at Mayagüez. She also completed the teacher preparation program with a speciality in biology. González earned a M.B.A. with a specialization in strategic management and leadership from the Universidad del Este. She is currently completing a doctorate in the business development program with a specialization in human resources at the Interamerican University of Puerto Rico.

She worked for the Puerto Rico Department of Education. She later served as the regional administrator for the CRIM - Mayagüez. A member of the Popular Democratic Party (PPD), she was elected November 3, 2020 and took office in 2021. In February 2023, she announced her campaign to be the second vice president of the PPD.

Senate of Puerto Rico
Preceded by Gretchen Hau	Majority Whip of the Puerto Rico Senate; 2023–2024	Succeeded by Juan Morales Rodríguez
