= Elizabeth Rosa Vélez =

Puerto Rican politician

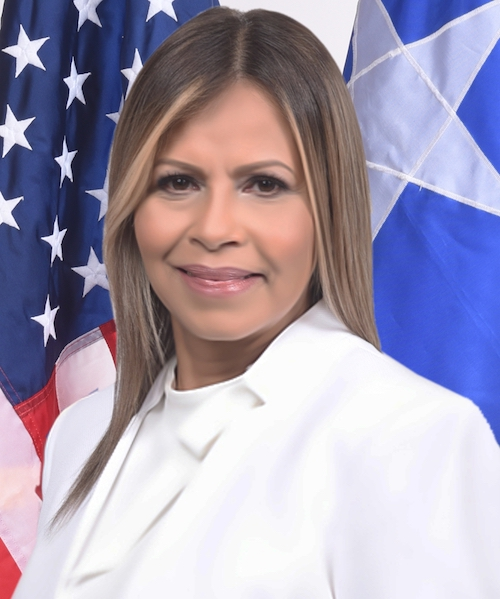
- Rosa Vélez in 2021

Member of the Puerto Rico Senate from the Arecibo district
- In office January 2, 2021 – December 31, 2024 Serving with Rubén Soto Rivera
- Preceded by: Ángel Martínez; José Pérez Rosa

Personal details
- Born: May 17 Arecibo, Puerto Rico
- Party: Popular Democratic Party
- Children: 3
- Education: Pontifical Catholic University of Puerto Rico (BA)

Elizabeth Rosa Vélez is a Puerto Rican politician serving as a member of the Senate of Puerto Rico from district III since 2021.

== Life ==
Rosa Vélez was born May 17 in Arecibo, Puerto Rico to Dima Rosa and María Vélez. She is the fifth of seven children. She graduated from Escuela Superior Dra. María Cadilla de Martínez. She earned a bachelor's degree in liberal arts with a concentration in criminal justice and psychology at the Pontifical Catholic University of Puerto Rico in Arecibo. Rosa Vélez completed a master in clinical social work.

Rosa Vélez was the programmatic director of the Puerto Rico Department of Corrections and Rehabilitation. She served as the director of the regional department of natural resources and the environment in the Arecibo district. A member of the Popular Democratic Party, she has served as a member of the Senate of Puerto Rico from district III since 2021.

Rosa Vélez has three children.
