= Joanne Rodríguez Veve =

Puerto Rican politician

Joanne Marie Rodríguez Veve
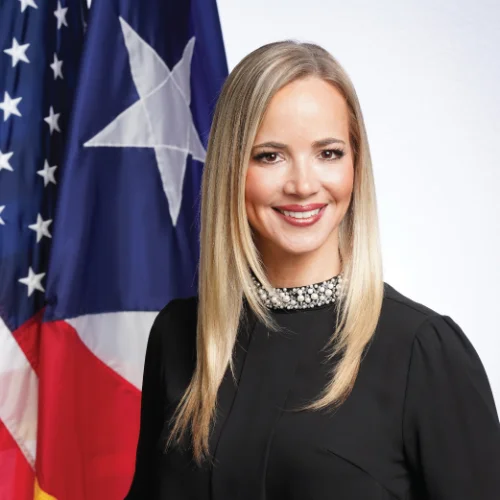
- Rodríguez Veve in 2025

Member of the Puerto Rico Senate from the at-large district
- Incumbent
- Assumed office January 2, 2021
- Preceded by: Position established

Personal details
- Born: February 3, 1983 (age 43) San Juan, Puerto Rico
- Party: Independent
- Children: 2
- Education: University of Puerto Rico, Río Piedras Campus (BA; JD); Pontifical University of Salamanca (LLM)
- Occupation: Politician; lawyer

Joanne Marie Rodríguez Veve (San Juan, Puerto Rico; born February 3, 1983) is a Puerto Rican politician and lawyer. She currently serves as at-large senator at the 28th Senate of Puerto Rico (2025–2029). She was elected during the 2020 Puerto Rico Senate election and is the first senator of the party.

== Education ==
Rodriguez graduated from high school from Colegio Marista Guaynabo in 2001. She earned a Bachelor's Degree in Political Science and a Juris Doctor from the University of Puerto Rico, Río Piedras Campus. Then she completed a Master's Degree in Canon law from the Pontifical University of Salamanca in Spain, and has studied History of Puerto Rico at the Center for Advanced Studies on Puerto Rico and the Caribbean

== Professional career ==
She has worked as a lawyer for ecclesiastical processes of matrimonial nullity and in the Human Resources field, specializing in labor matters management.

In 2020, she announced that she would be running for a seat at the Senate of Puerto Rico at-large under the Proyecto Dignidad party. She ended up at second place with 88,716 (7.33%) votes and was sworn in as Senator on January 2, 2021 with the rest of the elected senators.
