= Keren Riquelme =

Puerto Rican politician

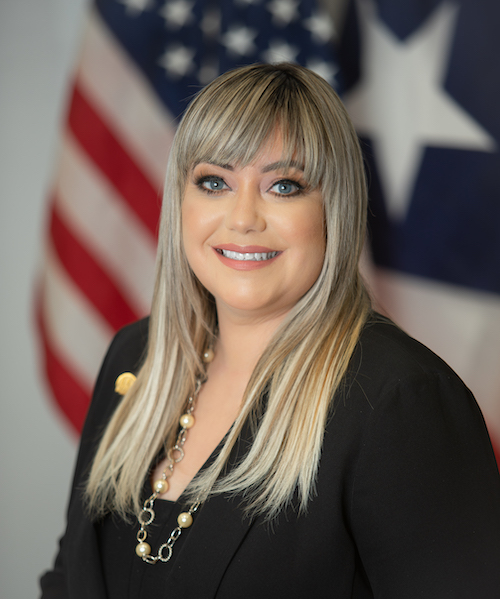
- Riquelme in 2020

Member of the Puerto Rico Senate from the at-large district
- In office September 8, 2020 – January 2, 2025
- Preceded by: Aníbal José Torres

Personal details
- Born: Keren L. Riquelme Cabrera Arecibo, Puerto Rico
- Party: New Progressive
- Other political affiliations: Republican
- Education: University of Puerto Rico at Mayagüez (BA); Vision International University (DBA)

Keren L. Riquelme Cabrera is a Puerto Rican politician serving as a member at-large of the Senate of Puerto Rico.

== Life ==
She earned a Bachelor in languages from University of Puerto Rico at Mayagüez and a Doctor of Business Administration from Vision International University in Euless, Texas. A member of the New Progressive Party, Riquelme was elected in 2020, defeating Aníbal José Torres. Before been a senator she was a professor in the University of Puerto Rico at Aguadilla. In 2022, she presented a plan to stop the exodus of medical doctors from the island.

On August 14, 2025, Keren Riquelme was appointed by governor Jenniffer González as Director for the Office for Socioeconomic and Community Development.

Riquelme is the daughter of pastor and science teacher Carmen G. Cabrera.
