= Ana Irma Rivera Lassén =

Afro-Puerto Rican attorney (born 1955)

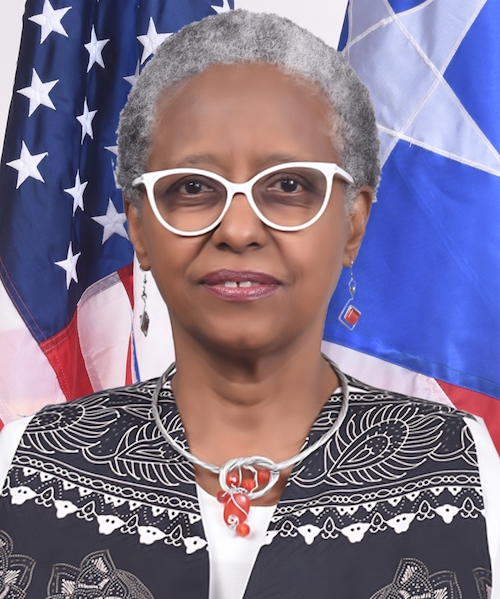
- Rivera Lassén in 2021

Member of Puerto Rico Senate from at-large district
- In office January 2, 2021 – January 2, 2025

Personal details
- Born: March 13, 1955 (age 71) San Juan, Puerto Rico
- Party: Citizens' Victory Movement
- Education: University of Puerto Rico, Río Piedras (BA, JD)

Ana Irma Rivera Lassén (born March 13, 1955) is an Afro-Puerto Rican attorney who is a former Member of the Puerto Rican Senate, she also served as the head of the Bar Association of Puerto Rico from 2012 to 2014. She was the first black woman, and third female, to head the organization. She is a feminist and human rights activist, who is also openly lesbian. She has received many awards and honors for her work in the area of women's rights and human rights, including the Capetillo-Roqué Medal from the Puerto Rican Senate, the Martin Luther King/Arturo Alfonso Schomburg Prize, and the Nilita Vientós Gastón Medal. She is a practicing attorney and serves on the faculty of several universities in Puerto Rico; she currently serves on the Advisory Committee on Access to Justice of the Puerto Rican Judicial Branch.

== Early life ==
Ana Irma Rivera Lassén was born on 13 March 1955 in Santurce, San Juan, Puerto Rico to Ana Irma Lassén and Eladio Rivera Quiñones, who were both educators. At the age of sixteen, she became involved with feminism, joining the Comité de Mujeres Puertorriqueñas (Puerto Rican Women's Committee) and then helping to found the Mujer Integrate Ahora (MIA) (Women Integrate Now) organization in 1972. She attended the Juan José Osuna de Hato Rey High School in San Juan and then began Hispanic studies at the University of Puerto Rico, Río Piedras Campus in 1971. Bored with that course of study, she changed to general humanities and graduated with a Bachelor of Arts. She was one of the founders of the Poetry Workshop led by Luis A. Rosario Quiles and Joserramón Meléndez at the university. She obtained her Juris Doctor degree at the same university.

== Career ==
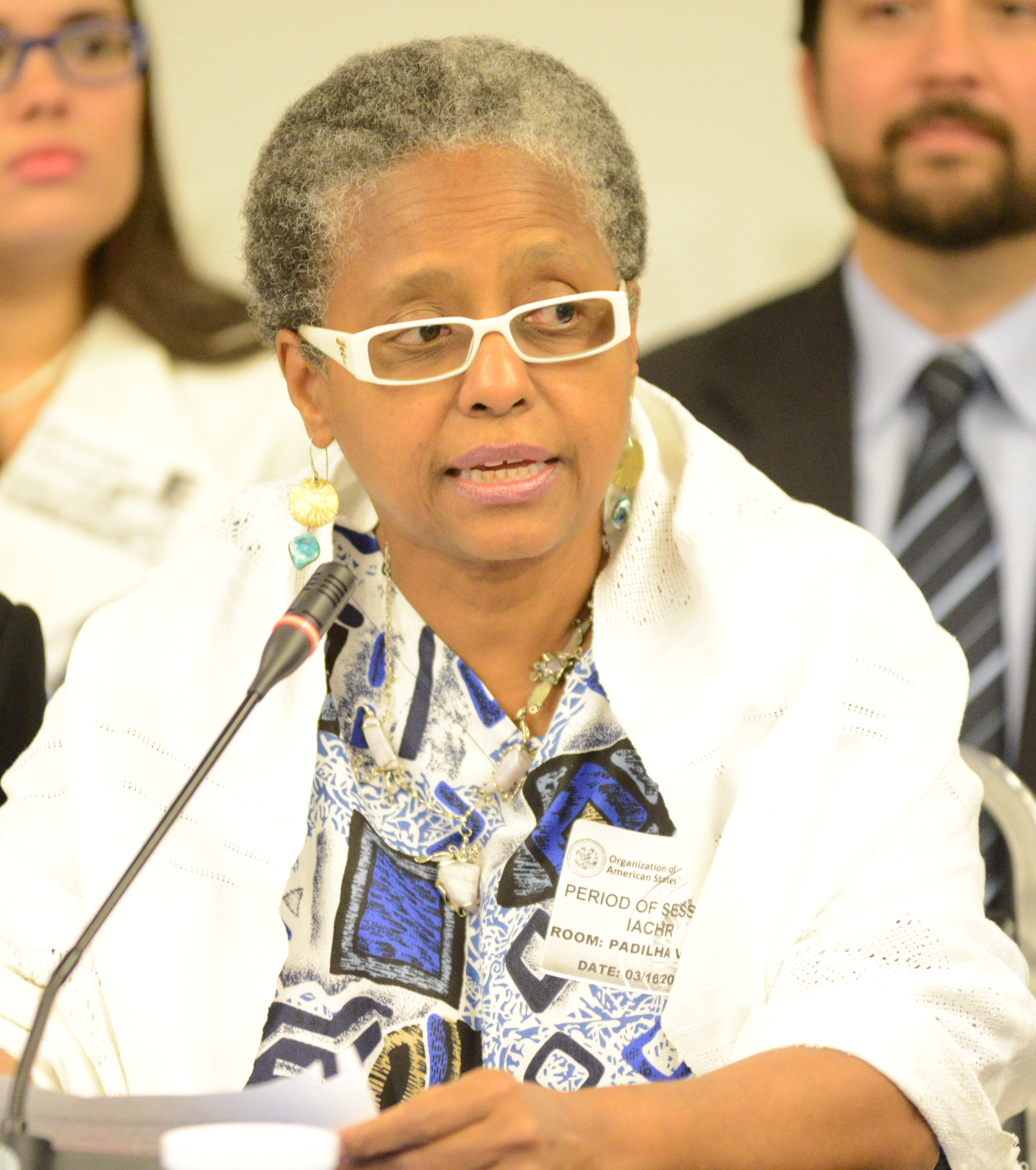
Rivera Lassén in 2015

In 1974, Rivera co-founded and edited the feminist publication El tacón de la chancleta (The heel of the flip-flop). Originally it was published as part of the journal Avance, but was independently published the following year. It was the organ of the MIA, but had an independent editorial board. Rivera has published essays, poems, and newspaper articles in various publications, including: Avance, La Hora, Luna Nueva, Poemario de la mujer puertorriqueña, El Reportero, La sapa, Sin Nombre, El tacón de la chancleta, Zse, Zse, and El arte de morir y la pequeña muerte by Nemir Matos-Cintrón. In 1984, she published a regular column in El Reportero entitled "La mujer de siglo XXI" (Women of the 21st Century) and in 1988 co-founded the magazine Luna Nueva as a vehicle for Feministas en Marcha (Feminists on the March), for which she had been serving as spokesperson since 1983.

Rivera's legal career has focused on human rights law, including discrimination, gender violence, and socio-economic and cultural rights. Having faced discrimination personally, her goal was to protect others. In the 1980s, she was not allowed to enter court in pants and was told to wear a skirt. She sued the judge and won. In 1993, her testimony regarding rights violations and police dossiers kept on feminists in Puerto Rico was one of the presentations at the United Nations World Conference on Human Rights. This history, which retells the events of the feminist movement in Puerto Rico and the Caribbean, was detailed in her book Documentos del Feminismo en Puerto Rico: Facsímiles de la Historia, co-written with Elizabeth Crespo Kebler.

In 2012, Rivera ran for and was elected as the third woman to preside as president of the Bar Association of Puerto Rico. She was the first Afro-Puerto Rican and first open lesbian to occupy the post. She defeated her opponent 948 to 341 for the two-year term. After her term ended, she returned to private practice and teaching. In 2015, she was actively involved in the assessment of a bill that proposed the merger of the Commission on Civil Rights and the offices of the Attorneys of Women of Persons with Disabilities, Elderly, Patients and Veterans into a single entity called the Department of Defense of Human Rights. The proposed new department was to cover legal issues on six target areas, including: aging, civil and constitutional rights, disability, gender equality, socio-economic parity, and veterans rights. In 2016 Rivera was appointed to serve on the Advisory Committee on Access to Justice of the Judicial Branch. In March 2024, the Citizen Victory Movement (CVM) selected Ana Irma Rivera Lassén as its candidate for Resident Commissioner of Puerto Rico in Washington DC. Rivera asked the PIP to grant one of the seats to the MVC, as part of the Minorities Act in the Puerto Rico Legislative Assembly.

== Awards and honors ==
Rivera has been recognized as an expert on gender, race, and human rights by the Gender Affairs Division of the United Nations Economic Commission for Latin America and the Caribbean. She is a member of the Latin American and the Caribbean Committee for the Defense of Women Rights (CLADEM). In 2003, Rivera was awarded the "Medalla Senatorial Capetillo-Roqué" from the Puerto Rican Senate for her contributions to women's rights in Puerto Rico. In 2006, she was the recipient of the "Martin Luther King/Arturo Alfonso Schomburg Prize" for her work against discrimination and for civil rights and the following year, received the Nilita Vientós Gastón Medal from the Puerto Rican Bar Association for her legal expertise. In 2009, Rivera was honored as the Collegiate of the Year.

Rivera was named as one of USA Today's Women of the Year in 2023, which recognizes women who have made a significant impact across the country.

== Selected works ==
- Rivera Lassén, Ana Irma (1987). Poesías: Programa Oficial Segundo Congreso Creación Femenina en el Mundo Hispánico (in Spanish). Puerto Rico: Universidad de Puerto Rico y la Fundación Puertorriqueña de las Humanidades. OCLC 27363594.
- Rivera Lassén, Ana Irma (1987). La organización de las mujeres y las organizaciones feministas en Puerto Rico (1930–1986) (Speech). (Conference manuscript) Universidad de Puerto Rico (in Spanish). San Juan, Puerto Rico.
- Rivera Lassén, Ana Irma; Crespo Kebler, Elizabeth (2001). Documentos del feminismo en Puerto Rico: facsímiles de la historia (in Spanish). Río Piedras, Puerto Rico: Editorial de la Universidad de Puerto Rico. ISBN 978-0-8477-0105-6.
- Rivera Lassén, Ana Irma (16 July 2010). Afrodescendant women: our gaze fixed on the intersections of race- and gender-based organizing (Report). Brasilia, Brazil: Network of Afro-Latin American, Afro-Caribbean and Diaspora Women. doi:10.13140/RG.2.1.2049.8644.
- Rivera Lassén, Ana Irma (16 July 2010). Mujeres afrodescendientes: la mirada trabada en las intersecciones de organización por raza y género (Report) (in Spanish). Brasilia, Brazil: Network of Afro-Latin American, Afro-Caribbean and Diaspora Women. doi:10.13140/RG.2.1.3098.4409.
- Rivera Lassén, Ana Irma (December 2011). "País de tránsito: por aquí pasa el llanto camino al dolor con mi niña en brazos". Rayuela (in Spanish) (5). Mexico City, Mexico: Revista Iberoamericana. ISSN 2007-5332. Archived from the original on 2019-12-28.
- Rivera Lassén, Ana Irma (2012). "Black Girls Ride Tricycles Too: Thoughts from the Identities of an Afro-descendent and Feminist Woman". In Vega, Marta Moreno; Alba, Marinieves; Modestin, Yvette (eds.). Women Warriors of the Afro-Latina Diaspora. Houston, Texas: Arte Publico Press. ISBN 978-1-55885-746-9.
