= Nitza Morán =

Puerto Rican politician (born 1970)

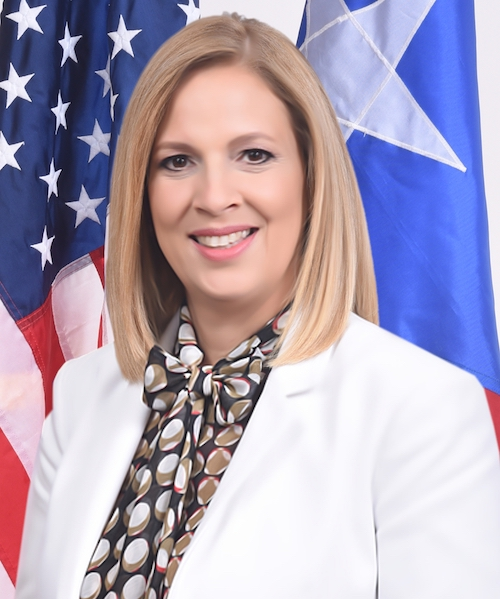
- Morán in 2021

Member of the Puerto Rico Senate from the San Juan district
- Incumbent
- Assumed office January 2, 2021 Serving with Juan Morales Rodríguez
- Preceded by: Miguel Romero

Personal details
- Born: Nitza Morán Trinidad; February 17, 1970 (age 56) San Juan, Puerto Rico
- Party: New Progressive Party
- Other political affiliations: Republican
- Education: Assumption University (BA); University of New Haven (MS)

Nitza Morán Trinidad (born February 17, 1970) is a Puerto Rican politician and businessperson serving in the Senate of Puerto Rico for district I since 2021. She is president of the Progressive Women of San Juan. Morán was the president of the Merchants Association of La Placita for 19 years.

== Life ==
Morán was born on February 17, 1970, in San Juan, Puerto Rico to Iris Maria Trinidad and Miguel Angel Morán. She graduated from a private high school in Santurce where she was a member of the National Honor Society. She was completed a bachelor's degree in biology at the Assumption University in Worcester, Massachusetts. She completed a master's degree in forensic science with a concentration in criminology and serology at the University of New Haven.

Morán worked at the Ponce Health Sciences University where she researched HIV. She returned to San Juan to join her family's businesses and became involved in the local business community around La Placita de Santurce. She was president of the Merchants Association of La Placita for 19 years. A member of the New Progressive Party, she was elected to the Senate of Puerto Rico in November 2020 to represent district I. She is president of the Progressive Women of San Juan. Morán is both Catholic and pro-choice.

In September 2025, she along with fellow senator Carmelo Ríos Santiago introduced Senate Resolution 286 "to evaluate the feasibility and impact of potentially repurposing Roosevelt Roads for national security by the Army" citing both regional security and the base's historical contribution to the local economy in terms of employment and revenues.
