= Puerto Rico senatorial district III =

Profile and election results

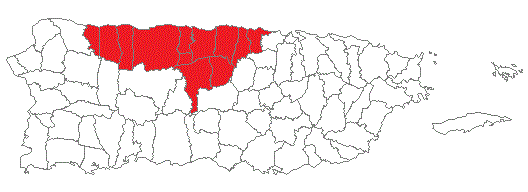
Map of Puerto Rico, highlighting senatorial district III

Puerto Rico senatorial district III, also known as the senatorial district of Arecibo, is one of the eight senatorial districts of Puerto Rico. It is currently represented by Elizabeth Rosa Vélez and Rubén Soto Rivera (both from the Popular Democratic Party).

== District profile ==
Senatorial district III has an approximate population of 470,250. It covers the following municipalities:

- Arecibo
- Barceloneta
- Camuy
- Ciales
- Dorado
- Florida
- Hatillo
- Manatí
- Quebradillas
- Vega Alta
- Vega Baja

In previous distributions, the territory covered by senatorial district III has changed. In 1983, the district included the municipalities of Isabela and Morovis. In the 1991 redistribution, Isabela was assigned to the district of Mayagüez and Morovis to the district of Guayama. Meanwhile Toa Alta was assigned to Arecibo.

In the 2002 redistribution, Morovis was reassigned to the district while Toa Alta was reassigned to the district of Bayamón.

== Election results ==
=== 2012 ===
Puerto Rican general election, 2012
Party	Candidate	Votes	%	±%
New Progressive Party (PNP)	Angel "Chayanne" Martínez	117,857	24.68	-1.53
New Progressive Party (PNP)	José "Joito" Pérez	117,297	24.56	—
Popular Democratic Party (PPD)	Wanda Arroyo	114,871	24.06	—
Popular Democratic Party (PPD)	Rubén Soto	112,674	23.60	—
Puerto Rican Independence Party (PIP)	Jaime Bonel González	5,314	1.11	+0.23
Puerto Rican Independence Party (PIP)	Luis Cruz	5,142	1.08	—
Movimiento Unión Soberanista (MUS)	Rafael Capella Angueira	1,735	0.36	—
Total votes		477,521	100	

=== 2008 ===
Puerto Rican general election, 2008
Party	Candidate	Votes	%	±%
New Progressive Party (PNP)	Angel "Chayanne" Martínez	129,333	26.21%	—
New Progressive Party (PNP)	José Emilio González	128,799	26.10	—
Popular Democratic Party (PPD)	María Elena Pérez	107,805	21.84	—
Popular Democratic Party (PPD)	Américo Martínez	106,009	21.48	—
Puerto Ricans for Puerto Rico Party (PPR)	José Radamés Fuentes	5,135	1.04	—
Puerto Ricans for Puerto Rico Party (PPR)	Antonio Fernández Santiago	5,034	1.02	—
Puerto Rican Independence Party (PIP)	Rubén Marín Miranda	4,380	0.89	—
Puerto Rican Independence Party (PIP)	Jaime Bonel González	4,350	0.88	—
Total votes		493,522	100.0	

=== 2004 ===
Puerto Rican general election, 2004
Party	Candidate	Votes	%	±%
New Progressive Party (PNP)	José Emilio González	123,570	24.81%	
New Progressive Party (PNP)	Víctor David Loubriel	123,503	24.80	
Popular Democratic Party (PPD)	Lucy Molinari	116,939	23.48	
Popular Democratic Party (PPD)	Rafael Rodríguez Vargas	114,861	23.06	
Puerto Rican Independence Party (PIP)	Damaris Mangual Vélez	9,074	1.82	
Puerto Rican Independence Party (PIP)	Josué Correa Colón	7,824	1.57	
Total votes		497,990	100.0	
