= Vargas Vidot =

Puerto Rican doctor of medicine, philanthropist, and politician

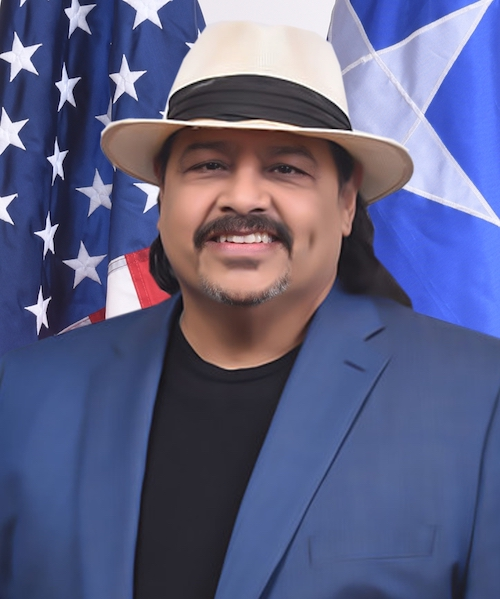

Member of Puerto Rican Senate from at-large district
- In office January 2, 2017 – January 2, 2025

Personal details
- Born: José Antonio Vargas Vidot; May 22, 1956 (age 70) San Juan, Puerto Rico
- Party: Independent
- Education: Universidad Eugenio María de Hostos (MD)
- Website: vargasvidot.com

José Antonio "Chaco" Vargas Vidot (born 22 May 1954), better known simply by his two last names Vargas Vidot, is a Puerto Rican physician focused on drug rehabilitation, philanthropist, and politician who served as a member of the Puerto Rico Senate from 2017 until 2025. His community service is channeled throughout his organization, Iniciativa Comunitaria (Community Initiative) which provides free health care to drug addicts in Puerto Rico. In 2016, Vargas Vidot became the first independent candidate elected to the Senate of Puerto Rico.

== Early life and education ==
José Vargas Vidot was born in San Juan, Puerto Rico. He was raised in the communities of La Perla and Puerta de Tierra. Vargas Vidot completed his pre-medical studies at the Interamerican University of Puerto Rico. In 1986, he obtained the degree of doctor of medicine in the school of Medicine of the Universidad Eugenio María de Hostos in Santo Domingo, Dominican Republic.

== Career ==
Near the end of the 1980s, José Vargas Vidot worked for the public health system, in the Immunology Center of the Family Health Center in Cataño. From 1986 to 1991, he worked as coordinator of experimental clinical trials, while also collaborating with the Office for AIDS Affairs. He was also part of an investigation program destined to define the prevalence of the illness in Puerto Rico. In 1990, Vargas Vidot and a group of AIDS patients started a project to educate fellow patients about alternative treatment.

== Political career ==
In 2015, Vargas Vidot announced he would run for the Senate of Puerto Rico. On November 8, 2016 Vargas Vidot was elected as the first independent senator in the history of Puerto Rico with a total of 157,788 votes, garnering the most votes of any legislative candidate for a total of 10.76% of the votes.
