= Marissa Jiménez =

Puerto Rican politician

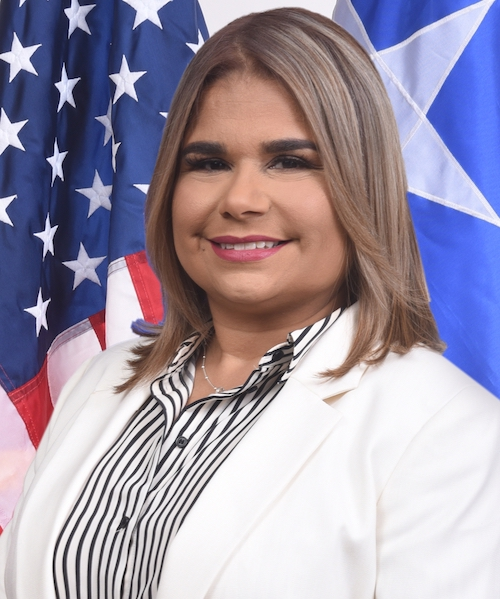
- Jiménez in 2021

Member of the Puerto Rico Senate from the Carolina district
- Incumbent
- Assumed office January 2, 2021 Serving with Javier Aponte Dalmau

Personal details
- Born: Marissa Jiménez Santoni; February 18, 1979 (age 47) Arecibo, Puerto Rico
- Party: New Progressive Party
- Other political affiliations: Democratic
- Children: 3
- Education: Universidad Metropolitana (B.Ed., MBA)

Marissa Jiménez Santoni (born February 18, 1979) is a Puerto Rican politician serving as a member of the Senate of Puerto Rico for district VIII.

== Life ==
Marissa Jiménez Santoni was born February 18, 1979, in Arecibo, Puerto Rico. She was raised by her mother, Martiza Santoni and her maternal grandparents, Emilio and Awilda. She attended Escuela Segunda Unidad de Río Arriba and later Luz América Calderón high school in Carolina. Jiménez was interested in politics at a young age and joined the youth New Progressive Party as an adolescent and at 14, she was elected a municipal vice president. At 18 years old, she was a college official and she voted for the first time in the 1998 Puerto Rican status referendum. She completed a B.Ed. with a concentration preschool and primary education. She earned a M.B.A., magna cum laude, with a speciality in management and human resources from the Ana G. Méndez University.

Jiménez was an election commissioner in 2000, 2008, and 2016 and an election coordinator in 2004 in Carolina Precinct 107. She was director of the Carolina region of get out the vote. Jiménez is a member of the Organización de Servidores Públicos. Jiménez worked in the private sector in client services. In the public sector, she was a special advisor to the House of Representatives of Puerto Rico from 2009 to 2010. She worked in customer service for the Puerto Rico Electric Power Authority from 2012 to 2016. At the Puerto Rico Administración de Compensación por Accidentes Automovilísticos, she has served in various roles including regional director, executive advisor, and manager of operations.

In the general election on November 3, 2020, Jiménez was elected senator for district VIII. She assumed the office on January 2, 2021. She has advocated for women's rights.

Jiménez is married to Juan Valentín Nieves and they have three children. They are members of the Bautista Luz de Salvación church in Carolina, Puerto Rico.
