= Puerto Rico senatorial district IV =

Profile and election results

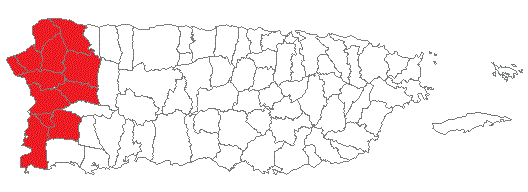
Map of Puerto Rico, highlighting senatorial district IV

Puerto Rico senatorial district IV, also known as the senatorial district of Mayagüez-Aguadilla, is one of the eight senatorial districts of Puerto Rico. It is currently represented by Ada García Montes and Migdalia González.

== District profile ==
Evolution of senatorial district IV

Senatorial district IV has an approximate population of 478,194. It covers the following municipalities:

- Aguada
- Aguadilla
- Añasco
- Cabo Rojo
- Hormigueros
- Isabela
- Las Marías
- Mayagüez
- Moca
- Rincón
- San Germán
- San Sebastián

In previous distributions, the territory covered by senatorial district IV has changed. In 1972 and 1983, the district included the municipalities of Lajas and Maricao. In the 1991 redistribution, both were assigned to the district of Ponce, while Isabela was reassigned to the district.

The district hasn't suffered changes in the recent redistributions of 2002 and 2011.

== Election results ==
=== 2012 ===
Puerto Rican general election, 2012
Party	Candidate	Votes	%	±%
Popular Democratic Party (PPD)	María Teresa González	125,353	26.55	—
Popular Democratic Party (PPD)	Gilberto Rodríguez	121,396	25.71	—
New Progressive Party (PNP)	Luis Daniel Muñíz	105,666	22.38	-3.31
New Progressive Party (PNP)	Evelyn Vázquez	103,042	21.82	-3.59
Puerto Rican Independence Party (PIP)	Orlando Ruíz Pesante	5,594	1.18	—
Puerto Rican Independence Party (PIP)	Samuel Soto Bosques	5,483	1.16	-0.57
Movimiento Unión Soberanista (MUS)	Alberto O. Lozada Colón	1,461	0.33	—
Worker's People Party of Puerto Rico (PPT)	Edwin Morales Pérez	1,112	0.24	—
Total votes		472,183	100	

=== 2008 ===
Puerto Rican general election, 2008
Party	Candidate	Votes	%	±%
New Progressive Party (PNP)	Luis Daniel Muñiz	125,731	25.69%	+1.17
New Progressive Party (PNP)	Evelyn Vázquez	124,329	25.41	—
Popular Democratic Party (PPD)	Sergio Ortíz Quiñones	107,399	21.95	—
Popular Democratic Party (PPD)	Enid Toro de Báez	107,091	21.88	—
Puerto Ricans for Puerto Rico Party (PPR)	Yesenia García Vélez	5,699	1.16	—
Puerto Rican Independence Party (PIP)	Reynaldo Acevedo Vélez	5,543	1.13	—
Puerto Rican Independence Party (PIP)	Ubaldo M. Soto Miranda	5,230	1.07	—
Puerto Ricans for Puerto Rico Party (PPR)	Aníbal Nieves	5,158	1.05	—
Total votes		489,349	100.0	

=== 2004 ===
Puerto Rican general election, 2004
Party	Candidate	Votes	%	±%
New Progressive Party (PNP)	Luis Daniel Muñiz	124,922	24.52%	—
New Progressive Party (PNP)	Carlos Pagán	121,911	23.93	+1.53
Popular Democratic Party (PPD)	Jorge Ramos Vélez	121,044	23.76	—
Popular Democratic Party (PPD)	Rafael Irizarry	120,783	23.71	-0.39
Puerto Rican Independence Party (PIP)	Jorge Schmidt Nieto	9,355	1.84	—
Puerto Rican Independence Party (PIP)	Samuel Soto Bosques	8,817	1.73	—
Total votes		509,485	100.0	
