= Puerto Rico senatorial district II =

Profile and election results

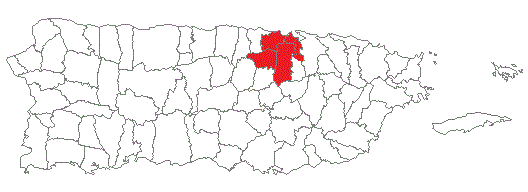
Map of Puerto Rico, highlighting senatorial district II

Puerto Rico senatorial district II, also known as the senatorial district of Bayamón, is one of the eight senatorial districts of Puerto Rico. It is currently represented by Migdalia Padilla and Carmelo Ríos Santiago (both from the New Progressive Party).

== District profile ==
Senatorial district II covers the municipalities of Bayamón, Cataño, Toa Alta, Toa Baja, and some regions of Guaynabo. It has an approximate population of 459,805.

In previous distributions, the territory covered by senatorial district II has changed. Originally, the district included both Toa Alta and Toa Baja, but in the 1991 redistribution, Toa Alta was assigned to the district of Arecibo.

In the 2002 redistribution, Toa Alta was reassigned to the district, but some regions of Guaynabo were assigned to the district of San Juan.

== Election results ==
=== 2012 ===
Puerto Rican general election, 2012
Party	Candidate	Votes	%	±%
New Progressive Party (PNP)	Migdalia Padilla	106,133	25.73	-2.31
New Progressive Party (PNP)	Carmelo Ríos Santiago	106,125	25.73	-1.90
Popular Democratic Party (PPD)	Miguel Reyes Dávila	90,123	21.85	—
Popular Democratic Party (PPD)	José Orlando Muñoz	89,939	21.80	—
Puerto Rican Independence Party (PIP)	Víctor M. Caraballo	6,494	1.57	—
Puerto Rican Independence Party (PIP)	José A. Ojeda Santos	5,806	1.41	—
Movimiento Unión Soberanista (MUS)	Carlos Alberto Velázquez	2,598	0.63	—
Worker's People Party of Puerto Rico (PPT)	Ruth E. Arroyo Muñoz	2,559	0.62	—
Total votes		412,484	100	

=== 2008 ===
Puerto Rican general election, 2008
Party	Candidate	Votes	%	±%
New Progressive Party (PNP)	Migdalia Padilla	122,265	28.04	+1.58
New Progressive Party (PNP)	Carmelo Ríos Santiago	120,462	27.63	+1.57
Popular Democratic Party (PPD)	Ivette Grajales	86,452	19.83	—
Popular Democratic Party (PPD)	Georgie Cases	85,526	19.62	—
Puerto Ricans for Puerto Rico Party (PPR)	Angel R. De Jesús Ortega	7,984	1.83	—
Puerto Rican Independence Party (PIP)	Gladys Rivera Rodríguez	5,633	1.29	—
Puerto Rican Independence Party (PIP)	Benedicto Colón Pérez	5,601	1.28	—
Total votes		435,993	100.0	

=== 2004 ===
Puerto Rican general election, 2004
Party	Candidate	Votes	%	±%
New Progressive Party (PNP)	Migdalia Padilla	118,524	26.46	+1.66
New Progressive Party (PNP)	Carmelo Ríos Santiago	116,703	26.06	—
Popular Democratic Party (PPD)	Jorge Zapata	93,931	20.97	—
Popular Democratic Party (PPD)	Harry Aponte Rivera	93,028	20.77	—
Puerto Rican Independence Party (PIP)	José E. Marrero	11,831	2.64	—
Puerto Rican Independence Party (PIP)	Mario Maldonado Ramírez	11,768	2.63	—
Total votes		447,865	100.0	
