= Wanda Soto Tolentino =

Puerto Rican politician

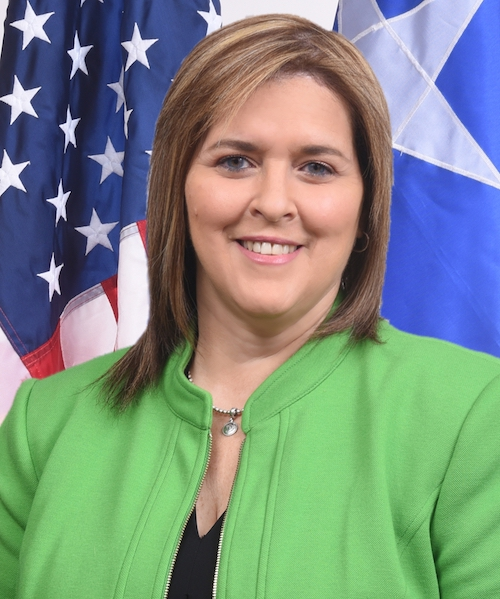
- Soto in 2021

Member of the Puerto Rico Senate from the Humacao district
- Incumbent
- Assumed office January 2, 2021

Personal details
- Born: Wanda M. Soto Tolentino; June 4 Humacao, Puerto Rico
- Party: New Progressive Party
- Education: University of Puerto Rico at Humacao (BBA)

Wanda Milagros Soto Tolentino (born June 4) is a Puerto Rican politician serving as a member of the Senate of Puerto Rico for district VII.

== Life ==
Soto was born June 4 in Humacao, Puerto Rico to Juan A. Soto Díaz and Sonia Tolentino Torres. She completed elementary and high school in Las Piedras, Puerto Rico. She earned a B.B.A. in business administration with a concentration in management and human resources from the University of Puerto Rico at Humacao.

In 2002, she was director and accountant of the Las Piedras center for the aged. A musician, she recorded a record, "Con eterno Amor" in 2004. Her second recording, "Trayectoria" was released alongside her first book, Lágrimas detrás del Púlpito. In 2011, she was director of the legislative office of senator Itzamar Peña Ramírez. For seven years, she directed the division of rural operations of a bank.

In the general election on November 3, 2020, Soto, a member of the New Progressive Party, was elected senator for district VII. She assumed the office on January 2, 2021. Her district was among those damaged by Hurricane Fiona in 2022.
