= Puerto Rico senatorial district V =

Profile and election results

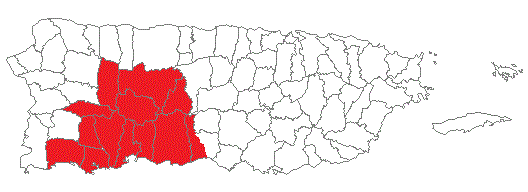
Map of Puerto Rico, highlighting senatorial district V

Puerto Rico senatorial district V, also known as the senatorial district of Ponce, is one of the eight senatorial districts of Puerto Rico. It is currently represented by Marially González Huertas and Ramón Ruiz Nieves (both from the Popular Democratic Party).

== District profile ==
Senatorial district V has an approximate population of 464,962. It covers the following municipalities:

- Adjuntas
- Guánica
- Guayanilla
- Jayuya
- Lajas
- Lares
- Maricao
- Peñuelas
- Ponce
- Sabana Grande
- Utuado
- Yauco
- and some regions of Juana Díaz

In previous distributions, the territory covered by senatorial district V has changed. In 1972, the district didn't include the municipality of Jayuya, which was annexed during the 1983 redistribution. Also, in 1972 and 1983 the district didn't include the municipalities of Lajas, Maricao or Juana Díaz. However, in the 1991 redistribution, both Lajas and Maricao were assigned to the district.

The district didn't suffer changes in the redistribution of 2002, but some regions of Juana Díaz were added in the redistribution of 2011.

== Election results ==
=== 2012 ===
Puerto Rican general election, 2012
Party	Candidate	Votes	%	±%
Popular Democratic Party (PPD)	Ramón Ruiz	113,499	24.43	—
Popular Democratic Party (PPD)	Martín Vargas Morales	112,974	24.32	—
New Progressive Party (PNP)	Luis Berdiel	111,806	24.07	-1.44
New Progressive Party (PNP)	Eliezer Velázquez	111,454	23.99	—
Puerto Rican Independence Party (PIP)	Luis Enrique Martínez	6,246	1.34	—
Puerto Rican Independence Party (PIP)	Javier Maldonado Mercado	5,972	1.29	—
Total votes		464,546	100	

=== 2008 ===
Puerto Rican general election, 2008
Party	Candidate	Votes	%	±%
New Progressive Party (PNP)	Larry Seilhamer	116,666	25.69%	—
New Progressive Party (PNP)	Luis Berdiel	115,857	25.51	—
Popular Democratic Party (PPD)	Rafael Santiago Pereles	102,316	22.53	—
Popular Democratic Party (PPD)	José Luis Galarza	101,509	22.35	—
Puerto Rican Independence Party (PIP)	Luis E. Rodríguez Santiago	5,243	1.15	—
Puerto Rican Independence Party (PIP)	Oscar Castellón	5,062	1.11	—
Puerto Ricans for Puerto Rico Party (PPR)	Raúl Morris	4,704	1.04	—
Total votes		454,114	100.0	

=== 2004 ===
Puerto Rican general election, 2004
Party	Candidate	Votes	%	±%
Popular Democratic Party (PPD)	Modesto Agosto Alicea	115,866	24.60%	-0.70
Popular Democratic Party (PPD)	Bruno Ramos	115,302	24.48	-0.62
New Progressive Party (PNP)	María "Mayita" Meléndez	109,322	23.21	—
New Progressive Party (PNP)	Linnette Toledo	108,846	23.11	—
Puerto Rican Independence Party (PIP)	Myrna Rodríguez Lugo	9,823	2.09	—
Puerto Rican Independence Party (PIP)	Luis Varela Ortíz	9,578	2.03	—
Total votes		470,955	100.0	
