= Carmelo Ríos Santiago =

Puerto Rican politician

Carmelo Ríos
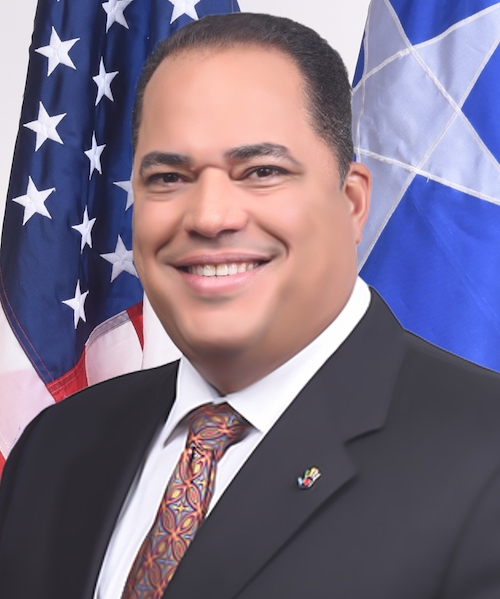

President pro tempore of the Puerto Rico Senate
- Incumbent
- Assumed office January 2, 2025
- Preceded by: Marially González Huertas

Majority Leader of the Puerto Rico Senate
- In office January 2, 2017 – January 2, 2021
- Preceded by: Aníbal José Torres
- Succeeded by: Javier Aponte Dalmau

Member of the Puerto Rico Senate from the 2nd district
- Incumbent
- Assumed office January 2, 2005
- Preceded by: Pablo Lafontaine

Secretary General of the New Progressive Party
- In office February 4, 2021 – August 18, 2023

Personal details
- Born: Carmelo Javier Ríos Santiago; May 21, 1973 (age 53) Santurce, Puerto Rico
- Party: New Progressive
- Other political affiliations: Democratic
- Education: Valencia College (AS); Bethune-Cookman University (BA); Pontifical Catholic University of Puerto Rico (JD)

Carmelo Javier Ríos Santiago (born May 21, 1973, in San Juan, Puerto Rico) is a Puerto Rican politician, lawyer and senator. He has been a member of the Senate of Puerto Rico since 2005.

== Early years and studies ==
Carmelo Ríos was born on May 21, 1973, in Santurce, Puerto Rico to Carmelo Ríos Nazario and Lydia Santiago Estrella. He studied at the Ramón Marín Elementary School in Guaynabo and in 1991, he entered Florida Air Academy in Melbourne, Florida.

That same year, he started his college studies in Orlando, receiving an associate degree in economy from Valencia Community College. In 1993, he transferred to Bethune-Cookman University in Daytona Beach, Florida, where he obtained a bachelor's degree in political science and economy. Completed a Juris Doctor from the Pontifical Catholic University of Puerto Rico School of Law.

== Professional career ==
Ríos started working as a lawyer, and as a legal aide of the Commissioner of Municipal Affairs, and director of the Lawsuit Division of the Corporation of State Insurance Fund. In 2001, he started his own law firm specializing in administrative, civil, and penal law.

== Political career ==
Ríos started his political career in 1999, when he ran for Guaynabo's legislative assembly, where he was elected majority speaker. In November 2004, he was elected as Senator for the District of Bayamón, where he presided the Municipal and Financial Affairs Commission.

In November 2008, he was reelected for a second term. He presided the Government Commission. He was also vice-president of the Commission of Municipal Affairs, secretary of the Commission of Public Safety and Judicial Affairs, Consumer Affairs and Public Corporations during his first years. He was reelected in 2012 and 2016.

He currently presides the Commission of Rules and Calendars.

Carmelo Ríos ran for mayor of Guaynabo on August 5, 2017, in a special election to replace former mayor Hector O'Neill, but lost against Angel Perez.

In 2018, Ríos was selected to be president of the National Hispanic Caucus of State Legislators.

In 2020, he was elected as an at-large member of the Democratic Party of Puerto Rico.

In September 2025, he an fellow senators Nitza Morán Trinidad introduced Senate Resolution 286 "to evaluate the feasibility and impact of potentially repurposing Roosevelt Roads for national security by the Army" citing both regional security and the base's historical contribution to the local economy in terms of employment and revenues.

Senate of Puerto Rico
Preceded by Aníbal José Torres	Majority Leader of the Puerto Rico Senate; 2017–2021	Succeeded by Javier Aponte Dalmau
Preceded by Marially González Huertas	President pro tempore of the Puerto Rico Senate; 2025–present	Incumbent
