= List of former members of the Senate of Puerto Rico =

This is a list of former members of the Senate of Puerto Rico, organized by political party affiliation and senatorial district. The Senate of Puerto Rico is the upper chamber of the Legislative Assembly of Puerto Rico.

== Notable former senators ==
- Yldefonso Solá Morales (1941–1949)
- Santos P. Amadeo the "Champion of Habeas Corpus"
- Rubén Berríos Martínez (1973–1977,1985–1989,1993–2000) PIP-At Large (long-time political activist for the Puerto Rican independence movement, current president of the PIP party)
- Ruth Fernández (1973–1981), PPD-At Large (Puerto Rican Singer)
- Luis A. Ferré (1977–1984), PNP At-large, Eighth President of the Senate, third elected Governor
- Charles H. Juliá
- Fernando Martín García (1989–1993, 2001–2005) PIP-At Large
- Kenneth McClintock (1993–2008) "PNP-At Large", Thirteenth President of the Senate (2005-2008), 22nd Secretary of State (2009-2013)
- Luis Muñoz Marín (1941–48, 1965–70), PPD, Fourth President of the Senate, first elected Governor
- Victoria Muñoz Mendoza (1986–1993) PPD-At Large, former PPD 1992 gubernatorial candidate (daughter of Luis Muñoz Marín)
- Luis Negrón López, former PPD 1968 gubernatorial candidate, Senate Majority Leader and Vice President
- Héctor O'Neill García (1989–1993) PNP-Bayamón (former mayor of Guaynabo)
- Miriam J.Ramirez de Ferrer (2000-2004) "PNP- At Large",
- Ramón Luis Rivera Cruz (1993–2001) PNP-Bayamón (current mayor of Bayamón)
- Pedro Rosselló González (2005–2009), PNP-Arecibo, former Governor
- Jorge Santini Padilla (1997–2001) PNP-San Juan (former mayor of San Juan)
- Alfonso Valdés Cobián

== Former senators ==
The following is a list of former senators of Puerto Rico, along with their years of service and the senatorial district they represented.

New Progressive Party

- Roberto Arango
  (2005-2011) San Juan
- Carmen Luz Berríos Rivera
  (1997–2001) Guayama
- Calixto Calero Juarbe
  (1977–1984) "At Large"
- Norma Carranza de León
  (1993–2001, 2003–2005) Arecibo
- David Cruz Vélez
  (1989–1993) At Large
- Carlos Dávila López
  (1997–2001) Humacao
- Jorge De Castro Font
  (2004-2008) "At Large"
- Carlos Díaz
  (2004-2008) "At Large"
- Luis A. Ferré
  (1976–1980) "At Large"
- José Garriga Picó
  (2005-2009) At Large
- Mario Gaztambide
  (1969-1972) Bayamón
- Francisco González Rodríguez
  (1997–2001) San Juan
- Roger Iglesias
  (1993–2001, 2011–present) Carolina
- Luisa Lebrón Burgos
  (1993–2000) Carolina
- Miguel Loiz Zayas
  (1993–1997) Humacao
- Danny López Soto
  (1976–1984) Carolina
- Víctor Loubriel Ortiz
  (Jan. 2-4 2005) Arecibo
- Víctor Marrero Padilla
  (1993–2000) Arecibo
- Aníbal Marrero Pérez
  (1984–2000) Bayamón
- Héctor Martínez Maldonado
  (2005-2011) Carolina
- Héctor Martínez Colón
  (1969–1973) "Ponce"
- Kenneth McClintock
  (1993–2008) "At Large"
- José E. Meléndez Ortiz
  (1993–2001) Guayama
- Luis Felipe Navas de León
  (1993–2000) Humacao
- Nicolás Nogueras
  (1973–1985, 1989–1996) At Large
- Carlos Pagán
  (1997-2001, 2005-2009) Mayagüez
- Orlando Parga
  (1999-2008) At Large
- Sergio Peña Clos
  (1981–2005) At Large
- Miriam Ramírez de Ferrer
  (2001-2005) At Large
- Oreste Ramos Díaz
  (1977–1997) San Juan
- Roberto Rexach Benítez
  (1985–1998) At Large
- Luis Rivera Brenes
  (1977–1980) At Large
- Rubén Rivera Ramos
  (1969–1972) Bayamón
- Charles Rodríguez Colón
  (1993–2001) At Large
- Rafael Rodríguez González
  (1993–1997) Mayagüez
- Enrique Rodríguez Negrón
  (1989–2001) At Large
- Rolando Silva Iglesias
  (1981–1996) San Juan
- Antonio Soto Díaz
  (2008-2011) Guayama
- Angel Tirado Martínez
  (2000–2001) Arecibo
- Freddy Valentín Acevedo
  (1993–1997) At Large
- Luis Felipe Vázquez Ortiz
  (1996–1997) San Juan
- Dennis Vélez Barlucea
  (1993–1997) Ponce
- Eduardo Zavála Vázquez
  (1993–1997) Ponce

Popular Democratic Party

- Modesto Agosto Alicea
  (1997-2005) Ponce
- Eudaldo Báez Galib
  (1993-2005) At Large
- Eduardo Bhatia Gautier
  (1997–2001, 2009-) At Large
- Bartolomé Bonet Fussá
  (1946) Mayagüez
- Palmira Cabrera de Ibarra
  (1960–1968) Arecibo
- Elsie Calderón
  (1985–1993) Carolina
- Juan Cancel Ríos
  (1969–1976) "Arecibo"
- Juan Cancel Alegría
  (2001–2005) Carolina
- Felipe Colón Díaz
  (1941–1944) Ponce
- Miguel Deynes Soto
  (1973–1993) Mayagüez-Aguadilla
- Carlos García Portela
  (1965–1968) "San Juan"
- Velda González de Modestti
  (1981–2005) At Large
- Ana Nisi Goyco Graciani
  (1981–1993) Ponce
- Miguel Hernández Agosto
  (1970–1997) At Large
- Sixto Hernández Serrano
  (2001–2006) Humacao
- Rafael Irizarry
  (2000–2005) Mayagüez-Aguadilla
- Luis Izquierdo Mora
  (1981–1993) At Large
- Rafael Martí Nuñez
  (1973–1976) Humacao
- Américo Martínez
  (1981–1993) Arecibo
- Yasmín Mejías Lugo
  (2001–2005) Carolina
- Jorge Orama Monroig
  (1989–1992) Ponce
- René Muñoz Padín
  (1965–1968) San Juan
- Josefina Ojeda de Battle
  (1965-1968) At Large
- José Ortiz Dalliot
  (2001–2005) San Juan
- Margarita Ostolaza Bey
  (2001–2005) San Juan
- Mercedes Otero de Ramos
  (1993–2001) At Large
- Joaquín Peña Peña
  (1985–1993) Carolina
- Roberto Prats Palerm
  (2001–2005) At Large
- Bruno Ramos
  (1997-2005) Ponce
- Jorge Alberto Ramos Comas
  (1997–2000) Mayagüez
- Marco Antonio Rigau
  (1989–1997) At Large
- Gilberto Rivera Ortiz
  (1970–1993) Humacao
- Juan Rivera Ortiz
  (1973–1993, 1996–1997) Guayama
- Julio Rodríguez Gómez
  (2002–2005) Arecibo
- Maribel Rodríguez Hernández
  (2001–2002) Arecibo
- Rafael Rodríguez Vargas
  (2001–2005) Arecibo
- Carlos Román Benítez
  (1953–1964) San Juan
- Edgardo Rosario Burgos
  (1989–1993) Arecibo
- Jesús Santa Aponte
  (1977–1993) Humacao
- Cirilo Tirado Delgado
  (1989–1997) Guayama
- Roberto Vigoreaux Lorenzana
  (2001–2005) At Large
- Eugenio Fernández Cerra
  (1960–1964) At Large
- Jorge Alberto Ramos Vélez
  (2001-2004) Mayagüez

Puerto Rican Independence Party

- Rubén Berríos
  "At Large"
- Gilberto Concepción De Gracia
  "At Large"
- William Córdova Chirino
  (1953-1956) "At Large"
- Fernando Martín García
  (2001–2005) "At Large"
- Lorenzo Piñero Rivera
  (1957–1960) "At Large"
- Manuel Rodríguez Orellana
  (2000–2001) At Large
- María de Lourdes Santiago
  (2005–2008) "At Large"
