= 22nd Senate of Puerto Rico =

Upper house of the 14th Legislative Assembly of Puerto Rico

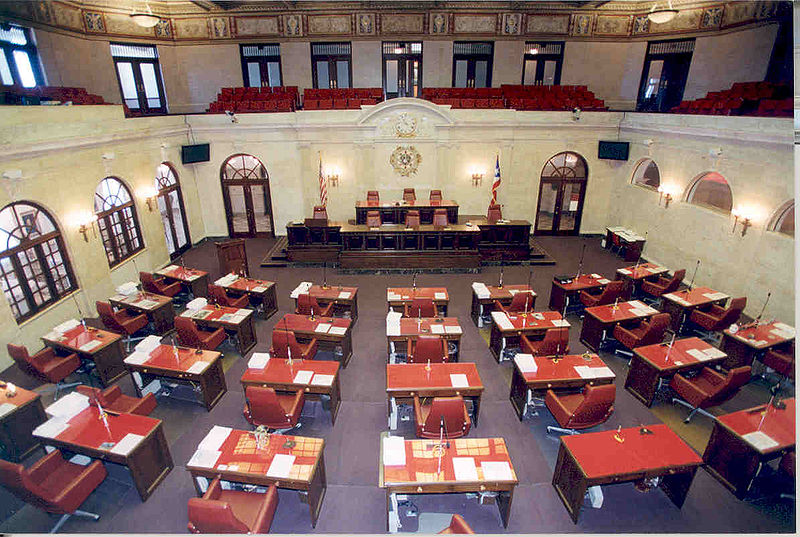

In session
- January 2, 2001 – January 1, 2005

Leadership
- President: Antonio Fas Alzamora
- President pro tem: Velda González
- Minority Leader: Kenneth McClintock (PNP); Fernando Martín (PIP)
- Minority Whip: Orlando Parga

Structure
- Seats: 28 voting members
- Parties represented: PPD; PNP; PIP

Legislature
- 14th Legislative Assembly of Puerto Rico

Lower house
- 26th House of Representatives of Puerto Rico

Sessions
- 1st: January 14, 2001 – January 12, 2002
- 2nd: January 13, 2002 – January 11, 2003
- 3rd: January 12, 2003 – January 10, 2004
- 4th: January 11, 2004 – January 1, 2005

The 22nd Senate of Puerto Rico was the upper house of the 14th Legislative Assembly of Puerto Rico that met from January 2, 2001, to January 1, 2005. All members were elected in the General Elections of 2000. The Senate had a majority of members from the Popular Democratic Party (PPD).

The body is counterparted by the 26th House of Representatives of Puerto Rico in the lower house.

== Leadership ==
Position	Name	Party	District
President of the Senate	Antonio Fas Alzamora	PPD	At-Large
President pro Tempore	Velda González de Modestti	PPD	At-Large
Majority Leader		PPD	
Majority Whip		PPD	
Minority Leader	Kenneth McClintock	PNP	At-large
Minority Whip	Orlando Parga	PNP	At-Large

== Members ==
=== Membership ===
District	Name	Party
I - San Juan	José Ortíz Dalliot	PPD
I - San Juan	Margarita Ostolaza	PPD
II - Bayamón	Migdalia Padilla Alvelo	PNP
II - Bayamón	Pablo Lafontaine	PNP
III - Arecibo	Maribel Rodríguez	PPD
III - Arecibo	Rafael Rodríguez Vargas	PPD
IV - Mayagüez-Aguadilla	Jorge Ramos Vélez	PPD
IV - Mayagüez-Aguadilla	Rafael Irizarry	PPD
V - Ponce	Modesto Agosto Alicea	PPD
V - Ponce	Bruno Ramos	PPD
VI - Guayama	Cirilo Tirado Rivera	PPD
VI - Guayama	Angel M. Rodríguez	PPD
VII - Humacao	José Luis Dalmau	PPD
VII - Humacao	Sixto Hernández Serrano	PPD
VIII - Carolina	Juan Cancel Alegría	PPD
VIII - Carolina	Yasmín Mejías	PPD
At-Conspicuous	Luz Arce Ferrer	PNP
At-Conspicuous	Eudaldo Báez Galib	PPD
At-Conspicuous	Norma Burgos	PNP
At-Conspicuous	Antonio Fas Alzamora	PPD
At-Conspicuous	Fernando Martín	PIP
At-Conspicuous	Kenneth McClintock	PNP
At-Conspicuous	Orlando Parga Figueroa	PNP
At-Conspicuous	Sergio Peña Clos	PNP
At-Conspicuous	Roberto Prats	PPD
At-Conspicuous	Miriam Ramírez de Ferrer	PNP
At-Conspicuous	Roberto Vigoreaux	PPD
