= Senator Vélez =

Senator Vélez may refer to:

- David Cruz Vélez, Senate of Puerto Rico
- Jorge Alberto Ramos Vélez (born 1970), Senate of Puerto Rico
