= Senator Soto =

Senator Soto may refer to:

- Danny López Soto (1944–2011), Senate of Puerto Rico
- Darren Soto (born 1978), Florida State Senate
- José Tous Soto (1874–1933), Senate of Puerto Rico
- Lornna Soto (born 1970), Senate of Puerto Rico
- Miguel Deynes Soto (born 1936), Senate of Puerto Rico
- Nell Soto (1926–2009), California State Senate
