= Héctor Martínez =

Héctor Martínez may refer to:

== Politics ==
- Héctor Martínez Colón, Puerto Rican politician
- Héctor Ruiz Martínez (1943–1986), Puerto Rican mayor and teacher
- Héctor Martínez Maldonado (born 1968), Puerto Rican senator

== Sports ==
- Héctor Martínez (baseball announcer), baseball announcer
- Héctor Martínez (outfielder) (1939–1999), Cuban baseball player
- Héctor Martínez (footballer, born 1947), Argentine football midfielder and manager
- Héctor Martínez (footballer, born 1995), Spanish footballer
- Héctor Martínez (footballer, born 1998), Argentine footballer
- Héctor Martínez (footballer, born 1999), Spanish footballer
- Héctor Martínez (referee), Uruguayan football referee

== Other ==
- Héctor Martínez Arteche (1934–2011), Mexican painter and muralist
- Héctor Martínez Muñoz (1924–1991), member of the Supreme Court of Puerto Rico

== See also ==
- Héctor Martín Cantero or Hector Martin, Spanish video game console hacker
