= Maribel Rodríguez =

Puerto Rican politician

Member of the Puerto Rico Senate from the Arecibo district
- In office January 2, 2001 – March 7, 2002
- Succeeded by: Julio Rodríguez Gómez

Personal details
- Born: San Juan, Puerto Rico
- Party: Popular Democratic Party (PPD)
- Profession: Politician

Maribel Rodríguez is a Puerto Rican politician from the Popular Democratic Party (PPD). Rodríguez served as member of the 22nd Senate of Puerto Rico from 2001 to 2005.

Rodríguez was elected to the Senate of Puerto Rico in the 2000 general election. She represented the District of Arecibo, along with Rafael Rodríguez Vargas. However, Rodríguez was forced to retire due to irregularities in her finances. Her then-husband, Juan Manuel Cruzado, mayor of Vega Alta, was also being investigated for corruption and money laundering. Rodríguez resignation was effective on March 7, 2002.

== See also ==
- 22nd Senate of Puerto Rico
