= Juan Cancel Alegría =

Puerto Rican politician

Member of the Puerto Rico Senate from the Carolina district
- In office January 2, 2001 – January 1, 2005

Personal details
- Party: Popular Democratic Party
- Profession: Politician, Senator

Juan Andrés Cancel Alegría is a Puerto Rican politician and former senator. He was a member of the Senate of Puerto Rico from 2001 to 2005.

== Biography ==
Juan Cancel Alegría is the son of former President of the Senate Juan Cancel Ríos and Carmen Alegría.

In 2000, Cancel was elected to the Senate of Puerto Rico for the District of Carolina. In 2003, he presented his candidacy for reelection, and won his party primaries. However, at the 2004 general elections, he lost to the candidates of the PNP, Lornna Soto and Héctor Martínez Maldonado. During his time at the Senate, he presided the Commission of Infrastructure and Development.

After that, Cancel was appointed as Administrator of the Government Retirement System. He remained in his position until his resignation in 2008, which came because of his attempt at political office. However, he was defeated at the PPD primaries. After the defeat, Cancel Alegría went to work in Atlanta, Georgia.

In 2011, representative Lourdes Ramos revealed irregularities in the finances of the Retirement System during the administration of Cancel Alegría. After an investigation, Ramos presented her findings to the Puerto Rico Department of Justice.
