= Senator Vargas =

Senator Vargas may refer to:

- Juan Vargas (born 1961), California State Senate
- Lammis Vargas, Rhode Island State Senate
- Rafael Rodríguez Vargas, Senate of Puerto Rico
- Tony Vargas (born 1984), Nebraska State Senate
