= Senator Maldonado =

Senator Maldonado may refer to:

- Abel Maldonado (born 1967), California State Senate
- Héctor Martínez Maldonado (born 1968), Senate of Puerto Rico
