= Senator Serrano =

Senator Serrano may refer to:

- José M. Serrano (born 1972), New York State Senate
- Sixto Hernández Serrano, Senate of Puerto Rico
