= Senator Colón =

Senator Colón may refer to:

- Héctor Martínez Colón, Senate of Puerto Rico
- Rafael Hernández Colón (1936–2019), Senate of Puerto Rico
