= Rafael Irizarry =

Rafael Irizarry may refer to:

- Rafael Irizarry (politician), Puerto Rican politician who served as a member of the Senate of Puerto Rico from 2001 to 2005
- Rafael Irizarry (scientist), professor of biostatistics and one of the founders of the Bioconductor project
