= Senator Valentine =

Senator Valentine may refer to:

- John K. Valentine (1904–1950), Iowa State Senate
- John L. Valentine (fl. 1980s–2010s), Utah State Senate

== See also ==
- Freddy Valentín (fl. 1990s–2000s), Senate of Puerto Rico
- Linda Valentino (born 1956), Maine State Senate
