= David Cruz =

David Cruz may refer to:

- David Antonio Cruz, American artist
- David Cruz Vélez, Puerto Rican politician
- David Cruz (journalist), American broadcast journalist and radio host
