= Pablo Lafontaine =

Puerto Rican politician

Member of the Puerto Rico Senate from the Bayamón district
- In office January 2, 2001 – January 1, 2005

Personal details
- Born: 1938 (age 87–88) Utuado, Puerto Rico
- Party: New Progressive Party (PNP)
- Profession: Politician

Pablo Lafontaine Rodríguez is a Puerto Rican politician from the New Progressive Party (PNP). Lafontaine served as member of the 22nd Senate of Puerto Rico from 2001 to 2005.

Lafontaine was elected to the Senate of Puerto Rico in the 2000 general election. Lafontaine represented the District of Bayamón, along with Migdalia Padilla. Lafontaine tried to run again for the 2004 general elections, but was defeated by Carmelo Ríos Santiago in the PNP primaries the year before.

After that, Lafontaine has worked as a Legislative Advisor for the Senate.

== See also ==
- 22nd Senate of Puerto Rico
