= Senator Delgado =

Senator Delgado may refer to:

- Cirilo Tirado Delgado (fl. 1970s–1990s), Senate of Puerto Rico
- Francisco Afan Delgado (1886–1964), Senate of the Philippines
- Vanessa Delgado (born 1977), California State Senate
