= Larry Rodriguez =

Larry Rodriguez may refer to:

- Larry Rodriguez (basketball) (born 1983), Filipino basketball player
- Larry Seilhamer Rodríguez (born 1954), Puerto Rican politician
- Larry Rodriguez, cameraman who made an official complaint of assault against baseball player Kenny Rogers
