= Phi Epsilon Chi =

Puerto Rican fraternity

- ΦΕΧ
- Founded: September 26, 1943; 83 years ago for active groups, University of Puerto Rico at Mayagüez
- Type: Social
- Affiliation: Independent
- Status: Active
- Scope: National (PR)
- Motto: Yo soy Phi Epsilon de corazón
- Colors: Blue and White
- Chapters: 8 (active)
- Headquarters: P.O. Box 1703; Manati, Puerto Rico 00674; United States
- Website: www.phiepsilonchi.com

Phi Epsilon Chi Fraternity (ΦΕΧ) (in Spanish) Fi Epsilon Cai is commonly known as La Phi Epsilon, is a Puerto Rican fraternity established at originally University of Puerto Rico at Mayagüez on September 26, 1943 by two women and seven male students of University of Puerto Rico at Mayagüez.

== History ==
Phi Epsilon Chi was founded on September 26, 1943 by 15 male students at University of Puerto Rico at Mayagüez. The founding members are Bishop Dra. Myriam Visot and Celia Pérez Folch. The seven students were Carlos A. Flores Pagán, Pármenas E. Amaro Figueroa, Julio Hernández Fragoso, Alvaro Morales, José A. Pagán, Erving Flores Rodriguez and Ralph Dick Rovira.

== Symbols ==
The fraternity's motto is Yo soy Phi Epsilon de corazón. Its colors are blue and white.

== Organization ==
The fraternity is composed of student chapters called Capitulos, Zones (Zonas) and Great Policy (Spanish: Gran Directiva).

== Chapters ==
Following is a list of the collegiate chapters of Phi Epsilon Chi. Active chapters are indicated in bold. Inactive chapters are in italics.

Chapter	Location	Status	References
Alpha	Mayaguez, Puerto Rico	Active	
Beta	San Juan, Puerto Rico	Active	
Gamma	Ponce, Puerto Rico	Active	
Delta	San German, Puerto Rico	Active	
Epsilon	Arecibo, Puerto Rico	Active	
Zeta	Humacao, Puerto Rico	Active	
Lambda	Utuado, Puerto Rico	Active	
Omega	Arecibo, Puerto Rico	Active	

== Notable members ==
Name	Notability
Calixto Calero Juarbe	Founder member of New Progressive Party of Puerto Rico; former Senator in the Senate of Puerto Rico
Jorge Suarez	Member of the Senate of Puerto Rico

== See also ==
- List of fraternities and sororities in Puerto Rico
