= Cirilo Tirado Rivera =

Puerto Rican politician

Member of the Puerto Rico Senate from the at-large district
- In office 2008–2021

Member of the Puerto Rico Senate from the Guayama district
- In office 2000–2008

Personal details
- Born: June 14, 1964 (age 62) Patillas, Puerto Rico
- Party: Popular Democratic Party
- Education: Polytechnic University of Puerto Rico (BSE)
- Profession: Politician

Cirilo Tirado Rivera (born June 14, 1964, in Patillas, Puerto Rico) is a Puerto Rican politician and former senator. He was a member of the Senate of Puerto Rico from 2000 to 2021.

== Early years and studies ==
Cirilo Tirado was born on June 14, 1964, in Patillas, Puerto Rico, to Quintina Rivera Montañez, a teacher, and Cirilo Tirado Delgado, an attorney, and former senator and representative.

He finished his studies in his hometown of Patillas. He holds a Bachelor's Degree in Environmental Engineering Sciences from the Polytechnic University of Puerto Rico.

== Political career ==
=== First years in the PPD ===
Cirilo Tirado was part of the Board of the Popular Democratic Party. In 1989, he was president of the Puerto Rican Autonomist Youth and then, administrator of the Industrial Commission of Puerto Rico.

=== District Senator: 2000–2008 ===
At the 2000 general elections, Tirado was elected senator for the Guayama district. During that term, he presided over the Commissions of Agriculture, Natural Resources, and Energy; Commission of Government Integrity; and Joint Commission of the Comptroller's Special Reports.

In 2004, he was reelected for a second term as senator for Guayama.

=== At-large Senator: 2008–present ===
Tirado decided to run for senator at large in 2008. He was chosen during the primaries of his party, and at the 2008 general elections, he was elected. During that term, he has been the speaker for his party on the Commissions of Treasury, Agriculture, Natural and Environmental Resources, Social Welfare, Western Region Development, and the Joint Commission of the Comptroller's Special Reports.
