= Roberto Sánchez Vilella School of Public Administration =

Public policy school of the University of Puerto Rico, Río Piedras Campus

- Type: Public
- Established: 1941
- Dean: Palmira Rios
- Location: Rio Piedras, Puerto Rico
- Campus: Urban
- Nickname: EGAP
- Website: www.egap.uprrp.edu

The Roberto Sánchez Vilella School of Public Administration is one of the professional graduate schools of the University of Puerto Rico, Río Piedras Campus and the only public policy school in Puerto Rico, an unincorporated territory of the United States.

In 1997, the university administration gave the school the name of the late Roberto Sanchez Vilella, a former Governor of Puerto Rico and one of the school's prominent lecturers.

Its graduates include important and prominent figures of Puerto Rico, including Norma Burgos, a former Secretary of State of Puerto Rico and currently a member of the Senate of Puerto Rico.

The school received official accreditation from the National Association of Schools of Public Affairs and Administration in 2010 and, as such, is the only accredited Spanish-speaking public policy school in the United States.

== Faculty ==
The school's professors include Dr. Richard Blanco Peck, Dra. Yolanda Cordero Nieves, Dr. Juan Moldes Rodríguez, Dr. Mario Negrón Portillo, Dr. Saúl Pratts de León, Dr. José A. Punsoda Díaz, Dra. Palmira N. Ríos González, Dr. Leonardo Santana Rabell, Dr. Carlos Alá Santiago, and Dr. César Rey, a former Secretary of the Puerto Rico Department of Education under Governor Sila Calderón (2001-2004).

== See also ==
- University of Puerto Rico
- University of Puerto Rico, Rio Piedras Campus
- Rio Piedras
