= 2008 Popular Democratic Party of Puerto Rico primaries =

Popular Democratic Party primaries, 2008
- March 9, 2008

The 2008 Popular Democratic Party primaries were the primary elections by which voters of the Popular Democratic Party (PPD) chose its nominees for various political offices of Puerto Rico for the 2008 general elections. They were held on March 9, 2008. Incumbent Governor Aníbal Acevedo Vilá faced no opposition for his candidacy, making him the official candidate for the elections.

== Background ==
At the time of the primaries, incumbent Governor Aníbal Acevedo Vilá was allegedly being investigated by federal authorities for allegations of irregularities in his campaign finances. However, despite this, the party supported his candidacy for Governor.

Also, one of the most contested campaigns was the one for Mayor of Ponce, with incumbent Francisco Zayas Seijo facing the former administrator of the city, Carlos Jirau.

== Candidates ==
=== Senate ===
==== At-large ====
- Eduardo Bhatia
- Juan Cancel Alegría
- Víctor de la Cruz
- Landy Fabre
- Antonio Fas Alzamora
- Alejandro García Padilla
- Sila Mari González Calderón
- Juan Eugenio Hernández Mayoral
- Rafael Irizarri
- Margarita Ostolaza
- Cirilo Tirado Rivera
- Roberto Vigoreaux

==== District ====
The Popular Democratic Party held primaries on only 4 of the 8 senatorial districts.

===== Arecibo =====
- Wanda Arroyo
- Javier Cruz
- María Elena
- Edgar A. Martínez
- Francis Rivera
- Iván Serrano Cordero

===== Mayagüez-Aguadilla =====
- Robin H. Montes
- Sergio Ortíz
- Omar Soto
- Enid Toro de Báez

===== Ponce =====
- Modesto Agosto Alicea
- José Luis Galarza
- Bruno Ramos
- José H. Rivera
- Rafael Santiago

===== Guayama =====
- Luis Guillermo Febus
- Eder Ortíz Ortíz
- Angel M. Rodríguez

=== House of Representatives ===
==== At-large ====
- Jorge Colberg Toro
- Ulises Dalmau
- Héctor Ferrer
- Brenda López de Arrarás
- Jeanette Miranda
- Julio Muñoz
- Angel Ortíz
- Jaime Perelló
- Coco Ríos
- Frankie Rodríguez
- Ramón Ruíz Nieves
- José Segui
- Luis Vega Ramos
- Carmen Yulín Cruz

==== District ====
The Popular Democratic Party held primaries on 24 of the 40 representative districts.

===== District 3 =====
- Ruthy Currás
- Herminio Pagán

===== District 11 =====
- Ricky Arrillaga
- Rafael Hernández

===== District 12 =====
- Jorge Avilés
- Eliezer Burgos
- Claudio Ferrer, Jr.
- Remberto Rodríguez

===== District 13 =====
- Benny Collazo
- Felix Pagán
- Víctor Rodríguez
- Amadis Ulises

===== District 14 =====
- Vángelo Figueroa
- Felix Rosario
- Juan R. Torres

===== District 16 =====
- Tony Rodríguez
- Juan Vega Salamanca

===== District 17 =====
- Moisés Acevedo
- Armando Franco
- Alfredo González
- Héctor Mol Ibañez

===== District 18 =====
- Luis "Chivita" González
- Concepción Salas
- Solá
- María Vargas

===== District 20 =====
- Elvin Camacho
- Luis Ramírez
- Jorgito Ramos
- Eduardo Rosado

===== District 21 =====
- Naida Mateo
- Lydia Méndez Silva
- Rafy Nazario

===== District 22 =====
- Juan O. Alicea
- Georgie González

===== District 23 =====
- Wilo Beltrán
- Rafael A. García

===== District 24 =====
- Ramón Borrero
- Luis Farinacci
- Vilma Flores
- Ferdinand Martínez
- Vangie Rivera

===== District 25 =====
- Edgar Manolo Avilés
- Jorge Miranda
- Piro Reyes
- Víctor Vassallo

===== District 26 =====
- John Avilés
- Juan Carlos Figueroa
- Gamalier Pagán

===== District 27 =====
- Carmen Iris González
- Carlos Luis Torres
- Pito Torres

===== District 28 =====
- Jorge I. Agosto
- Frankie Cuadrado
- Remesal
- Rosendo
- Luis Santiago

===== District 29 =====
- Félix Agosto
- Heric Colón
- José R. Varela

===== District 30 =====
- Rey Alomar
- Eduardo Cintrón
- Migdalia Díaz
- Domingo Torres

===== District 33 =====
- Héctor Carrasquillo
- Gilbert

===== District 34 =====
- George Soto
- Juan Pedro

===== District 35 =====
- Narden Jaime Espinosa
- Ricardo Fernández
- Freddy
- José Pi Báez
- José "Tony" Reyes
- Valentín Valdés
- William Vázquez

===== District 36 =====
- Ricky Abreu
- Andújar

===== District 37 =====
- José Miguel del Valle, Jr.
- Frankie Guerra

=== Mayors ===
The Popular Democratic Party held primaries on 23 of 78 municipalities.

==== Arecibo ====
- Ramón E. Dasta
- Héctor Rafael

==== Arroyo ====
- Eric Bachier Román
- Ricardo Rivera

==== Canóvanas ====
- Moisés Castro
- Jesús Rosado

==== Cataño ====
- Félix Fuentes
- José Rosario

==== Ceiba ====
- Gilberto "Lex" Camacho
- Humberto González
- Abimael Portalatín

==== Culebra ====
- Alexis Bermúdez
- Digna Feliciana

==== Fajardo ====
- Myrna García
- Norma Guzmán

==== Florida ====
- Johnny de León
- Yonatan

==== Humacao ====
- Joel Rosario
- Marcelo Trujillo

==== Juana Díaz ====
- Luis Angel Cortés
- Ramón Hernández Torres

==== Lajas ====
- César Corales
- Marcos "Turin" Irizarry
- Ambrosio Rodríguez

==== Lares ====
- Chely
- Rigo Guilloty

==== Las Marías ====
- Reinaldo González
- José Javier Rodríguez

==== Las Piedras ====
- Nelson Vázquez
- Roberto Velázquez

==== Loíza ====
- Julito Osorio
- Maricruz Rivera

==== Moca ====
- Wilson Acevedo
- Aida E. González

==== Naranjito ====
- Manuel Martínez
- Moncho Padilla
- Víctor Manuel Pérez
- Cheo Rivera
- Jolly Rivera

==== Ponce ====
- Carlos Jirau
- Francisco Zayas Seijo

==== Rincón ====
- Juan D. Elías
- Carlos López Bonilla

==== Salinas ====
- Tony Badé
- Francisco Colón
- Abraham López
- Pedro Santos

==== Trujillo Alto ====
- José Luis Cruz Cruz
- Hiram

==== Utuado ====
- Jesús Arce
- Ramón Collazo
- Martín Negrón
- Otilio Plaza
- Quitín

==== Vieques ====
- Víctor Emeric
- Dámaso Serrano

== Results ==
=== Senate ===
==== At-large ====
Candidate	Popular vote	Percentage
Alejandro García Padilla	213,153	14.40%
Eduardo Bhatia	207,883	14.04
Juan Eugenio Hernández Mayoral	167,088	11.28
Sila Mari González Calderón	151,550	10.24
Antonio Fas Alzamora	133,161	8.99
Cirilo Tirado Rivera	124,593	8.41
Roberto Vigoreaux	117,731	7.95
Margarita Ostolaza	113,663	7.68
Juan Cancel Alegría	104,373	7.05
Landy Fabre	84,410	5.70
Rafael Irizarri	35,284	2.38
Víctor de la Cruz	27,408	1.85
Others	350	0.02

==== District ====
===== Arecibo =====
Candidate	Popular vote	Percentage
María Elena Pérez	12,612	21.62%
Edgar A. Martínez	11,979	20.54
Iván Serrano	11,415	19.57
Wanda Arroyo	9,771	16.75
Javier Cruz	9,637	16.52
Francis Rivera	2,875	4.93
Others	41	0.07

===== Mayagüez-Aguadilla =====
Candidate	Popular vote	Percentage
Sergio Ortíz	21,699	33.43%
Enid Toro de Báez	20,434	31.48
Robin H. Montes	11,379	17.53
Omar Soto	11,370	17.51
Others	36	0.06

===== Ponce =====
Candidate	Popular vote	Percentage
José Luis Galarza	19,582	23.95%
Rafael Santiago	17,968	21.98
Modesto Agosto Alicea	15,676	19.17
Bruno Ramos	15,621	19.10
José H. Rivera	12,848	15.71
Others	70	0.09

===== Guayama =====
Candidate	Popular vote	Percentage
Angel M. Rodríguez	29,611	37.64%
Eder Ortíz Ortíz	28,736	36.53
Luis Guillermo Febus	20,284	25.79
Others	33	0.04

=== House of Representatives ===
==== At-large ====
Candidate	Popular vote	Percentage
Héctor Ferrer	228,098	15.81%
Jaime Perelló	147,868	10.25
Brenda López de Arrarás	144,099	9.99
Jorge Colberg Toro	140,158	9.72
Carmen Yulín Cruz	133,510	9.26
Luis Vega Ramos	132,967	9.22
Ulises Dalmau	101,060	7.01
Ramón Ruíz Nieves	87,298	6.05
Angel Ortíz	75,671	5.25
Julio Muñoz	68,955	4.78
Jeanette Miranda	59,316	4.11
José Segui	50,458	3.50
Frankie Rodríguez	39,007	2.70
Coco Ríos	33,622	2.33
Others	392	0.03

== Aftermath ==
=== Acevedo Vilá's candidacy ===
Several weeks after the primaries, Incumbent Governor and PPD candidate, Aníbal Acevedo Vilá, was officially indicted on 19 counts of campaign finance violations. This put his candidacy in jeopardy, and several candidates where taunted as possible replacements. However, Acevedo Vilá decided to run for reelection, and was openly endorsed by the Party in a massive caucus held at the José Miguel Agrelot Coliseum in April 2008. Acevedo Vilá would lose the 2008 general elections. However, in March 2009, he was found not guilty of all charges by a jury.

=== Split in Ponce ===
In the primary for the Mayor of Ponce, incumbent Francisco Zayas Seijo narrowly beat his opponent, former Ponce administrator, Carlos Jirau. Zayas beat Jirau by less than 30 votes. After the defeat, Jirau appealed the primary claiming there were irregularities in the process. He also started an independent movement called Movimiento Autónomo Ponceño. At the 2008 general elections, both Zayas and Jirau were defeated by the PNP candidate Mayita Meléndez. This was the first time a PNP candidate had won in Ponce in more than 20 years.

== See also ==
- New Progressive Party primaries, 2008
