= José Ortiz Daliot =

Puerto Rican attorney and politician (born 1945)

Member of the Puerto Rico Senate from the San Juan district
- In office 2001–2005

Personal details
- Born: November 9, 1945 (age 80) Ponce, Puerto Rico
- Party: Popular Democratic Party (PPD)
- Education: University of Puerto Rico (BBA); University of Puerto Rico School of Law (JD)
- Occupation: Politician, Senator, Attorney

Military service
- Allegiance: United States of America
- Branch/service: United States Army
- Rank: Captain
- Unit: 25th Infantry Division
- Battles/wars: Vietnam War

José Alfredo Ortiz Daliot is a Puerto Rican attorney and politician. He is a former director of the Puerto Rico Federal Affairs Administration (PRFAA) and a former member of the Senate of Puerto Rico.

Earned a Bachelor of Business Administration from the University of Puerto Rico and a Juris Doctor from the University of Puerto Rico School of Law.

He served in the United States Army as an Intelligence officer. He was a member of the 25th Infantry Division. He is a Vietnam War veteran and was discharged with the rank of Captain.

Ortiz Daliot served as counsel for the city and municipality of Mayagüez, which requested inclusion in the receipt of public works capital when the city closed six sugarmills in the 1970s.

Ortiz Daliot served at the Puerto Rico Federal Affairs Administration (PRFAA) during Governor Rafael Hernández Colón's administration.

In 2000 he was elected, along with professor Margarita Ostolaza as Senator from the District of San Juan. During his only term in office, Ortiz Daliot authored many laws, including the one that created San Juan's Ecological Corridor. In 2004, they were defeated in their attempt for reelection by the candidates of the PNP, Roberto Arango and Carlos Díaz.

After the defeat, Ortiz Daliot returned to his private practice. In recent years, he has returned to the public spotlight for being involved with ALAS (Alliance for Free Sovereign Association), an organization dedicated to promoting the development and evolution of the current political status, the Estado Libre Asociado. The organization criticized the position of the Popular Democratic Party, Ortiz' former party, for the 2012 status referendum.
