= Carlos Pesquera =

Puerto Rican politician

Chair of the Puerto Rico New Progressive Party
- In office April 5, 2001 – October 14, 2003
- Preceded by: Leo Díaz Urbina
- Succeeded by: Pedro Rosselló
- In office September 10, 1999 – February 17, 2000
- Preceded by: Pedro Rosselló
- Succeeded by: Norma Burgos

Secretary of Transportation and Public Works of Puerto Rico
- In office 1993–1999
- Governor: Pedro Rosselló

Personal details
- Born: Carlos Ignacio Pesquera Morales; August 17, 1956 (age 69) San Juan, Puerto Rico
- Party: New Progressive
- Other political affiliations: Democratic
- Education: University of Puerto Rico at Mayagüez (BS); Cornell University (MS, PhD)

Carlos Ignacio Pesquera-Morales (born August 17, 1956) is a Puerto Rican civil engineer who served as the Secretary of Transportation and Public Works of Puerto Rico from 1993 to 1999. He ran in the 2016 New Progressive Party primary to be Puerto Rico's Resident Commissioner as Pedro Pierluisi's ballot running mate, but lost by over 70% of the vote to state representative Jenniffer Gonzalez. He is married to Irasema Rivera, an agronomist, and has one son and one daughter. He currently resides in Guaynabo, Puerto Rico.

== Education ==
Carlos Ignacio Pesquera Morales graduated from High School while attending Nuestra Señora de Belén. Dr. Pesquera attended the University of Puerto Rico at Mayagüez, where he graduated with high honors as an engineer. He was awarded the Etienne Totti Award for Best Student of the Civil Engineering Class, 1978. Later, Pesquera continued his graduate studies at Cornell University, where he obtained an M.S. and Ph.D. in Structural Engineering. At Cornell, Pesquera specialized in the application of Computer-Aided-Design tools in the design of steel framed structures. He then worked at 3D/Eye where he was in charge of developing Steel-3D, one of the first fully integrated structural design tools based on computer graphics. Afterwards, he taught civil engineering at the University of Puerto Rico at Mayagüez.

== Political career ==
Pesquera was the Secretary of the Department of Transportation and Public Works of Puerto Rico under Pedro Rosselló's first and second terms as Governor (1993–1999). As Secretary of Transportation, he is credited as the driving force behind the $2 billion Tren Urbano (Urban Train), the Superaqueduct that has resolved metropolitan San Juan's water rationing problems, numerous road construction projects and the construction of the José Miguel Agrelot Coliseum in San Juan. He ran for Governor of Puerto Rico as a candidate of the pro-statehood New Progressive Party of Puerto Rico in the 2000 elections but was defeated by Sila María Calderón of the Popular Democratic Party. The results of that election showed: Sila Calderón (PDP) with 978,860 votes (48.6%); Carlos Pesquera (NPP) 919,194 votes (45.7%); Ruben Berrios (PIP) 104,705 (5.2%), while other candidates had about 2700 votes (under 0.5%). Afterwards, he reorganized his followers and remained the head of the NPP until the year 2003. That same year Pedro Rosselló returned from retirement and Pesquera ran for his party's candidacy for Governor but was soundly defeated in a primary election by Rosselló.

Pesquera then retired from public life and is currently teaching at several Puerto Rican universities. In January 2007, Governor Aníbal Acevedo Vilá nominated him to be part of the Board of Regents of the University of Puerto Rico.

Party political offices
Preceded by Pedro Rosselló	Chair of the Puerto Rico New Progressive Party; 1999–2000	Succeeded by Norma Burgos
Preceded by Pedro Rosselló	New Progressive nominee for Governor of Puerto Rico; 2000	Succeeded by Pedro Rosselló
Preceded by Leo Díaz Urbina	Chair of the Puerto Rico New Progressive Party; 2001–2003	Succeeded by Pedro Rosselló
