= Roberto Arango =

American politician

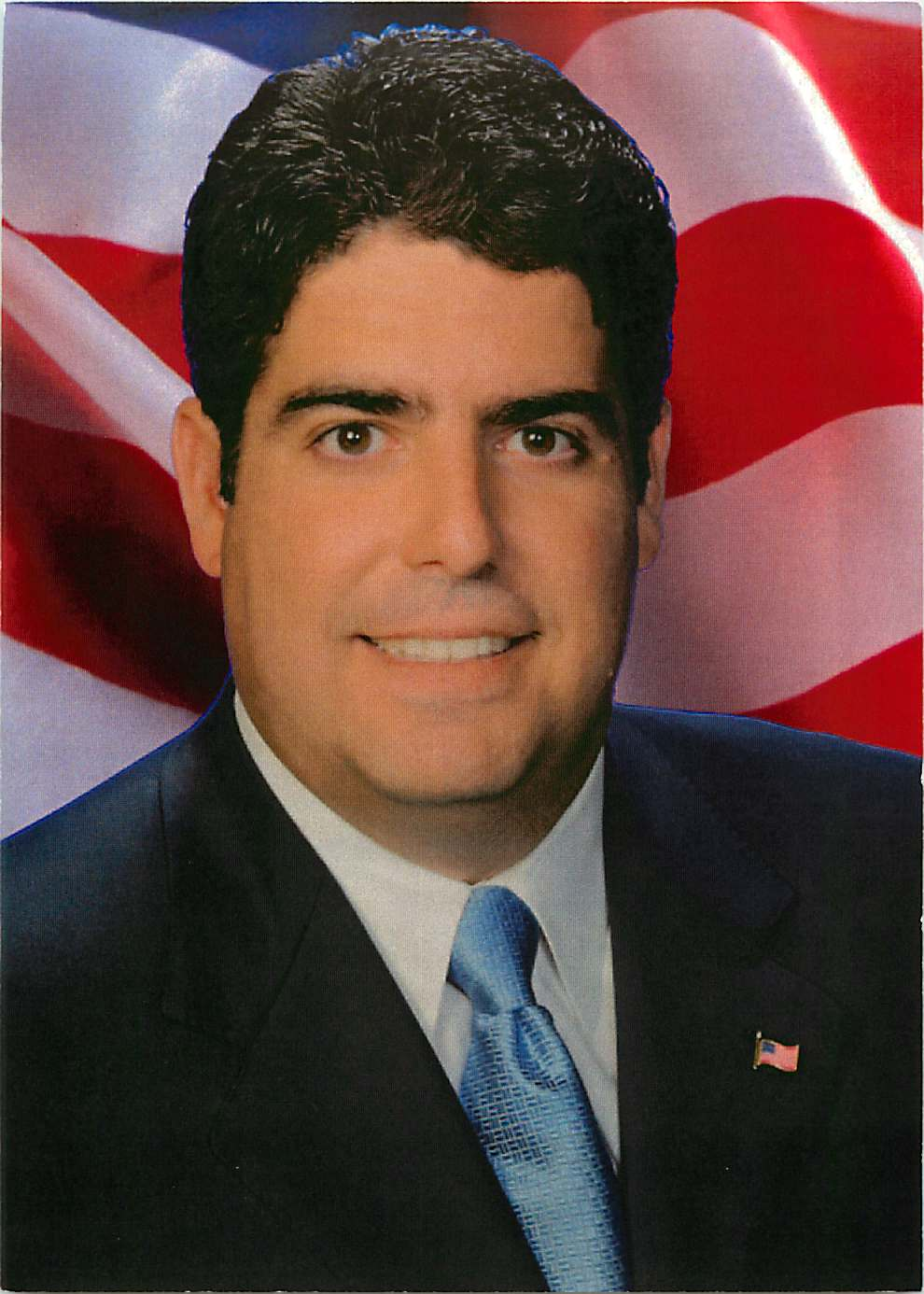
- Arango in 2014

Majority Leader of the Puerto Rico Senate
- In office January 2009 – August 28, 2011
- Preceded by: Margarita Nolasco
- Succeeded by: Larry Seilhamer

Member of the Puerto Rico Senate from the 1st district
- In office January 2005 – August 28, 2011

Personal details
- Born: Roberto Arango-Vinent; September 28 Miami, Florida, U.S.
- Party: New Progressive
- Other political affiliations: Republican
- Spouse: Ana Barba
- Children: 1
- Education: Louisiana State University (BA)

Roberto Arango-Vinent is an American politician who served in the Senate of Puerto Rico from January 2005 until August 2011 representing the San Juan district for the New Progressive Party of Puerto Rico (NPP), which is a conservative group derived from the Republican Statehood Party.

During his tenure, Arango voted for anti-gay legislation several times. He resigned his senate seat and withdrew from politics in 2011 after a series of nude photos from the gay match application Grindr were made public, and stated that he had come to realise that he was gay. In 2014, he ran, unsuccessfully, for election again.

== Early years and career ==
Arango was born in the city of Miami in the United States. Both of his parents were Cuban.

Arango studied at Colegio San Ignacio in San Juan. He then graduated from Louisiana State University (LSU) receiving a Bachelor's degree in Marketing and Technology. After that, he worked as a food importer and wholesaler.

After graduating, Arango worked for Procter & Gamble in several managerial positions.

In 1989 Arango founded his own food distribution company, Intercontinental Food Distributors. In 2003 he was named Young Entrepreneur of the year by the Business Men and Women International Alliance (AIHME).

== Career in politics ==
Arango decided to run for Senator for the San Juan District on the 2004 general elections. He claimed that he came from the private sector and was not a career politician. During the PNP primaries, he was the top vote-winner for San Juan district senator. In the general election on November 4, 2004, he was also the top vote-winner. He and running mate Carlos Díaz Sánchez defeated incumbent Popular Democratic Party senators Margarita Ostolaza and José Ortiz Dalliot. Upon taking office, Senate President Kenneth McClintock appointed him chairman of the Senate Commerce, Tourism and Infrastructure Committee, a post he held until May 2005. That year, Senator and former Governor Pedro Rosselló made an unsuccessful attempt to wrest the Presidency of the Senate away from McClintock; after Arango supported Rosselló, McClintock removed him from his Committee leadership position.

Arango then served as a member of the executive committee of the Council of State Governments' Eastern Regional Conference (CSG/ERC). An alumnus of CSG/ERC's Eastern Leadership Academy, he was elected president of the class of 2006. He was a member of CSG's Toll Fellows Program class of 2007.

Active in the Republican Party, he was the San Juan congressional district GOP committee chair and vice-chaired the George W. Bush/Dick Cheney Puerto Rico campaign in 2004. Within the NPP he was chair of its statehood ideological institute until he was removed for supporting Resident Commissioner Luis Fortuño's gubernatorial bid against NPP President Pedro Rosselló.

He was nominated for a second term in the 2008 PNP primary, which he won. In the 2008 general elections, he was the top vote-winner within the San Juan District. His fellow senators chose him as the Senate Majority Leader for the term, the top Senate leadership position after the Senate Presidency, for which Sen. Thomas Rivera Schatz was selected. As Majority Leader, he was charged with the task of pursuing the approval of the PNP's programmatic legislation in the legislative body.

He was opposed to the practice of shooting firearms up into the air during the holiday season, especially on New Year's Eve, a practice that has caused injury. On December 21, 2008, he held a joint press conference on the issue with Guayama, Puerto Rico Mayor-elect Glorimari Jaime and several pop artists, including Miguelito.

== Sex scandal and after ==
In August 2011, several nude pictures of a man, allegedly Arango, started circulating the press. The images were allegedly posted on Grindr, a gay mobile dating site. Arango distanced himself from the images and publicly stated that his political adversaries were responsible for igniting the scandal. Initially the leaked pictures were tame, but subsequent pictures were more explicit and pornographic in nature. Arango resigned his senate position on August 28, 2011, due to the media pressure and the impact to his family.

After his resignation, Arango started working on a private international distributor. When questioned by the press he did not deny that he might return to politics in the future.

In March 2014 Arango said in an interview with NotiUno that he had come to understand he was gay as a result of his resignation. Critics noted he had previously cast several anti-gay votes, had led efforts to pass a constitutional same-sex marriage ban, and in 2004 mocked another candidate, implying that the candidate was gay.

In March 2014 Arango announced his intention to return to politics by running for the presidency of the New Progressive Party (PNP) in San Juan. However, he was defeated by Leo Díaz Urbina in the elections that were held on June 8, 2014. Arango finished with 1,186 votes, for 12.25%.

Senate of Puerto Rico
Preceded by Margarita Nolasco	Majority Leader of the Puerto Rico Senate; 2009–2011	Succeeded by Larry Seilhamer
