= List of presidents of the New Progressive Party (Puerto Rico) =

The New Progressive Party of Puerto Rico was founded in 1967. Since then, the party has been led by 12 different presidents in 16 terms of leadership. Every president of the political party has held a position in the Puerto Rican government. The first party president was Luis A. Ferré, who served from 1967 to 1974. The presidents who served twice are: Carlos Romero Barceló, who served from 1974 to 1987 and again from 1989 to 1991, Pedro Rosselló, who served from 1991 to 1999 and again from 2003 to 2008 and Carlos Pesquera who served from 1999 to 2000 and again from 2001 to 2003, and the current president of the New Progressive Party is Pedro Pierluisi and Governor of Puerto Rico, who served from January 2013 to June 2016, and from August 2020 to present.

== List of presidents ==
#	Portrait	Name	Term start	Term end	Previous public posts
1	Luis A. Ferré	Luis A. Ferré	August 20, 1967	October 7, 1974	President of the Puerto Rico Senate; Governor
2	Carlos Romero Barceló	Carlos Romero Barceló	October 7, 1974	June 20, 1987	Mayor of San Juan; Governor; Resident Commissioner
3	Baltasar Corrada del Río	Baltasar Corrada del Río	June 20, 1987	January 11, 1988	Resident Commissioner of Puerto Rico; Mayor of San Juan; Secretary of State; Associate Justice of the Puerto Rico Supreme Court
4		Ramón Luis Rivera	January 11, 1988	January 2, 1989	Member of the Puerto Rico House of Representatives; Mayor of Bayamón
5	Carlos Romero Barceló	Carlos Romero Barceló	January 2, 1989	March 23, 1991	Mayor of San Juan; Governor; Resident Commissioner
6	Pedro Rosselló	Pedro Rosselló	March 23, 1991	September 10, 1999	Governor; Puerto Rico Senate
7		Carlos Pesquera	September 10, 1999	February 17, 2000	Secretary of Transportation
8		Norma Burgos	February 17, 2000	January 2, 2001	Secretary of State; Member of the Puerto Rico Senate
9		Leonides Díaz Urbina	January 2, 2001	April 5, 2001	Member of the Puerto Rico House of Representatives
10		Carlos Pesquera	April 5, 2001	October 14, 2003	Secretary of Transportation
11	Pedro Rosselló	Pedro Rosselló	October 14, 2003	December 21, 2008	Governor; Puerto Rico Senate
12	Luis Fortuño	Luis Fortuño	December 21, 2008	January 2, 2013	Resident Commissioner; Governor
13	Pedro Pierluisi	Pedro Pierluisi	January 2, 2013	June 23, 2016	Secretary of Justice; Resident Commissioner
14	Ricardo_Rosselló	Ricardo Rosselló	June 23, 2016	July 22, 2019	Governor of Puerto Rico
15		Thomas Rivera Schatz	July 22, 2019	August 25, 2020	President Of The Puerto Rican Senate
16	Pedro Pierluisi	Pedro Pierluisi	August 25, 2020	June 11, 2024	Secretary of Justice; Resident Commissioner; Governor
17	Pedro Pierluisi	Jenniffer González-Colón	June 11, 2024	Present	Speaker of the House of Representatives of Puerto Rico; Resident Commissioner; Governor
