= Rafael Irizarry (politician) =

Puerto Rican politician

Member of the Puerto Rico Senate from the Mayagüez district
- In office January 2, 2001 – January 1, 2005

Personal details
- Born: May 9, 1945 Mayagüez, Puerto Rico
- Died: March 9, 2022 (aged 76) Mayagüez, Puerto Rico
- Party: Popular Democratic Party (PPD)
- Profession: Lawyer, Politician

Military service
- Allegiance: United States of America
- Branch/service: United States Army
- Rank: Lieutenant colonel

Rafael Luis Irizarry Cruz is a Puerto Rican politician from the Popular Democratic Party (PPD). Irizarry served as member of the 22nd Senate of Puerto Rico from 2001 to 2005.

Irizarry was elected to the Senate of Puerto Rico in the 2000 general election. He represented the District of Mayagüez, along with Jorge Ramos Vélez.

He died on March 9, 2022, at San Antonio Hospital in Mayagüez, Puerto Rico at the age of 77. He was buried at Atlantic Gardens Veterans Cemetery in Aguadilla, Puerto Rico.

== See also ==
- 22nd Senate of Puerto Rico
