= William Córdova Chirino =

Puerto Rican politician

Member of the Puerto Rico Senate from the San Juan district
- In office 1945–1948

Member of the Puerto Rico Senate from at-large district
- In office 1952–1956

Personal details
- Born: January 11, 1903 Aguas Buenas, Puerto Rico
- Died: March 12, 1984 (aged 81) Woodbridge, Virginia
- Party: Popular Democratic Party (PPD); Puerto Rican Independence Party (PIP)
- Occupation: Producer; Broadcaster; legislator

William Córdova Chirino (January 11, 1903 – March 12, 1984) was a producer, radio producer, author, and former senator.

== Broadcasting career ==
Along with his brothers Jacobo and Luis, Córdova produced and hosted the program Industrias Nativas on the stations WKAQ, WIAC, and WAPA. In 1922, during the inauguration of Puerto Rico's first radio station, WKAQ, Ladislao Martínez, also known as "El Maestro Ladi," played the cuatro on Industrias Nativas. This marked the first time the Puerto Rican public heard a cuatro on the radio. In addition, Córdova worked with his brothers as a news announcer on the morning program of WAPA Radio.

== Politics ==
Córdova was elected to the Senate of Puerto Rico as a member of the Popular Democratic Party in the 1944 elections. During his four-year term from 1945 to 1948, he presided over the Commission of Printed Materials and Registered Laws. In 1945, he was among the Popular Democratic Party legislators who supported the Tydings Bill, which proposed granting independence to Puerto Rico.

Later in the term, he disaffiliated from the Popular Democratic Party and collaborated with Gilberto Concepción de Gracia in the founding of the Puerto Rican Independence Party, which he joined from that point onward. As a member of the Independence Party, he was elected to the Senate by accumulation in the 1952 elections.

After his political career, he returned to work in the entertainment and publicity industries.

== Death ==
William Córdova Chirino died on March 12, 1984, at a nursing home in Woodbridge, Virginia, at the age of 81.
