= Calixto Calero Juarbe =

Puerto Rican politician

Member of the Puerto Rico Senate from the at-large district
- In office 1977–1984

Personal details
- Born: April 16, 1936 Isabela, Puerto Rico
- Died: May 3, 2005 (aged 69) Aguadilla, Puerto Rico
- Party: New Progressive Party
- Other political affiliations: Democratic
- Education: Pontifical Catholic University of Puerto Rico School of Law (JD)
- Profession: Politician, Lawyer

Calixto Calero Juarbe (April 16, 1936 – May 3, 2005) was a lawyer, accountant and a former at-large senator in the Puerto Rico Senate.

== Early life and education ==
Calixto Calero Juarbe was born in Isabela, Puerto Rico. He earned a bachelor's degree in Business Administration. In 1963, he graduated from the Pontifical Catholic University of Puerto Rico School of Law in Ponce, Puerto Rico, with a degree in law. This is the first graduating class in Law from that institution.

In addition, he was an accountant, cooperative inspector, income tax inspector, worked as commissioner of the Puerto Rico Police and was a member of the Cooperative Development Board.

He was a member of the Phi Epsilon Chi fraternity.

== Politics ==
In the political sphere and in public service, by 1967, he participated in the pro statehood movement and was a founding member of the New Progressive Party. He served as president of the collective in the Municipality of Isabela. He was leader of the District of Aguadilla of the New Progressive Party.

He was elected at-large senator at the 1976 elections. He was president of the Consumer Affairs Committee and vice president of the Senate Finance Committee. He was re-elected in the 1980 elections and served as NPP Spokesperson on the Consumer Affairs Committee.

Calero Juarbe was a fiery politician who, due to his experience as a criminal lawyer, carried out very intense interrogations and is remembered for his participation in the first phase of the hearings that the Senate Judiciary Commission held in 1983 on the events of the Cerro Maravilla murders, where he defended the position of the administration of then governor Carlos Romero Barceló.

He help led a group of New Progressive Party leaders called "PNP invasion" to the Democrat Party conventions to take the local party's control.

With the participation of the Puerto Rican Renewal Party causing a division within the New Progressive Party led to him to lost his seat in the senate. He attempted a return to the legislature but was not successful, and he went back to his law practice.

== Death ==
He died on May 3, 2005, in Aguadilla, Puerto Rico at the age of 69.
