= Rafael Martí Nuñez =

Puerto Rican politician

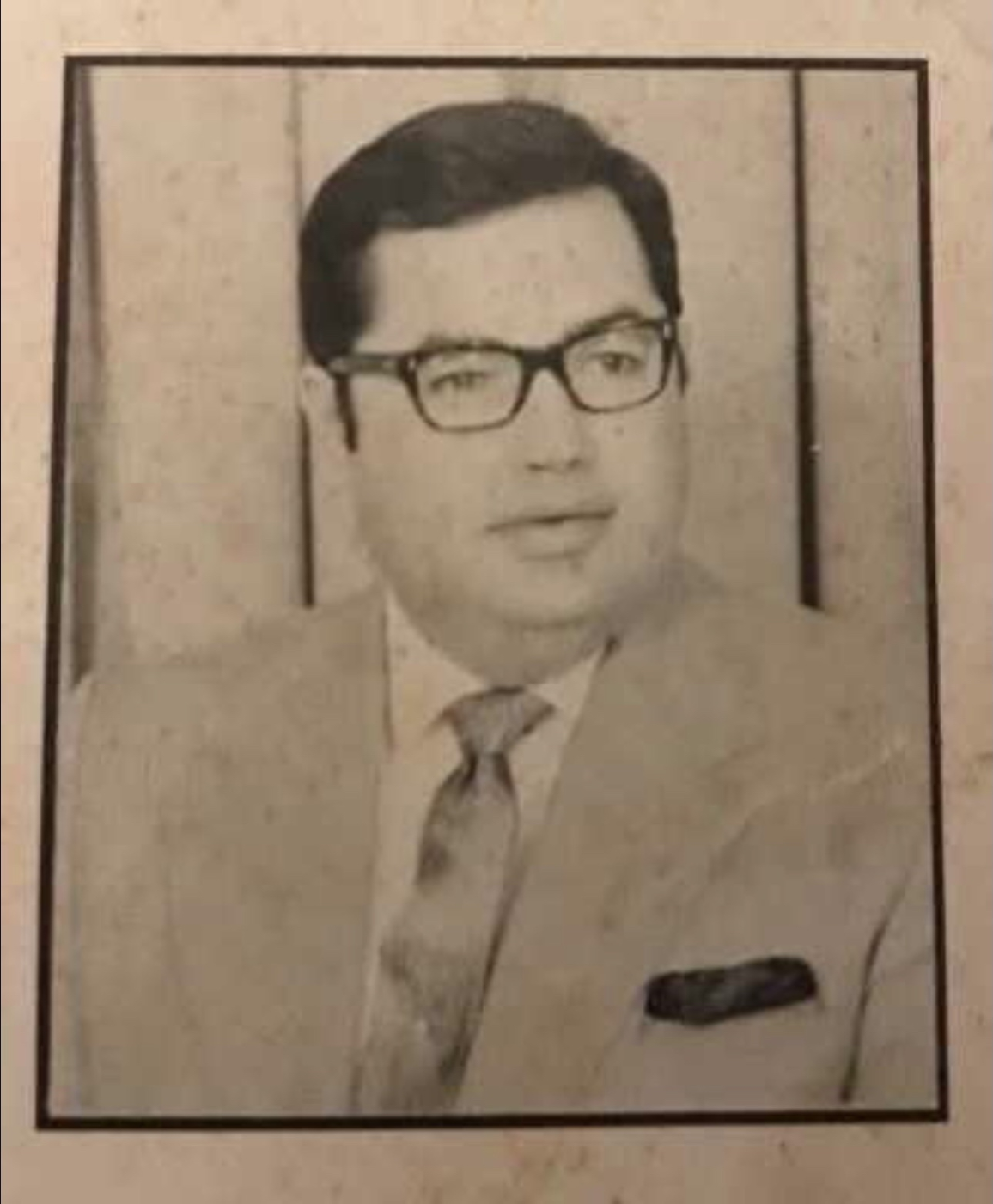

Member of the Puerto Rico Senate from the Humacao district
- In office 1973–1976

Personal details
- Born: January 28, 1932 Caguas, Puerto Rico
- Died: May 17, 2008 (aged 76)
- Party: Popular Democratic Party
- Education: University of Zaragoza (MD)
- Profession: Doctor, Politician, Senator

Military service
- Allegiance: United States of America
- Branch/service: Army National Guard
- Rank: Captain

Rafael Martí Nuñez, born on January 28, 1932, in Caguas, Puerto Rico, was a Puerto Rican doctor and politician elected to the Puerto Rico Senate for the Humacao District.

== Education and career ==
Graduated from the School of Medicine of the University of Zaragoza in Spain in 1960. He practiced as a Doctor of Medicine and Surgery, a specialist in Internal Medicine and Cardiology. Served as a medical officer in the Puerto Rico National Guard until 1964 with the rank of captain.

== Career in politics ==
Rafael Martí Nuñez ran for senator to fill a vacancy caused the death of senator Yldefonso Solá Morales for the Guayama district. He was not elected. In 1972 since Caguas where he lived was moved to the Humacao district he ran and was elected. He chaired the Senate Health and Welfare Commission from 1973 to 1976. After his time in the Senate he returned to the private medical practice.

== Death ==
He died on May 17, 2008, at the age of 76. He was buried at Monte Calvario Cemetery in Caguas.
