= Mario Gaztambide =

American politician (1949–2005)

Member of the Puerto Rico Senate from the Bayamón district
- In office 1969–1972

Personal details
- Born: July 17, 1917 Añasco, Puerto Rico
- Died: March 3, 2001 (aged 83) San Juan, Puerto Rico
- Party: New Progressive Party
- Other political affiliations: Republican
- Spouse: Miriam Beatriz Añeses
- Children: 3
- Education: University of Puerto Rico at Mayagüez (BAgr)
- Profession: Politician, Senator

Military service
- Allegiance: United States of America
- Branch/service: United States Army
- Rank: Captain
- Battles/wars: World War II

Mario Florencio Gaztambide Arrillaga (July 17, 1917 – March 3, 2001) was a Puerto Rican politician. He was a member businessman, civic leader, politician, and senator of the Senate of Puerto Rico from 1969 till 1972.

== Early life and education ==
Mario Gaztambide was born in the western Puerto Rico town of Añasco, Puerto Rico in 1917. He was a United States Army veteran of World War II, who served with the rank of Captain. He studied agronomy and industrial arts at the University of Puerto Rico at Mayagüez.

== Business endeavors ==
Gaztambide served as president of the Association of Coffee Producers of Mayagüez and later, in his profession as a cabinetmaker, he became a successful industrialist who developed businesses in furniture production and trade. He was the president of several companies in that field, including Gaztambide Furniture Enterprises, Furniture Supermarts, and Hato Rey Commercial.

== Politics ==
He was the leader of the Popular Democratic Party in Río Piedras, but later joined the Republican Statehood Party and when Ferré left that party in 1967. He was one the founding members of the New Progressive Party.

He ran for senator for the Bayamón District in the general elections of November 1968, and was elected. During the term from 1969 to 1972, he served as the spokesperson for the New Progressive Party in the Committee on Industry and Commerce. He was also a member of the Finance Committee.

He was a delegate at the 1972 Republican National Convention in Miami, Florida.

== Later life ==
After politics he went back to resumed the management of his businesses. He was also governor of the Rotary International in Puerto Rico from 1956 to 1957.

== Death ==
He died March 3, 2001 in San Juan, Puerto Rico at the age of 83. He was buried at Buxeda Memorial Park Cemetery in Río Piedras, Puerto Rico.

== Legacy ==
The linear park of the city of Bayamón, located in the basin of the Bayamón River, was designated with its name.
