= Modesto Agosto Alicea =

Puerto Rican politician

Member of the Puerto Rico Senate from the Ponce district
- In office 1997–2008

Personal details
- Born: December 7, 1943 Comerío, Puerto Rico
- Died: October 22, 2016 (aged 72) Rincón, Puerto Rico
- Party: Popular Democratic Party
- Education: Interamerican University of Puerto Rico - San Germán Campus (BBA)
- Profession: Politician, Senator

Modesto Agosto Alicea (December 7, 1943 – October 22, 2016) was a Puerto Rican politician and senator. He was a member of the Senate of Puerto Rico from 1997 to 2005 representing the Popular Democratic Party (PPD).

== Early years and studies ==
Modesto Agosto Alicea was born on December 7, 1943, in Comerío, Puerto Rico. He studied at the Horace Mann Tower Elementary School in Comerío, and then finished his high school at the Gabriela Mistral High School in Río Piedras. Agosto then received an associate degree in Business Administration and Accounting from the Interamerican University of Puerto Rico in San Germán.

== Professional career ==
Agosto worked as Senior Project Engineer for Telecom Engineering Consultants and Bemac Technical Services during the 1970s and 1980s. From the mid-1980s to 1997, he worked as an Engineering Supervisor at the Puerto Rico Telephone Company.

== Political career ==
Agosto was elected to the Senate of Puerto Rico for the first time in 1996 general elections, representing the District of Ponce, along with Bruno Ramos. They were both reelected in 2000. During that term, Agosto presided the Commission of Treasury at the Senate.

Agosto and Ramos were reelected again in the 2004 general elections. During that term, Agosto presided the Commissions of Treasury, Health and Women Affairs, Agriculture, Natural Resources and Environmental Quality, among others.

Agosto and Ramos lost their place in the PPD ballot after losing at the 2008 PPD primaries.

Agosto died on October 22, 2016, of Esophageal cancer, at the age of 72 in Rincón, Puerto Rico.
