= Chemo Soto =

Puerto Rican politician (1943–2021)

Mayor of Canóvanas
- In office January 2, 1993 – June 28, 2014
- Preceded by: Estebán Meléndez
- Succeeded by: Lornna Soto

Personal details
- Born: José Ramón Soto Rivera; December 17, 1943 Loíza, Puerto Rico
- Died: December 27, 2021 (aged 78) Río Piedras, Puerto Rico
- Party: New Progressive Party (PNP)
- Spouse: Delia Villanueva
- Children: 9
- Education: Interamerican University of Puerto Rico (AS)
- Occupation: Politician
- Police career
- Department: Puerto Rico Police
- Rank: Patrolmen
- Military career
- Allegiance: United States
- Branch: United States Army
- Rank: PFC
- Conflicts: Vietnam War

José Ramón "Chemo" Soto Rivera (December 17, 1943 – December 27, 2021) was a Puerto Rican politician who was the mayor of Canóvanas from 1993 to 2014, Puerto Rico and a member of the New Progressive Party.

== Early years and work ==
Soto was born in Loíza, Puerto Rico to Ramón Soto Segarra and Rosa Rivera Carrión. He was the sixth of eleven children born to the couple. Soto began his studies at the Cambalache elementary school, and then attended the Eugenio María de Hostos Junior High School and Andrés Flores López High School in Canóvanas, Puerto Rico.

Soto served with the United States Army in the Vietnam War. After his military service, he became a police officer in the Puerto Rico Police Department. Soto also studied at Puerto Rico Junior College, completing a degree in Criminology. He also completed an associate degree in Economy and Physical Education from the Interamerican University of Puerto Rico.

In 1978, Soto started working as a private investigator for various banking institutions like First Federal Savings Bank, Banco de Ponce, and Best Finance. He also became involved in the sports field in the town, and eventually became a leader in the community. This prompted him to seek public office in 1992.

== Political career ==
Soto began his tenure as mayor of Canóvanas when he was elected at the 1992 Puerto Rican general election. He beat candidates Estéban Meléndez (PPD) and Eduardo Betancourt (PIP) to win the seat. He was reelected five consecutive times (1996, 2000, 2004, 2008, and 2012) making him one of the longest tenured mayors in the island.

During his time in office, Soto became known for his fervent belief in the existence of the Chupacabra. Since the 1990s, Soto claimed that the mythical creature roamed the terrains of Canóvanas. Ever since, he organized various expeditions to search for it, without success.

In 2014, Soto announced his intention to retire from politics. He was succeeded as mayor by his daughter, Lornna Soto. However, the next year, Soto announced he would aspire to a seat in the Senate of Puerto Rico, but he was defeated in the 2016 primaries.

== Personal life and death ==
Soto has nine children from several relationships. One of his daughters, Lornna Soto, was a Puerto Rican Senator and eventually succeeded him as mayor of Canóvanas. She is his daughter with Delia "Niní" Villanueva. His other children include Cristal and Christian "Chemito" Soto Mujica. In 2012, Christian pleaded guilty to drug trafficking charges in US Federal Court. As of 2021, "Chemo" Soto was in a relationship with Crucita Rentas.

Soto died on December 27, 2021, at the age of 78 after having health issues for several months. He was inserted at the New Canóvanas Municipal Cemetery in Canóvanas, Puerto Rico.

== Legacy ==
A high school at the San Isidro ward of Canóvanas, was named after him, as the "José Ramón Soto Rivera High School".
