= Rubén Rivera Ramos =

Member of the Puerto Rico Senate from the At-large district
- In office 1965–1968

Member of the Puerto Rico Senate from the Bayamón district
- In office 1969–1972

Member of the Puerto Rico House of Representatives from the 6rd district
- In office 1961–1964
- Succeeded by: Benjamin Ortiz

Personal details
- Born: March 7, 1927 Comerío, Puerto Rico
- Died: September 9, 2012 (aged 85) Bayamón, Puerto Rico
- Party: Popular Democratic Party (PPD); Partido Estadista Republicano (PER); New Progressive Party (PNP)
- Education: New York Law School (JD)

Military service
- Allegiance: United States of America
- Branch/service: United States Army
- Rank: Private first class

Rubén Rivera Ramos was a Puerto Rican legislator who served in the Puerto Rico Senate and in the Puerto Rico House of Representatives.

== Early life and education ==
Born on March 7, 1927, in Comerío, Puerto Rico. He did his primary and secondary school in Comerio and at Morris High School in Bronx, New York. He did his college studies at Wagner College in New York and at the University of Puerto Rico, and he earned his law degree from New York Law School . Lawyer-Notary. Served in the United States Army during World War II.

== Professional life ==
He was president of the Hispanic Charitable Association of New York from 1950 to 1952. He also led the New York Proportional Representation Movement. He worked as a psychiatric social worker in the New York Department of Mental Hygiene. He was president of the Puerto Rico Mental Hygiene Association.

== Politics ==
In the 1960 election, he was elected as a member of the House of Representatives for Bayamón's 6th district. Between 1961 and 1964, he spent four years representing the Popular Democratic Party and later joined the Republican Statehood Party. He was part of the Legal; Health and Welfare; and Elections and Personnel committees.

He was elected to Puerto Rico Senate as an senator At-large for the Republican Statehood Party in the 1964 elections. In the four-year term from 1965 to 1968. He was also elected to Puerto Rico Senate from the Bayamón district from 1969 to 1972, he was the New Progressive Party spokesperson on the Agriculture Committee and was part of the Appointments; Instruction and Culture; and Rules and Calendar Committees. He was not reelected in 1972 and went back to his profession in law.

== Death ==
Rubén Rivera Ramos died on September 9, 2012, in Bayamón, Puerto Rico, at the age of 85. He was buried at the Puerto Rico National Cemetery in Bayamón.
