= Felipe Colón Díaz =

Puerto Rican lawyer (1877–1946)

Member of the Puerto Rico Senate from the Ponce district
- In office 1941–1944

Personal details
- Born: August 23, 1877 Juana Díaz, Puerto Rico
- Died: September 16, 1946 (aged 69) Ponce, Puerto Rico
- Party: Partido Republicano Puro; Alianza Puertorriqueña; Popular Democratic Party

Felipe Benicio Colón Díaz (August 23, 1877, in Juana Díaz, Puerto Rico – September 16, 1946, in Ponce, Puerto Rico) was a Puerto Rican lawyer, businessperson, public official, senator, judge and politician.

== Early life ==
Felipe Colón Díaz was born in the Capitanejo area of Juana Díaz on August 23, 1877. Lived in Coamo, Puerto Rico during his youth.

== Career ==
Colón Díaz served as a Librarian and Constable of the courts of Coamo and Ponce. Later on then became Court Secretary and Judge. By 1917, he was the Secretary of the Military Registration Board in Coamo. In 1913, at the age of 36, he completed all the exams to become a lawyer. Between 1918 and 1922 he served as secretary of the District Court. He became a judge in Ponce.

He began his political career within the Puerto Rican Republican Party, from which he separated in 1924 in opposition to its merger with the Union Party of Puerto Rico. In 1924 he was one founders of Partido Republicano Puro (Pure Republican Party). He was a member of the Territorial Committee of the party that was officially known as the Historical Constitutional Party. In 1932, he actively worked on the merger of his party with the Alianza Puertorriqueña (Puerto Rican Alliance), which resulted in the founding of the Republican Union Party.

As a result of the events known as 'the Ponce Massacre', it is established that the committee is organized by friends and colleagues of Muñoz Marín from Ponce, and Colón Díaz, who at that time was a Republican lawyer with an office in Ponce, is the one who presides over the Ponce Citizens Committee for the Defense of Civil Rights.

He was one of the founding fathers of the Popular Democratic Party in 1938. He was elected to the Puerto Rico Senate in 1940 for the Ponce District. He was the president of two Senate Committees, the Judiciary Committee; and the Committee on Insular and Municipal Government and Elections. Did not seek reelection in 1944.

== Death ==
Felipe Colón Díaz died on September 16, 1946, in Ponce, Puerto Rico at the age of 69. He was buried at Cementerio Católico San Vicente de Paul in Ponce.

== Legacy ==
An intermediate school located in the town of Juana Díaz is named after Felipe Colón Díaz in his honor.
