= Palmira Cabrera de Ibarra =

Puerto Rican politician

Member of the Puerto Rico Senate from the Arecibo district
- In office January 2, 1961 – March 7, 1969

Personal details
- Born: May 12, 1903 Vega Alta, Puerto Rico
- Died: December 26, 1995 (aged 92)
- Party: Popular Democratic Party (PPD)
- Education: University of Puerto Rico (BA); Interamerican University of Puerto Rico School of Law (JD)
- Profession: Politician, teacher, lawyer

Palmira Cabrera de Ibarra was a Puerto Rican politician from the Popular Democratic Party (PPD). Cabrera de Ibarra was the first woman to serve as member of the Senate of Puerto Rico from 1960 to 1968 in the Arecibo Senatorial district.

== Early years and studies ==
She was born in the Cienegueta ward of Vega Alta on May 12, 1903. Her parents were Lorenzo Cabrera and Plácida Vázquez. Her father was mayor of Vega Alta from 1920 to 1924. She studied until eighth grade in Vega Alta; Secondary grades he studied at the University of Puerto Rico High School in Río Piedras. After graduating, he began teaching in the Candelaria neighborhood at the young age of 19. Later on she entered the University of Puerto Rico and graduated from the Normal Course, becoming an English teacher in the urban area of Vega Alta. In 1940, he completed the B.A. in Pedagogy at the University of Puerto Rico. In 1964 she earned a Juris Doctor from the Interamerican University of Puerto Rico School of Law.

== Professional career ==
After years of teaching she was appointed district school superintendent. Later on she began a career as a lawyer with law offices in Río Piedras and in Vega Alta. She worked at the Vega Alta Red Cross, The Puerto Rico teacher's association, founded the Union of American Women chapter of Puerto Rico and president of the University of Puerto Rico alumni Association. Palmira Cabrera also represented the Puerto Rico Department of Public Instruction at the National Education Association annual conventions.

== Politics ==
Palmira Cabrera de Ibarra was a member of the Popular Democratic Party. Was elected in the 1960 elections to the Senate of Puerto Ricofor the Arecibo senatorial district. In the same process she became the first woman elected as district senator in the history of the Puerto Rico Senate.
