= Jorge Alberto Ramos Comas =

Puerto Rican politician

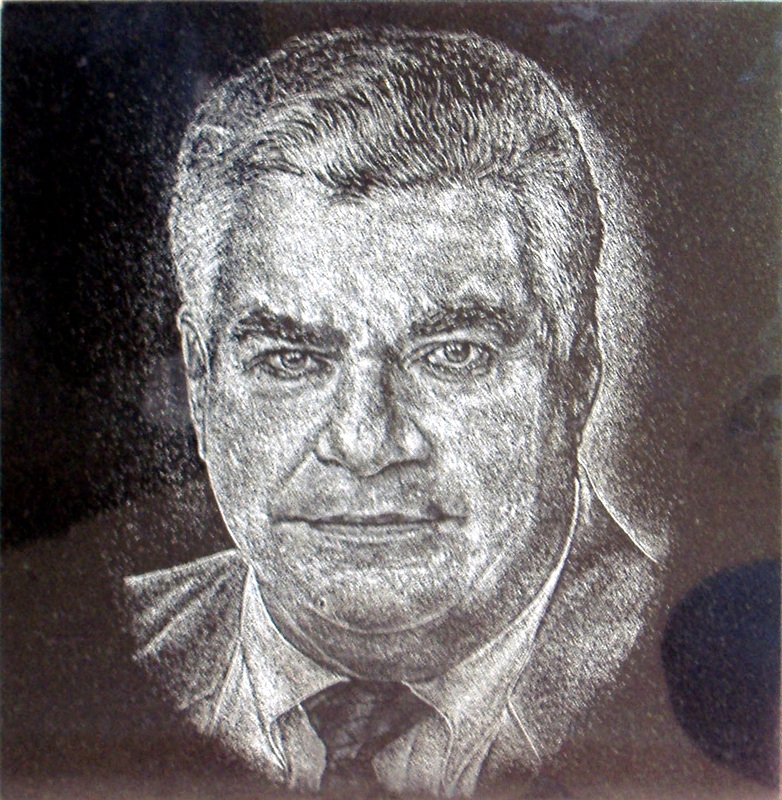
- Hand-etched portrait over black granite

Member of the Puerto Rico Senate from the Mayagüez district
- In office 1997 – 2000 (died in office)

Mayor of San Germán, Puerto Rico
- In office 1981-1996
- Preceded by: José del Carmen Alemañy
- Succeeded by: Isaac Llantín Ballester

Member of the Puerto Rico House of Representatives from the 20th District
- In office 1972-1976
- Preceded by: Milagros González Chapel
- Succeeded by: Antonio Fas Alzamora

Personal details
- Born: September 11, 1946 Mayagüez, Puerto Rico
- Died: August 20, 2000 (aged 53)
- Party: Popular Democratic Party
- Spouse: Minerva Vélez Jusino
- Children: Jurisam; Jorge
- Education: Pontifical Catholic University of Puerto Rico (BSS)
- Profession: Politician, Senator

Jorge Alberto Ramos Comas (September 11, 1946 – August 20, 2000) was a Puerto Rican politician and former senator. He was a member of the Senate of Puerto Rico from 1997 to 2000 representing the Popular Democratic Party (PPD).

== Early years and studies ==
Jorge Alberto Ramos Comas was born on September 11, 1946, in Mayagüez, Puerto Rico. He finished his elementary and high school in his hometown. In 1968, Ramos received a Bachelor's degree in Social Science from the Pontifical Catholic University of Puerto Rico.

== Professional career ==
Ramos worked for five years for the Puerto Rico Department of Education. As a library teacher, he contributed to the creation of a rural newspaper.

Ramos also worked as an instructor of a federal program with the Aqueduct and Sewer Authority of Puerto Rico.

== Political career ==
=== Representative: 1972-1976 ===
Ramos began his political career at the age of 24 when he ran for the Puerto Rico House of Representatives at the 1972 general elections. He served as representative from 1972 to 1976 for the 20th District (Cabo Rojo, Lajas and San Germán).

=== Mayor of San Germán: 1981-1996 ===
Ramos Comas ran for mayor of San Germán at the 1980 general elections. He was elected and sworn on January 12, 1981. He was reelected for the position on 1984, 1988, and 1992, finishing his last term in 1996.

=== Senator: 1997-2000 ===
After serving four terms as Mayor of San Germán, Ramos Comas decided to run for the Senate of Puerto Rico, representing the District of Mayagüez. He was elected at the 1996 general elections.

== Death and legacy ==
Ramos Comas died on August 20, 2000, at the age of 53. He was three months away from finishing his term as senator.

On August 21, 2011, the Senate dedicated the opening of their second ordinary session to Ramos Comas. They also named a legislative internship after him. The same day, the Senate also approved a bill to rename an avenue in San Germán after Ramos Comas.

== Personal life ==
Ramos Comas was married to Minerva Vélez Jusino. They had two children together: Jurisam and Jorge. The latter was also a member of the Senate of Puerto Rico from 2001 to 2004.
