= Margarita Ostolaza =

Puerto Rican politician

Member of the Puerto Rico Senate from the San Juan district
- In office 2001–2005

Personal details
- Born: Cayey, Puerto Rico
- Party: Popular Democratic Party (PPD)
- Education: University of Puerto Rico (BA); New York University; National Autonomous University of Mexico (Ph.D.)
- Occupation: Politician, Senator, Professor

Margarita Ostolaza Bey is a former member of the Senate of Puerto Rico.

Margarita Ostolaza was born in Cayey, Puerto Rico. After carrying out her graduate studies at New York University (NYU) earning a Master of Political Science, she started teaching in the Cayey campus of the University of Puerto Rico where in 1986, she founded the Project for Studies of Women. Afterwards, she finished her doctoral studies at the National Autonomous University of Mexico. Her specialty is political sociology. In 1989, with the editorial assistance of Ediciones Huracán, she published her book "Política Sexual en Puerto Rico" (Sexual Policy in Puerto Rico).

Ostolaza teaches at the University of Puerto Rico Río Piedras campus. A former member of the Puerto Rican Independence Party (PIP), professor Ostolaza was elected Senator from the district of San Juan in the 2000 elections as a candidate of the Popular Democratic Party (PDP). During her only term in the Senate, she chaired the Committee on Education, and the Committee on Science and Culture. In 2004, she was unsuccessful in her reelection bid, when she and her running mate, Sen. José Ortiz Dalliot were succeeded by the candidates of the PNP Roberto Arango and Carlos Díaz.

In 2008, Ostolaza ran again, this time for Senator at-large, in the PPD's March 2008 primaries, appearing in the ballot's No. 12 slot. However, she lost, ending in 8th place, with 6th place or higher being required to win. After that, she has contributed as a columnist for El Nuevo Día. She is also President of the PPD Women in the District of San Juan.

== Sources ==
- Margarita Ostolaza 2008 Campaign Site (In Spanish)
- Facultad Ciencias Sociales UPR
