= Josefina Ojeda de Batlle =

Senator of Puerto Rico

Member of the Puerto Rico Senate from the at-large district
- In office 1965–1968

Personal details
- Born: June 1, 1910 Fajardo, Puerto Rico
- Died: February 7, 1972 (aged 61) San Juan, Puerto Rico
- Party: Popular Democratic Party
- Spouse: Salvador Batlle Pérez
- Education: University of Puerto Rico (B.Ed)
- Profession: Teacher, Politician

Josefina Ojeda de Batlle (June 1, 1910 - February 7, 1972) was a Puerto Rican teacher, politician and senator.

== Early years and studies ==
Josefina Ojeda de Batlle was born in Fajardo, Puerto Rico. He completed her primary education in Fajardo and then graduated with a bachelor's degree in education from the University of Puerto Rico. She taught for several years in the Department of Public Instruction.

== Politics ==
She was one of the political leaders related to the political structure led by San Juan Mayor Felisa Rincón de Gautier. In the 1948 elections, she was elected as a member of the Board of Commissioners of the Municipality and was re-elected in the elections of 1952, 1956, and 1960. She served as Vice President of the Board of Commissioners from 1953 to 1964.

In 1964 she was elected as an at-large senator to the Puerto Rico Senate. During her four-year period from 1965 to 1968, she was appointed Vice President of the Education and the Public Safety Commissions.

== Death ==
Josefina Ojeda de Batlle died on February 7, 1972, in San Juan, Puerto Rico at age 61.
