= Jesús Santa Aponte =

Puerto Rican politician

Member of the Puerto Rico Senate from the Humacao district
- In office 1977–1992

Mayor of San Lorenzo
- In office 1965–1968
- In office 1973–1976

Personal details
- Born: April 5, 1935 San Lorenzo, Puerto Rico
- Died: December 5, 2021 (aged 86) Caguas, Puerto Rico
- Party: Popular Democratic Party
- Spouse: Altagracia Rodríguez
- Children: (4) Jesús Félix, Jesús Jafet, Jesús Benjamín and Jesús Santa Rodríguez
- Profession: Educator, Politician, Senator,

Jesús Santa Aponte born on January 28, 1932, in San Lorenzo, Puerto Rico was educator and Politician elected to the Puerto Rico Senate for the Humacao District.

== Early years ==
Jesús Santa Aponte was born on April 5, 1935 in San Lorenzo, Puerto Rico. In 1958, Santa Aponte obtained a Diploma in Elementary Education that enabled him to work as a teacher in Puerto Rico's public schools. His first experience as an educator was at the Quebrada Arenas Unit, a remote neighborhood of San Lorenzo. He later earned a bachelor's degree in Education.

== Politics ==
He was elected mayor of San Lorenzo, Puerto Rico serving from 1965 till 1968 and from 1973 till 1976. Did not seek reelection for mayor of San Lorenzo in 1976 to run for senator for the Humacao District. Got elected for the Humacao District serving from 1977 until 1992. During his years as a Senator, he chaired the Housing Commission from 1981 to 1992, was Acting President and Vice President of the Appointments Commission; Secretary of the Commission for Socioeconomic Development, Corporations and Municipalities; and Secretary of the Consumer Affairs Committee. Shortly before the end of his term in the Senate, he resigned his seat and was appointed to the position of Commissioner of the Public Service Commission, a position from which he retired in the four-year term from 1993 to 1996.

== Death ==
He died on December 5, 2021 in Caguas, Puerto Rico after suffering a long illness at the age of 86.
