= Leo Díaz Urbina =

Puerto Rican politician

Chair of the Puerto Rico New Progressive Party
- In office 2001–2001
- Preceded by: Norma Burgos
- Succeeded by: Carlos Pesquera

At-Large Member of the Puerto Rico House of Representatives
- In office January 13, 1997 – January 14, 2001

Member of the Puerto Rico House of Representatives from the 3rd District
- In office January 11, 1993 – January 13, 1997
- Preceded by: Rosa M. Ramírez Pantojas
- Succeeded by: Albita Rivera Ramírez

Personal details
- Born: Leonides Díaz Urbina; October 6, 1962 (age 63) Río Piedras, Puerto Rico
- Party: New Progressive Party
- Other political affiliations: Republican
- Spouse: Zulma Ivelisse Fuster Troche
- Children: Leonides Sebastián; Patricia Victoria; Isabella Cristina
- Education: University of Puerto Rico (BSS); University of Puerto Rico School of Law (JD)
- Occupation: Lawyer; politician
- Nickname: Leo

Leonides "Leo" Díaz Urbina (Note: In this Spanish name, the first or paternal surname is Díaz and the second or maternal family name is Urbina.) (born October 6, 1962) is a Puerto Rican lawyer and politician who served as a legislator in the 24th and 25th House of Representatives of Puerto Rico, and as president of the New Progressive Party of Puerto Rico (PNP) in 2001. Diaz, was candidate for mayor of San Juan in 2016.

== Biography ==
Díaz Urbina was born in Río Piedras, Puerto Rico, where his father, Leonides Díaz, was the owner of a grocer's shop and his mother, Gilberta Urbina Guzmán, a housewife. He has a bachelor's degree in social sciences with a minor in political science from the University of Puerto Rico, Rio Piedras Campus and a juris doctor from the University of Puerto Rico School of Law.

In 1987, he was elected president of the National Association of Law Students, Rio Piedras Chapter. He was also elected as president of the student council for the University of Puerto Rico School of Law.

In 1990, he was elected as municipal legislator for the municipal legislative assembly of San Juan, as president of the New Progressive Party of Puerto Rico for the representative district III of San Juan, and as president of the Republican Party for the same district.

In 1992, he was elected as a Representative for the same district in the 1992 general election. He was sworn on January 11, 1993, effectively becoming an official member of the 24th House of Representatives of Puerto Rico. As a member of the 24th House, Díaz Urbina presided the Commission of the Civil and Judiciary, now simply called the House of Representatives of Puerto Rico Commission of the Judiciary, and the Commission for the Development of San Juan, now called the House of Representatives of Puerto Rico Commission on Integrated Development of the Capital City.

In 1996, he was elected as a representative at-large in the 1996 general election. He was sworn on January 13, 1997, effectively becoming an official member of the 25th House of Representatives of Puerto Rico.

In 1999, he decided to no longer run for the House of Representatives but publicly supported and campaigned for Carlos Pesquera, then gubernatorial candidate for the New Progressive Party. In 2001, after Pesquera lost, he was elected President of the New Progressive Party, although he was later succeeded by Pesquera, who was one of the NPP candidates in the 2004 elections.

Diaz, was candidate for mayor of San Juan in 2016.

== Personal life ==
Díaz Urbina married Zulma Ivelisse Fuster Troche, a prosecutor for the district of San Juan, in 1997. They have three children, Leonides Sebastián (born in 2000), Patricia Victoria (born in 2001) and Isabella Cristina (born in 2006).

== Notes ==
House of Representatives of Puerto Rico
Preceded by Rosa M. Ramírez Pantojas	Member of the Puerto Rico House of Representatives from the 3rd district 1993–1997	Succeeded by Albita Rivera Ramírez
Party political offices
Preceded by Norma Burgos	Chair of the Puerto Rico New Progressive Party; 1999-2000	Succeeded by Carlos Pesquera
