= René Muñoz Padín =

Puerto Rican politician

Member of the Puerto Rico Senate from the San Juan district
- In office January 2, 1965 – January 2, 1969

Member of the Puerto Rico House of Representatives from the 5th District
- In office January 2, 1953 – January 2, 1961
- Preceded by: Heraclio M. Rivera
- Succeeded by: Benjamin Ortiz

Personal details
- Born: January 2, 1925 Las Marías, Puerto Rico
- Died: March 8, 2011 (aged 86) Hato Rey, Puerto Rico
- Party: Popular Democratic Party
- Other political affiliations: Democratic
- Education: University of Puerto Rico (BA); University of Puerto Rico School of Law (JD)
- Profession: Attorney, politician

René Muñoz Padín (born January 2, 1925, in Las Marías, Puerto Rico and died on March 8, 2011, in Hato Rey, Puerto Rico) was a Puerto Rican politician who served Puerto Rico Senate and in the Puerto Rico House of Representatives.

== Early years ==
He was born in town of Las Marias on January 2, 1925. He attended primary and secondary school in his hometown, and his higher education at Central High in Santurce. He earned a Bachelor of Arts degree from the University of Puerto Rico and a Juris Doctor from the University of Puerto Rico School of Law.

== Political career ==
Muñoz Padín was an assistant to the then mayor of San Juan, Felisa Rincón de Gautier, and press director to the then president of the Senate Miguel Hernández Agosto. He was elected to the Puerto Rico House of Representatives from the 5th District from 1953 to 1961 and to the Puerto Rico Senate for the San Juan District from 1965 to 1969. He was also president of the Association of Retirees of the Government of Puerto Rico.

Before joining the Popular Democratic Party (PPD), in the 50s, Muñoz Padín had been a member of the Nationalist Party of Puerto Rico.

== Death ==
He died on March 8, 2011, at Auxilio Mutuo Hospital in Hato Rey, Puerto Rico after suffering a long-time illness, he was age 86. He was buried at Cementerio Borinquen Memorial in Caguas, Puerto Rico.
