= Bruno Ramos (politician) =

Senator of Puerto Rico

Member of the Puerto Rico Senate from the Ponce district
- In office 1997–2005

Majority Whip of the Senate of Puerto Rico
- In office 2001–2004
- Preceded by: Carlos Dávila López
- Succeeded by: Carlos Pagán

Personal details
- Born: Bruno A. Ramos Olivera; December 4, 1950 (age 75) Adjuntas, Puerto Rico
- Party: Popular Democratic Party
- Spouse: Eneida Montero
- Children: 2
- Education: Pontifical Catholic University of Puerto Rico (B.Ed., M.Ed.)
- Profession: Politician, senator

Bruno A. Ramos Olivera (born December 4, 1950, in Adjuntas, Puerto Rico) is a Puerto Rican politician and former senator. He was a member of the Senate of Puerto Rico from 1997 to 2005 representing the Popular Democratic Party (PPD).

== Early years and studies ==
Bruno Ramos was born on December 4, 1950, in Adjuntas, Puerto Rico. He finished his elementary and high school in Utuado. Ramos then received a bachelor's degree in education with a major in mathematics from the Pontifical Catholic University of Puerto Rico. He then completed a master's degree in education from the same college.

== Professional career ==
Ramos has worked at several positions in the public education system of Puerto Rico. He served as Title I supervisor, and as a teacher in elementary, junior high, and high school. He also worked as a school director. He has also worked as a professor for the Universidad del Este in Utuado.

== Political career ==
Ramos began his political career as president of the Municipal Assembly of Utuado during the 1992–1996 term. He was elected to the Senate of Puerto Rico for the first time in 1996 general elections, representing the District of Ponce, along with Modesto Agosto Alicea. They were both reelected in 2000.

Agosto and Ramos were reelected again in the 2004 general elections. During that term, Ramos served as speaker of his party on several commissions.

Agosto and Ramos lost their place in the PPD ballot after losing at the 2008 PPD primaries.
