= Norma Burgos =

American politician

Norma Burgos Andújar

Chair of the Puerto Rico New Progressive Party
- In office 2000–2001
- Preceded by: Carlos Pesquera
- Succeeded by: Leonides Díaz Urbina

Member of the Puerto Rico Senate from the At-large district
- In office 2000–2012

Secretary of State of Puerto Rico
- In office 1995–1999
- Governor: Pedro Rosselló
- Preceded by: Baltasar Corrada del Río
- Succeeded by: Angel Morey

Chief of Staff of Puerto Rico
- Incumbent
- Assumed office 2026
- Governor: Jenniffer González-Colón
- Preceded by: Francisco Domenech

Personal details
- Born: October 30, 1954 (age 71) Chicago, Illinois, U.S.
- Party: New Progressive Party
- Other political affiliations: Democrat
- Children: Roberto; Norman
- Education: University of Puerto Rico (BA, MS)
- Profession: Politician; urban planner; economist

Norma E. Burgos Andújar (born October 30, 1954) is a Puerto Rican politician who currently serves as Chief of Staff of Puerto Rico since August 10, 2026. She had previously served as Puerto Rico’s Secretary of State under Governor Pedro Rosselló from 1995 to 1999 as well as a member of the Senate of Puerto Rico from 2000 to 2012.

== Early years and studies ==
Norma Burgos Andújar was born in Chicago, Illinois, but raised in Puerto Rico. She studied at the University of Puerto Rico at Río Piedras, where she obtained both a bachelor's degree (cum laude) with a major in economy, and a master's degree (magna cum laude) from the University of Puerto Rico's Roberto Sánchez Vilella School of Public Administration. She continued postgraduate studies at the Georgia Institute of Technology and the National Center for Housing Management, where she obtained the title housing administrator. She is also a Licensed Professional Planner.

== Political career ==
Burgos began her political career occupying several positions in the Municipality of San Juan, working for Mayors Carlos Romero Barceló and Hernán Padilla. She worked in areas like municipal administration, statistics, federal ruling, and others.

During the administration of Baltasar Corrada del Río and Héctor Luis Acevedo, she served as executive director of the Corporation for Development of Old San Juan (CODEVISA). She led several projects of restoration and remodeling of squares and public spaces in Old San Juan. She also served as advisor for the Department of Transportation in some projects in public works and public transportation. In addition, she was the executive director of Governor Rafael Hernandez Colon strategic planning project for physical and social infrastructure "Project Puerto Rico 2004"

After Pedro Rosselló was elected Governor of Puerto Rico in 1992, Burgos was appointed as president of the Puerto Rico Planning Board. She remained in that position until 1998. During that time, she presided over several groups like the one in charge of the establishment of the Energy Public Policy, the Implementation of Deregulation in Government, and the New Economic Development Model for Puerto Rico (1994).

=== Secretary of State: 1995-1999 ===
In 1995, Governor Rosselló appointed Burgos to serve as Secretary of State. As Secretary of State, Burgos also served as President of several Special Commissions, such as: the Commission for the Study of a Unicameral Legislature, the Commission for the Study of the Naturopathy Profession, the Accident Prevention and Safety Committee, the Centennial Commission of Puerto Rican Democracy USA-PR, and the Special Commission on the Island of Vieques.

During this time, Burgos was also elected unanimously as vice-president of the party and chaired its Platform Committee in 1996. In 1999, Burgos resigned to her position as Secretary of State to campaign for Senator.

=== Senator: 2000-2012 ===
Burgos was elected to the Senate of Puerto Rico in the 2000 general elections and reelected in 2004. In both occasions, she was the candidate with most votes among all candidates from the two principal/majority parties in Puerto Rico, and the one with most votes among her fellow party candidates. In 2005, she was appointed by Senate President Kenneth McClintock as chair of the Senate Committee on Public Welfare and the Joint Commission on Health Rights, as well as member of several other committees.

At the PNP primaries in 2008, Burgos was the candidate with most votes for the Senate positions. In the 2008 elections she was again re-elected to a third term. She was then appointed by current Senate President Thomas Rivera Schatz as Chairwoman of the Senate Commission for Economic Development and Planning and the Joint Commission on Public Private Partnerships. She is also Vice Chairwoman of the Urban and Infrastructure Committee, and member of the Committees on Finance, Trade and Cooperatives, Women Affairs, Banking, Consumer Affairs and Public Corporations. In addition, she has served on the Joint Commission on Fiscal and Management Audit of Public Funds and the Special Committee on Government Reform of the Senate of Puerto Rico.

In 2008, she served as a member of Puerto Rico's 53-delegate delegation to the Democratic National Convention held in Denver, elected on then-Senator Barack Obama's slate. Burgos was appointed together with Hernandez Mayoral to represent Puerto Rico at the Democratic Platform Committee. She subsequently campaigned for Obama's presidential campaign in Orlando, Florida in a historic campaign swing that brought together pro-statehood Democrats such as her Resident Commissioner Pedro Pierluisi.

=== Mayoral Candidate for the city of Caguas: 2012 ===
Burgos announced her intent to run for the mayoralty of the city of Caguas. Citing the general decay of the city following the death of former mayor William Miranda Marin and during the subsequent term of William Miranda Torres. She has cited that the city currently has a growing budgetary deficit and that the city currently ignores the population of the rural parts of the city. She has promised to bring a "Dynamic Toll Lane" and extension of the "Tren Urbano" to connect Caguas with the rest of the Metropolitan Area. She lost the election.

=== Puerto Rico State Elections Commission; New Progressive Party Elections Commissioner 2016-2019 ===
In 2016 she was appointed as Alternate Electoral Commissioner of the New Progressive Party in the State Elections Commission of Puerto Rico and after three months was promoted to Electoral Commissioner. Under her leadership and a great team of work, it was possible to prevail in 17 cases brought to the Courts. Under her tutelage, her party won the 2016 General Elections and the Statehood option in the 2017 Plebiscite.

== Personal life ==
Norma Burgos is the mother of two sons, Roberto and Norman Benítez, who are federal officials. She has one granddaughter (Stella Sofia) and a grandson (Lucca Enzo).

Political offices
Preceded by Baltasar Corrada del Río	Secretary of State of Puerto Rico; 1995–1999	Succeeded by Angel Morey
Party political offices
Preceded by Carlos Pesquera	Chair of the Puerto Rico New Progressive Party; 2000-2001	Succeeded by Leonides Díaz Urbina
