= Cirilo Tirado Delgado =

Puerto Rican politician (1938–2025)

Member of the Puerto Rico Senate from the Guayama district
- In office 1988–1996

Member of the Puerto Rico House of Representatives from the 30th District
- In office 1973–1985

Personal details
- Born: March 29, 1938 Yabucoa, Puerto Rico
- Died: March 21, 2025 (aged 86) Guayama, Puerto Rico
- Party: Popular Democratic Party
- Education: University of Puerto Rico (B.Ed., M.Ed); Interamerican University of Puerto Rico School of Law (JD)
- Profession: Teacher, Lawyer, Politician, Senator

Cirilo Tirado Delgado (March 29, 1938 – March 21, 2025) was a Puerto Rican politician and attorney. He served as a member of the Puerto Rico House of Representatives (1973–1985) and Senate (1988–1996).

== Life and career ==
Cirilo Tirado Delgado received his Bachelor's and Master's degree in education from the University of Puerto Rico. He then received his Juris Doctor degree from the Interamerican University of Puerto Rico School of Law, passing the bar exam in 1981. Tirado Delgado also served as teacher for the Puerto Rico Department of Education for 15 years. He was a long time member of the local Lions Club.

Tirado Delgado became a member of the Popular Democratic Party (PPD). He was elected to the Puerto Rico House of Representatives in 1973, representing the District of Guayama until 1985. During his tenure in the House of Representatives, he chaired the commissions of Education and Culture; and Constitutional Revision and Civil Rights. During the first months of 1985, he served as part of the Cabinet of Governor Rafael Hernández Colón as President of the Industrial Commission. After that, he served as administrator of the State Insurance Fund Commission until 1988. That year, he ran for Senator for the District of Guayama, at the 1988 general elections. Tirado Delgado was reelected at the 1992 general elections.

Tirado Delgado ran again for Senator at the 1996 elections, but lost to the candidates of the New Progressive Party (PNP). After that, he dedicated to work on his law firm in Guayama, Puerto Rico.

Tirado Delgado was married to Quintina Rivera Montañez, a teacher. His son, Cirilo Tirado Rivera was also a Senator.

Tirado Delgado died in Guayama, Puerto Rico on March 21, 2025, at the age of 89. He was buried at the New Guayama Municipal Cemetery in Guayama, Puerto Rico.
