= Lornna Soto =

Puerto Rican politician

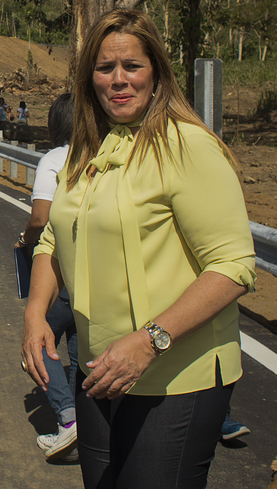
- Soto in 2018

Mayor of Canóvanas
- Incumbent
- Assumed office July 1, 2014
- Preceded by: José "Chemo" Soto

Member of the Puerto Rico Senate from the Carolina district
- In office 2004–2013

Personal details
- Born: May 27, 1970 (age 56) Río Piedras, Puerto Rico
- Party: New Progressive Party
- Other political affiliations: Democratic
- Spouse: Single
- Children: Lorenis Paola; Pamela Julianys
- Education: University of Puerto Rico at Carolina (BA); Universidad del Este (MPA)
- Profession: Politician

Lornna J. Soto Villanueva (born May 27, 1970) is a Puerto Rican politician affiliated with the New Progressive Party (PNP). She is the current mayor of Canóvanas, succeeding her father, José "Chemo" Soto in 2014. Before being mayor, Soto was elected Senator for the district of Carolina in the 2004 general election along with Senator Héctor Martínez Maldonado. She served as Senator until 2013.

== Early years and studies ==
Lornna Soto was born on May 27, 1970, in Río Piedras, Puerto Rico. She is the third of nine children born to José "Chemo" Soto, former mayor of Canóvanas, Puerto Rico, and Delia "Niní" Villanueva. Soto graduated from Luis Hernaiz Veronne High School in Canóvanas. She earned a Bachelor's degree in Finance from the University of Puerto Rico at Carolina and a Master's degree in Public Affairs with a specialty in Public Policy from the Universidad del Este, also in Carolina.

== Political career ==
=== First years in politics ===
In 1997, Soto started working as a special assistant to the then Representative for the 38th District of Trujillo Alto, Carolina, and Canóvanas. She also worked as an adviser for the Commission of Consumer Affairs of the House of Representatives.

In 2001, she worked with the mayors of Fajardo and Río Grande, Aníbal Meléndez Rivera and Emilio Rosa Pacheco, as a public relations adviser. During this year, she was also in charge of the implementation of the Business Development Center from Loíza, an institution that helps the residents of that municipality with employment opportunities. That year, she also started working in the Health Department of San Juan, where she was in charge of the recruiting of municipalities for the creation and implementation of several health programs.

=== Senator: 2004–2012 ===
Soto was elected as a Senator for the District of Carolina at the 2004 general elections. She was sworn in on January 10, 2005.

Soto was re-elected in 2008. During her time in the Senate, Soto has presided the Banking, Consumer Affairs, Public Corporations and Insurance Committees in the senate. In 2012, Soto lost her bid for reelection.

=== Mayor of Canóvanas (2014–present) ===
Lornna Soto was sworn in as mayor of Canóvanas on July 1, 2014. She succeeded her father, José "Chemo" Soto, who had retired earlier that year.

On June 5, 2016, she was nominated as the New Progressive Party's mayoral candidate for a full term, obtaining 54% of the vote in a five-way race.

=== Democratic Party ===
A Democrat, Lornna Soto has attended three Democratic National Conventions, including Denver in 2008, Charlotte in 2012 and Philadelphia in 2016, where she was a delegate representing the Carolina Senatorial District. On April 8, 2016, she was the only woman to file as a candidate for Vice Chair of the Puerto Rico Democratic Party and, along with Democratic activist Francisco Domenech and Democratic National Committeeman Kenneth McClintock has filed a credentials challenge to be recognized as the incumbent Vice Chair. The challenge is pending resolution before the Democratic National Committee and its Credentials Committee.

== Personal life ==
Soto is the divorced mother of two daughters: Lorenis Paola and Pamela Julianys.
