= David Cruz Vélez =

Puerto Rican politician

David Cruz Vélez was an at-large Puerto Rican Senator from 1989 to 1993. He was the first blind New Progressive Party member to form part of a Cabinet when he was the Ombudsman for Persons with Disabilities of Puerto Rico under governor Pedro Rossello Gonzalez. He was a member of Phi Sigma Alpha fraternity. David Cruz Velez earned a B.A. in Psychology from the University of Puerto Rico and a M.A. in Educational Psychology from New York University.
