= Freddy Valentín =

Puerto Rican politician

Freddy Valentín Acevedo

Member of the Puerto Rico Senate from the at-large district
- In office 1993–1996

Personal details
- Born: Mayagüez, Puerto Rico
- Party: New Progressive Party
- Profession: Politician, Senator

Freddy Valentín Acevedo was a Senator from 1993 to 1996 and head of the National Republican Party of Puerto Rico, as well as a member of the conservative New Progressive Party which advocates statehood for Puerto Rico.

== Biography ==
Freddy Valentín Acevedo was elected to the Senate of Puerto Rico at the 1992 general elections. During that term, he presided the Commission of Nominations of the Senate. Héctor Martínez Maldonado worked as his aide in the Senate during that time. Martínez would later testify having received cash and checks from contractors on behalf of Valentín.

Valentín lost a special election in 1999. In 2000, he was arrested at the Luis Muñoz Marín International Airport when he was returning from a trip to Argentina. A Grand Jury indicted him on 44 charges of fraud, extortion, and money laundering. In the process, he testified against contractor José Cobián Guzmán, and former Speaker of the House Edison Misla Aldarondo in another federal case against them in 2002. Valentín declared himself guilty on February 4, 2004, of some of the charges against him. However, because of his cooperation in the cases against Cobián and Misla Aldarondo, Valentín received only 18 months of sentence, and six years on probation.

Valentín has also been linked to an incident on January 11, 1975, at the Mayagüez plaza, where two young men were killed during an activity of supporters of the independence movement to celebrate the birth of Eugenio María de Hostos.
