= Carlos Díaz (Puerto Rican politician) =

Puerto Rican politician

Member of the Puerto Rico Senate from the San Juan district
- In office January 2, 2005 – January 1, 2009

Member of the Puerto Rico House of Representatives from the 5th District
- In office 1996–2000
- Preceded by: Myrna Passalacqua
- Succeeded by: Roberto "Junior" Maldonado

Personal details
- Born: Carlos Alberto Díaz Sánchez; February 6, 1970 (age 56) San Juan, Puerto Rico
- Party: New Progressive Party (1995–2022); Popular Democratic Party (2023–present)
- Children: Andrea Nicole; Diego Alejandro; Amaia Isabella
- Education: Brigham Young University
- Profession: Politician

Carlos Alberto Díaz Sánchez (Note: In this name that follows Hispanic American naming customs, the first or paternal surname is Díaz and the second or maternal family name is Sánchez.) (born February 6, 1970) is a Puerto Rican politician who has served in both the Puerto Rico House of Representatives and the Senate.

== Personal life ==
Carlos Díaz Sánchez was born on February 6, 1970, in San Juan, Puerto Rico. He was raised by single mother Lydia Sánchez Bermúdez, along with her sister Ann Lee, at Las Gladiolas Housing Project in Hato Rey. He studied at Brigham Young University in Utah. As a practicing Mormon, Díaz did missionary work in Guatemala in 1992.

== Political career ==
=== Representative: 1996–2000 ===
Upon his return to Puerto Rico, Díaz was elected to fill a vacancy at the Puerto Rico House of Representatives for District 5. In the 1996 general elections, he was officially elected as a Representative for the same district. At the age of 25 he was the youngest legislator in Puerto Rico's history. He ran again at the 2000 general election, but lost to the candidate of the opposing party.

=== Senator: 2004–2008 ===
Díaz returned to the political stage in 2004, when he presented his candidacy to the Senate of Puerto Rico, representing the District of San Juan. In the 2004 general elections, he was elected as one of San Juan's two district senators, along with running-mate Roberto Arango. As a New Progressive Party (NPP) senator, Díaz presided two standing committees and one select committee of the Senate.

Díaz was one of six members of the PNP party who chose not to support the recently defeated governor candidate, Pedro Rosselló, in his attempt to overtake the Senate's presidency from elected Senator Kenneth McClintock. For their loyalty, they became known as "Los Auténticos", which caused them to be expelled from the party. In 2008, the court agreed that Díaz and the other senators had been expelled from the party illegally and they were to be reinstated to their full capacity, as District Presidents, Delegates to the party or any other function they had inside the party. The decision also established that they could run for reelection for their party.

However, before his expulsion, Díaz became the center of a political scandal, when surveillance cameras of the Capitol of Puerto Rico were misused to record him. In the recording, Díaz was accompanying two ladies to the parking lot and, as they entered their car, Díaz kissed one of them on her hands and face. The video (which came to be known as Video 59) was later used to blackmail Díaz into supporting Rosselló in his power struggle with McClintock. It was later revealed that the two ladies were employees of the Senate that were asking Díaz for economic help for a chemotherapy treatment. A commission was created within the Senate to investigate the incident, but no actions were taken against the ones who ordered the recording of it.

In March 2008, Díaz was defeated for re-election as San Juan district Senator in the primaries of his party.

== Recent years ==
In 2009, Díaz was one of the possible candidates to fill the vacancy left by former senator Jorge de Castro Font, who resigned to his chair after being convicted by federal authorities. Díaz, however, declined the possibility. He partially retired from the political arena and is currently working in the private sector as an adviser on medical and hospital services.

In 2010, Secretary of Justice Guillermo Somoza recommended an investigation on Díaz, claiming there was evidence on bribery and corruption. In December of that year, the Special Independent Prosecutor assigned to the case decided there was insufficient evidence of the allegations and did not press charges against the former senator.

In March 2011, Díaz said in an interview that he would consider returning to politics. He also said that he could do it under the Popular Democratic Party stating that it was irrelevant because "the people are tired of parties... they want unity". Later that year, it was announced that Díaz was serving as adviser to thoracic surgeon Dr. Iván González Cancel, who was aspiring to run against Governor Foretuño in NPP primaries for Governor of Puerto Rico, before his candidacy was decertified by the NPP Directorate, a decision that has been appealed in federal district court. Díaz ran in the NPP March 16, 2012, primaries for state representative in San Juan's House district 4.

In October 2023, Díaz Sánchez returned to the political scene by officially joining in the Partido Popular Democrático de Puerto Rico, in which he ran for senator by accumulation.

In March 2024, Carlos Díaz Sánchez referred Puerto Rico Governor Pedro Pierluisi to the Office of Inspector General (OIG) of the United States Department of Education for an alleged political campaign financing scheme with public funds from education money in Puerto Rico.
