= Sixto Hernández Serrano =

Puerto Rican politician

Member of the Puerto Rico Senate from the Humacao district
- In office January 2, 2001 – August 12, 2006

Judge of the Puerto Rico Court of Appeals
- In office 2006–2021
- Appointed by: Aníbal Acevedo Vilá

Personal details
- Born: April 6 San Lorenzo, Puerto Rico
- Party: Popular Democratic Party
- Education: University of Puerto Rico at Humacao (B.Acy); Interamerican University of Puerto Rico School of Law (JD)
- Profession: Politician, Senator

Military service
- Allegiance: United States
- Branch/service: United States Army
- Years of service: 1968-1970
- Battles/wars: Vietnam War

Sixto Hernández Serrano (born April 6 in San Lorenzo, Puerto Rico) is a Puerto Rican politician, attorney, accountant, judge, and former senator. He was a member of the Senate of Puerto Rico since his first election in 2000. He resigned in 2006 after being appointed to be an appeals judge. He represented the Popular Democratic Party (PPD).

== Early years and studies ==
Sixto Hernández Serrano was born on April 6 in San Lorenzo, Puerto Rico. He completed high school at José Campeche High School in his hometown, graduating in 1966. From 1968 to 1970, he served for the United States Army, spending one year in Vietnam.

In 1970, he enrolls in the University of Puerto Rico at Humacao. He received his bachelor's degree in accounting in 1974. Later, he completed his Juris Doctor at the Interamerican University of Puerto Rico School of Law, and received his licence as a CPA. He is also licensed in real estate and is a member of the Puerto Rico Bar Association and the College of Certified Public Accountants.

== Professional career ==
After completing his bachelor's degree, Hernández worked as a tax auditor for the Puerto Rico Treasury Department at the District of Humacao. Later, he opened his own office in Juncos, where he performed both accounting and attorney duties.

== Political career ==
Hernández was elected to the Senate of Puerto Rico for the first time in 2000 general elections, representing the District of Humacao, along with José Luis Dalmau. They were both reelected in 2004. During that term, Hernández served as Speaker for his party in several commissions.

== Appointed as judge ==
In 2006, Hernández was appointed by Governor Aníbal Acevedo Vilá as an appeals judge. Hernández resigned to the Senate, effective on August 12, 2006. His vacancy in the Senate was filed by Jorge Suárez Cáceres. Served in the Puerto Rico Court of Appeals until his term expired in 2021
