= Héctor Martínez Maldonado =

Puerto Rican politician

Member of the Puerto Rico Senate from the at-large district
- In office 2019–2020

Member of the Puerto Rico Senate from the Carolina district
- In office January 2, 2005 – March 12, 2011

Personal details
- Born: September 1, 1968 (age 58) Canóvanas, Puerto Rico
- Party: New Progressive Party
- Education: Universidad del Sagrado Corazón; Interamerican University of Puerto Rico School of Law (JD)
- Profession: Politician, Attorney

Héctor Javier Martínez Maldonado (born September 1, 1968) is a former Puerto Rican politician, attorney and former senator of Puerto Rico. He served as senator of the District of Carolina from 2004 until 2011. Martínez was convicted of bribery by a federal jury on March 8, 2011 and is involve in William's situation helping the federal government because he served and apparently is making a deal with the federal government. after he resigned his seat on March 12, 2011.

== Early years and studies ==
Martínez was born on September 1, 1968. He is the youngest of five children from former Senator and Representative Héctor Martínez Colón and his wife, Persi Maldonado. He later received his juris doctor degree from the Interamerican University School of Law.

During his time in college, Martínez represented Puerto Rico in several international competitions of swimming and water polo.

== Political career ==
Martínez started his professional career working for a Judicial Commission of the Puerto Rico House of Representatives. He then worked as Special Aide to the Commission of Natural Resources, Environmental and Energy Affairs of the Senate of Puerto Rico. In 1996, he became an Associate Member of the Parole Board, becoming its Vicepresident in 2000. Martínez also worked as Freddy Valentín's aide in the Senate during the 90s. During that time, he admits having received checks and money from contractors on behalf of Valentín.

Martínez was elected as senator for the Senatorial District of Carolina in the 2004 general elections. As a result, he was named chair of the Senate's Public Safety Commission.

Martínez was reelected in 2008 after winning the primaries of his party.

== Legal troubles ==
In 2006, Martínez gained notoriety when he was linked to purported Puerto Rican drug dealer José López Rosario, also known as Coquito. López was shot in July 2006 by a rival dealer, and was in coma for six days. During that time, Senators Martínez and Lornna Soto, and Representative Epifanio Jiménez either visited López, or called to check in his status. It was later revealed that López was part of Martínez entourage, and had visited prisons with him as part of the Public Safety Commission.

On June 22, 2010, a Federal Grand Jury indicted Héctor Martínez and businessman Juan Bravo on six charges of conspiracy, bribery, and obstruction of justice, among others. Martínez alleged he was innocent and received the support of several leaders of his party, namely President of the Senate Thomas Rivera Schatz, Mayor of Canovanas Jose Chemo Soto, fellow Carolina senator Lornna Soto, and representative Eric Correa. Fellow Senators Carmelo Ríos Santiago, Norma Burgos, and Evelyn Vázquez were also present.

The trial against Martínez began in February 2011 and, after two weeks of deliberation, a jury found Martínez and Bravo guilty. Governor Luis Fortuño asked for Martínez resignation that night. Martínez complied on March 12, 2011, albeit maintaining his innocence. Martínez was sentenced to 4 years in prison on March 1, 2012. The sentence also included three additional years probation, attending a drug addiction rehabilitation program, and returning $17,500.

== Personal life ==
Martínez had a brief relationship with fellow senator Sila María González Calderón.
