= Danny López Soto =

Puerto Rican politician

Member of the Puerto Rico Senate from the Carolina district
- In office 1976–1984

Member of the Puerto Rico House of Representatives from the 2nd District
- In office 1969–1976
- Preceded by: Ernesto Gandía
- Succeeded by: Jaime Rosario Báez

Personal details
- Born: March 13, 1944 Utuado, Puerto Rico
- Died: August 16, 2011 (aged 67) San Juan, Puerto Rico
- Party: New Progressive Party (PNP)
- Spouse: Merilyn Pujals
- Children: Danny; Merilyn; Alvin
- Education: University of Puerto Rico School of Law (JD)
- Profession: Politician, Senator, Judge

Danny López Soto (1944 – August 16, 2011) was a legislator in Puerto Rico.

Born in Utuado in 1944 to Pablo López and Mariana Soto. His family moved to the Villa Palmeras neighborhood of San Juan in 1950. After studying high school at Luis Llorens Torres and República de Perú High Schools, he obtained his undergraduate and law degrees from the University of Puerto Rico School of Law. He married Merilyn Pujals in the mid-1960s.

A pro-statehood activist since an early age, in the 1960s he rebelled against the leadership of Statehood Republican Party of Puerto Rico president Miguel A. García Méndez and, in 1967, helped found the New Progressive Party or New Party for Progress (NPP), which would win the governorship and control of the Puerto Rico House of Representatives in 1968. He served as a member of that legislative body from 1969 to 1976. From 1977 to 1984 he served as a member of the Senate of Puerto Rico from 1977 to 1984. After his service at the senate he was appointed district attorney by governor Rafael Hernández Colón and in 1994 was named Superior Judge by gobernor Pedro Rosselló.

López Soto died in San Juan on August 16, 2011, at 67 years of age after a long illness.

Senate of Puerto Rico
Preceded by Celeste Benítez	Minority Whip of the Puerto Rico Senate; 1981	Succeeded by Mercedes Torres Torres
