= Jorge Alberto Ramos Vélez =

Puerto Rican politician

Member of the Puerto Rico Senate from the Mayagüez district
- In office 2001–2004

Personal details
- Born: December 30, 1970 (age 55) San Germán, Puerto Rico
- Party: Popular Democratic Party
- Education: Pontifical Catholic University of Puerto Rico (MPA)
- Profession: Politician, Senator

Jorge Alberto Ramos Vélez (born December 1, 1970) is a Puerto Rican politician and former senator. He was a member of the Senate of Puerto Rico from 2001 to 2004 representing the Popular Democratic Party (PPD).

Ramos Vélez is the son of politician Jorge Alberto Ramos Comas and Minerva Vélez Jusino. Has a Master of Arts (M.A.) in Public Administration from the Pontifical Catholic University of Puerto Rico.

Ramos Vélez was elected to the Senate of Puerto Rico representing the District of Mayagüez at the 2000 general elections.
