= Rafael Rodríguez Vargas =

Puerto Rican politician

Member of the Puerto Rico Senate from the Arecibo district
- In office 2001–2004

Personal details
- Born: Camuy, Puerto Rico
- Party: Popular Democratic Party
- Education: University of Puerto Rico at Mayagüez (BEng); Universidad Metropolitana (MBA); Center for Advanced Studies on Puerto Rico and the Caribbean (PhD)
- Profession: Politician, Senator

Rafael Rodríguez Vargas is a Puerto Rican politician and former senator. He was a member of the Senate of Puerto Rico from 2001 to 2004 representing the Popular Democratic Party (PPD).

He obtained a degree in Industrial Engineering (BSIE) from the University of Puerto Rico at Mayagüez, a master's degree in International Trade (MBA) Suma Laude from the Metropolitan University of Puerto Rico, and a Ph.D. in Philosophy and Letters with a concentration in History of Puerto Rico and the Caribbean (PhD) from the Center for Advanced Studies of Puerto Rico and the Caribbean.

Rodríguez first ran for senator at the 1996 general elections but lost to the candidates of the New Progressive Party. He ran again at the 2000 general elections, winning a seat for the next four years.

At the 2004 general elections, Rodríguez lost to the candidates of the PNP. Rodríguez tried to win a slot for the 2012 general elections, but arrived in fifth place at the PPD primaries earlier that year.
