= Héctor Martínez Colón =

Puerto Rican politician

Member of the Puerto Rico Senate from the Ponce district
- In office 1969–1973

Member of the Puerto Rico House of Representatives from the 24th District
- In office 1976–1984
- Preceded by: Orlando Velázquez Iglesias
- Succeeded by: José Luciano Hernández

Personal details
- Born: March 27, 1929 Ponce, Puerto Rico
- Died: April 16, 1991 (aged 62) Ponce, Puerto Rico
- Party: New Progressive Party
- Education: University of Puerto Rico (BA); University of Puerto Rico School of Law (JD)
- Profession: Politician

Héctor Martínez Colón was a Puerto Rican politician. He served as member of the Senate of Puerto Rico for the District of Ponce from 1969 to 1973. Martínez also served as part of the Puerto Rico House of Representatives.

== Background ==
Martínez entered the University of Puerto Rico, where he graduated with honors with a Bachelor of Arts degree, concentrating in Economics and Psychology. He then continued advanced studies until he graduated as a lawyer from the University of Puerto Rico School of Law. He established his legal practice in Ponce. He was married to Persi Maldonado. They have five children together. The youngest, Héctor Martínez Maldonado, served as senator also, from 2005 to 2011 when he was convicted for several charges of corruption.

== Death ==
Martínez Colón died on April 16, 1991, in Ponce, after battling cancer that had afflicted him since 1980.
