= 2000 Puerto Rican general election =

- November 7, 2000
- Gubernatorial election
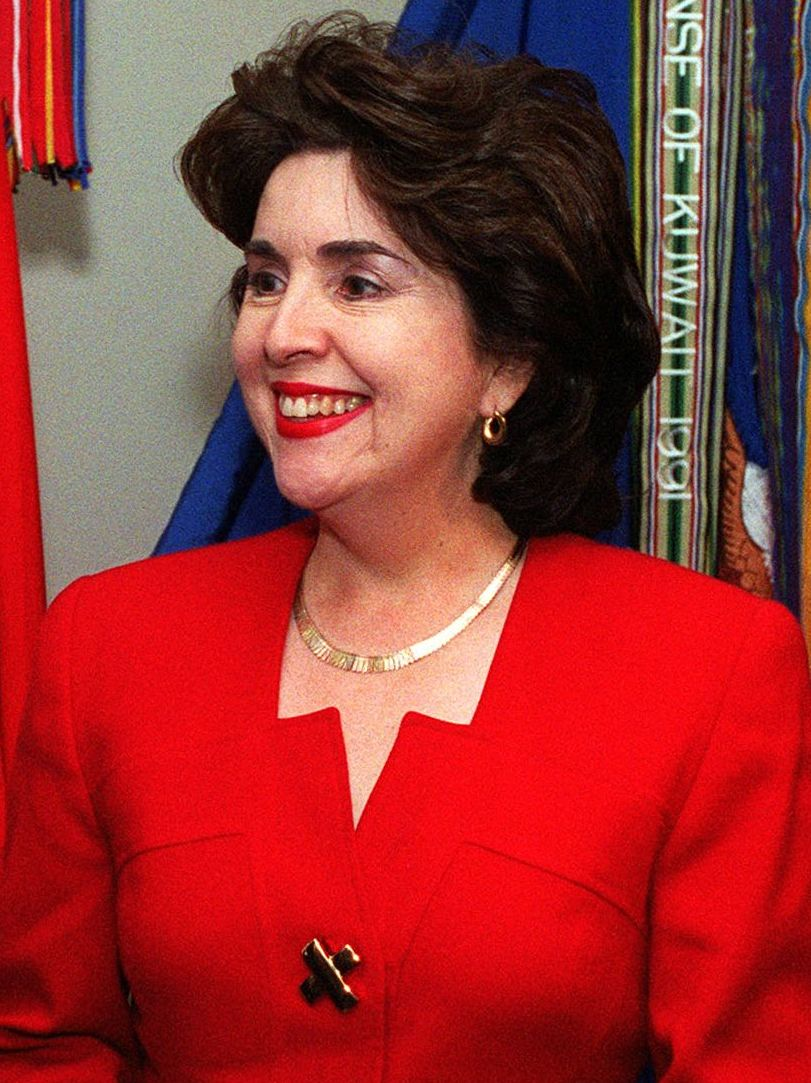

Nominee	Sila María Calderón	Carlos Pesquera	Rubén Berríos
Party	Popular Democratic	New Progressive	Independence
Popular vote	978,860	919,194	104,705
Percentage	48.86%	45.88%	5.23%
- Results by municipality Calderón: 40–50% 50–60% Pesquera: 40–50% 50–60%
Governor before election
Pedro Rosselló
New Progressive
Elected Governor
Sila María Calderón
Popular Democratic
- Resident Commissioner election
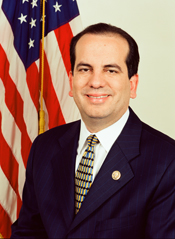

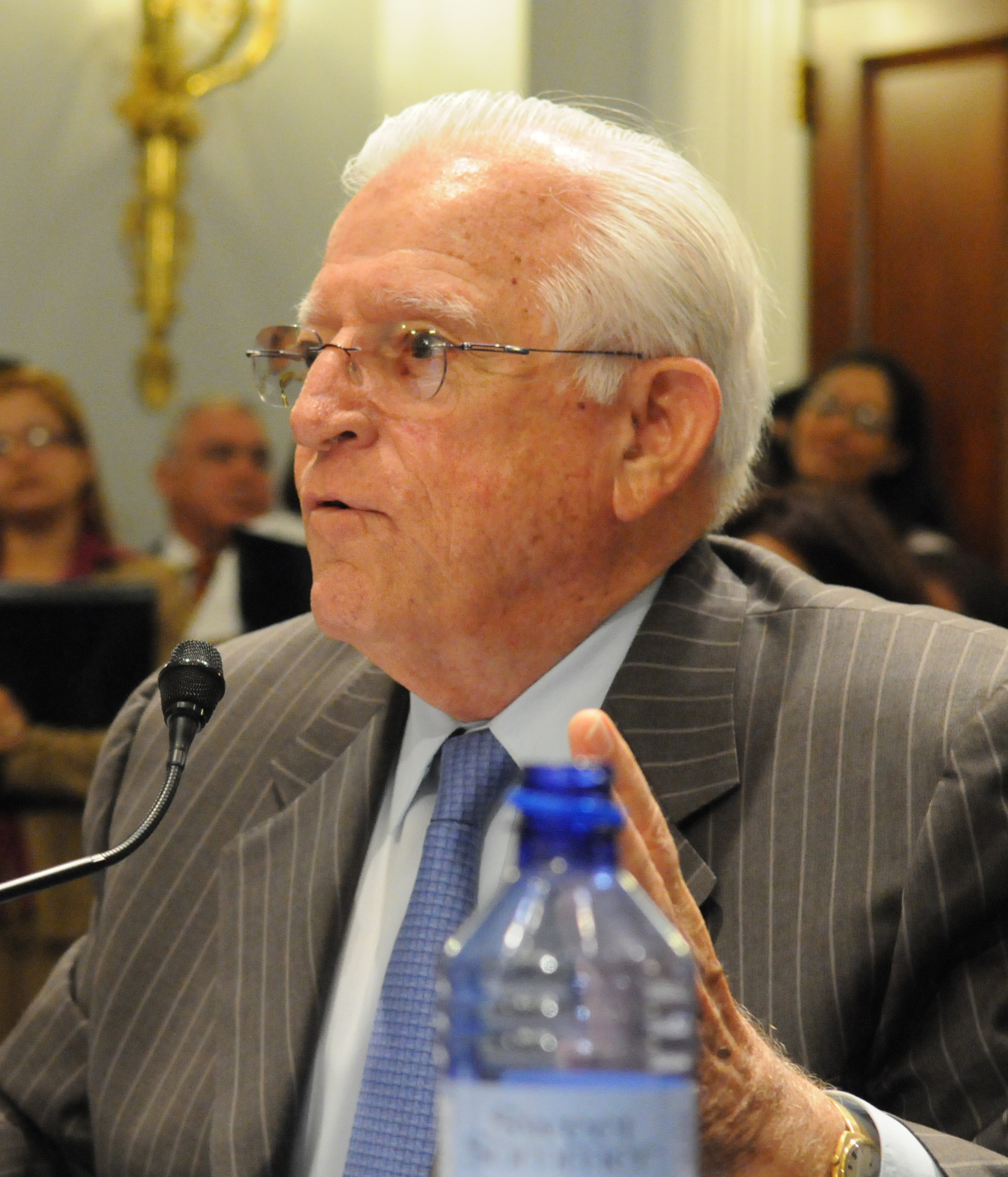
Nominee	Aníbal Acevedo Vilá	Carlos Romero Barcelo
Party	Popular Democratic	New Progressive
Alliance	Democratic	Democratic
Popular vote	983,488	905,960
Percentage	49.55%	45.63%
- Results by municipality Acevedo Vilá: 40–50% 50–60% Barceló: 40–50% 50–60%

General elections were held in Puerto Rico on November 7, 2000. Sila María Calderón of the Popular Democratic Party (PPD) was elected Governor, becoming the first woman to be elected for that office, whilst the PPD also won a majority of seats in the House of Representatives and the Senate. Voter turnout was between 80% and 82%.

== Results ==
=== Governor ===
Candidate	Party	Votes	%
Sila María Calderón	Popular Democratic Party	978,860	48.86
Carlos Pesquera	New Progressive Party	919,194	45.88
Rubén Berríos Martínez	Puerto Rican Independence Party	104,705	5.23
Other candidates		709	0.04
Total		2,003,468	100.00
Valid votes		2,003,468	99.57
Invalid/blank votes		8,667	0.43
Total votes		2,012,135	100.00
Registered voters/turnout		2,447,032	82.23
Source: Nohlen

=== Resident Commissioner ===
Candidate	Party	Votes	%
Aníbal Acevedo Vilá	Popular Democratic Party	983,488	49.55
Carlos Romero Barcelo	New Progressive Party	905,690	45.63
Manuel Rodríguez Orellana	Puerto Rican Independence Party	95,067	4.79
Other candidates		571	0.03
Total		1,984,816	100.00
Valid votes		1,984,816	99.57
Invalid/blank votes		8,667	0.43
Total votes		1,993,483	100.00
Registered voters/turnout		2,447,032	81.47
Source: Nohlen

=== House of Representatives ===
Party	At-large			District			Total seats	+/–
Party	Votes	%	Seats	Votes	%	Seats	Total seats	+/–
Popular Democratic Party	857,614	44.34	5	934,611	47.90	25	30	14
New Progressive Party	851,506	44.02	5	902,708	46.26	15	20	–17
Puerto Rican Independence Party	224,765	11.62	1	112,592	5.77	0	1	0
Other parties	274	0.01	0	1,414	0.07	0	0	0
Total	1,934,159	100.00	11	1,951,325	100.00	40	51	0
Valid votes	1,934,159	99.03		1,951,325	99.04			
Invalid/blank votes	18,962	0.97		18,962	0.96			
Total votes	1,953,121	100.00		1,970,287	100.00			
Registered voters/turnout	2,447,032	79.82		2,447,032	80.52			
Source: Nohlen, Puerto Rico Election Archive, Puerto Rico Election Archive

=== Senate ===
Party	At-large			District			Total seats	+/–
Party	Votes	%	Seats	Votes	%	Seats	Total seats	+/–
Popular Democratic Party	855,013	44.31	5	1,850,091	48.05	14	19	+11
New Progressive Party	856,886	44.41	6	1,778,197	46.18	2	8	–11
Puerto Rican Independence Party	217,390	11.27	1	221,411	5.75	0	1	0
Other parties	142	0.01	0	676	0.02	0	0	–
Total	1,929,431	100.00	12	3,850,375	100.00	16	28	0
Valid votes	1,929,431	99.03						
Invalid/blank votes	18,962	0.97						
Total votes	1,948,393	100.00						
Registered voters/turnout	2,447,032	79.62						
Source: Nohlen, Puerto Rico Election Archive
