= Party leaders of the Senate of Puerto Rico =

List of Puerto Rico's Senators

Majority Leader of the Senate of Puerto Rico PNP Leader
- Incumbent; Gregorio Matías Rosario since January 2, 2025
- Style: Senator

Minority Leader of the Senate of Puerto Rico PPD Leader
- Incumbent; Luis Javier Hernández Ortiz since January 2, 2025
- Style: Senator

Minority Leader of the Senate of Puerto Rico PIP Leader
- Incumbent; María de Lourdes Santiago Negrón since January 2, 2025
- Style: Senator

Minority Leader of the Senate of Puerto Rico PD Leader
- Incumbent; Joanne Rodríguez Veve since January 2, 2025
- Style: Senator

Minority Leader of the Senate of Puerto Rico Independent Leader
- Incumbent; Eliezer Molina Pérez since January 2, 2025
- Style: Senator

The Senate of Puerto Rico majority and minority leaders are Puerto Rican Senators who are elected by the party conferences that hold the majority and the minorities respectively. These leaders serve as the chief Senate spokespeople for their parties and manage and schedule the legislative and executive business of the Senate. By rule, the Presiding Officer gives the Majority Leader priority in obtaining recognition to speak on the floor of the Senate. The Majority Leader customarily serves as the chief representative of their party in Senate.

== Current floor leaders ==
The Senate is currently composed of 18 senators from the New Progressive Party (PNP), 5 senators from the Popular Democratic Party (PPD), 2 senators from Puerto Rican Independence Party (PIP), 1 senator of Proyecto Dignidad (PD) and 1 independent senator.

The incumbent floor leaders are PNP Majority Leader Gregorio Matías Rosario, PPD Minority Leader Luis Javier Hernández Ortiz.

== List of party leaders ==
The "Majority" column indicates which party was the majority in the Senate, while the opposing column indicates the minority. The PIP, MVC, and PD are usually a minority.

Senate	Dates	PNP Leader	Majority	PPD Leader	PIP Leader	Independent	MVC Leader	PD Leader
1st	1949–1953		PPD Maj →	Víctor Gutiérrez Franqui	N/A			
2nd	1953–1957	Miguel Angel García Méndez	PPD Maj →		Gilberto Concepción de Gracia (at-large)			
3rd	1957–1961	Miguel Angel García Méndez	PPD Maj →	Luis Negrón López	N/A			
4th	1961–1965		PPD Maj →		N/A			
5th	1965–1969		PPD Maj →	Luis Negrón López	N/A			
6th	1969–1973	Justo A. Méndez Rodriguez (at-large)	PPD Maj →	Hipólito Marcano (at-large)	N/A			
7th	1973–1977	José Menéndez Monroig (at-large)	PPD Maj →		Rubén Berríos (at-large)			
8th	1977–1981	Nicolás Nogueras (at-large)	← PNP Maj	Miguel Hernández Agosto (at-large)	N/A			
9th	1981–1985	Nicolás Nogueras (at-large)	PPD Maj →	Gilberto Rivera Ortiz (Humacao)	N/A			
10th	1985–1989	Roberto Rexach Benítez (at-large)	PPD Maj →	Gilberto Rivera Ortiz (Humacao)	Rubén Berríos (at-large)			
11th	1989–1993	Roberto Rexach Benítez (at-large)	PPD Maj →	Gilberto Rivera Ortiz (Humacao)	Fernando Martín García (at-large)			
12th	1993–1997	Charlie Rodríguez (at-large)	← PNP Maj	Miguel Hernández Agosto (at-large)	Rubén Berríos (at-large)			
13th	1997–2001	José Enrique Meléndez (Guayama)	← PNP Maj	Antonio Fas Alzamora (at-large)	Rubén Berríos (at-large)			
14th	2001–2005	Kenneth McClintock (at-large)	PPD Maj →	José Luis Dalmau (Humacao)	Fernando Martín (at-large)			
15th	2005	Jorge de Castro Font (at-large)	← PNP Maj	José Luis Dalmau (Humacao)	María de Lourdes Santiago (at-large)			
15th	2005–2009	Margarita Nolasco (Guayama)	← PNP Maj	José Luis Dalmau (Humacao)	María de Lourdes Santiago (at-large)			
16th	2009–2011	Roberto Arango (San Juan)	← PNP Maj	José Luis Dalmau (Humacao)	N/A			
16th	2011-2013	Larry Seilhamer (Ponce)	← PNP Maj	José Luis Dalmau (Humacao)	N/A			
17th	2013–2017	Larry Seilhamer (at-large)	PPD Maj →	Aníbal José Torres (at-large)	María de Lourdes Santiago (at-large)			
18th	2017–2021	Carmelo Ríos (Bayamón)	← PNP Maj	Eduardo Bhatia (at-large)	Juan Dalmau (at-large)	José Vargas Vidot (at-large)		
19th	2021-2025	Thomas Rivera Schatz (at-large)	PPD Maj →	Javier Aponte Dalmau (Carolina)	María de Lourdes Santiago (at-large)	José Vargas Vidot (at-large)	Ana Irma Rivera Lassén (at-large)	Joanne Rodríguez Veve (at-large)
20th	2025-present	Gregorio Matías Rosarioz (at-large)	← PNP Maj	Luis Javier Hernández Ortiz (at-large)	María de Lourdes Santiago (at-large)	Eliezer Molina Pérez (at-large)	N/A	Joanne Rodríguez Veve (at-large)
Senate	Dates	PNP Leader	Majority	PPD Leader	PIP Leader	Independent	MVC Leader	PD Leader

== See also ==
- Assistant party leaders of the Senate of Puerto Rico
