= José Luis Dalmau =

Puerto Rican politician (born 1966)

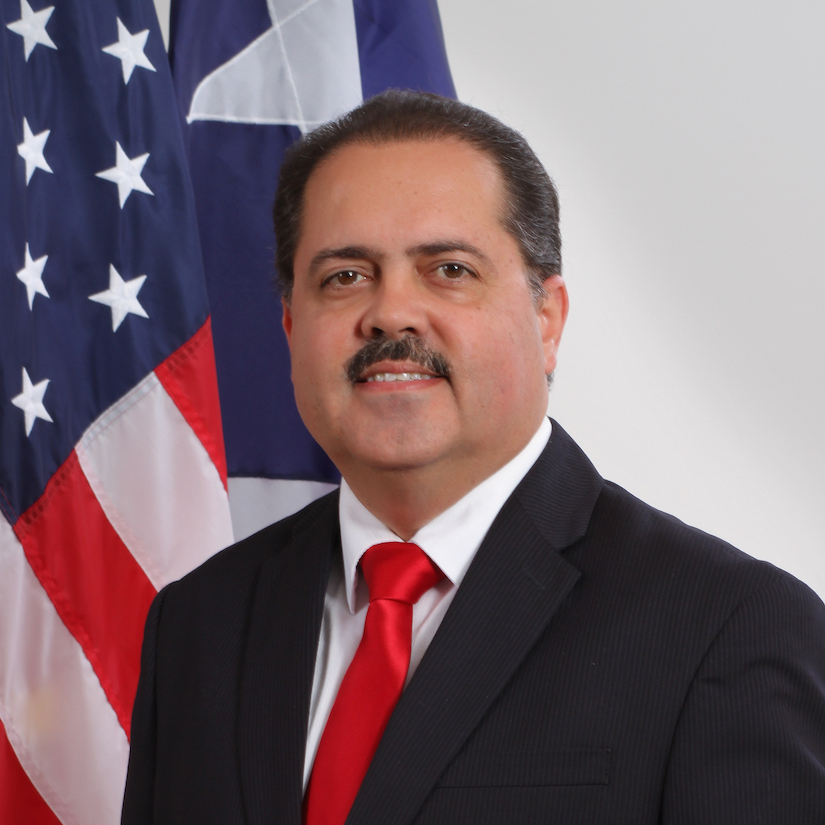

17th President of the Puerto Rico Senate
- In office January 11, 2021 – December 31, 2024
- Preceded by: Thomas Rivera Schatz
- Succeeded by: Thomas Rivera Schatz

Chair of the Puerto Rico Popular Democratic Party
- In office February 23, 2021 – June 14, 2023
- Preceded by: Carlos Delgado Altieri
- Succeeded by: Jesús Manuel Ortiz

22nd President pro tempore of the Puerto Rico Senate
- In office January 2, 2013 – January 2, 2017
- Preceded by: Margarita Nolasco
- Succeeded by: Larry Seilhamer

Minority Leader of the Puerto Rico Senate
- In office January 2, 2005 – January 2, 2013
- Preceded by: Kenneth McClintock
- Succeeded by: Larry Seilhamer

Majority Leader of the Puerto Rico Senate
- In office January 2, 2001 – January 2, 2005
- Preceded by: Quique Meléndez
- Succeeded by: Jorge de Castro Font

Member of the Puerto Rico Senate from the at-large district
- Incumbent
- Assumed office January 2021
- In office January 2009 – January 2013

Member of the Puerto Rico Senate from the Humacao district
- In office January 2013 – January 2021
- In office January 2001 – January 2009

Personal details
- Born: José Luis Dalmau Santiago; September 19, 1966 (age 59) Caguas, Puerto Rico
- Party: Popular Democratic
- Spouse: Margie Rosario Lugo
- Children: José Luis & José Juan
- Education: University of Puerto Rico (BA); Eugenio María de Hostos School of Law (JD)

José Luis Dalmau Santiago (born September 19, 1966) is an attorney and politician. He was the 17th president of the Senate of Puerto Rico and President of the Popular Democratic Party of Puerto Rico.

== Early years and studies ==
Dalmau was born on September 19, 1966, in Caguas, Puerto Rico, to José Luis Dalmau Rodríguez and Diana Iris Santiago Casanova. He attended elementary through high school at Colegio Católico Notre Dame in Caguas, graduating in 1984. He holds a Bachelor's degree in Natural Science with a Major in Biology from the University of Puerto Rico in Río Piedras. In 1997, he received his Juris Doctor from the Facultad de Derecho Eugenio Maria de Hostos.

== Political career ==
=== First years in politics ===
Dalmau began his political career as a teenager when he served as interim president of the Popular Youth in Caguas. After that, he worked for the campaigns of Mayors Angel O. Berríos and then Willie Miranda Marín, as well as the campaigns for the 1993 and 1994 referendums. He also served at the Electoral Colleges during various elections, 1988, 1992 and 1996, and served at the Electoral College during various referendums, 1991, 1993 and 1994.

From 1991 to 1992, Dalmau served as Special Aide to Speaker of the House José Ronaldo Jarabo, and then as an aide to Representative Juan Corujo Collazo. He also worked as legal counsel to the Office of Legal Affairs of the Municipality of Caguas and former deputy director of "Campamento de Orgullo Criollo" that was developed for young school dropouts in Caguas.

=== Senator: 2000-present ===
He was elected to the Senate of Puerto Rico on November 7, 2000, at the age of 34, representing the District of Humacao along with his running mate, Sixto Hernández. In 2001, he was selected unanimously by his fellow senators to the Senate Majority Leader during his freshman term under the twelfth President of the Senate, Antonio Fas Alzamora. During that term, he also presided the Committee of Rules and Calendar, as well as the Housing Committee and the Select Committee for the Legislative Reform.

On November 2, 2004, he was reelected to the Senate of Puerto Rico, representing the District of Humacao despite the Popular Democratic Party of Puerto Rico's defeat at the 2004 elections, and he was elected to the role of being the PPD Minority Leader of the PPD delegation. While a minority in the Senate, presided by the NPP's Kenneth D. McClintock, his delegation represented the executive branch's interests in that legislative body, after PPD gubernatorial candidate Aníbal Acevedo Vilá narrowly beat former Governor Pedro Rosselló after a hotly contested post-election court challenge.

In 2006, Dalmau's running mate, Hernández, was nominated by Gov. Acevedo Vilá and was easily confirmed by his fellow senators as an appeals judge. Hernández was replaced by Jorge Suárez Cáceres. Although both were defeated at the 2008 general elections, they gained seats as a result of the Minority Law in the Constitution of Puerto Rico. At the end of his term in 2012, he became the third senator to get elected for 3 consecutive terms as a party floor leader in the Senate, equaling the record with Luis Negrón López and Gilberto Rivera Ortiz. In addition, he became the fourth senator to be elected Floor Leader for 12 years, joining Ruben Berrios of the Puerto Rican Independence Party (PIP).

On November 6, 2012 he was elected to the Senate of Puerto Rico, representing again the District of Humacao, along with his running mate, Jorge Suárez Cáceres. In 2013, he became President Pro Tem of the Senate of Puerto Rico during his fourth term under the fifteenth President of the Senate, Eduardo Bhatia Gautier. During that term, he presided over the Committee of Health and Nutrition, as well as the Select Committee to investigate the implementation of the "Programa Comprensivo de Desarrollo Profesional para Certificación y Re-Certificación por Materia de Enseñanza" (CRECE-21).

On November 8, 2016 he was the only district candidate of the Popular Democratic Party of Puerto Rico elected to the Senate of Puerto Rico representing again the District of Humacao. In 2017, he became Minority Whip of the Senate of Puerto Rico. During that term, he presided over the Committee of Veterans Affairs, the first minority legislator appointed to chair a committee, a role previously reserved to majority party legislators.

In the 2020 general elections, Dalmau Santiago was reelected as a senator. His fellow senators then elected him to be the 17th president of Puerto Rico's Senate. By 2024, Dalmau will have served for 24 consecutive years in the Senate.

=== President PPD ===
On February 23, 2021, Dalmau Santiago was sworn in as president of the Popular Democratic Party of Puerto Rico (PPD).

== Personal life ==
José Luis Dalmau is married to Margie Rosario Lugo. They have two children together: José Luis and José Juan.

Several of Dalmau's relatives are also involved in politics. His cousin Juan Dalmau, is one of the leaders of the Puerto Rican Independence Party (PIP) and is elected in 2016 as senator at-large. Another cousin, Carlos Dalmau, was in charge of Acevedo Vilá's campaign. Another relative, Daly Dalmau, was married to former mayor of Carolina, José Aponte de la Torre. After Aponte's death, he was succeeded by Dalmau's cousin, José Aponte Dalmau. In 2012, his other cousin and brother of the mayor of Carolina, Javier Aponte Dalmau, was elected member of Puerto Rico House of Representative from 38th District, Carolina, Trujillo Alto and Canovanas. Also, Dalmau's brother, Ulises, competed in the 2008 and 2016 PPD Primaries to become representative at-large, but failed to be elected.

Senate of Puerto Rico
Preceded by Quique Meléndez	Majority Leader of the Puerto Rico Senate; 2001–2005	Succeeded by Jorge de Castro Font
Preceded by Kenneth McClintock	Minority Leader of the Puerto Rico Senate; 2005–2013	Succeeded by Larry Seilhamer
Preceded by Margarita Nolasco	President pro tempore of the Puerto Rico Senate; 2013–2017	Succeeded by Larry Seilhamer
Political offices
Preceded by Thomas Rivera Schatz	President of the Puerto Rico Senate; 2021–2025	Succeeded by Thomas Rivera Schatz
Party political offices
Preceded by Carlos Delgado Altieri	Chair of the Puerto Rico Popular Democratic Party; 2021–2023	Succeeded by Jesús Manuel Ortiz
