= Resident Commissioner of Puerto Rico =

Non-voting member of the United States House of Representatives

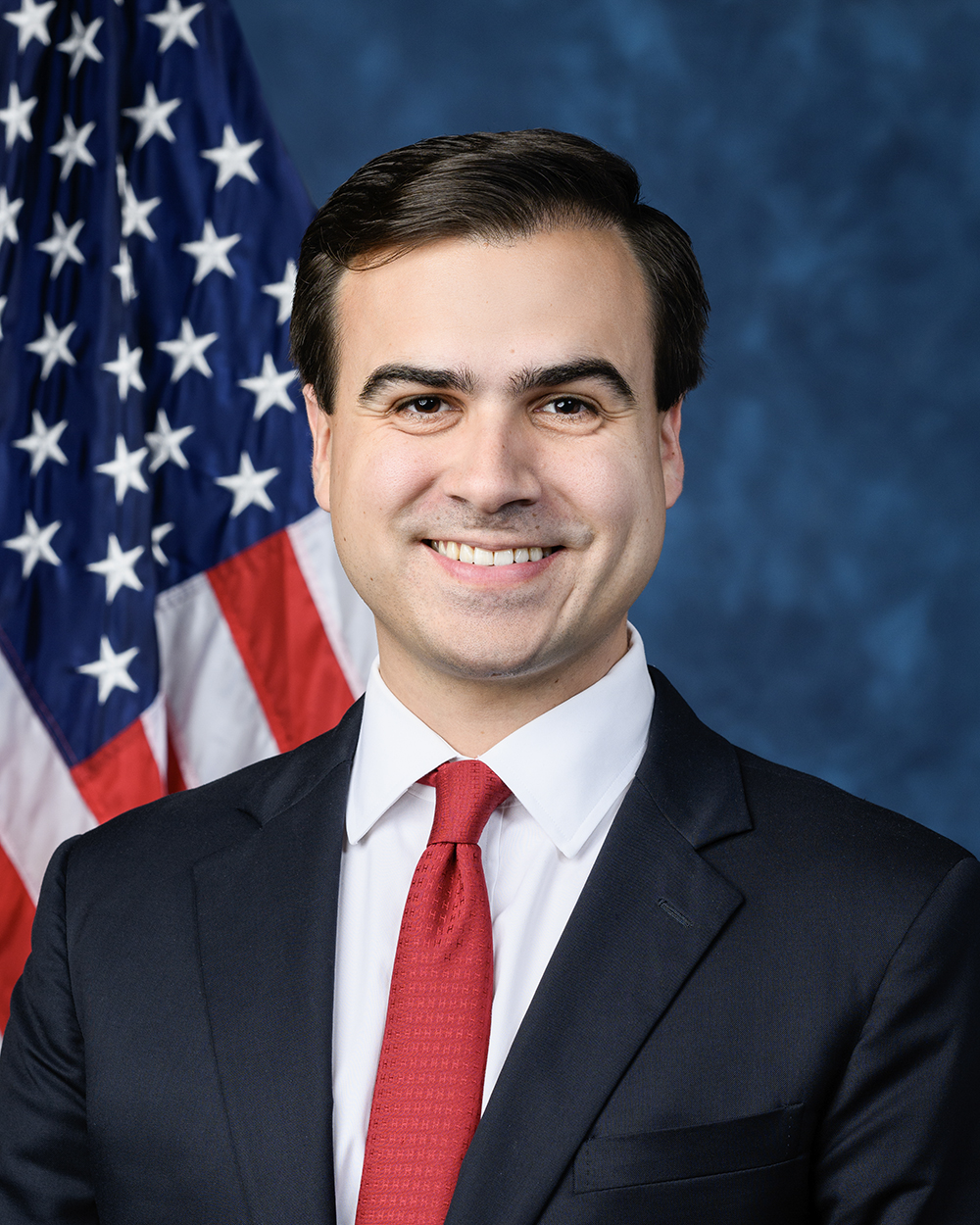
- Incumbent; Pablo José Hernández Rivera since January 3, 2025
- United States House of Representatives
- Seat: Puerto Rico
- Term length: Four years, renewable
- Formation: January 2, 1900
- First holder: Federico Degetau
- Salary: US$174,000

Puerto Rico's at-large congressional district
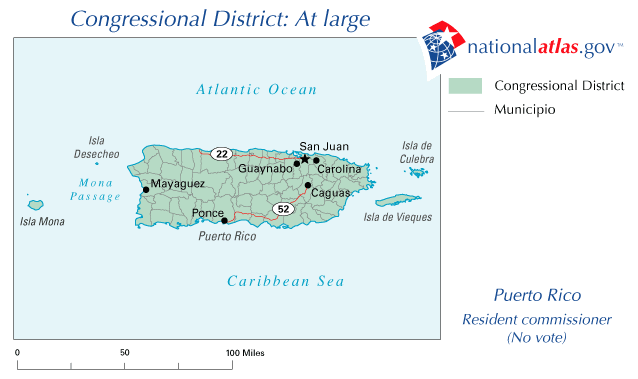
- Resident Commissioner: Pablo José Hernández Rivera (Note: Hernández Rivera caucuses with the Democratic Party.); D–San Juan
- Area: 3,515 mi^{2} (9,100 km^{2})
- Population (2019): 3,193,694
- Median household income: 14,412
- Ethnicity: 80.5% Hispanic; 8.5% Black; 6.8% White; 3.6% other; 0.4% Native American; 0.2% Asian
- Occupation: 67.9% White-collar; 20.5% Blue-collar; 11.6% Gray-collar

The resident commissioner of Puerto Rico (Spanish: Comisionado Residente de Puerto Rico) is a non-voting member of the United States House of Representatives elected by the voters of the U.S. Commonwealth of Puerto Rico every four years, the only member of the House of Representatives who serves a four-year term. Because the commissioner represents the entire territory of Puerto Rico irrespective of its population, and is not subject to congressional apportionment like those House members representing the 50 states, Puerto Rico's at-large congressional district is the largest congressional district by population in all of the United States.

Commissioners function in every respect as a member of Congress, including sponsoring legislation and serving on congressional committees, where they can vote on legislation, but they cannot vote on the final disposition of legislation on the House floor. They receive a salary of $174,000 per year and are identified as Member of Congress.

As of 2025 the commissioner is Pablo José Hernández Rivera of the Popular Democratic Party (PDP), the youngest person to hold the post. He is also affiliated with the Democratic Party (D) at the national level.

Other U.S. territories have a similar representative position called a delegate.

== History ==
The United States Congress had seated non-voting "delegates" from various territories since 1794 as the country expanded across North America; these territories were all eventually admitted as states. The position of delegate was a legislative position with a two-year term, just like a member of Congress.

The United States acquired several overseas possessions as a result of the Spanish–American War. While the House of Representatives voted in 1900 for Puerto Rico to select a delegate, Congress instead devised a new form of territorial representative in the resident commissioner. United States senator John Coit Spooner argued that granting a territory a delegate implied that it was on the path to statehood, which he asserted was not guaranteed for the new possessions acquired in the war, such as Puerto Rico and the Philippines. In fact, more than a century later, neither has become a state. (Puerto Rico remains a U.S. territory, while the Philippines became an independent republic in 1946.)

The original resident commissioner positions served a two-year term, though it was later extended to four years starting in 1920. The position also had executive responsibility in addition to legislative ones. The term had been used as to parts of the British Empire (see resident commissioner), but in an almost opposite sense; sent or recognized as the Crown's representative to manage a territory. In the American sense, resident commissioner always refers to a representative of a territory to the national government.

This representation has evolved over time. At first, the resident commissioner could not even be present on the floor of the House of Representatives; floor privileges were granted in 1902. In 1904, the officeholder gained the right to speak during debate and serve on the Committee on Insular Affairs, which had responsibility for the territories gained in the Spanish-American War.

In 1933, Resident Commissioner Santiago Iglesias was appointed to additional committees, and each of his successors has served on other committees also. But only in 1970 did the resident commissioner gain the right to vote in committees, gain seniority, or hold leadership positions.

The present-day resident commissioner, like the delegates from other territories and the District of Columbia, has almost all of the rights of other House members, including being able to sponsor bills and offer amendments and motions. Territorial representatives remain unable to vote on matters before the full House.

== Summary of resident commissioners of Puerto Rico ==
- 1901–1905: Federico Degetau
- 1905–1911: Tulio Larrínaga
- 1911–1916: Luis Muñoz Rivera
- 1916–1917: vacant
- 1917–1932: Félix Córdova Dávila
- 1932–1932: vacant
- 1932–1933: José Lorenzo Pesquera
- 1933–1939: Santiago Iglesias
- 1939–1939: vacant
- 1939–1945: Bolívar Pagán
- 1945–1946: Jesús T. Piñero
- 1946–1946: vacant
- 1946–1965: Antonio Fernós-Isern
- 1965–1969: Santiago Polanco Abreu
- 1969–1973: Jorge Luis Córdova
- 1973–1977: Jaime Benítez Rexach
- 1977–1985: Baltasar Corrada del Río
- 1985–1992: Jaime Fuster
- 1992–1993: Antonio Colorado
- 1993–2001: Carlos Romero Barceló
- 2001–2005: Aníbal Acevedo Vilá
- 2005–2009: Luis Fortuño
- 2009–2017: Pedro Pierluisi
- 2017–2025: Jenniffer González-Colón
- 2025–present: Pablo Hernández Rivera

== List of resident commissioners of Puerto Rico ==
=== Resident commissioners under U.S. colonial administration ===
No.	Resident Commissioner	Party	U.S. affiliation	Years	Congress	Electoral history
District established March 4, 1901
1	Federico Degetau y González (San Juan)	Republican	Republican	March 4, 1901 – March 3, 1905 3 years, 364 days	57th 58th	Elected in 1900. Re-elected in 1902. Retired.
2	Tulio Larrínaga (San Juan)	Unionist	[data missing]	March 4, 1905 – March 3, 1911 5 years, 364 days	59th 60th 61st	Elected in 1904. Re-elected in 1906. Re-elected in 1908. Retired.
3	Luis Muñoz Rivera (San Juan)	Unionist	[data missing]	March 4, 1911 – November 15, 1916 5 years, 256 days	62nd 63rd 64th	Elected in 1910. Re-elected in 1912. Re-elected in 1914. Re-elected in 1916. Died.
–	Vacant			November 16, 1916 – August 6, 1917	64th 65th	
4	Félix L. M. Córdova Dávila (San Juan)	Unionist	[data missing]	August 7, 1917 – April 11, 1932 14 years, 238 days	65th 66th 67th 68th 69th 70th 71st 72nd	Elected to finish Rivera's term. Re-elected in 1920. Re-elected in 1924. Re-elected in 1928. Resigned to become Justice of the Supreme Court of Puerto Rico.
–	Vacant			April 12, 1932 – April 14, 1932	72nd	
5	José Lorenzo Pesquera (Bayamon)	Independent	[data missing]	April 15, 1932 – March 3, 1933 322 days	72nd	Elected to finish Dávila's term. Retired.
6	Santiago Iglesias Pantín (San Juan)	Coalitionist	[data missing]	March 4, 1933 – December 5, 1939 6 years, 276 days	73rd 74th 75th 76th	Elected in 1932. Re-elected in 1936. Died.
–	Vacant			December 5, 1939 – December 26, 1939	76th	
7	Bolívar Pagán (San Juan)	Coalitionist	[data missing]	December 26, 1939 – January 3, 1945 5 years, 1 day	76th 77th 78th	Appointed to finish Iglesias Pantín's term. Elected in 1940. Retired.
8	Jesús T. Piñero Jiménez (Canovanas)	Popular Democratic	Democratic	January 3, 1945 – September 2, 1946 1 year, 242 days	79th	Elected in 1944. Resigned to become Governor of Puerto Rico.

=== Resident commissioners under the Constitution of the Commonwealth of Puerto Rico ===
Popular Democratic Party (7)
New Progressive Party (6)

U.S. party affiliation

Democratic Party (11)
Republican Party (2)

No.	Resident Commissioner	Party	Affiliation within U.S. politics	Years	Congress	Electoral history
9	Antonio Fernós-Isern (Santurce)	Popular Democratic	Democratic	September 11, 1946 – January 3, 1965 18 years, 23 days	79th 80th 81st 82nd 83rd 84th 85th 86th 87th 88th	Appointed to finish Piñero's term. Re-elected in 1948. Re-elected in 1952. Re-elected in 1956. Re-elected in 1960. Retired.
10	Santiago Polanco Abreu (Isabela)	Popular Democratic	Democratic	January 3, 1965 – January 3, 1969 4 years	89th 90th	Elected in 1964. Lost re-election.
11	Jorge Luis Córdova (San Juan)	New Progressive	Democratic	January 3, 1969 – January 3, 1973 4 years	91st 92nd	Elected in 1968. Lost re-election.
12	Jaime Benítez (Cayey)	Popular Democratic	Democratic	January 3, 1973 – January 3, 1977 4 years	93rd 94th	Elected in 1972. Lost re-election.
13	Baltasar Corrada del Río (Rio Piedras)	New Progressive	Democratic	January 3, 1977 – January 3, 1985 8 years	95th 96th 97th 98th	Elected in 1976. Re-elected in 1980. Retired to run for mayor of San Juan.
14	Jaime Fuster (Condado)	Popular Democratic	Democratic	January 3, 1985 – March 3, 1992 7 years, 60 days	99th 100th 101st 102nd	Elected in 1984. Re-elected in 1988. Resigned to become Justice of the Supreme Court of Puerto Rico.
15	Antonio Colorado (San Juan)	Popular Democratic	Democratic	March 4, 1992 – January 3, 1993 305 days	102nd	Appointed to finish Fuster's term. Lost election to full term.
16	Carlos Romero Barceló (San Juan)	New Progressive	Democratic	January 3, 1993 – January 3, 2001 8 years	103rd 104th 105th 106th	Elected in 1992. Re-elected in 1996. Lost re-election.
17	Aníbal Acevedo Vilá (Hato Rey)	Popular Democratic	Democratic	January 3, 2001 – January 3, 2005 4 years	107th 108th	Elected in 2000. Retired to run for Governor of Puerto Rico.
18	Luis Fortuño (Guaynabo)	New Progressive	Republican	January 3, 2005 – January 3, 2009 4 years	109th 110th	Elected in 2004. Retired to run for Governor of Puerto Rico.
19	Pedro Pierluisi (San Juan)	New Progressive	Democratic	January 3, 2009 – January 3, 2017 8 years	111th 112th 113th 114th	Elected in 2008. Re-elected in 2012. Retired to run for Governor of Puerto Rico.
20	Jenniffer González-Colón (Carolina)	New Progressive	Republican	January 3, 2017 – January 2, 2025 8 years	115th 116th 117th 118th	Elected in 2016. Re-elected in 2020. Retired to run for Governor of Puerto Rico.
21	Pablo Hernández Rivera (San Juan)	Popular Democratic	Democratic	January 3, 2025 – present	119th	Elected in 2024.

== Recent elections ==
=== 2000 ===
2000 Puerto Rico Resident Commissioner election
Party	Candidate	Votes	%
Popular Democratic	Aníbal Acevedo Vilá	983,488	49.34
New Progressive	Carlos Romero Barceló (incumbent)	905,690	45.43
Independence	Manuel Rodríguez Orellana	95,067	4.77
Write-in		9,238	0.46
Total votes		1,993,483	100.00
Popular Democratic gain from New Progressive			
Democratic hold			

=== 2004 ===
2004 Puerto Rico Resident Commissioner election
Party	Candidate	Votes	%
New Progressive	Luis Fortuño	956,828	48.83
Popular Democratic	Roberto Prats Palerm	945,691	48.26
Independence	Edwin Irizarry Mora	56,589	2.89
Write-in		445	0.02
Total votes		1,959,553	100.00
New Progressive gain from Popular Democratic			
Republican gain from Democratic			

=== 2008 ===
2008 Puerto Rico Resident Commissioner election
Party	Candidate	Votes	%
New Progressive	Pedro Pierluisi	996,997	52.70
Popular Democratic	Alfredo Salazar	799,746	42.27
Puerto Ricans for Puerto Rico	Carlos Velazquez	45,154	2.39
Independence	Jessica Martinez	37,129	1.96
Write-in		12,773	0.68
Total votes		1,891,799	100.00
New Progressive hold			
Democratic gain from Republican			

=== 2012 ===
2012 Puerto Rico Resident Commissioner election
Party	Candidate	Votes	%
New Progressive	Pedro Pierluisi (incumbent)	905,066	48.76
Popular Democratic	Rafael Cox Alomar	881,181	47.47
Independence	Juan Manuel Mercado	38,941	2.10
Working People's	Félix Córdova Iturregu	13,120	0.71
Sovereign Union Movement	María de Lourdes Guzmán	11,764	0.63
Puerto Ricans for Puerto Rico	Sadiasept Guillont	5,647	0.30
Write-in		626	0.03
Total votes		1,856,345	100.00
New Progressive hold			
Democratic hold			

=== 2016 ===
2016 Puerto Rico Resident Commissioner election
Party	Candidate	Votes	%
New Progressive	Jenniffer González-Colón	718,591	48.80
Popular Democratic	Héctor Ferrer	695,073	47.21
Independence	Hugo Rodriguez	39,704	2.70
Working People's	Mariana Nogales Molinelli	19,033	1.29
Total votes		1,472,401	100.00
New Progressive hold			
Republican gain from Democratic			

=== 2020 ===
2020 Puerto Rico Resident Commissioner election
Party	Candidate	Votes	%
New Progressive	Jenniffer González-Colón (incumbent)	490,273	40.83
Popular Democratic	Aníbal Acevedo Vilá	384,619	32.03
Citizens' Victory	Zayira Jordán Conde	154,751	12.89
Project Dignity	Ada Norah Henriquez	94,059	7.83
Independence	Luis Piñero González II	76,398	6.36
Write-in		788	0.07
Total votes		1,200,888	100.00
New Progressive hold			
Republican hold			

=== 2024 ===
2024 Puerto Rico Resident Commissioner election
Candidate	Party or alliance		Votes	%
Pablo Hernández Rivera	Democratic	Popular Democratic Party	482,938	44.55
William Villafañe	Republican	New Progressive Party	379,624	35.02
Ana Irma Rivera Lassén	Alianza de País	Citizens' Victory Movement	107,888	9.95
Viviana Ramírez Morales	Republican	Project Dignity	56,974	5.26
Roberto Velázquez (Note: Paper candidate)	Alianza de País	Puerto Rican Independence Party	56,498	5.21
Total			1,083,922	100.00
Valid votes			1,083,922	94.67
Invalid/blank votes			60,996	5.33
Total votes			1,144,918	100.00
Registered voters/turnout				–

== See also ==
- List of United States congressional districts
- Resident Commissioner of the Philippines
