= Adrián González Costa =

Puerto Rican lawyer and politician (born 1983)

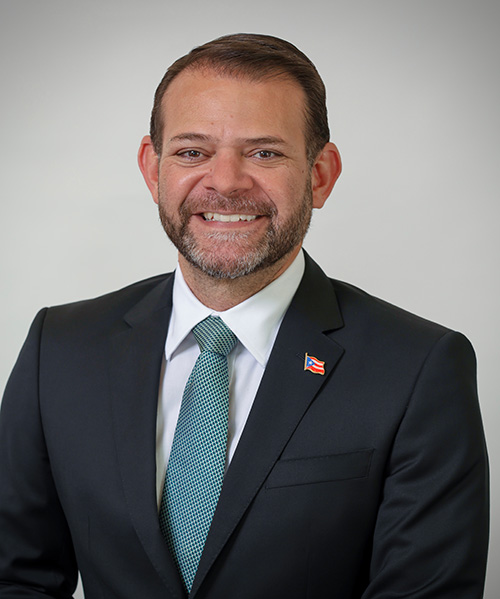

Member of the Senate of Puerto Rico (at-large)
- Incumbent
- Assumed office January 2025

Personal details
- Born: May 3, 1983 (age 43) San Juan, Puerto Rico
- Party: Puerto Rican Independence Party
- Education: University of Puerto Rico (BA); Interamerican University of Puerto Rico School of Law (JD)
- Occupation: Lawyer and politician
- Website: Official Senate page

Adrián González Costa (born May 3, 1983) is a Puerto Rican lawyer and politician affiliated with the Puerto Rican Independence Party (PIP).

== Early life and education ==
González Costa was born in San Juan, Puerto Rico, on May 3, 1983, as the youngest of three siblings. He grew up in the Quebrada Arenas sector, on the border between Guaynabo and Aguas Buenas. He earned a bachelor's degree in Political Science from the University of Puerto Rico, Río Piedras Campus and a Juris Doctor from the Interamerican University of Puerto Rico School of Law. He was admitted to the Puerto Rico Bar in 2010.

During his early years in the legal profession, he participated in community programs serving disadvantaged areas and focused his practice on defending the rights of students enrolled in the Special Education Program of the Puerto Rico Department of Education.

== Political career ==
In 2013, González Costa began his public service career as an adviser to María de Lourdes Santiago, the PIP spokesperson in the Senate of Puerto Rico. At the same time, he served as the party’s spokesperson in the Municipal Legislature of San Juan until 2017. In January 2017, he became the principal adviser to Juan Dalmau Ramírez, then the PIP’s spokesperson in the Senate, and was later appointed the party’s alternate electoral commissioner.

In 2021, González Costa returned to the Senate as director of the office of Senator María de Lourdes Santiago, focusing on public education initiatives related to Act 22 of 2012 and Act 60 of 2019 (the Puerto Rico Incentives Code). In the 2024 legislative elections, he was elected as an at-large senator and took office in January 2025 as deputy spokesperson of the PIP delegation.

== See also ==
- Puerto Rican Independence Party
- Senate of Puerto Rico
