= José Quique Meléndez =

Puerto Rican politician

Quique Meléndez

Majority Leader of the Puerto Rico Senate
- In office January 1997 – January 1, 2001
- Preceded by: Charlie Rodríguez
- Succeeded by: José Luis Dalmau

Member of the Puerto Rico Senate from the Guayama district
- In office January 2, 1993 – January 1, 2001

Personal details
- Born: José Enrique Meléndez Ortiz; October 22, 1948 (age 77) Coamo, Puerto Rico
- Party: New Progressive Party (PNP)
- Spouse: Elba Ortiz Santiago
- Children: 1
- Education: Pontifical Catholic University of Puerto Rico (BBA)

José Enrique "Quique" Meléndez Ortiz is a Puerto Rican politician from the New Progressive Party (PNP). He served as member of the Senate of Puerto Rico from 1993 to 2001.

Meléndez was elected to the Senate of Puerto Rico in the 1992 general election. He represented the District of Guayama. Meléndez was reelected at the 1996 general election.

Meléndez ran for a third term at the 2000 general elections, but was defeated by the candidates of the PPD.

== Personal life ==
Meléndez is married to Elba M. Ortiz Santiago. He has at least one son, José E. Meléndez Ortiz, Jr., who is serving as a member of the Puerto Rico House of Representatives since 2011. In April 2023, José Quique Meléndez speaks out against the independence of Puerto Rico in a forum..

== See also ==
- 21st Senate of Puerto Rico

Senate of Puerto Rico
| Preceded by Charlie Rodríguez | Majority Leader of the Puerto Rico Senate; 1997–2001 | Succeeded by José Luis Dalmau |
