= María de Lourdes Santiago =

Puerto Rican politician

María de Lourdes Santiago Negrón
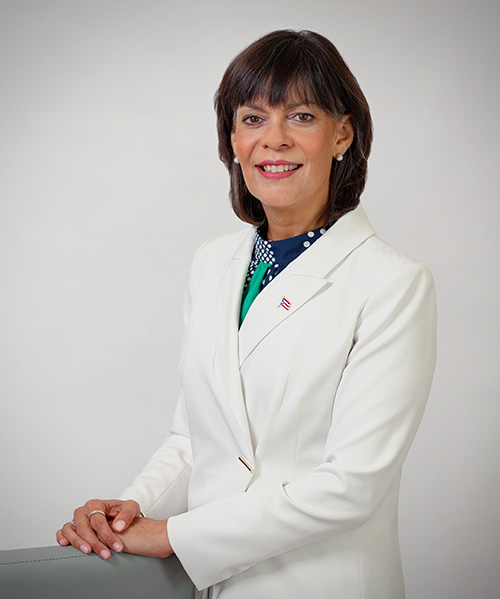
- Santiago Negrón in 2025

Vice President of Puerto Rican Independence Party
- Incumbent
- Assumed office 2001

Member of Puerto Rican Senate from at-large district
- Incumbent
- Assumed office January 2, 2021
- In office January 2, 2013 – January 2, 2017
- In office January 2, 2005 – January 1, 2009

Personal details
- Born: November 13, 1968 (age 57) Adjuntas, Puerto Rico
- Party: PIP
- Children: Jose Julián
- Education: University of Puerto Rico, Río Piedras Campus (B.A. in Drama; J.D.)
- Occupation: Attorney; politician
- Website: Website

María de Lourdes Santiago Negrón is a Puerto Rican lawyer and politician from Adjuntas. She is the current vice-president of the Puerto Rican Independence Party (PIP) and in 2004 became the first woman from that party to be elected into the Senate in the history of Puerto Rico. She currently serves as Senator at-large at the Puerto Rico Senate after being elected in 2020 with the most votes of any candidate. She was re-elected in 2024.

== Biographical facts ==
Santiago Negrón was born in Adjuntas on November 13, 1968, to Ernesto Santiago and Haydée Negrón. After graduating from high school in Adjuntas in 1986, she earned a bachelor's degree in theatre and a Juris Doctor from the University of Puerto Rico at Rio Piedras.

== Career ==
From 1997 to 2000, she worked as a legal counsel for Victor García San Inocencio while he served in the House of Representatives of Puerto Rico, and for Manuel Rodríguez Orellana and Fernando Martín García while they served as Senators.

In January 2001, she was elected as vice-president of her political party, and in 2003 announced her candidacy as Senator for the Puerto Rico General Elections of 2004. On November 2, 2004, Santiago was elected, becoming the first woman to represent the Puerto Rican Independence Party in Puerto Rico's Senate.

As a senator, Santiago has been involved in women's, mental health and special education issues, among others.

Santiago is the writer of a column that is published in the El Vocero newspaper. She was arrested during the Navy-Vieques protests for illegally trespassing military facilities to protest the United States military's bombing practice in Vieques. She spent one month in jail as part of her sentence.

== Personal life ==
Santiago Negrón has one son.
