= 1984 Puerto Rican general election =

- November 6, 1984
- Gubernatorial election
- Turnout: 88.86%
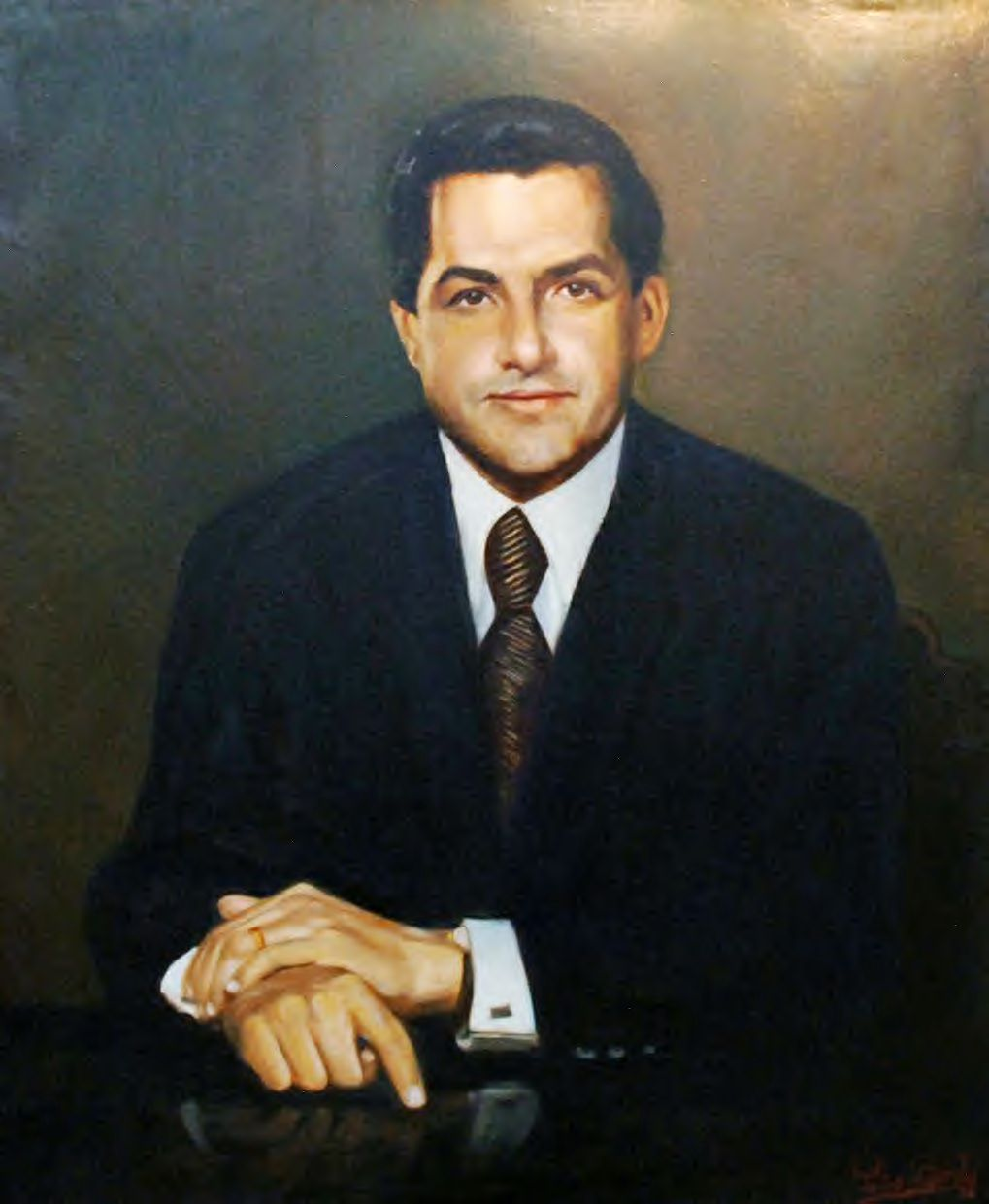

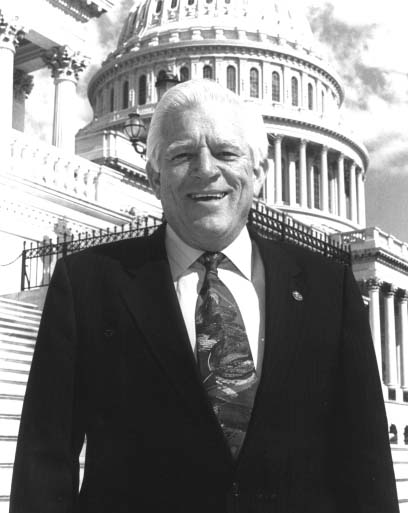
Nominee	Rafael Hernández Colón	Carlos Romero Barceló
Party	Popular Democratic	New Progressive
Alliance	Democratic	Democratic
Popular vote	822,709	768,959
Percentage	47.75%	44.63%
- Results by municipality Colón: 40–50% 50–60% 60–70% Barceló: 40–50% 50–60%
Governor before election
Carlos Romero Barceló
New Progressive
Elected Governor
Rafael Hernández Colón
Popular Democratic
- Resident Commissioner election
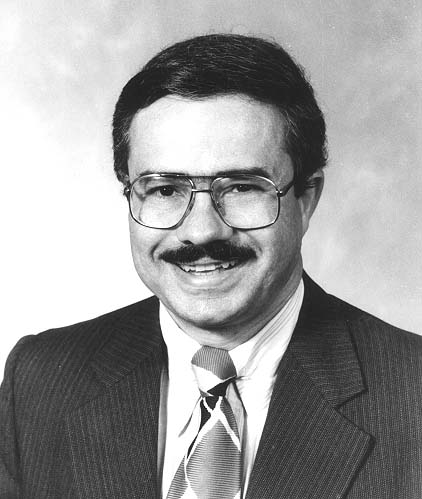

Nominee	Jaime Fuster	Nelson Famadas
Party	Popular Democratic	New Progressive
Alliance	Democratic	Democratic
Popular vote	827,380	769,951
Percentage	48.65%	45.27%

General elections were held in Puerto Rico on November 6, 1984. Rafael Hernández Colón of the Popular Democratic Party (PPD) was elected Governor, whilst the PPD also won a majority of seats in the House of Representatives and the Senate. Voter turnout was 89%.

== Results ==
=== Governor ===
Candidate	Party	Votes	%
Rafael Hernández Colón	Popular Democratic Party	822,709	47.75
Carlos Romero Barceló	New Progressive Party	768,959	44.63
Hernán Padilla	Puerto Rican Renewal Party	69,807	4.05
Fernando Martín García	Puerto Rican Independence Party	61,312	3.56
Total		1,722,787	100.00
Valid votes		1,722,787	98.92
Invalid/blank votes		18,851	1.08
Total votes		1,741,638	100.00
Registered voters/turnout		1,959,877	88.86
Source: Nohlen

=== Resident Commissioner ===
Candidate	Party	Votes	%
Jaime Fuster	Popular Democratic Party	827,380	48.65
Nelson Famadas	New Progressive Party	769,951	45.27
Francisco Catalá Oliveras	Puerto Rican Independence Party	64,001	3.76
Ángel Viera Martínez	Puerto Rican Renewal Party	39,319	2.31
Total		1,700,651	100.00
Registered voters/turnout		1,959,877	–
Source: Nohlen

=== House of Representatives ===
Party	Votes	%	Seats	+/–
Popular Democratic Party			34	+8
New Progressive Party			16	–9
Puerto Rican Independence Party			1	+1
Puerto Rican Renewal Party			0	New
Total			51	0
Valid votes	1,729,108	99.28		
Invalid/blank votes	12,530	0.72		
Total votes	1,741,638	100.00		
Registered voters/turnout	1,959,877	88.86		
Source: Nohlen

=== Senate ===
Party	Seats	+/–
Popular Democratic Party	18	+3
New Progressive Party	8	–4
Puerto Rican Independence Party	1	+1
Total	27	0
Source: Nohlen
