= 1920 Puerto Rican general election =

1920 Puerto Rico elections
- November 2, 1920

General elections were held in Puerto Rico on 2 November 1920. At the time, the Governor of Puerto Rico (Arthur Yager) was appointed by the President of the United States.

They were the first elections after the enactment of the 19th amendment to the United States constitution on August 26, which had granted women the right to vote.

Félix Córdova Dávila was re-elected Resident Commissioner with 51% of the vote.

== Results ==
=== Resident Commissioner ===
Candidate	Party	Votes	%
Félix Córdova Dávila	Union of Puerto Rico	126,446	50.69
Domingo Sepúlveda	Republican Party	63,845	25.60
Prudencio Rivera Martinez	Socialist Party	59,140	23.71
Total		249,431	100.00
Source: Nolla

=== Senate ===
==== At-large members ====
Candidate	Party	Votes	%	Notes
Santiago Iglesias	Socialist Party	55,679	23.26	Elected
Antonio Rafael Barceló	Union of Puerto Rico	46,436	19.40	Elected
Mariano Abril y Ostalo	Union of Puerto Rico	40,971	17.11	Elected
Francisco M. Susoni Abreu	Union of Puerto Rico	37,315	15.59	Elected
José Celso Barbosa	Republican Party	31,220	13.04	Elected
L. Feliú Servera	Republican Party	27,785	11.61	
Total		239,406	100.00	
Source: Nolla

=== House of Representatives ===
==== At-large members ====
Candidate	Party	Votes	%	Notes
Rafael Alonso	Socialist Party	54,869	23.40	Elected
Cayetano Coll y Cuchí	Union of Puerto Rico	45,011	19.20	Elected
Miguel Guerra Mondragón	Union of Puerto Rico	40,249	17.17	Elected
Alfonso Lastra Chárriez	Union of Puerto Rico	35,442	15.12	Elected
Manuel F. Rossy Calderón	Republican Party	31,183	13.30	
Juan Bautista Soto	Republican Party	27,700	11.81	
Total		234,454	100.00	
Source: Nolla

=== Public Service Commissioners ===
Candidate	Party	Votes	%	Notes
Leopoldo Figueroa	Union of Puerto Rico	126,344	25.37	Elected
Guillermo Cabrera	Union of Puerto Rico	126,315	25.36	Elected
Luis Sánchez Morales	Republican Party	62,907	12.63	
Roberto H. Todd Wells	Republican Party	62,840	12.62	
Manuel F. Rojas	Socialist Party	59,831	12.01	
Santiago Carreras	Socialist Party	59,813	12.01	
Total		498,050	100.00	
Source: Nolla
