= Edwin Irizarry Mora =

Puerto Rican politician

Edwin Irizarry Mora (born March 8, 1961, in Mayagüez, Puerto Rico) is an economist, professor and pro-independence leader in Puerto Rico.

== Life ==
He was the Puerto Rican Independence Party candidate for governor of the U.S. Commonwealth of Puerto Rico in the 2008 election. In 2004, he ran for Resident Commissioner of Puerto Rico in Washington, D.C. He is a professor at the University of Puerto Rico at Mayagüez. He holds a Bachelor of Business Administration (Magna Cum Laude) with a major in Accounting and Economics from the Mayaguez campus of the University of Puerto Rico, Master of Economic Planning of the University of Puerto Rico, Rio Piedras Campus and Ph.D. in Development Studies from the Institute of Development Studies (IDS) in the University of Sussex in England.

He has been a professor at the Graduate School of Planning of the UPR and since 1989 has served as professor of economics at the Site of the UPR Mayaguez, an institution in which he holds the post of professor and has directed the Department of Economics . He was President of the Association of Economists of Puerto Rico and has been a member of the Association of Caribbean Economists, of the Association of Caribbean Studies of the Inter-American Planning Society and the Puerto Rican Planning. He graduated as Professional Planner. He has been an advisor to several public and private institutions, cooperatives, associations and nonprofit organizations at the community level.

He has specialized in issues of economic development planning, economy of Puerto Rico, globalization, the critique of privatization and economic aspects of the environment and natural resource management. He has participated actively in public life, occupying several positions in the Puerto Rican Independence Party (PIP), including the Secretariat and the Secretariat for Economic Affairs, besides being adviser to the PIP in the Senate of Puerto Rico.

He is the author of "Economy of Puerto Rico: Trends and Prospects", published by Thomson Learning, a book that is currently used as a text in the current Economic and Social Development of Puerto Rico and other courses on the Puerto Rican economy. The book is based on his doctoral thesis unprecedented Wealth Distribution in the Puerto Rican Model of Development and his experience as a scholar and teacher of courses on the Puerto Rican economy. In 2013, the University of Puerto Rico published his book "Energy sources: community struggles and the environment in Puerto Rico." His intellectual work includes the drafting of over 50 works, among professional articles, technical reports and economic studies and planning. In 2017, he collaborated with a group of colleagues from the University of Puerto Rico in the anthology "Essays for a new economy: Economic Development of Puerto Rico," published by Editorial Callejón. Throughout his more than 20 years of participation in public affairs, he has given hundreds of lectures and talks in Puerto Rico, as well as in several other Latin American and Caribbean countries, in the United States and England.

== See also ==
- University of Puerto Rico at Mayaguez people
