= Nelson Famadas =

Puerto Rican businessman and politician

Nelson Famadas-Alapont was a Puerto Rican businessman who was the New Progressive Party candidate for Resident Commissioner in 1984, as Governor Carlos Romero Barceló's running mate. He previously served as Chief Economic Counsel to Romero Barceló. Famadas, who was born on November 24, 1948, died on January 25, 2010, at the age of 61, after a long illness.

Famadas was the top economic advisor to the Episcopal Church of the United States' Diocese of Puerto Rico, serving on the board of directors of two of its non-profit community-based health-related entities which operate two hospitals and a home-based health care system. At the time of his death he served as vice chairman of the board of Sun American Bank in Boca Ratón, Florida, as chairman and CEO of Gables Holding Corporation, real estate development company and is an adjunct professor, lecturing in operations management, at the School of Business Administration at Florida International University (FIU).

A Democrat, Famadas raised funds for President Barack Obama's presidential campaign. Dr. Famadas held a PhD in business and applied economics from the Wharton School of the University of Pennsylvania.
