= Waldemar Rivera Torres =

Puerto Rican politician

Mayor of Villalba
- In office January 14, 2005 – January 1, 2013
- Succeeded by: Luis Javier Hernández Ortiz

Judge of the Puerto Rico Court of Appeals
- Incumbent
- Assumed office 2015
- Appointed by: Alejandro García Padilla

Personal details
- Born: December 31, 1969 (age 56) Ponce, Puerto Rico
- Party: Popular Democratic Party (PPD)
- Education: University of Puerto Rico at Ponce (BBA); Pontifical Catholic University of Puerto Rico School of Law (JD)

Waldemar Rivera Torres (born December 31, 1969) is a Puerto Rican politician and former mayor of Villalba. Rivera is affiliated with the Popular Democratic Party (PPD) and served as mayor since 2005. He served for eight years before resigning for personal reasons.

== Biography ==
Waldemar Rivera Torres was born on December 31, 1969 in Ponce, Puerto Rico.

In 1992 he earned a bachelor's degree in Business Administration with a concentration in Accounting from the University of Puerto Rico at Ponce, with magna laude honors. In 1996 he obtained Juris Doctor degree from the Pontifical Catholic University of Puerto Rico School of Law in Ponce.

From October 1997 to March 2000 he was Director of the Financial Reporting Audits Area of the Office of Government Ethics. He served as an administrative advisor and examining officer for several municipalities, as well as for the Puerto Rico Mayors Association and the House of Representatives. He held the position of President of the Assistant Superintendence of Public Integrity attached to the Puerto Rico Police for two years.

He served as mayor of Villalba, Puerto Rico from 2004 to 2012. During that time he was the treasurer of the Puerto Rico Mayors Association.

On July 16, 2013, he was sworn in as a Judge of the Court of First Instance, in the Judicial Region of Mayagüez until his swearing-in on December 1, 2015, as Judge of Appeals. Both appointments were made by the Governor of Puerto Rico, Hon. Alejandro García Padilla.
