= Paola Andrea Onzaga-Franco =

Colombian lawyer and advocate for women's empowerment

Paola Andrea Onzaga Franco
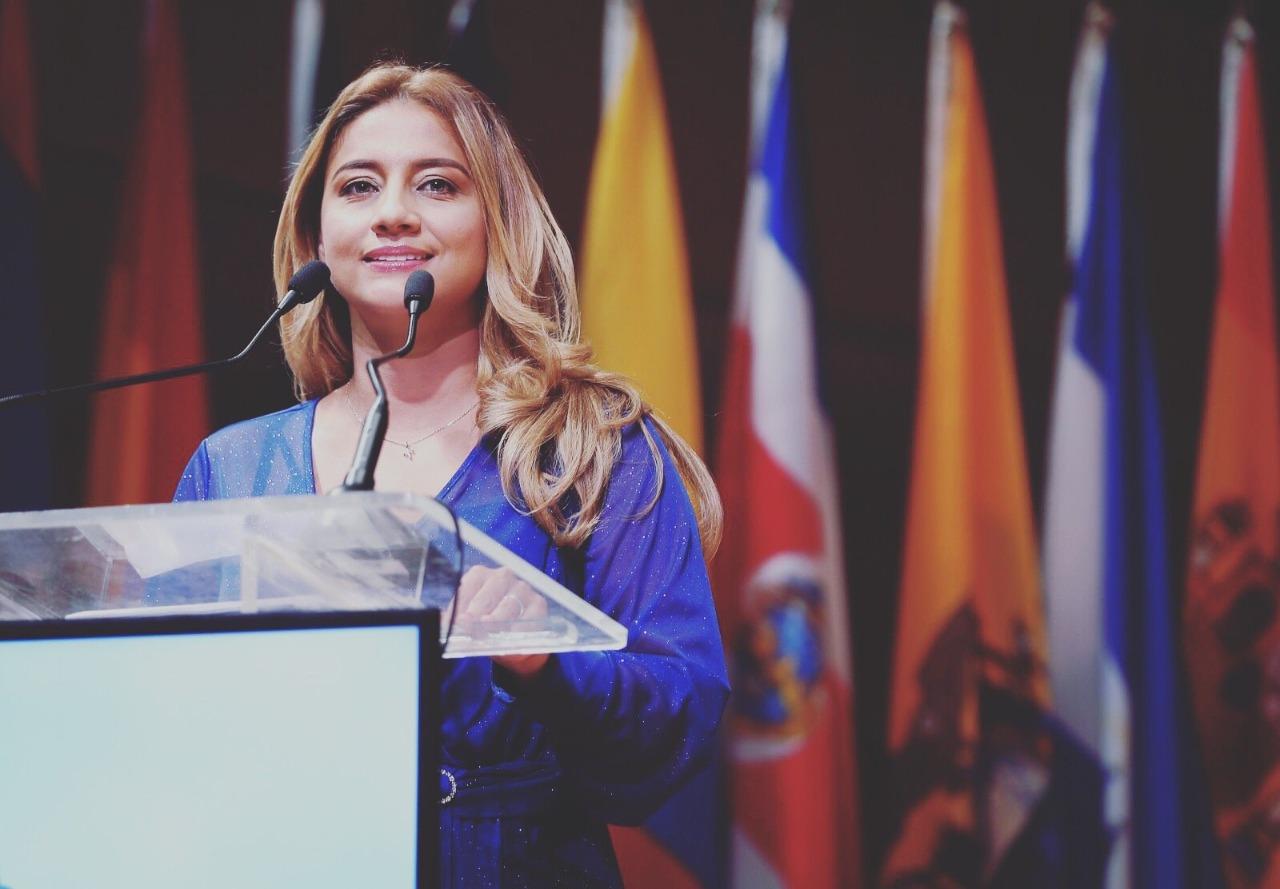
- Born: 18 April 1982 (age 44); Cali (Valle del Cauca), Colombia
- Citizenship: Colombian
- Education: Master's Degree
- Alma mater: Universidad de San Buenaventura; Universidad Santiago de Cali; Universidad de Barcelona
- Occupation: Lawyer
- Years active: 2002-present

Paola Andrea Onzaga Franco (Cali, Valle del Cauca, born April 18, 1982) is a Colombian lawyer who focuses on women's legal empowerment and rights.

== Education ==
Onzaga obtained her law degree from Universidad de San Buenaventura, in Cali, Colombia, and then specialized in Administrative Law at Universidad Santiago de Cali. She subsequently earned a master's degree in Citizenship, Human Rights, Politics and Ethics from Universidad de Barcelona.

== Career ==
After ending her studies in Spain, Onzaga returned to Colombia and has worked as a teacher in Pontificia Universidad Javeriana Cali since 2014.

At the same time, she focused on analyzing the conditions of around two hundred women in Latin America and began her work as facilitator at the political incidence schools for women in Santiago de Cali's town hall. Onzaga was the political-social empowerment coordinator of the Gender Equity Suboffice, where she led the election and conformation of the Municipality Women's Table, in which some women who were former members of the guerrilla combatant forces participated.

Currently, she works with the Successful Women Latam Foundation, in which she organizes talks and events about female empowerment.

== Distinctions ==
Onzaga has received distinctions related to her work in women's empowerment:

- Reconocimiento por contribuir de manera exitosa al país, given by the president of the senate of Puerto Rico: Thomas Rivera Schatz, 2019.
- Mención de felicitación por trabajar en el empoderamiento de las mujeres latinoamericanas, given by Puerto Rican senator Evelyn Vázquez Nieves, 2019.
