= Latin American and Caribbean Congress in Solidarity with Puerto Rico's Independence =

2006 international summit held in Panama City, Panama

The Latin American and Caribbean Congress in Solidarity with the Independence of Puerto Rico consisted of an international summit held in Panama City, Panama. More than two-hundred delegates hailing from twenty-two countries in North and South America met on November 18–19, 2006 to discuss the issue of Puerto Rican sovereignty and proposed independence.

The congress was organized and sponsored by Panama's President Martín Torrijos’s governmental Revolutionary Democratic Party (PRD) and the Puerto Rican Independence Party (PIP).

In the words of President Torrijos, "Puerto Rico is to this day the only Latin American nation remaining under a colonial regime. From the perspective of Latin Americans, assisting in the effort to mend that anomaly is a matter of principles, a continental priority". Torrijos stated that Latin Americans cannot continue being indifferent to said reality. Moreover, the aforementioned dignitary claimed that it is the duty of all Latin Americans to take part actively in its adequate solution.

Rubén Berríos, President of the Puerto Rican Independence Party (PIP), informed of a plan to create committees of solidarity with Puerto Rico throughout the dozens of countries of the region, which are spread throughout two continents (North America and South America, as well as in the Caribbean Basin region), Spain, France, Portugal, San Marino, the Philippines and Syria.

The congress’ participants included fifteen incumbent-governmental parties that, together with dozens of other Latin American political parties, unanimously approved a proclamation calling for the United States to immediately respect Puerto Rico's right to independence and unabridged sovereignty. This proclamation quickly became known as the Panama Proclamation in international circles.

Also present to support Puerto Rico’s independence were Raúl Alfonsín, ex-President of Argentina; Tomás Borge of Nicaragua; and, Ricardo Alarcón of Cuba.

== Sources ==
- Dominican Today daily newspaper

== See also ==
- Puerto Rican Independence Party (PIP)
- Latin American Parliament (PARLATINO)
- Socialist International (SI)
- Manuel Rodríguez Orellana, Esq. - PIP Secretary of Relations with North America
- Raúl Alfonsín
- Rubén Berríos
- Ricardo Alarcón
- Tomás Borge
- Juan Dalmau Ramírez
