= Rubén Berríos =

Puerto Rican politician and activist (born 1939)

Rubén Ángel Berríos Martínez

President of the Puerto Rico Independence Party
- Incumbent
- Assumed office 1970
- Preceded by: Gilberto Concepción de Gracia

At-Large Member of the Puerto Rico Senate
- In office 1993–1997
- In office 1985–1989
- In office 1973–1977

Personal details
- Born: June 21, 1939 (age 87) Aibonito, Puerto Rico
- Party: PIP
- Education: Georgetown University (BBA); Yale University (LLM, JD); University of Oxford (DPhil)
- Occupation: Law professor; president of the Puerto Rican Independence Party

Rubén Ángel Berríos Martínez (born June 21, 1939) is a Puerto Rican politician, international law attorney, writer, and current president of the Puerto Rican Independence Party (PIP). A former three-time senator, Berríos is a perennial PIP candidate for Governor of Puerto Rico. He led the Navy–Culebra protests that succeeded in the United States Navy abandoning the use of the Puerto Rican island of Culebra for military exercises and was a leader for the Cause of Vieques.

== Biography ==
Berríos was born in Aibonito, Puerto Rico. He attended high school at Colegio San Ignacio (class of 1957). He received his bachelor's degree in business administration and economy from Georgetown University in 1961, his juris doctor and master's degree in law from Yale Law School, and his doctoral degree in international rights from Oxford University. He also did some post-doctoral research in Sweden. His first wife was Swedish and his son Rubén Axel was born in Stockholm. He has been a tenured professor of law at the University of Puerto Rico School of Law since 1967.

Berríos became president of the Independence Party PIP when he was thirty-one years old and has been president of it five times during fifty years. Under his leadership, the PIP adopted a democratic socialist program. Although he has had limited success at the voting booth regarding his candidacy for the post of Governor of Puerto Rico in 1976, 1980, 1988, 2000 and 2004 — losing every time to either the Popular Democratic Party (PPD) or the New Progressive Party (PNP) candidate — he, nevertheless, has enjoyed great electoral success regarding his candidacy to the Senate, receiving more votes than any other candidate in the Puerto Rican senatorial elections of 1972, 1984, 1992 and 1996.

In 1972, the thirty-three-year-old Berríos was elected to his first term as an at-large senator. He was also re-elected to at-large senatorial seats at the Puerto Rican Legislative Assembly on three additional occasions: 1984, 1992, and 1996.

Berríos founded the Permanent Conference of Political Parties of Latin America and the Caribbean (COPPPAL), is a member of the Executive Council of the Latin American Human Rights Association (ALDHU), and Honorary President of the Socialist International (SI).

He has published the books The Independence of Puerto Rico: Cause and Struggle, Puerto Rico: Nationality and Plebiscite, and Towards Puerto Rican Socialism, and has collaborated with various publications enjoying wide international prestige such as Foreign Affairs.

In 2015, Nicaraguan President Daniel Ortega named Berrios as his political advisor.

In May 2025, the Socialist International Party awarded the José Francisco Peña Gómez Prize to Ruben Berrios, for his cause in the sovereignty and independence of Puerto Rico.

Berríos is widely admired by many in Puerto Rico, including those who do not follow his political ideology. In 1984, for example, he received 84% of the general vote in his candidacy for senator.

=== Political views ===
Berríos believes that there should be a change in the U.S. maritime laws that force Puerto Rico to import and export goods only via U.S. ships. Such laws increase the price of products entering or leaving the island. He also believes that the U.S. Selective Service laws should not apply to Puerto Rico without the consent of the Puerto Rican legislature.

=== Civil disobedience ===
External audio
- You may listen to one of the speeches made by Rubén Berríos before a Congressional Hearing on YouTube

In 1971, Berríos led the Navy-Culebra protests that criticized the United States Navy's use of the Puerto Rican island of Culebra for military exercises. He squatted in Culebra's Flamenco Beach for three days. He was then arrested and imprisoned for three months. In part because of his efforts, the U.S. Navy abandoned its facilities in Culebra.

On May 8, 1999, Berríos began camping inside the U.S. Navy bombing practice grounds in the island of Vieques, Puerto Rico (see Navy-Vieques protests). He stayed in the Gilberto Concepción de Gracia encampment — baptized in honor of the PIP founder — for 362 consecutive days, enduring both camp devastations due to storms and declining health due to a new diagnosis of prostate cancer. In December 1999, he resigned his Senate seat due to the uncertainty and prolongation of his stay at the encampment.

On May 4, 2000, the encampments were evacuated by federal marshals and United States Marines, and Berríos was arrested. Berríos' arrest was televised island-wide in Puerto Rico.

Five days later, Berríos reentered the Vieques target practice grounds. As a result, he was arrested and went to trial at the United States District Court for the District of Puerto Rico, in San Juan, and sentenced to six hours of detention. Similar to what Berríos Martínez had done in Culebra thirty years before, Berríos did not recognize the jurisdiction of the American judicial forum in Puerto Rico during his trial for the Vieques trespassing, and did not present any legal defense. Speaking to Berríos Martínez, the sentencing judge said, "Odd as it may seem to you, we both are on the side of democracy on this one; you are complying with your conscience. I am also complying with mine."

With the continuation of bombing practices by the U.S. Navy, Berríos announced his intention to enter the restricted grounds for a third time. He stayed for five days in the target practice area, before being arrested violently and forced to lie on a hot gravel road for an extended period of time after being handcuffed with his hands to his back with the other PIP members that accompanied him at the U.S. Navy bombing range. This time, convicted for the fourth time (one in Culebra and three additional civil disobedience arrests) by a United States District Court, Berríos was sentenced to four months in prison.

The U.S. Navy abandoned its facilities in Vieques on May 1, 2003, by order of President George W. Bush.

=== Positions held ===
- Currently a professor at the University of Puerto Rico, School of Law (2006)
- Candidate for Governor of Puerto Rico (1976, 1980, 1988, 2000, 2004)
- Lawyer
- President of Puerto Rican Independence Party (1970 to present)
- Professor of Law at the University of Puerto Rico (1967–1971)
- Senator of Puerto Rico (1972–1976, 1984–1988, 1993–1996)

== Writings, books, speeches ==
Berríos has authored the following works and speeches:

- The Independence of Puerto Rico: Cause and Struggle. Speech before the United Nations about colonialism in Puerto Rico, August 1973
- Towards Puerto Rican Socialism. Puerto Rico
- La Independencia de Puerto Rico: Razón y Lucha, 1984
- Puerto Rico's Decolonization. Foreign Affairs, Council on Foreign Affairs, 1997
- Un Mapa Para la Ruta (A Road Map), 2004.

== See also ==
- List of Puerto Ricans
- Latin American and Caribbean Congress in Solidarity with Puerto Rico's Independence
- Manuel Rodríguez Orellana, Esq. - PIP Secretary of Relations with North America
