= Luis Javier Hernández Ortiz =

Puerto Rican minority leader of the senate

Luis Javier Hernández
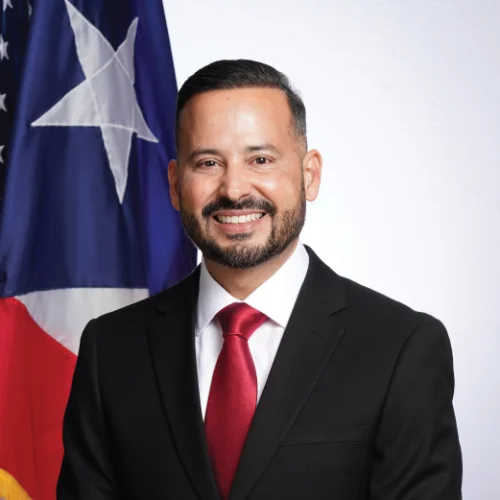
- Hernández Ortiz in 2025

Minority Leader of the Puerto Rico Senate
- Incumbent
- Assumed office January 2, 2025
- Preceded by: Thomas Rivera Schatz

Member of the Puerto Rico Senate from the at-large district
- Incumbent
- Assumed office January 2, 2025

Mayor of Villalba
- In office January 1, 2013 – January 2, 2025
- Preceded by: Waldemar Rivera Torres
- Succeeded by: Danny Santiago Nuñez

Personal details
- Born: Luis Javier Hernández Ortiz; September 5, 1977 (age 49) Ponce, Puerto Rico
- Party: Popular Democratic
- Other political affiliations: Democratic
- Education: University of Puerto Rico, Río Piedras (BA); Pontifical Catholic University of Puerto Rico (JD)

Luis Javier "Javy" Hernández Ortiz, is the former mayor of Villalba, Puerto Rico. He held office from 2013 to 2025. He is one of the youngest mayors of Puerto Rico. Hernández graduated with a Juris Doctor from the Pontifical Catholic University of Puerto Rico. He also studied International Law and European Community Law from the Ortega & Gasset Foundation in Toledo, Spain. He also holds a bachelor's degree in Forensic Psychology from the University of Puerto Rico.

== Career ==
=== Mayor of Villalba ===
Luis Javier Hernández became the mayor of Villalba on January 14, 2013, after the resignation of the elected mayor Waldemar Rivera Torres. He was re-elected in the 2016 and 2020 municipal elections. As mayor, Hernández focused on job creation, education, and social justice. He was instrumental in energizing the Toro Negro I Hydroelectric Plant after Hurricane Maria, bringing electricity to his town in a record time of two months.

During the COVID-19 pandemic, Hernández implemented a tracking program that was later adopted by the Puerto Rico Department of Health statewide. He also introduced "Programa Futuro," an educational initiative to enhance students' academic performance and provide skills for the 21st century. Under his leadership, Villalba became a hub for higher education, with the establishment of institutions like E.D.P. University and Education for Inclusion Academy, a specialized school for students with special needs.

== Personal life ==
Luis Javier Hernández is married to Glendaliz Soto Vega, with whom he has two daughters, Victoria and Isabel. On November 16, 2019, his wife died due to Leukemia.

Senate of Puerto Rico
| Preceded by Thomas Rivera Schatz | Minority Leader of the Puerto Rico Senate; 2025–present | Incumbent |
Political offices
| Preceded by Waldemar Rivera Torres | Mayor of Villalba, Puerto Rico; 2013-2025 | Succeeded by Danny Santiago Nuñez |
