= 1991 Puerto Rican constitutional referendum =

Ballot measure in Puerto Rico

- 8 December 1991

Results
Choice	Votes	%
Yes	559,159	45.85%
No	660,264	54.15%
Valid votes	1,219,423	97.81%
Invalid or blank votes	27,240	2.19%
Total votes	1,246,663	100.00%

A constitutional referendum was held in Puerto Rico on 8 December 1991. The amendments would guarantee:

- The inalienable right to freely and democratically determine Puerto Rico's political status.
- The right to choose a dignified, non-colonial, non-territorial status not subordinate to plenary powers of Congress.
- The right to vote for three alternatives.
- The right that only results with a majority will be considered triumphant in a plebiscite.
- The right that any status would protect Puerto Rico's culture, language and identity, and continued independent participation in international sports events.
- The right that any status guarantees the individual's right to American citizenship.

The changes were rejected by 54.1% of voters, with a turnout of 60.7%.

== Results ==
Choice	Votes	%
For	559,159	45.9
Against	660,264	54.1
Invalid/blank votes	27,240	–
Total	1,246,663	100
Source: Nohlen
