= 1992 Puerto Rican general election =

- November 3, 1992
- Gubernatorial election
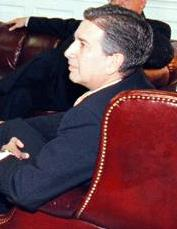
Nominee	Pedro Rosselló	Victoria Muñoz Mendoza
Party	New Progressive	Popular Democratic
Popular vote	938,969	862,989
Percentage	49.90%	45.86%
- Results by municipality Rosselló: 40–50% 50–60% 60–70% Mendoza: 40–50% 50–60%
Governor before election
Rafael Hernández Colón
Popular Democratic
Elected Governor
Pedro Rosselló
New Progressive
- Resident Commissioner election
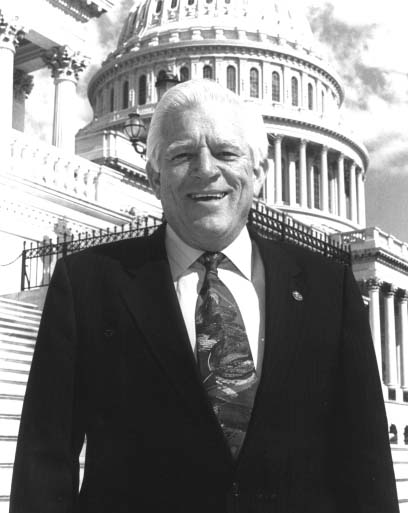

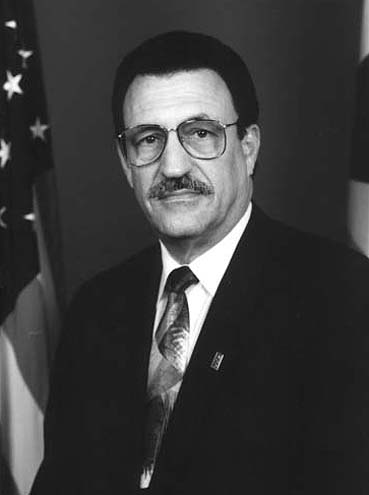
Nominee	Carlos Romero Barceló	Antonio Colorado
Party	New Progressive	Popular Democratic
Popular vote	908,067	891,176
Percentage	48.60%	47.91%
- Results by municipality Barceló: 40–50% 50–60% 60–70% Colorado: 40–50% 50–60%

General elections were held in Puerto Rico on November 3, 1992. Pedro Rosselló of the New Progressive Party (PNP) was elected Governor, whilst the PNP also won a majority of seats in the House of Representatives and the Senate. Voter turnout was between 82% and 84%.

== Results ==
=== Governor ===
Candidate	Party	Votes	%
Pedro Rosselló	New Progressive Party	938,969	49.90
Victoria Muñoz Mendoza	Popular Democratic Party	862,989	45.86
Fernando Martín García	Puerto Rican Independence Party	79,219	4.21
Other candidates		695	0.04
Total		1,881,872	100.00
Registered voters/turnout		2,242,381	–
Source: Nohlen

=== Resident Commissioner ===
Candidate	Party	Votes	%
Carlos Romero Barceló	New Progressive Party	904,067	48.60
Antonio Colorado	Popular Democratic Party	891,176	47.91
Victor García San Inocencio	Puerto Rican Independence Party	63,472	3.41
Other candidates		1,548	0.08
Total		1,860,263	100.00
Registered voters/turnout		2,242,381	–
Source: Nohlen, Elections Puerto Rico

=== House of Representatives ===
Party	At-large			District			Total seats	+/–
Party	Votes	%	Seats	Votes	%	Seats	Total seats	+/–
New Progressive Party	860,843	46.42	6	921,753	49.98	30	36	+21
Popular Democratic Party	728,919	39.31	4	837,351	45.41	10	16	–20
Puerto Rican Independence Party	262,235	14.14	1	83,810	4.54	0	1	–1
Other parties	2,317	0.12	0	1,213	0.07	0	0	–
Total	1,854,314	100.00	11	1,844,127	100.00	40	53	0
Valid votes	1,854,314	99.35						
Invalid votes	4,673	0.25						
Blank votes	7,526	0.40						
Total votes	1,866,513	100.00						
Registered voters/turnout	2,242,381	83.24						
Source: Nohlen, Puerto Rico Election Archive

=== Senate ===
Party	At-large			District			Total seats	+/–
Party	Votes	%	Seats	Votes	%	Seats	Total seats	+/–
New Progressive Party	848,576	45.95	6	1,844,420	50.07	14	20	+12
Popular Democratic Party	717,041	38.83	4	1,675,154	45.48	2	8	–10
Puerto Rican Independence Party	209,009	11.32	1	162,213	4.40	0	1	0
Other parties	1,756	0.10	0	1,659	0.05	0	0	–
Independents	70,189	3.80	0				0	New
Total	1,846,571	100.00	11	3,683,446	100.00	16	29	+2
Valid votes	1,846,571	99.34						
Invalid votes	4,673	0.25						
Blank votes	7,526	0.40						
Total votes	1,858,770	100.00						
Registered voters/turnout	2,242,381	82.89						
Source: Nohlen, Puerto Rico Election Archive
