= Juan Dalmau =

Puerto Rican politician (born 1973)

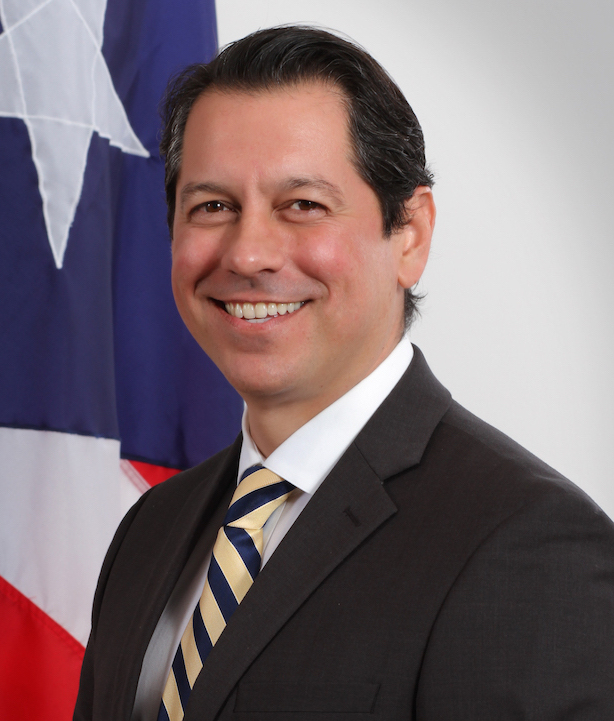
- Dalmau in 2017

Member of the Puerto Rico Senate from the at-large district
- In office January 2, 2017 – January 2, 2021

Personal details
- Born: Juan Manuel Dalmau Ramírez; July 23, 1973 (age 53) San Juan, Puerto Rico
- Party: Puerto Rican Independence Party
- Education: University of Puerto Rico, Río Piedras (BA, JD); Harvard University (LLM)
- Website: Campaign website

Juan Manuel Dalmau Ramírez (born July 23, 1973) is a Puerto Rican politician, attorney and a candidate for Governor of Puerto Rico for the Puerto Rican Independence Party. He was previously a member of the Senate of Puerto Rico, and was a candidate for governor in the 2012, 2020 and 2024 elections.

== Education ==
Dalmau graduated from Notre Dame High School in Caguas, Puerto Rico. In 1995 he obtained a bachelor's degree from the University of Puerto Rico (UPR) in Political Sciences, and a Juris Doctor from the University of Puerto Rico School of Law three years later.

Dalmau was elected editor-in-chief of the UPR Law School's Law Review Journal. He represented the University of Puerto Rico's Law Review in travels abroad, including a trip to Universitat de Barcelona, in Barcelona, Spain. After graduation, Dalmau served as a law clerk for the Chief Justice of the Puerto Rico Supreme Court. In 2000, Dalmau graduated from Harvard University Law School’s Graduate Program, earning his LL.M.

== Career ==
Dalmau worked as a law professor, before politics. Dalmau served as a Legislative Adviser for Senator Manuel Rodríguez Orellana and Fernando Martín, before being elected to serve as Party Commissioner in Municipality Affairs and PIP Secretary General. He currently serves as the Electoral Commissioner of the Puerto Rican Independence Party to Puerto Rico's State Electoral Commission (CEE), in addition to his position as secretary general. He was the Puerto Rican Independence Party’s candidate for governor in 2012 and 2020, getting 2.54% and 13.54% respectively.

In 2020, several days after the election, Dalmau announced he would join the political analysis team of local news chain Noticentro al amanecer. He ran again for governor in 2024, where he came in second with 30.73% of the vote. His platform contained a focus on animal welfare; the first gubernatorial candidate in Puerto Rico to cover the topic in his campaign. Dalmau also campaigned against the tax advantages granted to the rich who come to Puerto Rico.

In April 2025, Dalmau organized a conference at Harvard University and an academic meeting at the University of Chicago for the Puerto Rican diaspora in the United States.

In July 2025, Dalmau declared himself in favor of a possible alliance with MVC, for the election in 2028.

== Personal life ==
Dalmau Ramirez is married and has two children.

== See also ==
- Latin American and Caribbean Congress in Solidarity with Puerto Rico's Independence
- Manuel Rodríguez Orellana - PIP Secretary of Relations with North America
