= 1988 Puerto Rican general election =

- November 8, 1988
- Gubernatorial election
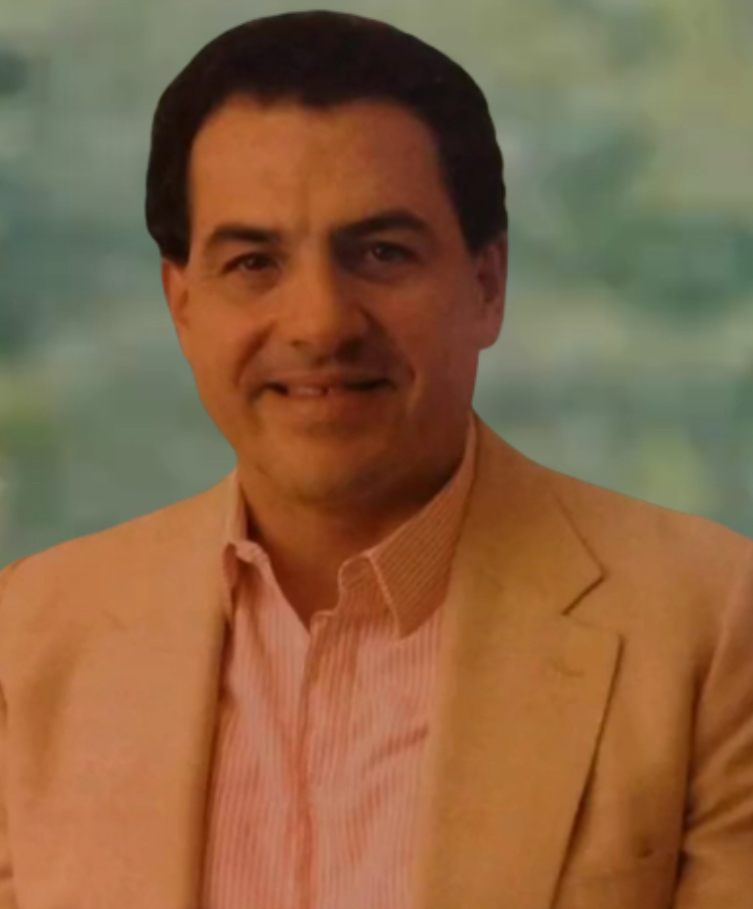

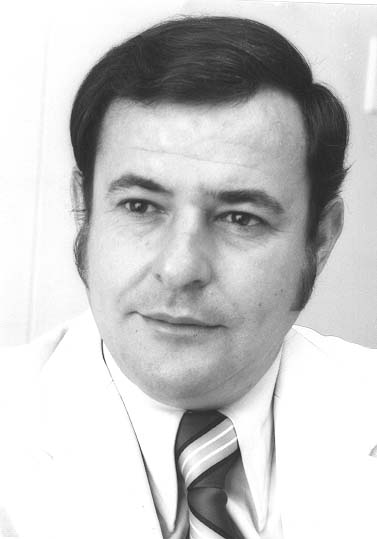

Nominee	Rafael Hernández Colón	Baltasar Corrada del Río	Rubén Berríos
Party	Popular Democratic	New Progressive	Independence
Alliance	Democratic	Republican
Popular vote	871,858	820,342	99,206
Percentage	48.67%	45.79%	5.54%
- Results by municipality Colón: 40–50% 50–60% 60–70% Río: 40–50% 50–60%
Governor before election
Rafael Hernández Colón
Popular Democratic
Elected Governor
Rafael Hernández Colón
Popular Democratic
- Resident Commissioner election
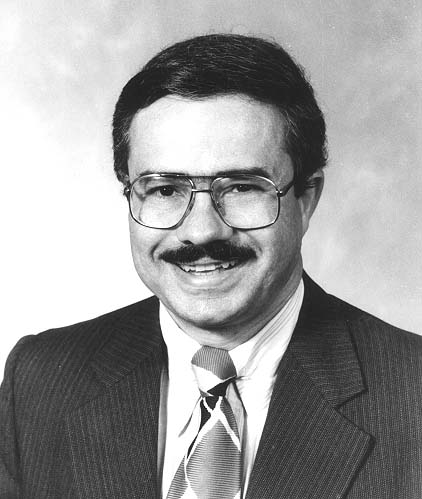

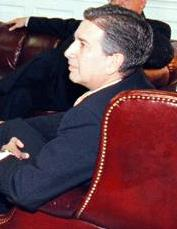
Nominee	Jaime Fuster	Pedro Rosselló
Party	Popular Democratic	New Progressive
Alliance	Democratic	Democratic
Popular vote	864,396	821,896
Percentage	48.96%	46.55%
- Results by municipality Fuster: 40–50% 50–60% 60–70% Rosselló: 40–50% 50–60%

General elections were held in Puerto Rico on November 8, 1988. Rafael Hernández Colón of the Popular Democratic Party (PPD) was re-elected Governor, whilst the PPD also won a majority of seats in the House of Representatives and the Senate. Voter turnout was 85%.

== Results ==
=== Governor ===
Candidate	Party	Votes	%
Rafael Hernández Colón	Popular Democratic Party	871,858	48.67
Baltasar Corrada del Río	New Progressive Party	820,342	45.79
Rubén Berríos Martínez	Puerto Rican Independence Party	99,206	5.54
Total		1,791,406	100.00
Valid votes		1,791,406	98.82
Invalid/blank votes		21,456	1.18
Total votes		1,812,862	100.00
Registered voters/turnout		2,144,583	84.53
Source: Nohlen

=== Resident Commissioner ===
Candidate	Party	Votes	%
Jaime Fuster	Popular Democratic Party	867,532	48.96
Pedro Rosselló	New Progressive Party	824,879	46.55
Luis Pío Sánchez Longo	Puerto Rican Independence Party	79,557	4.49
Total		1,771,968	100.00
Registered voters/turnout		2,144,583	–
Source: Nohlen

=== House of Representatives ===
Party	Votes	%	Seats	+/–
Popular Democratic Party			36	+2
New Progressive Party			15	–1
Puerto Rican Independence Party			2	+1
Puerto Rican Renewal Party			0	New
Total			53	+2
Valid votes	1,729,108	99.28		
Invalid/blank votes	12,530	0.72		
Total votes	1,741,638	100.00		
Source: Nohlen

=== Senate ===
Party	Seats	+/–
Popular Democratic Party	18	0
New Progressive Party	8	0
Puerto Rican Independence Party	1	0
Total	27	0
Source: Nohlen
