= Gilberto Concepción de Gracia =

Puerto Rican politician

- Founder of the Puerto Rican Independence Party
- Born: July 9, 1909; Vega Alta, Puerto Rico
- Died: March 16, 1968 (aged 58); Santurce, Puerto Rico
- Education: University of Puerto Rico (BA); University of Puerto Rico School of Law (JD, LL.M.); George Washington University Law School (SJD)
- Organization: Puerto Rican Independence Party

Dr. Gilberto Concepción de Gracia (July 9, 1909 – March 16, 1968) was a lawyer, journalist, author, politician, former senator and founder of the Puerto Rican Independence Party. He is the great-uncle of maternal siblings Residente and ILE of Calle 13, and Lin-Manuel Miranda.

== Early years ==
Concepción de Gracia was born in the town of Vega Alta, Puerto Rico to Ceferino Concepción Álvarez and Carmen de Gracia Toro. There he attended José de Diego elementary school in his hometown of Vega Alta and "Central High School" in Santurce, a district of San Juan, Puerto Rico. After he graduated from high school, he continued his academic education studies and earned a bachelors and later master's degree in Law and Public Administration from the University of Puerto Rico. He earned a doctorate in Law from George Washington University Law School in Washington, D.C.

== Career as a lawyer ==
Concepción de Gracia worked as a lawyer specializing in civil and constitutional law. In 1936, at the age of 25, he moved to New York to represent Pedro Albizu Campos and other members of the Puerto Rican Nationalist Party, who were jailed and appealing their case.

Concepción de Gracia remained in New York, defending the civil rights of Hispanic workers and other minorities. He became more involved in politics, and particularly the cause of Puerto Rican independence from the United States. He befriended the like-minded congressman Vito Marcantonio, and took the editorship of a newspaper called La Voz ("The Voice").

== Educator ==
Concepción de Gracia later became a professor of Hispanic literature at Middlebury College in Vermont. He then moved to Washington, D.C., and worked at the Panamerican Union, the organization which would later be known as the Organization of American States. In 1943, while he continued to pursue his Law education, Concepcion de Gracia joined a group called the 'Congress for Independence', which advocated the independence of Puerto Rico.

== Puerto Rican Independence Party ==
Flag of the Puerto Rican Independence Party

On October 20, 1946, the Puerto Rican Independence Party (Partido Independentista Puertorriqueño, or PIP) was created with Concepción de Gracia as its president. The PIP was registered as an official political party in 1948 and participated in that year's elections. It became the second-largest party in Puerto Rico in 1952, when it captured 20% of the electoral vote. Fifteen (15) PIP members were elected to the House of Representatives of Puerto Rico that year. Concepcion de Gracia himself joined the Senate of Puerto Rico, and became the speaker for his party, a post which he held until 1960.

That year, the Popular Democratic Party of Puerto Rico (PPD) won the governorship and created a political status known as the Associated Free State (Estado Libre Asociado, or ELA). Concepcion de Gracia claimed that the new status was only a deceptive way to hide and continue the colonial relationship with the U.S.

On July 25, 1952, Puerto Rico adopted a constitution establishing its status as a commonwealth. Concepción de Gracia and the PIP considered this status to be just another name for colonialism, and did not participate in the Constitutional Assembly.

== Puerto Rico before the United Nations ==
External audio
- You may watch and listen to part 1 of the documentary "Gilberto Concepción de Gracia... y de batalla" on YouTube
- and to part 2 here on YouTube.

Concepción de Gracia and Julio Pinto Gandía took Puerto Rico's case before the United Nations and sustained that Puerto Ricans should have the right to a consultation before being sent to any war. He also protested the sterilization practices in the U.S. of Puerto Ricans and the passive immigration of Puerto Ricans to the U.S.

In 1955 he represented Puerto Rico in a conference held in Bandung, Indonesia sponsored by the United Nations. He also represented the PIP at the 1949 conference of the Organization of American States held in Havana, Cuba, and at the 1957 conference in Maracay, Venezuela. In 1964 he represented the PIP at a United States Congress commission on Puerto Rico's political status. Gilberto Concepción de Gracia died on March 15, 1968, in Santurce, Puerto Rico. He was buried at Santa María Magdalena de Pazzis Cemetery in San Juan, Puerto Rico.

== In memory ==
Concepción de Gracia's name has been attached to many places in Puerto Rico, including the beach on the contested island of Vieques where the PIP established a camp in 1999 during the Navy-Vieques protests. His native town of Vega Alta erected a statue in his honor in the town's square.

== See also ==
- List of Puerto Ricans
- Puerto Rican Independence Party
