= Puerto Rican Independence Party =

Puerto Rican political party

Puerto Rican Independence Party Partido Independentista Puertorriqueño
- President: Rubén Berríos Martínez
- Secretary-General: Juan Dalmau Ramírez; Adrián González Costa
- Vice-president: María de Lourdes Santiago Negrón
- Executive President: Fernando Martín García
- Representative: Denis Márquez Lebrón
- Founded: October 27, 1946; 80 years ago
- Split from: Popular Democratic Party
- Headquarters: San Juan, Puerto Rico
- Youth wing: Juventud PIP
- Overseas wing: Diáspora PIP
- Ideology: Social democracy Democratic socialism Puerto Rican independence
- Political position: Center-left
- National affiliation: Alianza de País
- Regional affiliation: COPPPAL
- International affiliation: Socialist International
- Colors: Green and white
- Seats in the Senate: 2 / 27
- Seats in the House of Representatives: 3 / 51
- Municipalities: 0 / 78
- Seats in the U.S. House: 0 / 1

Party flag

Website
- patrianuevapr

The Puerto Rican Independence Party (Spanish: Partido Independentista Puertorriqueño, PIP) is a social-democratic political party in Puerto Rico that campaigns for the independence of Puerto Rico from the United States.

Those who follow the PIP ideology are usually called independentistas, pipiolos or pro-independence activists.

== History ==
The party began as the electoral wing of the Puerto Rican independence movement. It is the largest of the independence parties, and the only one that is on the ballot during elections (other candidates must be added in by hand). In 1948, two years after being founded, the PIP gathered 10.2% of the votes in the island. In 1952, two years after an armed uprising of the Puerto Rican Nationalist Party, it obtained 19% of the votes, its highest electoral support ever, which made it the second electoral party on the island for a moment. In 1956 it took 12.4% of the votes; in 1960 3.1%; in 1964, 4%; in 1968, 3.5%; in 1972, 5.4%; in 1976, 5.7%; in 1980, 5.4%; in 1984, 3.6%, and in 1988, 5.5%. In 2004 it obtained 2.7% of the votes, and in 2008 it took 2%.

=== Founding ===
The party was founded on 27 October 1946, by Gilberto Concepción de Gracia (1909–1968), his colleague Fernando Milán Suárez and Antonio J. González. They felt the independence movement had been betrayed by the Popular Democratic Party, whose ultimate goal had originally been independence.

=== FBI surveillance of the party ===
Former FBI Director Louis Freeh admitted 2003 in a congressional budget hearing that the FBI had engaged in suppression of Puerto Rican independence groups from the 1930s to the 1990s, including surveillance of the Puerto Rican Independence Party. The actions undertaken by the FBI have been described as "egregious illegal action, maybe criminal action."

After Freeh's public admission, The New York Times reported the following details about actions against the Puerto Rican Independence Party:

They include a 1961 directive from Mr. Hoover to seek information on 12 independence movement leaders, six of them operating in New York, "concerning their weaknesses, morals, criminal records, spouses, children, family life, educational qualifications and personal activities other than independence activities." The instructions were given under the domestic surveillance program known as COINTELPRO, which aimed at aggressively monitoring antiwar, leftist and other groups in the United States and disrupting them.

In the case of Puerto Rican independence groups, J. Edgar Hoover's 1961 memo refers to 'our efforts to disrupt their activities and compromise their effectiveness.' Scholars say the papers provide invaluable additions to the recorded history of Puerto Rico. "I expect that this will alter somewhat the analysis of why independence hasn't made it,' said Félix V. Matos Rodríguez, director of the center at Hunter. 'In the 1940s, independence was the second-largest political movement in the island, (after support for commonwealth status), and a real alternative. But it was criminalized.'

The existence of the FBI papers came to light during a US House of Representatives Appropriations Subcommittee hearing in 2000, when Representative José E. Serrano of New York questioned Louis J. Freeh, then FBI director, on the issue. Freeh gave the first public acknowledgment of the federal government's Puerto Rican surveillance and offered a mea culpa.

'Your question goes back to a period, particularly in the 1960s, when the F.B.I. did operate a program that did tremendous destruction to many people, to the country and certainly to the F.B.I.,' Freeh said, according to transcripts of the hearing. Freeh said that he would make the files available 'and see if we can redress some of the egregious illegal action, maybe criminal action, that occurred in the past'.".

The FBI's surveillance of persons and organizations advocating Puerto Rico's independence, was not only recognized by the FBI's top leadership, but was also detailed in 1.8 million documents, a fraction of which were released in 2000.

The political repression of the party and the independence movement at large by the U.S. Federal Government between the years 1930 and 1975, coupled with an absorption of some cultural-nationalist ideology by the populares in the years thereafter have been identified as major reasons for the electoral decline of the party leading to its loss of official status in 2008.

=== 1970s ===
In 1971, the PIP gubernatorial candidate, Rubén Berríos led a protest against the US Navy in Culebra. During the 1972 elections, the PIP showed the largest growth in its history while running a democratic socialist, pro-worker, pro-poor campaign. One year later, during a delegate assembly, Rubén Berríos declared that the party was not presenting a Marxist–Leninist platform and took the matter to the PIP's assembly which voted in favor of the party's current stance in favor of social democracy. The Marxist–Leninist faction, called the "terceristas", split into several groups. The biggest of them went into the Popular Socialist Movement, while the rest went into the Puerto Rican Socialist Party.

=== 1990s ===
In 1999, PIP leaders, especially Rubén Berríos, became involved in the Navy-Vieques protests started by many citizens of Vieques against the presence of the US military in the island-municipality (see also: Cause of Vieques).

=== 2008 election ===
During the 2008 elections, the PIP lost official recognition for the second time, obtaining 2.04% of the gubernatorial vote. Loss of recognition was official on 2 January 2009. The minimum vote percentage to keep official recognition is 3.0% as per the Commonwealth of Puerto Rico law. The party also lost both of its seats in the legislature, where they had had one seat in each house.

In May 2009, the party submitted more than 100,000 signed petitions to the Puerto Rico's elections commission and regained legal status.

=== 2012 election ===
During the 2012 elections, the PIP lost official recognition for the third time, obtaining 2.5% of the gubernatorial vote. Loss of recognition became official on 2 January 2013. The minimum vote percentage to keep official recognition is 3.0% as per the Commonwealth of Puerto Rico law.

=== 2016 election ===
For the 2016 election, Senator María de Lourdes Santiago was the party's nominee. She obtained 33,452 votes and came in fifth place, with 2.1% of the vote. Some of the senator's main policies for the election are outlined below.

- Increase the basic teacher's salary to $3,000 per month.
- Universal healthcare through the National Health Plan.
- Merge the House of Representatives and the Senate into one unicameral chamber, whereby the members are elected by proportional representation.
- Change the status of Puerto Rico to that of a Freely Associated State.

=== 2020 election ===
For the 2020 election, Juan Dalmau was the party's nominee. He obtained 175,402 votes and came in fourth place, with a historic 13.58% of the vote, the second-best electoral performance in PIP history. With the Movimiento Victoria Ciudadana (Citizens' Victory Movement) obtaining 179,265 votes and coming in third place with 13.95% of the vote, this has been the largest share of the Puerto Rican vote (27.53%) ever gained by left-wing parties in Puerto Rico.

=== 2024 election ===
Juan Dalmau is on the list of candidates for the general elections of November 5, 2024. PIP formed an alliance with Movimiento Victoria Ciudadana called Alianza de País.

The Puerto Rican Independence Party also filed a petition before the Supreme Court of Puerto Rico against the holding of the non-binding referendum on the status of Puerto Rico. The Supreme Court of Puerto Rico accepted this petition on July 16. The Supreme Court's resolution, gives a "non-extendable deadline" of 15 days to the requesting party to present its argument. After this deadline, the defendant will have 15 days to present its arguments. On August 22, 2024, the Puerto Rico Supreme Court dismissed the petition, allowing for the referendum to proceed on November 5, 2024.

== International support ==
External audio
- You may watch and listen to a Puerto Rican Independence Party political campaign ad featuring Ruben Berrios and the voice of José Feliciano in an interpretation of Antonio Caban Vales' "Verde Luz'" here.]

The PIP cause receives moral support from international organizations. Examples of these are the Socialist International (the largest organization of political parties in the world), including fifteen political parties which are in power in Latin America. The government of Cuba also supports it, as well as the ex-president of Panama, Martín Torrijos, and a wide group of world-recognized writers and artists.

On 26 January 2007, the Nobel Prize laureate Gabriel García Márquez joined other figures such as Mario Benedetti, Ernesto Sábato, Thiago de Mello, Eduardo Galeano, Carlos Monsiváis, Pablo Armando Fernández, Jorge Enrique Adoum, Pablo Milanés, Luis Rafael Sánchez, Mayra Montero and Ana Lydia Vega, in supporting independence for Puerto Rico and joining the Latin American and Caribbean Congress in Solidarity with Puerto Rico's Independence, which approved a resolution favoring the island's right to assert its independence, as ratified unanimously by political parties hailing from 22 countries in November 2006. García Márquez's push for the recognition of Puerto Rico's independence was obtained at the behest of the Puerto Rican Independence Party. His pledge for support to the Puerto Rican Independence Movement was part of a wider effort that emerged from the Latin American and Caribbean Congress in Solidarity with Puerto Rico's Independence.

On 18 June 2021 the United Nations associated Special Committee on Decolonization published a draft resolution calling on the United States to facilitate a process that enables the people of Puerto Rico to exercise their right to self-determination and independence. Juan Dalmau spoke before the committee to represent the party stating that the colonial experience of the United States in Puerto Rico had failed and its harmful consequences were still visible.

The Puerto Rican Independence Party has an overseas wing in the United States called Diáspora PIP, it is based in New York, Miami, Chicago, New Jersey, San Francisco, Portland, Connecticut and Seattle.

== Party platform and ideology ==
=== PIP anti-war mobilization and protests ===
As reported in numerous media, the PIP's leadership and active members participated in anti-war protests and mobilization to resist the Iraq War and oppose the U.S. government's efforts to encourage Puerto Ricans to enlist in the U.S. Armed Forces. The Washington Post wrote in August 2007 that "on this island with a long tradition of military service, pro-independence advocates are tapping the territory's growing anti-Iraq war sentiment to revitalize their cause. As a result, 57 percent of Puerto Rico's 10th-, 11th- and 12th-graders, or their parents, have signed forms over the past year withholding contact information from the Pentagon. ... For five years, PIP has issued opt-out forms to about 120,000 students in Puerto Rico and encouraged them to sign—and independista activists expect this year to mark their most successful effort yet." The article also quoted Juan Dalmau, then-secretary general of the Puerto Rican Independence Party as saying: "if the death of a Puerto Rican soldier is tragic, it's more tragic if that soldier has no say in that war [with Iraq]" and that he did not want the children of Puerto Rico to become "colonial cannon meat."

Another article in The Progressive also reported on PIP's anti-war activity. It was written three years earlier, in 2004, but it still noted that "some groups like the Puerto Rico Bar Association and the Independence Party have registered strong protests against the deployments. In an attempt to draw attention to Puerto Ricans' lack of elected representatives, even the usually pro-U.S. statehood party has raised concerns about the disproportionate body count suffered by islanders." Two years later, it was reported that PIP, along with hundreds of other supporters of Puerto Rican independence "blocked the entrance to the U.S. Federal Courthouse here on Feb. 20 to denounce recent FBI raids against the homes and workplaces of ... supporters of Puerto Rican independence ... and the growing repression by the FBI against the independence movement in general." This demonstration reportedly marked the beginning of PIP "campaign to get the FBI out of Puerto Rico."

=== PIP stance on Puerto Rico's economic crisis and taxation system ===
During the 2005–2007 Puerto Rico economic crisis, the Puerto Rican Independence Party submitted various bills that would have taxed corporations making $1 million or more in annual net profits an extra ten percent above the average tax rate these corporations pay, which hovers around 5%. The PNP and the PPD parties amended the bill, taxing the corporations the traditional lower rate. Despite objections presented by the PIP, the PNP and PPD also allowed the companies to claim the additional tax as a credit on next year's bill, making the "tax", in effect, a one-year loan. Puerto Rico has been said "There is no place in the territorial limits of the United States that provides such an advantageous base for exporters. " Because of this, many US companies moved their headquarters and manufacturing facilities there. This is why the PNP and PPD believed the tax increase would exacerbate the problems

=== Disfranchisement due to residence in Puerto Rico ===
United States citizens residing in the U.S. commonwealth of Puerto Rico do not hold the right to vote in U.S. presidential elections. Although residents of Puerto Rico elect a Resident Commissioner to the United States House of Representatives, that official may not participate in votes determining the final passage of legislation. Furthermore, Puerto Rico holds no representation of any kind in the United States Senate.

Both the Puerto Rican Independence Party and the New Progressive Party of Puerto Rico officially oppose the island's political status quo and consider Puerto Rico's lack of federal representation to be disfranchisement. The remaining political organization, the Popular Democratic Party, is less active in its opposition of this case of disfranchisement but has officially stated that it favors fixing the remaining "deficits of democracy" that the Clinton and George W. Bush administrations have publicly recognized in writing through Presidential Task Force Reports.

== Party symbol ==
The PIP's symbol is a Scandinavian white cross on a green flag; because of this and its commitment to protecting the environment and promoting sustainable development, it is identified as the green party by both the voting public and ballots.

The flag's green color stands for the hope of becoming free, and the white cross stands for the sacrifice and commitment of the party with democracy. The flag's design is based on the first national flag ever flown by Puerto Ricans, which is also the current flag of the municipality of Lares, location where the first relatively successful attempt of revolutionary insurgency in Puerto Rico, called Grito de Lares, took place on 23 September 1868. The Lares flag is, on the other hand, similar to that of the Dominican Republic, since the Grito's mastermind, Ramón Emeterio Betances, not only admired the Dominican pro-independence struggle, but was also half-Dominican himself. The party's flag is based on the Nordic Cross flag design. Nordic Cross flags, or Latin cross flags, are a common design in Scandinavia and other parts of the world, and in theory, the PIP's emblem belongs to this family of flags.

== Officials ==
=== Senate ===
- María de Lourdes Santiago (2005-2009, 2013-2017, 2021–present)
- Adrián González Costa (2025–present)

=== Representatives ===
- Denis Márquez Lebrón (2017–present)

=== Former Officials ===
==== Senate ====
- Rubén Berríos (1993?-2001)
- Fernando Martín García (2001-2005)
- Juan Dalmau (2017–2021)

==== Representatives ====
- Víctor García San Inocencio (1997–2009)

== Electoral performance ==
=== Governor of Puerto Rico (Gobernador de Puerto Rico) ===
Year	Candidate	Votes	%	+/-	Result
1948	Francisco Susoni	65,351	10.20 / 100	▲10.20%	3rd
1952	Francisco Milán	126,228	18.98 / 100	▲8.68%	2nd
1956	Francisco Susoni	86,636	12.35 / 100	▼6.63%	3rd
1960	Julio García Diaz	24,211	3.07 / 100	▼9.28%	4th
1964	Gilberto Concepción de Gracia	23,340	2.81 / 100	▼0.26%	4th
1968	Antonio J. González	32,166	3.50 / 100	▲0.69%	4th
1972	Noel Colón Martínez	69,654	5.36 / 100	▲1.86%	3rd
1976	Rubén Berríos	83,037	5.67 / 100	▲0.31%	3rd
1980	Rubén Berríos	87,272	5.42 / 100	▼0.25%	3rd
1984	Fernando Martín García	61,312	3.52 / 100	▼1.90%	4th
1988	Rubén Berríos	99,206	5.47 / 100	▲1.95%	3rd
1992	Fernando Martín García	79,219	4.21 / 100	▼1.26%	3rd
1996	David Noriega Rodríguez	73,305	3.73 / 100	▼0.48%	3rd
2000	Rubén Berríos	104,705	5.23 / 100	▲1.50%	3rd
2004	Rubén Berríos	54.551	2.74 / 100	▼2.49%	3rd
2008	Edwin Irizarry Mora	39,590	2.04 / 100	▼0.70%	4th
2012	Juan Dalmau Ramírez	46,998	2.52 / 100	▲0.50%	3rd
2016	María de Lourdes Santiago	33,729	2.31 / 100	▼0.21%	5th
2020	Juan Dalmau Ramírez	175,402	13.58 / 100	▲11.27%	4th
2024	Juan Dalmau Ramírez	391,945	30.81 / 100	▲17%	2nd

=== Resident Commissioner of Puerto Rico (Comisionado Residente de Puerto Rico) ===
Year	Candidate	Votes	%	+/-	Result
1980	Marta Font de Calero	83,911	5.30 / 100	▲5.30%	3rd
1984	Francisco Catalá Oliveras	64,001	3.80 / 100	▼1.30%	3rd
1988	Luis Pío Sánchez Longo	79,557	4.50 / 100	▲0.70%	3rd
1992	Victor García San Inocencio	63,472	3.40 / 100	▼1.10%	3rd
1996	Manuel Rodríguez Orellana	68,828	3.50 / 100	▲0.10%	3rd
2000	Manuel Rodríguez Orellana	95,067	4.80 / 100	▲1.30%	3rd
2004	Edwin Irizarry Mora	56,589	2.90 / 100	▼1.90%	3rd
2008	Jessica Martinez Birriel	37,865	2.00 / 100	▼0.90%	4th
2012	Juan Mercado Nieves	38,941	2.10 / 100	▲0.10%	3rd
2016	Hugo Rodríguez	39,395	2.70 / 100	▲0.60%	5th
2020	Luis Roberto Piñero	78,503	6.30 / 100	▲3.60%	5th
2024	Roberto Karlo Velázquez Correa	55,383	5.22 / 100	▼1.08%	4th

=== Legislative elections ===
House of Representatives of Puerto Rico (Cámara de Representantes de Puerto Rico)
Year	District votes	%	At-large votes	%	Seats	+/–
1992	83.850	4.6	262,235	14.1	1 / 51	▼ -1
1996	88,790	4.6	140,964	7.5	1 / 51	0
2000	112,592	5.8	224,765	11.6	1 / 51	0
2004	77,289	4.0	186,197	9.7	1 / 51	0
2008	40,269	2.1	93,816	5.0	0 / 51	▼ -1
2012	48,606	2.7	86,716	4.8	0 / 51	0
2016	71,442	4.8	121,066	8.3	1 / 51	▲1
2020	102,266	8.7	127,577	10.6	1 / 51	0
2024	112,652	9.7			1 / 51	0

Senate of Puerto Rico (Senado de Puerto Rico)
Year	District votes	%	At-large votes	%	Seats	+/–
1992	162.215	4.2	209,009	11.3	1 / 29	0
1996	175.500	4.6	160,005	8.5	1 / 28	0
2000	221,411	5.8	217,390	11.3	1 / 28	0
2004	160,632	4.2	178,541	9.4	1 / 27	0
2008	80,920	2.2	90,171	4.8	0 / 27	▼ -1
2012	97,626	2.7	138,167	7.7	1 / 27	▲1
2016	150,904	5.3	130,583	8.9	1 / 30	0
2020	205,137	9.0	136,679	11.3	1 / 27	0
2024	198,570	8.9	178,575	15.0	1 / 51	0

== Important party leaders ==
- Rubén Berríos – President, former Senator and Honorary President of the Socialist International (SI)
- Manuel Rodríguez Orellana – Secretary of Relations with North America
- Fernando Martín – Executive President, former Senator
- María de Lourdes Santiago Negrón – Vice-president, Senator
- Juan Dalmau Ramírez – Secretary General & Electoral Commissioner
- Edwin Irizarry Mora – Secretary of Economic Affairs
- Adrián González Costa – Secretary of Organization, Senator
- Roberto Iván Aponte – Secretary of Municipal Organization
- Luis Roberto Piñero – President of the Pro-Independence Advocates' Campaign in favor of unifying both Houses of the Legislature into a single, unicameral Parliament
- Víctor García San Inocencio – Former Representative
- Victor Alvarado Guzman – Adviser on Environmental Sciences and Public Policy Affairs
- Jessica Martínez – Member of Pro-Independence Advocates' Campaign in Favor of a single, unicameral Parliament
- Gilberto Concepción de Gracia – Founding President and respected Latin American Leader

== See also ==
- Latin American and Caribbean Congress in Solidarity with Puerto Rico's Independence
- List of political parties in Puerto Rico
- Puerto Rican Socialist Party
- Cause of Vieques
- Cerro Maravilla murders
- Navy-Culebra protests
- Navy-Vieques protests
- Politics of Puerto Rico
- Socialist International
