= Fernando Martín García =

Puerto Rican politician

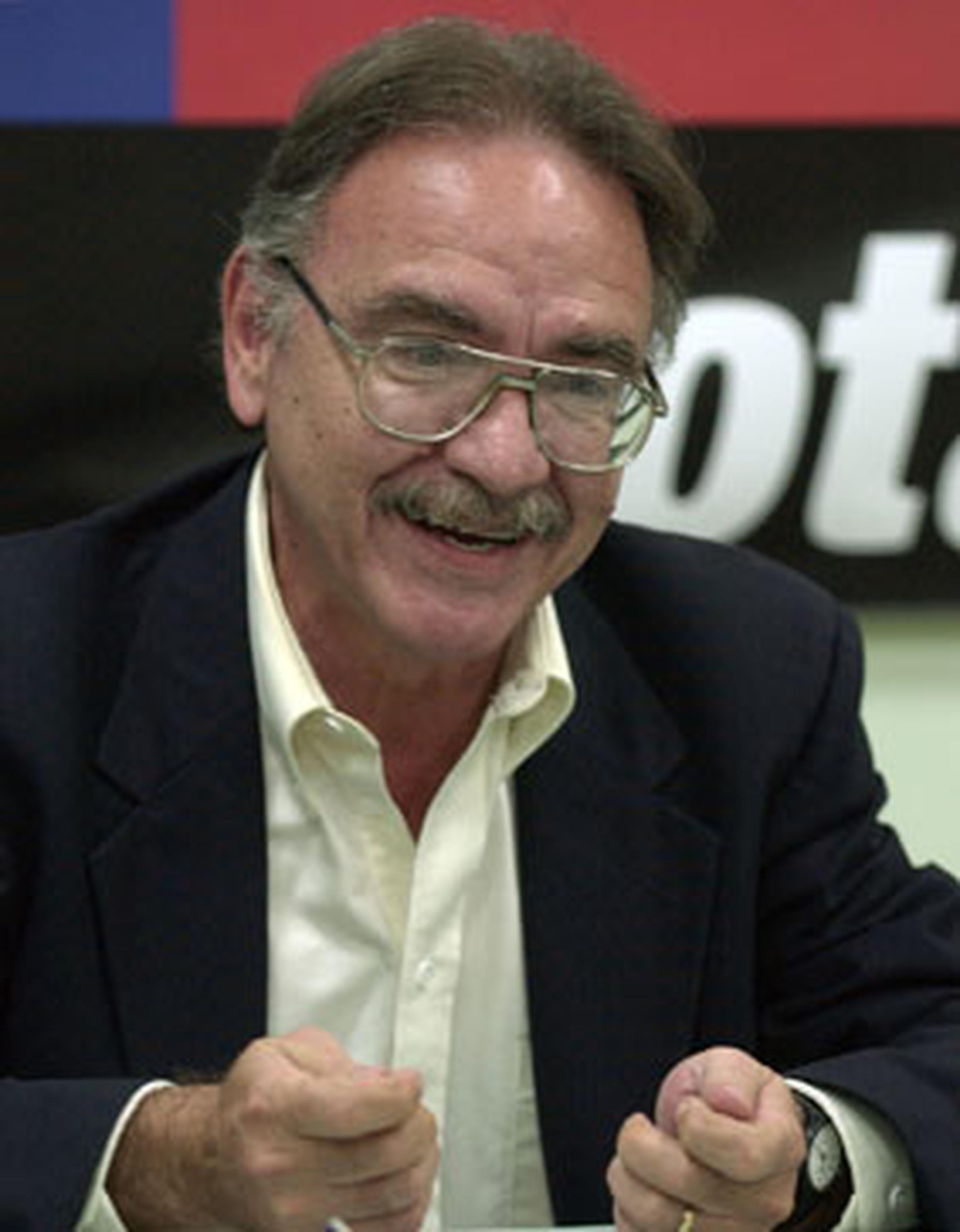

Member of the Puerto Rico Senate from the at-large district
- In office January 2, 2001 – January 2, 2005
- In office January 2, 1989 – January 2, 1993

Personal details
- Party: Puerto Rican Independence Party (PIP)
- Education: University of Puerto Rico at Río Piedras (BA); John F. Kennedy School of Government (MPP); Harvard Law School (JD)
- Profession: Politician; senator; professor; attorney

Fernando Martín García is a Puerto Rican politician and former senator. He was a member of the Senate of Puerto Rico from 1989 to 1993, and then from 2001 to 2005.

== Early years and studies ==
Fernando Martín García finished his elementary and high school at the Colegio San Ignacio de Loyola in San Juan. He then studied at the University of Puerto Rico receiving his bachelor's degree with a major in history in 1969. He then completed his master's degree in public policy from the John F. Kennedy School of Government and his Juris Doctor from Harvard Law School in 1974.

Since 1975, Martín García has worked as a professor of administrative law and ethics responsibility at the University of Puerto Rico School of Law.

== Political career ==
Martín García was candidate for Governor of Puerto Rico for the Puerto Rican Independence Party at the 1984 and 1992 general elections.

At the 1988 elections, Martín García was elected to the Senate of Puerto Rico for the first time. For the 1996 elections, he was a candidate for senator for the District of San Juan, but lost.

Martín García was elected again to the senate at the 2000 general elections. After that term, he ran for mayor of San Juan, but lost to incumbent Jorge Santini.

== International presence and support for independence ==
Martín García has been a supporter of Puerto Rican independence for a long time. He has defended his position in international forums like the United Nations, the Permanent Conference of Political Parties for Latin America, the Latin American Association of Human Rights, and the Socialist International.

Martín García was also one of the lead protesters against the presence of the United States military during the Navy-Vieques protests. As a result, he was arrested for civil disobedience.
