= Víctor García San Inocencio =

Puerto Rican politician

Member of the Puerto Rico House of Representatives from the at-large district
- In office January 2, 1997 – January 2, 2009

Personal details
- Born: February 6, 1958 (age 68) Santurce, Puerto Rico
- Party: PIP
- Education: University of Puerto Rico (BA); University of Puerto Rico School of Law (JD)

Víctor García San Inocencio (born February 6, 1958, in Santurce, San Juan, Puerto Rico) is a lawyer and politician from Puerto Rico who served as Minority Leader in the House of Representatives of Puerto Rico for the Puerto Rican Independence Party from 1997 to 2009. García San Inocencio was known for obtaining the most votes between all candidates aspiring for Representative at-large, regardless of political party, usually obtaining 2–4% more than the second best.
