= Manuel Rodríguez Orellana =

Puerto Rican politician (born 1948)

At-Large Member of the Puerto Rico Senate
- In office 1999–2001

Personal details
- Born: March 7, 1948 (age 78) Río Piedras, Puerto Rico
- Party: Puerto Rican Independence Party (PIP); Puerto Rican Socialist Party (PSP)
- Education: Johns Hopkins University (B.A.); Brown University (M.A.); Boston College Law School (J.D.); Harvard Law School (LL.M.)
- Occupation: Attorney; legislator; lecturer

Manuel Rodríguez Orellana (born March 7, 1948, in Puerto Rico) is a legal scholar, lawyer, lecturer, columnist, published poet and political leader of the Puerto Rican Independence Movement. He is the son of former Dean of the University of Puerto Rico School of Law (1944–1960), Manuel Rodríguez Ramos.

== Academic distinctions ==
Manuel Rodríguez Orellana’s scholarly career included a tenured position as professor of law at Northeastern University School of Law in Boston, Massachusetts. Rodríguez Orellana also served as a professor of law at Inter-American University School of Law in San Juan, Puerto Rico. Furthermore, Rodríguez Orellana was a visiting scholar at Harvard Law School during the mid-1980s. Harking further back, from the 1970s to the present, Manuel Rodríguez Orellana has represented the Puerto Rican Independence Party (PIP) at international summits such as those organized and held by political parties (including dozens of incumbent parties in government) from around the world affiliated to the Socialist International (SI). Manuel Rodríguez Orellana has also served as a key negotiator, diplomat and as speaker before the United Nations (UN), the United States Congress and as an appointed envoy to deal and enter into extensive discussions with U.S. Executive-Committees (summoned and assembled by Presidential Executive Orders hailing from the Bill Clinton and George W. Bush Administrations) charged to deal with Puerto Rico’s political status problem.

== Career ==
Rodríguez Orellana is secretary for North American relations and former senator for the Partido Independentista Puertorriqueño (PIP). He also served as Electoral Commissioner for the PIP during most of the 1990s. Currently, apart from his publicly acclaimed tenure as Secretary for North American Relations for the PIP, Rodríguez Orellana is a member of the executive-decisionmaking body within the PIP’s leadership organism.

Rodríguez Orellana has written extensively about the history and the current problems revolving around Puerto Rico’s political status and the future of that country from an economic, legal, political and sociological perspective. He has held a regular column in Puerto Rico’s only English-language daily, the Pulitzer Prize-winning daily The San Juan Star, as well as in that newspaper’s Spanish-language version.

Rodríguez Orellana has also helped draft PIP strategy and implemented policy regarding relations with various United States Presidents, the United States Congress and the United Nations.

Rodríguez Orellana wrote Por senderos de la descolonización and Después de todo: poemas de noche y de circunstancia.

== See also ==
- Latin American and Caribbean Congress in Solidarity with Puerto Rico's Independence
- Juan Dalmau Ramírez
