= New Progressive Party (Puerto Rico) =

Political party in Puerto Rico

New Progressive Party Partido Nuevo Progresista
- President: Jenniffer González-Colón
- Secretary-General: Jorge Santini
- Vice Presidents: Thomas Rivera Schatz; Johnny Méndez; Rosachely Rivera
- Founder: Luis A. Ferré
- Founded: August 20, 1967; 59 years ago
- Split from: Republican Statehood Party
- Headquarters: San Juan, Puerto Rico
- Youth wing: Juventud Progresista
- Women's wing: Mujeres Progresistas
- Membership (2020): 297,998
- Ideology: Puerto Rican statehood; Social conservatism; Conservatism; Neoliberalism; Factions: Centrism; Liberalism
- Political position: Center-right to right-wing
- Colors: Blue, white
- Seats in the Senate: 19 / 28
- Seats in the House of Representatives: 36 / 53
- Municipalities: 37 / 78
- Seats in the U.S. House: 0 / 1

Website
- Official website

The New Progressive Party (Spanish: Partido Nuevo Progresista, PNP) is a political party in Puerto Rico that advocates for statehood. The PNP is one of the two major parties in Puerto Rico with significant political strength and currently holds the seat of the governor and a majority in both legislative houses.

The party is primarily contrasted by two other political parties: the Popular Democratic Party (PPD), which advocates maintaining the current political status of Puerto Rico as that of an unincorporated territory of the United States with self-government, and the smaller Puerto Rican Independence Party (PIP), which advocates for the independence of Puerto Rico. (Note: Party platform 2012 (in Spanish) p. 248. "El Partido Popular Democrático reafirma que el Estado Libre Asociado es la opción de estatus que mejor representa las aspiraciones del Pueblo de Puerto Rico.") (Note: Party platform 2012 (in Spanish) p. 248 "El Partido Popular Democrático apoya firmemente el desarrollo del Estado Libre Asociado hasta el máximo de autonomía compatible con los principios de unión permanente con los Estados Unidos y la ciudadanía americana de los puertorriqueños. El Partido Popular rechaza cualquier modificación de estatus que se aparte de estos principios y que atente contra nuestra nacionalidad puertorriqueña o que menoscabe nuestra identidad lingüística y cultural.")

In federal politics, members are split, with some party members affiliating with the Republican Party and some with the Democratic Party, although the PNP tends to be seen as more conservative than the PPD overall.

The party traces its history back to 1967. In that year, the Partido Estadista Republicano instructed its members to not participate in a referendum on statehood held that year. Unhappy with the mandate, several dissidents left the Statehood Party and founded the PNP afterwards.

== History ==
=== Foundation ===
The party traces its beginnings to an August, 1967 assembly in a sports complex (which is now known as el Estadio Country Club) in the sector of Country Club, San Juan, Puerto Rico. On January 5, 1968, the party was belatedly certified as an official political group by the State Elections Commission of Puerto Rico. The party had roots in a prior pro-statehood party led by Miguel Angel García Méndez. The incipient party campaigned unsuccessfully in favor of statehood in the Puerto Rico status referendum of 1967, even though the historical pro-statehood Puerto Rican Republican Party decided to boycott that plebiscite. Main party founder, president, and former statehood Republican Party standard-bearer Luis A. Ferré categorized the New Progressive Party as one which would not be aligned to any of the two major U.S. national parties.

Under Luis A. Ferré, the NPP came to power in January 1969, after defeating Luis Negrón López, the gubernatorial candidate from the Popular Democratic Party (PDP) in the November 1968 elections. Smaller vote totals were obtained by the Partido del Pueblo led by Governor Roberto Sánchez Vilella and the candidate from the Puerto Rican Independence Party (PIP), Antonio González. The governing party was saddled by Sánchez Vilella's break-away candidacy, who had feuded with the PPD founder and former Governor Luis Muñoz Marín.

=== 1970s ===
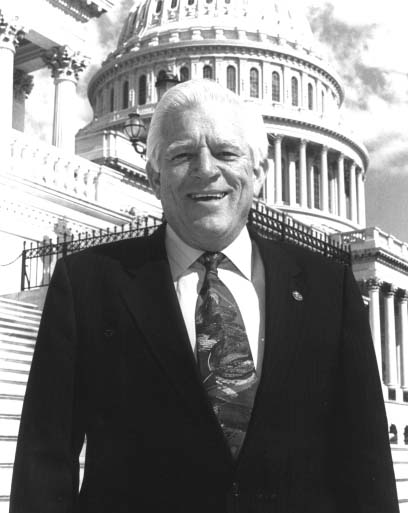
Carlos Romero Barceló, Governor of Puerto Rico (1977–1985)

Four years later, in 1972, Ferré lost to the reunified PDP's candidate, Senate President Rafael Hernández Colón, by the biggest percentual margin since the NPP's founding (7.3%); however, in 1976, under the leadership of San Juan Mayor Carlos Romero Barceló, the NPP returned to power. Romero Barceló would face Hernández Colón three times for the governorship.

=== 1980s ===
In the 1980 general elections, Carlos A. Romero Barceló won reelection by a narrow margin of approximately 3,000 votes. A prominent event during Romero Barceló's term, the Cerro Maravilla incident, would end up overshadowing Romero Barceló's governorship. The incident involved the killing of two young men who had gone to Cerro Maravilla, site of a major communications facility for the island, with the intention of sabotaging the facilities. After arriving at Cerro Maravilla the two men were ambushed and killed by the state police. Initially, it was reported that the two young men had been shot because they resisted arrest; as the investigation progressed, however, it became clear the men had been shot, execution style, while under police custody. The opposition party, the PDP (which was in control of the legislature at the time), organized hearings in which they attempted to prove the whole incident was planned by the administration of Governor Romero Barceló. Further scandals erupted when it became known that an undercover police agent who was with the two men had actually engineered the whole plan. This, combined with the fact that the then-mayor of San Juan, Hernán Padilla, left the party to form his own party (Partido Renovación Puertorriqueña, PRP), helped Hernández Colón get elected to a second non-consecutive term in 1984. In 1988, San Juan Mayor and former Resident Commissioner Baltasar Corrada del Río ran as the NPP candidate for governor but lost the race to Hernández Colón, who won a third term.

=== 1990s ===
The NPP came back to power in 1993 when Pedro Rosselló, a pediatric surgeon who had been its unsuccessful congressional candidate in 1988, became governor by defeating Luis Muñoz Marín's daughter, Senator Victoria Muñoz Mendoza, the PDP candidate for governor.

Rosselló launched an anti-crime campaign known as "Mano dura contra el crimen" ("Strong hand against crime") in which the Puerto Rico National Guard was used to assist the Island police force. During Pedro J. Rosselló's term, a number of large-scale infrastructure projects were undertaken, including the "Tren Urbano" (Metro Rail System), the "Superaqueduct", the construction of the Puerto Rico Convention Center and the Puerto Rico Coliseum. His policies also included a push toward privatization of public entities and free health care for the poor.

He led the NPP in a campaign for Puerto Rican statehood in 1993, in which locally enacted plebiscites were held to consult the Puerto Rican public on their position regarding the political status of the island with the United States. He supported the proposal for a referendum in Puerto Rico to define the political status of the island. However, the bill died in committee in the U.S. Senate. Nevertheless, Rosselló carried out another plebiscite in 1998 which gave electors four options plus a fifth one, "None of the Above". The opposing Popular Democratic Party led a campaign to boycott the plebiscite, charging it was structured to favor the ruling NPP party's statehood goals, and called the electorate to vote for the "None of the Above" option. The boycott was successful, as the None of the Above column garnered more votes than all of the other options. Rosselló, however, argued before Congress that statehood had obtained more votes than any of the other political status options in the plebiscite as he claimed that the fifth option ("None of the Above") was an undefined vote in terms of status.

In the 1996 elections, the NPP candidate, Rosselló, defeated opponent Héctor Luis Acevedo (PDP), the mayor of San Juan at the time, and Representative David Noriega (PIP), for a second term, after obtaining more than one million votes and the largest landslide of any gubernatorial candidate since 1964.

In 1998, the sale of the state-owned Puerto Rico Telephone Company (PRTC) to GTE for $1.9 billion led to a general strike organized by labor unions and backed by opposition forces. Rosselló's popularity along with the NPP's took a hit due to the backlash, as well as to several major corruption cases.

=== 2000s ===
Rosselló term as governor ended after eight years in power in 2001. His period as governor was marked by the Vieques protests and major economic growth due to the coincidence of the emerging Internet. In 2000, Carlos I. Pesquera, Secretary of Transportation under Rosselló, ran for governor. Pre-election polls had him at a considerable advantage over his PDP opponent, San Juan mayor Sila María Calderón. As the election grew closer, Calderón closed the gap as Pesquera's image was harmed by a PDP campaign focusing on corruption under Rosselló's tenure.

It also did not help Pesquera that the Acting US District Attorney Guillermo Gil said in June 2000 (three months before the November 2000 election) "corruption has a name and it is called the New Progressive Party" while announcing a grand jury indictment. The grand jury had accused 18 people — including two mayors from Rosselló's NPP — of running an extortion scheme that skimmed $800,000 in kickbacks from a $56 million government contract. During a news conference, Gil told journalists that the extorted money had ended up in the coffers of the NPP. This and other actions by Gil were object of many ethics complaints to the US Department of Justice by NPP leaders.

In this environment, the NPP lost the 2000 election, losing the Governor's seat, the Resident Commissioner, and the state legislature. This was the first election since its creation that the NPP suffered a vote reduction. Leo Díaz assumed the NPP Presidency, but it was short-lived as Pesquera returned to occupy the position after defeating Díaz.

Turmoil consumed the NPP during the first two years of the 2001–2005 term. The Secretary of Education, under the Rossello's administration, Víctor Fajardo, was charged and convicted by federal agencies of appropriating millions of federal funds directed to the Education Department. The former House Speaker and Republican National Committee Man, Edison Misla Aldarondo was also charged with extortion by the US Attorney's Office, and was forced to resign. In an ironic turn of events, NPP figures charged with federal corruption crimes were also charged with corruption by the Puerto Rico Justice Department using new anti-corruption state laws that the NPP had enacted. In 2001, Calderon named a Blue Ribbon Committee that was dedicated to investigate government transactions under Rossello's two terms.

==== 2003 NPP primaries for Governor ====
In July 2002, several of the party's leaders were involved in an incident at the Office of Women's Affairs. Pesquera led a group of pro-statehood advocates and the press into the government office whose administrator had refused to display the American flag alongside the flag of Puerto Rico, as required by law. A jury acquitted Pesquera and other followers of any wrongdoing.

In March 2003, Rosselló, who had been living in the Commonwealth of Virginia, returned to the island, responding to the many calls and visits he received from prominent citizens and politicians. Rosselló subsequently defeated Pesquera in the NPP primary for the gubernatorial nomination.

==== 2004 General Elections ====
Rosselló's prior administration was repeatedly painted as corrupt, while his PDP opponent (Calderón chose not to run for re-election), Resident Commissioner Aníbal Acevedo Vilá (PDP) was initially behind in the polls. After his performance in televised debates, Acevedo's campaign gained momentum, aided in part by the favorable press he received from the island media outlets. In pre-election polls, Rosselló led by double digits, but ultimately Rosselló lost by some 3,000 votes (1,200 votes went as write-in for Carlos Pesquera) proving that once again that corruption matters to Puerto Rican voters. Rosselló challenged the electoral results alleging that split ticket votes, which had always been counted before, were now illegal. After a lengthy court battle decided by the United States Court of Appeals for the First Circuit, Acevedo Vila was certified as governor.

==== Senate conflict ====
As 2005 began, Rosselló became a Senator for the Arecibo district after Senator Víctor Loubriel resigned from the seat to which he'd been elected, effectively gaining a seat for which he did not run. Thus started a struggle between Senate President Kenneth McClintock and Rosselló for control of the Senate Presidency. The dispute ended in a stalemate as McClintock refused to leave the position, a stance respected by the PDP minority senators and five other NPP senators. This led to the expulsion from the party of McClintock as well as two of the NPP senators who backed him, a matter which led McClintock to file suit in San Juan Superior Court, winning the case, which was confirmed by the Puerto Rico Supreme Court in a 5–1 ruling. The infighting ended when Rosselló was defeated in the 2008 primary and when McClintock co-chaired Sen. Hillary Clinton's successful Democratic primary campaign and helped lead her to a record-setting 68–32% victory in the waning days of her bid for the Democratic nomination.

==== 2008 NPP primaries for Governor ====
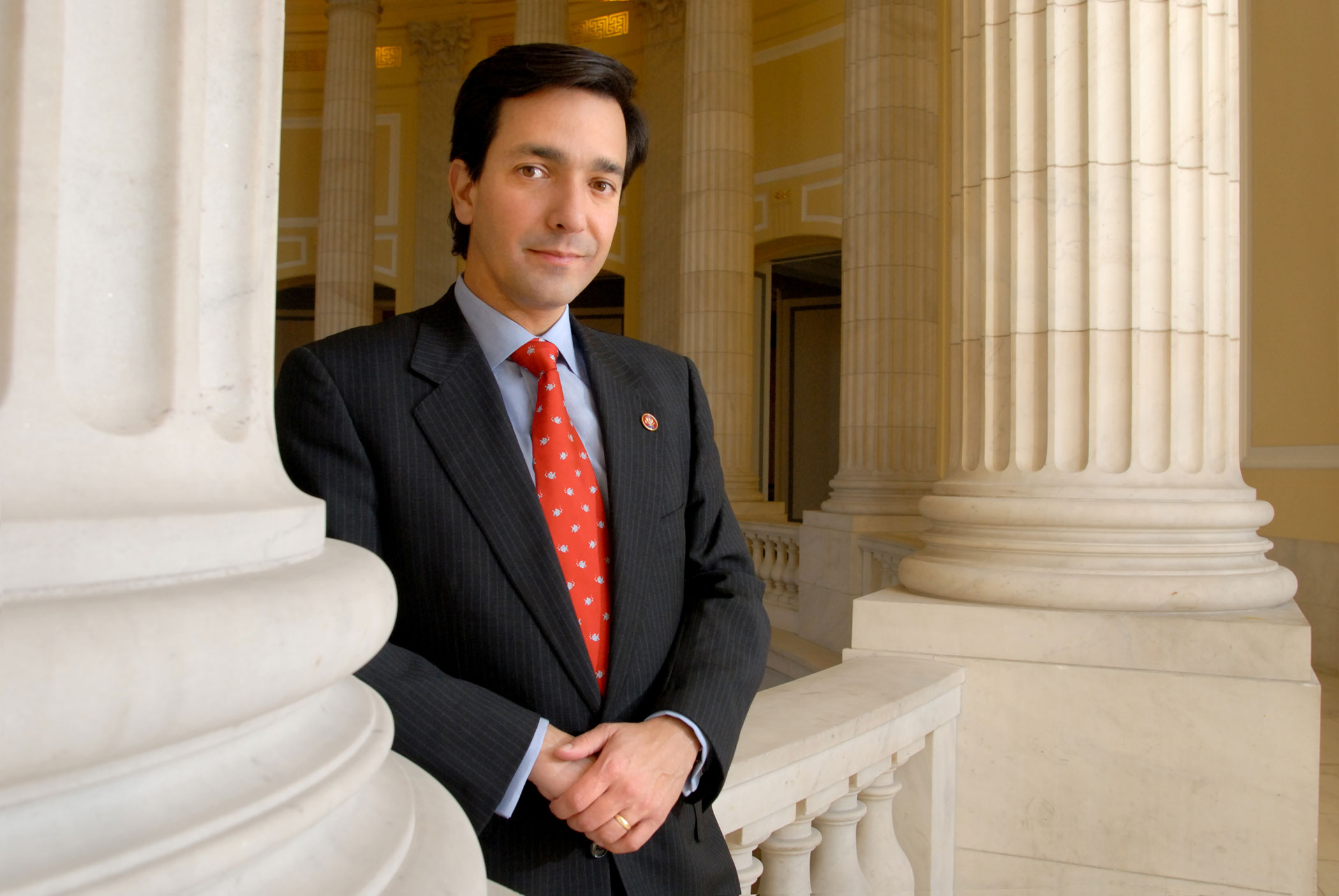
Luis G. Fortuño, Governor of Puerto Rico (2009–2013)

On March 7, 2007, Rosselló stated that he was no longer interested in the Senate Presidency and then focused his attention in preventing Resident Commissioner Luis Fortuño from winning the March 2008 gubernatorial primary, and allowed his name to be placed in nomination for the party's gubernatorial primary. McClintock and four other senators won in San Juan Superior Court a suit to nullify the sanctions and expulsions that the party leadership has levied against them. The Puerto Rico Supreme Court confirmed the lower court decision by a 5-to-1 vote. As a result, McClintock and his supporters were recognized as NPP members and free to run under the party banner. Shortly after the primary polls closed on March 9, 2008, Pedro Rosselló conceded the victory to Luis Fortuño after a large margin of votes in favor of his opponent in the NPP party primaries for the presidency of the party and gubernatorial nomination. Rosselló admitted defeat even before the votes were completely tallied claiming Fortuño as the next candidate of the PNP party. On March 10, 2008, Rosselló sent the media a written statement regarding his future in which he confirmed he will be retiring from active politics and will not be campaigning for any candidate, however he would finish his term as senator for the Arecibo District, which he did.

===== Primary backlash =====
Most of Rosselló's supporters were elected in the primary and endorsed Fortuño as their candidate for governor. However, several prominent NPP members demonstrated strong opposition to Fortuño's candidacy and victory.

Ramírez was a candidate for Resident Commissioner in the primaries and was openly supporting Rosselló. She lost to Fortuño's candidate, Pedro Pierluisi, and to another Rosselló supporter who was also defeated, former Senate President, Charlie Rodríguez. When Ramírez was asked by the media if she will vote for Fortuño, she replied "My vote is secret".

Another strong voice against Fortuño was NPP former President Leo Díaz. Díaz accused Fortuño and his wife of having ties to PDP law firms and to colonialist interests. At a November 4, 2007, rally called "Con Fuerza para Vencer" (With the Strength to Win), Díaz said, "In this primary the life of this party is in jeopardy. The other candidate, Fortuño, isn't a real statehood defender! He should explain why he has ties with PDP's law firms and why the colonialist special interests are financing his campaign[...]". He has since rejoined party activities and chairs Santini's 2012 reelection efforts.

San Juan mayor Jorge Santini also made strong statements against Fortuño during the primary campaign, as he supported Rosselló. He said that Fortuño wasn't a "full-time leader" and that he "made arrangements with other causes". He subsequently campaigned for Fortuño, both in 2008 as well as 2012.

==== 2008 elections ====
On November 4, 2008, the NPP retained and expanded super-majorities in the Legislative Assembly, and won both the Resident Commissioner and Governor race by a landslide.

=== 2010s ===
==== 2012 election and plebiscite ====
While Gov. Fortuño failed to win reelection on November 6, 2012, his running mate Pedro R. Pierluisi Urrutia became Puerto Rico's top vote-getter. In a separate matter, in 2012, the NPP won by wide margins the two questions posed in a separate political status plebiscite ballot. Fifty-four percent rejected the continuation of the current territorial political relationship with the United States while 61% of those choosing another political status voted for statehood.

==== 2016 election ====
On November 8, 2016, the NPP's gubernatorial candidate Ricardo Rosselló beat the PDP's candidate, former Secretary of State David Bernier, to become the Governor of Puerto Rico. In the same election, Jenniffer González became the new, and first female, Resident Commissioner of Puerto Rico. The New Progressive Party became the majority in the Legislative Assembly by winning 21 seats of the Senate and 34 seats of the House of Representatives. However, the PDP retained a majority of the mayoralty races in the island, with a total of 45 out of 78 municipalities. The New Progressive Party (PNP) won a total of 33.

=== 2020s ===
==== 2020 election ====
On September 24, 2020, Jorge Báez Pagán became the first openly gay member of the House of Representatives in the island's history. In January 2021, the new delegation of 21 PNP elected officials pledged to not increase taxes citing an unemployment rate of 14% in Puerto Rico. Instead governor Pierluisi opted for cuts in pensions to balance the budget, which was received with protests from 18 unions in Puerto Rico. The protestors rather favoured Bill 120, proposed by PNP representative Lourdes Ramos, to guarantee a "dignified retirement".

==== 2024 election ====
In the 2024 Puerto Rico gubernatorial election, the party's candidate Jenniffer González-Colón was elected Governor. The party campaigned for statehood in the 2024 Puerto Rican status referendum.

== Electoral history ==
=== In legislative elections ===
==== House of Representatives ====
House of Representatives
Election year	# of overall seats won	+/–
1968	25 / 51	▲25
1972	15 / 54	▼10
1976	33 / 51	▲18
1980	25 / 51	▼8
1984	16 / 51	▼9
1988	15 / 53	▼1
1992	36 / 53	▲21
1996	37 / 54	▲1
2000	20 / 51	▼17
2004	32 / 51	▲12
2008	37 / 51	▲5
2012	23 / 51	▼14
2016	34 / 51	▲11
2020	21 / 51	▼13
2024	36 / 51	▲15

Senate
Election year	# of overall seats won	+/–
1968	12 / 27	▲12
1972	8 / 29	▼4
1976	14 / 27	▲6
1980	12 / 27	▼2
1984	8 / 27	▼4
1988	8 / 27	Steady
1992	20 / 29	▲12
1996	19 / 28	▼1
2000	19 / 28	Steady
2004	18 / 27	▼1
2008	22 / 27	▲4
2012	8 / 27	▼14
2016	21 / 30	▲13
2020	10 / 27	▼12
2024	20 / 27	▲10

=== Gubernatorial Elections ===
Election year	PNP Candidate	Votes	Vote %	+/-	Outcome of election
1968	Luis A. Ferré	400,815	43.6 / 100	▲43.6%	Won
1972	Luis A. Ferré	563,609	43.4 / 100	▼0.2%	Lost
1976	Carlos Romero Barceló	703,968	48.3 / 100	▲4.9%	Won
1980	Carlos Romero Barceló	759,926	47.2 / 100	▼1.1%	Won
1984	Carlos Romero Barceló	768,959	44.6 / 100	▼2.6%	Lost
1988	Baltasar Corrada del Río	820,342	45.8 / 100	▲1.2%	Lost
1992	Pedro Rosselló	938,969	49.9 / 100	▲4.1%	Won
1996	Pedro Rosselló	1,006,331	51.1 / 100	▲1.2%	Won
2000	Carlos Pesquera	919,194	45.7 / 100	▼5.4%	Lost
2004	Pedro Rosselló	959,737	48.2 / 100	▲2.5%	Lost
2008	Luis Fortuño	1,025,965	52.8 / 100	▲4.6%	Won
2012	Luis Fortuño	884,775	47.1 / 100	▼5.7%	Lost
2016	Ricardo Rosselló	649,791	41.8 / 100	▼5.3%	Won
2020	Pedro Pierluisi	406,830	32.9 / 100	▼8.8%	Won
2024	Jenniffer González-Colón	447,962	39.4 / 100	▲7.5%	Won

=== Resident Commissioner Elections ===
Election year	PNP Candidate	Votes	Vote %	+/-	Outcome of election
1968	Jorge Luis Córdova	400,815	43.6 / 100	▲43.6%	Won
1972	Jorge Luis Córdova	563,609	43.4 / 100	▼0.2%	Lost
1976	Baltasar Corrada del Río	703,968	48.3 / 100	▲4.9%	Won
1980	Baltasar Corrada del Río	760,484	47.7 / 100	▼1.1%	Won
1984	Nelson Femadas	769,951	45.3 / 100	▼2.4%	Lost
1988	Pedro Rosselló	824,879	46.6 / 100	▲1.3%	Lost
1992	Carlos Romero Barceló	908,067	48.6 / 100	▲2.0%	Won
1996	Carlos Romero Barceló	973,654	50.0 / 100	▲1.4%	Won
2000	Carlos Romero Barceló	905,690	45.6 / 100	▼4.6%	Lost
2004	Luis Fortuño	956,828	48.8 / 100	▲3.2%	Won
2008	Pedro Pierluisi	1,010,304	52.7 / 100	▲3.9%	Won
2012	Pedro Pierluisi	905,066	48.4 / 100	▼4.3%	Won
2016	Jenniffer González	713,605	48.8 / 100	▲0.4%	Won
2020	Jenniffer González	490,273	40.8 / 100	▼8.0%	Won
2024	William Villafañe	378,082	35.0 / 100	▼5.8%	lost

== Affiliation with national parties ==
Three NPP gubernatorial candidates registered nationally as Republicans (Luis A. Ferré, Baltasar Corrada and Luis G. Fortuño) while five NPP gubernatorial candidates registered nationally as Democrats (Carlos Romero Barceló, Carlos Pesquera, Pedro Pierluisi, Pedro Rosselló and Ricardo Rosselló). When Fortuño was governor, his top administration officials were also split in national politics. His last chief of staff, Miguel Romero, and his Secretary of State (and first in line of succession), Kenneth McClintock, are Democrats, while his last Attorney General, Guillermo Somoza, is a Republican. House NPP Leader Johnny Méndez and Senate Majority Leader Tomas Rivera Schatz are Republicans. The current Governor of Puerto Rico is Republican Jenniffer González-Colón.

== Party logo ==
The party is strongly associated with the color blue in Puerto Rico because of its logo. Since the logo features a palm tree, many Puerto Ricans call the NPP "La Palma". The use of the coconut palm tree as a symbol by the PNP persists to this day.

The logo's original version consisted of a light blue palm tree, partially encircled by words in a semicircle (the exact color hue for the logo being that of the United Nations flag, as a result of a personal request from party founder Luis A. Ferré). The original logo had the party's name surrounding it; eventually, the words "estadidad, seguridad, progreso" ("statehood, security, progress" in English) substituted the party name. The logo later enclosed the palm tree in a blue oval and reversed its colors. The tonality of blue used in the newer logo was eventually changed to a deep navy blue, as to liken it to that of the canton of the United States' flag.

In 2014, the party approved the new logo, which now includes the word "Igualdad" (equality).

== Party leaders ==
=== Party presidents ===
- 1967–1974: Luis A. Ferré
- 1974–1987: Carlos Romero Barceló
- 1987–1988: Baltasar Corrada del Río
- 1988–1989: Ramón Luis Rivera
- 1989–1991: Carlos Romero Barceló
- 1991–1999: Pedro Rosselló
- 1999–2000: Carlos Pesquera
- 2000–2001: Norma Burgos
- 2001–2001: Leonides Díaz Urbina
- 2001–2003: Carlos Pesquera
- 2003–2008: Pedro Rosselló
- 2008–2013: Luis Fortuño
- 2013–2016: Pedro Pierluisi
- 2016–2019: Ricardo Rosselló
- 2019–2020: Thomas Rivera Schatz
- 2020–2024: Pedro Pierluisi
- 2024–present: Jenniffer González

=== Gubernatorial nominees ===
- 1968: Luis A. Ferré, won
- 1972: Luis A. Ferré, lost
- 1976: Carlos Romero Barceló, won
- 1980: Carlos Romero Barceló, won
- 1984: Carlos Romero Barceló, lost
- 1988: Baltasar Corrada del Río, lost
- 1992: Pedro Rosselló, won
- 1996: Pedro Rosselló, won
- 2000: Carlos Pesquera, lost
- 2004: Pedro Rosselló, lost
- 2008: Luis Fortuño, won
- 2012: Luis Fortuño, lost
- 2016: Ricardo Rosselló, won
- 2020: Pedro Pierluisi, won
- 2024: Jenniffer González-Colón, won

== See also ==
- List of political parties in Puerto Rico
- Politics of Puerto Rico
- 51-star flag
