= 2003 Popular Democratic Party of Puerto Rico primaries =

Popular Democratic Party primaries, 2003
- November 9, 2003

The 2003 Popular Democratic Party primaries were the primary elections by which voters of the Popular Democratic Party (PPD) chose its nominees for various political offices of Puerto Rico for the 2004 general elections. They were held on November 9, 2003. Incumbent Resident Commissioner Aníbal Acevedo Vilá faced no opposition for his candidacy, making him the official candidate for the elections.

== Candidates ==
=== Senate ===
==== At-large ====
- Eudaldo Báez Galib
- Severo Colberg Toro
- Antonio Fas Alzamora
- Velda González de Modestti
- Sila Mari González Calderón
- Juan Eugenio Hernández Mayoral
- Alfredo Freddy López
- Sergio Peña Clos
- Armando “Armandito” Torres

==== District ====
The Popular Democratic Party held primaries on only 6 of the 8 senatorial districts.

===== San Juan =====
- Victor de la Cruz
- José Ortíz Dalliot
- Margarita Ostolaza

===== Arecibo =====
- Nelson Cintrón
- Lucy Molinari
- María Elena Perez
- Francis Rivera
- Julio Rodríguez
- Rafael Rodríguez

===== Mayagüez-Aguadilla =====
- Rafael Irizarry
- Taty Jiménez
- Luis Loperena
- Jorge Ramos Vélez
- Esther Soto

===== Ponce =====
- Modesto Agosto Alicea
- Bruno Ramos
- Jean Rodríguez Pazo

===== Guayama =====
- Jose L. Colón Sánchez
- Cirilo Tirado Rivera
- Angel M. Rodríguez

===== Carolina =====
- Juan Cancel Alegría
- Yasmín Mejías
- Melba Rivera

=== House of Representatives ===
==== At-large ====
- Jorge Colberg Toro
- Héctor Ferrer
- Ferdinand Perez
- Julia Torres
- Luis Vega Ramos
- Jose Eligio Velez
- Carlos Vizcarrondo

==== District ====
The Popular Democratic Party held primaries on 22 of the 40 representative districts.

===== District 1 =====
- Herminio Pagán
- José Segui

===== District 3 =====
- Modesto Estrada
- Carlos Morales

===== District 7 =====
- Lara Aponte
- Adalberto Pérez

===== District 9 =====
- Manolo Díaz
- Reynaldo Díaz
- Luis Hernández

===== District 10 =====
- Marcos Berríos
- Angel Cabrera
- Angel Díaz

===== District 12 =====
- Eggie Negrón
- Raúl Negrón
- Freddie Ramos
- Rubén Soto

===== District 13 =====
- Eduardo Martínez
- Joaquín Tirado

===== District 14 =====
- Ramón Dasta
- Yamil Juarbe

===== District 15 =====
- Rafael Reichard
- José "Tato" Ruíz

===== District 16 =====
- Sergio Ortíz
- José Rodríguez

===== District 17 =====
- Milton Morales
- Lourdes Ríos
- Félix Vega

===== District 18 =====
- Tony Méndez
- Elvis Morales
- Miguel Ruíz

===== District 19 =====
- Charlie Hernández
- Rafael Rivera

===== District 20 =====
- Evelyn Alicea
- Carlos Bianchi Angleró
- Jesús Casiano
- Monchy Ramos
- Israel Rivera
- Eduardo Rosado

===== District 22 =====
- Otilio Plaza
- Ramón Ruíz

===== District 24 =====
- Roberto Cruz
- Luis Farinacci

===== District 28 =====
- Che Díaz
- Luisito Figueroa
- Epifanio Galarza
- Honis Fuentes Villanueva
- Cheo Rivera

===== District 29 =====
- José Castrodad
- José Rodríguez
- Víctor Suárez

===== District 30 =====
- Carlos Picart
- Ricky Valero

===== District 33 =====
- Jesús Collazo
- Sara Rosario

===== District 34 =====
- Orlando de Jesús
- Luis A. Ortíz
- David Sánchez

===== District 38 =====
- Pedrito Rodríguez
- Raymond Rivera

=== Mayors ===
The Popular Democratic Party held primaries on 19 of 78 municipalities.

==== Aguada ====
- Harry Luis
- Miguelito Ruíz

==== Aguadilla ====
- Agustín Méndez
- David Villanueva

==== Aibonito ====
- J.A. "Bertito" Díaz
- Edgardo Rodríguez

==== Arecibo ====
- Frankie Hernández
- Ervin Sánchez

==== Arroyo ====
- Carmencita González
- Blanca López

==== Cabo Rojo ====
- Emilio Carlo Acosta
- Nelson Vincenty

==== Canóvanas ====
- Junior Meléndez
- Ermelindo Sánchez

==== Cataño ====
- Jorge Díaz
- Félix Fuentes

==== Hatillo ====
- Aníbal Gerena
- José A. Rodríguez Cruz

==== Hormigueros ====
- Pedro García Figueroa
- Luis Angel

==== Humacao ====
- Orlando Rodríguez
- Marcelo Trujillo
- Ramón Iván Vega

==== Lajas ====
- César Corales
- Marcos "Turin" Irizarry

==== Loíza ====
- Irma Delgado Arroyo
- Virgilio Escobar
- Julito Osorio

==== Morovis ====
- Francisco Rodríguez
- Mañy Rosario

==== Salinas ====
- José Díaz Rivera
- Abraham López

==== San Juan ====
- Eduardo Bhatia
- Roberto Vigoreaux

==== Santa Isabel ====
- Ricky Mercado
- Raúl Pérez Ramírez
- Sánchez

==== Toa Alta ====
- Rafael López
- Samuel Medina

==== Vega Alta ====
- Colón
- Rafael Martínez

== Results ==
=== Senate ===
==== At-large ====
| Candidate | Popular vote | Percentage |
|---|---|---|
| Juan Eugenio Hernández Mayoral | 226,300 | 16.65% |
| Sila Mari González Calderón | 219,748 | 16.17 |
| Antonio Fas Alzamora | 198,237 | 14.58 |
| Velda González de Modestti | 160,883 | 11.84 |
| Eudaldo Báez Galib | 154,600 | 11.37 |
| Severo Colberg Toro | 135,579 | 9.97 |
| Armandito Torres | 107,438 | 7.90 |
| Sergio Peña Clos | 96,860 | 7.13 |
| Alfredo Freddy López | 53,246 | 3.92 |
| Others | 6,416 | 0.47 |

=== House of Representatives ===
==== At-large ====
| Candidate | Popular vote | Percentage |
|---|---|---|
| Ferdinand Pérez | 221,216 | 17.05% |
| Jorge Colberg Toro | 202,013 | 15.57 |
| Héctor Ferrer | 197,048 | 15.18 |
| Carlos Vizcarrondo Irizarry | 195,505 | 15.06 |
| Julia Torres | 186,459 | 14.37 |
| José Eligio Vélez | 153,317 | 11.81 |
| Luis Vega Ramos | 133,520 | 10.29 |
| Others | 8,747 | 0.67 |

== See also ==
- New Progressive Party primaries, 2003
