= Carlos Díaz Olivo =

Puerto Rican academic

- Born: Carlos Eduardo Díaz Olivo; San Juan, Puerto Rico
- Education: University of Puerto Rico (BBA); University of Puerto Rico School of Law (JD); Harvard Law School (LLM)
- Occupations: Attorney, professor, politician, political analyst
- Political party: New Progressive Party (PNP)

Carlos Eduardo Díaz Olivo is a Puerto Rican attorney, professor of law, former politician, and political analyst.

== Early years and education ==
Carlos Díaz Olivo was born in San Juan, Puerto Rico. He completed a Bachelor's degree in Business Administration with a major in Accounting from the University of Puerto Rico. After certifying himself as a Certified Public Accountant, Díaz Olivo entered the University of Puerto Rico School of Law where he graduated with the highest GPA of his class.

After becoming an attorney, Díaz Olivo worked as a law clerk to then-President of the Supreme Court of Puerto Rico, José Trías Monge. After this, the University of Puerto Rico granted Díaz Olivo a scholarship to continue his studies at Harvard, where he obtained a Master's degree in law.

Upon his return to Puerto Rico, he became a member of the faculty of the University of Puerto Rico teaching Business Administration and Law.

== Political career ==
Díaz Olivo ran for mayor of San Juan in the city's 1992 mayoral election. Running under the New Progressive Party (PNP), he was narrowly defeated by Héctor Luis Acevedo, from the Popular Democratic Party (PPD).

== Public service ==
Díaz Olivo was later appointed as Executive Director of the Puerto Rico Ports Authority. He has also served as legal adviser for several municipalities of the island and to the Legislative Assembly of Puerto Rico. As such, he coordinated the efforts that led to the approval of the Internal Revenues Code of 1994, the General Law of Corporations of 1995, and the Law of Commercial Transactions of 1996.

He also served as part of the Transition Committee of Governor-elect Aníbal Acevedo Vilá after the 2004 general elections.

== Career as analyst ==
Díaz Olivo frequently appears as a political analyst in Puerto Rican radio, newspapers, and television. From 2003 to 2005, he hosted a radio show in WKAQ 580 called WKAQ Analiza along Luis Pabón Roca. In mid-2007, both Díaz Olivo and Pabón Roca joined Univision Radio. Since then, they've been hosting the daily show WKAQ Analiza.
