= Jarabo =

Jarabo is a surname. Notable people with the surname include:

- Alberto Jarabo Payá, Spanish lawyer and politician
- Altaír Jarabo (born 1986), Mexican actress and model
- José María Jarabo (1923–1959), Spanish spree killer
- José Neira Jarabo (1906–1941), Spanish anarchist
- Ronny Jarabo (1940–2025), Puerto Rican politician
