= Estadistas Unidos =

Puerto Rican political organization

Estadistas Unidos was a non-partisan organization created by Luis A. Ferré in January, 1967 after the Statehood Republican Party (SRP), of which he was its long-time gubernatorial candidate, met at the San Jerónimo Hilton hotel in San Juan, Puerto Rico and refused to defend the option of becoming a US state in the upcoming July 27 political status plebiscite convened by the pro-status quo Popular Democratic Party (PDP)-dominated Legislature.

Secretly meeting at the Puerto Rico Bar Association (Colegio de Abogados de Puerto Rico) headquarters, Estadistas Unidos was organized in weeks and, against overwhelming odds, was able to launch Puerto Rico's first modern, media-based political campaign which resulted in a dramatic increase in votes for US statehood (39%) in the plebiscite, in spite of the electoral boycott called for by the Statehood Republican Party.

In addition to Ferré, other leaders of Estadistas Unidos included future Governor Carlos Romero Barceló, future San Juan Mayor Hernán Padilla, future Senator José Menéndez Monroig, and future Senator Justo Méndez. Among statehood leaders who remained loyal to the SRP were party president Miguel A. García Méndez, future House Speaker Pro Tem José Granados and future Senate Vice President Orlando Parga, Jr.

On August 20, 1967, organization leaders met at a basketball arena in Carolina, Puerto Rico for the purpose of dissolving the organization, which they did, but immediately approved a motion to found a new political party, which would be known as the New Progressive Party (NPP). Estadistas Unidos is consequently deemed to be the precursor of the NPP. The NPP won the next general election and elected Ferré as the first pro-statehood governor, breaking the PDP's 28-year-long stranglehold on political power.
