= Jorge Colberg Toro =

Puerto Rican politician (born 1965)

At-Large Member of the Puerto Rico House of Representatives
- In office February 26, 2003 – January 26, 2013
- Succeeded by: Luisa Gándara

Personal details
- Born: October 7, 1965 (age 60) Río Piedras, Puerto Rico
- Party: Popular Democratic Party (PPD)
- Spouse: Ivonne Vilanova Morales
- Children: Jorge Ernesto; Daniel Felipe
- Education: Interamerican University of Puerto Rico (BA, MPP)

Jorge Colberg Toro (born October 7, 1965) is a Puerto Rican politician. He served as a member of the Puerto Rico House of Representatives from 2003 to 2013. He also was Secretary for Public Affairs for Governors Sila M. Calderon and Alejandro García Padilla and Secretary General of the Popular Democratic Party (PDP). He is a government and Public Policy College Professor at the Interamerican University of Puerto Rico and the Public Policy Institute of the Rafael Hernandez Colon Library Foundation. He also is a political, legislative and government consultant, speechwriter and a television and radio political analyst.

== Early years and studies ==
Jorge Colberg Toro was born in Río Piedras. His parents are Severo Colberg Ramírez, a former speaker of the House of Representatives, and Eva Toro Franquiz, a college professor and former deputy student dean at the University of Puerto Rico. His older brother, Severo, was also a member of the House of Representatives from 1993 to 2004. Colberg Toro holds a Summa Cum Laude (4.0 GPA) master's degree in government and public policy from the Interamerican University of Puerto Rico, Metropolitan Campus and has a Magna Cum Laude (3.80 GPA) bachelor's degree in political science and humanistic studies from the Inter-American University. He holds also an executive certificate from the Executive Program for Government Officials from the Ibero-American Institute of Cities and the Harvard Kennedy School. At present, Professor Colberg Toro is working on his PhD thesis about Puerto Rico-USA political relationship and fiscal crisis in the political science, public administration and international relations doctoral program at the Complutense University of Madrid.

== Political career ==
From 1989 to 1996, Colberg Toro served as special advisor, director of programming and press secretary of then-Mayor of San Juan, Héctor Luis Acevedo. During that period, he received the Felisa Rincón de Gautier Award for distinguished public servant in 1995. The next year, he was appointed as Press Secretary for the Popular Democratic Party (PDP). He also worked as advisor in communications and politics from 1997 to 2001.

In 2001, Colberg was appointed director of the Public Integrity Commission of the Senate of Puerto Rico, and executive director of the Joint Commission on the Comptroller's Special Reports. That summer, Colberg also served as Public Affairs Adviser for Governor Sila M. Calderón. In November 2001, Calderón also appointed Colberg as Secretary General of the PDP. She also named him as Secretary of Public Affairs for the Government in 2002.

In January 2003, Colberg was called to fill a vacancy at the Puerto Rico House of Representatives. He was sworn on February 26, 2003. During that term, he was the Chairman of the Public Integrity Committee, among others.

In 2003, Colberg Toro officially ran for Representative at the PDP primaries, and was the second candidate with most votes. He was elected in 2004 as a Representative At-large with 134,334 votes. Colberg was reelected again in 2008 and 2012.

On January 9, 2013, Governor Alejandro García Padilla announced that Colberg would serve as Secretary of Public Affairs, thus relinquishing his seat in the House of Representatives. His resignation was effective on January 26, 2013. After two years in office, on July 1, 2015, Governor Garcia-Padilla appointed Colberg, for second time, as Secretary General of the PDP.

During 2008 and 2016 presidential elections in the United States, Colberg was a delegate for Hillary Clinton national committee and the Democratic National Convention. He also was the political director for the Popular Democratic Party delegation for Hillary Clinton's Campaign that won both Puerto Rico's primaries.

Since January 2017, Colberg is in private sector as a political, legislative and government affairs consultant. Since 2017, he also is a speechwriter, communication consultant and strategist. In 2017, he host a radio program with NotiUno Radio Group and he also host a TV and Radio program with Spanish Broadcast System (SBS) as a political and government analyst. He was also a host of a radio program in Radio Isla network and also, he is part of the TV show, Jugando Pelota Dura, the most important political and government policies analysis in the island media.

Colberg wrote two books, the first one, "Agenda de Cambios" (Agenda for Change) about political history of the PDP and "Pacto de Futuro" (Compact for the Future) about the future of the Commonwealth as the best political option for the people of Puerto Rico. Colberg also is a featured columnist for El Nuevo Dia, El Vocero and Metro newspapers. He was a College Professor in the master's degree Government and Public Policy program at the Interamerican University of Puerto Rico and in the Political Science bachelor's degree program. At present, he is the Academic Director of the new Rafael Hernandez Colon Foundation-EDP University Public Policy Institute, and he also worked as the Public Policy Advisor to the President of the Senate of the Commonwealth of Puerto Rico.

Professor Colberg-Toro is married to Ivonne Vilanova Morales and they have two sons, both are attorneys: Jorge E. Colberg-Vilanova and Daniel Colberg-Vilanova.
