= 1984 San Juan, Puerto Rico, mayoral election =

- November 6, 1984
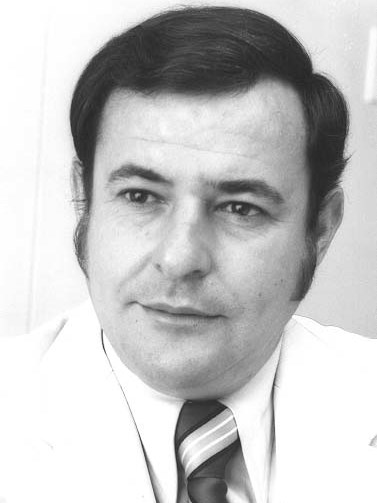

Nominee	Baltasar Corrada del Río	Victoria Muñoz Mendoza
Party	New Progressive	Popular Democratic
Alliance	Democratic	Democratic
Popular vote	105,118	96,857
Percentage	48.35%	44.55%
Mayor before election
Hernán Padilla
New Progressive
Elected mayor
Baltasar Corrada del Río
New Progressive

San Juan, Puerto Rico, held an election for mayor on November 6, 1984. It was held as part of the 1984 Puerto Rican general election. It saw the election of Baltasar Corrada del Río, a member of the New Progressive Party.

== Nominees ==
- Baltasar Corrada del Río (New Progressive Party), resident commissioner of Puerto Rico
- Luis Pío Sánchez Longo (Puerto Rican Independence Party)
- Victoria Muñoz Mendoza (Popular Democratic Party)
- Luis Batista Salas (Puerto Rican Renewal Party)

== Results ==
San Juan mayoral election
Party	Candidate	Votes	%
New Progressive	Baltasar Corrada del Río	105,118	48.35
Popular Democratic	Victoria Muñoz Mendoza	96,857	44.55
Independence	Luis Pío Sánchez Longo	8,304	3.82
Puerto Rican Renewal Party	Luis Batista Salas	7,152	3.29
Total votes		217,431	100
