= Puerto Rico Statehood Commission =

The Puerto Rico Statehood Commission was a grassroots non-partisan organization dedicated to research and education on Puerto Rico statehood.

Founded by then Rep. José Granados in 1981, the organization operated until 1986 and included among its leaders a wide array of prominent statehooders, such as attorney Zaida Hernández, who subsequently served as House Speaker and is currently an appellate court judge, attorney Nélida Jiménez Velázquez, also an appellate judge, then Senator Oreste Ramos, Jr., Sol Luis Descartes, a former Treasury Secretary under PDP Governor Luis Muñoz Marín, current Secretary of State Kenneth McClintock and attorney Luis Dávila Colón, currently Puerto Rico's most prominent political analyst.

Headquartered in a building near Puerto Rico's Capitol Building, the organization graduated over 8,000 statehooders from every municipality in Puerto Rico who took a ten-week-long preparatory course on Puerto Rico statehood. Many of these graduates served as instructors in simultaneous neighborhood meetings that at times attracted over 60,000 attendees the same night.

Jenniffer Gonzalez and Ricardo Rosselló were active in the commission in 2016.
