= José Granados =

Puerto Rican politician

At-Large Member of the Puerto Rico House of Representatives
- In office 1972–1988
- In office 1992–1999

Majority Leader of the Puerto Rico House of Representatives
- In office 1978–1982
- Preceded by: David Urbina Urbina
- Succeeded by: José Ronaldo Jarabo

Minority Leader of the Puerto Rico House of Representatives
- In office 1983–1989
- Preceded by: Angel Viera Martínez
- Succeeded by: Edison Misla Aldarondo

Minority Whip of the Puerto Rico House of Representatives
- In office 1982–1983
- Succeeded by: Edison Misla Aldarondo

Speaker pro tempore of the House of Representatives of Puerto Rico
- In office 1977–1978
- Preceded by: Severo Colberg Ramírez
- Succeeded by: José E. Salichs Lopez de Haro
- In office 1997–1999
- Preceded by: Edison Misla Aldarondo
- Succeeded by: Edwin Mundo Ríos

Personal details
- Born: February 1, 1946
- Died: July 20, 2026 (aged 80)
- Education: University of Puerto Rico

José Granados Navedo (February 1, 1946 – July 20, 2026), was a former Speaker Pro Tempore, minority leader, and majority leader of the House of Representatives of Puerto Rico, serving a various times throughout the 1970s and 1980s, before briefly returning to elected office in the early 1990s. Married, with three children, he lives with his family in Florida.

== Early years ==
While attending the Academia Catolica during his school years, he was elected president of his sophomore class, publisher of the school newspaper and president of the student council. After enrolling in the University of Puerto Rico, he was elected to the General Studies Student Council and was elected its president. While in college, he represented Puerto Rico in the First International Youth Congress held at the United Nations General Assembly.

Granados continued his political career as a student leader at the University of Puerto Rico campus in Río Piedras, along with future House Speaker Edison Misla Aldarondo, future Senator Oreste Ramos, Jr. and future Senate Vice President Orlando Parga, Jr. In 1968 he was an unsuccessful candidate for elective office under the Statehood Republican Party (SRP) banner, as most statehooders switched their allegiance to the New Progressive Party (NPP), an offshoot of the SRP, which went on to win that year's general election. As secretary general of Acción Progresista, a pro-statehood student organization, he founded the longest lasting pro-statehood newspaper weekly, Decisión, in 1971. In that year, he was elected president of the New Progressive Party Youth organization and was nominated as one of that party's candidates for an at-large seat in the House of Representatives of Puerto Rico.

== Elective office ==
Elected to the House in 1972, he became an outspoken member of the opposition. After Gov. Rafael Hernández Colón's defeat in 1976, Granados was elected in 1977 as the Majority Leader in the House. In 1981, after the NPP lost control of that legislative body, he became outgoing Speaker Angel Viera Martínez' Minority Whip. When Viera Martínez bolted the NPP to join the Puerto Rico Renewal Party (PRP) in 1983, Granados became House Minority Leader, a position he held until 1988.

=== Statehood commission ===
In 1981, Granados founded the Puerto Rico Statehood Commission, a grassroots non-partisan organization dedicated to research and education on Puerto Rico statehood. The organization operated until 1986 and included among its leaders a wide array of prominent statehooders, such as attorney Zaida Hernández, who served as House Speaker and subsequently an appellate court judge. Also included were attorney Zulma Rosario, former Corrections Administrator and current head of the Government Ethics Office, attorney Nélida Jiménez Velázquez, also an appellate judge, Senator Oreste Ramos, Jr., Sol Luis Descartes, a former treasury secretary under PDP Governor Luis Muñoz Marín, who is the current secretary of state, former senate president Kenneth McClintock and attorney Luis Dávila Colón, currently Puerto Rico's most prominent political analyst. Granados' ideological organization still serves as a model, a quarter century later, for NPP educational efforts.

=== Staff ===
Many elected public officials in Puerto Rico initiated their incursion into electoral politics, either as members of his youth organizations or as members of his legislative staff. The youth organization served as a launching pad for Charlie Rodriguez, who later became President of the Senate; Senators Anibal Marrero and former senator Freddy Valentin, State Representatives Albita Rivera, Antonio Silva and Benjamin Velez; and mayors Juan Cruz Manzano of Manati and Benjamin Cintron Lebron of Patillas. Also State Representative Carlos Lopez, who later served as ombudsman.

Granados legislative office was a breeding ground of future political leaders. The present governor, Luis Fortuño, who led his party in 2008 to its largest landslide victory in history, was a summer intern at Granados' office while studying at Georgetown University. His aide, Zaida Hernández, later became Speaker of the House of Representatives; Kenneth McClintock culminated a four-term senatorial career as the 13th President of the Senate before becoming Puerto Rico's 22nd Secretary of State, while Orlando Parga, another Granados' aide, served as McClintock's Senate President pro tem; and Héctor O'Neill, who became senator and later mayor of Guaynabo and president of the Mayors Federation. The best recognition of the "breeding ground" status of his office can be found in the refusal by a political opponent, House Speaker Severo Colberg to approve a staffer selected by Granados, Manuel Agromayor, which resulted in litigation in the United States Circuit Court of Appeals for the First Circuit and reached the United States Supreme Court.

=== Ballot redesign ===
While studying the budget for a special election to fill a vacant House seat, Granados was appalled by the cost of ballot boxes. At the time, they were constructed of wood with the option of using metal. So he pulled out a piece of paper and designed the cardboard ballot box that is being used now throughout the world. He did not patent it. This was one of the more successful inventions attributed to him.

A forceful public speaker, he organized the mass rallies that provided the "grand finales' of the NPP's electoral campaigns in 1976 and 1980 where his party's candidate, Carlos Romero Barcelo, was elected and subsequently narrowly reelected to the governorship. He also produced a daily 30 second TV ad transmitted under the name Directo Al Punto credited by some with having contributed greatly to Pedro Rossello's triumph as governor in 1992 and 1996.

=== Mayoral campaign ===
In 1988, when San Juan Mayor Baltasar Corrada del Río lost his bid for governor in that year's PDP landslide, Granados lost the race to succeed Corrada in City Hall, losing to Hector Luis Acevedo of the PPD party, by a minuscule margin of only seven votes that finally had to be ratified in the courts.

=== Return to the house ===
Jose Granados made a comeback in 1992 when he was returned to the House, where he became Majority Leader. As chairman of the Socio-Economic and Planning Commission, he conducted studies on the condition of Puerto Rico's economic infrastructure including land, air and maritime transportation, water and sewage, energy production and waste management and was responsible for most of Rosselló's legislative agenda that laid the foundation for the major accomplishments of his gubernatorial administration. In 1997 he became Speaker of the House Pro Tem until his resignation from office.

== Literary accomplishments ==
In the early 1980s, Granados co-wrote and edited a ten-volume collection of educational lesson books on statehood for Puerto Rico.

He authored a novel, The Aikman Theory, that is being edited for publication and is writing a second one: The Dome on the Wall.

== Death ==
José Granados died on July 20, 2026 in Florida while on hospice care do to stomach cancer. He was 80 years old.
