= Cristino Bernazard =

American politician

Cristino Bernazard is the only person to have served beyond the inaugural session as an unelected speaker of the Puerto Rico House of Representatives.

Bernazard After having served as Secretary of the Puerto Rico House of Representatives under Speaker Angel Viera Martínez, after the 1980 elections, his last duty as outgoing Secretary in January 1981 was to preside over the inaugural session of the new House until the new speaker was elected, and swear him in. Because neither the New Progressive Party nor the Popular Democratic Party of Puerto Rico had yet obtained an absolute majority of the seats in the House, the body remained deadlocked until former Speaker Angel Viera Martínez and PDP Representative Severo Colberg reached a power-sharing agreement that allowed Viera Martínez to be elected Speaker in April. In the meantime, Bernazard remained acting Speaker, appointed a bipartisan pair of co-chairs to every committee. He worked to keep the House operating under unusual circumstances until a political agreement could relieve him of the prolongation of his duties as acting presiding officer and administrator of the House. He has been recognized by leaders of many political persuasions as someone who rose to the occasion and led with a steady hand until a political solution could be found to an unprecedented historical deadlock.

Bernazard was subsequently appointed by Governor Carlos Romero Barceló as a member of the Puerto Rico Industrial Commission, a nomination that breezed through the confirmation process in an opposition-controlled Senate, in recognition of the historic role he had played in maintaining democratic stability in a time of crisis.

From 1993 to 2000 completed his legislative staff career as Staff Director of the Senate Government Affairs Committee under two chairmen, Senators Rolando Silva and Kenneth McClintock, the latter being Puerto Rico's current Secretary of State.

Bernazard is a United States Air Force veteran from the Korean War era.

In 2000, his wife died days before his boss, McClintock, lost his mother. Coincidentally, the graves of these two wives of military veterans were placed side by side at the Puerto Rico National Cemetery in Bayamón, Puerto Rico. Bernazard retired and currently and lives in Hallandale Beach, Florida.
