= 1992 San Juan, Puerto Rico, mayoral election =

- November 3, 1992
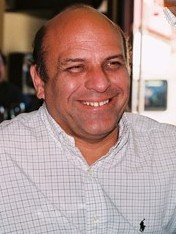

Nominee	Héctor Luis Acevedo	Carlos Díaz Olivo
Party	Popular Democratic	New Progressive
Popular vote	101,432	99,644
Percentage	48.65%	47.79%
Mayor before election
Héctor Luis Acevedo
Popular Democratic
Elected mayor
Héctor Luis Acevedo
Popular Democratic

San Juan, Puerto Rico, held an election for mayor on November 3, 1992. It was held as part of the 1992 Puerto Rican general election. It saw the reelection of incumbent mayor Héctor Luis Acevedo, a member of the Popular Democratic Party.

== Nominees ==
- Héctor Luis Acevedo (Popular Democratic Party), incumbent mayor
- Carlos Díaz Olivo (New Progressive Party)
- Hiram A. Meléndez Rivera (Puerto Rican Independence Party)

== Results ==
San Juan mayoral election
Party	Candidate	Votes	%
Popular Democratic	Héctor Luis Acevedo (incumbent)	101,432	48.65
New Progressive	Carlos Díaz Olivo	99,644	47.79
Independence	Hiram A. Meléndez Rivera	7,396	3.55
Write-In	Others	26	0.01
Total votes		208,498	100
