= Ángel Viera Martínez =

Puerto Rican politician (1915–2005)

At-Large Member of the Puerto Rico House of Representatives
- In office January 2, 1969 – January 2, 1985

22nd Speaker of the Puerto Rico House of Representatives
- In office January 10, 1977 – January 28, 1982
- Governor: Carlos Romero Barceló
- Preceded by: Luis E. Ramos Yordán
- Succeeded by: Severo Colberg Ramírez

20th Speaker of the Puerto Rico House of Representatives
- In office January 13, 1969 – December 31, 1972
- Governor: Luis A. Ferré Aguayo
- Preceded by: Arcilio Alvarado Alvarado
- Succeeded by: Luis E. Ramos Yordán

Personal details
- Born: Angel Viera Martínez; November 10, 1915 Gurabo, Puerto Rico
- Died: December 6, 2005 (age 90) Hato Rey, Puerto Rico
- Resting place: Buxeda Cemetery in Carolina, Puerto Rico
- Party: New Progressive
- Other political affiliations: Democratic
- Education: University of Puerto Rico School of Law (JD)
- Occupation: Lawyer

Attorney Ángel Viera Martínez (November 10, 1915 – December 6, 2005) was a prominent pro-statehood public servant in Puerto Rico during the second half of the 20th century.

== Biography ==
Earned his Juris Doctor from the University of Puerto Rico School of Law. He began his public service as a prosecutor. In 1968 he ran as a candidate for state representative under the banner of the New Progressive Party, which he helped found the year before. In January, 1969, he became Speaker of the Puerto Rico House of Representatives, collaborating closely with pro-statehood Governor Luis A. Ferré, while the Puerto Rico Senate, presided by Rafael Hernández Colón, remained under the control of the opposition Popular Democratic Party of Puerto Rico. When Hernández Colón and his party swept the 1972 elections, in 1973 Viera Martínez became House Minority Leader until he once again became Speaker in 1977.

As a result of the 1980 elections, the New Progressive Party had won 26 seats and the Popular Democratic Party 25, but the latter challenged the results of the 35th Representative District, creating a tie with each party holding 25 seats, pending the final results of that district. Since the new House in 1981 was tied, it was unable to elect a Speaker, as required, by an absolute majority. To complicate matters, Ramón Muñiz (PPD 32nd District) died on the House Floor in January 1981 and Representative-elect Fernando Tonos Florenzán's election was invalidated due to him not having the constitutionally required 25 years to serve in the House, leaving the House with 25 New Progressives and 23 Popular Democrats. House Secretary Cristino Bernazard, who normally would have presided over the House only until it elected its new Speaker in its inaugural session, became the first unelected Acting Speaker of the House. During Bernazard's incumbency, he appointed co-chairs to the House standing committees and required that all House decisions and legislation be approved by consensus. After some political wrangling, in what became known as the Viera-Colberg Pact, the House elected Viera Martinez once again as Speaker for the remainder of 1981 and maverick Popular Democratic Rep. Severo Colberg Ramírez as Speaker from 1982 until 1984. In late 1981, the Supreme Court ruled in favor of the Popular Democratic candidate in the 35th District, and with the Popular Democrats finally filling in the two vacancies they had, that party gained control of the House, with a majority of 26. In 1982, Viera Martínez once again became the House Minority Leader.

In 1983, he joined San Juan Mayor Hernán Padilla in bolting the NPP and founding the Puerto Rico Renewal Party, serving as its unsuccessful candidate for Resident Commissioner in the 1984 general elections, ending his elective career.

Died at Auxilio Mutuo Hospital due to heart failure at age 90. The House cloakroom was named after him before his death in 2005, when he was honored by Governor Aníbal Acevedo Vilá, House Speaker José Aponte and Senate President Kenneth McClintock with a state funeral.

He was buried at Buxeda Cemetery in Carolina, Puerto Rico.

Political offices
| Preceded by Arcilio Alvarado Alvarado | 20th Speaker of the Puerto Rico House of Representatives; 1969–1972 | Succeeded by Luis E. Ramos Yordán |
| Preceded by Luis E. Ramos Yordán | 22nd Speaker of the Puerto Rico House of Representatives; 1977–1982 | Succeeded by Severo Colberg Ramírez |
House of Representatives of Puerto Rico
| Preceded by Luis E. Ramos Yordán | Minority Leader of the Puerto Rico House of Representatives; 1973–1977 | Succeeded by Severo Colberg Ramírez |
| Preceded by Severo Colberg Ramírez | Minority Leader of the Puerto Rico House of Representatives; 1982–1983 | Succeeded by José N. Granados Navedos |
