= Payá =

Payá is a surname. Notable people with the surname include:

- Alberto Jarabo Payá (1928–2016), Spanish lawyer and politician
- Oswaldo Payá (1952–2012), Cuban political activist
