= Jorge Navarro Suárez =

Puerto Rican politician

Georgie Navarro Suárez
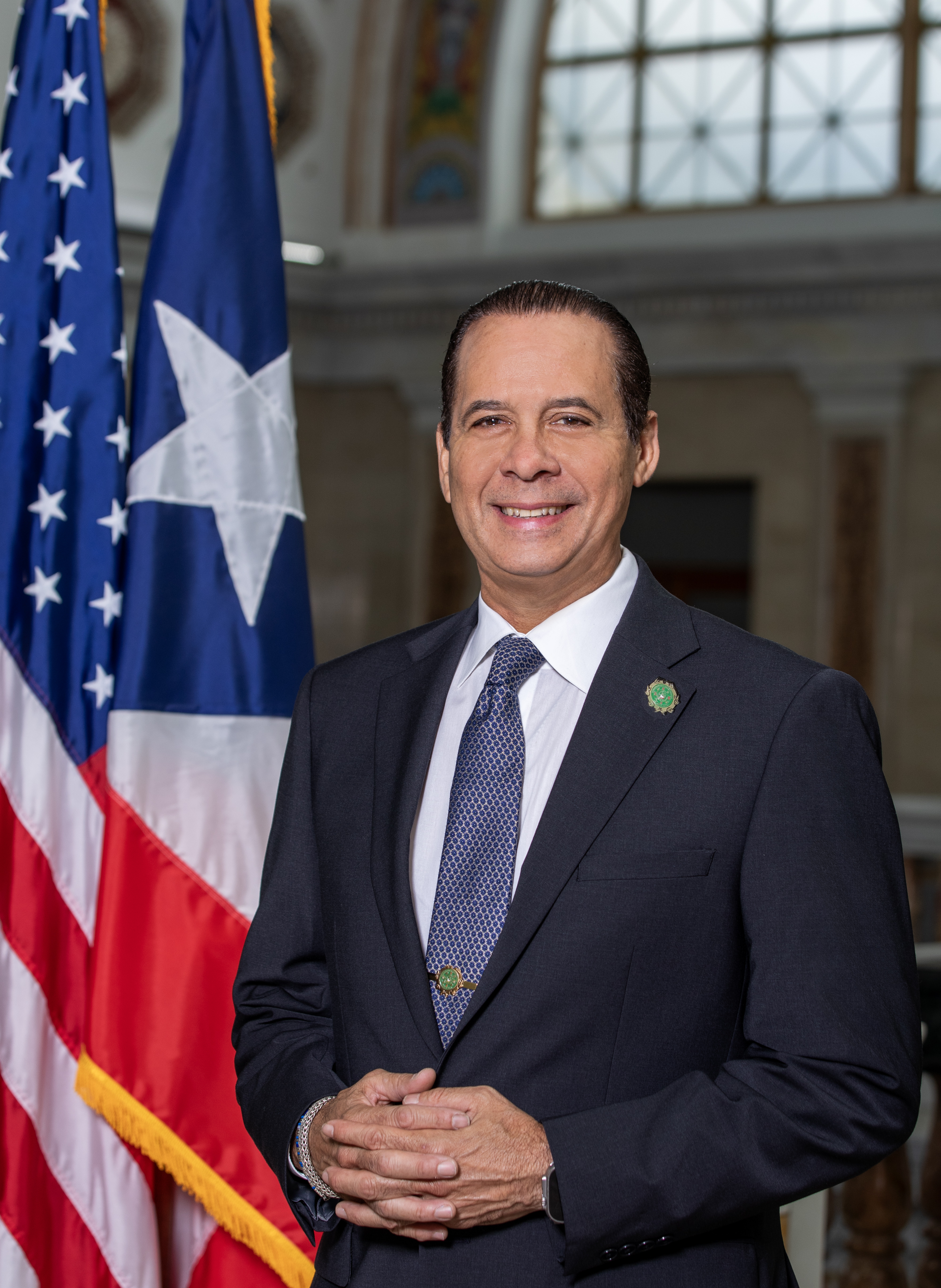

Member of the Puerto Rico House of Representatives from the 5th District
- Incumbent
- Assumed office January 2, 2005
- Preceded by: Roberto "Junior" Maldonado

Personal details
- Born: Jorge Luis Navarro Suárez; July 8, 1964 (age 62) San Juan, Puerto Rico
- Party: New Progressive Party (PNP)
- Education: University of Puerto Rico at Bayamón (BBM)

Jorge Luis Navarro Suárez (born July 8, 1964) is a Puerto Rican politician affiliated with the New Progressive Party (PNP). He has been a member of the Puerto Rico House of Representatives since 2004 representing District 5.

== Early years and studies ==
Jorge Luis Navarro Suárez was born on July 8, 1964, in San Juan. He is the second of five children born to politician Georgie Navarro Alicea and Nitza Suárez. Navarro graduated high school from the University Gardens School. He then completed a bachelor's degree in management and finance from the University of Puerto Rico at Bayamón.

== Professional career ==
After graduating, Navarro started working in the private sector, as manager in the Pueblo Supermarket chain. He also served as special aide of the then-secretary of commerce, Juan F. Woldroff. Navarro also worked as deputy director of a federal entrepreneurial program from the development bank called Minority Business Opportunity of Commerce, helping small business to develop.

== Political career ==
In 2004, Navarro won a seat in the Puerto Rico House of Representatives representing District 5. He has been reelected in 2008, 2012 and 2016

In 2010, Navarro was captured in an undercover video for ABC News during an event of the Council of United States Legislators in Louisville, Kentucky. During the video, which was part of an investigative report on the behavior of legislators, Navarro is seen allegedly harassing a female ABC journalism student. Navarro denied the allegations and claimed he got close to the student so he could listen to her.

He was baptized as "Cara de Juma Épica" by Puerto Rico Governor, Ricardo Rosselló, in the chats made public during the Rickyleaks scandal that culminated with Rossello's resignation.
