= Severo Colberg Toro =

Puerto Rican politician (born 1953)

At-Large Member of the Puerto Rico House of Representatives
- In office 1993–2004

Minority Leader of the Puerto Rico House of Representatives
- In office 1995–1997
- Preceded by: José Enrique Arrarás
- Succeeded by: Aníbal Acevedo Vilá

Personal details
- Born: November 6, 1953 (age 72) Cabo Rojo, Puerto Rico
- Party: Popular Democratic Party (PPD)
- Education: University of Puerto Rico School of Law (JD)

Severo Colberg Toro (born November 6, 1953, in Cabo Rojo, Puerto Rico) is a Puerto Rican politician and attorney. He served as a member of the Puerto Rico House of Representatives from 1993 to 2004. He is affiliated to the Popular Democratic Party (PPD).

== Early years and studies ==
Severo Colberg Toro was born on November 7, 1953, in Cabo Rojo. His parents are Severo Colberg Ramírez, a former President of the House of Representatives, and Eva Toro Franquiz, a college professor and former Student Dean at the University of Puerto Rico. His younger brother, Jorge, was also elected a member of the House of Representatives from 2003 to 2012.

Colberg Toro completed his bachelor's degree and law degree from the University of Puerto Rico School of Law in 1980. He worked as a legal counsel to the House of Representatives from 1981 to 1990 and was executive director of the House of Representatives Committee Against Government Corruption . He was also a member of the Board of the Puerto Rico Bar Association, and presided the presidential campaign of Rev. Jesse Jackson in Puerto Rico in 1988.

== Political career: 1992-2004 ==
Colberg was first elected to the Puerto Rico House of Representatives in 1992. He was appointed Minority Whip and Minority Speaker in 1995. Colberg was reelected in 1996 and 2000. During his time as representative, he was chair of the Employment Commission and the Public Integrity Commission.

In 2003, Colberg decided to run for the Senate of Puerto Rico, and gained a spot in the ballot at the PPD primaries. However, at the 2004 general elections, he lost.

== Legal troubles ==
In October 2024, Colberg was arrested during a drug bust operation in the Roosevelt housing project in Mayagüez, Puerto Rico. He had cocaine and $21 in cash with him.

House of Representatives of Puerto Rico
Preceded by Rolando Ortiz Velázquez	Minority Whip of the Puerto Rico House of Representatives; 1994–1995	Succeeded by Ferdinand Lugo González
Preceded by José Enrique Arrarás	Minority Leader of the Puerto Rico House of Representatives; 1995–1997	Succeeded by Aníbal Acevedo Vilá
