= 1976 San Juan, Puerto Rico, mayoral election =

- November 2, 1976
Nominee	Hernán Padilla	José Enrique Arrarás	Roberto Aponte Toro
Party	New Progressive	Popular Democratic	Independence
Popular vote	117,982	89,268	12,768
Percentage	52.95%	40.06%	5.73%
Mayor before election
Carlos Romero Barceló
New Progressive
Elected mayor
Hernán Padilla
New Progressive

San Juan, Puerto Rico, held an election for mayor on November 2, 1976. It was held as part of the 1976 Puerto Rican general election. It saw the election of Hernán Padilla, a member of the New Progressive Party.

Incumbent mayor Carlos Romero Barceló, a member of the New Progressive Party, did not seek re-election, and instead ran for governor.

== Nominees ==
- José Enrique Arrarás (Popular Democratic Party), secretary of the Housing Department
- Hernán Padilla (New Progressive Party), member of the Puerto Rico House of Representatives
- Lucía A. Romero (Puerto Rican Socialist Party)
- Florencio Merced Rosa (Puerto Rican Independence Party)

== Results ==
San Juan mayoral election
Party	Candidate	Votes	%
New Progressive	Hernán Padilla	117,982	52.95
Popular Democratic	José Enrique Arrarás	89,268	40.06
Independence	Roberto Aponte Toro	12,768	5.73
Socialist	Florencio Merced Rosa	2,816	1.26
Total votes		222,834	100
