= Roberto "Junior" Maldonado =

Puerto Rican politician

Member of the Puerto Rico House of Representatives from the 5th District
- In office January 2, 2001 – January 2, 2005
- Preceded by: Carlos Díaz
- Succeeded by: Jorge Navarro Suarez
- In office January 2, 1985 – January 2, 1993
- Preceded by: Edison Misla Aldarondo
- Succeeded by: Myrna Passalacqua

Majority Leader of the Puerto Rico House of Representatives
- In office January 2, 2001 – January 2, 2005
- Preceded by: Ángel Cintrón García
- Succeeded by: Iris M. Ruiz Class

Personal details
- Born: June 9, 1952 (age 74) San Juan, Puerto Rico
- Party: Popular Democratic Party (PPD)
- Education: University of Puerto Rico (BA)

Roberto "Junior" Maldonado Vélez (born June 9, 1952) is a former member of the House of Representatives of Puerto Rico who, in the United States territory's highly politicized environment, will serve under an opposing party's administration.

Maldonado Vélez has a bachelor's degree in arts with a concentration in psychology from the University of Puerto Rico.

Began 1973 he began he's career in public service as deputy Director of the Office of Plans and development of the housing department. Later in 1975 he was appointed Secretary of the Puerto Rico Department of Housing, a position he occupied until 1977.

Elected to the House in 1984, when he defeated incumbent San Juan District 5 Rep. Jorge Navarro-Alicea. Maldonado Vélez was reelected in 1988, defeated in 1992 and made a comeback in 2000, becoming the House's Majority Leader in 2001. He is the only political figure to have defeated Kenneth McClintock, who ran against him for the House District 5 seat in 1988 and later went on to become president of the Senate of Puerto Rico.

Governor Aníbal Acevedo Vilá nominated Maldonado Vélez to head the Puerto Rico Public Service Commission from 2004 to 2008.

On November 26, 2008, Maldonado Vélez was tapped by McClintock's successor, incoming Senate President Thomas Rivera Schatz, to become the Senate's Chief Administrative Officer in 2009, under the New Progressive Party of Puerto Rico's administration.

House of Representatives of Puerto Rico
Preceded by Myrna Passalacqua	Member of the Puerto Rico House of Representatives from the 5th District; 2001–2005	Succeeded by Jorge Navarro Suarez
Preceded by Ángel Cintrón García	Majority Leader of the Puerto Rico House of Representatives; 2001–2004	Succeeded by Iris M. Ruiz Class
