= Roberto Prats =

Puerto Rican politician (born 1966)

Roberto Prats-Palerm

Member of the Puerto Rico Senate from the at-large district
- In office 2000–2004

Personal details
- Born: 1966 (age 59–60) San Juan, Puerto Rico
- Party: Popular Democratic Democratic
- Children: Diego Prats-Fernandez, Sebastian Prats-Fernandez, Gabriel Prats-Bayonet
- Education: Cornell University (BA); Interamerican University of Puerto Rico School of Law (JD)
- Occupation: Politician, Attorney

Roberto Prats Palerm (born 1966) is a former Senator of Puerto Rico, a lawyer, and a former candidate for Resident Commissioner of Puerto Rico in the elections of 2004. He is affiliated and a member of the Governing Board of the Popular Democratic Party and chairman of the Democratic Party (United States) in Puerto Rico.

== Education ==
Prats received his bachelor's degree in policy analysis and management from Cornell University in 1990. He received his Juris Doctor degree from the Interamerican University of Puerto Rico School of Law.

== Political career ==
Prats began working in his early twenties with the Government of Puerto Rico. He worked closely with Sila M. Calderón, then Mayor of San Juan, being the city's Public Affairs and Federal Relations Advisor.

In the 2000 elections, Prats was elected as an at-large Senator, becoming the youngest at-large member that year of the Puerto Rican Senate. During his tenure, Prats pushed legislation that sought to help low-income families, environmental statutes and transportation legislation, and was considered a consensus-builder.

In 2003, Sila M. Calderón announced she would not seek a second term as governor. The resident commissioner of Puerto Rico, Aníbal Acevedo Vilá, was chosen to run for governor in the elections of 2004. Senator Roberto Prats became the Popular Democratic Party's nominee for resident commissioner for the upcoming elections, which he lost to Luis Fortuño, despite a big boost for his congressional campaign, when the Democratic National Committee (DNC) Chairman Terry McAuliffe endorsed him in March 2004. He subsequently was elected state chair of the Democratic Party in Puerto Rico, a position he currently holds, under DNC chairmen Howard Dean, with whom he also has a close relationship, Tim Kaine, the former governor of Virginia, Congresswoman Debbie Wasserman-Schultz and Donna Brazile. In the summer of 2016, he was elected to a fourth term as state chair.

One of Puerto Rico's "superdelegates", Prats announced his support in January 2008 of Sen. Hillary Clinton's presidential bid and served, along with then-Puerto Rico Senate President Kenneth McClintock, as co-chair of her Hispanic Leadership Council, in spite of his former running mate's (Gov. Acevedo Vilá's) endorsement of Sen. Barack Obama. Prats and McClintock also co-chaired Clinton's successful June 1, 2008 primary campaign in the U.S. territory. Both once again were her top spokespersons in Puerto Rico for the June 5, 2016 Puerto Rico primary, which she also won by over 60% of the vote.

In 2009, Prats was elected a member of the DNC's executive committee, the highest ranking Puerto Rican within the Democratic National Committee.

In November 2010, he coauthored a book on the 2008 Hillary Clinton campaign in Puerto Rico with McClintock, then Secretary of State.

In September 2024, Prats wrote a letter asking the judge presiding over the bribery case involving US Senator Bob Menendez, asking for a lenient sentence for the lawmaker who accepted gold bars, cash and other bribes in exchange for favors using his influence and power on behalf of criminal associates and foreign governments. https://newjerseymonitor.com/wp-content/uploads/2025/01/1-2-24-Menendez-sentencing-submission.pdf

== Publication ==
• Te Quiero Puerto Rico - Primaria Presidencial Demócrata 2008, Co-author with Kenneth McClintock, Aguilar, a subsidiary of Editorial Santillana, First edition in Spanish (200pp), 2010, ISBN 978-1-60484-744-4

== See also ==
- Popular Democratic Party of Puerto Rico
