= Luis Vega Ramos =

Puerto Rican politician (born 1970)

At-Large Member of the Puerto Rico House of Representatives
- In office August 21, 2006 – January 2, 2021
- Preceded by: Carlos Vizcarrondo Irizarry

Member of the Municipal Assembly of San Juan, Puerto Rico
- In office 2001–2004

Personal details
- Born: June 11, 1970 (age 56) Río Piedras, Puerto Rico
- Party: Popular Democratic Party (PPD)
- Education: University of Puerto Rico (BA, JD)

Luis Vega Ramos (born June 11, 1970) is a Puerto Rican lawyer and politician. He was a member of the Puerto Rico House of Representatives from 2006 to 2021.

== Early years and studies ==
Luis Vega Ramos was born on June 11, 1970, to Luis Vega López and Olga E. Ramos Rivera. Vega Ramos studied Political Science and Law at the University of Puerto Rico at Río Piedras.

== Political career ==
In the 90s, he served as legislative aide to the Judiciary Commission of the Senate of Puerto Rico. From 1995 to 2003, Vega Ramos presided PROELA, an organization that promotes the sovereign, non-territorial association between Puerto Rico and the United States. As such, he lectured several times at the White House, the United States Congress, and the United Nations. He continues to be one of the most visible advocates of the "soberanista" wing of the Popular Democratic Party.

In 2001, Vega Ramos was appointed by then-President of the House of Representatives Carlos Vizcarrondo Irizarry, as Director of his Legal and Legislative Counsel's Office. He occupied that position until 2003. Vega Ramos also served as a municipal legislator of San Juan for the Popular Democratic Party and as a legislative counsel to Governor Aníbal Acevedo Vilá.

From 2001 on, he has served as part of the multi-ideological Commission on Constitutional development of the "Colegio de Aboados de Puerto Rico". Said commission is a strong proponent of a Special Constitutional Assembly on Political Status as the proper mechanism to exercise Puerto Rico's right to self-determination.

Vega Ramos was elected to fill in the vacancy left by Carlos Vizcarrondo when he was appointed judge. He obtained 80% of the votes cast on July 16, 2006, by party delegates, and was sworn in August 21. After winning a slot at the PPD primaries, he was reelected at the 2008 general elections. He currently serves as Ranking Member of his party in the Commissions of Treasury and Capital City Development.

During the 2009–2012 term, Vega Ramos has been an outspoken critic of the Luis Fortuño administration. He advocated for the rights of fired public sector employees, for the Puerto Rico Bar Association (Colegio de Abogados) and the Northeastern Ecological Corridor (Corredor Ecológico del Noreste). He has been very active in fiscal, budgetary and job issues. He has confronted several heads of public agencies regarding their policies and decisions. They include former Secretary of Justice, Antonio Sagardía, Secretary of Transportation and Public Works, Rubén Hernández Gregorat, Secretary of Economic Development, José Pérez Riera and the President of the University of Puerto Rico, Miguel Muñoz. In February 2012 he put up an economic reactivation plan, entitled "I Believe in You" (Yo Creo en Ti).

In July 2011, he was elected as an at-large member to the governing board of the Popular Democratic Party. After the final electoral scrutiny of the March 18, 2012, primary, Vega Ramos was certified as the top vote getter for the at-large representative nominations. He got 222,055 votes and was closely followed by fellow "soberanista" Carmen Yulín Cruz Soto with 221,891 votes.

Vega Ramos is currently active in his party's electoral campaign.

== Writing and professional career ==
Vega Ramos has also published four books:

- La Nación en Asociación (2000), which was in the top-selling list of that year
- Baldorioty Ahora (2002), a compilation of essays from Román Baldorioty de Castro
- Entre Fraude y Dignidad: Una Elección para la Historia (2005), a chronicle of the 2004 general elections
- Pan, Tierra y Libertad: Historia y Filosofía del Partido Popular Democrático, an inside-look on the history and philosophy of his party.

Vega Ramos has also worked as political commentator in the show Reacción Inmediata, from Radio Isla. He also has worked as an attorney in the private sector.
