= 1996 San Juan, Puerto Rico, mayoral election =

- November 5, 1996
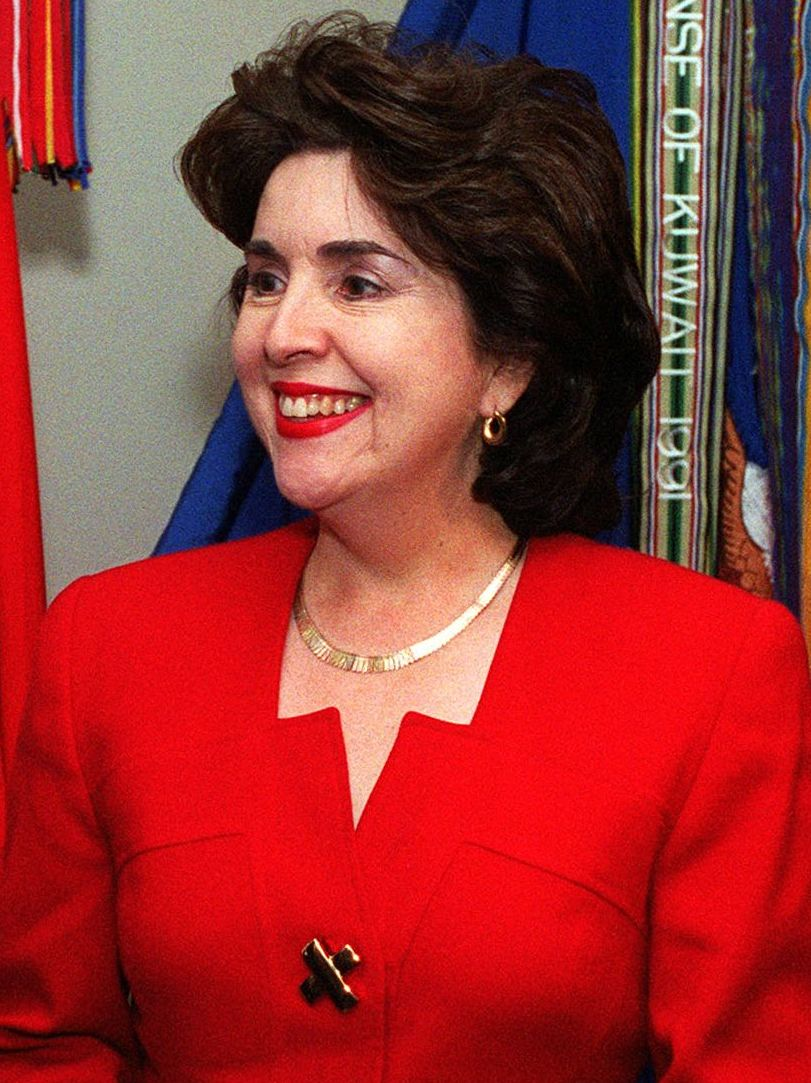

Nominee	Sila María Calderón	Zaida Cucusa Hernández
Party	PPD	PNP
Alliance	Democratic	Republican
Popular vote	105,940	97,572
Percentage	50.40%	46.41%
Mayor before election
Héctor Luis Acevedo
Popular Democratic
Elected mayor
Sila María Calderón
Popular Democratic

San Juan, Puerto Rico, held an election for mayor on November 5, 1996. It was held as part of the 1996 Puerto Rican general election. It saw the election of Sila María Calderón, a member of the Popular Democratic Party.

== Nominations ==
=== New Progressive Party primary ===
The New Progressive Party nominated speaker of the House of Representatives of Puerto Rico Zaida Cucusa Hernández in a primary held by the party on April 2, 1995. This marked the first time that the party had ever held a mayoral primary.

Out of roughly 30,000 votes cast, Calderon received roughly 90% of the vote in a landslide victory, defeating Jorge de Castro (former member of the Puerto Rican House of Representatives) and Nicolas Gautier.

=== Popular Democratic Party ===
The Popular Democratic Party nominated former secretary of state of Puerto Rico Sila María Calderón.

=== Puerto Rican Independence Party ===
The Puerto Rican Independence Party nominated Irma Rodríguez

== General election ==
This was the first mayoral election in the city's history in which the two leading candidates were both women.

=== Results ===
San Juan mayoral election
Party	Candidate	Votes	%
Popular Democratic	Sila María Calderón	105,940	50.40
New Progressive	Zaida "Cucusa" Hernández	97,572	46.41
Independence	Irma Rodríguez	5,330	2.54
Write-In	Others	1,378	0.66
Total votes		210,220	100
