= José Enrique Arrarás =

Puerto Rican politician

At-Large Member of the Puerto Rico House of Representatives
- In office 1978–1980
- In office 1993–1996

Minority Leader of the Puerto Rico House of Representatives
- In office 1994–1995
- Preceded by: Alfonso López Chaar
- Succeeded by: Severo Colberg Toro

President of the Puerto Rico Olympic Committee
- In office 1973–1977
- Preceded by: Felicio Torregrosa
- Succeeded by: Germán Rieckehoff

Personal details
- Born: September 25, 1937 (age 89) Mayagüez, Puerto Rico
- Party: Popular Democratic Party (PPD)
- Spouse: Brenda López González
- Education: Princeton University (BA); University of Puerto Rico School of Law (LL.M); University of Santiago de Compostela (DCL)

José Enrique Arrarás Mir (born 25 September 1937) is a Puerto Rican politician and former member of the Legislative Assembly of Puerto Rico.

== Early life ==
Arrarás was born in Mayagüez, Puerto Rico. He obtained his primary and secondary education at Academia de la Inmaculada Concepción in Mayagüez and Mercersburg Academy in Mercersburg, Pennsylvania.

Arrarás is great-great-grand-nephew of Pedro Gerónimo Goyco, and a third-cousin of Charytín Goyco.

== Education ==
He obtained a B.A. in Public and International Affairs (magna cum laude) at Princeton University in 1959. As a Fulbright Scholar to the United Kingdom, he did post-graduate work in political, economic and social problems of underdeveloped countries at Victoria University of Manchester as well as Oxford University.

Back in Puerto Rico, he obtained his L.L.B. law degree (magna cum laude and valedictorian) at the University of Puerto Rico School of Law in 1963, received his Doctor in Civil Law (magna cum laude) from the University of Santiago de Compostela in Spain in 1971.

He also holds a doctorate honoris causa from World University.

== Public service at University of Puerto Rico ==
Arrarás began serving UPR Chancellor Jaime Benítez as his special assistant in 1962, even before graduating from law school. He began teaching law at the University of Puerto Rico School of Law shortly after obtaining his law degree in 1963, while remaining the Chancellor's trusted aide until 1964, when he began a two-year stint as the UPR Río Piedras Campus Dean of Administration and Acting Chancellor. As Benítez moved on to become the institution's first system-wide President, Arrarás served as the first chancellor of the University of Puerto Rico's Mayagüez Campus for over 5 years, from 1966 to 1971.

Years later, he would also teach at the Interamerican University's School of Law in San Juan.

== Political life and state government service ==
After an unsuccessful run for Mayor of San Juan in 1972 under the Popular Democratic Party banner, Arrarás was appointed in 1973 as the Secretary of the new Housing Department by incoming Gov. Rafael Hernández Colón, a position he held until 1976, when he once again ran unsuccessfully for mayor, losing by a landslide to then Rep. Hernán Padilla.

He began his first ten-year stint in the Puerto Rico House of Representatives in 1978, serving as chairman of the powerful Budget and finance committee from 1981 to 1984.

During his second stint in the House, from 1993 to 1996, in which he served two years as House Minority Leader, he faced ethics charges and a Justice Department referral to the Special Independent Prosecutor. Arrarás did not seek re-election in the 1996 General Elections.

== Sports life ==
In addition to all that Arrarás accomplished in academia and public office, he has been one of the most prominent figures in organized sports in Puerto Rico for the past four decades.

He served as vice president of the Puerto Rico Olympic Committee (COPUR) from 1969 to 1972 before serving as the president of COPUR from 1973 to 1976, at the same time that he served as president of the Puerto Rico Equestrian Federation.

In 2000 he served as owner of the Mayagüez Basketball Team. From 2001 on, he serves once again on the Puerto Rico Olympic Committee and president of the Puerto Rico Amateur Athletics Federation, and since 2002 is also the Commissioner of the Inter-University Athletic League (LAI by its Spanish acronym).

In 2004, as a member of the International Athletics Federation (IAFF), he was appointed to its Youth & School Committee.

== Professional and private life ==
An attorney, José Enrique Arrarás served as senior partner at the Goldman Antonnetti law firm from 1989 to 1992 and currently works out of the Castellanos Law Firm office in San Juan. He is married to professor Brenda López González and is father of seven children: Maria Celeste, Astrid, José Enrique, Jr., Patricia, Gabriel Enrique, Enrique Antonio and Isabel Celeste. María Celeste's TV journalism career has proudly turned Arrarás, in spite of his extensive life achievements, into "María Celeste's father".

His wife, Brenda López, was elected in 2008 as an at-large member of the House of Representatives of Puerto Rico.

== Publications ==
Arrarás' extensive writing includes the following publications:

- "Judicial Attitudes and Amendments to the Compact", Revista Jurídica de la Universidad de Puerto Rico, Vol. XXXI (1962)pp. 65–78.
- "Spontaneous Manifestations, Objections and the First Opportunity Doctrine". Pueblo vs. Oquendo. 83 D.P.R. 234 (1961).
- Revista Jurídica de la Universidad de Puerto Rico, Vol. XXXII, Núm. 1 (1963), pp. 141–150 "The Insanes' capacity to Contract".
- Revista Jurídica de la Universidad de Puerto Rico, Vol. XXXII, Núm. 1 (1963) pp. 69–80 "Consensual Marriage in the United States of America".
- Revista Estudios de Derechos, (Republica de Colombia), Vol. 63 (1963) pp. 53–62 "Concubinage in Latin America".
- Journal of Family Law, Vol. 3, No. 2, pp. 330–339 (1963)
- "A note on Free Union in Latin American", Marriage and Family Living", 1964
- "The Commonwealth Concept", oral presentation made at the Second Conference of Caribbean Scholars, in the University of Western Indians, (Kingston, Jamaica). Published by Instituto de Estudios del Caribe de la Universidad de Puerto Rico. (1965).
- Doctoral Thesis: "El Derecho Matrimonial Puertorriqueño"

== See also ==
- University of Puerto Rico at Mayagüez people

== Sources ==
- Galería Universia - Last additions/José Enrique Arrarás
- Puerto Rico en el Olimpismo

House of Representatives of Puerto Rico
Preceded by Alfonso López Chaar	Minority Leader of the Puerto Rico House of Representatives; 1994–1995	Succeeded by Severo Colberg Toro
