= José Menéndez Monroig =

American politician

Member of the Puerto Rico Senate from the at-large district
- In office 1968–1976

Minority Leader of the Puerto Rico Senate
- In office 1973–1977
- Preceded by: Justo A. Méndez Rodriguez
- Succeeded by: Miguel Hernández Agosto

Personal details
- Born: June 22, 1917 Santurce, Puerto Rico
- Died: April 4, 2003 (aged 85) San Juan, Puerto Rico
- Spouse: Lyda Cortada Menendez
- Children: Michele and Jose Menendez
- Education: University of Puerto Rico School of Law (JD)
- Occupation: Lawyer, Politician, Senator

Military service
- Allegiance: United States of America
- Branch/service: United States Army
- Rank: Captain
- Battles/wars: World War II

José María Menéndez Monroig (June 22, 1917 – April 4, 2003) was a member of the Puerto Rico Senate serving from 1968 till 1976. After the 1972 Puerto Rican elections Carlos Romero Barcelo suggested that he be selected Minority Leader in the Senate instead of Justo Méndez who had occupied that position in the past four years. He was one of the founders of Estadistas Unidos. He was a member of Phi Sigma Alpha fraternity. He also earned a law degree from the University of Puerto Rico School of Law.

He was known to mentor future leaders of the New Progressive Party. He was also secretary of the party. While serving as Minority Leader of the Senate, his chief of staff was Rafael Rodríguez Aguayo, who went on to serve as Secretary General of the New Progressive Party and as an aide to governors Carlos Romero Barceló, Pedro Rosselló and Luis Fortuño. In the four-year period from 1969 to 1972, he was the Spokesman of the New Progressive Party in the Senate Finance Committee. His administrative assistant, Carmencita Colón De Armas, went on to serve three governors, Romero, Pedro Rosselló and Ricardo Rosselló in high level positions within the Governor's Office, and a summer intern, Kenneth McClintock, succeeded him a quarter century later as Senate Minority Leader.

He served for six years in the United States Army, and was buried with military honors in the Puerto Rico National Cemetery.

Senate of Puerto Rico
Preceded by Justo A. Méndez Rodriguez	Minority Leader of the Puerto Rico Senate; 1973–1977	Succeeded by Miguel Hernández Agosto
