= 1988 San Juan, Puerto Rico, mayoral election =

- November 2, 1988
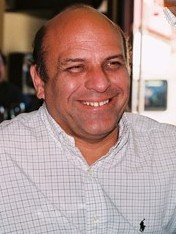

Nominee	Héctor Luis Acevedo	José Granados
Party	Popular Democratic	New Progressive
Popular vote	100,525	100,496
Mayor before election
Baltasar Corrada del Río
New Progressive
Elected mayor
Héctor Luis Acevedo
Popular Democratic

San Juan, Puerto Rico, held an election for mayor on November 2, 1988. It was held as part of the 1988 Puerto Rican general election. It saw the election Héctor Luis Acevedo, a member of the Popular Democratic Party. Acevedo defeated his main opponent, New Progressive Party nominee José Granados (the minority leader of the Puerto Rico House of Representatives) by margin of merely 29 votes (winning 100,525 votes to Granados' 100,496 votes). Acevedo became the first Popular Democratic Party mayor in twenty years, ending a twenty-year long streak of New Progressive Party mayors.

Incumbent mayor Baltasar Corrada del Río did not seek reelection, instead running unsuccessfully for governor.

The election coincided with a landslide success that year for the Popular Democratic Party.
