= 1980 San Juan, Puerto Rico, mayoral election =

- November 4, 1980
Nominee	Hernán Padilla	Celeste Benitez	Roberto Aponte Toro
Party	New Progressive	Popular Democratic	Independence
Popular vote	117,797	86,346	14,767
Percentage	53.50%	39.22%	6.71%
Mayor before election
Hernán Padilla
New Progressive
Elected mayor
Hernán Padilla
New Progressive

San Juan, Puerto Rico, held an election for mayor on November 4, 1980. It was held as part of the 1980 Puerto Rican general election. It saw the reelection of incumbent mayor Hernán Padilla, a member of the New Progressive Party.

== Nominees ==
- Celeste Benitez (Popular Democratic Party)
- Hernán Padilla (New Progressive Party), former member of the Puerto Rico House of Representatives
- Lucía A. Romero (Puerto Rican Socialist Party)
- Roberto Aponte Toro (Puerto Rican Independence Party)

== Results ==
San Juan mayoral election
Party	Candidate	Votes	%
New Progressive	Hernán Padilla Ramírez (incumbent)	117,797	53.50
Popular Democratic	Celeste Benitez	86,346	39.22
Independence	Roberto Aponte Toro	14,767	6.71
Socialist	Lucía A. Romero	1,259	0.57
Total votes		220,169	100
