= Luisa Gándara =

First Lady of Puerto Rico and politician (1954–2023)

At-Large Member of the Puerto Rico House of Representatives
- In office March 13, 2013 – January 2, 2017

11th First Lady of Puerto Rico
- In role January 2, 2005 – January 2, 2009
- Governor: Aníbal Acevedo Vilá
- Preceded by: Sila María and María Elena González Calderón
- Succeeded by: Lucé Vela

Personal details
- Born: April 30, 1954
- Died: June 14, 2023 (aged 69) San Juan, Puerto Rico
- Party: Popular Democratic Party (PPD)
- Spouse: Aníbal Acevedo Vilá
- Children: 2
- Education: University of Puerto Rico; University of Florida (MS)
- Profession: Teacher; Educator IBM Systems; Education Specialist

Luisa "Piti" Gándara Menéndez (April 30, 1954 – June 14, 2023) was a Puerto Rican politician and wife of former Governor of Puerto Rico Aníbal Acevedo Vilá. As Acevedo Vilá's wife, Gándara served as First Lady from 2005 to 2009. In 2013, Gándara was elected by the Popular Democratic Party (PPD) to fill the vacancy left by Jorge Colberg Toro as representative at-large in the 29th House of Representatives.

== Early years and studies ==
Luisa "Piti" Gándara was born on April 30, 1954. Her father was a public accountant and her mother was a florist. Gándara was the youngest of five siblings. She earned her high school degree from Academia Sagrado Corazón, studied at the Faculty of Pedagogy of University of Puerto Rico, and then completed a Master's degree in education at the University of Florida.

== Professional career ==
Gándara worked as a high school biology teacher and as a specialist in educational technology for IBM for 17 years.

== Political career ==
=== First Lady: 2005-2009 ===
Following the tradition of previous Puerto Rico first ladies, Gándara refrained from holding a remunerative job while a resident of La Fortaleza. As First Lady, she dedicated much of her attention to educational issues. She developed two reading programs: Lee y Sueña and Rincón de la Lectura. The first donated 60,000 books to children, while the second sparked the creation of 50 reading centers around the island. The programs received national recognition, including an Innovations Award from the Council of State Governments, and an award from the Ibero-American Council in Honor of Educational Quality.

Active in her husband's successful congressional campaign in 2000 and his campaign for governor in 2004, Gándara was heavily involved in his reelection bid in 2008 and supported him during a federal trial against him.

=== Representative aspirations: 2013 ===
In March 2013, Gándara presented her candidacy to fill a vacant slot at the House of Representatives of Puerto Rico. She was elected during an internal election within the party on March 13, 2013.

== Personal life and death ==
Gándara and Acevedo Vilá had two children: Gabriela, a Harvard graduate and producer in Los Angeles, California, and Juan Carlos, a University of Puerto Rico graduate and educator.

In 2011, Gándara confirmed she had been diagnosed with breast cancer. She died on June 14, 2023, at the age of 69.

== Awards and recognitions ==
- Council of State Governments State Innovations Award for a reading program that she developed as First Lady
- Premio Iberoamericano Excelencia Academica 2008 (in Guayaquil, Ecuador) for promoting early childhood education

Honorary titles
Preceded by Sila María González Calderón and María Elena González Calderón	First Lady of Puerto Rico; 2005–2009	Succeeded by Lucé Vela
