= Edison Misla Aldarondo =

Puerto Rican politician (1942–2021)

26th Speaker of the Puerto Rico House of Representatives
- In office January 13, 1997 – December 31, 2000
- Governor: Pedro Rosselló González
- Preceded by: Zaida R. Hernández Torres
- Succeeded by: Carlos Vizcarrondo Irizarry

Member of the Puerto Rico House of Representatives from the District 4
- In office January 2, 1985 – January 14, 2002
- Preceded by: Adolfo Dones
- Succeeded by: Jenniffer A. González Colón

Member of the Puerto Rico House of Representatives from the District 5
- In office January 2, 1977 – January 2, 1985
- Preceded by: Ramón Ramos Vaello
- Succeeded by: Roberto "Junior" Maldonado

Speaker pro tempore of the House of Representatives of Puerto Rico
- In office January 11, 1993 – December 31, 1996
- Preceded by: Samuel Ramírez
- Succeeded by: José N. Granados Navedos

Minority Leader of the Puerto Rican House of Representatives
- In office January 2, 1989 – December 31, 1992
- Preceded by: José N. Granados Navedos
- Succeeded by: Alfonso López Chaar
- In office January 2, 2001 – January 14, 2002
- Preceded by: Aníbal Acevedo Vilá
- Succeeded by: Aníbal Vega Borges

Personal details
- Born: August 29, 1942 Isabela, Puerto Rico
- Died: November 30, 2021 (aged 79) San Juan, Puerto Rico
- Resting place: Cementerio Los Cipreses in Bayamón, Puerto Rico
- Party: New Progressive Party of Puerto Rico
- Other political affiliations: Republican
- Education: University of Puerto Rico

Edison Misla Aldarondo (August 29, 1942 – November 30, 2021) was a Puerto Rican Republican politician who served as the Speaker of the Puerto Rican House of Representatives from 1997 to 2001. He was a founder of the pro-statehood New Progressive Party of Puerto Rico (NPP). He had also served as Representative from the 4th District (San Juan) from 1977 to 2002, and as Chairman of the San Juan NPP Municipal Committee from 1998 to 1999.

== Resignation ==
In 2001, he resigned his position in the House and was accused of extortion, money laundering and witness tampering in connection with financing a local hospital.

== Rape ==
In 2002, he was charged with rape of the 17-year-old friend of his step-daughter to whom he had given alcohol and prescription drugs. Under questioning, his step-daughter claimed that he had also been molesting her for eight years. He was convicted of sexual abuse of a minor, and sentenced to 13 years in prison.

== Corruption conviction ==
In 2004, he was also convicted on fifteen charges of corruption, and sentenced to nine years in prison. In 2015, Misla Aldarondo was released from prison to complete the rest of his sentence in house arrest.

== Death ==
Edison Misla Aldarondo died on November 30, 2021, as a result of a heart attack. He was buried at Cementerio Los Cipreses in Bayamón, Puerto Rico.

== See also ==
- Crime in Puerto Rico

House of Representatives of Puerto Rico
Preceded by Adolfo Dones	Member of the Puerto Rico House of Representatives from the 4th district 1985–2002	Succeeded by Jenniffer A. Gónzález Colón
Preceded by Ramón Ramos Vaello	Member of the Puerto Rico House of Representatives from the 5th district 1977–1985	Succeeded by Roberto "Junior" Maldonado
Preceded by José Granados	Minority Whip of the Puerto Rico House of Representative; 1983–1989	Succeeded by Carlos J. López Nieves
Preceded by José Granados	Minority Leader of the Puerto Rico House of Representatives; 1989–1993	Succeeded by Alfonso López Chaar
Political offices
Preceded by Zaida R. Hernández Torres	Speaker of the Puerto Rico House of Representatives; 1997–2000	Succeeded by Carlos Vizcarrondo Irizarry
