= Sol Luis Descartes =

Puerto Rican politician (1911–1993)

Sol Luis Descartes Andreu (August 25, 1911 in Ponce, Puerto Rico – July 20, 1993 in San Juan, Puerto Rico) was a graduate in agricultural economics from Cornell University, served as Puerto Rico's Secretary of the Treasury during the administration of Governor Luis Muñoz Marín from 1949 to 1955. He was a member of Phi Sigma Alpha fraternity.

In 1935, he assisted in the preparation of Puerto Rico's 1935 Agricultural Census.

After his career in public service, Descartes served as president of the Interamerican University of Puerto Rico from 1970 to 1977.

After supporting the status quo as a member of Puerto Rico's Popular Democratic Party for many decades, he was appointed by Governor Luis A. Ferré as a member of the Ad Hoc Committee that studied the extension of the presidential vote to Puerto Rico. In the 1970s his sympathies for statehood became apparent, as Jose Trias Monge noted in his book "Historia Constitucional de Puerto Rico, Vol. V" and he became active in the Puerto Rico Statehood Commission headed by then Rep. José Granados between 1981 and 1986.

His archives were donated to the Center for Historical Research or Centro de Investigaciones Históricas (CIH) of the University of Puerto Rico at Río Piedras.

== Sources ==
- Historia del Recinto Metropolitano de la Universidad Interamericana de Puerto Rico (1962–2012) by Pedro A. González Vélez, Ph.D. ISBN 978-1-936534-89-0

Political offices
Preceded by Rafael Buscaglia	Secretary of Treasury of Puerto Rico; 1949–1955	Succeeded by Rafael Picó
