= Luis Ernesto Ramos Yordán =

Puerto Rican politician

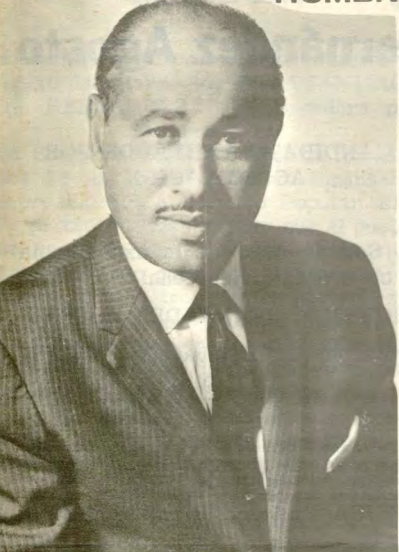
- Ramos Yordán c. early 1970s

At-Large Member of the Puerto Rico House of Representatives
- In office January 2, 1969 – January 2, 1976

22nd Speaker of the Puerto Rico House of Representatives
- In office 1973–1976
- Preceded by: Ángel Viera Martínez
- Succeeded by: Ángel Viera Martínez

Personal details
- Born: Luis Ernesto Ramos Yordán; February 5, 1915 Ponce, Puerto Rico
- Died: January 27, 2005 (aged 89) San Antonio, Texas, United States
- Education: Syracuse University; National Autonomous University of Mexico (M.D.)

Luis Ernesto Ramos Yordán (February 5, 1915 – January 27, 2005) was a Puerto Rican physician, legislator, and President of the House of Representatives of Puerto Rico from 1973 to 1977.

== Early years ==
Ramos Yordán was born in Ponce, Puerto Rico on February 2, 1915. He received his degree from Syracuse University in Syracuse, New York, and his Doctor of Medicine degree from the National Autonomous University of Mexico. He subsequently did advanced post-graduate work at Columbia University.

== Political life ==
In the 1968 general elections Ramos Yordan was elected to the Puerto Rico House of Representatives as a representative at-large. He was a member of the Popular Democratic Party of Puerto Rico. During his term, he was minority leader in the House. In 1972 he was re-elected and became the speaker of that legislative body.

== See also ==
- List of Puerto Ricans

House of Representatives of Puerto Rico
Preceded by Baldomero Roig Vélez	Minority Leader of the Puerto Rico House of Representatives; 1969–1973	Succeeded by Angel Viera Martínez
Political offices
Preceded by Angel Viera Martínez	Speaker of the Puerto Rico House of Representatives; 1973–1976	Succeeded by Angel Viera Martínez
