= Victoria Muñoz Mendoza =

Puerto Rican politician

Melo Muñoz

Member of the Puerto Rico Senate from the at-large district
- In office 1985–1993

Personal details
- Born: December 24, 1940 (age 85) San Juan, Puerto Rico
- Party: Popular Democratic
- Other political affiliations: Democratic
- Spouse: Minas Papadakis
- Children: 5
- Relatives: Luis Muñoz Marín (Father); Inés Mendoza (Mother)
- Education: University of Puerto Rico (BA)

Victoria "Melo" Muñoz Mendoza (born December 24, 1940) is a former politician from Puerto Rico. She is the daughter of the first democratically elected governor of Puerto Rico, Luis Muñoz Marín, founder of the Popular Democratic Party and his second wife, Inés Mendoza. Muñoz Mendoza was the first woman in Puerto Rican history to seek the office of Governor of Puerto Rico.

== Education ==
Muñoz attended University High School in Rio Piedras, Puerto Rico. She went to the University of Puerto Rico, where she received a degree in Literature in 1962.

== Political career ==
Muñoz Mendoza first went into active in politics in 1984, when she made an unsuccessful bid to become Mayor of San Juan. In 1986, she was chosen to replace a senator in the Senate of Puerto Rico. She held the seat for seven years, after having been re-elected in 1988.

In 1992, she became the first woman to seek the governorship of Puerto Rico. She faced Pedro Rosselló of the New Progressive Party and ended up losing. She retired from politics soon after her electoral defeat.

In 2000, Sila María Calderón was elected Governor of Puerto Rico, becoming the first woman to do so. Muñoz Mendoza vigorously campaigned and endorsed her, fulfilling her dream of having a female Governor.

Party political offices
Preceded by Rafael Hernández Colón	Chair of the Puerto Rico Popular Democratic Party; 1992–1994	Succeeded by Héctor Luis Acevedo
Preceded by Rafael Hernández Colón	Popular Democratic nominee for Governor of Puerto Rico; 1992	Succeeded by Héctor Luis Acevedo
