= Carlos Vizcarrondo =

Puerto Rican politician

Carlos Vizcarrondo Irizarry

27th Speaker of the Puerto Rico House of Representatives
- In office January 2, 2001 – January 1, 2005
- Preceded by: Edison Misla Aldarondo
- Succeeded by: José Aponte Hernández

At-Large Member of the Puerto Rico House of Representatives
- In office 1995–2005

Vice-president of the Municipal Assembly of Carolina, Puerto Rico
- In office 1985–1988

Judge of the Puerto Rico Court of Appeals
- In office 2006–2021
- Appointed by: Aníbal Acevedo Vilá

Personal details
- Born: Carlos Luis Jesús Vizcarrondo Irizarry; November 9, 1955 (age 70) Santurce, Puerto Rico
- Party: Popular Democratic Party (PPD)
- Education: University of Puerto Rico (BA); Interamerican University of Puerto Rico School of Law (JD)

Carlos Luis Jesús Vizcarrondo Irizarry (born November 9, 1955, in Santurce, Puerto Rico) is a Puerto Rican politician, judge, and former representative. He is affiliated with the Popular Democratic Party (PPD). Vizcarrondo served at the Puerto Rico House of Representatives from 1995 to 2005, and served as Speaker of the House during his last term (2001–2005). He served as a judge at the Puerto Rico Court of Appeals.

== Biography ==
Carlos Luis Jesús Vizcarrondo Irizarry was born on November 9, 1955, in Santurce, Puerto Rico. His parents were Luis Héctor Vizcarrondo Wolf and Sonia Irizarry Boada. Vizcarrondo has a brother (Luis Héctor) and a sister (Sonia Margarita).

Vizcarrondo, who is an attorney, began his career working at the Legal Services Office in Canóvanas, Puerto Rico, first as deputy director (1982–1993) and then as Director (1993–1995).

Vizcarrondo's political career began from 1985 to 1988, when he was vice-president of the Municipal Assembly of Carolina, Puerto Rico. In 1995, he joined the Puerto Rico House of Representatives. He was elected officially in 1996. He was again reelected at the 2000 general elections and was appointed as Speaker of the House. He served as such until 2005.

Vizcarrondo is also a member of the Puerto Rico Bar Association, and was a member of the Constitutional Rights Committee in it. From 1986 to 1988, he also served as vice-president of the Association.

In 2006 Vizcarrondo was appointed Judge of the Puerto Rico Court of Appeals to a term from 2006 to 2021.

In 2023 Vizcarrondo was named presidential delegate by the general secretary Luis Vega Ramos of the Popular Democratic Party to the municipality of Ponce, Puerto Rico while mayor Luis Irizarry Pabón was being investigated by the Office of the Panel on the Special Independent Prosecutor (OPFEI).

== See also ==
- List of Puerto Ricans

Political offices
Preceded by Edison Misla Aldarondo	Speaker of the Puerto Rico House of Representatives; 2001–2005	Succeeded by José Aponte Hernández
