= Zaida Cucusa Hernández =

American politician

Zaida R. Hernández Torres

25th Speaker of the Puerto Rico House of Representatives
- In office January 11, 1993 – January 13, 1997
- Governor: Pedro Rosselló
- Preceded by: José R. Jarabo Alvarez
- Succeeded by: Edison Misla Aldarondo

At-Large Member of the Puerto Rico House of Representatives
- In office January 2, 1985 – January 2, 1997
- Preceded by: Angel Viera Martínez
- Succeeded by: Iris M. Ruiz Class

Judge of the Puerto Rico Court of Appeals
- In office 1997–2008

Personal details
- Born: Zaida Rosa Hernández Torres; October 30, 1954 (age 71) Morovis, Puerto Rico
- Party: New Progressive Party of Puerto Rico
- Other political affiliations: Republican
- Education: University of Puerto Rico (BSS); Interamerican University of Puerto Rico School of Law (JD); Pontifical Catholic University of Puerto Rico School of Law (LL.M)
- Occupation: Lawyer

Zaida R. "Cucusa" Hernández Torres (born August 30, 1952) is a Puerto Rican politician who served as the Speaker of the Puerto Rican House of Representatives from 1993 to 1996. She also served as At-Large Representative from 1985 to 1997, and as Chairman of the San Juan NPP Municipal Committee from 1995 to 1997.

== Early life and education ==
A graduate of Colegio La Inmaculada Concepción in Manatí, Puerto Rico, she continued her studies at the University of Puerto Rico, where she obtained a Bachelor's Degree in Social Sciences, with specializations in Economics and Political Science. She later earned a Juris Doctor from the Interamerican University of Puerto Rico School of Law. In 1989 he completed a General Master's Degree in Law from the Pontifical Catholic University of Puerto Rico School of Law in Ponce.

== Politics ==
Was elected Representative At-large in 1984. In 1992 was selected as Speaker of the House of Representatives, being the first time in history that a woman held the highest position in the body.

Previous to being a legislator, Hernández served as a Prosecutor in the Puerto Rico Justice Department. After her tenure as Speaker of the House, Hernández served as Appellate Court Judge from 1998 to 2008. In May 2012, she became the center of a scandal when a photograph of politician Rafael Cox Alomar who was, at the time, the Popular Democratic Party's candidate for Resident Commissioner of Puerto Rico in the U.S. Congress was posted on her Twitter account comparing him to a chimpanzee and with the words "R.I.P. Yuyo". Human rights defenders criticized Hernández for the personal attack against Cox Alomar, who is of Afro-Puerto Rican ancestry, however, in statement she claimed her Twitter account was hacked and that she did not post the offensive image. She later apologized to Cox Alomar and terminated her Twitter account, promising to avoid social networks.

== See also ==
- 1996 San Juan, Puerto Rico mayoral election

House of Representatives of Puerto Rico
Preceded by Angel Viera Martínez	Puerto Rico House of Representatives, At-Large; 1985-1997	Succeeded by Iris M. Ruiz Class
Preceded by José R. Jarabo Alvarez	Speaker of the Puerto Rico House of Representatives; 1993–1996	Succeeded by Edison Misla Aldarondo
