= Puerto Rican Renewal Party =

Political party in Puerto Rico

Logo of the PRP for the 1984 election

The Puerto Rican Renewal Party — or Partido Renovación Puertorriqueña (PRP) in Spanish — was a short-lived Puerto Rican political party founded on August 28, 1983, in Ponce, Puerto Rico. The party was disbanded in 1987.

The party's main leader was then-mayor of San Juan Hernán Padilla, a pro-statehood leader and founder of the Partido Nuevo Progresista, PNP.

== History ==
=== Prelude ===
The PRP traces its origins to the 1980 election in Puerto Rico, when the pro-statehood party (in favor of making Puerto Rico the 51st state of the United States), barely retained the governorship and the Resident Commissioner position, while losing control of the Puerto Rico Senate and the Puerto Rico House of representatives, as well as a majority of the island's 78 municipalities.

After what many statehood supporters perceived as a defeat in the 1980 election, a movement started to get the New Progressive Party to nominate a new candidate for the 1984 election. Dr. Hernán Padilla's name was the favorite to substitute governor Carlos Romero Barceló at the top of the NPP's ticket in 1984.

However, Governor Romero saw the threat from Padilla and at a party assembly held in Ponce on November 14, 1982, he asked the assembled delegates if there was anyone who dared to challenge him (Romero) for the gubernatorial nomination. He did so three times, looking straight at Padilla, who was sitting at the podium. See "El Nuevo Dia," "El Mundo," "The San Juan Star," "El Reportero," and "El Vocero" (the main newspapers in Puerto Rico at the time), November 15, 1982. Padilla did not answer immediately but some time later announced that he would seek the NPP nomination for governor for the 1984 election. The escalating feud between Padilla and Romero Barceló for the NPP nomination can be followed through the newspapers of the time.

=== Founding ===
After numerous controversies between Padilla and Romero on how and when to conduct primaries to settle the dispute, and convinced that a fair primary was not possible, Padilla and his followers created the Puerto Rican Renewal Party. Some of the pro-statehood leaders who followed Padilla were:

- Ángel Viera Martínez (at-large representative in the Puerto Rico House of Representatives and vice president of the NPP, who ran for Resident Commissioner in 1984);
- Luis Batista Salas (vice-mayor of San Juan, ran for San Juan mayor in 1984);
- Ángel Rivera Salas (interagency coordinator)
- Danny López Soto (State Senator from the Carolina District, ran for an at-large seat in the Puerto Rico Senate)
- Luis Gonzalo de Jesús
- Héctor Martínez Colón

Although most PRP leaders supported statehood for Puerto Rico, they decided that their new party would seek to include people who supported other status options.

The Puerto Rican Renewal Party was formally founded on August 28, 1983, in Ponce, Puerto Rico, just a few meters from where the NPP assembly of Nov. 14, 1982 had taken place.

Despite the fact that Padilla was widely respected by the voters, in the end he received just over 4.05% of the vote, below the 5% threshold to keep the party registered.

The gubernatorial vote in 1984 was:
Rafael Hernández Colón PDP (PPD) 822,709 (47.754%)
Carlos Romero Barceló NPP (PNP) 768,959 (44.634%)
Hernán Padilla PRP (PRP) 69,807 ( 4.051%)
Fernando Martín PIP (PIP) 61,312 ( 3.558%)

(Source: State Elections Commission of the Commonwealth of Puerto Rico (Comision Estatal de Elecciones del Estado Libre Asociado de Puerto Rico); Estadisticas de las Elecciones de 1984 (Statistics of the 1984 election [in Spanish]) The Puerto Rican Renewal Party attempted to register again for the 1988 election but the effort failed for lack of support, and Padilla returned to the NPP in the Summer of 1988. The Puerto Rican Renewal Party formally dissolved in the Summer of 1987. See "El Reportero", 28 August 1987.

After the 1984 election, Padilla moved to Maryland with his family, and served in several hospitals there, reaching high positions in the medical field. He currently lives in the state of Florida.

The PRP was known as the multi-color party, because its logo was a rainbow.
