= José María Jarabo =

Spanish spree killer

- Born: José María Manuel Pablo de la Cruz Jarabo Pérez Morris; 28 April 1923; Madrid, Kingdom of Spain
- Died: 4 July 1959 (aged 36); Madrid, Francoist Spain
- Cause of death: Execution by garrote
- Children: Ronny Jarabo
- Status: Executed
- Conviction: Murder (5 counts)
- Penalty: Death

Details
- Date: 19–21 July 1958
- Location: Spain
- Killed: 5
- Date apprehended: 22 July 1958

José María Jarabo (28 April 1923 – 4 July 1959) was a Spanish spree killer, who between 19 and 21 July 1958, murdered four adults and an unborn baby. Jarabo was sentenced to death by garrote and executed in 1959.

== Early life ==
José María Manuel Pablo de la Cruz Jarabo Pérez Morris was born on 28 April 1923, in Madrid, Spain. A few years after his birth, the family moved to Miami, Florida, in the United States. Jarabo hated the United States, and it was there he committed his first crime, trafficking of human beings, for which he was arrested and sentenced to a term of three years in prison. He was confined in a psychiatric hospital in Springfield, Florida, and a few years after his release he returned to Spain, in the 1940s.

In Spain, he befriended many wealthy people and began a career as a professional gambler, using the money that his mother sent him from Puerto Rico. According to Jarabo's friends, he was a terrible gambler and spent a lot of money on poker and blackjack. In 1950, he began to drink and take drugs heavily, and as the years went by his financial situation became more dire because his mother stopped sending him money. Jarabo had a British girlfriend named Beryl Martin who wanted to sell a ring, which she gave to Jarabo, who sold it to businessmen Emilio Fernández and Félix López for a small sum. A few months later, Martin asked Jarabo to get the ring back; he decided to kill the two men instead of paying for it.

== Murders ==
On 19 July 1958, Jarabo went to Emilio Fernández's house, where a servant woman allowed him to enter after Jarabo stated he was a police inspector. Once inside, Jarabo waited for Fernández, while the servant went to the kitchen to do some housework. Planning to murder Fernández and not wanting to leave a witness, Jarabo took a clothes iron and hit the woman across the head. She tried to defend herself, but Jarabo grabbed a kitchen knife and stabbed her to death. After killing the young woman, Jarabo hid and waited for his main target. When Fernández arrived home, Jarabo shot him in the head, killing him. He then looked for the ring but did not find it. Amparo Alonso entered the house and saw Jarabo, who asked, "Who are you?" Jarabo again claimed that he was a police inspector, but the woman did not believe him and tried to run. Jarabo shot her, killing the pregnant Amparo and her unborn baby. Jarabo slept at Fernández's house overnight and returned to his hotel the next morning.

On 21 July, Jarabo went to the store where Félix López worked, hid and waited for him. When López arrived at the store, Jarabo shot him in the head, killing him.

The next day, Jarabo took a bloody suit to the dry cleaners; they promptly notified police, and a few hours later he was arrested. Jarabo was tried and convicted of all five murders, receiving the death sentence for each of them. He was executed by garrote vil on 4 July 1959.
