= Eudaldo Báez Galib =

Puerto Rican politician (1938–2026)

Member of the Puerto Rico Senate from the at-large district
- In office 1992–2008

Personal details
- Born: 22 August 1938 Mayagüez, Puerto Rico
- Died: 28 October 2026 (aged 88) San Juan, Puerto Rico
- Party: People's Party; Popular Democratic
- Other political affiliations: Democratic Party
- Spouse: Elba Rivera
- Children: 4
- Education: University of Puerto Rico (BA); University of Puerto Rico School of Law (JD)
- Profession: Politician, attorney

Eudaldo Báez Galib (22 August 1938 – 28 October 2026) was a Puerto Rican politician, who was a member of the Senate of Puerto Rico from 1993 to 2005.

== Life and career ==
Báez Galib was born in Mayagüez, Puerto Rico, on 22 August 1938. In high school, he joined Zeta Mu Gamma fraternity and was President of the fraternity in 1956 and 1958. He received a Bachelor's degree in Political Science and Economy from the University of Puerto Rico, and then graduated from the University of Puerto Rico School of Law in 1965. He was a member of Phi Sigma Alpha fraternity.

After graduating, Báez Galib worked as a private attorney from 1965 to 1985. He presided the Puerto Rico Bar Association several times, as well as being a member of the Board and president of the Civil Rights Committee.

Ran unsuccessfully for mayor of Mayagüez in the 1968 elections with the People's Party. In 1985, Governor of Puerto Rico Rafael Hernández Colón appointed him as Electoral Commissioner of the Popular Democratic Party (PPD). In 1989, he was also appointed Secretary General of the party, occupying both positions until 1992.

He was elected to the Senate of Puerto Rico for the first time at the 1992 general elections through the Minority Law of Puerto Rico. He was reelected in 1996, 2000, and 2004.

During his last term, he presided the Commission of Government and Work Affairs, Consumer Affairs, and Government Reports, among others.

Báez Galib died on 28 October 2026, at the age of 88. He was survived by his wife Elba Rivera and 4 chidren. He was buried at Cementerio Mayagüez Memorial in Mayagüez, Puerto Rico.
