= Justo A. Méndez Rodriguez =

Puerto Rican senator

Justo Alcides Méndez Rodríguez

Member of the Puerto Rico Senate from the at-large district
- In office 1968–1976

Minority Leader of the Puerto Rico Senate
- In office 1969–1972

Personal details
- Born: December 2, 1917 Lares, Puerto Rico
- Died: September 2, 1995 (aged 77) San Juan, Puerto Rico
- Party: New Progressive Party (1968–1981); Popular Democratic Party (1981–1995)
- Education: University of Puerto Rico at Mayagüez
- Occupation: Politician, senator

Military service
- Allegiance: United States of America
- Branch/service: United States Army
- Years of service: 1943-1946

Justo Alcides Méndez Rodriguez (December 2, 1917 – September 2, 1995) was a Puerto Rican politician who served as a senator in the Puerto Rico Legislature.

== Education and career ==
Mendez Rodriguez was born in Lares, Puerto Rico.

He studied Engineering at the University of Puerto Rico at Mayagüez, where he joined the Beta chapter of Phi Sigma Alpha fraternity.

He married Provi O. and had three children.

He began his career as a chemical analyst at the Central Plata in 1941, then he was chief of chemicals at the Central Los Canos, in Arecibo in 1943. He served in the United States Army from 1943 to 1946. He worked as Gen. Sipt. at Central Los Canos from 1946 to 1950. He was executive vice-president of the Central Fed. Savings & Loan Assn. from 1958 to 1964. He was president of San Martin Mortgage & investment Corp. from 1964 until 1967. He served as president of the Junta Planificacion of Arecibo, and was a member of the Junta of Corp Dirs. of Urban Renovation of Housing, and the Junta Dirs. Of the Housing Bank.

== Political career ==
Mendez Rodriguez was elected senator for the first time in 1968 as a member from the New Progressive Party (NPP). In the 1968 Senate elections he almost beat out PPD Rafael Hernandez Colon for president when the first vote in the senate was tied 12 to 12, but in the second round of votes he lost by one vote. The reason for the tie was that some PPD senators such as Lionel Fernández Méndez voted in blank.

From 1968 to 1972 he was the minority leader in the Senate, but after the 1972 elections, Carlos Romero Barcelo supported José Menéndez Monroig to be selected to that position instead. Mendez Rodriguez was also secretary of Agriculture of Puerto Rico. In 1984 he switched to the Popular Democratic Party (PDP) after a bitter internal fight with Carlos Romero. From May 22, 1986 until December 31, 1988, he was secretary of the Department of Natural and Environmental Resources. He died in September 1995 at the age of 77 in San Juan, Puerto Rico.

== See also ==
Senate of Puerto Rico
Preceded by Miguel A. García Méndez	Minority Leader of the Puerto Rico Senate; 1969–1972	Succeeded by José Menéndez Monroig
