= Severo Colberg Ramírez =

Puerto Rican politician (1924–1990)

At-Large Member of the Puerto Rico House of Representatives
- In office 1965–1968
- In office 1972–1988

Speaker of the Puerto Rico House of Representatives
- In office 1982–1985
- Preceded by: Angel Viera Martínez
- Succeeded by: José Ronaldo Jarabo

Speaker pro tempore of the House of Representatives of Puerto Rico
- In office 1973–1976
- Preceded by: José E. Salichs
- Succeeded by: José Granados Navedo

Member of the Senate of Puerto Rico
- In office 1969
- Preceded by: Rafael Durand Manzanal

Secretary of the Senate of Puerto Rico
- In office 1969
- Preceded by: Diego Román Artiguez
- Succeeded by: Tomás Ortiz McDonald

Personal details
- Born: September 16, 1924 Cabo Rojo, Puerto Rico
- Died: December 26, 1990 (aged 65–66) Bayamón, Puerto Rico
- Resting place: Buxeda Memorial Park Cemetery in Río Piedras, Puerto Rico
- Party: Popular Democratic Party (PPD)
- Spouse: Eva Toro Franquiz
- Children: Severo (b. 1953); Jorge (b. 1965)
- Education: University of Puerto Rico (BA); Harvard University (MPA)

Military service
- Allegiance: United States of America
- Branch/service: United States Army Air Forces
- Rank: Technician fourth grade

Severo E. Colberg Ramírez (September 16, 1924 – December 26, 1990) was a Puerto Rican politician. He served as a member of the Puerto Rico House of Representatives, and was the Speaker from 1982 to 1985. He was affiliated to the Popular Democratic Party (PPD).

== Early years and studies ==
Colberg Ramírez was born in Cabo Rojo on September 16, 1924. He received his bachelor's degree in social science from the University of Puerto Rico, and his master's degree in public administration from Harvard University. He worked at the University of Puerto Rico as an aide to the Dean of Administration, and as a professor and director at the Graduate School of Public Administration. Colberg Ramirez contributed as columnist for more than 20 years for several of the island's main newspapers. A selected collection of his writings was published by the House of Representatives in 2001.

== Political career ==
Colberg Ramírez was first elected to the Puerto Rico House of Representatives in 1964. He remained in that position until 1968. In 1969, he went on to occupy a seat in the Senate of Puerto Rico, filling a vacancy left by Rafael Durand Manzanal. That same year, he served as Secretary of the Senate and presided the Commission of Treasury until 1972.

In 1972, he ran again for the House of Representatives at the general election. After being elected, he served as president pro tempore of the House. He was again reelected at the 1976 general elections, and was appointed as Minority Speaker for his party. In 1982, he was elected Speaker of the House of Representatives. He served as such until 1984.

== Personal life ==
Colberg Ramírez was married to Eva Toro Fránquiz (b. 1925), also from Cabo Rojo. They had six children: Yanira (b. 1951), Severo (b. 1953), Eva (b. 1955), Esther (b. 1961), Nelson (b. 1963), and Jorge (b. 1965). Their son, Severo Colberg Toro, was a member of the House of Representatives with the PPD from 1993 to 2004. The youngest son, Jorge Colberg Toro, was also elected as a member of the House of Representatives with the PPD from 2008 to 2012. Another notable member of his family was his cousin Dr. Rebekah Colberg, known as "The Mother of Women's Sports in Puerto Rico". Colberg Ramírez died on December 26, 1990, in the city of Bayamón and was buried at the Buxeda Memorial Park Cemetery in Río Piedras, Puerto Rico. Eva Toro Fránquiz died on August 2, 2006, at the age of 81.

== See also ==
- List of Puerto Ricans

== Notes ==
House of Representatives of Puerto Rico
Preceded by Angel Viera Martínez	Speaker of the Puerto Rico House of Representatives; 1982–1985	Succeeded by José Ronaldo Jarabo
Political offices
Preceded by José E. Salichs	Speaker pro tempore of the Puerto Rico House of Representatives; 1973–1976	Succeeded by José Granados Navedo
