= Alberto Jarabo Payá =

Spanish lawyer and politician (1928–2016)

Alberto Jarabo Payá (born 1928 in Alcoy, Alicante, Spain – died 12 May 2016 in Valencia) was a Spanish lawyer and politician.

After qualifying as a lawyer in 1950, Jarabo worked as a Procurator in the Francoist parliament from 1971 to 1977. With the Falange being the only legal party in the one-party state he served as the party's national director of press and radio from 1973 to 1974. The death of Franco resulted in the Spanish transition to democracy and Jarabo joined the Popular Alliance (AP). As an AP member he was elected to the Spanish Congress of Deputies representing Valencia Province in the 1977 General Election. He was one of those who opposed the new Spanish constitution in 1978.

In 1978 he became Minister for Tourism in the government of Valencia region under José Luis Albiñana Olmos serving until 1979. In January 1979, he announced that he was retiring from politics, for personal and professional reasons. He returned to his position as a civil servant for the Central Government of Spain (as Inspector for Labour and Social Security ) until reaching the age of 65, in 1993.
