= Hernán Padilla =

Puerto Rican politician

Mayor of San Juan, Puerto Rico
- In office January 12, 1977 – January 2, 1985
- Preceded by: Carlos Romero Barceló
- Succeeded by: Baltasar Corrada del Río

42nd President of the United States Conference of Mayors
- In office 1984–1985
- Preceded by: Richard Fulton
- Succeeded by: Ernest Morial

At-Large Member of the Puerto Rico House of Representatives
- In office January 2, 1968 – January 2, 1977

Majority Leader of the Puerto Rico House of Representatives
- In office 1969–1973
- Preceded by: Ernesto Ramos Antonini
- Succeeded by: José R. Morales

Personal details
- Born: May 5, 1938 (age 88) Mayagüez, Puerto Rico
- Party: New Progressive Party (PNP); Puerto Rican Renewal Party (PRP)
- Education: University of Maryland School of Medicine (MD)

Military service
- Allegiance: United States of America
- Branch/service: Army National Guard; United States Army Reserve
- Years of service: 1954–1987 ARNG; 1987–1993 USAR
- Rank: Coronel

Hernán Padilla Ramírez (born May 5, 1938) is an American politician who served as mayor of San Juan, Puerto Rico.

== Biography ==
Padilla graduated from the University of Maryland School of Medicine in 1963. After training as a nephrologist, he entered private practice and joined the Puerto Rico National Guard in 1954 and transferred in 1987 to the United States Army Reserve in Fort Meade Maryland. He was sent to active duty during the Gulf War and assigned to Walter Reed Army Medical Center. Padilla retired from the military service in 1993. In 1967, he became politically active, participating in the pro-statehood campaign leading to the July 27 political status plebiscite, as a leader of Estadistas Unidos (Statehooders United), a non-partisan group founded by long-time Statehood Republican Party gubernatorial candidate Luis A. Ferré. On August 20, 1967, at the assembly in Carolina, Puerto Rico at which the organization was dissolved, Padilla and other party leaders proposed the creation of a new political party that would eventually be known as the New Progressive Party (NPP) or Partido Nuevo Progresista (PNP) in Spanish.

In January, 1969 and after the NPP's electoral triumph and his own election as a state representative, in spite of being a freshman, Padilla was selected as House Majority Leader for the 1969–1973 term. After the NPP's defeat in 1972 and his own reelection, he served as Minority Whip until 1977. In 1976, he won the NPP nomination for mayor of San Juan after a three-way competition with attorney Baltasar Corrada del Río and Senator Sila Nazario, and was elected to the post in November of that year, succeeding newly elected Governor Carlos Romero Barceló and Carlos S. Quirós who served a days-long stint as mayor following Romero's swearing-in as governor and the official beginning of the 1977–1981 term. His term as mayor was marked by a major expansion of sports and community facilities and the first attempt to wrestle with San Juan's looming solid waste crisis. He also served as President of the U.S. Conference of Mayors, being the first Hispanic in that position. Hernan Padilla built the San Juan's Municipal Tower in Hato Rey, San Juan's Central Park, the Pedrin Zorilla Coliseum, Paseo de Diego, and others installations. He also created San Juan's Municipal police department.

Reelected as mayor in 1980, Padilla became increasingly dissatisfied with Romero and the incumbent governor's capacity to lead the party to another victory in 1984 after barely winning reelection by less than one-half of one percent margin in 1980. The tensions between both leaders led to Padilla splitting from the NPP and creating the Puerto Rican Renewal Party (PRP), and aspiring for governor under the PRP banner. Pro-statehood votes in 1984 were split between the PRP and the NPP, which renominated Romero, resulting in the Popular Democratic Party return to power, through the election to an unprecedented non-consecutive second term, of Rafael Hernández Colón as governor.

After 1984, Padilla returned to medical practice as a nephrologist, serving with the National Capital Area for Kaiser Permanente. In 1991 he was the subject of one television advertisement by Kaiser that was regularly aired across the United States.

Padilla channelled his post-1984 political energies through national initiatives, serving as chairman for the US Council for Puerto Rico Statehood (USCPRS). He has rejoined the NPP and was the surprise keynote speaker at the party's August 2010 convention in Río Grande, Puerto Rico, at the invitation of party president, Gov. Luis Fortuño, who considers Padilla one of his mentors.

Padilla now lives in Miramar, Florida. He is a member of Fraternidad Fi Sigma Alfa since 1956.

In 2009, Padilla was appointed to represent the Puerto Rico House of Representatives on the five-member board of directors of the Puerto Rico Public-Private Partnerships Authority that regulates public-private partnerships in Puerto Rico.

Padilla writes a weekly column in the largest circulation newspaper in Puerto Rico, El Nuevo Dia, about current political, ideological, economic and administrative issues in Puerto Rico. He also writes a column for El Sentinel, a Spanish weekly publication of the Sun Sentinel in South Florida.

House of Representatives of Puerto Rico
Preceded by Ernesto Ramos Antonini	Majority Leader of the Puerto Rico House of Representatives; 1969–1973	Succeeded by José R. Morales
Preceded by Olga Cruz de Nigaglioni	Minority Whip of the Puerto Rico House of Representatives; 1973–1977	Succeeded by José R. Jarabo Alvarez
Political offices
Preceded by Carlos Romero Barceló	Mayor of San Juan, Puerto Rico; 1977–1985	Succeeded by Baltasar Corrada del Río
