= Ronny Jarabo =

Puerto Rican politician (1940–2025)

24th Speaker of the Puerto Rico House of Representatives
- In office January 2, 1985 – January 2, 1993
- Governor: Rafael Hernández Colón
- Preceded by: Severo Colberg Ramírez
- Succeeded by: Zaida R. Hernández Torres

Majority Leader of the Puerto Rico House of Representatives
- In office 1982–1985
- Preceded by: José Granados
- Succeeded by: Presby Santiago García

At-Large Member of the Puerto Rico House of Representatives
- In office January 2, 1973 – January 2, 1993

Personal details
- Born: José Ronaldo Jarabo Álvarez; April 7, 1940 Cayey, Puerto Rico
- Died: June 29, 2025 (aged 85) Río Piedras, Puerto Rico
- Resting place: Capital Municipal Cemetery in Río Piedras, Puerto Rico
- Party: PPD
- Spouse: Teresa Bengoa
- Parent: José María Jarabo (father)
- Education: University of Puerto Rico (BA); University of Puerto Rico School of Law (JD)

José Ronaldo Jarabo Álvarez (April 7, 1940 – June 29, 2025) was a Puerto Rican politician from Cayey. He was the Speaker of the Puerto Rico House of Representatives from 1985 to 1992, having served as a member of that legislative body for twenty years, from 1973 to 1992.

== Life and career ==
Jarabo was married to Teresa Bengoa. He had a BA in political science from the University of Puerto Rico. He also earned a law degree from the University of Puerto Rico School of Law in 1972.

His father, José María Jarabo, was executed in Spain on July 4, 1959, for four murders committed in 1958.

In 1992, Jarabo was involved in a scandal when he went to the apartment of former beauty queen Elizabeth Zayas and her husband, Frank Kolodziej, to confront him on an alleged extramarital relationship he was having with Bengoa, Jarabo's wife. Jarabo was accused on several charges, including assault.

Jarabo died from complications related to a brain tumor on June 29, 2025 in Río Piedras, Puerto Rico, at the age of 85. He was buried at the Capital Municipal Cemetery in Río Piedras, Puerto Rico.

House of Representatives of Puerto Rico
Preceded by José Granados	Majority Leader of the Puerto Rico House of Representatives; 1982–1985	Succeeded by Presby Santiago García
Political offices
Preceded by Severo Colberg Ramírez	Speaker of the Puerto Rico House of Representatives; 1985–1993	Succeeded by Zaida R. Hernández Torres
