= Luis Dávila Colón =

Puerto Rican journalist (born 1952)

- Born: March 4, 1952 (age 74); Cidra, Puerto Rico
- Education: Marquette University (BA); University of Puerto Rico School of Law (JD)
- Occupations: Political analyst Radio host lawyer

Luis Dávila Colón (born March 4, 1952) is a Puerto Rican political radio commentator.

His daily radio talk show, which was broadcast for a decade, until December 2009, from 4:30 to 7:00 pm by the NotiUno 1280 radio network moved to Univision Radio WKAQ-AM in 2010. His twice-weekly columns ran for years in El Vocero daily newspaper, where he serves as an editorial consultant. These mediums provide a wide audience for his political analysis. Since 1988, he has run WKAQ-TV Telemundo's political broadcasts during the election year and has been the principal analyst during election night coverage.

An attorney born in Cidra, Puerto Rico, Dávila Colón is of counsel at the Castellanos & Castellanos law firm in San Juan and Washington, DC. He has associated with economist Carlos Colón De Armas to provide political and economic strategic analysis to corporate clients.

Shortly after obtaining his B.A. cum laude from Marquette University in 1974 and his J.D. at the University of Puerto Rico School of Law, where he served as associate editor of the UPR Law Review from 1976 to 1977, he was the editor of Breakthrough from Colonialism, An Interdisciplinary Study of Statehood, published by the UPR Press and considered by Library of Congress experts as the definitive study on the statehood admissions process in the United States. The multi-year multi-disciplinary research project that preceded publication involved a dozen talented young professionals who went on to assume roles in government, the judiciary and the private sector, including Appellate Court Judge Nélida Jiménez and former Corrections Administrator and current Government Ethics Office Director Zulma Rosario. Dávila Colón supports statehood for Puerto Rico.

Since publishing that book, he has authored nearly a dozen additional books, many of which have held the number one spot in the best-seller lists for the Puerto Rico market. One recent example is Justicia Roja, an exposé of Puerto Rico's judicial and prosecutorial systems, which has sold 15,000 copies in the Puerto Rico bookselling market. His most recent book Estado Patria sold 8,000 copies in its first month of sales.

Dávila was also the Vice President and News Director of WSJN Channel 24, in the late 1980s, the only all-news TV station in Puerto Rico's broadcast history. He is a statehood activist from the New Progressive Party, writes books against the opposite party and he gets paid for the radio podcast he does.

Luis Dávila currently broadcast daily in social media Platforms where thousands of fans listen to him on a daily basis.

== Other activities ==
For the 2008 election period, he hosted a TV show called Esto esta Cañón, Fridays on WKAQ Telemundo.

Also, 2008 saw his debut on stage. He adapted his aggressive analytic tone into a stand-up comedy to the theatre in a show called " Los Electores los prefieren Morones". On his radio show he has proclaimed that he is the first ever political analyst to take his analytic points of view from radio to the 7th art.

On his radio show, he has claimed that his show has been censored in both Centro de Bellas Artes in San Juan and in Ponce's La Perla Theatre. He said he will go to court and challenge the censorship. Even though his books frequently appear on best-seller lists published by newspapers, they are rarely listed.

He is frequently invited to share his political analysis as a speaker before civic groups.
