= Héctor Luis Acevedo =

Former mayor of San Juan, Puerto Rico

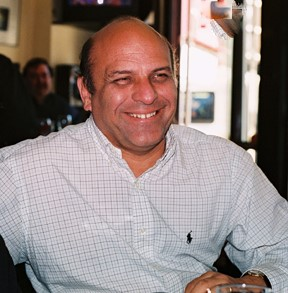

Mayor of San Juan
- In office January 2, 1989 – January 2, 1997
- Preceded by: Baltasar Corrada del Río
- Succeeded by: Sila Calderón

Secretary of State of Puerto Rico
- In office 1985–1988
- Governor: Rafael Hernández Colón
- Preceded by: Carlos S. Quirós
- Succeeded by: Alfonso Lopez Char

Personal details
- Born: Héctor Luis Acevedo Pérez; November 8, 1947 (age 78) San Juan, Puerto Rico
- Party: Popular Democratic
- Other political affiliations: Democratic
- Spouse: Carmen Roca Savedra
- Education: University of Puerto Rico, Río Piedras (BA, JD); Georgetown University (attended)

Military service
- Branch/service: United States Army
- Years of service: 1972–1998
- Rank: Lieutenant Colonel
- Unit: United States Army Reserve

Héctor Luis Acevedo Pérez (born November 8, 1947) is a Puerto Rican politician from Río Piedras, San Juan, Puerto Rico. He is the son of Héctor N. Acevedo and Toñita Pérez, both public servants. Acevedo has been married to Carmen Roca Saavedra since 1972, with whom he has three children.

== Biography ==
Héctor Luis studied in the University of Puerto Rico Elementary School and High School but completed High School in Spain in the America School of Madrid. There he won the Director's Cup and the medal in history. He completed a bachelor's degree in political science at the University of Puerto Rico with high honors. He obtained his degree in law from the University of Puerto Rico at Ponce in 1972, where he also graduated with honors. Acevedo then entered the United States Army Reserve as a commissioned officer after completing the Army ROTC program. As part of his military functions, he was an instructor in the United States Army Command and General Staff College. Also commanded the 429 Personnel Company. Acevedo retired from the Army Reserve in 1998. While in university he was elected president of the student council, president of the Alpha Phi Omega fraternity, and in 1967, Lodge Chief of Yokahu Lodge of the Order of the Arrow of the Boy Scouts of America, Puerto Rico Council; was also recognized with the Vigil Honor.

In 1976, he was appointed Electoral Commissioner when he was only twenty-eight years old, making him the youngest person to hold that position. He remained as Electoral Commissioner until 1984. In 1978, he completed the Lawyer's Education Program at the Harvard Law School. That same year he began working as an assistant to then-Governor Rafael Hernández Colón.

In 1985 he was appointed Secretary of State. In 1988, he was elected mayor of San Juan in a close race. He was reelected in 1992 by a much larger margin. In 1994, he was elected president of the Popular Democratic Party, and in 1996 he ran unsuccessfully for governor of Puerto Rico, losing by a 51% to 45% margin to Pedro Rosselló. Since then he has dedicated his time to teaching full time at the Interamerican University of Puerto Rico. He is also a part-time professor at the Pontifical Catholic University of Puerto Rico School of Law. Considered Gov. Jesús T. Piñero's principal biographer, he is also contributing to the biography of former Puerto Rico Senate Vice President Luis Negrón López, the PDP's 1968 gubernatorial candidate.

He was vice president of the Puerto Rico Council of the Boy Scouts of America.

In 2003 and in 2013, he was appointed President of the Commission for Electoral Finance Reform. Acevedo is known to be an expert in Puerto Rican electoral law.

Currently he lives in Rio Piedras, where he occasionally plays basketball with his youngest son.

== Publications ==
Héctor Luis Acevedo has published various articles in law journals and newspapers. In 1996, he published his book Will Opens Paths ("La Voluntad Abre Caminos"), and in 1997 Messages from the Mayor's Office ("Mensajes Desde la Alcaldia"). He has edited two books: La Generacion del 40 y la Convencion Constituyente and Los Administradores en la Modernizacion de Puerto Rico. He is also the editor of the Interamerican University of Puerto Rico-sponsored biography on Gov. Jesús T. Piñero. He also edited the biography of Sen. Luis Negrón López, published by the Interamerican University Press in September 2007.

Many of these books have been made available for free online on the Interamerican University of Puerto Rico's website on the libros para todos (books for everybody) section.

Political offices
Preceded by Carlos S. Quirós	Secretary of State of Puerto Rico; 1985–1988	Succeeded by Alfonso Lopez Char
Preceded by Baltasar Corrada del Río	Mayor of San Juan; 1989–1997	Succeeded by Sila María Calderón
Party political offices
Preceded by Victoria Muñoz Mendoza	Chair of the Puerto Rico Popular Democratic Party; 1994–1997	Succeeded by Sila María Calderón
Preceded by Victoria Muñoz Mendoza	Popular Democratic nominee for Governor of Puerto Rico; 1996	Succeeded by Sila María Calderón
