= Aníbal Acevedo Vilá =

Puerto Rican politician (born 1962)

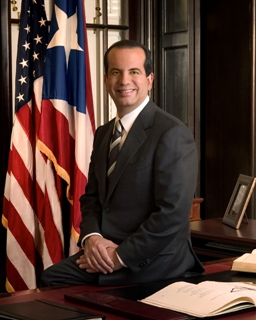
- Acevedo Vilá in 2005

Governor of Puerto Rico
- In office 2 January 2005 – 2 January 2009
- Preceded by: Sila María Calderón
- Succeeded by: Luis Fortuño

17th Resident Commissioner of Puerto Rico
- In office 3 January 2001 – 2 January 2005
- Preceded by: Carlos Romero Barceló
- Succeeded by: Luis Fortuño

Minority Leader of the Puerto Rico House of Representatives
- In office January 1997 – January 2001
- Preceded by: Severo Colberg Toro
- Succeeded by: Víctor García San Inocencio

Member of the Puerto Rico House of Representatives from the at-large district
- In office January 1993 – January 2001

Personal details
- Born: Aníbal Salvador Acevedo Vilá; 13 February 1962 (age 64) Hato Rey, Puerto Rico
- Party: Popular Democratic
- Other political affiliations: Democratic
- Spouse: Piti Gándara (died 2023)
- Children: 2
- Education: University of Puerto Rico, Río Piedras (BA, JD); Harvard University (LLM)

Aníbal Salvador Acevedo Vilá (born 13 February 1962) is a Puerto Rican politician and lawyer who served as the governor of Puerto Rico from 2005 to 2009.

He is a Harvard University alumnus (LL.M. 1987) and a graduate of the University of Puerto Rico School of Law, where he obtained his Juris Doctor degree. Acevedo Vilá has held various public service positions in the Puerto Rico government under the Popular Democratic Party, serving as a member of the House of Representatives of Puerto Rico (1993–2001) and as the 17th Resident Commissioner (2001–2005), before he was sworn in as Governor on 2 January 2005. Acevedo Vilá was also a member of the National Governors Association, the Southern Governors' Association and the Democratic Governors Association, and a collaborator on Barack Obama's presidential campaign.

He is currently an adjunct professor of the University of Puerto Rico School of Law. He unsuccessfully ran for Resident Commissioner of Puerto Rico in the 2020 elections for the Popular Democratic Party.

On 27 March 2008, Acevedo Vilá was indicted in the U.S. District Court for the District of Puerto Rico on 19 counts of campaign finance violations. He subsequently organized a press conference, where he claimed that he is innocent of all charges presented against him. On 19 August 2008, he was charged with five more counts. On 1 December 2008 Judge Paul Barbadoro determined that 15 of those charges were based on a flawed theory, leaving him with only nine charges. On 20 March 2009, Acevedo Vilá was found not guilty of all the charges against him.

On 4 November 2008, he failed in his bid for a second term, losing to incumbent Resident Commissioner Luis Fortuño. Two days later he stepped down as president of the Popular Democratic Party.

Since 2009 he has served as the chief executive officer of the Optim Group.

== Early life and education ==
Acevedo Vilá was born in Hato Rey, Puerto Rico, a district of San Juan. His father, the late Salvador Acevedo, was a former judge, while his mother, the late Elba Vilá Salas, was a homemaker. He attended Colegio San José High School in the same municipality. In 1982, he obtained a Bachelor of Arts in Political Science and Government at the University of Puerto Rico at Rio Piedras. He continued his studies in law at that campus' University of Puerto Rico Law School, the preeminent law school of Puerto Rico and the Caribbean, from which he obtained his Juris Doctor in 1985, graduating magna cum laude.

After passing the Puerto Rico bar exam, Acevedo Vilá completed a year-long clerkship at the Supreme Court of Puerto Rico, where he worked under associate Justice Federico Hernández Denton. In 1987, he obtained a LL.M. degree from Harvard Law School. From 1987 to 1988, he served as law clerk for the Hon. Levin Hicks Campbell, Chief Judge of the U.S. Court of Appeals for the First Circuit in Boston, Massachusetts.

== Political career ==
=== Early career ===
Acevedo Vilá began his political career in 1989 as Legislative Affairs Advisor to Governor Rafael Hernández Colón. Shortly after, he became Director of the Legislative Affairs Office of La Fortaleza. He was also responsible for the analysis and drafting of legislative measures like the Education Reform and the Municipal Reform legislation.

=== House of Representatives (1992–1999) ===
In 1992, Acevedo Vilá was elected Representative At-Large to the Puerto Rico's House of Representatives. His parliamentary work was mostly in the commissions of Government, Retirement System, Women Affairs, and others. In 1993, he was an active member of the PPD campaign in favor of the current commonwealth status for the plebiscite held in the island on 14 November 1993. In the end, the Commonwealth, or Estado Libre Asociado, beat the other options of statehood and independence.

Acevedo Vilá was reelected as Representative in 1996. That same year, Party President Héctor Luis Acevedo also put him in charge of the Status Committee of the party. The following year, his party elected him Minority Leader of the House. To continue his ascension in the Party ranks, in February 1997, Acevedo Vilá ran for President of the Popular Democratic Party against veteran Eudaldo Báez Galib, and won 180–124.

==== Young Bill and 1998 Plebiscite ====
In 1998, Acevedo Vilá participated in a campaign against the Young Bill, a proposed legislative project in the U.S. Congress that sought to resolve the political status of Puerto Rico by defining each proposed status option and calling for a series of referendums. Although the referendum called for in the project would have included the option for Puerto Rico to remain a Commonwealth, the option would have to be renewed by island voters every ten years, until they opted for independence or statehood.

Although the project was not approved, Puerto Rico's elected officials under Governor Pedro Rosselló organized a non-binding plebiscite to define Puerto Rico's political status, in which Puerto Ricans were given five options: Commonwealth, associated republic, Statehood, Independence from the United States, or "none of the above".

Acevedo Vilá and his party believed the definition of the commonwealth option was incorrect because it defined the current political status as territorial. His party campaigned for the "none of the above" option, which ultimately garnered the majority of the votes. (See 1998 Puerto Rican status referendum for more information.)

=== Resident commissioner (2000–2004) ===
In 1999, Acevedo Vilá became vice-president of the PPD, as the current mayor of San Juan, Sila Calderón assumed the presidency and became the candidate for Governor of Puerto Rico. Acevedo Vilá settled to be the candidate for the resident commissioner position, but he was challenged by José Alfredo Hernández Mayoral, son of former governor and Acevedo Vilá's mentor, Rafael Hernández Colón. Acevedo Vilá won the primary held on 14 November 1999 with 54% of the votes. The next year, Acevedo Vilá defeated Carlos Romero Barceló, the incumbent resident commissioner, while Sila Calderón became the first female governor of Puerto Rico, defeating the PNP candidate, Carlos Pesquera.

Acevedo was sworn in at the Washington Capitol Building on 3 January 2001. Among the legislative measures helmed by Acevedo were the assignment of equal funds for education and the Medicare program in Puerto Rico.

In mid-2003, Governor Sila M. Calderón announced she would not seek a second term on the following year's elections. José Hernández Mayoral again surfaced as the likely party's candidate for governor for the 2004 elections. The Party General Council agreed and decided to put Acevedo to run for Mayor of San Juan. However, months following the announcement, Hernández Mayoral withdrew from the race, citing personal matters, and Acevedo Vilá announced he would run for the governor's seat. On 14 August, he was again elected as president of the party.

=== Governor (2005–2009) ===
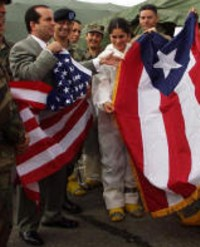
Governor Acevedo Vilá holding the American flag

Acevedo Vilá won the Puerto Rico General Elections of 2004 with the help of a partisan supreme court, by approximately 3,880 votes (0.2 percent of the vote), over former governor Pedro Rosselló. However, since the margin of victory was so small, a full recount of the elections took place. During the period, Rosselló filed a civil lawsuit against Acevedo Vilá himself over a dispute of certain ballots that were cast during the elections. Many melones voted for Governor Anibal Acevedo Vilá because they did not want the statehood candidate to win the tight race.

==== Mixed votes controversy ====
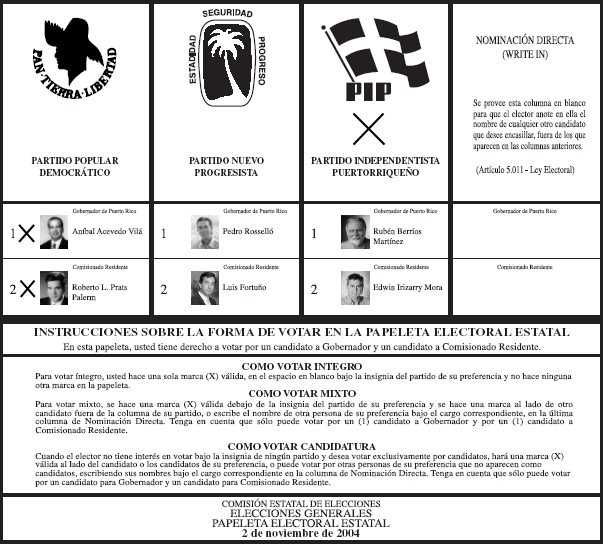
Sample ballot for 2004 Gubernatorial Election, illustrating the Mixed Vote permissible under CEE Rule 50

Since Acevedo Vilá's margin of victory was just 3,880 votes, less than one vote per electoral polling room, the result led to a protracted controversy involving appeals to the United States federal courts and the Supreme Court of Puerto Rico. The leaders of the New Progressive Party alleged that some ballots were invalid and should not be counted.

The controversy reached the Supreme Court of Puerto Rico, which ruled 4–3 that the ballots in question were valid. Rosselló challenged the ballots on the United States District Court for the District of Puerto Rico, where District Judge Daniel Domínguez ordered the Puerto Rico Election Commission to count the disputed votes but not adjudicate them to any candidate until he reached a decision on the merits of the case. Acevedo-Vilá and his team challenged this ruling and the case moved up to the United States Court of Appeals for the First Circuit, where three judges ruled the question of whether or not the ballots were properly cast was not a federal constitutional issue and therefore should be decided by the Supreme Court of Puerto Rico at the Commonwealth level. The Supreme Court affirmed its prior 4–3 decision. On 28 December 2004 the recount ended and Acevedo Vilá was certified as winner and therefore elected governor.

==== Shared government ====
Acevedo Vilá was finally sworn as Governor on 2 January 2005. During his term, he faced many political challenges, due to the fact that the main opposing party, New Progressive Party (NPP) gained control of the Legislative Assembly of Puerto Rico, the Resident Commissioner in Congress (Luis Fortuño), and Acevedo Vilá's main political rival, Pedro Rosselló (former Governor or Puerto Rico who had just lost the election against Acevedo), managed to gain a seat in the Senate of Puerto Rico after a young first-term Senator from Arecibo unexpectedly resigned shortly after taking the oath of office, and unsuccessfully attempted to topple Senate President Kenneth McClintock.

Because the executive and the legislative branches of the government are controlled by different political parties, Governor Acevedo Vilá called his government a "shared government". During the first months of his term, Acevedo Vilá concentrated his efforts on trying to reach bipartisan support for his bills and for the nominees of his Cabinet. However, this collapsed when Acevedo Vilá vetoed a legislative bill proposed by the NPP, although all members of his Cabinet, but one, were confirmed by the Senate.

During May 2005, confrontations between the executive and the legislative branches reached a new climax when the Puerto Rico legislature voted to override a veto by Acevedo Vilá, thus becoming the first democratically elected governor to have a veto overridden by the legislature. Later in June, Acevedo Vilá and the legislature were frequently at odds about the budget proposal. The budget proposed by the Governor was not accepted by the leaders of the PNP in the legislature and they proposed a different budget, which Acevedo Vilá vetoed in August 2005. As a result, for the first time ever, the previous year's budget remained in force.

During his 2004 campaign, he promised that he would not support a sales tax. The tax was proposed to pay part of the commonwealth's external debt. In spite of all these measures, he was unable to finish his term with a balanced budget. During his term as governor he relied on greater trade with foreign countries. He was also the only governor to speak to the United Nations on the political status of Puerto Rico.

==== Government shut-down ====
New tensions surfaced during April 2006, when Acevedo Vilá announced the central government of Puerto Rico did not have enough funds to pay the salary of public employees for the months of May and June. The Governor asked the Legislature to approve a loan of over $500 million so that the government could keep the agencies running. The Senate approved the loan, but the House of Representatives refused to do so. Acevedo Vilá then announced that most of the government agencies would shut down beginning 1 May, and would remain closed unless the House approved the new loan. The government shutdown lasted two weeks, until Governor Acevedo Vilá, the president of the Senate Kenneth McClintock and the Speaker of the House José Aponte-Hernández reached an agreement to end the shutdown. The details of the agreement included the approval of a new loan as well as new fiscal reforms that would, eliminate the 6.6% general excise tax, replace it with a 7% sales tax and require the reduction of operational costs of the central government of the islands.

=== Failed attempt at reelection (2008) ===
During the course of 2008, Acevedo Vilá was indicted with a total of 24 charges of corruption. Due to this situation and the economic crisis hampering his tenure, several potential candidates like William Miranda Marín (Mayor of Caguas) and Alejandro García Padilla (former secretary of the Department of Consumer Affairs and candidate to the Senate) were mentioned as possible replacements. However, Acevedo Vilá decided to run for reelection, and was openly endorsed by the party in a massive rally held at the José Miguel Agrelot Coliseum.

Sometime after, he chose the president of the Puerto Rico Government Development Bank Alfredo Salazar as his running mate for the position of Resident Commissioner. The final rally of the Popular Democratic Party campaign looked like a massive gathering at the parking lot of one of the stations of the Tren Urbano as reported by press. Despite this final push, Acevedo Vilá was defeated by Fortuño by 224,894 votes, being the PPD candidate defeated by the largest margin in Puerto Rico's history. Shortly after, Acevedo Vilá announced his resignation as president of the party.

=== Failed run for Resident Commissioner (2020) ===
In 2020 Acevedo Vilá announced he would again run for the post of resident commissioner. He ran unopposed in the primaries after other candidates failed the secure the necessary endorsements. Polls indicated he was almost ten points behind the incumbent Jenniffer González. The election results confirmed these surveys, with Acevedo Vilá receiving 32% of the vote and being defeated by a margin of nine points.

== Federal investigations and indictment ==
During the period of September–October 2006, several news sources reported that a federal grand jury was investigating donations made to the Acevedo Vilá campaign fund during 2001 and 2002 by the aforementioned contractor and a Puerto Rico-based associate. News sources indicated that the donations made by the duo to the Acevedo Vilá campaign fund during that period could total $68,000. In the succeeding months, several key members of Acevedo Vilá's Cabinet were either interviewed by the FBI or called to testify before the Grand Jury investigating the Governor, including Fortaleza Chief of Staff and former Economic Development and Commerce Secretary Jorge Silva Puras, Press Secretary Juanita Colombani, former Housing Secretary Ileana Echegoyen, former Health Services Administrator Nancy Vega, and former Fortaleza Chief of Staff Aníbal José Torres.

On 27 March 2008, Acevedo Vilá was formally charged in the long-running public corruption probe, along with 12 other people. The 13 were accused of running a conspiracy to illegally raise money to pay off Acevedo Vilá's campaign debts in 2000. Acevedo Vilá was not arrested. Acting U.S. Attorney Rosa Emilia Rodríguez said, "The governor will be permitted to turn himself in [in] deference to his position."

The following day Acevedo Vilá was released without having to pay bail nor give up his passport. Acevedo Vilá was allowed to travel out of the island so long as he informed the court prior to doing so.

On 19 August 2008, the federal agency filed a second five count federal Grand Jury indictment.

Throughout the investigation and indictment process, Acevedo Vilá stated repeatedly that he was innocent, and claimed that everything was politically motivated to harm his career.

On 1 December 2008, Judge Paul Barbadoro dismissed 15 of the original 19 charges citing misinterpretation of Puerto Rican election laws by the federal prosecutors. Thirteen co defendants pleaded guilty and testified. His executive secretary, Luisa Inclán Bird was put on trial with him after the Federal District attorney attempted to have separate trials. Witness testified that Inclán Bird served as the person that collected monies and imparted instructions. She was defended by the same legal team from Acevedo Vila and did not have to pay any dues.

The case was heard between 9 February 2009 until 20 March 2009. Acevedo Vila was found not guilty of all charges on 20 March 2009.

== Political position ==
He positions himself in favor of the elimination of the Puerto Rico Supervisory Board. He is a supporter of Sovereignty in Free Association with the United States.

== Personal life ==
Acevedo Vilá was married to Luisa Gándara, a schoolteacher and information technology executive who gave up her career to serve as First Lady during his governorship and later served as a member of Puerto Rico's House of Representatives. They are the parents of two young adults, one a Harvard graduate and a UPR-educated school teacher, and live in San Juan, where he currently practices law and has authored several books related to his political career and years in public service. Gándara died from cancer on 14 June 2023.

== See also ==
- List of governors of Puerto Rico
- Young Bill
- List of Hispanic Americans in the United States Congress
- Popular Democratic Party
- New Progressive Party
- Puerto Rican Independence Party

House of Representatives of Puerto Rico
Preceded by Severo Colberg Toro	Minority Leader of the Puerto Rico House of Representatives; 1997–2001	Succeeded by Edison Misla Aldarondo
U.S. House of Representatives
Preceded by Carlos Romero Barceló	Resident Commissioner of Puerto Rico; 2001–2005	Succeeded by Luis Fortuño
Party political offices
Preceded by Sila María Calderón	Chair of the Puerto Rico Popular Democratic Party; 2003–2008	Succeeded by Héctor Ferrer
Preceded by Sila María Calderón	Popular Democratic nominee for Governor of Puerto Rico; 2004, 2008	Succeeded by Alejandro García Padilla
Political offices
Preceded by Sila María Calderón	Governor of Puerto Rico; 2005–2009	Succeeded by Luis Fortuño
