= 2004 Puerto Rican general election =

- November 2, 2004
- Gubernatorial election
- Turnout: 81.57%
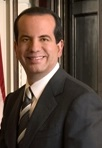

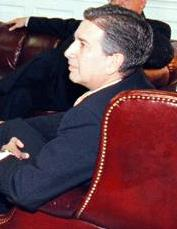
Nominee	Aníbal Acevedo Vilá	Pedro Rosselló
Party	Popular Democratic	New Progressive
Alliance	Democratic	Democratic
Popular vote	963,303	959,737
Percentage	48.62%	48.44%
- Results by municipality Acevedo Vilá: 40–50% 50–60% Rosselló: 40–50% 50–60% 60–70%
Governor before election
Sila María Calderón
Popular Democratic
Elected Governor
Aníbal Acevedo Vilá
Popular Democratic
- Resident Commissioner election
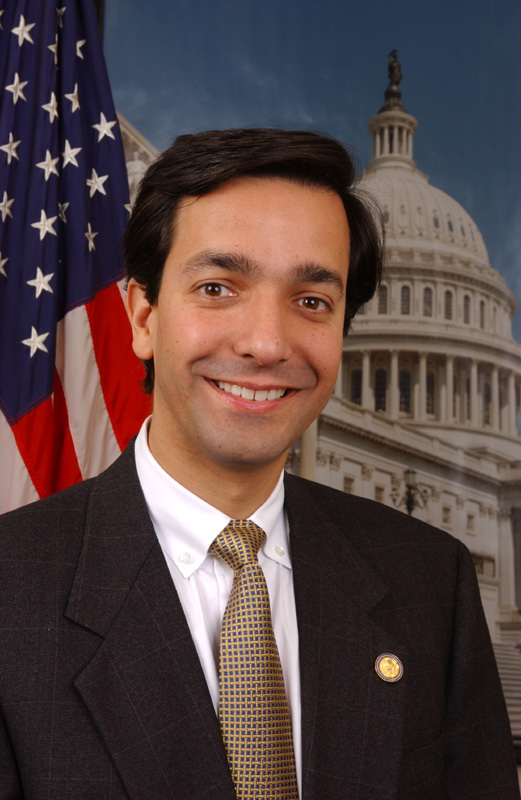
Nominee	Luis Fortuño	Roberto Prats
Party	New Progressive	Popular Democratic
Alliance	Republican	Democratic
Popular vote	956,828	945,691
Percentage	48.83%	48.26%
- Results by municipality Fortuño: 40–50% 50–60% 60–70% Prats: 40–50% 50–60%

General elections were held in Puerto Rico on Tuesday, November 2, 2004. After a count by the State Commission of Elections, the winner was inaugurated to a four-year term as Governor of Puerto Rico on January 2, 2005.

The post of Governor of Puerto Rico and the entire House of Representatives and the entire Senate, as well as the Mayors of the municipalities of Puerto Rico, and the Resident Commissioner were also elected for four-year terms.

For the first time in Puerto Rican history, citizens unable to mobilize to voting colleges for medical reasons, but capable of practicing their right to vote, were visited in their own homes and hospitals so that they could exercise their vote.

== Candidates ==
=== Governor ===
- Aníbal Acevedo Vilá for the Popular Democratic Party
- Pedro Rosselló for the New Progressive Party
- Ruben Berrios for the Puerto Rican Independence Party

=== Resident Commissioner ===
- Edwin Irizarry Mora for the Puerto Rican Independence Party
- Luis Fortuño for the New Progressive Party
- Roberto Prats for the Popular Democratic Party

== Results ==
Results were announced by the State Commission of Elections (CEE-PUR) on November 2–3, 2004 after the voting colleges closed on November 2 at 3:00 p.m. AST.

On November 3, after 1,970,759 votes (98.3% of the total votes) were computed, Aníbal Acevedo Vilá (PPD) was certified preliminarily as winning for Governor of Puerto Rico. On the other hand, Luis Fortuño (PNP) was certified as Resident Commissioner, while the Senate and the House of Representatives were also dominated by the New Progressive Party.

The preliminary certification was signed by Gerardo Cruz, electoral commissioner of the Popular Democratic Party (PPD), Brunilda Ortiz, alternate electoral commissioner of the New Progressive Party (PNP), and Andrés Miranda Rosa, alternate electoral commissioner of the Puerto Rican Independence Party (PIP). The alternate commissioners were authorized by the electoral commissioners in property of their party, Thomas Rivera Schatz (PNP) and Juan Dalmau (PIP).

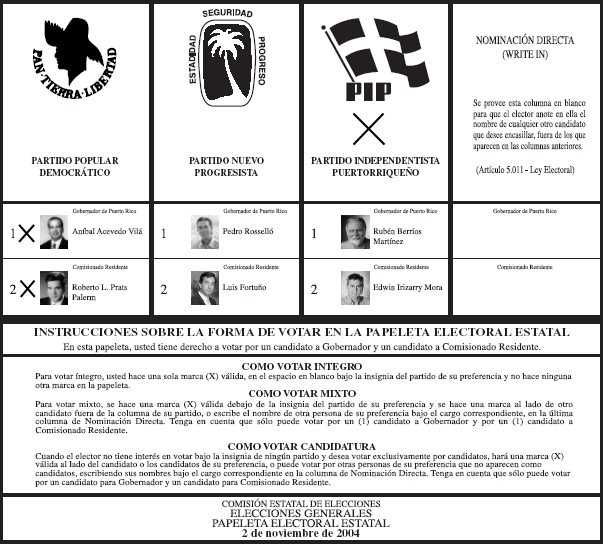
Sample ballot for 2004 Gubernatorial Election, illustrating the mixed vote permissible under CEE Rule 50.

Acevedo Vilá's margin of victory over Pedro Rosselló was of 3,566 (0.2%) votes, whereas Luis Fortuño had 11,137 (0.49%) votes of advantage against Roberto Prats for Resident Commissioner. Due to the small margin of victory being, the Puerto Rican electoral laws state that a recount must be performed, and that once this recount is finished, the official winner will be certified by the CEE-PUR. The recount started on Monday, November 9 as established by law, and had to finish by December 31 or earlier.

During the period, Rosselló filed a civil lawsuit against Acevedo Vilá himself over a dispute of certain ballots that were cast during the elections. This led to a protracted controversy involving appeals to the United States federal courts and the Supreme Court of Puerto Rico. The ballots in question were cast by marking the Puerto Rican Independence Party or New Progressive Party (i.e. marking a cross under the emblem of one of these parties) in addition to placing individual candidate marks (crosses) in favor of Acevedo Vilá as the candidate for governor of the Popular Democratic Party and Roberto Prats, the Popular Democratic Party's candidate for Resident Commissioner. The mark indicating the selection of a political party selects that party's slate of candidates by default, but the voter can also select individual candidates from other parties to replace candidates from the default slate.

The controversy reached the Supreme Court of Puerto Rico, which ruled 4–3 that the ballots in question were valid. In its initial opinion, the Supreme Court majority interpreted the challenged ballots as indicating that voters were voting for the PIP as a party for the purposes of stating party affiliation (and for the PIP's default slate) but had decided to move their votes to individual candidates from other party's slates. This type of vote, described as a "mixed vote", is permitted in Rule 50 of the State Election Commission's rules, based on the Commonwealth's Electoral Law as amended in 2004, Title 2, Section 2.001, Subsection 3. The practice is therefore considered legal and has been published in the official voter's instructions by the State Election Commission for quite some time. This voting option was also allowed and seen in the 1996 and 2000 elections, and had never been contested before, either at the Legislature or by the NPP's Electoral Commissioner. The individual votes for candidates not from the voter's selected party are then deducted from the votes given to the default candidates of the voter's party. The end result is a single vote per candidate.

At the same time, Rosselló challenged the ballots on the United States District Court for the District of Puerto Rico where District Judge Daniel Domínguez ordered the Puerto Rico Election Commission to count the disputed votes but to not adjudicate them to any candidate until he reached a decision on the merits of the case. Acevedo Vilá and his team challenged this ruling and the case moved up to the United States Court of Appeals for the First Circuit, where three judges ruled the question of whether or not the ballots were properly cast was not a federal constitutional issue in the case Rosselló-González v. Calderón-Serra and therefore should be decided by the Supreme Court of Puerto Rico at the Commonwealth level. The Supreme Court affirmed its prior 4–3 decision. On December 28, 2004, the recount ended and Acevedo Vilá was certified as winner and therefore Governor elected. Once the official winners were announced, they were inaugurated to four-year terms on January 2, 2005.

=== Governor ===
Candidate	Party	Votes	%
Aníbal Acevedo Vilá	Popular Democratic Party	963,303	48.62
Pedro Rosselló	New Progressive Party	959,737	48.44
Rubén Berríos	Puerto Rican Independence Party	54,551	2.75
Write-ins		3,779	0.19
Total		1,981,370	100.00
Valid votes		1,981,370	99.55
Invalid votes		4,042	0.20
Blank votes		4,960	0.25
Total votes		1,990,372	100.00
Registered voters/turnout		2,440,131	81.57
Source: Puerto Rico Election Archive

=== Resident Commissioner ===
Candidate	Party	Votes	%
Luis Fortuño	New Progressive Party	956,828	48.83
Roberto Prats	Popular Democratic Party	945,691	48.26
Edwin Irizarry Mora	Puerto Rican Independence Party	56,589	2.89
Write-ins		445	0.02
Total		1,959,553	100.00
Valid votes		1,959,553	99.54
Invalid votes		4,042	0.21
Blank votes		4,960	0.25
Total votes		1,968,555	100.00
Registered voters/turnout		2,440,131	80.67
Source: Puerto Rico Election Archive

=== Senate ===
Party	At-large			District			Total seats
Party	Votes	%	Seats	Votes	%	Seats	Total seats
New Progressive Party	845,228	44.74	6	1,845,204	48.84	11	17
Popular Democratic Party	767,626	40.63	4	1,768,374	46.81	5	9
Puerto Rican Independence Party	178,541	9.45	1	160,632	4.25	0	1
Independent Movement of the Eastern Region				2,936	0.08	0	0
Other parties	297	0.02	0	826	0.02	0	0
Independents	97,673	5.17	0				0
Total	1,889,365	100.00	11	3,777,972	100.00	16	27
Valid votes	1,889,365	99.10					
Invalid votes	5,318	0.28					
Blank votes	11,927	0.63					
Total votes	1,906,610	100.00					
Registered voters/turnout	2,440,131	78.14					
Source: Puerto Rico Election Archive

=== House of Representatives ===
Party	At-large			District			Total seats
Party	Votes	%	Seats	Votes	%	Seats	Total seats
New Progressive Party	886,151	46.71	6	936,030	48.80	26	32
Popular Democratic Party	824,472	43.46	4	901,326	47.00	14	18
Puerto Rican Independence Party	186,197	9.81	1	77,289	4.03	0	1
Citizen Alternative Party				1,682	0.09	0	0
Civil Action Party				423	0.02	0	0
Other parties	457	0.02	0	1,161	0.06	0	0
Total	1,897,277	100.00	11	1,917,911	100.00	40	51
Valid votes	1,897,277	99.10					
Invalid votes	5,318	0.28					
Blank votes	11,927	0.62					
Total votes	1,914,522	100.00					
Registered voters/turnout	2,440,131	78.46					
Source: Puerto Rico Election Archive
