= 20th Senate of Puerto Rico =

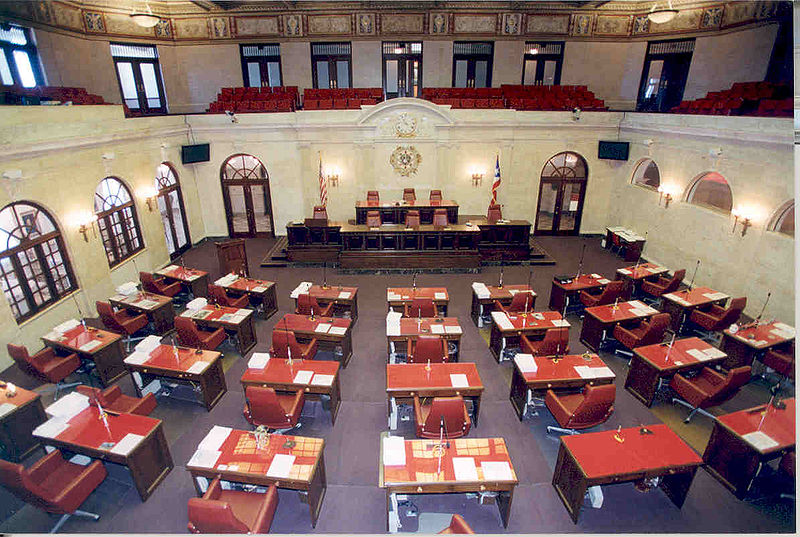

In session
- January 2, 1993 – January 1, 1997

Leadership
- President: Roberto Rexach Benítez
- President pro tem: Nicolás Nogueras (1993-1995); Luisa Lebrón (1995-1996)
- Minority Leaders: Miguel A. Hernandez Agosto (PPD); Rubén Berríos Martinez (PIP)

Structure
- Seats: 29 voting members
- Parties represented: PNP; PPD; PIP

Legislature
- 12th Legislative Assembly of Puerto Rico

Lower house
- 24th House of Representatives of Puerto Rico

Sessions
- 1st: January 14, 1993 – January 12, 1994
- 2nd: January 13, 1994 – January 11, 1995
- 3rd: January 12, 1995 – January 10, 1996
- 4th: January 11, 1996 – January 1, 1997

The 20th Senate of Puerto Rico was the upper house of the 12th Legislative Assembly of Puerto Rico that met from January 2, 1993, to January 1, 1997. All members were elected in the General Elections of 1992. The Senate had a majority of members from the New Progressive Party (PNP).

The body is counterparted by the 24th House of Representatives of Puerto Rico in the lower house.

== Leadership ==
Position	Name	Party	District
President of the Senate	Roberto Rexach Benítez	PNP	At-Large
President pro Tempore	Nicolás Nogueras Cartagena	PNP	At-Large
Majority Leader		PNP	
Majority Whip		PNP	
Minority Leader		PPD	
Minority Whip		PPD	

== Members ==
=== Membership ===
District	Name	Party
I - San Juan	Oreste Ramos	PNP
I - San Juan	Rolando Silva	PNP
II - Bayamón	Aníbal Marrero Pérez	PNP
II - Bayamón	Héctor O'Neill	PNP
III - Arecibo	Norma Carranza	PNP
III - Arecibo	Víctor Marrero Padilla	PNP
IV - Mayagüez-Aguadilla	Antonio Fas Alzamora	PPD
IV - Mayagüez-Aguadilla	Rafael Rodríguez González	PNP
V - Ponce	Eddie Zavala	PNP
V - Ponce	Dennis Vélez Barlucea	PNP
VI - Guayama	José Enrique Meléndez	PNP
VI - Guayama	Cirilo Tirado Delgado	PPD
VII - Humacao	Miguel A. Loíz	PNP
VII - Humacao	Luis Felipe Navas	PNP
VIII - Carolina	Roger Iglesias	PNP
VIII - Carolina	Luisa Lebrón	PNP
At-Large	Eudaldo Báez Galib	PPD
At-Large	Rubén Berríos	PIP
At-Large	Velda González de Modestti	PPD
At-Large	Miguel Hernández Agosto	PPD
At-Large	Kenneth McClintock	PNP
At-Large	Nicolás Nogueras Cartagena	PNP
At-Large	Mercedes Otero	PPD
At-Large	Sergio Peña Clos	PPD
At-Large	Roberto Rexach Benítez	PNP
At-Large	Marco Rigau	PPD
At-Large	Enrique Rodríguez Negrón	PNP
At-Large	Charlie Rodríguez	PNP
At-Large	Freddy Valentín	PNP
