= List of gubernatorial nominees from the Popular Democratic Party of Puerto Rico =

This is list of the nominees that the Popular Democratic Party has ticketed for the post of governor of Puerto Rico throughout history.

style="margin: 0 auto"

#	Portrait	Name	Election	Result	Remarks
1		Luis Muñoz Marín	1948	won	first democratically elected governor; first governor under the Constitution of Puerto Rico
2		Luis Muñoz Marín	1952	won	
3		Luis Muñoz Marín	1956	won	
4		Luis Muñoz Marín	1960	won	
5	Roberto Sánchez Vilella	Roberto Sánchez Vilella	1964	won	1st Secretary of State of Puerto Rico
6		Luis Negrón López	1968	lost	9th President pro tempore of the Senate of Puerto Rico
7	Rafael Hernández Colón	Rafael Hernández Colón	1972	won	6th President of the Senate of Puerto Rico
8	Rafael Hernández Colón	Rafael Hernández Colón	1976	lost	
9	Rafael Hernández Colón	Rafael Hernández Colón	1980	lost	
10	Rafael Hernández Colón	Rafael Hernández Colón	1984	won	
11	Rafael Hernández Colón	Rafael Hernández Colón	1988	won	
12		Victoria Muñoz Mendoza	1992	lost	daughter of Luis Muñoz Marín; first woman to seek the post of governor of Puerto Rico; member of the 18th Senate of Puerto Rico; member of the 19th Senate of Puerto Rico
13	Héctor Luis Acevedo	Héctor Luis Acevedo	1996	lost	10th Secretary of State of Puerto Rico; former mayor of San Juan
14	Sila María Calderón	Sila María Calderón	2000	won	first and only woman ever to be elected as Governor of Puerto Rico; former mayor of San Juan; 12th Secretary of State of Puerto Rico
15	Aníbal Acevedo Vilá	Aníbal Acevedo Vilá	2004	won	member of the 24th House of Representatives of Puerto Rico; Minority Leader of the 25th House of Representatives of Puerto Rico; 17th Resident Commissioner of Puerto Rico
16	Aníbal Acevedo Vilá	Aníbal Acevedo Vilá	2008	lost	
17	Alejandro Garcia Padilla	Alejandro Garcia Padilla	2012	won	
18	David Bernier	David Bernier	2016	lost	23rd Secretary of State of Puerto Rico; former President of the Puerto Rico Olympic Committee
19		Carlos Delgado Altieri	2020	lost	former mayor of Isabela, Puerto Rico
20		Jesús Manuel Ortiz	2024	lost	Member of the House of Representatives
