= List of directors of the Puerto Rico Federal Affairs Administration =

The following is a list of directors of the Puerto Rico Federal Affairs Administration.

#	Name	Term start	Term end	Political party	Governor	Affiliation
1	Joaquín Márquez					
2	José A. Cabranes	1973	1975	PPD	Rafael Hernández Colón	Democrat
3	José Ortiz Dalliot					
4	Wanda Rubianes					
5	Xavier Romeu					
6	Mari Carmen Aponte	2001	2004	PPD	Sila M. Calderón	Democrat
7	Eduardo Bhatia	2005	2008	PPD	Aníbal Acevedo Vilá	Democrat
8	Flavio Cumpiano	2008	2009	PPD	Aníbal Acevedo Vilá	Democrat
9	Richard Figueroa	2009	2009	PNP	Luis Fortuño	
10	Nicole Guillemard	2009	2013	PNP	Luis Fortuño	
11	Juan Eugenio Hernández Mayoral	2013	2017	PPD	Alejandro García Padilla	Democrat
12	Carlos R. Mercader Pérez	2017	2019	PNP	Ricardo Rosselló	Democrat
13	Jennifer M. Storipan, Esq	2019	2020	PNP	Wanda Vázquez Garced	Republican
14	Carmen M. Feliciano	2021	2023	PNP	Pedro Pierluisi	Democrat
15	Luis Dávila Pernas	2023	2025	PNP	Pedro Pierluisi	Democrat
16	Gabriella Boffelli	2025	Present	PNP	Jenniffer González	Republican
