= José Manuel Ramos Barroso =

Puerto Rican politician (1928–1996)

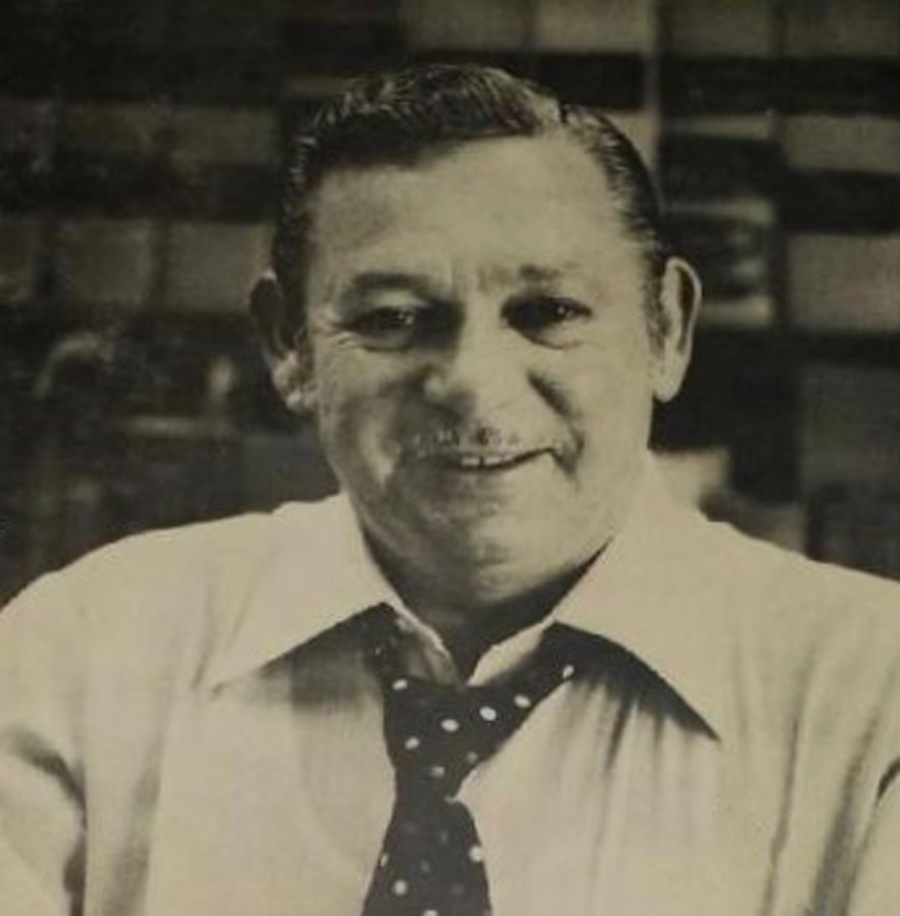

Member of the Puerto Rico Senate from the Bayamón district
- In office 1977–1985

President pro tempore of the Senate of Puerto Rico
- In office 1977–1980
- Preceded by: Miguel Hernández Agosto
- Succeeded by: Sergio Peña Clos

Personal details
- Born: 14 February 1928 Bayamón, Puerto Rico
- Died: 20 August 1996 (aged 68)
- Party: New Progressive Party (PNP)
- Spouse: Carmen M. Fonseca
- Children: Carmen M. José A. Luis A. Carlos R.
- Education: Mount St. Mary's University (BA); Georgetown Law School (JD)
- Profession: Politician, Senator

Military service
- Allegiance: United States of America
- Branch/service: United States Army
- Rank: Private first class
- Battles/wars: Korean War

José Manuel Ramos Barroso (14 February 1928 – 20 August 1996) was a Puerto Rican politician who served as a Senator. He was a member of the Senate of Puerto Rico from 1977 to 1980.

== Biography ==
José Manuel Ramos Barroso was born in Bayamón, Puerto Rico on 14 February 1928, to Jesús Ramos and Carmen D. Barroso. He studied his elementary and high school at the Colegio Santa Rosa in Bayamón, from 1933 to 1945. Served in the United States Army during the Korean War era. From 1945 to 1948, he completed a Bachelor's degree from Mount St. Mary's University and in 1951, received his Juris Doctor from Georgetown Law School in Washington, D.C.

Ramos worked as a private lawyer for 25 years. In the 1970s, he entered politics and was elected to the Senate of Puerto Rico for the District of Bayamón at the 1976 elections. During that term, he served as President pro tempore under Luis A. Ferré. He was reelected at the 1980 elections.

Ramos married Carmen M. Fonseca on August 16, 1956. They had four children together: Carmen M., José A., Luis A., and Carlos R. He died on 20 August 1996, at the age of 68 after suffering from cancer. He was buried at the Puerto Rico National Cemetery in Bayamón, Puerto Rico.

Senate of Puerto Rico
Preceded by Miguel Hernández Agosto	President pro tempore of the Senate of Puerto Rico; 1977–1980	Succeeded by Sergio Peña Clos
