= 21st Senate of Puerto Rico =

Session of the Puerto Rico Legislature

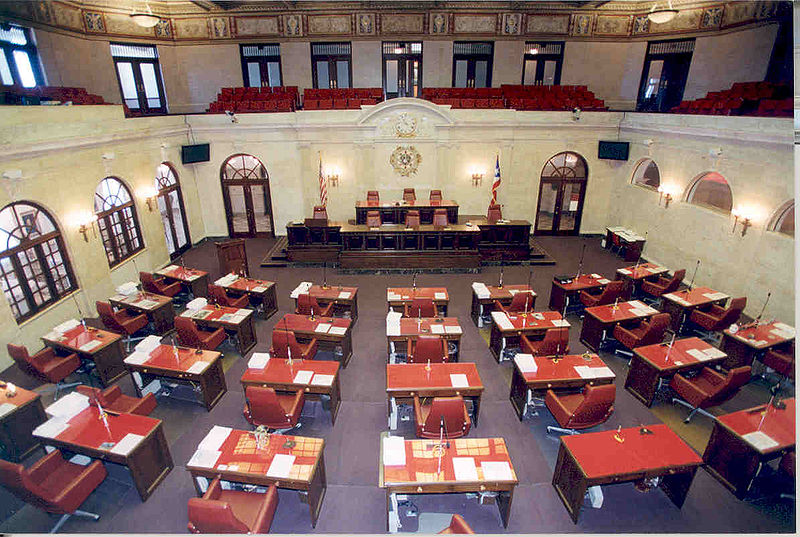

In session
- January 2, 1997 – January 1, 2001

Leadership
- President: Charlie Rodríguez
- President pro tem: Aníbal Marrero Pérez (1997-2000); Lucy Arce (2000)
- Majority Leader: José Enrique Meléndez (PNP)
- Minority Leader: Antonio Fas Alzamora (PPD); Rubén Berríos (PIP)

Structure
- Seats: 28 voting members
- Parties represented: PNP; PPD; PIP

Legislature
- 13th Legislative Assembly of Puerto Rico

Lower house
- 25th House of Representatives of Puerto Rico

Sessions
- 1st: January 14, 1997 – January 12, 1998
- 2nd: January 13, 1998 – January 11, 1999
- 3rd: January 12, 1999 – January 10, 2000
- 4th: January 11, 2000 – January 1, 2001

The 21st Senate of Puerto Rico was the upper house of the 13th Legislative Assembly of Puerto Rico that met from January 2, 1997, to January 1, 2001. All members were elected in the General Elections of 1996. The Senate had a majority of members from the New Progressive Party (PNP).

The body is counterparted by the 25th House of Representatives of Puerto Rico in the lower house.

== Leadership ==
Position	Name	Party	District
President of the Senate	Charlie Rodríguez	PNP	At-Large
President pro Tempore	Aníbal Marrero Pérez	PNP	At-Large
Majority Leader	José Enrique Meléndez	PNP	VI
Majority Whip		PNP	
Minority Leader	Antonio Fas Alzamora	PPD	At-large
Minority Whip		PPD	

== Members ==
=== Membership ===
District	Name	Party
I - San Juan	Junior González	PNP
I - San Juan	Jorge Santini	PNP
II - Bayamón	Aníbal Marrero Pérez	PNP
II - Bayamón	Ramón Luis Rivera Jr.	PNP
III - Arecibo	Norma Carranza	PNP
III - Arecibo	Víctor Marrero Padilla	PNP
IV - Mayagüez-Aguadilla	Carlos Pagán	PNP
IV - Mayagüez-Aguadilla	Jorge Ramos Comas	PPD
V - Ponce	Modesto Agosto Alicea	PPD
V - Ponce	Bruno Ramos	PPD
VI - Guayama	Carmen Luz Berríos	PNP
VI - Guayama	José Enrique Meléndez	PNP
VII - Humacao	Carlos Dávila López	PNP
VII - Humacao	Luis Felipe Navas	PNP
VIII - Carolina	Roger Iglesias	PNP
VIII - Carolina	Luisa Lebrón	PNP
At-Large	Luz Arce Ferrer	PNP
At-Large	Eudaldo Báez Galib	PPD
At-Large	Rubén Berríos	PIP
At-Large	Eduardo Bhatia	PPD
At-Large	Antonio Fas Alzamora	PPD
At-Large	Velda González de Modestti	PPD
At-Large	Kenneth McClintock	PNP
At-Large	Mercedes Otero	PPD
At-Large	Sergio Peña Clos	PNP
At-Large	Roberto Rexach Benítez	PNP
At-Large	Enrique Rodríguez Negrón	PNP
