= Miguel Deynes Soto =

Puerto Rican politician (born 1936)

Member of the Puerto Rico Senate from the Mayagüez-Aguadilla district
- In office 1973–1993

President pro tempore of the Senate of Puerto Rico
- In office 1989–1992
- Preceded by: Sergio Peña Clos
- Succeeded by: Nicolás Nogueras

Personal details
- Born: July 5, 1936 (age 90) Moca, Puerto Rico
- Party: Popular Democratic Party
- Spouse: Cándida Vargas Pérez
- Children: Dalies Jeannette; Miguel A. Itza B.
- Education: University of Puerto Rico at Mayagüez (BAgr); Interamerican University of Puerto Rico (B.Ed, MEc); Interamerican University of Puerto Rico School of Law (JD)
- Profession: Politician

Miguel Deynes Soto (born July 5, 1936, in Moca, Puerto Rico) is a Puerto Rican politician and former Senator. He was a member of the Senate of Puerto Rico from 1973 to 1993.

== Early years and studies ==
Miguel Deynes Soto was born on July 5, 1936, in Moca, Puerto Rico. He studied his elementary and high school in his hometown. Deynes then went to study to the University of Puerto Rico at Mayagüez where he received a Bachelor's degree in Agricultural Sciences in 1955. Deynes continued studying at the Interamerican University of Puerto Rico, and received his Master's degree in Economy and Education in 1970. Finally, he received his Juris doctor from the Interamerican University of Puerto Rico School of Law.

== Political career: 1972-1996 ==
In 1972, he was elected senator for the Mayagüez-Aguadilla District and re-elected until 1992. He chaired the finance committee of that legislative body, as well as the Special Permanent Commission on the Retirement Systems of the Senate. In 1989 he was elected vice president of the Senate. He contributed articles on various topics to the newspaper "El Mundo"

Deynes began his political career in 1972 when he was elected as senator for the District of Mayagüez. He was reelected five consecutive times, the last one being at the 1988 general election. That term he was chosen as President pro tempore by Miguel Hernández Agosto.

During his last term, Deynes was forced to leave his Senate seat after it was discovered he was using his funds inappropriately. He eventually lost his legal license.

== Personal life ==
Deynes Soto is married to Cándida Vargas Pérez. They have four children together: Dalies Jeannette, Miguel A., Itza B. and Miguel Alberto.

== See also ==
- List of Puerto Ricans
- Senate of Puerto Rico

Political offices
Preceded by Sergio Peña Clos	President pro tempore of the Senate of Puerto Rico; 1989–1992	Succeeded by Nicolás Nogueras
