= Senator Gonzalez =

Senator Gonzalez (or González; or Gonzales) may refer to:

== Mexico (Senate of the Republic) ==
- Adriana González Carrillo (born 1975), national-list senator in 2006–2012
- Alejandro González Alcocer (born 1951), senator for Baja California in 2006–2012
- Alejandro González Yáñez (born 1956), national-list senator in 2006–2012, senator for Durango since 2018
- Francisco González de la Vega (1901–1976), senator for Durango in 1952–1956
- José González Gallo (1900–1957), senator for Jalisco in 1934–1940
- José González Morfin (born 1954), national-list senator in 2006–2012
- Manuel González Cosío y Rivera (1915–2002), senator for Querétaro in 1952–1958, 1976 and 1979–1982
- María Merced González González (born 1975), senator for Hidalgo in 2019–2024
- Miguel González Avelar (1937–2011), senator for Durango in 1982 1985
- Nelly González Aguilar (born 1977), senator for Tamaulipas in 2006–2012
- Ruth González Silva (born 1986), senator for San Luis Potosí since 2024
- Saúl González Herrera (1915–2006), senator for Chihuahua in 1988–1994
- Yolanda González Hernández (born 1956), senator for San Luis Potosí in 2000–2006

== Philippines (Senate of the Philippines) ==
- Neptali Gonzales (1923–2001)

== Puerto Rico (Senate of Puerto Rico) ==
- Junior González (fl. 1990s–2000s)
- Luz M. Santiago González (born 1957)
- María Teresa González (fl. 2010s)
- Rafael Rodríguez González (Puerto Rican politician) (fl. 1990s)
- Velda González (1933–2016)

== United States ==
- Efrain Gonzalez Jr. (born 1948), New York State Senate
- Henry B. González (1916–2000), Texas State Senate
- Julie Gonzales (fl. 2010s), Colorado State Senate
- Kristen Gonzalez (born 1995), New York State Senate
- Lena Gonzalez (born 1981), California State Senate
- Roberto Gonzales (born 1951), New Mexico State Senate
- Sally Ann Gonzales (born 1957), Arizona State Senate
