= Senator Padilla =

Senator Padilla may refer to:

- Alex Padilla (born 1973), U.S. Senator from California
- Alejandro García Padilla (born 1971), Senate of Puerto Rico
- Ambrosio Padilla (1910–1996), Senate of the Philippines
- Michael Padilla (born 1972), New Mexico State Senate
- Migdalia Padilla (fl. 2000s–2010s), Senate of Puerto Rico
- Robin Padilla (born 1969), Senate of the Philippines
- Steve Padilla (born 1967), California State Senate
- Víctor Marrero Padilla, Senate of Puerto Rico
