= Miguel A. Loíz =

Puerto Rican politician (born 1934)

Member of the Puerto Rico Senate from the Humacao district
- In office January 2, 1993 – January 1, 1997

Member of the Municipal Assembly of Las Piedras, Puerto Rico
- In office 1988–1992

Personal details
- Born: September 29, 1934 (age 92) San Lorenzo, Puerto Rico
- Party: New Progressive Party (PNP)
- Education: Puerto Rico Junior College (AS); University of Puerto Rico (BSS, M.Ed.)
- Profession: Politician

Military service
- Allegiance: United States of America
- Branch/service: United States Army
- Years of service: 1953-1955
- Rank: Private first class
- Unit: 65th Infantry Regiment
- Battles/wars: Korean War

Miguel Ángel Loiz Zayas is a Puerto Rican politician from the New Progressive Party (PNP). He served as member of the 20th Senate of Puerto Rico from 1993 to 1997.

After serving two years in the United States Army Loiz was honorably discharged from the Army in 1955 as a Private First Class (P.F.C). He returned to Puerto Rico and took the placement exam entering at Ana Roque High School in Humacao, Puerto Rico in the veterans education program. He was vice-commander of post 70 American Legion (Las Piedras), where he chairs the Legislative Advisory Committee of the American Legion of Puerto Rico. He earned Associate degree in education from Puerto Rico Junior College. Then got a Bachelor of Arts in Social Science, and a master's degree in elementary school education English from the University of Puerto Rico. Loíz worked as a teacher in many schools in Las Piedras, Puerto Rico until retirement in 1989 after 30 years of service at Ramón Power y Giralt High School in Las Piedras.

in 1988 Loíz was elected to the Member of the Municipal Assembly of Las Piedras, Puerto Rico and later to Senate of Puerto Rico in the 1992 general election. He represented the District of Humacao, along with Luis Felipe Navas.

== See also ==
- 20th Senate of Puerto Rico
