= Nicolás Nogueras =

Member of the Senate of Puerto Rico

Member of the Puerto Rico Senate from the at-large district
- In office 1973–1985
- In office 1988–1996

President pro tempore of the Senate of Puerto Rico
- In office 1993–1995
- Preceded by: Miguel Deynes Soto
- Succeeded by: Luisa Lebrón de Rivera

Majority Leader of the Puerto Rico Senate
- In office 1977–1981
- Preceded by: Hipólito Marcano
- Succeeded by: Gilberto Rivera Ortiz

Minority Leader of the Puerto Rico Senate
- In office 1981-1982
- Preceded by: Miguel Hernández Agosto
- Succeeded by: Efrain Santiago Melendez

Personal details
- Born: July 5, 1935 Cayey, Puerto Rico
- Died: September 28, 2019 (aged 84) San Juan, Puerto Rico
- Party: New Progressive
- Other political affiliations: Republican
- Spouse: Lizbeth Algarín
- Children: Nicolle Nogueras Mojica
- Education: University of Puerto Rico School of Law (JD)
- Profession: Politician, Attorney

Nicolás Nogueras Cartagena (July 5, 1935 – September 28, 2019) was a Puerto Rican politician, commentator and senator. He was a member of the Senate of Puerto Rico for two separate periods of time. First from 1973 to 1985, and then from 1992 to 1996.

== Biography ==
Nicolás Nogueras was born on July 5, 1935, in Cayey, Puerto Rico. He received his law degree from the University of Puerto Rico School of Law in 1959.

Nogueras began his political career with the Republican Party, but then joined the New Progressive Party (PNP). In 1972, he was elected to the Senate of Puerto Rico for the first time. He was re-elected in 1976 and 1980. He served as Majority Speaker of the House of Representatives from 1977 to 1980.

In 1978, Nogueras tried to obtain a writ of certiorari against Puerto Rican airline Prinair at the United States Supreme Court, but he was denied.

Nogueras retired from politics in 1985, but returned in 1988 when he was again reelected as Senator at the general elections. He was reelected in 1992 and was chosen as President pro tempore of the Senate.

In 1996, Nogueras was expelled from the Senate when House Speaker Zaida Hernández accused him of tax evasion. After several years, the accusations against Nogueras weren't proved and he was acquitted.

Aside from politics, Nogueras worked as a hotel and real estate owner. He also worked in the music and entertainment business as director of the César Concepción Orchestra, as a political commentator on various television and radio programs and as a private attorney. In 2011, he briefly represented PNP legislator Iván Rodríguez Traverzo in a case against him.

Nogueras was married to Lizbeth Algarín.

== See also ==
- List of Puerto Ricans
- Senate of Puerto Rico

Senate of Puerto Rico
Preceded by Hipólito Marcano	Majority Leader of the Puerto Rico Senate; 1977–1981	Succeeded by Gilberto Rivera Ortiz
Preceded by Miguel Deynes Soto	President pro tempore of the Puerto Rico Senate; 1993–1995	Succeeded by Luisa Lebrón de Rivera
