= Senator Vázquez =

Senator Vázquez may refer to:

- Eddie Zavála Vázquez, Senate of Puerto Rico
- Evelyn Vázquez, Senate of Puerto Rico
