= Senator Otero =

Senator Otero may refer to:

- Ángel M. Rodríguez Otero (born 1967), Senate of Puerto Rico
- Mercedes Otero (1938–2012), Senate of Puerto Rico
