= Dennis Vélez Barlucea =

Puerto Rican politician

Member of the Puerto Rico Senate from the Ponce district
- In office January 2, 1993 – January 1, 1997

Personal details
- Born: Adjuntas, Puerto Rico
- Party: New Progressive Party (PNP)
- Profession: Politician, Lawyer

Dennis Vélez Barlucea is a Puerto Rican politician from the New Progressive Party (PNP). He served as member of the 20th Senate of Puerto Rico from 1993 to 1997.

Vélez was elected to the Senate of Puerto Rico in the 1992 general election. He represented the District of Ponce, along with Eddie Zavála Vázquez.

Vélez ran again for the 1996 general election, but lost to the candidates of the Popular Democratic Party (PPD).

== See also ==
- 21st Senate of Puerto Rico
