= Hipólito Marcano =

Puerto Rican lawyer, professor, labor leader and politician

Member of the Puerto Rico Senate from the at-large district
- In office 1957–1980

Mayority Leader of the Puerto Rico Senate
- In office 1969–1976
- Preceded by: Luis Negrón López
- Succeeded by: Nicolás Nogueras

Secretary of the Puerto Rico Senate
- In office 1981–1984
- Preceded by: Héctor Hernández Suárez
- Succeeded by: Ramón García Santiago

Personal details
- Born: August 13, 1913 Humacao, Puerto Rico
- Died: November 16, 1989 (aged 76)
- Party: Popular Democratic Party
- Other political affiliations: Democratic
- Education: Interamerican University of Puerto Rico (BA); Interamerican University of Puerto Rico School of Law (LL.B)
- Occupation: Lawyer, Politician, Senator

Hipólito Marcano Ortiz was a Puerto Rican lawyer, professor, labor leader and politician who was a senator at-large in the Puerto Rico Senate.

== Early life and education ==
Hipólito Marcano was born on August 13, 1913, in Humacao, Puerto Rico. He graduated with a Bachelor of Arts degree from the Interamerican University of Puerto Rico in May 1937. He graduated with a bachelor's degree in law from the Interamerican University of Puerto Rico School of Law in June 1940.

== Public life ==
In 1963 he traveled to Africa as president of the International Arbitration Commission appointed by the International Confederation of Free Organizations (ICFTU) and the Inter-American Organization of Workers (ILO) to resolve disputes and conflicts between the Workers' Federations of Northern and Southern Rhodesia. He represented the World Council of Churches held in Amsterdam in 1949 and in Evanston, Illinois in 1954.

He accepted to the Freemasonry of Puerto Rico. Was grand master of the Sovereign Grand Lodge and was elected to that position annually from 1953 to 1969.

He was Senator At-large been elected in 1957 until 1980 under the insignia of the Popular Democratic Party. Served as Majority Leader of the Puerto Rico Senate from 1969 to 1876.

Was Secretary of the Puerto Rico Senate from 1981 to 1984.

== Death and legacy ==
Hipólito Marcano died on November 16, 1989, at the age of 76. He was buried at Cementerio Historico Barrio La Pratt in Humacao, Puerto Rico.

The main building of the Interamerican University of Puerto Rico School of Law was named after Hipólito Marcano. Part of state road PR 3 in Humacao was named after Hipólito Marcano.

Senate of Puerto Rico
Preceded by Luis Negrón López	Majority Leader of the Puerto Rico Senate; 1969–1976	Succeeded by Nicolás Nogueras
