= Senator Lopez =

Senator Lopez (or López) may refer to:

- Antoinette Sedillo Lopez (born 1956/57), New Mexico State Senate
- Carlos Dávila López (born 1950), Senate of Puerto Rico
- Ernesto Lopez (born 1976), Delaware State Senate
- Fernando Lopez (1904–1993), Senate of the Philippines
- Joe Eddie Lopez (born 1939), Arizona State Senate
- Juan Hernández López (1859–1944), Senate of Puerto Rico
- Linda J. Lopez (born 1948), Arizona State Senate
- Linda M. Lopez (born 1964), New Mexico State Senate
- Luis Negrón López (1909–1991), Senate of Puerto Rico

== See also ==
- Rick Lopes (born 1971), Connecticut State Senate
