= Rolando Silva =

Puerto Rican politician (1945–2022)

Member of the Puerto Rico Senate from the San Juan district
- In office January 2, 1981 – January 1, 1997

Personal details
- Born: February 19, 1945 New York, NY
- Died: June 7, 2022 (aged 77)
- Party: New Progressive Party (PNP)
- Education: University of Puerto Rico (BBA); University of Puerto Rico School of Law (JD)
- Profession: Politician, Lawyer

Military service
- Allegiance: United States of America
- Branch/service: United States Army
- Rank: Captain
- Battles/wars: Vietnam War

Rolando Alvaro "Rolo" Silva Iglecia (February 19, 1945 - June 7, 2022), was a Puerto Rican politician from the New Progressive Party (PNP). He served as member of the Senate of Puerto Rico from 1981 to 1997.

Silva served in the United States Army as a captain during the Vietnam War. Earned a Juris doctor from the University of Puerto Rico School of Law. He was elected to the Senate of Puerto Rico in the 1980 general election. He represented the District of San Juan. Silva was reelected three more times (1984, 1988, and 1992).

After that, Silva has worked as a Legislative Advisor for the President of the Senate Thomas Rivera Schatz.

Rolando Silva died on a Tuesday June 7, 2022. He was suffering from Alzheimer's disease at an assisted living home at age 77. He was buried at the Puerto Rico National Cemetery in Bayamón, Puerto Rico.

== See also ==
- 21st Senate of Puerto Rico
