= Carlos Dávila López =

Puerto Rican politician

Member of the Puerto Rico Senate from the Humacao district
- In office January 2, 1997 – January 1, 2001

Majority Whip of the Senate of Puerto Rico
- In office April 10, 2000 – December 31, 2000
- Preceded by: Luz Arce Ferrer
- Succeeded by: Bruno Ramos

Personal details
- Born: September 15, 1950 (age 75) Yabucoa, Puerto Rico
- Party: New Progressive Party (PNP)
- Education: University of Turabo (BBA)
- Profession: Politician

Military service
- Allegiance: United States of America
- Branch/service: United States Army
- Years of service: 1968-1971
- Rank: Sergeant
- Unit: 1st Cavalry Division
- Battles/wars: Vietnam War

Carlos Dávila López is a Puerto Rican politician from the New Progressive Party (PNP). Dávila served as member of the 21st Senate of Puerto Rico from 1997 to 2001.

== Education and work expecience ==
Graduated from Teodoro Aguilar High School in Yabucoa. Completed a Bachelor's degree in Business Administration from the University of Turabo. Served with the United States Army from 1968 including service in the Vietnam War with the 1st Cavalry Division until been honorably discharged in 1971. He worked for 18 years for Johnson & Johnson Consumer Products. Subsequently, he was Chief Executive Officer of Consorcio del Sureste from 1993 to 1996.

== Politics ==
Dávila was elected to the Senate of Puerto Rico in the 1996 general election to the District of Humacao, along with Luis Felipe Navas. In the four-year period from 1997 to 2000, he presided over the Commission of Municipal Affairs and was appointed Alternate Spokesperson of the Majority on April 10, 2000. Dávila ran for reelection at the 2000 general elections, but was defeated by the candidates of the PPD.

After that, Dávila has worked as a Legislative Aide for the President of the Senate Thomas Rivera Schatz.

== See also ==
- 21st Senate of Puerto Rico
