= Sergio Peña Clos =

Puerto Rican politician (1927–2018)

Sergio Nicolás Peña Clos

Member of the Puerto Rico Senate from the at-large district
- In office 1980–2004

President pro tempore of the Senate of Puerto Rico
- In office 1981–1988
- Preceded by: José Manuel Ramos Barroso
- Succeeded by: Miguel Deynes Soto

Personal details
- Born: June 13, 1927 Humacao, Puerto Rico
- Died: March 20, 2018 (aged 90)
- Party: Popular Democratic Party (PPD); New Progressive Party (PNP)
- Education: University of Puerto Rico (BSS); University of Puerto Rico School of Law (JD)
- Profession: Politician, Senator, Attorney

Sergio Nicolás Peña Clos (June 13, 1927 – March 20, 2018) was a Puerto Rican politician and Senator. He was a member of the Senate of Puerto Rico from 1980 to 2004.

== Early years and studies ==
Sergio Peña Clos was born on June 13, 1927, on Humacao, Puerto Rico, to Dr. Sergio Peña Almodóvar and Maria Clos Ribót. He finished the eighth grade at the Ponce de León public school in his hometown, and graduated from high school at the Colegio San José in Río Piedras at the age of fourteen. With only 15 years, Peña Clos enrolled at the University of St. Louis in Missouri, where he studied for three years. He then returned to Puerto Rico and in 1951, he finished his bachelor's degree in social science at the University of Puerto Rico. In 1955, he graduated as an attorney from the University of Puerto Rico School of Law.

== Professional career ==
At age 21, Peña Clos was a judicial adviser to judge Julio Suárez Garriga. At the age of 23, he opened his own law firm in Caguas and worked as a criminal lawyer.

In 1960, while working at the Puerto Rico Bar Association, Peña Clos became interested in the case of Salvador Agron ("The Capeman") and Tony Hernández ("Umbrella Man"), two Puerto Rican gang members (aged 16 and 15 respectively) accused of murdering two innocent teenagers and sentenced to death row. Peña Clos appeared at the New York Court of Appeals as a friend of the court, analyzing the case. Peña Clos also met with Governor Nelson Rockefeller, and eventually Agrón's death sentence was eliminated, while Hernández' sentence was revoked.

In 1975, Peña Clos was named member and Vice President of the Civil Rights Commission of the Government of Puerto Rico. He remained in the commission until 1977.

== Political career ==
=== First terms as Senator with the PPD: 1980-1996 ===
Peña Clos began his political career in 1980 when he was elected to the Senate of Puerto Rico for the Popular Democratic Party (PPD). During that term, he was elected President pro tempore of the Senate, under Miguel Hernández Agosto. Peña Clos was reelected in 1984 and continued to serve as president pro tempore until 1988. Peña Clos was again reelected in the elections of 1988 and 1992.

=== Senator with the PNP: 1996-2000 ===
Peña Clos left the Popular Democratic Party (PPD) and joined the New Progressive Party (PNP) appearing on their ballot as Senator for the 1996 elections. He was reelected once again and presided over the Commission of Government Ethics and the Special Commission on the Events of the Cerro Maravilla incident.

=== Independent senator and return to the PPD: 2000-2004 ===
Peña Clos was again reelected in 2000 with the New Progressive Party. However, he left the party in the middle of his term and declared himself an independent senator. He finished the term returning to the Popular Democratic Party. He presented his candidacy under the PPD for the 2003 primaries, but lost.

== Later years: 2004-2018 ==
Peña Clos continued working as an attorney and collaborated as a political commentator on television and radio shows. He died on March 20, 2018, at the age of 90. He was buried at Cementerio Borinquen Memorial in Caguas, Puerto Rico.

== Personal life ==
Peña Clos was married to Zoraida Ortiz Rivera, who was almost 40 years younger. In 2005, the senator was accused of domestic violence against Ortiz, but a jury absolved him of the charge.

== See also ==
- List of Puerto Ricans
- Senate of Puerto Rico

Senate of Puerto Rico
Preceded by José Manuel Ramos Barroso	President pro tempore of the Senate of Puerto Rico; 1981–1988	Succeeded by Miguel Deynes Soto
