= Colegio San José (San Juan) =

Private Catholic school in San Juan, Puerto Rico

Location
- San Juan, Puerto Rico, 00925; United States; 18.3958°N 66.0461°W

Information
- Type: Private middle school and high school
- Motto: Latin: Ad conservandam fidem English: To preserve the faith let me bequeath
- Religious affiliations: Roman Catholic; Society of Mary
- Established: 1938; 88 years ago
- Chaplain: Francisco T. González
- President: Carmen Camacho
- Gender: Boys
- Age: Middle School Grades 6-8; High School Grades 9-12 to (US System)
- Enrolment: <1,000
- Color
- Publication: La Lanza
- Website: csjpr.org

Colegio San José is a Catholic, Marianist, college preparatory school in San Juan, Puerto Rico.

Around 50–70% of graduates study in a university outside of the island, mainly in the continental United States. San José has 25 organized clubs, a varsity program in eleven sports (volleyball, basketball, baseball, tennis, golf, soccer, indoor soccer, cross-country, track and field, swimming, bowling), a junior varsity program with six sports (basketball, tennis, Cross Country, Soccer, Swimming, Track and Field and volleyball) and a juvenile program with three sports (basketball, cross country and volleyball). San José has a student newsletter called La Lanza, an award-winning student publication, and a Student Council. Qualified students are selected as National Honor Society and National Junior Honor Society members. Recent victories achieved by the school during the school year 2008–2009 include winning 7 out of 8 categories during the Intercollegiate League of History and Geography's annual competition.

Colegio San José has had more than 100 National Merit Scholars and several nominations for Presidential Award, during the past five years.

The school was founded by the Society of Mary (Marianists) in 1938.

== Notable alumni ==
=== Politics ===
- Aníbal Acevedo Vilá, Former Governor of Puerto Rico
- Jaime Areizaga-Soto, Former President of the Democratic Latino Organization of Virginia, and a former White House Fellow at the U.S. Treasury Department.
- Eduardo Bhatia, former Senator, Director of the Puerto Rico Federal Affairs Administration, Representative of the Governor in Washington and current senator of the Puerto Rico Commonwealth government.
- Jose Izquierdo Encarnacion, former Puerto Rico Secretary of State and Secretary of Transportation and Public Works
- Ron de Lugo, Former U.S. Virgin Islands Delegate to the Congress
- Sergio Peña Clos, former member of the Senate of Puerto Rico

=== Fine arts ===
- Bruce John Graham, Colombian-American architect. Among his most notable buildings are the Inland Steel Building, the Willis Tower (formerly the Sears Tower), and the John Hancock Center.
- Gabriel Mora Quintero, known artistically as Mora (singer), is a singer, writer, producer, and reggaeton artist who rose to prominence by releasing music on SoundCloud in mid-2017. He has collaborated with prominent members of the Puerto Rican urban scene such as Anuel AA, Myke Towers, Eladio Carrión, while also having writing credits for Jhay Cortez and Bad Bunny. He appeared on the latter's sophomore studio album, YHLQMDLG, and is signed to his label, Rimas Entertainment.
- Black Guayaba, a Grammy-winning Puerto Rican rock band that was formed in 2000. It is composed by Gustavo González (vocalist), Javier Morales (guitar), Carlos "Toro" Ortiz (bass), Carlos Colón (keyboards), and Gabriel Calero (drums).

=== Athletes ===
- Ramón Ramos, Puerto Rican basketball player, who played collegiate basketball at Seton Hall University and professionally for the Portland Trail Blazers
- Federico ("Fico") López Camacho (March 26, 1962 – November 6, 2006) was a Puerto Rican basketball player, member of the Guaynabo Mets.
