= Puerto Rico Federal Affairs Administration =

Executive agency of Puerto Rico

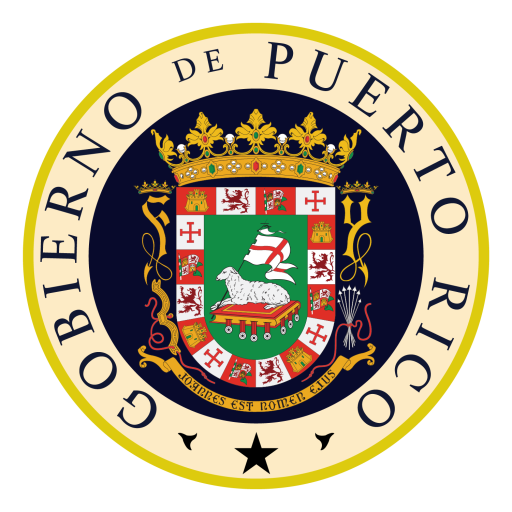

Agency overview
- Formed: June 19, 1979; 47 years ago
- Jurisdiction: Executive branch
- Headquarters: Washington, D.C. 38.904°N 77.0388°W
- Agency executive: Gabriella Boffelli, Executive Director
- Key document: Act No. 77 of 1979
- Website: www.prfaa.pr.gov

The Puerto Rico Federal Affairs Administration (PRFAA)—Spanish: Administración de Asuntos Federales de Puerto Rico—is the executive agency of the government of Puerto Rico that represents the government of the island and its dependencies and municipalities before entities of or in the United States, including:

- The Federal Government of the United States
- Local and State Governments of the United States
- Public or Private Entities in the United States

The administration is similar to a State-Federal relations office and serves as the primary liaison between Puerto Rico's officials, the White House, Congress, and the federal agencies of the United States. Additionally, the office interacts with national organizations representing U.S. governors of other states such as the National Governors Association and the Southern Governors' Association. PRFAA also coordinates the lobbying efforts of the Puerto Rico executive branch in Washington, DC, and assists other Puerto Rican agencies and municipalities in grant-seeking efforts. The agency is also supposed to support the work of the Resident Commissioner of Puerto Rico but the relationship tends to be tumultuous when the governor and the resident commissioner come from different political parties.

PRFAA's headquarters are located in Washington, D.C., at 1100 17th Street NW, while its Regional Office is located at 22 W Monument Ave # 5, Kissimmee, Florida.

== Directors ==
- 1973–1975: José A. Cabranes, PPD
- 1981–1985: Joaquín A. Márquez
- José Ortiz Dalliot
- Wanda Rubianes
- Xavier Romeu
- 2001–2004: Mari Carmen Aponte, PPD
- 2005–2008: Eduardo Bhatia, PPD
- 2008–2009: Flavio Cumpiano, PPD
- 2009: Richard Figueroa, PNP
- 2009–2013: Nicole Guillemard, PNP
- 2013–2017: Juan Eugenio Hernández Mayoral, PPD
- 2017–2019: Carlos R. Mercader Perez, PNP
- 2019–2020: Jennifer M. Storipan, PNP
- 2021–2023: Carmen M. Feliciano, PNP, Democratic Party
- 2023–2025: Luis Dávila Pernas, PNP, Democratic Party
- 2025–Present: Gabriella Boffelli, PNP, Republican Party
