= Rafael Rodríguez González (Puerto Rican politician) =

Puerto Rican politician

Member of the Puerto Rico Senate from the Mayagüez district
- In office January 2, 1993 – January 1, 1997

Personal details
- Born: July 8, 1935 (age 90)
- Party: New Progressive Party (PNP)
- Profession: Politician

Rafael "Rafo" Rodríguez González is a Puerto Rican politician from the New Progressive Party (PNP). He served as member of the 20th Senate of Puerto Rico from 1993 to 1997.

Rodríguez was elected to the Senate of Puerto Rico in the 1992 general election. He represented the District of Mayagüez.

== Education ==
He pursued his studies in public and private institutions in the city of San Germán, later earning baccalaureates in Science and Arts from the Interamerican University of Puerto Rico. He continued his academic training at the University of Illinois Chicago, where he obtained his Doctorate in Optometry with a specialization in contact lenses.

== Professional career ==
He practiced his profession of Optometry simultaneously in San Germán and Mayagüez, standing out not only for his clinical excellence but also for his extensive involvement in the civic and political life of the country. He was part of the founding group of the Junior Chamber of Commerce (Jaycees of Puerto Rico), an active member of the San Germán Lions Club, and under his presidency, the Clubhouse was expanded and remodeled.

== Politics ==
In 1992 he became the first member of the New Progressive Party (PNP) elected to the Senate of Puerto Rico in the Mayagüez district. He was unsuccessful in winning a reelection at the 1996 elections.

== See also ==
- 21st Senate of Puerto Rico
