= Juan Eugenio Hernández Mayoral =

Senator of Puerto Rico

Member of the Puerto Rico Senate from the at-large district
- In office 2 January 2005 – 1 January 2011

Director of the Puerto Rico Federal Affairs Administration
- In office 2013–2017
- Governor: Alejandro García Padilla
- Preceded by: Nicole Guillemard
- Succeeded by: Carlos R. Mercader

Personal details
- Born: 21 April 1969 (age 57) Ponce, Puerto Rico
- Party: Popular Democratic Party
- Other political affiliations: Democratic
- Spouse: Vivian Figueroa (m. 2000)
- Relations: Pablo Hernández Rivera (nephew)
- Education: Universidad del Sagrado Corazón (BA); Universidad Central del Caribe
- Profession: Politician

Juan Eugenio Hernández Mayoral (born 21 April 1969 in Ponce, Puerto Rico) is a Puerto Rican politician who served as director of the Puerto Rico Federal Affairs Administration (PRFAA) from 2013 to 2016 and is a former Senator of Puerto Rico (2005–2012). He is the son of former three-term Governor of Puerto Rico Rafael Hernández Colón.

== Early years and studies ==
Juan Eugenio Hernández Mayoral was born on 21 April 1969 in the City of Ponce to Governor Rafael Hernández Colón and First Lady Lila Mayoral Wirshing. He has three siblings: Rafael, José Alfredo, and Dora Mercedes.

Hernández Mayoral obtained his bachelor's degree in communications from the Universidad del Sagrado Corazón in 1992. Hernández Mayoral received a Juris Doctor from (Pontifia Universidad Catolica de Puerto Rico) in 2021.

== Professional career ==
Hernández Mayoral worked as executive director of the Rafael Hernández Colón Gubernatorial Library from 1993 to 2000. In 1996, he also worked as executive director of the annual conference of the Club of Rome.

Juan Eugenio also administered the Hernández Mayoral Law Firm in 2001. He was also a consultant in political communications from 2002 to 2004.

== Political career ==
In the 2004 general elections, Juan Eugenio was elected as Senator. During his first term, he served in the Public Safety, Federal and Consumer Affairs, Judicial, Municipal and Finance Affairs, Employment Affairs, Education, Culture, and Sports Committees of the Senate of Puerto Rico.

Hernández Mayoral was reelected on the 2008 elections. He has been the Ranking Member for the Urban and Infrastructure Committee, as well as the Veterans Affairs, Municipal Affairs, and Puerto de Las Américas committees.

An active member of the Puerto Rico Democratic Party, of which he serves as Secretary of its State Committee, he will be attending his seventh consecutive Democratic National Convention in Charlotte, North Carolina in September.

== Personal life ==
Hernández Mayoral has been married to Vivian Figueroa since 24 June 2000. He is a Roman Catholic.
