= Luis Dávila Pernas =

Puerto Rican government official

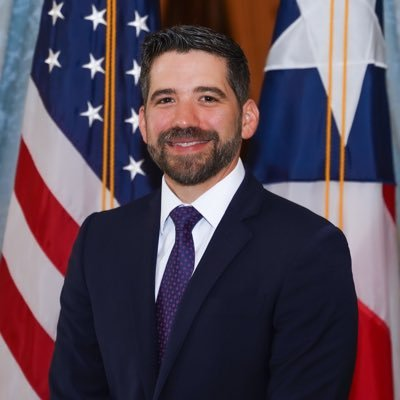

Chair of the Puerto Rico Democratic Party
- Incumbent
- Assumed office March 16, 2024
- Preceded by: Charlie Rodríguez

Director of the Puerto Rico Federal Affairs Administration
- In office March 20, 2023 – January 2, 2025
- Governor: Pedro Pierluisi
- Preceded by: Carmen Feliciano
- Succeeded by: Gabriela Boffelli

Personal details
- Party: New Progressive
- Other political affiliations: Democratic
- Education: Florida International University (BBA); Interamerican University of Puerto Rico (JD)

Luis Daniel Dávila Pernas is a Puerto Rican government official who served as the executive director of the Puerto Rico Federal Affairs Administration from March 20, 2023, to January 2, 2025. In 2024, he was elected chair of the Democratic Party of Puerto Rico.

== Life ==
Luis Dávila Pernas earned a bachelor's degree in Business Administration from the Florida International University and a Juris Doctor degree from the Interamerican University of Puerto Rico School of Law.

He was admitted as an attorney in Puerto Rico, the District of Columbia, and the United States Court of Appeals for the First Circuit. He was Judicial Law Clerk to the Hon. Edgardo Rivera Garcia in the Puerto Rico Supreme Court. He was Legal Intern for Banco Popular de Puerto Rico.

On March 20, 2023, he became the executive director of the Puerto Rico Federal Affairs Administration and served until 2025. He was elected chair of the Democratic Party of Puerto Rico in 2024.

Party political offices
Preceded by Charlie Rodríguez	Chair of the Puerto Rico Democratic Party; 2024–present	Incumbent
