= Nuno López =

Puerto Rican politician (born 1951)

José "Nuno" López

Member of the Puerto Rico House of Representatives from the 1st District
- In office January 2, 2009 – January 2, 2017
- Preceded by: Junior González
- Succeeded by: Eddie Charbonier Chinea
- In office January 2, 2001 – January 1, 2005
- Preceded by: Melinda Romero
- Succeeded by: Junior González

Personal details
- Born: Humacao, Puerto Rico; November 11, 1951 (age 74)
- Party: New Progressive Party (PNP)
- Children: 6
- Education: Interamerican University of Puerto Rico (BA)

José Luis "Nuno" López Muñoz (born November 11, 1951) is a Puerto Rican politician affiliated with the New Progressive Party (PNP). He was a member of the Puerto Rico House of Representatives for two separate instances (2001-2005, 2009–2017), representing District 1.

== Early years and studies ==
José Luis López Muñoz was born in Humacao, Puerto Rico on November 11, 1951. He is the second of three children. He completed his elementary and high school studies in San Lorenzo, Puerto Rico, graduating from the José Campeche High School. He was also president of his Graduate Class.

López completed a Bachelor's degree in Political Sciences from the Interamerican University of Puerto Rico. López was elected to the Puerto Rico House of Representatives for District 1 in 2000 and left the seat in 2003.

== Political career ==
In 1970, López became the president of the PNP Youth in San Lorenzo. Four years later, he was appointed to be Director of the PNP Youth statewide, which in turn, made him a member of the Party Board.

Since 1977, he has worked as Special Aide to then-Speaker of the House Angel Viera Martínez, Legislative Aide to the House of Representatives of Puerto Rico, and Executive Aide to the Speaker of the House.

López was first elected as Representative at the 2000 general election, where he defeated Carmen Yulín Cruz, from the PPD. However, López lost his chance for reelection when he was defeated at the 2003 primaries.

In 2008, López ran again, winning a slot first at the PNP primaries and then prevailing at the 2008 general election.

López was reelected at the 2012 general election.

López was defeated by Eddie Charbonier Chinea in the 2016 PNP Primaries.

== Personal life ==
López is married and has six children.
