= Eddie Zavála Vázquez =

Puerto Rican politician

Member of the Puerto Rico Senate from the Ponce district
- In office January 2, 1993 – January 1, 1997

Personal details
- Born: October 26, 1945 (age 80) Ponce, Puerto Rico
- Party: New Progressive Party (PNP)
- Education: Pontifical Catholic University of Puerto Rico (BBA)
- Profession: Politician

Eduardo "Eddie" Zavála Vázquez is a Puerto Rican politician from the New Progressive Party (PNP). He served as member of the 20th Senate of Puerto Rico from 1993 to 1997.

He studied his primary grades at the Colegio Ponceño. He has a bachelor's degree in arts, Sciences and Business Administration from the Pontifical Catholic University of Puerto Rico in Ponce.

Served as interim mayor of Ponce, since February 10, 1984, due to the resignation of then-mayor José G. Tormos Vega, he held the position until the new mayor José Dapena Thompson was sworn in.

Zavála was elected to the Senate of Puerto Rico in the 1992 general election. He represented the District of Ponce, along with Dennis Vélez Barlucea.

Zavála ran again for the 1996 general election, but lost to the candidates of the Popular Democratic Party (PPD).

He is a member of Phi Sigma Alpha fraternity.

== See also ==
- 21st Senate of Puerto Rico
