= Norma Carranza =

Puerto Rican politician

Member of the Puerto Rico Senate from the Arecibo district
- In office January 2, 1993 – January 1, 2001

Personal details
- Born: April 2, 1938 (age 88) Hatillo, Puerto Rico
- Party: New Progressive Party (PNP)
- Education: University of Puerto Rico (BS); Tulane University School of Medicine (MS); Universidad Autónoma de Santo Domingo (MD)
- Profession: Politician

Norma Carranza De León is a Puerto Rican politician from the New Progressive Party (PNP). She served as member of the Senate of Puerto Rico from 1993 to 2001. He has a Bachelor's degree in Sciences of the nutrition from the University of Puerto Rico, a master's degree in that subject at Tulane University School of Medicine, and a doctorate in medicine from Universidad Autónoma de Santo Domingo in 1975.

Carranza was elected to the Senate of Puerto Rico in the 1992 general election. She represented the District of Arecibo, along with Víctor Marrero Padilla. Carranza was reelected at the 1996 general election.

Carranza ran for a third term at the 2000 general elections, but was defeated by the candidates of the PPD.

Since her departure from Puerto Rican politics, Norma Carranza, returned to the private medical practice.

== See also ==
- 21st Senate of Puerto Rico
