= Mercedes Otero =

Puerto Rican politician

Member of the Senate of Puerto Rico At-large District
- In office January 2, 1993 – January 1, 2001

Secretary of Department of Corrections and Rehabilitation
- In office 1985–1992
- Governor: Rafael Hernández Colón

Personal details
- Born: April 16, 1938 Ciales, Puerto Rico
- Died: June 20, 2012 (aged 74) Hato Rey, Puerto Rico
- Party: Popular Democratic Party (PPD)
- Other political affiliations: Democratic Party
- Spouse: Israel Ramos Perea
- Children: Pedro
- Education: University of Puerto Rico (B.Ed.); University of Missouri (PhD)
- Profession: Politician

Mercedes Otero de Ramos (April 16, 1938 – June 20, 2012) was a Puerto Rican politician and public servant from the Popular Democratic Party (PPD). Otero served as Secretary of the Puerto Rico Department of Corrections and Rehabilitation from 1985 to 1992. After that, she served as a member of the Senate of Puerto Rico from 1993 to 2001.

== Studies and personal life ==
Mercedes Otero received a Bachelor's degree in Secondary Education from the University of Puerto Rico. She also completed a Master's degree in Business Education, with a minor in Secretarial Science and Counseling, and a Doctorate in Sociology and Criminology, both from the University of Missouri.

Otero was married to Israel Ramos Perea. They had a son together: Pedro.

== Professional career ==
Otero worked as a teacher in the public school system, in the Puerto Rican College of Girls, and in the University of Puerto Rico for more than 30 years.

== Public service: 1985–1992 ==
In 1985, Otero was appointed by Governor Rafael Hernández Colón as Secretary of the Puerto Rico Department of Corrections and Rehabilitation. During her time leading the public agency, the inmates referred to her as "Mamá Meche". During her time, she implemented the first program to grant paroles to certain prisoners with constant electronic surveillance. She also wrote papers on women in the penitentiary system.

In 1992, Otero resigned when she considered that some of the signed agreements from a case couldn't be granted.

== Political career: 1992–2001 ==
Otero was elected to the Senate of Puerto Rico in the 1992 general election as a Senator At-large. Otero was reelected at the 1996 general election. Fellow senator Eduardo Bhatia described Otero as her "comrade in arms, mentor, and teacher."

== Return to private life and death: 2001–2012 ==
After retiring from the Senate, Otero returned to her private life. In 2002, she suffered a stroke and a myocardial infarction but recovered.

In March 2012, Otero was honored by the Puerto Rico House of Representatives, along with other female legislators, for her public service. Several months later, she was hospitalized with a swelling in the stomach. It was later revealed that her appendix had broken without her noticing, causing the swelling. Otero died on June 20, 2012, at the Hospital del Maestro in Hato Rey, a sector of San Juan.

Otero's remains were exposed at Ehret Funeral Home in Río Piedras and cremated the next day after a religious service. Governor Luis Fortuño declared three days of mourning.

== See also ==
- 21st Senate of Puerto Rico
