= Aníbal Marrero Pérez =

American politician (1949–2005)

Member of the Puerto Rico Senate from the Bayamón district
- In office 1984–2000
- Preceded by: Guillermo Campos Ayala

President pro tempore of the Senate of Puerto Rico
- In office 1997–2000
- Preceded by: Luisa Lebrón de Rivera
- Succeeded by: Lucy Arce

Personal details
- Born: October 3, 1949 Bayamón, Puerto Rico
- Died: January 25, 2005 (aged 55)
- Party: New Progressive Party
- Spouse: Carmen M. Santos
- Children: Aníbal; Ricardo
- Education: University of Puerto Rico (BBA)
- Profession: Politician, Teacher

Aníbal Marrero Pérez (October 3, 1949 – January 25, 2005) was a Puerto Rican politician. He was a member of the Senate of Puerto Rico from 1984 until he resigned in 2000 amidst corruption charges.

== Biography ==
Aníbal Marrero was born on October 3, 1949, in Bayamón, Puerto Rico, to Víctor Marrero and Jacinta Pérez. He received his bachelor's degree in business administration with a major in management and education from the University of Puerto Rico.

After graduating, Marrero worked as a teacher for the Puerto Rico Department of Education from 1970 to 1972. In that year, he became a school director in Bayamón until 1973. In 1974, he started working as deputy director of the Ecotactics Program for the Municipality of San Juan. In 1977, he was also named as regional director of the Consumer Affairs Department in Bayamón.

Marrero began his political career in 1978, as part of the Municipal Assembly of Bayamón. He presided over the Assembly until 1984 when he resigned to take over the Senate seat left by Guillermo Campos Ayala in the District of Bayamón. In 1988, he was elected as Senator and was then reelected in 1992 and 1996.

That term he was chosen by his fellow senators as President pro tempore, under Charlie Rodríguez. He also presided the Commissions of Banking, Consumer Affairs, and Public Corporations. In 2000, he was forced to resign amidst accusations of corruption. However, after his resignation, no legal action was taken against him. After his resignation, he retired from public life.

Marrero was married to Carmen M. Santos, and had two children: Aníbal and Ricardo. He died on January 25, 2005, of a cardiac arrest.

He was farewell in a memorial ceremony held on Thursday, January 27, 2005, in the Leopoldo Figueroa Carreras Assembly Hall of the Puerto Rico Senate. The Honor Guard for the ceremony included the leaders of the Legislative Bodies, Kenneth D. McClintock Hernández and José F. Aponte Hernández, and the former presidents of the Legislative Bodies.

== See also ==
- Senate of Puerto Rico

Senate of Puerto Rico
Preceded by Oreste Ramos	Minority Whip of the Puerto Rico Senate; 1988–1992	Succeeded by Antonio Fas Alzamora
Preceded by Luisa Lebrón de Rivera	President pro tempore of the Puerto Rico Senate; 1997–2000	Succeeded by Lucy Arce
