= 1970 Puerto Rican suffrage referendum =

Ballot measure in Puerto Rico

- 1 November 1970

Results
Choice	Votes	%
Yes	213,762	59.25%
No	147,037	40.75%
Valid votes	360,799	99.48%
Invalid or blank votes	1,877	0.52%
Total votes	362,676	100.00%
Registered voters/turnout	1,043,733	34.75%

A referendum on electoral suffrage was held in Puerto Rico on 1 November 1970. Voters were asked whether the voting age should be lowered from 21 to 18. The reform was approved by 59.2% of voters, with a turnout of just 34.7%.

== Results ==
Choice	Votes	%
For	213,782	59.25
Against	147,037	40.75
Total	360,819	100.00
Valid votes	360,819	99.48
Invalid/blank votes	1,877	0.52
Total votes	362,696	100.00
Registered voters/turnout	1,043,733	34.75
Source: Nohlen
