= Roberto Rexach Benítez =

Puerto Rican politician

The Honorable Roberto Nicolás Rexach Benítez
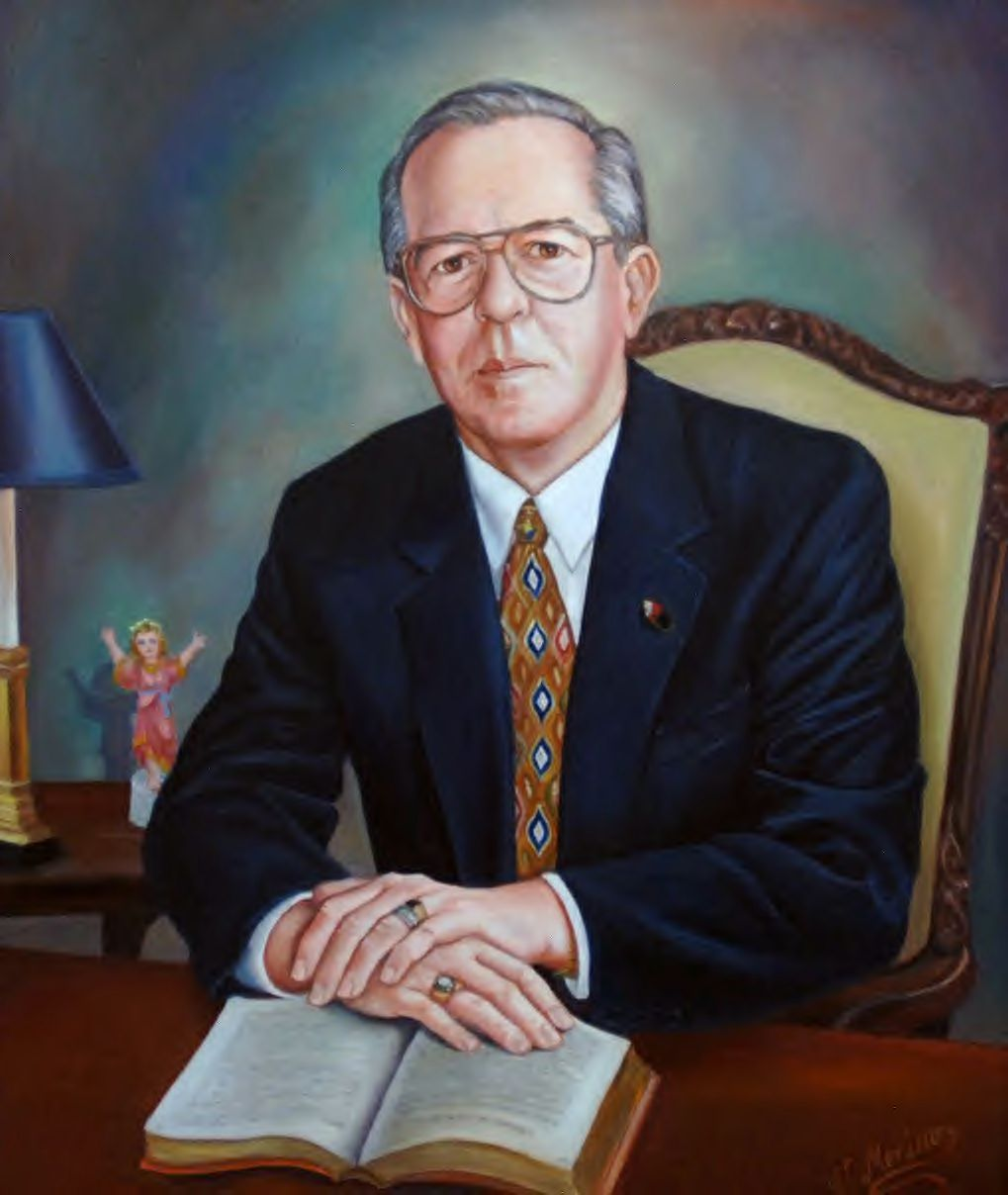

10th President of the Senate of Puerto Rico
- In office 1993–1996
- Preceded by: Miguel Hernández Agosto
- Succeeded by: Charlie Rodríguez

Member of the Senate of Puerto Rico
- In office 1985–1998
- Succeeded by: Pedro Rosselló

Minority Speaker of the Senate of Puerto Rico
- In office 1985–1993
- Preceded by: Nicolás Nogueras
- Succeeded by: Antonio Fas Alzamora

Member of the Puerto Rico House of Representatives
- In office 1973–1976

Personal details
- Born: Roberto Nicolás Rexach Benítez; December 18, 1929 New York City, New York
- Died: April 4, 2012 (aged 82) Arecibo, Puerto Rico
- Party: New Progressive Party
- Spouse: Ada Urdaz
- Education: University of Puerto Rico (BA); University of Maryland (MS); University of Puerto Rico School of Law (JD)
- Profession: Politician

Military service
- Allegiance: United States of America
- Branch/service: Army National Guard
- Years of service: 1948-1953
- Rank: Second lieutenant

Roberto Nicolás Rexach Benítez (December 18, 1929 – April 4, 2012) also known as his stage name Bobby, was a Puerto Rican politician, and former Senator and Representative. Rexach Benítez served as the tenth President of the Senate of Puerto Rico from 1993 to 1996. He also served as a member of the Puerto Rico House of Representatives from 1973 to 1976, under the Popular Democratic Party (PPD) and as a member of the Senate (1985–1998) under the pro-statehood New Progressive Party (PNP).

Prior to his legislative career, he was the first director of the University of Puerto Rico at Arecibo (1967–1970) and University of Puerto Rico at Humacao (1961–1967).

He served in the Puerto Rico National Guard from 1948 to 1953 with the rank of Second Lieutenant.

== Early years and studies ==
Rexach Benítez was born on December 18, 1929, in New York City, to Puerto Rican parents. He was raised in Puerto Rico, studying elementary school in Juncos and Arecibo. He graduated from high school in Río Piedras.

In 1951, Rexach Benítez received his bachelor's degree in social science from the University of Puerto Rico. A year later, he finished his master's degree in political science from the University of Maryland. He also completed two years of studies at the University of Puerto Rico School of Law.

== Professional career ==
Rexach Benítez worked as a professor of Political Science at the University of Puerto Rico in 1958. That same year, he was appointed Aide to the Dean of Administration. From 1961 to 1967, he served as Director and Dean of the Humacao Regional University College. After that, he worked at the same position at the Arecibo Regional University College until 1970.

== Political career ==
In 1973, Rexach Benítez was elected to the House of Representatives under the Popular Democratic Party (PPD). Some years later, he joined the opposing party, the New Progressive Party or New Party for Progress. In 1980, he worked as an aide to the President of the University of Puerto Rico, and from 1981 to 1985, he worked as an adviser to Governor Carlos Romero Barceló.

In 1984, Rexach was elected as Senator At-large at the general elections. After being sworn in, he was chosen as his party's Minority Leader. In 1988, he was reelected and ratified as NPP Minority Leader. He was again reelected at the 1992 elections, and was chosen the 10th President of the Senate of Puerto Rico by his fellow senators. He was sworn in as such on January 11, 1993 and stayed in that position until 1996 when he was reelected as Senator At-large.

== Later years ==
After retiring from politics, Rexach Benítez served as an educational consultant. He also wrote a weekly column for El Vocero newspaper. He also authored several books and essays. Some of them are:

- "Un sistema de elecciones primarias para Puerto Rico" (1954)
- "Pedro Albizu Campos, leyenda y realidad" (1959)
- "Puerto Rico, un pueblo en la encrucijada" (1964)
- "La educación universitaria, lujo o necesidad"

He died April 4, 2012, at his home in Arecibo, Puerto Rico from pulmonary complications traced to 40 years of heavy cigarette smoking. During a memorial service on April 5, 2012, before his remains were cremated, he was eulogized by Secretary of State Kenneth McClintock on behalf of Governor Fortuño, Puerto Rico Senate President Thomas Rivera Schatz and San Juan Mayor Jorge Santini. On April 9, the last of five days of official mourning declared by Governor Fortuño, a mass was held at San Agustín Church in San Juan at which Rexach was once again eulogized by McClintock and Rivera Schatz, in their capacities as immediate past and present Senate presidents at the time.

Political offices
Preceded by Miguel Hernández Agosto	President of the Senate of Puerto Rico; 1993–1996	Succeeded by Charlie Rodríguez
