= Junior González =

Puerto Rican politician (1944–2022)

Member of the Puerto Rico House of Representatives from the 1st District
- In office January 2, 2005 – January 1, 2009
- Preceded by: José López Muñoz
- Succeeded by: José López Muñoz

Member of the Puerto Rico Senate from the San Juan District
- In office January 2, 1997 – January 1, 2001

Personal details
- Born: October 25, 1944 San Juan, Puerto Rico
- Died: June 28, 2022 (aged 77) San Juan, Puerto Rico
- Party: New Progressive Party (PNP)
- Education: Interamerican University of Puerto Rico (BA), (MCJ); Complutense University of Madrid (PhD)
- Profession: Politician

Francisco "Junior" González Rodríguez (October 25, 1944 - June 28, 2022), was a Puerto Rican politician from the New Progressive Party (PNP). He served as member of the 21st Senate of Puerto Rico from 1997 to 2001, and as member of the 27th House of Representatives of Puerto Rico from 2005 to 2009.

González earned her Bachelor of Arts and a Master's degree from the Graduate School of Criminal Justice and Behavioral Sciences at the Interamerican University of Puerto Rico. He completed doctoral studies in Sociology at the Complutense University of Madrid in Spain.. He began his political career as electoral commissioner of the New Progressive Party. He also directed the local office of the former Resident Commissioner Baltasar Corrada del Río. González also worked as aide of Governor Carlos Romero Barceló and of former Secretary of Housing Jorge Pierluisi.

González was elected to the Senate of Puerto Rico in the 1996 general election. He represented the District of San Juan, along with Jorge Santini. González ran for reelection at the 2000 general elections, but was defeated by the candidates of the PPD.

In 2004, González ran again, this time for a seat at the House of Representatives of Puerto Rico. He ended up winning at the 2004 general election, representing District 1.

After finishing his term in 2009, González was hired by the Puerto Rico House of Representatives to work as a Legislative Aide.

Francisco "Junior" González died on June 28, 2022, at age 77. He as buried at Santa María Magdalena de Pazzis Cemetery.

== See also ==
- 21st Senate of Puerto Rico
