= Richard Figueroa =

Venezuelan footballer (born 1996)

Personal information
- Full name: Richard José Figueroa Avilés
- Date of birth: 4 August 1996 (age 30)
- Place of birth: Puerto la Cruz, Venezuela
- Height: 1.73 m (5 ft 8 in)
- Position: Forward

Team information
- Current team: Metropolitanos
- Number: 88

Senior career*
Years	Team	Apps	(Gls)
2014–2016	Petroleros de Anzoátegui	0	(0)
2017	Zulia	6	(0)
2018	Deportivo Anzoátegui	33	(7)
2019	Deportivo Lara	15	(2)
2019–2021	Zamora	58	(12)
2022	Deportivo Táchira	30	(2)
2023	Academia Puerto Cabello	28	(0)
2024	Caracas	6	(0)
2024	Zamora	14	(1)
2025–	Metropolitanos	35	(6)

International career
2021–	Venezuela	0	(0)
- * Club domestic league appearances and goals as of 11 March 2026

Richard José Figueroa Avilés (born 4 August 1996) or simply Richard Figueroa, is a Venezuelan professional footballer who plays for Metropolitanos as a forward.

== International career ==
In June 2021, Figueroa was summoned to the Venezuela national team as one out of 15 'emergency players', after two positive COVID-19 case in the Venezuelan 2021 Copa América squad, while the members of the team had to be isolated.
