= Charlie Rodríguez =

Puerto Rican politician

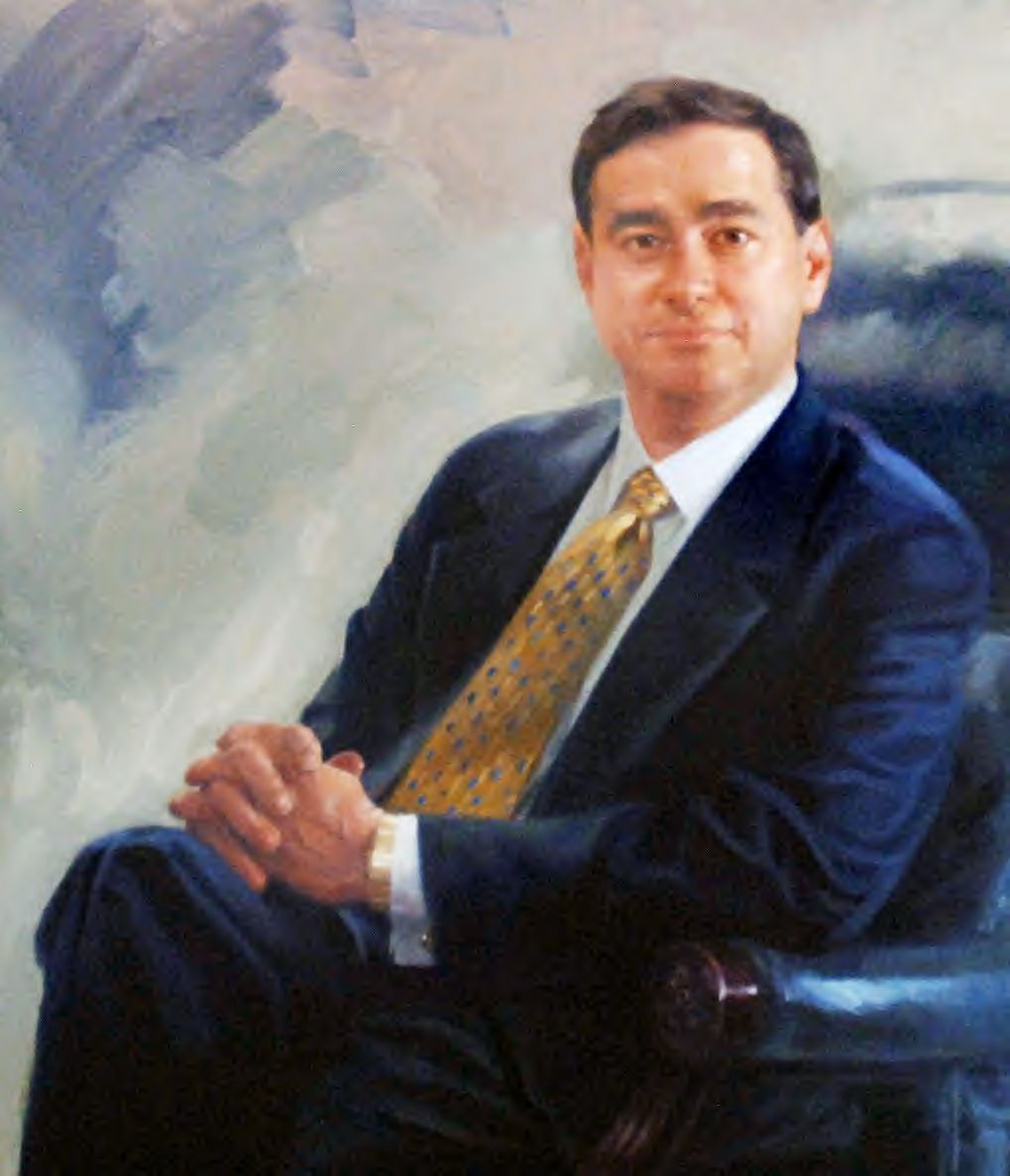

Shadow Member of the U.S. House of Representatives from Puerto Rico
- In office August 15, 2017 – July 1, 2021
- Preceded by: Seat established
- Succeeded by: Ricardo Rosselló

Chair of the Puerto Rico Democratic Party
- In office February 7, 2017 – March 16, 2024
- Preceded by: María Meléndez (acting)
- Succeeded by: Luis Dávila Pernas

President of the Puerto Rico Senate
- In office 1997–2001
- Preceded by: Roberto Rexach Benítez
- Succeeded by: Tony Fas Alzamora

Personal details
- Born: Charles Anthony Rodríguez-Colón; August 26, 1954 (age 71) New York City, New York, U.S.
- Party: New Progressive
- Other political affiliations: Democratic
- Education: Cornell University (BA); University of Puerto Rico, Río Piedras (JD)

Charles Anthony Rodríguez-Colón (born August 26, 1954) is a New York City-born Puerto Rican politician affiliated with the New Progressive Party (NPP). He served as the eleventh president of the Senate of Puerto Rico from 1997 until 2000.

== Early life ==
Charles Anthony Rodríguez-Colón was born in the Bronx, New York City on August 26, 1954. His parents decided to move the family to Puerto Rico in 1961. Charlie Rodríguez attended public schools in his adopted town of Carolina. He was elected President of his class of 1972 and graduated with honors from the Julio Vizcarrondo-Coronado High School of Carolina. He enrolled in the University of Puerto Rico, but later transferred to Cornell University in New York, where he obtained the degree of Bachelor of Arts, majoring in Government and History, in 1976. He also attended his first year of law school at Cornell University, from which he transferred to the University of Puerto Rico Law School achieving the degree of Juris Doctor in 1983. In that same year, he was admitted to the local state bar and eventually was admitted to practice law in the federal district and appellate courts for Puerto Rico.

== Political career ==
=== 1970s ===
At the age of 13 years, Charlie Rodríguez became active in the youth chapter of the New Progressive Party (NPP), the pro-statehood party in Puerto Rico. He held different leadership positions in the statehood youth movement, at the ward, precinct and municipal levels in his hometown of Carolina.

In 1979 he was elected President of the New Progressive Party Youth State Organization. From such position Charlie Rodríguez organized the campaign among young voters to re-elect Governor Carlos Romero Barceló. Rodríguez participated in debates and forums in universities campuses, radio and television, promoting the vision of statehood, the NPP platform and the reasons to reelect Governor Romero Barceló. The 1980 elections were decided by a small margin, the closest ever held in Puerto Rico, making the youth vote even more important.

=== 1980s ===
In 1980 Charlie Rodríguez was elected State Representative At-large. His dedication to his legislative duties led to his reelection in 1984, even though his party lost the governorship. While a member of the State House of Representatives, he assumed in 1985 the leadership of the New Progressive Party in the city of Carolina and in 1988 unsuccessfully sought the office of Mayor. However, Rodríguez obtained the highest number of votes ever achieved by a New Progressive Party candidate for Mayor in Carolina.

=== 1990s ===
After four years in private legal practice, Charlie Rodríguez returned to the legislature in the elections of 1992 as a State Senator (at-large) and was unanimously elected by his colleagues as Senate Majority Leader, in charge of steering the New Progressive Party platform and Governor Pedro Rosselló's legislative agenda. Rodríguez was re-elected State Senator in 1996. When the Senate convened early in 1997, Rodríguez was elected by his colleagues President of the Senate of Puerto Rico.

As Senate President, Rodríguez continued pursuing the party's legislative agenda during Rosselló's second and last term as governor. He also advanced legislative initiatives on the environment, economic development, crime and social welfare.

Rodríguez sought the New Progressive Party nomination for Mayor of the Capital City of San Juan in the 1999 primary but lost to San Juan Senator Jorge Santini. Rodríguez was not able to return to the Senate in 2000 because primaries as well as the election for all elective offices in Puerto Rico take place on the same date every four years.

=== 2000s ===
After polling less than 7% of the vote in the 2003 NPP primary for Resident Commissioner – the non-voting delegate to the U.S. House of Representatives from Puerto Rico, – Charlie Rodríguez was appointed chairman of the NPP 2004 Platform Committee by Pedro Rosselló, who was running for a third term as governor.

On August 20, 2006, during the annual Convention of the New Progressive Party, Rodríguez introduced and spearheaded the approval of the Tennessee Plan Resolution setting the strategy for Puerto Rico's admission as the 51st State of the Union. The Tennessee Plan is so named for the strategy first used by the Territory of Tennessee after Congress ignored its petitions for statehood. The people of Tennessee did not wait for Congress to approve a statehood admission act and proceeded to adopt a state constitution. They also elected two senators to serve in the U.S. Senate and one in the U.S. House of Representatives who went to Congress to demand statehood. Shortly after this bold move Tennessee was admitted to the Union in 1796. The plan was thereafter successfully used by the territories of Michigan, California, Oregon, Kansas, Iowa, and Alaska in their quest for statehood. Rodríguez's oratory skills prompted the NPP delegates to unanimously adopt the Tennessee Plan Resolution.

In 2007, Rodríguez announced he would once again seek the nomination for Resident Commissioner that had eluded him in 2003. He ran in the 2008 New Progressive Party primaries against former senator Miriam Ramirez de Ferrer, who polled 6% of the vote, and former attorney general Pedro Pierluisi, who was endorsed by current Resident Commissioner Luis Fortuño, and won the race with 60% of the vote, while Rodríguez polled 33% of the vote.

Rodriguez was elected Chairman of the Democratic Party of Puerto Rico on February 7, 2017. It was the first time in 30 years that an advocate for statehood for Puerto Rico was elected chairman. Although his election was challenged, the DNC dismissed the challenge and upheld Rodriguez election. He was re-elected Chairman in an open election held on November 21, 2020, with 93% of the votes cast.

Charlie Rodríguez remains active in public discussions on government and political issues particularly concerning Statehood for Puerto Rico

== See also ==
- List of Puerto Ricans
- Senate of Puerto Rico

Senate of Puerto Rico
Preceded by Gilberto Rivera Ortiz	Majority Leader of the Puerto Rico Senate; 1993–1997	Succeeded by José Quique Meléndez
Political offices
Preceded by Roberto Rexach Benítez	President of the Puerto Rico Senate; 1997–2000	Succeeded by Tony Fas Alzamora
Party political offices
Preceded by María Meléndez; Acting	Chair of the Puerto Rico Democratic Party; 2017–2024	Succeeded by Luis Dávila Pernas
U.S. House of Representatives
Preceded by New seat	Shadow Member of the U.S. House of Representatives from Puerto Rico; 2017–2021	Succeeded by Ricardo Rosselló
