= Rafael Hernández Colón =

Governor of the Commonwealth of Puerto Rico

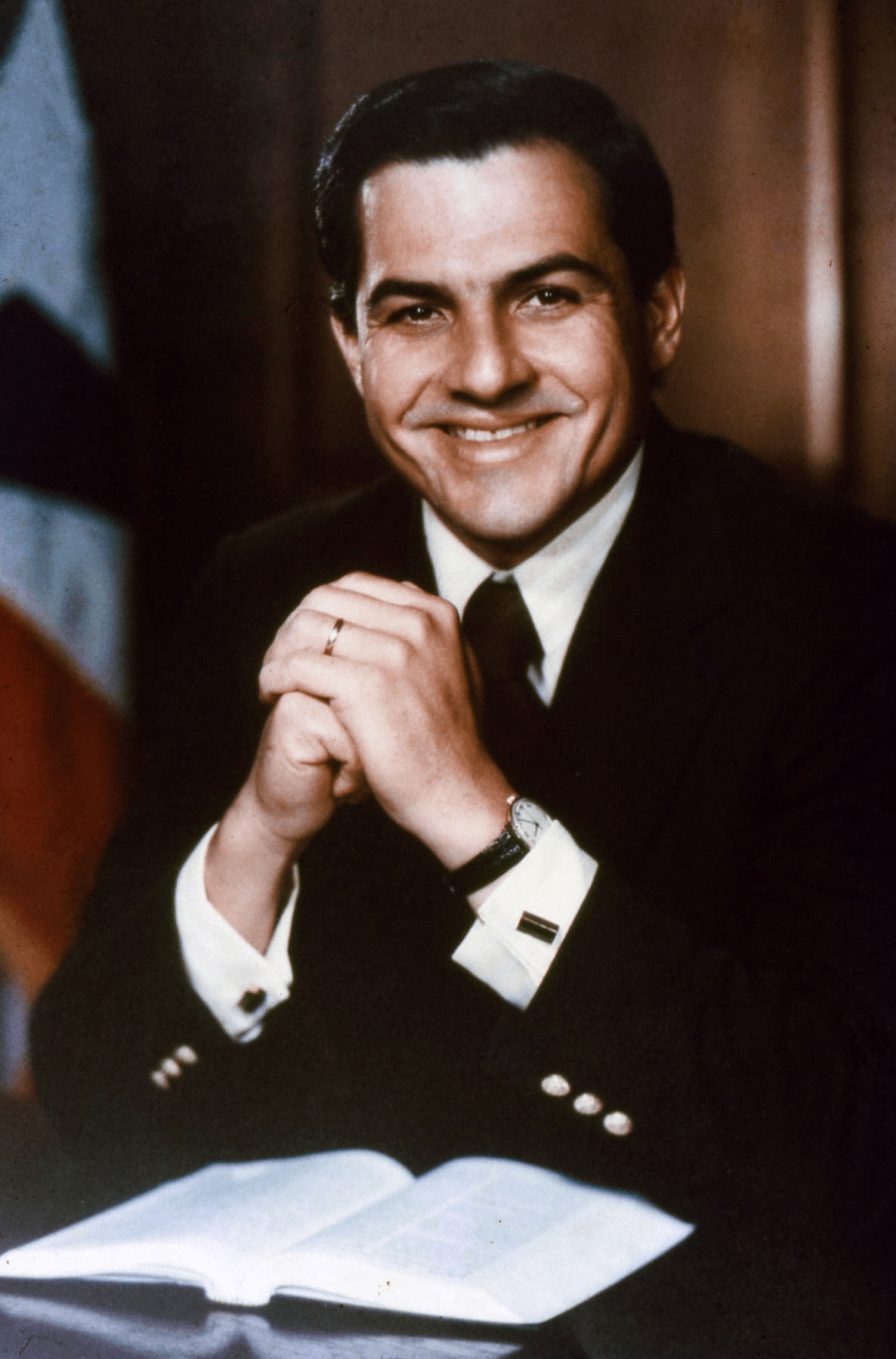
- Hernández Colón in 1973

Governor of Puerto Rico
- In office January 2, 1985 – January 2, 1993
- Preceded by: Carlos Romero Barceló
- Succeeded by: Pedro Rosselló
- In office January 2, 1973 – January 2, 1977
- Preceded by: Luis A. Ferré
- Succeeded by: Carlos Romero Barceló

6th President of the Puerto Rico Senate
- In office January 2, 1969 – January 2, 1973
- Preceded by: Samuel R. Quiñones
- Succeeded by: Juan Cancel Ríos

Secretary of Justice of Puerto Rico
- In office January 2, 1965 – January 2, 1969
- Governor: Roberto Sánchez Vilella
- Preceded by: José Trías Monge
- Succeeded by: Hector Reichard De Cardona

Personal details
- Born: October 24, 1936 Ponce, Puerto Rico
- Died: May 2, 2019 (aged 82) San Juan, Puerto Rico
- Resting place: Cementerio Catolico San Vicente de Paul
- Party: Popular Democratic
- Other political affiliations: Democratic
- Spouses: Lila Mayoral (m. 1959; died 2003) Nelsa López (m. 2004)
- Relations: Pablo Hernández Rivera (grandson)
- Children: 4
- Education: Johns Hopkins University (BA); University of Puerto Rico School of Law (JD)

Rafael Hernández Colón (October 24, 1936 – May 2, 2019) was a Puerto Rican politician who served as the fourth and sixth democratically elected governor of Puerto Rico from 1973 to 1977 and 1985 to 1993. He previously served as the sixth president of the Senate of Puerto Rico from 1969 to 1973.

Having won his first term of office at the age of 36, Hernandez Colón is the youngest person to have served as a popularly elected governor. Having held the office for 12 years, he is also the second longest-serving popularly elected governor, after Luis Muñoz Marín, who served for 16 years. He is the only popularly elected governor to have served non-consecutive terms of office. He ran for governor in 1972, 1976, 1980, 1984, and 1988, making him the person to have run for governor the most times.

During his time as governor under the pro-commonwealth Popular Democratic Party (PPD), Hernández Colón sponsored ambitious programs of economic development and housing construction. He also defended the political status quo of Puerto Rico as unincorporated territory of the United States, opposing the efforts by President Ford to make the archipelago and island the 51st state of the United States.

== Early years and education ==
Hernández Colón was born October 24, 1937, in Ponce, Puerto Rico, to Rafael Hernández Matos and Doraldina "Dora" Colón Clavell. Rafael and Dora married in 1934 and had three children. Rafael was the oldest. Rafael had two brothers José A. (born 1939) and César A. (1942). Hernández Colón graduated from Valley Forge Military Academy and College in Wayne, Pennsylvania, then obtained a bachelor's degree in political science from Johns Hopkins University in 1956 where he graduated with honors. In 1959, he obtained his degree in law from the University of Puerto Rico at Rio Piedras, graduating magna cum laude and as valedictorian of his class. Between 1961 and 1965 he was a lecturer on civil procedure at the Pontifical Catholic University of Puerto Rico in Ponce.

== Political career ==
Hernández Colón affiliated himself with the Popular Democratic Party of Puerto Rico (Partido Popular Democrático, PPD). He served as Associate Commissioner of Public Service under the governorship of Roberto Sánchez Vilella. In 1965 he was named Secretary of the Department of Justice.

=== President of the Senate ===
Hernández Colón was elected to the Senate of Puerto Rico in the 1968 elections, in which his party retained control of the Senate but lost the governorship and House of Representatives. As President of the Senate, Hernández Colón became the Popular Democratic Party's president and main opposition leader. As a Senator, he proposed a constitutional amendment to lower the minimum voting age to 18, which passed in 1970. He also spearheaded efforts to persuade Congress to stop bombing practices on the island of Culebra. On the issue of political status, he opposed Governor Ferré's creation of an Ad Hoc Committee for the Presidential Vote, alleging that it was a misleading effort to enhance the island's current Commonwealth status in accordance with the results of the 1967 status plebiscite. In 1972, he successfully ran for Governor of Puerto Rico, defeating the incumbent by approximately 95,000 votes, or 7.3%. He remains the last PDP gubernatorial candidate to have achieved victory with over 50% of votes.

=== First term (1973–1977) ===
dignitaries at the 1974 dedication of Roberto Clemente Park in Miami, Florida; from left to right: unidentified man, Hernandez, Reubin Askew (governor of Florida), Maurice Ferré (mayor of Miami), Claude Pepper (U.S. Congressman), Mildred Pepper

During his first term, the island was wracked by recession, induced by the 1973 oil crisis, which hit Puerto Rico particularly hard because of the many businesses that were directly related to petroleum processing in Puerto Rico. After enacting austerity measures and tax increases, the economy recovered by 1976.

In 1973, he appointed, alongside President Richard Nixon, an Ad Hoc Committee for Puerto Rico to enhance Puerto Rico's Commonwealth status pursuant to the people's mandate in the 1967 elections. The Committee rendered a report and proposal for a Compact of Permanent Union Between Puerto Rico and the United States that expanded Puerto Rico's autonomy over local affairs, expanded its right to participate in international matters, created a mechanism to object to the automatic application of federal laws, and allowed for the election of a delegate to the U.S. Senate. President Gerald Ford, who replaced Nixon, did not react to the report until after the 1976 elections, when he proposed statehood for the island. According to Hernández Colón, his delayed response was due to political pressure by island Republicans, who supported Ford in his primary against Ronald Reagan. Nevertheless, the Compact was approved by the House Subcommittee on Insular Affairs.

In 1974, Time magazine recognized Rafael Hernández Colón as one of the world's young leaders.

Hernández Colón, Treasury Secretary Salvador Casellas, and Resident Commissioner Jaime Benítez successfully lobbied Congress for Section 936, which created a tax incentive for U.S. corporations that established in Puerto Rico. The incentive remained active until 1996, when Congress enacted a phase-out which ended in 2006. Its elimination is often credited as one of the main causes for Puerto Rico's current fiscal and economic crisis.

Hernández Colón also signed Law No. 80 of 1976, which required just cause for terminating employment. In 2018, Law 80 became a hotly debated issue when the governor proposed its elimination.

Hernández Colón lost the 1976 race for Governor to then Mayor of San Juan, Carlos Romero Barceló, by 3%. He then lost again to Romero Barceló in 1980, in this second matchup by a slim margin of approximately 3,000 votes, or 0.2%.

=== Second and third terms (1985–1993) ===
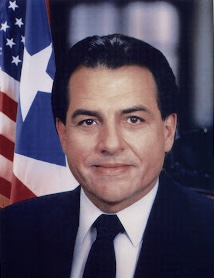
1985 portrait photograph

Hernández Colón ran again against Romero Barceló in the November 1984 elections and was victorious by about 54,000 votes (48 to 45% respectively). He won re-election in the 1988 election, besting his main rival Baltasar Corrada del Río by 49 to 46%.

As part of his 1984 electoral campaign, Hernández Colón released a musical album with Puerto Rican country music titled Ahora Es Que Vamos ("Here We Go Now").

In 1991, Hernández Colón signed a law stating that the only official language of Puerto Rico should be Spanish. The immediate effect was that English was no longer the second official language. While many applauded the governor's decision, on the other hand, supporters of the Commonwealth and the parties in favor of the American federal state interpreted this law as a threat to their ideologies. In 1993, his successor Pedro Rosselló rescinded the law and reinstated English as the official language, alongside Spanish.

During this time Puerto Rico experienced an economic boom with GDP growth at 5% during the years 1987–1989 the highest since Operation Bootstrap and the Economic Boom in the United States. Unemployment dropped drastically in his term from an all-time high 25% in 1983 to 12.0% in 1990. He lost popularity with the controversial Pabellón de Sevilla that was an attempt of a representation of Puerto Rico at the Universal Exposition of Seville in 1992. In January 1992 Hernández announced that he would not seek re-election. On January 11, he resigned as President of the Popular Democratic Party, a post he had held for 23 years. Senator Victoria Muñoz Mendoza succeeded him as president of the party and later became a gubernatorial candidate herself.

== Personal life ==
On October 24, 1959, Hernández Colón married Lila Mayoral Wirshing, daughter of the industrialist Juan Eugenio Mayoral Renovales (1906-1967), founder of Ponce Candy Industries. Rafael Hernández Colón and Lila Mayoral had four children: Rafael, Jose Alfredo, Dora Mercedes and Juan Eugenio. The latter was elected to Puerto Rico's Senate. In early 2003, Lila Mayoral Wirshing died of cancer. Hernández Colón subsequently married attorney Nelsa López in late 2004. He had his main residence in his hometown of Ponce, in the historic downtown district.

=== Retirement ===
Hernández Colón published various works specializing in law. Among his works are Procedimiento Civil: Trayectoria Histórica de la Autonomía Política Puertorriqueña and Nueva Tesis (Note: The ISBN of this work is 84-599-6756-5.) which discusses the Puerto Rican Commonwealth's political relationship with the United States.

In later years, Hernández Colón maintained his distance from public political engagement, but continued to be involved in Puerto Rico's political affairs assisting active politicians. He occasionally appeared at official events. For example, in December 2011, he publicly admitted before the Senate of Puerto Rico that "the U.S. Congress can do as it wishes with Puerto Rico."

Some political analysts speculated that Hernández exerted sizeable control over the PDP's party structure during his retirement from office, which may have rivaled the PDP president's.

=== Illness and death ===
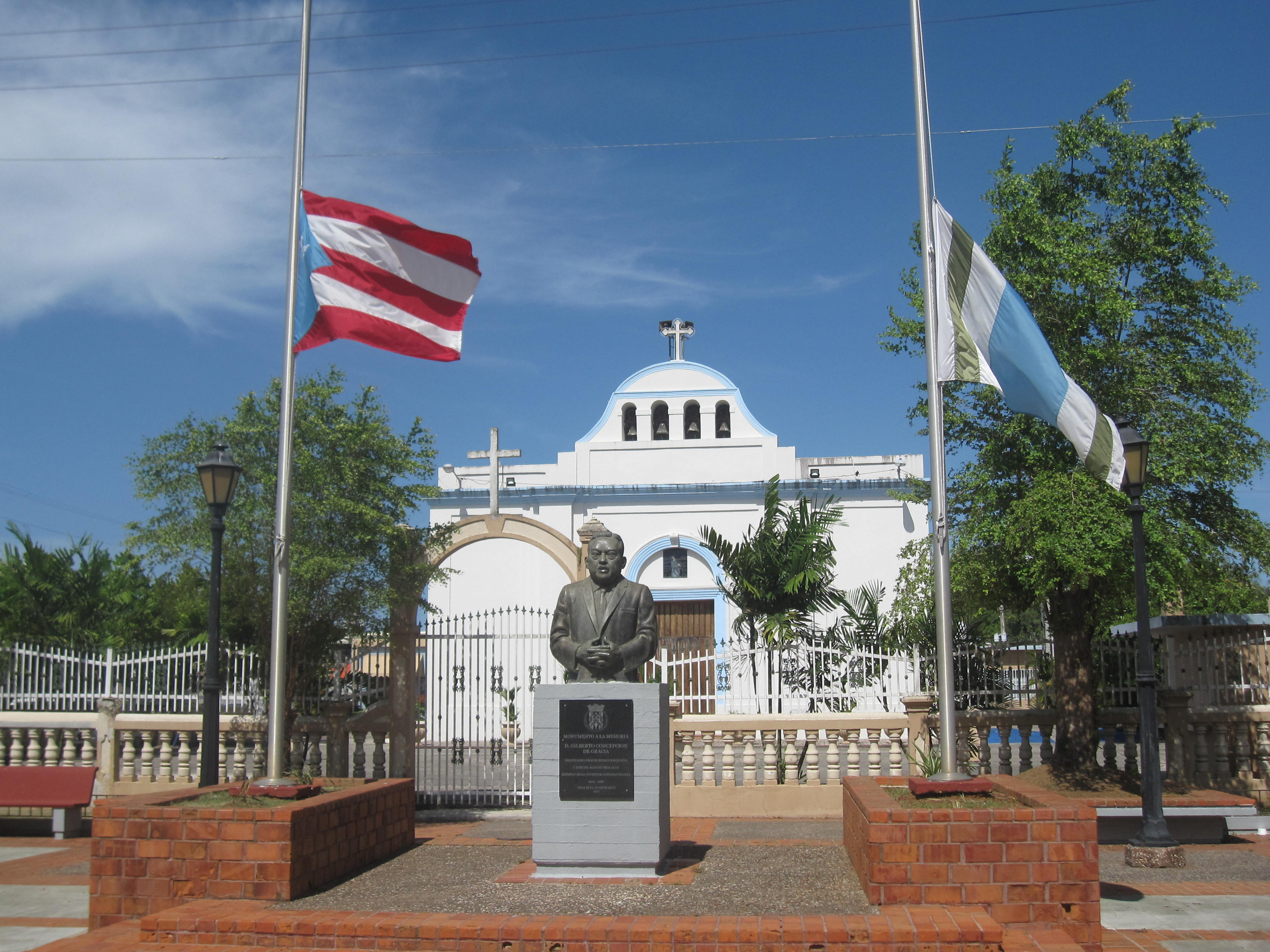
Flags at half-mast in the Vega Alta square after Hernández death on May 2, 2019

On December 6, 2018, Hernández Colón announced he had been diagnosed with leukemia in November of that year. Hernández Colón died on May 2, 2019, at the age of 82. He was interred at Cementerio Católico San Vicente de Paul. (Note: An article in "La Perla del Sur" stated he would be interred at "Cementerio Las Mercedes" but this is incorrect as every other report states he was interred at Cementerio Católico San Vicente de Paul and, specifically in the Serralles Mausoleum there.) Flags were flown at half-mast by the municipalities after his death.

== Accolades ==
Hernández Colón was granted honoris causa degrees from Johns Hopkins University and Seton Hall University. He also had an honorary degree from the Pontifical Catholic University of Puerto Rico, where he served as a law professor in the university's Law School.

In 1985, Hernández Colón was awarded the Order of Merit of Duarte, Sánchez and Mella by the government of the Dominican Republic. In 1987 he was awarded the Cross of Isabella the Catholic by King Juan Carlos I and the government of Spain. That same year he was awarded the "Grand Cordón del Libertador" by the government of Venezuela, the Harvard Foundation Award, and the Spirit of the Caribbean Award. In 1989 he was awarded the Olympic Order Award.

On October 18, 1991, at the Campoamor Theater in Oviedo, Spain, Hernández Colón received the Prince of Asturias Award for Literature that was granted to the people of Puerto Rico by Felipe de Borbón.

== See also ==
- List of governors of Puerto Rico
- Club of Rome
- Fundación Biblioteca Rafael Hernández Colón

== Notes ==
Legal offices
Preceded by José Trías Monge	Secretary of Justice of Puerto Rico; 1965–1969	Succeeded by ???
Political offices
Preceded by Samuel R. Quiñones	President of the Puerto Rico Senate; 1969–1972	Succeeded by Juan Cancel Ríos
Preceded by Luis A. Ferré	Governor of Puerto Rico; 1973–1977	Succeeded by Carlos Romero Barceló
Preceded by Carlos Romero Barceló	Governor of Puerto Rico; 1985–1993	Succeeded by Pedro Rosselló
Party political offices
Preceded by Luis Muñoz Marín	Chair of the Puerto Rico Popular Democratic Party; 1972–1976	Succeeded by Miguel Hernández Agosto
Preceded by Luis Negrón López	Popular Democratic nominee for Governor of Puerto Rico; 1972, 1976, 1980, 1984, 1988	Succeeded by Victoria Muñoz Mendoza
Preceded by Miguel Hernández Agosto	Chair of the Puerto Rico Popular Democratic Party; 1984–1992	Succeeded by Victoria Muñoz Mendoza
