= Miguel Hernández Agosto =

Puerto Rican politician (1927–2016)

The Honorable Miguel Hernández Agosto
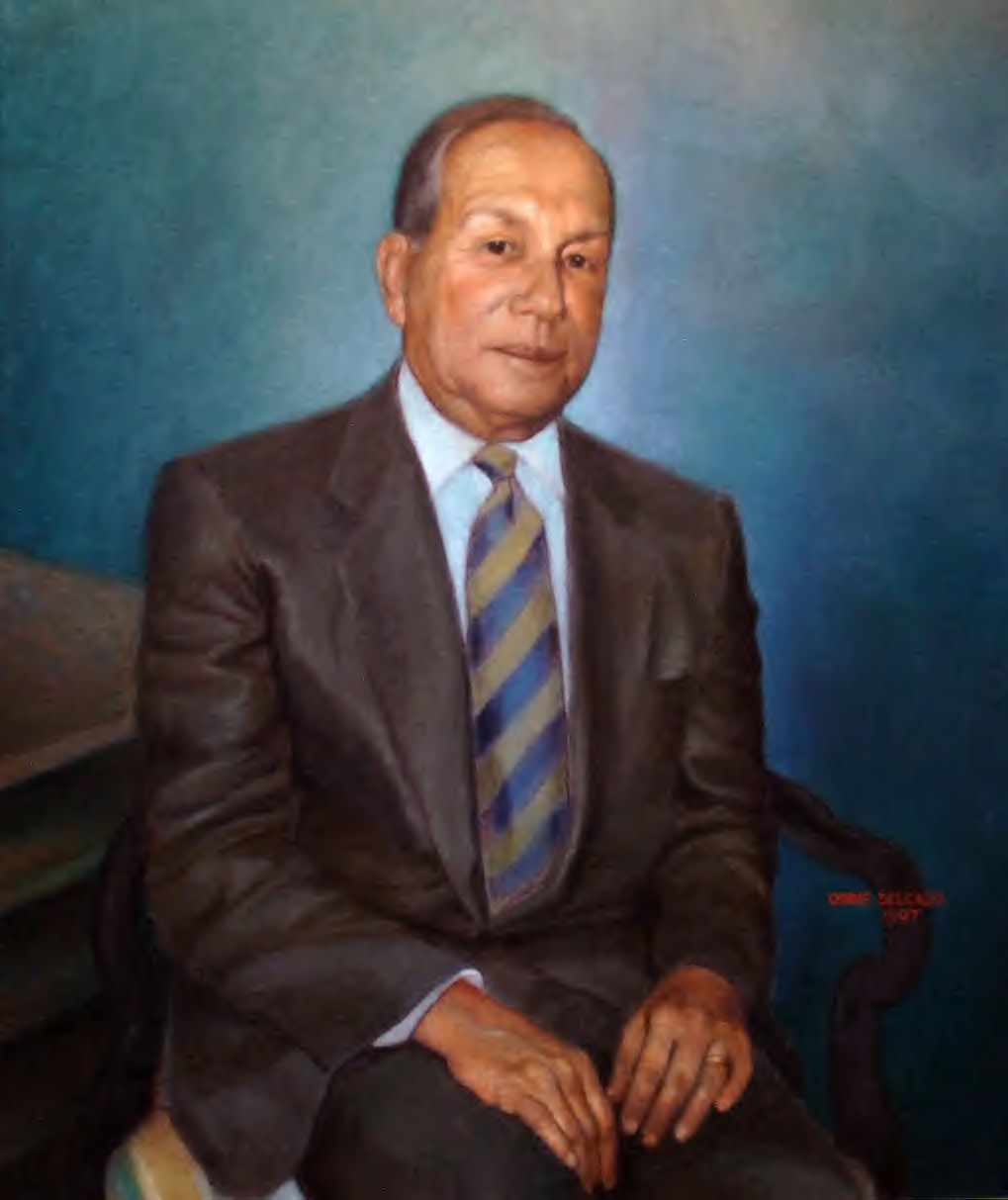

9th President of the Senate of Puerto Rico
- In office January 2, 1981 – December 31, 1992
- Preceded by: Luis A. Ferré
- Succeeded by: Roberto Rexach Benítez

President pro tempore of the Senate of Puerto Rico
- In office 1973–1976
- Preceded by: Juan Cancel Ríos
- Succeeded by: Manuel Ramos Barroso

Member of the Senate of Puerto Rico from At-large district
- In office 1970–1997

Minority Leader of the Puerto Rico Senate
- In office 1977–1981

Secretary of Agriculture of Puerto Rico
- In office 1965–1968
- Governor: Roberto Sánchez Vilella

Personal details
- Born: April 5, 1927 Las Piedras, Puerto Rico
- Died: March 18, 2016 (aged 88) San Juan, Puerto Rico
- Resting place: Los Angeles Memorial Park Cemetery in Guaynabo, Puerto Rico
- Party: Popular Democratic Party
- Other political affiliations: Democratic
- Spouse: María Casanova
- Education: University of Puerto Rico at Mayagüez (BAgr); Michigan State University (MS); University of Michigan; Interamerican University of Puerto Rico School of Law (JD)
- Profession: Politician, lawyer

Miguel Hernández Agosto (April 5, 1927 – March 18, 2016) was a Puerto Rican politician whose service in government spanned several generations. Affiliated with the Popular Democratic Party (PPD), he started his political career as a Cabinet member, but eventually became a Senator at-large. Hernández Agosto served as President of the Senate of Puerto Rico for 12 years (1981-1993).

== Early years and education ==
Hernández Agosto was born on April 5, 1927, in Las Piedras, Puerto Rico.

Hernández Agosto finished his bachelor studies in agricultural sciences from the University of Puerto Rico at Mayagüez at the age of 19. The following year, he completed a master's degree from Michigan State University, and later a PhD from University of Michigan. In 1970 he earned a Juris Doctor from the Interamerican University of Puerto Rico School of Law. Hernández Agosto isa member of the Latino fraternity Phi Iota Alpha, the oldest inter-collegiate Greek-letter organization established for Latino Americans.

== Professional career ==
During his youth, Hernández Agosto served as a science and math teacher at high schools in Humacao and Juncos.

== Public service ==
From 1960 to 1965, Hernández Agosto served as executive director of the Puerto Rico Lands Authority under Gov. Luis Muñoz Marín, who subsequently appointed him as Secretary of the Puerto Rico Department of Agriculture, a position he also held under the governorship of Roberto Sánchez Vilella.

In 1970, he entered electoral politics as a senator at-large, filling the vacancy created by the resignation of then-Sen. Muñoz Marín. Two years later, he was elected senator for the Popular Democratic Party (PPD). One year after his election, he was named vice-president of the Senate. Hernández Agosto was reelected in 1976 and appointed as minority speaker.

In 1981, after being reelected again, Hernández Agosto became the Senate of Puerto Rico's ninth president, a position he held for 12 years. In 1993, after the Popular Democratic Party of Puerto Rico's defeat in the 1992 elections, he became again the Senate Minority Leader of his party until 1996.

Hernández Agosto was president of the Popular Democratic Party from 1978 to 1981, and presided the Committee for the Quincentenary of the discovery of America and Puerto Rico.

At the national level, Hernández Agosto was affiliated with the Democratic Party. After winning a bruising reorganization primary campaign in 1988 against former Governor Carlos Romero Barceló, he became State Chair of the Democratic Party of Puerto Rico, a post he held until 1992.

== Retirement and death ==
In his final years, Hernández Agosto was a part-time law professor at the Interamerican University of Puerto Rico School of Law and practiced law. In 2008, he chaired then-Gov. Aníbal Acevedo Vilá's unsuccessful reelection campaign.

Hernández Agosto died on March 18, 2016, at age 88. He was buried at the Los Angeles Memorial Park Cemetery in Guaynabo, Puerto Rico. Gov. Alejandro García Padilla ordered flags to be raised at half-staff for five days in his honor.

== See also ==
- List of Puerto Ricans
- Senate of Puerto Rico

Political offices
Preceded by Luis A. Ferré	President of the Senate of Puerto Rico; 1981–1993	Succeeded by Roberto Rexach Benítez
Senate of Puerto Rico
Preceded by José Manuel Ramos Barroso	President pro tempore of the Senate of Puerto Rico; 1973–1977	Succeeded by Juan Cancel Ríos
Preceded by José Menéndez Monroig	Minority Leader of the Puerto Rico Senate; 1977–1981	Succeeded by Nicolás Nogueras
Party political offices
Preceded by Rafael Hernández Colón	Chair of the Puerto Rico Popular Democratic Party; 1976–1984	Succeeded by Rafael Hernández Colón
