= Luisa Lebrón =

Puerto Rican judge and politician

Member of the Puerto Rico Senate from the Carolina district
- In office 1993–2000

President pro tempore of the Senate of Puerto Rico
- In office 1995–1996
- Preceded by: Nicolás Nogueras
- Succeeded by: Aníbal Marrero Pérez

Member of the Municipal Assembly of Trujillo Alto, Puerto Rico
- In office 2020

Personal details
- Born: May 17, 1949 (age 77) Arroyo, Puerto Rico
- Party: New Progressive Party
- Education: University of Puerto Rico (BA) University of Puerto Rico School of Law (JD)
- Profession: Politician, Senator, Judge

Luisa Lebrón Burgos (born May 17, 1949, in Patillas, Puerto Rico) is a Puerto Rican judge, politician, and former senator. She was a member of the Senate of Puerto Rico from 1993 to 2000.

== Biography ==
Luisa Lebrón Burgos was born May 17, 1949, in Arroyo, Puerto Rico. She received her bachelor's degree from the University of Puerto Rico. In 1974, she received her Juris doctor from the University of Puerto Rico School of Law.

Lebrón worked as a legal aide for the Housing Department of Puerto Rico, and the Corporation of Urban and Housing Renewal. She was also president of the Attorney Delegation of Carolina. She also established her own law firm.

In 1992, Lebrón was elected to the Senate of Puerto Rico representing the District of Carolina. In 1995, she was appointed as President pro tempore of the Senate of Puerto Rico, becoming the first woman to occupy that position. Lebrón was reelected in 1996.

Lebrón ran again in the 2000 elections, but lost to the candidates of the Popular Democratic Party. She served as a judge in the Carolina region.

== See also ==
- Senate of Puerto Rico

Senate of Puerto Rico
Preceded by Nicolás Nogueras	President pro tempore of the Senate of Puerto Rico; 1995–1996	Succeeded by Aníbal Marrero Pérez
