= Luis Felipe Navas =

Puerto Rican politician

Member of the Puerto Rico Senate from the Humacao district
- In office January 2, 1993 – January 1, 2001

Personal details
- Born: September 13, 1942 (age 84) San Juan, Puerto Rico
- Party: New Progressive Party (PNP)
- Education: University of Puerto Rico at Mayagüez (BAgr); Interamerican University of Puerto Rico School of Law (JD)
- Profession: Politician, Lawyer

Luis Felipe Navas de León is a Puerto Rican politician from the New Progressive Party (PNP). He served as member of the Senate of Puerto Rico from 1993 to 2001.

Navas was elected to the Senate of Puerto Rico in the 1992 general election. He represented the District of Humacao. Navas was reelected at the 1996 general election.

Graduated at Gautier Benítez High School in Caguas, Puerto Rico. He has a degree in Agronomy with a specialty in Economics at the University of Puerto Rico at Mayagüez. Working at the Federal Land Bank he obtained his second profession, that of Real Estate Appraiser. He also earned a Juris Doctor from the Interamerican University of Puerto Rico School of Law. Hes been a long time resident in Aguas Buenas, Puerto Rico

Navas ran for a third term at the 2000 general elections, but was defeated by the candidates of the PPD. After that, he was appointed Superior Judge of the Court of First Instance. After leaving the Judiciary, he returned to the private law practice.

In 2012, while working as Director of the Office of Technical Evaluations of the Senate, Navas was appointed as alternate member of the Board for the Special Independent Attorney General (or FEI).

== See also ==
- 21st Senate of Puerto Rico
