= 1976 Puerto Rican general election =

- November 2, 1976
- Gubernatorial election
- Turnout: 86.09%
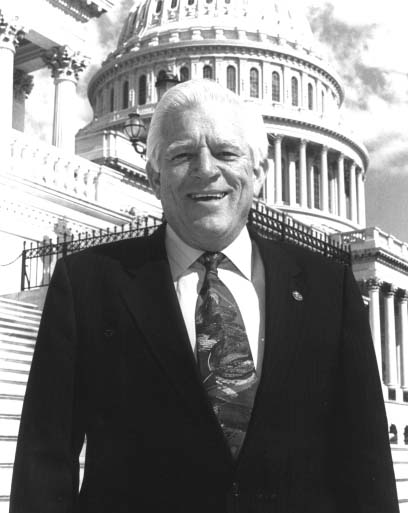

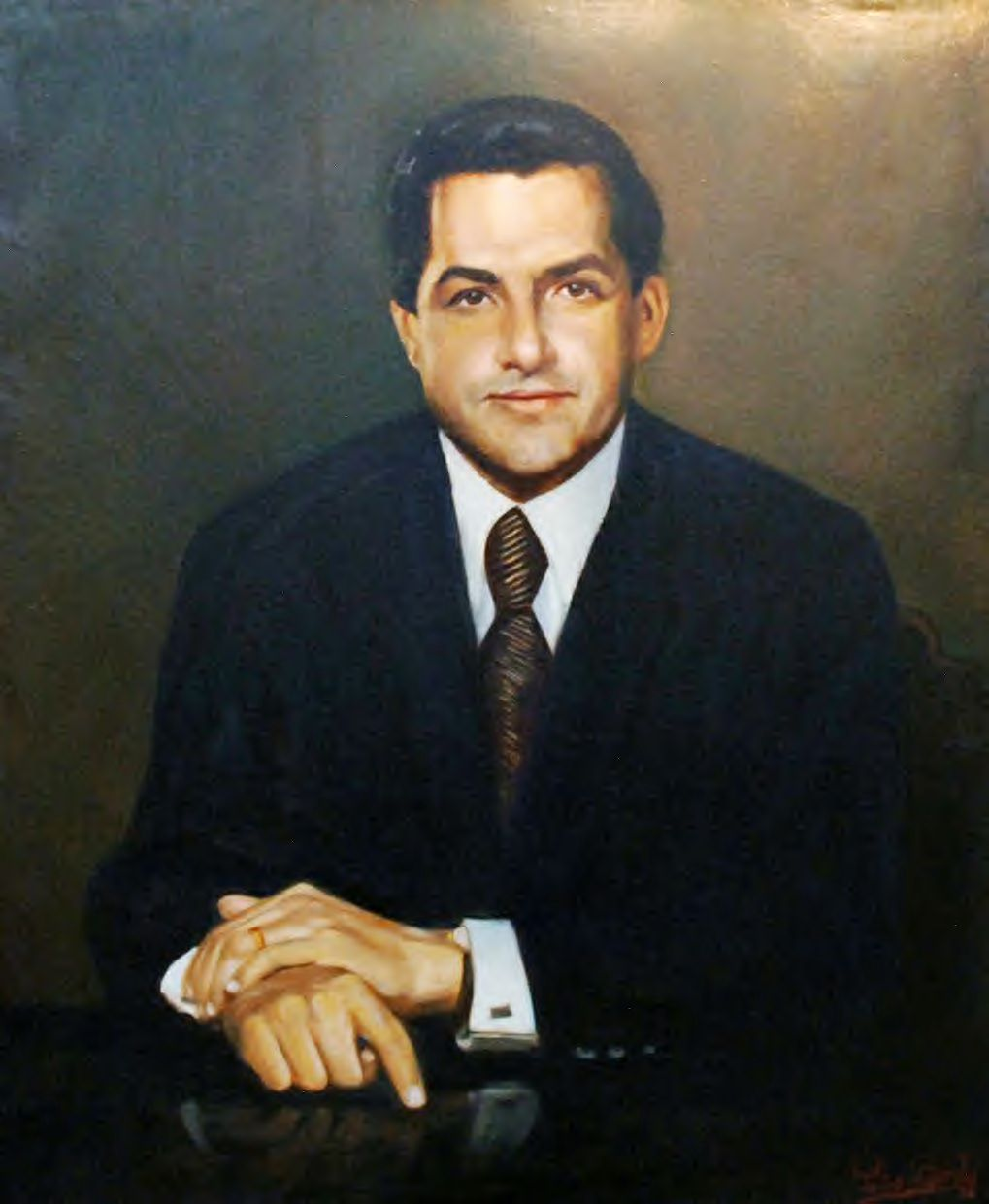

Nominee	Carlos Romero Barceló	Rafael Hernández Colón	Rubén Berríos
Party	New Progressive	Popular Democratic	Independence
Alliance	Democratic	Democratic
Popular vote	703,968	660,401	82,037
Percentage	48.28%	45.29%	5.69%
- Results by municipality Barceló: 40–50% 50–60% 60–70% Colón: 40–50% 50–60% 60–70%
Governor before election
Rafael Hernández Colón
Popular Democratic
Elected Governor
Carlos Romero Barceló
New Progressive
- Resident Commissioner election
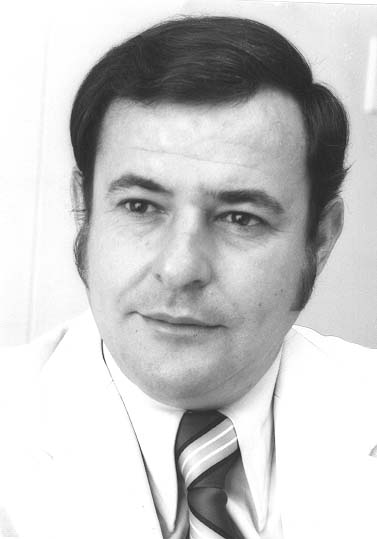

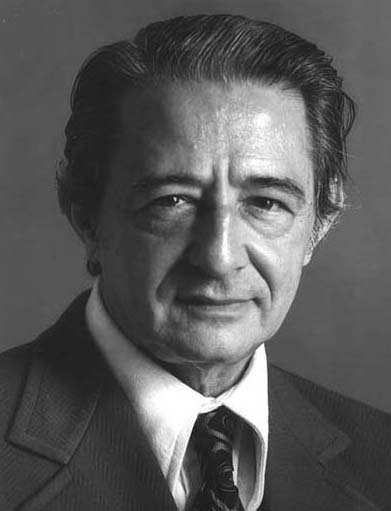

Nominee	Baltasar Corrada del Río	Jaime Benítez Rexach	Baltasar Quiñones Elias
Party	New Progressive	Popular Democratic	Independence
Alliance	Democratic	Democratic
Popular vote	705,162	663,160	72,988
Percentage	48.93%	46.01%	5.06%

General elections were held in Puerto Rico on November 2, 1976. Carlos Romero Barceló of the New Progressive Party (PNP) was elected Governor, whilst the PNP also won a majority of the seats in the House of Representatives and the Senate. Voter turnout was 86.1%.

== Results ==
=== Governor ===
Candidate	Party	Votes	%
Carlos Romero Barceló	New Progressive Party	703,968	48.28
Rafael Hernández Colón	Popular Democratic Party	660,401	45.29
Rubén Berríos	Puerto Rican Independence Party	83,037	5.69
Juan Mari Brás	Puerto Rican Socialist Party	10,728	0.74
Total		1,458,134	100.00
Valid votes		1,458,134	99.56
Invalid/blank votes		6,466	0.44
Total votes		1,464,600	100.00
Registered voters/turnout		1,701,217	86.09
Source: Nohlen

=== Resident Commissioner ===
Candidate	Party	Votes	%
Baltasar Corrada del Río	New Progressive Party	705,162	48.93
Jaime Benítez Rexach	Popular Democratic Party	663,160	46.01
Baltasar Quiñones Elias	Puerto Rican Independence Party	72,988	5.06
Total		1,441,310	100.00
Source: House of Representatives

=== House of Representatives ===
Party	Seats	+/–
New Progressive Party	33	+18
Popular Democratic Party	18	–19
Puerto Rican Independence Party	0	–2
Puerto Rican Socialist Party	0	New
Total	51	–3
Source: Nohlen

=== Senate ===
Party	Seats	+/–
New Progressive Party	14	+6
Popular Democratic Party	13	–7
Puerto Rican Independence Party	0	–1
Total	27	–2
Source: Nohlen
