= 1972 Puerto Rican general election =

- November 7, 1972
- Gubernatorial election
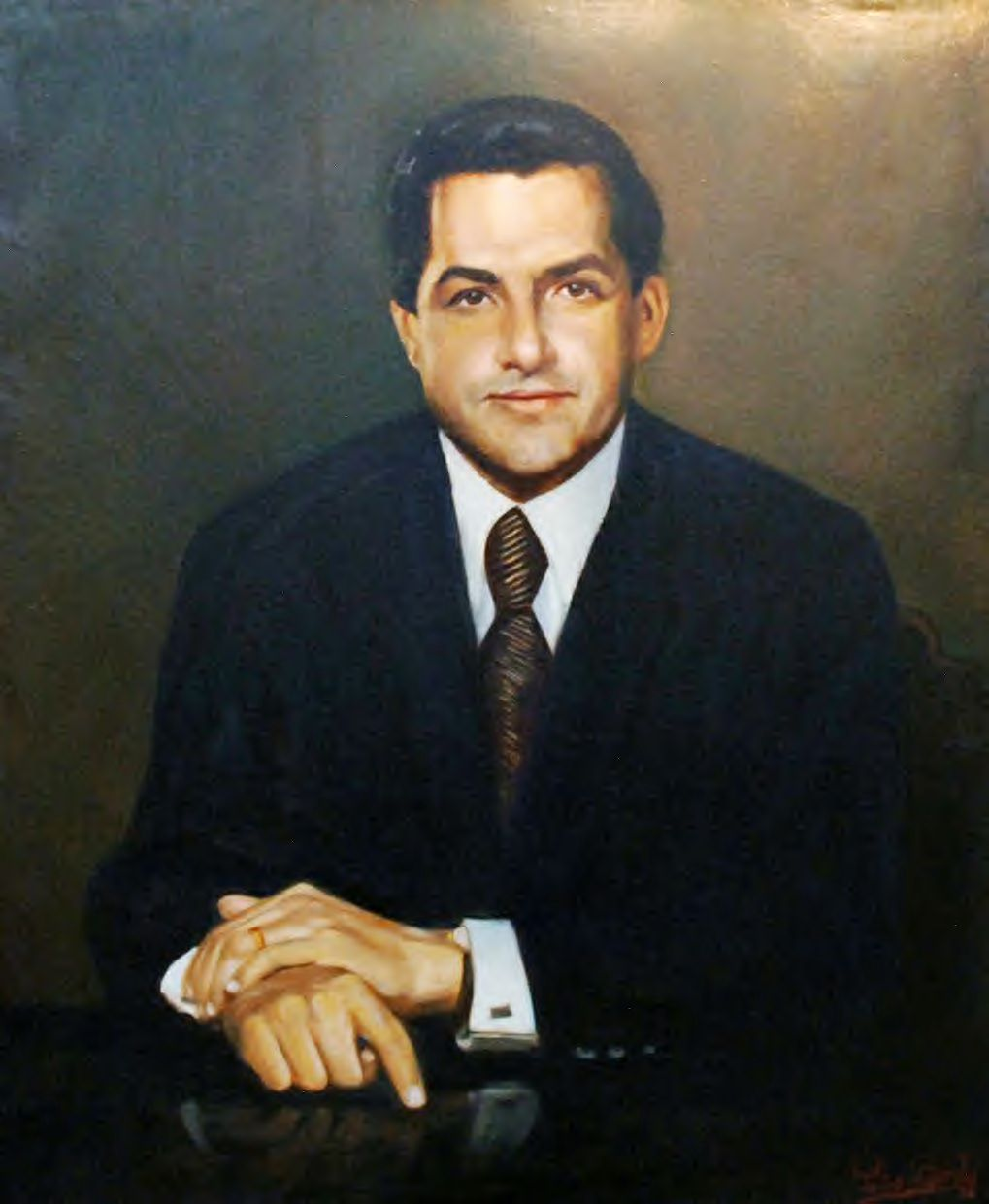

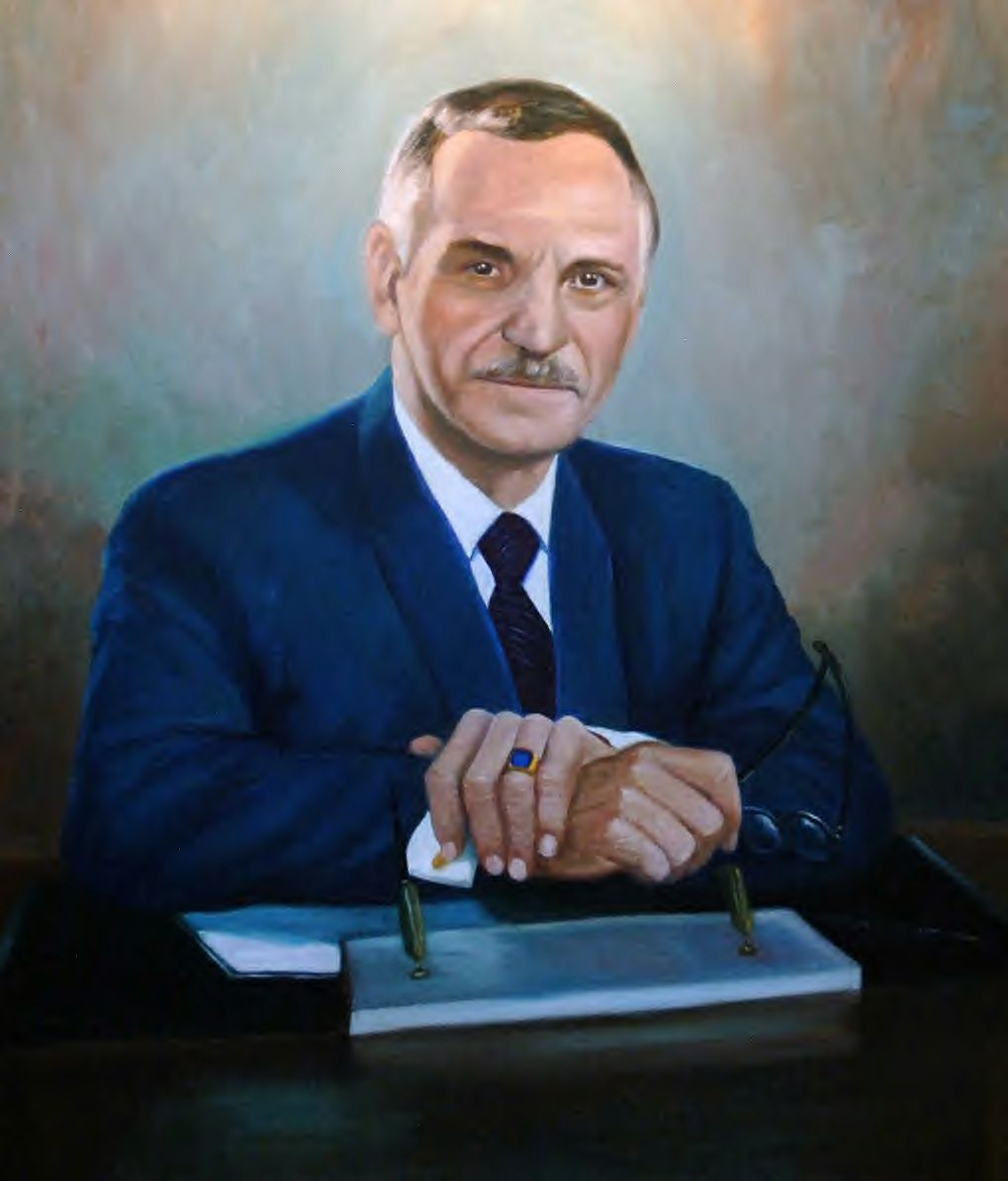

Nominee	Rafael Hernández Colón	Luis A. Ferré	Noel Colón Martinez
Party	Popular Democratic	New Progressive	Independence
Alliance	Democratic	Republican
Popular vote	658,856	563,609	69,654
Percentage	50.99%	43.62%	5.36%
- Results by municipality Colón: 40–50% 50–60% 60–70% Ferré: 40–50% 50–60%
Governor before election
Luis A. Ferré
New Progressive
Elected Governor
Rafael Hernández Colón
Popular Democratic
- Resident Commissioner election
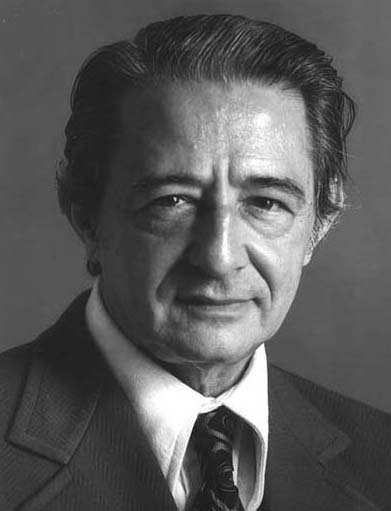

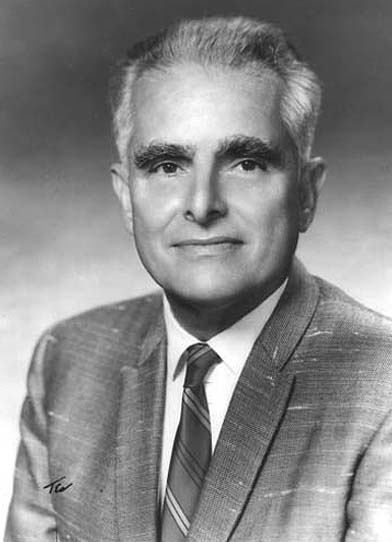

Nominee	Jaime Benítez	Jorge Luis Córdova	Jorge Morales-Yordan
Party	Popular Democratic	New Progressive	Independence
Alliance	Democratic	Republican
Popular vote	656,885	560,119	64,964
Percentage	50.93%	43.43%	5.04%

General elections were held in Puerto Rico on November 7, 1972. Rafael Hernández Colón of the Popular Democratic Party (PPD) was elected Governor, whilst the PPD also won a majority of the seats in the House of Representatives and the Senate. Voter turnout was 80%.

== Results ==
=== Governor ===
Candidate	Party	Votes	%
Rafael Hernández Colón	Popular Democratic Party	658,856	50.69
Luis A. Ferré	New Progressive Party	563,609	43.36
Noel Colón Martínez	Puerto Rican Independence Party	69,654	5.36
Alfredo Nazario Tirado	People's Party	4,007	0.31
Antonio J. González	Puerto Rican Union Party	3,291	0.25
Jorge Luis Landing	Authentic Party for Sovereignty	467	0.04
Total		1,299,884	100.00
Registered voters/turnout		1,555,504	–
Source: Nohlen, Puerto Rico Election Archive

=== Resident Commissioner ===
Candidate	Party	Votes	%
Jaime Benítez Rexach	Popular Democratic Party	656,885	50.93
Jorge Luis Córdova	New Progressive Party	560,119	43.43
Jorge Morales-Yordan	Puerto Rican Independence Party	64,964	5.04
Luis F. Camacho	People's Party	4,854	0.38
Álvaro Calderón	Puerto Rican Union Party	2,483	0.19
Ángel A. Fuentes	Authentic Party for Sovereignty	456	0.04
Total		1,289,761	100.00
Source: House of Representatives

=== House of Representatives ===
Party	Seats	+/–
Popular Democratic Party	37	+11
New Progressive Party	15	–10
Puerto Rican Independence Party	2	+2
People's Party	0	0
Puerto Rican Union Party	0	New
Authentic Party for Sovereignty	0	New
Total	54	+3
Source: Nohlen

=== Senate ===
Party	Seats	+/–
Popular Democratic Party	20	+5
New Progressive Party	8	–4
Puerto Rican Independence Party	1	+1
Total	29	+2
Source: Nohlen
