= Víctor Marrero Padilla =

Puerto Rican politician (1938–2023)

Member of the Puerto Rico Senate from the Arecibo district
- In office 1993–2000

Personal details
- Born: August 8, 1938 Morovis, Puerto Rico
- Died: April 18, 2023 (aged 84) Vega Baja, Puerto Rico
- Party: New Progressive Party
- Education: University of Puerto Rico at Mayagüez (BAgr)
- Profession: Politician, farmer

Víctor Marrero Padilla (1938 – April 18, 2023), also known as El Búho, was a Puerto Rican politician who served as a Senator. He was a member of the Senate of Puerto Rico from 1993 until his conviction of corruption in 2000.

== Biography ==
Víctor Marrero had a bachelor in agronomy from the University of Puerto Rico at Mayagüez. He was first elected to the Senate of Puerto Rico at the 1992 general elections and was reelected in 1996.

In 2000, Marrero was accused of illegally appropriating $600 destined for an air conditioner for a medical clinic at the Ramón Marín Sola housing project in Arecibo. He was tried and found guilty by a jury on October 11, 2000 with a verdict of 11–1.

The family of Marrero maintain his innocence, but were not able to get a new trial for him.

Marrero died in Vega Baja on April 18, 2023, at the age of 84.

== See also ==
- Senate of Puerto Rico
