= 1980 Puerto Rican general election =

- November 4, 1980
- Gubernatorial election
- Turnout: 88.26%
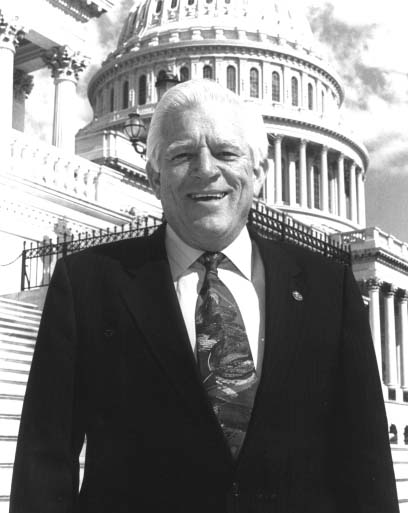

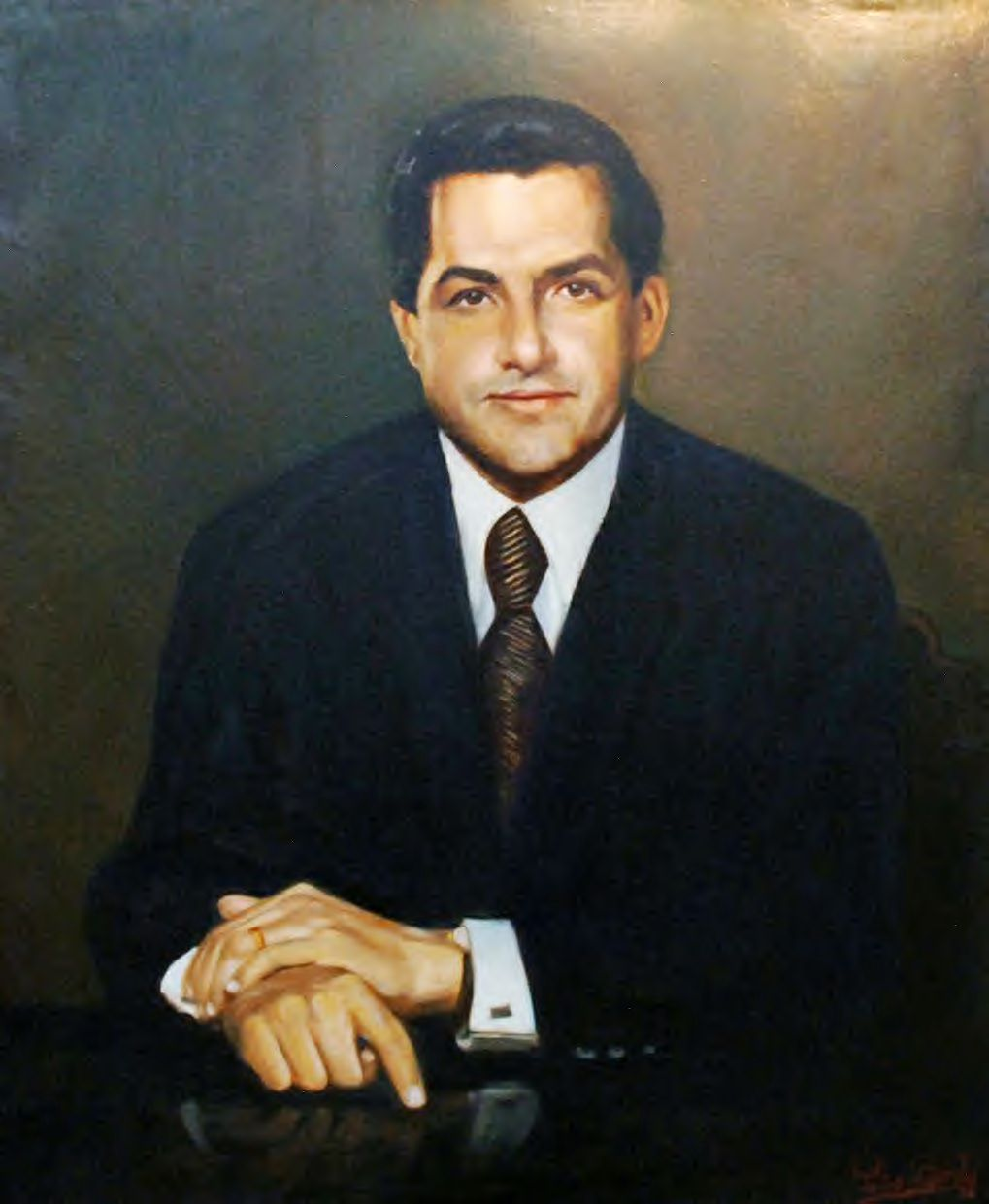

Nominee	Carlos Romero Barceló	Rafael Hernández Colón	Rubén Berríos
Party	New Progressive	Popular Democratic	Independence
Alliance	Democratic	Democratic
Popular vote	759,926	756,889	87,272
Percentage	47.22%	47.03%	5.42%
- Results by municipality Barceló: 40–50% 50–60% 60–70% Colón: 40–50% 50–60% 60–70%
Governor before election
Carlos Romero Barceló
New Progressive
Elected Governor
Carlos Romero Barceló
New Progressive
- Resident Commissioner election
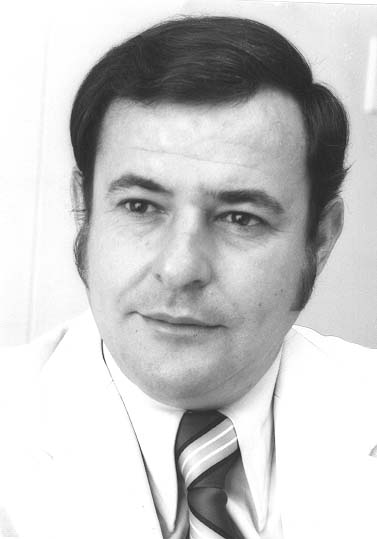

Nominee	Baltasar Corrada del Río	José Arsenio Torres	Marta Font de Calero
Party	New Progressive	Popular Democratic	Independence
Alliance	Democratic
Popular vote	760,484	749,531	83,911
Percentage	47.71%	47.02%	5.26%
- Results by municipality Río: 40–50% 50–60% 60–70% Torres: 40–50% 50–60% 60–70%

General elections were held in Puerto Rico on November 4, 1980. Carlos Romero Barceló of the New Progressive Party (PNP) was re-elected Governor. In the House of Representatives elections the PNP received a plurality of votes, but the Popular Democratic Party won a majority of the seats. They also won a majority of seats in the Senate. Voter turnout was 88%.

== Results ==
=== Governor ===
Candidate	Party	Votes	%
Carlos Romero Barceló	New Progressive Party	759,926	47.22
Rafael Hernández Colón	Popular Democratic Party	756,889	47.03
Rubén Berríos	Puerto Rican Independence Party	87,272	5.42
Luis Lausell Hernández	Puerto Rican Socialist Party	5,224	0.32
Total		1,609,311	100.00
Valid votes		1,609,311	99.35
Invalid/blank votes		10,479	0.65
Total votes		1,619,790	100.00
Registered voters/turnout		1,835,160	88.26
Source: Nohlen

=== Resident Commissioner ===
Candidate	Party	Votes	%
Baltasar Corrada del Río	New Progressive Party	760,484	47.71
José Arsenio Torres	Popular Democratic Party	749,531	47.02
Marta Font de Calero	Puerto Rican Independence Party	83,911	5.26
Total		1,593,926	100.00
Registered voters/turnout		2,017,777	–
Source: Nohlen

=== House of Representatives ===
Party	Votes	%	Seats	+/–
New Progressive Party			25	–8
Popular Democratic Party			26	+8
Puerto Rican Independence Party			0	0
Puerto Rican Socialist Party			0	0
Total			51	0
Valid votes	1,611,665	99.50		
Invalid/blank votes	8,125	0.50		
Total votes	1,619,790	100.00		
Registered voters/turnout	2,071,777	78.18		
Source: Nohlen

=== Senate ===
Party	Seats	+/–
Popular Democratic Party	15	+2
New Progressive Party	12	–2
Puerto Rican Independence Party	0	0
Total	27	0
Source: Nohlen
