= Brenda López de Arrarás =

Member of the Puerto Rico House of Representatives

Chair of the Puerto Rico Popular Democratic Party Acting
- In office October 15, 2018 – December 2, 2018
- Preceded by: Héctor Ferrer
- Succeeded by: Aníbal José Torres

Member of the Puerto Rico House of Representatives from the at-large district
- In office January 2, 2009 – January 2, 2021

Personal details
- Born: Brenda López González; April 25, 1971 (age 55) Arecibo, Puerto Rico
- Party: Popular Democratic
- Other political affiliations: Democratic
- Education: University of Puerto Rico, Río Piedras (BA); Pontifical Catholic University of Puerto Rico School of Law (JD)

Brenda López de Arrarás (born April 25, 1971) is a Puerto Rican politician. She was a member of the Puerto Rico Chamber of Representatives from 2009 until 2021, and is affiliated to the Popular Democratic Party (PPD) and served as the party's vice president. She was the first woman, who reached that position, unanimously elected.

== Early years and studies ==
Brenda López was born on April 25, 1971, in Arecibo, but was raised in Utuado. Her father was a former member of the Puerto Rico House of Representatives for District 22. She completed her elementary and high school studies in Utuado. López then completed a bachelor's degree in Political Science from the University of Puerto Rico at Río Piedras graduating in 1993. After completing her bachelor's degree school, López de Arrarás entered the Pontifical Catholic University of Puerto Rico School of Law in Ponce, Puerto Rico and reached Juris Doctor degree in 1996.

== Political life ==
In 2007, López decided to run for office as a Representative. At the PPD primaries next year, she was the third candidate with most votes for Representative At-large. She was then elected at the 2008 general elections. She served as the party's Ranking Minority member in the Commissions of Education, Community Organizations, Agriculture, and others.

López was re-elected to a second term on the 2012 General Elections and a third term in the 2016 General Election. She served as the Chairwoman of the Commissions on Women Issues & Equality and Education, Arts & Culture from 2013 to 2016.

== Personal life ==
Brenda López is married to fellow politician José Enrique Arrarás. They have two children together named Enrique Antonio Arraras and Isabel Celste Arraras .

Party political offices
Preceded by Héctor Ferrer	Chair of the Puerto Rico Popular Democratic Party; Acting; 2018	Succeeded by Aníbal José Torres
