= Héctor Ferrer =

Puerto Rican politician and attorney (1970–2018)

Chair of the Puerto Rico Popular Democratic Party
- In office February 26, 2017 – October 15, 2018
- Preceded by: David Bernier
- Succeeded by: Brenda López de Arrarás (acting)
- In office November 10, 2008 – April 4, 2011
- Preceded by: Aníbal Acevedo Vilá
- Succeeded by: Alejandro García Padilla

Minority Leader of the Puerto Rico House of Representatives
- In office January 2, 2005 – March 15, 2012
- Preceded by: Aníbal Vega Borges
- Succeeded by: Luis Raúl Torres Cruz

Majority Whip of the Puerto Rico House of Representatives
- In office January 2, 2001 – January 1, 2005
- Preceded by: Iris Ruiz
- Succeeded by: María Ramos Rivera

Member of the Puerto Rico House of Representatives from the at-large district
- In office January 2, 2005 – March 15, 2012

Member of the Puerto Rico House of Representatives from the 29th district
- In office January 2, 2001 – January 1, 2005
- Preceded by: Luis Aramburu Díaz
- Succeeded by: Pedro Cintrón Rodríguez

Personal details
- Born: Héctor Jose Ferrer Ríos; March 27, 1970 San Juan, Puerto Rico
- Died: November 5, 2018 (aged 48) Hato Rey, Puerto Rico
- Party: Popular Democratic
- Other political affiliations: Democratic
- Children: 3, including Héctor
- Relatives: Eduardo Ferrer (brother)
- Education: University of North Carolina, Chapel Hill (BA); Interamerican University of Puerto Rico School of Law (JD)

Héctor Jose Ferrer Ríos (March 27, 1970 – November 5, 2018) was a Puerto Rican politician and attorney. He served as a legislator in the House of Representatives of Puerto Rico from 2001 to 2012 for three consecutive terms. He was the president of the Popular Democratic Party of Puerto Rico (PPD) from 2008 to 2011, and later from 2017 to October 2018.

== Early life and education ==
Ferrer was born on March 27, 1970, in San Juan, Puerto Rico. He was the second son of Eugenio Ferrer Colom and Maria Elisa Ríos Candelas . When he was 16 years old, Ferrer played at the Puerto Rico Amateur Baseball Federation. He played mostly as an infielder and was a member of several teams like Cupey, Vega Alta, San Lorenzo, Aibonito, Cidra, and Cayey. Ferrer finished his amateur baseball career with a batting average of .250, and 32 hits in 128 at-bats. Ferrer received a sports scholarship in baseball to study at the University of North Carolina. There, he received a Bachelor's degree with a major in Economics and Industrial Relations. He then received a Juris doctor from the School of Law of the Interamerican University of Puerto Rico. In March 1997, he was one of the top 10 grades at the bar exam.

After graduating, Ferrer worked as a private attorney.

== Political career ==
Ferrer was elected to the Puerto Rico House of Representatives at the 2000 general elections, to represent District 29. During his first term, he served as majority whip for the PPD, and presided the committees of Ethics, Federal and International Affairs, and Consumer Affairs.

Ferrer was reelected at the 2004 general elections, this time as a representative at-large. After his party lost the majority in both the Senate and the House, Ferrer took over as minority speaker.

In 2008, Ferrer was reelected for a third consecutive term, being the candidate with the most votes for the position among all candidates. Due to the defeat of the PPD in the race for governor and both the Senate and the House, Ferrer remained as minority speaker.

The defeat of the PPD led to the resignation of Aníbal Acevedo Vilá as president. Héctor Ferrer became president of the party on November 10, 2008, after a meeting of the board of directors which included veteran leaders like Héctor Luis Acevedo, Rafael Hernández Colón, and Miguel Hernández Agosto.

In 2011, he surrendered the presidency of the party to new gubernatorial candidate, Alejandro García Padilla. He had initially announced his intentions to run for Resident Commissioner of Puerto Rico, but then announced his decision to run for mayor of San Juan, against incumbent Jorge Santini at the 2012 general elections. However, after being arrested for alleged domestic abuse, he dropped his candidacy and moved away from politics. Five months later, the case against Ferrer was archived and no charges were presented against him.

During his time away from politics, Ferrer continued to work as an attorney. He also served as a panelist and commentator on the TV program Los Seis de la Tarde, transmitted via Univision Puerto Rico. In 2016, Ferrer returned to politics and ran for Resident Commissioner of Puerto Rico along Gubernatorial candidate David Bernier. He lost to Jenniffer González.

In February 2017, Ferrer was reelected by his party as President. In October 2018, he surrendered the presidency to Aníbal José Torres.

== Personal life ==
He was married to Sonia Marie Santiago with whom he had two children, Hector Enrique Ferrer Santiago and Marielisa Ferrer Santiago. After his divorce he had a brief marriage to Attorney Jacqueline Martinez. Once divorced, he had a relationship Elisa "Beba" Hernández for seven years, with whom he had a son, Eduardo José Ferrer Hernandez. Ferrer's brother, Eduardo, was elected to the House of Representatives in 2012.

Ferrer was an avid athlete and practiced a variety of sports, including baseball, jogging, cycling, and swimming, among others.

=== Domestic abuse scandal ===
In February 2012, Ferrer was detained after allegations of domestic abuse against his long-term partner, Elisa Hernández. Initially, Hernández was granted a protection order against Ferrer for one year. Shortly after, however, she asked for it to be rescinded. With conflicting versions surrounding the circumstances of the event and how it was handled, Ferrer resigned all of his political positions five days after the accusation. Several months later, the Office of the Special Independent Prosecutor's Panel (FEI in Spanish) determined there was insufficient evidence against Ferrer and opted not to press any charges against him. Several days after Ferrer's arrest, Hernández presented a sworn statement in which she claimed she was "coaxed by government figures to accuse" Ferrer.

== Health and death ==
In September 2015, Ferrer announced that he was diagnosed with cancer in the esophagus. He went under numerous treatments like chemotherapy and radiation. In 2016, Ferrer announced he was free of cancer.

In September 2018, Ferrer had a relapse for which he was hospitalized. He suffered some complications after a surgical procedure, but was released from the hospital after a week. Ferrer died almost two months later, on November 5, 2018, at the Auxilio Mutuo Hospital in Hato Rey after surgery. At the moment of Ferrer's death, his parents and youngest son were beside him. Carlos Delgado Altieri, Secretary General for the PPD and mayor of Isabela, Puerto Rico, confirmed the news and called it "something quick and unexpected". As a result, Governor Ricardo Rosselló declared five days of mourning in honor of Ferrer.

== Notes ==
House of Representatives of Puerto Rico
| Preceded by Aníbal Vega Borges | Minority Leader of the Puerto Rico House of Representatives; 2005–2012 | Succeeded by Luis Raúl Torres Cruz |
Party political offices
| Preceded by Aníbal Acevedo Vilá | Chair of the Puerto Rico Popular Democratic Party; 2008–2011 | Succeeded by Alejandro García Padilla |
| Preceded by David Bernier | Chair of the Puerto Rico Popular Democratic Party; 2017–2018 | Succeeded by Brenda López de Arrarás; Acting |
