= Carmen Yulín Cruz =

Puerto Rican politician (born 1963)

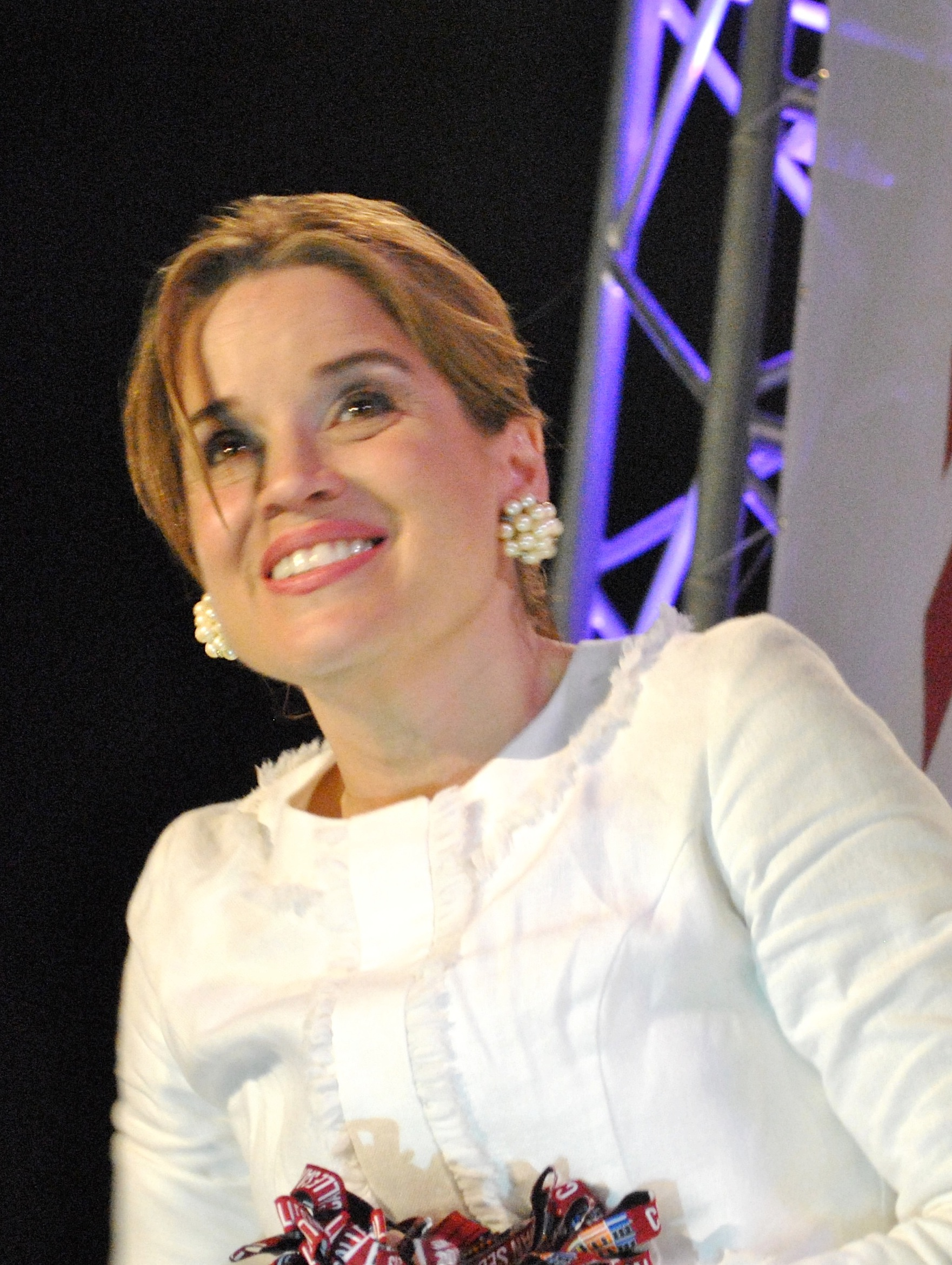
- Cruz in 2013

Mayor of San Juan
- In office January 14, 2013 – December 31, 2020
- Preceded by: Jorge Santini
- Succeeded by: Miguel Romero

Member of the Puerto Rico House of Representatives from the at-large district
- In office January 2, 2009 – January 1, 2013

Personal details
- Born: Carmen Yulín Cruz Soto; February 25, 1963 (age 63) San Juan, Puerto Rico
- Party: Popular Democratic (before 2023); Independent (2023–present)
- Other political affiliations: Democratic
- Children: 1
- Education: Boston University (BA); Carnegie Mellon University (MS)

Carmen Yulín Cruz Soto (born February 25, 1963) is a Puerto Rican politician who served as mayor of the city of San Juan, Puerto Rico from 2013 to 2020. From 2009 through 2013, Cruz served in the House of Representatives of Puerto Rico.

== Early years and studies ==
Carmen Yulín Cruz Soto was born on February 25, 1963, in San Juan to Carmen Irene Soto Molina from Lares and Pedro Cruz Vega. She has a brother named Pedro José Cruz. Cruz inherited the second part of her given name, Yulín, from her paternal grandmother, Lutgarda Vega. She graduated with honors from Julio Sellés Solá Elementary School and attended University of Puerto Rico Secondary School where she was president of the student council as well as a representative at a presidential youth summit.

Cruz earned her Bachelor of Arts in political science from Boston University on May 30, 1984, graduating Cum Laude. She completed a Master of Science in Public Management and Policy at the Heinz College at Carnegie Mellon University on May 12, 1986, where she became the first student to receive the Spirit Award (now called the Barbara Jenkins Award), given to a graduating student for service and contributions to the college and region.

== Political career ==
=== First years in politics ===
In 1992, Cruz returned to Puerto Rico and became an adviser to San Juan mayor Sila María Calderón. She ran unsuccessfully for District 1 representative in the 2000 general elections.

=== 2009–13: Representative ===
Eight years later, Cruz ran again for the Puerto Rico House of Representatives, this time for an islandwide at-large seat, at the 2008 elections, after nomination in the PDP primaries. After being elected, Cruz became the PDP's Ranking Member on the Women Affairs Committee. Due to the high population of Dominican immigrants in the subdivisions of San Juan, most notably in Santurce, Cruz became involved with the Dominican American National Roundtable as a supporter.

Upon launching her re-election campaign in 2011, she became the first candidate from her party to collect the required endorsements, presenting more than the 4,000 total within the time frame required to complete only 2,000. At the Popular Democratic Party primaries in 2012, Cruz led all of the candidates to the House of Representatives in votes, followed by fellow soberanista (sovereigntist) Luis Vega Ramos. On the original result, she had 217,162 votes counted, which surpassed the incumbent House of Representatives President Jennifer González, with a reported 216,087 in the NPP primaries.

=== 2012: Candidate for San Juan's mayorship ===
Cruz Soto began hinting at her interest in running for the mayorship of her native city of San Juan in early 2011, but decided to step down when opposed by the conservadores, led by Popular Democratic Party president Alejandro García Padilla, who named the second in-command of that wing, representative Héctor Ferrer, to occupy the position. However, her name resurfaced following the resignation of Ferrer, who was forced to abandon the race due to a domestic abuse incident which led to a formal investigation.

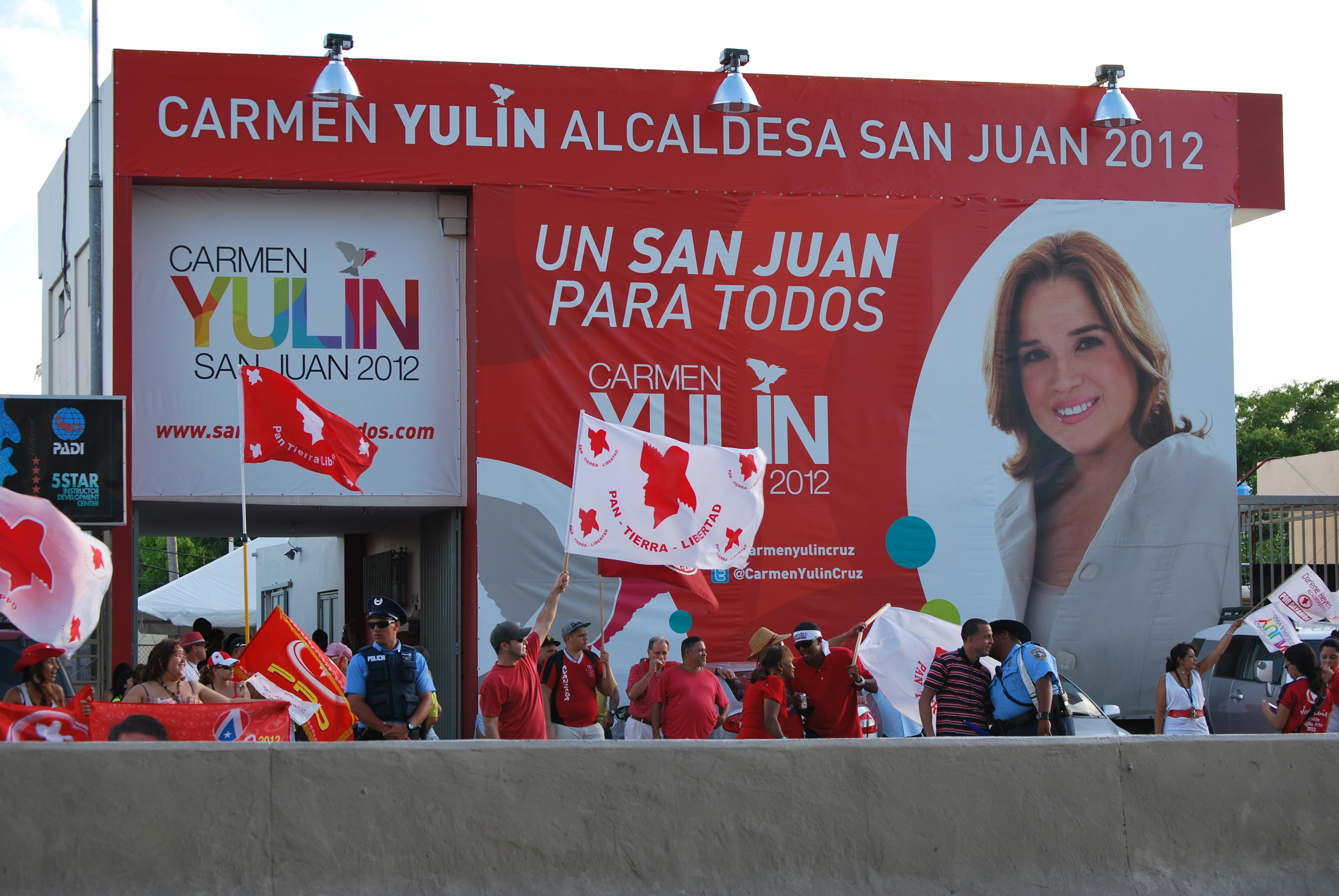
Cruz' campaign headquarters two days before the 2012 elections

Although Cruz initially denied that she was running for mayor of San Juan, on March 26, 2012, she announced her decision to accept the party's petition and challenge incumbent mayor Jorge Santini. In the media fallout that followed, Cruz was favored over Santini throughout the social networks, Facebook and Twitter, as reported by a specialist in media marketing. Likewise, she was favored in unofficial polls held by mainstream publications El Nuevo Día (64% of 1,940 votes) and Primera Hora (120,041 vs. 34,588 or 77.3%).

On March 28, 2012, Cruz was promoted to the position of PDP Minority Whip in the House of Representatives. Two days later, the PDP's San Juan Municipal Committee ratified her as their new president. In contrast to the majority of the candidates for any mayorship, she has expressed not believing in the "perpetuation of office", noting that eight years should be enough to fulfill a development plan, if executed correctly. On May 4, 2012, she attended a Service Employees International Union conference and held a meeting with Jim Messina, campaign director for President Barack Obama, to discuss health care and education funds, citing that "it is important to take stances in US politics, since half of all Puerto Ricans live there". During this visit, Cruz also negotiated the establishment of a Chicago-San Juan alliance with the Puerto Rican community there, led by congressman Luis Gutierrez. Carmen Yulín has also expressed full support for LGBT and women's rights.

=== 2013–2020: Mayor of San Juan ===
Cruz was elected as the next mayor of San Juan on November 6, 2012, defeating three term-incumbent Mayor Jorge Santini in the city's 2012 mayoral election. She became the third woman to hold San Juan's mayoral office, after Felisa Rincón de Gautier and Sila Calderón.

Cruz's administration continued her predecessor Jorge Santini's plans for the revitalization of the Río Piedras district. The first phase of this plan consisted of the restoration of historic buildings in the subdivision. An economic plan spearheaded by José Rivera-Santana promoted incentives for housing and establishment of new businesses in Río Piedras, in an attempt to salvage the economic importance that the district once had. This was complemented with direct communication and collaboration with the local community and several institutions, including the University of Puerto Rico.

She won reelection in the city's 2016 mayoral election, then did not run for mayor in the 2020 mayoral elections.

==== Hurricane Maria ====
In September 2017, in the aftermath of Hurricane Maria, Cruz made frequent appearances on national and international television, criticizing federal aid efforts for not getting the aid shipments into the hands of the people who needed them, accusing President Donald Trump and his administration of "killing us with inefficiency", and giving pleas for help in numerous media interviews.

At a September 29 press conference Cruz said:

"We are dying here and I cannot fathom the thought that the greatest nation in the world cannot figure out logistics for a small island of 100 miles by 35 miles long... People are drinking off a creek. So I am done being polite. I am done being politically correct. I am mad as hell... So I am asking the members of the press, to send a mayday call all over the world. We are dying here... And if it doesn't stop, and if we don't get the food and the water into people's hands, what we are going to see is something close to a genocide".

Speaking on Fox News, Federal Emergency Management Agency (FEMA) director Brock Long responded to Cruz's remarks saying that unity of command was the main thing needed for the relief effort to be successful, and suggested the mayor needed to go to the joint field office and "get plugged in". Responding to her statements, President Trump tweeted, "The mayor of San Juan, who was very complimentary only a few days ago, has now been told by Democrats that you must be nasty to Trump. Such poor leadership ability by the mayor of San Juan and others in Puerto Rico who are not able to get their workers to help."

Many legislators responded to Cruz's comments and the Trump tweets. Speaking on CNN, Rep. Al Green said that he saw undertones of racism in the President's remarks. "If they were all Anglos, I don't believe the President would have the attitude that he has, because you don't hear that kind of dog whistle, of people not wanting to pull themselves up by their bootstraps, when the people are Anglos. That's something reserved for people of color." In tweets Sen. Kirsten Gillibrand called Trump's remarks "offensive" and Sen. Ed Markey said that the President needed to apologize to the people of Puerto Rico, saying, ""The definition of 'poor leadership' is sitting at your golf club while millions of US citizens beg for your help, @realDonaldTrump," Sen. Elizabeth Warren said Puerto Rico was in "crisis" and Trump should "stop playing politics with their lives." Rep. Don Beyer writing the President "focused on aid efforts in TX & FL but ignored Puerto Rico. Now you attack San Juan's mayor for saying 'people are dying.' THEY ARE DYING."

=== 2020 gubernatorial campaign ===
In March 2019, Cruz announced her candidacy for governor in the Popular Democratic Party (PDP) primaries for the 2020 elections. In a three-way race she failed to secure the PDP nomination, finishing third behind Isabela mayor Carlos Delgado Altieri and senator Eduardo Bhatia.

== Other activities ==
On February 21, 2019, Cruz announced that she was joining Senator Bernie Sanders' Presidential campaign as one of its four national co-chairs.

2021 Mount Holyoke College - Harriet L. Weissman and Paul M. Weissman Distinguished Fellow in Leadership

== Awards ==
Cruz has received numerous recognitions and awards, including the Martin Luther King Centre Justice, Peace and Freedom Award and Humanitarian Leadership Award in 2018, the Antonio Villaraigosa Leadership Award in 2018, the AIDS Healthcare Foundation Humanitarian Award 2017, and the Puerto Rico Arts Alliance Felisa Rincón Legacy Public Service Award. She was also nominated by People en Español as one of the 50 most Powerful Women in 2017, and Time magazine chose her as candidate for Person of the Year recognition in 2017. In 2018, she was on the Time list of the 100 most Influential People in the World for her leadership in the aftermath of Hurricane Maria. In 2018, Cruz received the prestigious Ridenhour Truth-Telling Award, as well as Casa de Esperanza's Award for Inspirational leadership, the Hank Aaron Champion of Justice Award, and the Southern Christian Leadership Conference's Award for Economic Justice. In 2018, she was named to Essence magazine's Woke 100 Women list.

== Personal life ==
Cruz married psychologist and University of Sacred Heart professor Alfredo Carrasquillo on September 25, 2010, three months after their relationship started. They divorced a year later, but remarried in 2013 and divorced again in 2017. Cruz has a daughter, Marina Yulín Paul Cruz, from a previous marriage.

== See also ==
- List of Puerto Ricans
- History of women in Puerto Rico

Political offices
Preceded by Jorge Santini	Mayor of San Juan; 2013–2020	Succeeded by Miguel Romero
