= 2008 San Juan, Puerto Rico, mayoral election =

- November 4, 2008
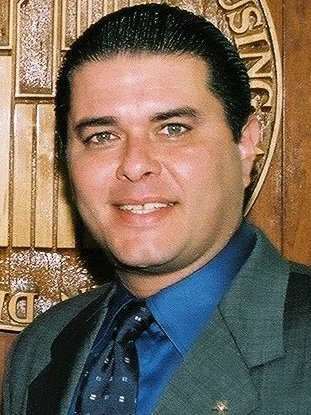

Nominee	Jorge Santini	Ferdinand Pérez Román
Party	New Progressive	Popular Democratic
Popular vote	96,444	84,109
Percentage	51.96%	45.31%
Mayor before election
Jorge Santini
New Progressive
Elected mayor
Jorge Santini
New Progressive

San Juan, Puerto Rico, held an election for mayor on November 4, 2008. Among other elections, it was held concurrently with the 2008 Puerto Rico gubernatorial election. It saw the re-election incumbent mayor Jorge Santini, a member of the New Progressive Party, to a third consecutive term.

== Results ==
San Juan mayoral election
Party	Candidate	Votes	%
New Progressive	Jorge A. Santini Padilla (incumbent)	96,444	51.96
Popular Democratic	Ferdinand Pérez Román	84,109	45.31
Independence	Luis Roberto Piñero González	5,066	2.73
Total votes		185,619	100

== See also ==
- 2008 Puerto Rican general election
