= Carlos López Rivera =

Puerto Rican politician (1958–2025)

Mayor of Dorado
- In office August 3, 1987 – October 17, 2025 (died in office)
- Preceded by: Alfonso López Chaar
- Succeeded by: Aníbal José Torres

Personal details
- Born: September 14, 1958 Dorado, Puerto Rico
- Died: October 17, 2025 (aged 67) Dorado, Puerto Rico
- Party: Popular Democratic Party (PPD)
- Other political affiliations: Democratic
- Spouse: Edith Hunt
- Education: University of Puerto Rico at Bayamón (BBA)
- Occupation: Politician

Carlos Alberto López Rivera (September 14, 1958 – October 17, 2025) was a Puerto Rican politician who was the mayor of Dorado. López was affiliated with the Popular Democratic Party (PPD) and served as mayor from 1987 until his death from liver cancer in 2025. López was first sworn in as mayor of Dorado on August 3, 1987 succeeding Alfonso López Chaar. He was then officially elected at the 1988 general elections. He was reelected in 1992, 1996, 2000, 2004, 2008, 2012, 2016, 2020, and 2024.

== Early life and education ==
López Rivera was born in Dorado on September 14, 1958, to Pedro López Maldonado and Ana Rivera. They were an employee of the Autoridad de Tierras and a public teacher respectively. He was one of four siblings and studied locally at the Jacinto López Martínez elementary. Afterwards he moved to Ricardo Arroyo Karacuente middle school. During this time he focused on practicing sports. He graduated from the José S. Alegría High School and then completed a Bachelor's degree in Business Management, with a major in Accounting and Finances, from the University of Puerto Rico at Bayamón. Between 1976-1978, López worked a part-time shift as payment official for the Autoridad de Tierras. Two years later, he began working as accountant aide for the same entity. In 1979, López worked as accountant for the administrative office of the VIII Pan American Games. As a baseball player, López won the Rookie of the Year and RBI title in the COLICEBA. In 1982, he began working in the accountancy department of the municipality of Dorado, becoming Municipal Accountant. That same year, he won the MVP recognition with his team of Florida in the AA Superior amateur baseball league.

== Political career ==
1983, López worked as adjutant for Dorado's Finances Director. The following year he worked as coordinator for the PPD Youth for the Arecibo region and was elected at-large member of the PPD Municipal Committee. In 1985, he became adjutant to the major. During this time, he was placed in charge of the municipality's Cultural Center. In 1987, López became the vice president and later president of the PPD Municipal Committee. That same year he received a recognition for the Puerto Rican Culture Institute. When López Chaar vacated the mayorship to become Secretary of State, he was ascended to mayor. He sanctioned the building of two terminals and a number of road and side way construction projects. His administration also built several monuments and approached a public-private collaboration to build the Dorado del Mar Hotel. López also managed the municipality's cultural projects (roundalla, municipal band) and workshops (dramatic arts, woodworking, pastry baking, floristry and painting) and the sports programs (chess and aerobics). Between 1988-1990, he was treasurer for the Gerícola Committee's Bayamón region. In 1989, López served as the director of the Arecibo region for the Mayor's Association. In 1990, he was selected as Distinguished Youth in the field of municipal administration by the Junior Chamber of Río Piedras. López won his re-election at the 1992 General Elections against Antonio about Moreno of the PNP.

== Personal life ==
López was married Estilia Román Dávila and had two sons.

== Death ==
Rivera died from liver cancer on October 17, 2025, at the age of 67. He was buried at Campo Santo Dorado Municipal Cemetery.

== Sources ==
- Canino Salgado, Marcelino J. (1993). Dorado, Puerto Rico: Historia, Cultura, Biografias y Lecturas. AMD.
