= 2012 San Juan, Puerto Rico, mayoral election =

- November 6, 2012
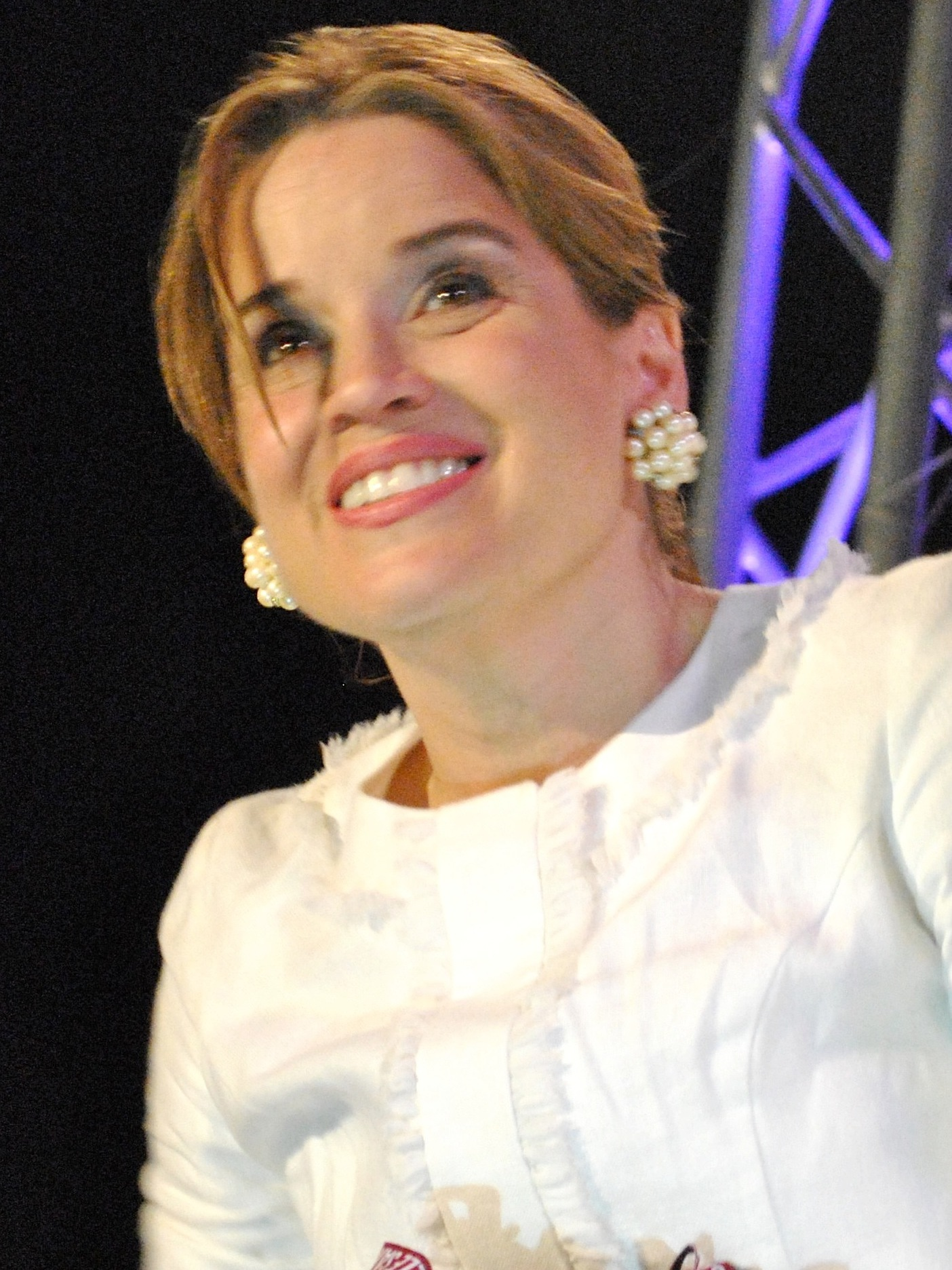

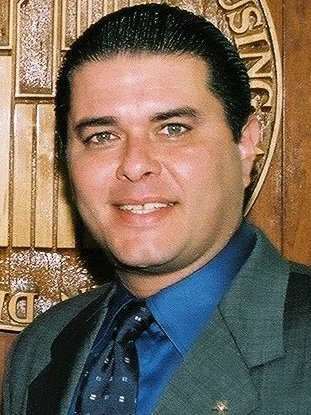
Nominee	Carmen Yulín Cruz	Jorge Santini
Party	Popular Democratic	New Progressive
Popular vote	87,313	81,005
Percentage	50.54%	46.89%
Mayor before election
Jorge Santini
New Progressive
Elected mayor
Carmen Yulín Cruz
Popular Democratic

San Juan, Puerto Rico, held an election for mayor on November 6, 2012. Among other elections, it was held concurrently with the 2012 Puerto Rico gubernatorial election. It saw the election of Popular Democracy Party nominee Carmen Yulín Cruz, who unseated incumbent New Progressive Party mayor Jorge Santini.

== Nominees ==
- Carmen Yulín Cruz (Popular Democracy Party), member of the Puerto Rico House of Representatives since 2009
- Jorge Santini Padilla (New Progressive Party), incumbent mayor since 2001
- Luis Roberto Piñero (Puerto Rican Independence Party)
- Tito Román Rivera (Working People's Party)

== Results ==
San Juan mayoral election
Party	Candidate	Votes	%
Popular Democratic	Carmen Yulín Cruz	87,313	50.54
New Progressive	Jorge Santini Padilla (incumbent)	81,005	46.89
Independence	Luis Roberto Piñero	2,633	1.52
Working People's Party	José "Tito" Román Rivera	900	0.52
Write-In	Others	915	0.53
Total votes		172,766	100

== See also ==
- 2012 Puerto Rican general election
