= 2016 San Juan, Puerto Rico, mayoral election =

- November 8, 2016
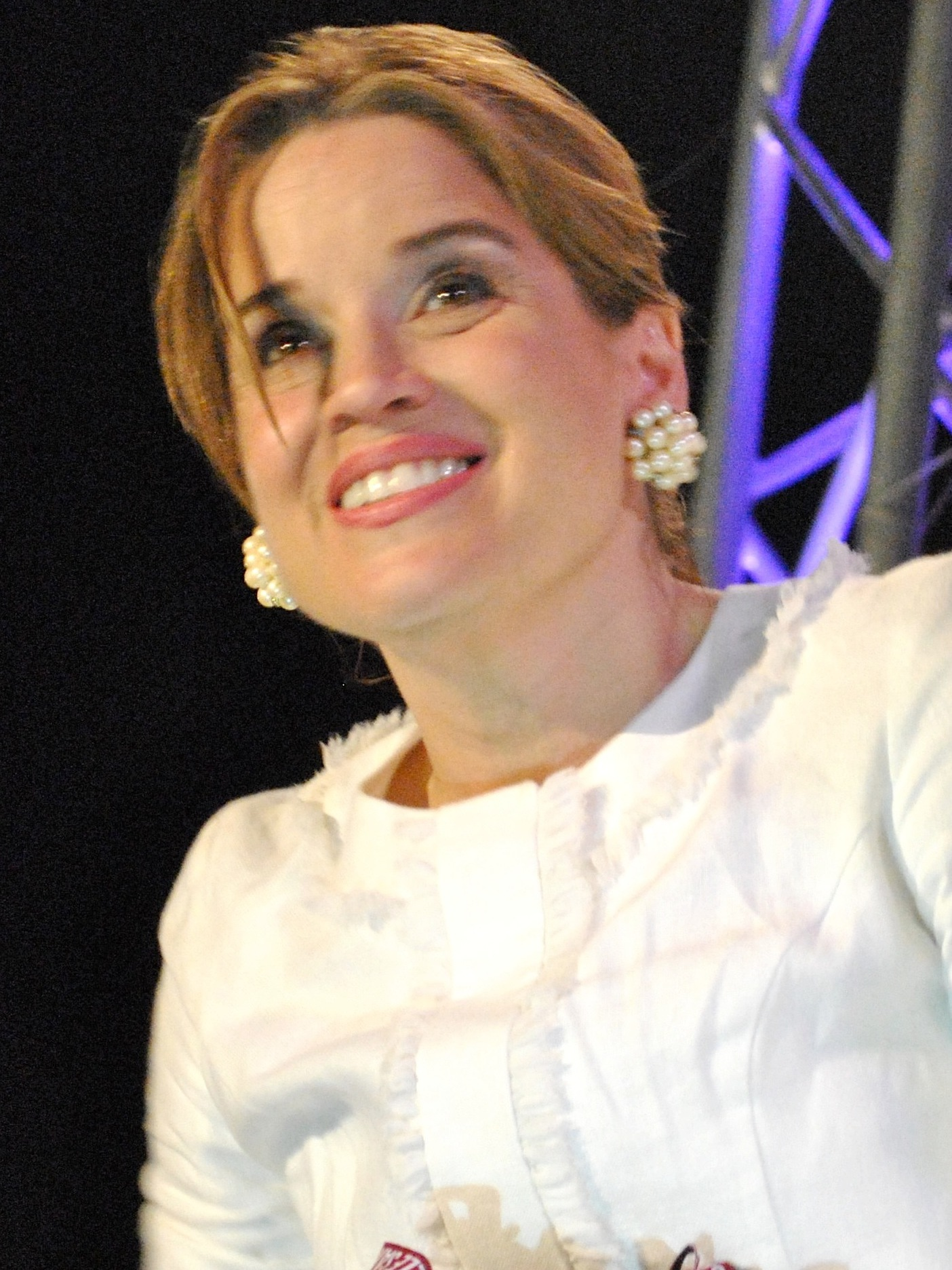

Nominee	Carmen Yulín Cruz	Leo Díaz Urbina
Party	Popular Democratic	New Progressive
Popular vote	78,509	65,345
Percentage	52.56%	43.75%
Mayor before election
Carmen Yulín Cruz
Popular Democratic
Elected mayor
Carmen Yulín Cruz
Popular Democratic

San Juan, Puerto Rico, held an election for mayor on November 8, 2016. Among other elections, it was held concurrently with the 2016 Puerto Rico gubernatorial election. It saw the re-election of Carmen Yulín Cruz, a member of the Popular Democratic Party.

== Nominees ==
- Antonio Carmona Báez (Working People's Party)
- Adrián González Costa (Puerto Rican Independence Party)
- Carmen Yulín Cruz (Popular Democracy Party), incumbent mayor since 2013
- Leo Díaz Urbina (New Progressive Party), former member of the Puerto Rico House of Representatives

== Results ==
San Juan mayoral election
Party	Candidate	Votes	%
Popular Democratic	Carmen Yulín Cruz Soto (incumbent)	78,509	52.56
New Progressive	Leo Díaz Urbina	65,345	43.75
Independence	Adrián González Costa	4,202	2.81
Working People's Party	Antonio Carmona Báez	1,303	0.87
Total votes		149,359	100

== See also ==
- 2016 Puerto Rican general election
