= Morales Carrión Diplomatic and Foreign Relations School =

School of international relations in Puerto Rico

The Dr. Arturo Morales Carrión Diplomatic and Foreign Relations School (Spanish: Escuela Diplomática y de Relaciones Exteriores Dr. Arturo Morales Carrión) is the only school of international relations in Puerto Rico. The school was created by Secretary of State of Puerto Rico, David Bernier, on November 19, 2013, in order to advance the academia of diplomacy and international relations on the island which is non-existent. The school honors the name of Arturo Morales Carrión, is ascribed to the Department of State of Puerto Rico, and does not confer any degrees as it is still in development.
