= List of presidents of the Popular Democratic Party of Puerto Rico =

This is a list of people who have been president of the Puerto Rico Popular Democratic Party.

#	Portrait	Name	Term start	Term end	Other posts
1		Luis Muñoz Marín	11 May 1938	1960	Governor
2	Rafael Hernández Colón	Rafael Hernández Colón	December 1969	July 1978	Secretary of Justice; Member of the Puerto Rico Senate
3	Miguel Hernández Agosto	Miguel Hernández Agosto	July 1978	1984	Secretary of Agriculture; Member of the Puerto Rico Senate
4	Rafael Hernández Colón	Rafael Hernández Colón	1984	January 1992	Governor
5		Victoria Muñoz Mendoza	January 1992	5 September 1994	Member of the Puerto Rico Senate
6	Héctor Luis Acevedo	Héctor Luis Acevedo	5 September 1994	20 July 1997	Mayor of San Juan; Secretary of State
7	Aníbal Acevedo Vilá	Aníbal Acevedo Vilá	20 July 1997	3 June 1999	Member of the Puerto Rico House of Representatives; Resident commissioner of Puerto Rico; Governor
8	Sila María Calderón	Sila María Calderón	3 June 1999	28 September 2003	Secretary of State; Mayor of San Juan; Governor
9	Aníbal Acevedo Vilá	Aníbal Acevedo Vilá	28 September 2003	4 November 2008	Member of the Puerto Rico House of Representatives; Resident commissioner of Puerto Rico; Governor
10		Héctor Ferrer Ríos	4 November 2008	11 August 2011	Member of the Puerto Rico House of Representatives
11	Alejandro García Padilla	Alejandro García Padilla	11 August 2011	24 July 2016	Secretary of Consumer Affairs of Puerto Rico; Governor
12	David Bernier	David Bernier	24 July 2016	3 January 2017	Secretary of State
13		Héctor Ferrer Ríos	3 January 2017	10 December 2018	Member of the Puerto Rico House of Representatives
14		Aníbal José Torres	10 December 2018	20 August 2020	Majority Leader of the Puerto Rico Senate; Chief of Staff
15		Carlos Delgado Altieri	20 August 2020	22 February 2021	Mayor of Isabela
16		José Luis Dalmau	23 February 2021	14 June 2023	President of the Puerto Rico Senate
17		Jesús Manuel Ortiz	14 June 2023	2 February 2025	Member of the Puerto Rico House of Representatives
18		Pablo Hernández Rivera	2 February 2025	Present	Resident commissioner of Puerto Rico
