= List of schools of international relations in the United States =

The United States has a long history offering studies in international relations and public policy, with many heads of state and heads of government graduating from American schools. Prominent alumni of school of international relations in the U.S. include Bill Clinton, former President of the United States; Gloria Macapagal Arroyo, former President of the Philippines; Abdullah II ibn al-Hussein, the King of Jordan; Felipe VI, the King of Spain (Georgetown / SFS); Felipe Calderón; former President of Mexico; Juan Manuel Santos, former President of Colombia; Lee Hsien Loong, former Prime Minister of Singapore (Harvard / HKS); Kyriakos Mitsotakis, Prime Minister of Greece (Stanford / FSI); Pedro Pablo Kuczynski, former President of Peru (Princeton / SPIA), and Geir H. Haarde, former Prime Minister of Iceland (Johns Hopkins / SAIS). Today, 17 out of the world's top 20 schools of international relations are based in the United States.

== Schools ==
| Rank | Location | University | Name | Focus |
|---|---|---|---|---|
| N/A | Alabama | Samford University | | |
| N/A | Alabama | Spring Hill College | | |
| N/A | Alabama | Troy University | | |
| N/A | Arizona | Embry-Riddle Aeronautical University | College of Security and Intelligence | |
| N/A | Arizona | Benedictine University Mesa | Liberal arts valued based Catholic University | |
| N/A | Arizona | Northern Arizona University | | |
| N/A | Arizona | Prescott College | | |
| N/A | Arkansas | Hendrix College | | |
| N/A | Arkansas | University of Arkansas | | |
| N/A | Arkansas | University of Arkansas at Little Rock | | |
| N/A | California | Alliant International University | Graduate School of International Relations | international relations |
| N/A | California | California State University, Fresno | Department of Political Science | international relations |
| N/A | California | Chapman University | | international studies |
| N/A | California | Claremont Graduate University | | international studies |
| 16 | California | University of California, Berkeley | Goldman School of Public Policy | public policy |
| 14 | California | University of California, San Diego | School of Global Policy and Strategy | international relations |
| N/A | California | University of San Diego | | |
| N/A | California | University of San Francisco | | international studies |
| N/A | California | University of Southern California | School of International Relations | international relations |
| N/A | California | University of the Pacific | School of International Studies | international studies |
| N/A | California | San Francisco State University | Graduate School of International Relations | international relations |
| 11 | California | Stanford University | Ford Dorsey Program in International Policy Studies | international policy |
| 10 | Colorado | University of Denver | Josef Korbel School of International Studies | international studies |
| N/A | Colorado | University of Colorado at Boulder | | |
| N/A | Connecticut | University of Bridgeport | College of Public and International Affairs | public and international affairs |
| 12 | Connecticut | Yale University | Jackson Institute for Global Affairs | international relations |
| N/A | Florida | Florida International University | School of International and Public Affairs | international relations |
| N/A | Florida | Florida State University | | |
| N/A | Florida | Schiller International University | | |
| N/A | Georgia | University of Georgia | School of Public and International Affairs | international relations |
| N/A | Georgia | Georgia Institute of Technology | Sam Nunn School of International Affairs | international relations |
| 9 | Illinois | University of Chicago | Committee on International Relations | international relations |
| N/A | Indiana | Indiana University | School of Global and International Studies | international relations and studies |
| N/A | Indiana | University of Indianapolis | College of Graduate Arts and Sciences | international relations |
| N/A | Indiana | University of Notre Dame | Keough School of Global Affairs | global affairs |
| N/A | Iowa | Drake University | | |
| N/A | Kentucky | University of Kentucky | Patterson School of Diplomacy and International Commerce | diplomacy |
| N/A | Massachusetts | Boston University | Pardee School of Global Studies | international relations |
| 3 | Massachusetts | Harvard University | Harvard Kennedy School | government |
| 15 | Massachusetts | Massachusetts Institute of Technology | MIT Center for International Studies | international studies |
| 5 | Massachusetts | Tufts University | Fletcher School of Law and Diplomacy | international law |
| N/A | Michigan | Grand Valley State University | | international relations |
| 18 | Michigan | University of Michigan | Gerald R. Ford School of Public Policy | public policy |
| N/A | Mississippi | University of Mississippi | Croft Institute for International Studies | international studies |
| N/A | Missouri | Webster University | | |
| N/A | Oklahoma | Oklahoma State University | OSU School of International Studies | international studies |
| N/A | Oklahoma | University of Oklahoma | College of International Studies | international studies |
| 4 | New Jersey | Princeton University | Woodrow Wilson School of Public and International Affairs | international relations |
| N/A | New Jersey | Seton Hall University | School of Diplomacy and International Relations | international relations |
| 6 | New York | Columbia University | School of International and Public Affairs | international relations |
| 17 | New York | New York University | Graduate School of Arts and Science | |
| N/A | New York | St. John's University | School of Liberal Arts and Sciences | international relations |
| 13 | New York | Syracuse University | Maxwell School of Citizenship and Public Affairs | public affairs |
| N/A | New York | The New School | Graduate Program in International Affairs | international relations |
| N/A | Pennsylvania | Carnegie Mellon University | Institute for Strategy & Technology | international relations |
| N/A | Pennsylvania | Pennsylvania State University | School of International Affairs | international relations |
| N/A | Pennsylvania | University of Pittsburgh | Graduate School of Public and International Affairs | international relations |
| N/A | Puerto Rico | N/A (Note: The school is ascribed to the Department of State of Puerto Rico as the school is still in development.) | Morales Carrión Diplomatic and Foreign Relations School | diplomacy |
| N/A | Rhode Island | Brown University | Watson Institute for International Studies | international studies |
| N/A | Texas | Texas A&M University | Bush School of Government and Public Service | government |
| N/A | Texas | University of Texas | Lyndon B. Johnson School of Public Affairs | public affairs |
| N/A | Utah | University of Utah | | international relations |
| N/A | Vermont | Middlebury College | Rohatyn Center for Global Affairs | international relations |
| N/A | Virginia | College of William & Mary | Institute for the Theory and Practice of International Relations | international relations |
| N/A | Virginia | George Mason University | Schar School of Policy and Government | public policy school international relations |
| N/A | Washington | University of Washington | Henry M. Jackson School of International Studies | international studies |
| 8 | Washington, DC | American University | School of International Service | international relations |
| 7 | Washington, DC | George Washington University | Elliott School of International Affairs | international relations |
| 1 | Washington, DC | Georgetown University | Edmund A. Walsh School of Foreign Service | international relations |
| 2 | Washington, DC | Johns Hopkins University | Paul H. Nitze School of Advanced International Studies | international relations |
| N/A | Washington, DC | The Institute of World Politics | | global politics |

== See also ==
- Association of Professional Schools of International Affairs
- Inside the Ivory Tower
- List of schools of international relations
