= Jesús Manuel Ortiz =

Puerto Rican politician (born 1978)

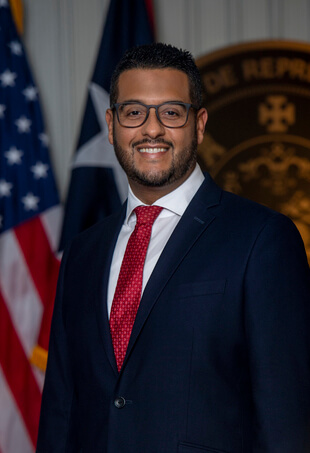

Chair of the Puerto Rico Popular Democratic Party
- In office May 17, 2023 – February 2, 2025
- Preceded by: José Luis Dalmau
- Succeeded by: Pablo Hernández Rivera

Member of the House of Representatives of Puerto Rico from the at-large district
- In office January 2, 2017 – January 2, 2025

Personal details
- Born: April 23, 1978 (age 46); Vega Alta, Puerto Rico
- Political party: Popular Democratic
- Education: Interamerican University of Puerto Rico (BA); Interamerican University of Puerto Rico School of Law (JD)

Jesús Manuel Ortiz González (born April 23, 1978) is a Puerto Rican politician serving as a member at-large of the House of Representatives of Puerto Rico since 2017. He has served as the president of the Popular Democratic Party since 2023.

== Life ==
Ortiz was born on April 23, 1978. He graduated from Escuela Superior Maestro Ladí in Vega Alta. In 2002, he earned a bachelor's degree, magna cum laude, in communications from the Interamerican University of Puerto Rico.

Ortiz was a journalist, reporter, and editor at WKAQ (AM). He later worked as a producer for Radio Reloj Investiga, Ojeda Sin Límite, and A Palo Limpio. In 2005, he became a press secretary in the Puerto Rico Department of Consumer Affairs. He directed the public communication strategy for secretaries Alejandro García Padilla and Víctor Suárez Meléndez. From 2009 to 2012, Ortiz served as the communications advisor for senator García Padilla and later as campaign press secretary during the 2012 Puerto Rican general election. From 2013 to 2016, he was press secretary to governor García Padilla and concurrently served as the secretary of public affairs from 2015 to 2016. He graduated with a J.D. the Interamerican University of Puerto Rico School of Law in 2016.

A member of the Popular Democratic Party, Ortiz was elected during the 2016 Puerto Rican general election as a member at-large of the House of Representatives of Puerto Rico. In May 2023, he was elected as president of the Popular Democratic Party, succeeding José Luis Dalmau. In November 2023, Ortiz announced his candidacy in the 2024 gubernatorial election.

Party political offices
Preceded by José Luis Dalmau	Chair of the Puerto Rico Popular Democratic Party; 2023–2025	Succeeded by Pablo Hernández Rivera
Preceded by Carlos Delgado Altieri	Popular Democratic nominee for Governor of Puerto Rico; 2024	Most recent
