= 2004 San Juan, Puerto Rico, mayoral election =

- November 2, 2004
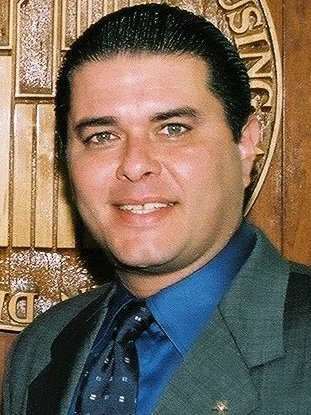
Nominee	Jorge Santini
Party	New Progressive
Popular vote	97,121
Percentage	100%
Mayor before election
Jorge Santini
New Progressive
Elected mayor
Jorge Santini
New Progressive

San Juan, Puerto Rico, held an election for mayor on November 2, 2004. It was held as part of the 2004 Puerto Rican general election. It saw the re-election incumbent mayor Jorge Santini, a member of the New Progressive Party. Santini ran unchallenged.

== Results ==
San Juan mayoral election
Party	Candidate	Votes	%
New Progressive	Jorge A. Santini Padilla (incumbent)	97,121	100
Total votes		97,121	100
