= Pablo Hernández Rivera =

Puerto Rican politician (born 1991)

Pablo Hernández
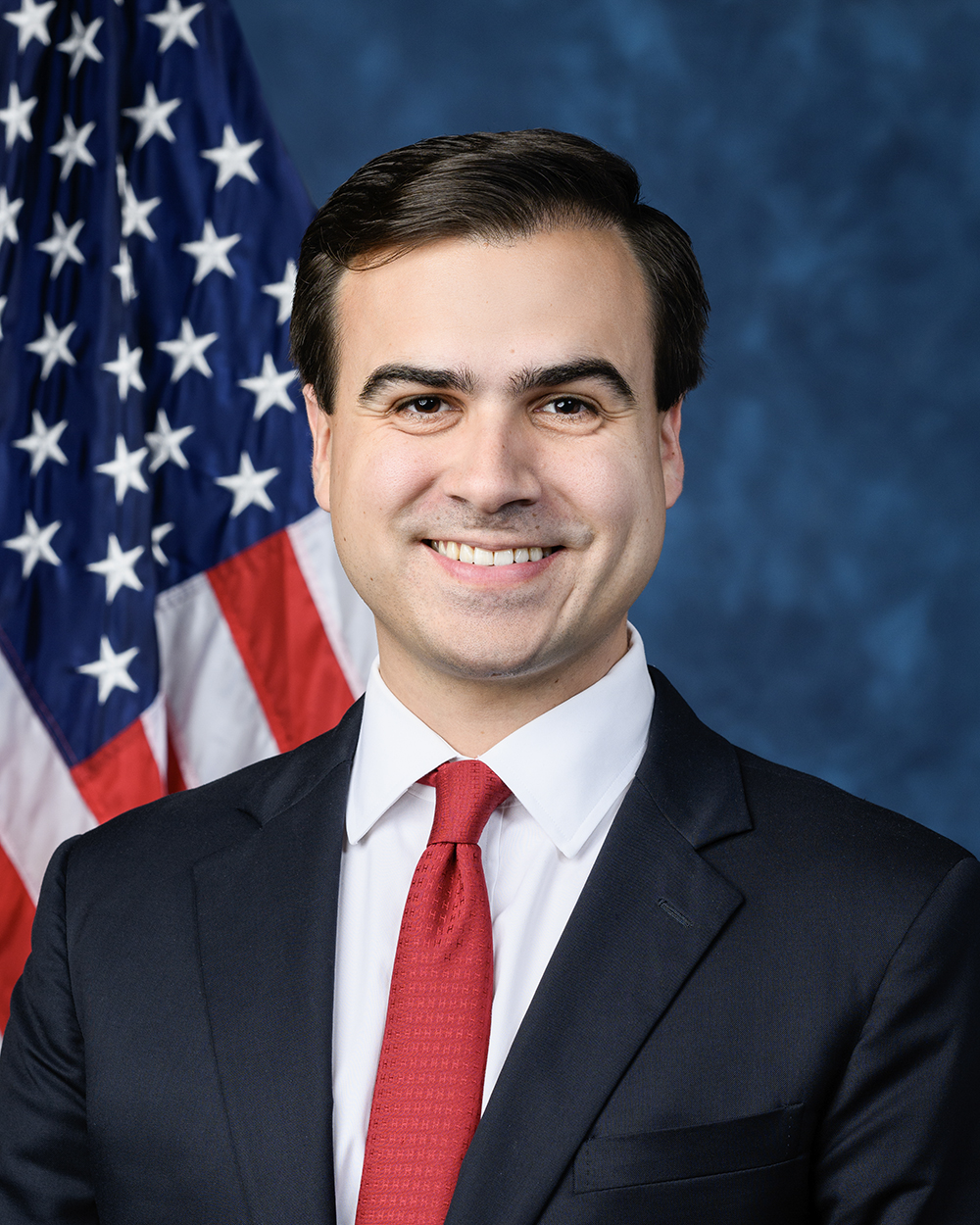
- Official portrait, 2024

21st Resident Commissioner of Puerto Rico
- Incumbent
- Assumed office January 3, 2025
- Preceded by: Jenniffer González Colón

Chair of the Puerto Rico Popular Democratic Party
- Incumbent
- Assumed office February 2, 2025
- Preceded by: Jesús Manuel Ortiz

Personal details
- Born: Pablo José Hernández Rivera; May 11, 1991 (age 35) San Juan, Puerto Rico
- Party: Popular Democratic
- Other political affiliations: Democratic
- Relatives: Rafael Hernández Colón (grandfather); Lila Mayoral Wirshing (grandmother); Juan Eugenio Hernández; Mayoral (uncle)
- Education: Harvard University (BA); Stanford University (JD)
- Website: House website Campaign website
- Hernández's voice Hernández on a contract for temporary power generation in Puerto Rico; Recorded September 2, 2026

Pablo José Hernández Rivera (born May 11, 1991) is a Puerto Rican politician who is the resident commissioner of Puerto Rico.

== Early life and education ==
Pablo José Hernández Rivera is the grandson of the former governor Rafael Hernández Colón and his wife Lila Mayoral Wirshing. He graduated from Academia del Perpetuo Socorro, earned a bachelor's degree from Harvard College, and obtained a Juris Doctor from Stanford Law School.

== Career ==
Hernández Rivera was formerly assistant secretary of federal and international affairs for the Popular Democratic Party (PPD). On the federal level, Hernández Rivera caucuses with the Democratic Party.

In November 2024, in an opinion piece in The Hill, he announced that for the first time since 2000, Puerto Rican voters had chosen an opponent of Puerto Rican statehood as their delegate to the United States House of Representatives.

In January 2025, Hernández Rivera announced his candidacy for the presidency of the PPD following the resignation of Jesús Manuel Ortiz.

On February 2, 2025, he took office as president of the party, and announced his intention to refound the group, defining it as "realistic, autonomist, and centrist".

He has advocated for redefining the country's status as a "commonwealth" for greater self-governance, federal parity, and a more clear division of powers with the U.S. He agrees with his grandfather, former governor Rafael Hernández Colón, in viewing Puerto Rico as both a homeland and a nation and also rejecting its classification as a colony.

In the wake of Jenniffer González Colón's election to the office of governor, Hernández Rivera said, "Having a Republican governor seriously reduces the possibility that President Trump will attack Puerto Rico."

In May 2025, Hernández Rivera accused pro-statehood Puerto Rican government officials of failing to liaise with him, despite his position as resident commissioner, effectively Puerto Rico's sole federal-level representative.

In June 2025, Hernández Rivera participated in the New York Puerto Rican Day Parade, making him the first resident commissioner to attend since Aníbal Acevedo Vilá.

In July 2025, Pablo Hernández Rivera stated that statehood for Puerto Rico was impossible, and that the solution for the territory was to seek greater autonomy to enter into trade and tax agreements with other countries and to maximize the resources. Greater autonomy would provide Puerto Rico more opportunities to invest in economic development.

== Resident Commissioner of Puerto Rico ==
=== Committee assignments ===
- Committee on Homeland Security
  - Subcommittee on Counterterrorism and Intelligence
  - Subcommittee on Emergency Management and Technology
- Committee on Natural Resources
  - Subcommittee on Indian and Insular Affairs
  - Subcommittee on Oversight and Investigations

=== Caucus memberships ===
- Congressional Hispanic Caucus
- New Democratic Coalition

== Electoral history ==
2024 United States House of Representatives election in Puerto Rico
Party	Candidate	Votes	%	±%
Popular Democratic	Pablo Hernández Rivera	530,540	43.50%	+11.37%
New Progressive	William Villafañe	452,615	37.11%	−4.03%
Citizens' Victory	Ana Irma Rivera Lassén	115,710	9.49%	−3.16%
Project Dignity	Viviana Ramírez Morales	60,512	4.96%	−2.73%
Independence	Roberto Karlo Velázquez (Note: Paper candidate)	60,161	4.93%	−1.37%
Total votes		1,219,538	100.00%	
Popular Democratic gain from New Progressive				
Democratic gain from Republican				

== See also ==
- List of Harvard University politicians
- List of Hispanic and Latino Americans in the United States Congress
- List of new members of the 119th United States Congress

U.S. House of Representatives
Preceded by Jenniffer González	Resident Commissioner of Puerto Rico; 2025–present	Incumbent
Party political offices
Preceded by Jesús Manuel Ortiz	Chair of the Puerto Rico Popular Democratic Party; 2025–present	Incumbent
U.S. order of precedence (ceremonial)
Preceded by James Moylan	United States delegates by seniority 5th	Succeeded by Kimberlyn King-Hinds
