= Jorge Santini =

Puerto Rican politician

Jorge Santini Padilla
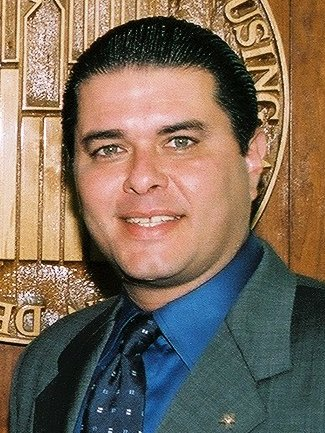

Mayor of San Juan
- In office January 2, 2001 – January 14, 2013
- Preceded by: Sila María Calderón
- Succeeded by: Carmen Yulín Cruz

Member of the Puerto Rico Senate from the San Juan district
- In office January 2, 1997 – January 2, 2001

Secretary General of the New Progressive Party
- Incumbent
- Assumed office March 27, 2025
- Preceded by: Hiram Torres Montalvo

Personal details
- Born: March 11, 1960 (age 66) San Juan, Puerto Rico
- Spouse: Irma Garriga
- Children: Odette Santini; Jorge Andrés Santini; Amanda Sofía Santini
- Education: University of Puerto Rico (BA); Interamerican University of Puerto Rico School of Law (JD)
- Profession: Politician; attorney

Jorge Santini Padilla (born March 11, 1960) is a Puerto Rican politician who previously served as the mayor of San Juan.

== State Service ==
In 1975, Santini became a member of the United States Marines Air Cadets Corps. At present, he is lieutenant colonel in the Puerto Rico State Guard, assigned to the Judge Advocate General's Corps. On September 18, 2002, President George W. Bush appointed Mayor Santini to serve on the National Infrastructure Advisory Council. As a member of the State Guard, Santini has never served in the military.

== Professional career ==
In 1982 he obtained his bachelor's degree with honors from the University of Puerto Rico, Río Piedras campus. In 1988 he was accepted as a member of the Puerto Rico Bar Association, American Bar Association, and Federal Bar Association. He also presided the Attorney Association of the Faculty of Law at the Interamerican University of Puerto Rico School of Law. Santini became a partner at the law firm of Miranda Cárdenas & Córdova where he specialized in medical malpractice suits.

He began his public service in 1993, during Pedro Rossello's gubernatorial term, Santini was appointed as his aide in the areas of Health, Social Welfare, and Hiring, as well as serving as the Governor's Legal Aide.

In 2007, he participated in the Summit of the Latin American Council in Honor of educational excellence. There the prize for educational excellence, a master's degree in educational management in Latin America and an honorary doctorate was awarded for commitment to education given by 16 universities, all in recognition of his work establishing the first municipal school system of Puerto Rico.

== Political career ==
=== Senator: 1997–2001 ===
In 1996, Santini decided to start a political career under the New Progressive Party (PNP). He was elected to the Senate of Puerto Rico at the 1996 general elections representing the District of San Juan. During that term, he served as Chairman of the Senate Judiciary Committee.

=== Mayor of San Juan ===
Santini entered the race for Mayor of San Juan in 1999 and challenged Senate President Charlie Rodriguez in a PNP primary. Rodríguez had been the choice of the party leadership, but Santini prevailed in the primary. He went on to defeat Popular Democratic Party candidate Eduardo Bhatia in the 2000 elections and sought reelection in 2004 defeating Bhatia for a second time. In his 6th year as Mayor of San Juan, Santini began inaugurating major projects such as the San Juan Natatorium in 2006, the San Juan Golf Academy in 2007, a sports-oriented magnet school and a bilingual municipal magnet school, and San Juan's Ronald Reagan Autism-Specialized Day Care Center.

In 2007, Santini was elected for a third term as Mayor of San Juan but was defeated in the 2012 San Juan mayoral election and left office on January 14, 2013. During his third term the municipality imposed a secret tax on properties in the city. Investigations into the scheme revealed that $1.3 million in revenue went missing. The municipal debt at the end of Santini's tenure had reached $18 million.

=== Senate of Puerto Rico ===
In 2017 Santini created Soto and Santini LLC, an advisory group providing professional services for the Senate of Puerto Rico and various government agencies. In 2020 the office of ethics sued Santini for income he earned working for the Senate and the National Guard simultaneously.

== Personal life ==
Santini married Irma Garriga on August 23, 1986. They have three children together: Odette (b. 1987), Jorge Andrés (b. 1996), and Amanda (b. 2003).

== See also ==
- 2000 San Juan, Puerto Rico mayoral election
- 2004 San Juan, Puerto Rico mayoral election
- 2008 San Juan, Puerto Rico mayoral election
- 2012 San Juan, Puerto Rico mayoral election
- List of Puerto Ricans
- Corsican immigration to Puerto Rico

Political offices
Preceded by Sila María Calderón	Mayor of San Juan; 2001-2012	Succeeded by Carmen Yulin Cruz
