= David Bernier =

Puerto Rican odontologist and politician

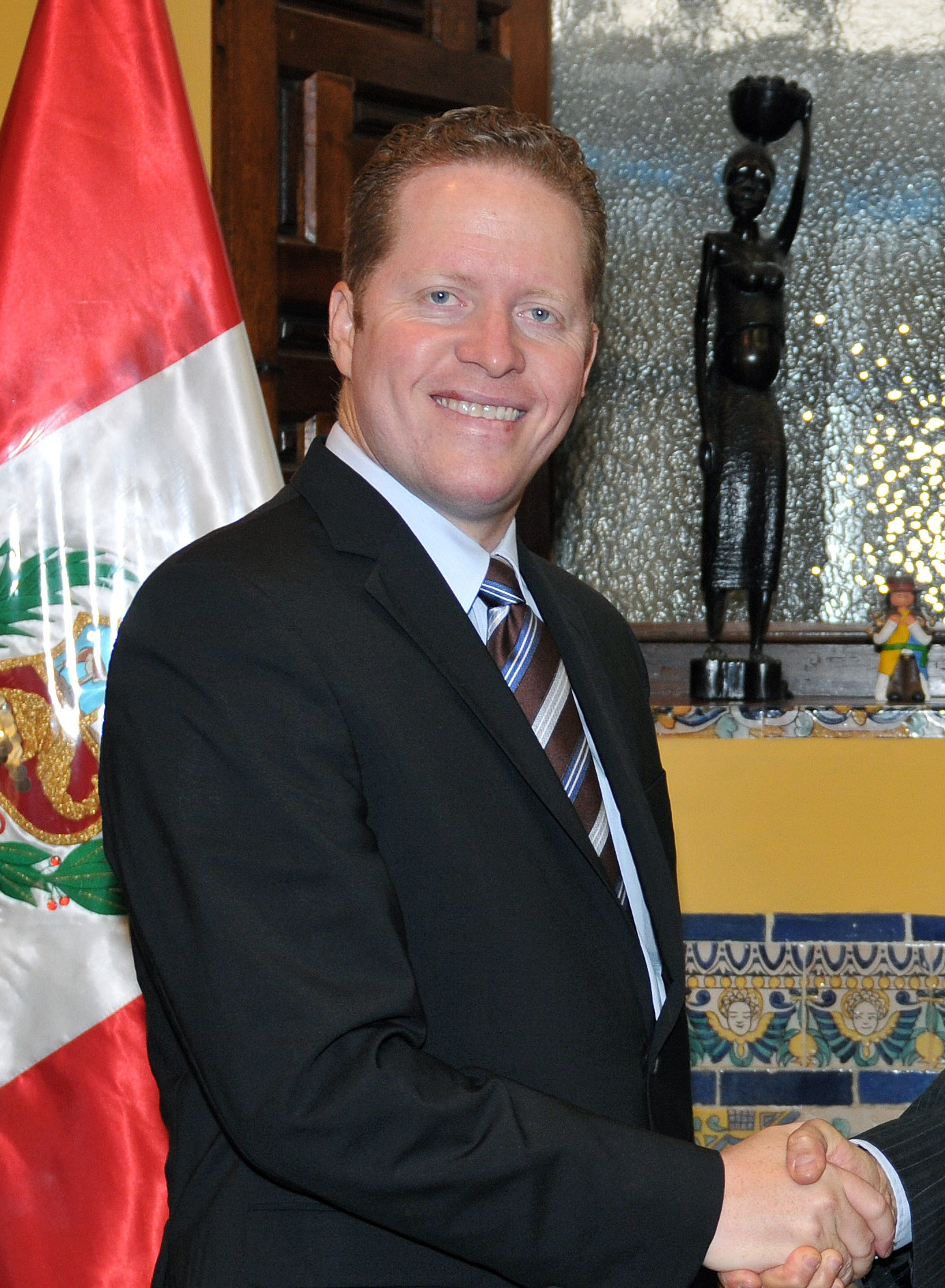

President of the Puerto Rico Popular Democratic Party
- In office December 30, 2015 – February 26, 2017
- Preceded by: Alejandro García Padilla
- Succeeded by: Héctor Ferrer

Secretary of State of Puerto Rico
- In office January 2, 2013 – October 30, 2015
- Governor: Alejandro García Padilla
- Preceded by: Kenneth McClintock
- Succeeded by: Javier González (acting)

President of the Puerto Rico Olympic Committee
- In office 2008–2012
- Preceded by: Héctor Cardona
- Succeeded by: Sara Rosario

Puerto Rico Secretary of Sports and Recreation
- In office January 2, 2005 – September 2008
- Governor: Aníbal Acevedo Vilá
- Preceded by: Jorge Fuentes
- Succeeded by: Henry Neumann

Personal details
- Born: David Enrique Bernier Rivera; January 21, 1977 (age 49) Patillas, Puerto Rico
- Party: Popular Democratic
- Other political affiliations: Democratic
- Spouse: Alexandra Fuentes (m. 2007)
- Children: 2
- Education: University of Puerto Rico at Cayey (BS); University of Puerto Rico School of Dental Medicine (DMD)

David Bernier
Medal record

Fencing

Representing Puerto Rico

Central American and Caribbean Games
Bronze medal – third place	1998 Maracaibo	Fencing

David Enrique "Quique" (Note: Caquías Cruz (2015; in Spanish) "En el hogar de la familia Bernier Rivera, en la urbanización San Benito de este municipio, había ayer unos padres nerviosos ante la expectativa del anuncio que en la tarde de hoy dará el quinto de sus seis hijos, al que llaman Quique.") Bernier Rivera (Spanish pronunciation: [daˈβið enˈrike βeɾˈnjeɾ riˈβeɾa]; born January 21, 1977) is a Puerto Rican dentist and politician that has served in various roles in public service in Puerto Rico. Bernier first served as executive director of the Office of Youth Affairs of Puerto Rico and was later confirmed as the youngest Secretary of Sports and Recreation of Puerto Rico in history. Four years later, he was unanimously confirmed as Secretary of State of Puerto Rico for the administration of Alejandro García Padilla. He was the 2016 candidate for Governor of Puerto Rico of the Popular Democratic Party.

Ideologically, Bernier is affiliated with two parties: one within Puerto Rico and another within the United States as a whole. Within Puerto Rico, he used to preside the Popular Democratic Party (PPD in Spanish) and identifies as a sovereigntist—a member of a faction within the PPD that advocates for Puerto Rico to enter a compact of free association with the United States rather than continuing the status quo. At the national level, however, Bernier is a member of the Democratic Party of the United States and was a staunch supporter of President Barack Obama while he was President.

Outside politics, Bernier was an accomplished athlete. He was a member of the Puerto Rican national fencing team, in which he represented the island in the Pan American Games and in the Central American and Caribbean Games. As a Pan American athlete, he was a Pan American Youth Champion for three consecutive years. He also won a bronze medal in the 1998 Central American and Caribbean Games celebrated in Maracaibo, Venezuela.

His accomplishments as an athlete eventually led him to public service. As an accomplished youngster, governor Sila María Calderón decided to appoint Bernier to lead the Puerto Rico Office of Youth Affairs in 2003. Two years later, governor Aníbal Acevedo Vilá appointed him as Secretary of Sports of Puerto Rico. But as a different political party took over the government, Bernier opted to leave his incumbency after four years of service. A few months later he was elected president of the Puerto Rico Olympic Committee. In that capacity Bernier led the efforts to organize the 2010 Central American and Caribbean Games celebrated in Mayaguez. A few years later and as he was preparing for his re-election for president of the committee, governor Alejandro García Padilla appointed him as Secretary of State of Puerto Rico. In that role, Bernier transformed the Department of State of Puerto Rico by creating the Morales Carrión Diplomatic and Foreign Relations School, by opening several Puerto Rican trade promotion offices in foreign countries, and by reducing the backlog of business charters filings and intellectual property filings. Bernier, however, left his incumbency once again but this time to run for governor of Puerto Rico in the 2016 general election for the Popular Democratic Party.

Bernier campaigned to become the 12th Governor of the Commonwealth of Puerto Rico. He began his tour in February 2016 under the name "Tour Colorao" (English: Red-colored Tour) in reference to his redheadedness. On November 8, 2016, Bernier lost the 2016 Governor's race, losing to main rival Ricky Rosselló of the New Progressive Party (PNP)

== Early life ==
David Enrique Bernier Rivera was born in Patillas, the fifth of six children, to Luis David Bernier Rivera, a professor at the University of Puerto Rico at Ponce, and Celia Rivera Guzmán, a nurse. He and his younger brother, Víctor, attended the María Dávila Semidey School in Patillas, where they received their primary education. After this, they enrolled in the school of sports of the Albergue Olímpico located in Salinas. Bernier then became a member of the National Fencing Selection of Puerto Rico, during his school years, and represented Puerto Rico in events worldwide. He was also president of the first graduating class of the Albergue Olímpico school.

Bernier later studied at the University of Puerto Rico at Cayey where he received a bachelor's degree in natural sciences, graduating magna cum laude. He then completed a doctorate in odontology at the University of Puerto Rico School of Dental Medicine. He was also president of the student council and was also named president of the Association of Athletes of High Endurance.

== Sports life ==
As a member of the National Fencing Selection of Puerto Rico, Bernier was the Panamerican Youth Champion for three consecutive years. He also won the bronze medal in the 1998 Central American and Caribbean Games, celebrated in Maracaibo, Venezuela.

Bernier and his brother went to Carolina, where they trained under trainer Gilberto Peña.

On 2004, Bernier was inducted into the Puerto Rican Sports Hall of Fame.

In September 2008, Bernier resigned to his position as Secretary of Sports and Recreation to run for President of the Puerto Rico Olympic Committee. The election for president of the Olympic Committee took place on October 1, 2008. Bernier won the seat receiving 26 votes from the Federation delegates versus 13 votes in favor of incumbent Héctor Cardona.

As president of the Olympic Committee, Bernier dealt with the 2010 Central American and Caribbean Games in Mayagüez, the 2011 Pan American Games in Guadalajara, and the 2012 Summer Olympics in London.

== First years in public service ==
In 2003, Governor Sila Calderón appointed Bernier as executive director of the Office of Youth Affairs. On September 26, 2003, the Senate of Puerto Rico confirmed Bernier for the position.

On January 4, 2005, he resigned his post at the Office of Youth Affairs after being named Secretary of the Puerto Rico Department of Sports and Recreation by Governor Aníbal Acevedo Vilá. He was unanimously confirmed in that post by the Senate of Puerto Rico, presided over by Kenneth McClintock, who later preceded him as secretary of state. In 2006, after the Senate failed to confirm two nominees to replace him at the Office of Youth Affairs, the Governor nominated him once again to that job, which he held simultaneously with the position of Secretary of Sports and Recreation, once he was again confirmed by the Senate.

On January 31, 2008, Bernier became president of the committee organizing the 2010 Central American and Caribbean Games. Following his designation he announced that he would discuss with the mayors of adjacent municipalities to help in the process.

== Secretary of State ==
On November 15, 2012, Governor-elect Alejandro García Padilla appointed Bernier to succeed Kenneth McClintock as Puerto Rico's 23rd Secretary of State, which also entails the role of lieutenant governor. At the moment, Bernier was preparing to be reelected as president of the Olympic Committee when he was approached by García Padilla for the position. He was sworn into his recess appointment by Puerto Rico Supreme Court Chief Justice Federico Hernández Denton and he has since been unanimously confirmed by the Senate of Puerto Rico and the Puerto Rico House of Representatives. Holding the title of Secretary of State entails serving in the dual role of lieutenant governor. As such, he has served as acting governor whenever Governor García Padilla has been out of Puerto Rico. At least once during his term, the acting governorship has been delegated to Attorney General Luis Sánchez Betances when both the Governor and Bernier have been absent, and when General Sánchez Betances has also been away, Secretary of the Treasury Melba Acosta has served as acting governor. He submitted his resignation as secretary of state on October 25, 2015, effective October 30, 2015. His Deputy Secretary, Javier González, will become acting secretary until a new secretary of state is appointed and qualified.

As secretary of state, he continued and expanded several digitalization projects begun by his predecessor, created the Arturo Morales-Carrión International Relations Internship Program and coordinated the Campus Puerto Rico project to promote the Commonwealth as a destination for college students from the rest of the United States and Latin America.

He is a member of the National Association of Secretaries of State and the National Lieutenant Governors Association, two organizations that held conventions in Puerto Rico during his predecessor Kenneth McClintock's incumbency.

== Gubernatorial campaign ==
On December 16, 2015, Bernier announced he would run for governor under the PPD during the 2016 general elections. His announcement came two days after incumbent governor Alejandro García Padilla announced he would not seek re-election. It was the first time Bernier ran for an elective office in politics. If he was elected governor, he would have been the second-youngest in Puerto Rico's history. On November 8, 2016, Bernier lost the 2016 Governor's race, losing to main rival Ricky Rosselló of the New Progressive Party (PNP)

=== Endorsements ===
Tego Calderón Puerto Rican rapper, songwriter and actor

Ramón "Papo" Brenes journalist

Alexandra Fuentes Puerto Rican actress, model, TV/radio host and candidate's wife

Jaime Espinal freestyle wrestler and Olympic silver medalist

Chicky Starr retired Puerto Rican professional wrestler

Karla Monroig actress, model, TV/radio host

== Personal life ==
Bernier married actress and host Alexandra Fuentes in 2007. They have two children together: a son, Adrián David, and a daughter, Miranda. Bernier has stated that reading the work of Gabriel García Márquez influenced his personal ideology by helping him understand the "Puerto Rican reality with the Latin American context". Under his leadership, the Department of State held an homage to the author on April 23, 2014.

== See also ==
- List of Puerto Ricans

== Notes ==
Political offices
Preceded by Kenneth McClintock	Secretary of State of Puerto Rico; 2013–2015	Succeeded by Javier González; Acting
Party political offices
Preceded by Alejandro García Padilla	Chair of the Puerto Rico Popular Democratic Party; 2015–2017	Succeeded by Héctor Ferrer
Preceded by Alejandro García Padilla	Popular Democratic nominee for Governor of Puerto Rico; 2016	Succeeded by Carlos Delgado Altieri
