= Aníbal José Torres =

Puerto Rico politician

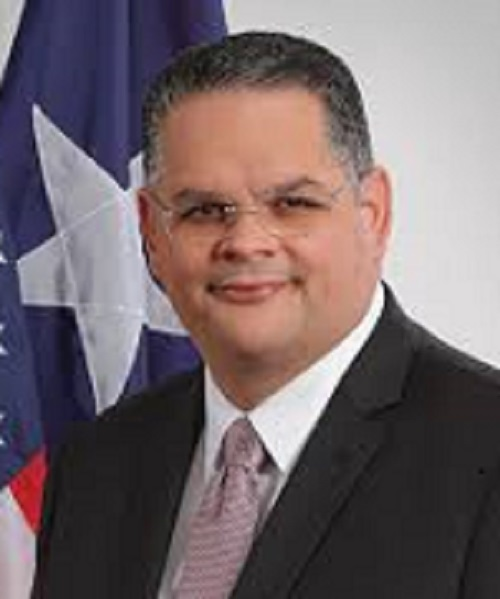

Mayor of Dorado
- Incumbent
- Assumed office October 29, 2025
- Preceded by: Carlos López Rivera

President of the Puerto Rico Popular Democratic Party
- In office December 2, 2018 – August 20, 2020
- Preceded by: Brenda López de Arrarás (Acting)
- Succeeded by: Carlos Delgado Altieri

Majority Leader of the Puerto Rico Senate
- In office January 14, 2013 – January 1, 2017
- Preceded by: Larry Seilhamer Rodríguez
- Succeeded by: Carmelo Ríos Santiago

Member of the Puerto Rico Senate from the at-large district
- In office January 2, 2013 – January 2, 2021

Chief of Staff of Puerto Rico
- In office January 2, 2005 – January 1, 2009
- Governor: Aníbal Acevedo Vilá
- Preceded by: César Miranda
- Succeeded by: Marcos Rodríguez Ema

Personal details
- Born: Aníbal José Torres Torres; April 17, 1975 (age 51) San Juan, Puerto Rico
- Party: Popular Democratic
- Other political affiliations: Democratic
- Education: Interamerican University of Puerto Rico (BA); Eugenio María de Hostos School of Law (JD)

Aníbal José "Jossie" Torres is a Puerto Rican politician, lawyer and current mayor of Dorado, affiliated with the Popular Democratic Party (PPD). Torres has also served in several positions of leadership within his party. He served as Secretary of the party during the 2000s, before being appointed as Puerto Rico Chief of Staff by elected Governor Aníbal Acevedo Vilá in 2005. After serving four years, he returned to his position as Secretary of the PPD, before deciding to run for the Senate of Puerto Rico at the 2012 general elections. He is now the current mayor of Dorado, Puerto Rico, after the passing of Carlos López Rivera, on October 17, 2025.

== Biography ==
Aníbal José Torres was born in San Juan, Puerto Rico. He ran for mayor of Orocovis at the 2000 general elections. However, he lost to the candidate of the PNP, Jesús Colón Berlingeri, by less than 340 votes.

Has a Juris Doctor degree from the Eugenio María de Hostos School of Law in Mayaguez, Puerto Rico, and a B.A. in political science from the Interamerican University of Puerto Rico.

After that, Torres served as Secretary of the Popular Democratic Party for several years. When Aníbal Acevedo Vilá was elected Governor of Puerto Rico at the 2004 general elections, he appointed Torres to serve as his chief of staff. Torres served in this position until the end of Acevedo Vila's term in January 2009.

After that, Torres returned to his position as Secretary of the party. However, he decided to run for the Senate of Puerto Rico, presenting his candidacy on October 12, 2011. At the 2012 PPD primaries, Torres was the second candidate to the Senate with most votes.

Was officially elected as Chair of the Puerto Rico Popular Democratic Party on at the 2018 Puerto Rico Popular Democratic Party convention and served until 2020.

In 2022, he was appointed Municipal Administrator of the City of Dorado, Puerto Rico. After the passing of Carlos López Rivera, on October 17, 2025, he became officially the Mayor of Dorado on October 29, 2025.

Senate of Puerto Rico
Preceded by Larry Seilhamer Rodríguez	Majority Leader of the Puerto Rico Senate; 2013–2017	Succeeded by Carmelo Ríos Santiago
Party political offices
Preceded by Brenda López de Arrarás; Acting	Chair of the Puerto Rico Popular Democratic Party; 2018–2020	Succeeded by Carlos Delgado Altieri
Political offices
Preceded by Carlos López Rivera	Mayor of Dorado, Puerto Rico; 2025-present	Incumbent
