= Carlos Delgado Altieri =

Puerto Rican politician (born 1960)

Charlie Delgado
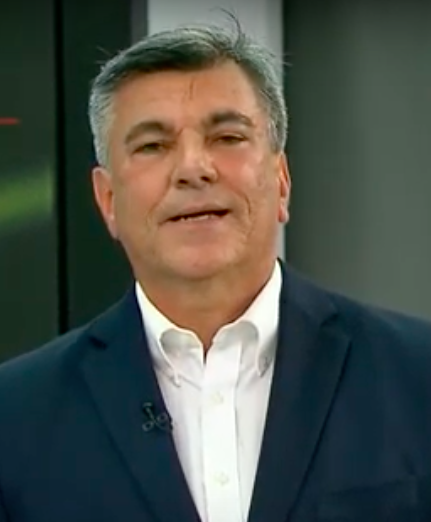

President of the Puerto Rico Popular Democratic Party
- In office August 20, 2020 – February 23, 2021
- Preceded by: Aníbal José Torres
- Succeeded by: Jose Luis Dalmau

Mayor of Isabela
- In office January 14, 2001 – January 16, 2021
- Preceded by: Carmelo Pérez Rivera
- Succeeded by: Ricky Méndez Pérez

Personal details
- Born: January 9, 1960 (age 65); Lares, Puerto Rico
- Political party: Popular Democratic
- Spouse: Rosa Irizarry Silvestrini (deceased)
- Children: 3
- Education: University of Puerto Rico, Río Piedras (BBA)

Carlos “Charlie” Delgado Altieri (born January 9, 1960) is a Puerto Rican politician who served as the mayor of Isabela from 2001 to 2021. He has also served as the president of the Popular Democratic Party since August 20, 2020 until February 23, 2021. He was the Popular Democratic Party nominee for Governor of Puerto Rico in 2020, losing to New Progressive Pedro Pierluisi. He is also a candidate for the 2024 Puerto Rico gubernatorial election.

== Early life and education ==
Born in Lares, Puerto Rico, he obtained a Bachelor of Business Administration with a concentration in marketing from the University of Puerto Rico.

== Career ==
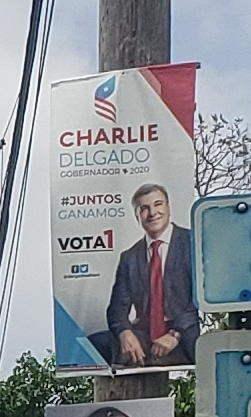
2020 campaign sign

He was the Popular Democratic Party's nominee for Governor of Puerto Rico in the 2020 elections, after defeating San Juan Mayor Carmen Yulín Cruz and Senator Eduardo Bhatia in the primaries. He faced Pedro Pierluisi (PNP), Juan Dalmau (PIP), César Vázquez (PD), Alexandra Lúgaro (MVC), and Eliezer Molina (IND) in the general elections of November 3, 2020. He lost the gubernatorial race to Pedro Pierluisi (PNP)

Political offices
Preceded by Carmelo Pérez Rivera	Mayor of Isabela; 2001–2021	Succeeded by Miguel Enrique Méndez
Party political offices
Preceded by Aníbal José Torres	Chair of the Puerto Rico Popular Democratic Party; 2020–2021	Succeeded by José Luis Dalmau
Preceded by David Bernier	Popular Democratic nominee for Governor of Puerto Rico; 2020	Succeeded by Jesús Manuel Ortiz
