= Popular Democratic Party (Puerto Rico) =

Political party in Puerto Rico

Popular Democratic Party Partido Popular Democrático
- President: Pablo José Hernández Rivera
- Secretary-General: Manuel Calderón Cerame
- Vice President: Carlos Delgado Altieri; Migdalia González
- Founder: Luis Muñoz Marín
- Founded: July 22, 1938; 88 years ago
- Split from: Liberal Party
- Headquarters: Puerta de Tierra, San Juan, Puerto Rico
- Youth wing: Swanny Enit Vargas
- Women's wing: Julia Nazario
- Ideology: Liberalism; Social liberalism; Pro-Commonwealth; Decentralism
- Political position: Centre
- Colors: Red
- Slogan: "Pan, Tierra y Libertad" (Bread, Land and Freedom)
- Anthem: "Jalda Arriba" (Johnny Rodriguez)
- Seats in the Senate: 5 / 28
- Seats in the House of Representatives: 13 / 53
- Municipalities: 41 / 78
- Seats in the U.S. House: 1 / 1

Website
- ppdpr.net

The Popular Democratic Party (Spanish: Partido Popular Democrático, PPD) is a political party in Puerto Rico that advocates for the current status of the archipelago and island as an estado libre asociado (commonwealth), an unincorporated territory of the United States with constitutional self-governance. (Note: Party platform 2012 (in Spanish) p. 248. "El Partido Popular Democrático reafirma que el Estado Libre Asociado es la opción de estatus que mejor representa las aspiraciones del Pueblo de Puerto Rico.") (Note: Party platform 2012 (in Spanish) p. 248 "El Partido Popular Democrático apoya firmemente el desarrollo del Estatus Estado Libre Asociado de Puerto Rico. El Partido Popular rechaza cualquier modificación de estatus que se aparte de estos principios de union permanente con Estados Unidos y que atente contra nuestra nacionalidad puertorriqueña o que menoscabe nuestra identidad lingüística y cultural.") The party was founded in 1938 by dissidents from the Puerto Rican Liberal Party and the Unionist Party.

As one of the long-standing parties on the island, the PPD has played a significant role in the history of Puerto Rico. In the early 1950s, for example, the party held a majority in the delegation convened to draft the Constitution of Puerto Rico. Once the constitution was ratified, the document was proclaimed by the party's leader and co-founder, Luis Muñoz Marín—who, in doing so, became the first Puerto Rican governor elected by the people of Puerto Rico. Since 1952, the party has ruled all branches of the Puerto Rican government for a total of 36 years, while establishing many of the institutions that permeate Puerto Rican society today.

Today, the party is one of the two major parties in Puerto Rico with significant political strength. In the executive branch, the party's most recent governor was Alejandro García Padilla who governed the island from 2013 to 2017; while in the legislative branch, the party is the largest in both the House and the Senate, though it is short of an overall majority in both. On the Supreme Court, the party is in the minority, though the Chief Justice of the Supreme Court is from the PPD; a circumstance that allows the party to designate political appointees in the judicial branch since the chief justice is also constitutionally the chief judicial administrator. Finally, in the municipal landscape, the party holds more than half of the seats of mayors.

Ideologically, the PPD differs from the other parties active in the island. Historically, for example, the party's opponent has been the New Progressive Party (PNP in Spanish). Both parties have ruled the island unopposed for years after the Puerto Rican constitution was ratified in 1952.

Members of the party are referred to in different terms depending on their faction. In general, those affiliated to the party are commonly called populares (English: "populars") and mostly affiliate with the Democratic Party of the United States. Internally, members aligned with the delegation that drafted the constitution compose the largest faction and are referred to as 'conservatives'. A smaller 'liberal' faction is referred to as the soberanistas, and advocates for Puerto Rico to enter a compact of free association with the United States rather than remain an unincorporated territory under the United States.

== History ==
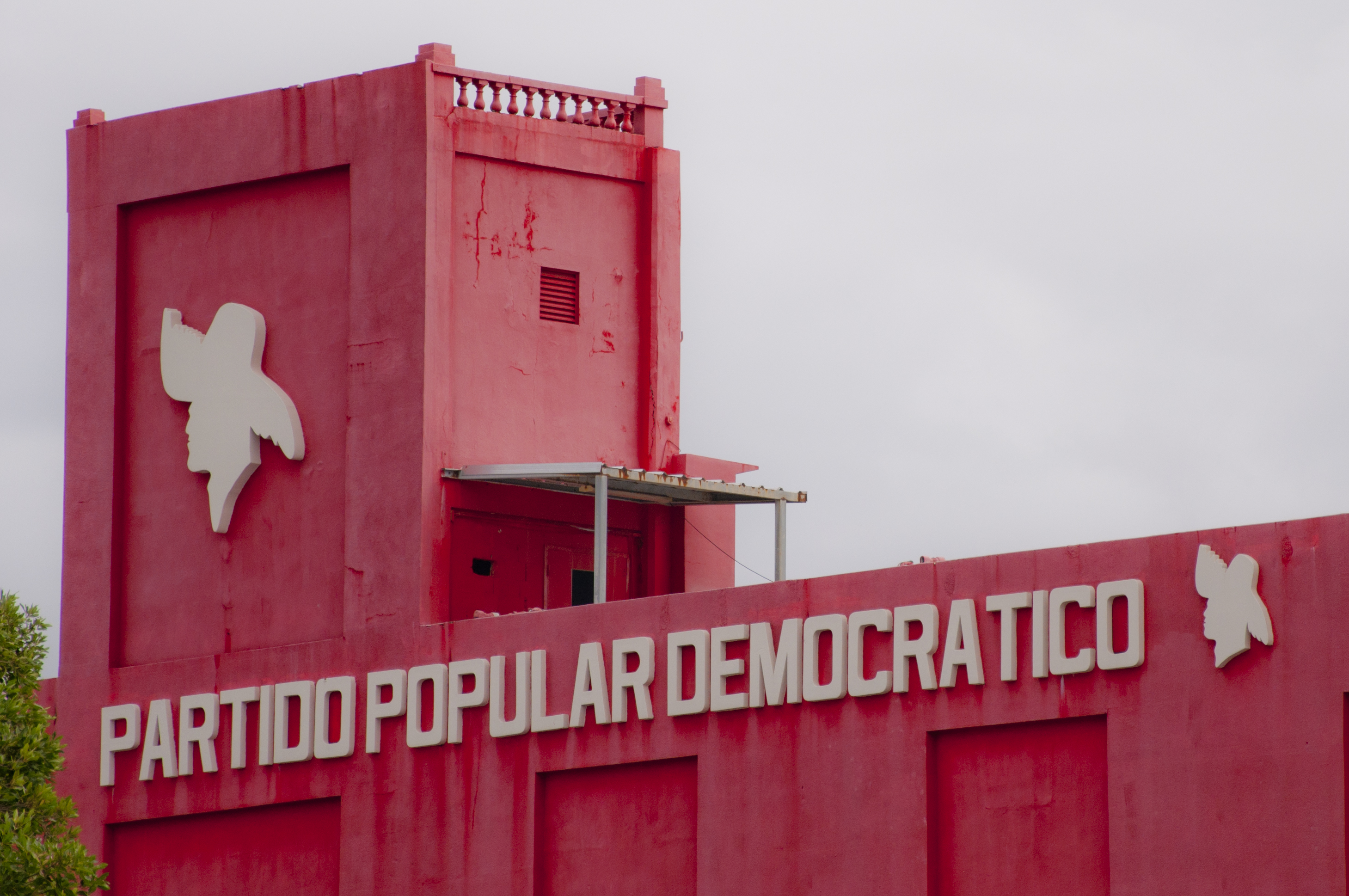
Building housing Partido Popular Democratico in Puerta de Tierra, San Juan

=== Foundation ===
Dissidents expelled from the Liberal Party of Puerto Rico (then led by Antonio R. Barceló) founded the PPD in 1938. Many of them were part of the old socialist movement of Puerto Rico. The dissident faction, initially calling themselves the Partido Liberal, Neto, Auténtico y Completo ("Clear, Net, Authentic, and Complete Liberal Party") (PPD), was led by Luis Muñoz Marín. In 1937, the debate had concerned the differences between the moderate demands of autonomy leading to gradual independence by the Liberal Party faction led by Barcelo, and the desire for more radical demands of immediate independence and social reform by Muñoz and his followers.

=== 1940s ===
In 1940, the highest elective political office in Puerto Rico was as president of its Senate. At the time, the governor was appointed by the president of the United States; no native-born Puerto Ricans were appointed to the post until 1946, when Jesús T. Piñero – one of the original founders of the PPD – was appointed by U.S. President Harry S. Truman.

In the 1940 election, the Popular Democratic Party of Puerto Rico (PPD) finished in a dead heat with the Liberal Party. Luis Muñoz Marín of the PPD brokered an alliance with minor Puerto Rican factions so as to secure his position as Senate president; such coalition-building was fundamental to the multi-party society. The elections in 1944 and 1948 resulted in greater victory margins for the PPD; nearly all the legislative posts and mayoral races in Puerto Rico were won by PPD candidates.

On May 21, 1948, a member of the PPD introduced a bill before the Puerto Rican Senate which would restrain the rights of the independence and nationalist movements on the archipelago. The Senate, which at the time was controlled by the PPD and presided by Muñoz Marín, approved the bill. This bill, which resembled the anti-communist Smith Act passed in the United States in 1940, became known as the Ley de la Mordaza (Gag Law, technically "Law 53 of 1948") when the U.S.-appointed governor of Puerto Rico, Piñero, signed it into law on June 10, 1948.

Under this new law it became a crime to print, publish, sell, or exhibit any material intended to paralyze or destroy the insular government; or to organize any society, group or assembly of people with a similar destructive intent. It made it illegal to sing a patriotic song, and reinforced the 1898 law that had made it illegal to display the Flag of Puerto Rico, with anyone found guilty of disobeying the law in any way being subject to a sentence of up to ten years imprisonment, a fine of up to US$10,000 (equivalent to $134,000 in 2025), or both, for each offence. According to Dr. Leopoldo Figueroa, a non-PPD member of the Puerto Rico House of Representatives, the law was repressive and violated the First Amendment of the US Constitution which guarantees Freedom of Speech. He pointed out that the law was a violation of the civil rights of the people of Puerto Rico. Numerous Nationalists were arrested under the law, and Figeroa defended 15 of them. He also defended a man in a case taken to the US Supreme Court, to challenge the "Gag Law" on the basis of the government's not having had sufficient evidence to arrest the suspect. The Supreme Court upheld the constitutionality of the law.

Once Jesús T. Piñero stepped down as the last U.S.-appointed governor, the governor's office became an elected position. In 1949, under the leadership of Muñoz Marín, the PPD won the first gubernatorial elections in Puerto Rico, and Muñoz became the first elected governor of the island.

He served for what is the longest rule by any of the nearly 200 governors (starting with Juan Ponce de León in 1508) in Puerto Rican history, being re-elected three times, and serving a total of four 4-year terms, or 16 years.

=== 1950s ===
During the 1950s, Luis Muñoz Marín was twice re-elected (1952, 1956) as Puerto Rico's governor. In 1952 he assumed the responsibility of pushing forward the drafting of a constitution to create the Commonwealth of Puerto Rico. The constitution was passed by the legislature and overwhelmingly approved by the people with an 82% vote. On July 25, 1952, the new constitution went into effect. Munoz pushed his political-financial platform, called Operation Bootstrap (Operación Manos a la Obra), in which he stimulated Puerto Rico's economy to develop industry. Teodoro Moscoso was in charge of the project.

=== 1960s ===
Muñoz Marín was re-elected in 1960, his fourth consecutive term. In 1964, Muñoz Marín chose not to run for a fifth term. Roberto Sánchez Vilella, representing the PPD, became the second governor to be democratically elected in Puerto Rico. The party remained in control of the governor's office until 1968.

By the time of the 1968 election, personal and irreconcilable differences had developed between Sánchez Vilella and PPD party president Muñoz Marín. Muñoz Marín opposed Sánchez Vilella's attempt to run for reelection. At a PPD party assembly, Munoz nominated Luis Negrón López as his candidate for governor, ruining any chance that Sánchez Vilella would be considered in the party's primary process.

Sánchez Vilella left to create a new party called the People's Party (Partido del Pueblo, PP). The PP's motto was "Que el pueblo decida", (Let the people decide). The motto was obviously directed at Muñoz Marín, who denied Sánchez Vilella a chance to compete in a party primary.

With Sánchez Vilella and Negrón López competing as candidates for different – but nearly identical – parties, the electorate split their votes. Luis A. Ferré of the New Progressive Party (Partido Nuevo Progresista, PNP), which advocates for statehood, won the gubernatorial election with a plurality of votes among the three major parties. This was the first defeat of the PPD in a general election since its founding.

=== 1970s ===
By 1972, the PPD had a young and fresh leader in former senate president Rafael Hernández Colón. After the 1968 electoral defeat, Muñoz Marín left the island and went into "exile" in Italy to stay away from local politics and let the PPD find its new direction without him.

Muñoz Marín did not return to Puerto Rico until the PPD had selected Hernández Colón as its new leader and candidate for governor. Muñoz Marín introduced him before 300,000 people in Hato Rey at a party meeting. In the 1972 general election, Hernández Colón defeated Ferré by a wide margin, and his party won in all but four municipalities. In 1976, Carlos Romero Barceló, mayor of San Juan and the PNP candidate, defeated Hernández Colón.

=== 1980s ===
In 1980, Rafael Hernández Colón ran again as the PPD gubernatorial candidate. Controversy arose when PPD followers alleged that there were irregularities during the vote count. The power went out during the night while results were being counted. PPD supporters said that, before the power went out, the vote count was favoring Hernández Colón, but when the power was restored, results started favoring Romero Barceló. The Populares alleged fraud and Hernandez Colón said, "Populares, a defender esos votos a las trincheras de la lucha." (Populares, let's fight for those votes in the trenches). After the recount, Romero Barceló of the PNP won by 3,000 votes. The PPD won almost every other part of the election.

In 1984, Hernández Colón was elected again as governor, defeating his long-time political rival Romero Barceló of the PNP. His second term was marked by his successful fight to keep federal Law 936 (U.S.C. TITLE 26, Subtitle A, CHAPTER 1, Subchapter N, PART III, Subpart D, § 936, "Puerto Rico and Possession Tax Credit") in force. The PDP had helped establish the law, which gave tax breaks to American companies operating in Puerto Rico in order to encourage new businesses.

In 1988, Hernández Colón was re-elected by a comfortable margin, defeating Corrada del Río of the PNP. The two candidates conducted a formal debate on issues. That same year Héctor Luis Acevedo, the PPD mayoral candidate for San Juan, won the San Juan mayoral race by only 49 votes.

In 1988, Santos Ortiz, a.k.a. "El Negro", mayor of Cabo Rojo, left the PPD. He ran for mayor in the next election as an independent, and was the first person not affiliated with Munoz Marin and any of the three major parties in Puerto Rico to win an elected position.

=== 1990s ===
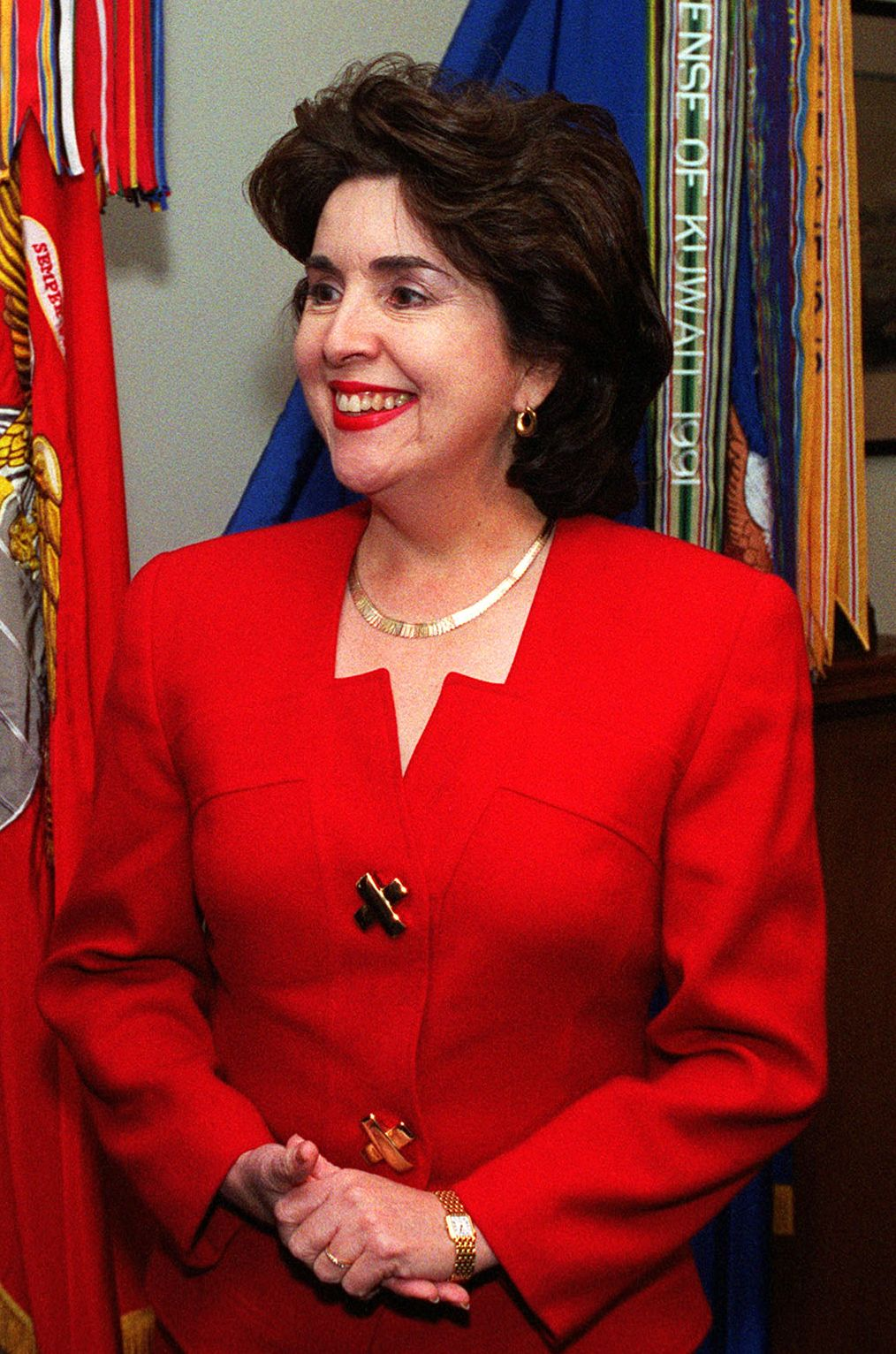
Sila Calderón

In 1992, after Hernández Colón decided not to run for governor again, the PPD elected Victoria Muñoz Mendoza, daughter of Luis Muñoz Marín, as its candidate. The first woman in Puerto Rican history to run for governor, she lost the election to Pedro Rosselló.

In 1996, Héctor Luis Acevedo ran for governor from the PPD, but lost to Roselló. That year, the PPD won San Juan mayoralty with its candidate, Sila María Calderón.

==== Plebiscites on political status ====
The opposition party, PNP, led two campaigns for Puerto Rican statehood in 1993 and 1998. Locally enacted plebiscites were held to consult the Puerto Rican people on the issue of future political status of the island in relation to the United States. In 1993 the PPD campaigned in favor of the status quo Commonwealth, while the PNP opposition campaigned for full statehood. Voters supported continuation of the Commonwealth option, which received 48% of the votes.

In 1998, the PNP Governor Pedro Rosselló carried out a non-binding plebiscite on political status, in which voters were asked to choose from one of four political status options (statehood, free association, commonwealth, or independence) or a fifth one, "none of the above". The Popular Democratic Party led a campaign to boycott the plebiscite, calling on the electorate to vote for the "none of the above" option. The boycott was successful, as the "none of the above" choice garnered more votes than any of the other options.

Among the four alternatives, the statehood option won the most votes. Rosselló argued before the US Congress that statehood had won the plebiscite. He considered votes for the "none of the above" option to be invalid.

=== 2000s ===
In 2000, Sila María Calderón regained the governor's seat for the PPD, defeating PNP's candidate Carlos Ignacio Pesquera, and Puerto Rican Independence Party (PIP) candidate Ruben Berrios.

After Calderón announced that she would not be running for governor in 2004, Aníbal Acevedo Vilá emerged as the new candidate. He was the current Resident Commissioner and a former PPD president. Acevedo Vilá was victorious in the 2004 elections against a former governor, Pedro Rosselló. He was the fifth governor from the Popular Democratic Party.

On January 8, 2007 Governor Aníbal Acevedo Vilá stated that he intends to garner support to have the political status of Puerto Rico considered before the General Assembly of the United Nations (UN). He also expressed that he expected such support to come from both inside and outside of Puerto Rico as well as from within and beyond the PPD. The Associated Press reported that Governor Acevedo Vilá announced that "We have started negotiations with other sectors of Puerto Rico, to see in what way we can accelerate that issue and achieve more allies at the UN".

On March 27, 2008 governor Acevedo Vila had been indicted with 24 federal counts ranging from conspiracy to wire fraud relating to the governor's campaign finances when he was acting as Resident Commissioner of Puerto Rico in the US Congress. However, 15 of these charges were quickly dismissed on revision by the judge. On March 20, 2009, a federal grand jury decided there was not sufficient basis to try Acevedo Vila on the remaining charges and he was released.

In November 2008, Azcevedo Vilá ran for re-election against the PNP gubernatorial candidate, Luis Fortuño, but was defeated. The PPD selected Héctor Ferrer Ríos as the next president of the party.

=== 2010s ===
On the elections held on November 6, 2012, the party regained the top offices: Alejandro García Padilla was elected governor and Carmen "Yulín" Cruz was elected as Mayor of San Juan. The party also took control of the House Of Representatives and Senate of Puerto Rico.

On the elections held on November 8, 2016, the party lost governorship, the House of Representatives and Senate of Puerto Rico. The Popular Democratic Party retained a majority of the mayoralty races in the island, with a total of 45 out of 78 municipalities. The New Progressive Party (PNP) won a total of 33.

=== 2020s ===
On the elections held on November 3, 2020, the party nominated Charlie Delgado for governor after the 2020 Popular Democratic Party of Puerto Rico primaries and nominated Anibal Acevedo Vilá for resident commissioner. The PPD lost the governorship once again and Acevedo Vilá also lost the 2020 United States House of Representatives election in Puerto Rico. However, the party won both the House of Representatives and Senate of Puerto Rico.

== Political ideals ==
The PPD political platform calls for a free associated state, autonomous, Puerto Rico that maintains a voluntary relationship with the federal government of United States in areas of mutual benefit, such as national defense, like any other state. Two notable areas of discontent with the current political arrangement are the taxation system and the empowerment of the courts. Currently, custom duties and the authority to enter into treaties with foreign nations remain within the control of the federal government of the United States. In the legal realm, decisions of the Puerto Rico Supreme Court can be overruled by higher courts in the United States. PPD supporters charge that this is unsatisfactory arrangement given that Puerto Ricans are not allowed to exercise their democratic right to vote for the person that appoints those judges - the President of the United States. Puerto Ricans are also not allowed to exercise their democratic right to elect Senatorial representation into the US Senate, the authority within the US of government that is empowered to approving appointees into the federal court system. Furthermore, Puerto Rican court decisions must be made consistent with the laws of the United States and in alignment with the Constitution of the United States.

The PPD objectives have trended towards gaining further autonomy and greater local control over the foreign relations of the Commonwealth. The PPD supports Puerto Rico taking on more of the character of an autonomous territory rather than becoming a state of the American Union. Puerto Ricans, for example, pride themselves in having their own Olympics representation, having an identity with Spanish as their mother tongue, and sharing an appreciation for their own unique cultural identity.

At its 2007 convention, the PPD approved a new philosophy and set of ideals for the party. The new philosophy commits the party to defending a political status for the island that is based in the irrevocable right of the people of Puerto Rico to form a sovereign country. This shift in philosophy caused a stir among party detractors, since the PPD was not known for being that liberal before. Its conservative stance had been represented by its unshakable defense of the commonwealth status quo.

In January 2010, the "governing board" of the party approved a resolution presented by the current party president Héctor Ferrer, among others, rejecting the free association concept to develop the commonwealth status based on the current free association compacts of the United States with the pacific jurisdictions; the resolution indicate that this free associations compacts does not recognize the indissoluble link between the U.S. and Puerto Rico of the United States Citizenship. Other members of the party reject the resolution indicating that is not in agreement with the official position adopted by the party "general assembly" on the 2007 convention. They indicated that the "government board" could not revoke the decisions of the party "general assembly" and just the "general assembly" itself as the party's top organ could revoke the 2007 decisions.

== Party logo and song ==
The PPD uses as a logo the silhouette of a rural farm worker, jibaro, wearing a traditional straw hat (pava), with the words "pan, tierra, libertad" (bread, land, freedom). The party logo was designed by Antonio Colorado Sr., one of Muñoz's party staff members and an eventual cabinet member. In 2016, the logo was updated to include a woman and the words "pan, tierra, libertad' were substituted with "unidad, trabajo, prosperidad" ("unity, work, prosperity"). After defeat in the 2016 gubernatorial race, the logo was reverted to the original.

The PPD is unique in Puerto Rican politics in having adopted an anthem. "Jalda Arriba" was written by Johnny Rodriguez, a famous Puerto Rican singer, composer and club owner. He dedicated the song to former governor Luis Muñoz Marín. The song also became strongly associated with the PPD because of this. Rodriguez was the elder brother of Tito Rodríguez, one of Puerto Rico's most famous international singers.

=== Jalda Arriba ===
Jalda Arriba va cantando el popular
Jalda arriba siempre alegre va riendo
Va cantando porque sabe que vendrá
La confianza que ha de tenerlo contento
Jalda Arriba hacia al futuro marchará
Un futuro de paz y prosperidad
Jalda Arriba va triunfante va subiendo
Jalda Abajo van los de la oposición.

== Leadership ==
=== Party presidents ===
- 1938–1972: Luis Muñoz Marín
- 1972–1976: Rafael Hernández Colón
- 1976–1984: Miguel Hernández Agosto
- 1984–1992: Rafael Hernández Colón
- 1992–1994: Victoria Muñoz Mendoza
- 1994–1997: Héctor Luis Acevedo
- 1997–1999: Aníbal Acevedo Vilá
- 1999–2003: Sila María Calderón
- 2003–2008: Aníbal Acevedo Vilá
- 2008–2011: Héctor Ferrer Ríos
- 2011–2016: Alejandro Garcia Padilla
- 2016–2017: David Bernier
- 2017–2018: Héctor Ferrer Ríos
- 2018–2020: Aníbal José Torres
- 2020–2021: Carlos Delgado Altieri
- 2021–2023: José Luis Dalmau
- 2023–2025: Jesús Manuel Ortiz
- 2025–present : Pablo José Hernández Rivera

=== Gubernatorial nominees ===
- 1948: Luis Muñoz Marín (won)
- 1952: Luis Muñoz Marín (won)
- 1956: Luis Muñoz Marín (won)
- 1960: Luis Muñoz Marín (won)
- 1964: Roberto Sánchez Vilella (won)
- 1968: Luis Negrón López (lost)
- 1972: Rafael Hernández Colón (won)
- 1976: Rafael Hernández Colón (lost)
- 1980: Rafael Hernández Colón (lost)
- 1984: Rafael Hernández Colón (won)
- 1988: Rafael Hernández Colón (won)
- 1992: Victoria Muñoz Mendoza (lost)
- 1996: Héctor Luis Acevedo (lost)
- 2000: Sila María Calderón (won)
- 2004: Aníbal Acevedo Vilá (won)
- 2008: Aníbal Acevedo Vilá (lost)
- 2012: Alejandro Garcia Padilla (won)
- 2016: David Bernier (lost)
- 2020: Carlos Delgado Altieri (lost)
- 2024: Jesús Manuel Ortiz (lost)

=== Other major leaders ===
- Héctor Ferrer Ríos - House Minority Speaker, Party President
- José Luis Dalmau - President of the Senate and Party President
- Felisa Rincón de Gautier - Former San Juan Mayor and party leader
- Antonio Fernós Isern - Party leader and former Resident Commissioner
- Teodoro Moscoso - Party leader and architect of Operation Bootstrap
- Celeste Benítez - Former Secretary of Education and Resident Commissioner candidate in the 1996 elections
- José Aponte de la Torre - Former Party Vice-President and former Carolina Mayor
- Antonio Colorado - Former Secretary of State of Puerto Rico and Resident Commissioner of Puerto Rico from 1990 to 1992. Former candidate for Resident Commissioner of Puerto Rico in the 1992 elections.
- José Enrique Arrarás - Former Representative.
- Aníbal José Torres - Former Chief of Staff, Secretary General of the party, Senator and former president of the party.
- Carmen Yulín Cruz - Former Representative, former Mayor of San Juan, former party Vice President and Precandidate Governor of Puerto Rico.
- Luis Vega Ramos - Former At-Large House Representative, Sovereignty faction leader
- Rafael “Tatito” Hernandez - Speaker House of Representative
- Eduardo Bhatia - Former President of the Senate, Precandidate Governor of Puerto Rico
- Ernesto Ramos Antonini - Former Speaker House of Representative
- Jaime Benítez - Former University of Puerto Rico President and Resident Commissioner
- José Ronaldo "Ronny" Jarabo - Former Speaker House of Representative
- Severo Colberg Ramírez ("El Látigo") - Former Speaker of the House of Representatives
- Benjamin Cole - Former longtime mayor of Mayagüez
- Antonio "Tony" Fas Alzamora - Former President of the Senate ("el del Hacha en el retrato")
- Rafael "Churumba" Cordero Santiago - Former Mayor of Ponce
- William "Willie" Miranda Marín - Former Mayor of Caguas

== See also ==
Ideology

- Liberalism
- Liberalism worldwide
- Liberal democracy
- Contributions to liberal theory
- Autonomy
- Associated state
- Commonwealth
- Sovereignty

Politics

- List of political parties in Puerto Rico
- Politics of Puerto Rico
