= 31st House of Representatives of Puerto Rico =

Lower house of the 19th Legislative Assembly of Puerto Rico

In session
- January 2, 2021 – January 1, 2025

Leadership
- Speaker: Rafael "Tatito" Hernández Montañez
- Speaker pro tem: Conny Varela
- Majority Leader: Angel Matos García
- Majority Whip: Roberto Rivera Ruiz de Porras
- Minority Leaders: Carlos "Johnny" Méndez; Mariana Nogales Molinelli; Denis Márquez Lebrón; Lisie Burgos Muñiz
- Minority Whips: Gabriel Rodríguez Aguiló; José Bernardo Márquez Reyes

Non-officers
- Secretary: Javier Gómez Cruz
- Sergeant-at-Arms: Miguel Arvelo Kuilán

Structure
- Seats: 51 voting members
- Parties represented: 25 PPD; 21 PNP; 2 MVC; 1 PIP; 1 PD; 1 Ind.
- Length of term: 4 years

Elections
- Last election: November 3, 2020
- Next election: November 5, 2024

Legislature
- 19th Legislative Assembly of Puerto Rico

Upper house
- 27th Senate of Puerto Rico

Sessions
- 1st: January 11, 2021 – June 30, 2021
- 2nd: August 16, 2021 – November 16, 2021
- 3rd: January 10, 2022 – June 30, 2022
- 4th: August 15, 2022 – November 15, 2022
- 5th: January 9, 2023 – June 30, 2023
- 6th: August 21, 2023 – November 14, 2023
- 7th: January 8, 2024 – June 30, 2024
- 8th: August 19, 2024* – November 19, 2024*

The 31st House of Representatives of Puerto Rico was the lower house of the 19th Legislative Assembly of Puerto Rico and met from January 2, 2021 to January 1, 2025. All members were elected in the 2020 elections. The House had a majority of elected members from the Popular Democratic Party (PPD), but since 4 May 2022 the PPD only enjoys a plurality.

The body was counterparted by the 27th Senate of Puerto Rico in the upper house.

== Composition ==
=== Leadership ===
PPD PNP PIP MVC PD
Office	Representative	District	Party
Speaker	Tatito Hernández Montañez	District 11	PPD
Speaker pro tem	Conny Varela	District 32	PPD
Majority Leader	Angel Matos García	District 40	PPD
Majority Whip	Roberto Rivera Ruiz de Porras	District 39	PPD
Minority Leader	Johnny Méndez	District 36	PNP
Minority Whip	Gabriel Rodríguez Aguiló	District 13	PNP
Minority Leader	Mariana Nogales Molinelli	At-large	MVC
Minority Whip	José Bernardo Márquez	At-large	MVC
Minority Leader	Denis Márquez Lebrón	At-large	PIP
Minority Leader	Lisie Burgos Muñiz	At-large	PD

=== Non-officers ===
Post	Name
Secretary	Javier Gómez Cruz
Sergeant-at-Arms	Miguel Arvelo Kuilán

=== Members ===
The following is a list of members of the 31st House of Representatives. Néstor A. Alonso Vega resigned from his position after being charged for corruption by federal prosecutors days after the general election, and a special election was held on 21 March 2021 to select his successor from within the New Progressive Party. In addition, while Luis Raúl Torres Cruz was elected under the PPD banner, due to differences with decisions of the party's delegation leadership on policy areas under his purview, on 4 May 2022 Torres Cruz distanced himself from the party, became an independent, and said this move was "final and irrevocable".

PPD PNP PIP MVC PD
District	Name	Political party
District 1	Eddie Charbonier Chinea	PNP
District 2	Luis Raúl Torres Cruz	Ind.
District 3	José Hernández Concepción	PNP
District 4	Víctor L. Parés Otero	PNP
District 5	Jorge "Georgie" Navarro Suárez	PNP
District 6	Ángel Morey Noble	PNP
District 7	Luis Pérez Ortiz	PNP
District 8	Yashira Lebrón Rodríguez	PNP
District 9	Er Yazzer Morales Díaz	PNP
District 10	Deborah Soto Arroyo	PPD
District 11	Rafael «Tatito» Hernández	PPD
District 12	Edgardo Feliciano Sánchez	PPD
District 13	Gabriel Rodríguez Aguiló	PNP
District 14	José O. González Mercado	PNP
District 15	Joel I. Franqui Atiles	PNP
District 16	Eladio J. Cardona Quiles	PPD
District 17	Wilson Román López	PNP
District 18	Jessie Cortés Ramos	PPD
District 19	Jocelyne Rodríguez Negrón	PPD
District 20	Kebin Maldonado Martínez	PPD
District 21	Lydia Méndez Silva	PPD
District 22	Jorge Alfredo Rivera Segarra	PPD
District 23	José H. Rivera Madera	PPD
District 24	Ángel A. Fourquet Cordero	PPD
District 25	Domingo J. Torres García	PPD
District 26	Orlando Aponte Rosario	PPD
District 27	Estrella Martínez Soto	PPD
District 28	Juan J. Santiago Nieves	PPD
District 29	Gretchen Hau	PPD
District 30	Luis «Narmito» Ortiz Lugo	PPD
District 31	Jesús Santa Rodríguez	PPD
District 32	José Manuel «Conny» Varela Fernández	PPD
District 33	Ángel Peña Ramírez	PNP
District 34	Ramón Luis Cruz Burgos	PPD
District 35	Sol Y. Higgins Cuadrado	PPD
District 36	Carlos "Johnny" Méndez	PNP
District 37	Ángel Bulerín	PNP
District 38	Wanda del Valle Correa	PNP
District 39	Roberto Rivera Ruíz	PPD
District 40	Angel Matos García	PPD
At-large	Héctor E. Ferrer Santiago	PPD
At-large	Jesús Manuel Ortiz González	PPD
At-large	José Aponte Hernández	PNP
At-large	José Pichy Torres Zamora	PNP
At-large	José "Quiquito" Meléndez	PNP
At-large	José Pérez Cordero	PNP
At-large	María de Lourdes Ramos Rivera	PNP
At-large	José Bernardo Márquez	MVC
At-large	Mariana Nogales Molinelli	MVC
At-large	Denis Márquez Lebrón	PIP
At-large	Lisie J. Burgos Muñiz	PD

=== Changes in membership ===
- 21 March 2021: José Pérez Cordero is sworn in substitution of fellow New Progressive Néstor A. Alonso Vega, after securing victory a special closed party election.
- 4 May 2022: Luis Raúl Torres Cruz switches from being a Popular Democratic Party representative to Independent due to differences with party leadership.

== Commissions ==
=== Standing commissions ===
Standing Commission Name	President	Vice President	Secretary
Calendars and Special Rules of Debate	Ángel Matos García	Roberto Rivera Ruiz de Porras	José Conny Varela Fernández
Agriculture	Jorge Alfredo Rivera Segarra	Eladio Cardona Quiles	José Rivera Madera
Anti-corruption and Public Integrity	Héctor E. Ferrer Santiago	Deborah Soto Arroyo	Ángel A. Fourquet Cordero
Women's Affairs	Jocelyne M. Rodríguez Negrón	Estrella Martínez Soto	Sol Y. Higgins Cuadrado
Youth Affairs	Héctor Ferrer Santiago	Jocelyne M. Rodríguez Negrón	Juan J. Santiago Nieves
Internal Affairs of the House of Representatives	Roberto Rivera Ruiz de Porras	Luis Raúl Torres Cruz	Deborah Soto Arroyo
Labor Affairs and Pension Reforms	Domingo J. Torres García	José H. Rivera Madera	Deborah Soto Arroyo
Municipal Autonomy, Decentralization, and Regionalization	Juan José Santiago Nieves	Jessie Cortés Ramos	Jocelyn Rodríguez Negrón
Social Welfare, Persons with Disabilities and the Elderly	Lisie J. Burgos Muñiz	Edgardo Feliciano Sánchez	Deborah Soto Arroyo
Economic Development, Planning, Telecommunications, Public-Private Partnerships and Energy	Luis Raúl Torres Cruz	Jesús Santa Rodríguez	Orlando Aponte Rosario
Education, Art and Culture	Deborah Soto Arroyo	Kebin A. Maldonado Martiz	Sol Y. Higgins Cuadrado
Ethics	Ángel Matos García	Ángel A. Fourquet Cordero	Deborah Soto Arroyo
Oversight of Public Funds	Ángel A. Fourquet Cordero	Ramón Luis Cruz Burgos	Juan J. Santiago Nieves
Government	Jesús Manuel Ortiz González	Luis «Narmito» Ortiz Lugo	Luis Raúl Torres Cruz
Finance and Budget	Jesús Santa Rodríguez	Luis Raúl Torres Cruz	Luis «Narmito» Ortiz Lugo
Community Impact	Lydia Méndez Silva	Sol Y. Higgins Cuadrado	Jocelyne M. Rodríguez Negrón
Judiciary	Rafael "Tatito" Hernández Montañez (interim)	Ángel Fourquet Cordero	Jesús Manuel Ortiz González
Small and Medium Enterprises and Permits	Jessie Cortés Ramos	José H. Rivera Madera	Domingo J. Torres García
Sports and Recreation	Eladio J. Cardona Sánchez	Jocelyne M. Rodríguez Negrón	Estrella Martínez Soto
Natural Resources, Environmental Affairs, and Recycling	Edgardo Feliciano Sánchez	Kebin A. Maldonado Martiz	Héctor E. Ferrer Santiago
Federal, International, Status, and Veterans Relations	Kebin A. Maldonado Martiz	Juan J. Santiago Nieves	Jesús Santa Rodríguez
Health	Sol Y. Higgins Cuadrado	Luis Raúl Torres Cruz	Kebin A. Maldonado Martiz
Public Security, Science and Technology	Luis «Narmito» Ortiz Lugo	José A. Díaz Collazo	Jesús M. Ortiz González
Transportation, Infrastructure, and Public Works	José A. Díaz Collazo	Luis «Narmito» Ortiz Lugo	Jesús Santa Rodríguez
Cooperatives and Tourism	José H. Rivera Madera	Héctor E. Ferrer Santiago	Edgardo Feliciano Sánchez
Housing and Urban Development	Ángel Fourquet Cordero	Domingo Torres García	José H. Rivera Madera
Development and Oversight of Public Funds for the Capital City, Aguas Buenas, Bayamón, Cataño and Guaynabo	Luis Raúl Torres Cruz	Héctor E. Ferrer Santiago	Jesús M. Ortiz González
Oversight of Development Funds for the East Region	Angel R. Peña Ramírez	Sol Y. Higgins Cuadrado	Luis «Narmito» Ortiz Lugo
Oversight of Development Funds for the Northeast Region	Ángel Matos García	Sol Y. Higgins Cuadrado	Héctor E. Ferrer Santiago
Oversight of Development Funds for the Northwest Region	José O. González Mercado	Jessie Cortés Ramos	Eladio J. Cardona Sánchez
Oversight of Development Funds for the North Region	Edgardo Feliciano Sánchez	Deborah Soto Arroyo	Juan J. Santiago Nieves
Oversight of Development Funds for the West Region	Jocelyn Rodríguez Negrón	Kebin A. Maldonado Martiz	Jessie Cortés Ramos
Oversight of Development Funds for the South Central Region	Estrella Martínez Soto	Jorge A. Rivera Segarra	Orlando Aponte Rosario
Oversight of Development Funds for the Southeast Region	Luis «Narmito» Ortiz Lugo	José A. Díaz Collazo	Ramón Luis Cruz Burgos
Oversight of Development Funds for the Southwest Region	Ángel A. Fourquet Lamb	José H. Rivera Madera	Kebin A. Maldonado Martiz
Constitutional Amendments and Electoral Law	José «Conny» Varela Fernández	Jesús M. Ortiz González	Orlando Aponte Rosario
Emergency Preparedness, Reconstruction and Reorganization	Luis «Narmito» Ortiz Lugo	José A. Díaz Collazo	Ramón Luis Cruz Burgos
Consumer Rights, Banking Services and Insurance Industry	Estrella Martínez Soto	Orlando Aponte Rosario	José H. Rivera Madera

=== Joint commissions ===
Name	President	Vice President	Secretary
Review and Implementation of Administrative Regulations	Tatito Hernández Montañez	Jesús Santa Rodríguez	José «Conny» Varela Fernández
Continuous Revision of the Penal Code and for the Reform of Criminal Laws	Orlando Aponte Rosario	Ángel A. Fourquet Cordero	Jesús M. Ortiz González
Revision and Reform of the Civil Code	Orlando Aponte Rosario	Ángel A. Fourquet Cordero	Jesús M. Ortiz González
Mitigation, Adaptation and Resilience to Climate Change	Edgardo Feliciano Sánchez	Kebin Maldonado Martiz	Héctor Ferrer Santiago
Legislative Funding for Community Impact	Jesús Santa Rodríguez	Ángel A. Fourquet Cordero	Juan J. Santiago Nieves
Public-Private Partnerships of Puerto Rico	Luis Raúl Torres Cruz	Jesús Santa Rodríguez	Orlando Aponte Rosario
Special Reports from the Comptroller	Tatito Hernández Montañez	Roberto Rivera Ruiz de Porras	Domingo J. Torres García
Córdova y Fernós Program of Congressional Internships	Héctor Ferrer Santiago	Deborah Soto Arroyo	Ángel A. Fourquet Cordero
Pilar Barbosa Program of Education Internships	Deborah Soto Arroyo	Kebin A. Maldonado Martiz	Lydia Méndez Silva
Jorge A. Ramos Comas Legislative Internship Program	Héctor Ferrer Santiago	Angel Matos García	Lisie J. Burgos Muñiz

=== Changes in leadership ===
- 15 November 2022: Orlando Aponte Rosario is removed from the Presidency of the Judiciary Committee by Speaker Rafael "Tatito" Hernández Montañez. Hernández Montañez will be interim president of the committee.
