= 32nd House of Representatives of Puerto Rico =

In session
- January 2, 2025 – January 1, 2029

Leadership
- Speaker: Carlos Johnny Méndez
- Speaker pro tem: Yashira Lebrón Rodríguez; Ángel Peña Ramírez
- Majority Leader: José Torres Zamora
- Majority Whip: Wilson Román López
- Minority Leaders: Héctor Ferrer Santiago; Denis Márquez Lebrón; Lisie Burgos Muñiz
- Minority Whips: Domingo Torres García; Adrianna Gutiérrez Colón

Structure
- Seats: 53 voting members
- Parties represented: 36 PNP; 13 PPD; 3 PIP; 1 PD
- Length of term: 4 years

Elections
- Last election: November 5, 2024
- Next election: November 7, 2028

Legislature
- 20th Legislative Assembly of Puerto Rico

Upper house
- 28th Senate of Puerto Rico

The 32nd House of Representatives of Puerto Rico is the current session of the House of Representatives of Puerto Rico, and the lower house of the 20th Legislative Assembly of Puerto Rico. The 32nd House of Representatives convened on January 2, 2025, and will adjourn on January 1, 2029.

== Composition ==
=== Leadership ===
PPD PNP PIP PD
Office	Representative	District	Party
Speaker	Johnny Méndez	District 36	PNP
Speaker pro tem	Yashira Lebrón Rodríguez	District 8	PNP
Speaker pro tem	Angel Peña Ramírez	District 33	PNP
Majority Leader	José Torres Zamora	At-large	PNP
Majority Whip	Wilson Román López	District 17	PNP
Minority Leader	Héctor Ferrer Santiago	At-large	PPD
Minority Whip	Domingo Torres García	District 25	PPD
Minority Leader	Denis Márquez Lebrón	At-large	PIP
Minority Whip	Adriana Gutiérrez Colón	At-large	PIP
Minority Leader	Lisie Burgos Muñiz	At-large	PD

=== Members ===
PPD PNP PIP PD
District	Name	Party
1	Eddie Charbonier Chinea	PNP
2	Ricardo Rey Ocasio Ramos	PNP
3	José Hernández Concepción	PNP
4	Víctor Parés	PNP
5	Jorge Navarro Suárez	PNP
6	Ángel Morey Noble	PNP
7	Luis Pérez Ortiz	PNP
8	Yashira Lebrón Rodríguez	PNP
9	Félix Pacheco Burgos	PNP
10	Pedro Santiago Guzmán	PNP
11	Elinette González Aguayo	PNP
12	Edgardo Feliciano Sánchez	PPD
13	Jerry Nieves Rosario	PNP
14	Edgar Robles Rivera	PNP
15	Joel I. Franqui Atiles	PNP
16	Reinaldo Figueroa	PPD
17	Wilson Román López	PNP
18	Odalys González González	PNP
19	Lilibeth Rosas	PPD
20	Emilio Carlo Acosta	PNP
21	Omayra Martínez Vázquez	PNP
22	Joe Colón Rodríguez	PNP
23	Ensol Rodríguez Torres	PNP
24	Ángel A. Fourquet Cordero	PPD
25	Domingo J. Torres García	PPD
26	Luis Jiménez Torres	PNP
27	Estrella Martínez Soto	PPD
28	Axel Roque	PNP
29	Gretchen Hau	PPD
30	Fernando Sanabria Colón	PNP
31	Roberto López Román	PNP
32	Conny Varela	PPD
33	Ángel Peña Ramírez	PNP
34	Christian Muriel Sánchez	PNP
35	Sol Y. Higgins Cuadrado	PPD
36	Johnny Méndez	PNP
37	Camen Medina Calderón	PNP
38	Wanda del Valle Correa	PNP
39	Roberto Rivera Ruíz	PPD
40	Sergio Estévez Vélez	PNP
At-large	José Pichy Torres Zamora	PNP
At-large	Tatiana Pérez Ramírez	PNP
At-large	José Pérez Cordero	PNP
At-large	Gabriel Rodríguez Aguiló	PNP
At-large	María de Lourdes Ramos Rivera	PNP
At-large	José Aponte Hernández	PNP
At-large	Héctor Ferrer Santiago	PPD
At-large	Swanny Vargas Laureano	PPD
At-large	Ramón Torres Cruz	PPD
At-large	Denis Márquez Lebrón	PIP
At-large	Adriana Gutiérrez Colón	PIP
At-large	Nelie Lebrón Robles	PIP
At-large	Lisie Burgos Muñiz	PD
