= 19th Legislative Assembly of Puerto Rico =

Session of the Puerto Rico Legislature

| ← | 18th | 20th | → |
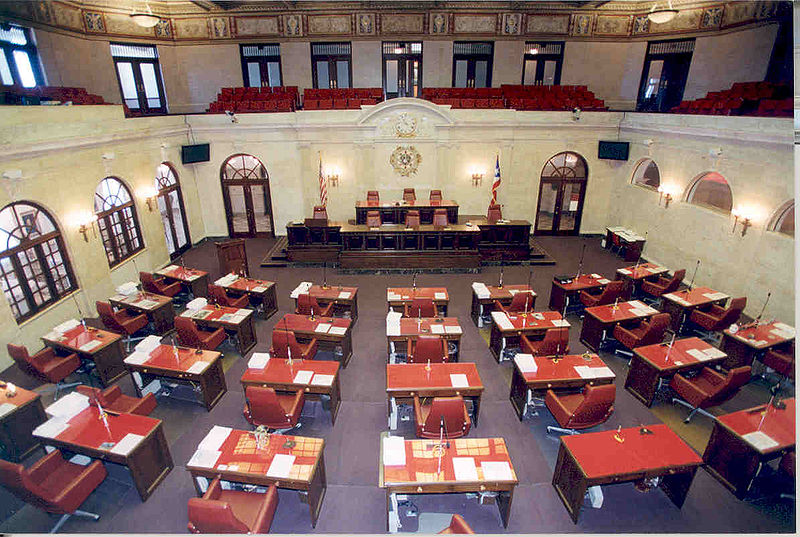

Overview
- Legislative body: Legislative Assembly of Puerto Rico
- Term: January 2, 2021 – January 1, 2025
- Election: 8 November 2020: Senate; House
- Government: Pierluisi government

27th Senate
- Members: 27
- President: José Luis Dalmau
- President pro tem: Marially González Huertas
- Majority Leader: Javier Aponte Dalmau
- Majority Whip: Gretchen Marie Hau Irizarry
- Minority Leaders: Thomas Rivera Schatz (PNP), Ana Irma Rivera Lassén (MVC), M.ª de Lourdes Santiago Negrón (PIP), Joanne Rodríguez Veve (PD), José "Chaco" Vargas Vidot (Ind.)
- Minority Whips: Carmelo Ríos Santiago (PNP),Rafael Bernabe Riefkohl (MVC)

29th House of Representatives
- Members: 51
- Speaker: Tatito Hernández Montañez
- Speaker pro tem: Conny Varela
- Majority Leader: Angel Matos García
- Majority Whip: Roberto Rivera Ruiz de Porras
- Minority Leaders: Carlos Johnny Méndez (PNP), Mariana Nogales Molinelli (MVC), Denis Márquez Lebrón (PIP), Lisie Burgos Muñiz (PD)
- Minority Whips: Gabriel Rodríguez Aguiló (PNP), José Bernardo Márquez Reyes (MVC)

Sessions
- 1st: January 11, 2021 – June 30, 2021
- 2nd: August 16, 2021 – November 16, 2021
- 3rd: January 10, 2022 – June 30, 2022
- 4th: August 15, 2022 – November 15, 2022
- 5th: January 9, 2023 – June 30, 2023
- 6th: August 21, 2023 – November 14, 2023
- 7th: January 8, 2024 – June 30, 2024
- 8th: August 19, 2024* – November 19, 2024*

The 19th Legislative Assembly of Puerto Rico met from January 2, 2021, to January 1, 2025. Members of the 31st House of Representatives of Puerto Rico were elected in the 2020 House of Representatives election, while members of the 27th Senate of Puerto Rico were elected the same day in the Senate election. The Popular Democratic Party (PPD in Spanish) does not have an outright majority in the Senate, but controls the chamber. While the PPD had a simple majority of representatives in the 31st House of Representatives from 2021 to 2022, this has ceased to be the case since 4 May 2022.

== Major legislation ==
The following is a non-extensive list of legislation with far-reaching impact in Puerto Rican society approved by the 19th Legislative Assembly. For an extensive list of all legislation approved in this legislature see List of acts of the 19th Legislative Assembly of Puerto Rico.

=== Enacted ===
- Law 10 of 2022: Special Law for the Minimum Salary of Teachers in the Public Education System. Increased the minimum salary for teachers to $2,750 monthly.
- Law 47 of 2021: Puerto Rico Minimum Wage Act. The law increased the minimum wage from 7.25 to $10.50 per hour (or higher) by 1 July 2024; allows Puerto Rico’s minimum wage to prevail over the federal minimum wage if Puerto Rico's is higher; created the Minimum Wage Review Commission within the Department of Labor and Human Resources which will review and increase the minimum wage yearly via decrees; and provided employees of local businesses not covered by the Fair Labor Standards Act of 1938 with protections.
- Law 7 of 2021: Dignified Retirement Act. Declares a state of emergency for the government of Puerto Rico and its pension systems, proposes a model to manage creditors' classes under a Plan of Adjustment of Puerto Rico's public debts, setting a goal for zero pension cuts, as well as rejecting prima facie any Plan of Adjustment or Restructuring Support Agreement proposed by the Financial Oversight and Management Board for Puerto Rico that requires the cutting of essential public services by the central government and public corporations or the municipalities.

=== Proposed ===
- Senate Bill 693: Law for the Protection of the Conceived in its Gestational Stage of Viability. Would remove or restrict medical exemptions from the abortion section of the Puerto Rico penal code as recognized in Pueblo de Puerto Rico v. Pablo Duarte Mendoza (1980). The Senate approved it on 21 June 2022, by a vote of 16 for, 9 against, one abstained and one absent. It has been referred to the House of Representatives, and awaits consideration.
- House Bill 1037: To amend Section 404 (a) of the Puerto Rico Controlled Substances Act, Act No. 4 of 23 June 1971, as amended, for the purpose of decriminalizing the simple possession of fourteen (14) grams or less of marijuana. Would have decriminalized possession of small amounts of marijuana. Puerto Rico currently allows medical marijuana use and sales, but not recreational marijuana use. Failed to pass in the House of Representatives on 1 November 2022, by a vote of 19 for, 26 against, 2 abstained, 3 absent.

== Leadership ==
=== Senate ===
| Office | Senator | Party | District |
|---|---|---|---|
| President | José Luis Dalmau Santiago | PPD | District VII |
| Vice President | Marially González Huertas | PPD | District V |
| Majority Leader | Javier Antonio Aponte Dalmau | PPD | District VIII |
| Minority Leaders | Thomas Rivera Schatz | PNP | At-large |
| Minority Leaders | María de Lourdes Santiago Negrón | PIP | At-large |
| Minority Leaders | Ana Irma Rivera Lassén | MVC | At-large |
| Minority Leaders | Joanne Rodríguez Veve | PD | At-large |

=== House of Representatives ===
| Office | Representative | Party | District |
|---|---|---|---|
| Speaker of the House | Tatito Hernández Montañez | PPD | District 11 |
| Speaker Pro Tem | Conny Varela | PPD | District 32 |
| Majority Leader | Angel Matos García | PPD | District 40 |
| Minority Leaders | Johnny Méndez | PNP | District 36 |
| Minority Leaders | Mariana Nogales Molinelli | MVC | At-large |
| Minority Leaders | Denis Márquez Lebrón | PIP | At-large |
| Minority Leaders | Lisie Burgos Muñiz | PD | At-large |

== Party summary ==
Resignations and new members are discussed in the "Changes in membership" section below.

=== Senate ===
Senate membership

Begin (from January 2, 2021)

| Affiliation | Party (shading indicates control of presidency and leadership of the chamber) | | | | | | Total | Vacant |
| Affiliation | Popular Democratic | Citizen Victory | Independence | Independent | Project Dignity | New Progressive | Total | Vacant |
|---|---|---|---|---|---|---|---|---|
| End of previous Legislature | 7 | 0 | 1 | 1 | 0 | 21 | 30 | 0 |
| Begin (2 January 2021) | 12 | 2 | 1 | 1 | 1 | 10 | 27 | 0 |
| 30 June 2022 | 12 | 2 | 1 | 1 | 1 | 9 | 26 | 1 |
| 11 September 2022 | 12 | 2 | 1 | 1 | 1 | 10 | 27 | 0 |
| Latest voting share | 44.4% | 7.4% | 3.7% | 3.7% | 3.7% | 37.0% | | |

=== House of Representatives ===
House membership

Current (from 4 May 2022)

(21 March 2021 - 4 May 2022)

(11 January 2021 - 21 March 2021)

Begin 2 January 2021 – 11 January 2021

| Affiliation | Party (shading indicates control of presidency and leadership of the chamber) | | | | | | Total | Vacant |
| Affiliation | Popular Democratic | Citizen Victory | Independence | Independent | Project Dignity | New Progressive | Total | Vacant |
|---|---|---|---|---|---|---|---|---|
| End of previous Legislature | 16 | 1 | 1 | 0 | 0 | 34 | 51 | 0 |
| Begin (2 January 2022) | 26 | 2 | 1 | 0 | 1 | 21 | 51 | 0 |
| 11 January 2021 (Note: In At-Large seat: Néstor A. Alonso Vega (PNP) resigned on 11 January 2021 as he was charged with corruption. His successor, José Pérez Cordero was elected on 21 March 2021.) | 26 | 2 | 1 | 0 | 1 | 20 | 50 | 1 |
| 21 March 2021 | 26 | 2 | 1 | 0 | 1 | 21 | 51 | 0 |
| 4 May 2022 (Note: In District 2: Luis Raúl Torres Cruz (PPD) broke from the party caucus and declared himself independent on 4 May 2022.) | 25 | 2 | 1 | 1 | 1 | 21 | 51 | 0 |
| 11 September 2022 (Note: In San Juan District 3 seat: Juan Oscar Morales Rodríguez (PNP) became Senator, leaving a vacancy that was filled in a special election in December.) | 25 | 2 | 1 | 1 | 1 | 20 | 50 | 1 |
| 6 December | 25 | 2 | 1 | 1 | 1 | 21 | 51 | 0 |
| Latest voting share | 49.0% | 3.9% | 2.0% | 2.0% | 2.0% | 41.2% | | |

== Changes in membership ==
=== Senate ===
| District | Vacated by | Reason for change | Successor | Date of successor's installation |
|---|---|---|---|---|
| I - San Juan | Henry Neumann | Resigned, effective on 30 June 2022; A special election was held on 11 September 2022 | Juan Oscar Morales Rodríguez | 11 September 2022 |

=== House of Representatives ===
| District | Vacated by | Reason for change | Successor | Date of successor's installation |
|---|---|---|---|---|
| 2 | Luis Raúl Torres | Changed party, 4 May 2022 | Luis Raúl Torres | 4 May 2022 |
| 3 | Juan Oscar Morales Rodríguez | Became senator, vacating House seat, Vacancy filled in special election in December. | José Hernández Concepción. | 6 December 2022 |
| At-large | Néstor A. Alonso Vega | Resigned upon being charged on 11 January 2021. A special election was held on 21 March 2021. | José «Che» Pérez Cordero. | 21 March 2021 |

== See also ==
- List of Legislative Assemblies of Puerto Rico
