= 2024 Puerto Rico House of Representatives election =

2024 Puerto Rico House of Representatives elections
- November 5, 2024

All 51 seats in the House of Representatives 26 seats needed for a majority
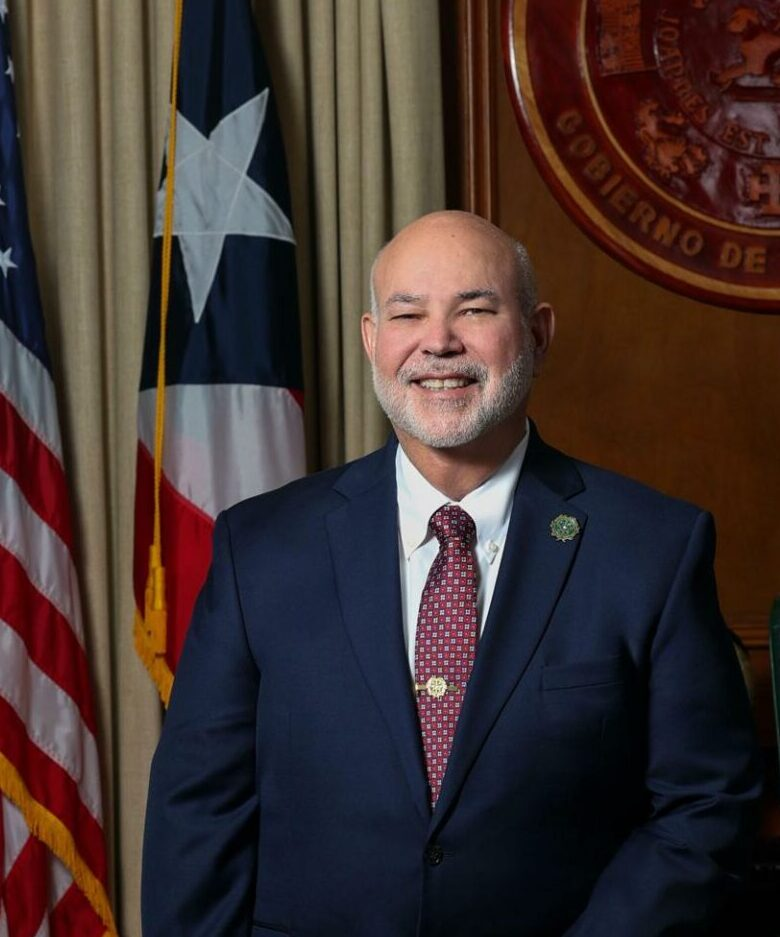

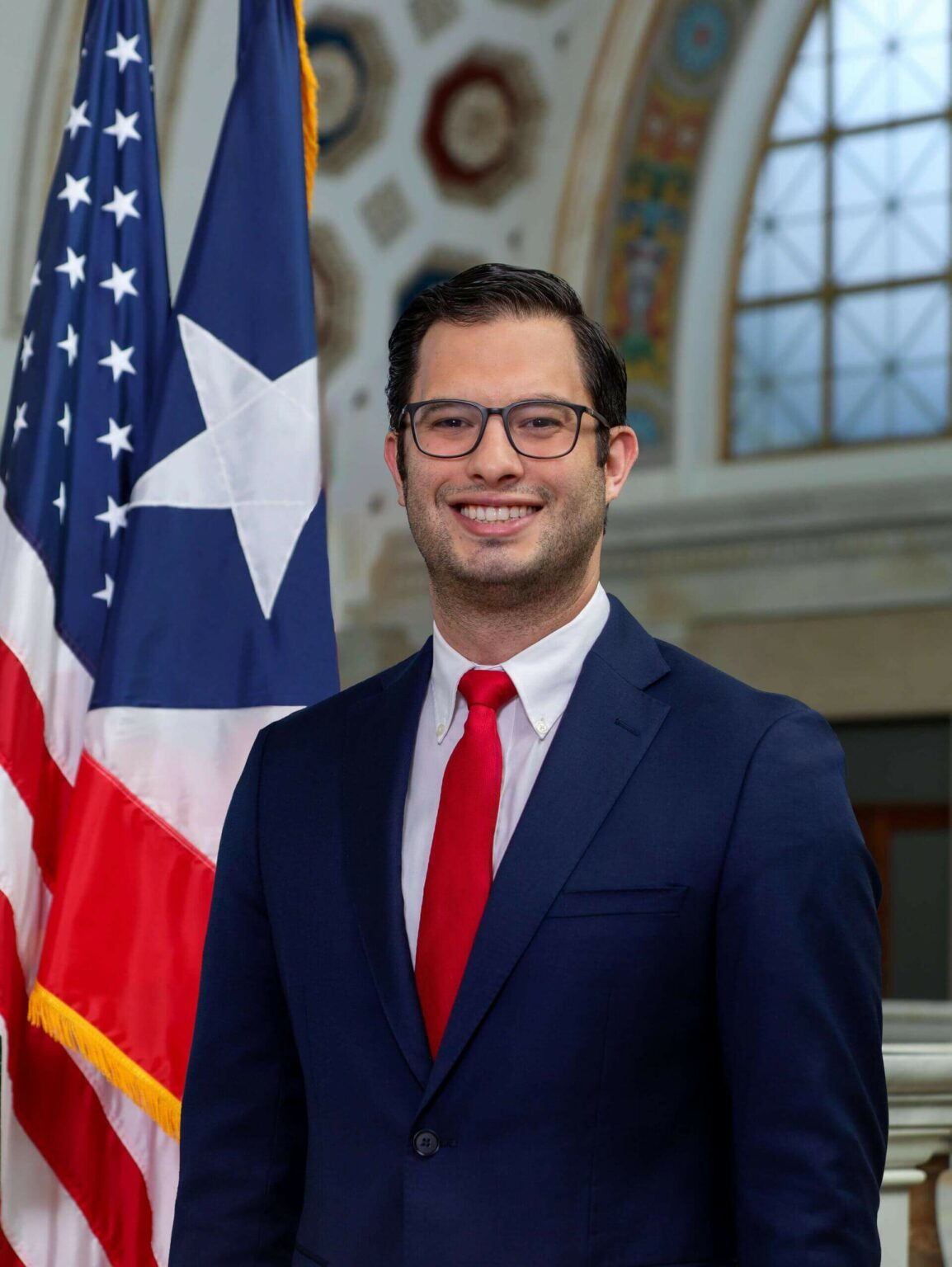

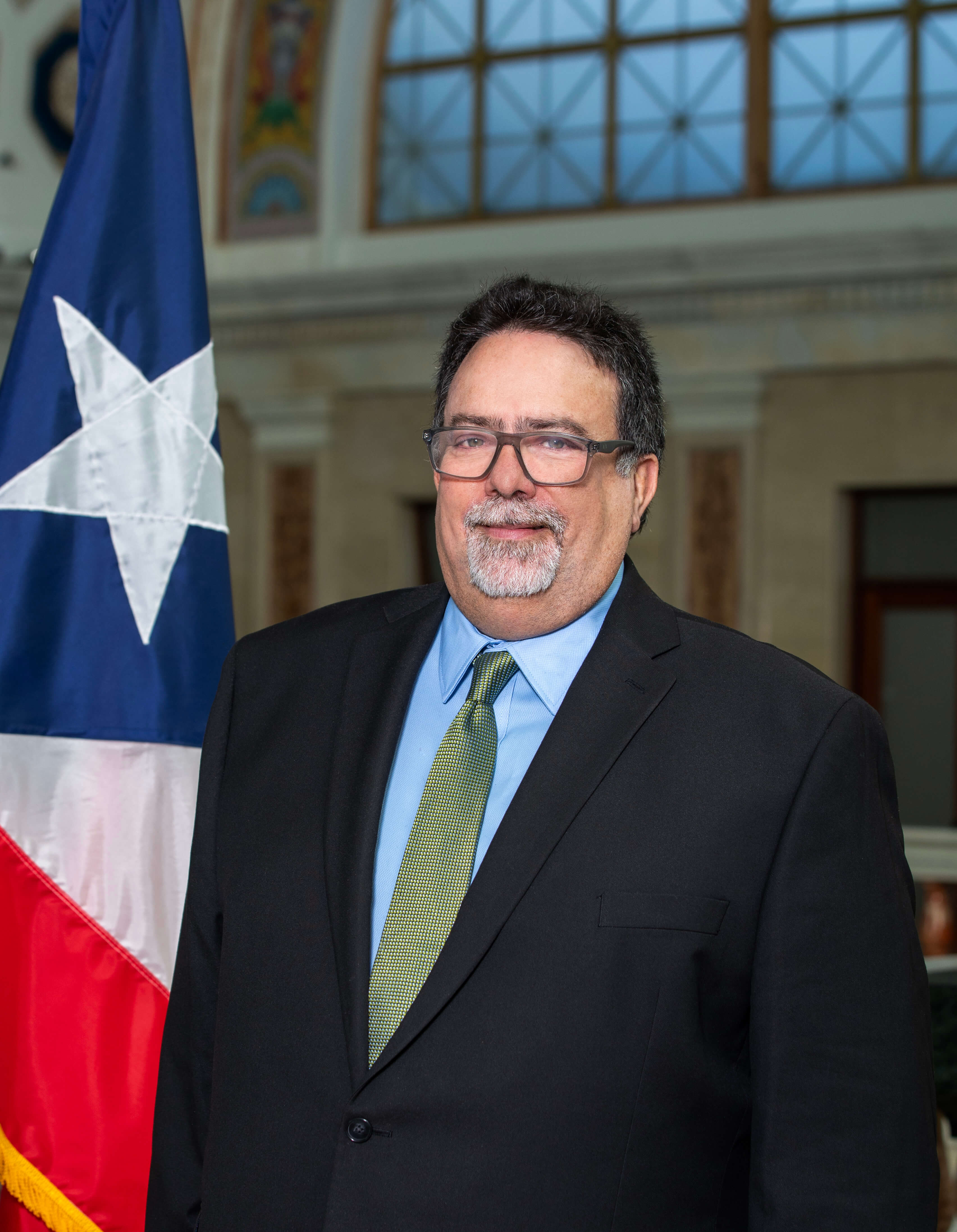

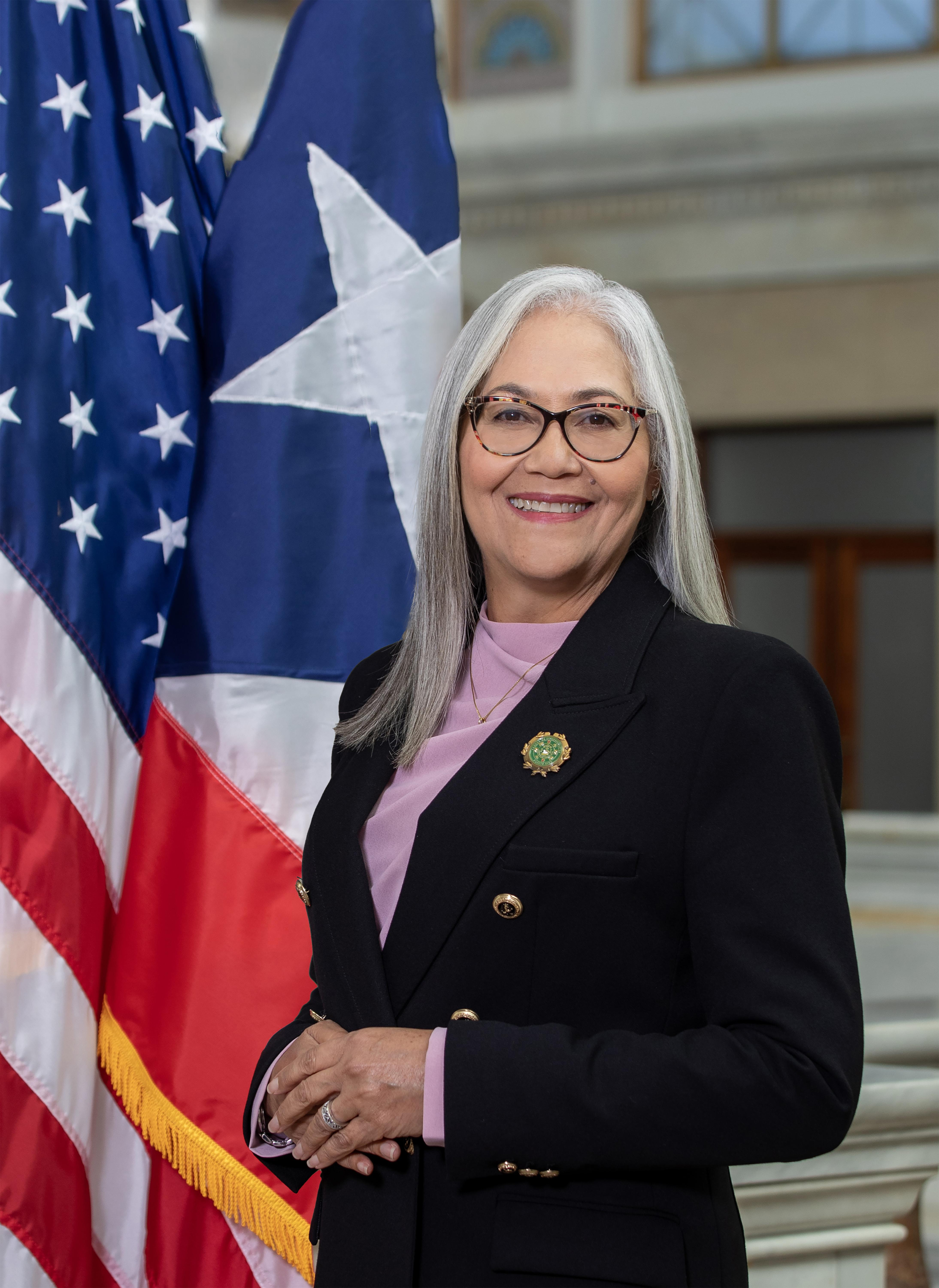

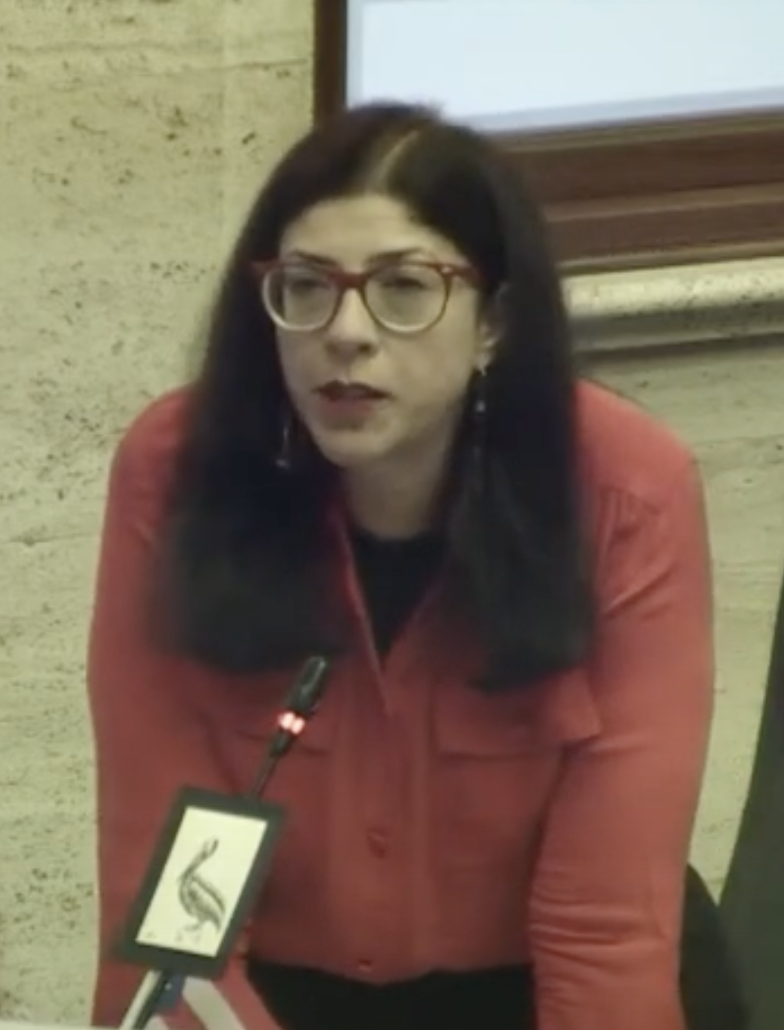

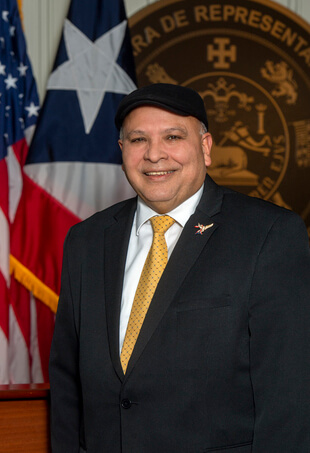
	Majority party	Minority party	Third party
Leader	Carlos Méndez Núñez	Héctor Ferrer Santiago	Denis Márquez Lebrón
Party	New Progressive	Popular Democratic	Independence
Leader since	January 2, 2025	January 2, 2025	January 2, 2017
Seats before	21	25	1
Seats after	36	13	3
Seat change	▲15	▼12	▲2
	Fourth party	Fifth party	Sixth party
Leader	Lisie Burgos Muñiz	Mariana Nogales Molinelli	Luis Raúl Torres Cruz
Party	Project Dignity	Citizens' Victory	Independent
Leader since	January 2, 2021	January 2, 2021	May 4, 2022
Seats before	1	2	1
Seats after	1	0	0
Seat change	Steady	▼2	▼1
Speaker of the House before election
Tatito Hernández
Popular Democratic
Elected Speaker of the House
Carlos Méndez Núnez
New Progressive

The 2024 Puerto Rico House of Representatives election was held on November 5, 2024, to elect the members of the 32nd House of Representatives of Puerto Rico, concurrently with the election of the Governor, the Resident Commissioner, the Senate, and the mayors of the 78 municipalities, as well as the election events of a status referendum and a presidential straw poll. As candidates in the 2024 general elections, the winners were elected to serve a four-year term from January 2, 2025 to January 2, 2029.

== Summary ==
167 candidates are running for representative:

- New Progressive Party (PNP) had 46 candidates, 20 of whom were incumbent.
- Popular Democratic Party (PPD) had 44 candidates, 19 of whom were incumbent.
- Puerto Rican Independence Party (PIP) had 27 candidates, 1 of whom was incumbent.
- Citizen's Victory Movement (MVC) had 20 candidates, none of whom were incumbent.
- Project Dignity (PD) had 29 candidates, 1 of whom is incumbent.
- 1 candidate was independent and was incumbent.

== House of Representatives composition ==
31st House of Representatives (2021–2025)

PPD_{1}	PPD_{2}	PPD_{3}	PPD_{4}	PPD_{5}	PPD_{6}	PPD_{7}	PPD_{8}	PPD_{9}	PPD_{10}	PPD_{11}
PPD_{12}	PPD_{13}	PPD_{14}	PPD_{15}	PPD_{16}	PPD_{17}	PPD_{18}	PPD_{19}	PPD_{20}	PPD_{21}	PPD_{22}
PPD_{23}	PPD_{24}	PPD_{25}	PNP_{1}	PNP_{2}	PNP_{3}	PNP_{4}	PNP_{5}	PNP_{6}	PNP_{7}	PNP_{8}
PNP_{9}	PNP_{10}	PNP_{11}	PNP_{12}	PNP_{13}	PNP_{14}	PNP_{15}	PNP_{16}	PNP_{17}	PNP_{18}	PNP_{19}
PNP_{20}	PNP_{21}	MVC_{1}	MVC_{2}	PIP_{1}	PD_{1}	IND_{1} (Note: Originally elected under the Popular Democratic Party (PPD))				

32nd House of Representatives (2025–2029)

PNP_{1}	PNP_{2}	PNP_{3}	PNP_{4}	PNP_{5}	PNP_{6}	PNP_{7}	PNP_{8}	PNP_{9}	PNP_{10}	PNP_{11}
PNP_{12}	PNP_{13}	PNP_{14}	PNP_{15}	PNP_{16}	PNP_{17}	PNP_{18}	PNP_{19}	PNP_{20}	PNP_{21}	PNP_{22}
PNP_{23}	PNP_{24}	PNP_{25}	PNP_{26}	PNP_{27}	PNP_{28}	PNP_{29}	PNP_{30}	PNP_{31}	PNP_{32}	PNP_{33}
PNP_{34}	PNP_{35}	PNP_{36}	PPD_{1}	PPD_{2}	PPD_{3}	PPD_{4}	PPD_{5}	PPD_{6}	PPD_{7}	PPD_{8}
PPD_{9}	PPD_{10}	PPD_{11}	PPD_{12}	PPD_{13}	PIP_{1}	PIP_{2} (Note: Per Section 7, Article III of the Constitution of Puerto Rico, if a party wins a two-thirds majority (34 out of 51 seats) or more in the House of Representatives, seats equal to the number of seats over the 34-seat threshold must be added to preserve the participation and representation of minority parties. Since the New Progressive Party (PNP) exceeded the threshold by two seats, the Puerto Rican Independence Party (PIP) was awarded two seats, selecting the candidates with the highest vote share won at-large or in a district.)	PIP_{3}	PD_{1}		

== Results ==
The final results of the 2024 Puerto Rico House of Representatives election were certified on December 31, 2024, by the Puerto Rico State Commission (CEE).

=== Summary ===
Parties	District			At-large			Total seats	Composition	±%
Parties	Votes	%	Seats	Votes	%	Seats	Total seats	Composition	±%
New Progressive Party (PNP)	498,434	42.8	30	463,931	36.5	6	36	36 / 51	+15
Popular Democratic Party (PPD)	411,374	35.4	10	388,352	30.5	3	13	13 / 51	-12
Puerto Rican Independence Party (PIP)	112,652	9.7	0	192,404	15.1	1	1	1 / 51	–
Project Dignity (PD)	67,757	5.8	0	84,796	6.7	1	1	1 / 51	–
Citizen's Victory Movement (MVC)	73,061	6.3	0	0	0.0	0	0	0 / 51	-2
Independents	0	0	0	12,910	1.0	0	0	0 / 51	-1
Total	1,163,278	100.00	40	1,271,361	100.00	11	51		

Left-of-center parties PIP and MVC formed an electoral alliance for the 2024 elections, called the Alianza de País. They agreed to not compete against each other, except when legally required (as in the gubernatorial and Resident Commissioner election).

=== At-large ===
2024 Puerto Rico At-Large Representative election
Party	Candidate	Votes	%	±%
Independence	Denis Márquez Lebrón (incumbent) (Note: Part of the Alianza de País)	192,404	15.1	+4.5
Popular Democratic	Héctor E. Ferrer Santiago (incumbent)	169,060	13.3	+1.7
New Progressive	José Pichy Torres Zamora (incumbent)	87,511	6.9	+0.2
Project Dignity	Lisie J. Burgos Muñiz (incumbent)	84,976	6.7	−0.2
New Progressive	Tatiana Pérez Ramirez	76,949	6.1	n/a
New Progressive	José J. Pérez Cordero (incumbent) (Note: Incumbent from District 18)	76,918	6.1	n/a
Popular Democratic	Swanny E. Vargas Laureano	75,770	6.0	n/a
New Progressive	Gabriel Rodríguez Aguiló	74,925	5.9	n/a
New Progressive	María de Lourdes Ramos Rivera (incumbent)	74,836	5.9	+0.8
Popular Democratic	Ramón A. Torres Cruz	72,856	5.7	n/a
New Progressive	José Aponte Hernández (incumbent)	72,792	5.7	+0.2
Popular Democratic	Gabriel J. López Arrieta	70,666	5.6	+1.4
Independent	Luis Raúl Torres Cruz (incumbent) (Note: Incumbent from District 2)	12,910	1.0	n/a
Write-in		29,994	2.5	n/a
Total votes		1,271,361	100.00%	
Independence hold				
Popular Democratic hold				
New Progressive hold				
Project Dignity hold				
New Progressive hold				
New Progressive hold				
Popular Democratic hold				
New Progressive hold				
New Progressive hold				
Popular Democratic gain from Citizens' Victory				
New Progressive gain from Citizens' Victory				

The Popular Democratic Party decided to nominated 4 candidates instead of 6 candidates like they normally do, citing that this would help them win more overall At-large seats. Although the Citizen's Victory Movement originally planned to have 2 at-large candidates, these being incumbent senator Rafael Bernabe Riefkohl and newcomer Alejandro Santiago Calderón, their candidacies were invalidated by the Supreme Court for not having collected the necessary endorsements required by law.

=== District Representatives ===
==== District 1 ====
2024 Puerto Rico Representative District 1 election
Party	Candidate	Votes	%	±%
New Progressive	Eddie Charbonier Chinea (incumbent)	10,961	46.0	+3.4
Citizens' Victory	Pedro Cardona Roig (El Urbanista)	7,889	33.1	+9.1
Popular Democratic	Ana (Ginny) Piñero Parés	4,202	17.6	−5.1
Project Dignity	Antonio Santos	792	3.3	n/a
Total votes		23,844	100.0	
New Progressive hold				

==== District 2 ====
2024 Puerto Rico Representative District 2 election
Party	Candidate	Votes	%	±%
New Progressive	Ricardo Chino Rey Ocasio Ramos	8,755	36.3	+5.4
Citizens' Victory	Joel Vázquez Rosario	8,314	34.5	+10.2
Popular Democratic	Bryan Saavedra	5,772	23.9	−7.6
Project Dignity	Juan Gabriel Zayas Monge	1,273	5.3	n/a
Total votes		24,114	100.0	
New Progressive gain from Popular Democratic				

On May 4, 2022, incumbent representative Luis R. Torres Cruz announced that he was unaffiliating himself from the Popular Democratic Party, which he had been a part of since 1995. Later, on December 1, 2023, he announced that he would not seek reelection in the district 2 seat which he has held since 2001, instead choosing to run for an At-Large seat.

==== District 3 ====
2024 Puerto Rico Representative District 3 election
Party	Candidate	Votes	%	±%
New Progressive	José Hernández Concepción (incumbent)	9,797	41.9	+10.4
Citizens' Victory	Eva Prados Rodríguez	9,085	38.8	+4.2
Popular Democratic	Cristofer Malespín	4,511	19.3	−4.8
Total votes		23,393	100.0	
New Progressive hold				

On June 11, 2022, PNP San Juan I district senator Henry Neumann Zayas announced that he would be stepping down from his post for personal reasons. To fill the senate seat, on September 11 of that year, the New Progressive Party held a special election, where incumbent representative Juan O. Morales Rodríguez ran and won the seat, leaving the District 3 representative seat open. That meant that the representative seat had to be filled, which was done later on December 6, where José A. Hernández Concepción won the special election.

==== District 4 ====
2024 Puerto Rico Representative District 4 election
Party	Candidate	Votes	%	±%
New Progressive	Víctor Parés (incumbent)	11,210	35.1	+1.9
Independence	Adriana Gutiérrez Colón	10,866	34.1	+21.3
Popular Democratic	Manuel Calderón Cerame	8,228	25.8	−5.6
Project Dignity	Rosalina Valcárcel Ruiz	1,591	5.0	N/A
Total votes		31,895	100.0	
New Progressive hold				

==== District 5 ====
2024 Puerto Rico Representative District 5 election
Party	Candidate	Votes	%	±%
New Progressive	Jorge Navarro Suárez (incumbent)	14,748	48.1	+12.9
Independence	Gabriel Casal Nazario	6,980	22.8	+13.9
Popular Democratic	Elba Beatriz Rivera	6,646	21.7	−5.6
Project Dignity	Ricardo Rodríguez Quiles	2,302	7.5	−0.7
Total votes		30,676	100.0	
New Progressive hold				

==== District 6 ====
2024 Puerto Rico Representative District 6 election
Party	Candidate	Votes	%	±%
New Progressive	Ángel Morey Noble (incumbent)	14,006	49.7	+4.8
Citizens' Victory	Effie Alexandra Acevedo Guasp	6,094	22.4	+1.0
Popular Democratic	Magdiel Colón	5,655	20.1	−1.0
Project Dignity	Ricky Aponte	2,418	8.6%	n/a
Total votes		28,173	100.0	
New Progressive hold				

Incumbent representative Ángel Morey Noble won the PNP primary.

==== District 7 ====
2024 Puerto Rico Representative District 7 election
Party	Candidate	Votes	%	±%
New Progressive	Luis Pérez Ortíz (incumbent)	11,889	46.2	+4.2
Popular Democratic	Zabdiel Rodríguez Nieves	5,785	22.5	−4.5
Independence	Marisel Álvarez Feliciano	5,751	22.4	+11.1
Project Dignity	Johnny Rivera	2,295	8.9	n/a
Total votes		25,720	100.0	
New Progressive hold				

==== District 8 ====
2024 Puerto Rico Representative District 8 election
Party	Candidate	Votes	%	±%
New Progressive	Yashira Lebrón Rodríguez (incumbent)	13,006	48.0	+8.7
Popular Democratic	Carlos A. Sánchez Rivera	6,083	25.1	+2.0
Independence	Jesús M. Dávila	5,570	20.6	+11.5
Project Dignity	Abdiel Enrique Contreras Álvarez	2,428	9.0	+0.6
Total votes		27,087	100.0	
New Progressive hold				

==== District 9 ====
2024 Puerto Rico Representative District 9 election
Party	Candidate	Votes	%	±%
New Progressive	Félix Pacheco	12,117	46.1	+7.9
Popular Democratic	Noelia Ramos Vázquez	8,061	30.7	−4.8
Citizens' Victory	Gabriel Vicéns Rivera	3,094	11.8	−5.9
Independence	Anabel Sánchez	3,020	11.5	+2.9
Total votes		26,292	100.0	
New Progressive hold				

Incumbent representative Er Y. Morales Díaz lost the PNP primaries to Félix E. Pacheco Burgos.

==== District 10 ====
2024 Puerto Rico Representative District 10 election
Party	Candidate	Votes	%	±%
New Progressive	Pellé Santiago	10,528	42.2	−0.5
Popular Democratic	Deborah Soto Arroyo (incumbent)	8,822	35.4	−8.9
Citizens' Victory	Sahir Pujols	3,511	14.1	n/a
Project Dignity	María Angélica Díaz López	2,066	8.3	n/a
Total votes		24,927	100.0	
New Progressive gain from Popular Democratic				

Pedro J. Santiago Guzmán won the PNP primary.

==== District 11 ====
2024 Puerto Rico Representative District 11 election
Party	Candidate	Votes	%	±%
New Progressive	Elinette González Aguayo	11,262	43.2	+6.5
Popular Democratic	Rubén Soto	11,090	42.5	+3.7
Citizens' Victory	Eric Rossner	3,714	14.2	−1.4
Total votes		26,066	100.0	
New Progressive gain from Popular Democratic				

Incumbent PPD representative and Speaker of the House Rafael Hernández Montañez announced on August 31, 2023 that he would not run for reelection, instead choosing to run for mayor of Dorado. Rubén Soto Rivera won the PPD primary, while Elinnette González Aguayo won the PNP primary.

==== District 12 ====
2024 Puerto Rico Representative District 12 election
Party	Candidate	Votes	%	±%
Popular Democratic	Edgardo Feliciano Sánchez (incumbent)	11,869	39.8	–
New Progressive	Jesús (Nolo) Figueroa	11,235	37.7	+0.4
Independence	Anamari Ojeda Vilá	3,489	11.7	+7.2
Project Dignity	Benjamín Cardona Rosario	2,265	7.6	n/a
Citizens' Victory	Ángel G. Torres Maldonado	963	3.2	
Total votes		29,821	100.0	
Popular Democratic hold				

Jesús M. Figueroa Torres won the PNP primary.

==== District 13 ====
2024 Puerto Rico Representative District 13 election
Party	Candidate	Votes	%	±%
New Progressive	Jerry Nieves Rosario	12,518	45.8	+4.8
Popular Democratic	Yulixa Paredes Albarrán	9,012	33.0	−7.2
Project Dignity	Kevin C. Cruz Chacón	3,272	12.0	n/a
Citizens' Victory	Teresa Vélez Rolón	2,535	9.3	−1.2
Total votes		27,337	100.0	
New Progressive hold				

Incumbent PNP representative Gabriel Rodríguez Aguiló announced on March 25, 2022 that he would not seek reelection in the district 13 seat which he has held since 2005, instead choosing to run for an At-Large seat. Jerry Z. Nieves Rosario won the PNP primary, while Yulixa A. Paredes Albarrán won the PPD primary.

==== District 14 ====
2024 Puerto Rico Representative District 14 election
Party	Candidate	Votes	%	±%
New Progressive	Edgar Robles	13,087	43.0	−0.4
Popular Democratic	Juan Carlos Colón González	11,684	38.4	+5.3
Project Dignity	Deniel Batista Crespo	3,099	10.2	−0.4
Independence	Karina García	2,561	8.4	+4.1
Total votes		30,431	100.0	
New Progressive hold				

Incumbent PNP representative José O. González Mercado announced on November 18, 2023 that he would not run for reelection, instead choosing to run for mayor of Arecibo. Edgar E. Robles Rivera won the PNP primary, while Juan C. Colón González won the PPD primary.

==== District 15 ====
2024 Puerto Rico Representative District 15 election
Party	Candidate	Votes	%	±%
New Progressive	Joel Franqui Atiles (incumbent)	17,679	51.6	+4.6
Popular Democratic	Iván Serrano	10,054	29.3	−15.9
Project Dignity	Abiatar Ramos Jiménez	3,744	10.9	n/a
Independence	Fernando Babilonia Aguilar	2,781	8.1	+0.2
Total votes		34,258	100.0	
New Progressive hold				

Iván Serrano Cordero won the PPD primary.

==== District 16 ====
2024 Puerto Rico Representative District 16 election
Party	Candidate	Votes	%	±%
Popular Democratic	Rey Figueroa	13,298	40.0	−9.3
New Progressive	Liza I. Alfaro Mercado	11,605	34.5	−9.0
Project Dignity	Ángel Lebrón	5,555	16.5	n/a
Independence	Reynaldo Acevedo Vélez	3,139	9.3	+2.1
Total votes		33,597	100.0	
Popular Democratic hold				

Incumbent PPD representative Eladio J. Cardona Quiles announced on December 28, 2023 that he would not run for reelection, instead choosing to run for mayor of San Sebastian. Reinaldo Figueroa Acevedo won the PPD primary, while Liza I. Alfaro Mercado won the PNP primary.

==== District 17 ====
2024 Puerto Rico Representative District 17 election
Party	Candidate	Votes	%	±%
New Progressive	Wilson Román (incumbent)	14,615	46.8	−0.3
Popular Democratic	Kenneth Sanabria Domenech	11,141	35.6	−3.6
Independence	Playuela Santaella Buitrago	2,792	8.9	+3.3
Project Dignity	Ramón Antonio Román Márquez	2,712	8.7	n/a
Total votes		31,260	100.0	
New Progressive hold				

Incumbent representative Wilson J. Román López won the PNP primary, while Kenneth R. Sanabría Domenech won the PPD primary.

==== District 18 ====
2024 Puerto Rico Representative District 18 election
Party	Candidate	Votes	%	±%
New Progressive	Odalys González González	16,515	47.7	+4.4
Popular Democratic	Jessie Cortés Ramos (incumbent)	14,206	41.0	−3.5
Project Dignity	Héctor López Cardona	2,004	5.8	n/a
Citizens' Victory	Christian Santiago	1,911	5.5	−3.5
Total votes		34,636	100.0	
New Progressive gain from Popular Democratic				

Odalys González González won the PNP primary.

==== District 19 ====
2024 Puerto Rico Representative District 19 election
Party	Candidate	Votes	%	±%
Popular Democratic	Lilly Rosas	10,994	40.7	−0.6
New Progressive	Edson Rodríguez	9,311	34.5	−1.2
Independence	Leonor M. Velázquez Franceschi	3,723	13.8	+3.8
Project Dignity	Felipe Morales Nieves	1,572	5.8	n/a
Citizens' Victory	Julia Mignucci	1,420	5.3	−7.7
Total votes		27,020	100.0	
Popular Democratic hold				

Incumbent PPD representative Jocelyn M. Rodríguez Negrón announced on December 23, 2023 that she would not run for reelection, instead choosing to run for mayor of Mayagüez. Lilibeth Rosas Vargas won the PPD primary, while Edson R. Rodríguez González won the PNP primary.

==== District 20 ====
2024 Puerto Rico Representative District 20 election
Party	Candidate	Votes	%	±%
New Progressive	Emilio Carlo	11,541	38.1	+3.4
Popular Democratic	Joel Sánchez Ayala	11,180	36.9	−3.0
Independence	Juliana I. Ortiz Rodríguez	5,333	17.6	+6.2
Project Dignity	Edgar Agosto Betancourt	1,434	4.7	n/a
Citizens' Victory	Tony Linares Hernández	826	2.7	−11.3
Total votes		30,314	100.0	
New Progressive gain from Popular Democratic				

On February 28, 2023, Incumbent PPD representative Kebin Maldonado Martínez announced that he would be stepping down from his post to become a National Guard Officer. Joel Sánchez Ayala was chosen to fill this representative seat. Emilio Carlo Acosta won the PNP primary.

==== District 21 ====
2024 Puerto Rico Representative District 21 election
Party	Candidate	Votes	%	±%
New Progressive	Omayra Martínez	15,279	44.8	+3.4
Popular Democratic	Joey Cuevas	13,778	40.4	−1.9
Independence	Luiche Santiago	3,322	9.7	+3.4
Project Dignity	Leo Vázquez Santiago	1,762	5.2	n/a
Total votes		34,141	100.0	
New Progressive gain from Popular Democratic				

Incumbent PPD primary Lydia Méndez Silva announced on November 14, 2023 that she would not run for reelection, instead choosing to retire after 28 years of service. José A. Cuevas Garcia won the PPD primary, while Omayra M. Mártinez Vázquez won the PNP primary.

==== District 22 ====
2024 Puerto Rico Representative District 22 election
Party	Candidate	Votes	%	±%
New Progressive	Joito Colón	17,765	47.0	+0.4
Popular Democratic	Jorge Alfredo Rivera (incumbent)	16,362	43.3	−5.1
Independence	Astrid Raquel Cruz Negrón	3,653	9.7	+4.7
Total votes		37,780	100.0	
New Progressive gain from Popular Democratic				

Joe A. Colón Rodriguez won the PNP primary.

==== District 23 ====
2024 Puerto Rico Representative District 23 election
Party	Candidate	Votes	%	±%
New Progressive	Ensol Rodríguez Torres	15,173	43.1	+5.8
Popular Democratic	Cheito Rivera Madera (incumbent)	13,361	37.9	–
Independence	Lugo Boneta	3,052	8.7	+0.5
Citizens' Victory	Daniel Ortiz Vargas	2,160	6.1	−10.5
Project Dignity	Josué Eliú Pagán Carbone	1,492	4.2	n/a
Total votes		35,238	100.0	
New Progressive gain from Popular Democratic				

==== District 24 ====
2024 Puerto Rico Representative District 24 election
Party	Candidate	Votes	%	±%
Popular Democratic	Ángel A. Fourquet Cordero (incumbent)	11,188	44.4	+8.1
New Progressive	Doris Alvarado Golderos	8,508	33.8	+1.8
Project Dignity	Elaine M. Arrufat Berastaín	2,768	11.0	+1.5
Citizens' Victory	José A. Hernández Lázaro	2,720	10.8	−2.6
Total votes		25,184	100.0	
Popular Democratic hold				

Doris E. Alvarado Golderos won the PNP primary.

==== District 25 ====
2024 Puerto Rico Representative District 25 election
Party	Candidate	Votes	%	±%
Popular Democratic	Domingo Torres Garcia (incumbent)	12,203	42.5%	+0.4
New Progressive	Daniel Vega Ortiz	10,168	35.4%	−1.4
Independence	Gerardo Cruz López	3,953	13.8	+3.1
Project Dignity	Luis Antonio Yordán Frau	2,419	8.4	−2.0
Total votes		28,743	100.0	
Popular Democratic hold				

==== District 26 ====
2024 Puerto Rico Representative District 26 election
Party	Candidate	Votes	%	±%
New Progressive	Josean Jiménez Torres	17,906	50.7	+8.8
Popular Democratic	Chui Hernández Arroyo (incumbent)	15,512	43.9	−7.9
Citizens' Victory	Sigfredo Torres Cintrón	1,916	5.4	−0.9
Total votes		35,334	100.0	
New Progressive gain from Popular Democratic				

Incumbent PPD representative Orlando Aponte Rosario was accused by his wife on April 13, 2023 of physically abusing her, for which a court gave the representative a restraining order. Even though she later removed this restraining order, the news had affected his political career, and he decided to renounce from his post on June 13. To fill this seat, on August 6, the party had a special internal primary where Jesús A. Hernández Arroyo won. Luis J. Jiménez Torres won the PNP primary.

==== District 27 ====
2024 Puerto Rico Representative District 27 election
Party	Candidate	Votes	%	±%
Popular Democratic	Estrella Martínez Soto (incumbent)	13,470	42.3	−6.1
New Progressive	Adriach Bermúdez Ortiz	12,069	37.9	−2.4
Independence	Andrés A. Román Arguinzoni	4,725	14.8	+3.5
Project Dignity	Evette Mejías Rivera	1,562	4.9	n/a
Total votes		31,826	100.0	
Popular Democratic hold				

==== District 28 ====
2024 Puerto Rico Representative District 28 election
Party	Candidate	Votes	%	±%
New Progressive	Chino Roque	16,649	51.0	+12.1
Popular Democratic	Juan Santiago Nieves (incumbent)	12,680	38.8	−7.8
Independence	Elsa Berríos López	3,322	10.2	+6.4
Total votes		32,651	100.0	
New Progressive gain from Popular Democratic				

==== District 29 ====
2024 Puerto Rico Representative District 29 election
Party	Candidate	Votes	%	±%
Popular Democratic	Gretchen Hau (incumbent)	12,837	46.9	−2.7
New Progressive	Christopher García Figueroa	9,605	35.1	+0.9
Citizens' Victory	Rebecca I. Cotto Morales	4,905	17.9	+1.2
Total votes		27,347	100.0	
Popular Democratic hold				

==== District 30 ====
2024 Puerto Rico Representative District 30 election
Party	Candidate	Votes	%	±%
New Progressive	Fernándo Sanabria	13,651	44.3	+3.8
Popular Democratic	Luis Ortiz Lugo (incumbent)	13,331	43.3	−5.9
Independence	Justo Echevarría	3,822	12.4	+2.0
Total votes		30,804	100.0	
New Progressive gain from Popular Democratic				

Fernando Sanabria Colón won the PNP primary.

==== District 31 ====
2024 Puerto Rico Representative District 31 election
Party	Candidate	Votes	%	±%
New Progressive	Vimarie Peña Dávila	10,962	35.4	+2.9
Popular Democratic	Jesús Santa Rodríguez (incumbent)	10,769	34.8	+2.0
Independence	Raúl Tirado	6,997	22.6	+10.0
Project Dignity	Wilfredo Elías Bachour Ortiz	2,255	7.3	+0.1
Total votes		30,983	100.0	
New Progressive gain from Popular Democratic				

==== District 32 ====
2024 Puerto Rico Representative District 32 election
Party	Candidate	Votes	%	±%
Popular Democratic	Conny Varela (incumbent)	10,342	40.6	+5.2
New Progressive	Evelyn Aponte Vázquez	9,613	37.7	+8.1
Citizens' Victory	Maritza Maymí Hernández	3,415	13.4	−9.0
Project Dignity	George Mendoza Roque	2,110	8.3	n/a
Total votes		25,480	100.0	
Popular Democratic hold				

==== District 33 ====
2024 Puerto Rico Representative District 33 election
Party	Candidate	Votes	%	±%
New Progressive	Angel Peña Ramírez (incumbent)	14,695	52.3	+2.4
Popular Democratic	Güi Mojica Carrasquillo	8,292	29.5	−7.2
Independence	Tati Santana Muñoz	3,621	12.9	−0.5
Citizens' Victory	Julio A. Muriente Pérez	1,491	5.3	n/a
Total votes		28,099	100.0	
New Progressive hold				

==== District 34 ====
2024 Puerto Rico Representative District 34 election
Party	Candidate	Votes	%	±%
New Progressive	Christian Muriel	16,831	47.6	+6.7
Popular Democratic	Ramón Luis Cruz (incumbent)	15,130	42.8	−8.4
Independence	Catalino Santiago	3,383	9.6	+2.6
Total votes		35,344	100.0	
New Progressive gain from Popular Democratic				

Cristian O. Muriel Sánchez won the PNP primary.

==== District 35 ====
2024 Puerto Rico Representative District 35 election
Party	Candidate	Votes	%	±%
Popular Democratic	Sol Yamiz Higgins Cuadrado	12,636	43.1	−6.2
New Progressive	Jean Paul Carrillo Cáceres	10,936	37.3	+4.4
Independence	Ricardo Díaz Maldonado	2,871	9.8	+1.5
Project Dignity	Rosanna Ortiz García	2,858	9.7	n/a
Total votes		29,301	100.0	
Popular Democratic hold				

Jean P. Carrillo Cáceres won the PNP primary.

==== District 36 ====
2024 Puerto Rico Representative District 36 election
Party	Candidate	Votes	%	±%
New Progressive	Carlos Johnny Méndez (incumbent)	12,419	50.2	+5.8
Popular Democratic	Tito Gómez	7,301	29.5	−13.6
Citizens' Victory	Johanna Liz Santiago Santiago	2,636	10.7	−1.8
Project Dignity	Ricardo Ruiz Rivera	2,381	9.6	n/a
Total votes		24,737	100.0	
New Progressive hold				

==== District 37 ====
2024 Puerto Rico Representative District 37 election
Party	Candidate	Votes	%	±%
New Progressive	Carmen Medina Calderón	10,684	40.6	−0.7
Popular Democratic	Angel Osorio	9,616	36.6	−2.0
Independence	Reginald Michael Carrasquillo Maisonet	3,262	12.4	+4.2
Project Dignity	Héctor Andrés Santiago Ramos	2,727	10.4	−1.5
Total votes		26,289	100.0	
New Progressive hold				

Incumbent PNP representative Ángel Bulerín Ramos on January 6, 2024 that he would not run for reelection, instead choosing to retire after 55 years of service, 32 of which were in this seat. Carmen M. Medina Calderón won the PNP primary, while Ángel Osorio Vélez won the PPD primary.

==== District 38 ====
2024 Puerto Rico Representative District 38 election
Party	Candidate	Votes	%	±%
New Progressive	Wanda Del Valle Correa	12,774	50.7	+14.0
Popular Democratic	Christian Rodríguez Rivera	7,649	30.3	−3.5
Independence	Roberto Figueroa Acosta	4,780	19.0	+10.8
Total votes		25,203	100.0	
New Progressive hold				

Incumbent representative Wanda del Valle Correa won the PNP primary, while Christian G. Rodriguez Rivera won the PPD primary.

==== District 39 ====
2024 Puerto Rico Representative District 39 election
Party	Candidate	Votes	%	±%
Popular Democratic	Roberto Rivera Ruiz de Porras (incumbent)	8,868	36.9	−0.3
New Progressive	Piku López Santiago	8,061	33.5	+4.4
Citizens' Victory	Juan C. Del Valle (El Enfermero)	4,462	18.6	−6.3
Project Dignity	Janise W. Santiago Ramos	2,659	11.1	n/a
Total votes		24,050	100.0	
Popular Democratic hold				

==== District 40 ====
2024 Puerto Rico Representative District 40 election
Party	Candidate	Votes	%	±%
New Progressive	Sergio Estévez	8,301	34.8	+4.4
Popular Democratic	Angel Matos García (incumbent)	7,756	32.5	−4.0
Independence	Nelie Lebrón Robles	5,884	24.6	+14.3
Project Dignity	Gilberto Rodríguez Velázquez	1,942	8.1	n/a
Total votes		23,883	100.0	
New Progressive gain from Popular Democratic				

Sergio E. Estévez Vélez won the PNP primary.
