= 2020 Puerto Rico House of Representatives election =

2020 Puerto Rico House of Representatives elections
- November 3, 2020

All 51 seats in the House of Representatives 26 seats needed for a majority
	Majority party	Minority party	Third party
Leader	Tatito Hernández	Johnny Méndez	Mariana Nogales Molinelli
Party	Popular Democratic	New Progressive	Citizens' Victory
Leader since	January 3, 2017	January 3, 2017
Seats before	16	34	New
Seats after	26	21	2
Seat change	▲10	▼13	▲2
Popular vote	850,805	823,864	276,898
Percentage	37.42%	36.23%	12.18%
	Fourth party	Fifth party
Leader	Denis Márquez Lebrón	Lisie Burgos Muñiz
Party	Independence	Project Dignity
Seats before	1	New
Seats after	1	1
Seat change	Steady	▲1
Popular vote	221,837	97,430
Percentage	9.76%	4.28%
- Election results: PNP gain PPD gain PNP hold PPD hold MVC gain Project Dignity gain PIP hold
Speaker of the House before election
Johnny Méndez
New Progressive
Elected Speaker of the House
Tatito Hernández
Popular Democratic

The 2020 Puerto Rico House of Representatives election was held on November 3, 2020, to elect the members of the 31st House of Representatives of Puerto Rico, concurrently with the election of the governor, the Resident Commissioner, the Senate, and the mayors of the 78 municipalities. The winners were elected to a four-year term from January 3, 2021, to January 3, 2025.

The New Progressive Party lost their 2/3 majority. The Popular Democratic Party narrowly surpassed the 26-seat threshold, and acquired the 1/2 majority. The Puerto Rican Independence Party retained their seat, while the Citizen's Victory Movement and Project Dignity gained two and one seat, respectively.

== Summary ==
172 candidates were running for representative:

- New Progressive Party (PNP) had 46 candidates, 30 of whom were incumbent.
- Popular Democratic Party (PPD) had 46 candidates, 11 of whom were incumbent.
- Puerto Rican Independence Party (PIP) had 41 candidates, one of whom was incumbent.
- Citizen’s Victory Movement (MVC) had 28 candidates.
- Project Dignity (PD) had eight candidates.
- Three candidates were independent.

== House of Representatives composition ==
=== 30th House of Representatives (2017–2021) ===
PNP_{1}	PNP_{2}	PNP_{3}	PNP_{4}	PNP_{5}	PNP_{6}	PNP_{7}	PNP_{8}	PNP_{9}	PNP_{10}	PNP_{11}
PNP_{12}	PNP_{13}	PNP_{14}	PNP_{15}	PNP_{16}	PNP_{17}	PNP_{18}	PNP_{19}	PNP_{20}	PNP_{21}	PNP_{22}
PNP_{23}	PNP_{24}	PNP_{25}	PNP_{26}	PNP_{27}	PNP_{28}	PNP_{29}	PNP_{30}	PNP_{31}	PNP_{32}	PNP_{33}
PNP_{34}	PPD_{1}	PPD_{2}	PPD_{3}	PPD_{4}	PPD_{5}	PPD_{6}	PPD_{7}	PPD_{8}	PPD_{9}	PPD_{10}
PPD_{11}	PPD_{12}	PPD_{13}	PPD_{14}	PPD_{15}	PPD_{16}	PIP_{1}				

=== 31st House of Representatives (2021–2025) ===
PPD_{1}	PPD_{2}	PPD_{3}	PPD_{4}	PPD_{5}	PPD_{6}	PPD_{7}	PPD_{8}	PPD_{9}	PPD_{10}	PPD_{11}
PPD_{12}	PPD_{13}	PPD_{14}	PPD_{15}	PPD_{16}	PPD_{17}	PPD_{18}	PPD_{19}	PPD_{20}	PPD_{21}	PPD_{22}
PPD_{23}	PPD_{24}	PPD_{25}	PPD_{26}	PNP_{1}	PNP_{2}	PNP_{3}	PNP_{4}	PNP_{5}	PNP_{6}	PNP_{7}
PNP_{8}	PNP_{9}	PNP_{10}	PNP_{11}	PNP_{12}	PNP_{13}	PNP_{14}	PNP_{15}	PNP_{16}	PNP_{17}	PNP_{18}
PNP_{19}	PNP_{20}	PNP_{21}	MVC_{1}	MVC_{2}	PIP_{1}	PD_{1}				

== Results ==
=== Summary ===
Parties	District			At-large			Total seats	Composition	±
Parties	Votes	%	Seats	Votes	%	Seats	Total seats	Composition	±
Popular Democratic Party (PPD)	436,522	39.04%	24	414,283	35.84%	2	26	26 / 51	▲10
New Progressive Party (PNP)	435,930	38.99%	16	387,934	33.57%	5	21	21 / 51	▼13
Citizen's Victory Movement (MVC)	125,489	11.22%	0	151,409	13.10%	2	2	2 / 51	▲2
Puerto Rican Independence Party (PIP)	98,864	8.84%	0	122,973	10.64%	1	1	1 / 51	Steady
Project Dignity (PD)	18,264	1.63%	0	79,166	6.85%	1	1	1 / 51	▲1
Independents	3,059	0.27%	0	0	0	0	0	0 / 51	Steady
Total	1,118,128	100.0	40	1,155,765	100.0	11	51		

=== At-large Representatives ===
2020 Puerto Rico At-Large Representative election
Party	Candidate	Votes	%	±%
Popular Democratic	Héctor Ferrer Santiago	134,587	11.64%	
Independence	Denis Márquez Lebrón (incumbent)	122,973	10.64%	
Citizens' Victory	Mariana Nogales Molinelli	85,727	7.42%	
Project Dignity	Lisie J. Burgos Muñiz	79,166	6.85%	
New Progressive	José Torres Zamora (incumbent)	77,449	6.70%	
Popular Democratic	Jesús Ortiz González (incumbent)	67,471	5.84%	
New Progressive	José "Quiquito" Meléndez (incumbent)	66,939	5.79%	
Citizens' Victory	Jose Bernando Márquez	65,682	5.68%	
New Progressive	José Aponte Hernández (incumbent)	64,017	5.54%	
New Progressive	Néstor Alonso Vega (incumbent)	61,883	5.35%	
New Progressive	Lourdes Ramos (incumbent)	59,461	5.14%	
New Progressive	Jorge Emmanuel Báez Pagán	58,185	5.03%	
Popular Democratic	Enid Monge	55,475	4.80%	
Popular Democratic	Keyliz Méndez Torres	54,656	4.73%	
Popular Democratic	Yaramary Torres	53,295	4.61%	
Popular Democratic	Gabriel López Arrieta	48,799	4.22%	
Total votes		1,155,765	100.00%	
Turnout		1,232,679	52.32%	

=== District Representatives ===
==== Representative District 1 ====
2020 Puerto Rico Representative District 1 election
Party	Candidate	Votes	%	±%
New Progressive	Eddie Charbonier Chinea (incumbent)	10,506	42.35%	
Citizens' Victory	Alberto Derkes de Leon	5,948	23.98%	
Popular Democratic	Rosario Tata	5,634	22.71%	
Independence	Carmen Santiago Negrón	2,720	10.96%	
Turnout		24,808		
New Progressive hold				

==== Representative District 2 ====
2020 Puerto Rico Representative District 2 election
Party	Candidate	Votes	%	±%
Popular Democratic	Luis Torres Cruz (incumbent)	8,166	31.54%	
New Progressive	Ricardo Rey Ocasio	8,003	30.91%	
Citizens' Victory	Fernando Villaespesa	6,285	24.28%	
Independence	Dario Ortiz González	3,164	12.22%	
Independent	Julio Vargas Cruz	270	1.04%	
Turnout		25,888		
Popular Democratic hold				

==== Representative District 3 ====
2020 Puerto Rico Representative District 3 election
Party	Candidate	Votes	%	±%
New Progressive	Juan Morales Rodríguez (incumbent)	8,590	35.14%	
Citizens' Victory	Eva Prado Rodríguez	8,462	34.61%	
Popular Democratic	José Ortiz	5,898	24.13%	
Independence	Ángel Alicea Montañez	1,497	6.12%	
Turnout		24,447		
New Progressive hold				

==== Representative District 4 ====
2020 Puerto Rico Representative District 4 election
Party	Candidate	Votes	%	±%
New Progressive	Victor Parés (incumbent)	10,189	33.20%	
Popular Democratic	Manuel Calderón Cerame	9,640	31.41%	
Citizens' Victory	Rafaela Esteves Agramonte	6,921	22.55%	
Independence	Marian Ortiz Vargas	3,937	12.83%	
Turnout		30,687		
New Progressive hold				

==== Representative District 5 ====
2020 Puerto Rico Representative District 5 election
Party	Candidate	Votes	%	±%
New Progressive	Jorge Navarro (incumbent)	11,277	35.16%	
Popular Democratic	Roberto Zayas	8,764	27.32%	
Citizens' Victory	Carlos Ávila Pacheco	6,565	20.47%	
Independence	Alfonzo Questell Ortiz	2,841	8.86%	
Project Dignity	Ricardo Rodríguez Quiles	2,630	8.20%	
Turnout		32,077		
New Progressive hold				

==== Representative District 6 ====
2020 Puerto Rico Representative District 6 election
Party	Candidate	Votes	%	±%
New Progressive	Antonio Soto (incumbent)	13,547	44.87%	
Popular Democratic	Noemí Andújar	7,573	25.08%	
Citizens' Victory	Alex Rodríguez Rodríguez	6,471	21.43%	
Independence	Jaime Rodríguez Rivera	2,603	8.62%	
Turnout		30,194		
New Progressive hold				

==== Representative District 7 ====
2020 Puerto Rico Representative District 7 election
Party	Candidate	Votes	%	±%
New Progressive	Luis Pérez Ortiz (incumbent)	11,064	42.03%	
Popular Democratic	Janice Nieves	7,112	27.02%	
Citizens' Victory	Carmen Pagán Cabrera	5,187	19.70%	
Independence	Mario Maldonado Ramírez	2,962	11.25%	
Turnout		26,325		
New Progressive hold				

==== Representative District 8 ====
2020 Puerto Rico Representative District 8 election
Party	Candidate	Votes	%	±%
New Progressive	Yashira Lebrón (incumbent)	10,373	39.33%	
Popular Democratic	Eric Bonilla Latoni	6,092	23.10%	
Citizens' Victory	Moraima Rodríguez	5,303	20.11%	
Independence	Jesús Dávila Molina	2,405	9.12%	
Project Dignity	Paul Rodríguez González	2,202	8.35%	
Turnout		26,375		
New Progressive hold				

==== Representative District 9 ====
2020 Puerto Rico Representative District 9 election
Party	Candidate	Votes	%	±%
New Progressive	Yazzer Morales Díaz	9,801	38.22%	
Popular Democratic	Noelia Ramos Vázquez	9,093	35.46%	
Citizens' Victory	Edna Vázquez Díaz	4,550	17.74%	
Independence	Iván Sánchez Almodovar	2,199	8.56%	
Turnout		25,643		
New Progressive hold				

==== Representative District 10 ====
2020 Puerto Rico Representative District 10 election
Party	Candidate	Votes	%	±%
Popular Democratic	Deborah Soto Arroyo	9,950	44.26%	
New Progressive	Pedro Santiago Guzman (incumbent)	9,609	42.74%	
Independence	Roberto Jusino Serrano	2,922	13.00%	
Turnout		22,481		
Popular Democratic gain from New Progressive				

==== Representative District 11 ====
2020 Puerto Rico Representative District 11 election
Party	Candidate	Votes	%	±%
Popular Democratic	Rafael Hernandez (incumbent)	11,357	38.84%	
New Progressive	Isabela Molina	10,731	36.69%	
Citizens' Victory	Lousif Nevárez de Garcia	4,568	15.62%	
Independence	Guillermo Martínez Rivera	2,588	8.85%	
Turnout		29,244		
Popular Democratic hold				

==== Representative District 12 ====
2020 Puerto Rico Representative District 12 election
Party	Candidate	Votes	%	±%
Popular Democratic	Edgardo Feliciano	11,807	39.79%	
New Progressive	Javier Parés	11,061	37.27%	
Citizens' Victory	Edwin Marrero Santiago	5,465	18.41%	
Independence	Ángel Santana	1,344	4.53%	
Turnout		29,677		
Popular Democratic gain from New Progressive				

==== Representative District 13 ====
2020 Puerto Rico Representative District 13 election
Party	Candidate	Votes	%	±%
New Progressive	Gabriel Rodríguez (incumbent)	12,656	41.23%	
Popular Democratic	Brian Casais García	12,349	40.23%	
Citizens' Victory	José Cintrón	3,223	10.50%	
Independence	Yahaira Velázquez Correa	2,471	8.05%	
Turnout		30,699		
New Progressive hold				

==== Representative District 14 ====
2020 Puerto Rico Representative District 14 election
Party	Candidate	Votes	%	±%
New Progressive	José González (incumbent)	11,862	43.43%	
Popular Democratic	Juan Torres	9,043	33.11%	
Project Dignity	Edwin Mieles Richard	2,892	10.59%	
Citizens' Victory	Ismael Rodríguez Medina	2,338	8.56%	
Independence	Héctor Guillermo Díaz	1,176	4.31%	
Turnout		27,311		
New Progressive hold				

==== Representative District 15 ====
2020 Puerto Rico Representative District 15 election
Party	Candidate	Votes	%	±%
New Progressive	Joel Franqui Atiles (incumbent)	14,769	46.97%	
Popular Democratic	Armando Legarreta Raíces	14,205	45.17%	
Independence	Fernando Babilonia Aguilar	2,471	7.86%	
Turnout		31,445		
New Progressive hold				

==== Representative District 16 ====
2020 Puerto Rico Representative District 16 election
Party	Candidate	Votes	%	±%
Popular Democratic	Eladio Cardonia	15,847	49.30%	
New Progressive	Félix Lassalle Toro (incumbent)	13,969	43.46%	
Independence	Pedro Méndez Acosta	2,326	7.24%	
Turnout		32,142		
Popular Democratic gain from New Progressive				

==== Representative District 17 ====
2020 Puerto Rico Representative District 17 election
Party	Candidate	Votes	%	±%
New Progressive	Wilson Roman (incumbent)	14,101	47.14%	
Popular Democratic	David Villanueva	11,711	39.15%	
Citizens' Victory	Santiago Concepción	2,442	8.16%	
Independence	Hector Santaella Buitrago	1,661	5.55%	
Turnout		29,915		
New Progressive hold				

==== Representative District 18 ====
2020 Puerto Rico Representative District 18 election
Party	Candidate	Votes	%	±%
Popular Democratic	Jessi Cortés Ramos	14,961	43.53%	
New Progressive	Jose Pérez Cordero (incumbent)	14,895	43.34%	
Citizens' Victory	Pedro Acevedo Vargas	3,099	9.02%	
Independence	Antonio Vargas Morales	1,416	4.12%	
Turnout		34,371		
Popular Democratic gain from New Progressive				

==== Representative District 19 ====
2020 Puerto Rico Representative District 19 election
Party	Candidate	Votes	%	±%
Popular Democratic	Jocelyne Rodríguez Negrón	9,892	41.34%	
New Progressive	Maricarmen Mas (incumbent)	8,541	35.70%	
Citizens' Victory	Yadira Vázquez Rivera	3,102	12.96%	
Independence	Jose Muñiz Quiñones	2,392	10.00%	
Turnout		23,927		
Popular Democratic gain from New Progressive				

==== Representative District 20 ====
2020 Puerto Rico Representative District 20 election
Party	Candidate	Votes	%	±%
Popular Democratic	Kebin Maldonado Martinez	11,669	39.89%	
New Progressive	Emilio Carlo	10,155	34.71%	
Citizens' Victory	Noé Ramírez Ramírez	4,087	13.97%	
Independence	Milagros Martínez Pérez	3,344	11.43%	
Turnout		29,255		
Popular Democratic hold				

==== Representative District 21 ====
2020 Puerto Rico Representative District 21 election
Party	Candidate	Votes	%	±%
Popular Democratic	Lydia Méndez (incumbent)	12,122	42.29%	
New Progressive	Yamilet González Alicea	11,870	41.42%	
Citizens' Victory	Andrés Acosta Mercado	2,867	10.00%	
Independence	Jaime Camacho Román	1,802	6.29%	
Turnout		28,661		
Popular Democratic hold				

==== Representative District 22 ====
2020 Puerto Rico Representative District 22 election
Party	Candidate	Votes	%	±%
Popular Democratic	Jorge Alfredo Rivera	15,049	48.44%	
New Progressive	Michael Quiñones (incumbent)	14,483	46.61%	
Independence	Edna Quiñones	1,538	4.95%	
Turnout		31,070		
Popular Democratic gain from New Progressive				

==== Representative District 23 ====
2020 Puerto Rico Representative District 23 election
Party	Candidate	Votes	%	±%
Popular Democratic	José Rivera Madera	11,017	37.96%	
New Progressive	Victor Torres (incumbent)	10,816	37.27%	
Citizens' Victory	Saime Figueroa Rodríguez	4,803	16.55%	
Independence	Jimmy Borrero	2,385	8.22%	
Turnout		29,021		
Popular Democratic gain from New Progressive				

==== Representative District 24 ====
2020 Puerto Rico Representative District 24 election
Party	Candidate	Votes	%	±%
Popular Democratic	Ángel Fourquet	9,024	36.34%	
New Progressive	José Bachs Alemán (incumbent)	7,944	31.99%	
Citizens' Victory	Reinaldo Colón Alonso	3,325	13.39%	
Project Dignity	Luis Salinas	2,353	9.48%	
Independence	Carlos Reyes Alonso	2,185	8.80%	
Turnout		24,831		
Popular Democratic gain from New Progressive				

==== Representative District 25 ====
2020 Puerto Rico Representative District 25 election
Party	Candidate	Votes	%	±%
Popular Democratic	Domingo Torres Garcia	11,453	42.08%	
New Progressive	Jacqueline Rodríguez (incumbent)	10,021	36.82%	
Independence	Gerardo Cruz López	2,908	10.68%	
Project Dignity	José Hernández Pagán	2,837	10.42%	
Turnout		27,219		
Popular Democratic gain from New Progressive				

==== Representative District 26 ====
2020 Puerto Rico Representative District 26 election
Party	Candidate	Votes	%	±%
Popular Democratic	Orlando Aponte Rosario	18,096	51.80%	
New Progressive	Urayoán Hernández (incumbent)	14,636	41.89%	
Independence	Calixto Negrón Aponte	2,203	6.31%	
Turnout		34,935		
Popular Democratic gain from New Progressive				

==== Representative District 27 ====
2020 Puerto Rico Representative District 27 election
Party	Candidate	Votes	%	±%
Popular Democratic	Estrella Martínez Soto	14,230	48.39%	
New Progressive	Manuel Claudio (incumbent)	11,850	40.30%	
Independence	Rafael Rosario Rivera	3,327	11.31%	
Turnout		29,407		
Popular Democratic gain from New Progressive				

==== Representative District 28 ====
2020 Puerto Rico Representative District 28 election
Party	Candidate	Votes	%	±%
Popular Democratic	Juan Santiago Nieves	17,059	46.60%	
New Progressive	Rafael June Rivera (incumbent)	14,251	38.93%	
Citizens' Victory	José Daniel Rodríguez	3,894	10.64%	
Independence	Roy Ayala Pérez	1,402	3.83%	
Turnout		36,606		
Popular Democratic gain from New Progressive				

==== Representative District 29 ====
2020 Puerto Rico Representative District 29 election
Party	Candidate	Votes	%	±%
Popular Democratic	José Díaz Collazo (incumbent)	13,093	49.64%	
New Progressive	Lisandro Morales Vázquez	9,024	34.21%	
Independence	Fernando Maldonado Morales	4,259	16.15%	
Turnout		26,376		
Popular Democratic hold				

==== Representative District 30 ====
2020 Puerto Rico Representative District 30 election
Party	Candidate	Votes	%	±%
Popular Democratic	Luis Ortiz Lugo (incumbent)	12,160	49.16%	
New Progressive	Héctor Torres	10,017	40.49%	
Independence	Eduardo Soto	2,561	10.35%	
Turnout		24,738		
Popular Democratic hold				

==== Representative District 31 ====
2020 Puerto Rico Representative District 31 election
Party	Candidate	Votes	%	±%
Popular Democratic	Jesús Santa Rodríguez (incumbent)	10,369	32.84%	
New Progressive	Vimarie Peña Dávila	10,255	32.48%	
Citizens' Victory	César García Martínez	4,994	15.82%	
Independence	Luis Domenech Sepúlveda	3,675	11.64%	
Project Dignity	Raúl Colón Rodríguez	2,279	7.22%	
Turnout		31,572		
Popular Democratic hold				

==== Representative District 32 ====
2020 Puerto Rico Representative District 32 election
Party	Candidate	Votes	%	±%
Popular Democratic	José Varela (incumbent)	8,558	35.43%	
New Progressive	José Figueroa	7,146	29.58%	
Citizens' Victory	Maritza Maymí Hernández	5,420	22.44%	
Independence	Jesús Roque	3,034	12.56%	
Turnout		24,158		
Popular Democratic hold				

==== Representative District 33 ====
2020 Puerto Rico Representative District 33 election
Party	Candidate	Votes	%	±%
New Progressive	Ángel Peña Jr. (incumbent)	13,257	49.91%	
Popular Democratic	Luis Collazo Negrón	9,757	36.73%	
Independence	Gloria Santana Velázquez	3,548	13.36%	
Turnout		26,562		
New Progressive hold				

==== Representative District 34 ====
2020 Puerto Rico Representative District 34 election
Party	Candidate	Votes	%	±%
Popular Democratic	Ramón Cruz Burgos (incumbent)	16,719	52.18%	
New Progressive	Félix Figueroa	13,098	40.88%	
Independence	Carlos Rosado Dávila	2,227	6.95%	
Turnout		32,044		
Popular Democratic hold				

==== Representative District 35 ====
2020 Puerto Rico Representative District 35 election
Party	Candidate	Votes	%	±%
Popular Democratic	Sol Higgins	11,892	49.26%	
New Progressive	Alejandro Martínez Burgos	7,933	32.86%	
Independent	Samuel Pagán Cuadrado	2,321	9.61%	
Independence	Ricardo Díaz Maldonado	1,996	8.27%	
Turnout		24,142		
Popular Democratic gain from New Progressive				

==== Representative District 36 ====
2020 Puerto Rico Representative District 36 election
Party	Candidate	Votes	%	±%
New Progressive	Carlos Méndez (incumbent)	9,634	44.36%	
Popular Democratic	Juan Gómez	9,364	43.11%	
Independence	Lydia Ramos Ivaldo	2,722	12.53%	
Turnout		21,720		
New Progressive hold				

==== Representative District 37 ====
2020 Puerto Rico Representative District 37 election
Party	Candidate	Votes	%	±%
New Progressive	Ángel Bulerín (incumbent)	10,639	41.31%	
Popular Democratic	Ángel Osorio Vélez	9,933	38.56%	
Project Dignity	Eilleen Ramos Rivera	3,071	11.92%	
Independence	Reginald Carrasquillo	2,114	8.21%	
Turnout		25,757		
New Progressive hold				

==== Representative District 38 ====
2020 Puerto Rico Representative District 38 election
Party	Candidate	Votes	%	±%
New Progressive	Wanda del Valle Correa	9,696	36.66%	
Popular Democratic	Luis Rivera Filomino	8,941	33.80%	
Citizens' Victory	Daniel Lugo Mercado	5,188	19.61%	
Independence	Luz Álvarez Rodríguez	2,158	8.16%	
Independent	Emmanuel Huertas	468	1.77%	
Turnout		26,451		
New Progressive gain from Popular Democratic				

==== Representative District 39 ====
2020 Puerto Rico Representative District 39 election
Party	Candidate	Votes	%	±%
Popular Democratic	Roberto Rivera Ruiz (incumbent)	8,949	37.18%	
New Progressive	Luis Alberto Cortés	7,012	29.13%	
Citizens' Victory	Manuel Alonso López	5,984	24.86%	
Independence	Luis Cruz Batista	2,124	8.82%	
Turnout		24,069		
Popular Democratic hold				

==== Representative District 40 ====
2020 Puerto Rico Representative District 40 election
Party	Candidate	Votes	%	±%
Popular Democratic	Ángel Matos Garcia (incumbent)	7,974	36.45%	
New Progressive	Sergio Estevez	6,649	30.39%	
Citizens' Victory	Tiffany Rohena	4,998	22.84%	
Independence	María Vargas Cáceres	2,257	10.32%	
Turnout		21,878		
Popular Democratic hold				
