= Tony Soto (politician) =

Puerto Rican politician

Antonio "Tony" Soto

Member of the Puerto Rico House of Representatives from the 6th District
- In office January 2, 2013 – February 26, 2021
- Preceded by: Angel Pérez Otero
- Succeeded by: Ángel Morey Noble

Personal details
- Born: April 6, 1973 (age 53) Bayamón, Puerto Rico
- Party: New Progressive Party (PNP)

Antonio "Tony" Soto (born April 6, 1973) is a Puerto Rican politician affiliated with the New Progressive Party (PNP). He was elected to the Puerto Rico House of Representatives in 2012 and served until 2021, representing District 6. Soto resigned from his House seat effective February 28, 2021, citing the need to take charge of his family's businesses.

Soto was involved in a scandal during the 2012 PNP primaries, when it was revealed that there were some irregularities in the voting process at his District. Some of the irregularities involved Mayor of Guaynabo, Héctor O'Neill, forcing members of the municipal police to vote for him, instead of voting for his rival, incumbent Angel Pérez. In the end, Soto prevailed, preventing Pérez from running at the upcoming elections.
