= Urayoán Hernández =

Puerto Rican politician

Urayoán Hernández Alvarado

Member 29th House of Representatives of Puerto Rico for District 26
- In office January 2, 2013 – January 2, 2021
- Preceded by: José Jiménez Negrón

Personal details
- Born: Bermejales, Orocovis, Puerto Rico
- Party: PNP
- Education: Polytechnic University of Puerto Rico (BA)
- Profession: land surveyor

Urayoán Hernández Alvarado is a Puerto Rican politician affiliated with the New Progressive Party (PNP). He was elected to the 29th House of Representatives of Puerto Rico in the 2012 Puerto Rican general election to represent District 26. Has a B.A. degree in surveying and cartography at the Polytechnic University of Puerto Rico.

== Notes ==
House of Representatives of Puerto Rico
Preceded by José Jiménez Negrón	Member of the Puerto Rico House of Representatives from the 26th District; 2013–2021	Succeeded by Orlando Aponte Rosario
Preceded by Carlos Bianchi Angleró	Majority Whip of the Puerto Rico House of Representatives; 2017–2021	Succeeded by Roberto Rivera Ruiz de Porras
