= Sylvia Rodríguez Aponte =

Puerto Rican politician

Member of the Puerto Rico House of Representatives from the 31st District
- In office January 2, 2001 – January 1, 2013
- Preceded by: José Alberto Nuñez
- Succeeded by: Jesús Santa Rodríguez

Member of the Municipal Assembly of Caguas, Puerto Rico
- In office 2025

Personal details
- Born: January 8 Orocovis, Puerto Rico
- Party: Popular Democratic Party (PPD)
- Spouse: Juan Corujo Collazo (until 2003, his death)
- Children: 2
- Education: University of Puerto Rico (AS, B. Voc)

Sylvia Rodríguez Aponte de Corujo is a Puerto Rican politician affiliated with the Popular Democratic Party (PPD). She was a member of the Puerto Rico House of Representatives from 2001 to 2013 representing District 31.

== Early years and studies ==
Sylvia Rodríguez was born in Orocovis on January 8. She began her high school studies in her hometown. She then transferred to Puerto Rico High School of Commerce in Río Piedras during the day, and Central High School in Santurce during the night.

Rodríguez received an Associate degree in Secretarial Sciences from the University of Puerto Rico, and later completed a Bachelor's degree as Vocational Teacher.

== Professional career ==
In 1985, Rodríguez founded the Liceo de Arte y Diseño in Caguas.

She also worked for several years in the Community Service Department of WKAQ-TV, and later in Telecine de la Tarde and the News Department.

In the volunteering area, he chaired several international organizations, including the American Cancer Society and the American Red Cross, Caguas Chapter.

== Political career ==
Rodríguez began her political career in 2000, when she was elected to the House of Representatives of Puerto Rico at the general election. She became the first woman to represent District 31 as a Representative. During her first term, she presided over the Commission of Tourism.

Rodríguez was reelected in 2004. Since her party lost the Majority in both the House and Senate, she couldn't continue to preside over the Tourism Commission, but still served as her party speaker in it, which she maintained after being reelected a second time in 2008. During her third and last term, she was a member of the Commissions of Education, Family Affairs, among others. Sylvia Rodríguez Aponte did not a seek reelection in the 2012 elections.

In 2024 Sylvia Rodríguez Aponte was elected Member of the Municipal Assembly of Caguas, Puerto Rico.

== Personal life ==
Rodríguez was married to former Representative and Superior Judge Juan Corujo Collazo. Corujo died on December 16, 2001.
