= José Jiménez Negrón =

Puerto Rican politician (born 1954)

Member of the Puerto Rico House of Representatives from the 26th District
- In office January 2, 1997 – January 1, 2013
- Preceded by: José López Torres
- Succeeded by: Urayoán Hernández

Personal details
- Born: June 4, 1954 (age 72) Orocovis, Puerto Rico
- Party: New Progressive Party (PNP)
- Education: Interamerican University of Puerto Rico (BBA)

José Luis Jiménez Negrón (born June 4, 1954) is a Puerto Rican politician affiliated with the New Progressive Party (PNP). He was a member of the Puerto Rico House of Representatives from 1997 to 2013 representing District 26.

== Early years and studies ==
José Luis Jiménez Negrón was born in Orocovis on June 4, 1954. He graduated from José Rojas Cortés High School in his hometown.

Jiménez received a Bachelor's degree in Business Management from the Interamerican University of Puerto Rico.

== Professional career ==
Before entering politics, Jiménez worked as a manager and supervisor of a farming enterprise. He then worked as Sub-director of the Head Start Program in Orocovis, where he supervised programs, budget, and proposals. After that, he served as Legislative Consultant for the House of Representatives of Puerto Rico.

== Political career ==
Jiménez began his political career in 1996, when he ran for District 26 Representative at the general election that year. He was reelected three times (2000, 2004, 2008). During his last term, he was a member of the Commissions of Treasury, Agriculture, Economic Development, Commerce, Transportation, and others.

In 2012, Jiménez lost his chance for reelection, when he was defeated by Urayoán Hernández at the PNP primaries.
