= Celia V. Monrouzeau Martínez =

Puerto Rican politician

Member of the Puerto Rico House of Representatives from the 14th District
- In office January 2, 1977 – January 2, 1981

Personal details
- Born: January 15, 1944 Hatillo, Puerto Rico
- Died: January 30, 2006 (aged 62)
- Party: New Progressive Party (PNP)
- Children: 1
- Education: Pontifical Catholic University of Puerto Rico (B.Ed.)

Celia V. Monrouzeau Martínez was a Puerto Rican female politician from the New Progressive Party (PNP) who served as member of the House of Representatives of Puerto Rico for the 14th District.

== Early life and education ==
Celia Virginia Monrouzeau Martínez was born on January 15, 1944, in Hatillo, Puerto Rico. She earned a bachelor's degree in education from the Pontifical Catholic University of Puerto Rico.

== Politics ==
She began in politics in the 1976 election and was elected to 14th district. During the four-year term she was the only woman in the House of Representatives and served as alternate spokesperson for the New Progressive Party. She was not reelected in the 1980 elections, and returned to teaching.

Governor Rafael Hernández Colón of the opposing Popular Democratic Party invited Celia V. Monrouzeau Martínez to collaborate as an advisor on social welfare projects.

== Legacy ==
A passive park in Hatillo was named in her honor.
