= Ángel Morey Noble =

Puerto Rican politician

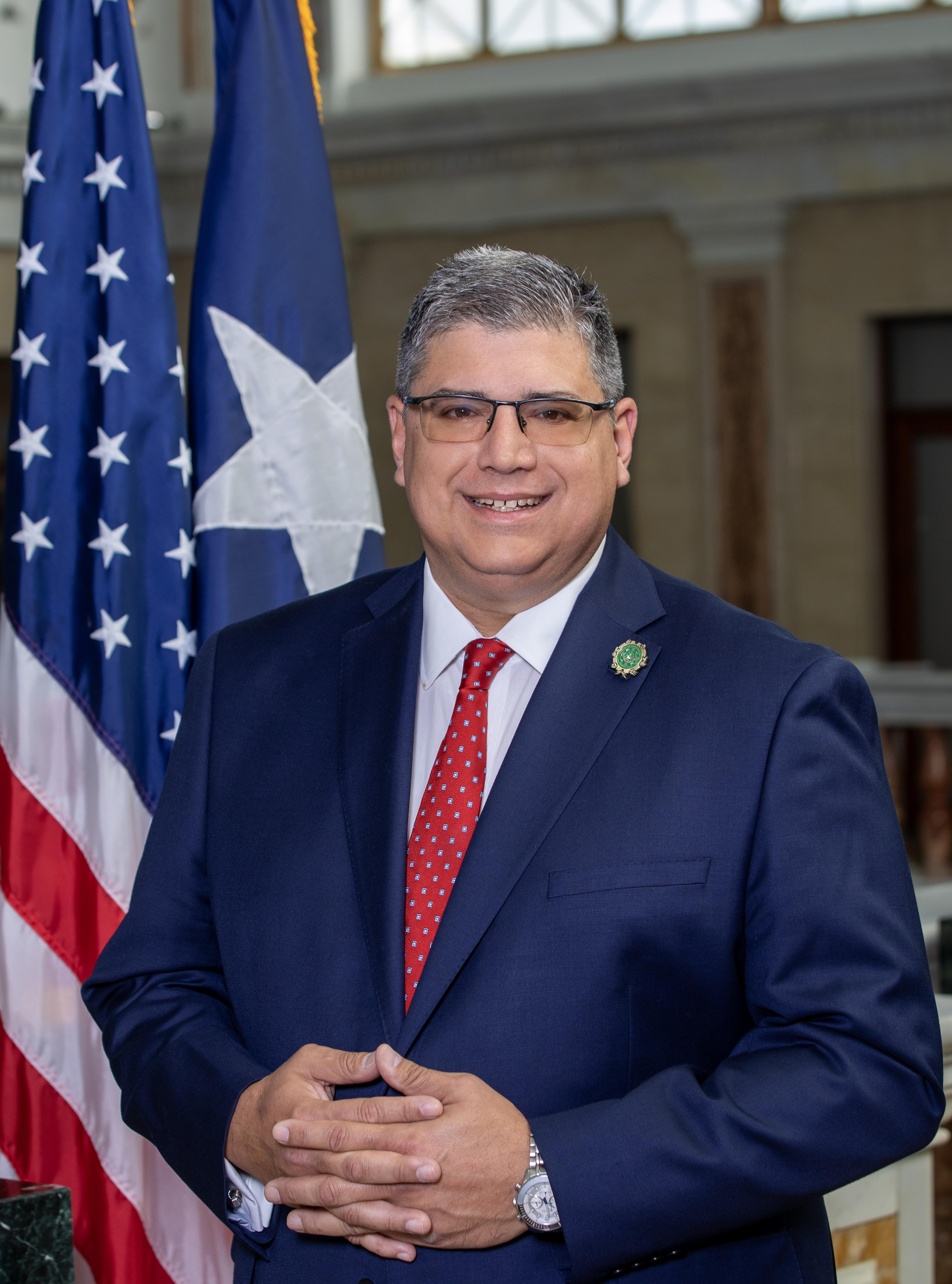

Member 31st House of Representatives of Puerto Rico for District 6
- Incumbent
- Assumed office June 1, 2021
- Preceded by: Antonio “Tony” Soto

Personal details
- Party: PNP

Ángel Morey Noble is a Puerto Rican politician affiliated with the New Progressive Party (PNP) elected to the House of Representatives of Puerto Rico for the 6th district.

== Politics ==
Originally elected as a municipal assemblyman for Guaynabo he was later elected to the 31st House of Representatives of Puerto Rico in a special election to substitute Antonio “Tony” Soto, to represent District 6. He was appointed vice president of the Banking, Insurance, and Credit Working Group of the National Hispanic Caucus of State Legislators (NHCSL) for the 2026–2027 term.

He is the son of former Secretary of State Angel Morey. He is a member of Phi Sigma Alpha.
