= Party leaders of the House of Representatives of Puerto Rico =

Two Puerto Rican Representatives who are elected

The majority and minority leaders of the House of Representatives of Puerto Rico are two Puerto Rican Representatives who are elected by the party conferences that hold the majority and the minority respectively. These leaders serve as the chief House spokespeople for their parties and manage and schedule the legislative and executive business of the House. By rule, the Presiding Officer gives the Majority Leader priority in obtaining recognition to speak on the floor of the House.

== Majority leaders ==
New Progressive Party Popular Democratic Party
Portrait	Name	Took office	Left office	Party	Majority Whip
	Ernesto Ramos Antonini	1941	1943	PPD	
	Ernesto Ramos Antonini	1945	1949	PPD	
	Hernán Padilla Ramírez	1969	1973	PNP	
	José R. Morales	1973	1977	PPD	Olga Cruz de Nigaglioni
	David Urbina Urbina	1977	1978	PNP	Celia V. Monrouzeau Martínez
	José N. Granados Navedos	1978	1982	PNP	Celia V. Monrouzeau Martínez
	José R. Jarabo Alvarez	1982	1985	PPD	
	Presby Santiago García	1985	1993	PPD	Héctor López Galarza
	Néstor Aponte Hernández	1993	1997	PNP	Ángel Cintrón García
	Pedro Figueroa Costas	1997	1999	PNP	Edwin Mundo Ríos
	Ángel Cintrón García	1999	2001	PNP	Iris M. Ruiz Class
	Roberto Maldonado Vélez	2001	2004	PPD	Héctor Ferrer Ríos
	Iris M. Ruiz Class	2005	2009	PNP	María L. Ramos Rivera
	Rolando Crespo Arroyo	2009	2011	PNP	Ángel Pérez Otero
	Carlos J. Méndez Núñez	2011	2013	PNP	Ángel Pérez Otero
	Charlie Hernández	2013	2017	PPD	Carlos Bianchi Angleró
	Gabriel Rodríguez Aguiló	2017	2021	PNP	Urayoán Hernández
	Angel Matos García	2021	2025	PPD	Roberto Rivera Ruiz de Porras
	José Torres Zamora	2025	present	PNP	Wilson Román

== Minority leaders ==
Liberal Party New Progressive Party Popular Democratic Party Puerto Rican Independence Party
Portrait	Name	Took office	Left office	Party	Whip
	Manuel Martínez Dávila	1933	1934	Liberal	
	Ernesto Ramos Antonini	1934	1937	Liberal	
	Ernesto Ramos Antonini	1943	1945	PPD	
	Leopoldo Figueroa Carreras	1950	1967	Statehood Republican	Baldomero Roig Vélez
	Baldomero Roig Vélez	1967	1969	Statehood Republican	
	Luis E. Ramos Yordán	1969	1973	PPD	Olga Cruz de Nigaglioni
	Angel Viera Martínez	1973	1977	PNP	Hernán Padilla Ramírez
	Severo Colberg Ramírez	1977	1981	PPD	José R. Jarabo Alvarez
		1981	1982	PPD	
	Angel Viera Martínez	1982	1983	PNP	José N. Granados Navedos
	José N. Granados Navedos	1983	1989	PNP	Edison Misla Aldarondo
	Edison Misla Aldarondo	1989	1993	PNP	Carlos J. López Nieves
	Alfonso López Chaar	1993	1994	PPD	Rolando Ortiz Velázquez
	José E. Arrarás Mir	1994	1995	PPD	Severo E. Colberg Toro
	Severo E. Colberg Toro	1995	1997	PPD	Ferdinand Lugo González
	Aníbal Acevedo Vilá	1997	2001	PPD	Roberto Cruz Rodríguez
	Víctor García San Inocencio	1997	2009	PIP	N/A
	Edison Misla Aldarondo	2001	2002	PNP	Iris M. Ruiz Class
	Aníbal Vega Borges	2002	2005	PNP	Iris M. Ruiz Class
	Héctor Ferrer Ríos	2005	2012	PPD	Luis R. Torres Cruz
	Luis R. Torres Cruz	2012	2013	PPD	
	Jenniffer González	2013	2017	PNP	Johnny Méndez
	Tatito Hernández	2017	2021	PPD	
	Johnny Méndez	2021	2025	PNP	
	Héctor Ferrer Santiago	2025	present	PPD	

== Assistant party leaders ==
Majority Whips

- 2013–2013: Eduardo Ferrer
- 2013–2017: Carlos Bianchi Angleró
- 2017–2021: Urayoán Hernández
- 2021-2024: Roberto Rivera Ruiz de Porras
- 2024-Present: Wilson Román

Minority Whips

- 2013–2016: Johnny Méndez
- 2016-2021: Ramón Luis Cruz
- 2021-Present: Gabriel Rodríguez Aguiló
