= Luis Raúl Torres Cruz =

Puerto Rican politician (born 1960)

Luis R.T. Cruz
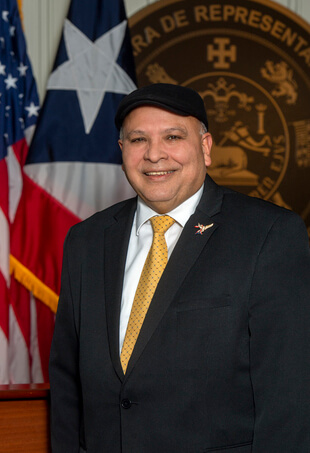
- Torres in 2021

Minority Leader of the Puerto Rico House of Representatives
- In office February 29, 2012 – January 2, 2013
- Preceded by: Héctor Ferrer
- Succeeded by: Jenniffer González

Minority Whip of the Puerto Rico House of Representatives
- In office January 2, 2008 – February 29, 2012
- Preceded by: Iris Miriam Ruíz
- Succeeded by: Iris Miriam Ruíz

Member of the Puerto Rico House of Representatives from the 2nd District
- In office January 2, 2001 – December 31, 2024
- Preceded by: Edwin Mundo
- Succeeded by: Ricardo Rey Ocasio Ramos

Personal details
- Born: Luis Raúl Torres Cruz; May 27, 1960 (age 66) San Juan, Puerto Rico
- Party: Independent (2022-present)
- Other political affiliations: Popular Democratic Party (PPD) (1995-2022)
- Children: 2
- Education: Interamerican University of Puerto Rico (BBA)

Luis Raúl Torres Cruz (born May 27, 1960) is a Puerto Rican independent politician formerly affiliated with the Popular Democratic Party (PPD). He is a member of the Puerto Rico House of Representatives since 2000, representing the 2nd District. He served as Minority Leader for the PDP in the House of Representatives from 2012 to 2013, following the resignation of Héctor Ferrer.

== Early years and studies ==
Luis Raúl Torres Cruz was born in San Juan on May 27, 1960.

Torres began his studies at the University of Puerto Rico at Bayamón with the intention to complete a Bachelor's degree in Political Science. However, he transferred later to the Interamerican University of Puerto Rico where he completed a bachelor's degree in Business Management.

== Professional career ==
From 1981 to 1982, Torres worked as Administrative Officer of the Public Relations Division of the Teachers Association of Puerto Rico.

== Political career ==
Torres first ran for the House at the 1996 general elections, but lost to Edwin Mundo from the PNP. He ran again on 2000 and won, defeating Mundo this time.

After being elected again in 2008, Torres was selected by his party as the House Minority Whip. In February 2012, he succeeded Héctor Ferrer as Minority Leader after Ferrer's resignation.

Torres was reelected in 2012 and again in 2016 and 2020. On 4 May 2022 Torres Cruz notified Popular Democratic Party leadership that he would be breaking from the PDP delegation and continue as an independent representative.

== Personal life ==
Torres has been a member of the Mita Congregation since his childhood.

Torres is single, but has two daughters from a previous marriage. In 1993, he was involved in a case of domestic abuse against his then-wife and, despite not being convicted, he completed a rehabilitation program. Torres himself said in an interview that he has "an excellent relationship" with his former wife.

House of Representatives of Puerto Rico
Preceded by Edwin Mundo	Member of the Puerto Rico House of Representatives from the 2nd district 2001–2024	Succeeded by Ricardo Rey Ocasio Ramos
Preceded by Héctor Ferrer	Minority Leader of the Puerto Rico House of Representatives; 2012-2013	Succeeded by Jenniffer González
Preceded by Iris Miriam Ruíz	Minority Whip of the Puerto Rico House of Representatives; 2005–2012	Succeeded by Iris Miriam Ruíz
