= Orlando Aponte Rosario =

Puerto Rican politician

Member of the Puerto Rico House of Representatives from the 26th District
- In office January 2, 2021 – June 28, 2023
- Preceded by: Urayoán Hernández

Personal details
- Born: November 24, 1984 (age 41) Aibonito, Puerto Rico
- Party: Popular Democratic Party (PPD)
- Education: University of Puerto Rico at Cayey (BA); University of Puerto Rico School of Law (JD)

Orlando Aponte Rosario is a Puerto Rican politician affiliated with the Popular Democratic Party (PPD). He was elected to the Puerto Rico House of Representatives in 2020 to represent District 26.

== Early life and education ==
Took his most of his early education at public schools in Barranquitas, Puerto Rico. He completed his bachelor's degree in Social Sciences, with a concentration in Political Science, at the University of Puerto Rico at Cayey. In addition, during his baccalaureate he took courses in economics and finance at Murray State University, in Kentucky. In 2010 earned a Juris Doctor from the University of Puerto Rico School of Law. Started law practice at same year.

== Political career ==
Orlando Aponte Rosario was elected in the November 2020 election for the 26th district Puerto Rico House of Representatives. He was the chair of the Legal Commission.
