= Jesús Santa Rodríguez =

Puerto Rican politician (born 1964)

Member of the Puerto Rico House of Representatives from the 31st District
- In office January 2, 2013 – December 31, 2024
- Preceded by: Sylvia Rodríguez Aponte
- Succeeded by: Vilmarie Peña Davila

Member of the Municipal Assembly of Caguas, Puerto Rico
- In office 2004-2012

Personal details
- Born: October 20, 1964 (age 61) San Lorenzo, Puerto Rico
- Party: Popular Democratic Party (PPD)
- Education: University of Puerto Rico at Mayaguez (BEng)
- Profession: Chemical Engineer

Jesús Santa Rodríguez (born 1964) is a Puerto Rican politician affiliated with the Popular Democratic Party (PPD). He was elected to the Puerto Rico House of Representatives in 2012 to represent District 31.

He graduated from High School at Colegio Bautista in Caguas. Completed a Bachelor of Science and Engineering with concentration in Chemical Engineering in 1987 at the University of Puerto Rico at Mayaguez. Has postgraduate studies in Economics from the University of Puerto Rico.
