= Sol Y. Higgins Cuadrado =

Puerto Rican politician

Member of the Puerto Rico House of Representatives from the 35th district
- Incumbent
- Assumed office January 2, 2021

Personal details
- Born: September 10, 1976 (age 50) Humacao, Puerto Rico
- Party: PPD
- Other political affiliations: Democratic
- Education: Interamerican University of Puerto Rico (BBA)

Sol Y. Higgins Cuadrado is a Puerto Rican politician. She serves as a member for the 35th district of the Puerto Rico House of Representatives.

== Early years and education ==
She completed her primary studies at the San Benito Catholic School in Humacao and then obtained her Four-Year Higher School Diploma at the San Antonio Abad School also in Humacao. Later, he continued her university studies at the Metropolitan Campus of the Interamerican University of Puerto Rico where she completed her Bachelor’s Degree in Business Administration with a concentration in the area of Marketing.

== Public service ==
In 2003, he began his career in public service at the Puerto Rico Youth Affairs Office, which was directed by Dr. David Bernier. In 2004, she directed the Youth Area of the Southeast Consortium in the municipality of Humacao and in 2005, she rose to the position of director of said Consortium, managing it until 2011; who becomes Special Assistant to Mayor Marcelo Trujillo Panisse, in that year, he was commissioned to operate the Jorge Franceschi Diagnostic and Treatment Center of the Autonomous Municipality of Humacao until 2020.
