= Héctor Ferrer Santiago =

Puerto Rican politician (born 1994)

Héctor Ferrer
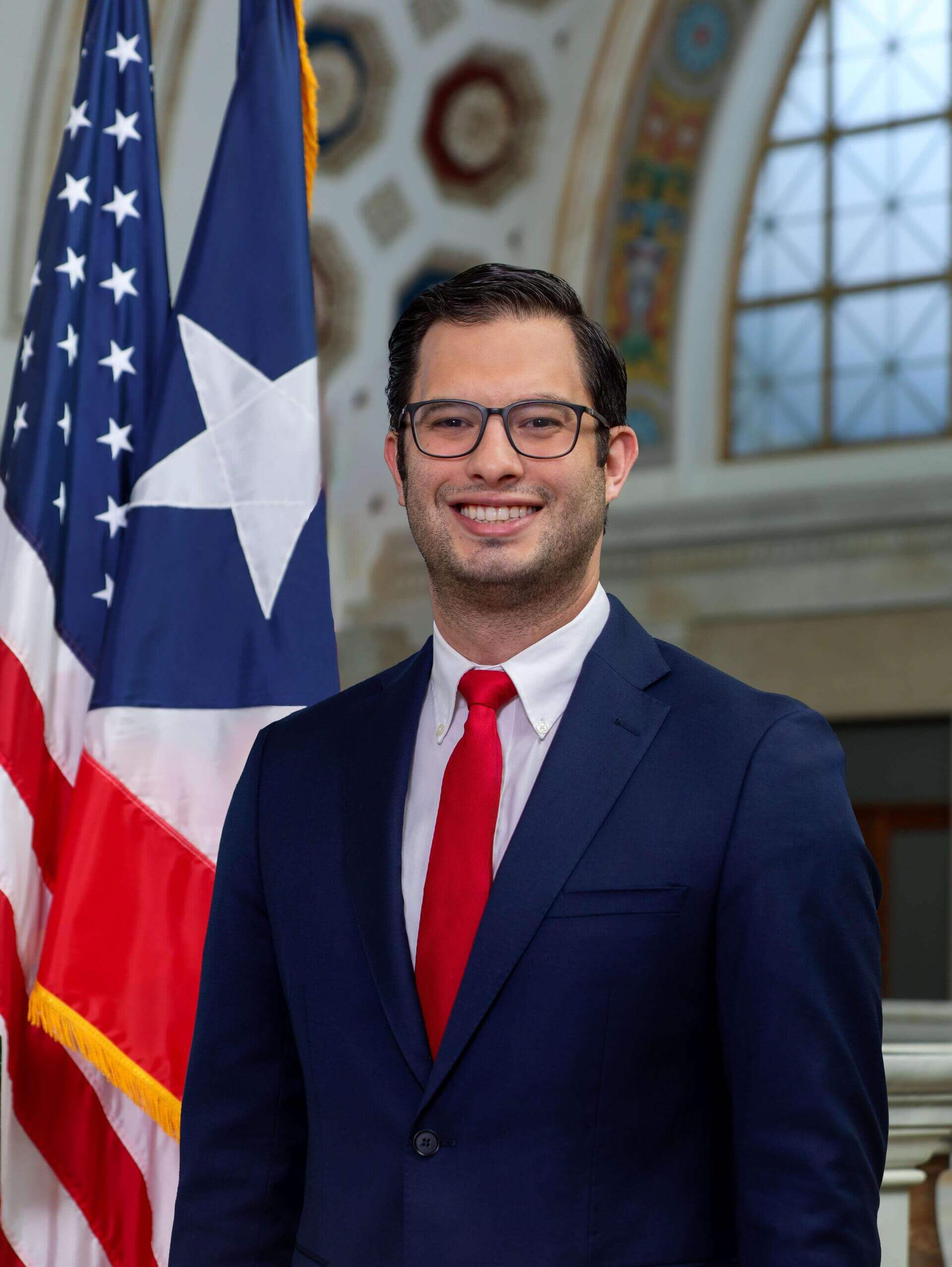

Minority Leader of the Puerto Rico House of Representatives
- Incumbent
- Assumed office January 2, 2025
- Preceded by: Carlos Johnny Méndez

Member of the Puerto Rico House of Representatives from the at-large district
- Incumbent
- Assumed office January 2, 2021

Personal details
- Born: Héctor Enrique Ferrer Santiago; September 23, 1994 (age 32) San Juan, Puerto Rico
- Party: Popular Democratic
- Relatives: Héctor Ferrer (father)
- Education: Interamerican University of Puerto Rico (BA, JD)

Héctor Enrique Ferrer Santiago (born September 23, 1994, in San Juan, Puerto Rico) is a Puerto Rican politician. He serves in the Puerto Rico House of Representatives as the minority whip for the Popular Democratic Party.

== Personal life ==
Santiago was born on September 23, 1994, in San Juan, Puerto Rico. He is the son of former legislator and Popular Democratic Party (PPD) president Héctor Jose Ferrer Ríos and teacher Sonia Marie Santiago González. He completed elementary and intermediate studies at Colegio Marista in Manatí. He initially pursued his higher-level studies at Cupeyville School in San Juan and later at Boulder Creek High School in New River, Arizona.

Santiago works as a lawyer. In 2018, he received his bachelor degree in political science from the Interamerican University of Puerto Rico and a Juris Doctor from the Interamerican University of Puerto Rico School of Law, and in 2019 he became authorized to practice law in Puerto Rico.

He married his wife, Alondra Laclaustra, on February 14, 2026.

== Political career ==
Santiago was first elected in the 2020 Puerto Rico House of Representatives election, where he was elected as one of 11 members at-large. He received 11.64% of the vote, the most of any candidate in that year's at-large election.

Santiago was reelected in 2024 with 15.32% of the vote as one of 13 at-large members. On November 14, following the election, PPD president Jesús Manuel Ortiz announced that Santiago would be the minority whip for the PPD in the upcoming legislative session.

House of Representatives of Puerto Rico
Preceded by Carlos Johnny Méndez	Minority Leader of the Puerto Rico House of Representatives; 2025–present	Incumbent
