= Luis Ortiz Lugo =

Puerto Rican politician

Luis "Narmito" Ortiz Lugo

Member of the Puerto Rico House of Representatives from the 30th District
- In office January 2, 2013 – December 31, 2024
- Preceded by: Jorge Ramos Peña
- Succeeded by: Fernándo Sanabria

Personal details
- Born: October 19, 1968 (age 57) Guayama, Puerto Rico
- Party: Popular Democratic Party (PPD)
- Other political affiliations: Democratic
- Education: Interamerican University of Puerto Rico (BBA)

Luis R. "Narmito" Ortiz Lugo is a Puerto Rican politician affiliated with the Popular Democratic Party (PPD). He was elected to the Puerto Rico House of Representatives in 2012 to represent District 30

== Early life and education ==
Graduated from Rafael López Landrón, where he studied refrigeration technician. He holds a Bachelor's degree in Business Administration with a specialty in Management from the Interamerican University of Puerto Rico, Metropolitan Campus.

== Career ==
In his work experience he served as a Network Administration Services Officer in the Puerto Rico Aqueduct and Sewerage Authority where he worked for 23 years and in different positions. He was inducted into the Guayama Sports Hall of Fame for winning the championship in sports as the owner of the Marlins de Barrancas Baseball Class A. Was elected in the 2012 elections to the Puerto Rico House of Representatives to represent District 30. He is currently chairman of the Emergency Preparedness, Reconstruction and Reorganization Commission and the Southeast Region Commission.

== Family ==
Is married to Judith Alvarado Ruiz and has 2 sons.
