= José Bernardo Márquez =

Puerto Rican politician

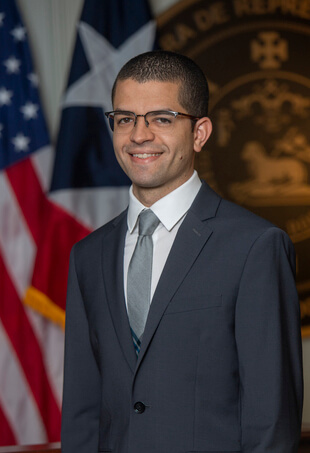

At-Large Member of the Puerto Rico House of Representatives
- In office January 2, 2021 – January 2, 2025

Personal details
- Born: September 11, 1989 (age 37)
- Party: Citizens' Victory Movement (MVC)
- Education: University of Puerto Rico, Río Piedras Campus (B.A. and J.D.)

José Bernardo Márquez (born September 11, 1989) is a Puerto Rican attorney, activist, and politician. He was elected to the Puerto Rico House of Representatives in the 2020 general election, for the Citizens' Victory Movement party.

== Biography and professional career ==
José Bernardo Márquez was born on September 11, 1989. He is the son of current mayor of Toa Baja Bernardo Márquez García, who assumed office in 2017. José Bernardo completed a bachelor's degree in sociology and a Juris doctor at the University of Puerto Rico, Río Piedras Campus.

Márquez has a private practice, and is a member and founder of Dimensión Legal, LLC. He also works as a university professor in sociology and law. Márquez also offers workshops and frequently contributes as a columnist to newspapers and publications like El Nuevo Día, Revista Jurídica UPR, and Microjuris. He is also a community leader in his hometown of Toa Baja through the educational project "No lo dejes caer", the Abraham Rosa Marathon, and the Disciples of Christ Church.

== Political career ==
As a public servant, Márquez has served as a legal advisor of government branches like the Statistics Institute of Puerto Rico and the Supreme Court of Puerto Rico, where he has worked with President Maite Oronoz Rodríguez.

Márquez represents the Citizens' Victory Movement party. He presented his availability to the House of Representatives of Puerto Rico after Néstor Duprey retired his candidacy. Márquez won the nomination on June 20, 2020, over environmentalist Mirna Conty and syndicalist César García. He arrived in sixth place at the general election, earning a seat in the House.
