= Ángel A. Fourquet Cordero =

Puerto Rican politician

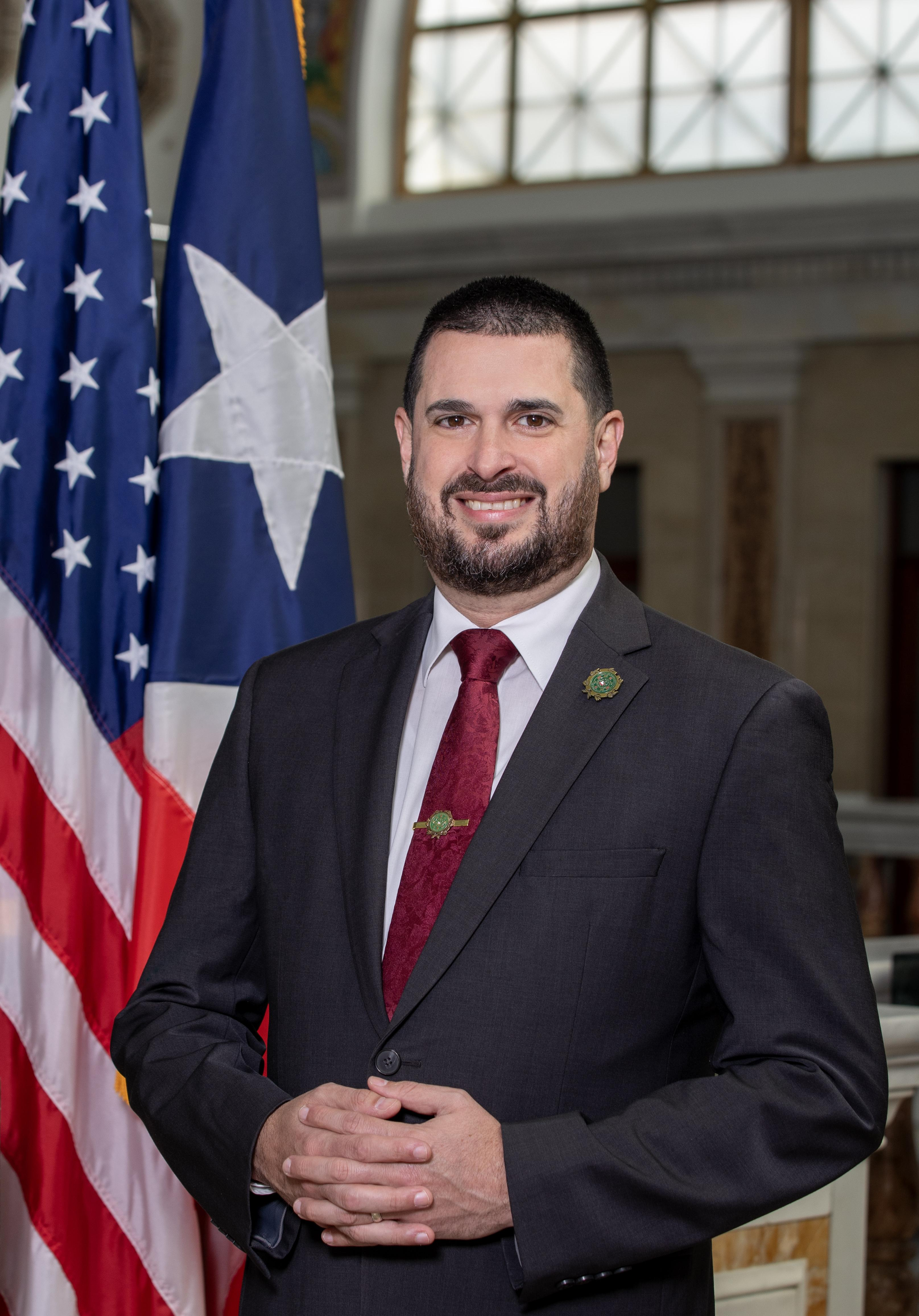

Member of the Puerto Rico House of Representatives from the 24th district
- Incumbent
- Assumed office January 2, 2021

Personal details
- Party: PPD
- Education: Pontifical Catholic University of Puerto Rico (MBA); Pontifical Catholic University of Puerto Rico School of Law (JD)

Ángel A. Fourquet Cordero is a Puerto Rican politician. He serves as a member for the 24th district of the Puerto Rico House of Representatives.
