= Néstor A. Alonso Vega =

Puerto Rican politician (born 1985)

Néstor Alonso Vega

At-Large Member of the Puerto Rico House of Representatives
- In office January 2, 2017 – November 10, 2020

Personal details
- Born: June 26, 1985 (age 41) San Juan, Puerto Rico
- Party: New Progressive Party (PNP)
- Education: University of Puerto Rico, Río Piedras Campus (B.A.); Interamerican University of Puerto Rico (J.D.)

Néstor A. Alonso Vega (born June 26, 1985) is a Puerto Rican politician. He was elected to the Puerto Rico House of Representatives on the 2016 general election. Alonso was arrested by the FBI in November 2020 on 9 charges of corruption for numerous crimes, which include theft and money laundering, perpetrated specifically through a kickback scheme. Alonso resigned from his position on November 10, 2020.
