= José Hernández Concepción =

Puerto Rican politician

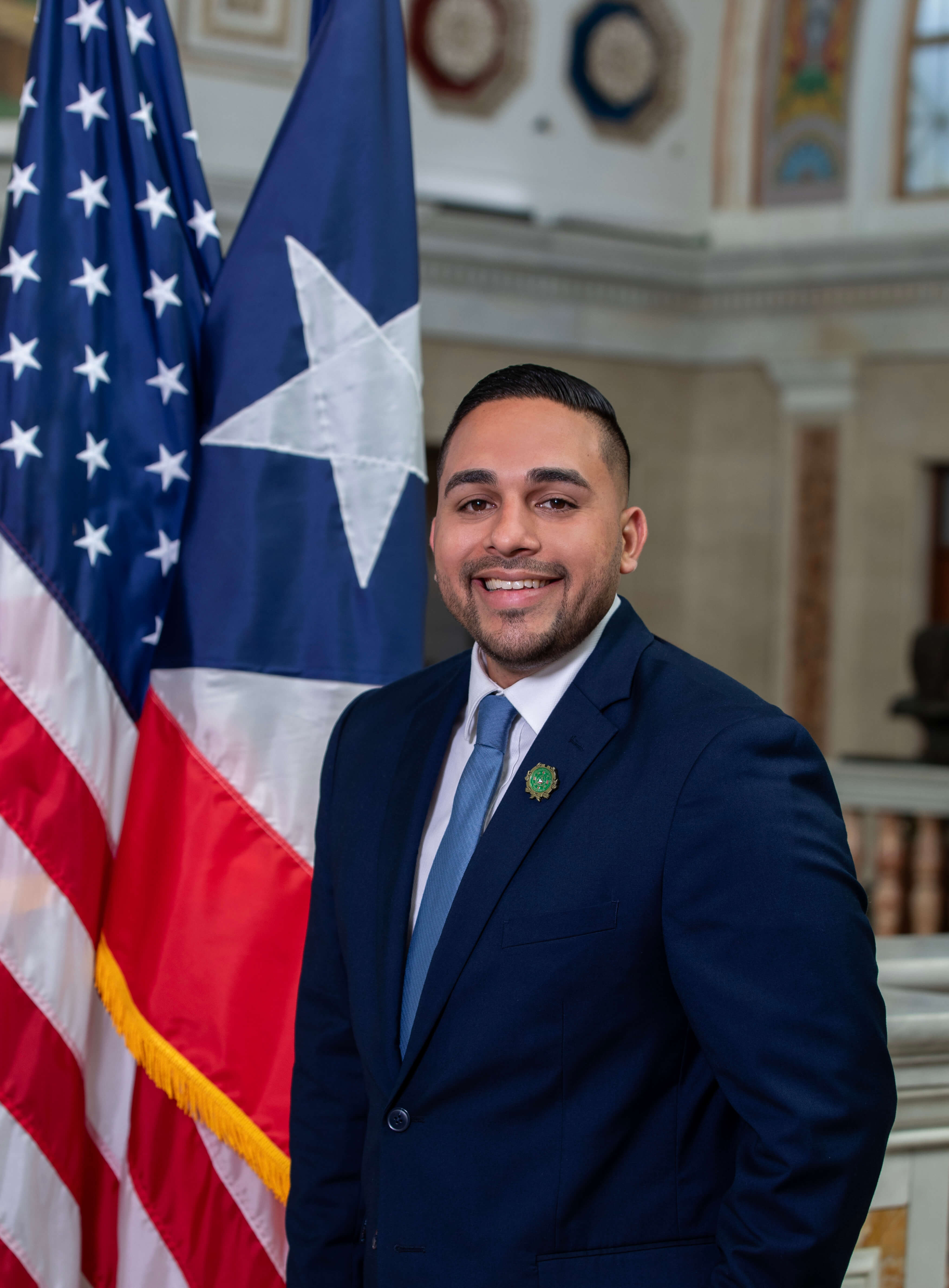

Member of the Puerto Rico House of Representatives from the 3rd district
- Incumbent
- Assumed office December 12, 2022
- Preceded by: Juan Morales Rodríguez

Personal details
- Party: New Progressive Party (PNP)
- Other political affiliations: Democratic

José Hernández Concepción is a Puerto Rican politician. He serves as a member for the 3rd district of the Puerto Rico House of Representatives.
