= Proyecto Dignidad =

Puerto Rican political party

Project Dignity Proyecto Dignidad
- President: Nilda Pérez
- Founded: March 24, 2019; 7 years ago
- Headquarters: San Juan, Puerto Rico
- Ideology: Christian democracy Anti-corruption; Right-wing populism
- Political position: Centre-right to right-wing
- Colors: Cyan
- Seats in the Senate: 0 / 27
- Seats in the House of Representatives: 1 / 51
- Municipalities: 1 / 78
- Seats in the U.S. House: 0 / 1

Website
- www.proyectodignidad.org

Proyecto Dignidad (lit. 'Project Dignity', PD) is a Puerto Rican political party founded in 2019. In the 2020 general election it ran on a Christian democratic and anti-corruption platform.

== History ==
Imagotype of Proyecto Dignidad of Puerto Rico

Project Dignity was first announced on March 24, 2019. On January 22, 2020, the party was officially certified as the 5th political party running in the 2020 general election. Afterwards in May, César Vázquez Muñiz, cardiologist; and Ada Norah Henriquez, attorney at law, were nominated for Governor and Resident Commissioner respectively. In May 2025, the Puerto Rico Supreme Court upheld the decision to exclude Project Dignity from the Puerto Rico State Election Commission.

=== 2020 ===
On November 3, 2020, the party contested its first election. For the campaign, the party did not run candidates for every office. They opted to run for the governorship and resident commissary, as well as 1 candidate at-large for both legislative chambers. They also ran candidates in some representative and senatorial districts. Similarly, they only had a candidate in the mayoral race for San Juan, although they had previously certified Edgardo Cruz Vélez as candidate for Guánica, who did not win the race as an independent candidate after a vote recount. While their candidates for Governor and Resident Commissioner came 5th and 4th respectively, they won 1 at-large seat in both the House of Representatives and Senate.

== Ideology ==
Project Dignity intends to lead the process of defining the political status of Puerto Rico but does not endorse a specific territorial option.

The party advocates for declaring pornography a public health issue and imposing restrictions on abortion permitted within the legal framework of Roe v. Wade. After Roe v. Wade was overturned in 2022 by the Supreme Court, the party presented a bill that would limit access to abortions to those pregnant for less than about six weeks.

In the 2021 session, representative Lissie Burgos of the party attempted to introduce a bill to ban the use of hormone therapy on minors but it was defeated in committee. Additionally, the party also brought in House Bill 764 for review that would restrict athletes to participate in sports teams of their birth assigned gender.

The party's candidate for mayor of San Juan in 2020, Nelson Rosario Rodríguez, ran on a self-described social market economy model, seeking to facilitate market activity while allowing for regulation in cases of negative external effects and to promote his policy agenda San Juan Somos su gente.

Both their Resident commissioner candidate Viviana Ramírez Morales and gubernatorial candidates in 2024 Javier Jiménez endorsed Donald Trump in the 2024 presidential election.

== Officials ==
=== Senate ===
- Joanne Rodríguez Veve (2021–2025)

=== Representatives ===
- Lisie Burgos Muñiz (2021–present)

== Electoral history ==
=== Gubernatorial elections ===
Election year	PD Candidate	Votes	Vote %	+/-	Outcome of election
2020	César Vázquez Muñiz	85,211	6.90 / 100	▲6.90%	Lost
2024	Javier Jiménez Pérez	81,369	6.38 / 100	▼0.52%	Lost

=== Resident Commissioner elections ===
Election year	PD Candidate	Votes	Vote %	+/-	Outcome of election
2020	Ada Norah Henriquez	94,059	7.84 / 100	▲7.84%	Lost
2024	Viviana Ramírez Morales	60,512	4.96 / 100	▼2.85%	Lost

=== Legislative elections ===
House of Representatives
Election year	# of overall seats won	+/–
2020	1 / 51	▲1
2024	1 / 51	Steady

Senate
Election year	# of overall seats won	+/–
2020	1 / 27	▲1
2024	1 / 51	Steady

== Party leaders ==
- César Augusto Vázquez Muñiz — founder of PD, president of the party and candidate for governor in 2020
- Ada Norah Henriquez — candidate for resident commissioner in 2020
- Joanne Rodríguez Veve — Senator for PD since 2021
- Lisie Janet Burgos Muñiz — representative for PD since 2021
- Javier Jiménez — Mayor of San Sebastián, Puerto Rico since 2005, PD member since 2023

== See also ==
- Syncretic politics
