= Denis Márquez Lebrón =

Puerto Rican politician

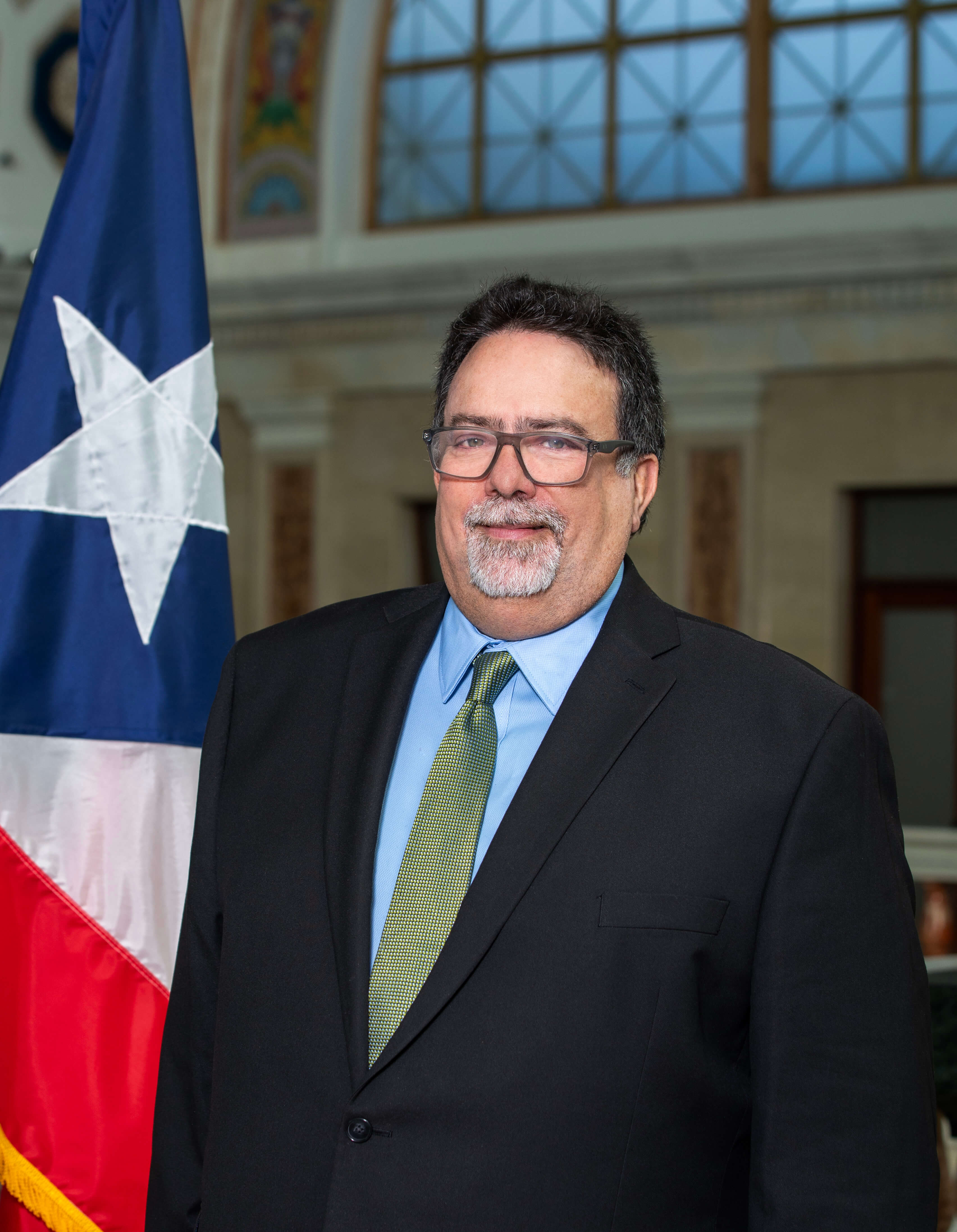

Member of the Puerto Rico House of Representatives from the at-large district
- Incumbent
- Assumed office January 2, 2017

Personal details
- Born: October 5, 1963 (age 62) Gurabo, Puerto Rico
- Party: PIP
- Education: University of Puerto Rico (BS); Interamerican University of Puerto Rico School of Law (JD)

Denis Márquez Lebrón is a Puerto Rican politician. He serves as a member for the at-large district of the Puerto Rico House of Representatives.

== Education ==
Denis Márquez Lebrón (born October 5, 1963) began his higher education journey at the University of Puerto Rico, Río Piedras Campus, after being admitted in 1981. He earned a bachelor's degree in Social Sciences with a concentration in Labor Relations. Later, he pursued graduate studies in Public Administration. Denis graduated magna cum laude from the Law School at the Interamerican University of Puerto Rico School of Law in 1992, where he also founded the Law Students' Cooperative.

== Career ==
Denis Márquez Lebrón has had a distinguished career in law, education, and political activism. From 1987 to 1992, he worked as a professor at the Polytechnic University of Puerto Rico. He later taught courses in Business Law, Civil Law, and Social Sciences at various universities in Puerto Rico from 1999 to 2011. His professional legal career includes advising the legislative delegation of the Puerto Rican Independence Party (PIP) from 1993 to 1996. Along with his friend and fellow PIP advisor, José Torres Valentín, he entered private practice, specializing in labor law. He has represented several labor unions and contributed to the legal representation of children with special needs in the Rosa Lydia Vélez class action lawsuit.

In 2008–2009, Denis served on the Board of Directors of Legal Services of Puerto Rico, an organization that provides legal assistance to low-income individuals in civil cases. He has also been an observer for the Bar Association of Puerto Rico and has been involved in various community and recreational organizations.

Denis has held several important positions within the PIP, including municipal legislator and president of the Gurabo Committee, Electoral Commissioner for Precinct 2 of San Juan, chair of the Evaluation Commission after the 2008 elections, and Secretary of Political Education. He was also part of the legal team that represented the PIP in the “folders case,” securing a significant legal victory where, for the first time, discrimination against a political institution was recognized in Puerto Rican jurisdiction. In addition, he has represented the PIP in many other legal matters.

== Personal life ==
Denis is originally from Gurabo and is the youngest of four siblings. He grew up in the Celada neighborhood of his hometown, where he attended public schools. His involvement in politics and activism began early, motivated by his first contact with the Puerto Rican Independence Party through his local community. He is the author of the essay book De Celada a San Juan (2013), reflecting on his personal experiences and political journey.

Currently, Denis serves as the Secretary of Political Organization and Spokesperson for the PIP in the Puerto Rican House of Representatives. He was elected as a representative at large in 2016 and re-elected in 2020 and 2024.
