= 28th House of Representatives of Puerto Rico =

In session
- January 2, 2009 – January 1, 2013

Leadership
- Speaker: Jenniffer González
- Speaker pro tem: Gabriel Rodríguez Aguiló
- Majority Leader: Rolando Crespo (2009–2011); Johnny Méndez (2011–2013)
- Majority Whip: Angel Pérez Otero
- Minority Leader: Héctor Ferrer (2009-2012); Luis Raúl Torres (2012)
- Minority Whip: Luis Raúl Torres (2009-2012)

Non-officers

Structure
- Seats: 54 voting members
- Parties represented: PNP; PPD
- Length of term: 4 years

Elections

Legislature
- 16th Legislative Assembly of Puerto Rico

Upper house
- 24th Senate of Puerto Rico

Sessions
- 1st: January 14, 2009 – January 12, 2010
- 2nd: January 13, 2010 – January 11, 2011
- 3rd: January 12, 2011 – January 10, 2012
- 4th: January 11, 2012 – January 8, 2013
- {{{session5}}}: {{{session5start}}} – {{{session5end}}}
- {{{session6}}}: {{{session6start}}} – {{{session6end}}}
- {{{session7}}}: {{{session7start}}} – {{{session7end}}}
- {{{session8}}}: {{{session8start}}} – {{{session8end}}}

The 28th House of Representatives of Puerto Rico was the lower house of the 16th Legislative Assembly of Puerto Rico and met from January 14, 2009, to January 8, 2013. All members were elected in the General Elections of 2008. The House had a majority of members from the New Progressive Party (PNP).

The body was counterparted by the 24th Senate of Puerto Rico in the upper house.

== Composition ==
Affiliation	Party (Shading indicates majority caucus)			Total	
Affiliation	PNP	PPD	PIP	Total	Vacant
End of previous legislature	32	18	1	51	0
Begin	37	16	0	54	1
Latest voting share	72.5%	27.5%			

== Leadership ==
Position	Name	Party	District
Speaker of the House	Jenniffer González Colón	PNP	At-Large
Speaker Pro Tempore	Gabriel Rodríguez Aguiló	PNP	District 13
Majority Leader	Carlos J. Méndez Núñez	PNP	District 36
Majority Whip	Angel Pérez Otero	PNP	District 6
Minority Leader	Luis Raúl Torres Cruz	PPD	District 2
Minority Whip	Vacant	PPD	

== Membership ==
District	Name	Party
1	José López Muñoz	PNP
2	Luis Raúl Torres Cruz	PPD
3	Albita Rivera Ramírez	PNP
4	Liza Fernández Rodríguez (2009-2012); Víctor Parés (2012-2013)	PNP
5	Jorge Navarro Suárez	PNP
6	Angel Perez Otero	PNP
7	Luis Pérez Ortíz	PNP
8	Antonio Silva Delgado	PNP
9	Angel Rodríguez Miranda	PNP
10	Bernardo Márquez García	PNP
11	María Vega Pagán	PNP
12	Héctor Torres Calderón	PNP
13	Gabriel Rodríguez Aguiló	PNP
14	Paula Rodríguez Homs	PNP
15	Arnaldo Jiménez Valle	PNP
16	Iván Rodríguez (2009-2010); Eric Alfaro (2011-2013)	PNP
17	José Rivera Guerra	PNP
18	David Bonilla Cortés	PNP
19	Charlie Hernández	PPD
20	Norman Ramírez Rivera	PNP
21	Lydia Méndez Silva	PPD
22	Waldemar Quiles Rodríguez	PNP
23	Julissa Nolasco Ortíz	PNP
24	Luis León Rodríguez	PNP
25	Víctor Vassallo Anadón	PPD
26	José Jiménez Negrón	PNP
27	José Torres Ramírez	PPD
28	Rafael Rivera Ortega	PNP
29	Pedro Cintrón Rodríguez	PNP
30	Jorge Ramos Peña	PNP
31	Sylvia Rodríguez Aponte	PPD
32	José Varela Fernández	PPD
33	Angel Peña Ramírez	PNP
34	Cristóbal Colón Ruiz	PNP
35	Narden Jaime Espinosa	PPD
36	Carlos Méndez Nuñez	PNP
37	Angel Bulerín Ramos	PNP
38	Eric Correa Rivera	PNP
39	Roberto Rivera Ruiz	PPD
40	Elizabeth Casado Irizarry	PNP
At-Large	José Chico Vega	PNP
At-Large	Rolando Crespo (2009-2011); José E. Meléndez Ortíz (2011-2013)	PNP
At-Large	Jenniffer González Colón	PNP
At-Large	María de Lourdes Ramos Rivera	PNP
At-Large	Iris Miriam Ruíz (2009-2010); José Torres Zamora (2010-2013)	PNP
At-Large	Héctor Ferrer (2009-2012); Eduardo Ferrer (2012-2013)	PPD
At-Large	Jorge Colberg Toro*	PPD
At-Large	Luis Vega Ramos	PPD
At-Large	José F. Aponte Hernández	PNP
At-Large	Carmen Cruz Soto	PPD
At-Large	Luis Farinacci* (2009-2011); Pedro Rodríguez González (2011-2013)	PPD
At-Large	Rafael Hernández Montañez*	PPD
At-Large	Brenda López de Arrarás	PPD
At-Large	Jaime Perelló Borrás	PPD

[*] Elected by Addition (Defeated in elections, but holds a seat because of Section 9 of Article III of the Constitution. See above.)
