= 29th House of Representatives of Puerto Rico =

Session of the Puerto Rico Legislature

In session
- January 2, 2013 – January 1, 2017

Leadership
- Speaker: Jaime Perelló
- Speaker pro tem: Roberto Rivera
- Majority Leader: Charlie Hernández
- Majority Whip: Carlos Bianchi Angleró
- Minority Leader: Jenniffer González
- Minority Whip: Johnny Méndez

Non-officers
- Secretary: Aileen Figueroa
- Sergeant-at-Arms: Norberto Olmeda

Structure
- Seats: 51 voting members
- Parties represented: 28 PPD; 23 PNP
- Length of term: 4 years

Elections
- Last election: November 6, 2012
- Next election: November 8, 2016

Legislature
- 17th Legislative Assembly of Puerto Rico

Upper house
- 25th Senate of Puerto Rico

Sessions
- 1st: January 14, 2013 – June 30, 2013
- 2nd: August 19, 2013 – November 19, 2013
- 3rd: January 13, 2014 – June 30, 2014
- 4th: August 18, 2014 – November 18, 2014
- 5th: January 12, 2015 – June 30, 2015
- 6th: August 17, 2015 – November 17, 2015
- 7th: January 11, 2016 – June 30, 2016
- 8th: August 15, 2016 – November 15, 2016

The 29th House of Representatives of Puerto Rico is the lower house of the 17th Legislative Assembly of Puerto Rico and will meet from January 14, 2013, to January 8, 2017. All members were elected in the General Elections of 2012. The House has a majority of members from the Popular Democratic Party (PPD).

The body is counterparted by the 25th Senate of Puerto Rico in the upper house.

== Composition ==
=== Leadership ===
PPD PNP
Office	Representative	District	Party
Speaker	Jaime Perelló	At-large	PPD
Speaker pro tem	Roberto Rivera Ruíz	District 39	PPD
Majority Leader	Charlie Hernández	At-large	PPD
Majority Whip	Carlos Bianchi Angleró	At-large	PPD
Minority Leader	Jenniffer González	At-large	PNP
Minority Whip	Johnny Méndez	District 36	PNP

=== Non-officers ===
Post	Name
Secretary	Aileen Figueroa
Sergeant-at-Arms	Norberto Olmeda

=== Members ===
PPD PNP
District	Name	Political party
At-large	Brenda López de Arrarás	PPD
At-large	Charlie Hernández	PPD
At-large	Jaime Perelló	PPD
At-large	Luis Vega Ramos	PPD
At-large	Luisa "Piti" Gándara	PPD
At-large	Manuel Natal	PPD
District 2	Luis Raúl Torres	PPD
District 3	Sonia Pacheco	PPD
District 4	José Luis Báez	PPD
District 11	Rafael "Tatito" Hernández	PPD
District 15	César Hernández	PPD
District 16	José "Tony" Rodríguez	PPD
District 17	Armando Franco	PPD
District 19	Efraín de Jesús	PPD
District 20	Carlos Bianchi Angleró	PPD
District 21	Lydia Méndez Silva	PPD
District 23	Nelson Torres Yordán	PPD
District 25	Víctor "Cacho" Vassallo	PPD
District 27	José "Pito" Torres	PPD
District 29	José Aníbal Díaz	PPD
District 30	Luis "Narmito" Ortíz	PPD
District 31	Jesús Santa Rodríguez	PPD
District 32	José "Conny" Varela	PPD
District 34	Ramón Luis Cruz	PPD
District 35	Narden Jaime Espinosa	PPD
District 38	Javier Aponte Dalmau	PPD
District 39	Roberto Rivera Ruíz	PPD
District 40	Ángel Matos García	PPD
At-large	Jenniffer González	PNP
At-large	José Aponte Hernández	PNP
At-large	José "Kikito" Meléndez	PNP
At-large	Lourdes Ramos	PNP
At-large	María Milagros Charbonier	PNP
District 1	José "Nuno" López	PNP
District 5	Jorge Navarro Suárez	PNP
District 6	Antonio "Tony" Soto	PNP
District 7	Luis Pérez Ortíz	PNP
District 8	Yashira Lebrón Rodríguez	PNP
District 9	Ángel "Gary" Rodríguez	PNP
District 10	Pedro Julio Santiago	PNP
District 12	Héctor Torres Calderón	PNP
District 13	Gabriel Rodríguez Aguiló	PNP
District 14	Ricardo Llerandi	PNP
District 18	Ángel Muñoz	PNP
District 22	Waldemar Quiles Rodríguez	PNP
District 24	Luis "Tato" León	PNP
District 26	Urayoán Hernández	PNP
District 28	Rafael "June" Rivera	PNP
District 33	Ángel Peña	PNP
District 36	Carlos "Johnny" Méndez	PNP
District 37	Ángel Bulerín	PNP

=== Changes in membership ===
- January 31, 2013: Jorge Colberg Toro resigns from his position as representative at-large in order to become Secretary of Public Affairs at the Office of the Governor.
- March 21, 2013: Piti Gándara fills the vacancy left by Jorge Colberg Toro.
- July 16, 2013: Eduardo Ferrer resigns from his position as representative at-large while the House is adjourned citing, "situations that cannot be delegated that I cannot leave unattended". (Note: Peña López (2013) "[Ferrer] anunció su dimisión el 1 de julio pasado, y fue efectiva el 16 de julio.") This effectively left both his seat and the Majority Whip —position Ferrer held— vacant for about a month as the House had to wait to begin its ordinary session to replace him since no extraordinary session was invoked in between by neither the governor nor the speaker.
- August 19, 2013: Manuel Natal fills the vacancy left by Eduardo Ferrer as representative at-large for the Popular Democratic Party while Carlos Bianchi Angleró is elected as Majority Whip.
- October 23, 2014: Yashira Lebrón Rodríguez fills the vacancy left by Antonio "Toñito" Silva as representative for District 8 for the New Progressive Party (PNP) after Silva resigns from his position.

== Commissions ==
=== Standing commissions ===
Name	President	Vice President	Secretary
Agriculture, Natural Resources, and Environmental Affairs	César Hernández Alfonzo	Tony Rodriguez Quiles	Lydia Méndez Silva
Calendars and Special Rules of Debate	Charlie Hernández	N/A	N/A
Consumer Affairs and Anti-Monopolistic Practices	Nelson Torres Yordán	Ángel Matos García	Piti Gándara
Cooperatives and Nonprofit Organizations	Sonia Pacheco	José Luis Báez	Carlos Vargas Ferrer
Development of the Metropolitan Region	Luis Raúl Torres Cruz	Sonia Pacheco	José Luis Báez
Development of the Tourism Industry	Ángel Matos García	Efraín de Jesús	Carlos Bianchi Angleró
Education for the Promotion of Arts and Culture	Brenda López de Arrarás	Sonia Pacheco	Piti Gándara
Ethics	Nelson Torres Yordán	N/A	César Hernández Alfonzo
Federal and International Affairs and Veterans' Affairs	vacant	Ángel Matos García	Rafael Hernández Montañez
Government	Conny Varela	José Luis Báez	Nelson Torres Yordán
Health	Lydia Méndez Silva	Piti Gándara	Narden Jaime Espinosa
Housing and Urban Development	Carlos Vargas Ferrer	Armando Franco	Luis Ortíz Lugo
Integrated Development of the Eastern Region	Narden Jaime Espinosa	Ramón Luis Cruz	Javier Aponte Dalmau
Integrated Development of the Northern Region	Armando Franco	César Hernández Alfonzo	Tony Rodríguez Quiles
Integrated Development of the South Center Region	Luis Raúl Torres	Carlos Vargas Ferrer	Jesús Santa Rodríguez
Integrated Development of the Southern Region	Cacho Vassallo	Nelson Torres Yordán	Lydia Méndez Silva
Integrated Development of the Western Region	Efraín de Jesús	Carlos Bianchi Angleró	Tony Rodríguez Quiles
Internal Affairs	Pito Torres	Conny Varela	Luis Raúl Torres Cruz
Judiciary	Luis Vega Ramos	Nelson Torres Yordán	Efraín de Jesús
Labor and Public Service Retirement Systems	Jesús Santa Rodríguez	Rafael Hernández Montañez	Luis Raúl Torres Cruz
Municipal Affairs and Regionalization	Tony Rodríguez Quiles	Narden Jaime Espinosa	Carlos Vargas Ferrer
Public Safety and for the Development of Initiatives Against Crime and Corruption	José Luis Báez	Tony Rodríguez Quiles	Nelson Torres Yordán
Small and Medium Businesses, Commerce, Industry, and Telecommunications	Javier Aponte Dalmau	Luis Raúl Torres	César Hernández Alfonzo
Social Welfare and for the Eradication of Poverty	Piti Gándara	Lydia Méndez Silva	Brenda López de Arrarás
Socioeconomic Development and Planning	Luis Raúl Torres	Javier Aponte Dalmau	Sonia Pacheco
Transportation and Infrastructure	Carlos Bianchi Angleró	Jesús Santa Rodríguez	Ramón Luis Cruz
Treasury and Budget	Tatito Hernández	César Hernández Alfonzo	Conny Varela
Women's Affairs and Equality	Brenda López de Arrarás	Sonia Pacheco	Lydia Méndez Silva
Youth Affairs, Recreation and Sports	Ramón Luis Cruz	Narmito Ortíz	Armando Franco

=== Joint commissions ===
Name	President	Vice President	Secretary
Córdova Fernós Program of Congressional Internships	Jaime Perelló	Charlie Hernández	vacant
Jorge Alberto Ramos Comas Legislative Internship Program	Jaime Perelló	Charlie Hernández	Ramón Luis Cruz
Legislative Donations	Tatito Hernández	César Hernández Alfonzo	Piti Gándara
Legislative Internship Program	Jaime Perelló	N/A	N/A
Pilar Barbosa Internship Program in Education	Jaime Perelló	Charlie Hernández	Brenda López de Arrarás
Public-Private Partnerships of Puerto Rico	Jesús Santa Rodríguez	Efraín de Jesús	Carlos Bianchi Angleró
Special Reports from the Comptroller	Nelson Torres Yordán	César Hernández Alfonzo	Carlos Vargas Ferrer

== Notable legislations ==
- Catch Up Act
- Commonwealth of Puerto Rico Employees Association Act of 2013
- Jobs Now Act
