= 17th Legislative Assembly of Puerto Rico =

Session of the Puerto Rico Legislature

←	16th	18th	→
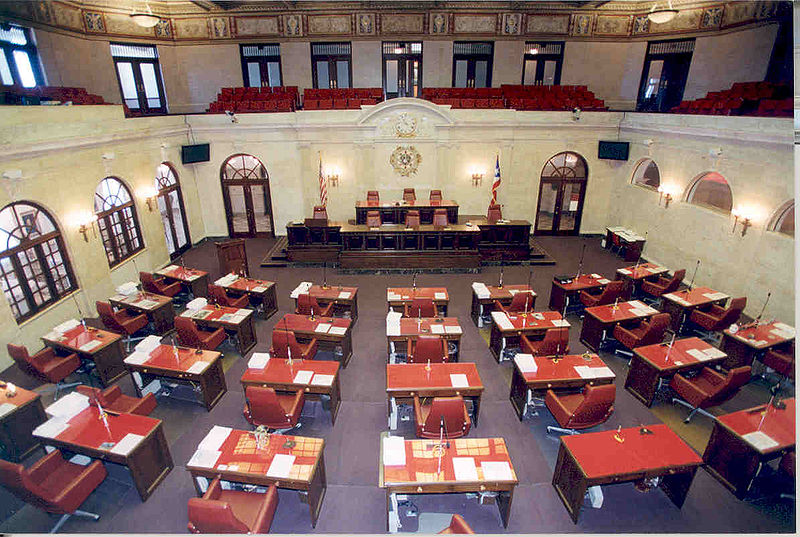

Overview
- Legislative body: Legislative Assembly of Puerto Rico
- Term: January 2, 2013 – January 1, 2017
- Election: November 6, 2012: Senate; House
- Government: García Padilla government

25th Senate
- Members: 27
- President: Eduardo Bhatia
- President pro tem: José Luis Dalmau
- Majority Leader: Aníbal José Torres
- Majority Whip: Rossana López León
- Minority Leader: Larry Seilhamer
- Minority Whip: Carmelo Ríos

29th House of Representatives
- Members: 51
- Speaker: Jaime Perelló
- Speaker pro tem: Roberto Rivera
- Majority Leader: Charlie Hernández
- Majority Whip: Eduardo Ferrer
- Minority Leader: Jenniffer González
- Minority Whip: Carlos Méndez

Sessions
- 1st: January 14, 2013 – June 30, 2013
- 2nd: August 19, 2013 – November 19, 2013
- 3rd: January 13, 2014 – June 30, 2014
- 4th: August 18, 2014 – November 18, 2014
- 5th: January 12, 2015 – June 30, 2015
- 6th: August 17, 2015 – November 17, 2015
- 7th: January 11, 2016 – June 30, 2016
- 8th: August 15, 2016 – November 15, 2016

The 17th Legislative Assembly of Puerto Rico was the 17th session of the Puerto Rican legislature that met from January 14, 2013 until January 1, 2017. All members of the House of Representatives and the Senate were elected in the General Elections of 2012. The House and the Senate both had a majority of members from the Popular Democratic Party (PPD).

The house sessions are composed by the 25th Senate of Puerto Rico and the 29th House of Representatives of Puerto Rico.

== Leadership ==
=== Senate ===
PPD PNP PIP

PPD PNP
Office	District	Senator	Party
President	At-large	Eduardo Bhatia	PPD
President pro tempore	At-large	José Luis Dalmau	PPD
Majority Leader	At-large	Aníbal José Torres	PPD
Majority Whip	At-large	Rossana López León	PPD
Minority Leader	At-large	Larry Seilhamer Rodríguez	PNP
Minority Whip	District II - Bayamón	Carmelo Ríos	PNP

=== House of Representatives ===
PPD PNP

Office	District	Representative	Party
Speaker of the House	At-Large	Jaime Perelló	PPD
Speaker Pro Tem	39th District	Roberto Rivera	PPD
Majority Leader	At-large	Charlie Hernández	PPD
Majority Whip	20th District	Carlos Bianchi Angleró	PPD
Minority Leader	At-Large	Jenniffer González	PNP

== Members ==
=== Senate ===
PPD PNP PIP
District	Name	Political party
At-large	Angel Rosa	PPD
At-large	Aníbal José Torres	PPD
At-large	Antonio Fas Alzamora	PPD
At-large	Cirilo Tirado	PPD
At-large	Eduardo Bhatia	PPD
At-large	Rossana López León	PPD
District I San Juan	José Nadal Power	PPD
District I San Juan	Ramón Luis Nieves	PPD
District IV Mayagüez–Aguadilla	Gilberto Rodríguez	PPD
District IV Mayagüez–Aguadilla	María Teresa González	PPD
District V Ponce	Martín Vargas Morales	PPD
District V Ponce	Ramón Ruiz	PPD
District VI Guayama	Ángel M. Rodríguez Otero	PPD
District VI Guayama	Miguel A. Pereira	PPD
District VII Humacao	Jorge Suárez	PPD
District VII Humacao	José Luis Dalmau	PPD
District VIII Carolina	Luis Daniel Rivera	PPD
District VIII Carolina	Pedro A. Rodríguez	PPD
At-large	Itzamar Peña	PNP
At-large	Larry Seilhamer Rodríguez	PNP
At-large	Margarita Nolasco	PNP
At-large	Thomas Rivera Schatz	PNP
District II Bayamón	Carmelo Ríos	PNP
District II Bayamón	Migdalia Padilla	PNP
District III Arecibo	Ángel Martínez	PNP
District III Arecibo	José Joito Pérez	PNP
At-large	Maria de Lourdes Santiago	PIP

=== House ===
PPD PNP
District	Name	Political party
At-large	Brenda López de Arrarás	PPD
At-large	Charlie Hernández	PPD
At-large	Eduardo Ferrer Ríos	PPD
At-large	Jaime Perelló	PPD
At-large	Jorge Colberg Toro	PPD
At-large	Luis Vega Ramos	PPD
District 2	Luis Raúl Torres	PPD
District 3	Sonia Pacheco	PPD
District 4	José Luis Báez	PPD
District 11	Rafael "Tatito" Hernández	PPD
District 15	César Hernández	PPD
District 16	José "Tony" Rodríguez	PPD
District 17	Armando Franco	PPD
District 19	Efraín de Jesús	PPD
District 20	Carlos Bianchi Angleró	PPD
District 21	Lydia Méndez Silva	PPD
District 23	Nelson Torres Yordán	PPD
District 25	Víctor "Cacho" Vassallo	PPD
District 27	José "Pito" Torres	PPD
District 29	Carlos Vargas Ferrer	PPD
District 30	Luis "Narmito" Ortíz	PPD
District 31	Jesús Santa Rodríguez	PPD
District 32	José "Conny" Varela	PPD
District 34	Ramón Luis Cruz	PPD
District 35	Narden Jaime Espinosa	PPD
District 38	Javier Aponte Dalmau	PPD
District 39	Roberto Rivera Ruíz	PPD
District 40	Ángel Matos García	PPD
At-large	Jenniffer González	PNP
At-large	José Aponte Hernández	PNP
At-large	José Enrique Meléndez	PNP
At-large	Lourdes Ramos	PNP
At-large	María Milagros Charbonier	PNP
District 1	José "Nuno" López	PNP
District 5	Jorge Navarro Suárez	PNP
District 6	Antonio "Tony" Soto	PNP
District 7	Luis Pérez Ortíz	PNP
District 8	Antonio "Toñito" Silva	PNP
District 9	Ángel "Gary" Rodríguez	PNP
District 10	Pedro Julio Santiago	PNP
District 12	Héctor Torres Calderón	PNP
District 13	Gabriel Rodríguez Aguiló	PNP
District 14	Ricardo Llerandi	PNP
District 18	Ángel Muñoz	PNP
District 22	Waldemar Quiles Rodríguez	PNP
District 24	Luis "Tato" León	PNP
District 26	Urayoán Hernández	PNP
District 28	Rafael "June" Rivera	PNP
District 33	Ángel Peña	PNP
District 36	Carlos "Johnny" Méndez	PNP
District 37	Ángel Bulerín	PNP

== See also ==
- List of Legislative Assemblies of Puerto Rico
