= 2012 New Progressive Party of Puerto Rico primaries =

New Progressive Party primaries, 2012
- March 18, 2012
Previous PNP Governor candidate
Luis Fortuño
PNP Governor candidate-elect
Luis Fortuño

The 2012 New Progressive Party primaries were the primary elections by which voters of the New Progressive Party (PNP) chose its nominees for various political offices of Puerto Rico for the 2012 general elections. They were held on March 18, 2012 and coincided with the Republican Party primaries in the island.

== Background ==
At the time of the primaries, the New Progressive Party had already chosen current Governor Luis Fortuño, as their gubernatorial candidate for reelection. He would be joined again in the ballot by current Resident Commissioner Pedro Pierluisi. There was the possibility for a primary between Fortuño and aspiring candidate Iván González Cancel, but he wasn't certified by the Commission. González appealed the decision in the courts, but the case was still pending at the time of the primaries.

In the Senate, there were 14 sitting senators looking to retain their election spots. In the House, there were around 6 sitting at-large representatives as well. Also, some returning candidates from previous years, like Carlos Díaz, and other former officeholders, like María Milagros Charbonier and Zoé Laboy, were entering the political race. Current representative Liza M. Fernández was running for a Senate seat this time, while her husband, Angel Pérez, was running for a representative seat in District 6.

Sitting representative Cristóbal Colón Ruíz was also looking to gain an election spot to be mayor of Patillas, against sitting mayor Benjamín Cintrón. There were fifteen sitting mayor from the PNP that were challenged in primaries.

Also, the amount of primaries per municipality and districts were few, when compared to previous years. As a result, the primaries were expected to be of low participation among the party members.

== Candidates ==
=== Senate ===
==== At-large ====
- Lucy Arce
- Héctor Morales
- Margarita Nolasco
- Itzamar Peña
- Kimmey Raschke
- Thomas Rivera Schatz
- Melinda Romero
- Larry Seilhamer

==== District ====
The New Progressive Party held primaries on 5 of the 8 senatorial districts.

===== San Juan =====
- Eddie Charbonier
- Liza M. Fernández
- Zoé Laboy

===== Arecibo =====
- Edgardo "Eggie" Centeno
- José Emilio González Velázquez
- Juan Miguel Guzmán
- Angel Martínez Santiago
- José "Joito" Pérez
- Elaine "Tuti" Soler

===== Mayagüez-Aguadilla =====
- Frank Hernández
- Luis Daniel Muñiz Cortes
- Alfredo Ocasio
- Evelyn Vázquez
- Benjamín "Bengie" Velázquez

===== Guayama =====
- Osvaldo Colón Reyes
- William "Willie" Jiménez
- Miguelito Rodríguez
- Marangely Sáez
- Carlos J. Torres Torres

===== Humacao =====
- Juan Bautista
- José R. Díaz Hernández
- Alexis Quiñones
- Luz M. Santiago González

=== House of Representatives ===
==== At-large ====
- Néstor Alonso
- José Aponte
- José Chico
- Jenniffer González
- Jorge Irizarry
- José E. Meléndez Ortíz
- María Milagros Charbonier
- Yumary Peña
- Lourdes Ramos
- José "Pichy" Torres Zamora

==== District ====
The New Progressive Party held primaries on 18 of the 40 representative districts.

===== District 4 =====
- Carlos Díaz
- Víctor Parés

===== District 6 =====
- Angel Pérez Otero
- Antonio "Tony" Soto

===== District 11 =====
- José "Cano" Montes
- María Vega Pagán

===== District 14 =====
- Ricardo Llerandi
- Paula Rodríguez Homs

===== District 16 =====
- Eric Alfaro Calero
- Armando Nieves

===== District 18 =====
- David Bonilla Cortés
- Angel Muñoz
- Alejandro Torres Babilonia

===== District 19 =====
- Rafael Beauchamp
- Manuel Feliciano
- Orlando "Pochy" Orta
- Juan Alberto Zapata

===== District 21 =====
- Noel Morales, Jr.
- Ramoncito Ramos

===== District 22 =====
- Exel López
- Luis Maldonado
- Waldemar Quiles

===== District 25 =====
- Roberto González Rosa
- Luis Mercado Fraticelli
- Luis Armando Rivera

===== District 26 =====
- Urayoán Hernández
- José Luis Jiménez

===== District 29 =====
- Carlos Junior Aponte
- Adalberto Reyes

===== District 31 =====
- John Corales
- Roberto López

===== District 32 =====
- José R. Camino
- Orlando Rivera
- Rafael Uceta

===== District 34 =====
- Félix "Johnny" Figueroa
- José Iván Medina
- Pickie Díaz

===== District 35 =====
- Ciary Pérez
- Reinaldo Vargas

===== District 38 =====
- Eric Correa
- Israel Matos Vázquez

===== District 40 =====
- Angel Camacho
- Elizabeth Casado

=== Mayors ===
The New Progressive Party held primaries in 24 of 78 municipalities.

==== Aguada ====
- Luis "Berty" Echevarría
- Manuel Santiago

==== Arecibo ====
- Carlos Molina
- Lemuel Soto

==== Cabo Rojo ====
- Perza Rodríguez
- José "Chiquin" Morales

==== Cayey ====
- Wilson Colón
- Omar Vázquez

==== Ceiba ====
- Pedro Colón Osorio
- Angelo Cruz

==== Cidra ====
- Javier Carrasquillo
- Pedro "Banchy" Cintrón

==== Culebra ====
- Emerito Amaro
- Ricardo López

==== Florida ====
- Julio "Kosovo" Carrión
- José Gerena Polanco
- Aarón Pargas

==== Guayanilla ====
- Janice González
- Julissa Nolasco

==== Hormigueros ====
- Augustine "Chito" Olivencia
- José "Joe" Rodríguez

==== Humacao ====
- Julio César López
- Lucrecia Ortíz

==== Isabela ====
- Gabriel Machado
- Juvencio "Papo" Méndez
- José Sotomayor

==== Jayuya ====
- Roberto Pagán Crespí
- Luis Ernesto Torres

==== Loíza ====
- Ferdín Carrasquillo
- Eddie Manso

==== Luquillo ====
- Eva Benabe Torrens
- José "Nelo" González
- David Pizarro Rivera

==== Manatí ====
- Juan Aubín Cruz Manzano
- José Sánchez

==== Naguabo ====
- Noé Marcano
- Maritza Meléndez

==== Patillas ====
- Benjamín Cintrón
- Cristóbal Colón Ruíz

==== Salinas ====
- Basilio "Cholito" Baerga
- Carlos Rodríguez Mateo

==== San Sebastián ====
- Joselly González
- Javier Jiménez

==== Toa Alta ====
- Luis "Jumbo" Collazo
- Luis Visaldén

==== Utuado ====
- Héctor "Tito" Camacho
- Doris Nilda González
- Juan Lamboy
- José "Junior" Pagán
- Jorgito Pérez

==== Vega Baja ====
- José Galán
- Iván Hernández González

== Results ==
=== Senate ===
==== At-large ====
Candidate	Popular vote	Percentage
Thomas Rivera Schatz	234,259	17.22%
Margarita Nolasco	186,660	13.72
Melinda Romero	177,990	13.08
Itzamar Peña	175,593	12.90
Larry Seilhamer	166,729	12.25
Lucy Arce	142,747	10.49
Héctor Morales	135,381	9.95
Kimmey Raschke	130,414	9.58
Others	10,889	0.82

==== District ====
===== San Juan =====
Candidate	Popular vote	Percentage
Zoé Laboy	18,459	39.61%
Liza M. Fernández	16,259	34.78
Eddie Charbonier	11,581	24.83
Others	394	0.78

===== Arecibo =====
Candidate	Popular vote	Percentage
Angel Martínez	21,309	24.50%
José "Joito" Pérez	19,751	22.43
José Emilio González	17,721	19.35
Elaine "Tuti" Soler	12,230	14.03
Edgardo Centeno	7,199	8.60
Juan Miguel Guzmán	6,005	7.18
Others	3,884	3.90

===== Mayagüez-Aguadilla =====
Candidate	Popular vote	Percentage
Luis Daniel Muñiz	25,279	31.63%
Evelyn Vázquez	20,333	25.44%
Benjamín Velázquez	19,912	24.91%
Frank Hernández	6,022	7.53%
Alfredo Ocasio	6,165	7.71%
Others	2,279	2.78%

===== Guayama =====
Candidate	Popular vote	Percentage
Carlos J. Torres	14,794	22.66%
Miguelito Rodríguez	13,776	21.87
Willie Jiménez	13,071	20.78
Osvaldo Colón	13,308	20.27
Mara Sáez	6,931	11.54
Others	1,785	2.89

===== Humacao =====
Candidate	Popular vote	Percentage
Luz M. Santiago	18,032	32.21%
José Ramón Díaz	17,601	31.43
Alex Quiñones	13,097	23.42
Juan Bautista	5,883	10.53
Others	1,474	2.40

=== House of Representatives ===
==== At-large ====
Candidate	Popular vote	Percentage
Jenniffer González	229,930	16.71%
José "Pichy" Torres Zamora	173,978	12.65%
José Aponte	171,611	12.47%
Lourdes Ramos	158.932	11.57%
María Milagros Charbonier	145,890	10.60%
José Kikito Meléndez	142,942	10.42%
José Chico	134,983	9.81%
Nélson Alonso	84,634	6.15%
Yumary Peña	81,726	5.94%
Jorge A. Irizarry	38,401	2.79%
Others	12,760	.93%

== Aftermath ==
=== Allegations of fraud ===
On the same day of the primaries, PPD Electoral Commissioner Eder Ortíz, claimed he had evidence of fraud from the PNP primaries.

=== Sitting senators losing ===
Senators Evelyn Vázquez (District IV) and José Emilio González (District III) had their candidatures at risk. Vázquez win over Benjamín Velázquez was close and could go to a recount, while José Emilio González claimed there were irregularities that could have led to his loss.

=== Representative District 6 ===
There was a lot of controversy surrounding the primaries for the House of Representatives District 6. Both candidates, Angel Pérez and Antonio Soto, have exchanged leads and have been announced as winners after different vote counts. Pérez, who had initially appeared as the loser, claimed there was fraud in the election, and accused Guaynabo mayor, Héctor O'Neill, of orchestrating it. When Pérez was announced as the real winner, O'Neill, who supported Pagán's rival, went into a rant on a radio interview against his own party.

=== Incumbent mayors losses ===
Several sitting mayors from the PNP lost their candidacies for the elections. Some of them were Benjamín Cintrón (from Patillas), Lemuel Soto (Arecibo), and Maritza Meléndez (Naguabo).

== See also ==
- Popular Democratic Party primaries, 2012
