= List of female members of the House of Representatives of Puerto Rico =

The following women have served in the House of Representatives of Puerto Rico:

| # | Portrait | Name | From | Until | Party | District |
|---|---|---|---|---|---|---|
| 1 | | María L. Arcelay de la Rosa | January 2, 1933 | January 2, 1941 | Republican | 16th (Mayaguez) |
| 2 | | María L. Gómez Garriga | January 2, 1941 | January 2, 1957 | Popular Democratic | 10th (Utuado) / At-Large |
| 3 | | Amalia Marín de Muñoz | November 6, 1942 | March 4, 1943 | Popular Democratic | 15th (Mayaguez) |
| 4 | | Milagros González Chapel | January 2, 1953 | January 2, 1969 | Popular Democratic | 20th (Añasco, Aguada, Rincón) |
| 5 | | Carmen Solá de Pereira | January 2, 1957 | January 2, 1969 | Popular Democratic | 26th (Ponce) |
| 6 | | Julia Arce de Franklin | January 2, 1961 | January 2, 1965 | Republican | At-Large |
| 7 | | Blanca E. Colberg de Rodríguez | January 2, 1965 | January 2, 1969 | Popular Democratic | 22nd (Cabo Rojo, Hormigueros, Lajas) |
| 8 | | Josefina Llovet Díaz | January 2, 1965 | October 25, 1967 | Republican | At-Large |
| 9 | | Olga Cruz de Nigaglioni | January 2, 1969 | January 2, 1977 | Popular Democratic | At-Large |
| 10 | | Elba Otero de Jové | February 24, 1970 | January 2, 1973 | New Progressive | At-Large |
| 11 | | Antonia Hidalgo Díaz | January 2, 1973 | January 2, 1977 | New Progressive | 37th (Carolina) |
| 12 | | Celia V. Monrouzeau Martínez | January 2, 1977 | January 2, 1981 | New Progressive | 14th (Arecibo, Hatillo) |
| 13 | | Mabel Vélez de Acevedo | March 5, 1943 | February 24, 1944 | Popular Democratic | 18th (Moca, Aguada, Añasco, Rincón, Mayaguez) |
| 14 | | Zaida R. Hernández Torres | January 2, 1985 | January 2, 1997 | New Progressive | At-Large |
| 15 | | Milagros Couto Octaviani | January 2, 1985 | January 2, 1989 | Popular Democratic | At-Large |
| 16 | | Rosa M. Ramírez Pantojas | January 2, 1989 | January 2, 1993 | New Progressive | 3rd (San Juan) |
| 17 | | Myrna Passalacqua Amadeo | January 2, 1993 | January 1, 1996 | New Progressive | 5th (San Juan) |
| 18 | | Lyssette Díaz Torres | January 2, 1993 | January 2, 2001 | New Progressive | 28th (Morovis, Barranquitas, Corozal, Naranjito) |
| 19 | | Brunilda Soto Echevarría | January 2, 1993 | January 2, 1997 | New Progressive | 40th (Carolina, Trujillo Alto) |
| 20 | | María L. Ramos Rivera | March 26, 1996 - January 2, 2001 / January 2, 2005 | present | New Progressive | At-Large |
| 21 | | Melinda K. Romero Donnelly | January 2, 1997 | January 2, 2005 | New Progressive | 1st (San Juan) / At-Large |
| 22 | | Alba I. Rivera Ramírez | January 2, 1997 | January 2, 2013 | New Progressive | 3rd (San Juan) |
| 23 | | Elisa Juarbe Beníquez | January 2, 1997 | January 2, 2001 | New Progressive | 16th (Isabela, San Sebastián, Las Marías) |
| 24 | | Lydia R. Méndez Silva | January 2, 1997 | present | Popular Democratic | 21st (Guánica, Lajas, Sabana Grande, Yauco, Maricao) |
| 25 | | Magdalena Martínez Irizarry | January 2, 1997 | January 2, 2001 | New Progressive | 40th (Carolina, Trujillo Alto) |
| 26 | | Iris M. Ruiz Class | January 2, 1997 | March 1, 2010 | New Progressive | At-Large |
| 27 | | Gladys Vázquez de Nieves | January 2, 1997 | January 2, 2001 | Popular Democratic | At-Large |
| 28 | | Carmen I. González González | January 2, 2001 | January 2, 2009 | Popular Democratic | 27th (Santa Isabel, Aibonito, Coamo, Barranquitas, Juana Díaz) |
| 29 | | Sylvia Rodríguez de Corujo | January 2, 2001 | January 2, 2013 | Popular Democratic | 31st (Aguas Buenas, Caguas, Gurabo) |
| 30 | | Álida Arizmendi Corales | January 2, 2001 | January 31, 2003 | Popular Democratic | At-Large |
| 31 | | Jenniffer A. González Colón | February 28, 2002 | January 2, 2017 | New Progressive | 4th (San Juan) / At-Large |
| 32 | | Sandra Pacheco Couso | March 1, 2004 | January 2, 2005 | New Progressive | 6th (Guaynabo) |
| 33 | | Liza M. Fernández Rodríguez | January 2, 2005 | May 24, 2012 | New Progressive | 4th (San Juan) |
| 34 | | María M. Vega Pagán | January 2, 2009 | January 2, 2013 | New Progressive | 11th (Dorado, Vega Alta, Vega Baja) |
| 35 | | Paula Rodríguez Homs | January 2, 2009 | December 28, 2012 | New Progressive | 14th (Arecibo, Hatillo) |
| 36 | | Catherine J. Nolasco Ortiz | January 2, 2009 | January 2, 2013 | New Progressive | 23rd (Yauco, Guayanilla, Peñuelas, Ponce) |
| 37 | | Elizabeth Casado Irizarry | January 2, 2009 | December 28, 2012 | New Progressive | 40th (Carolina) |
| 38 | | Brenda López de Arrarás | January 1, 2009 | January 2, 2021 | Popular Democratic | At-Large |
| 39 | | Carmen Y. Cruz Soto | January 2, 2009 | January 2, 2013 | Popular Democratic | At-Large |
| 40 | | Sonia Pacheco Irigoyen | January 2, 2013 | January 2, 2017 | Popular Democratic | 3rd (San Juan) |
| 41 | | María M. Charbonier Laureano | January 2, 2013 | September 15, 2020 | New Progressive | At-Large |
| 42 | | Yashira Lebrón Rodríguez | October 23, 2014 | present | New Progressive | 8th (Bayamón) |
| 43 | | Maricarmen Mas Rodríguez | January 2, 2017 | January 2, 2021 | New Progressive | 19th (Mayaguez) |
| 44 | | Jacqueline Rodríguez Hernández | January 2, 2017 | January 2, 2021 | New Progressive | 25th (Jayuya, Ponce, Juana Díaz) |
| 45 | | Deborah Soto Arroyo | January 2, 2021 | January 2, 2025 | Popular Democratic | 10th (Toa Baja) |
| 46 | | Jocelyne Rodríguez Negrón | January 2, 2021 | January 2, 2025 | Popular Democratic | 19th (Mayagüez, San Germán) |
| 47 | | Estrella Martínez Soto | January 2, 2021 | present | Popular Democratic | 27th (Juana Díaz, Santa Isabel, Aibonito, Coamo) |
| 48 | | Gretchen Hau | May 16, 2023 | present | Popular Democratic | 29th (Cayey, Cidra) |
| 49 | | Sol Y. Higgins Cuadrado | January 2, 2021 | present | Popular Democratic | 35th (Humacao, Naguabo, Las Piedras) |
| 50 | | Wanda del Valle | January 2, 2021 | present | New Progressive | 38th (Canóvanas, Carolina, Trujillo Alto) |
