= Endorsements in the 2016 Democratic Party presidential primaries =

This is a list of endorsements for declared candidates for the Democratic primaries for the 2016 United States presidential election.

== Rocky De La Fuente (withdrawn) ==
List of Rocky De La Fuente endorsements

Activists

- Deez Nuts
- Brian Moore

== Martin O'Malley (withdrawn) ==
List of Martin O'Malley endorsements

Organizations

- Australian Young Labor, NSW Chapter

U.S. Congress

- Gary Hart, Senator from Colorado (1975–1987)
- Joseph Tydings, Senator from Maryland (1965–1971)
- Eric Swalwell, Representative from California's 15th congressional district (2013–present)
- Michael D. Barnes, Representative from Maryland's 8th congressional district (1979–1987)
- Berkley Bedell, Representative from Iowa's 6th congressional district (1975–1987)
- John Wiley Bryant, Representative from Texas's 5th congressional district (1983–1997)
- John Joseph Cavanaugh III, Representative from Nebraska's 2nd congressional district (1977–1981)

U.S. state officials

- Jim Folsom Jr., 50th Governor of Alabama (1993–1995)
- Parris Glendening, 59th Governor of Maryland (1995–2003)
- Harry Hughes, 57th Governor of Maryland (1979–1987)
- Brian Schweitzer, 23rd Governor of Montana (2005–2013)
- Eliot Spitzer, 54th Governor of New York (2007–2008)
- Brian Frosh, 46th Attorney General of Maryland (2015–2023)
- Chris Gorman, 46th Attorney General of Kentucky (1992–1996)
- Daniel Hynes, 6th Illinois Comptroller (1999–2011)
- Jonathan Miller, 39th Kentucky State Treasurer (2000–2008)

U.S. municipal officials

- Chris Abele, 6th Executive of Milwaukee County (2011–present)
- Rushern Baker, 7th Prince George's County, Maryland Executive (2010–2018)
- Joseph Curtatone, 35th Mayor of Somerville, Massachusetts (2004–present)
- Kevin B. Kamenetz, 12th Baltimore County Executive (2010–2018)
- Isiah Leggett, 6th Montgomery County, Maryland Executive (2006–2018)
- Manny Diaz, 31st Mayor of Miami (2001–2009)
- C. Jack Ellis, 40th Mayor of Macon, Georgia (1999–2007)
- Mike Fahey, 49th Mayor of Omaha (2001–2009)
- Oscar Goodman, 21st Mayor of Las Vegas (1999–2011)
- Thomas J. Murphy Jr., 57th Mayor of Pittsburgh (1994–2006)
- Kurt Schmoke, 46th Mayor of Baltimore (1987–1999)
- Robert W. Curran, Baltimore city councilor(1995–2016)
- Tom Hucker, Montgomery County, Maryland councilor (2014–present)
- Matt O'Malley, Boston city councilor (2010–present)
- Bill Green, Philadelphia city councilor (2008–2014)

State legislators

- Rich Taylor, Iowa state senator
- Nelson Torres Yordán, Maryland state delegate (2013–2016)
- Charles Townsend, New Hampshire state representative
- Ronald N. Young, Maryland state senator (2011–present)
- Boyd Brown, South Carolina state representative (2008–2012)
- Peter Burling, New Hampshire state senator (2004–2008)
- Betsy Burtis, New Hampshire state representative
- Ginger Crocker, South Carolina state representative (1978–1984)
- Gerard F. Doherty, Massachusetts state representative (1957–1965)
- Ann Marie Doory, Maryland state delegate (1987–2010)
- Steve Lathrop, Nebraska state legislator (2007–2015)
- Maureen Mann, New Hampshire state representative (2008–2010)
- Charlotte Pritt, West Virginia state delegate (1980–1984), West Virginia state senator (1984–1996), Democratic nominee for Governor (1996)
- Andrew Martin, Nevada state assemblyman (2013–2015)
- Catherine Mulholland, New Hampshire state representative
- David Schapira, Arizona state senator (2011–2013)
- Paul Weissmann, Colorado Senate (2003–2011)
- Peter Murphy, Maryland state delegate (2007–2014)
- Carlos Bianchi Angleró, Puerto Rico state representative
- Bruce Bearinger, Iowa state representative
- Tod Bowman, Iowa state senator (2011–2019)
- Talmadge Branch, Maryland state delegate (1995–present)
- Benjamin Brooks, Maryland state delegate
- Ramón Luis Cruz, Puerto Rico state representative (2013–present)
- William Cunningham, Illinois state senator (2013–present)
- Michael Driscoll, Pennsylvania state representative
- Kathleen M. Dumais, Maryland state delegate (2003–present)
- Bill Ferguson, Maryland state senator (2011–present)
- Craig Ford, Alabama state representative (2001–present)
- William Frick, Maryland state delegate (2007–2019)
- Barbara A. Frush, Maryland state delegate (1995–2019)
- Tawanna P. Gaines, Maryland state delegate (2001–2019)
- Anne Healey, Maryland state delegate (1991–present)
- Frank Heffron, New Hampshire state representative
- César Hernández Alfonzo, Puerto Rico state representative (2013–2017)
- Patricia Higgins, New Hampshire state representative
- Bruce Hunter, Iowa state representative (2003–present)
- Dan Kelley, Iowa state representative (2011–2017)
- Kevin Kinney, Iowa state senator
- Karen Lewis Young, Maryland state delegate
- Mary Ann Lisanti, Maryland state delegate (2015–present)
- John Mann, New Hampshire state representative
- Charlie McConkey, Iowa state representative
- Nathaniel McFadden, Maryland state senator (1995–present)
- Jorge Suárez Cáceres, Puerto Rico state senator (2008–2013)
- Karen S. Montgomery, Maryland state senator (2011–2016)
- Sonia Pacheco, Puerto Rico state representative (2013–2017)
- Andrew Platt, Maryland state delegate
- Vincent Sheheen, South Carolina state senator) (2004–present)

Notable individuals

- Yvette Lewis, Maryland DNC member
- Terry Lierman, former MD Dem. Party Chair
- LuAnn Pedrick, Iowa DNC member
- Dropkick Murphys, punk band
- Timothy Simons, actor
- Phil Noble, entrepreneur
- Ted Sarandos, Netflix executive
- Lyndon LaRouche, political activist and founder of the LaRouche movement

== Lawrence Lessig (withdrawn) ==
List of Lawrence Lessig endorsements

Note: Lessig suspended his campaign on November 2, 2015

Internet, radio and television personalities

- Dylan Ratigan, former host of MSNBC's The Dylan Ratigan Show

Individuals

- J. J. Abrams, director
- David Brin, scientist and writer
- Ophelia Dahl, co-founder of Partners In Health
- Michael Eisen, biologist and co-founder of Public Library of Science (PLOS)
- Joi Ito, Director of the MIT Media Lab
- Brewster Kahle, founder of the Internet Archive
- Miguel de Icaza, founder of GNOME and Mono (software)
- James Kwak, professor and blogger
- Quinn Norton, journalist and photographer
- Jimmy Wales, internet entrepreneur, Wikipedia founder
- Ethan Zuckerman, internet activist and director of the MIT Center for Civic Media

Leaders in Business

- Arnold Hiatt, former president of the Stride Rite footwear company
- Matt Mullenweg, developer of WordPress
- Ev Williams, co-founder of Twitter

Celebrities

- Bryan Callen, actor and comedian
- Shepard Fairey, street artist and activist
- Matt Korklan, professional wrestler
- Krist Novoselic, Nirvana bassist and co-founder, FairVote board chair

== Jim Webb (withdrawn) ==
List of Jim Webb endorsements

Individuals

- Andrew Bacevich, political scientist
- Craig Crawford, writer and television political commentator
- David Saunders, political strategist and author
- Michael Savage, Conservative radio talk show host
