= José Luis Báez =

Puerto Rican politician

Member of the Puerto Rico House of Representatives from the 4th District
- In office January 2, 2013 – January 2, 2016
- Preceded by: Liza Fernández Rodríguez
- Succeeded by: Víctor Parés

Personal details
- Born: Mayagüez, Puerto Rico
- Party: Popular Democratic Party (PPD)
- Education: University of Puerto Rico (BA); Interamerican University of Puerto Rico School of Law (JD)

José Luis Báez is a Puerto Rican politician born in Mayagüez, PR and resident of San Juan, PR affiliated with the Popular Democratic Party (PPD). He was elected to the Puerto Rico House of Representatives on 2012 to represent District 4. Jose Luis Báez is the son of former senator Eudaldo Báez Galib.

== Education ==
Earned a Bachelor of Arts from the University of Puerto Rico and a Juris Doctor from the Interamerican University of Puerto Rico School of Law.

== Political career ==
In December 2015, Báez announced that he would not run for an elective position in the 2016 general elections. He attributed his retirement from active politics to the discontent with how the members of his party, the Popular Democratic Party (PPD), were handling differences between them.
