= Samuel Pagán =

Puerto Rican politician

Samuel Págan

Member of the Puerto Rico House of Representatives from the 35th District
- In office January 2, 2017 – May 29, 2018
- Preceded by: Narden Jaime Espinosa
- Succeeded by: Reinado Vargas

Personal details
- Born: May 17, 1978 (age 48) Humacao, Puerto Rico
- Party: New Progressive Party (PNP)
- Education: University of Puerto Rico at Humacao (AS); University of Turabo (B.Ed.)

Samuel Pagán Cuadrado (born May 17, 1977) is a Puerto Rican politician affiliated with the New Progressive Party (PNP). He has been a member of the Puerto Rico House of Representatives since 2017 representing the 35th District.

== Early years and studies ==
Born in 1977 in Humacao, Puerto Rico to Samuel Pagán Quintana and Ana Cuadrado. He obtained an associate degree in communications from the University of Puerto Rico at Humacao and a B.Ed. in elementary education from the University of Turabo graduating Magna-laude.

== Professional career ==
He started his career as a real estate broker in 1997. A few years later decided to exercise his vocation as a teacher at Manuel Mediavilla Negrón vocational school in his native Humacao.

== Political career ==
After winning a district primaries, he was nominated as a candidate for the Puerto Rico House of Representatives for the 35th District. On May 29, 2018, Samuel Pagán announced his resignation from the Puerto Rico House of Representatives.

== Personal life ==
He is married to Nancy Malavé Toro and has two children.
