= Albita Rivera Ramírez =

Puerto Rican politician

Alba I. Rivera Ramírez
- Cámara de Representantes de Puerto Rico

Member of the Puerto Rico House of Representatives from the 3rd district
- In office January 2, 1997 – January 1, 2013
- Preceded by: Leo Díaz Urbina
- Succeeded by: Sonia Pacheco

Member of the Puerto Rico Senate from the At-Large district
- In office January 2, 1985 - January 2, 1989

Personal details
- Born: December 22 Vega Baja, Puerto Rico
- Party: New Progressive Party
- Other political affiliations: Republican
- Education: University of Puerto Rico (BA)
- Profession: Teacher

Alba Iris "Cacatúa" Rivera Ramirez is a Puerto Rican politician affiliated to the New Progressive Party (PNP). Rivera served as a member of the House of Representatives of Puerto Rico representing District 3 of San Juan from 1997 to 2013. She was also a member of the Senate of Puerto Rico (1985–1989) and Director of the Puerto Rican Office of Woman's Affairs.

Today she is the only woman in Puerto Rican history to be elected from the same Representative District as her mother, former representative Rosa M. Ramírez Pantojas, who served from 1989 to 1993. She is also the only woman to have served in both legislative chambers, as well as the Executive Branch.

== Early years and studies ==
Albita Rivera Ramírez was born December 22. She completed her elementary and high school studies at Colegio La Milagrosa in Río Piedras.

In 1970, Rivera completed her bachelor's degree in arts from the University of Puerto Rico. After graduating, Rivera worked as a schoolteacher.

== Professional career ==
After graduating from college, Rivera worked as a schoolteacher for five years.

== Public service ==
During Carlos Romero Barceló's tenure as Mayor of San Juan, Rivera was appointed as Executive Director of the Center of Multiple Services of La Perla in San Juan. A year later, she worked as Service Coordinator for the Head Start Program in the capital. In 1976, Rivera was put in charge of the Office of Citizen Service of the Department of Housing.

== Political career ==
Rivera's political career began in 1984, when she was elected to the Senate of Puerto Rico. During her first term, she was a member of thirteen commissions, and served as her party speaker in some of them (Education, Social and Cultural Development, Health and Environmental Quality).

In 1992, Rivera served as executive director of the Puerto Rican Office of Woman's Affairs, under Pedro Rossello's tenure as governor.

Rivera decided to run for the House of Representatives of Puerto Rico in the 1996 general election. She won a seat representing District 3, and was sworn in on January 2, 1997. During that term, she presided the Commissions of Government Corruption, and served as vice president of the Commissions of Education and Culture, and Woman's Affair.

Rivera was reelected in 2000, 2004, and 2008. During her last term, she also served as president of the Women's Caucus of the Legislative Assembly.

During the campaign for the 2012 general elections, she was paired with Liza Fernández to speak on behalf of Jorge Santini. The duo was heavily featured in El Vocero, becoming known as "Minga y Petraca", in reference to a folkloric pair of fictional characters. However, both Rivera and Fernández failed to retain their seats, while Santini also lost to Carmen Yulín Cruz. After four consecutive terms, Rivera was defeated by Sonia Pacheco, from the Popular Democratic Party (PPD), at the 2012 general election.
