= Roberto López Román =

Puerto Rico politician

Member of the Puerto Rico House of Representatives from the 31st District
- Incumbent
- Assumed office October 7, 2025
- Preceded by: Vimarie Peña Davila

Personal details
- Born: March 20, 1978 (age 48) Caguas, Puerto Rico
- Party: New Progressive Party
- Education: Florida International University (BA)

Roberto J. López Román is a Puerto Rican politician. He was elected a member of the House of Representatives of Puerto Rico in a 2025 special election.

== Early life and education ==
Roberto J. López Román was born on March 20, 1978 in Caguas, Puerto Rico. Graduated from high school at Colegio Católico Notre Dame in Caguas. Completed his undergraduate and graduate studies at Florida International University (FIU) with a concentration in Political Science. Currently, Roberto is in the dissertation process for his doctoral degree (Ph.D) in History.

== Political career ==
He was previously president of the Caguas municipal committee. In 2016,2020 and 2024, he was a mayoral candidate.
