= Angel Pérez Otero =

Puerto Rican politician (born 1970)

Ángel Pérez Otero
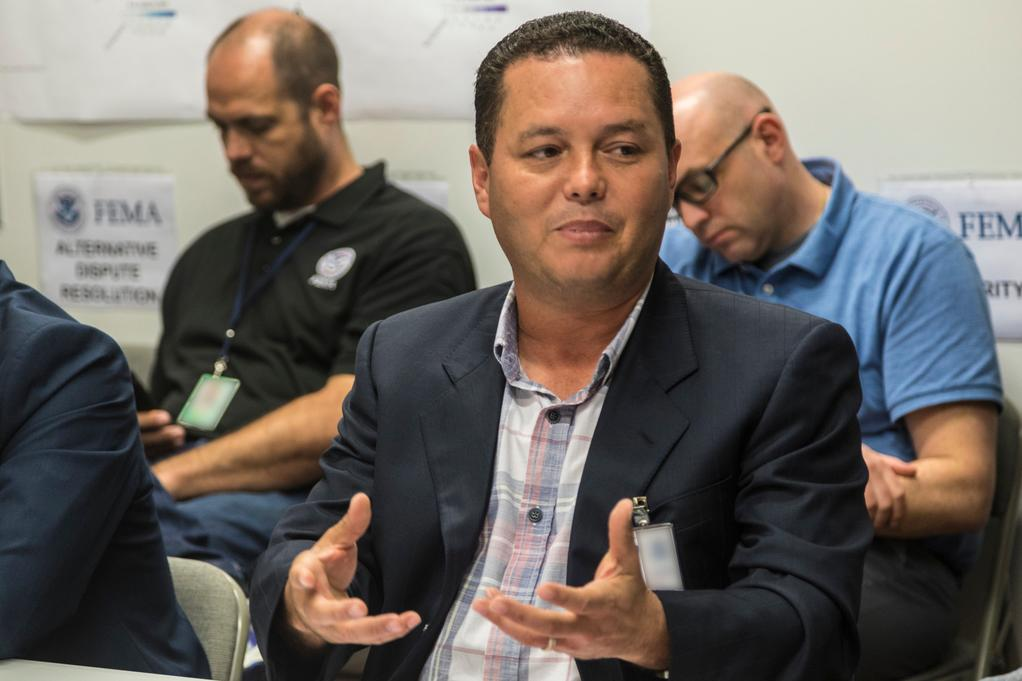
- Pérez in March, 2018

Mayor of Guaynabo, Puerto Rico
- In office August 18, 2017 – December 9, 2021
- Preceded by: Hector O'Neill
- Succeeded by: Edward O'Neill Rosa

Personal details
- Born: September 18, 1970 (age 56) Rio Piedras, Puerto Rico
- Party: New Progressive Party (PNP)
- Spouse: Liza Fernández (2006-present)
- Children: Angel Gabriel; Valeria Angélica (b. 2007); Lorena Angeliz (b. 2008)
- Education: Metropolitan University (BBM)

Ángel Pérez Otero (born September 18, 1970) is a Puerto Rican politician, and former mayor of Guaynabo, Puerto Rico. He was a member of the Puerto Rico House of Representatives from 2005 to 2012.

Pérez was first elected to the House of Representatives in the 2004 general election. He represented District 6. He was reelected at the 2008 general election.

In a special election to replace Hector O'Neill in 2017, he was elected mayor of Guaynabo.

Pérez is married to former fellow Representative and Senator Liza Fernández Rodríguez, who was appointed by Governor Luis Fortuño in 2012 as a Superior Court Judge.

== Early years and studies ==
Angel Pérez Otero was born September 18, 1970, in Río Piedras. He is the oldest of five siblings. Pérez completed his elementary and high school studies in Guaynabo, graduating from Margarita Janer High School.

In 1992, Pérez completed a Bachelor's degree in Business Management, with a major in Accounting, from the Metropolitan University. He graduated magna cum laude. He began his public-service career in 1991 in the Human Resources Office of the Municipality of Guaynabo, later working for the Office of the Comptroller of Puerto Rico before returning to the municipality.

== Public service ==
Pérez began working at the Office of Human Resources of Guaynabo in 1991. Two years later, he started working at the Office of the Comptroller of Puerto Rico, until 1995. That year, he returned to work at the Budget Office of Guaynabo.

== Political career ==
Pérez began his political career as President of the NPP Youth, and then as Vicepresident of the party in Guaynabo.

In January 2004, Pérez was elected to the House of Representatives of Puerto Rico representing District 6, replacing the former Mayor of Cataño, Wilson Soto.

That same year, Pérez was elected in the general election. During that term, he presided over the Commissions of Budget and Assignments, and was co-president of the Commission of Legislative Donations, among others.

Pérez was reelected in 2008, and was chosen as Majority Whip for his party in the House of Representatives.

Pérez won the Special Election for mayor of Guaynabo on August 5, 2017, by a large margin (69.96% to 30.04%) against Senate Majority Leader Carmelo Ríos (NPP).

== Public scandals ==
Pérez was involved in a scandal, during the 2012 PNP primaries, when it was revealed that there were some irregularities in the voting process at his District. Some of the irregularities involved Mayor of Guaynabo, Héctor O'Neill, forcing members of the municipal police to vote for Pérez' rival, Antonio Soto. In the end, Pérez' rival prevailed, preventing him from running at the upcoming elections.

On December 9, 2021, Pérez was arrested by the Federal Bureau of Investigation (FBI) on corruption charges, and relieved of his duties as mayor of Guaynabo by the Puerto Rico Office of the Special Independent Prosecutor's Panel.

In 2023 he was convicted of corruption following his participation in a scheme involving the awarding of contracts and expediting invoice payments in exchange for thousands of dollars in cash from late 2019 to May 2021. In February 2024, he was sentenced to five years' imprisonment.

== Personal life ==
Pérez married fellow Representative and Senator Liza Fernández Rodríguez in 2006. They have two daughters together: Valeria Angélica (b. 2007) and Lorena Angeliz (b. 2008). Pérez has a son, Angel Gabriel, a member of the United States Armed Forces, from a previous marriage.

House of Representatives of Puerto Rico
Preceded by Wilson Soto	Member of the Puerto Rico House of Representatives from the 6th District; 2004-2017	Succeeded by Antonio "Tony" Soto
Political offices
Preceded by Héctor O'Neill	Mayor of Guaynabo, Puerto Rico; 2017-2021	Succeeded by Edward O'Neill Rosa
