= Efraín de Jesús =

Puerto Rican politician

Member of the Puerto Rico House of Representatives from the 19th District
- In office January 2, 2013 – January 1, 2017
- Preceded by: Charlie Hernández
- Succeeded by: Maricarmen Mas Rodríguez

Member of the Puerto Rico Senate for the Mayagüez District
- In office September 2016 – January 2, 2017

Personal details
- Party: Popular Democratic Party (PPD)
- Education: University of Puerto Rico
- Profession: Lawyer

Efraín de Jesús Rodríguez is a Puerto Rican politician affiliated with the Popular Democratic Party (PPD). He was elected to the Puerto Rico House of Representatives in 2012 to represent District 19. In September 2016 he became a Senator to fill a vacancy after the resignation of María Teresa González in the Mayagüez District. De Jesús worked as a commissioner for the Mayagüez Municipal Police and as Director of contracts of the same municipality. At the island level, he chaired the Association of Municipal Commissioners. Before being elected, he served as Director of legal affairs for the Municipality of Mayagüez, a position he held for the last seven years. He has a Juris Doctor degree he has a master's and doctoral studies in literature and Hispanic studies. He served as Superior Judge from 2017 till 2021.
