= Paula Rodríguez Homs =

Puerto Rican politician

Member of the Puerto Rico House of Representatives from the 14th District
- In office January 2, 2009 – January 1, 2013
- Preceded by: Carlos Molina
- Succeeded by: Ricardo Llerandi

Personal details
- Born: April 8, 1968 (age 58) Arecibo, Puerto Rico
- Party: New Progressive Party (PNP)
- Spouse: Norberto Nieves
- Children: 1
- Education: University of Puerto Rico at Arecibo (B.Ed.)

Paula Rodríguez Homs (born April 8, 1968) is a Puerto Rican politician affiliated with the New Progressive Party (PNP). She was a member of the Puerto Rico House of Representatives from 2009 to 2013 representing District 14. She is currently a member of the Board of Directors of the Commission of Public Service.

== Early years and studies ==
Paula A. Rodríguez Homs was born in Arecibo on April 8, 1968. She began her studies at the Cayetano Coll y Toste School, and finished high school at the Los Llanos School. She graduated in 1985, and presided the Graduate Class.

Rodríguez received a Bachelor's degree in Education from the University of Puerto Rico at Arecibo. She later completed a Master's degree in Hispanic Studies.

== Professional career ==
Rodríguez worked as a teacher at the Diego Bravo and Ramón E. Betances schools for 12 years.

== Political career ==
Rodríguez began her political career as a voting college employee for the New Progressive Party (PNP). She was also Regional Director and Secretary of the PNP Youth in Arecibo.

Rodríguez was first elected to the House of Representatives of Puerto Rico at the 2008 general election. During that term, she presided the Commission of Internal Affairs, and was also Vicepresident of the Commission of Education, among others.

Rodríguez presented her candidacy for reelection, but was defeated by Ricardo Llerandi at the 2012 PNP primaries.

On December 20, 2012, Rodríguez was confirmed as member of the Board of Directors of the Commission of Public Service.

== Personal life ==
Rodríguez is married to former Representative Norberto Nieves. They have one child. Nieves was convicted in 2001 of embezzlement and document forging, among others.
