= Armando Franco =

Puerto Rican politician

Member of the Puerto Rico House of Representatives from the 17th District
- In office January 2, 2013 – January 2, 2017
- Preceded by: José Luis Rivera Guerra
- Succeeded by: José Luis Rivera Guerra

Personal details
- Born: October 30, 1964 (age 61) Aguadilla, Puerto Rico
- Party: Popular Democratic Party (PPD)

Armando Franco González (born October 30, 1964) is a Puerto Rican politician affiliated with the Popular Democratic Party (PPD). He was elected to the Puerto Rico House of Representatives in 2012 to represent District 17.
