= Elba Otero de Jové =

Puerto Rican politician

Mayor of Arecibo
- In office 1969–1970
- Preceded by: Darío Goitía
- Succeeded by: Pablo E. Méndez Cabrero

Member of the House of Representatives of Puerto Rico from the At-large district
- In office 1970–1972

Personal details
- Born: February 20, 1918 Arecibo, Puerto Rico
- Died: July 17, 1995 (aged 77)
- Party: New Progressive
- Other political affiliations: Republican
- Education: University of Puerto Rico (BA); New York University (MA)

Elba Otero de Jové was a Puerto Rican female politician from the New Progressive Party (PNP) who served as mayor of Arecibo, Puerto Rico and an at-large member of the House of Representatives of Puerto Rico.

== Education ==
She earned a Bachelor of Arts from the University of Puerto Rico and a Master of Art from New York University.

== Politics ==
She was elected as mayor of Arecibo at the 1968 general elections. in 1970 after the death of her brother Rubén Otero Bosco who was the Speaker Pro Tempore of the House of Representatives of Puerto Rico the New Progressive Party nominated her to fill the vacancy of an At-large position. She was affiliated to the Republican Party and was a member of the National Federation of Republican Women.
