= Juan Aubín Cruz Manzano =

Puerto Rican politician (born 1948)

Mayor of Manatí
- In office January 2, 1977 – January 2, 2017
- Preceded by: José Sánchez González

Personal details
- Born: July 11, 1948 (age 78) Manatí, Puerto Rico
- Party: New Progressive Party (PNP)
- Education: University of Puerto Rico (BA, MA); Interamerican University of Puerto Rico School of Law (JD)
- Occupation: Politician

Juan Aubín "Bín" Cruz Manzano (born June 11, 1948) is a Puerto Rican politician and former mayor of Manatí. He served as mayor for 40 years, making the longest tenured mayors in Puerto Rico.

== Biography ==
Juan Aubín Cruz Manzano was born on June 11, 1948, to Juan Cruz Morales and Teresa Manzano. He completed his early education in the island's public system, graduating from the Fernando Callejo High School in Manatí. After that, he completed both his Bachelor's and Master's degree in Political Science from the University of Puerto Rico. He eventually completed his Juris Doctor in Law from the Interamerican University of Puerto Rico School of Law.

In 1967, he organized the students of the District of Arecibo forming the organization known as Pro-Statehood Student Youth. He also presided the movement of Acción Progresista at the University.

Cruz Manzano was elected as mayor of Manatí at the 1976 general elections. After that, he has been reelected eight times.

Cruz Manzano has received several recognitions. In 1981 the Junior Chamber of Commerce recognized him as Most Distinguished Youth. He also won an Agüeybana de Oro in 1986-1987 for his support of the arts. In 1992, he received a Paoli Award for the presentation of the show El Festival Playero. For the 2016 election, he chose to step down. He was succeeded by José Sánchez González, a member of his own party.
