= Víctor Parés =

Puerto Rican politician (born 1966)

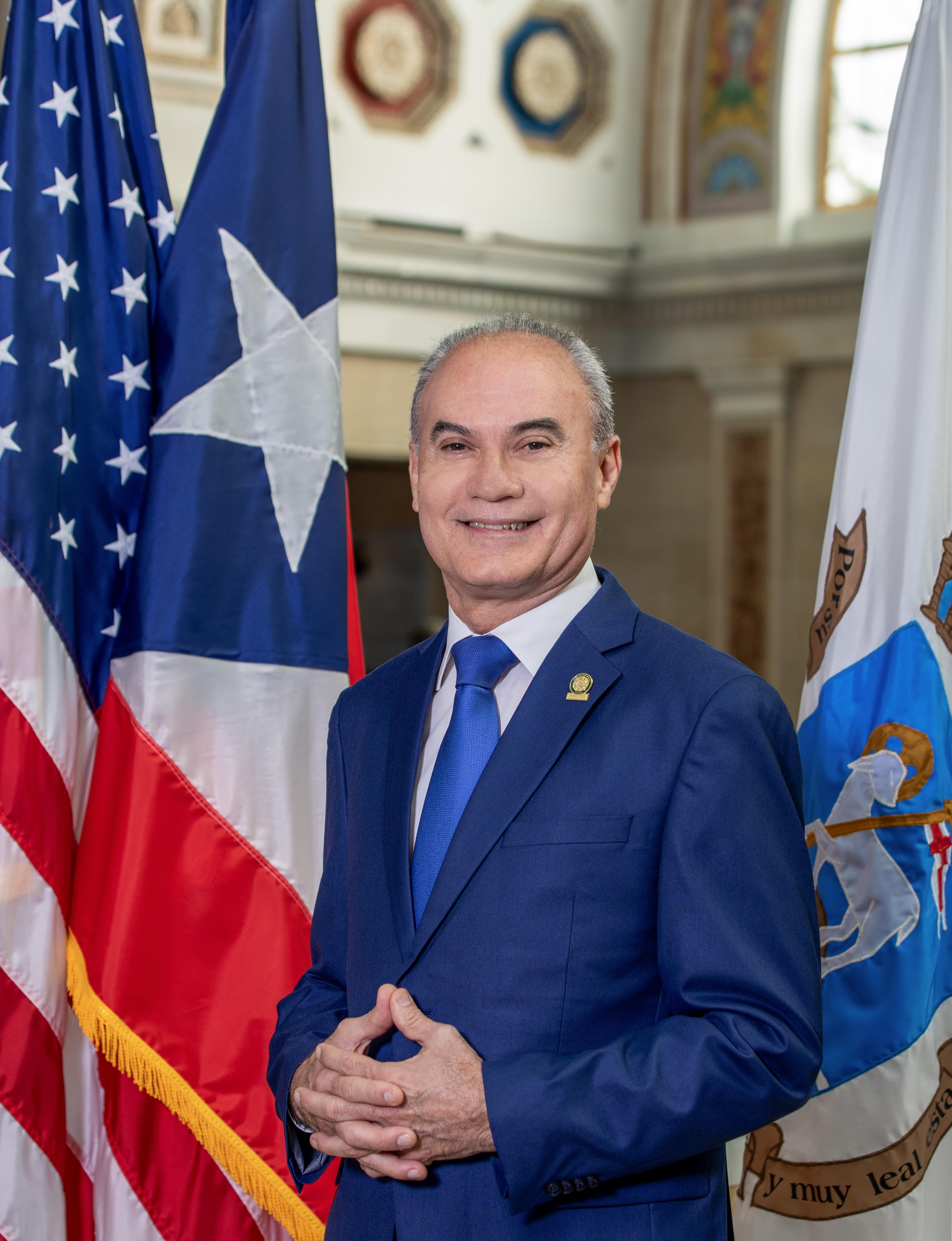

Member of the Puerto Rico House of Representatives from the 4th District
- In office May 24, 2012 – January 1, 2013
- Preceded by: Liza Fernández
- Succeeded by: José Luis Báez
- In office January 1, 2017 – Present
- Preceded by: José Luis Báez

Member of the Municipal Assembly of San Juan, Puerto Rico
- In office 1993-1996

Personal details
- Born: July 18, 1966 (age 60) San Juan, Puerto Rico
- Party: New Progressive Party (PNP)
- Children: 2
- Education: Interamerican University of Puerto Rico (BA)

Víctor Luis Parés Otero (born July 18, 1966) is a Puerto Rican politician affiliated with the New Progressive Party (NPP). He replaced Liza Fernández as a member of the Puerto Rico House of Representatives from 2012 to 2013 representing District 4.

== Early years and studies ==
Víctor Parés was born in San Juan on July 18 to José Parés and Aida Otero. He was president of the Graduate Class of the Central High School in Santurce. Paréz completed a Bachelor in Political Science from the Interamerican University of Puerto Rico. In May 2012, he entered the Puerto Rico House of Representatives as the representative for District 4, filling the seat previously held by Liza Fernández.

== Political career ==
Parés began his political career in 1983, when he was elected President of the PNP Youth of Precinct 4. Eventually, he became Municipal President of the PNP Youth in San Juan.

In 1992, Parés became part of the team of then-candidate to San Juan City Hall, Carlos Díaz Olivo. Parés was also one of Díaz' candidates to the Municipal Assembly of San Juan. Although Díaz Olivo wasn't elected, Parés became part of the Municipal Assembly after the 1992 general election. In 1993, he was appointed vice president of the body.

In 2002, he participated in a primary to fill a vacancy in the House of Representatives of Puerto Rico, representing District 4. However, he wasn't elected. Still, Parés became part of the team of then-candidate Liza Fernández, serving as her Campaign Director. After being elected, Fernández appointed Parés as Executive Director of her office, which he served until 2012.

For the 2008 general election, Mayor of San Juan Jorge Santini asked Parés to be part of his team of Municipal Legislators. With Santini's victory, Parés became a member of the Municipal Assembly of San Juan again.

When Liza Fernández decided in 2011 to resign to her seat in the House to fill a vacancy in the Senate of Puerto Rico, Parés presented his candidacy for the seat. He was elected in the 2012 primaries. After being sworn in on May 24, 2012, Parés became vice president of the Commission of Internal Affairs, as well as secretary of the Commission of Integrated Development of the Capital City, among others.

Parés decided to run for the seat at the 2012 general election, but was unsuccessful.
