= José Torres Ramírez =

Puerto Rican politician

José "Pito" Torres

Member of the Puerto Rico House of Representatives from the 27th District
- In office January 2, 2008 – January 2, 2017
- Preceded by: Carmen Iris González

Personal details
- Born: July 27, 1962 (age 63) Coamo, Puerto Rico
- Party: Popular Democratic Party (PPD)
- Children: 3

José "Pito" Torres Ramírez is a Puerto Rican politician affiliated with the Popular Democratic Party (PPD). He has been a member of the Puerto Rico House of Representatives since 2009 representing District 27.

== Early years and studies ==
José Torres Ramírez was born in Coamo, Puerto Rico on July 27, 1962. He studied at the Colegio Nuestra Señora de Valvanera, and then at the island's public school system.

Torres Ramírez graduated from the school of Mortuary Sciences of Mayagüez, and is a member of the College of Health Professionals. He also studied at the Pontifical Catholic University of Puerto Rico and is certified in handling fraud.

== Professional career ==
Torres Ramírez worked as a retailer. He was president of the Retailers Association of Coamo and president of the Employers Board of the South, and president of the Board of Directors of the San Blas Savings and Credit Cooperative. He also served as vice president of the Board of the Puerto Rico Multiple Insurances Cooperative.

== Political career ==
Torres Ramírez was first elected to the House of Representatives of Puerto Rico at the 2008 general election, to represent District 27. During his first term, he was a member of the Commission of Treasury, Internal Affairs, Housing, Consumer Affairs, Education, and others.

He was reelected for a second term in 2012.
