= María Vega Pagán =

Puerto Rican politician

Mayor of Vega Alta
- Incumbent
- Assumed office January 2, 2021
- Preceded by: Oscar Santiago Martínez

Member of the House of Representatives of Puerto Rico from the 11th district
- In office January 2, 2009 – January 2, 2013
- Preceded by: Javier García Cabán
- Succeeded by: Rafael Hernández Montañez

Personal details
- Born: October 9, 1977 (age 49) Bayamón, Puerto Rico
- Party: New Progressive Party (PNP)
- Children: 3
- Relatives: José R. Ramírez-Garofalo
- Education: University of Puerto Rico at Río Piedras (BA)

María Vega Pagán (born October 9, 1977) is a Puerto Rican politician affiliated with the New Progressive Party (PNP). She was a member of the Puerto Rico House of Representatives from 2009 to 2013 representing District 11. She is the current mayor of Vega Alta.

== Early years and studies ==
María Vega Pagán was born in Bayamón on October 6, 1977. She was raised in the Barrio Bajura Vega Alta.

Vega completed a Bachelor's degree in Political Science from the University of Puerto Rico at Río Piedras.

She studied the Master in Administration from Universidad Metropolitana.

== Professional career ==
Vega worked as a Social and Family Assistance technician for the Department of Family Affairs of Puerto Rico from 1999 to 2008.

== Political career ==
Vega began her political career in 2008, when she ran for the House of Representatives of Puerto Rico to represent District 11. She was elected at the 2008 general election becoming the first female to win in that district. During her first term, she presided the Commission of Integrated Development of the North Region.

Vega wasn't reelected in 2012.

House of Representatives of Puerto Rico
Preceded by Javier García Cabán	Member of the Puerto Rico House of Representatives from the 11th District; 2009-2013	Succeeded by Rafael Hernández Montañez
Political offices
Preceded by Oscar Santiago Martínez	Mayor of Vega Alta, Puerto Rico; 2021-Present	Incumbent
