= César Hernández Alfonzo =

Puerto Rican politician

Member of the Puerto Rico House of Representatives from the 15th District
- In office January 2, 2013 – January 2, 2017
- Preceded by: Arnaldo Jiménez Valle
- Succeeded by: Joel I. Franqui Atiles

Personal details
- Born: July 27, 1977 (age 49) Hatillo, Puerto Rico
- Party: Popular Democratic Party (PPD)
- Education: University of Puerto Rico at Río Piedras

César Hernández Alfonzo (born July 27, 1977) is a Puerto Rican politician affiliated with the Popular Democratic Party (PPD). He was elected to the Puerto Rico House of Representatives in 2012 to represent District 15. In 2020 César Hernández Alfonzo was named superintendent of the Capitol of Puerto Rico.
