= Charlie Hernández =

Puerto Rican politician

Majority leader of the Puerto Rico House of Representatives
- In office January 2, 2013 – January 2, 2017
- Preceded by: Carlos J. Méndez
- Succeeded by: Gabriel Rodríguez Aguiló

At-large Member of the Puerto Rico House of Representatives
- In office January 2, 2013 – January 2, 2017

Member of the Puerto Rico House of Representatives from the 19th District
- In office January 2, 2001 – January 1, 2013
- Preceded by: Ferdinand Lugo
- Succeeded by: Efraín de Jesús

Personal details
- Born: Carlos M. Hernández López; February 19, 1965 (age 61) Mayagüez, Puerto Rico
- Party: Popular Democratic Party (PPD)
- Spouse: Farrah M. Rodríguez
- Children: 1
- Education: University of Puerto Rico at Mayagüez (BA); University of Puerto Rico School of Law (JD); Lyndon B. Johnson School of Public Affairs (MPA)

Carlos M. "Charlie" Hernández López (born February 19, 1965) is a Puerto Rican politician affiliated with the Popular Democratic Party (PPD). He was member of the Puerto Rico House of Representatives from January, 2001 until December, 2016. From 2001 to 2012 he represented District 19 (which includes the cities of Mayagüez and San Germán). In 2012, he was reelected, this time as a Representative At-large until 2016.

After his retirement from politics in 2016, he reopened his law firm and became a professor at the Interamerican University of Puerto Rico.

== Early years and studies ==
Charlie Hernández was born February 19, 1965, in Mayagüez. During his childhood, he was part of the Boy Scouts of America.

After graduating high school, Hernández was admitted to the University of Puerto Rico at Mayagüez. During his time there, he was part of the Student Council and the Academic Senate. He was also founder and director of the student newspaper Campus Colegial. Because of his academic excellence, he received the award for the Most Distinguished Student of the Department of Social Sciences in 1986. He was also part of the Honor roll during the three years in which he finished his bachelor's degree in political science.

After participating in the summer internship of the Woodrow Wilson School of Public and International Affairs of the Princeton University in New Jersey, Hernández received a scholarship to continue postgraduate studies in Public Administration sponsored by the Alfred P. Sloan Foundation, the Woodrow Wilson Foundation, and then the Ford Foundation.

After graduating with honors from the Faculty of Law of the University of Puerto Rico, he continued his studies, obtaining a Master's degree in Public Administration from the Lyndon B. Johnson School of Public Affairs of the University of Texas at Austin. During those years, he realized investigations about the health service and political parties in Mexico, which were eventually published. He also completed a thesis about the Territories of Micronesia and the territorial policy of the United States.

== Professional career ==
After returning to Puerto Rico, Hernández practiced law specializing in civil litigation and constitutional rights. In January, 2000, he was appointed as an Assistant to the mayor of the Municipality of Mayagüez in charge of community development.

== Political career ==
Hernández was first elected to the House of Representatives of Puerto Rico at the 2000 general election, representing District 19. During his first term, he was Chairman of the Judiciary the Committee and Special Committee of the Revision of the Civil Code. He was also a member of the Committees of Federal and International Affairs, Government, Capital Development, and others.

In 2004, Hernández was reelected. During that time, he served as Minority Speaker for his party in several committees as well as being member of others. After being reelected for a third term at the 2008 general election, Hernández again served as Minority Speaker of his party in several committees.

In 2012, Hernández decided to run as a Representative At-large at the 2012 general election. He was elected, being the third candidate with most votes from his party. After that, Hernández was appointed as Majority Leader for his party.

After concluding his mandate in 2016, and after sixteen years in office, Hernández decided to retire from politics. Since, he returned to practice law with offices in San Juan and Mayagüez concentrating in civil litigation and constitutional law. In addition, Hernández became a professor in the graduate program in Public Affairs at the Interamerican University of Puerto Rico.

== Personal life ==
Hernández was married to journalist Damaris Suárez for approximately ten years. They have a son together (Diego Hernández Suárez). In December 2012, they both announced they were getting divorced. In 2018, he married Farrah M Rodríguez.

House of Representatives of Puerto Rico
Preceded by Ferdinand Lugo	Member of the Puerto Rico House of Representatives from the 19th District; 2001-2013	Succeeded by Efraín de Jesús
Preceded by Jenniffer González	Majority Leader of the Puerto Rico House of Representatives; 2013-2017	Succeeded by Gabriel Rodríguez Aguiló
