= Narden Jaime Espinosa =

Puerto Rican politician

Member of the Puerto Rico House of Representatives from the 35th District
- In office January 2, 2009 – January 1, 2017
- Preceded by: Joel Rosario Hernández
- Succeeded by: Samuel Pagán

Member of the Municipal Assembly of Humacao, Puerto Rico
- In office 2001–2008

Personal details
- Born: Humacao, Puerto Rico August 6, 1971 (age 55)
- Party: Popular Democratic Party (PPD)
- Children: 2
- Education: University of Turabo (BBA)

Narden Jaime Espinosa (born August 6, 1971) is a Puerto Rican politician affiliated with the Popular Democratic Party (PPD). He has been a member of the Puerto Rico House of Representatives since 2009 representing District 35.

== Early years and studies ==
Narden Jaime Espinosa was born in Humacao, on August 6, 1971. He is the seventh of ten children. He completed his high school studies at Juan Peña Reyes School in his hometown.

Jaime completed a Bachelor of Business Administration, with a major in Marketing, from the University of Turabo.

== Professional career ==
Jaime began his professional career working for the pharmaceutical Bristol-Myers Squibb. He has also worked as a small retailer, opening two cafeterias, which he then sold.

== Political career ==
Jaime's entrance to active politics was as part of the Legislative Assembly of Humacao. He also served as Municipal Secretary of the same town. Jaime has also served as Special Aide to the House of Representatives of Puerto Rico, assigned to the office of Representative Joel Rosario Hernández.

In 2008, he decided to run for Representative for District 35, under the Popular Democratic Party (PPD). He was elected in the general election that year.

Jaime was reelected in 2012.

== Personal life ==
Jaime is married and has two children.
