= Jaime Perelló =

Speaker of the Puerto Rico House of Representatives

Jaime R. Perelló Borrás
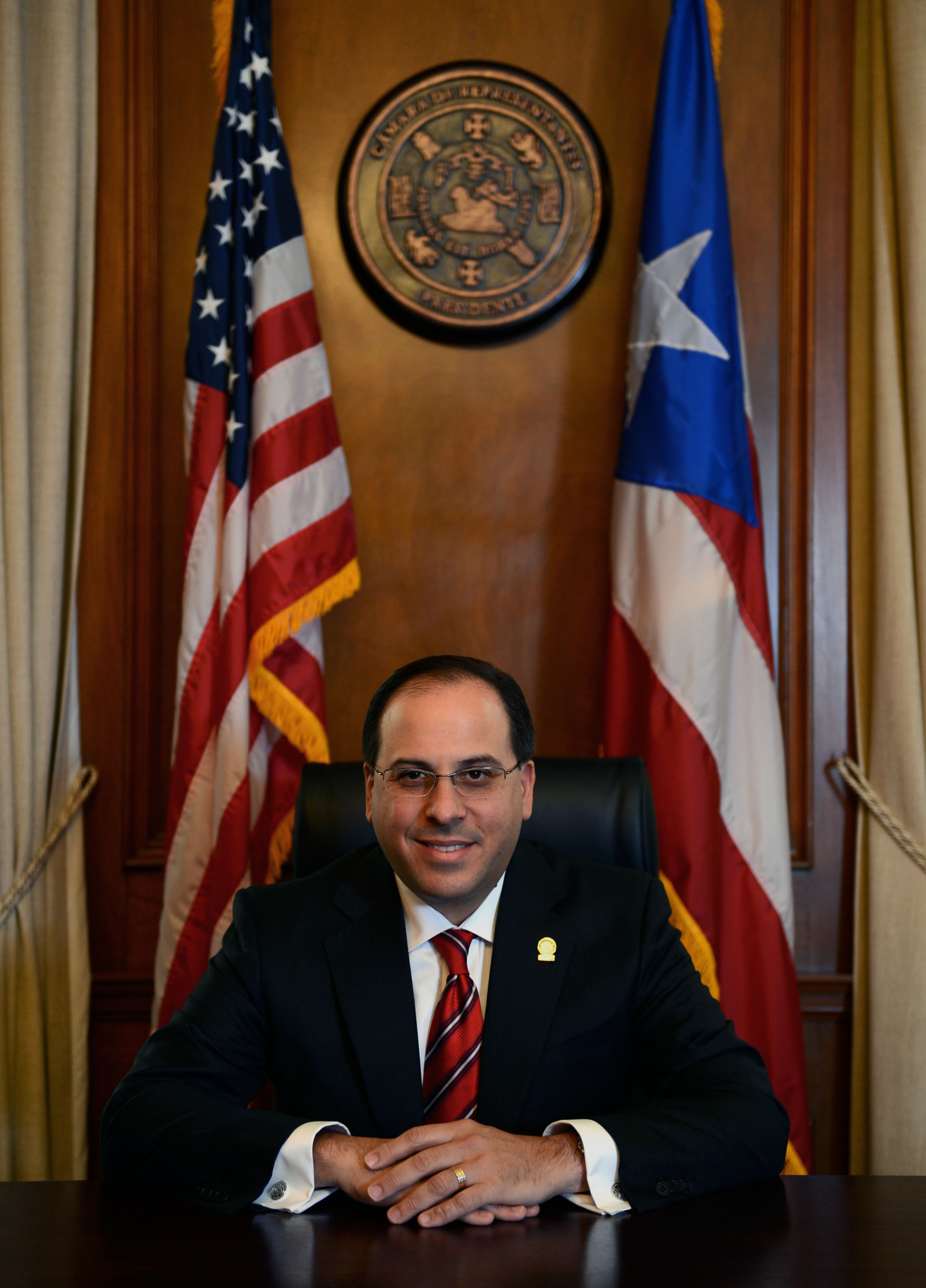

30th Speaker of the House of Representatives of Puerto Rico
- In office January 2, 2013 – August 29, 2016
- Preceded by: Jenniffer González
- Succeeded by: Roberto Rivera Ruiz de Porras

Personal details
- Born: Jaime R. Perelló Borrás; September 14, 1973 (age 53) San Juan, Puerto Rico
- Party: Popular Democratic
- Other political affiliations: Democratic
- Education: Interamerican University of Puerto Rico (BA); Cambridge College (M.Ed.); Georgetown University; George Washington University (MPA)

Jaime R. Perelló Borrás (Note: In this Spanish name, the first or paternal surname is Perelló and the second or maternal family name is Borrás.) (born September 14, 1973) is a Puerto Rican politician. Perelló is affiliated with the Popular Democratic Party of Puerto Rico and the Democratic Party of the United States. He was the 30th Speaker of the House of Representatives of Puerto Rico.

== Early years and studies ==
Jaime Rafael Perelló Borrás was born on September 14, 1973, in San Juan. He studied at the Santa Teresita Academy in Santurce where he was secretary of his class in 1992. Perelló then studied at the Interamerican University of Puerto Rico where he obtained a Bachelor's degree in Political Science in 1998.

Perelló worked as a licensed insurance agent and opened his own insurance firm. In 2005, Perelló completed his Master's degree in Education with a major in Public Administration from Cambridge College in Boston, Massachusetts. He also studied English as a foreign language at Georgetown University in Washington, D.C.and a Master in Public Studies from George Washington University.

== Political career ==
In 2000, Perelló was appointed by José Aponte de la Torre, then Mayor of Carolina, as adviser for health reform. Concerned for the health crisis caused by the Navy bombardments in Vieques, Perelló and Aponte founded the Corporation Salud para Vieques, where he served as part of the Board of Directors.

The next year, Aponte asked him to work as special aide in charge of federal government affairs as well as serving as a liaison with mayors from Puerto Rico and the United States. In 2003, he was arrested people for performing civil disobedience on Vieques, serving 30 days in a federal prison (see United States Navy in Vieques, Puerto Rico).

In 2000 and 2004, Perelló ran for a District Representative's seat and lost against Epi Jimenez, Jr. for the 40th district of Carolina.

In 2005, Perelló worked for the campaign of Fernando Ferrer, the first Puerto Rican to aspire to be Mayor of New York City. In August 2007, Governor Aníbal Acevedo Vilá appointed him as an adviser for municipal affairs.

Perelló ran once again for the Puerto Rico House of Representatives, winning a slot in the primaries of his party in 2008. Later that year, he was elected to his first term in the House at the general elections.

In 2012, Perelló led the team of candidates for representatives of the Popular Democratic Party to achieve a majority in the House of Representative of Puerto Rico.

In November 2012, revalidated to a second term as Representative at-Large and the Popular Democratic Party won the majority in upper house Senate of Puerto Rico and the lower house Puerto Rico House of Representatives. Then the representatives of majority chose Perelló as Speaker of the Puerto Rico House of Representatives.

His father Luis Perelló was executive assistant to Governor Rafael Hernández Colón in his first term. His mother Carmen Borrás was an insurance broker.

In 2007, he received the Missión Accomplishment Award from Cambridge College for his work in the public service.
