= Roberto Rivera Ruiz de Porras =

Puerto Rican politician

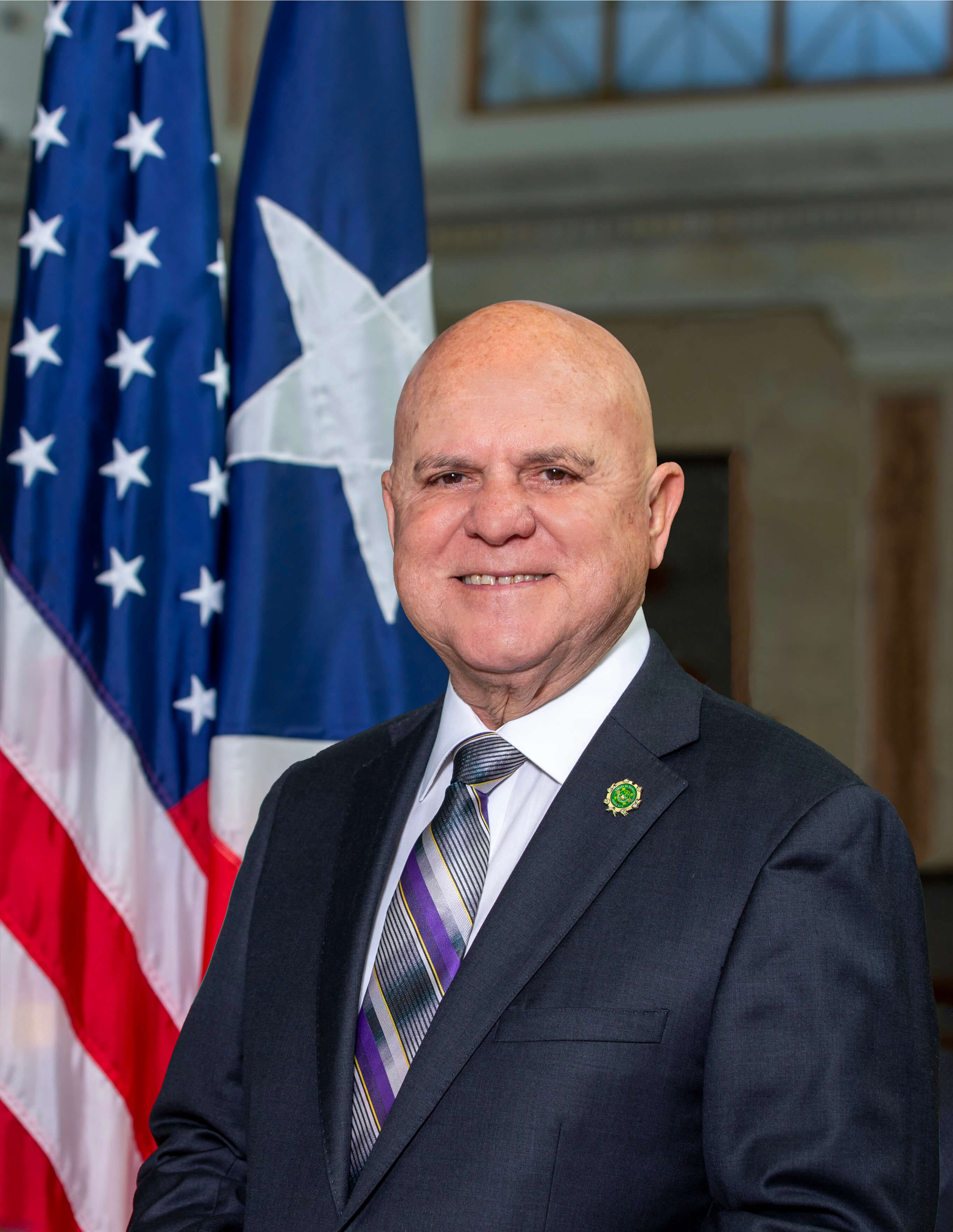

Speaker of the House of Representatives of Puerto Rico Acting
- In office August 29, 2016 – January 2, 2017
- Preceded by: Jaime Perelló
- Succeeded by: Carlos Johnny Méndez

Speaker pro tempore of the House of Representatives of Puerto Rico
- In office January 2, 2013 – January 2, 2017
- Preceded by: Gabriel Rodríguez Aguiló
- Succeeded by: José Torres Zamora

Member of the Puerto Rico House of Representatives from the 39th District
- Incumbent
- Assumed office January 2, 2004
- Preceded by: Epifanio Jiménez

Member of the Puerto Rico House of Representatives from the 40th District
- In office January 2, 2001 – January 2, 2004
- Preceded by: Magdalena Martínez
- Succeeded by: Epifanio Jiménez

Member of the Municipal Assembly of Carolina
- In office January 2, 1989 – January 1, 2001

Personal details
- Born: Roberto Rivera Ruíz de Porras; October 28, 1950 (age 75) Ponce, Puerto Rico
- Party: Popular Democratic Party (PPD)
- Spouse: María del Carmen Fuentes
- Children: 2
- Education: Caribbean University (BBA)

Roberto Rivera Ruiz de Porras (born October 28, 1950) is a Puerto Rican politician affiliated with the Popular Democratic Party (PPD). He has been a member of the Puerto Rico House of Representatives since 2001 representing District 39. Since 2013, he is serving as Speaker pro tempore of the House of Representatives of Puerto Rico.

== Early years and studies ==
Roberto Rivera Ruiz de Porras was born in Ponce on October 28, 1950. He studied at the Colegio San Juan Bosco in the Barrio Cantera.

Rivera Ruiz de Porras completed a degree in Business Management from Caribbean University.

== Professional career ==
Rivera worked for 29 years in the banking industry.

== Political career ==
Rivera began his political career when he became a member of the Municipal Assembly of Carolina in 1989. He served in that position until 2000, when he decided to run for the House of Representatives of Puerto Rico representing District 40. He was elected at the 2000 general election.

Rivera was reelected in 2004, 2008, and 2012. After being reelected in that last election, he was appointed as the House's Speaker pro tempore.

Became acting Speaker of the House of Representatives of Puerto Rico on August 29, 2016 after the resignation of Jaime Perelló.

== Personal life ==
Rivera is married and has two children.

House of Representatives of Puerto Rico
Preceded by Epifanio Jiménez	Member of the Puerto Rico House of Representatives from the 39th District; 2004–Present	Succeeded by Incumbent
Preceded by Magdalena Martínez	Member of the Puerto Rico House of Representatives from the 40th District; 2001–2004	Succeeded by Epifanio Jiménez
Preceded by Gabriel Rodríguez Aguiló	Speaker pro tempore of the Puerto Rico House of Representatives; 2013–2017	Succeeded by José Torres Zamora
Preceded by Urayoán Hernández	Majority Whip of the Puerto Rico House of Representatives; 2021–2024	Succeeded by Wilson Román
Political offices
Preceded by Jaime Perelló	Speaker of the House of Representatives of Puerto Rico; Acting; 2016–2017	Succeeded by Carlos Johnny Méndez
