= Waldemar Quiles =

Puerto Rican politician

Member of the Puerto Rico House of Representatives from the 22nd District
- In office January 2, 2009 – January 1, 2017
- Preceded by: Javier Rivera Aquino
- Succeeded by: Michael A. Quiñones Irizarry
- In office January 2, 1993 – January 1, 2005
- Preceded by: Héctor López Galarza
- Succeeded by: Javier Rivera Aquino

Mayor of Utuado
- In office 1981–1989
- Preceded by: Edwin Ralat
- Succeeded by: Jesús Lugo Montalvo

President of the Municipal Assembly of Utuado
- In office 1977–1981

Member of the Municipal Assembly of Utuado
- In office 1973–1981

Personal details
- Born: December 29, 1940 (age 85) Camuy, Puerto Rico
- Party: New Progressive Party (PNP)
- Spouse: María del Carmen Llanes Medina (divorced)
- Children: 6
- Education: University of Puerto Rico (BA, M.Ed.)

Waldemar Quiles Rodríguez (born December 29, 1940) is a Puerto Rican politician affiliated with the New Progressive Party (PNP). He has been a member of the Puerto Rico House of Representatives for two separate instances (1993–2005, 2009–2017) representing District 22. Quiles also served as Mayor of Utuado from 1981 to 1989.

== Early years and studies ==
Waldemar Quiles was born on December 29, 1940, in Camuy, Puerto Rico.

Quiles completed a Bachelor's degree in Arts from the University of Puerto Rico in 1965. In 1971, he completed his Master's degree in Education, also from the University of Puerto Rico, graduating magna cum laude. In 1978, Quiles studied law at IAU.

== Professional career ==
Quiles is certified as an elementary and junior high school teacher, and also as director and superintendent of schools.

== Political career ==
Quiles began his political career in 1973, when he became part of the Municipal Assembly of Utuado. In 1977, he became President of the Assembly. Also, from 1977 to 1980, Quiles was the Auxiliary Administrator at the Administration of Permits and Regulations (ARPE).

From 1981 to 1989, Quiles served as Mayor of Utuado.

Quiles was first elected to the House of Representatives of Puerto Rico at the 1992 general election, representing District 22. During his first term, he presided the Commission of Cooperativism, and served as vice president of the Commission of Education and Culture.

Quiles was reelected at the 1996 general election, after which he presided the Treasury Commission. From 2001 to 2003, Quiles was President of the Commission of Public Service.

Quiles decided not to run for reelection at the 2004 general election. During that term, he served as Advisor to the Mayor of Toa Baja, Aníbal Vega Borges, and to the Speaker of the House, José Aponte Hernández.

Quiles returned to active politics for the 2008 general election, where he was reelected again to represent District 22. He was again reelected in 2012.

== Personal life ==
Quiles was married to María del Carmen Llanes Medina. They divorced in 2002. Quiles has six children.

House of Representatives of Puerto Rico
Preceded by Javier Rivera Aquino	Member of the Puerto Rico House of Representatives from the 22nd District; January 2, 2009–January 1, 2017	Succeeded by Michael A. Quiñones Irizarry
Preceded by Héctor López Galarza	Member of the Puerto Rico House of Representatives from the 22nd District; January 2, 1993-January 1, 2005	Succeeded by Javier Rivera Aquino
Political offices
Preceded by Edwin Ralat	Mayor of Utuado, Puerto Rico; 1981–1989	Succeeded by Jesús Lugo Montalvo
