= Liza Fernández Rodríguez =

Puerto Rican politician (born 1973)

Member of the Puerto Rico Senate from the San Juan district
- In office 2012 – January 1, 2013
- Preceded by: Roberto Arango

Member of the Puerto Rico House of Representatives from the 4th District
- In office January 2, 2005 – 2012
- Preceded by: Jenniffer González
- Succeeded by: Víctor Parés

Personal details
- Born: July 23, 1973 (age 53) San Juan Puerto Rico
- Party: New Progressive Party (PNP)
- Other political affiliations: Democratic Party
- Spouse: Angel Pérez Otero (2006-present)
- Children: Valeria Angélica (b. 2007); Lorena Angeliz (b. 2008)
- Education: Universidad del Sagrado Corazón (BA); Interamerican University of Puerto Rico School of Law (JD)
- Profession: Attorney, politician

Liza Fernández Rodríguez (born July 23, 1973) is a Puerto Rican attorney and politician affiliated with the New Progressive Party (PNP). Fernández was a member of the House of Representatives of Puerto Rico from 2005 to 2012, and of the Senate of Puerto Rico from 2012 to 2013. In December 2012, after her electoral defeat, Fernández was confirmed as a Superior Judge.

Fernández is married to Guaynabo ex-mayor Angel Pérez Otero.

== Early years and studies ==
Liza Fernández was born and raised in San Juan. In 1995, she completed a bachelor's degree in communications from the Universidad del Sagrado Corazón, graduating magna cum laude, meaning "with great honor". She was also included in the National Dean's List for her academic excellence. That same year, she was admitted to the Faculty of Law of the Interamerican University of Puerto Rico School of Law. She completed her law degree in 1998. By 2001, Fernández was working as an attorney for the Municipality of San Juan, where she served in its legal affairs office.

== Professional career ==
After graduating, Fernández worked as part of the U.S. Small Business Administration Disaster Assistance Group.

Since 2001, Fernández has worked as an attorney for the city of San Juan, as Coordinator of the Contract Division in the Office of Legal Affairs.

== Political career ==
In 2003, Fernández decided to run for the House of Representatives of Puerto Rico to represent District 4. She was elected at the 2004 general election. After one term, she was reelected in 2008. During her time as a Representative, she was Chairwoman of the House Judiciary Committee and the Joint Commissions for the Revision of the Civil and Penal Codes. She was also a member of the Treasury, San Juan Development, Labor Relations, and Women's Affairs Committees.

In 2011, Fernández confirmed her intention of running for the seat left vacant by Roberto Arango in the Senate of Puerto Rico. After being elected in a Special Election held in March 2012, Fernández became president of the Commission of Commerce and Cooperativism, as well as member of the Commissions of Government, and Woman's Affairs.

Fernández ran for reelection to the Senate at the 2012 general election, but was defeated by the candidates of the Popular Democratic Party (PPD).

In December 2012, Fernández was confirmed as a Superior Judge by the Senate of Puerto Rico.

== Personal life ==
Fernández married fellow representative Angel Pérez Otero in 2006. They have two daughters together: Valeria Angélica (b. 2007) and Lorena Angeliz (b. 2008).
