= Sonia Pacheco =

Puerto Rican politician

Member of the Puerto Rico House of Representatives from the 3rd District
- In office January 2, 2013 – January 2, 2017
- Preceded by: Albita Rivera Ramírez
- Succeeded by: Juan O. Morales Rodríguez

Personal details
- Born: Ponce, Puerto Rico
- Party: Popular Democratic Party (PPD)
- Education: Universidad del Sagrado Corazón (MA)

Sonia Pacheco Irigoyen is a Puerto Rican born in Ponce, PR and resident of San Juan, PR is a politician affiliated with the Popular Democratic Party (PPD). She was elected to the Puerto Rico House of Representatives in 2012 to represent District 3. She did a Masters in marketing at the University of Phoenix in Puerto Rico. she also earned a master's degree in public relations from the Universidad del Sagrado Corazón.
