= Gabriel Rodríguez Aguiló =

Member of the Puerto Rico House of Representatives

Gabriel Rodríguez
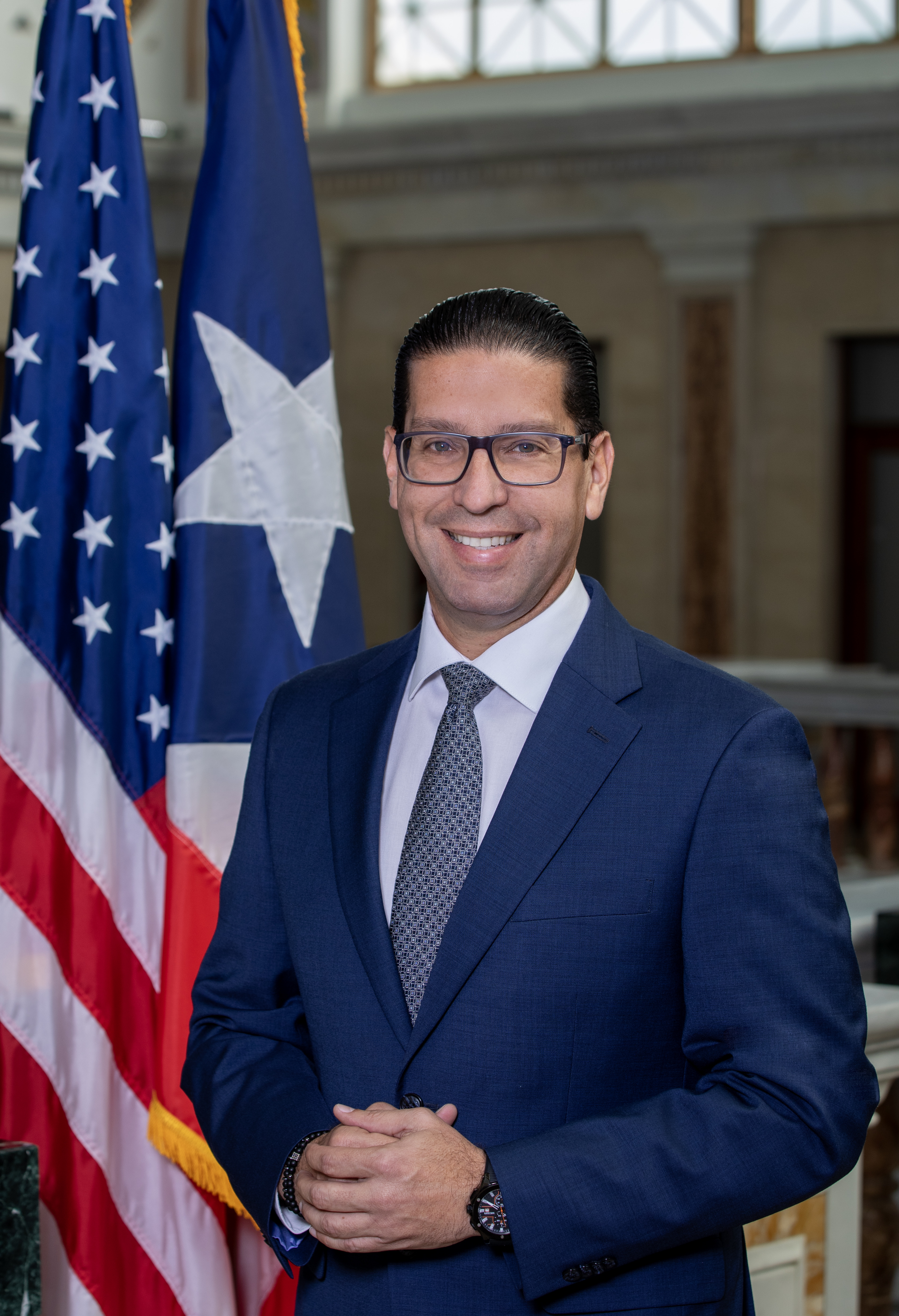

Majority Leader of the Puerto Rico House of Representatives
- In office January 2, 2017 – January 1, 2021
- Preceded by: Charlie Hernández
- Succeeded by: Ángel Matos García

Speaker pro tempore of the Puerto Rico House of Representatives
- In office January 2, 2009 – January 1, 2013
- Preceded by: Epifanio Jiménez
- Succeeded by: Roberto Rivera Ruiz

Member of the Puerto Rico House of Representatives from the at-large district
- Incumbent
- Assumed office January 2, 2025

Member of the Puerto Rico House of Representatives from the 13th district
- In office January 2, 2005 – January 2, 2025
- Preceded by: Luis Maldonado
- Succeeded by: Jerry Nieves Rosario

Personal details
- Born: August 19, 1973 (age 52) Ciales, Puerto Rico
- Party: New Progressive
- Education: University of Puerto Rico at Arecibo (AS); National University College (AS); University of Phoenix (BBA)

Gabriel Rodríguez Aguiló (born August 19, 1973) is a Puerto Rican politician affiliated with the New Progressive Party (PNP). He has been a member of the Puerto Rico House of Representatives since 2004.

== Early life ==
Gabriel Rodríguez Aguiló was born on August 19, 1973, from Ciales, Puerto Rico.

He holds an associate degree in Chemical Engineering Technology from the University of Puerto Rico at Arecibo and an associate degree as a Pharmacy Assistant from the National University College of the same city. He also holds a Bachelor of Business Administration (BA) from the University of Phoenix.

== Professional career ==
Rodríguez worked for four years as a pharmacy assistant until 2003.

== Political career ==
Rodríguez Aguiló was chosen by his party at the 2003 primaries for an election spot. He was elected as a Representative for District 13 at the 2004 general elections. During his first term, he served as president of the Commission of Health, and the Joint Commission of Health Rights.

In 2008, Rodríguez Aguiló was reelected for a second term as representative. After being sworn in, Rodríguez was appointed as Speaker Pro Tempore of the House of Representatives.

Rodríguez was reelected in the 2012 general election and the 2016 general election.

House of Representatives of Puerto Rico
Preceded by Luis Maldonado	Member of the Puerto Rico House of Representatives from the 13th district 2005–2025	Succeeded by Jerry Nieves Rosario
Preceded by Epifanio Jiménez	Speaker pro tempore of the Puerto Rico House of Representatives; 2009–2013	Succeeded by Roberto Rivera Ruiz
Preceded by Charlie Hernández	Majority Leader of the Puerto Rico House of Representatives; 2017–2021	Succeeded by Ángel Matos García
Preceded by Ramón Luis Cruz	Minority Whip of the Puerto Rico House of Representatives; 2021–2024	Succeeded by Domingo J. Torres García
