= Interamerican University of Puerto Rico School of Law =

Law school in San Juan, Puerto Rico

Inter American University of Puerto Rico School of Law
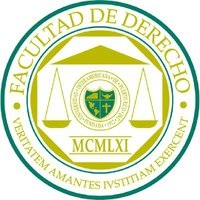
- Established: 1961 (65 years ago)
- School type: Private
- Dean: Julio Fontanet Maldonado
- Location: San Juan, Puerto Rico
- Bar pass rate: 29% (General Bar in 2018), 41% (Notarial Bar in 2018)
- Website: www.derecho.inter.edu
- ABA profile: Inter American University School of Law

The Interamerican University of Puerto Rico, Faculty of Law (Spanish: Facultad de Derecho de la Universidad Interamericana de Puerto Rico) is the school of law of the Interamerican University of Puerto Rico, a private co-educational corporation accredited by the Middle States Association of Colleges and Schools (Commission on Higher Education), the Puerto Rico Council of Higher Education, and the Commonwealth of Puerto Rico Department of Education. The School of Law is approved by the American Bar Association (ABA) and is located in San Juan, the capital city of Puerto Rico. Since its founding, the School of Law has succeeded in meeting the needs of the legal profession, in particular, and Puerto Rico's society in general.

== Student body ==
The incoming class for academic year 2012–2013 was composed of 128 students. The student body comes mainly from Puerto Rico, although applicants from the mainland are encouraged to apply.

== Facilities ==
The law school has developed its library into a center of access to traditional library services as well as computerized legal research services. In 1993, the school was relocated to a new building that features seven classrooms, seminar rooms, a library, a legal clinic, faculty offices, a conference room, a lounge, a Continuing Legal Education Program office, Interamerican School of Law Review offices, student organization offices, administrative offices, a chapel, a student center, a cafeteria, a bookstore, an auditorium with a seating capacity of 310, parking, and more. The site has been landscaped. In January 1990, the library signed a collaboration agreement to establish a consortium with the law school library of the Pontifical Catholic University of Puerto Rico and the library of the Supreme Court of Puerto Rico, with the purpose of coordinating collection development and sharing its resources through an automated bibliographic network, interlibrary loans, and telecommunication services.

== Curriculum ==
The Juris Doctor (J.D.) program covers three years in the day division and four years in the evening division. Candidates must complete a minimum of 92 credit hours with a GPA of at least 2.00 to qualify for graduation. Interamerican University Faculty of Law offers a three-week preparation course to be taken during the summer on a compulsory basis by students admitted to the school. Students who enter law school must be willing to make a heavy commitment.

== Admissions ==
Proficiency in Spanish is essential to the program. Applicants must have a minimum grade-point average of 2.5, an immunization certificate (for students ages 21 and below), and a police department certificate of good conduct; those seeking admission may also be required to appear for a personal interview. Candidates are required to take the Examen de Admisión a Estudios de Posgrado (EXADEP), the Aptitude Test for Graduate Education, and the Law School Admission Test (LSAT). Students should attain a 575 minimum score on the EXADEP and a minimum score of 130 on the LSAT. Application forms and other relevant information concerning the EXADEP may be obtained from Educational Testing Service, American International Plaza, 250 Muñoz Rivera Avenue, Suite 315, Hato Rey, PR 00918. In 2015, Interamerican began a J.D in English program. The purpose of the program was to attract students from the United States.

On May 15, 2020, the council of the American Bar Association’s Section of Legal Education and Admissions to the Bar met remotely and determined this school and nine others had significant noncompliance with Standard 316. This Standard was revised in 2019 to provide that at least 75% of an accredited law school’s graduates who took a bar exam must pass one within two years of graduation. The school was asked to submit a report by Feb. 1, 2021; and, if the council did not find the report demonstrated compliance, the school would be asked to appear before the council at its May, 2021 meeting. In 2022, the council gave the school a three-year extension for bar pass compliance. In early 2024, based on statistics for 2021 graduates, the school had a two year passrate of just 65.84%.

== Housing ==
The university does not provide housing for law students. However, the areas surrounding the School of Law contain many private houses, apartments, and condominiums for rent.

== Activities ==
Student organizations include the student council, an organization that represents the student body and participates in matters of administrative policy related to students' interests. Council representatives serve on various faculty committees as well as the university senate and the board of trustees. Other student organizations are the Law Student Division of the American Bar Association; the Phi Alpha Delta Law Fraternity (composed not only of law students, but also of distinguished honorary members who are supreme court justices, federal district court judges, and prominent attorneys); the National Association of Law Students; the Women Law Students Association; United Students Forging an Environmental Consciousness; the Law Student Division of the Interamerican Federation of Lawyers; the Association of Trial Lawyers of America; the Hispanic National Bar Association; the Federal Bar Association; the Student's Cooperative Bookstore; the Sports Law Association and the Hispanic Notarial Bar Association. The Interamerican School of Law Review is the official publication of the School of Law. Its members work under the supervision of an editorial board of four students chosen on the basis of merit and dedication to the Law Review and an academic advisor who is a faculty member appointed by the dean.

== Clinical programs ==
The faculty's Legal Aid Clinical Program is integrated with the Community Law Office through a combined effort of the US Legal Services Corporation and Interamerican University. Law students are provided with the opportunity to learn skills such as interviewing, negotiation, counseling, fact gathering and analysis, legal research and drafting, decision making about alternative strategies, and preparation for trial and field practice. They also represent clients before administrative agencies and courts under the close supervision of the program's staff attorney-professors, pursuant to the rules of the Supreme Court of Puerto Rico. Students also gain practical experience by serving with Puerto Rico Legal Services, Inc.; the San Juan Community Law Office, Inc.; the Legal Aid Society of Puerto Rico; the district attorney's offices; and the Environmental Quality Board.

== Career services ==
The mission of the Career Placement Office is to prepare students and alumni for the legal job market by encouraging them to conduct self-assessments in an effort to focus their job searches, as well as to educate students and alumni on their legal and nonlegal options in today's competitive legal market. This is accomplished through a variety of services including, but not limited to, individual counseling, group seminars, self-assessment materials, interviewing programs, a career resource library, and the alumni network.

== Continuing education ==
The Continuing Legal Education (CLE) program offers advanced courses and seminars concerning different fields of law that may be of interest to practicing lawyers as well as to the community in general.

The CLE program offers courses in the following categories: specialized courses for specialists; refresher courses for experienced lawyers; courses in emerging or nontraditional areas of law, and courses focused on developing lawyering skills.

== Cost and financial aid ==
As of the date this report was published, the cost per credit is $485. Once admitted, the student pays $125 to reserve a place in the class and $435 for the preparatory course that takes place in July. There is a deferred payment plan and financial aid options that include the Federal Direct Loan Program, Stafford Loan, the Commonwealth Education Fund, the State Student Incentive Grants program, the Federal Work-Study Program, and alternative loans for the regular academic program as well as for bar study (Alternative Bar Loans). The university also has an Honor Scholarship program for law students based on academic accomplishment and financial need.

== Notable alumni ==
- Alejandro García Padilla - former Governor of Puerto Rico
- Jenniffer González - Resident Commissioner of Puerto Rico
- Rosa Emilia Rodríguez - former United States Attorney for the District of Puerto Rico
- Thomas Rivera Schatz - former President of the Senate of Puerto Rico
- Wanda Vázquez Garced - former Governor of Puerto Rico
- Daniel Lopéz Romo -United States Attorney for the District of Puerto Rico, Brigadier General and assistant adjutant general for Air, Puerto Rico Air National Guard.
