= Lydia Méndez Silva =

Puerto Rican politician

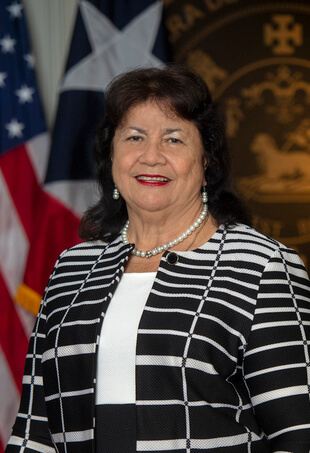

Member of the Puerto Rico House of Representatives from the 21st District
- In office January 2, 1997 – December 31, 2024
- Preceded by: Presby Santiago
- Succeeded by: Omayra Martínez

Personal details
- Born: January 11 San Germán, Puerto Rico
- Party: Popular Democratic Party (PPD)
- Education: University of Puerto Rico at Mayagüez

Lydia Méndez Silva is a Puerto Rican politician affiliated with the Popular Democratic Party (PPD). She has been a member of the Puerto Rico House of Representatives since 1997 representing District 21.

== Early years and studies ==
Lydia R. Méndez Silva was born on January 11 in San Germán. She began studying in José C. Barbosa Elementary School in Sabana Grande, and continued in José A. Castillo Junior High School and Luis Muñoz Rivera High School, where she graduated.

In 1972, Méndez began studying Practical Nursing at the Rodriguez Army Health Clinic at Fort Buchanan, Puerto Rico. Méndez received her degree in Nursing from the University of Puerto Rico at Mayagüez.

== Professional career and public service ==
While studying, Méndez worked at the University Hospital of Centro Médico in San Juan. After graduating, she went on to work at the Dr. Tito Mattei Hospital in Yauco, specifically in the Intensive care unit. In 1985, she worked for the Corporation of Social Action of Puerto Rico as an Assistant Worker of Isolated Communities.

In 1989, Méndez began working in Sabana Grande as Community Coordinator during the tenure of Mayor Angel A. Figueroa Ramírez. In 1993, she began working as Special Aide of Mayor Miguel Ortiz Vélez until 1996.

== Political career ==
Méndez began her political career as a voting college volunteer. She then served as Secretary of the PPD Committee in Barrio Rayo Guaras, Sabana Grande. She was also a delegate of the PPD Youth and a member of the RHC Youth in 1976.

Méndez was first elected to the House of Representatives of Puerto Rico in 1996. After being sworn in, she was appointed as her party speaker in the Commissions of Tourism, Women Affairs, and Socioeconomic Development.

Méndez was reelected at the 2000 general election, and became President of the Commission of Social Welfare in the House, as well as Vice-president of the Commissions of Health and Women Affairs. She also served as member of the Commissions of South Region, Tourism, Housing, and Internal Affairs, among others.

Méndez has been reelected five more times (2004, 2008, 2012, 2016, 2020).

Lydia Méndez Silva announced she will not seek re-election after 28 years at the 21st district for the 2024 elections.
