= House of Representatives of Puerto Rico =

Lower house of the Legislative Assembly of Puerto Rico

House of Representatives of Puerto Rico Cámara de Representantes de Puerto Rico
- 32nd House of Representatives of Puerto Rico

Type
- Type: Lower house of the Legislative Assembly of Puerto Rico

Leadership
- Speaker: Johnny Méndez (PNP)
- Vice Speakers: Yashira Lebrón Rodríguez (PNP); Angel Peña Ramírez (PNP)
- Majority Leader: José Pichy Torres Zamora (PNP)
- Majority Whip: Wilson Román López (PNP)
- Minority Leaders: Héctor Ferrer Santiago (PPD); Denis Márquez Lebrón (PIP); Lisie Burgos Muñiz (PD)
- Minority Whips: Domingo Torres García (PPD); Adriana Gutiérrez Colón (PIP)

Structure
- Seats: 53
- Political groups: Majority (36) PNP (36) Minority (17) PPD (13) PIP (3) PD (1)

Elections
- Voting system: First-past-the-post for 40 electoral districts seats and Single non-transferable vote for 11 at-large seats (Note: The House can increase its number of representatives when in a general election more than two-thirds of the members of the House are elected from one political party or from a single ticket.)
- Last election: 5 November 2024
- Next election: 7 November 2028

Meeting place
- Capitol of Puerto Rico, San Juan, Puerto Rico

Website
- camara.pr.gov

The House of Representatives of Puerto Rico (Spanish: Cámara de Representantes de Puerto Rico) is the lower house of the Legislative Assembly of Puerto Rico, the bicameral territorial legislature of Puerto Rico. The House, together with the Senate, control the legislative branch of the government of Puerto Rico.

The structure and responsibilities of the House are defined in Article III of the Constitution of Puerto Rico, which vests all legislative power in the Legislative Assembly. Every bill must be passed by the Senate and by the House, and signed by the governor in order to become law.

The House has exclusive power to initiate impeachments and bring an indictment. The constitution also establishes that the appointment of the Secretary of State and the Comptroller require the advice and consent of the House, with all other appointments confirmed by the Senate alone. Financially, all bills for raising revenue must originate in the House.

Structurally, the House is normally composed of 51 members. Forty are elected from single-member districts across the commonwealth (with one representative per district), elected through Single-member Plurality while 11 are elected at-large through Single non-transferable voting.

The House has been meeting since 1900, after the enactment of the Foraker Act established the body formally.

The House of Representatives, along with its members and staff, is housed in the western half of the Capitol of Puerto Rico, namely in the Ernesto Ramos Antonini House Annex Building, the Antonio R. Barceló Building, and the Luis A. Ferré Building.

== History ==
Created in 1900 as the House of Delegates under the Foraker Act, the lower body of the Puerto Rico Legislative Assembly was the only elected body until the Senate was created in 1917 under the Jones-Shafroth Act, then creating a bicameral legislature.

The House of Delegates was controlled by the Republican Party from its creation in 1900 through 1904. In January 1905, the House switched to control by the Union Party, which would remain in power until 1924. A coalition of the Republican Party and Socialist Party of Puerto Rico controlled the House until 1944, save for a brief period from 1941 to 1943 of the Popular Democratic Party.

After the Popular Democratic Party's landslide victory in 1944, that party controlled the House until 1969, when the New Progressive Party won the House and the governorship, but not the Senate, creating Puerto Rico's first split government. Ángel Viera Martínez, a former prosecutor and freshman representative from San Juan, was elected to the first of three stints as Speaker.

In 1973, the Popular Democratic Party reacquired control of the House but was ousted as the majority party in the 1976 elections, won by the New Progressive Party. Viera Martínez was elected in 1977, to his second stint as Speaker.

As a result of the 1980 elections, the New Progressive Party had won 26 seats and the Popular Democratic Party 25, but the latter challenged the results of the 35th Representative District, creating a tie with each party holding 25 seats, pending the final results of that district. Since the new House in 1981 was tied, it was unable to elect a Speaker, as required, by an absolute majority. To complicate matters, Ramón Muñiz (PDP-32nd District) died on the House floor in January 1981 and Representative-elect Fernando Tonos Florenzán's election was invalidated due to him not having the Constitutionally required 25 years to serve in the House, leaving the House with 25 New Progressives and 23 Popular Democrats. House Secretary Cristino Bernazard, who normally would have presided over the House only until it elected its new Speaker in its inaugural session, became the first unelected Acting Speaker of the House. During Bernazard's incumbency, he appointed co-chairs to the House standing committees and required that all House decisions and legislation be approved by consensus. After some political wrangling, in what became known as the Viera-Colberg Pact, the House elected Viera Martínez once again as Speaker for the remainder of 1981 and maverick Popular Democratic Rep. Severo Colberg Ramírez as Speaker from 1982 until 1984. In late 1981, the Supreme Court ruled in favor of the Popular Democratic candidate in the 35th District, and with the Popular Democrats finally filling in the two vacancies they had, that party gained control of the House, with a majority of 26.

Even though the Popular Democratic Party retained the House in the 1984 general elections, Colberg decided to comply with a party commitment and endorse a new Speaker, José Ronaldo "Rony" Jarabo who served as Speaker from 1985 to 1992. Jarabo was defeated in a primary in 1992, and as the New Progressive Party won the 1992 general elections, he was succeeded by the first woman Speaker, Zaida Hernandez Torres, who served until 1996, when she left the House to run for Mayor of San Juan.

Hernandez's Speaker pro Tempore, Edison Misla Aldarondo, became Speaker in 1997. After he left office in 2000, he was convicted of corruption charges in federal and state courts. He was succeeded in office by Carlos Vizcarrondo during the 2001–2004 term.

In 2005, as a Popular Democratic governor took office, the New Progressive Party controlled the Senate and the House, and José Aponte Hernández, a loyalist of former governor Pedro Rosselló, was elected as Speaker of the House. In addition to the tension with the executive branch, Aponte's term was tinged with greater-than-average tension with the Senate, in which his support for Rossello's bid to oust Senate President Kenneth McClintock, whom he called a "traitor" to his party, took him to lead over 20 New Progressive representatives to converge on the Senate floor in opposition to McClintock's permanence as Senate President, considered by many the all-time historical low-point in Senate–House relations.

Aponte was defeated for re-election as speaker in the House caucus held after the 2008 general elections, and Jenniffer A. González Colón became the speaker, taking office on 12 January 2009.

The current Speaker, as of 2025, is Carlos Johnny Méndez.

== Functions ==
The House of Representatives, along with the Senate of Puerto Rico, are in charge of the legislative power of the Government of Puerto Rico.

The House has exclusive power to initiate impeachment proceedings and, with the concurrence of two-thirds of the total number of members of which it is composed, to bring an indictment. The Constitution also establishes that all bills for raising revenue shall originate in the House. The appointment of the Secretary of State shall in addition require the advice and consent of the House.

== Membership ==
=== Qualifications ===
Article III of the Constitution of Puerto Rico states that no person can be a member of the House of Representatives unless the candidate:

- is capable of reading and writing in either Spanish or English;
- is a citizen of the United States;
- has resided in Puerto Rico for at least two years immediately prior to the date of his election or appointment; and,
- is over twenty-five years of age.

=== Elections ===
Structure of the House of Representatives for the purpose of elections. Puerto Rico is divided into forty (40) districts with one representative per district. An additional eleven (11) representatives are elected at-large. Both groups serve alongside each other with the same powers and rights.

Elections to the House are held every four years on the Tuesday after the first Monday of November, along with the elections for governor, resident commissioner, the Senate, the mayors, and the municipal assemblies. The last election was held on 3 November 2020 where the members of the 31st House of Representatives of Puerto Rico House of Representatives of Puerto Rico were elected. The next election is scheduled for 5 November 2024 where the members of the 30th House of Representatives of Puerto Rico will be elected. Members of the House are elected for a four-years term.

Only a US Citizen that meets all the following requirements may vote for representatives:

- must legally reside in Puerto Rico,
- must be at least 18 years old by the date of the election,
- must have been qualified by the Puerto Rico State Commission on Elections before the election or on the very same day of the election after he presents himself to his nearest place of voting and shows proper documentation, and
- must have not been declared mentally incapacitated by court.

Structure of representative districts in Puerto Rico.

Citizens cast their votes in colleges (Spanish: colegios) which are simply usually the nearest public school to where the voter declared as residence. Votes are required by law to be cast in secret, unless the citizen has a physical impairment that does not allow him to. Those citizens unable to travel to colleges due to medical impairments may vote at their place of residence (homes, elder homes, etc.) or wherever they are convalescing (hospitals, clinics, etc.). In both of these extraordinary cases, officials from the Puerto Rico State Commission on Elections will provide aid so that the citizens can cast their vote—either by using verbal or non-verbal communication—with members from the different political parties required to observe the process in order to ensure accuracy, fairness, transparency, order, and legitimacy.

Ballots are redacted in both English and Spanish regardless of whether English is an official language or not. (Note: English has been removed as an official language several times throughout Puerto Rico's modern history, but ballots must be redacted in English too regardless.)

To elect the members of the House, Puerto Rico is divided into forty (40) representative districts that do not follow a particular pattern; they are strictly based on a similar number of inhabitants. These districts are in turn divided into one or more precincts: an electoral division which, in turn, is constituted by colleges. For each district, citizens may vote only for one candidate from the district in which they declared residence by first-past-the-post. District representatives are expected to give priority to matters related to the district they represent but are not required to do so by law.

In addition, citizens are allowed to vote for one candidate at-large of their preference by single non-transferable vote. The eleven at-large candidates with the majority of votes serve as representatives at-large alongside the district representatives with the same powers and rights. Representatives at-large are expected to serve any individual or group but are not required to do so by law; they also serve as a mechanism for citizens who do not wish to channel their affairs through their district representative for whatever reason.

=== Term ===
Representatives serve terms of four years each. A member who has been elected, but not yet seated, is called a "representative-elect"; a member who has been appointed to a seat, but not yet seated, is called a "representative-designate". The Puerto Rico Constitution does not provide for term limits.

=== Salary and benefits ===
The annual salary for full-time work of each representative is US$73,775 annually, except for the Speaker which receives US$110,663, and the Speaker pro tempore, the Majority and Minority Leaders, the Majority and Minority Whips, and the presidents of the Commission on Government and the Commission on Treasury which receive US$84,841 each.

Representatives are allowed to generate additional income from outside their legislative employment subject to restrictions, and only the representatives which do not receive an annual salary are entitled to additional benefits such as per diem or car allowance. Costs associated to traveling outside of Puerto Rico is reimbursed. Cost-of-living adjustments have been frozen since 2005. All representatives qualify for the same retirement and health benefits as of all other employees of the government of Puerto Rico.

In addition, all representatives are provided with office space, secretarial services, advisors, support personnel, office supplies, and stationery. Hiring of personnel working directly for each representative is at the discretion of each representative. Rather than providing these resources and services directly, representatives are instead assigned a budget from which they retrieve funds to cover such costs. Representatives that preside commissions are assigned larger budgets than those who do not, thus creating a difference between the budgets assigned to representatives from the party holding a majority in the House versus the ones in minority as majority representatives tend to be the ones who preside commissions.

== Majority and minority parties ==
The "Majority party" is the political party that holds a majority of seats. The next-largest party is known as the minority party. The president pro tempore, committee chairs, and some other officials are generally from the majority party.

Section 9 of Article III of the Constitution of Puerto Rico states that should a Party control more than two-thirds of the seats in the House of Representatives, the losing candidates with the most percentage of votes will be given seats in the Legislature until the total of minority members reaches seventeen (17). In order to qualify to a Section 9 seat, the candidates must belong to a party that received a minimum number of votes in the General Elections of that year.

== Officers ==
The House is served by several officers with and without voting powers, and elected from within and outside its ranks. Of these, only the Speaker was established by the Constitution; all other officers were established by internal rules adopted by each session of the House. Only the Speaker, Speaker pro tempore, the Majority and Minority Leaders, and the Majority and Minority Whips have voting powers as all are elected from within. Non-voting officers are elected from outside House ranks and simply assist in internal procedures and clerical tasks, and in the observance of internal rules, laws, and the Constitution. Typical non-voting officers include the Secretary, the Sergeant-at-Arms, and other officers appointed by the different commissions as part of their own internal affairs.

=== Speaker ===
The Speaker of the House is the highest-ranking officer and the presiding officer of the House. The post was created by Article III of the Constitution of Puerto Rico which establishes that, "[...]the House of Representatives [shall elect] a Speaker from among [its] members." The speaker is substituted by the Speaker pro tempore in his absence. Its counterpart in the Senate is the President.

The current speaker is Carlos Johnny Méndez, representative District 36 from the New Progressive Party.

=== Speaker pro tempore ===
The Speaker pro tempore is the second-highest-ranking officer of the House of Representatives and substitutes the Speaker of the House in his absence. Its counterpart in the Senate is the President pro tempore.

The current speakers pro tempore are Yashira Lebrón Rodríguez and Ángel Peña Ramírez, both district representatives from the 8th and 33rd districts, respectively.

=== Party leaders ===
Each party elects floor leaders denominated "Majority leader" or "Minority leader", accordingly, as well as a "Majority Whip" or a "Minority Whip". Floor leaders act as the party chief spokespeople. Currently, the floor leaders are:

- Majority Leader: José Pichy Torres Zamora (PNP)
- Majority Whip: Wilson Román López (PNP)
- Minority Leaders:
  - Héctor Ferrer Santiago (PPD)
  - Denis Márquez Lebrón (PIP)
  - Lisie Burgos Muñiz (PD)
- Minority Whips:
  - Domingo Torres García (PPD)
  - Adriana Gutiérrez Colón (PIP)

=== Non-member officers ===
The House is served by several officials who are not members.

The Senate's chief administrative officer is the Secretary of the House, who maintains public records, disburses salaries, monitors the acquisition of stationery and supplies, and oversees clerks. The Secretary automatically presides over the House in the interim, once the term of the incumbent Speaker is finished, but before the House elects a new Speaker.

Another official is the Sergeant-at-Arms of the House who maintains order and security on the Senate premises as the Senate's chief law enforcement officer.

This officers are elected by the Senate, usually during its inaugural session, immediately after the election of the body's. The current Secretary is Alberto León while the current Sergeant-At-Arms is William Estrada.

== Current composition ==
The current session is the 31st House of Representatives of Puerto Rico, the lower house of the 19th Legislative Assembly of Puerto Rico, which will meet from 2 January 2021, to 1 January 2025. Members were elected in the general elections of 2020 with a simple majority coming from the Popular Democratic Party (Puerto Rico) (PDP).

- District 1: Eddie Charbonier Chinea
- District 2: Luis Raúl Torres
- District 3: José Hernández Concepción
- District 4: Víctor Parés
- District 5: Jorge Navarro Suárez
- District 6: Ángel Morey Noble
- District 7: Luis Pérez Ortíz
- District 8: Yashira Lebrón Rodríguez
- District 9: Er Yazzer Morales Díaz
- District 10: Deborah Soto Arroyo
- District 11: Rafael "Tatito" Hernández
- District 12: Edgardo Feliciano Sánchez
- District 13: Gabriel Rodríguez Aguiló
- District 14: José O. González Mercado
- District 15: Joel I. Franqui Atiles
- District 16: Eladio J. Cardona Quiles
- District 17: Wilson Román López
- District 18: Jessie Cortés Ramos
- District 19: Jocelyne Rodríguez Negrón
- District 20: Kebin Maldonado Martínez
- District 21: Lydia Méndez Silva
- District 22: Jorge Alfredo Rivera Segarra
- District 23: José H. Rivera Madera
- District 24: Ángel A. Fourquet Cordero
- District 25: Domingo J. Torres García
- District 26: Orlando Aponte Rosario
- District 27: Estrella Martínez Soto
- District 28: Juan J. Santiago Nieves
- District 29: Gretchen Hau
- District 30: Luis «Narmito» Ortiz Lugo
- District 31: Roberto López Román
- District 32: José Manuel «Conny» Varela Fernández
- District 33: Ángel Peña Ramírez
- District 34: Ramón Luis Cruz Burgos
- District 35: Sol Y. Higgins Cuadrado
- District 36: Carlos "Johnny" Méndez
- District 37: Ángel Bulerín
- District 38: Wanda del Valle
- District 39: Roberto Rivera Ruiz
- District 40: Angel Matos García
- At-large: Héctor Ferrer Santiago
- At-large: Jesús Manuel Ortiz González
- At-large: José Aponte Hernández
- At-large: José Pichy Torres Zamora
- At-large: José "Quiquito" Meléndez
- At-large: «Che» Pérez Cordero
- At-large: María de Lourdes Ramos Rivera
- At-large: José Bernardo Márquez
- At-large: Mariana Nogales Molinelli
- At-large: Denis Márquez Lebrón
- At-large: Lisie J. Burgos Muñiz

== Other organizations ==
The Office of Legislative Services was headed in early 2009 by Kevin Rivera, while Eliezer Velázquez currently serves as Superintendent of the Capitol, the first to serve during two four-year terms.

The Puerto Rico Legislative Assembly also receives support services from the Council of State Governments (CSG), CSG's Eastern Regional Conference, the National Conference of State Legislatures (NCSL) and the National Hispanic Caucus of State Legislators (NHCSL).

== See also ==
- List of female members of the House of Representatives of Puerto Rico
