= Puerto Rico representative districts =

Electoral districts in which Puerto Rico is divided

The Puerto Rico representative districts (Spanish: distritos representativos) refers to the electoral districts in which Puerto Rico is divided for the purpose of electing 40 of the 51 members of the House of Representatives of Puerto Rico (with the other 11 being elected at-large). The island is currently divided into 40 representative districts, each based on a similar number of inhabitants, and comprising one or more precincts—an electoral division divided, in turn, into colleges (Spanish: colegios). A college usually is defined simply by the nearest public school to the voter's declared residence. American citizens (including Puerto Ricans) may vote only in the district in which they have declared their residence, and only for one candidate, for up to one member of the House per district by first-past-the-post. (As well, each voter may cast a vote for the election of an at-large member of the House of Representatives.)

== History ==
Districts are revised after every ten-year census. The last redistribution was done in 2022 using the new precincts drawn up using the 2020 census.

== Districts ==
District	Precincts	Population
1	San Juan 001	
2	San Juan 002	
3	San Juan 003	
4	San Juan 004	
5	San Juan 005; Guaynabo 006; Aguas Buenas 081	
6	Guaynabo 007; Cataño 008; Bayamón 041	
7	Bayamón 010	
8	Bayamón 011	
9	Bayamón 012; Toa Alta 013	
10	Cataño 009; Toa Baja 014	
11	Dorado 015; Vega Alta 016; Vega Baja 018	
12	Vega Alta 017; Vega Baja 019; Morovis 020; Manatí 021	
13	Manatí 022; Florida 024; Barceloneta 025; Arecibo 026	
14	Arecibo 027; Hatillo 028	
15	Hatillo 029; Camuy 030; Quebradillas 031	
16	Isabela 032; San Sebastián 033; Aguadilla 085	
17	Aguadilla 035; Moca 036	
18	Moca 037; Aguada 038; Rincón 039; Añasco 040	
19	Mayagüez 042; San Germán 043	
20	San Germán 044; Hormigueros 045; Cabo Rojo 046	
21	Las Marías 034; Lajas 047; Guánica 048; Sabana Grande 049; Maricao 050; Yauco 051	
22	Ciales 023; Lares 053; Utuado 054; Adjuntas 055; Jayuya 056	
23	Yauco 052; Guayanilla 058; Peñuelas 059; Ponce 060; Adjuntas 111	
24	Ponce 061	
25	Jayuya 057; Ponce 062; Juana Díaz 063	
26	Villalba 065; Orocovis 066; Coamo 068; Barranquitas 070; Corozal 112	
27	Juana Díaz 064; Santa Isabel 067; Aibonito 069; Coamo 075	
28	Barranquitas 071; Corozal 072; Naranjito 073; Comerío 074	
29	Cidra 076; Cayey 077	
30	Salinas 078; Guayama 079; Arroyo 080; Santa Isabel 113	
31	Caguas 082; Gurabo 084	
32	Caguas 083	
33	San Lorenzo 086; Juncos 088; Las Piedras 089; Gurabo 114	
34	San Lorenzo 087; Patillas 091; Maunabo 092; Yabucoa 093	
35	Las Piedras 090; Humacao 094; Naguabo 095	
36	Vieques 096; Culebra 097; Ceiba 098; Fajardo 099; Luquillo 100; Río Grande 101	
37	Río Grande 102; Loíza 103; Canóvanas 104	
38	Canóvanas 105; Carolina 106; Trujillo Alto 109	
39	Carolina 107; Trujillo Alto 110	
40	Carolina 108	

== See also ==
- Puerto Rico Senatorial districts
