= 2024 Puerto Rican municipal elections =

- November 5, 2024

All 78 municipalities
	Majority party	Minority party	Third party
Leader	Luis Hernández Ortiz (did not seek re-election)	Gabriel Hernández Rodríguez	Javier Jiménez Pérez (did not seek re-election)
Party	Popular Democratic	New Progressive	Project Dignity
Leader since	January 27, 2021	December 12, 2021	Octubre 2, 2023
Leader's seat	Villalba	Camuy	San Sebastián
Seats before	41	36	1
Seats after	45	33	0
Seat change	▲4	▼3	▼1

The 2024 Puerto Rican municipal election was held on November 5, 2024, to elect the mayors of the 78 municipalities of Puerto Rico, concurrently with the election of the Governor, Resident Commissioner, the Senate, and the House of Representatives, as well as the election events of a status referendum and a presidential straw poll. As candidates in the 2024 general elections, the winners were elected to serve a four-year term from January 2, 2025, to January 2, 2029.

== Results ==
The final results of the 2024 Puerto Rican municipal election were certified on December 31, 2024, by the Puerto Rico State Commission (CEE).

=== Adjuntas ===
2024 Adjuntas mayoral election
Candidate	Party
Obed D. Cintrón González	PNP
José H. Soto Rivera (Incumbent)	PPD
Alana T. Feldman Soler	MVC
Carlos A. Sanabria Plaza	PIP
Total

=== Aguada ===
2024 Aguada mayoral election
Candidate	Party
Wilbert Nieves Chaparro	PNP
Christian E. Cortés Feliciano (Incumbent)	PPD
Luis E. Agrot Sánchez	PIP
Edison Vega Mendoza	PD
Total

Wilbert Nieves Chaparro won the PNP primary.

=== Aguadilla ===
2024 Aguadilla mayoral election
Candidate	Party
Dennis Morales Rodríguez	PNP
Julio Roldán Concepción (Incumbent)	PPD
Nilda Burgos Declet	MVC
Héctor M. Rivera Viera	PIP
Benito Matos Morilo	PD
Total

Dennis Morales Rodríguez won the PNP primary.

=== Aguas Buenas ===
2024 Aguas Buenas mayoral election
Candidate	Party
Karina Nieves Serrano (Incumbent)	PNP
Carlos F. Pagán Carrión	PPD
José F. Córdova Iturregui	MVC
Omar D. Falcón Velázquez	PIP
Total

Previous PNP mayor Javier García Pérez was arrested on May 5, 2022, on accounts of conspiracy, bribery and extortion scheme. The next day, he would renounce to his post effective May 16. Later, on June 12, Karina Nieves Serrano won the special election to finish García Pérez's term. She was challenged by former mayor Carlos Aponte Silva in the PNP primary, but Nieves Serrano won the candidacy.

=== Aibonito ===
2024 Aibonito mayoral election
Candidate	Party or alliance	
William Alicea Pérez (Incumbent)	PNP	
Wanda D. Rolón Rodríguez	PPD	
Iván A. Alonso Costo	Alianza	PIP
Rafael Mercado Quiñones	PD	
Total

=== Añasco ===
2024 Añasco mayoral election
Candidate	Party
Kabir D. Solares García (Incumbent)	PNP
José R. González Montes de Oca	PPD
Carlos J. Medero Barbosa	MVC
Víctor M. Valentín Feliciano	PIP
Total

=== Arecibo ===
2024 Arecibo mayoral election
Candidate	Party
José O. González Mercado	PNP
Carlos R. Ramírez Irizarry (Incumbent)	PPD
Lauce E. Colón Pérez	MVC
Javier Biaggi Caballero	PIP
Luis E. del Río Morales	PD
Total

=== Arroyo ===
2024 Arroyo mayoral election
Candidate	Party
Evelyn Díaz Suárez	PNP
Eric E. Bachier Román (Incumbent)	PPD
Edra I. Díaz Santiago	PIP
Total

=== Barceloneta ===
2024 Barceloneta mayoral election
Candidate	Party
Cynthia I. Vidot Hernández	PNP
Wanda J. Soler Rosario (Incumbent)	PPD
Elvin Rivera Torres	PIP
Total

=== Barranquitas ===
2024 Barranquitas mayoral election
Candidate	Party
Elliot J. Colón Blanco (Incumbent)	PNP
Pablo D. Ortiz Feliciano	PPD
Edna I. Meléndez Berríos	PIP
Total

Incumbent mayor Elliot Colón Blanco won the PNP primary.

=== Bayamón ===
2024 Bayamón mayoral election
Candidate	Party
Ramón L. Rivera Cruz (Incumbent)	PNP
Morgan A. Cordero Calderón	PPD
Bryant O. Martínez Colón	MVC
David A. Ávila Concepción	PIP
Luis A. Scharon Cruz	PD
Total

=== Cabo Rojo ===
2024 Cabo Rojo mayoral election
Candidate	Party
Jorge A. Morales Wiscovitch (Incumbent)	PNP
Roberto J. Ramírez Kurtz	PPD
José E. García Morales	MVC
Francisco Arroyo Vélez	PIP
Pedro A. García Morales	PD
Sammy A. Lugo Seda	IND
Total

Roberto Ramírez Kurtz won the PPD primary.

=== Caguas ===
2024 Caguas mayoral election
Candidate	Party or alliance	
Roberto J. López Román	PNP	
William E. Miranda Torres (Incumbent)	PPD	
Jason L. Domenech Miller	Alianza	PIP
Dora E. Colón Almodóvar	PD	
Total

Roberto J. López Román won the PNP primary.

=== Camuy ===
2024 Camuy mayoral election
Candidate	Party
Gabriel Hernández Rodríguez (Incumbent)	PNP
Alejandro Hernández Ramos	PPD
Monserrate Méndez Ramos	PIP
Bernabé González Vázquez	PD
Total

=== Canóvanas ===
2024 Canóvanas mayoral election
Candidate	Party
Lornna J. Soto Villanueva (Incumbent)	PNP
Radziel J. Alicea Castillo	PPD
Reginald Smith Pizarro	MVC
Luz D. González Encarnación	PIP
Iris V. Soto Pérez	PD
José Meléndez Fraguada	IND
Total

=== Carolina ===
2024 Carolina mayoral election
Candidate	Party
Humberto F. Cobo Estrella	PNP
José C. Aponte Dalmau (Incumbent)	PPD
David A. Rodríguez Díaz	MVC
Joseph E. Dufrasne González	PIP
Yeimy Rivera Ureña	PD
Total

=== Cataño ===
2024 Cataño mayoral election
Candidate	Party
Julio Alicea Vasallo (Incumbent)	PNP
Norberto Torres Serrano	PPD
Armando González Ortiz	MVC
Yolanda Ortiz del Rosario	PIP
Ricardo Y. Rivera Vega	PD
Total

Previous PNP mayor Félix Delgado Montalvo renounced to his post on November 30, 2021, and later he declared himself guilty of a corruption charge for profiting from a scheme involving the companies Waste Collection and J.R Asphalt. Julio Alicea Vasallo was sworn in as mayor on December 19 after he was the only candidate in the mayoral race. Alicea Vasallo later won the PNP primary, while Norberto Torres Serrano won the PPD primary.

=== Cayey ===
2024 Cayey mayoral election
Candidate	Party
Héctor de Jesús Soto	PNP
Rolando Ortiz Velázquez (Incumbent)	PPD
José C. Rivera Santiago	MVC
Irving X. Santiago Rodríguez	PIP
William Aguilú Santiago	PD
Total

=== Ceiba ===
2024 Ceiba mayoral election
Candidate	Party
Samuel Rivera Báez (Incumbent)	PNP
Julio R. Arias Meléndez	PPD
Carlos E. Pino Pagán	PIP
Sonia Rivera Rosado	PD
Total

Incumbent mayor Samuel Rivera Báez won the PNP primary.

=== Ciales ===
2024 Ciales mayoral election
Candidate	Party
Alexander Burgos Otero (Incumbent)	PNP
Jesús W. Resto Rivera	PPD
Ana M. Villalobos Robles	PIP
Abimael Ayala Melecio	PD
Total

Incumbent mayor Alexander Burgos Otero won the PNP primary, while Jesús W. Resto Rivera won the PPD primary.

=== Cidra ===
2024 Cidra mayoral election
Candidate	Party
Delvis J. Pagán Clajivo	PNP
Ángel D. Concepción González (Incumbent)	PPD
José R. Cabello Torres	MVC
Ivelisse C. Vega González	PIP
Sheila Dávila Rodríguez	PD
Total

Incumbent mayor Ángel D. Concepción González won the PPD primary, while Delvis J. Pagán Clajivo won the PNP primary.

=== Coamo ===
2024 Coamo mayoral election
Candidate	Party or alliance	
Merlyn J. Rivera Zayas	PNP	
Juan C. García Padilla (Incumbent)	PPD	
Aníbal J. Díaz Santos	Alianza	PIP
Total

=== Comerío ===
2024 Comerío mayoral election
Candidate	Party
Dennis I. Agosto Vázquez	PNP
Irvin Rivera González	PPD
José D. Rodríguez Rivera	MVC
Germán G. González Bernúdez	PIP
Total

Incumbent mayor José A. Santiago Rivera announced on December 5, 2023, that he would not seek re-election, instead opting to run for at-large senator.

=== Corozal ===
2024 Corozal mayoral election
Candidate	Party
Luis A. García Rolón (Incumbent)	PNP
José A. Cruz Lugo	PPD
Andrés Miranda Rosario	PIP
Total

=== Culebra ===
2024 Culebra mayoral election
Candidate	Party
Edilberto Romero Llovet (Incumbent)	PNP
Carolyn Vizcarrondo Carrillo	PPD
Total

=== Dorado ===
2024 Dorado mayoral election
Candidate	Party or alliance	
Erik Y. Rolón Suárez	PNP	
Aníbal José Torres (Incumbent)	PPD	
Yamira Colón Prieto	Alianza	MVC
Total

Incumbent mayor Carlos A. López Rivera won the PPD primary.

Carlos A. López Rivera passed away on October 17, 2025. Aníbal José Torres (PPD) is now the Mayor.

=== Fajardo ===
2024 Fajardo mayoral election
Candidate	Party or alliance	
José A. Meléndez Méndez (Incumbent)	PNP	
Victor A. Figueroa Meléndez	PPD	
Antionio M. Prieto Colón	Alianza	PIP
Ana E. Figueroa Benítez	PD	
Total

=== Florida ===
2024 Florida mayoral election
Candidate	Party
José E. Gerena Polanco (Incumbent)	PNP
José A. Crespo Cortés	PPD
Miguel A. Cruz Pagán	PIP
Félix Claudio González	PD
Total

=== Guánica ===
2024 Guánica mayoral election
Candidate	Party
Carlos A. Vega Mercado	PNP
Ismael Rodríguez Ramos (Incumbent)	PPD
Aníbal Camacho Ortiz	PIP
Jasmine Negrón Otero	IND
Total

=== Guayama ===
2024 Guayama mayoral election
Candidate	Party
Glorimari Jaime Rodríguez	PNP
O’brian Vázquez Molina (Incumbent)	PPD
Juan A. Cotto Bristol	MVC
Ranffy Rivera Lebrón	PIP
Total

Previous PPD mayor Eduardo Cintrón Suárez renounced to his post on April 8, 2022, and later he declared himself guilty of federal crimes of for a bribery scheme in his government. Later, on May 7, O'brain Vázquez Molina won the special election to finish Cintrón Suárez's term.

=== Guayanilla ===
2024 Guayanilla mayoral election
Candidate	Party
Raúl Rivera Rodríguez (Incumbent)	PNP
Nelson L. Santiago Serrano	PPD
Luis A. Echevarría Cofresí	PIP
Total

Incumbent mayor Raúl Rivera Rodríguez won the PNP primary.

=== Guaynabo ===
2024 Guaynabo mayoral election
Candidate	Party
Eduard A. O’Niell Rosa (Incumbent)	PNP
Ernesto Cabrera Fuentes	PPD
Gladys M. Conty Hernández	MVC
Jaime Alonso Sánchez	PIP
Lisandra Mercado García	PD
Total

Previous PNP mayor Ángel Pérez Otero was arrested on December 9, 2021, on account of conspiracy, bribes with federal funds and kickbacks, and then resigned the next day. Later, on January 15, 2022, Edward O'Niell Rosa, son of previous mayor Héctor O'Neill García, won the controversial special election to finish Pérez Otero's term.

=== Gurabo ===
2024 Gurabo mayoral election
Candidate	Party
Rosachely Rivera Santana (Incumbent)	PNP
Noel Colón García	PPD
Héctor Rodríguez Delgado	PIP
Total

=== Hatillo ===
2024 Hatillo mayoral election
Candidate	Party
Manuel A. Orriola Pérez	PNP
Carlos E. Román Román (Incumbent)	PPD
Luis G. Collazo Torres	PIP
Edwin del Valle Ruíz	PD
Total

Previous PPD mayor José Rodríguez Cruz renounced to his post on March 23, 2022, after 22 years in the job. Later, on May 1, Carlos E. Román Román won the special election to finish Rodríguez Cruz's term. Román Román later won the PPD primary, while Manuel A. Orriola Pérez won the PNP primary.

=== Hormigueros ===
2024 Hormigueros mayoral election
Candidate	Party
José L. Acevedo Olivencia	PNP
Pedro J. García Figueroa (Incumbent)	PPD
Josué A. González López	PIP
Total

=== Humacao ===
2024 Humacao mayoral election
Candidate	Party or alliance	
Julio L. Géigel Pérez	PNP	
Rosamar Trujillo Plumey	PPD	
Ana E. Ponce Rosa	Alianza	MVC
Efrén Torres Delgado	PD	
Total

Previous PNP mayor Reinaldo Vargas Rodríguez was arrested on May 5, 2022, on accounts of conspiracy, bribery and extortion scheme. On May 7, he renounced to his post effective May 16. Later, on June 12, Julio Geigel Pérez won the special election to finish Vargas Rodríguez's term.

=== Isabela ===
2024 Isabela mayoral election
Candidate	Party
Carlos J. Tavarez Santiago	PNP
Miguel E. Méndez Pérez (Incumbent)	PPD
Martina Medina Cortés	MVC
Bitia Plumey Banuchi	PIP
Wanda Maldonado Vega	PD
Total

Carlos J. Tavárez Santiago won the PNP primary.

=== Jayuya ===
2024 Jayuya mayoral election
Candidate	Party
Ricardo Figueroa Pérez	PNP
Jorge L. González Otero (Incumbent)	PPD
Félix González Mercado	PIP
Total

=== Juana Díaz ===
2024 Juana Díaz mayoral election
Candidate	Party
Justo L. González Torres	PNP
Ramón Hernández Torres (Incumbent)	PPD
Juan R. Rosario Ramos	PIP
Total

=== Juncos ===
2024 Juncos mayoral election
Candidate	Party
William Serrano Serrano	PNP
Alfredo Alejandro Carríon (Incumbent)	PPD
Ricardo R. Quiles Rodríguez	PIP
Wanda L. Arzuaga López	PD
Total

Incumbent mayor Alfredo Alejandro Carrión won the PPD primary, while William Serrano Serrano won the PNP primary.

=== Lajas ===
2024 Lajas mayoral election
Candidate	Party
Jayson I. Martínez Maldonado (Incumbent)	PNP
Alcides Martínez Martínez	PPD
Jaimon Camacho Román	PIP
César Corales Cotty	PD
Total

Alcides Martínez Valentín won the PPD primary.

=== Lares ===
2024 Lares mayoral election
Candidate	Party
Michael A. Quiñones Irizarry	PNP
Fabían Arroyo Rodríguez (Incumbent)	PPD
Jeidy C. Román Irizarry	PIP
Total

Michael A. Quiñones Irizarry won the PNP primary.

=== Las Marías ===
2024 Las Marías mayoral election
Candidate	Party or alliance	
Edwin Soto Santiago (Incumbent)	PNP	
José S. Rodríguez Cuevas	PPD	
Pedro I. Parrilla Rodríguez	Alianza	PIP
Total

=== Las Piedras ===
2024 Las Piedras mayoral election
Candidate	Party
Miguel A. López Rivera (Incumbent)	PNP
Moisés Castro Perales	PPD
Verónica Custodio Maysonet	MVC
Pablo D. Martínez Pérez	PIP
Nilka Rodríguez García	PD
Total

=== Loíza ===
2024 Loiza mayoral election
Candidate	Party
Jhondee N. Canales Lora	PNP
Julia M. Nazario Fuentes (Incumbent)	PPD
Aquila Lebrón Ríos	PIP
Total

Jhondee N. Canales Lora won the PNP primary.

=== Luquillo ===
2024 Luquillo mayoral election
Candidate	Party
Julio S. Meléndez Román	PNP
Jesús G. Márquez Rodríguez (Incumbent)	PPD
Ángel M. Rosado Fenández	MVC
José R. González Velázquez	PIP
José R. Rivera Rivera	PD
Total

Julio S. Menéndez Román won the PNP primary.

=== Manatí ===
2024 Manatí mayoral election
Candidate	Party
José A. Sánchez González (Incumbent)	PNP
Christian R. Marrero Ortega	PPD
Eric Martínez Martínez	PIP
Total

=== Maricao ===
2024 Maricao mayoral election
Candidate	Party
Gilberto Pérez Valentín	PNP
Wilfredo Ruíz Feliciano (Incumbent)	PPD
Melanie Oms Castillo	PIP
Ferdinand Pérez Rodríguez	PD
Eugenio Vázquez Galarza	IND
Total

=== Maunabo ===
2024 Maunabo mayoral election
Candidate	Party
Ángel O. Lafuente Amaro (Incumbent)	PNP
Jorge L. Márquez Pérez	PPD
Nelson Vázquez Rodríguez	PIP
Total

=== Mayagüez ===
2024 Mayagüez mayoral election
Candidate	Party
Evelyn L. Vázquez Nieves	PNP
Jorge L. Ramos Ruíz (Incumbent)	PPD
Jaime A. Viqueira Mariani	MVC
Orlando Ruíz Pesante	PIP
John E. Pérez Vargas	PD
Total

Incumbent mayor José G. Rodríguez Rodríguez was accused on March 31, 2022, of embezzlement of public funds, being suspended from his position the next day. Jorge L. Ramos Ruiz became the interim mayor. Later, on June 1, they found cause for arrest against Rodríguez Rodríguez. There was supposed to be a preliminary hearing, but it kept being posponed, until August 15, 2023. Later on November 3, it was determined that there was sufficient probable cause to go to trial. Ramos Ruiz later won the PPD primary, while Evelyn Vázquez Nieves won the PNP primary.

=== Moca ===
2024 Moca mayoral election
Candidate	Party
Ángel A. Pérez Rodríguez (Incumbent)	PNP
Efraín Barrero Barreto	PPD
Carlos J. Hernández Seguí	PIP
Melvin Lorenzo Lorenzo	PD
Total

Incumbent mayor Ángel A. Pérez Rodríguez won the PNP primary.

=== Morovis ===
2024 Morovis mayoral election
Candidate	Party
Olvin A. Santiago Díaz	PNP
Carmen I. Maldonado González (Incumbent)	PPD
José I. Sánchez Hernández	PIP
Total

Incumbent mayor Carmen Maldonado González announced on October 17, 2022, that she would not seek re-election, instead opting to run for governor. Later on January 18, 2023, she announced that she would be running for president of the PPD. On May 7, after coming last on the PPD presidency election, she conceded and announced that she would instead be running for re-election. Olvin A. Santiago Díaz won the PNP primary.

=== Naguabo ===
2024 Naguabo mayoral election
Candidate	Party
Harry Ocacio Henríguez	PNP
Miraidaliz Rosario Pagán (Incumbent)	PPD
Alexeis Quiñones Scott	PIP
Noel Prado Márquez	PD
Total

Incumbent mayor Miraidaliz Rosario Pagán won the PPD primary, while Harry Ocacio Henríquez won the PNP primary.

=== Naranjito ===
2024 Naranjito mayoral election
Candidate	Party
Orlando Ortiz Chevres (Incumbent)	PNP
Julián J. Crespo López	PPD
Ariel Rolón López	PIP
Total

=== Orocovis ===
2024 Orocovis mayoral election
Candidate	Party
Jesús E. Colón Berlingieri (Incumbent)	PNP
Yesenia D. López Rosario	PPD
José R. Díaz García	MVC
Cecilio Díaz Serra	PIP
Total

=== Patillas ===
2024 Patillas mayoral election
Candidate	Party
Maritza Sánchez Neris (Incumbent)	PNP
Reinaldo Rivera Ortiz	PPD
Ramfis Soto Westerband	PIP
Total

=== Peñuelas ===
2024 Peñuelas mayoral election
Candidate	Party
Josean González Febres	PNP
Gregory Gonsález Souchet (Incumbent)	PPD
Elvin E. Lugo Rodríguez	PIP
Noemí Ramos Cruz	PD
Ricardo Irizarry Vázquez	IND
Total

Incumbent mayor Gregory Gonsález Souchet won the PPD primary.

=== Ponce ===
2024 Ponce mayoral election
Candidate	Party
Pablo Colón Santiago	PNP
Marlese Sifre Rodríguez (Incumbent)	PPD
Javier L. Bonnín Orozco	MVC
José V. Madera Caban	PIP
Rafael González Pratts	PD
Total

Incumbent mayor Luis Irizarry Pabón was accused on November 1, 2023, of corruption, using his position for personal gains, being suspended from his position the next day. Nonetheless, Irizarry Pabón announced that he would run for reelection, which the PPD allowed with the caveat that he would step down from the race if the result of the preliminary hearing proved there was sufficient probable cause. Nonetheless, when February 28, 2024 came, Irizarry Pabón did no step down, stating that he was innocent, and the PPD threatened to take him to court. Later, on April 28, Irizarry Pabón officially stepped down, after it was determined that there was sufficient probable cause to go to trial. After this, the PPD chose interim mayor Marlese Sifre Rodríguez as their candidate during their convention, while the PNP chose Pablo Colón Santiago during the primaries.

=== Quebradillas ===
2024 Quebradillas mayoral election
Candidate	Party
Jerón Muñiz Lassalle	PNP
Heríberto Vélez Vélez (Incumbent)	PPD
Ramses Ocasio Jiménez	MVC
René Román Iglesias	PIP
Luis R. Quijano López	PD
Total

Incumbent mayor Heriberto Vélez Vélez won the PPD primary.

=== Rincón ===
2024 Rincón mayoral election
Candidate	Party
David Bonilla Cortés	PNP
Carlos D. López Bonilla (Incumbent)	PPD
Rolando Awuino Carrero	MVC
Alexis O. Silva Bonet	PIP
Total

Incumbent mayor Carlos D. López Bonilla won the PPD primary.

=== Río Grande ===
2024 Río Grande mayoral election
Candidate	Party
Pablo Ramos Rivera	PNP
Ángel B. González Damudt (Incumbent)	PPD
Nomar López Sánchez	MVC
Rafael Figueroa Cartagena	PIP
José C. Hernández González	PD
Total

=== Sabana Grande ===
2024 Sabana Grande mayoral election
Candidate	Party
Alex López Rodríguez	PNP
Marcos G. Valentn Flores (Incumbent)	PPD
José R. Ortiz Lugo	PIP
Total

Incumbent mayor Marcos G. Valentn Flores won the PPD primary.

=== Salinas ===
2024 Salinas mayoral election
Candidate	Party
Joshua Rivera Carrasquillo	PNP
Karilyn Bonilla Colón (Incumbent)	PPD
Wanda J. Ríos Colorado	MVC
Litzy Alvarado Atonetty	PIP
Edwin Santiago Domínguez	PD
Total

Joshua Rivera Carrasquillo won the PNP primary.

=== San Germán ===
2024 San Germán mayoral election
Candidate	Party
Virgilio Oliveras Oliveras (Incumbent)	PNP
Jorge A. Ramos Vélez	PPD
Geraldo Acosta Hernández †	MVC
Joel Vega Torres	PIP
Luis Vega González	PD
Total

Incumbent mayor Virgilio Olivera Olivera won the PNP primary, while Jorge A. Ramos Vélez won the PPD primary. On September 28, 2024, municipal legislator and MVC candidate Geraldo Acosta Hernández died, who had been fighting cancer during his campaign. His name will remain on the ballot, as these were already being printed.

=== San Juan ===
2024 San Juan mayoral election
Candidate	Party	Votes	%	+/–
Miguel A. Romero Lugo (Incumbent)	PNP	56,337	46.74	+10.14
Manuel A. Natal Albelo	MVC	48,719	40.42	+6.55
Terestella González Denton	PPD	12,728	10.56	–12.66
Maidaliz Irizarry Villegas	PD	2,454	2.04	–1.99
José F. Vargas Cruz	IND	297	0.25	–3.03
Total		120,535	100.00	–

Incumbent Mayor Miguel Romero of the PNP won reelection in a repeat contest against MVC candidate Manuel Natal. Both candidates improved significantly on their 2020 results, at the expense of candidates from the PPD and PD.

=== San Lorenzo ===
2024 San Lorenzo mayoral election
Candidate	Party
Jaime Alverio Ramos (Incumbent)	PNP
John Dávila Andino	PPD
Edgar J. Crespo del Toro	MVC
Carlos Izquierdo Cáez	PIP
Total

John Dávila Andino won the PPD primary.

=== San Sebastián ===
2024 San Sebastián mayoral election
Candidate	Party
Justo Medina Esteves	PNP
Eladio J. Cardona Quiles	PPD
Jasiel Carril Jímenez	MVC
Manuel Acevedo Serrano	PIP
Camilo Ortiz Maldonado	PD
Total

Incumbent mayor Javier Jiménez Pérez announced on September 25, 2023, that he was leaving the PNP because the party had abandoned its roots. Later, on October 2, he affiliated with Project Dignity, becoming the first mayor of this party. Two days later he announced that he would not seek re-election, instead opting to run for governor. The vice mayor Camilo Ortiz Maldonado also left the PNP, choosing to run for mayor under PD.

=== Santa Isabel ===
2024 Santa Isabel mayoral election
Candidate	Party
Meldwin Rivera Rodríguez	PNP
Rafael J. Burgos Santiago (Incumbent)	PPD
Ángel F. Candelario Caliz	PIP
Total

Incumbent mayor Rafael J. Burgos Santiago won the PPD primary, while Meldwin Rivera Rodríguez won the PNP primary.

=== Toa Alta ===
2024 Toa Alta mayoral election
Candidate	Party
Héctor J. Collazo Ayala	PNP
Clemente Agosto Lugardo (Incumbent)	PPD
Josué González Pérez	MVC
Iván A. Sánchez Almodóvar	PIP
Moisés Collazo Torres	PD
Total

Héctor J. Collazo Ayala won the PNP primary.

=== Toa Baja ===
2024 Toa Baja mayoral election
Candidate	Party
Bernando Márquez García (Incumbent)	PNP
Pedro J. Irene Maymí	PPD
Dario W. Ortiz Seda	PIP
Daniel Rodriguez Cabrera	PD
Total

=== Trujillo Alto ===
2024 Trujillo Alto mayoral election
Candidate	Party
Eric Correa Rivera	PNP
Pedro A. Rodríguez González (Incumbent)	PPD
Manuel Alonso López	MVC
Nellie Zambrana Ortiz	PIP
Kemuel Cruz Galarza	PD
Total

Previous PPD mayor José Cruz Cruz renounced to his post on June 17, 2022, after months of silence from his part since the announcement that the FBI was investigating him. Later, on July 16, former senator and representative Pedro Rodríguez González won the special election to finish Cruz Cruz's term.

=== Utuado ===
2024 Utuado mayoral election
Candidate	Party
Jorge A. Pérez Heredia (Incumbent)	PNP
Rafael A. Juarbe Pagán	PPD
Maritza Feliciano Jordán	MVC
Ramón Cruz Martínez	PIP
David Irizarry González	PD
Total

Rafael A. Juarbe Pagán won the PPD primary.

=== Vega Alta ===
2024 Vega Alta mayoral election
Candidate	Party
María M. Vega Pagán (Incumbent)	PNP
Brenda L. Rubio Mena	PPD
José A. González Torres	MVC
Luis F. Mercado Rosario	PIP
Héctor L. Zambrana Santos	PD
Total

=== Vega Baja ===
2024 Vega Baja mayoral election
Candidate	Party
Evelyn M. Meléndez Marrero	PNP
Marcos Cruz Molina (Incumbent)	PPD
Edwin Marrero Santiago	MVC
Rolando Rivera Garratón	PIP
Salvador García Rivera	PD
Total

Incumbent mayor Marcos Cruz Molina won the PPD primary, while Evelyn M. Meléndez Marrero won the PNP primary.

=== Vieques ===
2024 Vieques mayoral election
Candidate	Party or alliance	
José A. Corcino Acevedo (Incumbent)	PNP	
Emir T. Mercado Martínez	PPD	
Pamela González Robinson	Alianza	MVC
Iliannexis Pereida Padro	PD	
Yashei Rosario Centeno	IND	
Total

Emir T. Mercado Martínez won the PPD primary.

=== Villalba ===
2024 Villalba mayoral election
Candidate	Party or alliance	
Danny A. Santiago Núñez	PNP	
Wilfredo Santos Colón	PPD	
Héctor L. Rosarío Molina	Alianza	MVC
Total

On February 8, 2023, incumbent mayor Luis Hernández Ortiz announced that he would be running for president of the =PPD. On May 7, Hernández Ortiz and representative Jesús Ortiz González declared themselves the winner of the party presidential election. After four days of recounting the ballots, it was confirmed that Hernández Ortiz had lost the election. Later, on October 30, Hernández Ortiz announced that he would be running for a at-large seat in the senate. Wilfredo Santos Colón, won the PPD primary, while Danny A. Santiago Núñez won the PNP primary.

=== Yabucoa ===
2024 Yabucoa mayoral election
Candidate	Party
Yesenia Feliciano Camacho	PNP
Rafael Surillo Ruíz (Incumbent)	PPD
Dwayne O. Morales Arroyo	MVC
Daniel Cruz Donato	PIP
Total

Yesenia Feliciano Camacho won the PNP primary.

=== Yauco ===
2024 Yauco mayoral election
Candidate	Party
Ángel L. Torres Ortíz (Incumbent)	PNP
Alex García Quiñones	PPD
Miguel Fernandini Torres	MVC
Ervin Acevedo Delgado	PIP
Total

Incumbent mayor Ángel L. Torres Ortíz won the PNP primary.
