= Alianza de País =

Political party in Puerto Rico

Country Alliance Alianza de País
- Leader: Juan Dalmau
- Candidate for resident commissioner: Ana Irma Rivera Lassén
- Candidate for governor: Juan Dalmau
- Candidate for San Juan mayor: Manuel Natal Albelo
- Founded: January 23, 2023; 3 years ago
- Legalised: 2024
- Merger of: Puerto Rican Independence Party and Movimiento Victoria Ciudadana
- Ideology: Puerto Rican independence Left-wing nationalism Progressivism; Democratic socialism Anti-neoliberalism; Anti-colonialism; Social democracy
- Political position: Centre-left to left-wing
- Colors: Yellow; Black; Green
- Seats in the Senate: 2 / 27
- Seats in the House of Representatives: 3 / 51
- Municipalities: 0 / 78

Election symbol

Country Alliance (Spanish: Alianza de País) is an electoral alliance in Puerto Rico for the 2024 Puerto Rican general election composed by two progressive parties in Puerto Rico, the pro-independence Puerto Rican Independence Party (PIP) and the Movimiento Victoria Ciudadana (MVC) which is a politically progressive party composed of differing ideologies with respect to Puerto Rico's status.

== Background ==
In the 2016 gubernatorial election, the independent candidate Alexandra Lúgaro managed to arrive in third with 11.13%, María de Lourdes Santiago of the Puerto Rican Independence Party (PIP) and Rafael Bernabe from the Working People's Party (PPT) failed to reach the 3% threshold required to remain registered with 2.13% and 0.34% respectively. It was the first time since 1964 that one of the two main parties got less than 40%, when the pro-statehood PNP was still known as Partido Estadista Republicano and the first time since 1968 a third-party candidate got more than 10% of the vote.

In the 2020 gubernatorial election, Alexandra Lúgaro, this time for the newly-formed Movimiento Victoria Ciudadana (MVC), reached 13.95% and PIP-candidate Juan Dalmau reached 13.58%, combined they got just 4.2% less than Carlos Delgado Altieri of the PPD and 5.7% less than Pedro Pierluisi of the PNP.

The electoral law of Puerto Rico bans electoral fusion thus PIP runs Roberto Velázquez as Resident Commissioner candidate and MVC runs Javier Córdova Iturregui as gubernatorial candidate who function as paper candidates.

== Legislative results ==
Party	Leader	Ideology	Position	Senators 2025-29	Representatives 2025-29
Citizens' Victory Movement (MVC)	Ana Irma Rivera Lassén	Progressivism; Anti-colonialism; Anti-neoliberalism; Social democracy	Left-wing	0 / 27	0 / 51
Puerto Rican Independence Party (PIP)	Rubén Berríos	Social democracy Puerto Rican independence	Centre-left	2 / 27	3 / 51

== Election results ==
=== Governor Election Results ===
Year	Candidate	Votes	-/+	Result
2024	Juan Dalmau (PIP)	364,145	32.78%	Not elected

=== Resident Commissioner Election Results ===
Year	Candidate	Votes	-/+	Result
2024	Ana Irma Rivera Lassén (MVC)	106,025	10%	Not elected

=== San Juan Mayoral Election Results ===
Year	Candidate	Votes	-/+	Result
2024	Manuel Natal Albelo (MVC)	45.836	41.2%	Not elected
