= CARES Act-related frauds in Puerto Rico =

Welfare benefit fraud scandals in Puerto Rico

- Puerto Rico Department of Labor and Human Resources
- Date: 3 July 2020 (age 6)
- Duration: Ongoing
- Location: Puerto Rico
- Type: Welfare fraud
- Target: Puerto Rico Department of Labor and Human Resources

CARES Act-related frauds in Puerto Rico was a series of several financial fraud scandals related to the payment of benefits from the Pandemic Unemployment Assistance (PUA) program from the CARES Act in Puerto Rico during 2020. The most notable of these schemes, involved several employees from the Department of Labor of Puerto Rico receiving unemployment checks while still working.

== Background ==
During the COVID-19 Pandemic in Puerto Rico, the United States passed the Coronavirus Aid, Relief, and Economic Security Act (CARES), which included a broad unemployment benefits program, the Pandemic Unemployment Assistance (PUA), for any individual who was out of work due to the pandemic. In Puerto Rico, the funds are managed by the Puerto Rico Department of Labor and Human Resources (DTRH, for its initials in Spanish), who hired Evertec Group LLC, a joint-subsidiary of Popular, Inc. and Apollo Management to manage not only PUA requests, but other requests for funds from the CARES Act. The platform had been faulty since reports were made in April, were the platform had become "glitchy" to users, who were unable to complete the forms.

In early June, it was revealed that the platform was mailing many checks to an address marked as La Misma ("the same", in Spanish), since many applicants receive mail at their home address and would indicate this by writing "la misma" in the enclosed space for the mailing address. While the platform is automated for applicants, employees of the DTRH also input the data they receive from applicants who applied physically into the system, which printed and mailed thousands of undeliverable checks. This was only discovered when a United States Postal Service worker reported it on social media. This all forced then Secretary of Labor, Briseida Torres Reyes to resign her post. Her replacement, Carlos Rivera Santiago, had announced on 3 July that the United States Department of Justice Office of the Inspector General were verifying and auditing the PUA transactions and the Puerto Rico Department of Treasury would verify if the recipients had in fact filed Income Tax Returns as self-employed.

The DTRH established that it would be only involved in the recovery of the funds and that both local and federal authorities would be involved in filing criminal charges. Initially, the merchant registration certification was not required, but later it was as government and businesses reopened. On 29 July, Rivera Santiago revealed that the Department is working on a new, much more efficient platform that would pay out money through direct deposit, requiring the applicant to input their route and account numbers and the deposit would be made in a period of 72 hours.

Breakdown of PUA and Unemployment applications (15 March–24 July)
Benefits Program	Approved	Do not qualify	Controversial points (Note: Applicant is missing some information or document to determine if they are eligible or not.)	Total applications
Unemployment	208,749	90,172	58,202	333,288
PUA	263,117	90,172	58,202	307,051
Total	471,866	90,172	58,202	640,339

== Other fraud schemes ==
=== Identity Theft ===
Up until 16 July 2020, the Bank Robbery and Banking Institutions Fraud Division of the Criminal Investigations Auxiliary Superintendency (SAIC) of the Puerto Rico Police had arrested 10 individuals for stealing the identities of other individuals and using false identifications to cash the checks they received in the victims' names. Two additional arrests were made the day after in a bank in Vega Alta, at which they were trying to cash a total of $9,390. Up until the 24 July, 7 of the 18 complaints filed were related to identity theft. On 3 August, at a Popular, Inc. branch in San Patricio Plaza in Guaynabo, a 27-year-old man was arrested for attempting to cash a check for $10,722.

=== False Statements and Misinformation ===
During late July 2020, inspectors from the United States Postal Service alerted the Puerto Rico Department of Labor and Human Resources that various checks were arriving addresses to abandoned houses. Some of these had received more than 20 checks. The investigations revealed that some drug addicts were providing their name, Social Security number and address, but were not obligated to provide evidence of unemployment. The perpetrators would be on the lookout for the mail delivery and then pick the check and later cash them at the bank with documents that corroborated their identity. It was later revealed by the director of the SAIC, Lt. José Ayala, that he was after a criminal organization that used homeless people, both Puerto Ricans and foreigners, to do this. On July 23, three men were arrested for using false identities in Bayamón and Carolina. Up until the 24 July, 11 of the complaints filed were related to false statements.

On 25 July the Office of the Inspector General of the Government of Puerto Rico referred to the federal authorities the case of an individual who had received more than $30,000 in less than 45 days by keeping their own name and address the same and using various Social Security Numbers. On the same day three individuals were arrested in Dorado, Bayamón and San Juan with a sum of approximately $20,000. Two men, one in San Juan and the other in Toa Baja, were arrested for attempting to cash checks using false driver's licences. On 4 August, a man was arrested at a Popular, Inc. branch in the Los Colobos Shopping Center in Carolina when he was caught using a false driver's license to cash a $3,950 check.

== Results ==
Up until 24 July, the Puerto Rico Police had recovered $133,252. This figure had grown to $153,000 pertaining to 29 individuals arrested between 14 and 26 July. However, none of the people arrested were able to appear before a judge by the latter date, since the prosecutor had to wait for documents from both the DTRH and Evertec. Between 14 July and 3 August, the SAIC had recovered $183,280. By the next day the total amount had ascended to $187,230.

== See also ==
- Welfare fraud
