= 2020 San Juan, Puerto Rico, mayoral election =

- November 3, 2020
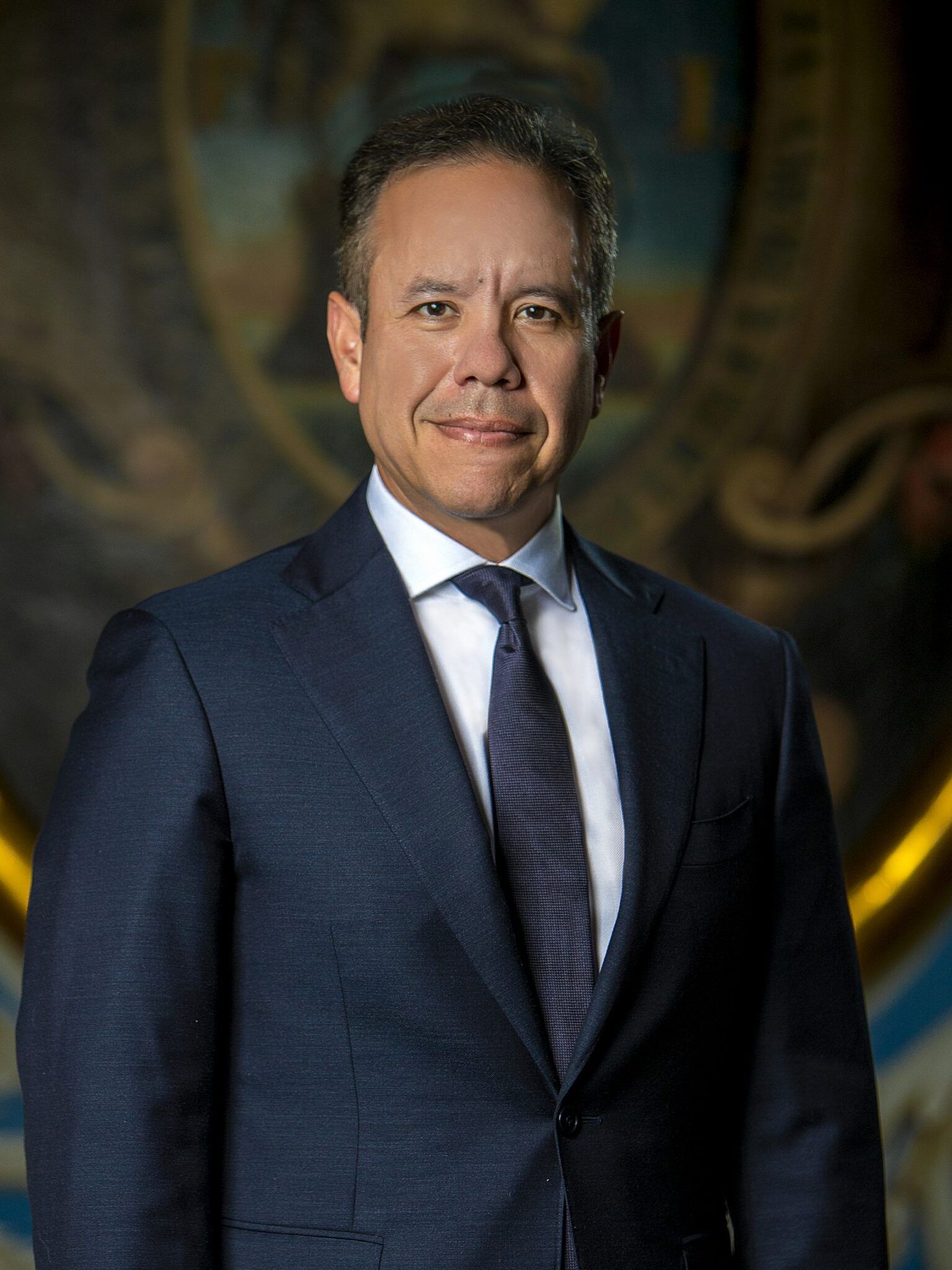

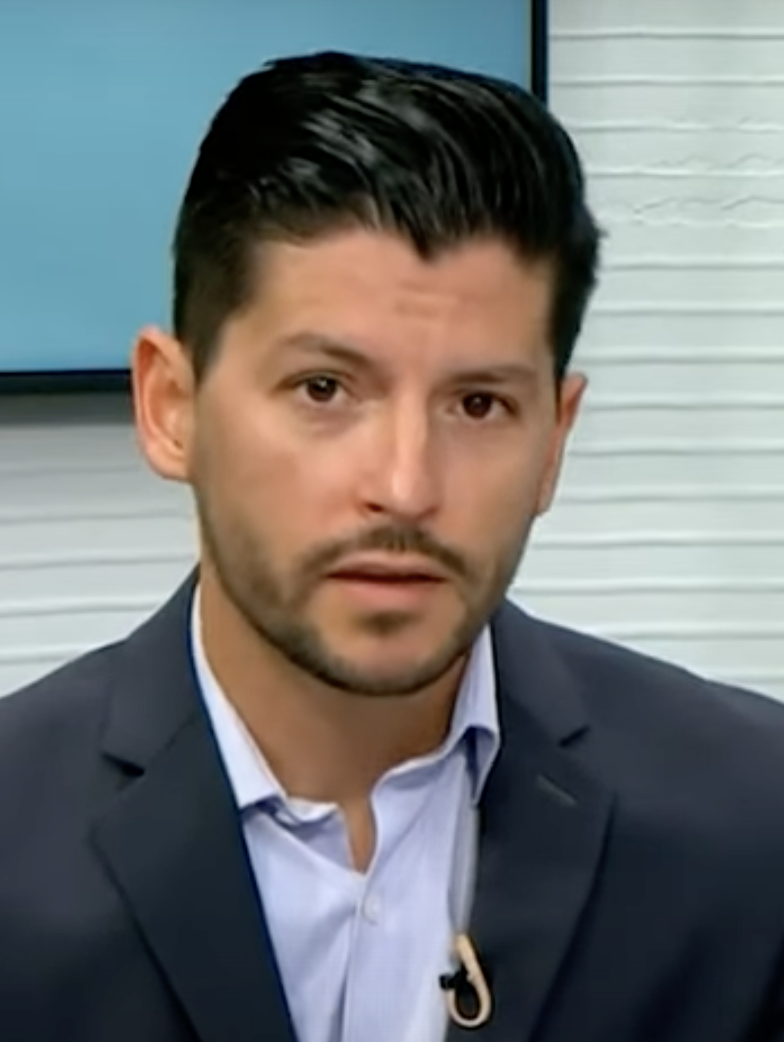

Nominee	Miguel Romero	Manuel Natal Albelo	Rossana López León
Party	New Progressive	Citizens' Victory	Popular Democratic
Popular vote	46,427	42,962	29,451
Percentage	36.60%	33.87%	23.22%
Mayor before election
Carmen Yulín Cruz
Popular Democratic
Elected mayor
Miguel Romero
New Progressive

San Juan, Puerto Rico, held an election for mayor on November 3, 2020. Among other elections, it was held concurrently with the 2020 Puerto Rico general election. It saw the election of New Progressive Party nominee Miguel Romero.

Incumbent mayor Carmen Yulín Cruz, a member of the Popular Democratic Party did not seek reelection to a third term, and instead ran an unsuccessful campaign for her party's nomination in the gubernatorial election.

== Nominations ==
=== New Progressive Party primary ===
The New Progressive Party held their party's primary election on August 9, nominating Miguel Romero (a district member of the Senate of Puerto Rico) over Manuel Colón.

New Progressive Party primary results
Party	Candidate	Votes	%
New Progressive	Miguel Romero	20,549	76.24
New Progressive	Mauel "Palomo" Colón	6,406	23.77
Total votes		26,955	100

=== Popular Democratic Party ===
The Popular Democracy Party cancelled its party primary election. It nominated Rossana López León, an at-large member of the Senate of Puerto Rico, without holding a primary.

=== Project Dignity ===
Project Dignity nominated Nelson Rosario Rodríguez.

=== Citizen's Victory Movement ===
Citizen's Victory Movement nominated Manuel Natal Albelo, an at-large member of the Puerto Rico House of Representatives.

=== Puerto Rican Independence Party ===
The Puerto Rican Independence Party nominated Adrián González Costa.

== General ==
=== Polls ===
Poll source	Date(s) administered	Sample size (Note: Key: A – all adults RV – registered voters LV – likely voters V – unclear)	Margin of error	Rossana Lopez (PPD)	Miguel Romero (PNP)	Manuel Natal (MVC)	Adrian Gonzalez (PIP)	Nelson Rosario (PD)	Other	Undecided
Beacon Research/Puerto Rico Herald	October 13–15, 2020	258 (RV)	–	26%	37%	10%	2%	1%	2% (Note: "Someone else" with 2%)	23% (Note: Includes "Refused")
Gaither International/El Vocero	October 1–7, 2020	500 (V)	± 4%	17%	38%	18%	2%	1%	–	24%

=== Results ===
San Juan mayoral election
Party	Candidate	Votes	%
New Progressive	Miguel Romero	46,427	36.60
Citizens' Victory	Manuel Natal Albelo	42,962	33.87
Popular Democratic	Rossana López León	29,451	23.22
Independence	Adrián González Costa	4,157	3.28
Project Dignity	Nelson Rosario Rodríguez	3,848	3.03
Total votes		126,845	100

=== Litigation ===
Manuel Natal Albelo launched a legal challenge demanding that a new election be held for the municipality's 77th Unit, which groups together several forms of absentee-voting and mail-in ballots. In his litigation, he alleged widespread irregularities during the counting process and leading to the election. The lawsuit was dismissed by a judge in January 2021 due to a total lack of evidence supporting the claim.

== See also ==
- 2020 Puerto Rican general election
