= Ruy Delgado Zayas =

Puerto Rican politician and attorney

Ruy N. Delgado Zayas is a Puerto Rican attorney and former public official who served as the Secretary of Labor and Human Resources of Puerto Rico from 1988 to 1993. He is known for his contributions to labor law, public policy, and legal commentary in Puerto Rico.

== Education ==
Delgado Zayas earned a Bachelor of Business Administration (B.B.A.) in Business from the University of Puerto Rico, and a Juris Doctor (J.D. from the Pontifical Catholic University of Puerto Rico School of Law.

== Public Service ==
Delgado Zayas began working at the Puerto Rico Department of Labor and Human Resources in 1970. Over the next 24 years, he held multiple legal and advisory positions within the department, eventually becoming Secretary.

=== Secretary of Labor and Human Resources (1988–1993) ===
Delgado Zayas was appointed Secretary in January 1988 by Governor Rafael Hernández Colón and served until December 1993, continuing briefly into the term of Governor Pedro Rosselló. As Secretary, he oversaw programs related to workforce development, labor rights, and unemployment benefits. He issued Opinion 90‑6 in 1990, reinforcing workplace harassment protections under Puerto Rican labor law.

In December 1992, he signed a contract with the Employee‑Owned Corporations Promotion Corporation (Fomento de Corporaciones de Trabajadores), which was later audited and cited for legal inconsistencies by the Office of the Comptroller.

== Legal practice and later work ==
After leaving office, Delgado Zayas founded the law firm Bufete Ruy Delgado Zayas in January 1993, where he specializes in labor and employment law. Delgado Zayas is a member of the Puerto Rican social fraternity Phi Sigma Alpha, where he has held leadership roles within the Alpha‑Boriquén alumni chapter.

== Public commentary ==
Delgado Zayas is a regular contributor to *El Nuevo Día*, writing opinion columns on a range of labor issues:

- *El dilema sobre el aumento al salario mínimo de Puerto Rico* (1 July 2024), in which he discussed the implications of the automatic increase to US$10.50 per hour and compliance with Law 47‑2021.
- *Reclamaciones viables ante el impago del bono navideño* (12 December 2023), outlining employees’ rights to file claims through the Department of Labor for unpaid bonuses.
- *El rechazo al aumento salarial para personal exento en Puerto Rico* (10 November 2023), commenting on the challenges of competitive compensation and retention of exempt employees.

He also participates in academic and public policy forums, including those hosted by the Pontifical Catholic University of Puerto Rico, addressing labor reform, post-pandemic employment trends, and decent work standards.
