= Angel González Román =

Puerto Rican judge

Dean of Pontifical Catholic University of Puerto Rico School of Law
- In office 2004–2013
- Preceded by: Charles Cuprill Oppenheimer
- Succeeded by: José A. Frontera Agenjo

Judge of the Puerto Rico Court of Appeals
- In office 1992–2001
- Nominated by: Rafael Hernández Colón

Personal details
- Born: San Sebastián, Puerto Rico
- Education: University of Puerto Rico (BBA); Interamerican University of Puerto Rico School of Law (JD)

Angel González-Román born in San Sebastián, Puerto Rico is a Puerto Rican jurist who served as Dean of the Pontifical Catholic University of Puerto Rico School of Law in Ponce, Puerto Rico.

Earned a Bachelor in Business Administration from the University of Puerto Rico and in 1968 he received a Juris Doctor degree at the Interamerican University of Puerto Rico School of Law.

Dean González-Román was appointed by Governor Rafael Hernández Colón, first as a Superior Court judge and, subsequently, as an appellate judge. After finishing his term from the bench, he was chosen as Dean of one of Puerto Rico's four law schools.

Worked was in the highway authority since 1969, where he served as Legal office Director. Since 1974 he worked as a property registrar, where he served for 13 years and served as internal administrative Director. In 1987 he was appointed Superior judge, and subsequently stood as Judge of the Court of Appeals from 1992 until his term expired in 2001. He also served as a member of the Panel of judges of the Office of the Independent prosecutor between the years 2002–2004. From 1981 to 2001 he served as associate professor at the Polytechnic University of Puerto Rico. Starting in August 2004 he worked as the Dean of the Law School of the Pontifical Catholic University of Puerto Rico and imparted courses in labor law and collective bargaining.

In 2010, he was the editor of a book that contains excerpts of 61 of retired Puerto Rico Supreme Court Associate Justice Baltasar Corrada del Rio opinions on the Court. He is the author of several law review and law journal articles.

Academic offices
Preceded by Charles Cuprill Oppenheimer	Dean of Pontifical Catholic University of Puerto Rico School of Law; 2004-2013	Succeeded by José A. Frontera Agenjo
