= Lewis Jackson =

Lewis Jackson may refer to:

- Lewis Jackson (basketball, born 1962), men's college basketball head coach at Alabama State University
- Lewis Jackson (basketball, born 1989), American collegiate basketball player for Purdue University
- Lewis Jackson, pseudonym of Ladbroke Black (1877–1940), English journalist and author

== See also ==
- Jackson Lewis, an American law firm based in New York
