= Carlos Saavedra Gutiérrez =

Puerto Rican lawyer

21st Secretary of Labor and Human Resources of Puerto Rico
- In office January 2, 2017 – May 19, 2019
- Governor: Ricardo Rosselló
- Preceded by: Vance Thomas
- Succeeded by: Briseida Torres Reyes

Personal details
- Born: Carlos José Saavedra Gutiérrez; July 1, 1986 (age 39) Mayagüez, Puerto Rico
- Party: Republican
- Other political affiliations: New Progressive Party
- Education: University of Puerto Rico (BA, Political Science); University of Puerto Rico School of Law (JD)

Carlos José Saavedra-Gutiérrez (born July 1, 1986) is a Puerto Rican lawyer and current counsel at Jackson Lewis. Saavedra served in several high profile positions within the Government of Puerto Rico, including Secretary of Labor and Human Resources. Saavedra also served as Chief Legal Officer of the Fiscal Agency and Financial Advisory Authority of Puerto Rico, where he supervised and coordinated Puerto Rico's legal strategy as part of the largest bankruptcy-like municipal restructuring in the history of the United States.

Saavedra previously served as Secretary of Labor and Human Resources of Puerto Rico, from 2017 to 2019. Appointed by Governor Ricardo Rosselló, Saavedra was the youngest individual to lead the Puerto Rico Department of Labor. As Secretary, Saavedra oversaw the implementation of a labor reform that amended and modernized much of the labor and employment legislation in Puerto Rico. During his tenure, Puerto Rico achieved the lowest unemployment rate in the historical series as tracked by the Bureau of Labor Statistics. Conversely, during his time as Secretary he was criticized by labor unions and groups opposed to the implementation of the labor reform.

== Early life and education ==
Saavedra grew up as the oldest of two siblings in Quebradillas, Puerto Rico. He graduated high school from Colegio Nuestra Señora del Carmen in 2004. Saavedra earned his Bachelor of Arts in Political Science (2008) from the University of Puerto Rico at Río Piedras, graduating magna cum laude. In 2007, Saavedra served as an intern of Pennsylvania Senator Arlen Specter. In 2008 Saavedra entered the University of Puerto Rico School of Law, where he was Associate editor of the University of Puerto Rico Law Review. He graduated in 2011 with a Juris Doctor, magna cum laude.

== Legal career ==
Saavedra clerked in the Supreme Court of Puerto Rico for Associate Justice Mildred Pabón Charneco, after graduating Law School. After two years of service, Saavedra then worked for O’Neill & Borges, one of the largest law firms in San Juan, Puerto Rico. While at O'Neill & Borges, he handled several labor and employment law matters, including cases of unjustified terminations, national origin discrimination and Americans with Disabilities Act claims. Saavedra also provided counseling to corporate clients in matters of business immigration, including acquiring work visas, and preparation of visa petitions, including L-1 visas for intracompany transferees.

In 2015, Saavedra joined the San Juan sub-regional office of the National Labor Relations Board. As a field attorney, Saavedra investigated charges of unfair labor practices as defined by the National Labor Relations Act, litigated cases and conducted elections to determine union preferences. As a trial lawyer, Saavedra won several cases before the National Labor Relations Board, including cases concerning the employer's duty to bargain in good faith concerning preliminary collective bargaining matters.

== Puerto Rico Secretary of Labor and Human Resources ==
On December 28, 2016, Saavedra was appointed Puerto Rico Secretary of Labor and Human Resources by then Governor-elect Ricardo Rosselló. On February 11, 2017, Saavedra was confirmed by the Senate of Puerto Rico. He is the youngest person in Puerto Rican history to lead the Puerto Rico Department of Labor. In his role as Secretary, Saavedra focused on leading and overseeing the implementation of a labor reform which drastically amended and modernized most of the labor and employment laws in Puerto Rico. Also, Saavedra implemented a deregulation agenda in the Department, amending or repealing over 100 existing rules and regulations. Some of his actions during his tenure as Secretary were criticized by labor unions and related groups.

During his tenure, several changes in labor regulations took place; Saavedra oversaw the first raise in over twenty years of Puerto Rico's Unemployment insurance weekly benefits. Also, under his tenure, the Puerto Rico Department of Labor implemented an Equal Pay Act, requiring equal payment between male and female employees for comparable work. The Act also prohibited employers from inquiring on a job applicant's salary history. Saavedra also led the Puerto Rico Government's implementation concerning the Supreme Court of the United States' decision in Janus v. AFSCME, which altered the legal landscape of labor unions in the public sector. Saavedra's guidance to public agencies was found to be in accordance to law by Puerto Rico state courts.

On September 20, 2017, Puerto Rico was hit by Category 5 Hurricane María. As part of the devastation, thousands of Puerto Rican lost their jobs and unemployment claims rose to the highest numbers recorded in the island's history. During the emergency, Saavedra campaigned to disseminate the government's policies regarding private sector employees salaries. and valid reasons for dismissals. Saavedra also served as spokesperson for Governor Ricardo Rosselló during the emergency and coordinated efforts with United States Secretary of Labor Alexander Acosta concerning rebuilding efforts and the state's workforce situation.

== General Counsel to the Governor of Puerto Rico and FAFAA ==
On February 24, 2019, Governor Rosselló promoted Saavedra to the position of General Counsel to the Governor of Puerto Rico. After Governor Rosselló resigned, Saavedra remained in public service and joined the Fiscal Agency and Financial Advisory Authority of Puerto Rico (FAFAA), as Chief Legal Officer. In this position, Saavedra coordinates, the legal strategy in the Puerto Rico debt restructuring proceedings under PROMESA’s Title III.

In December, 2020, Saavedra was mentioned as a potential candidate to the Puerto Rico Supreme Court.

After leaving public service, Saavedra joined the law firm of Jackson Lewis.
