= José Aníbal Díaz =

Puerto Rican politician (1971–2023)

Member of the Puerto Rico House of Representatives from the 29th District
- In office November 16, 2015 – April 24, 2023
- Preceded by: Carlos Vargas Ferrer
- Succeeded by: Gretchen Hau

Personal details
- Born: February 16, 1971 Cayey, Puerto Rico
- Died: April 24, 2023 (aged 52) San Juan, Puerto Rico
- Party: Popular Democratic Party (PPD)
- Spouse: Migdalia Santiago
- Children: Aleysha; José Aníbal
- Education: Instituto Tecnológico de Puerto Rico (AS)

José Aníbal Díaz Collazo (February 16, 1971 – April 24, 2023) was a Puerto Rican politician affiliated with the Popular Democratic Party (PPD). He was elected to replace Carlos Vargas Ferrer in the Puerto Rico House of Representatives in 2015 after Vargas' death. Díaz represented District 29 until his death in April 2023.

== Biography ==
Díaz Collazo grew up in the Jajóme Bajo sector of Cayey. His father is Aníbal Díaz Ofray. Díaz has an associate degree in electrical engineering from the Instituto Tecnológico de Puerto Rico.

In the 1990s, Díaz started working as a housing inspector for the city of Cayey. After that, he worked as Director of Public Works for Cayey.

On October 15, 2015, Díaz announced his intention to represent District 29 (which includes Cidra and Cayey) in the House of Representatives at the upcoming general elections. In his speech, he emphasized his service to his hometown of Cayey for the past 20 years.

After the death of representative Carlos Vargas Ferrer, Díaz was selected to replace him in the Puerto Rico House of Representatives by the delegates of the Popular Democratic Party. His selection was unanimous, and was later ratified by the Governing Board of the Party. Díaz was sworn in on November 16, 2015.

== Personal life and death ==
Díaz Collazo was married to Migdalia Santiago. He had two children, Aleysha and José Aníbal Díaz.

Díaz Collazo died from cancer in San Juan, Puerto Rico on April 23, 2023, at the age of 52.
