= Pedro Cintrón Rodríguez =

Puerto Rican politician (born 1978)

Member of the Puerto Rico House of Representatives from the 29th District
- In office January 2, 2005 – January 1, 2013
- Preceded by: Héctor Ferrer
- Succeeded by: Carlos Vargas Ferrer

Personal details
- Born: April 28, 1978 (age 48) Caguas, Puerto Rico
- Party: New Progressive Party (PNP)
- Children: 2
- Education: Interamerican University of Puerto Rico (BA); University of Puerto Rico (MPA)

Pedro Iván "Banchy" Cintrón Rodríguez (born April 28, 1978) is a Puerto Rican politician affiliated with the New Progressive Party (PNP). He was a member of the Puerto Rico House of Representatives from 2005 to 2013 representing District 29.

== Early years and studies ==
Pedro Iván Cintrón Rodríguez was born in Caguas on April 28, 1978. He is the youngest of three siblings.

Cintrón graduated high school from the Colegio Católico La Merced in Cayey. He then obtained a Bachelor's degree in Political Science and Economy from the Interamerican University of Puerto Rico, graduating magna cum laude. Cintrón then completed his master's degree in public administration from the University of Puerto Rico.

During his years in college, Cintrón was president of the Association of Students of Political Science, as well as vice president of the 2000 Graduate Class.

== Political career ==
Cintrón began his political career as a voting college employee, and President of the PNP Youth in Cidra. He also served as Electoral Commissioner of the PNP Youth.

With only 26 years old, Cintrón was elected to the House of Representatives of Puerto Rico at the 2004 general election, being the youngest legislator from the 15th Legislative Assembly of Puerto Rico. During his first term, he presided the Commission of the Comptroller's Special Reports, and was vice president of the Health Commission.

After being reelected in 2008, Cintrón presided the Commissions of Housing and Urban Development. He also served as vice president of the Commission of Natural Resources.

In 2011, Cintrón announced he would run for Mayor of Cidra. However, he was defeated at the PNP primaries by Javier Carrasquillo.

== Personal life ==
Cintrón is married and has two children. He lives in Cidra.
