= Pontifical Catholic University of Puerto Rico School of Law =

Law school in Ponce, Puerto Rico founded in 1961

PUCPR School of Law
- Established: 1961; 65 years ago
- School type: Private law school
- Dean: Fernando Moreno Orama
- Location: Ponce, Puerto Rico; 18°00′09.45″N 66°36′57.28″W
- Enrollment: 501 (2023)
- Faculty: 75 (2023) (Note: Includes full-time and non-full-time faculty)
- Bar pass rate: 35.29% (2022)
- Website: derecho.pucpr.edu
- ABA profile: ABA Profile

The Pontifical Catholic University of Puerto Rico School of Law is the law school of the Pontifical Catholic University of Puerto Rico, a private Catholic university with its main campus in Ponce, Puerto Rico. It was established in 1961.

== History ==
It was the first private law school established in Puerto Rico. The law school is located in the Spellman Building and was founded in 1961 by Monsignor Fremiot Torres Oliver. The law school received the accreditation from the Puerto Rico Superior Education Council of Puerto Rico on 13 April 1964. The American Bar Association granted provisional accreditation on 13 April 1967, and final accreditation in August 1972. The Law School offers the course of study leading to the J.D. degree through a three-year full-time day and a four-year part-time evening programs. The law school admits students for its fall (August) and spring (January) sessions. It offers two Joint Degree Programs, the J.D./M.B.A. and J.D./M.P.A. with the University graduate programs.

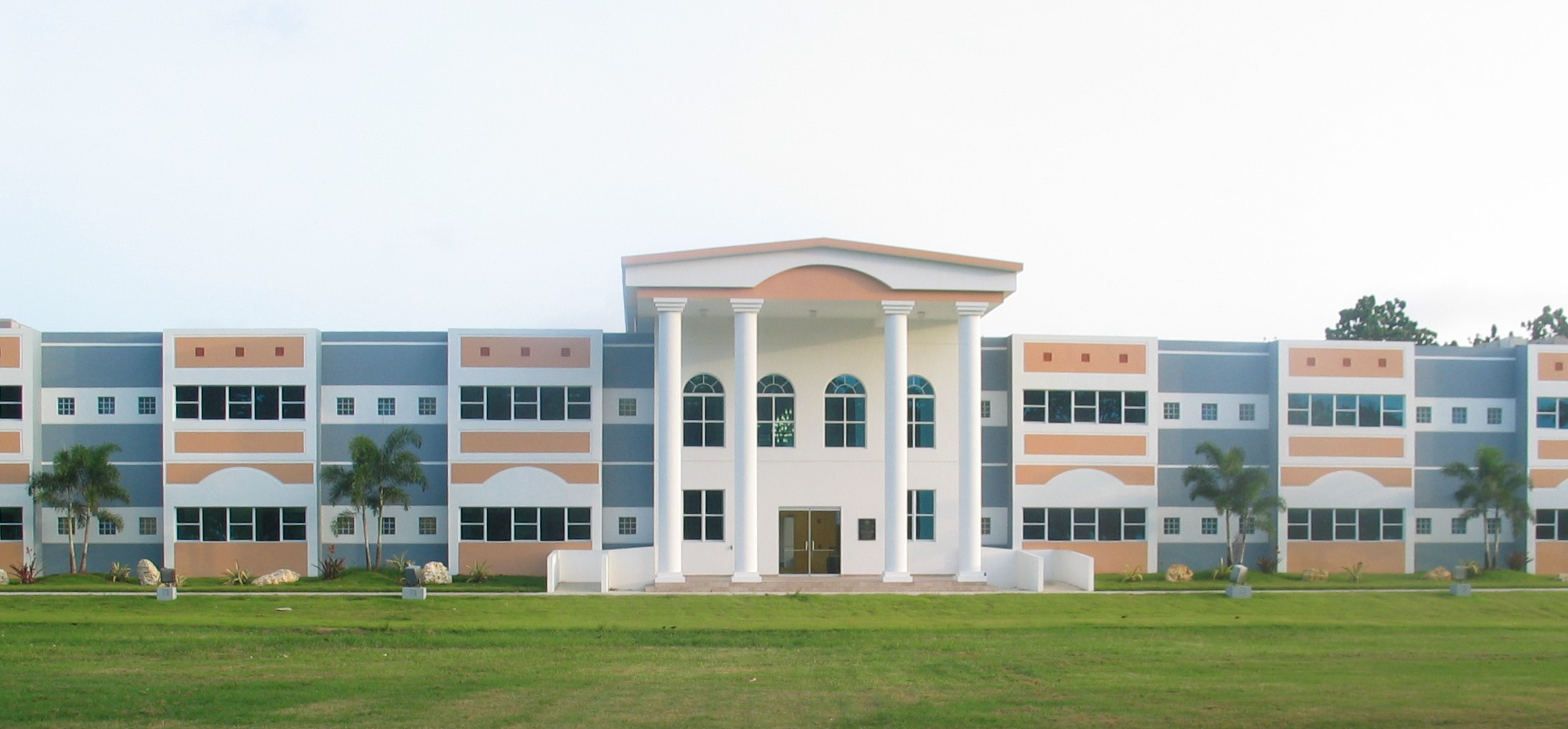
PUCPR School of Law in Ponce, Puerto Rico

The School of Law houses a major research library with a collection of about 207,095 volumes and extensive computer-assisted research capabilities including Lexis/Nexis, Westlaw, and MICROJURIS.COM with wireless access to the Internet from anywhere in the law school campus. It is the home of the Revista de Derecho Puertorriqueno which is a student and faculty edited law review published since 1961. The School of Law is noted for its Legal Service Clinic and Externship programs that offer to its students the opportunity to serve the community and the poor in need of legal services.

The law school has the most active national law student organizations in Puerto Rico, with local chapters of The Federalist Society, the American Bar Association, the Federal Bar Association and the American Association of Trial Lawyers.

Fernando Moreno Orama is the dean.

On May 15, 2020, the council of the American Bar Association's Section of Legal Education and Admissions to the Bar met remotely and determined this school and nine others had significant noncompliance with Standard 316. This Standard was revised in 2019 to provide that at least 75% of an accredited law school's graduates who took a bar exam must pass one within two years of graduation. The school was asked to submit a report by February 1, 2021; and, if the council did not find the report demonstrated compliance, the school would be asked to appear before the council at its May, 2021 meeting. In 2022, the council gave the school a three-year extension for bar pass compliance. In early 2024, based on statistics for 2021 graduates, the school had a two year passrate of just 63.33%. On May 31, 2023, the ABA further found "significant noncompliance" involving Standard 501(a), relating to schools publishing and following sound admissions policies, as well as Standard 501(b), requiring that schools only admit applicants who appear capable of completing law school and being admitted to practice law.

== Post-graduation employment ==
According to the Pontifical Catholic University's 2013 ABA-required disclosures, 4.17% of the Class of 2013 obtained full-time, long-term, JD-required employment nine months after graduation, excluding solo practitioners. The Pontifical Catholic University's Law School Transparency under-employment score is 49.6%, indicating the percentage of the Class of 2013 unemployed, pursuing an additional degree, or working in a non-professional, short-term, or part-time job nine months after graduation, and an unknown score of 32.5%, indicated the percentage of graduates whose employment status was not known.

ABA Employment Summary for 2013 Graduates
Employment Status	Percentage
Employed – Bar Passage Required	15.83%
Employed – J.D. Advantage	5.42%
Employed – Professional Position	13.75%
Employed – Non-Professional Position	1.67%
Employed – Undeterminable	0.0%
Pursuing Graduate Degree Full Time	1.67%
Unemployed – Start Date Deferred	1.25%
Unemployed – Not Seeking	0.42%
Unemployed – Seeking	27.5%
Employment Status Unknown	32.5%
Total of 240 Graduates

== Notable faculty ==
- Rafael Hernández Colón – Former Governor of Puerto Rico
- Héctor Luis Acevedo – Former Secretary of State and Mayor of San Juan
- Alfredo J. Mora – Former adjutant general of the Puerto Rico National Guard
- Charles Cuprill Oppenheimer – Past Rotary District Governor, Retired Mayor General, Puerto Rico National Guard. Served 3 times as Dean of the Law School. One of the Founders of Ponce School of Medicine. Two time president of Phi Sigma Alpha and "Hermano Emeritus" Medal holder of the Fraternity.

== Notable alumni ==
- Deborah Seilhamer – athlete and daughter of Senator Larry Seilhamer
- Carlos Vargas Ferrer – Representative PPD/District 29 Cidra-Cayey House of Representatives of Puerto Rico
- Aida Delgado-Colón - Judge of the United States District Court for the District of Puerto Rico
- Ruy Delgado Zayas - former Secretary of Labor and Human Resources of Puerto Rico

== Student organizations ==
- Student Council
- Federal Bar Association
- Phi Alpha Delta Law Fraternity
- Phi Sigma Alpha fraternity
- Nu Sigma Beta fraternity
- American Bar Association
- Organización Pro-Derecho de la Mujer – Pro-female Rights Organization
- The Federalist Society
- Phi Eta Mu fraternity
- Delta Theta Phi Law Fraternity International
- Educca
- Prima Facie – Student Newspaper
- Tuna de la Escuela de Derecho – University Tuna
- Asociacion de Notarios de Puerto Rico / Capítulo Estudiantil
- Association of Trial Lawyers of America
- American Association of Trial Lawyers.
- APMA-Asociación para la Prevención del Maltrato de Animales
- Sports & Entertainment Law Students Association
- Revista de Derecho Puertorriqueño

== See also ==
- Pontifical Catholic University of Puerto Rico at Mayagüez
- Ponce School of Medicine
