= Charles Cuprill Oppenheimer =

Puerto Rican United States Army general

- Born: September 12, 1916; Ponce, Puerto Rico
- Died: October 7, 2011 (aged 95)
- Burial place: Las Mercedes Cemetery in Ponce, Puerto Rico
- Military career
- Allegiance: United States
- Branch: United States Army; Army National Guard
- Rank: Major General
- Commands: 3rd Battalion 296th Infantry Regiment
- Conflicts: World War II; Korean War
- Other work: Dean of Pontifical Catholic University School of Law.

Charles Cuprill Oppenheimer (September 12, 1916 – October 7, 2011) was a lawyer, Rotary International District Governor for Puerto Rico, a war veteran, and a retired major general in the Puerto Rico National Guard.

== Background ==
Cuprill Oppenheimer was born on September 12, 1916, in the city of Ponce, Puerto Rico. Ponce was the second-largest city in Puerto Rico and was important economically, culturally, socially, and politically at the time. Cuprill's parents were Ramón Fundador Cuprill Rivera and Isabel Oppenheimer Figueroa. He had five siblings: Lydian, Irma, Warren, Charles Evans, and Rambel.

Cuprill Oppenheimer married his college sweetheart, Lidia María Hernández Collazo, whose father, civil engineer José Alfredo Hernández Buitrago, worked for almost five decades at the prominent Central Mercedita sugar cane plantation refinery and Don Q rum distillery. Cuprill and Lidia were married for over 60 years and had three children: Charles Alfred, Hector Rambel, and Raymond Warren. Cuprill loved spending time with his six grandchildren, Marilu, Natalie, Hector, Mercedes, Charles, and Diana, as well as his many great-grandchildren. He enjoyed the simple things in life and the company of his family and friends. Cuprill and Lidia traveled extensively throughout the North American Continent, Europe, Asia, Latin America, the Caribbean, and the Middle East.

Cuprill had a special retreat called "Monticello" in the majestic mountains of Puerto Rico, where he enjoyed spending time with friends and family. He was an avid world traveler with his wife, Lidia.

== Military career ==
Charles Cuprill Oppenheimer was a veteran of both World War II and the Korean War. In 1940, he enrolled in the Army Reserve Officers' Training Corps (ROTC) program and graduated. He took a temporary leave of absence from attending the University of Puerto Rico School of Law in 1941-1942 when he was asked to serve in the United States Army during World War II as a 2nd lieutenant in Company "L" of the 65th Infantry Regiment. After World War II ended, he was honorably discharged from active duty military service in 1946 with the rank of major, at the age of 30, to resume the pursuit of a Juris Doctor degree and a law career.

In 1950-1953, Cuprill Oppenheimer was ordered to return to military active duty with the Puerto Rico National Guard during the Korean War, which interrupted his law practice once again. During the war, he commanded the 3rd Battalion of the 296th Infantry Regiment, which provided replacements to its sister company deployed in Korea. He later became the Commanding Officer of the Henry Barracks Army base in Cayey, Puerto Rico, where United States' draftees were trained before being sent as replacements to the 65th Infantry Regiment.

Cuprill Oppenheimer retired from the Puerto Rico National Guard with the rank of major general. He was proud to have founded the Ponce Chapter of the Military Order of the World Wars (MOWW) along with his son Hector, of which both are life members. He was also actively involved in many other military organizations, such as the Reserve Officers Association (ROA).

== Law career ==
Cuprill Oppenheimer was admitted to practice law in Puerto Rico in 1947 by the Puerto Rico Supreme Court. At the time, the bar examination and admission process required an extensive oral examination administered by each individual Puerto Rico Supreme Court Justice. Upon passing the bar exam, the U.S. Supreme Court would confer a license to practice law in Puerto Rico. Cuprill Oppenheimer was also admitted to the United States Supreme Court Bar. However, his law career was interrupted twice when he had to serve his nation during World War II and the Korean War.

Cuprill Oppenheimer's sacrifices were rewarded with a successful law practice that lasted over 50 years. He was highly regarded in the legal community and known for his appellate work in property and administrative law. He was instrumental and influential in setting landmark jurisprudence with the Puerto Rico Supreme Court in a multitude of cases argued before both the Puerto Rico Supreme Court and the U.S. Supreme Court.

== Academia ==
He earned his bachelor's in political science from the University of Puerto Rico in 1940 and his Juris Doctor from the UPR school of law in 1947.

He served three terms as Dean of Pontifical Catholic University School of Law. During his tenure as Dean, the Law School received approval of the American Bar Association. He was one of the founders and a trustee emeritus of the Ponce School of Medicine.

Cuprill was a two-time president of Phi Sigma Alpha and "Hermano Emeritus" Medal holder of the Fraternity.

In 1950, he was one of the founders of the Gamma-Boriquen chapter of Fi Sigma Alpha fraternity. Rotary International was the most important part of his life. Initially joining the Ponce Rotary Club, he was later co-founder and first President of the El Vigia Rotary Rotary Club. One of the highlights of his life was being selected as Rotary Governor for the Puerto Rico District. He also often participated in the DeLand Rotary Club. Cuprill Oppenheimer was appointed to Government Committees by all the elected Governors of the Commonwealth of Puerto Rico. He was also Chairman of the PR Electoral Reform Commission. He was a member of the Equestrian Order of the Holy Sepulchre of Jerusalem.

== Legacy ==
The Charles R. Cuprill Oppenheimer Award is an annual award given to the graduate student with the most outstanding grade in the Administrative Law Course that Cuprill Oppenheimer taught for five decades at the Pontifical Catholic University School of Law, where he was later named a Law Professor Emeritus. The Federalist Society Chapter of the same law school is also named after him.

Cuprill Oppenheimer's legacy extends to his family as well. His three sons, Charles Alfred, Hector Rambel Sr., and Raymond Warren, became attorneys, and his oldest grandson, Hector R. Cuprill Jr., and youngest granddaughter, Diana I. Cuprill, pursued law careers. His oldest son, Charles A. Cuprill Hernandez, is a prominent bankruptcy business reorganization specialist involved in thoroughbred racing. His son Hector R. Cuprill Hernandez, a business and civil trial lawyer, taught Civil Procedure and Evidence and assisted him as Associate Dean at the Catholic University of PR Law School. His youngest son, Raymond Warren Cuprill Hernandez, retired from the Legal Division of the National Highway Administration in D.C.

== Awards and decorations ==

	American Defense Service Medal	
American Campaign Medal	National Defense Service Medal	World War II Victory Medal
European-African-Middle Eastern Campaign Medal	Korean Service Medal	United Nations Korea Medal

Badges:

- Combat Infantryman Badge

Academic offices
Preceded by Pedro Ortiz Álvarez	Dean of Pontifical Catholic University of Puerto Rico School of Law; 1986-1989	Succeeded by Carlos Rivera Lugo
Preceded by José Alberto Morales Rodríguez	Dean of Pontifical Catholic University of Puerto Rico School of Law; 1998-2004	Succeeded by Angel González Román
