= Manuel Natal Albelo =

Puerto Rican lawyer and politician (born 1986)

Manuel Natal
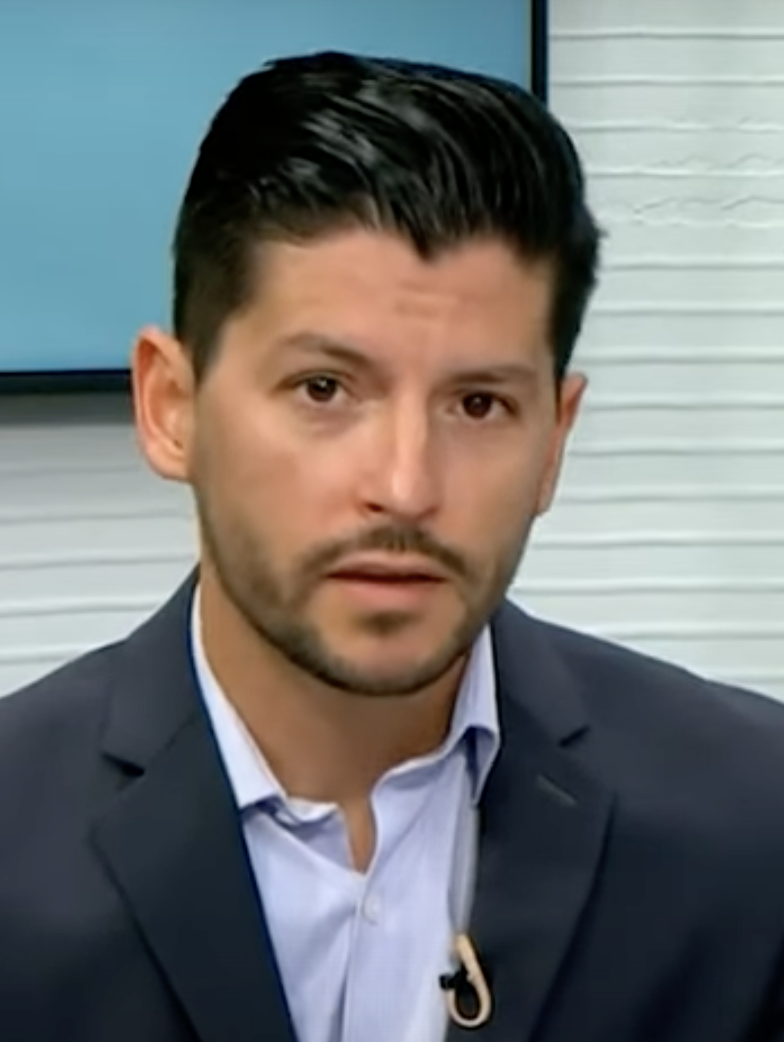

Member of the House of Representatives of Puerto Rico from At-large district
- In office August 19, 2013 – January 2, 2021
- Preceded by: Eduardo Ferrer

Personal details
- Born: Manuel Antonio Natal Albelo; March 25, 1986 (age 40) San Juan, Puerto Rico
- Party: PPD (2013–2018); MVC (2019–present)
- Education: Cornell University (BA); University of Puerto Rico School of Law (JD)
- Profession: MVC General Coordinator
- Website: www.manuelnatal.com

Manuel Antonio Natal Albelo (born March 25, 1986) is a former member of the 29th House of Representatives of Puerto Rico. Natal is currently affiliated with the Citizen's Victory Movement party after being previously affiliated with the Popular Democratic Party and a legal advisor for Charlie Hernández, another member of the House, before becoming a legislator. He was a member of the free association movement, colloquially known as soberanistas. Elected at the age of 27, Natal is one of the youngest legislators in the history of Puerto Rico and was the youngest legislator to serve at the time of his election. He was the Movimiento Victoria Ciudadana party's nominee in the 2020 San Juan mayoral election, which he lost to senator Miguel Romero of the New Progressive Party. He was again his party's nominee in the 2024 mayoral election, once again being defeated by Romero.

== Early years and education ==
Natal was born into a family with strong ties to the local politics. His maternal uncle, Javier Albelo Matos, served as a candidate for the mayorship of Ciales the 2000 general election, while his paternal grandfather was an activist for the Partido Popular Democratico (PPD). He studied at Colegio Espíritu Santo in Hato Rey, where he was president of the Student Council. Natal obtained a bachelor's degree from Cornell University in 2008, where he was president of the Puerto Rican Student Association and an Hermano of Lambda Upsilon Lambda fraternity. He did not expect to be accepted by the institution, having applied to study in it as a protocolary measure. When the acceptance letter was received, Natal was surprised and this event triggered a period of adaptation. He offered a speech at his graduation in his role of class president. After returning to Puerto Rico, Natal received a juris doctor from the University of Puerto Rico School of Law in 2011, also serving as president of the student council during his tenure. After graduating from Cornell, Natal became a key figure in a series of strikes held at the University of Puerto Rico in protest of a quota being introduced to the students. Consequently, he became involved with the Popular Democratic Party and participated in an internal election for the presidency of the party's National Youth organization. After completing his juris doctor Natal opened his own law firm and worked for Charlie Hernández and Luis Vega Ramos, prominent members of the free association movement. In 2013, Natal was named director of the House of Representatives of Puerto Rico Commission on the Judiciary.

== Representative at-large (2013–2021) ==
=== Election to the House of Representatives ===
A few months after Natal became director of the House Commission on the Judiciary, Eduardo Ferrer relinquished his position of Representative at-large for the PPD, formally opening a vacancy at the House for the PPD. The party announced that the position would be filled with the vote of the General Council's delegates during a special election. Subsequently, Natal formally announced that he was going to pursue the vacancy and submitted the required documentation on August 5, 2013. His bid was seen as "difficult", since the PPD's conservative leadership (led by Alejandro García Padilla, incumbent Governor and President of the PPD) was at the moment in direct conflict with the free association movement over the continuation of the territorial clause. Besides him, nine other members presented the required documentation before the deadline. Only five candidates made the cut to be on the final ballot, Claribel Martínez Marmolejos, Yasmín Mejías, Carlos Rechani, Darlene Reyes and Natal. Unofficial polls organized by Radio Isla 1320 and Representative Carlos Vargas concluded that the public favored Natal over the four other candidates. The special election took an ideological emphasis after García Padilla dismissed the free association movement, implying that they were a reduced group by saying that the free association movement, "are not a wing, but rather a few feathers", illustrating his opposition to the faction by publicly supporting Martínez. Natal indirectly referred to this event, adopting the slogan, "Quills have written the best chapters of our history."

In the days leading to the special election, the PPD's leadership strengthened its campaign to secure the votes for Martínez, including public support from Eduardo Bhatia, President of the Senate of Puerto Rico, and Jaime Perelló, Speaker of the House. Public reports claimed that the PPD's conservative leadership was aggressive in its support campaign for Martínez, even offering jobs to the delegates in exchange for their votes. This raised concern among the other candidates, with Rechani, Mejías and former contestant Ruthy Currás claiming they had been pressured to abandon the race. Despite this, Natal opted to ignore the controversy, instead continuing with his campaign and presenting a series of proposals. The special election took place on August 14, 2013, with Natal defeating Martínez with a margin of 175 to 131, with 20 votes being divided between the other candidates. He effectively became a member of the House and a legislator on August 19, 2013, at the age of 26, after the House inaugurated its second ordinary session. Natal's first official action was to serve as cosponsor of P.C. 1334, a bill that specifies a method to select the delegates of a Constituent Assembly that will deal with the political status of Puerto Rico between 2014 and 2018. He was given the presidency of the Integrated Commission for Youth Development, Promotion and Retention of New Talent. Natal was also named vicepresident of the commissions of International & Federal Affairs and Veteran Affairs, while also participating in five others.

=== Political track record ===
His first original project was a proposal to retain young professionals and minimize the migration rate. The project was based on the reduction of bureaucratic requirements for the foundation of new enterprises and the eventual creation of an Institute for Entrepreneurship. Further efforts included the inclusion of classes focused on entrepreneurship in the education curriculum and the creation of a similar institute focused on business education for youth. Natal explained that the ultimate goal of these proposals was to retain the capital among local businesses, reducing its export by foreign corporations. His next initiative sought the international recognition of the Puerto Rican citizenship through the Secretary of State, pursuing more rights within the international community. A related project, P.C. 1417, also revoked an amendment made to the Political Code of Puerto Rico by the pro-statehood government of Pedro Rosselló, which only granted Puerto Rican citizenship to those who already possessed United States citizenship, effectively preventing foreign immigrants from claiming it.

On December 21, 2013, Natal was the only member of the PPD to oppose a bill that reduced the retirement pension received by teachers. This decision was preceded by days of reunions with education guilds, which took place in the midst of an accelerated and controversial special session called forth by García Padilla. Natal was the last member of a larger group to remain firm in his original position, with the others yielding and offering explanatory votes. He represented the Agricultural, Natural & Environmental Resources Commission during the public hearings of a project that pursued amends to the Biotechnology Law, there he expressed concerns that the proposed changes would facilitate multinational experiments without supervision and questioned if Monsanto was involved by supporting the bill. Furthermore, Natal noted that the entire process should be analyzed while taking under consideration the poor track record of biotechnology corporations and the multiples controversies surrounding their crops.

After Standard & Poor's downgraded the government's credit to BB rating, Natal opened a webpage where he intended to gather civil proposals to attend to the crisis. He followed this with P.C. 1740, which proposed equitable salaries between men and women. On March 17, 2014, Natal presented a bill to deal with water scarcity by prohibiting its exportation during droughts, which received the cognomen of P. C. 1764.

=== 2020 San Juan mayoral campaign ===
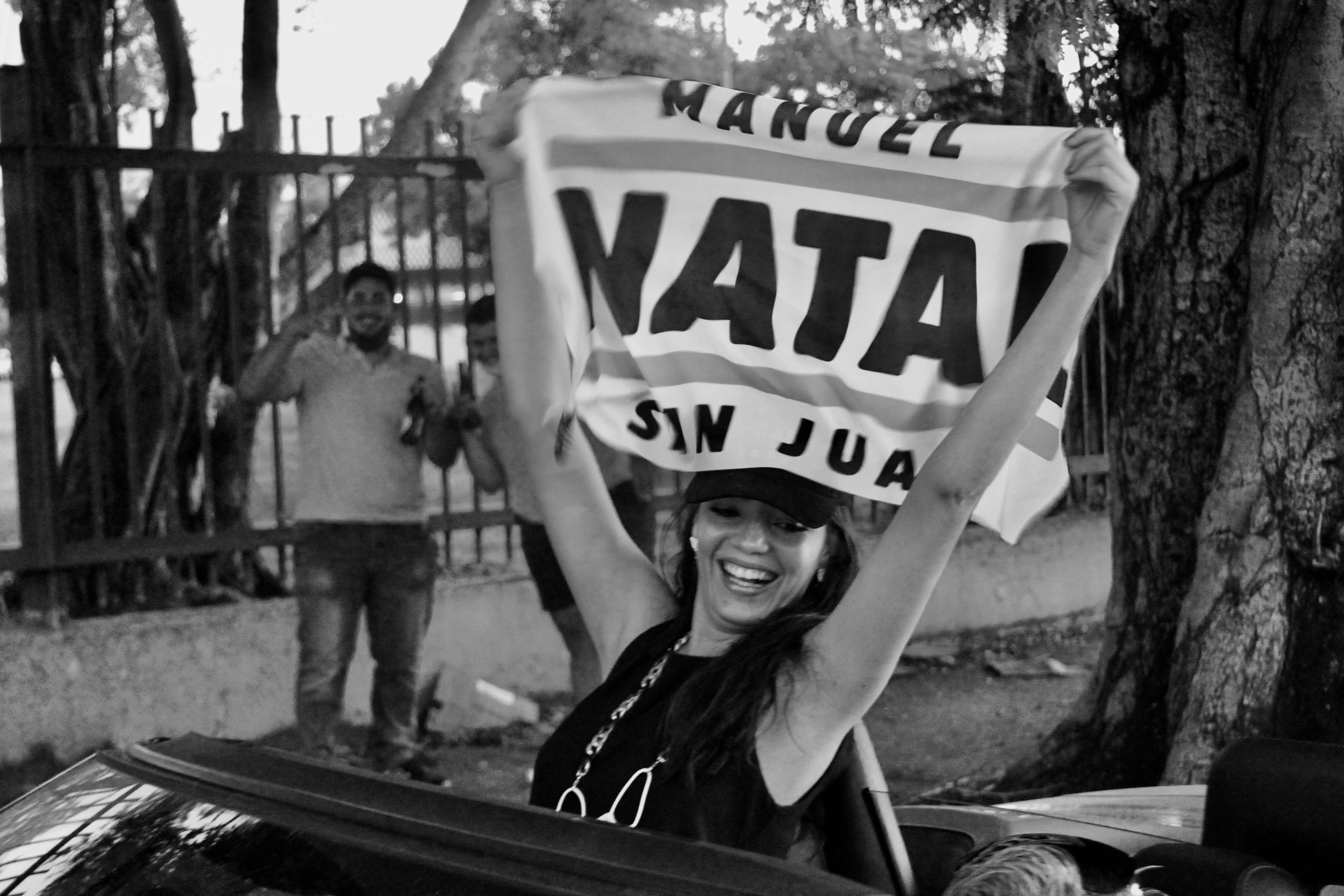
Supporter of Natal's mayoral campaign

In November 2019, Natal announced his candidacy for mayor of San Juan as the Movimiento Victoria Ciudadana party's candidate in the 2020 mayoral election. He placed second in the election, losing to Senator Miguel Romero of the New Progressive Party.

After the election, Natal launched a legal battle demanding a new election for the municipality's 77th Unit, which groups together several forms of absentee-voting and mail-in ballots, claiming widespread irregularities during the counting process and leading up to the election. His lawsuit was dismissed by a judge in January 2021.

=== 2024 San Juan mayoral campaign ===
In November 2023, Natal announced his second run for mayor of San Juan as the Movimiento Victoria Ciudadana party's candidate in the 2020 mayoral election. He again placed second in the election, losing to incumbent Mayor Miguel Romero of the New Progressive Party. On May 27, 2024, Natal was replaced as MVC General Coordinator by Resident Commissioner candidate Ana Irma Rivera Lassén. Natal then led the efforts of the Citizen Victory Movement and the Country Alliance in the municipality of San Juan before the general elections.

== Personal life and ideology ==
Upon completing his education, Natal settled in Old San Juan. He is an avid follower of sports, and practices cycling, basketball and triathlon. He was the original PPD's representative in Panel Político, a daily radio show hosted by reporter Normando Valentín in WKAQ 580, where he served as the counterweight of Gary Rodríguez. On March 4, 2014, Natal decided to abandon the program citing no interest to continue involved in "destructive" and "irresponsible" partisan discussions, a decision influenced by opposition senator Carmelo Ríos who accused him on air of participating in a protest where protesters had placed dog food and a "Beware of Dog" sign before a SWAT line during the 2010 strike. The PNP had promoted this supposed incident since he was elected, despite being asked in a formal letter to desist. Natal claimed that a series of anonymous threats related to his purported involvement in the incident had been received by mail, endangering his family. The following day, the group that was actually involved in the protest, members of a plastic artistry movement named Indi.gestión, publicly stated that Natal was never involved in it and denied even knowing him personally. Natal expressed gratitude that the group decided to clear his reputation on its own initiative, also clarifying that Indi.gestión was not related to the UPR student movement in any way.

== Electoral history ==
=== House of Representatives of Puerto Rico ===
2016 Popular Democratic Party's at-large House of Representatives primaries
Party	Candidate	Votes	%	Result
Popular Democratic Party	Brenda López de Arrarás	117,128	14.46	Elected
Popular Democratic Party	Jaime Perelló	103,550	12.78	Elected
Popular Democratic Party	Luis Vega Ramos	97,811	12.07	Elected
Popular Democratic Party	Jesús Manuel Ortiz	86,736	10.70	Elected
Popular Democratic Party	Jorge Colberg Toro	72,994	9.01	Elected
Popular Democratic Party	Manuel Natal Albelo	67,377	8.32	Elected
Popular Democratic Party	Yaramary Torres	63,881	7.88	
Popular Democratic Party	Ulises Dalmau	62,045	7.66	
Popular Democratic Party	Roberto Vigoreaux	54,335	6.71	
Popular Democratic Party	Eluis Vick	24,546	3.03	
Popular Democratic Party	Cristofer Malespín	22,785	2.81	
Popular Democratic Party	Mario Pabón	18,874	2.33	
Popular Democratic Party	Gil A. Rodríguez Ramos	18,215	2.25	
Total		810,277	100	
Source: CEEPUR

2016 Puerto Rico's at-large House of Representatives election
Party	Candidate	Votes	%	Result
New Progressive Party	María Milagros Charbonier	136,905	9.43	Elected
Popular Democratic Party	Manuel Natal Albelo	134,040	9.23	Elected
Popular Democratic Party	Brenda López de Arrarás	123,974	8.54	Elected
Puerto Rican Independence Party	Denis Márquez	121,066	8.34	Elected
New Progressive Party	Néstor Alonso	118,439	8.16	Elected
New Progressive Party	José "Pichy" Torres Zamora	116,942	8.05	Elected
New Progressive Party	José E. Meléndez Ortíz	113,564	7.82	Elected
New Progressive Party	Lourdes Ramos	113,315	7.80	Elected
New Progressive Party	José Aponte Hernández	106,588	7.34	Elected
Popular Democratic Party	Luis Vega Ramos	101,669	7.00	Elected
Popular Democratic Party	Jesús Manuel Ortiz	85,715	5.90	Elected
Popular Democratic Party	Jorge Colberg Toro	80,567	5.55	
Popular Democratic Party	Jaime Perelló	79,922	5.50	
Working People's Party	Félix Córdova Iturregui	19,537	1.35	
Total		1,221,737	100	
Source: CEEPUR

=== San Juan mayor ===
2020 San Juan mayoral election
Party	Candidate	Votes	%
New Progressive	Miguel Romero	46,427	36.60
Citizens' Victory	Manuel Natal Albelo	42,962	33.87
Popular Democratic	Rossana López León	29,451	23.22
Independence	Adrián González Costa	4,157	3.28
Project Dignity	Nelson Rosario Rodríguez	3,848	3.03
Total votes		126,845	100
