= Carlos Vargas Ferrer =

Puerto Rican politician (1971-2015)

Member of the Puerto Rico House of Representatives from the 29th District
- In office January 2, 2013 – November 2, 2015
- Preceded by: Pedro Cintrón Rodríguez
- Succeeded by: José Aníbal Díaz

Personal details
- Born: June 28, 1971 Mayagüez, Puerto Rico
- Died: November 2, 2015 (aged 44) San Juan, Puerto Rico
- Party: Popular Democratic Party (PPD)
- Spouse: Angela Rodríguez
- Children: Julianna; Osvaldo
- Education: University of Puerto Rico at Mayagüez (BA); Pontifical Catholic University of Puerto Rico School of Law (JD)
- Profession: Attorney

Carlos J. Vargas Ferrer (June 28, 1971 – November 2, 2015) was a Puerto Rican politician affiliated with the Popular Democratic Party (PPD). He was elected to the Puerto Rico House of Representatives in 2012 to represent District 29.

Vargas died on the morning of November 2, 2015, after a car accident. He was 44 years old.

== Early life and education ==
Carlos Vargas Ferrer was born in Mayagüez, Puerto Rico, but raised in the nearby town of San Sebastián. From an early age, he was raised by his mother, Paulina Ferrer, and his stepfather, Ramón Vargas. Vargas officially adopted him when Carlos was 25 years old. In an interview, Vargas said "being adopted is one of the most beautiful experiences of my life ... [My stepfather] was always my father, emotionally he always was".

Vargas attended the University of Puerto Rico at Mayagüez. He graduated in 1994 with a bachelor's degree in Science and a Major in Biology. After that, he completed a Juris Doctor from the Pontifical Catholic University of Puerto Rico School of Law, graduating Magna Cum Laude. Subsequently, Vargas passed the bar exam with a score of 94%.

== Professional career ==
Vargas Ferrer started practicing law in 2000. He also litigated at the Court of Appeals in Boston. Vargas also worked as legal aide for the municipality of Carolina, specifically for the Office of Urban Affairs. He also worked as legal aide to the Chairman of the Public Building Authority, as well as legal director of the Public Corporation for the Supervision and Insurance of Cooperative Institutions (COSSEC). Vargas also had his private practice office in Cidra where he established himself in the mid-2000s.

== Political career ==
When Vargas decided to enter politics, his family was against it. His mother-in-law was the only one that encouraged him to do so. According to his wife, Vargas was "tired of being on the other side. He was tired of being an observer."

Vargas Ferrer was elected to the House of Representatives of Puerto Rico on the 2012 general elections. He was elected to represent District 29. During his tenure as representative, he led the Banking and Financial Affairs Committee of the House and the Committee of Housing and Urban Development. He was also a permanent member of the Committees of Tax, Health, and Cooperativism, among others.

Vargas distinguished himself for leading what was considered by some as "avant garde" projects in favor of the medicalization of marihuana, eliminating voting rights to convicts, and expanding rights to the LGBT community, among others. In 2013, during an interview with a regional newspaper, he expressed himself "satisfied" with his work during his first 100 days as a representative.

== Personal life ==
Vargas was married to Angela Rodríguez Acosta. They had two children together, Julianna and Osvaldo. Rodríguez said in an interview that Vargas was "a very bright person. What made me fall in love with him was his intelligence."

In 2010, Vargas underwent bariatric surgery at the Mennonite Hospital in Aibonito, and went from weighing 427 to 186 pounds. After that, he kept himself involved in fitness and exercise, participating in several marathons. He said in an interview that the key to maintaining his weight was "lots of exercise ... once I started exercising, I haven't stopped."

=== Death ===
In the morning of November 2, 2015, Vargas Ferrer was driving in San Juan, when he apparently suffered a cardiorespiratory arrest. This caused him to hit a newspaper vendor and then an electrical post. He was treated by paramedics but was eventually declared dead at Medical Center. Governor Alejandro García Padilla declared three days of mourning as a result of Vargas' death.

A ceremony was held on November 4, 2015, at the Capitol of Puerto Rico. The next day, Vargas Ferrer remains were transferred to San Sebastián for another ceremony. His remains were cremated and his organs donated.
