= Mariana Nogales Molinelli =

Puerto Rican politician

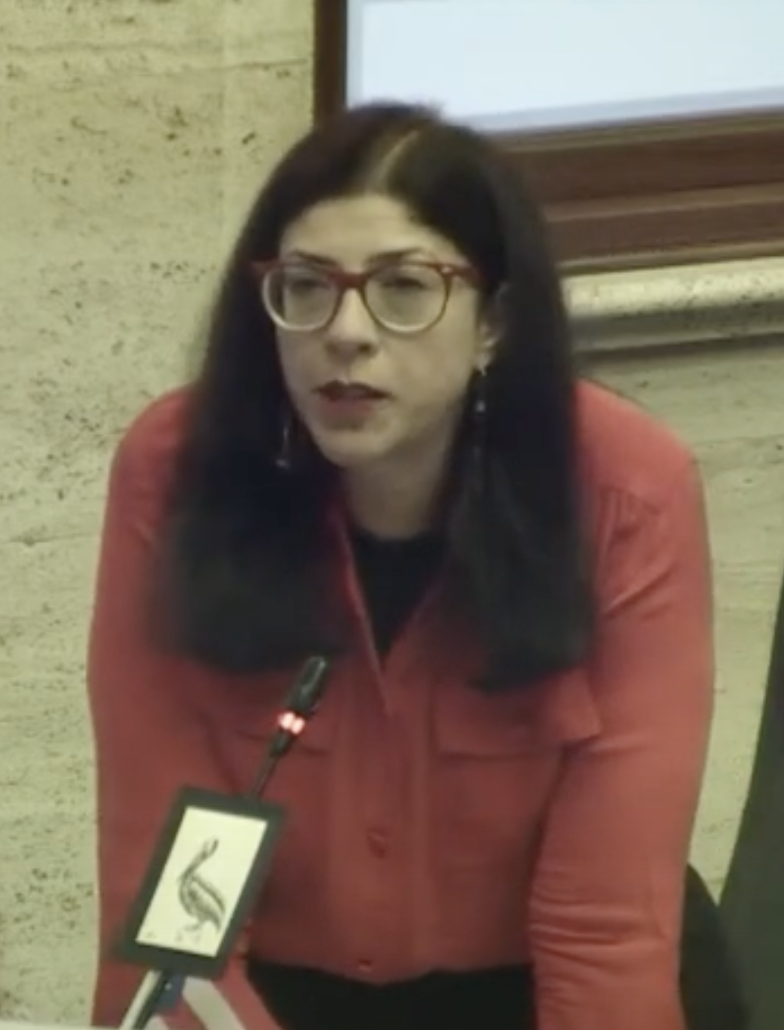

Member of the Puerto Rico House of Representatives from the at-large district
- In office January 2, 2021 – January 2, 2025

Personal details
- Born: October 26, 1973 (age 52) Humacao, Puerto Rico
- Party: Movimiento Victoria Ciudadana
- Education: University of Puerto Rico (BA); University of Puerto Rico School of Law (JD)
- Profession: Attorney

Mariana Nogales Molinelli (born October 26, 1973) is a Puerto Rican lawyer, politician, and social activist. In 2020, she was elected to the House of Representatives of Puerto Rico for the Citizens' Victory Movement (MVC) party. She had previously run as the Working People's Party of Puerto Rico's candidate for resident commissioner in the 2016 election; she received over 19,000 votes, and ended up in 4th place. She studied environmental sciences at the University of Puerto Rico, where she completed a bachelor's degree in psychology in 2006. In 2010 Mariana Nogales Molinelli earned a juris doctor from the University of Puerto Rico School of Law. She also received the Thurgood Marshall Award from the Puerto Rico Civil Rights Commission.

== Activism ==
Since 2011 Nogales has practiced law on the island in the areas of family matters, civil, penal, labor and notary laws. From 2009 to 2010 Nogales was coordinator general for the campaign to abolish the death penalty on the island. Nogales is a recognized figure among the Puerto Rican left. She has secular beliefs, and is the founder of Humanistas Seculares de Puerto Rico (Secular Humanists of Puerto Rico, in English) an organization that advocates for the separation of church and state. In 2017 she opposed the declaration of 40 days of prayer and fasting in the House of Representatives.

Nogales is a self-declared feminist. She has collaborated with feminist organizations such as the Movimiento Amplio de Mujeres and Proyecto Matria. In 2021 she supported protest in favour of permanently closing the Dr. Juan A. Rivero Zoo.

At the funeral service for Carlos Romero Barceló Nogales wore a t-shirt protesting the Cerro Maravilla murders that occurred under the governor's tenure.

== PPT ==
In 2015 Nogales was selected as one of the PPT party leaders subsequently becoming the party president.

== House of Representatives ==
In 2020 Nogales was elected to the House of Representatives at large with 87,000 votes representing the third largest number of votes.

Nogales was the author of the House of Representatives resolution 213, created to investigate the cutting of trees around the island in an attempt to reduce deforestation.

In 2023 Nogales was charged along with her mother and their Ocean Front Corporation for tax evasion. The previous December Nogales was fined $2,000 and publicly rebuked by the House of Representatives. In April 2024, the Supreme Court ordered the suspension of the judicial process against Mariana Nogales Molinelli, accepting the request for “certiorari” and the request for judicial assistance presented by the Office of the Independent Special Prosecutor's Group (OPFEI).
