= Vance Thomas =

Puerto Rican politician

Vance E. Thomas Rider

Secretary of Labor and Human Resources of Puerto Rico
- In office January 2, 2013 – January 2, 2017
- Governor: Alejandro García Padilla
- Preceded by: Miguel Romero
- Succeeded by: Carlos Saavedra Gutiérrez

Personal details
- Born: Jacksonville, Illinois
- Party: Puerto Rican Independence Party
- Education: University of Puerto Rico, Rio Piedras Campus
- Occupation: Attorney
- Website: Twitter; LinkedIn profile

Vance Thomas Rider is an attorney who former Secretary of Labor and Human Resources of Puerto Rico under the governance of Alejandro García Padilla in the 16th Cabinet of Puerto Rico. Thomas was a former candidate for mayor of Culebra in 1992 for the Puerto Rican Independence Party and a former candidate for mayor of San Juan in 2000 for the same party. In 2012, however, Thomas favored García Padilla during the Puerto Rican General Elections although they are from different political parties. Thomas also led the Puerto Rico Commission on Civil Rights and the Puerto Rico Committee on the Conservation of Culebra's Seabed.

Thomas is a graduate from the University of Puerto Rico School of Law. Graduated from graduate school of Planning with courses for master's degree in environmental planning and a bachelor's degree in political science from the University of Puerto Rico.
