= Edwin Cornier =

Municipal legislator for Aguadilla and youngest elected individual in Puerto Rico

- Edwin José Cornier Colón

Municipal legislator of the Municipality of Aguadilla
- Incumbent
- Assumed office January 2, 2021

Personal details
- Born: October 1, 2002 (age 23) Mayagüez, Puerto Rico
- Citizenship: United States of America
- Party: Popular Democratic Party (Puerto Rico) (2026-present) Movimiento Victoria Ciudadana (2019-2026)
- Education: University of Puerto Rico at Mayagüez (BS)
- Occupation: Municipal legislator, activist and surfer
- Website: Facebook
- Youngest elected individual in Puerto Rico

Edwin José Cornier Colón is a Puerto Rican politician, activist and surfer, who, as of April 2020, is a municipal legislator in Aguadilla, being the youngest elected individual in Puerto Rico.

== Biography ==
Cornier Colón was born on October 1, 2002, in Mayagüez, son of Harold Cornier, and engineer, and a mother who is a pharmacist. He has mentioned that since he was a child, especially from the 2012 elections, he has been interested in being part of politics and as a consequence of the government's response to Hurricane María and 2019 Puerto Rican protests, he was inspired in launching his candidacy under the Movimiento Victoria Ciudadana (Citizen's Victory Movement, MVC). He is also a surfer and practices standup paddleboarding, having been a member of Puerto Rico's national team and participating in international competitions. Additionally he is a "junior pro" in Flying Fish Board Co. Currently, he is completing a bachelor's degree in geology at the University of Puerto Rico at Mayagüez, though he has also expressed completing studies in political sciences. His intention is to at some moment become Aguadilla's mayor.

At only 17 years-old, announced his candidacy in December 2019 under the MVC and the following May, having graduated, he started his campaign visiting 1,000 homes. He has commented that the "pandemic worked in his favor since it was what allowed him the time to take walks and complete his studies without having to travel from Aguadilla to Mayagüez from Monday to Friday." He ran a mostly self-financed campaign, all donations upwards of $50.00 came from either himself or close relatives and these were the majority (68.14%) of the $1,111.70 collected funds.

In the 2020 general elections Cornier Colón, at the age of 18 year and 33 days of age and being the only candidate of the MVC in Aguadilla, was the recipient of 1,639 votes, becoming the youngest municipal legislator in Puerto Rico. Cornier Colón was one of 25 MVC-affiliated municipal legislators to be elected in November 2020. During a recount in Aguadilla, Cornier Colón, and by default the MVC, were able to retain their victory in the municipal legislature. His vote may be decisive, since the municipal legislature is composed of eight Partido Nuevo Progresista (New Progressive Party, PNP) members and seven Partido Popular Democrático (Popular Democratic Party, PPD) members, even though the inverse had previously been reported, with seven PNP and eight PPD.

Cornier Colón has mentioned that "he is willing to sit down and talk about [his] proposals" with the goal of creating alliances with the rest of the municipal legislators and take them to fruition. In the area of accountability and oversight, he has specified that "his strategy will be focused on making public municipal expenses". Other areas of Cornier Colón's areas of interest are the "local economy, community organizing and ecotourism." To revitalize the downtown area "[he will] promote [the idea] that city hall give tax exemptions to local businesspeople for at least the first $5,000 in sales" as long as they were located in the area. The ecotourism proposal was inspired a visit he made to Costa Rica where the industry "revenue was close to $40 million annually." Additionally, due to the alleged daily blackouts in Aguadilla, he intends to establish a municipal corporation to strengthen the electrical power lines.
