= 2024 San Juan, Puerto Rico, mayoral election =

- November 5, 2024
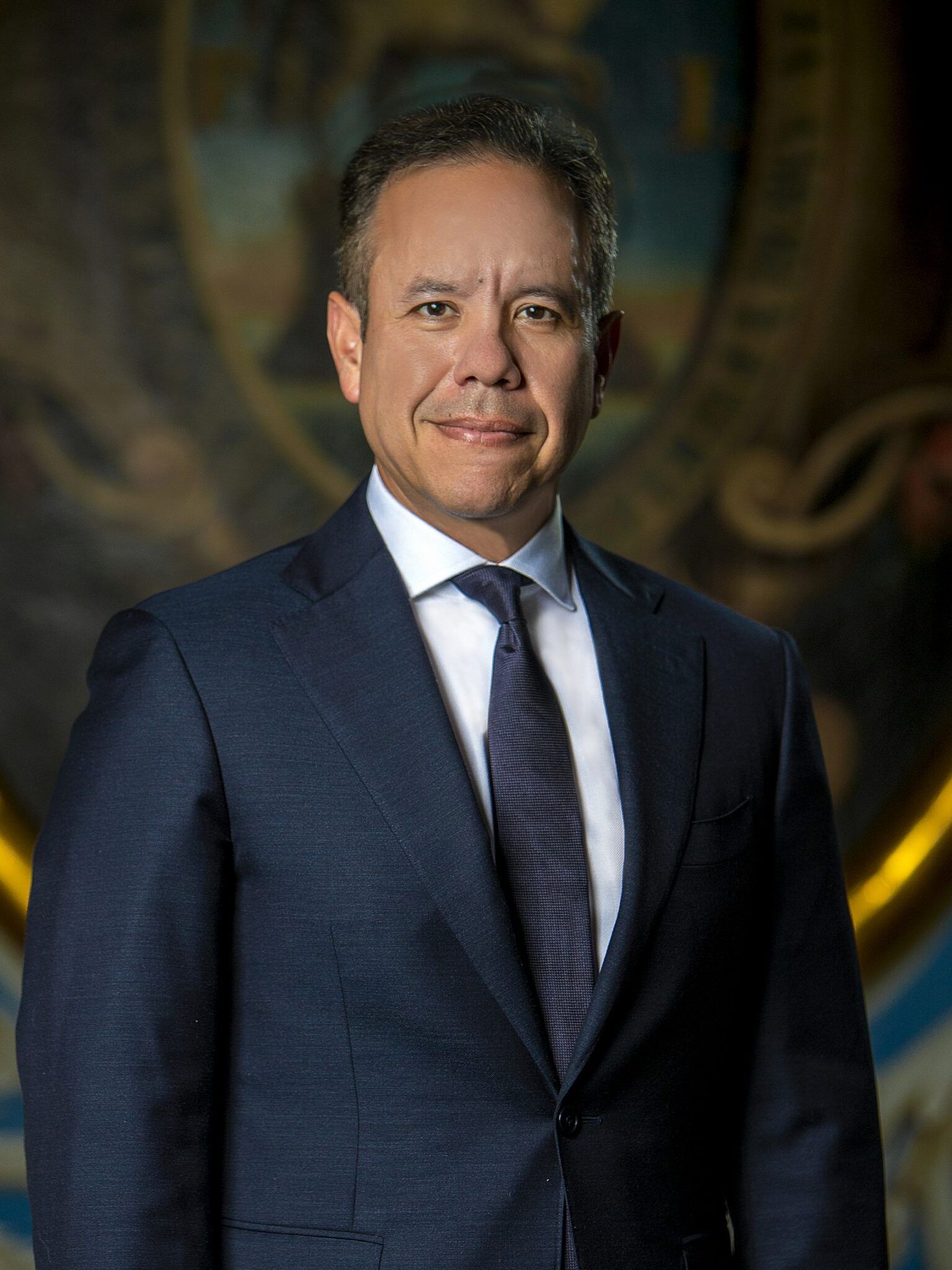

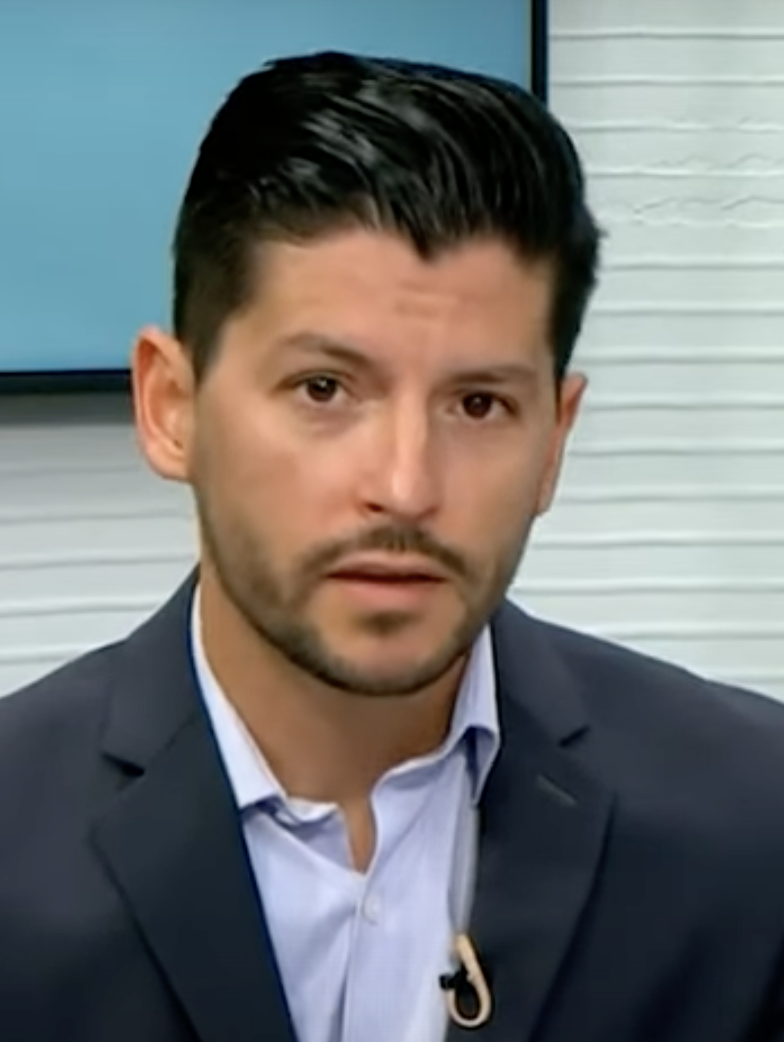

Nominee	Miguel Romero	Manuel Natal Albelo	Terestella Gonzalez Denton
Party	New Progressive	Citizens' Victory	Popular Democratic
Popular vote	57,039	42,962	12,825
Percentage	46.91%	40.33%	10.55%
Mayor before election
Miguel Romero
New Progressive
Elected mayor
Miguel Romero
New Progressive

San Juan, Puerto Rico, held an election for mayor on November 5, 2024. Among other elections, it was held concurrently with the 2024 Puerto Rico general election. It saw the re-election of New Progressive Party incumbent Miguel Romero.

== Nominations ==
=== New Progressive Party nomination ===
The New Progressive Party cancelled their primary, and re-nominated incumbent mayor Miguel Romero.

=== Popular Democratic Party nomination ===
The Popular Democratic Party cancelled their primary and nominated Terestella Gonzalez Denton.

=== Project Dignity nomination ===
Project Dignity cancelled their primary and nominated Maidalys Irizarry Villegas.

=== Citizen's Victory Movement nomination ===
The Citizen's Victory Movement cancelled their primary, and nominated Manuel Natal Albelo.

== General election ==
San Juan mayoral election results
Party	Candidate	Votes	%
New Progressive	Miguel Romero (incumbent)	57,039	46.91
Citizens' Victory	Manuel Natal Albelo	42,962	40.33
Popular Democratic	Terestella Gonzalez Denton	12,825	10.55
Project Dignity	Maidalys Irizarry Villegas	2,467	2.03
Independent	Jose Vargas Cruz	298	0.25
Total votes		121,586	100
