= 2000 San Juan, Puerto Rico, mayoral election =

- November 7, 2000
- Turnout: 79.34%
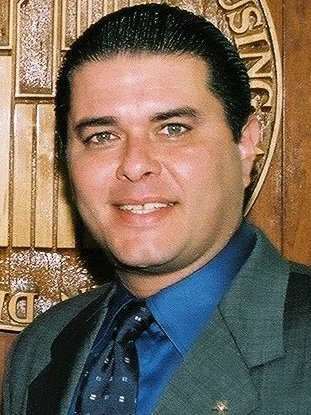

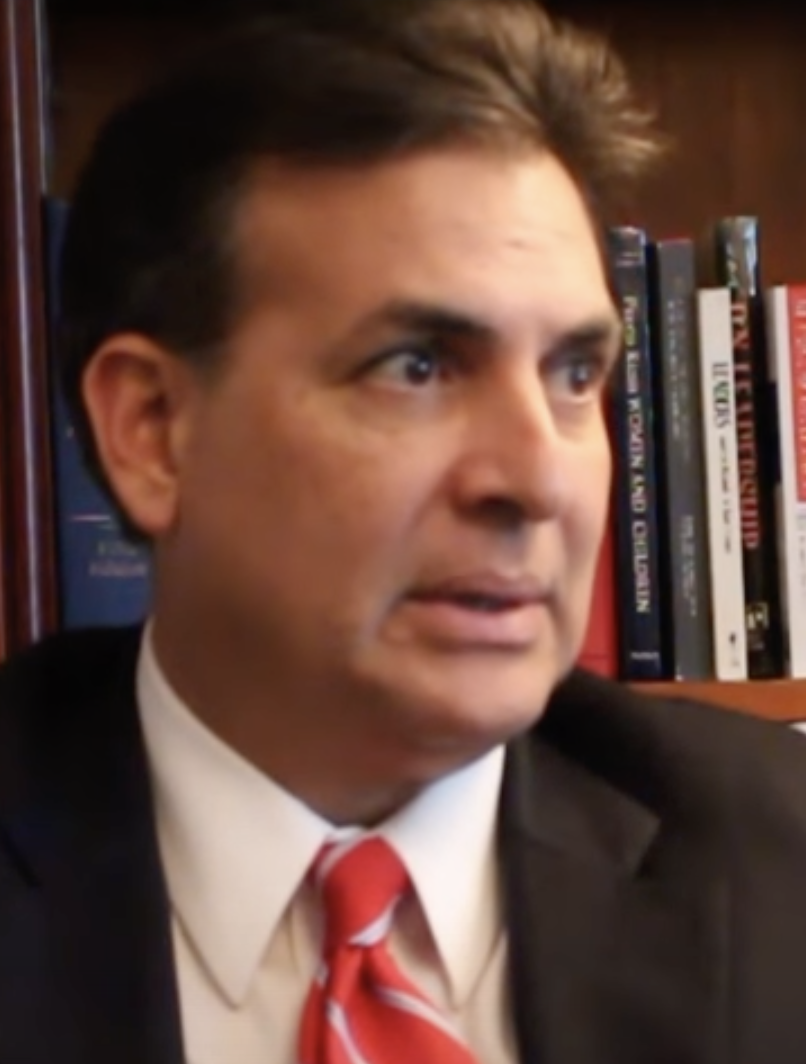

Nominee	Jorge Santini	Eduardo Bhatia	Vance Thomas
Party	New Progressive	Popular Democratic	Independence
Alliance		Democratic
Popular vote	101,012	97,383	10,753
Percentage	47.98%	46.26%	5.11%
Mayor before election
Sila María Calderón
Popular Democratic
Elected mayor
Jorge Santini
New Progressive

San Juan, Puerto Rico, held an election for mayor on November 7, 2000. It was held as part of the 2000 Puerto Rican general election. It saw the election of Jorge Santini, a member of the New Progressive Party.

Incumbent mayor Sila María Calderón, a member of the Popular Democratic Party, did not seek reelection to a second term, and instead ran for governor.

== Results ==
San Juan mayoral election
Party	Candidate	Votes	%
New Progressive	Jorge Santini	101,012	47.98
Popular Democratic	Eduardo Bhatia	97,383	46.26
Independence	Vance Thomas	10,753	5.11
Turnout		210,526	79.34
