= Briseida Torres Reyes =

Puerto Rican attorney and government official

Secretary of Labor and Human Resources of Puerto Rico
- In office May 20, 2019 – June 20, 2020
- Governor: Ricardo Rosselló
- Preceded by: Carlos Saavedra Gutiérrez
- Succeeded by: Carlos Rivera Santiago

Personal details
- Born: San Juan, Puerto Rico
- Education: University of Puerto Rico, Río Piedras Campus (BBA); University of Puerto Rico School of Law (JD)
- Occupation: Lawyer, government official

Briseida Torres Reyes is a Puerto Rican lawyer and government official serving as the Secretary of Labor and Human Resources of Puerto Rico. She was previously a judicial official of associate justice Luis Estrella Martínez.

== Education ==
Briseida Torres Reyes completed a Bachelor of Business Administration at the University of Puerto Rico, Río Piedras Campus. She completed a J.D. at the University of Puerto Rico School of Law.

== Career ==
Torres Reyes was an associate lawyer in a labor division at the law firm, O'Neill & Borges. She was a judicial official of the associate justice, Luis Estrella Martínez.

On May 20, 2019, Torres Reyes was appointed Secretary of Labor and Human Resources of Puerto Rico by Governor Ricardo Rosselló, succeeding incumbent secretary, Carlos Saavedra Gutiérrez.

On June 9, 2020, she announced her resignation as Secretary of Labor and Human Resources effective on June 15, 2020. She was succeeded by Carlos Rivera Santiago.
