= Rafael Bernabe Riefkohl =

Puerto Rican historian, sociologist, professor and politician

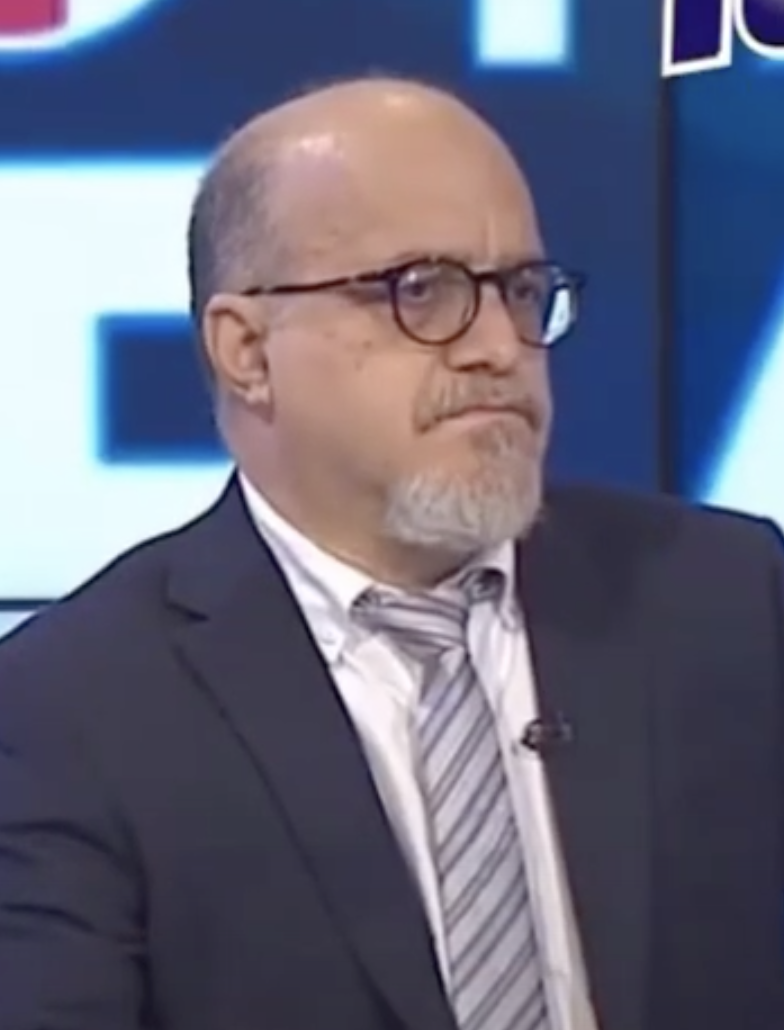
- Rafael Bernabe Riefkohl
- Born: 5 March 1959 (64 years old); Santurce, San Juan, Puerto Rico
- Education: Princeton University, State University of New York
- Occupations: Senator of Puerto Rico, Professor, former candidate for governor of Puerto Rico (2012, 2016)
- Political party: Citizens' Victory Movement

Rafael Bernabe Riefkohl (born 5 March 1959) is a Puerto Rican historian, sociologist, professor and politician who currently serves as a member of the Puerto Rico Senate representing the Citizens’ Victory Movement since 2021. He was the candidate for governor for the Working People's Party of Puerto Rico in 2012 and 2016. He has socialist beliefs and ideals, and is heavily critical of the New Progressive Party and Popular Democratic Party.

== Personal life ==
Bernabe was born in 1959, in the municipality of Santurce, Puerto Rico. He grew up in Río Piedras. He is Jewish.
