= Working People's Party (Puerto Rico) =

Puerto Rican political party

Working People's Party Partido del Pueblo Trabajador
- President: Anneliesse Sánchez Zambrana
- Spokesperson: Pedro Muñiz García
- Candidate for governor: Rafael Bernabe Riefkohl
- Founded: December 5, 2010; 14 years ago
- Dissolved: Late 2016
- Merged into: Citizens' Victory Movement (majority)
- Headquarters: Ave. Comerío, DD16, Río Hondo, Bayamón, Puerto Rico.
- Youth wing: Juventud PPT
- Ideology: Left-wing populism Democratic socialism Social justice Anti-colonialism
- Political position: Left-wing
- Colors: Purple

Website
- www.pueblotrabajador.com

The Working People's Party (Spanish: Partido del Pueblo Trabajador or PPT) was a Puerto Rican socialist political party. It was founded on December 5, 2010, in the city of San Juan, Puerto Rico, by a group of activists, students, teachers, professors, union workers, actors, and public and private employees. As of 2016, the party had no opinion on the issue of the political status of Puerto Rico, instead saying that they believe the decision should be made by the people of Puerto Rico in a referendum.

The party was de facto dissolved in late 2016 after opting not to renew its registration, with most of its members joining the Citizens' Victory Movement.

== Certification ==
The party worked to get the 100,000 endorsements required by the new electoral law of the Commonwealth in order to enroll with the Puerto Rico State Commission on Elections (CEE). On June 1, 2012, the CEE (Comisión Estatal de Elecciones) certified the PPT as an official party after getting the required number of endorsements.

== Electoral performance ==
The party's candidate for governor, Rafael Bernabe Riefkohl, obtained more than 17,000 votes in the November 6, 2012 election, turning the party into the fourth most-voted political force in that electoral event. Their campaign slogan was: "Para romper el cerco electoral, abre paso, vota PPT", which roughly translates as "To break the electoral barrier, take a step, vote PPT".

In 2016, Rafael Bernabe was once again the PPT candidate for governor. Mariana Nogales was the candidate for Resident Commissioner. Bernabe received 5,373 votes for governor (0.34% of the vote), finishing in 6th and last place. Nogales received 18,871 votes for resident commissioner (1.29% of the vote) and finished 4th.
