= Puerto Rico Department of Labor and Human Resources =

Government of Puerto Rico

- Departamento del Trabajo y Recursos Humanos de Puerto Rico
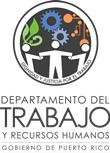

Department overview
- Formed: April 14, 1931; 95 years ago
- Jurisdiction: Executive Branch
- Headquarters: San Juan, PR
- Department executive: Carlos Rivera Santiago, Secretary
- Key documents: Law No. 15 of 1931; Article IV of the Constitution of Puerto Rico; Law No. 100 of 1977; Reorganization Plan No. 3 of 1994
- Website: www.trabajo.pr.gov

The Puerto Rico Department of Labor and Human Resources (PRDLHR) (Spanish: Departamento del Trabajo y Recursos Humanos de Puerto Rico) is an executive department of the government of Puerto Rico. The DLHR is responsible for setting and implementing public policy in the areas of labor relations, occupational safety, unemployment insurance benefits, re-employment services, and human resources training in the U.S. Commonwealth of Puerto Rico. The Department is also responsible for some economic statistics.

== History ==
The department is an executive department of the Government of Puerto Rico. It was created in 1931 but only gained formal recognition when the Constitution of the Commonwealth of Puerto Rico was approved in 1952. Its first secretary was Prudencio Rivera. The incumbent is Carlos Saavedra Gutiérrez.
