= Secretary of Labor and Human Resources of Puerto Rico =

Executive branch of Puerto Rico

- Incumbent; Carlos Rivera Santiago since June 9, 2020; 6 years ago
- Department of Labor and Human Resources
- Nominator: Governor
- Appointer: Governor with advice and consent from the Senate
- Term length: 4 years
- Formation: Established by Law No. 15 of 1931
- Succession: Fifth
- Website: www.dtrh.gobierno.pr

The Secretary of Labor and Human Resources of Puerto Rico is responsible for the development and management of all matters related to labor and human resources in the government of Puerto Rico. The secretary heads the Department of Labor and Human Resources.

== Former holders ==
- Prudencio Rivera Martinez (1930s)
- Julia Rivera de Vicenti
- Manuel A. Pérez
- Miguel Romero
- Carlos Saavedra Gutiérrez
- Vance Thomas
- Ruy Delgado Zayas
- María del Pilar Vélez-Casanova
