= Jackson Lewis =

Law firm

Jackson Lewis P.C.
- Headquarters: New York
- No. of offices: 61
- No. of attorneys: Over 1125
- Major practice areas: Labor and Employment
- Key people: Kevin G. Lauri (Firm Chair) Samantha N. Hoffman (Firm Managing Principal)
- Revenue: ▲US$486.1 million (2020)
- Profit per equity partner: $634,000 (2020)
- Date founded: 1958
- Company type: Professional Corporation
- Website: www.jacksonlewis.com

Jackson Lewis P.C. is an American law firm that specializes in labor and employment law and assisting companies in facilitating immigration. It has a reputation as one of the top U.S. union-busting practices.

Jackson Lewis is organized into 20 practice groups and 19 industry groups. The majority of these groups are focused on labor and employment law, but the firm also has expertise in healthcare and collegiate and professional sports law. Practice and industry group members are spread across all of the firm's offices. The firm has over 1125 attorneys and 61 offices, including its Puerto Rico office. The firm is a founding member of L&E Global Employers' Counsel Worldwide, an alliance of workplace law firms in 20 countries. The firm is led by a board of directors, and its current chair is Kevin G. Lauri.

== History ==
Jackson Lewis was founded by Lou Jackson and Robert Lewis in 1958. The firm's first office was opened in New York City in 1958. It opened its second office in Los Angeles in 1977. The firm's period of most rapid growth was between 2006 and 2015. In 2013, Jackson Lewis opened its first office outside of the continental US in San Juan, Puerto Rico.

In 2018, the firm partnered with ROSS Intelligence to use its legal research AI.

== Union avoidance ==
Jackson Lewis is one of the four largest management-side union avoidance law firms in the United States, and has been "retained to offer legal advice to many employers who have succeeded in winning NLRB elections or in averting union elections altogether." The firm has represented thousands of employers in National Labor Relations Board (NLRB) cases and in 2024 accounted for 3.6% of all NLRB case share with an estimated revenue of $49.6 million dollars from employer representation according to the Economic Policy Institute. In 1971, Jackson Lewis partners published the book "Winning NLRB elections: Avoiding unionization through preventive employee relations programs", a foundational handbook for successful prevention of unionization in workplaces. In 2011, the firm formed the L&E Global Alliance with five Europe-based management-side labor firms, offering specialization in cross-border corporate union campaign services on 6 continents in 25 jurisdictions.

=== EnerSys anti-union campaign and lawsuit ===
In the 1990s and 2000s, Jackson Lewis received media attention after a protracted anti-union campaign on behalf of EnerSys, a battery manufacturing company in South Carolina. The company retained Jackson Lewis in 1994 to lead an anti-union campaign after workers petitioned for unionization. After a protracted 8-year campaign delaying recognition and eventually de-recognizing the union, EnerSys was accused of 120 violations by the NLRB, including charges of firing union leaders, spying on workers, and closing parts of the factory in retaliation. The company paid $7.75 million dollars to the NLRB, and in turn sued Jackson Lewis for malpractice and "engineering 'a relentless and unlawful campaign to oust the union.'" Jackson Lewis, in turn, accused EnerSys of attempting to avoid payment to the law firm, to which it owed $270,000 in legal fees. The case between EnerSys and Jackson Lewis was settled outside of court in 2004.

=== Other anti-union campaigns ===
Jackson Lewis represented AT&T/NCR in an aggressive cross-state anti-union campaign in the early 1990s. More recently, in the 2010s and 2020s, the firm has attracted media attention for representing higher education institutions against union efforts by faculty and graduate students, such at the University of New Mexico, University of New Hampshire, Barnard College, and Howard University.

== Practice groups ==
Jackson Lewis' practice groups include:

- Advice and Counsel
- Affirmative Action, OFCCP and Government Contract Compliance
- Class Actions and Complex Litigation
- Collegiate and Professional Sports
- Corporate Diversity Counseling
- Corporate Governance and Internal Investigations
- Disability, Leave and Health Management
- Employee Benefits
- ERISA Complex Litigation
- Immigration
- International Employment
- Labor Relations
- Litigation
- Privacy, Data and Cybersecurity
- Restrictive Covenants, Trade Secrets and Unfair Competition
- Trials and Appeals
- Wage and Hour
- White Collar and Government Enforcement
- Workplace Safety and Health
- Workplace Training

== Awards ==
In part for its role in creating "workthruIT", a web-based, self-service labor and employment law compliance application, Jackson Lewis was recognized as the "2018 Innovative Law Firm of the Year" by the International Legal Technology Association (ILTA).
