= Movimiento Victoria Ciudadana =

Puerto Rican political party

Citizens' Victory Movement Movimiento Victoria Ciudadana
- Chief coordinator: Eva Prados
- Founded: March 11, 2019; 7 years ago
- Headquarters: San Juan, Puerto Rico
- Youth wing: La Jota MVC
- Ideology: Anti-colonialism; Anti-corruption; Anti-neoliberalism; Environmentalism; Progressivism; Social democracy
- Political position: Left-wing
- National affiliation: Alianza de País
- Colors: Gold; Black
- Seats in the Senate: 0 / 27
- Seats in the House of Representatives: 0 / 51
- Municipalities (Mayors): 0 / 78
- Seats in the U.S. House: 0 / 1

Website
- www.mvc.pr

Movimiento Victoria Ciudadana (English: Citizens' Victory Movement, generally abbreviated as MVC) is a Puerto Rican political party founded in 2019. It ran in the 2020 and 2024 Puerto Rican general elections on an anti-colonial platform, proposing a constitutional assembly to determine a final decision regarding the relationship between the United States and Puerto Rico.

== History ==
The Movimiento Victoria Ciudadana was a result of an attempt by some minority parties, such as the Movimiento Unión Soberanista (MUS) and the Working People's Party (PPT), political organizations, namely the Hostosian National Independence Movement (MINH), and other prominent political figures, to establish a "broad front", with conversations predating Hurricane Maria. Notable individuals who advocated for its formation were Ana Irma Rivera Lassén, former-president of the Bar Association of Puerto Rico, then-independent Representative, Manuel Natal Albelo, Claridad-publisher and urban planner José "Tato" Rivera Santana, and union leader Roberto Pagán. Additionally, early proponents included former-gubernatorial candidates, who were Alexandra Lúgaro, who ran under an independent ticket in the 2016 Puerto Rico gubernatorial election, receiving 11.13% of votes, and Rafael Bernabe Riefkohl, who ran in the 2012 and 2016 gubernatorial elections, running under the PPT and receiving 0.098% and 0.034% votes, respectively.

On Tuesday, March 5, 2019, Rivera Lassén, registered the party logo as well as the intention of forming a new party at the Puerto Rico State Commission on Elections. Rivera Lassén submitted the sworn declaration, however, the domain name was registered by a company incorporated by Lúgaro and her mother. When made public, the party logo generated controversy, due to its similarity to the one used by the United Socialist Party of Venezuela. Afterwards, the social media accounts of people linked, most of whom hailed from the independence and sovereign movements, to the party started replacing the logo on their social media's profile pictures. The announcement of the formation of the party was welcomed by then-Governor of Puerto Rico, Ricardo Rosselló, in stark contrast with then-President of the Popular Democratic Party (PPD), Aníbal José Torres, who had previously stated that the PPD was the only party that could "face the "monster" of the [PNP]." Nevertheless, early on, the MVC had not made public which individuals would be chosen as future candidates for the 2020 elections, instead concentrating on collecting the close to sixty-thousand signatures needed to become a registered party. Early supporters, who tended to publish the party logo on their social media as an expression of their endorsement, included Larry Emil Alicea Rodríguez, former-president of the Puerto Rico Professional Social Workers College, lawyer and 2016 PPT candidate for Resident Commissioner Mariana Nogales Molinelli, as well as political sciences professor and author, Manuel S. Almeida.

External videos
- Lanzamiento del Movimiento Victoria Ciudadana [Launch of the Citizen Victory Movement] (11-mar-2019) on Facebook

Prior to the constituting assembly, PNP representative Jorge "Georgie" Navarro Alicea, alleged that then-mayor of San Juan, Carmen Yulín Cruz (PPD), "would mobilize municipal resources and employees [that] night" to the assembly, to be held at the Teatro Tapia, owned by the municipal government of San Juan. Yulín Cruz, who had been strongly suspected of her intent to join the MVC, inquired at what time he had stated that and if he was in a drunken state. Additionally, she confirmed that she had accepted meetings with the MVC and expressed her support for new political movements, even though she would not be joining them.

At an assembly held at 7:00 p.m. in the Teatro Tapia in Old San Juan on Monday, March 11, 2019, the party was founded. The ceremony, which was moderated by Rivera Lassen, was standing-room only and some people had to be left out. The doors opened at 6:30 p.m., and the queue "extended beyond the sidewalk." Attendees received a document titled "Citizen Victory Urgent Agenda", which included part of the party platform and a summary of the purpose of the party. After the ceremony, in which Rivera Lassen and Lúgaro on stage, the leaders of the newly-formed party, which included Bernabe Riefkhol, Natal Albelo, held a press conference, in which Lúgaro rejected the idea of a "wasted vote," with Rivera Lassen stating that "[a] vote for [MVC] is a vote for the future of Puerto Rico" and Natal Albelo commenting that "in this movement, the action counts, not the reaction."

At its founding assembly, the party platform stated that the MVC was founded "to attend to three urgent duties of our time:" fighting corruption and restoring Puerto Rico's governmental institutions; promoting social, economic, and fiscal reconstruction; and decolonization of Puerto Rico. MVC also calls for a constitutional assembly to choose a decolonization plan that results in statehood, full independence, or a free association status with the United States. In economic terms, the party's platform known as the "Urgent Agenda" places emphasis on strengthening labor rights and opposing privatization. The 2019 Telegramgate scandal that implicated the ruling New Progressive Party helped define the focus of the MVC on government reform.

== Officials ==
=== Senate ===
- Rafael Bernabe Riefkohl (2021–2025)
- Ana Irma Rivera Lassén (2021–2025)

=== Representatives ===
- José Bernardo Márquez (2021–2025)
- Mariana Nogales Molinelli (2021–2025)

=== Founding members ===
- Rafael Bernabe Riefkohl, historian and 2016 PPT candidate for governor
- Edwin Cornier Colón, Aguadillan municipal legislator and youngest elected individual in Puerto Rico
- Alexandra Lúgaro, lawyer, 2016 and 2020 candidate for governor (2016 as an independent)
- Mariana Nogales Molinelli, lawyer and 2016 PPT candidate for resident commissioner
- Ana Irma Rivera Lassén, former head of the Bar Association of Puerto Rico
- Manuel Natal Albelo, former member of the Partido Popular Democratico and former representative in the 29th House of Representatives of Puerto Rico

== Election results ==
=== Governor Election Results ===
| Year | Candidate | Votes | % | +/- | Result |
|---|---|---|---|---|---|
| 2020 | Alexandra Lúgaro Aponte | 175,583 | 14.21 / 100 | ▲3.08% | 3rd |
| 2024 | Javier Córdova Iturregui (paper candidate) | 1,522 | 0.12 / 100 | ▼14.09% | 5th |

=== Resident Commissioner Election Results ===
| Year | Candidate | Votes | % | +/- | Result |
|---|---|---|---|---|---|
| 2020 | Zayira Jordán Conde | 154,751 | 12.89 / 100 | ▲12.89% | 3rd |
| 2024 | Ana Irma Rivera Lassén | 115,710 | 9.48 / 100 | ▼3.41% | 3rd |

=== Legislative Elections ===
House of Representatives
| Year | Seats | +/– |
|---|---|---|
| 2020 | 2 / 51 | ▲2 |
| 2024 | 0 / 51 | ▼2 |

Senate
| Year | Seats | +/– |
|---|---|---|
| 2020 | 2 / 27 | ▲2 |
| 2024 | 0 / 27 | ▼2 |
