= Miguel Romero =

Puerto Rican lawyer and politician (born 1970)

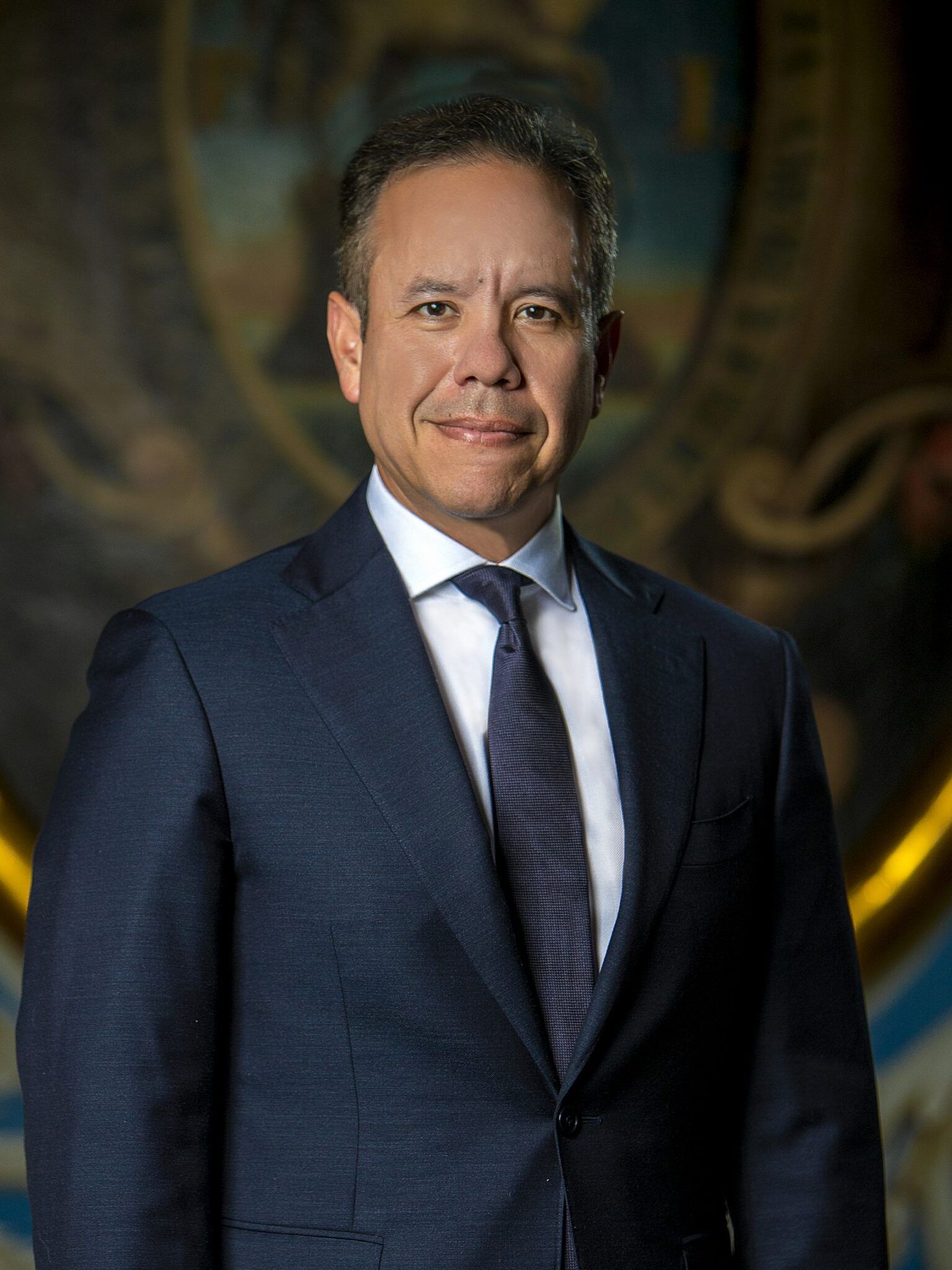
- Official portrait, 2021

Mayor of San Juan
- Incumbent
- Assumed office January 11, 2021
- Preceded by: Carmen Yulín Cruz

Member of the Puerto Rico Senate from the 1st district
- In office January 2, 2017 – January 1, 2021
- Preceded by: Ramón Luis Nieves; José Nadal Power
- Succeeded by: Nitza Morán

Chief of Staff of Puerto Rico
- In office August 1, 2012 – January 1, 2013
- Governor: Luis Fortuño
- Preceded by: Marcos Rodriguez Ema
- Succeeded by: Ingrid Vila Biaggi

Secretary of Labor and Human Resources of Puerto Rico
- In office January 12, 2009 – January 13, 2013
- Governor: Luis Fortuño
- Succeeded by: Vance Thomas

Personal details
- Born: Miguel Alberto Romero Lugo; February 17, 1970 (age 56) San Juan, Puerto Rico
- Party: New Progressive
- Other political affiliations: Democratic
- Education: University of Puerto Rico, Río Piedras (BA); Interamerican University of Puerto Rico (JD)

Miguel Alberto Romero Lugo (born February 17, 1970) is a Puerto Rican lawyer, who is the current Mayor of San Juan. He was also Secretary of Labor and Human Resources of Puerto Rico (2009–2012) and former Chief of Staff of Puerto Rico during Governor Luis Fortuño's administration (2012–2013) and senator for the San Juan District (2017–2020).

== Early life and education ==
Romero was born on February 17, 1970, in San Juan, Puerto Rico. At the age of 17, he was admitted to the University of Puerto Rico where he pursue a Bachelor of Arts in Social Science. While going to college, he also attended hospitality school where he learned the skills he would later use in his union job as a casino croupier, a position that provided his first exposure to collective bargaining agreements.

Later, in 1999, he obtained a J.D. degree from the Inter American University of Puerto Rico School of Law, where he graduated summa cum laude and top in his class. After graduation, he obtained the highest grade (100%) in the PR Bar Exam. Romero Lugo was also admitted to practice law in the state of Florida, the Federal Court in Puerto Rico, the Central Florida Federal Court and the Supreme Court of the United States.

== Early career ==
He joined the Government of Puerto Rico in 1993, working for the Youth Affairs Office. Then he moved up to La Fortaleza – the Governor's Mansion – where he worked in the Municipal Affairs Office during the day, while earning a J.D. degree from the Interamerican University of Puerto Rico School of Law in the evenings.

In 1998, then-Governor Pedro Rosselló nominated Romero as associate member of the Appellate Board of the government's personnel administration system. Two years later, he was designated president of that entity, serving in that capacity until 2004, being the youngest member of the cabinet at the time of his nomination. Romero then practiced as a private trial lawyer, specializing in labor relations.

== Secretary of Labor and Human Resources ==
In November 2008, former Governor of Puerto Rico, Hon. Luis Fortuño, nominated him as Secretary of Labor and Human Resources. He was sworn into his post in January 2009, and assumed several responsibilities that denote his leadership, character and commitment as a public servant. Romero successfully mediated disputes and spearheaded many negotiations with Labor Unions improving the conditions of Puerto Rico's workforce.

While being in office Romero was active in several Government of Puerto Rico boards, including the State Insurance Fund Corporation, the Public Housing Administration, the Cooperative Development Commission, the Work Investment Act State Board, and the Fiscal and Economic Stabilization board. Additionally, he was one of only five government officials that make up the council in charge of reorganizing and modernizing the Executive Branch of Puerto Rico. Because of his leadership the Governor of Puerto Rico also entrusted Romero with the task of solving all current tribulations affecting the government's retirement system by naming him chair of the Commission to Reform the Government of Puerto Rico Retirement Systems.

In August 2012, Romero was appointed chief of staff by Governor Fortuño.

== Chief of Staff of Puerto Rico ==
On August 1, 2012, Romero became the Governor's third Chief of Staff, succeeding Marcos Rodríguez Ema, who became one of Senior Advisor to the Luis Fortuño reelection campaign. The differences in style with his predecessor became readily apparent when he announced that he will concentrate on government issues and avoid becoming immersed in political debate.

== National politics ==
Romero, a Democrat, served as a delegate to the 2012 Democratic National Convention in Charlotte, North Carolina, representing the San Juan Senatorial District. In 2016, he also served as a delegate for the 2016 Democratic National Convention in Philadelphia Pennsylvania, representing the San Juan Senatorial District.

== Tenure as Mayor ==
After four years in the Senate of Puerto Rico, in 2020, the people of San Juan elected him as the mayor of the Municipality of San Juan. On January 11, 2021, he took office, becoming the eighth mayor of San Juan elected by the direct vote of the people of San Juan.

Political offices
Preceded by Carmen Yulín Cruz	Mayor of San Juan; 2021–present	Incumbent
