= Ramón Luis Cruz =

Puerto Rican politician

Ramón Luis Cruz-Burgos

Member of the Puerto Rico House of Representatives from the 34th District
- In office January 2, 2013 – December 31, 2024
- Preceded by: Cristóbal Colón Ruiz
- Succeeded by: Christian Muriel

Chairman, Transportation, Infrastructure, Recreation and Sports Committee

Chairman, Joint Committee on Legislative Internships

Personal details
- Born: September 27, 1985 (age 40) Humacao, Puerto Rico
- Party: Popular Democratic Party (PPD)
- Education: University of Puerto Rico at Humacao (BA)
- Profession: Businessman

Ramón Luis Cruz Burgos (born September 27, 1985) is a Puerto Rican politician affiliated with the Popular Democratic Party (PPD). Cruz Burgos studied in Manuel Ortiz Elementary School and attended Luis Muñoz-Marín High School in Yabucoa, Puerto Rico. He completed a Bachelor's Degree in Physics Applied to Electronics from the University of Puerto Rico at Humacao. He represented Puerto Rico in several national competitions at NASA, including three times in the Great Moonbuggy Race.

As a student, he worked at Farmacias Feliciano in Yabucoa as a technician and was in charge of the delivery system of medicines to patient homes. Then he became a businessman, opening a local gym in Yabucoa. At 27, he has been a public servant for several years. He was a legislative aide at the minority leader's office in the Senate, and the minority leader of the legislative assembly in his hometown of Yabucoa.

He was elected to the Puerto Rico House of Representatives on November 6, 2012, to represent District 34, that includes the municipalities of Maunabo, Patillas and Yabucoa, Puerto Rico and parts of San Lorenzo. Since January 2, 2013, he has been focusing on his job as chairman of the House of Representatives’ Transportation, Infrastructure, Sports and Recreations Committee, and of the Joint Committee of the Legislative Assembly for Students Internships. Cruz-Burgos, as one of the youngest members of the legislative assembly, served for a brief period as chairman of the Youth Affairs Committee of the House of Representatives of the Commonwealth of Puerto Rico.

House of Representatives of Puerto Rico
Preceded by Cristóbal Colón Ruiz	Member of the Puerto Rico House of Representatives from the 34th district 2013–2024	Succeeded by Christian Muriel
Preceded by Carlos Johnny Méndez	Minority Whip of the Puerto Rico House of Representatives; 2017–2021	Succeeded by Gabriel Rodríguez Aguiló
