= Idalia Ramos (physicist) =

Puerto Rican physicist and nanoscientist

- Born: March 1, 1960 (age 66); Barranquitas, Puerto Rico
- Education: University of Puerto Rico (BS); University of Pennsylvania (MS); Purdue University (MS)
- Website: http://mate.uprh.edu/~iramos/

Idalia Ramos Colón is a Puerto Rican physicist and nanoscientist, and a professor of physics and electronics at the University of Puerto Rico at Humacao, where she directs the National Science Foundation Partnership for Research and Education in Materials (PREM) for Advancing Device Innovation through Inclusive Research and Education. Her research involves using electrospinning to synthesize and study the physical and electronic properties of microfibers and nanofibers, and the applications of these fibers as gas sensors.

== Education and career ==
Ramos was born near Barranquitas, Puerto Rico in a family of educators, and attended high school in Barranquitas. She studied physics as an undergraduate at the University of Puerto Rico, Río Piedras Campus, working there with Jorge J. Santiago-Aviles. Santiago moved to the University of Pennsylvania in the 1980s, and brought Ramos with him as a graduate student. She earned a master's degree in electrical engineering at the University of Pennsylvania in 1987. She went on for further graduate study in physics at Purdue University, leaving with a master's degree in 1992.

Since 1993 she has been on the faculty at University of Puerto Rico at Humacao, where her student experience as the only woman in her classes inspired her to provide more opportunities for other women in physics. She has been collaborating with the University of Pennsylvania on a project in physics education, first as a Collaborative to Integrate Research and Education (CIRE) project from 1999 to 2004, and subsequently through the National Science Foundation Partnership for Research and Education in Materials (PREM).

== Recognition ==
Ramos was named as a Fellow of the American Physical Society (APS) in 2019, after a nomination from the APS Forum on Education, "for tireless work on behalf of physics students, especially Hispanic women, and for enthusiasm for research that has inspired generations of many Puerto Rican students to enter physics graduate programs".
