= Cristóbal Colón Ruiz =

Puerto Rican politician (born 1954)

Cristóbal Colón Ruíz

Member of the Puerto Rico House of Representatives from the 34th District
- In office January 2, 2001 – January 2, 2013
- Preceded by: Angel García de Jesús
- Succeeded by: Ramón Luis Cruz

Member of the Municipal Assembly of Yabucoa
- In office January 2, 1992 – January 1, 2001

Personal details
- Born: October 4, 1954 (age 71) Yabucoa, Puerto Rico
- Party: New Progressive Party (NPP)
- Spouse: Dominga Muñoz Lozada
- Children: Marilyn; Grisela; Cristóbal

Cristóbal Colón Ruíz (born October 4, 1954) is a Puerto Rican politician affiliated with the New Progressive Party (NPP). He was a member of the Puerto Rico House of Representatives from 2001 to 2011 representing District 34.

== Early years and studies ==
Cristóbal Colón Ruiz was born on the Barrio Guayabota of Yabucoa on October 4, 1954. He completed his elementary and high school studies in his hometown, graduating from the Teodoro Aguilar Mora Vocational High School. While a student, Colón distinguished himself as a baseball player.

== Professional career ==
After graduating, Colón worked as a farmer. In 1991 the farmer's association chose him as farmer of the year.

== Political career ==
Colón began his political career in 1992, when he was elected as member of the Municipal Assembly of Yabucoa. He also served as majority speaker within the body. He was reelected in 1996.

In 2000, Colón was elected to the House of Representatives of Puerto Rico, representing District 34. He was reelected twice (2004 and 2008).

In 2011, Colón did not bid for a reelection to the House of Representatives, to run for mayor of Patillas. However, he was defeated by Norberto Soto (from the PPD) at the 2012 general election.

== Personal life ==
Colón is married to Dominga Muñoz Lozada. They have three children together: Marilyn, Grisela, and Cristóbal.
