= Pedro González Ramos =

Puerto Rican academic administrator (1935–2023)

Pedro Gonzalez Ramos
- Born: Pedro Antonio Gonzalez Ramos; 14 May 1935; Mayagüez, Puerto Rico
- Died: 26 May 2023 (aged 88); San Juan, Puerto Rico
- Education: University of Puerto Rico at Mayagüez (BA, MS); Fordham University (PhD)
- Occupations: Academic administrator, doctor, educator

Pedro Antonio Gonzalez Ramos (14 May 1935 – 26 May 2023) was a Puerto Rican academic administrator, doctor and educator.

He graduated with a Bachelor in Biology and a Master of Science from the University of Puerto Rico at Mayagüez. Earned Doctor of Philosophy in Biology from Fordham University. There he joined in 1953 the Beta chapter of Phi Sigma Alpha fraternity.

He was the second Dean of the University of Puerto Rico at Humacao from 1960 to 1972.

He was president of the Puerto Rico Telephone Company and radio station WKAQ (AM).

He was the President of Universidad del Sagrado Corazón from 1972 to 1986. Under his presidency new academic programs were added such as natural Sciences, Business and communications. The Dolphin was chosen as the university mascot and Sagrado joined Liga Atlética Interuniversitaria (LAI), he coordinated the visit of Pope John Paul II to the campus. On March 23, 2023, Sagrado Corazón bestowed upon him their first Distinguished Service award, which be henceforth be named in his honor.
