= Angel García de Jesús =

Puerto Rican politician

Mayor of Yabucoa
- In office January 14, 2001 – January 13, 2013
- Preceded by: Angel Ramos Alveiro
- Succeeded by: Rafael Surillo

Member of the Puerto Rico House of Representatives from the 34th District
- In office January 2, 1993 – January 2, 2001
- Preceded by: Reinado Pirela
- Succeeded by: Cristóbal Colón Ruiz

Personal details
- Born: Yabucoa, Puerto Rico
- Party: New Progressive Party (PNP)

Angel "Papo" García de Jesús is a Puerto Rican politician who served as a member of the Puerto Rico House of Representatives at the 34th District later as Mayor of Yabucoa. García is affiliated with the New Progressive Party (PNP) and served as mayor from 2001 to 2013. Hes also been a political annalist at radio station WXEW.

House of Representatives of Puerto Rico
Preceded by Reinado Pirela	Member of the Puerto Rico House of Representatives from the 34th District; 1993-2001	Succeeded by Cristóbal Colón Ruiz
Political offices
Preceded by Angel Ramos Alveiro	Mayor of Yabucoa, Puerto Rico; 2001-2013	Succeeded by Rafael Surillo
