= NASA Human Exploration Rover Challenge =

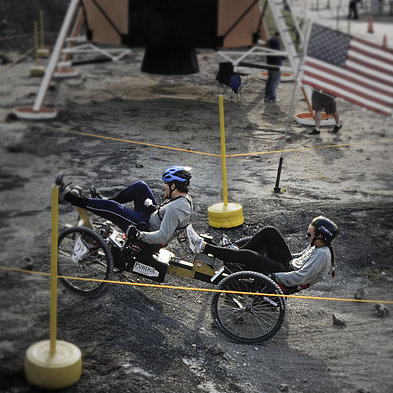
Students traverse a simulated crater in a moonbuggy they designed and built themselves.

The NASA Human Exploration Rover Challenge, prior to 2014 referred to as the Great Moonbuggy Race, is an annual competition for high school and college students to design, build, and race human-powered, collapsible vehicles over simulated lunar/Martian terrain. NASA sponsors the competition, first held in 1994, and, since 1996, the U.S. Space & Rocket Center hosts.

Students created vehicles dubbed "moonbuggies" to face challenges similar to those engineers at NASA's Marshall Space Flight Center addressed in preparation for Apollo 15. On that mission, on July 31, 1971, the first Lunar Roving Vehicle extended the range of astronauts on the Moon to allow for further exploration than was otherwise possible. Two other rovers were sent to the Moon on subsequent missions.

With the 2014 changes in the contest, the motivation changed to mimicking design challenges faced by engineers designing rovers for future exploration missions to a variety of celestial bodies.

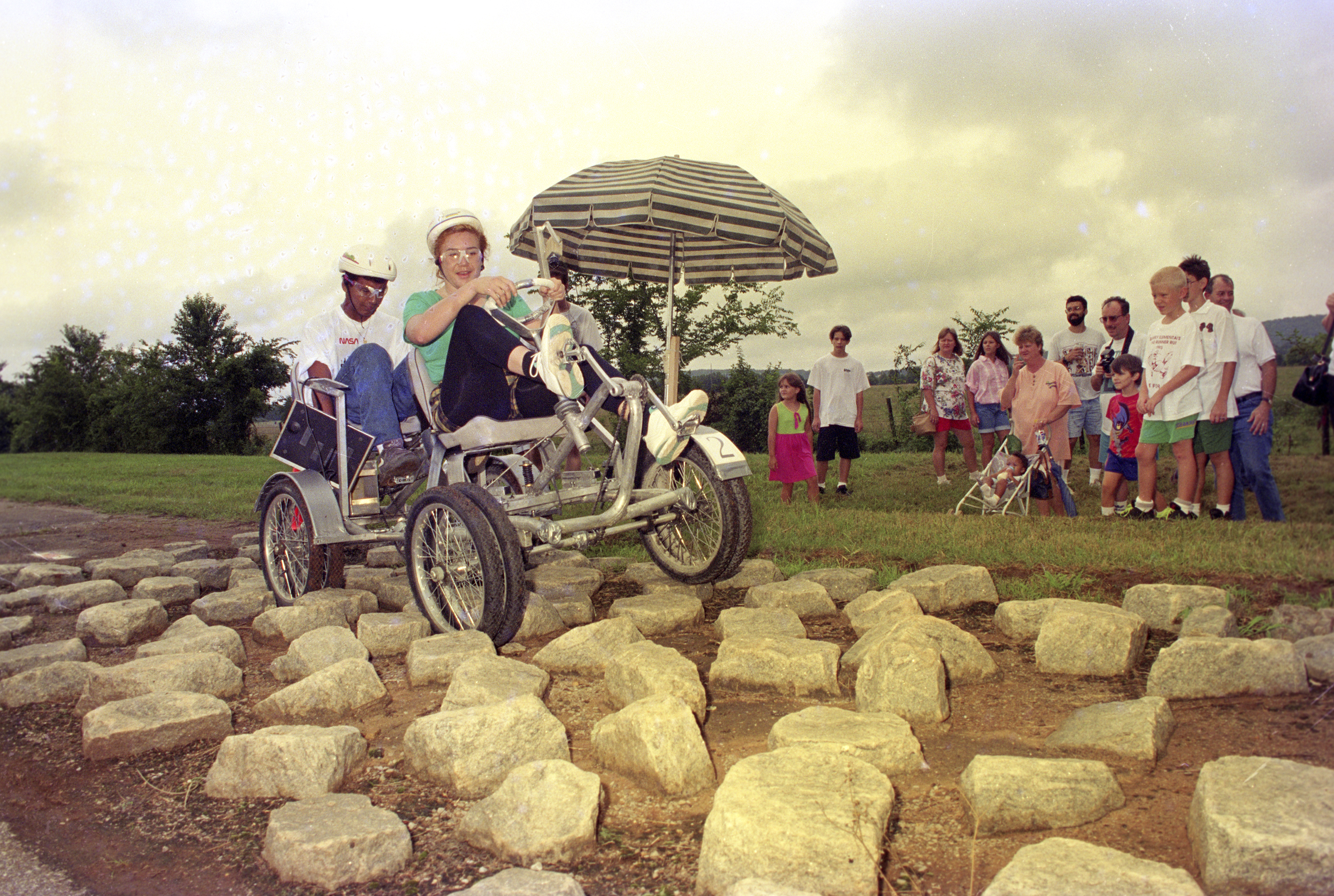
The first two events were held at the original track used for testing lunar rover candidates. Here, the team from Puerto Rico navigates boulders.

The first race, in 1994, was held on July 16, the 25th anniversary of the Apollo 11 launch. It featured six college teams who competed on the same course as had been used to test the lunar rovers previously. The University of New Hampshire finished first, in 18 minutes 55 seconds for the 1.4-mile (2.3 km) course with twelve obstacles. The prize was a trip for six team members to see a Space Shuttle launch. Other teams from the University of Puerto Rico at Humacao, Texas A & M University, the University of Alabama in Huntsville, Georgia Institute of Technology and Indiana University/Purdue University at Indianapolis participated.

Subsequent races have been held in April. In 1996, the competition was moved to a .75-mile (1.21 km) course at the U.S. Space & Rocket Center; high school teams also began competing.

== Rules ==
The rules change year by year, but are largely summarized thus:

- A team of at most six people designs, builds, and races the same vehicle.
- Two of the six must ride and propel the vehicle through the course.
- Riders must be one male and one female.
- The moonbuggy (pre-2014) must fit into a 4-foot (1.2 m) cube and be no more than 4 ft wide. Beginning in 2014, the rover constraint was a 5-foot (1.5 m) cube.
- The vehicle needs to carry a simulated high-gain antenna, camera, and other instrumentation which must consume at least 1 cubic foot (28 L).
- Various other dimensional and safety criteria apply.
- Time penalties are assessed for touching the ground, avoiding obstacles, and other rule violations.
- Since 2016, the teams have to design and fabricate their own non-pneumatic tires/wheels. Purchasing a commercially available product will lead to disqualification.

== Course ==
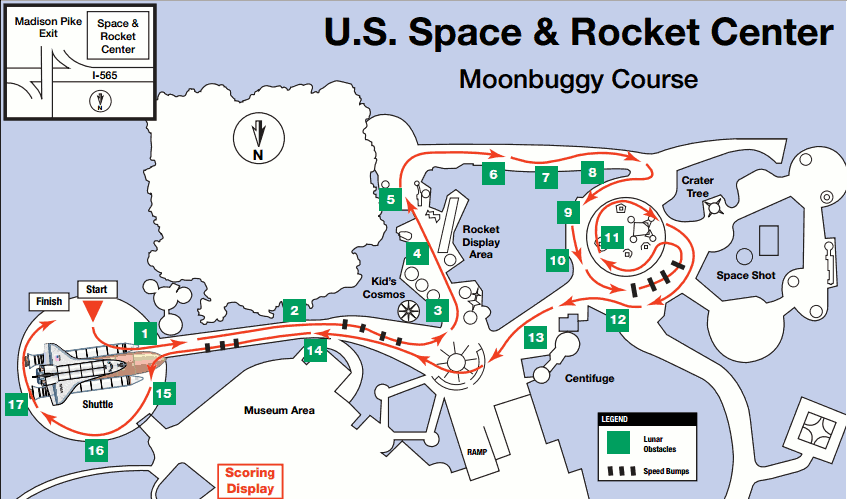
Since 1996, the course winds through the rocket park at the U.S. Space & Rocket Center in Huntsville, Alabama. This map shows the 2012 course.

The course is designed to test rovers for stability over varying simulated lunar or extraterrestrial terrain—bumpy, sloped, and rocky—including some tight turns. The first course was the actual track used by Mobility Test Articles, auditioning versions of Lunar Roving Vehicles that were used on the Moon. For the third race the course was moved a few miles, to the U.S. Space & Rocket Center. There, the track has taken varying paths through the rocket park and around the permanent lunar crater feature at the museum. Each year, the obstacles change slightly.

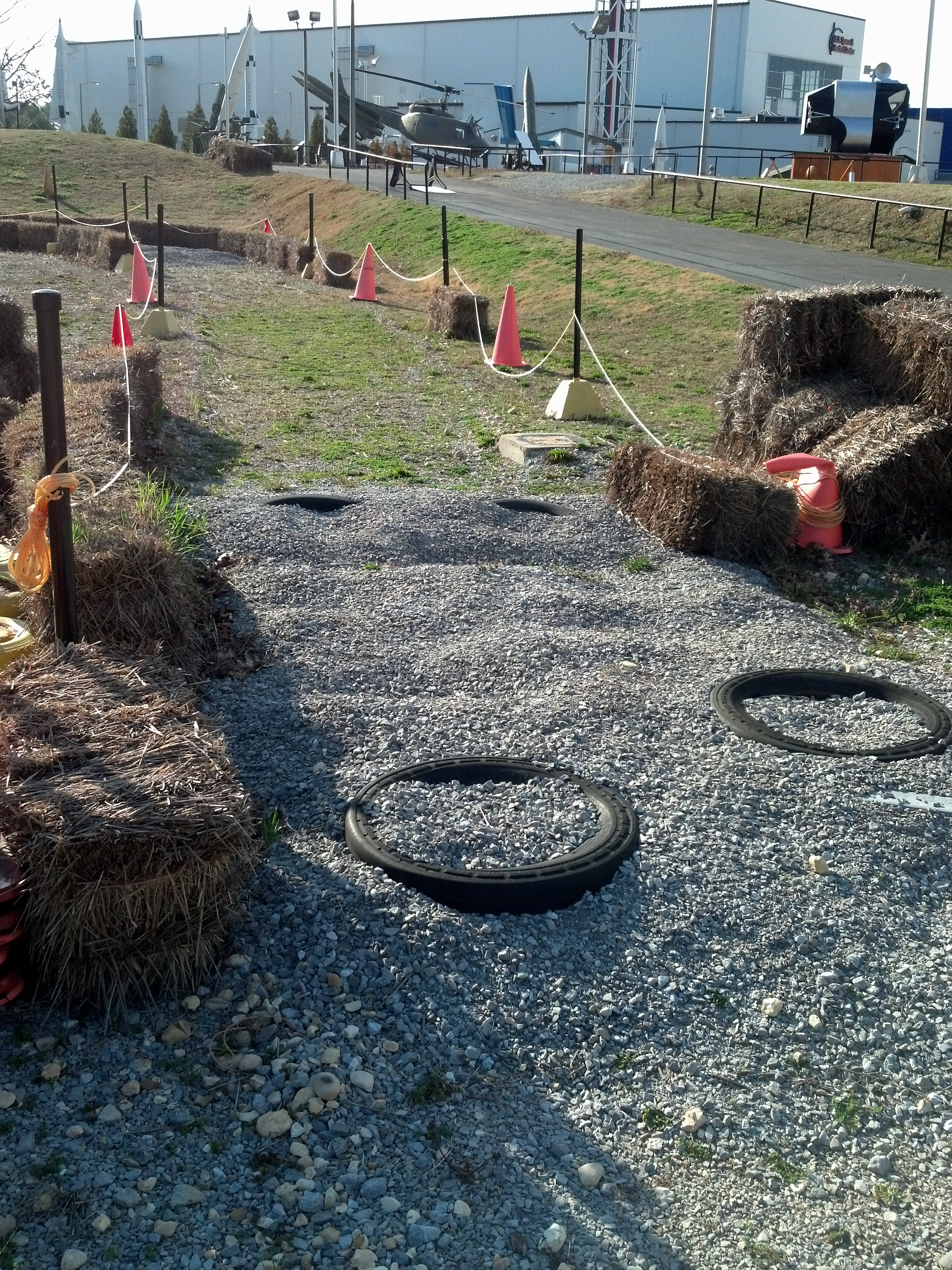
An obstacle for the 2013 contest awaits final preparations. Tires form small craters and gravel substitutes for Moon surface material.

The obstacles are constructed of discarded tires, plywood, some 20 tons of gravel and five tons of sand, all to simulate lunar craters, basins, and rilles. The contest is challenging: in 2009, 29 of 68 teams competing did not complete the race. Sometimes the placement of the obstacle is an issue, with some teams hitting obstacles too fast after a downhill stint.

Before students tackle the race course, their vehicles must pass inspection. At the team's start time, the two riding students must carry the buggy, collapsed to fit in a 5-foot (1.5 m) cube (pre-2014 a 4-foot (1.2 m) cube), for 20 feet (6.1 m), then expand the rover and ride it across the obstacles and along the track, avoiding cones marking the edges of the course, bales of hay, and other obstructions, while successfully navigating the modest hills of the terrain and obstacles. After the race, another inspection assesses the condition of the vehicle, with time penalties if parts are missing.

== Contestants ==
Contestants are high school and university students largely from the United States, including Puerto Rico. Teams have also come from Canada, Mexico, India, Germany, and Romania to participate.

== Awards ==
Numerous awards are offered each year, some with significant prizes. First place college winners have received trips to Shuttle launches and cash prizes, while others have received weekends at Space Camp. In 2009, there were 11 categories for special recognition with 19 recipients thereof. Consistent from the beginning have been awards for fastest time and for best design. Other awards acknowledge simplicity of design, safety, tenacity, team spirit, improvement over previous years' entries, and exceptional new entries.

== Winners ==
This list gives winners for time(^{t}) and design(^{d}) awards which have been consistently offered since the start. Awards were often also given for other categories but they are not included here in the interest of readability.

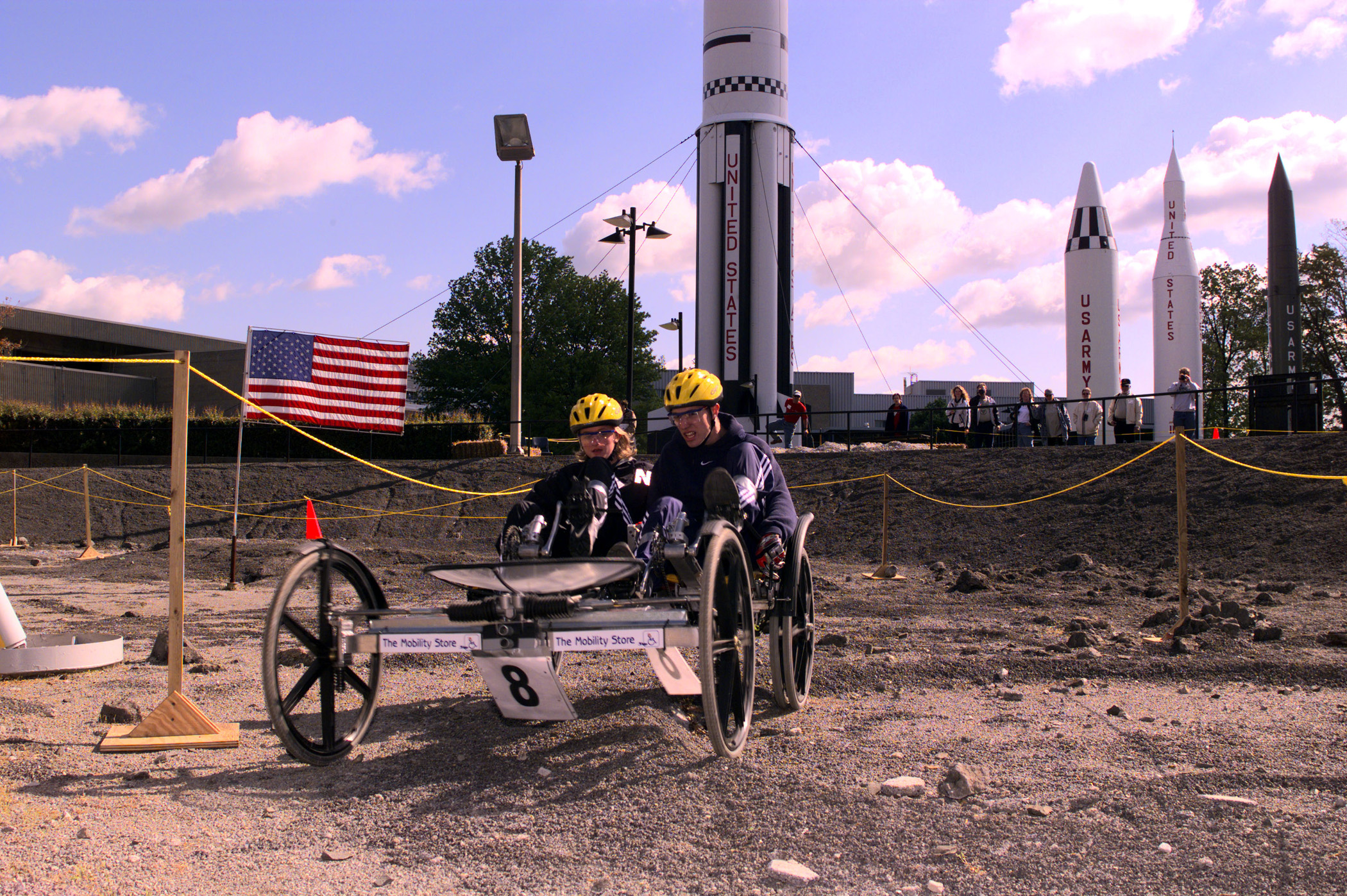
Students from Graff Career Center, Springfield, Missouri. navigate the 360° turn around the permanent crater feature at the U.S. Space & Rocket Center in 1999.

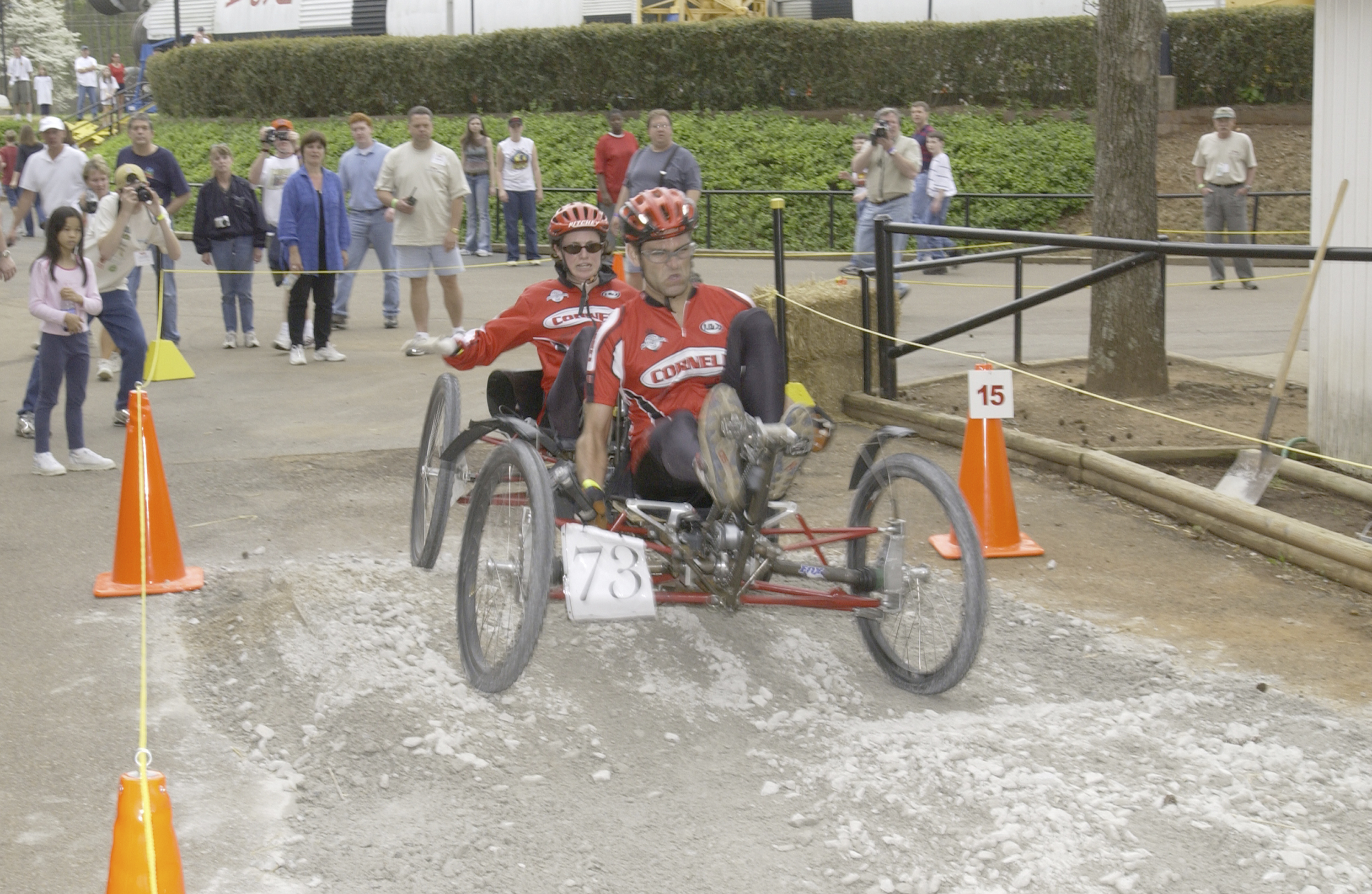
The Cornell #2 team competes in the 2002 race.

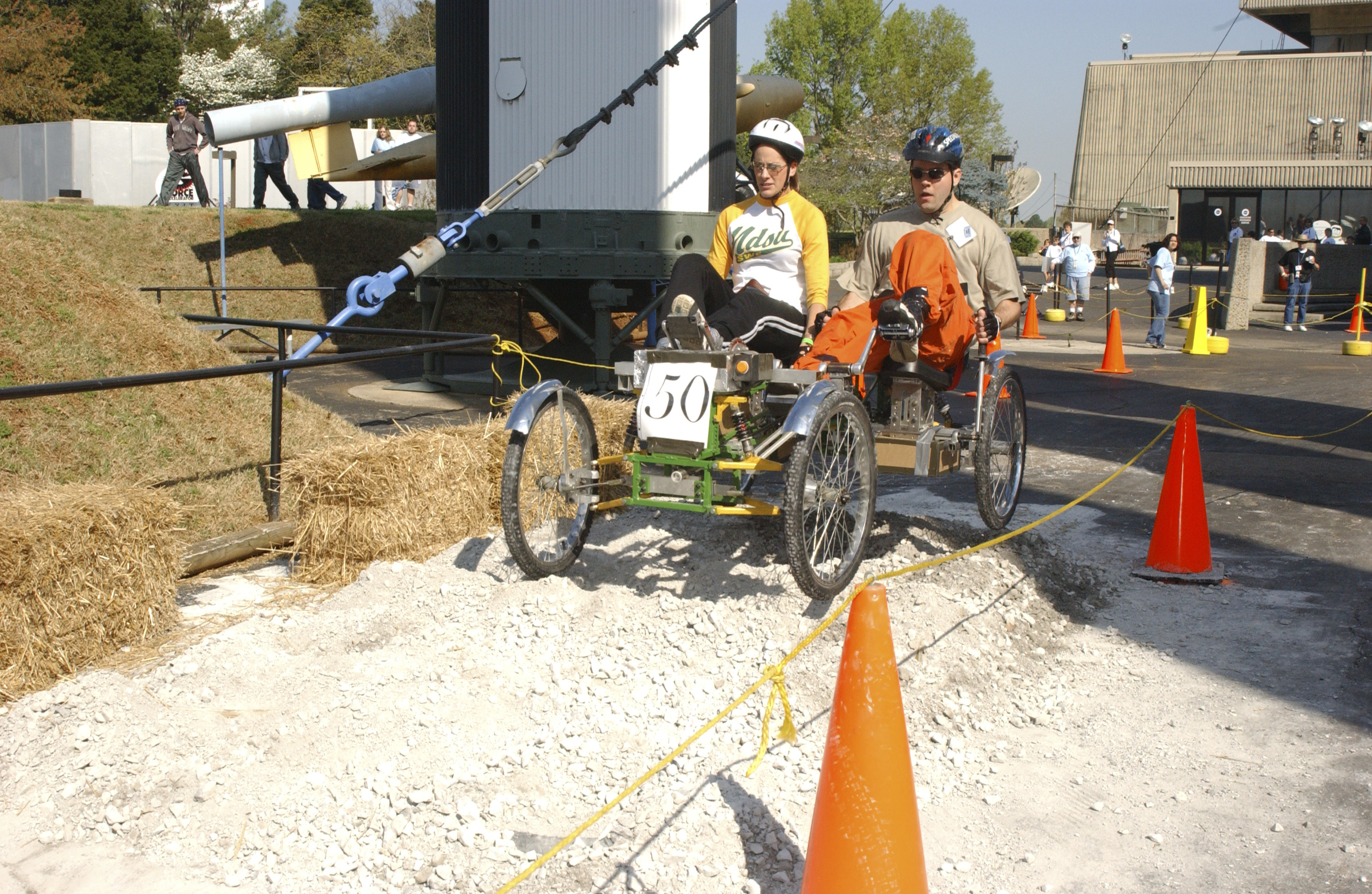
North Dakota State University students enter an obstacle on the course in 2003.

Year	High School	College	Remarks
1994	none	University of New Hampshire^{t} University of Puerto Rico at Humacao^{d}	Original test track, 1.4 miles, rain
1995	none	Georgia Institute of Technology^{t} University of Alabama in Huntsville^{d}	Original test track
1996	Bob Jones High School^{td}	University of Alabama in Huntsville^{t} Arizona State University^{d}	First at USSRC, 3/4-mile (1.2 km) track
1997	Monterey High School (Louisiana)^{td}	University of California at Santa Barbara^{td}	1/2-mile (0.80 km) track
1998	Monterey High School^{t} Autauga County Vocational Center^{d}	College of New Jersey^{t} Arizona State University^{d}	Rain
1999	Graff Career Center^{td}	Pittsburg State University team 4^{t} College of New Jersey^{d}	
2000	Pittsburg High School, Kansas^{t} Orleans Parish Area Schools^{d}	College of New Jersey^{t} South Dakota State University^{d}	First two-day contest
2001	Graff Career Center^{t} Lafayette County High School (Missouri) team 1^{d}	Pittsburg State University team 2^{t} University of New Hampshire^{d}	
2002	Lafayette County High School in Higginsville, Mo.^{t} New Orleans Area Schools team 2^{d}	Cornell University^{t} College of New Jersey^{d}	
2003	Lafayette County (Mo.) C-1 High School Team No. 2^{t}	North Dakota State University^{t}	
2004	New Orleans Area High Schools	North Dakota State University^{t}	
2005	Madison County Career Academy team 1^{t}	Utah State University^{t}	
2006	Huntsville Center for Technology^{t}	Pittsburg State University^{t}	
2007	Huntsville Center for Technology^{t}	Rochester Institute of Technology^{t}	
2008	Erie High School (Kansas) Team 2^{t} Erie High School Team 1^{d}	University of Evansville^{t} Pittsburg State University^{d}	
2009	tie Erie High School (Kansas)^{t} tie Huntsville Center for Technology Team 2^{t} Tudor Vianu National High School of Computer Science^{d}	Rochester Institute of Technology^{t} Tennessee Technological University^{d}	0.7 miles (1.1 km) course
2010	International Space Education Institute of Leipzig^{t} Teodoro Aguilar Mora Vocational High School Team 2^{d}	The University of Puerto Rico at Humacao^{t} University of Alabama in Huntsville^{d}	
2011	Teodoro Aguilar Mora Vocational High School Team 2^{t}	University of Puerto Rico in Humacao^{t}	UPRH is the only contestant to enter in every race thus far.
2012	Petra Mercado High School^{t} Colegio Nuestra Señora del Perpetuo Socorro-Humacao^{d}	University of Alabama in Huntsville^{t} International Space Education Institute Team Russia in Moscow^{d}	
2013	Teodoro Aguilar Mora Vocational High School^{t} Academy of Arts, Careers and Technology^{d}	University of Puerto Rico at Humacao^{t} Southern Illinois University^{d}	There was some concern that the race might be called off due to sequestration, but NASA Associate Administrator for Education, Leland D. Melvin specifically exempted the event.
2014	Academy of Arts, Careers and Technology^{td}	University of Puerto Rico at Humacao Team 2^{t} Middle Tennessee State University – Team 2^{d}	First "Human Exploration Rover Challenge," harder course, non-pneumatic wheels
2015	University Gardens High School of San Juan, Puerto Rico^{t} Parish Episcopal School of Dallas, Texas^{d}	International Space Education Institute Team Russia of Moscow^{t} Auburn University of Auburn, Alabama^{d}	
2016	Purdue University Calumet – Team 1^{t} Purdue University Calumet – Team 2^{d}	Rafaelina E. Lebron Flores of Patillas, Puerto Rico^{t} Colegio Nuestra Senora del Perpetuo Socorro of Humacao^{d}	This was the first year for teams to design their own wheels. The 2016 contest also added four sample collections of liquid, pebbles, large rocks, and soil.
2018	Buckhorn High School^{f}	University of Alabama in Huntsville - Team 1	This was the first year the competition included a points system. Points were awarded for the weight of the buggies as well as obstacles and missions completed around the course. Teams were given 6 minutes to complete tasks, and the 7th minute to reach the finish line.
2021	Parish Episcopal School Team 1	Universidad Nacional de Colombia	On-Site activities cancelled due to COVID-19. Overall winners decided by design, documentation, and presentation categories.

^{t}First place for time
^{d}Best design award
^{f}Featherweight award
