= Rafael Surillo =

Puerto Rican politician

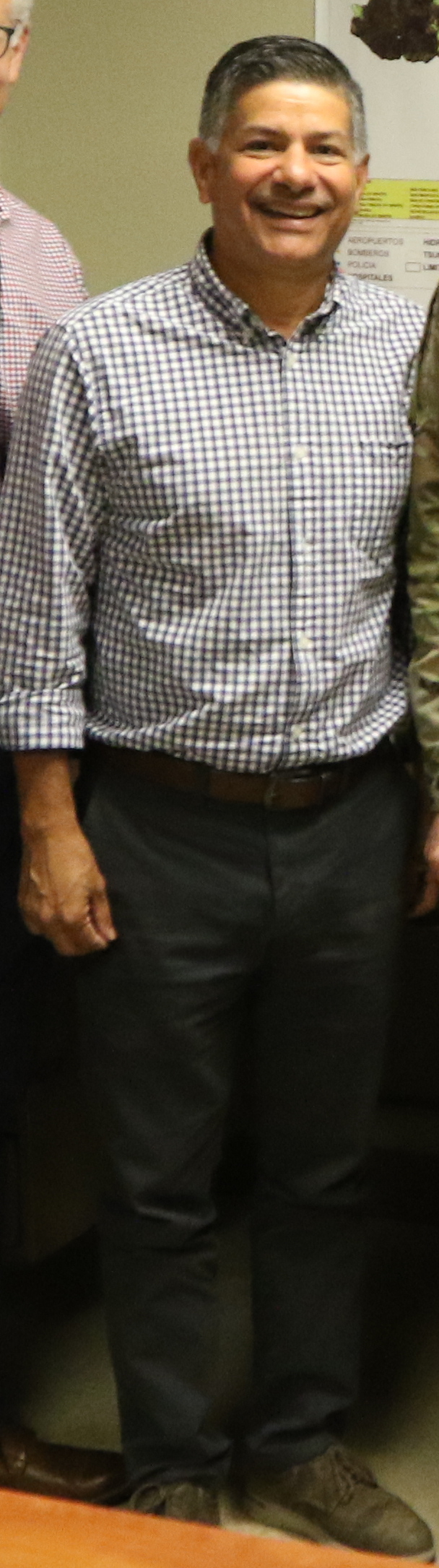

Mayor of Yabucoa
- Incumbent
- Assumed office January 14, 2013
- Preceded by: Angel García de Jesús

Member of the Municipal Assembly of Yabucoa, Puerto Rico
- In office 1997–2000

Personal details
- Born: September 20, 1963 (age 62) Yabucoa, Puerto Rico
- Party: Popular Democratic Party (PPD)

Rafael Surillo Ruiz is a Puerto Rican politician and the current mayor of Yabucoa. Surillo served as vice mayor of Yabucoa from 1997 to 2000. He is affiliated with the Popular Democratic Party (PPD) and has served as mayor since 2013.
