= International Space Education Institute =

History and programs

The International Space Education Institute was established in Leipzig, Germany by Ralf Heckel and 6 more members of the society including Prof. Dr. Jesco von Puttkamer as councilor in October 2005 to support high school and college students in international space competitions (Amtsgericht Leipzig, VR 4401, non-profit, benefit accepted by Finanzamt Leipzig). They bring professional astronauts, including Chen Dong, to their programs for students to learn from.

== supportive companies (internal) ==
Space Hotel Leipzig
