= University of Puerto Rico at Humacao =

Public college in Humacao, Puerto Rico

Coordinates: 18°08′40″N 65°49′53″W

University of Puerto Rico-Humacao
- Universidad de Puerto Rico en Humacao
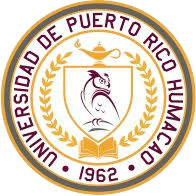
- Seal of the University of Puerto Rico at Humacao
- Motto: Siempre Búhos (Always Owls)
- Type: Public college
- Established: 1962; 64 years ago
- Affiliations: American Association for Hispanics in Higher Education, National Collegiate Honors Council, Hispanic Association of Colleges and Universities, Sea-grant, space-grant
- Endowment: US $2,739 million
- President: Zayira Jordán Conde
- Rector: Dr. Edwin Mojica Rodríguez
- Faculty: 223
- Administrative staff: 353
- Students: 4,732
- Undergraduates: 3,628
- Location: PR-908, KM 1.2, Humacao, 00792, Puerto Rico
- Campus: Urban, 62 acres
- Colors: Gold, Gray and Wine
- Nicknames: Búhos (Masculine) and Búhas (Feminine)
- Sporting affiliations: LAI
- Mascot: El Búho (The Owl)

The University of Puerto Rico-Humacao (Spanish: Universidad de Puerto Rico en Humacao, UPRH or UPR-Humacao) is a public college in Humacao, Puerto Rico. It is part of the University of Puerto Rico. Its campus is home to the UPRH Astronomical Observatory and the college graduates more majors in chemistry, physics, and mathematics than any other higher education institution on the island. UPRH has been accredited by the Middle States Commission on Higher Education (MSCHE) since 1965.

== History ==
In 1962, the University of Puerto Rico at Humacao was founded as the first UPR Regional College providing students from the eastern region of the country access to the University of Puerto Rico and facilitating the transfer to other UPR units with higher levels of academic offerings. The Middle States Association of Colleges and Schools gave the Regional College its first accreditation in 1965. From 1967 to 1972, the institution established around 8 associate degrees in Administrative Sciences, Health Sciences, and Arts. Pedro González Ramos was the second Dean of the University of Puerto Rico at Humacao from 1960 to 1972.

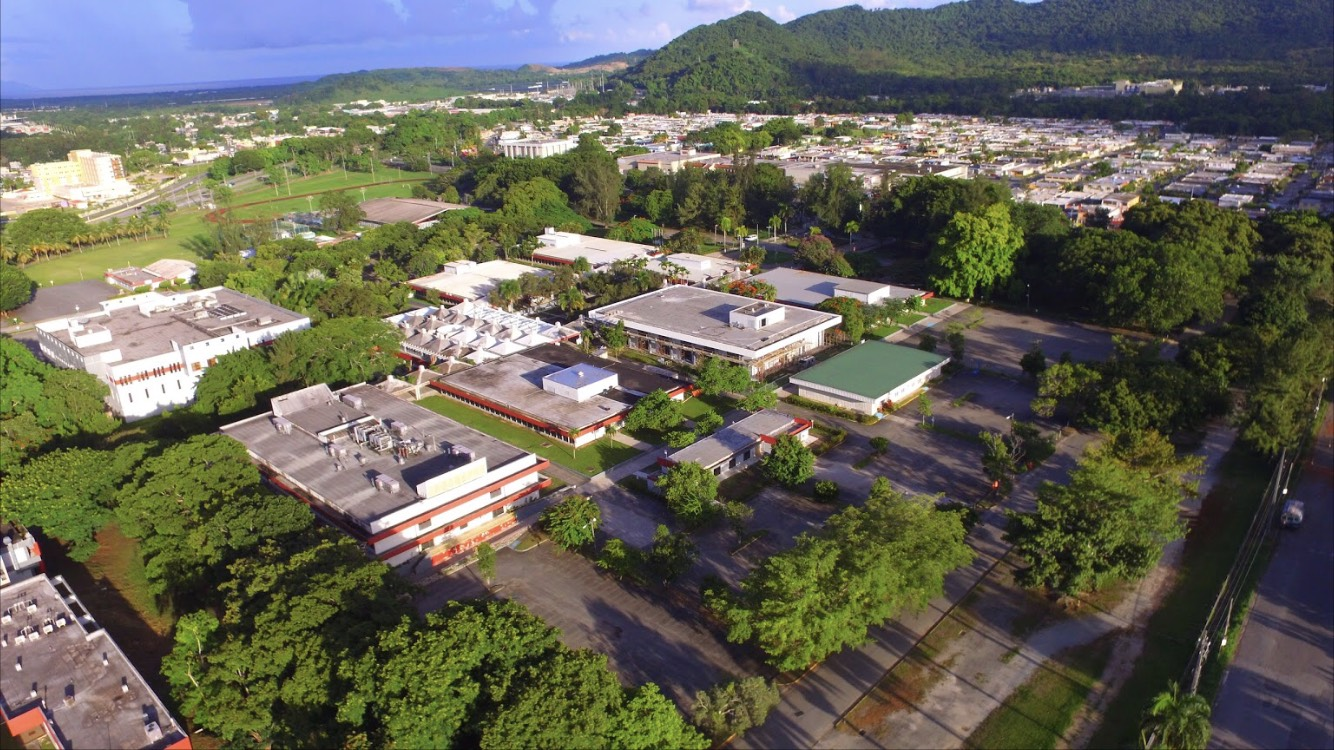
The UPRH aerial view.

In 1973, the Regional College was renamed as the Humacao University College (also known as CUH) approved by the Legislature of Puerto Rico, and started offering bachelor's degrees in Arts and Sciences. Between 1973 and 1987 over 18 bachelor's degrees were established and offered. The Council for Higher Education Accreditation gave the CUH its autonomy permitting the designation of the first rector (chancellor) and directive bodies.

The University of Puerto Rico Board of Trustees changed the institution's name in 1999 to the University of Puerto Rico at Humacao. Nowadays, the UPRH is accredited by the Middle States Commission on Higher Education and offers over 26 undergraduate programs, including 5 associate degrees.

In 2010 the campus went on strike as part of the 2010–2011 University of Puerto Rico strikes. In 2017 in response to budget cuts to the university system by the Financial Oversight and Management Board for Puerto Rico the campus students voted to join the University of Puerto Rico strikes, 2017.

== Academics ==
The UPR Humacao campus offers more than 26 undergraduate major programs, through 10 departments in Natural Sciences, Administrative Sciences, Health Sciences, Social Sciences, and Arts. Based on a semester system, the UPRH academic calendar is composed of three academic semesters each year. The academic year begins in the fall, running from August to December. The spring semester begins in January and ends in May. The summer semester is optional to the students that generally span around six weeks, from either late in May or early in June until July.

=== Demographics ===
More than 4,000 students were enrolled at the UPR Humacao campus in the 2016–17 academic year, including approximately 3,628 undergraduate students. The Fall 2016 Freshman class of approximately 990 students earned admission to the university campus with an average SAT score of 1458 – 1809 (out of 2400). UPRH is the most powerful campus in the eastern region of the Island, with students representing every east municipality, including the municipality-islands of Vieques and Culebra; and also students from all around the Island, US, and other countries.

As of the Fall 2016 semester, the student diversity profile of the university consisted of: 86.5% Hispanic/Latino, 13.1% Unknown Ethnicity, 0.2% White, 0.2% Black/African-American, and 0.1% Asian. Also, the campus had 63.9 percent female students and 36.1 percent male students.

=== Accredited programs ===
Twelve of the UPRH undergraduate programs are accredited by the following professional agencies:

- The Nursing undergraduate program – National League for Nursing (NLN)
- The bachelor's degree in Social Work – Council on Social Work Education (CSWE)
- The associate degree in Physical Therapy – Commission on Accreditation in Physical Therapy Education (CAPTE)
- The four bachelor's degree in Business Administration and the bachelor's degree in Office Systems Administration – Accreditation Council for Business Schools and Programs (ACBSP)
- The bachelor's degrees in Education K-3 and the bachelor's degree in Elementary and Secondary English – National Council for Accreditation of Teacher Education (NCATE)
- The associate degree in Electronics Technology – Accreditation Board for Engineering and Technology (ABET).

=== Departments ===
==== Natural Sciences ====
- Department of Biology
- Department of Physics and Electronics
- Department of Mathematics
- Department of Chemistry

==== Administrative Sciences ====
- Department of Business Administration
- Department of Office Systems Administration

==== Health Sciences ====
- Department of Nursing
- Department of Physical Therapy
- Department of Occupational Therapy

==== Social Sciences ====
- Department of Social Sciences

==== Arts ====
- Department of Communication Technologies
- Department of English
- Department of Humanities
- Department of Social Work
- Department of Spanish

The Academic Honors Program (PAH, by its Spanish acronym) from the University of Puerto Rico at Humacao was established in 1989. The Program enrolls students from all faculties of the UPRH who are prepared to comply with the requirements of it (a total of 11 credits): a research seminar, an independent study, an undergraduate thesis, and a third language; and its objective is to complement and enrich, within an interdisciplinary framework, the actual curriculum of students whose desires are to pursue graduated studies. The Academic Honors Program of the UPR Humacao campus is a member of the National Collegiate Honors Council and of the Puerto Rico University Association of Honor Programs.

=== Unique programs ===
UPRH lies in the east of the island, highlighting the chemical-pharmaceutical and electronics as well as several areas of ecological and tourist value. To meet the demand for labor in that region UPRH offers unique baccalaureate programs in the UPR system and Puerto Rico in:

- Industrial Chemistry
- Computational Mathematics
- Applied Physics to Electronics
- Coastal Marine Biology
- Wild Life Management

Also, other unique major programs that UPRH offers are:

- Social Action Research
- International Commerce
- Occupational Therapy

This campus has been the scene of the Dove Project Sabanera, native species threatened with extinction, Project Moonbuggy for designing lunar vehicles, and maintains the Microbial Observatory of the Salinas in Cabo Rojo sponsored by the National Science Foundation. In April 2017, the UPR Humacao team won the first place in the university category during the fourth competition of NASA Human Exploration Rover Challenge which was held at the U.S. Space & Rocket Center in Huntsville, Alabama.

=== Faculty ===
The faculty is composed of the Chancellor, the Dean of Academic Affairs, the academic department directors, and the teaching staff of the university. As of Fall 2016, the student to faculty ratio for the UPRH 16:1, and there was more than 223 instructional faculty at the campus. Fifty percent of the faculty has doctoral degree and forty percent has mastery. Thirty-nine percent of the teaching staff held the rank of University Full Professor. In the same way, 359 non-teaching employees worked in the institution, of which fifty percent were female; fifteen of these employees had a master's degree, forty percent had baccalaureate, ten percent had an associate degree, and thirty-five percent had non-university education.

UPRH faculty continue to be recognized on the academic stage constantly by many national agencies and associations as the Dictionary of Caribbean and Afro-Latin American Biography, the Partnership for Research and Education in Materials, National Science Foundation, Annual Biomedical Research Conference for Minority Students, the Puerto Rico Board of Accountacy, and the Emeritus Professor award. In June 2017, the International Astronomical Union assigned the name (11456) Cotto-Figueroa to the asteroid previously known as 1981 EK9 in recognition of the scientific researches executed by the Professor Desireé Cotto Figueroa, Director of the Astronomical Observatory of the University of Puerto Rico in Humacao.

=== Graduation ===
The first UPRH Commencement ceremony was held in 1968, where 4 associate degrees were conferred (Accounting, Management, Nursing, and Secretarial Sciences). In the 2016–2017 academic year, the UPR Humacao campus awarded more than 574 undergraduate degrees, having 31 summa cum laude, 127 magna cum laude, and 80 cum laude academic distinctions. Commencement ceremonies are held once a year, at the end of the second semester of the academic year. Students that complete graduation requirements at the end of the summer session or in the first academic year, may request a Graduation Certificate at the Registrar's Office on which will be reflected that they have completed their studies.

=== Library ===
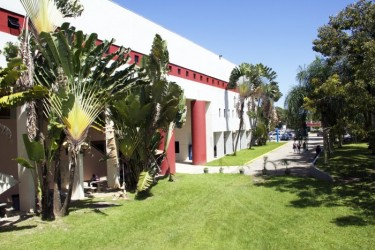
The Aguedo Mojica Marrero Library (UPRH Library).

The UPR Humacao library (or Águedo Mojica Marrero Library) is one the largest and most comprehensive library in the UPR System. In addition to creating active collections, the library keeps 99,774 volumes in its book collection, 66,230 journal titles, and it is subscribed to 2 newspapers. The Library is located in a three-story building that has 88,000 square feet. It has six (6) reading rooms, more than 56 computers, two (2) microfiche readers, eleven (11) individual study rooms, and 148 cubicles. The library can accommodate 589 users. The integration of the IT infrastructure with the bibliographic infrastructure facilitates the creation of skill development information programs that supplements those of the classrooms and the training of users in the handling of electronic resources applied to the academic work. The library personnel and professional librarians have managed to turn the Institution into the home of very important biblio-technological projects, such as CONUCO (Puerto Rican journals database) and EMEUPR (authorities’ Spanish database of the UPR).

The UPRH's Library uses the University of Puerto Rico automated system known as Horizon and is connected to the Internet through various means. This IT infrastructure facilitates the sharing within the UPR libraries and the sharing with other academic entities around the world. Also, since 2008 the Águedo Mojica Marrero Library is a member of the Association of Colleges and Research Libraries (ACRL).

== Research ==
Recently, the University of Puerto Rico at Humacao received a 3 million grant from the National Science Foundation for the Partnership for Research and Education in Materials (PREM) program in collaboration with the University of Pennsylvania. Research conducted through the collaboration will focus on two nanotechnology-related topics: multi-functional nanodevices from optoelectronic materials and nanoscale interactions of macromolecules at soft and hard interfaces.

The UPRH is part of the Space-Grant Consortium by NASA that is focused in the research, education, and workforce development of Puerto Rico in Science, Technology, Engineering, and Mathematics. Also, UPR Humacao have the Sea-Grant program dedicated to the scientific research in marine and coastal resources, and its conservation in Puerto Rico and the Caribbean region.

=== Public Health Relevance ===
The Maximizing Access to Research Careers Undergraduate Student Training in Academic Research (MARC U-STAR) Program of the University of Puerto Rico at Humacao increases the number of underrepresented minority students that will pursue graduate studies in the Biomedical Sciences and complete a Ph.D., Ph.D./D.V.M. or M.D./Ph.D. degree in disciplines relevant to biomedical research. The MARC U-STAR program provides intensive research training, critical thinking development, communication skills development, interpersonal skills development, and preparation for entrance to graduate school.

== Student life ==
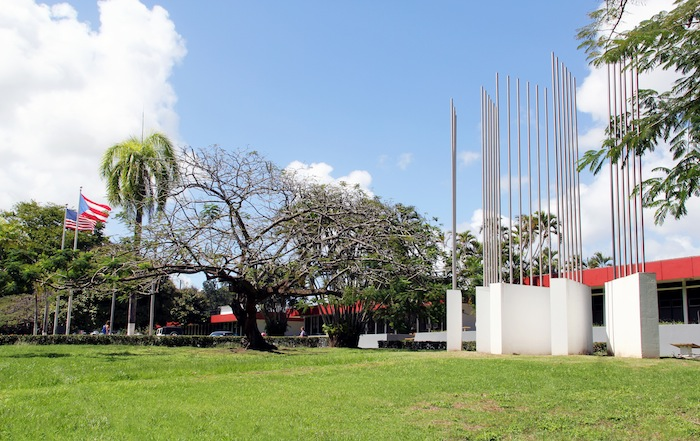
The main entrance of the University of Puerto Rico, Humacao Campus.

The UPR Humacao campus provides multiple services and necessary resources for students to be successful both in the classroom and in their personal lives. Under the Division of Student Affairs, UPRH students have access to involvement opportunities, dining facilities, recreational outlets, health and wellness services, fitness center, and more.

Also, the campus provides:

- internet access
- computers in libraries, student center and labs
- email account provided by school
- career counseling, interest Inventory, and resume assistance
- birth control, personal, academic, and psychological counseling
- library on campus, and non-remedial tutoring
- hospital on campus

=== UPRH Astronomical Observatory ===
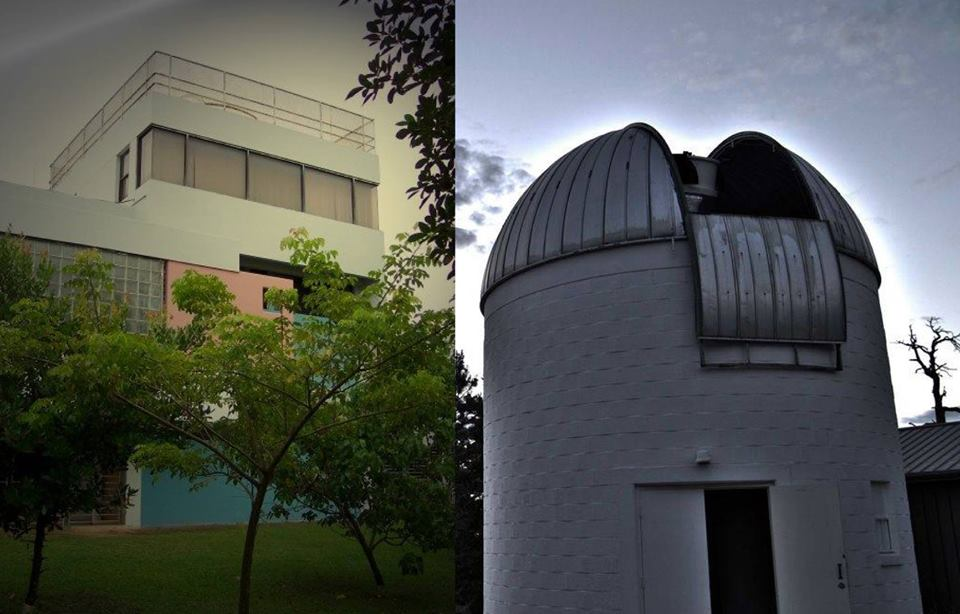
The Astronomical Observatory of the UPR Humacao.

The Astronomical Observatory is in the Physics (Science) building on the campus. Donated by NASA to the UPR in the late 60's, the UPR Humacao Astronomical Observatory was founded in 1985 being a major island-wide resource in astronomy. The observatory also serves the Astronomical Society of Puerto Rico, school teachers, science fair students, radio and television stations. The sun and moon Eclipses are broadcast live from the observatory, making it one of the best known facilities in the university and the best attraction of the campus.

Also, it is located on top of the fourth floor of the Science Building; and has a dark/storage room, computers room, and visitors room underneath. The UPR Humacao Astronomical Observatory is open to the entire University community and general public in the island free of any charges on most Thursday nights and the talks can be in Spanish, English or both (depending on the audience), always welcoming questions during the presentation.

=== Cultural activities ===
UPRH stimulates literary, musical and theatrical creation in the university community, through various events to present the art-works, such as contests, festivals and recitals. Also, provides the opportunity to the talent of the university community through the creation of projects, exhibitions and presentations that serve as artistic experiences that reinforce their learning process in our Institution.

=== Student associations ===
There are a wide variety of registered student organizations at UPRH, including academic, professional, special interest, and multicultural groups. UPR Humacao students are welcome to join existing organizations or create their own.

=== Fraternity ===
The UPR Humacao campus has a chapter of Nu Sigma Beta fraternity (ΝΣΒ).

=== Casa Roig Museum ===
Casa Roig Museum was donated by the Roig family to the University of Puerto Rico at Humacao and opened its doors to the public on 1989. Since then, it has been a historical footprint and testimony of the prairie style adapted to the tropic, and a cultural dissemination center.

== Athletics ==
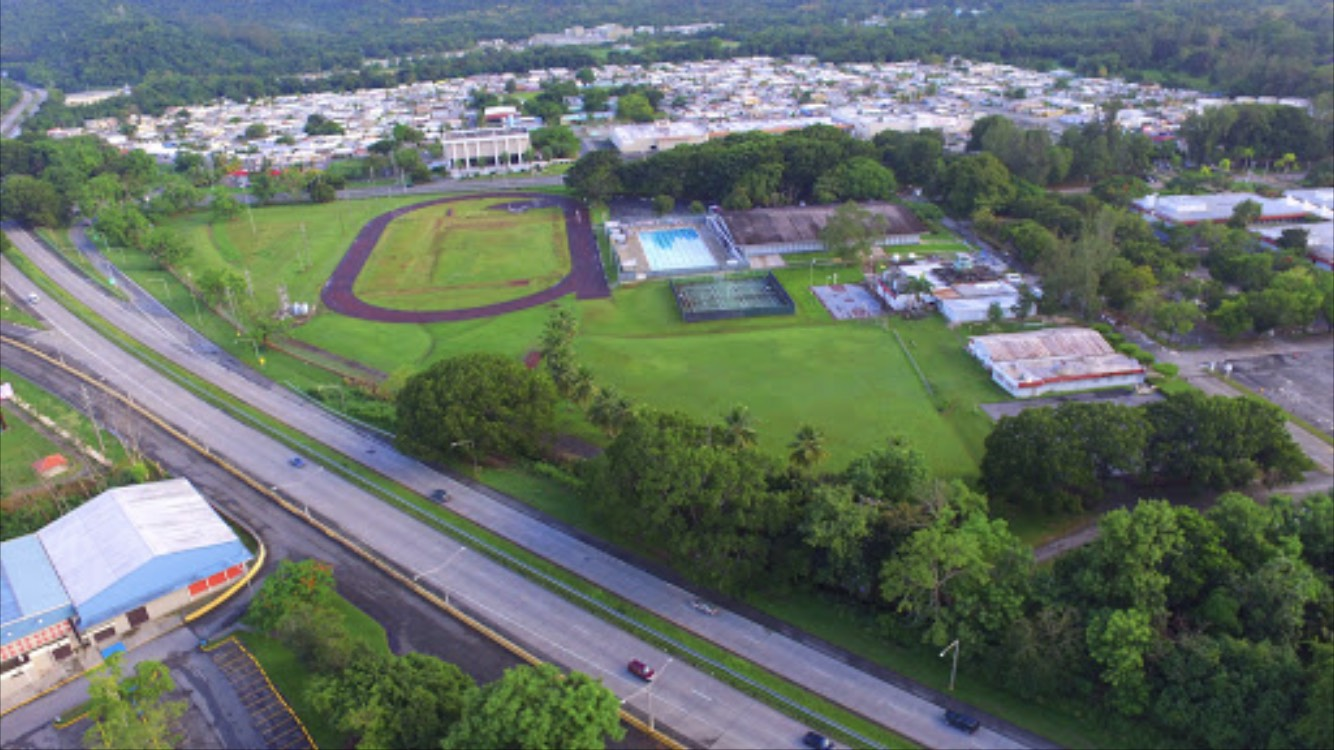
UPRH Athletics Park (Aerial View).

The university currently sponsors 17 varsity men's and women's sports, including:

Men's sports include:

- Baseball
- Basketball
- Olympic Swimming
- Table Tennis
- Tennis
- Volleyball
- Weightlifting
- Wrestling

Women's sports include:

- Softball
- Basketball
- Olympic Swimming
- Table Tennis
- Tennis
- Volleyball
- Weightlifting
- Wrestling

== Notable people ==
| Name | Role | Faculty | Class |
|---|---|---|---|
| Eladio Carrión | Rapper | Arts | 2016 |
| Itzamar Peña Ramírez | Senator of Puerto Rico | Social Work | 1996 |
| Eric Bachier Román | Puerto Rico Politician | Chemistry | 1996 |
| Aníbal Meléndez Rivera | Puerto Rico Politician | Business Administration | 1969 |
