= Timeline of Mayagüez, Puerto Rico =

History of Mayagüez, Puerto Rico by century

The following is a timeline of the history of the municipality of Mayagüez, Puerto Rico.

== 18th-19th centuries ==
- 1760 - Nuestra Señora de la Candelaria de Mayagüez (Our Lady of Candlemas) settlement established by Spanish colonist Faustino Martínez de Matos.
- 1763 - Settlement of Mayaguez formally separated from the larger San Germán area.
- 1770 - Population: 1,800.
- 1823 - José María Ramírez de Arellano becomes mayor.
- 1836
  - Mayaguez becomes a villa (chartered town).
  - Public warehouse and dock constructed.
- 1841
  - Fire.
  - "Entry port privilege" relocated to Mayaguez from Cabo Rojo (approximate date).
- 1845 - Mayagüez City Hall built.
- 1848 - El Imparcial and El Propagador newspapers begins publication.
- 1849 - Jail built.
- 1850 - El Semanario Mayaguezano begins publication.
- 1852 - Fire.
- 1860
  - Market building constructed.
  - San Antonio Hospital active (approximate date).
- 1863 - Avisador del Comercio newspaper begins publication.
- 1870 - Cemetery established.
- 1873 - Mayagüez attains city status.
- 1874 - Biblioteca Popular de Mayagüez (public library) and Circulo de Amigos founded.
- 1883 - Population: 26,705 in ayuntamiento (city); 123,583 in departamento (province).
- 1893 - Sociedad Anónima Tranvía de Mayagüez (transit entity) active (approximate date).
- 1894
  - Escuela Libre de Música (music school) founded.
  - City coat of arms granted.
- 1896 - Statue of Christopher Columbus erected in the Plaza Colón.
- 1898 - Theodore Schwan, a brigadier general of the U.S. enters Mayagüez with the American Cavalry after winning the Battle of Silva Heights.
- 1899
  - Hormigueros becomes part of Mayagüez.
  - Population: 15,187.

== 20th century ==
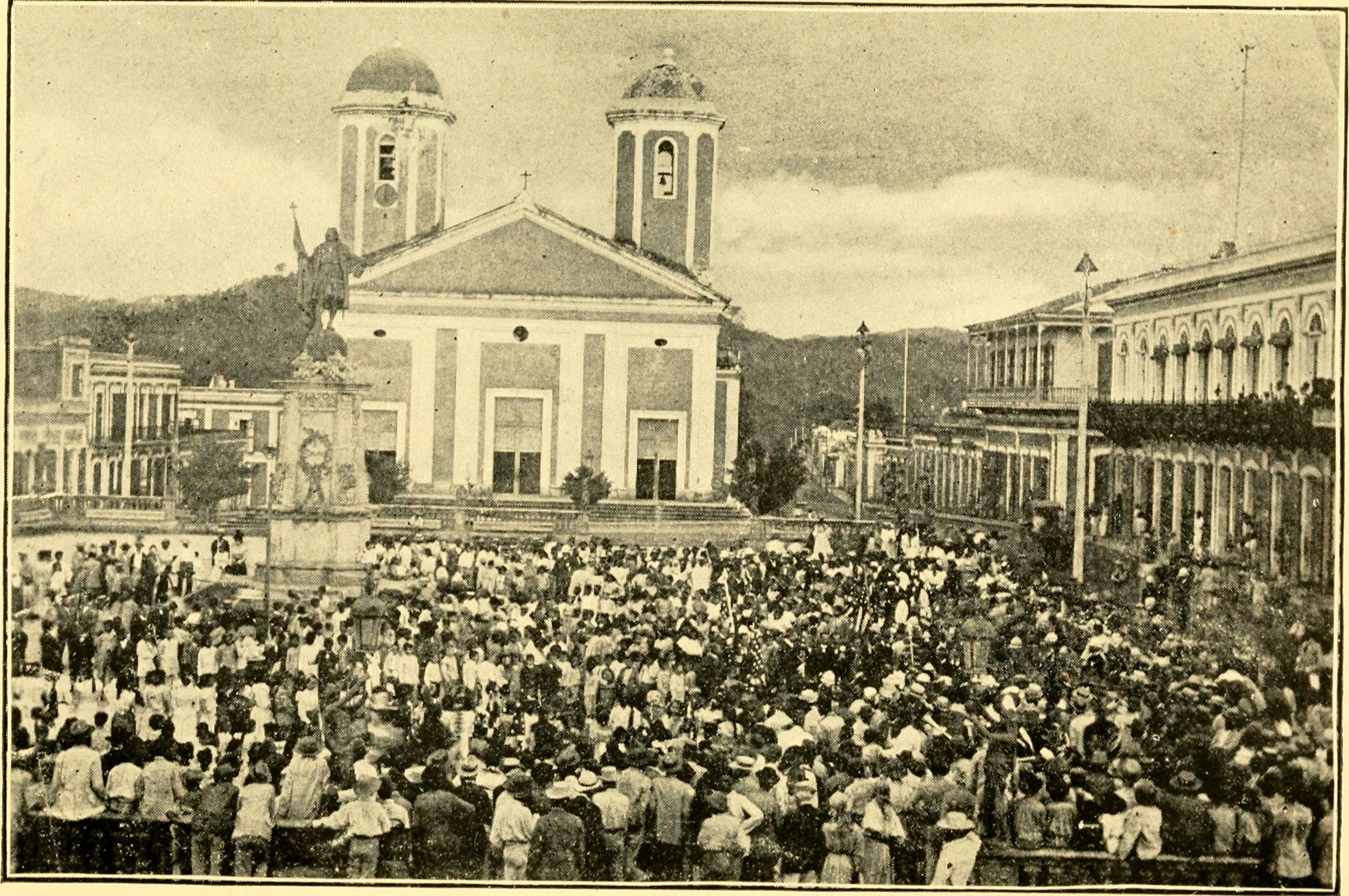
An event at the main town square in Mayagüez pueblo in 1907

- 1901
  - U.S. Tropical Agriculture Research Station founded.
  - Voz de la Patria newspaper begins publication.
- 1909 - Teatro Yagüez built.
- 1910 - Population: 16,591.
- 1911
  - College of Agriculture and Mechanic Arts opens. The US Department of Agriculture sends a field agent to the area of Mayagüez and Hormigueros to document everything he sees.
  - Diario del Oeste newspaper begins publication.
- 1912 - Masonic Logia Adelphia built.
- 1913
  - Mayagüez Tramway Company formed.
  - Centro Español built.
- 1918 - October 11: 1918 San Fermín earthquake.
- 1919 - June 19: Teatro Yagüez burns down.
- 1920 - Population: 19,069.
- 1926 - Tram service ends.
- 1930 - Population: 37,060.
- 1937
  - WPRA radio begins broadcasting.
  - Compañía Cervecera de Puerto Rico in business.
- 1938 - Indios de Mayagüez baseball team formed.
- 1940 - Population: 50,376.
- 1946 - WKJB radio begins broadcasting.
- 1955 - WORA-TV (television) begins broadcasting.
- 1966 - University of Puerto Rico at Mayagüez active.
- 1969 - Benjamin Cole becomes mayor.
- 1970 - Population: 68,872.
- 1976 - Roman Catholic Diocese of Mayagüez established.
- 1983 - First newspaper originating in Mayagüez begins publication.
- 1993 - José Guillermo Rodríguez becomes mayor.
- 2000 - Population: 78,647.

== 21st century ==
- 2010
  - Isidoro García Stadium and Mayagüez Athletics Stadium open.
  - Parque del Litoral (park) built.
  - 2010 Central American and Caribbean Games sport event held in Mayagüez.
  - Population: 89,080.

== See also ==
- History of Mayagüez
- List of mayors of Mayagüez, Puerto Rico
- National Register of Historic Places listings in Mayagüez
- Timeline of Bayamón, Puerto Rico, Ponce, San Juan

== Bibliography ==
=== in English ===
- M. de Magalhães (1898). "Mayaguez". Colonial Business Directory of the Island of Puerto Rico. New York. OCLC 39940968. (Also description of town)
- Robert Thomas Hill (1899), "Cities of Porto Rico: (Mayaguez)", Cuba and Porto Rico (2nd ed.), New York: Century Company
- Frederick A. Ober (1899), "Cities and Towns of the Coast: Mayaguez", Puerto Rico and its Resources, New York: D. Appleton and Co.
- "Porto Rico: Mayaguez". Official Commercial Directory of Cuba, Porto Rico and the Entire West Indies, with Bermuda. New York: Spanish-American Directories Company. 1901. pp. 423+.
- Charles Hartzell, ed. (1903), "Sketches of Cities, Towns, and Villages: Mayaguez", Register of Porto Rico, San Juan: Louis E. Tuzo and Co., pp. 191–192
- "Mayaguez". Commercial Guide and Business Directory of Porto Rico. New York: F.E. Platt. 1910. pp. 103–118.
- "Mayaguez" . Encyclopædia Britannica. Vol. 17 (11th ed.). 1910. p. 931.
- Ernst B. Filsinger (1922), "Mayaguez", Commercial Travelers' Guide to Latin America, Washington, DC: Government Printing Office
- Federal Writers' Project (1940), "Mayaguez", Puerto Rico: a Guide to the Island of Boriquén, American Guide Series, New York: University Society, pp. 252+, hdl:2027/mdp.39015030579083, OCLC 245805 – via HathiTrust
- Jorge Heine (1993). The Last Cacique: Leadership and Politics in a Puerto Rican City. University of Pittsburgh Press. ISBN 978-0-8229-7691-2. (About Bejamín Cole era)

=== in Spanish ===
- Manuel Ubeda y Delgado (1878). "Mayaguez". Isla de Puerto Rico: estudio histórico, geográfico y estadístico de la misma (in Spanish). Puerto Rico. (reprint 1998)
- "Mayaguez". Diccionario enciclopédico hispano-americano de literatura, ciencias y artes (in Spanish). Vol. 12. Barcelona: Montaner y Simon. 1893. hdl:2027/mdp.35112203969706.
- Subcomité de la Historia de Mayagüez (1960). Historia de Mayagüez, 1760-1960 (in Spanish). OCLC 38531160.
- Pedro Luis Perea Roselló (1962), Los periódicos y los periodistas de Mayagüez (in Spanish), Ponce: Ediciones Aldecoa, OCLC 912547459
- Silvia Aguiló Ramos (1986). Mayagüez: notas para su historia (in Spanish) (2nd ed.). San Juan: Comité Historia de los Pueblos. OCLC 16636824.
