= History of Mayagüez =

History of Mayagüez, Puerto Rico by century

The city of Mayagüez, in Western Puerto Rico, was founded by Spanish colonists in 1760. The area had long been settled by indigenous Taínos. Mayagüez became self-governing in 1763 and was made a villa (chartered town) in 1836. Severe fire damage in 1841 compelled extensive rebuilding. The town became the focus of a distinctive regional identity and was home to liberal and radical thinkers such as Eugenio María de Hostos and the pro-independence activist Ramón Emeterio Betances. City charter status was granted in 1877.

In the Spanish–American War of 1898, Mayagüez welcomed U.S. troops who occupied it on August 11 without a fight. The college that later became the University of Puerto Rico at Mayagüez opened in 1911. Severe destruction again occurred in the 1918 San Fermín earthquake. During the later 20th century, the city developed a large-scale export trade to the U.S., based on tuna processing and textiles.

== Founding ==
The history of Mayaguez began when the founding of the city was requested on July 19, 1760, by a group led by Faustino Martínez de Matos, Juan de Silva and Juan de Aponte, at a hill located about one kilometer inland from Mayagüez Bay and the outlet of the Yagüez River. It was officially founded on September 18, 1760. "Maygüez" was the indigenous name for this river (the word means "clear water" in the language of its original inhabitants, the Taíno). "Mayagüez" is a variation on this name, which means "Land of Clear Waters" and eventually gave the city its nickname. The Taínos had settled the area for hundreds of years before the town's founding, at the nearby settlement of Yagüeca (also spelled Yagüexa or Yaweka), which sits near a larger river, the Río Grande de Añasco (originally named "Guaorabo"). A theory likening the name to a nahuatl term which translates into "Land of the Setting Sun" is unsubstantiated.

The Spanish Crown granted the founders the right to self-government in 1763, formally separating the town from the larger Partido de San Germán. Originally the settlement was named Nuestra Señora de la Candelaria de Mayagüez (Our Lady of the Candelaria of Mayagüez). Most of the town's settlers, including its founders, came originally from the Canary Islands, whose patron saint is the Virgin of Candelaria, hence the name.

In 1777, two American frigates, the Endowok and the Henry, took refuge in Mayagüez Bay as to evade attack from the British ship HMS Glasgow. The local government lent two Spanish flags to the American frigates to disguise them as Spanish ships. After protesting unsuccessfully to the Spanish authorities, the captain of the Glasgow chose not to attack the ships and retired from the area.

== Villa status and the Great Fire of 1841 ==
On 7 May 1836, the settlement was elevated to the royal status of villa, and Rafael Mangual was named its first mayor. At the time, the villa's principal economic activity was agriculture. The famous patriot, educator, sociologist, philosopher, essayist, and novelist Eugenio María de Hostos was born in Mayagüez in 1839.

On 30 January 1841, a fire nearly destroyed the villa (it burned 300 out of the 500 existing housing units in town). The town was rebuilt with some of its main roads widened as to prevent any future fires to spread quickly. The Spanish military governor of Puerto Rico, Gen. Santiago de Méndez Vigo personally raised funding through a subscription fund to rebuild the entire city; eventually one of Mayagüez's three main thoroughfares was named in his honor.

The local fire department was founded in 1843; it contained major fires in 1852 and 1866 and performed hurricane rescue and relief operations in 1852. The villa's first census was held on 1844.

Mayagüez later became the cultural and political center of the western part of Puerto Rico. Due to its physical isolation from the rest of the island (the city was founded on a coastal valley surrounded by mountains) and its need for self-sufficiency from Puerto Rico's main government (which, some of its current inhabitants claim, lasts to this day) Mayagüez developed a peculiar local culture and a strong sense of regional pride that tends to distinguish its inhabitants from the rest of Puerto Rico's. Some historians claim that this strong, fiercely independent culture was responsible for breeding not only liberal thinkers such as Eugenio María de Hostos, but also radical ones such as Dr. Ramón Emeterio Betances, the father of the Puerto Rican independence movement and first medical director of Mayagüez's Municipal Hospital (currently known as Hospital San Antonio), Segundo Ruiz Belvis, the father of the Puerto Rican Abolitionism movement and a former city administrator, and José de Diego, first president of the Puerto Rico House of Representatives and founder of the local College of Agriculture and Mechanic Arts. The Grito de Lares, Puerto Rico's first major pro-independence revolt, was planned at a farm in the outskirts of town. The September 23, 1868 revolution was remotely organized by Dr. Betances who, twelve years earlier, had literally saved the town from extinction by a cholera epidemic that killed over 30,000 people in the island and decimated the town's population. Today, the local medical center and the main thoroughfare that crosses the city from north to south are named after Dr. Betances.

In 1870, a telegraph to the capital was inaugurated. Since 1858 postal service existed between both cities and the exterior.

== City status ==
On 10 July 1877, the villa formally received its city charter from the Royal Crown of Spain.

The Escuela Libre de Música or Free Music School was founded in 1894 and directed by Fernando Callejo. In 1896, a statue was raised in the main plaza to honor Cristopher Columbus. That same year the villa formally received its current formal title, "Excelente Ciudad de Mayagüez". The local produce market, the Plaza del Mercado, formerly an open-air market, was eventually housed in a new building erected in the early 1890s, a prefabricated structure designed by Gustave Eiffel's construction company.

== Late 19th and 20th centuries ==
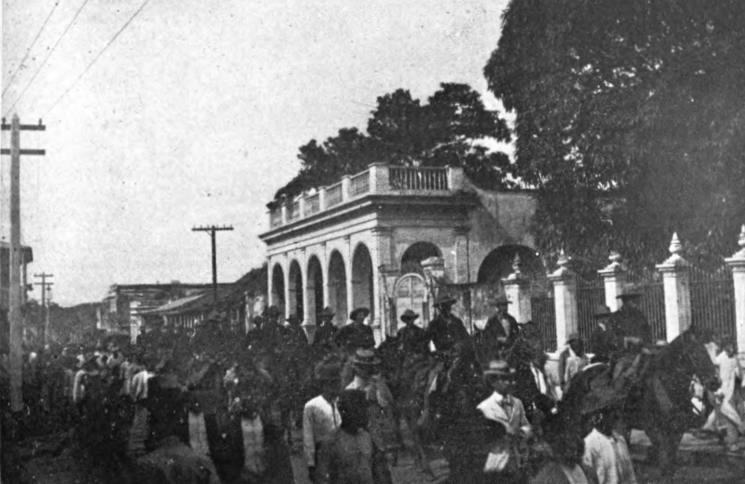
American Cavalry entering Mayagüez on the 11th of August 1898

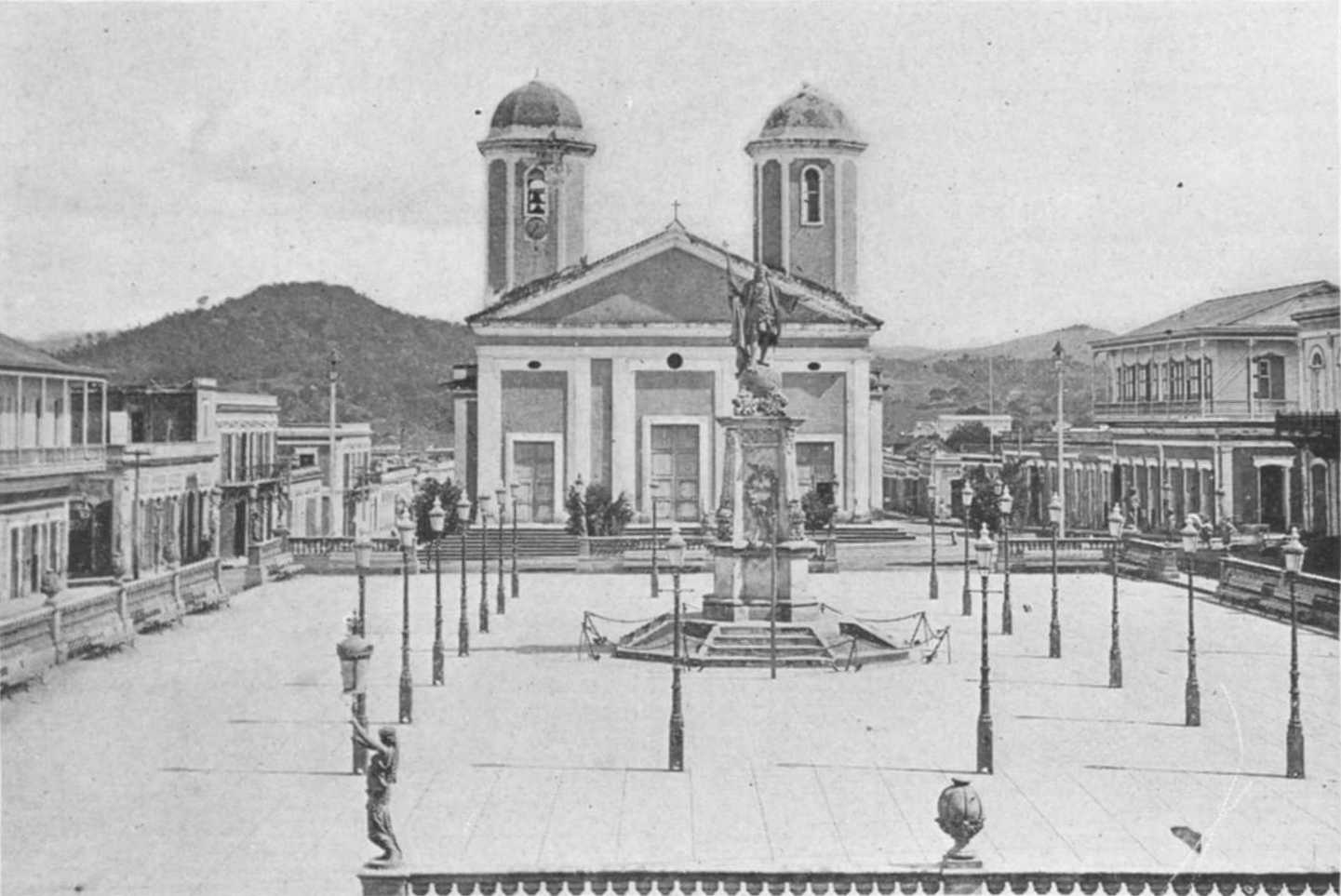
Mayaguez's Plaza Colón and Nuestra Señora de la Candelaria church (later cathedral), 1898

On August 11, 1898, during the Spanish–American War, U.S. troops (from the 5th. Cavalry, 11th. Infantry and 19th. Infantry, under Gen. Theodore Schwan) entered Mayagüez. Spanish troops encircled the city however. A battle never occurred, and the invading troops were well received. According to chronicles of the day a young local boy was given the task of raising the Star and Stripes at the Casa del Rey (City Hall) and raised it upside down, with the canton to the floor, without knowing this was a symbol of distress. A few of the American troops eventually settled in Mayagüez, including Sgt. Frank Cole, the father of later mayor Benjamín Cole.

In 1911, the College of Agriculture and Mechanic Arts was founded in Mayagüez. Today it is known as the University of Puerto Rico at Mayagüez (UPRM)—the Caribbean's leading science and engineering institution.

The city of Mayagüez was nearly destroyed again on October 11, 1918, by an earthquake and a tsunami. Most of the town had to be rebuilt, including the U.S. Customs House and the Mayagüez City Hall (a new cupola was added, resembling that of New York City Hall). On June 20, 1919, a fire nearly destroyed the Teatro Yagüez, the town's main theater, killing 92 (some say 150) people. The Teatro was later rebuilt and remodeled twice; it is now Mayagüez's municipal theater.

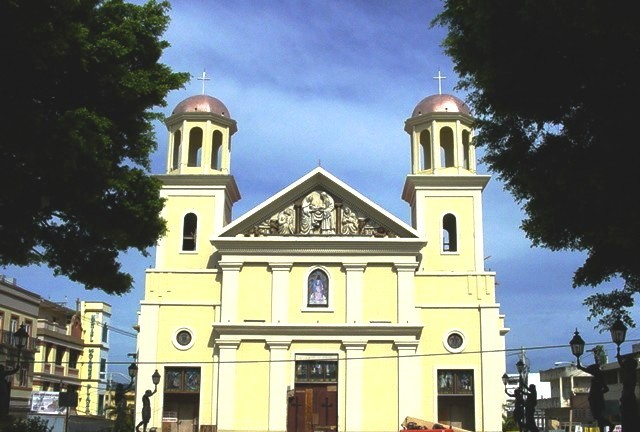
Mayaguez's Nuestra Señora de la Candelaria cathedral, 2005

The city's main Roman Catholic church, Our Lady of the Candelaria (plot consecrated on 21 August 1760, first masonry building erected in 1780, current church originally built in 1836) was rebuilt in 1922. The original redesign by architect Luis Perocier sought to restore the building to its original splendor. Not only had the 1918 earthquake destroyed the temple's ceiling, but a lightning bolt also struck and tore down a wedge-shaped corner of one of its two bell towers. However, lack of proper funding and the extent of the damage of the original structure forced the actual rebuilding of the church to be scaled-down considerably.

Pope Paul VI authorized the founding of the Diocese of Mayagüez on April 1, 1976, which led to the rededication of the church as a cathedral soon after. A few years later the first bishop of the city, Mons. Ulises Casiano Vargas (who assumed the bishop's office on April 30, 1976) led the drive for the cathedral's remodeling following Perocier's original plan; the remodeled cathedral was reopened on January 1, 2004.

Between 1962 and 1998, Mayagüez was a major tuna canning and processing center. At one time, 80% of all tuna products consumed in the United States were packed in Mayagüez (the biggest employer, StarKist, had 11,000 employees working three daily shifts in the local plant's heyday). Mayagüez was also a major textile industry hub; until very recently, almost a quarter of all drill uniforms used by the United States Army were sewn in the city.

A bomb exploded in the Plaza del Municipio during a January 11, 1975, celebration of the birthday of Eugenio María de Hostos hosted by the Puerto Rican Socialist Party. Two activists were killed and ten other people were injured. The Fuerzas Armadas de Liberación Nacional Puertorriqueña attributed the attack to the CIA and the National Front for the Liberation of Cuba (FLNC), and within two weeks, retaliated by bombing the Fraunces Tavern in New York City.

On May 12, 1975, a unit of the Cambodian Khmer Rouge seized a container ship, the SS Mayagüez, on the Gulf of Siam. The botched recovery of the ship's crew on May 15 by a hastily arranged multi-service task force off the island of Koh Tang became known as the Mayagüez Incident, considered by historians as one of president Gerald Ford's first foreign policy setbacks. The ship was owned and operated by Sea-Land Service, which operated container service to Puerto Rico until 1975 and explains why the city's name became entangled in such a major military international incident.

== See also ==
- Timeline of Mayagüez, Puerto Rico
- National Register of Historic Places listings in Mayagüez, Puerto Rico
