= Facultad de Derecho Eugenio Maria de Hostos =

Former law school located in Mayagüez, Puerto Rico

Coordinates: 18°11′59.18″N 67°08′22.16″W

Eugenio María de Hostos School of Law
- Facultad de Derecho Eugenio María de Hostos
- Other names: Hostos Law School; FDEMDH
- Motto: Una institución de Compromiso Social (English: "An institution of Social Commitment")
- Named after: Eugenio María de Hostos
- Founders: Fernando Bayrón Toro; Juan Mari Brás; Carlos Rivera Lugo
- Type: Private
- Active: 1995–2013; 13 years ago
- Parent institution: Fundación Facultad de Derecho Eugenio María de Hostos (English: "Eugenio María de Hostos Law School Foundation")
- Dean: Carlos Rodríguez Sierra (2004–2014); Roberto Vélez Colón (2004); Carlos Rivera Lugo (1993–2003)
- Academic staff: 21
- Students: 148
- Location: 57 South Peral Street – PO Box 1900, Mayagüez, Puerto Rico, 00681-1900
- Campus: Urban
- Language: Spanish
- Anthem: Hostos Hymn on YouTube
- Colours: Turquoise and brown
- Website: Official website (defunct)

The Facultad de Derecho Eugenio Maria de Hostos (English: Eugenio María de Hostos School of Law) was a law school located in Mayagüez, Puerto Rico. The school was founded by Fernando Bayrón, Juan Mari Brás and Carlos Rivera Lugo in 1995. The institution lost its American Bar Association (ABA) accreditation, and then the Puerto Rico Supreme Court also withdrew the accreditation due to school's economic difficulties. After having granted degrees to 900 alumni, Hostos closed in 2013, when the last commencement ceremony had only eight graduates, out of ten students in their final semester. Hostos Law School aspired to achieve the development of legal professionals who were also responsive to the needs of their communities and who would embrace the educational philosophy of its namesake, Eugenio María de Hostos.

== History ==
=== Accreditation ===
On 28 October 1996, the parent institution of the school, the Eugenio María de Hostos Law School Foundation, requested an accreditation extension from the Supreme Court of Puerto Rico. A committee for such a purpose was named by the Court on 20 December. The committee submitted its final report which did not recommend accreditation, on 11 July of the following year. Two observations made by the committee were that the institution lacked the financial means to operate and the academic profiles of its students were subpar compared to other law schools in Puerto Rico.

The American Bar Association (ABA) denied the school's request for a provisional accreditation on 15 July 1997. This was detrimental, since Puerto Rican law requires that to be accepted into the Bar, all persons must have graduated from an ABA-accredited institution. As such, on 13 August, the Supreme Court released a resolution refusing entry into the bar to the first cohorts of graduates. However, the Court also resolved that these graduates were able to take the bar examination in September 1997, to obtain data from the test results. Only 36% of the class passed the exam, compared to 79% of the University of Puerto Rico School of Law, 63% from the Interamerican University School of Law, and 61% of the Pontificial Catholic University of Puerto Rico School of Law graduates on their first attempt.

Consequentially, the Supreme Court released a second resolution indicating concern that Hostos Law School lacked budgetary soundness, had difficulties in recruiting students who were able to pass the bar exam post-graduation, as well as not having obtained the provisional accreditation from ABA. The Supreme Court, on a 4–2 vote on the resolution, gave a second opportunity to Hostos, having been persuaded by a promise from the institution that there would be "significant improvement" on the bar exam results between 1998 and 1999 "if [the Supreme Court] gave said graduates the opportunity of taking the bar examination." If Hostos delivered on its promise, as well as obtained at least one provisional accreditation from ABA in two years' time, then the Supreme Court would grant the requested accreditation. If said requirements were not satisfied, the Court would refuse the accreditation request and not accept any graduates for the bar exam from 2000 on. Additionally, the Court requested that all enrolled students and all students admitted from 1 April 1998 be individually notified of the Court's second resolution and its implications for the school.

A Provisional Accreditation Committee of the ABA, chaired by Dean Leigh H. Taylor of Southwestern Law School visited the institution between 7–10 March 1999.

After the two years lapsed, the institution had not satisfied the two conditions, and had inferior bar exam rates compared to the other three accredited law schools, as well as having been denied the provisional accreditation from ABA for a second time on 24 November 1999.

Bar Examination pass rates
School	Sept 1998	Mar 1999	Sept 1999
University of Puerto Rico	87%	78%	83%
Interamerican University	52%	46%	48%
Pontifical Catholic University	51%	31%	48%
Hostos	19%	0%	22%

The Supreme Court denied the accreditation and stated that no graduates would be permitted to take the bar examinations from 2000 on. However, those who had failed the tests from 1997 to 1999 were able to reattempt the bar examination. The Court wrote that "[a]fter seven years since the founding of the [school], it is not justified for this [Court] to continue favoring its graduates by making exceptions to ... legislative norms and regulations ... that are required of any other applicant." On a particular vote by Associate Justice Jaime Fuster, he mentioned that Hostos had an "irreparable medullar problem" in achieving its goals. He credited this to the incapacity of recruiting students capable of passing the bar examination. Fuster added the results for the law school entrance exam, the Graduate Studies Admissions Test (PAEG, for Prueba de Admisión a Estudios Graduados). The Hostos Law School alleged that they "could not recruit better students for lack of accreditation." Fuster refuted this by suggesting that the most probable cause was the geographic location, where there were not enough students in the region for a fourth law school. Out of all the passing marks of the bar exams offered in the month of September in the years 1997 to 1999, only 12% came from the 16 municipalities in the western region of Puerto Rico, which meant that even if Hostos could recruit all students from the region, it would still be a small part of the general law school market. Of all Hostos graduates who took the bar exam, 54% were not from the region and 85% of those graduates were below the average PAEG score of those who did pass. Even though the cost for three years attendance was at least $100,000, the institution had to resort to donations to keep itself afloat.

Average PAEG scores for all applicants
Year	All applicants	Hostos	University of Puerto Rico
1997	604	532	660
1998	593	504	657
1999	595	509	655

The Hostos Law School did not request a reconsideration from the Supreme Court. On 9 March 2000, the Court expanded the time window to students who had taken the bar exam in March 2000 to be admitted to the bar as well.

==== 2003 provisional accreditation ====
Hostos resubmitted a request for provisional accreditation to the Supreme Court on 13 December 2002. The Court named a Committee of Accreditation, composed of Jorge Pérez Díaz, Esq. (chair); Dr. José R. González; Rafael Martínez, CPA; Dr. Efraín González Tejera; José Sosa Llorens, Esq.; and James P. White (counsel to the committee), former ABA consultant. The committee submitted its final report on 19 June 2003. On 27 June, the Court issued a resolution granting Hostos a five-year provisional accreditation, subject to the following conditions:

- Hostos would have to maintain an admittance policy of a minimum of 500 on the PAEG and from 2003 to 2007, increase to 70% the rate of admitted students with scores over 550.
- By the end of 2003, the school would have to name an associate dean of finance and an associate dean of academic and student affairs, as well as pay its overdue debts and implement realistic financial plans.
- By 30 June 2004, Hostos would have to adopt a professional development plan, whereby the faculty would be able to do their post-graduate studies and investigations in multiple universities.
- Library: The school would have to acquire the necessary law collections and provide them for public use and submit a plan for a permanent library site at its location on Peral Street, since the library was lodged at a rented site on José de Diego Street.
- Bar exam results: From May 2006 on, the rate of graduates who passed the bar exam on their first attempt would not be less than 75% of the lowest score of any of the other three accredited law schools. For the classes of 2007 and 2008, the rate would be 80% and 85%, respectively.
- ABA accreditation: By 31 June 2007, Hostos must have obtained either provisional or permanent accreditation from the ABA.
- Progress reports: The Board of Trustees would have to submit progress reports on all conditions every 31 January and 31 July every year from 2004 on.

All students, then enrolled or who enrolled in the future, would be given a copy of these conditions as well as a Memorandum of Understanding between the Supreme Court and Hostos Law School. In addition, all graduates from December 2003 on would be able to take the bar examinations. Finally, the resolution stated that Hostos had ninety days to submit a proposed plan to offer a course for all those who graduated from September 1999, when it lost its original accreditation, enabling them to take the bar exams.

The final plan for the course, titled "Legislation and Jurisprudence Analysis Preparatory Program", for all those who did graduate when the institution was not accredited, was referred to the Committee of Accreditation set up by the Court. The program consisted of "an intensive study and discussion program of the 13 subjects that are the object of evaluation in the general law examination." Since this cohort of students had below-average PAEG scores and graduated from a non-accredited institution, the Court required that after completing the preparatory course, graduates must be recertified by Hostos. However, the committee rejected the school's proposal that these students obtain at least 70% in the program as a condition for their re-certification. The Court adopted all of the committee's recommendations on 12 March 2004.

=== Attempted revivals ===
In early 2013, Hostos graduate and then-representative María T. González López submitted a joint resolution in an attempt to make Hostos a subsidiary faculty of the University of Puerto Rico, Mayagüez Campus. The joint resolution would have reaffirmed Joint Resolution 500 of 2001, which made Hostos a quasi-public institution as well as instruct both chambers of the legislature as well as the executive branch to name their representatives to the board of trustees and initiate talks with the University of Puerto Rico as well as its Mayagüez Campus to transfer the institution to them so they could salvage it by becoming part of an accredited institution. Additionally, it would have resolved a $1.5 million disbursement from the legislature for Hostos. It was later retracted by González López herself.

In late 2016, the Municipality of Mayagüez and Interamerican University of Puerto Rico (UIPR) signed the first of two agreements to reopen the Hostos Law School. The groups accorded that the UIPR would be able to incorporate the use of the name Hostos to offer continuing education for lawyers, a master's degree in law and a bachelor's in criminal justice. The university would offer an online database as a library to students and would request accreditation so that it would operate as an extension of its law school and their San Germán campus. This new setup would commence offering courses in August 2017. The second agreement, to be signed two weeks after the first one, was to allow the UIPR rehabilitation and use of the Hostos building.

== Building ==
External videos
- The conditions of the school building six months after closing on YouTube

The permanent seat of the Eugenio Maria de Hostos School of Law was located in the building formerly occupied and known as the Luis Muñoz Rivera elementary public school. It was built in 1924, when Juan Rullán Rivera was Mayor of Mayagüez. The site was originally occupied by the Municipal Slaughterhouse during the early 19th century. For this reason the current street of the school, Georgina Morales, was known as La Calle de la Carnicería or 'slaughterhouse street'. By 1848, the municipal prison building was built, which gave its name to the Barrio where the school was located.

The building was designed by Rafael Carmoega, whose other works include the Capitol of Puerto Rico, the School of Tropical Medicine (Escuela de Medicina Tropical), the Antiguo Casino de Puerto Rico, and the first buildings of the University of Puerto Rico, Río Piedras Campus. The architectural style of the building is mostly modernist, with elegant, although reserved, neoclassical accents including its access façade that is a Doric order of columns.

The public elementary school closed down in 1985. The remodeling design of the building was the work of Mayagüez architect Juan Manuel Moscoso. The property was restored and rehabilitated to house the law school by the city during the years 1997 to 1999, under the mayoralty of José Guillermo Rodríguez. The building was inaugurated as the permanent seat of the law school on 7 May 1999. In November 2006, then-governor of Puerto Rico Aníbal Acevedo Vilá, took part in a cornerstone-laying ceremony for a new building to house the law library next to the Hostos building. Acevedo Vilá highlighted the social work offered by Hostos through its legal aid clinic and announced an annual $1.5 million allocation for the building of the library for the next five years, until 2010, creating between 25 and 30 jobs. The building, which would have taken 13 months to complete, would have consisted of a three-storey building with 37,433 square feet (3,477.6 m^{2}) to house Hostos' 180,000 book volumes. In March 2013, a fire started in one of the abandoned residences, however, no persons were affected nor were they evicted. In 2014, after Hostos had its accreditation rescinded for the final time, the mayor Rodríguez requested that the building be returned to the municipality since it had been abandoned and had become a "vandal den".

=== Crime Victims Help Center ===
On 7 July 2020, the municipality and the UIPR announced the use of the Hostos building as the seat of a joint venture to provide a help center for crime victims (CAVIC-May, for Centro de Apoyo a Victimas del Crimen-Mayagüez) of the 23 municipalities in the western and southwestern regions of the island. $846,458 of the funds came from Victims of Crime Act and $211,615 from institutional funds, for a total of $1,058,073. The aim is to provide is assist primary and secondary victims of sex-related crimes in overcoming the damages they suffered as a result of those crimes. The clinic will also provide aid to victims of crimes ranging from arson to discrimination based on intellectual disability, as well as coordinate workshops with other government agencies.

== Competitions ==
Eugenio Maria de Hostos Law School students were winners of the XVIII Miguel Velázquez Rivera Debate Competition, an annual competition held by the UIPR School of Law Review. The competition included students from all law schools in Puerto Rico, and measured legal knowledge matter. Hostos had also won three previous editions of the competition for the years 2001, 2006 and 2009.

Hostos students were also the victors in the inaugural edition of the Enrique Miranda Merced Interuniversity Litigation Competition in 2010, held by the University of Puerto Rico School of Law Litigation Student Association. It counted with participation from both institutions who went head-to-head through two rounds, where Hostos took the role of prosecutors and then the role of the defendants to prove their knowledge and capabilities relating to the criminal code.

== Financial situation ==
The Hostos Law School started off in 1993 with $12,144 of total assets, this reached an all-time high in 2011 of $11,199,337, a year after it had its accreditation rescinded by the Supreme Court of Puerto Rico.

Total assets in dollars

== Ni una vida más para la toga ==
Ni una vida más para la toga (lit. 'Not one more life for the toga') was an academic colloquium sponsored and held by Hostos for the "critical and interdisciplinary reflection particularly on the field[s] of State and Law." Started in 2003 by invitation of Dr. Daniel Nina to his peers to discuss a 1993 essay of the same name by the founding dean Dr. Carlos Rivera Lugo. The name is a play on the anti-drug campaign slogan Ni una vida más para las drogas ('Not one more life for drugs'). Speakers included Noam Chomsky, Enrique Dussel, Boaventura de Sousa Santos, Raúl Zibechi, Óscar Correas, Jesús Alí de la Torre, Edward James Olmos and Samuel Silva Gotay. In 2007 a book of the same name was released by Nina in Utuado containing ten of the speeches given in their inaugural edition.

== Notable faculty ==
- Juan Mari Brás, founder.

== Notable alumni ==
- Eric Alfaro Calero, one-term Representative and last Commissioner of Municipal Affairs.
- José Luis Dalmau Santiago (JD 1997), five term Senator.
- María Teresa González López, one-term Representative.
- Gilberto Rodríguez Valle, one-term Senator.
- Marlese Sifre (JD), Mayor of Ponce.
- Aníbal José Torres (JD 2001), two-term Senator and Chair of the Popular Democratic Party.

== See also ==
- List of defunct law schools in the United States
