= Evelyn Vázquez =

Puerto Rican politician

Evelyn Vázquez Nieves

Member of the Puerto Rico Senate from the Mayagüez-Aguadilla district
- In office 2009–2013
- Preceded by: Carlos Pagán
- In office 2017-2020

Personal details
- Born: Isabela, Puerto Rico
- Party: New Progressive Party
- Other political affiliations: Democratic
- Spouse: Peter Muller Maldonado
- Children: Andrea
- Education: Interamerican University of Puerto Rico (BBA); Phoenix University (MBA)
- Profession: Politician

Evelyn Vázquez Nieves is a former Puerto Rican politician and Senator. She was a member of the Senate of Puerto Rico between 2008 and 2013.

== Early years and studies ==
Evelyn Vázquez was born in the town of Isabela, Puerto Rico. Vázquez obtained her bachelor's degree in administration from the Interamerican University of Puerto Rico - Guayama Campus. She then obtained her master's degree from Phoenix University. Vázquez also completed courses towards a Ph.D. and reached the ABD stage at LoreNNN University.

== Modeling and acting career ==
Vázquez started modeling in 1986. She has participated in several beauty pageants locally and internationally, winning some of them like Mrs. Puerto Rico, Elegant Lady of Puerto Rico, MS American Woman of Puerto Rico 2002. She also participated in pageants like MS American Woman 2000, Miss Latin Look Latina PR, and Miss. Fashion Model PR.

Vázquez claims she appeared in musical videos from Salsa singer Tito Nieves and reggaeton singer Andy Andy. She also said she had an appearance in Daddy Yankee's film Talento de Barrio in 2008.

On September 18, 2001, Vázquez posed in a swimsuit for "El Bombón de Así", a popular centerfold of newspaper Primera Hora.

== Professional career ==
Vázquez began her professional career in 1989 as Director of Isabela's Center for the Elderly. She also worked as Night Director at Benedict School, a school specialized in language, tourism, and hotels, until 1993. She created and managed Isabela's Office of Tourism from 1995 to 2000. In 2001, she founded D'Queens Institute, an art and talent school in Isabela.

== Political career ==
Vázquez participated in the primaries for New Progressive Party senator for the Mayagüez-Aguadilla district celebrated on March 9, 2008. She won a slot for the elections, arriving in second place, with around 600 votes over incumbent senator Carlos Pagán. At the 2008 general elections, Vázquez was elected as senator becoming the first female senator of the Mayagüez-Aguadilla district in the history of Puerto Rico.

On October 4, 2011, Vázquez was involved in a live argument with political commentator, Jay Fonseca, during an interview. During the interview, Fonseca accused Vázquez of using the slogan of a non-profit foundation for her political agenda, and called her a "bad example to the women of Puerto Rico, for previously being a pole dancer." Vázquez said she planned to start legal action against Fonseca for defamation. On October 20, 2011, Vázquez said that Fonseca had sent her a letter asking her for a meeting to apologize, but Vázquez insisted on him apologizing publicly.

On November 10, 2011, it was revealed that the Special Investigations Bureau was investigating Vázquez for irregularities in her management of public funds. The investigation mentions excessive charging of diet allowance, nepotism, and irregularities in the handling of public funds. Puerto Rico's Comptroller Yesmín Valdivieso confirmed she had submitted a complaint to the Senate of Puerto Rico about allegations of Vázquez receiving diet allowance as if she lived in Isabela, when she is currently living in the Condado neighborhood of San Juan, which would make her ineligible to receive such allowance. Vázquez classified the allegations as "absurd" and "gossip".

Vázquez ran again for Senator in the 2012 general elections, but lost to the candidates of the Popular Democratic Party (PPD).

She has hosted a radio (broadcast on 940 AM) and television program titled Mujer No Estás Sola… ¡Rompe El Silencio! (or "Woman You Are Not Alone ... Break The Silence!"). The television program, which started airing on Monday, 15 April 2019, was initially produced by the Puerto Rico Public Broadcasting Corporation and broadcast at 11:00 on WIPR-TV (San Juan) and WIPM (Mayagüez). The first episode was dedicated to Jomayra Hernández Martínez, a 13-year-old girl who was burned by her ex-boyfriend, who would die from her wounds a month later. On Monday, June 17, 2019, Vázquez Nieves hosted an episode titled Elsie… ¡No Estás Sola! (or "Elsie... You Are Not Alone!"), named after a mother and daughter who survived an explosion and fire in their home caused by Hurricane María. On 15 July 2020, after having dealt with 545 cases, it as announced that the show would move to WOLE-DT (Univisión Puerto Rico) and would be broadcast on the 1:30 p.m. time slot.

During July 2019, Vázquez Nieves received a threat through a letter on e-mail to her office in San Juan and later a second one to her Mayagüez office, which she turned into a publicity ploy, stating she will not be intimidated, taking legal action and having it reported to local newspapers. The letter contained a quotation from Tom Holland's popular history book Rubicon: The Triumph and Tragedy of the Roman Republic. The quote, which alluded to the assassination of Julius Caesar, read "Some sixty men stood in a press around him. All of them had drawn daggers from under their togas. All of them were well known to Caesar. Many were former enemies who had accepted his pardon – but even more were friends." In her official judicial filing, Vázquez Nieves stated she felt "insecure, worried and threatened," to which, Col. Henry Escalera Rivera, the Commissioner of the Puerto Rico Police Bureau, said the matter will be investigated, however she would not be given a police escort.

After the effects of Hurricane Dorian in the Bahamas, Vázquez Nieves was scheduled to meet with general assistant of the National Guard, José Reyes and make both a radio telemarathon on the Puerto Rico Public Broadcasting Corporation.

After the House of Representatives introduced a measure to increase the minimum wage, Nieves Vázquez expressed that the minimum wage for private sector employees should be increased from the federal of $7.25 per hours to $9.00. For public sector employees it is $8.25 an hour.

On 22 December 2019, she endorsed Governor Wanda Vázquez's 2020 election campaign, by making a play on Goya Foods slogan, "If it's Wanda, it has to be good."

Amid rumours that Wanda Vázquez would transfer control of the Juan A. Rivero Zoo from the Department of Natural and Environmental Resources to the Municipality of Mayagüez, under José Guillermo Rodríguez, Vázquez Nieves clarified that there was a commitment that by the end of March 2020 the governor would visit the zoo. However, due to the COVID-19 pandemic in Puerto Rico, the meeting was postponed and held on 11 July 2020, where she did not maintain social distance.

Vázquez Nieves was the author of Law 49–2020, which created a hotline for survivors of domestic abuse under the number code 0-0-0. This was criticized by feminist activists as a duplicity of efforts since this new hotline was attached to the Office of the Women's Advocate, which already has such a hotline.

In the aftermath of the Puerto Rico earthquakes a report as part of an investigation accused Vázquez of withholding aid to displaced people and using it as a political tool.

Vázquez Nieves decided to change her aspiration to the senate from a District, to an at-large one. This meant, her votes would come from the whole island instead of a geographical area considered unwinnable from her. On August 16, 2020 she lost the 2020 Primaries of the New Progressive Party as she failed to obtain enough votes to make it to the general election.

In 2020 Evelyn Vázquez was elected as an at-large member of the Democratic Party of Puerto Rico.

== Personal life ==
Vázquez started a relationship with entrepreneur Peter Muller around 2009. Muller, who was married at the time, got divorced on grounds of adultery with Vázquez being singled out as the reason for the divorce. She also has a daughter called Andrea from a previous relationship.

She currently resides at 1 Bondad Street at the Paraíso Urbanization, a gated-community in Mayagüez. Her husband owns a mansion in Caguas at 1 Trinitaria Street in the exclusive neighborhood of Alturas de Caguas.

On 11 October 2019, she was declared by Mayagüez mayor, José Guillermo Rodríguez as a "Favorite Daughter of the City" in a ceremony for such purpose held at the Teatro Yagüez.

In mid 2020, a Twitter thread went viral comparing Vázquez Nieves' dress sense to that of Peruvian singer La Tigresa del Oriente.

=== Wedding to Peter Muller Maldonado ===
External videos of the ceremony
- Highlights of the wedding ceremony
- Arrival of the bride and ceremony
- Photographs session and speech from second floor of the Town Hall

During some time before December 2016, Muller Maldonado proposed to Vázquez Nieves during a formal dinner at the La Concha's

Perla Restaurant in Condado. It was revealed two weeks before the ceremony that it would be held at the main plaza of downtown Mayagüez, with entertainment by Glenn Monroig and the toast would be made by then-governor-elect, Ricardo Rosselló. The menu, which had the initials of the couple on the letterhead and a large clear rhinestone underneath, listed roasted succulent pig shank, pigeons peas, "grandma's rice" and potato salad. She had always believed that her wedding would be a "village wedding" and had jointly decided with Muller Maldonado that it would be a "Christmas gift, and as a token of appreciation to the constituents" and that she would stay with the general public until at least 6:30 pm The ceremony, which was officiated by Pastor Lydia Pagán, was held in a blue carpet gazebo in front of the Mayagüez City Hall, built especially for the occasion and decorated with white flowers, roses, hydrangeas, calla lilies and petunias, in front of 250 guests. They had music and food for all members of the general public who attended. The ceremony was supposed to start at 4:00 pm on Saturday, December 17, 2016, however, neither the couple nor the guests had arrived since there was some light rain. Special attention was given by the guests to PPD Mayagüez mayor, José Guillermo Rodríguez, who sported a blue shirt and tie, the colors of the PNP, to the ceremony, where afterwards Rosselló, who was accompanied by his wife Beatriz Rosselló, joked about it. Vázquez Nieves left the Howard Johnson hotel close by on a white horse drawn buggy to the ceremony, which was hosted by actor Edgardo Huertas. Vázquez Nieves was escorted down the aisle by her mother, Matilde Nieves and had her daughter, Andrea, as maid of honor. Also in her bridal entourage were her niece, Pamela, her goddaughter, Kathia, as well as her two nephews, Diego and José Luis. The rings were carried by a younger relation, Destiny. The godparents of the wedding were Yanitzia Irizarry and Efraín Acevedo. José Juan Tañón sang "Avemaría" and "Cuán grande es él" during the ceremony. Throughout the whole event Vázquez Nieves had three wedding dresses, two of them with mantilla, from Radel's Novia in San Sebastián, and four different hairstyles by Pedro Machado. The wedding reception was held at the old Casino of Mayagüez.
