= Bust of José de Diego =

Bronze bust in Mayagüez, Puerto Rico

José de Diego
- Artist: Francisco Vázquez Díaz
- Year: 1961
- Medium: Bronze
- Subject: José de Diego
- Location: University of Puerto Rico at Mayagüez, Mayagüez, Puerto Rico
- 18.20670817°N 67.1399830°W
- Owner: Disputed

José de Diego is a bronze bust by Compostela located in front of the original entrance to the University of Puerto Rico, Mayagüez Campus in Mayagüez, Puerto Rico, honoring politician and writer José de Diego (1866–1918), who as representative of Mayagüez and speaker to the House of Delegates, was one of the three co-founders of the campus.

== History ==
In 1959, the Movimiento Estudiantil Pro Monumento a José de Diego (Pro Monument for José de Diego Student Movement) was formed by Lillian González y Narciso Rabell, with the help of their counselor, professor Loida Figueroa, to "pay the well-deserved honor to the man to whom we owe the founding of CAAM". With the blessings of the Student Dean and the Instituto de Cultura Puertorriqueña (ICP), the organization set out to raise $800.00 and were able to collect $197.00 during the fall semester enrollment day. They also sent out letters to fraternities, sororities and other student-led groups encouraging them to donate as well. The then-student newspaper, Campus (1958–1968), stated "[w]e believe that, since campaigns like this give prestige, dignity and seriousness to the Colegio student body, no student should remain without giving their economic cooperation."

On 30 March 1960, the newspaper again reminded students of the needed funds by quoting excerpts of the letter sent to the campus organizations. After collections were made on two successive enrollment days, these were suspended since they were found to be in violation of a regulation that prohibited such actions in said events. The money raised totalled $520.00, which was deposited in a Banco Crédito y Ahorro Ponceño account and sent to Dr. Ricardo Alegría, Director of the ICP. The ICP would make up the difference since the money collected was not enough for the bust or pedestal. The ICP made it part of a larger project, drawing up plans to set up a small park on the median strip in front of the Alpha Beta Chi (ABX) chapter house, which was ceded to the ICP by the Puerto Rico Planning Board so that the Puerto Rico Department of Transportation and Public Works could rehabilitate the area for said purpose.

On the first of October 1961 the bust, work of the sculptor Compostela, was finally unveiled. It could not be a full-body sculpture since de Diego had to have his leg amputated due to gangrene and would have been considered in bad taste to portray that. The front of the pedestal reads:

José de Diego 1866 - 1917. Los Estudiantes del Colegio de Agricultura y Artes Mecánicas de Mayaguez, y el Instituto de Cultura Puertorriqueña. -1961

José de Diego 1866 - 1917. The Students of the College of Agriculture and Mechanical Arts of Mayagüez, and the Institute of Puerto Rican Culture. -1961

— Source

And the back has another plaque bearing the message:

A José de Diego - Fundador de nuestro Colegio - Parlamento Estudiantil

To José de Diego - Founder of our College - Student Parliament

— Source

The benches in the park were donated by the Pro-Independence University Federation of Puerto Rico (FUPI), Nu Sigma Beta (ΝΣΒ) and C. O. P. U. The unveiling ceremony commenced with Elpidio H. Rivera, in representation of Mayagüez mayor, Hon. Baudilio Vega Berríos, who was sick, giving a talk on the importance of de Diego in the history of Puerto Rico. Juan Rodríguez Cruz, speaking for the students, thanked the university administration and the ICP and stated that credit for founding the university campus was also due to David W. May and Carmelo Alemar, the latter of whom was present as guest of honor. Rey Francisco Quiñones recited de Diego's Agnus Crucis (Lamb's Cross), Última actio (Final Act) and En la brecha (In the gap), which were included in a program made for the event which also contained a short biography. J. A. González thanked all who partook in the donating and working for the monument and officially dissolved the organization in name of its counsellor, Loida Figueroa, who was in Spain at the time. Dr. Alegría closed the event by transferring ownership of the monument to the municipal authorities, though, he stated that it was really in the hands of the students so they "could take care of it and serve as inspiration." During the night a ceremony was held in the City Hall's ceremony room with the reciting of de Diego poems by Iris Martínez and the performing of folkloric songs by soprano Luisita Rodríguez with Alfredo Romero at the piano.

In 2012, the Mayagüez chapter of the Puerto Rican Independence Party (PIP), led by its president, Dr. José Javier Muñiz, went to the bust to commemorate the 146th anniversary of de Diego's birth. The PIP Mayagüez Committee had been hoisting an 1895 original version of the flag of Puerto Rico on a flagpole near the monument for the past 15 years. Until the University of Puerto Rico at Mayagüez celebrated its centenary year, the administration had maintained the upkeeping of the monument, however, on that year they stated it was not their responsibility. Since then the PIP Mayagüez Committee, with the help of the Hostosian National Independence Movement (MINH), has maintained the green areas and every April 16 holds a ceremony in honor of de Diego.
