= Gotay (surname) =

Gotay is a surname. Notable people with the surname include:

- Gotay, American singer and songwriter
- Julio Gotay, Puerto Rican professional baseball player
- Gretchen Gotay, Puerto Rican former swimmer
- Rubén Gotay, Puerto Rican former professional baseball infielder
- Samuel Silva Gotay, sociologist of religion of Puerto Rico and Latin America
- Valerie Gotay, former judoka from the United States
