= Juan Rullán Rivera =

Puerto Rican mayor

Mayor of Mayagüez, Puerto Rico
- In office 1921–1932
- Preceded by: Alejandro Galanes
- Succeeded by: Alfonso González Martínes

Personal details
- Born: November 19, 1884 Mayagüez, Puerto Rico
- Died: Unknown
- Party: Alianza Puertoriqueña
- Spouse: Dolores Cuebas
- Children: Lolita Eneida Rullán de Rúa
- Profession: politician

Juan "Juanin" Rullán Rivera (born 1884) was a farmer and a Puerto Rican politician who served as the Mayor of the city of Mayagüez, Puerto Rico. Juan Rullán was born on November 19, 1884, in the Juan Alonso Barrio of Mayagüez; his parents were Juan Rullán and Ramona Rivera. He had his primary education in "El Liceo de Mayagüez".

== Political career ==
When he got involved in politics, he began as a follower of Antonio R. Barcelo, but it did not take long for him to become its standard bearer in Mayagüez. He was nominated and elected mayor of Mayagüez in 1920, winning by 2,111 votes. He won again in the 1924 elections, being nominated by the newly established "Alianza Puertoriqueña" Party, winning over the Coalitión candidate Rafael Marange by over 4,000 votes. He again won in the 1928 elections, also being nominated by the Aliancista Party, winning over Coalitión candidate Alfonso González by only 425 votes.

As mayor of the city, he was involved in numerous projects. He built a new aqueduct with a modern filtration plant under the direction of Ing. Monsiur Lefranc. He also built the new Mayagüez City Hall under the direction of the engineers/architects Adriano González Martínez, Alonso Aguilar and Ignacio Flores. Under his terms as mayor, other projects were also built, such as the Luis Muñoz Rivera Park, he converted the old municipal jail into the Muñoz Rivera School, which now serves as the Hostos School of Law, he rebuilt the historic San Antonio Hospital, and he also rebuilt the Mariano Riera Palmer School which had been mostly destroyed by the earthquake of 1918. During his second term as mayor, he had almost all the main streets of the city paved with tar, later on, the streets were paved with concrete.

== Personal life ==
Juanín Rullán married doña Dolores Cuebas, who was also from Mayagüez. They only had one daughter, named Lolita Eneida Rullán de Rúa.

== See also ==
- Politics of Puerto Rico
