= Iván Rodríguez Traverzo =

Member of the Puerto Rico House of Representatives

Iván A. Rodríguez Traverso

Member of the Puerto Rico House of Representatives from the 16th District
- In office January 2, 2009 – December 10, 2010
- Preceded by: Sergio Ortíz Quiñones
- Succeeded by: Eric Alfaro

Personal details
- Born: Iván Ariel Rodríguez Traverso; September 29, 1975 (age 51) San Juan, Puerto Rico
- Party: New Progressive Party
- Education: University of Puerto Rico
- Profession: Basketball player sportscaster

Iván Ariel Rodríguez Traverso (born September 29, 1975) is a Puerto Rican politician who served as a Member of the House of Representatives of Puerto Rico. He represented the 16th Representative District, composed of the towns of Isabela, San Sebastian, and Las Marías. Traverzo is affiliated with the pro-statehood New Progressive Party of Puerto Rico (NPP).

Traverso first ran for office at the 2004 elections, but he lost to the opposing candidate. However, on the 2008 elections, he ran again and won.

He was expelled from the House of Representatives on December 10, 2010, after accusations of bribery, becoming only the fourth legislator to be expelled from the Puerto Rico Legislative assembly. During the trial against him, he was briefly represented by former PNP legislator, Nicolás Nogueras.

On January 27, 2012, an arrest warrant was issued against Rodríguez Traverso for 8 charges of corruption. He was arrested on January 31, 2012.
