= Manuel Marín Gaudier =

Mayor of Mayagüez, Puerto Rico

Mayor of Mayagüez, Puerto Rico
- In office 1937–1941
- Preceded by: Dr. Frank Olán Rivera
- Succeeded by: Julio N. Matos

Personal details
- Born: Mayagüez, Puerto Rico
- Party: Alianza Puertoriqueña
- Profession: politician

Manuel Marín Gaudier born in Barrio Salud, in Mayagüez, Puerto Rico. He was Mayor of Mayagüez from 1937 to 1941. His parents were Juan Marin and Rosalia (Chalía) Gaudier. He studied in the "Escuela de la Calle de la Rosa".

== Political career ==
Before becoming Mayor of Mayagüez, Marín was president of the municipal assembly of Mayaguez for sixteen consecutive years. In his run as mayor his projects included among others: the building of the Anti-Tuberculosis Hospital in Cerro las Mesas; the "Hogar Infantil"; he bought the Mayagüez Light; he built 70 percent of the paved roads in the city; the rain sewer system; the Santurce barriada; the Roosevelt School; and many other projects.

== See also ==
- Politics of Puerto Rico
