= Eric Alfaro =

Puerto Rican politician

Eric Alfaro Calero

Member of the Puerto Rico House of Representatives from the 16th District
- In office April 11, 2011 – January 1, 2013
- Preceded by: Iván Rodríguez Traverzo
- Succeeded by: José Rodríguez Quiles

Personal details
- Born: October 3, 1982 (age 43) Moca, Puerto Rico
- Party: New Progressive Party (PNP)
- Education: University of Puerto Rico at Mayagüez (BA); Eugenio María de Hostos School of Law (JD)

Eric Adniel Alfaro Calero (born October 3, 1982) is a Puerto Rican politician affiliated with the New Progressive Party (PNP). He was a member of the Puerto Rico House of Representatives from April 11, 2011, to January 1, 2013, representing District 16. Alfaro was appointed to fill the vacant seat of expelled representative Iván Rodríguez Traverzo.

== Early years and studies ==
Eric Alfaro Calero was born on October 3, 1982, in Moca, but was raised in Isabela.

Alfaro graduated from Heriberto Domenech High School in 2000, receiving the Ceferino Cordero Award which is given to the student with the highest GPA. He then continued studying at the University of Puerto Rico at Mayagüez, where he completed a bachelor's degree in political science. During that time, he was part of the Exchange Program, which allowed him to take courses of international relations at the Universidad Complutense de Madrid in Spain.

After finishing his bachelor's degree, Alfaro began studying at the Eugenio María de Hostos School of Law in Mayagüez, where he obtained a Juris doctor.

== Public service ==
After graduating, Alfaro served as legislative aide of the Government Commission of the House of Representatives of Puerto Rico, under the presidency of Jenniffer González. He was later promoted to legislative aide II at the Office of Legislative Services of the Capitol of Puerto Rico. In 2010, he became director of the Legislative Works Unit.

Alfaro is also a certified mediator for the Supreme Court of Puerto Rico, and is also vice president of the Lion's Club of Isabela.

== Political career ==
On April 3, 2011, Alfaro was elected to fill a vacant seat at the House of Representatives of Puerto Rico representing District 16. He was sworn in April 11.

Despite winning at the 2012 PNP primaries, Alfaro was defeated at the general elections that same year by José Rodríguez Quiles, from the Popular Democratic Party.
