= Baudilio Vega Berríos =

Former mayor of the city of Mayagüez, Puerto Rico

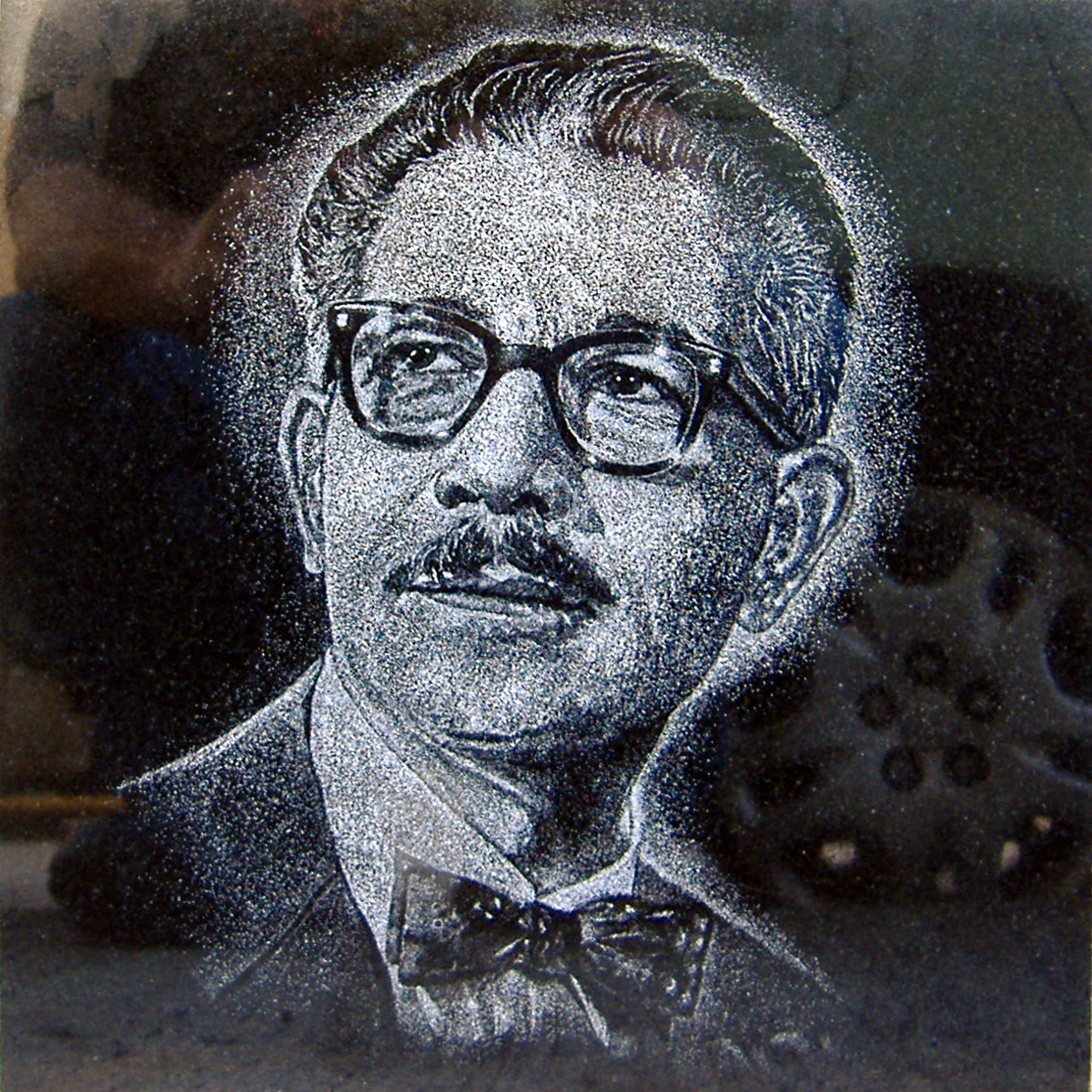
Hand etched portrait on black granite of the late former Mayor of Mayagüez, Baudilio Vega Berríos by artist Osvaldo Torres AKA Cruzacalles.

Baudilio Vega Berríos (February 16, 1902 – August 1987) was Mayor of the city of Mayagüez, Puerto Rico.

Vega Berríos was born in Barrio Pulguillas in Coamo. His mother was Basilisa Berríos Zayas and his father was Baudilio Vega who was from Pulguillas. He had five siblings, Ruben, Lucila, Anibal, Áurea and Leodovina Vega Berrios.

In 1920, he served in the Department of the interior and later in 1926 he joined the Puerto Rico Police Department. By 1932, he was the officer in charge of Old San Juan. In 1934 he arrived in Mayaguez and he accepts a post on the American Railroad Co. where he served from 1939 to 1946. In 1946 he is called upon by Luis Muñoz Marín, then president of the Senate of Puerto Rico and of the Popular Democratic Party of Puerto Rico, to assume the office of Mayor of Mayagüez, he occupied the post until 1952.

From 1952 to 1956 he was a member of the House of Representatives of Puerto Rico and a member of the Constitutional Convention of Puerto Rico. Then from 1956 till 1968 he served once again as mayor of Mayagüez.

== Legacy ==
The Cultural Center in Mayagüez now bears his name.

Political offices
Preceded by Manuel A. Barreto	Mayor of Mayagüez, Puerto Rico; 1947–1952	Succeeded by Augusto Valentín Vizcarrondo

Political offices
Preceded by Augusto Valentín Vizcarrondo	Mayor of Mayagüez, Puerto Rico; 1957–1968	Succeeded by Bejamín Cole
