= José Rodríguez Quiles =

Puerto Rican politician

José "Tony" Rodríguez Quiles

Member of the Puerto Rico House of Representatives from the 16th District
- In office January 2, 2013 – January 2, 2017
- Preceded by: Eric Alfaro
- Succeeded by: Félix G. Lassalle Toro

Member of the Municipal Assembly of San Sebastián, Puerto Rico
- In office 2004-2008

Personal details
- Born: January 6, 1965 (age 61) San Sebastián, Puerto Rico
- Party: Popular Democratic Party (PPD)
- Education: Pontifical Catholic University of Puerto Rico School of Law (JD)

José Antonio "Tony" Rodríguez Quiles is a Puerto Rican politician affiliated with the Popular Democratic Party (PPD). He was elected to the Puerto Rico House of Representatives in 2012 to represent District 16. He is a member of Phi Sigma Alpha fraternity.
