= Benjamín Cole =

Puerto Rican politician

Mayor of Mayagüez, Puerto Rico
- In office 1969–1992
- Preceded by: Baudilio Vega Berríos
- Succeeded by: José Guillermo Rodríguez

Member of the Puerto Rico House of Representatives from the 21th District
- In office January 2, 1960 – January 2, 1964
- Succeeded by: Eudaldo Báez García

Personal details
- Born: October 8, 1919 Mayagüez, Puerto Rico
- Died: January 30, 1993 (aged 73)
- Party: Popular Democratic Party
- Education: University of Puerto Rico (BBA)
- Profession: politician

Benjamín Cole Vázquez (October 8, 1919 – January 30, 1993) was a Puerto Rican politician and the second longest serving Mayor of the city of Mayagüez, Puerto Rico (1969–1993). He is regarded as one of the strongest leaders of the Popular Democratic Party of Puerto Rico (PDP). He was also a U.S. Postal Service regional administrator, legislator, and composer (Tito Puente recorded one of his songs, although, in that regard, Cole is much better known for being the brother of composer Roberto Cole).

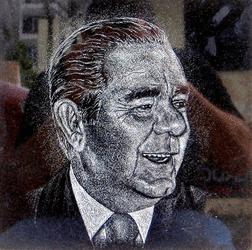
Etching of Benjamín Cole by artist Osvaldo Torres at Cruzacalles using photo shown above.

== Ancestry ==
Benjamin Cole's father Frank belonged to an English family that emigrated to the United States when he was just a child. As an adult, Frank traveled to Puerto Rico when the United States established a provisional government there following its invasion of the island during the Spanish–American War of 1898. Cole was employed in the Federal Courts in San Juan, where he served as translator and marshall. He married Isabel Maria Vazquez, daughter of a prominent attorney from the city of Ponce. The couple established their home in Mayaguez. Belisa, as she was known to her family and friends, was a music teacher who taught her children to play piano, guitar, and other instruments from an early age. She and Frank had three sons, Robert, Benjamin and Lester, divorcing after the birth of the third one. Several years after their divorce Frank retired to San Jose, California, where he lived until his death. His last name took on the Spanish pronunciation and "Cole" became [ˈkole].

== Political beginnings ==
Benjamin Cole had an interest in politics from a very early age, starting with an inclination towards the liberal tendencies of the leaders that favored independence for the island. He was one of the youngest members of the original Partido Popular Democratico when it was founded in 1938, and since then followed the leadership of Luis Munoz Marin.

Early in his career, Cole worked as a civil servant and served as postmaster general of Mayagüez. He received a national Postmaster of the Year award. In 1960, he ran for elected office for the first time, seeking a seat in the Puerto Rico House of Representatives. His campaign used slogans, electronic media, and an organized political network, helping him gain visibility within the Popular Democratic Party and Puerto Rico’s political scene. He won the election and later became known for his public speaking, debating, and media appearances.

Cole coined a phrase to depict the PDP's esprit de corps that is still used to this day: "¡Fuego Popular!" ("Popular Fire"), a play on words that capitalized on the PDP's traditional campaign color (red), and the fact that the strength of his political power was in fact the average citizen. Some political historians claim that Luis Negrón López's poor acceptance levels as PDP gubernatorial candidate in 1968 were a direct consequence of Cole's use of the phrase "¡Juégame el 315!" ("Play me 315") to depict him as a numbers game runner or "bolitero".

Cole won the election for mayor of Mayagüez in 1968, and was subsequently reelected in 1972, 1976, 1980, 1984 and 1988. He won these contests using the same political tactics that, in part, derailed Negrón's candidacy. Cole's strongest contender for the Mayagüez mayoralship, Jan García, was depicted by Cole as a "fake", since, in Cole's view, Dr. Garcia misrepresented himself to the citizens of Mayagüez by using the prefix "Dr." (most voters had assumed Dr. Garcia was a medical doctor, when in fact he had a Ph.D. in Chemistry and was also a Juris Doctor). In Cole's view, Dr. Garcia's unwillingness to clarify this misrepresented him to the general voter. In another mayoral contest, Cole is known for saying: "I'd say my opponent is a thief and a liar... but I don't use that kind of language!".

Benjamin Cole was a populist, often relating to the social needs of the poor and working classes of his city. This earned him many political enemies, from inside and outside his political party. His administration was repeatedly accused of corruption, and cleared of most charges. One accusation that was not cleared, involved a person on city payroll working at the local PDP party clubhouse, although the charges behind this were also politically skewed and only settled many years after Cole's death.

== Slogans and campaign strategies ==
Cole's main campaign strategies captured the essence of him as a populist, and tried to appeal to working-class people, picturing him as their "working class mayor". He made frequent use of slang phrases and slogans, and made a point of using simple language in public while almost always speaking in the third-person while describing his accomplishments. He appealed to common sense when describing current events and explaining public administration strategies, something that political observers acknowledged as being extremely effective, while critics dismissed as demagogy.

An example of his style of campaigning is evidenced by his self-made political slogans. On latter campaigns for reelection, Cole's simple campaign motto was "Cole sigue" ("Cole continues"). Cole's best known musical jingle, a march, was composed by him; its main refrain: "Porque Cole es el alcalde / que ha hecho más por Mayagüez / decimos con alegria: Cole sigue en la alcaldia" ("Since Cole is the mayor / who has done the most for Mayagüez / we gladly say / Cole goes on at City Hall") was featured in his weekly campaign TV show. In one airing, the show opened with the children from his family (his own kids, nieces and nephews) singing the jingle.

Cole made extensive use of electronic media for campaigning, and refused to use posters, flyers or painted signs as part of his campaign propaganda, since he felt like such use would make his city dirty. Instead, he focused on neighborhood-specific community "rallies" and meetings, loudspeaker vehicles, television, radio and media outlets.

On the other hand, Cole's political organization in Mayagüez was perceived by many to be the strongest of any mayoral candidate in Puerto Rico. Some of his ward leaders claim (to this day) to know the political affiliation of every one of their neighbors, a tactic that could allow scientific targeting of voters by background.

== Cole's Mayagüez ==
Cole's skill for strategy served him well in office. One of his landmark accomplishments, which guaranteed that Mayaguez would receive federal funding on a scale otherwise reserved for major cities, was his handling of the city's status under the US Census. The Census Bureau separates cities with more than 100,000 inhabitants and these are granted higher federal funding as a way to guarantee economic development. In the first census during Cole's tenure, Mayaguez came short by about 7,000 people from reaching that mark. Cole argued, successfully, that the city's population status should be increased by counting the students at the University of Puerto Rico Mayaguez campus, who at the time were about 8,000. This kind of creativity allowed the city to receive hundreds of thousands of dollars more for public projects that would not have been given if Cole had not come up with such an argument, which is viewed by some as proof of Cole's entrepreneur spirit for financing his programme. One of the major benefits of this determination came in the form of federal grants which allowed for urban development, most importantly Villa Sultanita, a housing complex created to help middle-class families own a home through municipal subsidies.

During his first term as Mayor of Mayaguez Cole cemented the loyalty of the mass of voters by making certain that no community, however isolated or populated, was left without electricity, running water or proper sewage systems. He also established a dam system for the Yaguez River, which used to flood frequently, often destroying property in the city. This in itself dramatically improved life in the urban areas. Cole authored the law that created the Mayaguez Zoo (first and only zoo in Puerto Rico and the Caribbean) when he was a legislator. Cole put emphasis in public works, improving local roads and pressuring the state legislature for funds to maintain state roads. As well, his administration developed many local landmarks in Mayagüez, including the Palacio de Recreación y Deportes (the local sports arena), the Parque de los Próceres (Mayagüez's largest park), the Ciudad del Retiro, the only independent living complex for moderate income seniors in the area, two public transportation terminals, a multi-storied parking garage, the Asilo de Beneficencia (better known for being the first home of Salvador Agron) and the Plaza del Mercado, the local site for the farmer's and produce market.

The Cole administrations demolished two slums (the Palmita section of Barrio Barcelona, traditionally a municipal dump since the mid-1840s, and the Rabo del Buey slum in downtown Mayagüez) and promoted community redevelopment of these areas. He also promoted tourism with projects such as the acquisition and reconstruction of the Teatro Yagüez (the local municipal theater) and the remodeling of the city's center square -the Plaza Colón- and Mayagüez City Hall. Children from all over the Caribbean continue to come to play today in a state of the art Little League baseball stadium where many inter nation tournaments have been held. One of the achievements that made Cole proudest was the municipal hospital, which had been a bare bones facility with very little to offer other than the simplest primary care, and under his tenure became a secondary, and in some cases, like pediatrics, a tertiary care facility, with the most advanced equipment in the area. Mayagüez was repeatedly awarded the status of Puerto Rico's Cleanest City during Cole's tenure. Most recent development projects in Mayagüez have centered around "renovating" the projects developed by Cole or developing projects that Cole left in early stages of completion.

== Family ==
Benjamín Cole had four children with his first wife, music teacher (and long-time organist for the Roman Catholic cathedral of Mayagüez) Angelina Simón. His sons with Simón were all professional musicians at one time or another, while his daughter was the voice-over announcer for WIPM-TV, the Public Broadcasting Service (PBS) Public television station in the city. None were involved in politics. From this marriage there are many grandchildren, several involved in music like their grandparents, most notably Henry Cole, a famous percussionist and composer. Graduated from the University of Puerto Rico in 1957 with a Bachelor's Degree in Business Administration Commercial Administration with a specialization in accounting.

Cole's second wife was his closest political partner and according to many his "secret weapon" in his long, and undefeated career in Puerto Rico's political world. She served as an advisor and co-campaigner, Nereida Falto de Cole gained a reputation for being a blunt political operative and a capable and strict public administrator. A figure of influence in her own right, Nereida was known as the operational, and grass roots arm to Benjamin's political efforts. She retired from a long career in government, where she was the first woman to head a public corporation in Puerto Rico, the now defunct CRUV for public housing.

At times, political adversaries tried to gain leverage from the fact that Nereida wielded so much influence in her husband's administration and campaigns. It was public knowledge that Nereida was involved in the majority of Cole's projects from their inception, helping him devise development strategies and proving a valuable ally with the oversight of operations, which was one of her areas of expertise. Given that she was such a knowledgeable public officer and speaker on her own, some went so far as to claim that Cole was merely a front man for his wife, and that the city of Mayagüez was being run by a woman (at a time when sexism was prevalent in politics and public life in Puerto Rico). Cole turned this claim into a boon for his campaign, admitting that by voting for him the city was getting two excellent leaders for the price of one.

Cole's public acknowledgment of his wife as his most trusted advisor was an innovation in Puerto Rican politics that had not occurred before or since. However, the couple's teamwork in the city's affairs gained the full trust of voters and supporters, and the recognition and admiration of the political leaders of both parties. In matters of economic development, she was consulted and granted deference by the presidents of her party and those of the opposition. In fact, in his study of the trajectory and success of Cole's career, Professor Jorge Heine found that one of the key elements in Cole's accomplishments was his wife's involvement in his political and public affairs. After Cole's death, many people in the city and in the Popular Party asked Mrs. Cole to run for mayor of Mayagüez, but she declined, preferring to work in favor of the dispossessed from the non-profit sector as well as an entrepreneur in housing management and development.

From his marriage to Nereida, Cole had three other children. The oldest, Nereida Ines, was employed by Senate President Miguel Hernandez Agosto and by the commonwealth's Cultural Institute. She was admired for her radio broadcasting during political campaigns, in which she showed the same wit and mordancy her father was known for. The second daughter, Evelyn, was a precocious public speaker and political organizer, tapped by Governor Rafael Hernandez Colon to run a cabinet-level state agency at the age of 21, the youngest person in Puerto Rico to occupy such a position. Long expected to follow in her father's political footsteps, Evelyn, who is also an award-winning poet and writer, retired from public life in 1988. The youngest of the three, Harold Benjamin, is a commercial airline captain who flies internationally and has never been involved in public life.

== Cole's Legacy ==
Some political observers have likened Cole's political campaigning style as a cross between those of George A. Smathers (in both his speaking style and way to address opponents) and Richard J. Daley. Cole's political acumen and strong populist government made him the subject of a biographical book, Benjamin Cole - the Last Cacique: Leadership and Politics in a Puerto Rican City (a book of published by the University of Pittsburgh Press in 1994). The book was written by the current Chilean ambassador to India (also a former ambassador to South Africa), and former professor at the University of Puerto Rico - Mayaguez, Jorge Heine.

Puerto Rico Highway 64 in Mayagüez was named Benjamín Cole Avenue.

== See also ==
- List of Puerto Ricans

Political offices
Preceded by Baudilio Vega Berríos	Mayor of Mayagüez, Puerto Rico; 1969 - 1992	Succeeded by José Guillermo Rodríguez
