= Samuel Silva Gotay =

Puerto Rican historian (1935)

- Born: August 14, 1935 (age 90); Ponce, Puerto Rico
- Scientific career
- Fields: Sociology
- Institutions: University of Puerto Rico

Samuel Silva Gotay is a sociologist of religion of Puerto Rico and Latin America.

== Education ==
Brought up in a Protestant tradition, he became active in the ecumenical movement during his student days. In 1955 he became member of the executive committee of the World Christian Student Federation, the oldest ecumenical movement in the world. He holds degrees from the University of Puerto Rico, Río Piedras Campus, Yale University and the Universidad Nacional Autónoma de México. He is a Retired Distinguished Professor in the Faculty of Social Sciences at the University of Puerto Rico, Río Piedras Campus.

== Professional career ==
Since early in professional work, he developed an interest in the social dimension of the Christian tradition and participated in social justice movements. Following his first two years as a professor at the University of Puerto Rico, he studied theology and sociology or religion at Yale University, and became the student pastor at the UPR and director of the Higher Education Office of the Council of Churches in Puerto Rico. In 1967 he served as executive director of the Foundation of Community Development, leading the "Volunteers in service to Puerto Rico"(VESPRA) group.

He became associate dean of students at the University of Puerto Rico, Río Piedras Campus in charge of cultural and students affairs. Two years later he returned to Mexico to pursue a doctoral degree on Latin American studies. His dissertation was on the origins of Liberation Theology. After returning from México, Silva-Gotay taught in the Department of Interdisciplinary Studies of Faculty of Social Sciences, the Department of History of the Faculty of Humanities and in the Center for Advance Studies of Puerto Rico and the Caribbean in San Juan, Puerto Rico.

== Current academic interests ==
The current focus of his research and scholarship is on the use the categories of "liberation theology" to understand the history and sociology of religion in Puerto Rico. Most of his recent publications are in sociology of religion in Puerto Rico and Latin America. He was appointed Coordinator for the Caribbean of CEHILA: Comisión de Estudios de Historia de la Iglesia de América Latina, CEHILA is a project of Latino American historians, related to Theology of Liberation, established to produce a 12 volume history of the Church from the perspective of Latin America with a focus on social justice.

== Books ==
- El pensamiento cristiano revolucionario en América Latina y el Caribe: implicaciones de la teología de la liberación para la sociología de la religión. Puerto Rico: Cordillera : Ediciones Sígueme, 1983. 2nd edition.
- Christendum und Revolution in Lateinamerika und der Karibik. Berlin: Peter Lang, 1995. Trad. Universität Würzburg.
- O pensamento cristao revolucionario na America Latina e no Caribe. São Paulo, Trad. Ed. Paulinas, 1986.
- Historia de la Iglesia en el Caribe, (Armando Lampe and Samuel Silva Gotay) Cehila y Universidad de Quinatana Roo, México, 1995.
- Protestantismo Evangélico y Política en Puerto Rico: 1898-1930 Volumen I(Editorial Universidad de P. R., four editions, 1997, 1998, 2005, 2023).
- Catolicismo y política en Puerto Rico bajo España y Estados Unidos: siglos XIX y XX (Editorial Universidad de Puerto Rico, 2005).
- Soldado católico en guerra de religión: Religión y política en España y Puerto Rico en el siglo XIX. Río Piedras, P.R.: Publicaciones Gaviota, 2012.
- La Iglesia Católica de Puerto Rico en el proceso político de la americanización: 1898-1930. San Juan: Publicaciones Gaviota, 2012.
- Mas allá del saber esta el amor: Dr. Carlos Albizu Miranda, Artífice de la psicología multicultural, (Samuel Silva Gotay, Raúl Mayo Santana, and Nieve de los Ángeles Vázquez Lazo) San Juan: Publicaciones Gaviota, 2014.
- El Sexo en la Iglesia, (Samuel Silva Gotay, Luis N Rivera Negrón, and César Augusto Salcedo Chirinos) San Juan: Publicaciones Gaviota, 2015.

== On the author ==
- La religión en América Latina: Sociedad y teoría. (by Enrique López Oliva) Centro de Estudios sobre América, La Habana, Cuba, 1980.

== Family life ==
He is married to Jovita Caraballo, has three children and eight grandchildren.
