= Jorge Heine =

Chilean politician

Ambassador of Chile to China
- In office 11 March 2014 – 20 October 2017
- President: Michelle Bachelet
- Preceded by: Luis Schmidt Montes
- Succeeded by: Jaime Chomalí

Minister of National Assets
- In office 13 April 1999 – 29 July 1999
- President: Eduardo Frei Ruíz-Tagle
- Preceded by: Adriana Delpiano
- Succeeded by: Sergio Galilea

Undersecretary of Aviation
- In office 1 April 1993 – 10 March 1994
- President: Patricio Aylwin
- Preceded by: Mario Fernández Baeza
- Succeeded by: Mario Fernández Baeza

Personal details
- Born: 24 May 1948 (age 78) Santiago, Chile
- Party: Party for Democracy
- Spouse: Norma Acevedo
- Children: Two
- Parent(s): Ángel José Sartori Arellano; María Carolina Arellano Mardones
- Education: University of Chile (LL.B); York University (LL.M); Stanford University (M.D.)
- Occupation: Politician
- Profession: Lawyer; Political scientist

Jorge Sievert Heine Lorenzen (born 24 May 1948) is a Chilean politician who served as minister of State and as ambassador of Chile to China.

In 2012, he was a visiting professor of political science at the University of Konstanz in Germany. During the 2012–2013 academic year, he held the Pablo Neruda Chair in Latin American Studies at the Sorbonne in Paris. In 2013, he was appointed a Wilson Center Global Fellow at the Woodrow Wilson International Center for Scholars in Washington, D.C.

== Education ==
He attended the German School of Santiago before enrolling in the University of Chile, where he studied law and received his law degree in 1973.

He later studied political science at the University of York in England and at Stanford University in the United States, where he earned both a master's degree and a doctorate.

== Professional career ==
From 1980 to 1982, he was an associate researcher in the Latin American Program at the Woodrow Wilson International Center for Scholars in Washington, D.C.. He received postdoctoral fellowships from the John Simon Guggenheim Memorial Foundation and the Social Science Research Council. He was a visiting professor at St Antony's College, Oxford, where he taught a seminar on Caribbean politics. He also taught at the University of Puerto Rico and the Interamerican University of Puerto Rico, where he served as director of the Center for Caribbean and Latin American Research (CISCLA). He also served as an external examiner in the Department of Government at the University of the West Indies at Mona, Jamaica.

In 1989, he became deputy director of the Institute for European-Latin American Relations (IRELA) in Madrid, Spain, succeeding fellow Chilean Alberto van Klaveren. He served as president of the Caribbean Studies Association (CSA), the principal professional organization for Caribbean studies scholars, from 1990 to 1991, organizing the association's annual conference in Havana, Cuba. He also served as an official observer for the Organization of American States (OAS) during the 1990 elections in Haiti and chaired the jury for the Gordon Lewis Prize in Caribbean Studies in 1992.

From 1991 to 1993, he served as president of the Chilean Political Science Association, organizing its Second National Congress on Political Science in Iquique, devoted to the theme "State Reform". He has worked as a consultant for the United Nations, the foreign ministries of Canada and Trinidad and Tobago, the Ford Foundation, and Oxford Analytica. He was the founding president of the Stanford Club of Chile in 1993 and served as president of the United States Alumni Society (USAS) of Chile from 2000 to 2003.

In 2007, he was appointed professor of global governance at the Balsillie School of International Affairs at Wilfrid Laurier University and distinguished fellow at the Centre for International Governance Innovation (CIGI), both in Waterloo, Ontario.
