= José Guillermo Rodríguez =

Puerto Rican politician (born 1956)

José Guillermo Rodríguez Rodríguez

Mayor of Mayagüez, Puerto Rico
- Suspended
- In office January 11, 1993 – April 1, 2024
- Preceded by: Benjamín Cole
- Succeeded by: Jorge Ramos as Interim Mayor

Member of the Puerto Rico House of Representatives from the 18th District
- In office January 2, 1989 – January 2, 1993
- Preceded by: Esteban Rosado Báez
- Succeeded by: Tomás Bonilla Feliciano

Personal details
- Born: October 10, 1956 (age 70) Mayagüez, Puerto Rico
- Party: Popular Democratic Party (PPD)
- Spouse: Marisel Mora González
- Children: 2
- Education: Interamerican University of Puerto Rico - San Germán Campus (BA)
- Profession: Politician

José Guillermo Rodríguez Rodríguez is a Puerto Rican politician who served as the Mayor of the city of Mayagüez, Puerto Rico for 27 years until March 31, 2022 when he was suspended by the Special Independent Prosecutor Panel. He was born in Mayagüez on October 10, 1956. He is a member of the Popular Democratic Party of Puerto Rico.

Rodríguez suspension as mayor was effective April 1, 2022.

== Early years and education ==
The eldest of five siblings, Guillermo is the son of Guillermo Rodríguez and Natividad Rodríguez Estrada, the latter of whom died on 6 August 2020. He received his elementary school education in Escuela de Cruces and Escuela de Malezas, he received his intermediate school education from the Manuel A. Barreto Middle School and later graduated from Eugenio María de Hostos High School.

At sixteen years old he was elected Vice President of Popular Democratic Party Youth of Quebrada Grande, his Barrio. Afterwards he was the first elected president of the Popular Democratic Youth of the Mayagüez-Aguadilla district. On 1980, he graduated from Interamerican University of Puerto Rico, San German campus, with a Bachelor of Arts in Public Administration.

== Political career ==
Guillermo Rodríguez assumed office as Mayor of Mayagüez in 1993 and until 2022. He was re-elected in 2020 with 46% of the vote defeating Tania Lugo (PNP) with 39% of the vote.

He occupied diverse positions in the Municipal Government of Mayagüez: communal worker, assistant administrator of the Luis Muñoz Rivera Park, sub-director of civil defense, safety coordinator, assistant administrator for the Municipal Hospital and inspector of "Rentas Publicas".

In the House of Representatives of Puerto Rico, he worked as Assistant to the Youth Commission, and later as executive director of the Legislative office for Representative Hon. Esteban Rosado Báez. In the Popular Democratic primaries celebrated in 1988, he was elected to occupy the seat left by Rosado Báez in the House of Representatives.

In 1992 he ran for mayor of Mayagüez, winning by a vast majority, gaining 8,500 more votes than his own party. He swore as mayor on January 11, 1993. He worked on making sure the city was ready for the 2010 Central American and Caribbean Games, hosted by the city. On July 18, 2010, he spoke at the inauguration of the games where he stated "Puerto Rico no solo es el área metropolitana" (Puerto Rico is not only the metropolitan area).

He has been honored by many civic entities, among them, Distinguished Citizen by the Junior Chamber of Commerce in 1989; by the Centro Unido de Detallistas de Puerto Rico, in 1991; by the Chamber of Commerce of the West in 1990; by the Dominican-Puerto Rican Chamber of Commerce in 1993; and by the Comité Organizador de los Juegos Centroamericanos y del Caribe in 2010.

=== Criminal investigation ===
On April 2, 2025 former Mayor José Guillermo Rodríguez pleaded Guilty to Diverting Funds Meant for the Mayagüez Trauma Center. During today’s hearing at the Mayagüez Courthouse he also pleaded guilty to charges of dereliction of duty and embezzlement of public funds.

On March 23, 2021, seven individual were indicted and arrested on wire fraud charges in relation to a scheme to defraud the municipality of Mayagüez. Before these arrest the municipal government had created the Mayagüez Economic Development Inc. (MEDI). MEDI is a municipal corporation created to administer the assets of the municipality in order to increase revenue.

In total 58 properties that were passed to MEDI were later used as collateral for highly speculative investments. These investments may have provided the opportunity for the scheme to defraud the municipality. Among the properties on the list where places of historical importance including the Mayagüez City Hall, Teatro Yagüez, and Palacio de Recreación y Deportes. The San Antonio Hospital, the only pediatric hospital in the municipality, was also one of the properties.

At a press conference to address the controversy the mayor denied any involvement in illegal activities and pointed to other acts of corruption by authorities on the island.

On April 7, the day after the secretary of justice referred him, representative José "Quiquito" Meléndez Ortiz referred the mayor to the Special Independent Prosecutor Panel (PFEI, for its initials in Spanish) for these allegations. In September 2021 the Department of Justice recommended an investigation into the mayor's actions. In response Jose "Quiquito" Meléndez and another representative called for the suspension of the mayor's salary. The mayor designated an interim mayor on April 22 after calls grew for an investigation into his administration. In July 2021 the mayor's house and offices were searched by the FBI. In March 2022 the prosecutor panel suspended him as mayor. In June he was charged with mismanagement of public funds and subsequently arrested and released after posting bail.

== Personal life ==
In December 1988, he married Marisel Mora González with whom he has two children: Francisco José and Guillermo Antonio Rodríguez Mora.

He is a practicing Roman Catholic.

== See also ==
- Mayagüez, Puerto Rico
- Politics of Puerto Rico

House of Representatives of Puerto Rico
Preceded by Esteban Rosado Báez	Member of the Puerto Rico House of Representatives from the 18th District; 1988-1992	Succeeded by Tomás Bonilla Feliciano
Political offices
Preceded by Bejamín Cole	Mayor of Mayagüez, Puerto Rico; 1993–	Succeeded by Incumbent
