= List of mayors of Mayagüez, Puerto Rico =

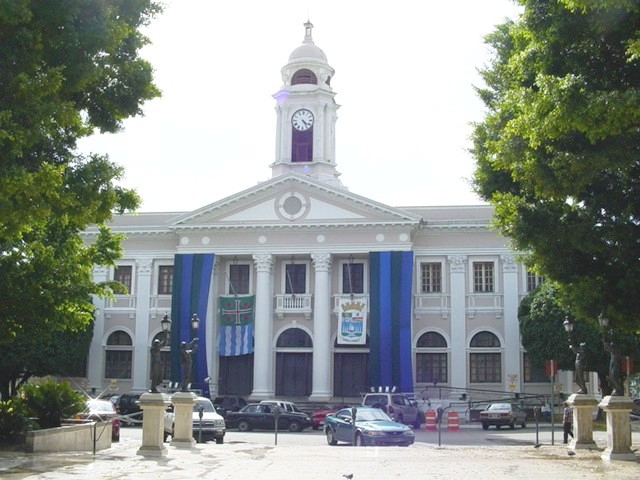
Mayaguez City Hall, 2005

This is a list of mayors of Mayagüez, located on the west coast of Puerto Rico.

== 19th century ==
#	Name	Office	Political Party
1	José Ma. Ramirez de Arellano	1823	
2	Felix Monteagudo (Int.)	1828	
3	José Ramón Pagán (Int.)	1833	
4	Rafael Mangual	1836	
5	José Ant. de Cucullu	1837	Conservative
6	Fernando Lloreda (Int.)	1838	
7	Simón María Orama (Int.)	1838	
8	Esteban Nadal (Int.)	1839	
9	Agustin Feliú	1841	
10	Juan José de Cartagena	1842	Conservative
11	Esteban Nadal	1843	
12	Gerónimo Patxot (Int.)	1845	
13	José Basora (Int.)	1846	
14	Juan José de Cartagena	1847	Conservative
15	Pablo Moreu (Int.)	1847	
16	José Antonio Ruiz (Int.)	1848	
17	Cristóbal Blanch	1848	
18	José Ant. de Cucullu	1848	Conservative
19	Isodoro Aviño (Int.)	1849	
20	Juan Davis (Int.)	1850	
21	Luis Torrellas (Int.)	1851	
22	Manuel Cedeño (Int.)	1851	Liberal
23	Leonardo de Campos	1852	Liberal
24	Lorenzo Sojo (Int.)	1852	
25	Buenaventura Plaja (Int.)	1855	
26	Antonio Caparrós	1855	
27	Hilarión Pérez Guerra	1856	
28	Magin Vidal (Int.)	1856	
29	José Ant. de Cucullu	1857	Conservative
30	Sebastián Pratts (Int.)	1857	
31	Antonio Annoni (Int.)	1857	
32	Salvador Badrena (Int.)	1859	
33	Antonio Blanes (Int.)	1860	
34	Bernardo Lloreda	1861	
35	Magin Raldiris (Int.)	1862	
36	Policarpo Alvarez	1862	
37	Pedro José de Olaguibel	1862	
38	Francisco Carbó	1863	
39	José Chavarri (Int.)	1863	
40	Rafael Blanes (Int.)	1864	
41	Francisco Carreras (Int.)	1865	
42	Cagetano Roger (Int.)	1866	Conservative
43	Bruno Ruiz de Porras (Int.)	1866	Conservative
44	Antonio de Balboa Blanes	1866	Conservative
45	Cayetano Roger (Accidental)	1870	Conservative
46	Eduardo Quesada (Acci.)	1870	
47	Col. Enrique Sánchez (Acci.)	1870	
48	Esteban Nadal	1870	Conservative
49	José Antonio Annoni	1872	
50	Felipe Goyco Quiñones	1874	
51	Manuel Pratts	1875	Liberal
52	Pedro de Nieva (Int.)	1875	Liberal
53	Buenaventura Plaja (Int.)	1876	Liberal
54	José F. Gonze	1878	
55	Juan J. Mangual (Int.)	1878	
56	Pedro José de Olaguibel	1879	Conservative
57	Juan Mercader (Int.)	1879	
58	Antonio Frau (Int.)	1880	
59	Guillermo Frontera	1883	Conservative
60	Pedro José Olaquibel	1887	Conservative
61	José de Jesús Domínguez	1890	
62	Carlos J. Monagas (Int.)	1890	
63	Salvador Suau y Mulet	1891	Conservative
64	Francisco Blanes	1892	Liberal
65	Miguel Pons	1894	
66	Salvador Suau y Mulet	1895	Conservative
67	Santiago Sáenz (Int.)	1895	
68	Eliseo Font y Guillot	1898	
69	Diego García St. Laurent	1899	
70	Charles L. Cooper (Acc.)	1899	

== 20th century ==
#	Name	Office	Political Party
71	Blas Nadal	1900	Incorporated Republican Party
72	Lorenzo Matínez (Int.)	1901	Incorporated Republican Party
73	Mateo Fajardo Cardona	1902	Incorporated Republican Party
74	Leopoldo Cabassa (Int.)	1903	Incorporated Republican Party
75	José A. Menéndez	1906	Pure Republican Party
76	Alberto Bravo (Int.)	1907	Incorporated Republican Party
77	Mariano Riera Palmer	1908	Union of Puerto Rico
78	Dr. Pedro Perea	1911	Incorporated Republican Party
79	Carlos Sabater (Int.)	1913	Incorporated Republican Party
80	Juan Rivera Vélez (Int.)	1914	
81	Jaime Picó Fernández(Int.)	1918	Incorporated Republican Party
82	Juan Cancio Ortiz (Int.)	1918	Incorporated Republican Party
83	Alejandro Galanes (Int.)	1918	Incorporated Republican Party
84	Juan Rullán Rivera	1921–1932	Union of Puerto Rico
85	Alfonso González Martínes	1933–1937	Alianza Puertorriqueña
86	Dr. Frank Olán Rivera (Int.)	1936	
87	Manuel Marín Gaudier	1937–1941	Alianza Puertorriqueña
88	Julio N. Matos	1941	Popular Democratic
89	Manuel A. Barreto	1941–1947	Popular Democratic
91	Baudilio Vega Berríos	1947–1952	Popular Democratic
92	Augusto Valentín Vizcarrondo	1953–1956	Popular Democratic
93	Baudilio Vega Berríos	1957–1968	Popular Democratic
94	Benjamín Cole	1969–1992	Popular Democratic
95	José Guillermo Rodríguez	1993 – 2024	Popular Democratic
96	Jorge Luis Ramos Ruiz	2025-incumbent	Popular Democratic

== See also ==
- Mayoralty in Puerto Rico
- Timeline of Mayagüez, Puerto Rico
- Mayagüez, Puerto Rico
- Puerto Rico

== Bibliography ==
- Mayaguez: Notas para su Historia; Silvia Aguilo Ramos, 1984, San Juan, Model Offset Printing
- Genealogia Biografias e Historias de Mayagüez de Ayer y Hoy y Antologia Puerto Rico; Martin Gaudier, 1959, San German, Imprenta "El Aguila"
- Jorge Heine (1993). The Last Cacique: Leadership and Politics in a Puerto Rican City. University of Pittsburgh Press. ISBN 978-0-8229-7691-2. (About Bejamín Cole era)
