= Teatro Yagüez =

Historic building in Mayagüez, Puerto Rico

- U.S. National Register of Historic Places
- Puerto Rico Historic Sites and Zones
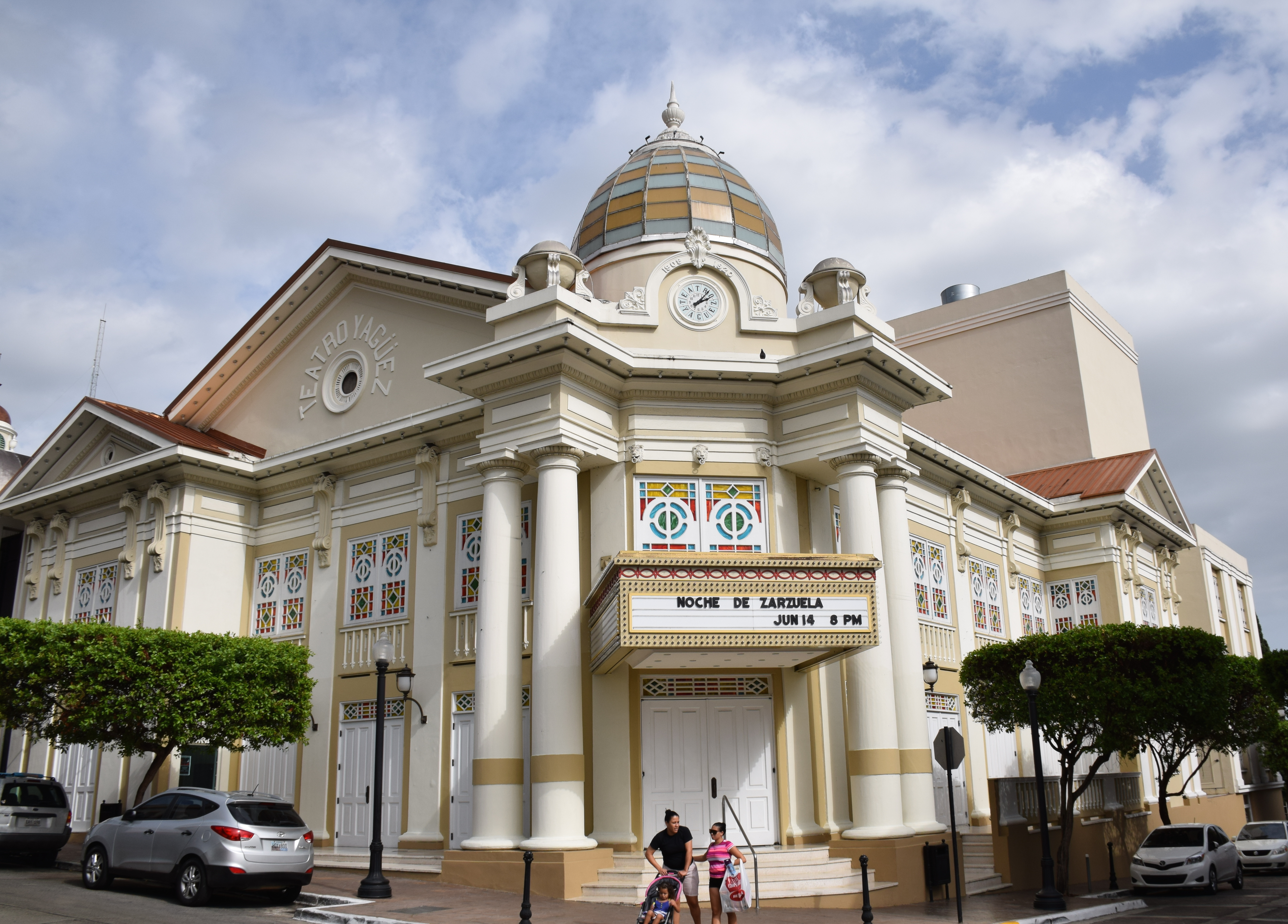
- Teatro Yagüez in 2014

- Location within Puerto Rico
- Location: Calle Candelaria y Calle Dr. Basora; Mayagüez, Puerto Rico
- Coordinates: 18°12′4.39″N 67°8′24.75″W
- Area: 0.2 acres (0.081 ha)
- Built: 1909
- Architect: Sabas Honore et al.
- NRHP reference No.: 85003086
- RNSZH No.: 2003-25-(1-9) JP-SH

Significant dates
- Added to NRHP: December 2, 1985
- Designated RNSZH: January 24, 2003

The Teatro Yagüez (Yagüez Theater) in Puerto Rico is a historic building currently operating as a performing arts theater. It is located at Candelaria Street, (formerly Calle McKinley) and Dr. Basora Streets, in the municipality of Mayagüez. The theater building consists of the Lucy Boscana Hall and the Roberto Cole Cafe Theater.

== History ==
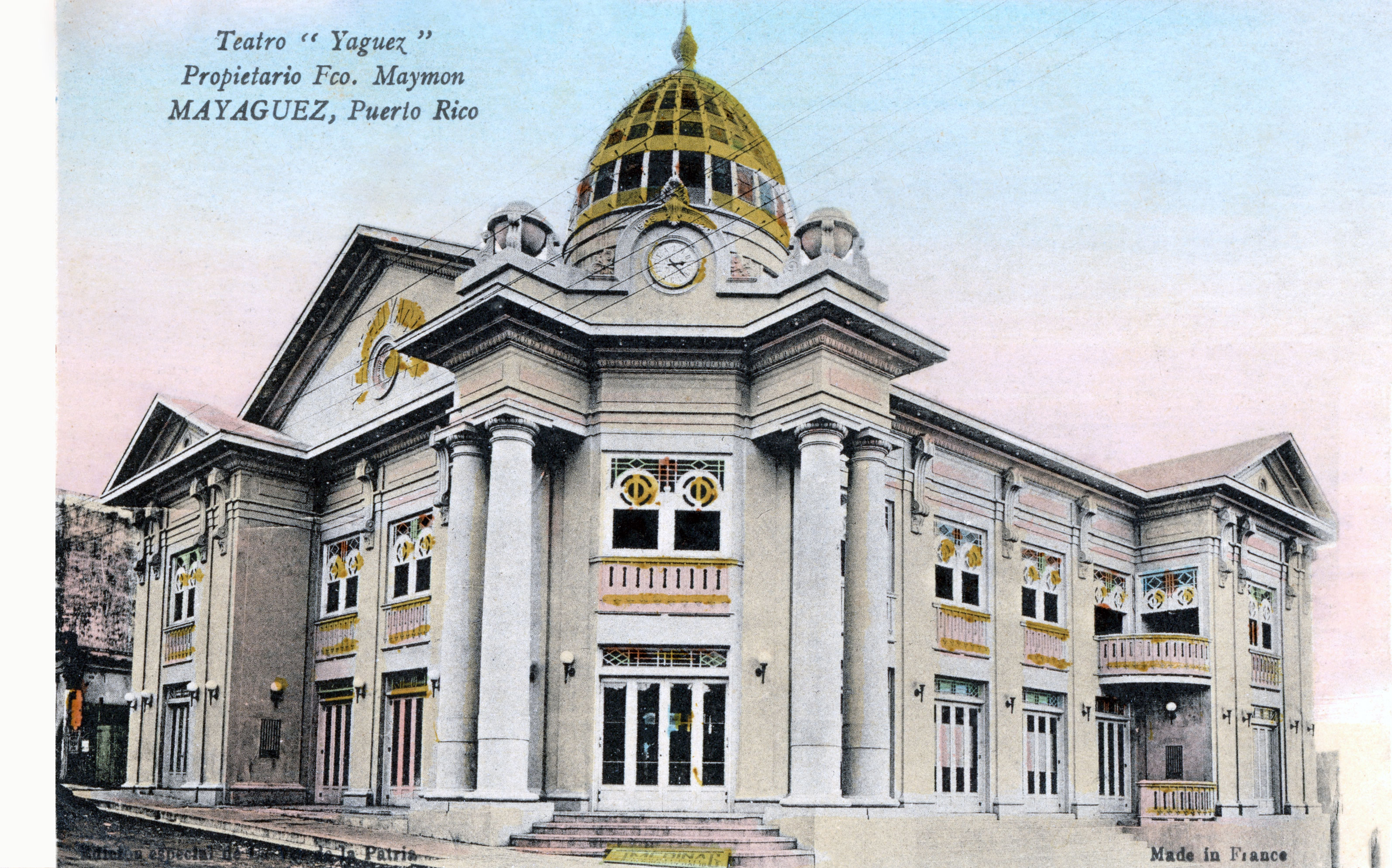
Teatro Yagüez, c. 1922

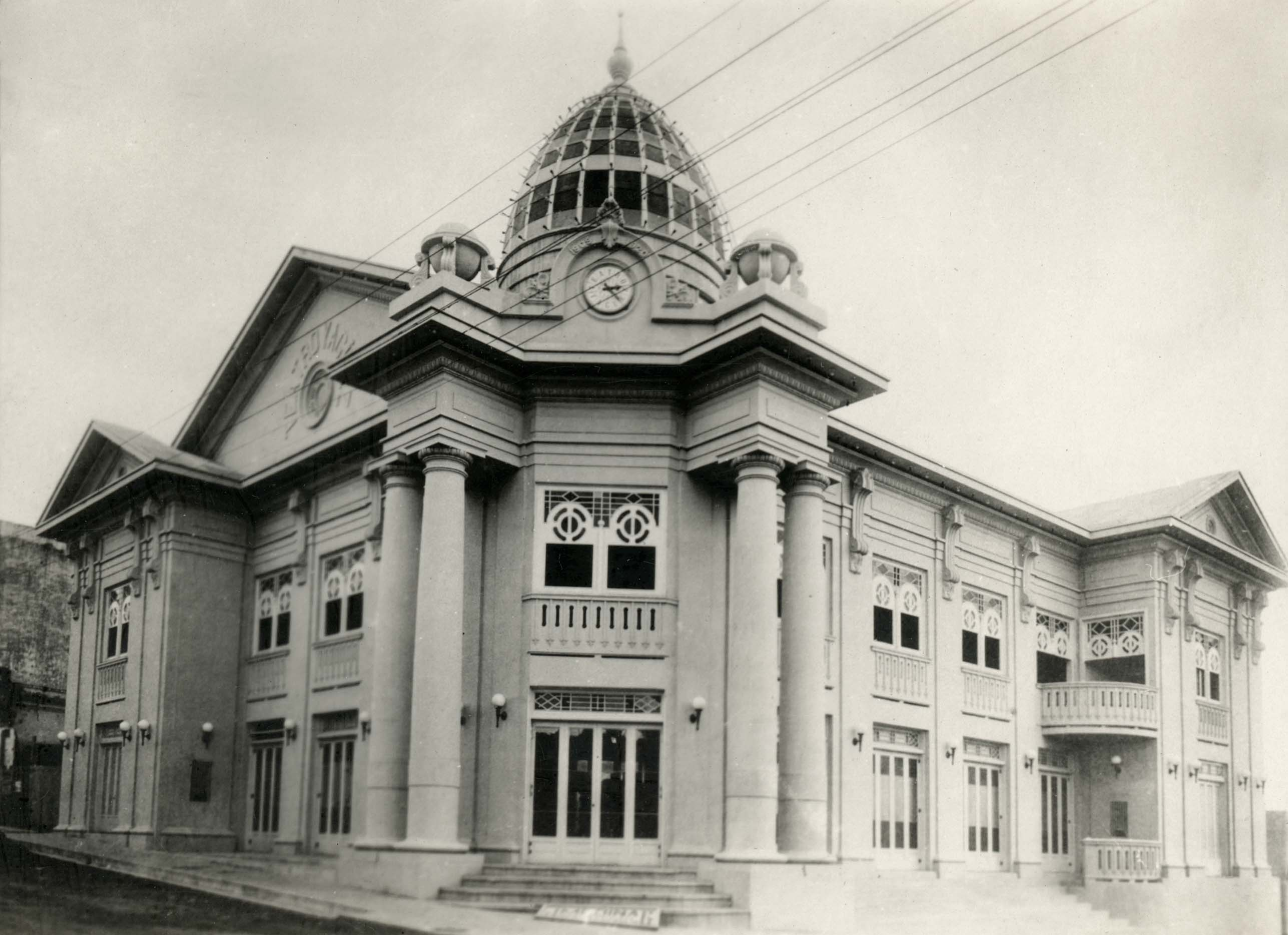
Teatro Yagüez, c. 1930

It was originally erected by Francisco Maymón Palmer in 1909. Maymón's parents emigrated to Puerto Rico from Italy in the 19th century. They settled in the town of San German. Early in the 20th century Francisco tried to build a theatre in the town of San German but was unable due to the existing religious culture then, which considered a theatre as a "bad influence' on the local population. Maymón was an entrepreneur by vocation, having travelled to Europe and the United States in his 20s, and he would not be stopped. He moved to the nearby city of Mayaguez where he established himself as one of the pioneers of the industry of cinematography in the island of Puerto Rico, introducing this new form of Visual Art early in the beginning of the 20th century by showing silent films throughout the nearby towns and becoming the exclusive distributor for 'Nicholas Power Co.' movie projectors throughout the Caribbean islands. The 'Nicholas Power Company' was located in New York. With the help of his business partners Mr. Jose Rahola and Mr. Fundador Vargas, he imported movies from the Pathé Company in Europe, showing them in town centers (plazas) under the stars and at the old Mayaguez Municipal Theater ('Teatro Municipal'). The latter no longer exists, as it was destroyed in the 1918 earthquake that hit the city and was never rebuilt, hence the Teatro Yagüez became the city's preferred gathering place for opera, plays, concerts, and silent movies.

Francisco purchased the land where the Yaguez sits today around 1905. The construction of the first Teatro Yagüez building began around 1907; The formal inauguration was in 1909. Materials such as the cement was imported from Germany, interior ceilings from Italy, tiles and carpets from Spain. An architectural jewel, the Teatro Yagüez began as a neo-baroque style Opera House, years later turning into a silent movie theater. Incorrectly described as art deco style, however, the art deco movement developed years after the theater's first construction and later reconstruction.

Maymón suffered a great loss, when on June 19, 1919, a fire destroyed his beloved Teatro Yagüez. The World Almanac and Book of Facts states that 150 people died in the fire, although the records are vague and mostly sensationalist. According to the evidence, investigations after the fire exonerated him of all culpability, and indeed pointed the finger at local entities (namely the Municipal government body at the time), who had an interest in the location (the land) where the Teatro Yagüez stood, and who indeed, tried to purchase the land after the fire, and being unable to purchase it, attempted to expropriate it but without any success. However, there was never any evidence, only accusations and theories never proven. 100 years later, a new theory came forth, the most likely suspect of that fire was the nitrate films stored in a closet inside the theatre. The Teatro Yagüez was finally rebuilt and re-inaugurated on March 21, 1921 after a lawsuit between Francisco Maymón and the Municipal Council of the city, in which Francisco Maymón prevailed.

"The current building was the product of one of the most brilliant architects of the era, [José Sabàs Honoré], who designed the new theater after the June 1919 fire."

Francisco Maymon's son and daughter, Miguel A. Maymón Camuñas, and Petra Maymón Cernuda inherited the Teatro Yagüez in 1954 after Francisco's passing. In 1959, Miguel purchased his sister's share in the Yagüez, becoming sole proprietor of the Teatro Yagüez.

In 1976, the U.S. government sent a Bicentennial Commission to Puerto Rico, who declared the Teatro Yagüez a landmark. Under the administration of Benjamin Cole, the municipality of Mayagüez purchased the Yagüez in 1980 and restored it to its original magnificence in 1984. It was listed on the U.S. National Register of Historic Places in 1985 and on the Puerto Rico Register of Historic Sites and Zones in 2003.

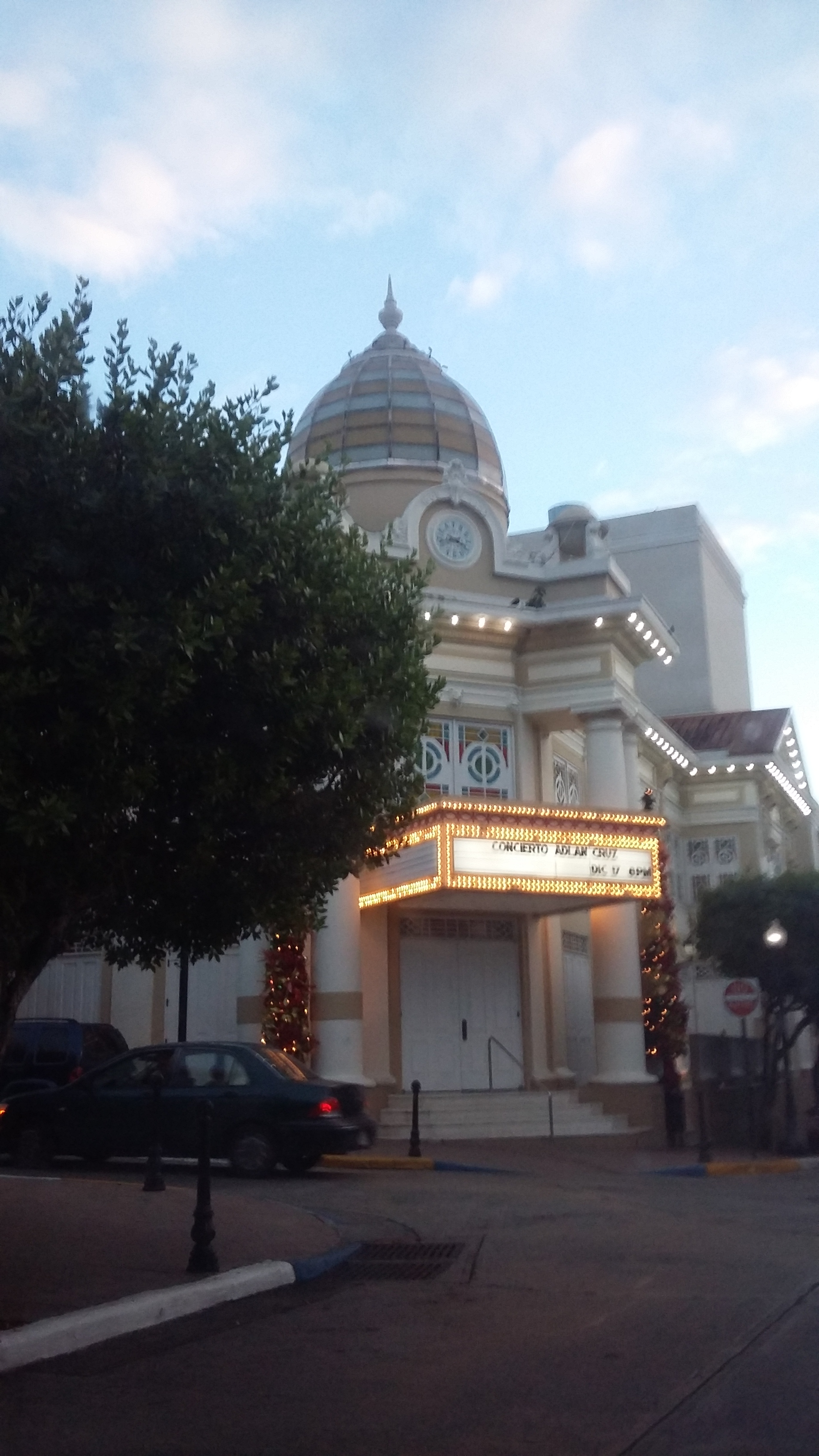
Teatro Yagüez in 2016

The Teatro Yaguez has been fully restored and is in use today. It remains as a beautiful reminder of the history of theater and arts of the early 20th century in Puerto Rico. Its stage and auditorium were renamed as Lucy Boscana Hall in December 2008, in tribute to the Mayagüez-born actress and teacher.

Maymón named the Teatro Yagüez: La Catedral Del Arte Sonoro. (The Cathedral of Sonorous Art), a nickname that has prevailed to this day as the Yaguez is visually and architecturally, a Cathedral.
