= Mayagüez City Hall =

Historic building in Mayagüez, Puerto Rico

- Casa Consistorial De Mayaguez
- U.S. National Register of Historic Places
- Puerto Rico Historic Sites and Zones
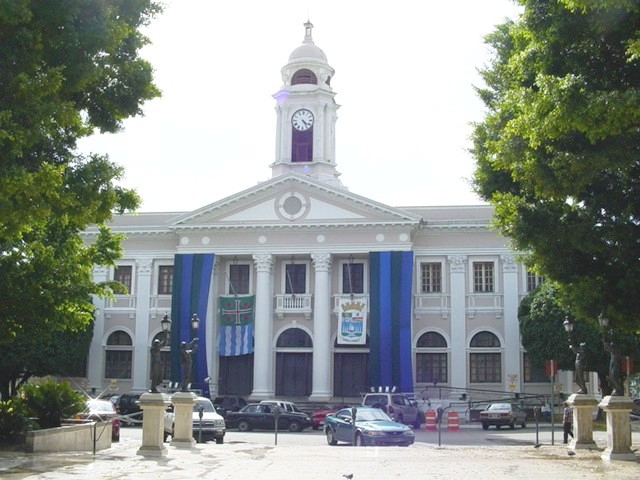

- Location within Puerto Rico
- Location: Calle Candelaria, Plaza Colón, Mayaguez, Puerto Rico
- Coordinates: 18°12′04.00″N 67°08′23.00″W
- Built: 1926
- Architect: Arq. Carmoega and Ing M. Font Giménez
- Architectural style: Classical Revival and Neoclasical
- NRHP reference No.: 85003046
- RNSZH No.: 2003-25-(1-9) JP-SH

Significant dates
- Added to NRHP: December 2, 1977
- Designated RNSZH: January 24, 2003

The Mayagüez Municipal Assembly Hall (Spanish: Casa Consistorial de Mayagüez), more commonly known as the Mayagüez City Hall (Casa Alcaldia de Mayagüez), is the city hall and the headquarters of the executive branch of the Municipality of Mayagüez, in Puerto Rico. It is located in front of the Colón Main Town Square facing the Nuestra Señora de la Candelaria Cathedral.

== History ==
The first building was built in 1845 but was destroyed by the earthquake of 1918. The original building housed the municipal offices, a jail, a telegraph station and the guard corps.

The current city hall was built in 1926. Its main entrance consists of a portico and a tower with a clock. Its façade was built in the Neoclassical style, classified as such because of its Corinthian capitals and its Greco-Roman columns. The architects were Rafael Carmoega and engineer Font Jiménez, it was built by Ignacio Flores Lorenzo, and Adriano González was the contractor of the work. The mayor who officially requested and authorized construction of the new city hall was Juan Rullán Rivera. Numerous reception halls, workrooms, government offices and other public services are also situated in the building.

== Gallery ==
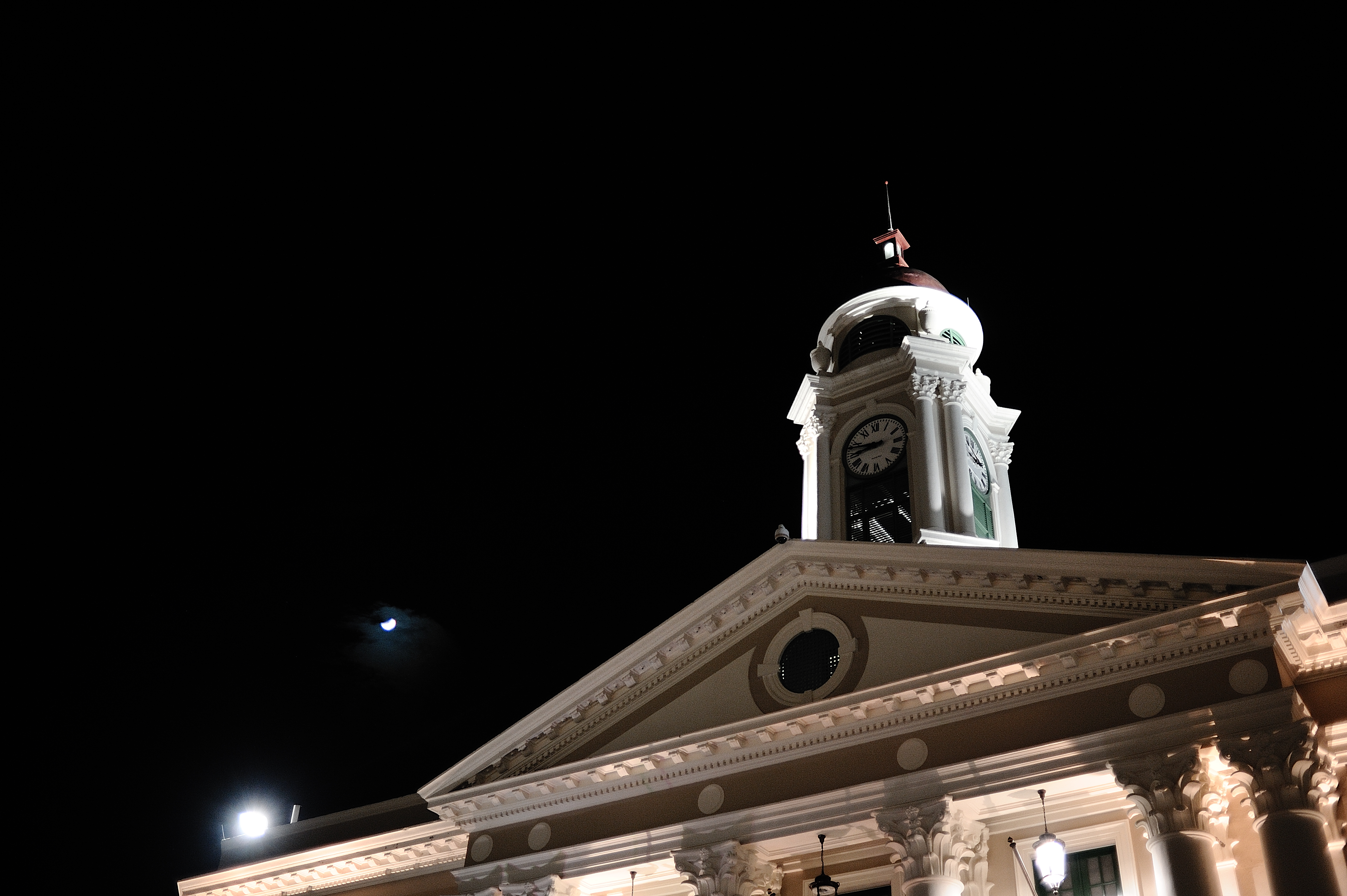
Top portion of portico, the tower and clock at night
