= 2012 United States gubernatorial elections =

- November 6, 2012; June 5 (Wisconsin recall)

14 governorships 12 states; 2 territories (Note: Including a recall election in Wisconsin)
| | Majority party | Minority party |
|---|---|---|
| Party | Republican | Democratic |
| Seats before | 29 | 20 |
| Seats after | 30 | 19 |
| Seat change | ▲1 | ▼1 |
| Popular vote | 8,305,687 | 7,992,567 |
| Percentage | 49.7% | 47.9% |
| Seats up | 4 | 8 |
| Seats won | 5 | 7 |
- Map of the results Democratic hold Republican gain Republican hold Popular Democratic gain Nonpartisan politician No election

United States gubernatorial elections were held in 12 states (including a recall election in Wisconsin on June 5) and two territories. Of the eight Democratic and four Republican seats contested, only that of North Carolina changed party hands, giving the Republicans a net gain of one governorship. These elections (except for Wisconsin) coincided with the presidential election on November 6, 2012. As of 2024, this marked the last time in which a Democrat won the governorship in Missouri, and the last time in which a Republican won the governorship in North Carolina.

== Election predictions ==
| State | Incumbent | Last race | Cook Nov 1, 2012 | IE Nov 2, 2012 | Sabato Nov 5, 2012 | RCP Nov 5, 2012 | Result |
|---|---|---|---|---|---|---|---|
| Delaware | Jack Markell | 67.5% D | Solid D | Solid D | Safe D | Safe D | Markell; 69.3% D |
| Indiana | Mitch Daniels (term-limited) | 57.8% R | Likely R | Likely R | Likely R | Likely R | Pence; 49.5% R |
| Missouri | Jay Nixon | 58.4% D | Lean D | Likely D | Likely D | Lean D | Nixon; 54.8% D |
| Montana | Brian Schweitzer (term-limited) | 65.5% D | Tossup | Tossup | Lean R (flip) | Tossup | Bullock; 48.9% D |
| New Hampshire | John Lynch (retired) | 52.6% D | Tossup | Tossup | Lean D | Lean D | Hassan; 54.6% D |
| North Carolina | Bev Perdue (retired) | 50.3% D | Lean R (flip) | Likely R (flip) | Likely R (flip) | Likely R (flip) | McCrory; 54.6% R (flip) |
| North Dakota | Jack Dalrymple | 74.4% R | Solid R | Solid R | Safe R | Safe R | Dalrymple; 63.1% R |
| Utah | Gary Herbert | 64.1% R | Solid R | Solid R | Safe R | Safe R | Herbert; 68.4% R |
| Vermont | Peter Shumlin | 49.4% D | Solid D | Solid D | Safe D | Safe D | Shumlin; 57.8% D |
| Washington | Christine Gregoire (retired) | 53.2% D | Tossup | Tilt D | Lean D | Tossup | Inslee; 51.5% D |
| West Virginia | Earl Ray Tomblin | 49.6% D | Lean D | Lean D | Lean D | Likely D | Tomblin; 50.5% D |

== Race summary ==
=== States ===
| State | Incumbent | Party | First elected | Result | Candidates |
|---|---|---|---|---|---|
| Delaware | Jack Markell | Democratic | 2008 | Incumbent re-elected. | ▌ ✓ Jack Markell (Democratic) 69.3%; ▌Jeff Cragg (Republican) 28.6%; ▌Mark Perri (Green) 1.2% |
| Indiana | Mitch Daniels | Republican | 2004 | Incumbent term-limited. New governor elected. Republican hold. | ▌ ✓ Mike Pence (Republican) 49.5%; ▌John R. Gregg (Democratic) 46.6%; ▌Rupert Boneham (Libertarian) 4.0% |
| Missouri | Jay Nixon | Democratic | 2008 | Incumbent re-elected. | ▌ ✓ Jay Nixon (Democratic) 54.8%; ▌Dave Spence (Republican) 42.5%; ▌Jim Higgins (Libertarian) 2.7% |
| Montana | Brian Schweitzer | Democratic | 2004 | Incumbent term-limited. New governor elected. Democratic hold. | ▌ ✓ Steve Bullock (Democratic) 48.9%; ▌Rick Hill (Republican) 47.3%; ▌Ron Vandevender (Libertarian) 3.8% |
| New Hampshire | John Lynch | Democratic | 2004 | Incumbent retired. New governor elected. Democratic hold. | ▌ ✓ Maggie Hassan (Democratic) 54.6%; ▌Ovide Lamontagne (Republican) 42.5%; ▌John J. Babiarz (Libertarian) 2.8% |
| North Carolina | Bev Perdue | Democratic | 2008 | Incumbent retired. New governor elected. Republican gain. | ▌ ✓ Pat McCrory (Republican) 54.6%; ▌Walter Dalton (Democratic) 43.2%; ▌Barbara Howe (Libertarian) 2.1% |
| North Dakota | Jack Dalrymple | Republican | 2010 (Note: Dalrymple took office after his predecessor (John Hoeven) resigned.) | Incumbent elected to a full term. | ▌ ✓ Jack Dalrymple (Republican) 63.1%; ▌Ryan Taylor (Democratic–NPL) 34.3%; ▌Paul Sorum (Independent) 1.7% |
| Utah | Gary Herbert | Republican | 2009 (Note: Herbert took office after his predecessor (Jon Huntsman Jr.) resigned. He was subsequently elected in the 2010 Utah gubernatorial special election.) | Incumbent re-elected. | ▌ ✓ Gary Herbert (Republican) 68.4%; ▌Peter Cooke (Democratic) 27.6%; ▌Ken Larsen (Libertarian) 2.3%; ▌Kirk Pearson (Constitution) 1.8% |
| Vermont | Peter Shumlin | Democratic | 2010 | Incumbent re-elected. | ▌ ✓ Peter Shumlin (Democratic) 57.8%; ▌Randy Brock (Republican) 37.6%; ▌Emily Peyton (Independent) 2.0%; ▌Cris Ericson (Marijuana) 1.9% |
| Washington | Christine Gregoire | Democratic | 2004 | Incumbent retired. New governor elected. Democratic hold. | ▌ ✓ Jay Inslee (Democratic) 51.5%; ▌Rob McKenna (Republican) 48.5% |
| West Virginia | Earl Ray Tomblin | Democratic | 2010 (Note: Tomblin took office after his predecessor (Joe Manchin) resigned. He was subsequently elected in the 2011 West Virginia gubernatorial special election.) | Incumbent re-elected. | ▌ ✓ Earl Ray Tomblin (Democratic) 50.5%; ▌Bill Maloney (Republican) 45.7%; ▌Jesse Johnson (Mountain) 2.5%; ▌David Moran (Libertarian) 1.3% |
| Wisconsin (recall) | Scott Walker | Republican | 2010 | Incumbent re-elected. | ▌ ✓ Scott Walker (Republican) 53.1%; ▌Tom Barrett (Democratic) 46.3% |

=== Territories ===
| Territory | Incumbent | Party | First elected | Result | Candidates |
|---|---|---|---|---|---|
| American Samoa | Togiola Tulafono | Democratic | 2003 (Note: Tulafono took office after his predecessor (Tauese Pita Fiti Sunia) died. He was subsequently elected in the 2004 American Samoa gubernatorial election.) | Incumbent retired. New governor elected. Independent gain. | ▌ ✓ Lolo Matalasi Moliga (Independent) 52.9%; ▌Faoa Aitofele Sunia (Democratic) 47.1% |
| Puerto Rico | Luis Fortuño | New Progressive | 2008 | Incumbent lost re-election. New member elected. Popular Democratic gain. | ▌ ✓ Alejandro García Padilla (PPD) 47.7%; ▌Luis Fortuño (PNP) 47.1%; ▌Juan Dalmau Ramírez (PIP) 2.5%; ▌Rafael Bernabe (PPT) 1.0% |

== Closest races ==
States where the margin of victory was under 1%:

1. Puerto Rico, 0.60%

States where the margin of victory was under 5%:

1. Montana, 1.56%
2. Indiana, 2.93%
3. Washington, 3.08%
4. West Virginia, 4.84%

States where the margin of victory was under 10%:

1. American Samoa, 5.88%
2. Wisconsin, 6.80%

Red denotes states won by Republicans. Blue denotes states won by Democrats. Grey denotes states won by Independents.

== Delaware ==
2012 Delaware gubernatorial election
- November 6, 2012
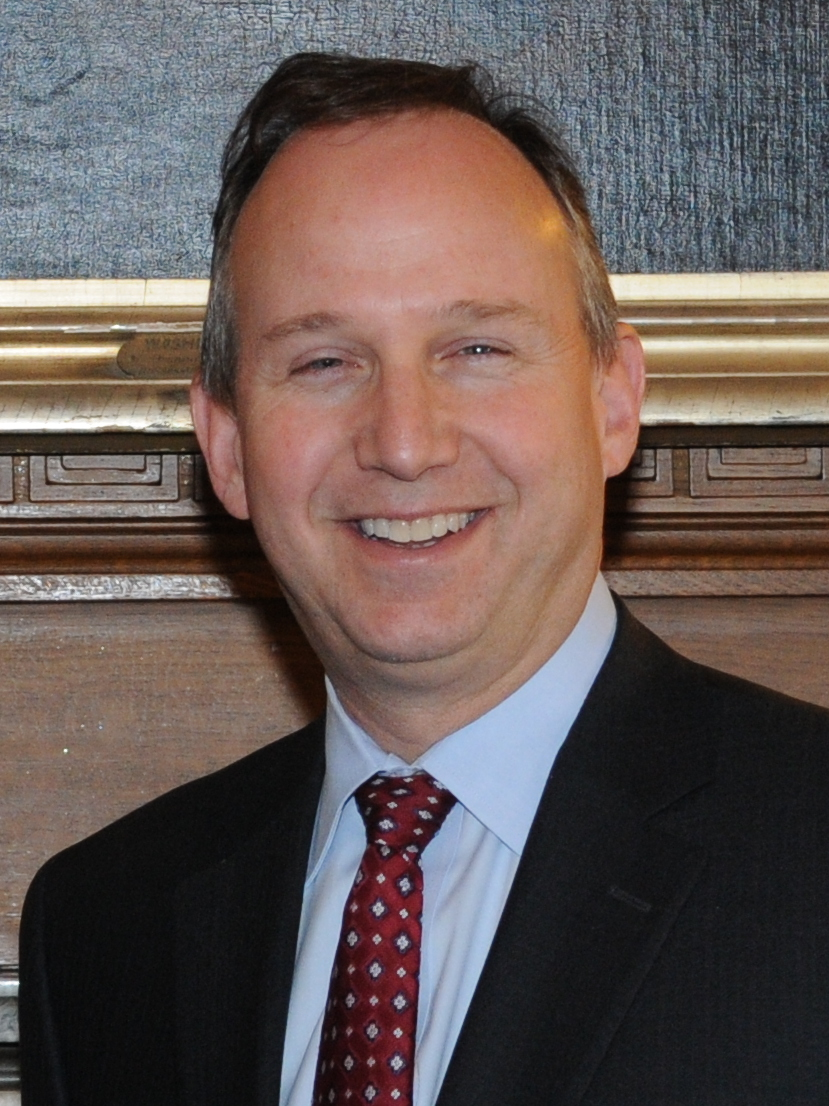

| Nominee | Jack Markell | Jeff Cragg |
| Party | Democratic | Republican |
| Popular vote | 275,993 | 113,793 |
| Percentage | 69.3% | 28.6% |
- County results
Governor before election
Jack Markell
Democratic
Elected Governor
Jack Markell
Democratic

Governor Jack Markell successfully ran for re-election. His Republican challenger was Jeff Cragg.

Delaware gubernatorial election, 2012
| Party | Candidate | Votes | % |
|---|---|---|---|
| Democratic | Jack Markell (incumbent) | 275,993 | 69.34 |
| Republican | Jeff Cragg | 113,793 | 28.59 |
| Green | Mark Perri | 4,575 | 1.15 |
| Libertarian | Jesse McVay | 3,668 | 0.92 |
| Total votes | | 398,029 | 100.00 |
| Democratic hold | | | |

== Indiana ==
2012 Indiana gubernatorial election
- November 6, 2012
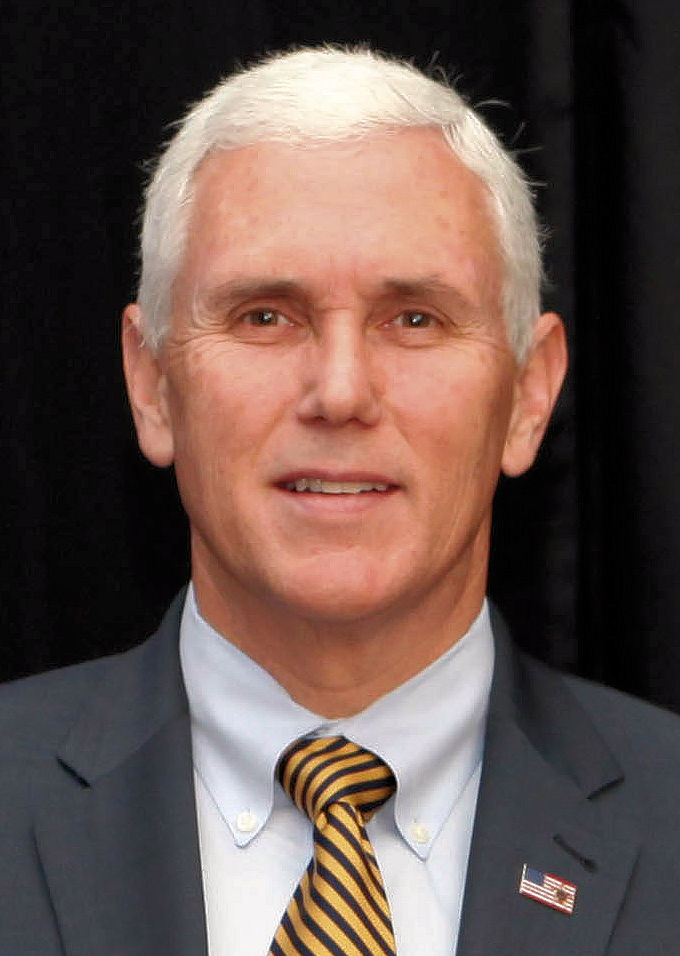

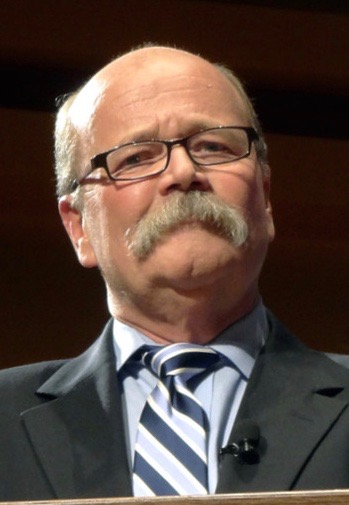
| Nominee | Mike Pence | John R. Gregg |
| Party | Republican | Democratic |
| Running mate | Sue Ellspermann | Vi Simpson |
| Popular vote | 1,275,424 | 1,200,016 |
| Percentage | 49.5% | 46.6% |
- County results
Governor before election
Mitch Daniels
Republican
Elected Governor
Mike Pence
Republican

Governor Mitch Daniels was term-limited in 2012.

Mike Pence, a six-term Republican in the U.S. House of Representatives, announced his candidacy for his party's nomination. Pence, whose announcement was anticipated by his resignation of a leading position in the GOP caucus in the House, was regarded as the favorite for election. Indianapolis businessman and former Hamilton County Councilman Jim Wallace had announced his candidacy for the Republican nomination prior to Pence's entrance but failed to collect enough signatures to become an official candidate by the deadline in February 2012.

Former state House Speaker John R. Gregg was unopposed for the Democratic Party's nomination.

Former Survivor contestant and founder of the Rupert's Kids charity Rupert Boneham ran as the Libertarian Party candidate.

Pence narrowly defeated Gregg with 49.9% of the vote to Gregg's 46.56%. Boneham received 3.95% of the vote.

Indiana gubernatorial election, 2012
| Party | Candidate | Votes | % |
|---|---|---|---|
| Republican | Mike Pence | 1,275,424 | 49.49 |
| Democratic | John R. Gregg | 1,200,016 | 46.56 |
| Libertarian | Rupert Boneham | 101,868 | 3.95 |
| Write-in | Donnie Harold Harris | 21 | 0.00 |
| Total votes | | 2,577,329 | 100.00 |
| Republican hold | | | |

== Missouri ==
2012 Missouri gubernatorial election
- November 6, 2012
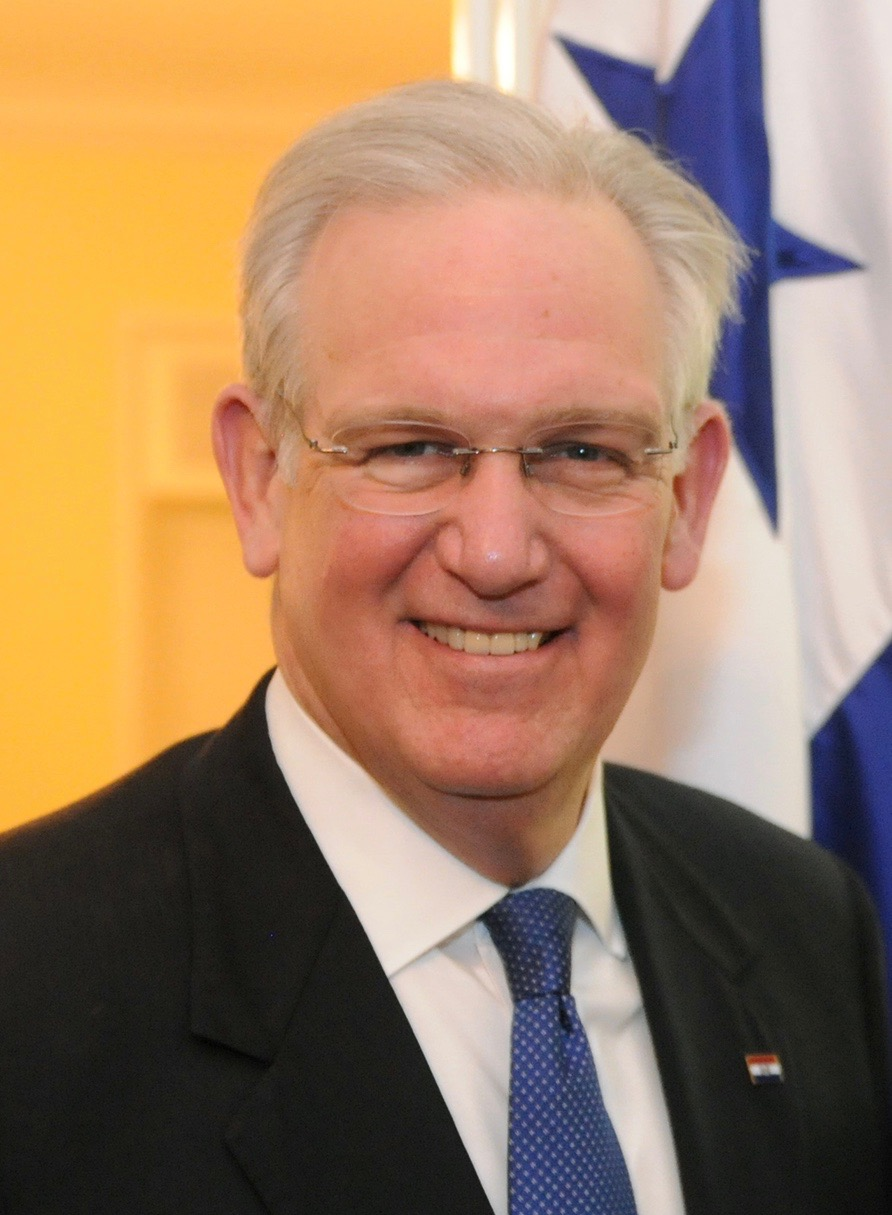

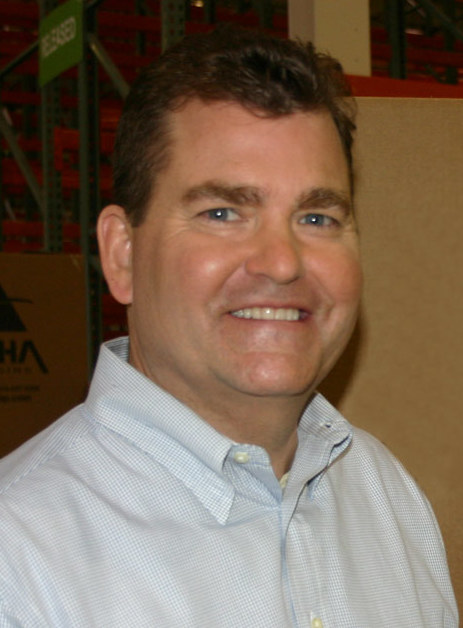
| Nominee | Jay Nixon | Dave Spence |
| Party | Democratic | Republican |
| Popular vote | 1,494,056 | 1,160,265 |
| Percentage | 54.8% | 42.5% |
- County results
Governor before election
Jay Nixon
Democratic
Elected Governor
Jay Nixon
Democratic

Governor Jay Nixon sought re-election.

Dave Spence, a businessman from St. Louis, won the Republican nomination over attorney Bill Randles in the August 7, 2012 primary.

Jim Higgins was the Libertarian candidate.

Nixon won the general election over Spence and Higgins.

The lieutenant governor is elected separately.

As of 2024, this is the last time a Democrat won the governorship of Missouri. This is also the last time that a gubernatorial nominee and a lieutenant gubernatorial nominee of different opposite political parties were elected governor and lieutenant governor in Missouri, to date.

Missouri gubernatorial election, 2012
| Party | Candidate | Votes | % |
|---|---|---|---|
| Democratic | Jay Nixon (incumbent) | 1,494,056 | 54.77 |
| Republican | Dave Spence | 1,160,265 | 42.53 |
| Libertarian | Jim Higgins | 73,509 | 2.70 |
| Write-in | | 53 | 0.00 |
| Total votes | | 2,727,883 | 100.00 |
| Democratic hold | | | |

== Montana ==
2012 Montana gubernatorial election
- November 6, 2012
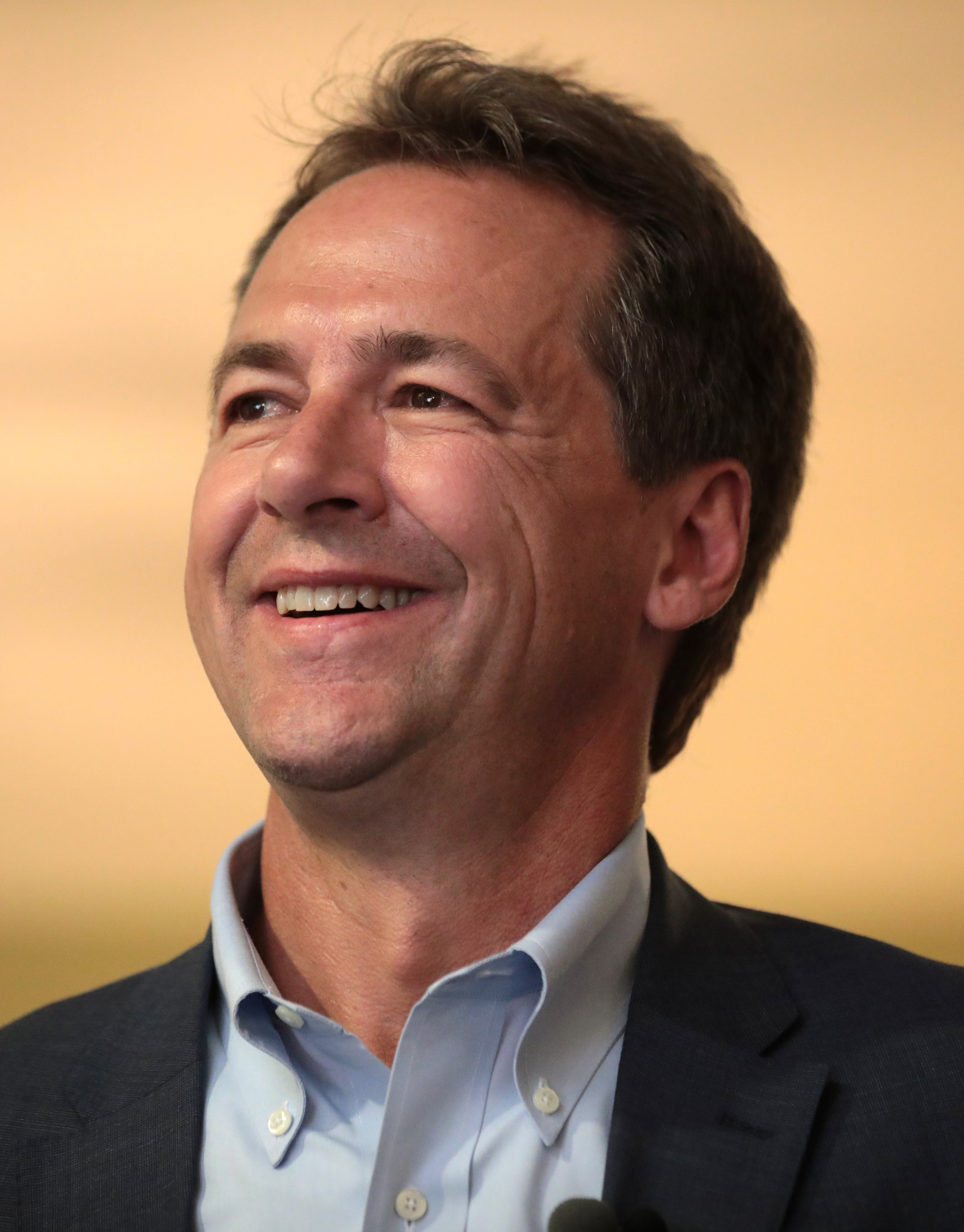

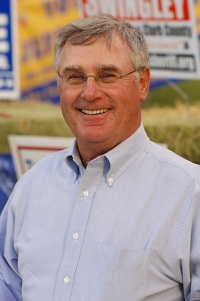
| Nominee | Steve Bullock | Rick Hill |
| Party | Democratic | Republican |
| Running mate | John Walsh | Jon Sonju |
| Popular vote | 236,450 | 228,879 |
| Percentage | 48.9% | 47.3% |
- County results
Governor before election
Brian Schweitzer
Democratic
Elected Governor
Steve Bullock
Democratic

Governor Brian Schweitzer was term-limited in 2012.

The declared Democratic primary candidates were state Senator Larry Jent and state Attorney General Steve Bullock.

The declared Republican primary candidates included Chouteau County commissioner Jim O'Hara, former state senators Corey Stapleton and Ken Miller, terrorism and national security analyst Neil Livingstone, former Congressman Rick Hill, and truck driver Keith Winkler.

Steve Bullock and Rick Hill won their respective primaries. Bullock defeated Hill and Libertarian Ron Vandevender in the general election.

2012 Montana gubernatorial election
| Party | Candidate | Votes | % |
|---|---|---|---|
| Democratic | Steve Bullock | 236,450 | 48.90 |
| Republican | Rick Hill | 228,879 | 47.34 |
| Libertarian | Ron Vandevender | 18,160 | 3.76 |
| Total votes | | 483,489 | 100.00 |
| Democratic hold | | | |

== New Hampshire ==
2012 New Hampshire gubernatorial election
- November 6, 2012
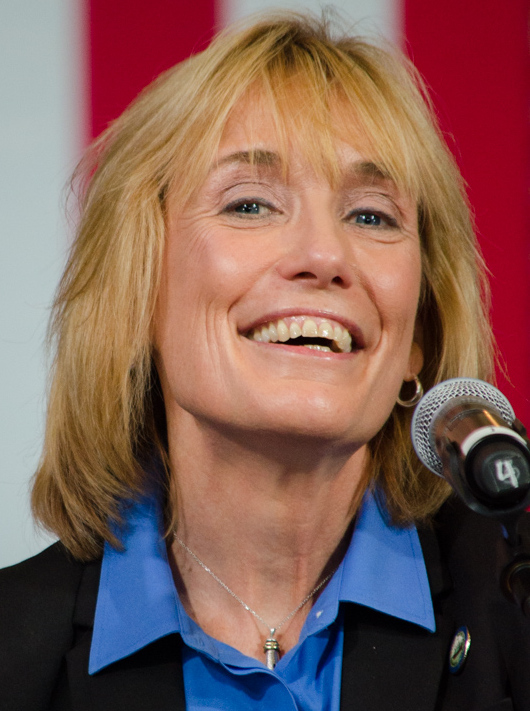

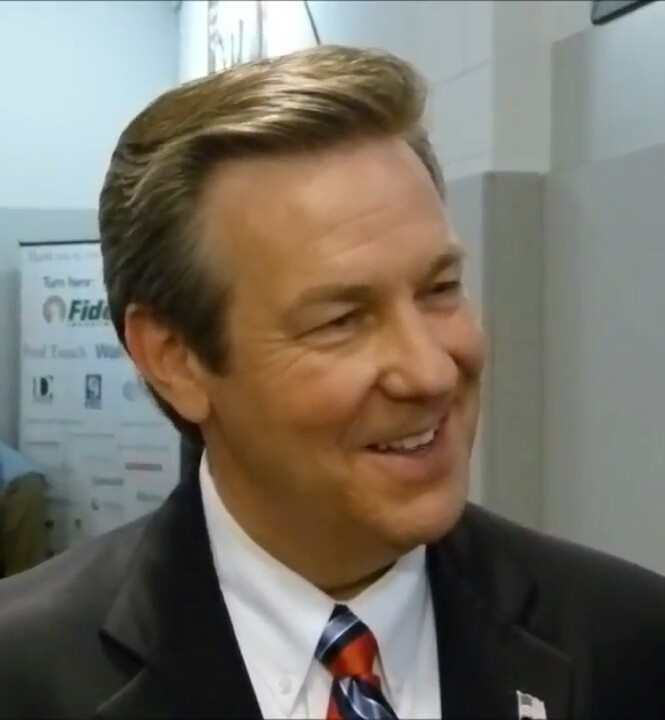
| Nominee | Maggie Hassan | Ovide Lamontagne |
| Party | Democratic | Republican |
| Popular vote | 378,934 | 294,024 |
| Percentage | 54.6% | 42.5% |
- County results
Governor before election
John Lynch
Democratic
Elected Governor
Maggie Hassan
Democratic

Governor John Lynch retired rather than running for re-election.

Maggie Hassan, former Majority Leader of the New Hampshire State Senate, defeated former state senator Jackie Cilley and firefighter Bill Kennedy to become the Democratic nominee. Former chairman of the New Hampshire Board of Education Ovide Lamontagne, who narrowly lost the Republican primary for Senate in 2010, defeated conservative activist and former state representative Kevin Smith and Bill Tarr to win the Republican nomination. Hassan won the general election.

New Hampshire does not have a position of lieutenant governor.

2012 New Hampshire gubernatorial election
| Party | Candidate | Votes | % |
|---|---|---|---|
| Democratic | Maggie Hassan | 378,934 | 54.61 |
| Republican | Ovide Lamontagne | 295,026 | 42.52 |
| Libertarian | John J. Babiarz | 19,251 | 2.77 |
| Write-in | | 666 | 0.10 |
| Total votes | | 693,877 | 100.00 |
| Democratic hold | | | |

== North Carolina ==
2012 North Carolina gubernatorial election
- November 6, 2012
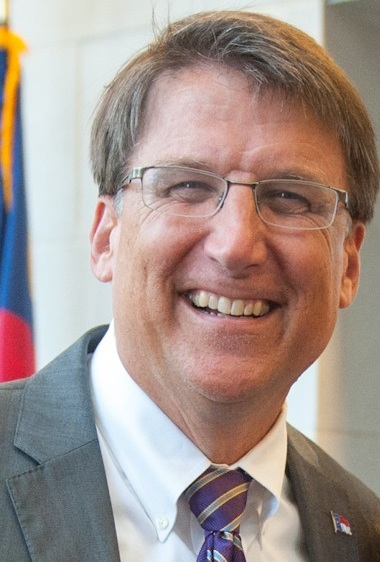

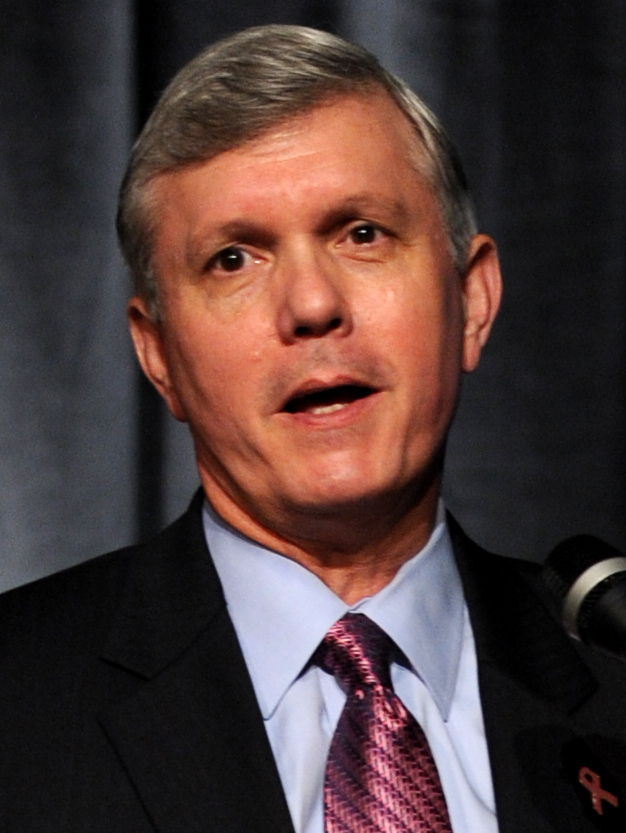
| Nominee | Pat McCrory | Walter Dalton |
| Party | Republican | Democratic |
| Popular vote | 2,440,707 | 1,931,580 |
| Percentage | 54.6% | 43.2% |
- County results
Governor before election
Bev Perdue
Democratic
Elected Governor
Pat McCrory
Republican

Governor Beverly Perdue retired rather than run for re-election.

Walter Dalton and Pat McCrory won their respective primaries, and McCrory won the general election.

The lieutenant governor of North Carolina was elected separately.

2012 North Carolina gubernatorial election
| Party | Candidate | Votes | % |
|---|---|---|---|
| Republican | Pat McCrory | 2,440,707 | 54.62 |
| Democratic | Walter Dalton | 1,931,580 | 43.23 |
| Libertarian | Barbara Howe | 94,652 | 2.12 |
| Write-in | | 1,356 | 0.03 |
| Total votes | | 4,468,295 | 100.00 |
| Republican gain from Democratic | | | |

== North Dakota ==
2012 North Dakota gubernatorial election
- November 6, 2012
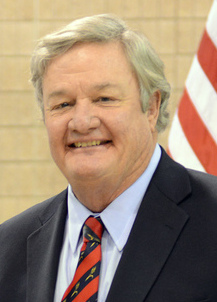

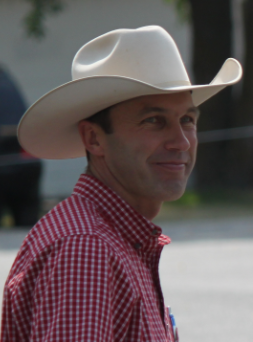
| Nominee | Jack Dalrymple | Ryan Taylor |
| Party | Republican | Democratic–NPL |
| Running mate | Drew Wrigley | Ellen Chaffee |
| Popular vote | 200,525 | 109,048 |
| Percentage | 63.1% | 34.3% |
- County results
Governor before election
Jack Dalrymple
Republican
Elected Governor
Jack Dalrymple
Republican

Governor Jack Dalrymple succeeded John Hoeven after the latter was elected senator, and ran for a full term in 2012. Drew Wrigley was his running mate. Dalrymple defeated architect Paul Sorum for the nomination.

State Senate Minority leader Ryan Taylor was the Democratic nominee. Ellen Chaffee was his running mate. Dalrymple won the general election.

North Dakota gubernatorial election, 2012
| Party | Candidate | Votes | % |
|---|---|---|---|
| Republican | Jack Dalrymple (incumbent) | 200,525 | 63.10 |
| Democratic–NPL | Ryan Taylor | 109,048 | 34.31 |
| Independent | Paul Sorum | 5,356 | 1.69 |
| Independent | Roland C. Riemers | 2,618 | 0.82 |
| Write-in | | 267 | 0.08 |
| Total votes | | 317,814 | 100.00 |
| Republican hold | | | |

== Utah ==
2012 Utah gubernatorial election
- November 6, 2012
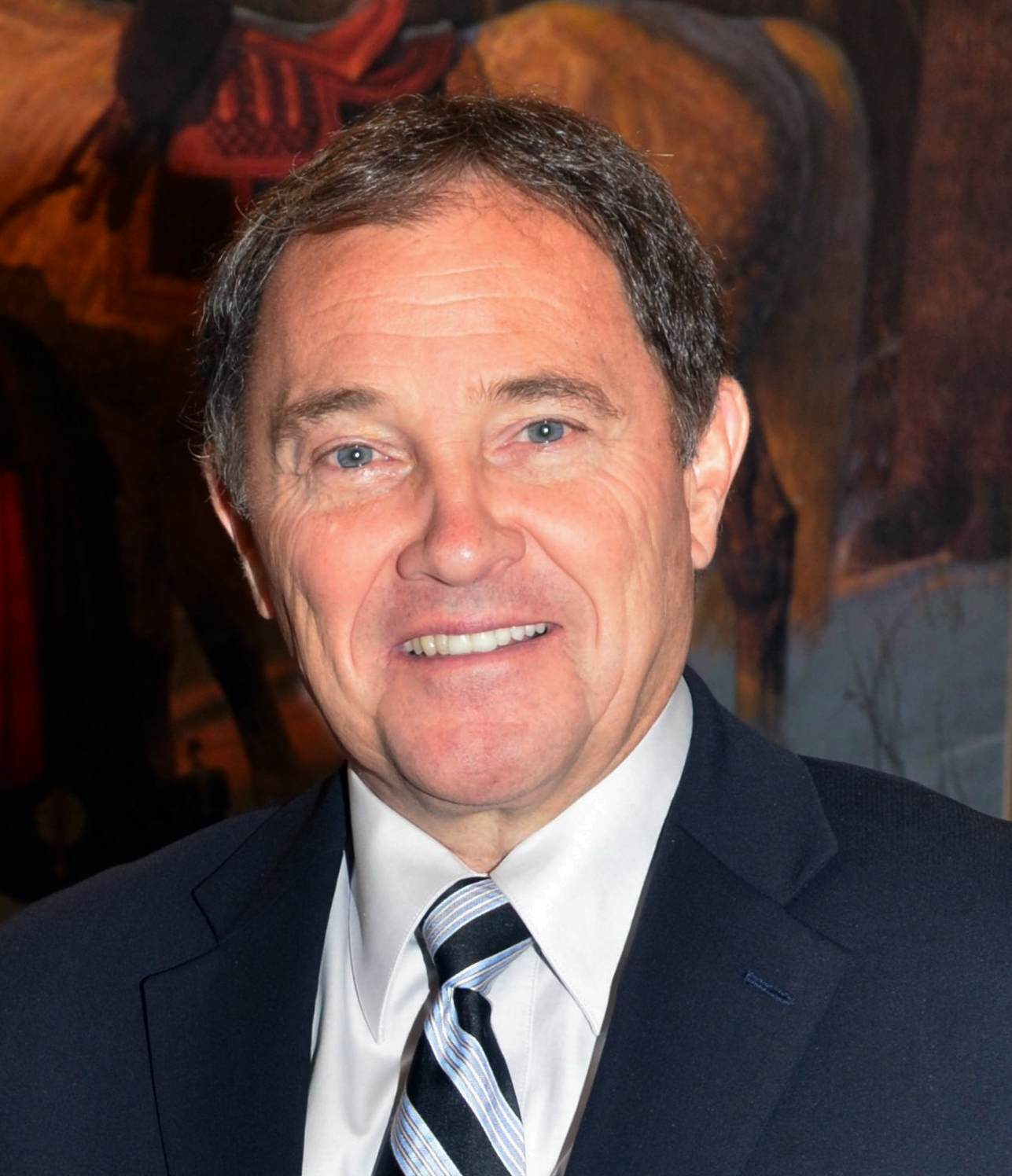

| Nominee | Gary Herbert | Peter Cooke |
| Party | Republican | Democratic |
| Running mate | Greg Bell | Vincent Rampton |
| Popular vote | 624,678 | 253,514 |
| Percentage | 68.4% | 27.7% |
- County results
Governor before election
Gary Herbert
Republican
Elected Governor
Gary Herbert
Republican

Governor Gary Herbert, who won the 2010 gubernatorial special election to finish his predecessor's unfinished term, ran for a full four-year term in 2012.

Democrat Peter Cooke, a businessman and retired major general, opposed him. The Libertarian candidate was medical researcher Ken Larson, and the Constitution party candidate was Kirk D. Pearson. Herbert won the general election.

2012 Utah gubernatorial election
| Party | Candidate | Votes | % |
|---|---|---|---|
| Republican | Gary Herbert (incumbent) | 688,592 | 68.41 |
| Democratic | Peter Cooke | 277,622 | 27.58 |
| Libertarian | Ken Larsen | 22,611 | 2.25 |
| Constitution | Kirk D. Pearson | 17,696 | 1.76 |
| Write-in | | 3 | 0.00 |
| Total votes | | 1,006,524 | 100.00 |
| Republican hold | | | |

== Vermont ==
2012 Vermont gubernatorial election
- November 6, 2012
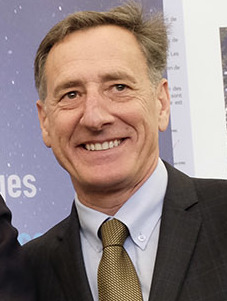

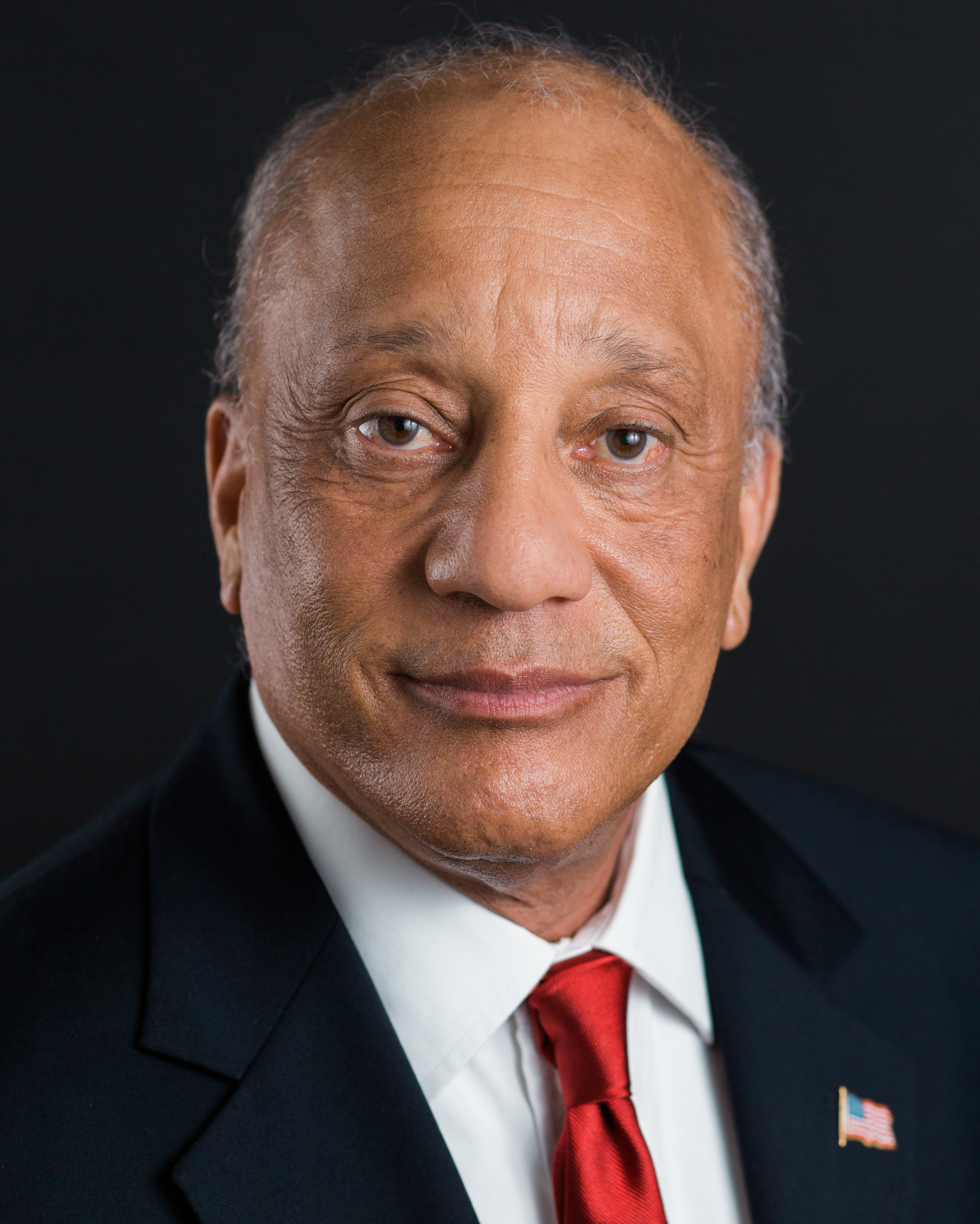
| Nominee | Peter Shumlin | Randy Brock |
| Party | Democratic | Republican |
| Popular vote | 170,749 | 110,940 |
| Percentage | 57.8% | 37.6% |
- County results
Governor before election
Peter Shumlin
Democratic
Elected Governor
Peter Shumlin
Democratic

Governor Peter Shumlin, the victor of the Vermont gubernatorial election of 2010, ran for re-election in 2012. His Republican challenger was state Senator Randy Brock. Shumlin won the general election.

The lieutenant governor was elected separately.

2012 Vermont gubernatorial election
| Party | Candidate | Votes | % |
|---|---|---|---|
| Democratic | Peter Shumlin (incumbent) | 170,749 | 57.80 |
| Republican | Randy Brock | 110,940 | 37.55 |
| Independent | Emily Peyton | 5,868 | 1.99 |
| Marijuana | Cris Ericson | 5,583 | 1.89 |
| Liberty Union | Dave Eagle | 1,303 | 0.44 |
| Write-in | | 969 | 0.33 |
| Total votes | | 295,412 | 100.00 |
| Democratic hold | | | |

== Washington ==
2012 Washington gubernatorial election
- November 6, 2012
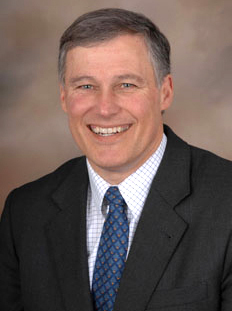

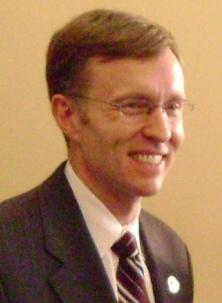
| Nominee | Jay Inslee | Rob McKenna |
| Party | Democratic | Republican |
| Popular vote | 1,582,802 | 1,488,245 |
| Percentage | 51.5% | 48.5% |
- County results
Governor before election
Christine Gregoire
Democratic
Elected Governor
Jay Inslee
Democratic

Governor Christine Gregoire retired rather than run for re-election.

U.S. Representative Jay Inslee was the Democratic nominee.

State Attorney General Rob McKenna was the Republican nominee. U.S. Representative Dave Reichert decided against a bid, and threw his support to McKenna. Inslee won the general election.

The lieutenant governor was elected separately.

2012 Washington gubernatorial election
| Party | Candidate | Votes | % |
|---|---|---|---|
| Democratic | Jay Inslee | 1,582,802 | 51.54% |
| Republican | Rob McKenna | 1,488,245 | 48.46% |
| Total votes | | 3,071,047 | 100.00% |
| Democratic hold | | | |

== West Virginia ==
2012 West Virginia gubernatorial election
- November 6, 2012
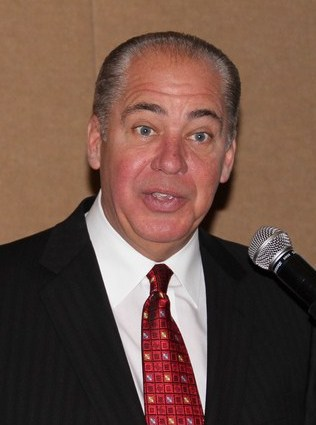

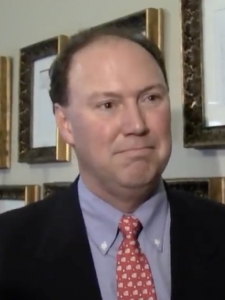
| Nominee | Earl Ray Tomblin | Bill Maloney |
| Party | Democratic | Republican |
| Popular vote | 335,468 | 303,291 |
| Percentage | 50.5% | 45.6% |
- County results
Governor before election
Earl Ray Tomblin
Democratic
Elected Governor
Earl Ray Tomblin
Democratic

The Supreme Court of Appeals of West Virginia ruled on January 18, 2011, that the state must hold a special gubernatorial election in 2011 to fill the vacancy resulting from Joe Manchin's election to the United States Senate. The special election occurred on October 4, 2011, with state Senate President and acting Governor Earl Ray Tomblin won the election. Tomblin was eligible to run for a full term in 2012.

Tomblin's 2011 Republican opponent, businessman Bill Maloney, was the Republican nominee. Tomblin won the election.

David Moran was the Libertarian candidate.

The lieutenant governor was elected by the State Senate.

West Virginia gubernatorial election, 2012
| Party | Candidate | Votes | % |
|---|---|---|---|
| Democratic | Earl Ray Tomblin (incumbent) | 335,468 | 50.49 |
| Republican | Bill Maloney | 303,291 | 45.65 |
| Mountain | Jesse Johnson | 16,787 | 2.53 |
| Libertarian | David Moran | 8,909 | 1.34 |
| Total votes | | 664,455 | 100.00 |
| Democratic hold | | | |

== Wisconsin (recall) ==
Wisconsin gubernatorial recall election
- June 5, 2012
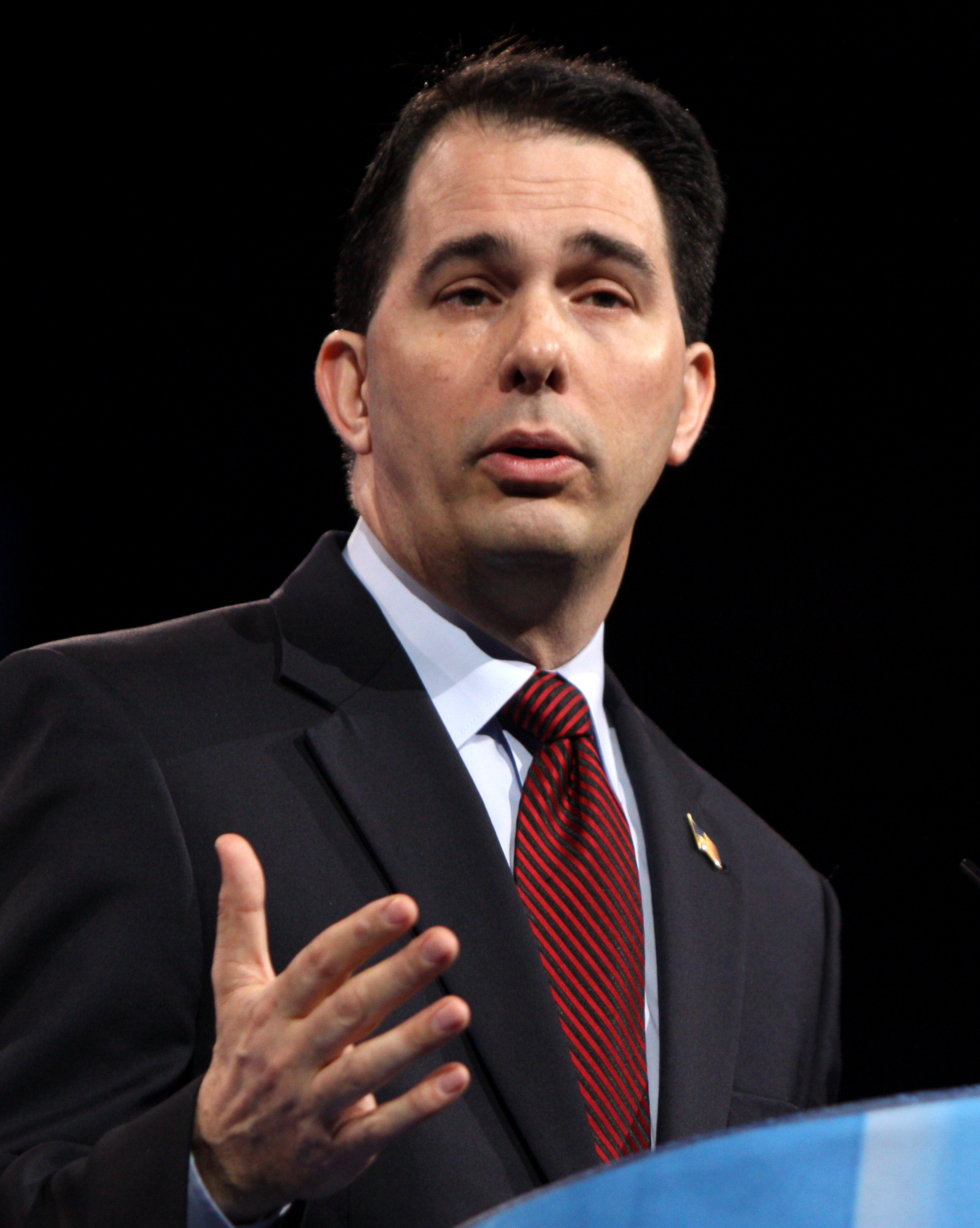

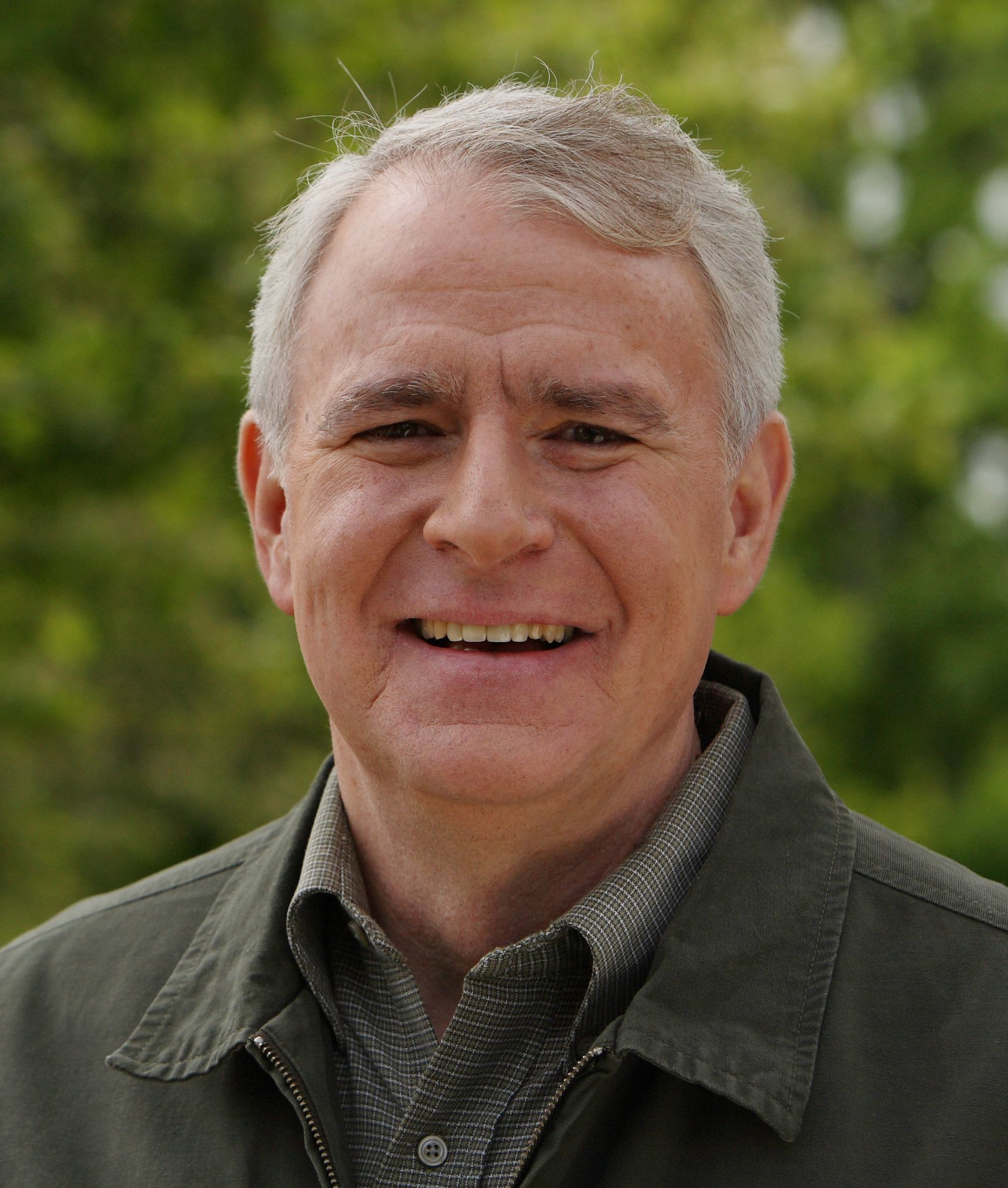
| Nominee | Scott Walker | Tom Barrett |
| Party | Republican | Democratic |
| Popular vote | 1,335,585 | 1,164,480 |
| Percentage | 53.1% | 46.3% |
- County results
Governor before election
Scott Walker
Republican
Elected Governor
Scott Walker
Republican

Governor Scott Walker (R) survived a recall election on June 5. His disapproval ratings varied between 50 and 51%, while his approval ratings varied between 47 and 49% in 2011. Walker had led against challenger Tom Barrett (D) in polls since March, including two post-primary polls which showed Walker with a five- to twelve-point lead. Walker defeated Barrett by seven percentage points, becoming the first governor in U.S. history to survive a recall election.

Wisconsin gubernatorial recall election, 2012
| Party | Candidate | Votes | % |
|---|---|---|---|
| Republican | Scott Walker (incumbent) | 1,335,585 | 53.08 |
| Democratic | Tom Barrett | 1,164,480 | 46.28 |
| Independent | Hariprasad Trivedi | 14,463 | 0.57 |
| Write-in | | 1,537 | 0.06 |
| Total votes | | 2,516,065 | 100.00 |
| Republican hold | | | |

== Territories ==
=== American Samoa ===
2012 American Samoa gubernatorial election
- November 20, 2012
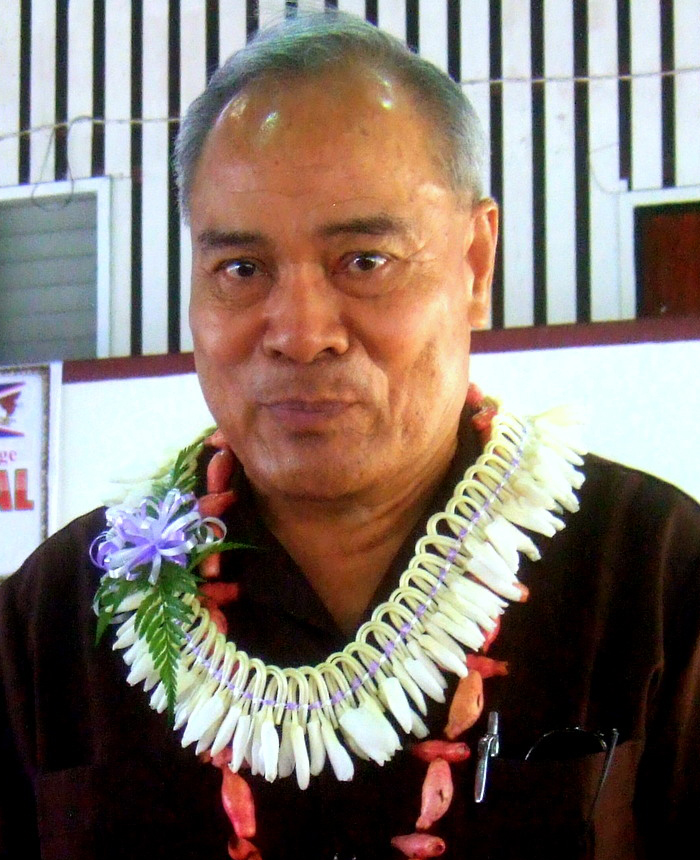

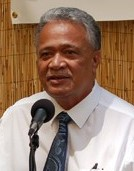
| Nominee | Lolo Matalasi Moliga | Faoa Aitofele Sunia |
| Party | Nonpartisan | Nonpartisan |
| Running mate | Lemanu Peleti Mauga | Taufete'e John Faumuina, Jr. |
| Popular vote | 6,645 | 5,908 |
| Percentage | 52.9% | 47.1% |
Governor before election
Togiola Tulafono
Nonpartisan
Elected Governor
Lolo Letalu Matalasi Moliga
Nonpartisan

Governor Togiola Tulafono, who had served as governor since 2003, was ineligible to run for re-election due to term limits.

Six candidates vied to succeed outgoing Governor Tulafono – former president of American Samoa Community College, Salu Hunkin-Finau; businessman Timothy Jones; former Attorney General Afoa Moega Lutu; former president of the Development Bank of American Samoa, Lolo Letalu Matalasi Moliga; Lieutenant Governor Faoa Aitofele Sunia; and former High Court of American Samoa justice Save Liuato Tuitele. Moliga won the general election.

Election results, governor of American Samoa, November 6, 2012
| Party | Candidate | Votes | % |
|---|---|---|---|
| Nonpartisan | Lolo Letalu Matalasi Moliga | 4,372 | 33.5 |
| Nonpartisan | Faoa Aitofele Sunia | 4,315 | 33.1 |
| Nonpartisan | Afoa Moega Lutu | 2,521 | 19.3 |
| Nonpartisan | Salu Hunkin-Finau | 893 | 6.8 |
| Nonpartisan | Save Liuato Tuitele | 763 | 5.8 |
| Nonpartisan | Timothy Jones | 189 | 1.4 |
| Total votes | | 13,053 | 100 |

Runoff election results, governor of American Samoa, November 20, 2012
| Party | Candidate | Votes | % |
|---|---|---|---|
| Nonpartisan | Lolo Letalu Matalasi Moliga | 6,645 | 52.9 |
| Nonpartisan | Faoa Aitofele Sunia | 5,908 | 47.1 |
| Total votes | | 12,553 | 100 |

=== Puerto Rico ===
2012 Puerto Rico gubernatorial election
- November 6, 2012
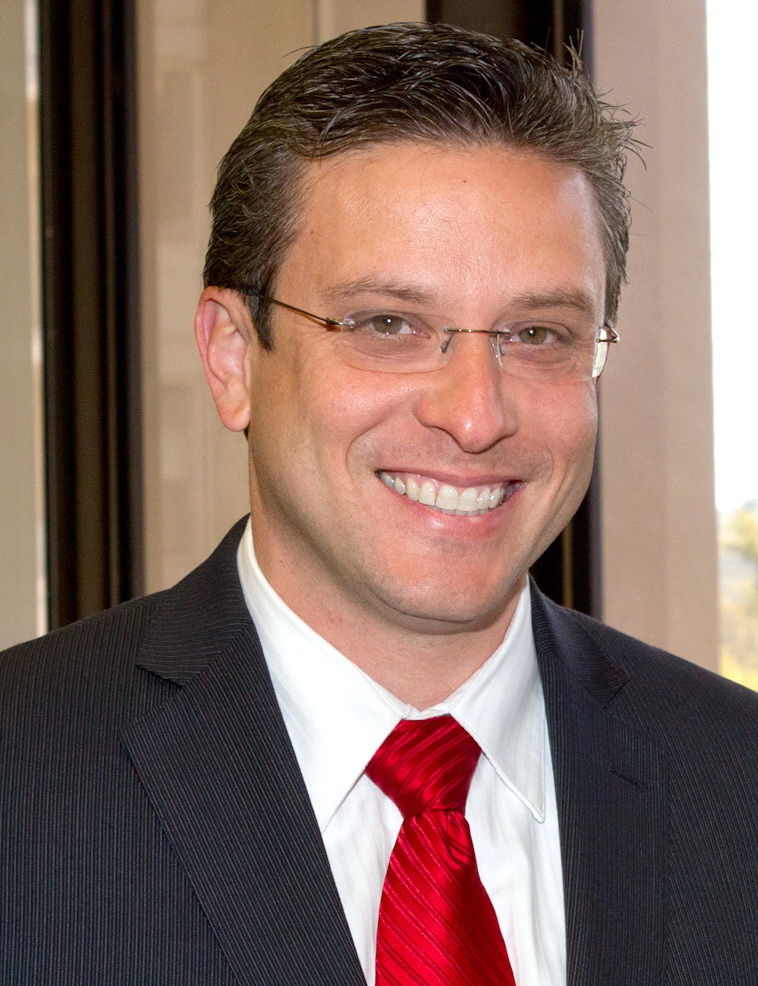

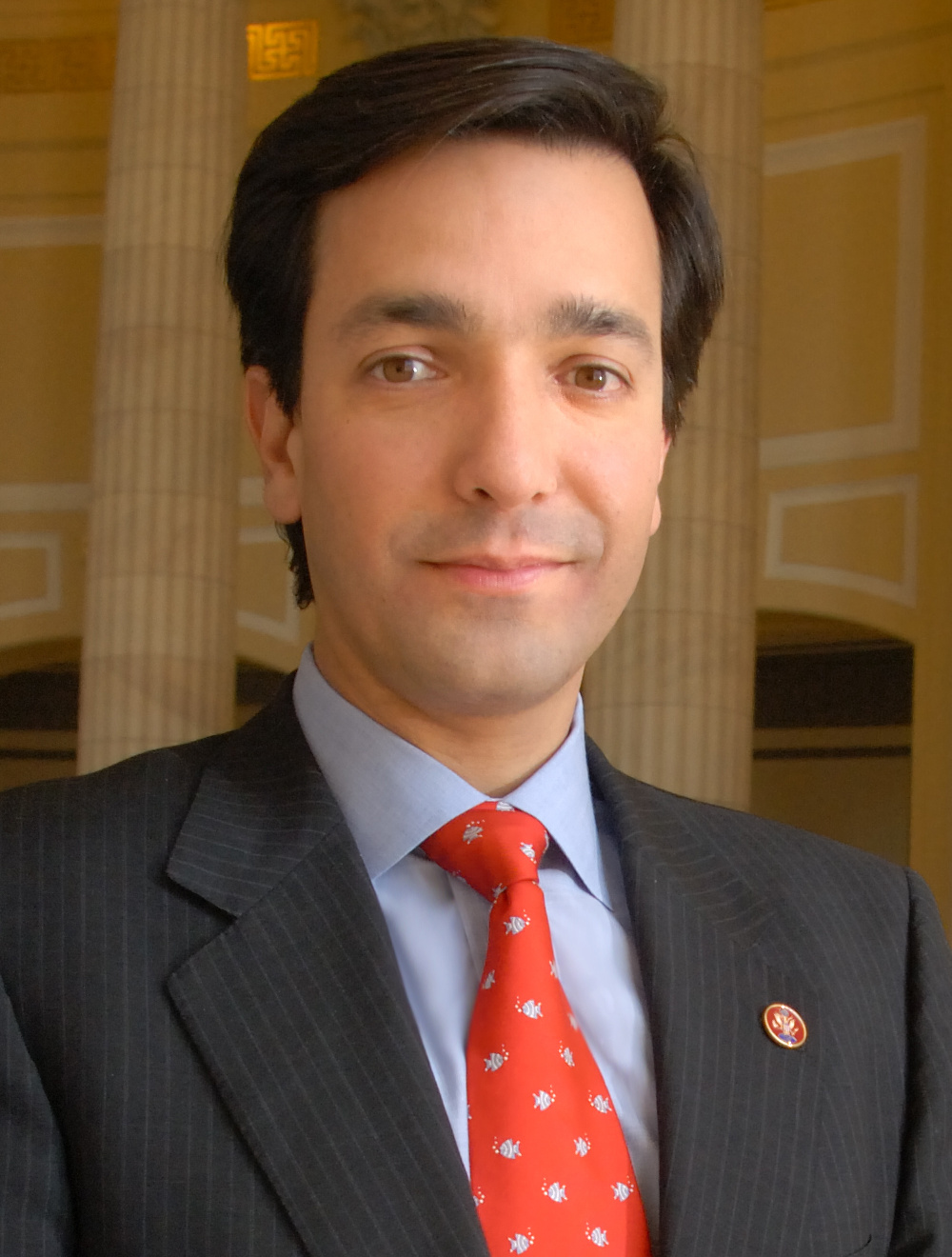
| Nominee | Alejandro García Padilla | Luis Fortuño |
| Party | Popular Democratic | New Progressive |
| Alliance | Democratic | Republican |
| Popular vote | 896,060 | 884,775 |
| Percentage | 47.7% | 47.1% |
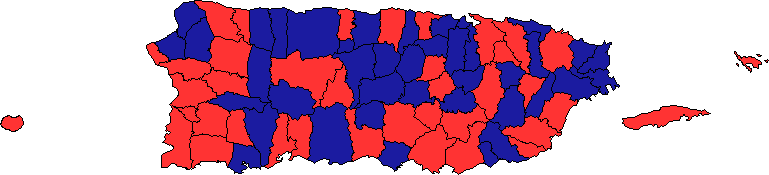
- Municipality results
Governor before election
Luis Fortuño
New Progressive
Elected Governor
Alejandro Garcia Padilla
Popular Democratic

Governor Luis Fortuño (PNP/R) ran for re-election.

Fortuño had been mentioned as a long-shot potential Republican nominee for president or vice president in 2012. However, he announced on June 26, 2011, that he would run for re-election instead of seeking the presidency.

Senator Alejandro García Padilla (PPD) was the net biggest challenger out of six challengers, and won the general election.

Puerto Rico does not have a position of lieutenant governor.

Puerto Rico gubernatorial election, 2012
| Party | Candidate | Votes | % |
|---|---|---|---|
| Popular Democratic | Alejandro García Padilla | 896,060 | 47.73 |
| New Progressive | Luis Fortuño | 884,775 | 47.13 |
| Independence | Juan Dalmau Ramírez | 47,331 | 2.52 |
| Worker's People Party of Puerto Rico | Rafael Bernabe | 18,312 | 0.98 |
| Movimiento Unión Soberanista | Arturo Hernández | 10,523 | 0.56 |
| Puerto Ricans for Puerto Rico | Rogelio Figueroa | 6,668 | 0.36 |
| Write-in | | 13,562 | 0.73 |
| Total votes | | 1,877,179 | 100.00 |
| Popular Democratic gain from New Progressive | | | |
| Democratic gain from Republican | | | |

== See also ==
- 2012 United States elections
  - 2012 United States presidential election
  - 2012 United States Senate elections
  - 2012 United States House of Representatives elections
