= 2012 Puerto Rican constitutional referendum =

Ballot measure in Puerto Rico

A constitutional referendum was held in Puerto Rico on 19 August 2012. Voters were asked whether they approve of two amendments to the constitution: one to eliminate the absolute right to bail and the other to decrease the number of members of the Legislative Assembly. Despite support from the party in government and part of the main opposition party, both amendments were rejected by voters.

== Background ==
On January 9, 2012, Puerto Rican Governor Luis Fortuño signed the project for a Legislative Reform that would reduce the number of legislators. According to Fortuño, this would result in a decrease in the expenses associated with the operation of the Legislative Assembly. To achieve this, the constitution has to be amended, which would require a referendum to the people.

On May 10, 2012, the Senate approved a resolution that proposed another amendment to the Constitution, this time to eliminate the absolute right to bail, specifically in murder cases, and others. Governor Fortuño signed the resolution on May 15, agreeing to hold the referendum for both constitutional amendments on August 19, 2012.

Former Governors Rafael Hernández Colón, Carlos Romero Barceló, and Pedro Rosselló, had tried unsuccessfully to eliminate the absolute right for bail during their tenures. Rosselló was the only one to hold a referendum in 1994, but people voted against the amendment.

== Proposed amendments ==
=== Article III ===
The first amendment applies to Article III, Sections 2, 3, 4, and 7. It proposes to reduce the members of the Legislative Assembly from 78 to 56. Specifically:

- the number of senators would be reduced from 27 to 17 (11 district senators and 6 at-large)
- the number of representatives would be reduced from 51 to 39 (33 district representatives and 6 at-large)

This would require increasing the number of senatorial districts from 8 to 11, while reducing the representative districts from 40 to 33.

=== Article II ===
The second amendment applies to Article II, Sections 11. It proposes to eliminate the absolute right to bail, specifically in cases of those accused of:

- premeditated murder
- murder during a home invasion
- murder during a kidnapping or sexual aggression
- murder while shooting a firearm from a motor vehicle or in a public place
- murdering a police officer while on duty

In those cases, the judge will have the discretion of conceding or denying bail, after evaluating if the accused represents a risk to others or to the case.

== Voting process ==
Both proposed amendments were presented to the voters in a ballot, with two questions. Each question asked if they approved the proposed amendment, to which the voters answered in a "Yes" or "No" checkbox to each question. Each ballot also presented the proposed amendment as it would have been featured in the Constitution of Puerto Rico, if it had won.

The ballot format was criticized by various groups, who considered it "difficult to read", according to José Acarón, state director of the AARP. Roberto Aponte, electoral commissioner for the Puerto Rican Independence Party (PIP) also stated that the ballot would be "troublesome to read". Ramón Jiménez, director of the referendum scrutiny, assured that the ballot was readable, but also said that voting colleges would have enlarged ballots for anyone who needed them.

Prisons in Puerto Rico held the voting process for the referendum on August 17, 2012 with approximately 8,350 of 11,800 prisoners participating. Former Speaker of the Puerto Rican House of Representatives and convict Edison Misla Aldarondo voted in a Bayamón prison. He said to a newspaper that he voted in favor of eliminating the absolute right for bail because "it is a mechanism to deal with the crime situation." However, he voted against the proposed Legislative Reform saying that "quality and quantity are two different things".

On August 19, 2012, 3,151 voting colleges opened at 8:00am and closed at 3:00pm.

== Campaign ==
=== Opponents ===
Reaction to the proposed amendments was mixed, with several groups deciding to campaign against them answering "No" to each question. A coalition group called Frente Amplio de Puerto Rico: Mesa Amplia de Diálogo decided to campaign against both amendments and declared August 17, 2012 to be the "Day of No and No". The group is formed by new parties Movimiento Unión Soberanista (MUS), Puerto Ricans for Puerto Rico Party (PPR), and the Worker's People Party of Puerto Rico (PPT), along with groups like the Alianza Pro Libre Asociación Soberana (ALAS), Church's Council, and the Ecumenic Coalition.

The Puerto Rican Independence Party (PIP) is campaigning against both amendments, arguing that the proposed Legislative Reform would "crush minorities" by increasing the number of votes that minority candidates would need to be elected. Several weeks before the referendum, they also argued that there was still confusion among the voters, and that electoral participation will be around 20%.

Héctor Pesquera, co-president of the Hostosian National Independence Movement (MINH) asked people to vote against the amendments arguing that eliminating the absolute right to bail won't be a solution to the rising crime rate in the island. The members of the Ateneo Puertorriqueño, one of the main cultural institutions of the island, also wrote a statement against the amendments calling them an "attempt on people's rights".

Various leaders within the Popular Democratic Party (PPD) campaigned against the amendments. Former Governor Aníbal Acevedo Vilá posted a video on his blog in which he asked people to vote "No". The former President of the Senate, Miguel Hernández Agosto, and former gubernatorial candidate, Victoria Muñoz Mendoza, also stated their opposition to the amendments. Current candidates Rafael Cox Alomar, Eduardo Bhatia and Carmen Yulín Cruz also said they were against the amendments, despite the position of the president of the party and current gubernatorial candidate Alejandro García Padilla to vote in favor.

Human rights activist Pedro Julio Serrano expressed himself against the amendments, arguing that the problem wasn't the bail, but rather that "7 out of 10 cases are solved". He also offered statistics from the Legal Assistance Association that showed that, out of 100 persons accused of murder during a year, only eight received the benefit of freedom while awaiting their trial.

The Puerto Rico Association of Criminal Defense Lawyers (PRACDL) also expressed themselves against the amendments. In their statement, they argued that "preventive detention hasn't contributed to make Puerto Rico, or United States, a safer place for their citizens, nor does it contribute to a culture of respect to the rights of others."

In August 2012, Puerto Rican singer/actor Ricky Martin posted on his website "To amend the Constitution goes beyond party ideologies. Don't let fear and frustration decide your vote. The rights we already have shouldn't be relinquished." René Pérez, from Calle 13, also invited people to vote "No" to the amendments. Pérez wrote on his Facebook page "You wouldn't amputate an arm or a leg, unless it was to save your life. The same happens with freedom. The right for bail is part of it. You shouldn't vote to have a part of you amputated. Think. If one day you're wrongly accused, you should have the right to be free while you wait to prove it" and added "Limit the weapons, not our rights."

A group of artists under the name of Artistas en Defensa al Derecho a la Fianza also made statements against the proposed amendments to the Constitution. The group, led by actor Luis Enrique Romero, included artists from several branches like actresses Ineabelle Colón, Amneris Morales, Magali Carrasquillo, and Anamín Santiago; folk singers José Antonio "Tony Mapeyé" Rivera and Eduardo Villanueva; singers/musicians Irvin García and Pepe Sánchez; painter Pablo Marcano, and photographer Félix Guayciba. During a press conference, actress Amneris Morales called the current government "a dictatorship", while fellow actress Carrasquillo argued that "not everybody will be accused with the same severity".

The parents of Karla Michelle Negrón, a 15-year-old girl that was killed by a stray bullet during New Year's Eve, said they would vote against the amendments, stating that it "simplifies a bigger problem" and that it "won't help fight against crime".

=== Proponents ===
Governor Luis Fortuño and his party, New Progressive Party (PNP), campaigned in favor of the proposed amendments. Most of the leaders of the party support him and will campaign with him. Thomas Rivera Schatz, President of the Senate of Puerto Rico, asked voters to participate of the referendum and encouraged them to vote in favor of the amendments. Also, a group of chiefs of agencies made statements in favor of the amendments. The group, led by Chief of Staff Miguel Romero, included Guillermo Somoza (Justice), Yanitzia Irizarry (Family), Miguel Hernández Vivoni (Housing), Jesús F. Méndez (Treasury), Henry Neumann (Sports and Recreation), and Jesús González (Correction).

Alejandro García Padilla, current senator and gubernatorial candidate for the opposing Popular Democratic Party (PPD), also expressed he would vote in favor of the amendments. His posture came as a surprise, since he voted against the resolution in the Senate of Puerto Rico. He said that "with the referendum already approved and in the absence of other legislative mechanisms like the ones we have proposed during this term to fight against crime, I express myself in favor of this amendment and I will vote accordingly." Former governors Sila María Calderón and Rafael Hernández Colón expressed themselves in favor of the amendments, along with other members of the party like Sila María González Calderón, Luis Raúl Torres Cruz, Jorge Colberg Toro, and others.

A group of judges, including Efraín Rivera Pérez, a former judge of the Supreme Court of Puerto Rico, and Héctor Laffitte, former federal judge, expressed themselves in favor of the amendments. Also, former two-time Superintendent of the Puerto Rico Police Department, Pedro Toledo, expressed himself in favor of the amendments. He added that some guidelines could be needed to allow judges to define the issue of the dangerousness of the accused.

Astrologer Walter Mercado said on a statement that he favored both amendments to the Constitution. He wrote that he considered the amendment on the right to bail to be an important tool on the fight against crime, and that it was "a step ahead in the control of the rising crime rate." He added that the amendment would "protect good and decent people from criminals that used their time on bail to threaten witnesses and commit more crimes."

=== Advertisements ===
The New Progressive Party (PNP) published advertisements in favor of the amendments using the pictures of two young men recently accused of murder. The pictures, taken after their arrests, show both men with their middle fingers to the camera. The advertisement reads "If you don't vote, they win". The mother of one of the men in the picture, Vilmarie Carrasquillo, presented a preliminary injunction to withdraw the advertisement, arguing that his son's right for privacy was violated. However, the San Juan Court determined that the PNP could continue using the advertisement. Two days before the referendum, the Supreme Court ratified the decision of the Court of San Juan allowing the PNP to continue with their campaign.

== Opinion polls ==
A poll by local newspaper El Nuevo Día was published on August 12, 2012. The poll had the following results:

- 59% support the elimination of the absolute right for bail, against a 27% opposition. 14% was still undecided.
- 76% support the decrease in the number of legislators, against a 13% opposition. 11% was still undecided.

The poll, which was designed and analyzed by Kaagan Research Associates, included a sample of 1,000 people and could produce an error of ±3%.

== Results ==
The first preliminary results were announced by the State Elections Commission of Puerto Rico at around 4:00. At around 6:25pm, Luis Fortuño's campaign director Angel Cintrón announced that there was a tendency against the amendments in the results so far. During a press conference, he said "It's not what we expected, it's different to our projections, and we have to accept it." However, he added that the results weren't definitive yet since there were still more than 50% of votes to count. Thomas Rivera Schatz, President of the Senate of Puerto Rico, also acknowledged the defeat saying that the amendments his party had proposed "weren't accepted and that people don't want to amend the Constitution". He added that there could have been some misinformation in the process. The results on the absolute bail bill means that "Puerto Rico remains the only place in the Western Hemisphere where everyone is entitled to bail regardless of the alleged crime."

The final results, according to the State Elections Commission of Puerto Rico, were:

Eliminate the right for absolute bail
Choice	Votes	%
For	364,169	44.82
Against	448,272	55.18
Total	812,441	100.00
Valid votes	812,441	99.22
Invalid/blank votes	6,371	0.78
Total votes	818,812	100.00
Registered voters/turnout	2,306,769	35.50
Source: CEE

Change the number of legislators
Choice	Votes	%
For	371,042	45.72
Against	440,453	54.28
Total	811,495	100.00
Valid votes	811,495	99.10
Invalid/blank votes	7,409	0.90
Total votes	818,904	100.00
Registered voters/turnout	2,306,769	35.50
Source: CEE

== Aftermath ==
At 7:00pm, Governor Luis Fortuño held a press conference, along with Pedro Pierluisi, where he conceded the defeat of the "Yes" camp. In his message, he said that "this isn't about one party or one government" and assured those that supported him that they would keep on working "outside of party lines, so that everyone can be part of the solution". On the other hand, Senator and PPD gubernatorial candidate Alejandro García Padilla blamed Fortuño and Pierluisi for the loss during a press conference.

At the Puerto Rico Bar Association, groups that were against the amendments started celebrating the preliminary results. Former Governor Aníbal Acevedo Vilá celebrated the victory saying that "reason triumphed over fear and money". The PIP gubernatorial candidate Juan Dalmau Ramírez said that the defeat represented a "moral defeat" for both Fortuño and García Padilla.
