= Arturo Hernández (lawyer) =

Puerto Rican lawyer

Arturo Luis Hernández González is a Puerto Rican attorney who was a gubernatorial candidate in the 2012 Puerto Rican election for the Movimiento Unión Soberanista. Hernández also presided the Bar Association of Puerto Rico from 2008 to 2012.

== Professional career ==
Arturo Hernández was born on February 7, 1957, in Hato Rey, Puerto Rico. His father and his uncle were attorneys, which gave him an interest in the legal profession from an early age. Graduated from high school at Colegio Bautista in Carolina, Puerto Rico. He received his bachelor's degree from the University of Puerto Rico in Río Piedras, where he was a part of the Honor Roll. After that, he went to the Interamerican University of Puerto Rico School of Law becoming an attorney.

After graduating, he worked for several months in the Law Faculty of the Interamerican University of Puerto Rico as a paralegal. He then became Executive Director of an association that serviced rehabilitated former convicts and addicts. During that time, he worked closely with the Director of Corrections Mercedes Otero de Ramos. Hernández then became Director of the Legal Division in the Corrections Department, and the legal advisor of Otero de Ramos until 1990.

In 1990, Hernández opened his private practice, offering his services in various legal areas. In 2008, he was elected as President of the Bar Association of Puerto Rico. He served as such until 2012.

== Political career ==
Hernández became one of the members of the Movimiento Unión Soberanista, one of several new parties that surfaced in Puerto Rico for the 2012 general elections. He was one of the candidates to the Senate of Puerto Rico. However, when gubernatorial candidate, Enrique Vázquez Quintana, withdrew his candidacy, the party chose Hernández as his replacement. Later that year, Hernández campaigned against the constitutional amendments proposed by the current government in the constitutional referendum held in August 2012.

In 2016, Hernandez, not running for a position, announced his support for Maria de Lourdes Santiago and the Puerto Rico Independence Party.

== Personal life ==
Hernández is married to Anita, with whom he has three children.
