= 2012 Missouri gubernatorial election =

- November 6, 2012
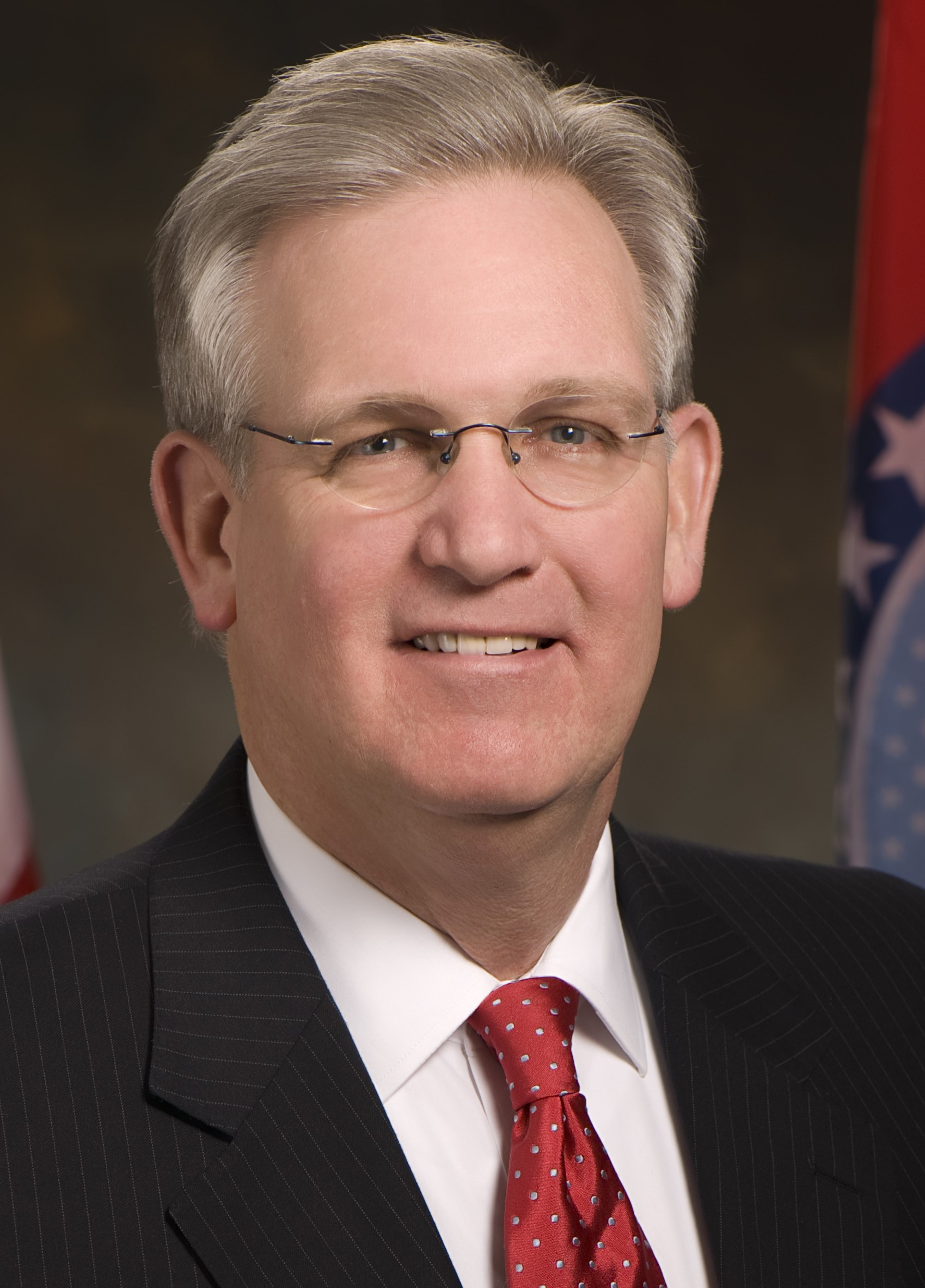

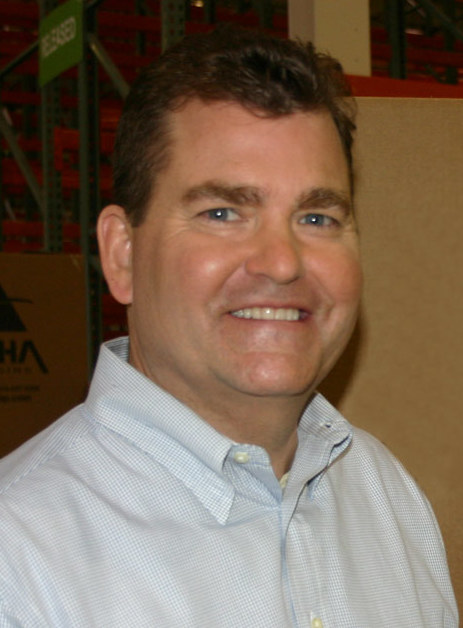
Nominee	Jay Nixon	Dave Spence
Party	Democratic	Republican
Popular vote	1,494,056	1,160,265
Percentage	54.77%	42.53%
- Nixon: 40–50% 50–60% 60–70% 80–90% Spence: 40–50% 50–60% 60–70%
Governor before election
Jay Nixon
Democratic
Elected Governor
Jay Nixon
Democratic

The 2012 Missouri gubernatorial election was held on November 6, 2012, to elect the Governor of Missouri. Incumbent Democratic Governor Jay Nixon won re-election against the Republican nominee, businessman Dave Spence, despite incumbent President Barack Obama losing Missouri on the same day to Republican nominee Mitt Romney. As of 2025, this is the last time a Democrat won the governorship of Missouri and the last time that a governor and lieutenant governor of different political parties were simultaneously elected in Missouri. Primary elections took place on August 5, 2012.

== Democratic primary ==
=== Candidates ===
==== Nominee ====
- Jay Nixon, incumbent governor

==== Eliminated in primary ====
- William Campbell
- Clay Thunderhawk

=== Results ===
Democratic primary results
Party	Candidate	Votes	%
Democratic	Jay Nixon (incumbent)	269,865	86.0%
Democratic	William Campbell	25,721	8.2%
Democratic	Clay Thunderhawk	18,228	5.8%
Total votes		313,814	100.0%

== Republican primary ==
=== Candidates ===
==== Nominee ====
- Dave Spence, businessman

==== Eliminated in primary ====
- Bill Randles, businessman and corporate defense lawyer
- Fred Sauer, investment executive and anti-abortion activist
- John Weiler

=== Polling ===
Poll source	Date(s) administered	Sample size	Margin of error	Bill Randles	Fred Sauer	Dave Spence	John Weiler	Undecided
Public Policy Polling	August 4–5, 2012	590	± 4.0%	15%	12%	42%	3%	29%
Mason-Dixon	July 23–25, 2012	400	± 5.0%	15%	1%	41%	3%	40%
Public Policy Polling	May 24–27, 2012	430	± 4.7%	11%	4%	32%	1%	43%
Public Policy Polling	January 27–29, 2012	574	± 4.1%	15%	—	11%	—	74%

=== Results ===
Republican primary results
Party	Candidate	Votes	%
Republican	Dave Spence	333,578	59.9%
Republican	Bill Randles	90,651	16.3%
Republican	Fred Sauer	83,695	15.0%
Republican	John Weiler	49,006	8.8%
Total votes		556,930	100.0%

== Libertarian primary ==
=== Candidates ===
- Jim Higgins, former officer of the Libertarian Party of Missouri

=== Denied ballot access ===
- Leonard Steinman

=== Results ===
Libertarian primary results
Party	Candidate	Votes	%
Libertarian	Jim Higgins	2,500	100.0%
Total votes		2,500	100.0%

== General election ==
=== Debates ===
- Complete video of debate, C-SPAN, September 21, 2012

=== Predictions ===
Source	Ranking	As of
The Cook Political Report	Lean D	November 1, 2012
Sabato's Crystal Ball	Likely D	November 5, 2012
Inside Elections	Likely D	November 2, 2012
Real Clear Politics	Lean D	November 5, 2012

=== Polling ===
Poll source	Date(s) administered	Sample size	Margin of error	Jay Nixon (D)	Dave Spence (R)	Other	Undecided
Public Policy Polling	November 2–3, 2012	835	± 3.4%	53%	45%	—	2%
SurveyUSA	October 28–November 3, 2012	589	± 4.1%	48%	39%	5%	8%
Mason-Dixon	October 23–25, 2012	625	± 4%	48%	42%	—	9%
Public Policy Polling	October 19–21, 2012	582	± 4.1%	51%	40%	—	8%
Public Policy Polling	October 1–3, 2012	700	± 3.7%	54%	35%	—	12%
Public Policy Polling	August 20, 2012	500	± 4.4%	46%	37%	—	16%
Survey USA	August 9–12, 2012	585	± 4.1%	51%	37%	5%	6%
Chilenski Strategies	August 8, 2012	663	± 3.8%	53%	39%	—	9%
Mason-Dixon	July 23–25, 2012	625	± 4.0%	48%	39%	—	13%
Public Policy Polling	May 24–27, 2012	602	± 4.0%	45%	34%	—	21%
Public Policy Polling	January 27–29, 2012	582	± 4.1%	47%	27%	—	26%

Hypothetical polling

Republican primary

Poll source	Date(s) administered	Sample size	Margin of error	Peter Kinder	Bill Randles	Undecided
Public Policy Polling	September 9–12, 2011	400	± 4.9%	34%	14%	53%

Poll source	Date(s) administered	Sample size	Margin of error	Peter Kinder	Someone else	Undecided
Public Policy Polling	September 9–12, 2011	400	± 4.9%	22%	35%	43%

General election

Poll source	Date(s) administered	Sample size	Margin of error	Jay Nixon (D)	Bill Randles (R)	Other	Undecided
Mason-Dixon	July 23–25, 2012	625	± 4.0%	50%	35%	—	15%
Public Policy Polling	May 24–27, 2012	602	± 4.0%	46%	32%	—	22%
Public Policy Polling	January 27–29, 2012	582	± 4.1%	47%	29%	—	24%
Public Policy Polling	September 9–12, 2011	632	± 3.9%	45%	24%	—	30%

Poll source	Date(s) administered	Sample size	Margin of error	Jay Nixon (D)	Matt Blunt (R)	Other	Undecided
Public Policy Polling	September 9–12, 2011	632	± 3.9%	50%	37%	—	13%
Public Policy Polling	April 28-May 1, 2011	555	± 3.9%	48%	38%	—	13%

Poll source	Date(s) administered	Sample size	Margin of error	Jay Nixon (D)	John Danforth (R)	Other	Undecided
Public Policy Polling	September 9–12, 2011	632	± 3.9%	39%	45%	—	17%

Poll source	Date(s) administered	Sample size	Margin of error	Jay Nixon (D)	Kenny Hulshof (R)	Other	Undecided
Public Policy Polling	April 28-May 1, 2011	555	± 3.9%	51%	34%	—	15%

Poll source	Date(s) administered	Sample size	Margin of error	Jay Nixon (D)	Peter Kinder (R)	Other	Undecided
Public Policy Polling	September 9–12, 2011	632	± 3.9%	50%	31%	—	18%
Public Policy Polling	April 28-May 1, 2011	555	± 3.9%	48%	34%	—	18%
Public Policy Polling	March 3–6, 2011	612	± 4.0%	45%	38%	—	17%
Public Policy Polling	Nov. 29-December 1, 2010	515	± 4.3%	47%	39%	—	14%

Poll source	Date(s) administered	Sample size	Margin of error	Jay Nixon (D)	Sarah Steelman (R)	Other	Undecided
Public Policy Polling	Nov. 29-December 1, 2010	515	± 4.3%	46%	35%	—	19%

Poll source	Date(s) administered	Sample size	Margin of error	Jay Nixon (D)	Jim Talent (R)	Other	Undecided
Public Policy Polling	September 9–12, 2011	632	± 3.9%	47%	38%	—	14%

=== Results ===
Nixon won by a comfortable 12.3% margin, though this was somewhat closer than his 2008 victory. Even with President Barack Obama losing the state by a nine-point margin, Nixon and Senator Claire McCaskill both won reelection easily. Like his Senatorial colleague, Nixon was able to get a huge number of votes from rural areas. Both Nixon and McCaskill were declared the winners of their respective races even before the known Democratic strongholds of St. Louis and Kansas City came in.

Missouri gubernatorial election, 2012
Party	Candidate	Votes	%	±%
Democratic	Jay Nixon (incumbent)	1,494,056	54.77%	−3.63%
Republican	Dave Spence	1,160,265	42.53%	+3.04%
Libertarian	Jim Higgins	73,509	2.70%	+1.59%
Write-in		53	0.00%	0.00%
Total votes		2,727,883	100.00%	N/A
Democratic hold				

==== Counties that flipped from Republican to Democratic ====
- Audrain (largest city: Mexico)
- Clark (largest city: Kahoka)
- Knox (largest city: Edina)
- Lewis (largest city: Canton)
- Mississippi (largest city: Charleston)
- Monroe (largest city: Monroe City)

==== Counties that flipped from Democratic to Republican ====
- Andrew (largest city: Savannah)
- Atchison (largest city: Tarkio)
- Benton (largest city: Warsaw)
- Caldwell (largest city: Hamilton)
- Camden (largest city: Osage Beach)
- Carter (largest city: Van Buren)
- Cass (largest city: Harrisonville)
- Cedar (largest city: El Dorado Springs)
- Crawford (largest city: Cuba)
- Dallas (largest city: Buffalo)
- Daviess (largest city: Gallatin)
- Dent (largest city: Salem)
- Douglas (largest city: Ava)
- Gentry (largest city: Albany)
- Howell (largest city: West Plains)
- Laclede (largest city: Lebanon)
- Lincoln (largest city: Troy)
- Livingston (largest city: Chillicothe)
- Maries (largest city: Belle)
- Morgan (largest city: Versailles)
- Oregon (largest city: Thayer)
- Ozark (largest city: Gainesville)
- Phelps (largest city: Rolla)
- Polk (largest city: Bolivar)
- Pulaski (largest city: Fort Leonard Wood)
- Ripley (largest city: Doniphan)
- St. Clair (largest city: Appleton City)
- Texas (largest city: Licking)
- Vernon (largest city: Nevada)
- Webster (largest city: Marshfield)

==== By congressional district ====
Nixon won five of eight congressional districts, including three that elected Republicans.

District	Nixon	Spence	Representative
1st	81.38%	13.21%	Lacy Clay
2nd	50.67%	47.37%	Todd Akin (112th Congress)
2nd	50.67%	47.37%	Ann Wagner (113th Congress)
3rd	48.20%	49.08%	Russ Carnahan (112th Congress)
3rd	48.20%	49.08%	Blaine Luetkemeyer (113th Congress)
4th	49.16%	47.46%	Vicky Hartzler
5th	66.00%	31.20%	Emanuel Cleaver
6th	50.09%	46.96%	Sam Graves
7th	43.75%	53.39%	Billy Long
8th	48.27%	49.06%	Jo Ann Emerson

== See also ==
- 2012 United States gubernatorial elections
- 2012 United States Senate election in Missouri
- 2012 United States House of Representatives elections in Missouri
- 2012 United States presidential election in Missouri
- 2012 Missouri lieutenant gubernatorial election
- 2012 Missouri Attorney General election
- 2012 Missouri State Treasurer election
- 2012 Missouri Secretary of State election
- Political party strength in Missouri
