= 2008 Puerto Rican general election =

- November 4, 2008
- Gubernatorial election
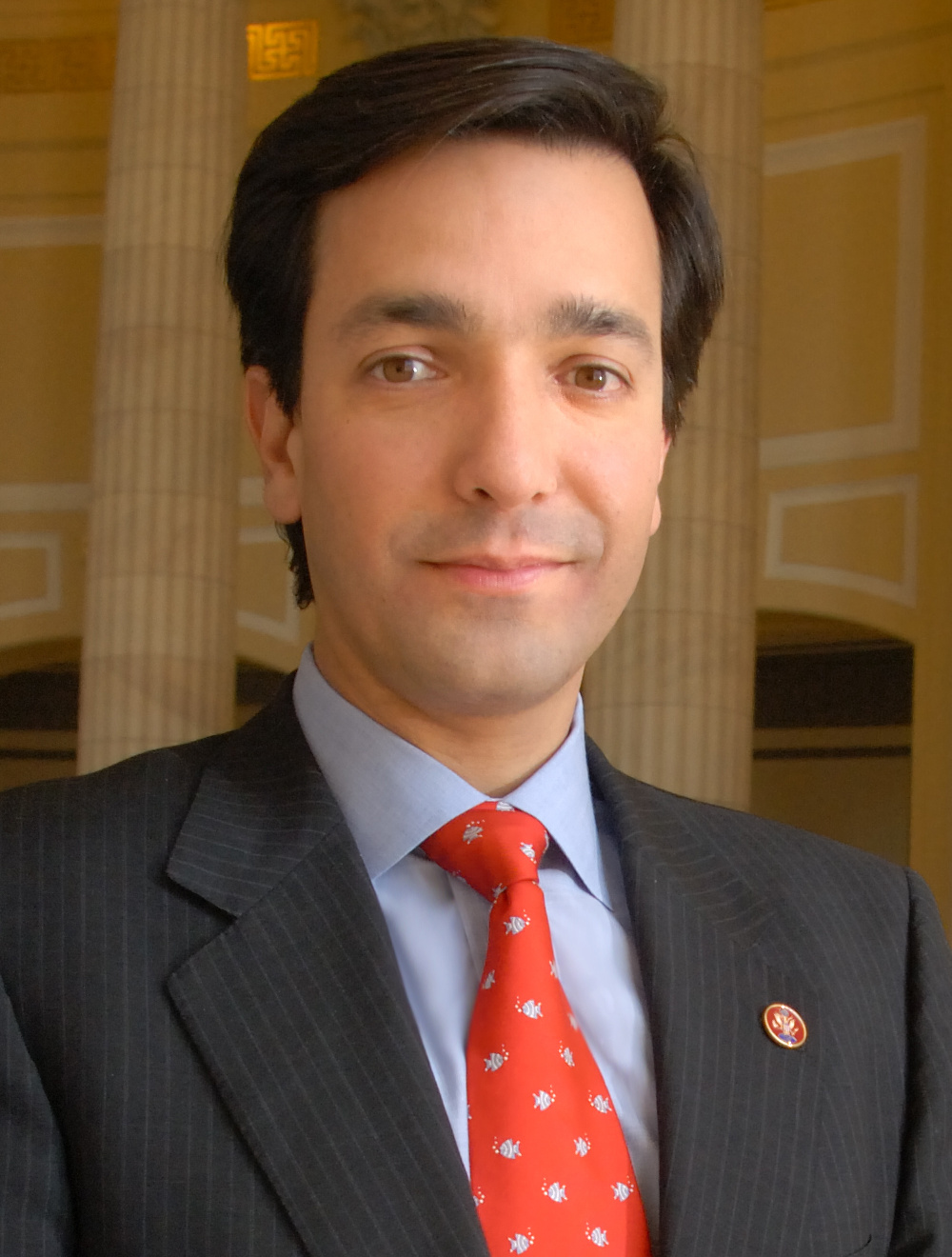

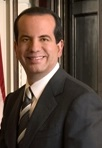
Nominee	Luis Fortuño	Aníbal Acevedo Vilá
Party	New Progressive	Popular Democratic
Popular vote	1,025,965	801,071
Percentage	53.06%	41.43%
- Results by municipality Fortuño: 40–50% 50–60% 60–70% Acevedo Vilá: 40–50%
Governor before election
Aníbal Acevedo Vilá
Popular Democratic
Elected Governor
Luis Fortuño
New Progressive
- Resident Commissioner election
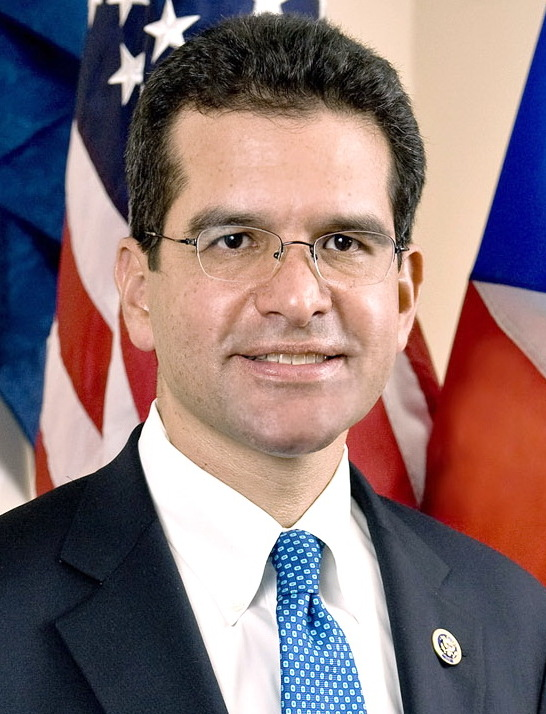

Nominee	Pedro Pierluisi	Alfredo Salazar Jr.
Party	New Progressive	Popular Democratic
Popular vote	1,010,304	810,111
Percentage	52.95%	42.46%
- Results by municipality Pierluisi: 40–50% 50–60% 60–70% Salazar Jr.: 40–50% 50–60%

General elections were held in Puerto Rico on Tuesday, November 4, 2008, to elect the officials of the government that would serve for the next four years, most notably the Governor of Puerto Rico.

The gubernatorial election was won by incumbent Resident Commissioner Luis Fortuño of the New Progressive Party (PNP), who defeated incumbent governor Aníbal Acevedo Vilá of the Popular Democratic Party (PPD) by 53% to 41%. Most other positions were won by PNP candidates, with Pedro Pierluisi winning the election for Resident Commissioner, and the party winning a majority of seats in the Senate and the House of Representatives.

The elections occurred after one term of what was called "shared government", as a result of the 2004 elections. Because of this, the island had a Governor from one party (Acevedo Vilá), while the opposing party held a majority in the Senate and the House of Representatives. The struggles faced by the opposing parties attempts at cooperation, mixed with the global economic crisis, paved the campaign for this elections. Also, Acevedo Vilá was facing criminal accusations at the time.

Fortuño was sworn in as Governor of Puerto Rico on January 2, 2009.

== Background ==
The 2008 Puerto Rican election was historic because:

- It was the first time in more than 20 years that a new party (PPR) joined the three traditional parties in the election.
- It was the first time in Puerto Rican political history that one of the candidates (Aníbal Acevedo Vilá) faced federal criminal charges.
- Supporters of former Governor Pedro Rosselló organized to promote a write-in campaign on his behalf after he lost the party primary against Luis Fortuño.

== Candidates ==
Before the election year, the Constitution of Puerto Rico provides for any qualified person to present their candidacy for a specific position. If two or more candidates from the same party present their candidacy for the same position, and they can't reach an agreement within the party, a primary election is held. This election is held within the inscribed members of each party, to select which of the candidates will represent the party in the general election.

Both of the main parties: New Progressive Party (PNP) and Popular Democratic Party (PPD), held primaries for several positions on March 9, 2008. The PNP primary was more notable for having two candidates for the position of Governor of Puerto Rico.

=== Governor ===
==== Popular Democratic Party ====
Incumbent Aníbal Acevedo Vilá (PPD/D) decided to run for a second four-year term. He faced a tough reelection campaign due to an indictment in March 2008 for alleged conspiracy to illegally raise money to pay off his campaign debts in 2000 and the fallout from the 2006 Puerto Rico budget crisis.

==== New Progressive Party ====
On February 19, 2007, incumbent resident commissioner of Puerto Rico Luis Fortuño announced his candidacy for Governor of Puerto Rico for the 2008 general election and said he will not run for Congress. On May 18, 2007, Fortuño announced that former attorney general Pedro Pierluisi would be his running mate and run for Fortuño's current office of Resident Commissioner of Puerto Rico. Pierluisi Urrutia was a classmate at Colegio Marista, a fellow member of the Puerto Rico Statehood Students Association and also a fellow cabinet member of Fortuño's during former governor Pedro Rosselló's first term from 1993 to 1996. On March 7, 2007, former Governor Pedro Rosselló stated that he was no longer interested in the Senate Presidency and is now focusing his attention in preventing Resident Commissioner Luis Fortuño from winning the March 2008 gubernatorial primary, and has allowed his name to be placed in nomination for the party's gubernatorial primary. Senate President Kenneth McClintock and four other senators won in San Juan Superior Court a suit to nullify the sanctions and expulsions that the party leadership has levied against them. The Puerto Rico Supreme Court confirmed the lower court decision by a 5-to-1 vote. As a result, McClintock and his supporters are recognized as NPP members and free to run under the party banner. On March 9, 2008, Pedro Rosselló conceded the victory to Luis Fortuño after a large margin of votes in favor of his opponent in the NPP party primaries for the presidency of the party and gubernatorial nomination. Rosselló admitted defeat even before the votes were completely tallied claiming Fortuño as the next candidate of the PNP party. In Rosselló's conceding speech he said "Luis Fortuño has been selected by the people to be the new president of this party and the candidate for governor. I always say the people speak and I obey, Fortuño here is your party and here is your office (signaling the party's official headquarters). Now its up to you, the loyal members of this party, to make sure that this new leadership works for the statehood for Puerto Rico". After this conceding speech it was rumored and even announced at Fortuño's headquarters that the former governor would arrive there along with his loyal supporter and mayor of the capital city of San Juan, Jorge Santini, but after Fortuño's followers waited for hours to see their leaders united neither Rosselló or Santini arrived. After the primary was over it was heavily rumored by many that Rosselló would not be campaigning for Fortuño and that he'd resign as senator to go back to his home in Virginia. On March 10, 2008, Rosselló sent the media a written statement regarding his future in which he confirmed he will be retiring from active politics and will not be campaigning for any candidate, however he will finish his term as Senator for the Arecibo District.

==== Puerto Ricans For Puerto Rico Party ====
This Party was a newcomer to the political scene and put forward Rogelio Figueroa as it candidate for governor. It campaigned as a no status party, similar to the PPD at its start.

==== Puerto Rico Independence Party ====
The party had failed to register in the former 2004 elections. A new face was selected to run, as Edwin Irrizary Mora was the gubernatorial candidate. It campaigned as the "radical" option for voters.

==== Final candidates ====
After the primaries, the official candidates for Governor of Puerto Rico were set. The incumbent governor, Aníbal Acevedo Vilá, Popular Democratic Party (PPD) faced the following candidates for the Governorship:

- Luis Fortuño, Resident Commissioner of Puerto Rico, New Progressive Party (PNP)
- Edwin Irizarry Mora, Puerto Rican Independence Party (PIP)
- Rogelio Figueroa, Puerto Ricans for Puerto Rico Party (PPPR)

=== Resident Commissioner ===
The incumbent one-term Resident Commissioner (same as non-voting territorial delegate) Luis Fortuño, of the (NPP/R), was retiring from his House seat to run for Governor of Puerto Rico.

Pedro Pierluisi (NPP), the former Puerto Rican Secretary of Justice under former Governor Pedro Rosselló, was the favorite to succeed Fortuño over economist Alfredo Salazar (PDP).

Regardless of which of the two men won, the seat would switch from Republican to Democratic hands in January as both candidates would caucuses with the Democrats. However, this seat would not have impacted which party controls the chamber.

==== Final candidates ====
- Pedro Pierluisi, New Progressive Party (PNP)
- Jessica Martínez Birriel, Puerto Rican Independence Party (PIP)
- Alfredo Salazar Jr., Popular Democratic Party (PPD)
- Carlos Alberto Velazquez Lopez, Puerto Ricans for Puerto Rico Party (PPR)

== Results ==
=== Governor ===
Candidate	Party	Votes	%
Luis Fortuño	New Progressive Party	1,025,965	53.06
Aníbal Acevedo Vilá	Popular Democratic Party	801,071	41.43
Rogelio Figueroa	Puerto Ricans for Puerto Rico Party	53,693	2.78
Edwin Irizarry Mora	Puerto Rican Independence Party	39,590	2.05
Write-ins		13,215	0.68
Total		1,933,534	100.00
Valid votes		1,933,534	99.58
Invalid votes		4,888	0.25
Blank votes		3,282	0.17
Total votes		1,941,704	100.00
Registered voters/turnout		2,458,036	78.99
Source: Puerto Rico Election Archive

=== Resident Commissioner ===
Candidate	Party	Votes	%
Pedro Pierluisi	New Progressive Party	1,010,304	52.95
Alfredo Salazar Jr.	Popular Democratic Party	810,111	42.46
Carlos Alberto Velázquez	Puerto Ricans for Puerto Rico Party	46,126	2.42
Jessica Martínez Birriel	Puerto Rican Independence Party	37,865	1.98
Write-ins		3,719	0.19
Total		1,908,125	100.00
Valid votes		1,908,125	99.57
Invalid votes		4,888	0.26
Blank votes		3,282	0.17
Total votes		1,916,295	100.00
Registered voters/turnout		2,458,036	77.96
Source: Puerto Rico Election Archive

=== Senate ===
Party	At-large			District			Total seats
Party	Votes	%	Seats	Votes	%	Seats	Total seats
New Progressive Party	886,196	48.12	6	1,887,968	51.20	16	22
Popular Democratic Party	803,415	43.63	9	1,632,545	44.28	0	9
Puerto Rican Independence Party	90,171	4.90	0	80,920	2.19	0	0
Puerto Ricans for Puerto Rico Party	38,103	2.07	0	84,437	2.29	0	0
Other parties	412	0.02	0	1,224	0.03	0	0
Independents	23,158	1.26	0				0
Total	1,841,455	100.00	15	3,687,094	100.00	16	31
Valid votes	1,841,455	98.95					
Invalid votes	8,428	0.45					
Blank votes	11,055	0.59					
Total votes	1,860,938	100.00					
Registered voters/turnout	2,458,036	75.71					
Source: Puerto Rico Election Archive

=== House of Representatives ===
Party	At-large			District			Total seats
Party	Votes	%	Seats	Votes	%	Seats	Total seats
New Progressive Party	913,037	49.28	6	959,644	51.37	31	37
Popular Democratic Party	802,779	43.33	8	826,878	44.26	9	17
Puerto Rican Independence Party	93,816	5.06	0	40,269	2.16	0	0
Puerto Ricans for Puerto Rico Party	42,709	2.31	0	38,393	2.06	0	0
Other parties	500	0.03	0	1,732	0.09	0	0
Independents				1,148	0.06	0	0
Total	1,852,841	100.00	14	1,868,064	100.00	40	54
Valid votes	1,852,841	98.96					
Invalid votes	8,428	0.45					
Blank votes	11,055	0.59					
Total votes	1,872,324	100.00					
Registered voters/turnout	2,458,036	76.17					
Source: Puerto Rico Election Archive

=== Mayors ===
Party	Mayoralties
New Progressive Party	48
Popular Democratic Party	30
Puerto Rican Independence Party	0
Puerto Ricans for Puerto Rico Party	0
Total	78
