= Dave Spence =

American corporate executive and politician

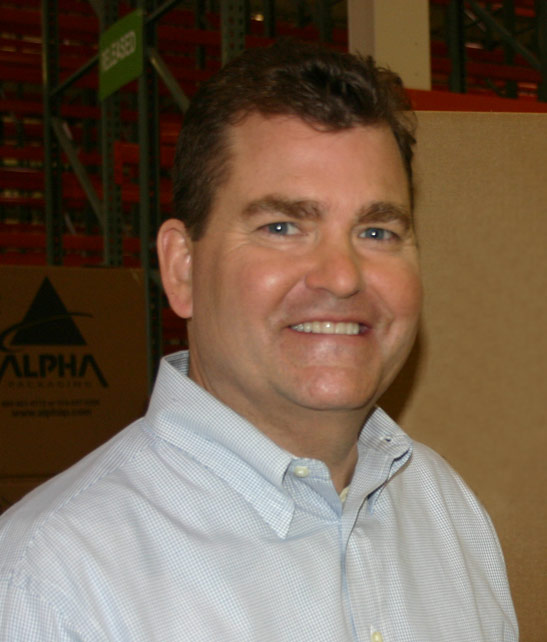

Personal details
- Born: February 28, 1958 (age 68) Overland, Missouri, U.S.
- Party: Republican
- Spouse: Suzie Spence (1990–present)
- Children: 4
- Education: University of Missouri, Columbia (BA)

Dave Spence (born February 28, 1958) is an American corporate executive and politician. He was the Republican nominee for governor of Missouri in the 2012 election, losing the general election to incumbent Democrat Jay Nixon.

== Early life and career ==
Spence was born in Overland in St. Louis County, Missouri. He spent much of his childhood in the St. Louis area with his mother and two sisters. Following graduation from Kirkwood High School,

Spence earned a degree in Home Economics from the University of Missouri in Columbia.

In 1985, the 26-year-old Spence purchased Alpha Packaging, a small plastics firm. Under his ownership it expanded from 15 to 800 employees. Spence has a family background in the plastics industry. His father had started a rubber and plastics business, for which Spence worked as a teen. However, the business failed in the early 1980s.

Spence has also served as chairman of Legacy Pharmaceutical Packaging.

Spence and wife, Suzie, married in 1990 and are the parents of four children.

== Political career ==
In November 2011, Spence announced his intention to run for governor of Missouri regardless of whether Missouri Lieutenant Governor Peter Kinder decided to run. Kinder decided to run for reelection as lieutenant governor, and endorsed Spence for governor.

Spence, who had never held elected office before, said: "Well one thing I would do is bring a fresh approach to everything. I am willing to jump in there and work my tail off, and I think it can be done. It's a good point in my life and I feel the urgency to do something, and I can't sleep at night knowing that I can make a difference and rally the troops and get the state turned around if I had the opportunity and said no."

Spence's campaign website asserted that he held a degree in economics, a statement also made on at least one campaign flier, which also incorrectly stated that he had gone to the university's business school. His degree is actually in home economics. After the inaccuracy was revealed and publicly criticized in January 2012, he corrected his website. Regarding the errors, Spence told the Associated Press, "I have said all along that I will not or do not lie ... A lot of this is overblown, as I was not aware of any place that said business school ... I will take responsibility for this. I did not catch the mistake on early campaign literature." Spence's campaign manager cited a staff oversight for the error.

On August 7, 2012, Spence won the Republican nomination for Missouri governor. He received 333,578 votes (59.9 percent) to outpace nearest challenger Bill Randles' 90,651 (16.3 percent). Spence was defeated by incumbent Democrat Jay Nixon in the November 2012 general election.

In his contest against Nixon, Spence had the support of Phyllis Schlafly's Eagle Forum political action committee.

Party political offices
Preceded by Kenny Hulshof	Republican nominee for Governor of Missouri; 2012	Succeeded by Eric Greitens
