= Rogelio Figueroa =

Puerto Rican politician

- Born: Rogelio Figueroa García; September 13, 1963 (age 61); Naguabo, Puerto Rico
- Occupation(s): Engineer, politician

Rogelio Figueroa García (born September 13, 1963 in Naguabo, Puerto Rico) is a Puerto Rican engineer and politician. He is the president and co-founder of the Puerto Ricans for Puerto Rico (PPR) party, and served as their gubernatorial candidate for the 2008 general elections. He was also the gubernatorial candidate for the 2012 general elections.

== Early life and studies ==
Rogelio Figueroa García was born on the Municipal Hospital of Naguabo, Puerto Rico and raised near by in the community of Parcelas Aguas Claras in Ceiba. He is the youngest of nine children of farmer Sotero Figueroa Pomales and housewife Juanita García Noble.

Figueroa began his studies in Ceiba, and continued in Naguabo. He attended the Rafael Rocca High School in that town, graduating in 1981. In 1986 he graduated magna cum laude with a Bachelor of Chemical Engineering at the University of Puerto Rico at Mayagüez. In 1988 he obtained his Masters in Chemical Engineering from Ohio State University.

== Professional career ==
Figueroa has worked in the manufacturing and pharmaceutical industry from 1988 to 1995. He has worked in the design and improvement of industrial systems and processes. He has also worked as an entrepreneur of industrial technical services, documentation and information systems for the pharmaceutical and biotechnologic industry. He is also an entrepreneur in the construction of green buildings, the development of alternatives of renewable energy and the handling of solid waste for the production of energy.

Figueroa has worked with community organizations as an adviser in environmental issues, and has worked in projects as the dredging of Carraízo and the Route 66, among others.

== Political career ==
Figueroa founded the Puerto Ricans for Puerto Rico Party (PPR). He participated in the 2004 general elections as a write-in gubernatorial candidate.

In May 2007, the party was officially inscribed for the 2008 general elections. Figueroa received a total of 53,693 votes (2.77%), finishing third among the four gubernatorial candidates.

Figueroa ran as a gubernatorial candidate for the 2012 general elections.
