= 1994 Puerto Rican constitutional referendum =

Ballot measure in Puerto Rico

A constitutional referendum was held in Puerto Rico on 6 November 1994. Voters were asked whether they approved of two amendments, one to eliminate the absolute right to bail and the other to increase the number of Supreme Court judges. Both were rejected by 54% of voters, with a turnout of 62.2%.

== Results ==
=== Eliminating the absolute right to bail ===
Choice	Votes	%
For	605,866	45.6
Against	712,291	53.6
Invalid/blank votes	11,907	–
Total	1,330,055	100
Source: Nohlen

=== Increasing the number of Supreme Court judges ===
Choice	Votes	%
For	595,425	44.8
Against	718,373	54.0
Invalid/blank votes	16,257	–
Total	1,330,055	100
Source: Nohlen
