= Movimiento Unión Soberanista =

Puerto Rican political party

Sovereign Union Movement Movimiento Unión Soberanista
- President: María de Lourdes Guzmán
- Vice-President: Arturo Hernández
- Vice-President: Rosa N. Bell Bayron
- Founded: October 2010; 14 years ago
- Dissolved: 2012; 13 years ago
- Merged into: Movimiento Victoria Ciudadana
- Headquarters: San Juan, Puerto Rico
- Ideology: Sovereignty for Puerto Rico
- Political position: Center-left
- Colors: Teal

Website
- www.muspr.org

Movimiento Unión Soberanista (MUS) (English: Sovereign Union Movement) was a Puerto Rican political party. The party was founded in October 2010 in the city of Caguas, Puerto Rico.

== Certification ==
On March 20, 2012, the Puerto Rico State Commission on Elections (CEE) certified the MUS as a registered party after obtaining the 60,000 endorsements required by Puerto Rican Electoral law.

== Election results ==
The MUS was a small third party. Its candidate for Governor of Puerto Rico, lawyer Arturo Hernández, came in fifth place in the 2012 elections with 0.56% of the vote; María de Lourdes Guzmán, the MUS's candidate for Resident Commissioner, also finished fifth with 0.62% of the vote. The MUS failed to win any seats in the Puerto Rican Senate or House. Also, since the party did not receive 3% of the vote in 2012 to remain as a certified party, it was de facto dissolved.
