= Puerto Ricans for Puerto Rico Party =

Political party in Puerto Rico

Puerto Ricans for Puerto Rico Party PPR - Partido Puertorriqueños por Puerto Rico
- President: Rogelio Figueroa
- Founded: 2003
- Headquarters: Santurce, San Juan
- Ideology: Green politics
- Political position: Center-left
- Colors: Orange and White

Website
- www.porpuertorico.com

The Puerto Ricans for Puerto Rico Party (Spanish: Partido Puertorriqueños por Puerto Rico, PPR) was a Puerto Rican political party. Founded in 2003, it was certified for the first time by the State Electoral Commission in May 2007.

== History ==
In April 2007, it submitted the signatures required for certification by the State Electoral Commission. Rogelio Figueroa is the president and co-founder of the party.

The party finally got its certification on Wednesday, May 9, 2007, when the president of the Electoral Commission gave his approval. During this process, two of the three commissioners of the currently registered political parties supported the PPR's certification. Puerto Rican electoral law states that, if the commissioners don't reach a unanimous decision, the president of the Electoral Commission decides whether the party gets registered.

=== 2008 election ===
The party had an ambitious agenda, attempting to run for nearly all elected positions, including governor, resident commissioner, and both state legislative houses (Senate and House of Representatives).

On the 2008 elections, the PPR candidate Rogelio Figueroa obtained 2.77% of the votes. Since electoral law requires over 3% of votes to maintain the party charter, this result meant that the party would be decertified, until they completed the certification process for the next elections. Still, the party obtained more votes than the lead minority party, the Puerto Rican Independence Party, which has been running since 1946.

=== The aftermath ===
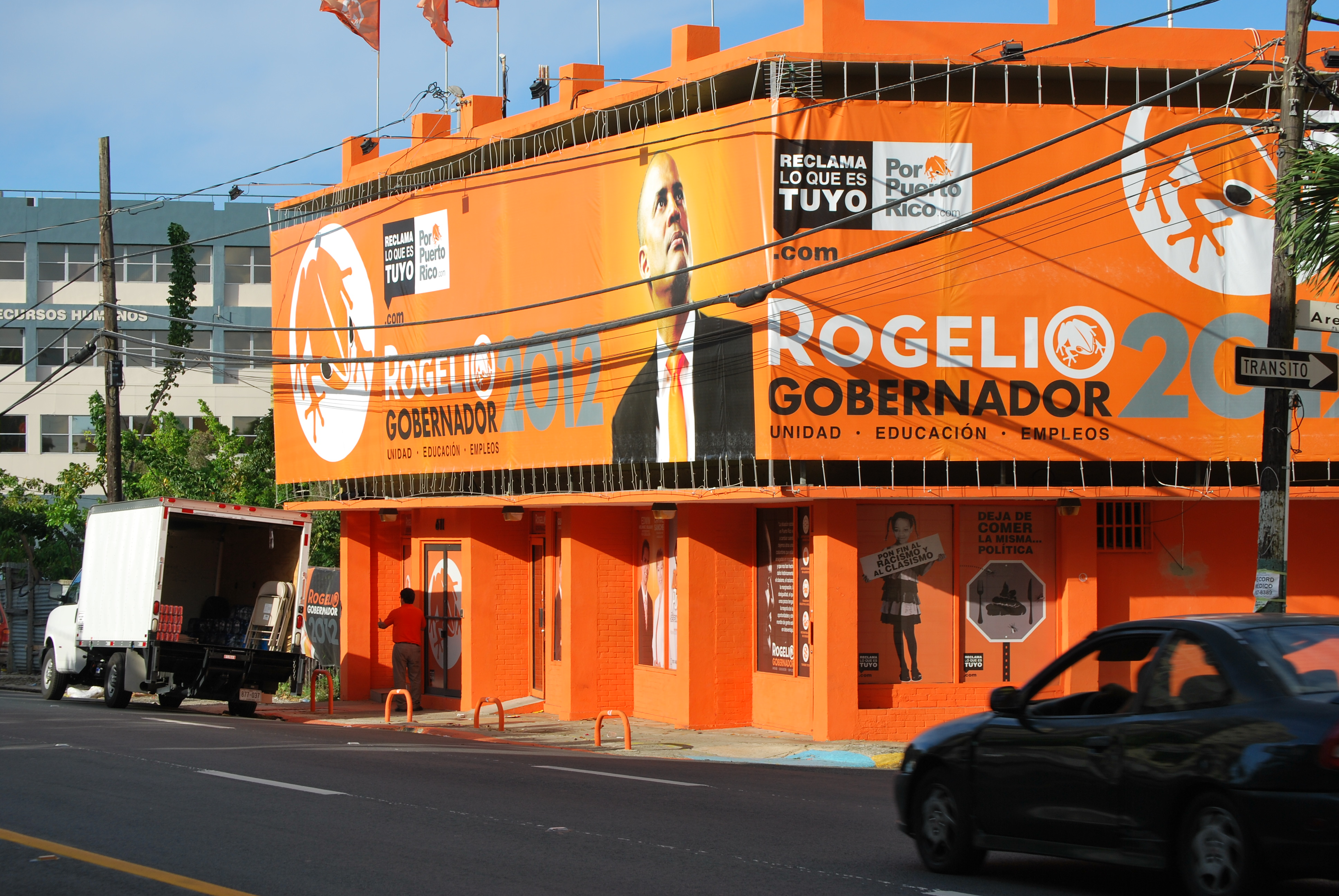
Party headquarters in 2012

After the loss the party experienced internal struggles and dissent with many party officials and candidates breaking away from the party. Nevertheless, the party continues to operate as an independent entity and it is seeking to regain its Electoral Commission certification.

=== 2012 election ===
For the 2012 elections, the party underwent a reorganization. After completing the certification process, they presented their candidacies. Figueroa would run again for governor, while Dr. Sadiasept Guillont would run for Resident Commissioner. During his campaign, Figueroa attacked the alleged classism and social inequality of the current government. After failing to get the required 3% of the vote in 2012 to remain a certified party, the party was de facto dissolved.

== Platform ==
The PPR was originally organized as an ecological party, similar to green parties in Europe. It later broadened its platform and ideology to include economic issues, the political status of Puerto Rico, and citizen participation in government.

The position that PPR has taken on the issue of the political status of Puerto Rico has been a non-traditional one in Puerto Rican politics. The PPR's position is a neutral one. The party has not and will not take a side on the issue of Puerto Rico's status. In fact, candidates and officials of PPR are actually people with diverse opinions on what the future status of Puerto Rico should be. PPR has managed to enlist in one same party followers of Statehood, Independence, and Commonwealth. The party's stance is that the issue of the status of Puerto Rico should be discussed after bigger problems that affect Puerto Ricans' daily life are resolved.

== See also ==
- List of political parties in Puerto Rico
- Politics of Puerto Rico
