= Timeline of sovereigntism in Puerto Rico (2000s–2010s) =

During the first two decades of the 21st Century, the concept of a sovereign form of association has experienced its largest growth since it was first proposed. The 2000s marked the first time that an incumbent governor ran on a platform advocating sovereignty, when Aníbal Acevedo Vilá did so for the Popular Democratic Party (PPD). The term soberanista was popularized as a consequence, and the ideological breach within the party widened as the conservative wing backed the territorial Commonwealth. During the 2010s, free association recorded its best performance at the polls, finishing as runner-up of the 2012 status referendum. This decade also marked the first time that another party presented supporters of free association in the ballot, with the participation of the Movimiento Unión Soberanista (MUS).

== Within the PPD ==
=== Acevedo Vilá, Miranda Marín and the ELA Soberano ===
The perceived inaction of governor Sila Calderón in regards to the political status produced the reaction of several liberal figures within the Popular Democratic Party (PPD), most notably Cordero Santiago. In 2002, José Trías Monge participated in the presentation of a book titled "Crónica de una Guerra Anunciada" authored by Néstor Duprey, where he expressed that there was no perceivable difference between free association as defined by the UN and the culmination of the Commonwealth as envisioned by Fernós.

On May 13, 2002, in expressions directed to president George W. Bush Cordero Santiago stated that "Puerto Rico is a colony of the United States of America and a self-sufficient model can't be developed due to limitations imposed by the executive branch and Congress". At the 50th Anniversary of the Constitution, Miranda Marín insisted that "the goal should be to fight in order to obtain the maximum level of sovereignty possible with double citizenship until we can reach the evolution of our status on that of a Sovereign Associated State in line with the relationship of the countries in the European community". After being jailed for participating in the widespread protests against the presence of the United States Navy in Vieques, Cordero Santiago began organizing a series multi-sectorial reunions with hopes of organizing a new status project based on his belief in free association. However, this was never materialized due to his sudden death on January 17, 2004. Despite being a member of Calderón's cabinet, Acevedo Víla would publicly point out any discrepancy that he perceived with the government's official version, causing a direct confrontation between both. Calderón ultimately supported Hernández Mayoral as the next candidate for the position of governor. Despite this support, Hernández Mayoral abandoned the candidature and former governor Pedro Roselló became the PNP's candidate. Acevedo Víla became the PPD's official candidate, choosing conservative Roberto Pratts as his candidate for Resident Commissioner. This was a strategy to diminish the differences between both wings, portraying a common goal.

In October 2003, after regaining the presidency of the PPD, Acevedo Vilá reaffirmed his expressions of 1998 and within a year, the organization of a Constituent Assembly to attend the status of Puerto Rico became part of the party's 2004 Program for Government. The PPD's government program once again supported the non-territorial development of the Commonwealth. In the 2004 general elections, Acevedo Víla defeated Roselló, while Pratts lost to Luis Fortuño. In 2005, Acevedo Vilá presented a status bill that would attend the issue and subsequently pursue a Constituent Assembly if the people of Puerto Rico supported a new process. However, after the PNP delegation replaced it with a substitutive proposal that established the Constituent Assembly as only "a possibility", the governor vetoed the project citing that "the [PNP was] trying to fool the country". George W. Bush's administration released a task force report in December 2005. The document was controversial among both factions of the PPD, first because it directly declared that the sovereignty of Puerto Rico lied exclusively in Congress and that any further development within the territorial clause was implausible and secondly, because it listed free association as a variant of independence, despite it being listed separately in the UN's General Assembly Resolution 1514. However, the report does differentiate free association from independence in practice, declaring that both the retention of the United States Citizenship and of free access (travel between countries without the need of a visa) between parts could be negotiated as part of the compact. The inform concludes that among the "constitutionally viable" options, it represents the one closest to the historical "perfected Commonwealth".

Amidst the controversy that followed, the PPD's vice president and president of the PPD Mayors Association, José Aponte de la Torre, noted that the party's ideology should be redefined and reaffirmed his belief in free association. Following the release of the Bush administration's status Task Force, the PPD's Government Board approved a document reaffirming its support for a "dignified association" that was based on the sovereignty of Puerto Rico. Acevedo Vilá assigned Carlos Dalmau Ramírez as his representative before the UN's Decolonization Committee, delivering a speech where he asked for cooperation from the UN's General Assembly in pursuing an exercise of free determination and support for a "non colonial, non territorial" form of association. The governor's statement noted that "like the rest of our people, the [PPD] rejects all forms of colonialism", "[now] more than fifty years after the adoption of the Commonwealth, it is evident that the issue of Puerto Rico's status was not resolved in 1952", also arguing the need for a move towards a "sovereign, association [that included] joint responsibility with the United States". On July 16, 2006, the PPD's General Assembly adopted Resolution No. AG2006-01 which established that any citizen interested in running under its insignia, should compromise with the need to "attend the status issue with out dilation" and support the organization of the Constituent Assembly towards that goal. On July 29, 2007, the PPD's General Assembly adopted Resolution No. AG2007-04, in support of Acevedo Vilá's proposal to raise the issue of Puerto Rico's status to the General Assembly of the UN. Resolution No. AG2007-05 was also approved and it established that the sovereignty of Puerto Rico was "irrevocable" and the cornerstone "of a non-colonial, non-territorial association relationship in accordance to international law".

On April 27, 2008, an Extraordinary Assembly was organized where Acevedo Vilá vividly argued the need for a sovereign development of the Commonwealth in association with the United States. The proposal also established that the specifics of the future association would include the considerations of people beyond the PPD and ordered the party's president to present their demands before the UN. PR Rep. Charlie Hernández presented a resolution that reaffirmed the pro-sovereignty posture of the "non colonial, non territorial" development of the status as proposed in 1998, Programs for Government of 2000 and 2004, the similar resolutions approved in 2006-07 and the Enmienda Vizcarrondo (formerly known as General Council Resolution of November 17, 1990). On May 15, 2008, the PPD's Status Commission adopted the party's Program of Government for the 2008 general elections, which was the first document to introduce the label Estado Libre Asociado Soberano when referring to free association. This Commission was presided by Acevedo Vilá and its executive director was Charlie Hernández. Other members included PR Representatives Luis Vega Ramos and Héctor Ferrer, PR Senators Antonio Fas Alzamora and José Luis Dalmau, as well as non-elected figures Roberto Prats and Hernández Colón's eldest son, José Alfredo Hernández Mayoral. None of which openly rejected the pro-sovereignty language during the drafting process. The proposal was prepared by Miranda Marín and established a timeline that went from the Pronunciamiento de Aguas Buenas to a deliberation supporting the non-territorial and sovereign development that first took place on October 15, 1998, and had been approved in seven consecutive General Assemblies. Afterwards Miranda Marín brought the pro-sovereignty proposal before the Program Assembly, responsible for approving the party's proposal prior to the general elections, where it was approved unanimously.

=== Soberanistas vs. Hernández Mayoral & Ferrer ===
Following Acevedo Vilá's loss, Hernández Colón began pursuing control of the PPD's leadership by supporting conservative candidates for the party's leadership positions. His candidates revived the proposal of a territorial development of the Commonwealth, also recycling the term "permanent union" when referring to this proposal. This shattered the ties that the party had created with other movements and factions, particularly the more liberal ones. With the conservative wing regaining control of the Government Board, Héctor Ferrer, who has publicly expressed his aversion towards free association, was selected as the party's president. The new president designated José Alfredo Hernández Mayoral to the position of Secretary of International and Federal Affairs, which established Hernández Colón's position as the leadership's official status stance. However, this time the conservative leadership decided to adopt the term autonomistas, a vague name that means "autonomy-supporter" and had been frequently used to differentiate the soberanistas, to describe their faction while claiming that they believed in the "maximum autonomous development of the commonwealth within the territorial clause", but did not believe in retaining the sovereignty of Puerto Rico, instead equating it to independence. While conservatives led by PR Sen. Alejandro García Padilla placed the blame of the loss on the pro-sovereignty discourse, others noted that representatives Carmen Yulín Cruz, Charlie Hernández, Luis Vega Ramos and Luis Raúl Torres, as well as senators Antonio Fas Alzamora and Cirilo Tirado were directly elected, while conservatives such as Colberg Toro entered as a product of the Minority Law to the PR House. (Note: This law grants additional representation to electoral minorities if a majority party wins more than two thirds of the seats in the legislature.)

A tug war ensued between both factions, where Miranda Marín warned that if the PPD resisted the change implied by free association, it would become irrelevant as a political force during the 21st century.

Parallel to the internal struggle in the PPD, a group of non-affiliated civilians founded Alianza pro Libre Asociación Soberana (lit. "Alliance for Sovereignty in Free Association") intending to independently defend the free association option. The inclusion of a "Sovereignty in association with the United States" option in Resident Commissioner Pedro Pierluisi's H.R. 2499 (known as the Puerto Rico Democracy Act) ignited these differences, after receiving the cautious support of some within the free association movement and the outright opposition of the conservative leadership. On March 24, 2009, a group of representatives and mayors led by Luis Vega Ramos, Luis Raúl Torres, Carlos "Charlie" Hernández, Carmen Yulín Cruz, Víctor Vasallo, Martín Vargas and Pedro Garcia, issued a press release listing the evolution of the free association movement within the PPD. On May 26, 2009, José Alfredo Hernández Mayoral published an article where he labeled the soberanistas as "independence supporters" and claimed that sovereignty "endangers the American Citizenship". Immediately, the three members of the free association movement within the International and Federal Affairs Office, Charlie Hernández, Vega Ramos and Nestor Duprey, sent a letter to Ferrer noting that the 2008 Program of Government remained the ideological position of the PPD and requested a clarification that the expressions of Hernández Mayoral were to be interpreted as personal opinion and not as an official representation of the party's stance due to his position as the secretary.

Ferrer shied away from the controversy, instead insisting his interest that the issue was "discussed" and noted that he had reached an agreement with Miranda Marín so that the status issue could be internally debated in forums with representations from the eight Districts. However, the representative who was tentatively appointed to lead these forums, Jorge Colberg Toro, abandoned his previous defense of free association and sided with Hernández Mayoral, criticizing the soberanistas and also requesting to be released from this commitment. García Padilla quickly joined them, reaffirming his conservative stance and saying that the PPD "is not an independence party". Miranda Marín responded by telling Hernández Mayoral that if his intention was to make imprudent generalization, then he should keep quiet. Ferrer responded to this by defending Hernández Mayoral. Fas Alzamora emerged during the crossfire and suggested that the matter was attended internally, but not before telling Ferrer that the divisive expressions of Hernández Mayoral were akin to the statehood movement and that if they were allowed to continue, this would inevitably end in a division that would be the "coup de grace for the PPD". Ferrer responded by trying to avoid the matter, simply saying that "everybody has the right of an opinion, but everybody has the responsibility to listen". Shortly afterwards, the conservative wing created a group that they baptized as Fuerza nueva popular (lit. "New popular force") which was preeminently composed by Ferrer, Hernández Mayoral, García Padilla and Roberto Prats.

The ongoing controversy and the PPD status posture motivated the actions of civil organizations that supported free association. Members of ALAS visited a session of the European Parliament in Brussels following arrangements made by Miguel Norbert Ubarri, who worked as a professor in the adjacent municipality of Antwerp. This was the first step of an internationalization agenda, where the group attempted to promote the existence free association movement before several international organizations. Their next target was the UN's Special Committee on Decolonization. Concurrently, the Proyecto de Alianza e Impacto Soberanista (lit. "Project for Pro-Sovereignty Alliance and Impact") was created to serve an educational organization and develop its own free association model. Presided by Alfredo Carrasquillo, the group had a membership of over 100 figures including the notable participation of Miranda Marín. Within the Universities, there was also the appearance of new student-run organizations that support free association, such as the Asociación de Estudiantes Puertorriqueños por un ELA Soberano (lit."Association of Puerto Rican Students for a ELA Soberano") presided by Adrian Brito. On May 30, 2009, a nonpartisan educational organization named Instituto Soberanista Puertorriqueño (lit. "Puerto Rican Pro-Sovereignty Institute") was founded under the leadership of former PPD-affiliate Ángel Collado Schwarz, congregating members from the free association and independence movement.

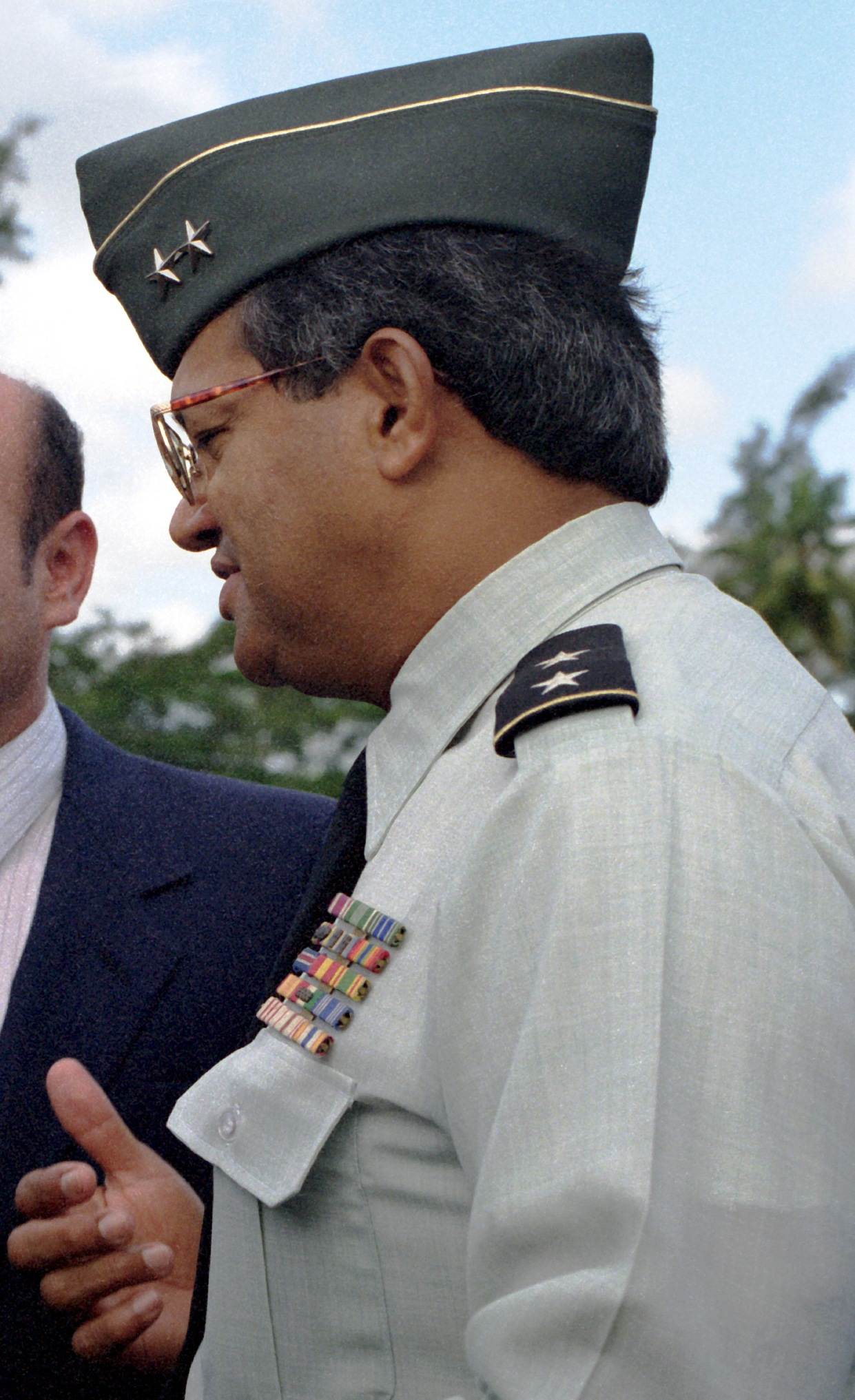
William Miranda Marín

The PNP quickly exploited these conflicts, with Fortuño intervening and telling the PPD to define itself, and also claiming that the definition of "Sovereignty in association with the United States" present in H.R. 2499 was taken from the 2008 Program of Government. However, Acevedo Vilá intervened by sending a letter to the president of the US House of Representatives, Nancy Pelosi, claiming that the definition was actually based on the Bush's task force report of 2005, and strongly opposing H.R. 2499 by saying that it "is unfairly structured to produce an artificial majority for making Puerto Rico the 51st state of the Union". He concluded by reaffirming his support for the development of the "Commonwealth status based on the sovereignty of the People of Puerto Rico to sustain the relationship, not simply a mere continuation of the current Commonwealth." These arguments were celebrated by Charlie Hernández, Luis Vega Ramos, Carmen Yulín and Cirilo Tirado, who received with satisfaction the public expressions of their former leader amidst the internal status debate. Both Ferrer and Miranda Marín were summoned before the House Committee on Natural Resources, where H.R. 2499 was a prominent topic. In an interview, Ferrer explained his posture, claiming that he believed in a "pact of association" but not in a "treaty of association". He explained this contradiction by noting his believe that a "treaty" could only be reached between independent nations. Ferrer, however, expressed his belief that a "pact of association" could remove Puerto Rico out of the Territorial Clause while continuing subjected to the United States Constitution.

Despite claiming that under his leadership the PPD would pursue a "non territorial" form of Commonwealth, he openly disregarded the notion of national sovereignty and claimed that he supported "popular sovereignty", a term usually applied to the right to vote. Ferrer explained that under his "enhanced Commonwealth", Puerto Rico would only have a local level of sovereignty similar to the American states and would not possess international jurisdiction. He responded further questions by mentioning his opposition towards an "associated republic". The ambiguity of these answers was noted by the journalist that published the interview. The following day, Ferrer once again quoted his proposal for a "pact of association" and tried to qualm the controversy by saying that "[they] should work towards a consensus" and that "everybody fits within the PPD" during a reunion of the General Council. Charlie Hernández, Luis Vega Ramos, Carmen Yulín, Cirilo Tirado and Néstor Duprey attended the meeting. However, Alfredo Hernández Mayoral was the first to dismiss the possibility that this meant a definitive ceasefire. Maintaining the stance adopted before, Ferrer attended a hearing in the UN Committee on Decolonization, where he openly rejected free association and debated the development of the Commonwealth beyond the three options listed in general assembly resolution 1514 (independence, integration or association) citing a single sentence of General Assembly Resolution 2625 which states the possibility of the "emergence into any other political status freely determined by a people", which he felt would allow further development within the territorial clause.

His argument was criticized as an oxymoron, since it intended to exploit a perceived loophole while ignoring the fact that based on International Law, the UN would not accept "fourth options" where one of the sides would remain permanently subdued to the other. During these hearings, Charlie Hernández read a declaration that was also subscribed by Luis Vega Ramos, Carmen Yulín Cruz, Luis Raúl Torres, Víctor Vassallo Anadón and Cirilo Tirado, where he defended free association, blamed the UN for the lack of action regarding the status debate and requested that the case of Puerto Rico was returned to the General Assembly. Afterwards, Hernández Mayoral published another column arguing his belief of an "enhanced commonwealth" within the territorial clause and argued that under free association, the United States citizenship was not guaranteed. Like the previous occasion, this created another rift, which saw Vega Ramos respond by urging a stop to campaigns that promote "unfounded fears". He, along Charlie Hernández and Néstor Duprey, also vacated their seats at the PPD International and Federal Affairs Office. PROELA intervened and its president noted that the Office of the United States Attorney General had released a memorandum in June 2002 (through John Yoo) supporting double citizenship, which in his opinion disabled the arguments of the conservative wing. Concurrently, Ferrer attended a hearing before the United States House Committee on Natural Resources accompanied by members of the conservative wing, once again expressing his refusal to pursue free association. Parallel to this, Acevedo Vilá reaffirmed his pro-sovereignty stance in a letter written to president Barack Obama, where he requested that the administration acted on the status issue.

Prior to the 2009 Anniversary of the Puerto Rican Constitution, several conservative members differed on how to proceed on the status issue. García Padilla argued that the status should not be discussed at all en route to the 2012 General Elections, while Colberg Toro noted that he was working in a manual "to attend the issue" and said that anyone who believed in a different status than the Commonwealth "[was] in the wrong party". The possibility of temporally lowering the profile of the internal rift was supported by some of the soberanistas, but Charlie Hernández argued that there was already a party with no status stance. At the event, Ferrer slowed the conservative discourse that he had been promoting until then, instead offering a "midpoint" between factions, the "New Social Pact", which would include participation in international organizations. The proposal received mixed receptions from the soberanistas, with Vega Ramos considering it a step in the right direction while Charlie Hernández was not entirely convinced. Among mayors, the situation was similar, while Hormigueros mayor Pedro García insisted that it was time to reclaim the sovereignty of Puerto Rico, the mayor of Dorado Carlos López Rivera confirmed his conservative stance and rejected free association. On August 3, 2009, Hernández Mayoral published another article, this time directly labeling the soberanistas as the adversaries that were "destroying the PPD", claiming that while the free association gathered strength in polls published by the conservative Caribbean Business, the territorial Commonwealth lost it, which in his opinion allowed statehood to take hold and caused the 2008 loss.

Like the times before, this exacerbated the internal division within the party. Instead of directly responding the attack, Vega Ramos questioned why Hernández Mayoral was imposing his personal agenda over the collective unity and warned that further attempts to expel them from the party would only destroy it. Charlie Hernández noted that during the exit polls that followed the 2008 General Elections, a majority voted while taking economic considerations as a priority and only a 16% minority did so due to the status issue. The article received a lukewarm response by the conservative wing led by Sila Mari González and García Padilla, but Ferrer distanced from it. This time, Acevedo Vilá emerged to take full responsibility of the 2008 loss and noted that his pro-sovereignty proposal actually had the opposite effect, instead unifying the groups that had been historically divided between the "enhanced" Commonwealth and free association in polls conducted by Peter D. Hart. Still trying to avoid becoming involved, Ferrer requested to "set personal aspirations aside". Miranda Marín published his own article questioning the honesty of Hernández Mayoral's column and contended that the intention was to "defend [justify] his own fears". The following month, it became public that Miranda Marín began organizing a team to run for the governorship of Puerto Rico. He held reunions with several figures of the industrial, environmentalist, artistic and political classes among other, some belonging to ALAS and PAIS. Through a series of associates, Miranda Marín organized a strategic approach that would educate the public of his proposal, a model of free association that was influenced by the European Union. Among the several figures involved, a series of reunions with Acevedo Vilá stood out.

The conservative wing responded by promoting the final draft of Colberg Toro's document. Named Pacto de futuro (lit. "Pact of the future") the draft promoted replacing Public Law 600 with another law which specified their demands to enhance the territorial Commonwealth, but specifically declaring that this did not equate to free association. Hernández Mayoral issued another critical article, but this time it was largely ignored. The free association movement within the PPD suffered a major hit when Miranda Marín was diagnosed with pancreatic cancer. Despite the challenge that this presented, PAIS continued their agenda with a visit to Washington. On October 8, 2009, the US. House Committee on Natural Resources published House Report 111-294, which directly dismissed the possibility of further developing the Commonwealth under the sovereignty of Congress. The document criticized the support given by the conservative wing of the PPD to an enhanced territorial Commonwealth, stating that "this hybrid proposal continues to be promoted in Puerto Rico as a feasible status option. Such proposals have resulted in misinformed and inconclusive referendums in Puerto Rico in July 1967, November 1993 and December 1998." When Hernández Mayoral began demanding for a process that would "clarify" the posture of the PPD on free association, the soberanistas openly expressed that they didn't trust him to lead it from his position of Secretary of International and Federal Affairs. While the status issue took a hiatus while the party opposed H.R. 2499 in Washington, Ramón Luis Nieves published a book that reviewed and answered 75 questions concerning the basics of a development of the Commonwealth based on its sovereignty titled El ELA que queremos, which received the endorsement of the liberal wing.

In December, Hernández Mayoral insisted that the party should establish the conservative posture as an institutional posture. This time, the PPD's Government Board led by Ferrer, issued Resolution JG-2010-003 on a divided vote (opposing votes coming from Luis Raúl Torres, Carmen Yulín and Gil A. Rodríguez), which immediately sparked another controversy. The document was based on Colberg Toro's manual and defines a series of steps to guide how the status issue should be attended insisting on the previous interpretation of UN General Assembly Resolution 2625, and intended to unilaterally revoke the pro-sovereignty posture approved by the General Council by expressing that the PPD "does not believe in the Associated Republic" and disregarding the pre-existent free association compacts of Palau, Micronesia and the Marshall Islands. The mayors of Guánica and Juana Díaz, Martín Vargas Morales and Ramón Hernández Torres were among the first to react, expressing their opposition to what they perceived as a "set back" and a "regrettable decision", noting that if the liberal wing is excluded that would mean a guaranteed loss for the PPD. However, the discerning voices were quick to point out that the Resolution had no real impact unless it was approved by the General Assembly. Hernández Mayoral was satisfied, saying that "[now] the soberanistas should reconsider their stay in the PPD", releasing a column inviting the soberanistas to follow the example of Vicente Géigel Polanco. Carmen Yulín reacted by claiming that the approval of it would be "dangerous" and that it contradicted the will of the General Assembly, an opinion echoed by Vega Ramos, who also labeled it a late "Christmas gift" for the PNP.

Charlie Hernández believed that this development represented a sudden reversal of 50 years of "advances on the subject of the development of the current commonwealth status", a position also supported by Luis Raul Torres. PROELA demanded a clarification from Ferrer's leadership, questioning if the intention of the resolution was make it clear that any future negotiation would be done with the guarantee that Puerto Rico remains as a subordinate of the United States. Fas Alzamora formally requested a reconsideration, noting that "all of the aspirations for the development of the Commonwealth present within the PPD can be satisfied through free association". Comerío mayor, Josian Santiago, who was serving as interim president of the PPD Mayors Association during Miranda Marín's illness, expressed that the Resolution was unexpectedly presented before the Board and that as the representative of the mayors, he voted against it since it only served as an exclusive device. To defend Resolution JG-2010-003, Ferrer responded by saying that in his opinion "sovereignty of the state" could only mean independence, and that a "fourth option" was viable "within the Constitution of the United States", noting that a series of reunions to discuss the manual would begin in March 2010. He also tried to justify the repudiation to the concept of an "Associated Republic", claiming that it was something "invented by the supporters of statehood". Colberg Toro claimed that the approbation was done to "defend the Commonwealth" before the possibility of another local status referendum. Victoria Muñoz Mendoza coincided with Colberg and went further, claiming that the adoption of the pro-sovereignty posture in 2008 "was a mistake", expressing her belief that the Commonwealth and free association were separate entities.

The soberanistas responded by involving the base by opening an online petition, which met and exceeded the pre-established quota within hours. The internal division caused by Resolution JG-2010-003 was quickly exploited by opposing parties, Juan Dalmau labeled the new posture "statehood lite", saying that "[the] new leadership ... flirts dangerously with statehood" and equating its ideology to that of the PNP. On January 26, 2010, Acevedo Vilá criticized Resolution JG-2010-003 noting that its approval favored the PNP and urging that if the PPD "wants to clarify concepts and postures, then it should do so without threats of exclusion." This position was rebutted by Ferrer, who defended his decision. Colberg insisted that Acevedo Vilá should "move away" and blamed his involvement on a "power struggle" between the Ferrer leadership and the soberanistas that compose "[Acevedo Vilá's] internal circle", an action that was perceived as a provocation by Vega Ramos, Charlie Hernández and mild-conservative senator Eduardo Bhatia. Conservative representative Rafael "Tatito" Hernández followed this by announcing the creation of a group to defend the territorial Commonwealth and directly "face the associated republic and free association". He was joined by Carlos López, who insisted that those that believe in them "should create their own party". The initiative was largely ignored by the soberanistas, only gaining the immediate critics of Carmen Yulín who considered it divisive. In the morning of February 1, 2010, a series of posters with the phrase Fuera los soberanistas (lit. "Out with the soberanistas") and the PPD's logo where placed over San Juan. However, the conservative leadership denied involvement and instead blamed them on the PNP.

=== Pacto de Asociación, ALAS and MUS ===
Ferrer held a press conference and officially presented the contents of Pacto de Futuro, also claiming that the new focus was "not of sovereignty, but economic". Parallel to this ideological controversy, ALAS requested the right to become the official representative of free association in the Fortuño referendum. The group's spokesperson, Luis A. Delgado, noted that they intended to organize those that support the option while the conservative leadership prevented the PPD from doing so, giving the soberanistas within that party an opportunity to advance their ideology. Delgado also stated his opinion that the "fourth option" was a move to halt the advance of the free association movement within the PPD, noting that the dispositions of UN General Assembly Resolution 2625 only applied following a self-determination process where the recognition of sovereignty was inexorable and as such, could not be used to perpetuate the subordination of Puerto Rico. Vega Ramos agreed, further claiming that even if the territorial development proposed in the Pacto de Futuro was approved, Congress could always revoke their agreements as was the case with the Northern Mariana Islands. (Note: Vega Ramos was referencing "Commonwealth of the Northern Mariana Islands v. United States of America, Civil Action No. 08-1572", which approved the unilateral extension of the immigration laws of the United States to that archipelago based on the sovereignty granted to Congress under the Territorial Clause.) Under Santiago, the Mayors Association began an internal process to determine if they requested that the resolution was overturned, this strategy being separate from that of the other soberanistas who believed that the document was never the official posture of the PPD because "[it had] no weight because [the Board] cannot override what the assembly of delegates has decided."

Colberg considered that the efforts were "futile", claiming that the PPD would not participate in a referendum that excluded the territorial Commonwealth. Hernández Mayoral reacted by stating that even if the soberanistas left the PPD, they would be "too few to be considered a division", claiming that the number would surely round the 4,500 that voted for free association in the 1998 referendum. On February 15, 2010, a still ailing Miranda Marín pronounced a speech where he promoted the creation of a "country-wide project", requested clarity in the discourse of his fellow party members by noting that it was time to recognized previous errors, particularly those that had allowed the growth of the pro-statehood faction, and to use the term "colony [when referring] to what is a colony [and] sovereignty [when referring to] what is sovereignty", concluding his speech by insisting that a "rupture" with the past was needed to advance. The discourse was universally praised by the soberanistas and was perceived as a strong reprimand and warning to the conservative leadership of the PPD. In his support, Charlie Hernández noted that the mayor was asking to abandon the "paralyzing fears of the past" and that it was time to make sure that the PPD did not turn into a "facsimile pro-statehood party". ALAS extended congratulations for the speech, noting that Miranda Marín's posture opened the door for a widespread convergence. The expressions received the support of Ponce-based municipal party Movimiento Autónomo Ponceño (lit. "Autonomous Ponce Movement") through Rafael Cordero Santiago's brother, Ramón Cordero Santiago.

Hernández Mayoral responded by dismissing the speech by claiming that "95% of the PPD members don't believe in it" and insisting that it was a "call for independence", which was "incompatible [with their] stay in the PPD". Ferrer echoed this, defending the territorial Commonwealth and saying that he "could not coincide with Miranda Marín if he was supporting national sovereignty". However, despite opposing his stance, other conservatives such as Muñoz Mendoza were more cautious. On February 20, 2010, both Miranda Marín and Ferrer participated in a reunion between mayors held in Juana Díaz, which produced no change in the postures of either one, though the Caguas mayor noted that his message was "being misinterpreted" by the conservatives. During the reunion the mayor of Juana Díaz, Ramón Hernández, presented a two-step resolution proposing that if the Pacto de Futuro failed to gain acceptance in the United States, then the party should demand the sovereignty of Puerto Rico. The document was supported by the mayors of Caguas, Aguas Buenas and Comerío, but was left pending. The mayors also reached a consensus establishing that José Alfredo Hernández Mayoral did not represent them. In a subsequent article, Miranda Marín noted his belief that those that reacted defensively were "[under the influence] of the god of fear" and reaffirmed his belief, detailing how globalization had chanced the world since the establishment of the territorial Commonwealth.

While the internal debate of the PPD lingered, Collado Schwarz announced the possibility that the ISP could eventually evolve into a political party. The organization noted that through their educational activities they had noticed an increased interest in sovereignty following Miranda Marín's speech. After the Obama administration's Task Force on Status held two sessions in Puerto Rico, ALAS denounced that the format did not allow them to defend their posture despite being present in both. Felling that "[the Task Force] decided to ignore Free Association, one of the three political options the international community, as well as the United States (US), recognizes as an option which provides a full measure of self-government", the group forwarded their proposals afterwards. PROELA and a group of representatives were able to present their arguments, with the later "[urging] the Administration to include the option of "Estado Libre Asociado Soberano" (Sovereign Commonwealth) in any serious self-determination process it chooses to support."

On March 4, 2010, Hernández Mayoral who had served as the PPD's representative before the Task Force members, stated that the soberanistas that were not satisfied with his defense of the territorial Commonwealth "[were] no longer in tune with the [party]". Colberg supported him, stating that those that were against the presentation were instead "represented by Manuel Rodríguez Orellana" (the pro-independence representative), which in turn earned the response of Néstor Duprey who questioned his "power hunger", noting that "[Colberg] wasn't even elected" by popular vote. Pedro García, was among the first to criticize this posture, calling it divisive. After the soberanistas expressed their official opposition in a press conference, a group of ten conservative representatives led by Colberg and Roberto Rivera Ruiz de Porras signed a letter requesting that Luis Raúl Torres was stripped of the position of Alternate Speaker of the PPD. Later that day, the PPD members of the PR House of Representatives held a reunion that lasted 7 hours. While the status issue was considered to "require additional discussion", those present reached a consensus against "divisive expressions" and "requests for exclusion". In an interview, Miranda Marin confessed that if he was able to defeat cancer his intentions was to pursue the office of governor. ALAS publicly endorsed a possible candidature. On March 8, 2010, Sen. Antonio Fas Alzamora published a new document, worked for ten months along Ramón Luis Nieves and José Ariel Nazario, detailing his view of a compact of free association between Puerto Rico and the United States named Pacto de Asociación (lit. "Compact of Association").

To appease the conservative faction of the PPD, he stretched that the act of reclaiming sovereignty and entering into association would be simultaneous, guaranteeing that "Puerto Rico [would] not be independent for a minute". Alzamora insisted that the document attended the demands of both factions and requested that it was perceived as the instrument to bring forth internal unity. Miranda Marín considered it "a very important contribution" and urged the PPD's leadership to analyze its content. Ferrer considered it a "working document". Charlie Hernández, Luis Vega Ramos and Carmen Yulín welcomed it, while José Dalmau considered it a "well worked" proposal. ALAS expressed satisfaction with the proposal, calling it a "step in the right direction". Conservative Rafael "Tatito" Hernández was critic of it, holding a press conference to "unmask the free association of [Fas Alzamora's] Pact". The Pacto de Asociación was published in Spanish and English, and its presentation was followed by public hearings held throughout Puerto Rico. Hernández Colón went on to publish an opinion piece where he called soberanistas, within and outside the PPD, "gullible" and "romantic", identifying his wing as "pragmatic". The cases "Calero Toledo v. Pearson Yacht" (1974) and "Examining Board v. Flores de Otero" (1976) were used by the conservatives to justify the argument that "Congress renounced its control on local affairs" and that "[it] granted [Puerto Rico a degree of] autonomy comparable to that of the [US] states".

Collado Schwarz dismissed these cases on the basis that they were Cold War-era documents that contradicted the resolution approved by the US House Natural Resources Committee just months before and that neither of the cases directly attended Puerto Rico's status. He went on to quote "First National Bank vs. Yankton County, 101 U.S. 129" (1879), which states that "[any] territory within the jurisdiction of the United States not included in any State must necessarily be governed by or under the authority of Congress". On April 19, 2010, it was announced that a group linked to José Alfredo Hernández Mayoral and Roberto Pratts were pursuing a movement to reclaim the presidential vote under the territorial clause. Despite being a conservative, Ferrer joined Charlie Hernández in stating that such an initiative would "[only] be linked to statehood". During the public hearings for H.R. 2499, a group of lobbyists led by Ferrer managed to convince US Rep. Virginia Foxx to present an amendment that would include the territorial Commonwealth (described as "status quo") in the project, essentially neutralizing its intention to pursue "non territorial options". The subsequent approval of this amended proposal in the US House of Representatives was not supported by the soberanistas of the PPD. Luis Raúl Torres, Charlie Hernández and Carmen Yulín questioned why the conservatives were celebrating the inclusion of a territorial definition of the Commonwealth. ALAS also criticized it as an "attempt to prolong the anguish of the colony represented by the current Commonwealth", noting that just days after the hearings the Chairman of the US Senate Committee on Energy and Natural Resources, Jeff Bingaman, noted that free passage and double citizenship were viable under free association.

A poll held by conservative radio station NotiUNO reflected that the 46% that once supported the Commonwealth was being splintered by the internal division, with free association representing a 17% of the total vote versus 29% for the status quo. This statistic included 23% of the participants that identified themselves with the PPD and meant a growth of 15% for the pro-sovereignty option in comparison to previous polls held by the station. As H.R. 2499 moved to the US Senate Energy and Natural Resources Committee for consideration, Ferrer resumed the lobbying carried in the US House, this time confronting and accusing Pierluisi of including an association option "that references independence". The Resident Commissioner insisted that the definition of "Sovereignty in association with the United States" was directly taken from the PPD's 2008 Program of Government. The soberanistas addressed the issue on their own in a letter where they opposed the mechanism of H.R. 2499 and requested a Constituent Assembly. During the public hearings, a third of the time was devoted to free association, with Luis Delgado and José Ortiz Daliot serving as representatives for ALAS. The group later noted that none of the Committee's members expressed a posture against the concept. Afterwards, the Committee made a request for information about the viable status options, including a specific inquiry regarding the inclusion of free association. On June 4, 2010, Miranda Marín died from complication of the pancreatic cancer that he suffered. What was a notable blow to the soberanistas within the PPD quickly evolved into another confrontation between factions.

Initially the party agreed to avoid a power struggle by supporting the candidature of the late mayor's son, William Miranda Torres. However, PR Rep. José Varela decided to present a candidature and was elected by the Municipal Committee. The decision was criticized since most of the delegates had been named by Varela under Miranda Marín's administration and erupted in protests led by the late mayor's right hand man, Wilfredo Puig. However, Hernández Mayoral supported it claiming that it "[was] a legal matter". Facing the possibility that the division could cost them the next elections, the PPD decided to nullify the vote of the Municipal Committee and hold a special election to fill the vacancy, this despite Hernández Colón's support to uphold the decision. The two were joined by a third candidate, Harry Vega. While Miranda Torres sympathized with the soberanistas, Varela aligned himself with the conservative wing, claiming that he would not allow "[them] to turn Caguas into a bastion for sovereignty". Miranda Torres prevailed in the special election by gathering 71.34% of the votes and shortly afterwards reaffirmed his affiliation to the soberanistas. On June 15, 2010, Fas Alzamora presented an amended version of the Pacto de Asociación incorporating suggestions taken from the public hearings. Vega Ramos, Iván Rivera, Collado Schwarz and Omar López of ALAS attended the subsequent hearings of the UN's Decolonization Committee.

After Ferrer announced the eventual organization of an "Internal Constituent Assembly" to refine the party's status ideology, the soberanistas criticized that the Pacto de futuro was being pushed to become the official posture, since according to them "it [was not] even a pact per se", but a "manual that failed to establish specific details". PROELA and ALAS supported these arguments. Colberg Toro responded by claiming that the Pacto de Asociación had "no chance" of being approved since it was "too similar to the [association compact] of Palau" and that it "did not guarantee American citizenship [or] acquired rights." Fas Alzamora responded by saying that those expressions were "completely incorrect" and accused the conservatives of spreading "disinformation", noting that the language of the project supported the retention of both citizenship and acquired rights. Fas Alzamora went on to express "surprise", claiming that he had reunited with Colberg Toro before publishing the Pacto de Asociación and had even incorporated part of the Pacto de futuro's language to avoid ideological conflicts. Hernández Mayoral went further, claiming that the document was "plaguiated" from Palau's compact of association. Fas Alzamora discarded these expressions by labeling them as "another divisive action, of the same kind that we have grown accustomed to". After Ferrer expressed that other pro-sovereignty options did not represent a threat, ALAS replied by stating that without the soberanistas "the PPD can not win" and that their importance should not be "minimized".

On August 17, 2010, the PPD's Government Board held a reunion following the ongoing conflicts. Despite the initial expectations that the soberanistas could be sanctioned or that the Pacto de Asociación could be discarded, neither thing happened. On the other hand, the group reached a consensus stating that the Pacto de futuro was nothing more than a manual. A document presented by Hernández Mayoral against the Pacto de Asociación was defeated. The Board ordered the creation of a Status Commission presided by PPD vicepresident Carlos Delgado Altieri and completed by Fas Alzamora, Colberg Toro, Carmen Yulín and Brenda López de Arrarás. On August 25, 2010, PAIS merged efforts with the ISP. Four days later, the members of the ISP decided to organize a new party to promote sovereignty. The group noted their interest to attract non-affiliated people that support free association or independence. However, the new entity would not have a specific political posture, instead simply revolving around the demand for sovereignty. The ISP's Executive Committee was formally reorganized into a Coordination Committee and the new party was named Movimiento Unión Soberanista.

Carmen Yulín criticized the ongoing conservative discourse of the PPD, noting her belief that "those that want permanent union have the option of joining the PNP and support statehood". This in turn led to public controversy between her and Ferrer. Intending to avoid the fate of the Directorio Soberanista, the MUS noted that its focus would be to earn a base by attracting the avid voters that were now inactive. On November 9, 2010, the group applied to be recognized as a political party for the 2012 general elections. The Puerto Rico State Commission on Elections granted the authorization to gather signatures on January 11, 2011. To be officially recognized, the MUS had to gather 97,000 valid signatures. On March 1, 2010, Collado Schwarz requested an investigation to the president of the CEE, Héctor Conty Pérez, claiming that members of the PPD were calling their affiliates that had endorsed the MUS and were doing so while impersonating CEE officials. He went on to claim that the conservative leadership of the PPD's Government Board was responsible for these actions, following a reunion held on January 28, 2011. In a radio interview for Radio Isla, Ferrer refused to confirm or deny the allegations.

=== Soberanistas vs. García Padilla, 2012 referendum ===
Ferrer inherited the position of PPD president to fellow conservative Alejandro García Padilla, who on March 6, 2011, announced his intention to run as candidate for the office of governor. The soberanistas took a cautious approach to this candidature, with Charlie Hernández, Luis Raúl Torres, Carmen Yulín and Vega Ramos not supporting it initially. The group insisted that "a dialogue process had to be completed first". Immediately after taking over, García Padilla noted that his campaign would not center around the status issue and that it would be eventually attended in a Constituent Assembly. The adoption of an option historically proposed by the soberanistas served to earn their conditioned endorsement. On March 16, 2011, the President's Task Force released their report, joining the others in stating that Puerto Rico remains under the Territory Clause of the U.S. Constitution. The document also notes that any attempt to pursue an enhanced Commonwealth within the Territorial Clause would be "constitutionally problematic" and not permanent, since future Congresses retained the capacity of unilaterally modifying any agreements reached. The report proposed a mechanic that earned local critics, since it established a two-step referendum where the status alternatives were "cluttered together", the territorial Commonwealth and statehood in a "sovereignty remains in Congress" and "free association and independence" in a "Puerto Rico reclaims it sovereignty" option.

The soberanistas were not satisfied with the report since, despite the document recommending "that at the time of any transition to a freely associated state, all Puerto Rican U.S. citizens retain their U.S. citizenship", the affirmation that "Free Association is a type of independence" directly contradicted UN General Assembly Resolution 1514, which identified both as distinctly separate decolonization alternatives. The format proposed for a two-step referendum was also criticized, being considered an attempt to retain the status quo, since being paired with the numerically weak independence would mean a guaranteed loss. ALAS expressed disappointment, stating that if the territorial Commonwealth "remained as a political option, the Task Force would have failed to accomplish its purpose and assignment" and noting their "precise objections [in relation] to the characterization of Free Association as an Independence category, the two plebiscite process, and its failure to consider applicable International Law". In April 2011, the PPD's Status Commission released a report. The document included "10 principles of association" for the non-territorial development of the Commonwealth, a dissection of both the Pacto de Asociacion and the Pacto de futuro, a study of the President's Task Force report and a recommendation to establish a permanent Status Commission. The document received the support of Delgado, Fas Alzamora and Yulín, but Colberg Toro did not attend to vote and conservative López de Arrarás voted against it.

The publishing of the PPD's Status Commission report coincided with the change in administration, with García Padilla downgrading it to a "working document". This posture prevented the official presentation of the document before the Government Board and it was left indefinitely pending. Under García Padilla's leadership, the PPD ordered all PPD-affiliates that signed to certify the MUS to file another affiliation document, arguing that by endorsing another party they no longer belonged to the PPD. The MUS considered this a form of harassment and requested a clarification from Conty Pérez. The group experienced further complications, including strategic differences that led to the exit of Collado Schwarz. On October 26, 2011, noted liberal Rafael Cox Alomar was announced as the candidate for the office of Resident Commissioner. However, throughout the campaign he shied away from establishing his ideological position, instead falling in line with the conservative discourse of García Padilla, who in turn ran his campaign individually. In 2011, the conservative wing launched an aggressive campaign among the PPD's base to ensure that the soberanistas failed to be elected in to the party's Government Board centering it around both of Hernández Colón's sons. Due to the recurrent message promoting "permanent union" being used by the conservatives, the PNP approached José Alfredo Hernández Mayoral to join their party and defend statehood. On the other hand, Juan Eugenio Hernández Mayoral insisted that there was "no space" for anyone that did not share García Padilla's ideology.

When Pedro García argued that the mayors should instead vote against Hernández Mayoral, he had a discussion with the conservative mayor of Sabana Grande, Miguel 'Papin' Ortiz, who accused him of "doing Rubén Berrios' work". PROELA asked the delegates for a fair vote, telling them to ignore the ideological campaigns. Despite the campaign carried against them, all but one of the free association movement's candidates were elected, with Luis Vega Ramos and Carlos Delgado Altieri being selected via at-large voting. Carmen Yulín was elected by revalidating as president of the party's women functionaries, defeating the conservative candidate Yaramaris Torres with a margin of 1,152 to 512. Torres heavily defended the territorial status during her campaign and even criticized the soberanistas after admitting defeat. Despite being the centerpiece of the conservative campaign, neither of the Hernández Mayoral managed to gather enough votes to be among the leaders, with Juan Eugenio failing to be elected and José Alfredo only entering in last place by a slim margin. On October 4, 2011, Fortuño announced that his administration would hold a local status referendum after H.R. 2499 failed to advance in the US Senate. In the project proposed and later approved, voters were going to be asked two questions: (1) whether they agreed to continue with Puerto Rico's territorial status and -if not- (2) to indicate the political status they preferred from three possibilities: "Statehood", "Independence" or a "Sovereign Associated Free State". The referendum was set for November 6, 2012, the same day of the general elections.

On December 19, 2011, during the public hearings of the Fortuño referendum bill, Fas Alzamora proposed an amendment that would adopt the Pacto de Asociación as the definition of "Sovereign Associated Free State" in the second question. His proposal was not approved by the PNP. In February 2012, the government board led by García Padilla announced the strategy of the conservative leadership to participate in the referendum, to vote "Yes" to continuing under the territorial clause and to not vote for any of the non-territorial options listed in the second question. They claimed that a vote for "Yes" meant a "yes for Puerto Rico" and sustaining his campaign on the notion that by supporting that option Fortuño would be antagonized with a "punishment vote". However, these arguments failed to convince several of the soberanistas, who idealized their own strategy. Figures such as Carmen Yulín, Luis Raúl Torres, Miranda Torres, Isidro Negrón, Luis Vega Ramos and Antonio Fas Alzamora announced their decision to vote "Yes" in the first question to avoid entering in conflict with the conservative wing, but would also vote for the "Sovereign Free Association" option, both to directly defeat statehood and to gauge the real strength of the free association movement. Members of the free association movement topped the vote to select the party's PR House of Representative at-large candidates at the 2012 PPD's primary. Prominent soberanistas Carmen Yulín and Luis Vega Ramos were the two leaders, with Charlie Hernández ranking fourth. As was the case with the previous election the candidates endorsed by the Hernández Mayoral brothers failed to influence the process, this time with their endorsed candidates Eduardo Ferrer and Roberto Vigoreaux failing to be elected.

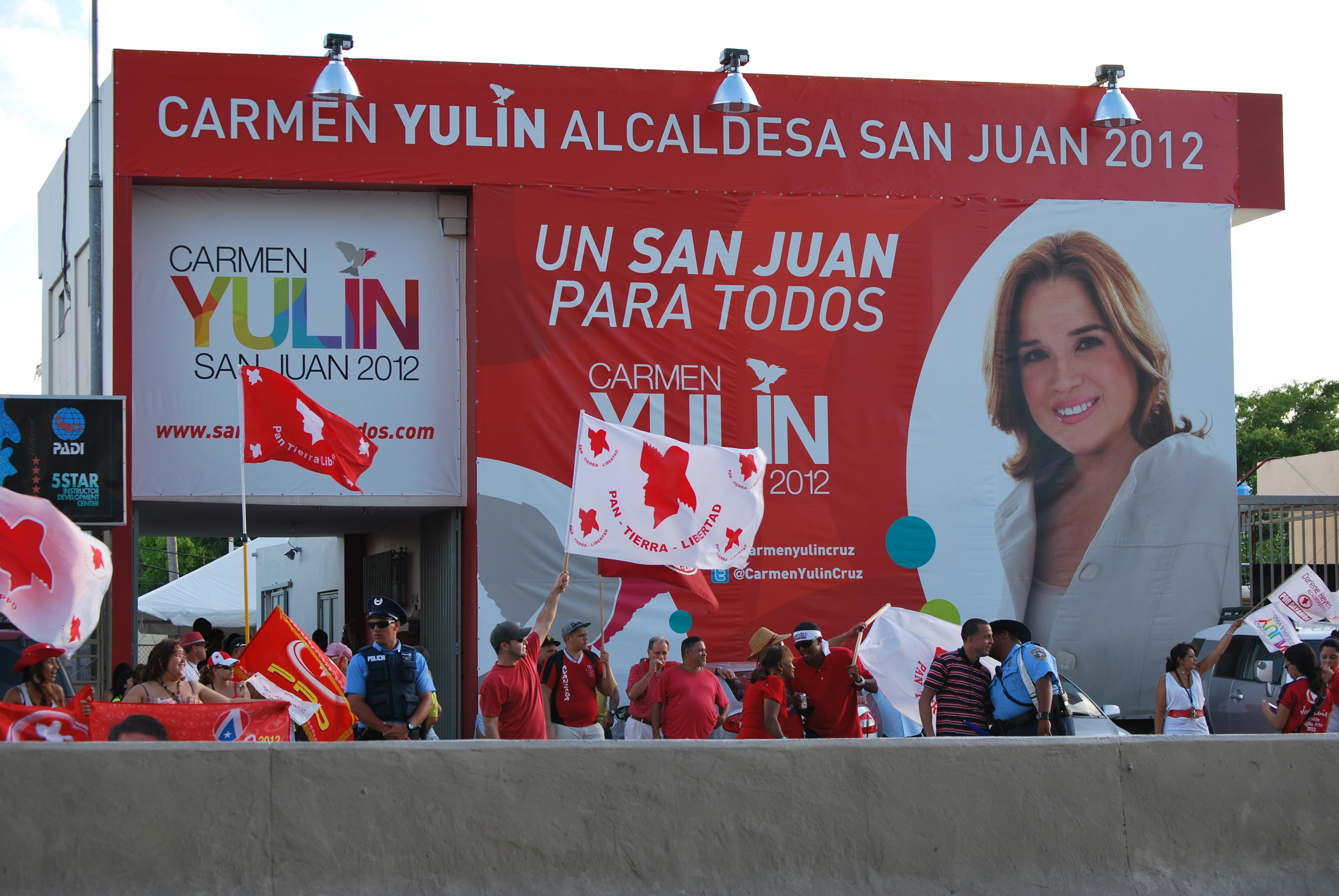
Carmen Yulín's 2012 campaign headquarters.

In April 2012, ALAS presented the signatures required to become the official representative of "Sovereign Associated Free State" in the referendum and co-representative of the "No" option. The group presented an excess of 500 additional signatures beyond the number required, among which was that of Collado Schwarz. Since early 2011, Carmen Yulín had hinted her interest in running for the mayorship of her native city of San Juan, but decided to step down when opposed by the conservative leadership of García Padilla, who named the now second in-command of that wing, Héctor Ferrer, to occupy the position. However, her name resurfaced following the resignation of Ferrer, who was forced to abandon the race due to a domestic abuse incident which led to a formal investigation. Although Yulín initially denied running for mayor of the capital city, on March 26, 2012, she announced her decision to accept the party's petition and challenge incumbent mayor Jorge Santini.

During the 2012 campaign, the gray kingbird (known in Spanish as pitirre), a bird known to persistently defend its territory even against much larger predators such as the red-tailed hawk (known locally as guaraguao) and which has become a traditional image for persistence in Puerto Rico, was adopted as a symbol by the soberanistas serving both as the official logo used by ALAS to represent "Sovereign Associated Free State" in the ballot and as the mascot used by Yulín during her campaign for the mayorship of San Juan. When Pablo José Hernández, son José Alfredo Hernández Mayoral, contradicted the official position and stated that a vote for the "Yes" option represented a vote for the status that the PPD would support, Charlie Hernández decided to defy the party's stance, choosing to vote "No" and for "Sovereign Associated Free State". García Padilla responded by imposing an indefinite suspension on Hernández, which was lifted after it was heavily criticized by members of the PPD as both "imprudent" and "unnecessary". Despite the PPD's leadership asking for abstention, polls published by the centrist El Nuevo Día and conservative El Vocero reflected that a large portion of the party's base was aligning itself with the strategy of the soberanistas, with the "Yes" option edging "No" and the ELA Soberano gathering early numbers of 42% (versus 32% of statehood) and 37% (versus 41% of statehood) respectively. Other polls placed the support at approx. 30% regardless of the fact that the option was not being officially represented by any party. Due to its nature as a non-partisan group that lacked the economic torque of political parties, ALAS' campaign was delayed until the last week of September.

While the "Sovereign Associated Free State" lost some support as the PPD's campaign advanced, its percentages consistently placed it as the only option capable of numerically challenging statehood, a fact that represented the first time that a pro-sovereignty option would reach or surpass 10% of the vote. ALAS expressed that they trusted the soberanistas of the PPD to support their ideology. During the final week of campaign, Acevedo Vilá joined this group, publicly endorsing the Sovereign Associated Free State in activities held at Caguas and Yabucoa, before posting a column explaining his reasoning in his personal website. As an ex-governor, he emerged as the de facto leader of this faction, a move that was well received by ALAS. Two other groups emerged during this week, the first was Populares Pro ELA soberano (lit. "PPD affiliates pro-Sovereign Associated Free State") composed by several PPD functionaries including José Ortiz Daliot, Julito Rodríguez, Néstor Duprey, Ariel Nazario, Agnes Crespo Quintana, Humberto Torres and Raúl Rodríguez Quiles. The second was Amigos del ELA Soberano (lit. "Friends of the Sovereign Associated Free State") was led by Collado Schwarz and included other figures such as Antonio Casillas, Marco Rigau, Enrique Vilá del Corral, Jaime Martí, Luis Rivera Cubano, Emilio Piñero Ferrer and Rafael Espasas García. After facing difficulties following the exit of their first candidate for governor, Enrique Vázquez Quintana, the MUS presented their final ballot of Arturo Hernández and María de Lourdes Guzman, also nominating José Paralitici for the PR Senate. The group also formed alliances with several PPD candidates such as Carmen Yulín, Pedro García, Luis Arroyo Chiqués and Ramón Luis Nieves.

At the 2012 General Elections the soberanistas including Luis Vega Ramos, Charlie Hernánez, Cirilo Tirado, Fas Alzamora and Luis Raul Torres were re-elected to the legislature. The group was expanded with the addition of new members such as Nieves, Maritere González, Carlos Vargas Ferrer and former Guánica mayor Martín Vargas among others. The soberanistas that occupied the mayorship of several municipalities, led by Josian Santiago, Isidro Negrón, Pedro García and Miranda Torres, retained their positions. Carmen Yulín scored what was described as the "upset of the elections", defeating Jorge Santini to become mayor of San Juan. However, in the race for Resident Commissioner, Cox Alomar lost to Pedro Pierluisi by 1.07%. García Padilla was elected governor over Fortuño with a 0.63% difference. The "Sovereign Free Association" option finished second in the status referendum by gathering 33.34% (449,679) of the valid votes. However, the other half of the PPD affiliates followed the strategy supported by Garcia Padilla, leading to 480,918 blank votes. The "No" (to continuing under the Territorial Clause) option defeated the "Yes" option 54% to 46%. Through Delgado, ALAS expressed satisfaction saying that the once diffuse free association movement was beginning to unify and saying that had a significant portion of the PPD's not followed the instructions to abstain, the option would have defeated statehood.

The governor-elect named Juan Eugenio Hernández Mayoral to direct the Puerto Rico Federal Affairs Administration (PRFAA) and had previously retained his brother in the position of Secretary of International and Federal Affairs. On the other hand, García Padilla's designated David Bernier to the office of Secretary of State of Puerto Rico in what was considered both strategy, diverting a potential challenger, and also a move to appease the free association movement. Despite never stating his political ideology in public, Bernier's was assumed to sympathize with the soberanistas, especially following his work to promote Puerto Rico's sports sovereignty while serving as president of the Puerto Rico Olympic Committee. As Secretary of State, he established a campaign for the internationalization of Puerto Rico. During his first year, Bernier secured Puerto Rico's return to CEPAL, established a school of diplomacy and supervised alimentary sovereignty projects that restarted the cultivation of rice and other crops after decades. This was further complemented by moves that reaffirmed Puerto Rico's fiscal autonomy and commercial agreements with several countries. However, Bernier admitted that his internationalization efforts were done within the limitations of the territorial Commonwealth and as such, were generally done with nations allied to the United States. Throughout 2013, he also made arrangements to join UNESCO, with Vega Ramos presenting a supporting project.

On January 2, 2013, Luis Vega Ramos presented P.C. 210, a bill supporting the organization of the Constituent Assembly, on behalf of the Bar Association of Puerto Rico. On January 30, 2013, the at-large seat acquired by Colberg Toro in the elections was left vacant. Among the group that filed candidacies for the vacancy was Luisa Gándara, Acevedo Vilá's wife and a soberanista herself, who won by gathering 174 out of 202 votes against Antonio Cruz Domenech and Carlos Rechani. In April 2013, after the Obama administration presented a budget including 2.5 millions to cost the education campaign of a future status process, García Padilla reaffirmed his support for the territorial Commonwealth and discarded the Constituent Assembly supported by the soberanistas. He repeated this stance at the Anniversary of the Constitution, where he promoted an "autonomous development" within the pre-existent territorial model. While the conservatives supported waiting for Obama's budget to get approved, the soberanistas launched their own strategy. 14 soberanistas were joined by PROELA in requesting an opinion supporting the Constituent Assembly to the UN's Decolonization Committee. A group led by Cirilo Tirado and which included Antonio Fas Alzamora, Maritere González, Martín Vargas and Ramón Luis Nieves among others announced the imminent presentation of a Constituent Assembly bill. The conservative leadership expressed that they did not support the initiative, claiming that Garcia Padilla wanted 2013 to end before taking further actions to attend the status issue. On that same day, Cox Alomar revealed that the attenuation of his pro-sovereignty discourse during the campaign was done strategically, so that there were no contrasts between candidates, and noted his belief that the territorial Commonwealth's economic model had run its course.

A week later, Luis Vega Ramos, Luis Raúl Torres, Carlos Bianchi, Carlos Vargas Ferrer, Luisa Gándara and Charlie Hernández presented a speech before the Senate Energy and Natural Resources Committee supporting a Constituent Assembly. In July 2013, ALAS entered a period of restructuration following the death of Luis Delgado. On July 1, 2013, conservative Eduardo Ferrer relinquished his position of Representative at-large for the PPD, formally opening a vacancy at the PR House for the PPD. The party announced that the position would be filled with the vote of the General Council's delegates during a special election. Only five candidates made the cut to be on the final ballot, Claribel Martínez Marmolejos, Yasmín Mejías, Carlos Rechani, Darlene Reyes and Manuel Natal Albelo. Of them only Natal was openly soberanista and his bid was considered difficult, since it placed him in direct conflict with the conservative leadership. The special election took an ideological emphasis after García Padilla dismissed the free association movement, by saying that they "are not a wing, but rather a few feathers", also illustrating his opposition to the faction by publicly supporting the seemingly neutral Martínez. The conflict was further exacerbated by the fact that García Padilla could not define what constituted the specifics for an "enhanced" territorial Commonwealth in a public hearing before the US Senate Energy and Natural Resources Committee. 13 soberanistas presented their own exposition, separate from the stance of the governor. During these hearings, the committee's president Ron Wyden expressed his belief that an "enhanced" territorial Commonwealth was unconstitutional, and its vice-president Lisa Murkowski noted that she only supported "valid options".

While Carmen Yulín demanded respect for the free association movement, Vega Ramos, Tirado and Fas Alzamora requested a return to the ELA Soberano, noting that it remained the only viable "non territorial, non colonial" development of the Commonwealth. The incident repercuted within the PPD's Youth Organization, with its vicepresident Julio José Prieto demanding an apology only to be rebuffed by its president, Elius Vick, who also endorsed Martínez. Natal indirectly referred to this event, adopting the slogan, "Quills have written the best chapters of our history." When Hernández Colón claimed that the group was still small, fellow conservative Jaime Perelló disagreed, admitting that the wing had notably expanded with time. Subsequently, Tirado's group drafted a resolution in support of the Constituent Assembly and expressed their intention to present it before the party's base at the PPD Convention scheduled for August 18, 2013. In the days leading to the special election, the PPD's leadership strengthened its campaign to secure the votes for Martínez, including public support from Eduardo Bhatia, President of the Senate of Puerto Rico, and Perelló, Speaker of the House. Carmen Yulín also supported her nomination. Public reports claimed that the PPD's conservative leadership was aggressive in its support campaign for Martínez, even offering jobs to the delegates in exchange for their votes. The special election took place on August 14, 2013, with Natal defeating Martínez with a margin of 175 to 131, with 20 votes being divided between the other candidates. Afterwards, Yulín explained her support, revealing her knowledge that Martínez also sympathized with the soberanistas but had opted to keep it a secret.

At the PPD Convention, the soberanistas reunited with García Padilla in private to discuss the Constituent Assembly resolution. After a period of negotiations that lasted over ten hours, Tirado allowed the proposal to be presented without directly referencing that the option presented by the PPD had to be "non colonial [and] non territorial". However, the language that established the automatic inclusion of past resolutions included the ELA Soberano and post-Enmienda Vizcarrondo resolutions by default and remained unchanged, essentially establishing the same proposal without directly stating so. The following day, Tirado's group presented its bill to hold a Constituent Assembly before the Senate of Puerto Rico. Despite this, Tirado also presented a second Constituent Assembly project on behalf of the Bar Association of Puerto Rico. Sister project P.C. 1334 was presented by a group led by Luis Vega Ramos and Carlos Vargas in the PR House of Representatives. Natal's first official action in the legislature was to serve as cosponsor of this bill. Acevedo Vilá supported the move, but recommended that the process was renamed "Status Assembly", to avoid the confusion that it intended to modify the Constitution of Puerto Rico. The PIP went on to draft its own Constituent Assembly proposal which was introduced by Maria de Lourdes Santiago in the PR Senate, with a sister project being presented by the PPD in the PR House since the PIP did not have representation in the lower house. On December 13, 2013, Wyden and Murkowski sent letters to the leaders of the PPD, PIP and PNP, stating that the "enhanced [territorial] Commonwealth [was] not viable". While the conservatives minimized these expressions, the soberanistas requested internal discussion to retake the pursue of a "non territorial, non colonial" development to the Commonwealth.

All of the Constituent Assembly bills were to be evaluated in the public hearings of a bicameral Joint Commission, headed by Ángel Rosa in Senate and José Varela in the House. However, the approval of 2.5 millions for a referendum overseen by the US Department of Justice in the Obama administration's budget led to a pause in actions. Despite the development, the soberanistas felt that a Constituent Assembly should take place first, serving as the negotiation table between Puerto Rico, the US Department of Justice and Congress, with the viable options that emerged from this collaboration being voted for in a referendum. After several months of inactivity, García Padilla revived the Joint Commission by requesting it to evaluate both alternatives and to offer specific recommendations.

== Other movements and activism ==
In 2002, Julio Muriente of the Movimiento Independentista Nacional Hostosiano (MINH) a moderate pro-independence group, argued that if the free association movement gained prominence within the PPD, it was only a matter of time until the inmovilism surrounding the status debate was vanquished. Historian Ángel Collado Schwarz also created a radio show, where he discussed several historical events and topics, often discussing their relation to the status issue and sovereignty. The artistic class instead opted to support free association in their own medium, without directly entering the political arena. The most notable example was actor Víctor Alicea whose character, Epifanio González Villamil, had become an unofficial mascot to the PPD throughout the years. In 2009, after portraying the character as a fanatical follower of the PPD without taking a stance in the ideological struggle for more than two decades, Epifanio declared himself a soberanista. Alicea then began citing Miranda Marín, Cordero and Aponte as examples for the current leaders to follow. This move was made official with a "welcome card" issued by Carmen Yulín Cruz, Luis Vega Ramos and Charlie Hernández. The character also ran a tongue-in-cheek gubernatorial primary campaign within the PPD. He adopted the slogan Soberano y bonitillo pa' sacar a to' esos pillos (lit. "Sovereign(sic) and good lookin' to kick out all those thieves") which he employed in a faux campaign. Non partisan demonstrations include that of Miguel Rodríguez, who on February 2, 2014, began an impromptu manifestation in front of La Fortaleza in support of free association, returning to the original vision of the PPD and of Miranda Marín's pro-sovereignty project. In 2014, Socialist International President George Papandreou appeared before the United Nations Special Committee on Decolonization to support the resolution on the status of Puerto Rico, and the Socialist Party adopted a resolution at a conference in Mexico City.

== See also ==
- Timeline of sovereigntism in Puerto Rico (1970s–1990s)

== Footnotes ==
=== Bibliography ===
- Roberto Colón Ocasio (2009). Antonio Fernós - Soberanista, Luis Muñoz Marín - Autonomista: Divergencias ideológicas y su efecto en el desarrollo del Estado Libre Asociado de Puerto Rico (in Spanish). Ediciones Puerto. p. 138. ISBN 978-1934461662.
