= Loida =

- Gender: Female
- Language: Spanish

Origin
- Language: Greek

Other names
- See also: Lois

Loida is a feminine given name of Greek origin derived from 'Lois'. It is most widely used in Spanish-speaking countries.

It has declined in use since the early 20th century in the United States. As of 2023, there were 950 people named Loida living in Spain, including 215 in the Province of Barcelona and 98 in the Community of Madrid, with their average age being 37.7 years old.

Notable people with the name include:

- Loida Figueroa Mercado (1917–1996), Puerto Rican historian, writer, and educator
- Loida Garcia-Febo, Puerto Rican librarian
- Loida Nicolas Lewis (born 1942), Filipino-born American businesswoman
- Loida Maritza Pérez (born 1963), Dominican-born American writer
- Loida Zabala Ollero (born 1987), Spanish powerlifter
