= Carlos Gallisá =

Puerto Rican politician (1933–2018)

At-Large Member of the Puerto Rico House of Representatives
- In office 1972–1976

Personal details
- Born: 3 October 1933 Camuy, Puerto Rico
- Died: 7 December 2018 (aged 85) San Juan, Puerto Rico
- Party: Puerto Rican Independence Party (PIP); Puerto Rican Socialist Party (PSP)
- Education: University of Puerto Rico School of Law (JD)
- Occupation: Attorney, legislator, politician, political analyst

Carlos Gallisá Bisbal (3 October 1933 in Camuy, Puerto Rico – 7 December 2018 in San Juan, Puerto Rico) was a Puerto Rican attorney, politician, and independence movement leader.

== Education ==
After graduating from the University of Puerto Rico School of Law, Gallisá practiced labor law. He became politicized through the Vieques protests against the United States Navy.

== Politics ==
He was elected to the House of Representatives as a member of the Puerto Rican Independence Party (PIP) in 1972. In 1973 he left the PIP to join the more radical Puerto Rican Socialist Party (PSP). In 1983, Gallisá became general secretary of the PSP.

Gallisá suffered harassment due to his politics, including a firebombing of his law office. He testified at the United Nations on the decolonization issue.

Following the disbanding of the PSP in 1993, Gallisá became a leader of the New Puerto Rican Independence Movement and later the Hostosian National Independence Movement. He was also a columnist for the newspaper Claridad ("Clarity") and commentator on a regular news program on "Fuego Cruzado" ("Crossfire"), a radio program aired by WSKN-AM in San Juan, Puerto Rico.

== Publications ==
- La encrucijada colonial. (1991) Dewey Call Number from the Puerto Rican Collection at the University of Puerto Rico 320.97295 G171e
- Desde Lares. (2010) Dewey Call Number from the Puerto Rican Collection at the University of Puerto Rico 972.95 G171d

== Death ==
Gallisá Bisbal died in his home in San Juan, Puerto Rico, on 7 December 2018. He was 85 years old.
