= Hostosian National Congress =

Small left-wing and pro-independence organization in Puerto Rico

The National Hostosian Congress (Spanish: Congreso Nacional Hostosiano, CNH) was a small left-wing and pro-independence organization in Puerto Rico. Led by Héctor L. Pesquera, many of its members were formerly involved in the Puerto Rican Socialist Party. In 2004, the CNH joined with the New Puerto Rican Independence Movement to form the Hostosian National Independence Movement (MINH).
