= Claridad =

Spanish-language weekly newspaper based in San Juan, Puerto Rico

- January 7, 2009 front page
- Type: Weekly newspaper
- Format: Tabloid
- Owner(s): Periódico de la Nación Puertorriqueña, Inc.
- Founder: Juan Mari Brás (Note: "Juan Mari Brás (Fundador) 1927-2010")
- Founded: 1959
- Political alignment: Liberal-socialist, center-left leaning
- Language: Spanish
- Headquarters: San Juan, Puerto Rico
- Website: claridadpuertorico.com

Claridad ("Clarity") is a Spanish-language weekly newspaper based in San Juan, Puerto Rico. It was founded in June 1959. The paper served as the official publication of the Puerto Rican independence movement and later the Puerto Rican Socialist Party (PSP). The paper has been praised for its strong political and investigative reporting. It continues to be published weekly despite the fact that the PSP was disbanded in 1993. Many former PSP members continue to contribute to the paper.

Its central supplement, "En Rojo" ("In Red") is one of the best cultural magazines in the island, featuring historical and literary articles, movie reviews, and linguistic contributions from Puerto Rico's best writers and intellectuals.

Claridad's yearly event dubbed "Festival de Claridad" began as a fund-raising event in 1974, (Note: In 1974 the paper was in its 35th anniversary of the event (see top of the paper image in the infobox). Assuming the event never skipped any yearly celebration, it started in 1974.) but has become one of the most important musical and cultural events in Puerto Rico. It attracts tens of thousands of participants and some of the most prominent exponents of various musical genres.

Many famous Puerto Ricans have made regular contributions to Claridad, either as editors, writers or graphic artists, including: René Marqués, César Andreu Iglesias, Juan Mari Brás, Carlos Gallisá, Lorenzo Homar, Carlos Raquel Rivera, Francisco Manrique Cabrera, Elizam Escobar, Alfredo Lopez, Elliott Castro and others. Claridad's current featured writers include: Joserramón Meléndez, Raquel Z. Rivera, Gervasio Morales, Irving García, Luz Nereida Pérez, and fictional character Fiquito Yunqué, among others.

== See also ==
- List of newspapers in Puerto Rico
