= Fiquito Yunqué =

Fictional character who wrote for the Puerto Rican weekly newspaper Claridad

Carlos Federico Yunqué González, more commonly known as Fiquito Yunqué, is a fictional character (the name is actually a heteronym) who formerly wrote a weekly humor column for the Puerto Rican weekly newspaper Claridad titled "Me Mudo a La Esquizofrenia" ("I'm Moving to Schizophrenia") for close to two years (2007–2009). "Me Mudo" has been published as a blog since February 1, 2009 on Blogger. The column has developed a cult following among Claridad readers, with fans in the United States, Spain, Colombia, Argentina, Mexico and Chile.

== Early history ==
During close to twenty years in its 51-year run, Claridad featured a comedy column named "Entrando Por La Salida" ("In Through The Out Door"), initially inspired by Eddie López's comedic style. The column's author was a fictional character named Fernando Clemente, whose identity had been closely guarded by Claridad's Editorial Board through the character's run. The name was actually a pseudonym for Roberto Fernández, a lawyer who wanted to honor Roberto Clemente but didn't want to use his own name as part of the pseudonym. Speculation about Clemente's identity lasted until his death in 2011.

A reorganization at the newspaper left it without comedy writers. Since Claridad tends to have a rather serious tone, many readers demanded that Clemente return. When it became evident that this was not possible (the last author of the column rejected the idea, hinting that he had left Claridad in less than favorable terms), Claridad went on a search for a replacement. This search ended with the publication of an interview that preempted the first "Me Mudo" column: a conversation between José Elías Torres (head of the news department for WPAB-AM in Ponce, Puerto Rico and a Claridad editorial board member) and Yunqué. This interview was featured on the February 7, 2007 edition of Claridad.

== The Character ==
Fiquito (a nickname which is the diminutive of "Federico", or "little Fico") is a pseudonym, as that of his predecessor. However, an entire life history of the character has been revealed through bits and pieces published in various "Me Mudo A La Esquizofrenia" columns.

Fiquito was born in Mayagüez, Puerto Rico, approximately in 1977. He is an Industrial Engineer, married, and has no children. The column's by-line claims that Fiquito is a "musician, writer and mental patient" who claims responsibility for his words, "or so he says".

Fiquito's family embodies all political factions in Puerto Rico. His paternal grandfather was a die-hard supporter of Puerto Rican independence; his maternal grandfather was a supporter of statehood for Puerto Rico. His father is a reluctant follower of the Popular Democratic Party of Puerto Rico (PPD in Spanish), while his mother is a passionate supporter of the New Progressive Party of Puerto Rico (NPP). Since the Yunqués and the Gonzálezes cover all the political spectrum in Puerto Rico, Fiquito grew up politically confused. He claims to be Melina León's second cousin.

He claimed to have developed a conscience as nationalistic as he could possibly develop while growing up in Puerto Rico. His high school hobby was playing electric guitar in a grunge garage band.

Fiquito joined the University of Puerto Rico at Río Piedras in 1995, attempting to pursue a humanities degree. He loved Puerto Rican and Caribbean history, but realized he could not make a living in the humanities in an academic setting, something he detested. At the same time, he met the American-born daughter of an English literature professor, with whom he had an enduring affair that had him almost lose a semester of school ("a full semester of sex and Shakespeare", he claims). She had been raised in Puerto Rico and was a member of the Federación Universitaria Pro Independencia; her extreme political activism stunned Fiquito.

Fiquito opted for a transfer and moved to the University of Puerto Rico at Mayagüez, from which he got an Industrial Engineering degree in 2001. Eventually he met his wife, Diana (nicknamed "La Colorá", or "The Red One", because of both her fair complexion and fiery character) and moved back to the metro area of San Juan. He has recently moved back to Mayagüez, at least temporarily.

== Me Mudo a la Esquizofrenia ==
=== Name ===
The name "Me Mudo a la Esquizofrenia" is the last line in a poem by Ingrid Rodriguez, a writer and psychology professor at the Inter American University of Puerto Rico. Fiquito found the poem in a personal web page for the author, and requested her permission to use it as a column title.

The title, according to Fiquito, is a threat: the speaker threatens to move to a chaotic place (which the author hints is the city of San Juan, Puerto Rico, but according to Fiquito could better be suited to describe Puerto Ricans in Orlando, Florida. The column's logo pictures a brain preserved in a jar, with sunglasses in the outside as to resemble the brain as being ready for a sunny day.

=== Writing style ===
Fiquito's writing style has been compared to that of writers Nemesio Canales, Juan Goytisolo and "Miguel Ángel Rodríguez, "El Sevilla", lead singer and lyricist of the Spanish heavy metal band "Mojinos Escozíos", who is a regular writer on comedy magazines in Spain.

Fiquito tends to start every column with a humorous Latin quote, be them humorous sayings or popular Puerto Rican phrases. This parodies the serious style of a political scholar, the now deceased Antonio Fernós López-Cepero, who was a regular writer in El Nuevo Dia, the largest newspaper in Puerto Rico (and the son of Antonio Fernós-Isern). Fiquito's topics gravitate around subjects in Puerto Rican sociology, although he often covers political subject matter. He makes constant references to Puerto Rican and Latin American historical events (some rather obscure to his readers) as to parody current events by contrast. He later asked Claridad readers to nominate him as a write-in candidate for the governorship of Puerto Rico for the 2008 general elections, merely as a protest vote. He claimed he spent US$63.00 in his entire campaign, and used Roy Brown Ramírez's song "Señor Inversionista" as a campaign song. There is no evidence of the number of write-in votes Fiquito obtained in the election.

Song lyrics of popular Puerto Rican artists and other Puerto Rican pop culture elements are often quoted. However, Fiquito is particularly fond of Calle 13, and particularly, of its lyricist René Pérez's irreverent and sarcastic style. Various of Fiquito's columns have Calle 13 lines as column titles. In a rare public appearance, Fiquito introduced the band for an abbreviated set when it appeared at the 2008 Support for Claridad festival in San Juan on April 24, 2008.

==== Fiquito's musical influences ====
Besides being a hardcore fan of Calle 13, Fiquito is also a fan of Tego Calderón, Simian Mobile Disco and Bob Marley.

=== Political philosophy ===
Fiquito is an extreme supporter of Puerto Rican independence, but at the same time, he claims to hold a pragmatic, Puerto Rican-centric view on how the movement, perceived as having a waning popularity in current times, should regain mass appeal to Puerto Ricans. At the same time, he rejects what he perceives as the orthodoxy of the traditional pro-independence movements, particularly the Puerto Rican Independence Party, whose leadership he abhors. He reserves his strongest words for the political leadership of the NPP (a constant target), although he can be equally harsh to political leaders of all the other Puerto Rican parties.

Fiquito also considers himself a "recovering Roman Catholic" (he spent a year playing guitar on Sunday masses) and an acknowledged product of colonialism in Puerto Rico, adopting local and foreign cultural references equally. He is somewhat abashed of both circumstances.

==== Criticism ====
Some Claridad readers have criticized the character's irreverent political views. A very vocal opponent of Fiquito is Yeyo Rodríguez, another Mayagüez native, a pro-independence icon in Puerto Rico (and a contemporary of Juan Mari Brás) who wrote a criticism of the character in Claridad once.

== Recent Work ==
Yet another reorganization at Claridad left Yunqué off the weekly. He has since turned to Blogger to publish his column, at roughly weekly intervals. A fan page in Facebook lists over 2,000 followers (as of January 2012), including a fan in Indonesia. Fiquito has also published several articles in the Puerto Rican sex blog, Desexo, edited by graphical artist Victoria Cano. He has been featured in various airings of "El Show de Castor", a Friday night broadcast by the UPR-Río Piedras student internet collective Radio Huelga, and in news analyst Inés Quiles' radio program, "Si no lo digo, reviento", aired on WSKN-AM in San Juan. Journalist Wilda Rodríguez occasionally quoted Fiquito in her radio program, La Bola de Pegao, which aired on Boricua 740, a news radio station based in San Juan, until January 2012. He is also a columnist for Argentinean web portal medioslentos.com since November 2012.

Future plans for the column have been hinted but not revealed; they include a book.

== See also ==
- Claridad
