= Wilfredo Mattos Cintrón =

Puerto Rican author and educator

Wilfredo Mattos Cintròn (born approx. 1945) is a Puerto Rican author and educator. He has written numerous books, specializing in fiction and Puerto Rican political issues.

== Short biography ==
Mattos Cintrón was one of the leaders of the Puerto Rican Socialist Party, or PSP, along with Hector Melendez and Juan Mari Bras before leaving due to differences with Mari Bras, who in turn became the party's candidate for governor at Puerto Rico's 1976 and 1980 general elections. He graduated from the National Autonomous University of Mexico in 1971, with a Master of Science degree.

In 1972, a book named "Viva Puerto Rico Libre"-"Long Live Free Puerto Rico", was published in Havana, Cuba. An edition by Mattos Cintrón was published in Mexico during 1980 as part of the "Serie Popular Era" by Ediciones Era, and distributed to other Latin American countries such as Argentina. This book was not sold in Puerto Rico, partly because it (Mattos Cintrón's edition at least) was published during an era in which the island was governed by Carlos Romero Barcelo of the pro-statehood New Progressive Party of Puerto Rico.

In 2010, when Puerto Rican police entered the Universidad de Puerto Rico Rio Piedras in order to repress protests during a student strike, Mattos Cintrón, who is a professor of physics there, publicly protested police presence at the university.

Apart from his political activity and teaching, Mattos Cintrón has also been interviewed on television and the internet.

== Books written ==
- "Viva Puerto Rico Libre-La política y lo político en Puerto Rico" ("Long Live Free Puerto Rico-Politics and Politicking in Puerto Rico"), México, 1980
- "Puerta sin casa: Crisis del PSP y encrucijada de la izquierda. Tomo 1" ("Door Without a House: PSP's crisis and Leftist Crossroads, Part 1") Puerto Rico, 1984
- "El cerro de los buitres (novel)" ("Case of the Vultures") Puerto Rico, 1984, 1992
- "El cuerpo bajo el puente (novel)" ("The Corpse Under the Bridge") Puerto Rico, 1989
- "Las dos caras de Jano (novel)" ("The Two Faces of Jano") Puerto Rico, 1995
- "Las puertas de San Juan (novel)" ("San Juan's Doors") Puerto Rico, 1997
- "El colapso (novel)" ("The Collapse") Puerto Rico, 2000
- "Desamores (novel)" ("Broken Love") Puerto Rico, 2001
- "Deconstruyendo a (novel)" ("Deconstructing") Puerto Rico, 2005
- "Bailando al derecho y al revés (novel)" ("Dancing Upside Down") Puerto Rico, 2007
- "Letramuerto: Asesinato en La Tertulia" Puerto Rico, 2010 ("Dead Letter: Murder at the Chat Place")
