= Puerto Rican Socialist Party =

Political party

Puerto Rican Socialist Party Partido Socialista Puertorriqueño
- Abbreviation: PSPR
- Founded: 1971
- Dissolved: 1993; 33 years ago
- Headquarters: San Juan, Puerto Rico
- Ideology: Socialism; Marxism; Revolutionary socialism; Puerto Rican independence
- Political position: Left-wing to far-left

The Puerto Rican Socialist Party (Spanish: Partido Socialista Puertorriqueño, PSPR) was a Marxist and pro-independence political party in Puerto Rico seeking the end of United States of America control on the Hispanic and Caribbean island of Puerto Rico. It proposed a "democratic workers' republic".

== History ==
The PSP originated as the Movimiento Pro-Independencia (MPI), founded on January 11, 1959, in the city of Mayagüez. The MPI was formed by a group of dissidents from the Puerto Rican Independence Party (PIP), former militants of the Nationalist Party of Puerto Rico and the Communist Party of Puerto Rico, and university students, some of them members of the Federación de Universitarios Pro Independencia (FUPI), including such figures as Lidia Barreto, Rafael Cancel Rodríguez, Loida Figueroa Mercado, Juan Mari Brás and Santiago Mari Pesquera, among others. The MPI was greatly influenced by the Cuban Revolution.

During the 1964 and 1968 elections, and the 1967 plebiscite on the political status of Puerto Rico, the MPI promoted a boycott. Throughout the decade the MPI campaigned against the presence of big US corporations denouncing they hindered the island's development, destroyed native industries and agriculture, and exploited the workers. The MPI gathered sympathies among students, workers, intellectuals and poor communities, and advocated civil disobedience and resistance. Opposition amongst the youth and students to compulsory military service in the US Army (in which Puerto Ricans had to serve since 1917); to the presence of the ROTC at the University of Puerto Rico; to aggressive US military policies in the Caribbean, Latin America, Southeast Asia and elsewhere; and to American military installations on the island fueled the activity of the MPI and this in its turn created a perspective of a possible decolonization.

The MPI proposed independence for Puerto Rico had to be conquered through popular mobilization and judged that an independent Puerto Rico would have to explore non-capitalist routes of development. Both the MPI and PSP made thorough Marxist analyses of Puerto Rican society, politics and economy in their programs and declarations.

At its Eighth General Assembly on November 28, 1971, the MPI transformed itself into the Puerto Rican Socialist Party. Juan Mari Brás was named the PSP's general secretary, and Carlos Gallisá Bisbal later became party president. The party gained a following in the labor movement, student movement, and community organizations. The PSP was also an observer organization at the Non-Aligned Movement. It claimed an internationalist ideology and saw the struggle of Puerto Rico as a part of the struggle for national liberation and against capitalism of the oppressed, colonial and neocolonial countries especially in Africa, Asia, the Caribbean, and the Americas.

The PSP maintained it was the first attempt to unify the social and economic struggles of the working class, traditionally channeled by pro-annexation forces favoring total integration of Puerto Rico into the US, and the independence struggle, traditionally channeled by middle class and bourgeois nationalist groups. The working classes had to be the leading force if national liberation was to come about, and independence had to mean a higher stage of social and economic life for the majorities and a true democracy, enjoying a working class government.

The flag of the PSP was red with a white five-point star at the upper left corner. The MPI flag had had the same design except that the bottom half of the flag was black. The emblem of the PSP was a clenched fist inside an industrial gear-wheel. The Internationale anthem was often sung in its rallies and mass meetings, as well as the Puerto Rican national anthem, La Borinqueña, with its revolutionary lyrics.

The PSP further developed Claridad, the newspaper created by the MPI, and made it a news and analysis paper with considerable impact on the rest of the media and the general public. Claridad was first a weekly, later on it came out twice a week, and between 1974 and 1976 it was a daily. It featured scoops on corruption, on the links between private interests and the politicians and bureaucrats, and on the intrigues regarding the unsolved question of the status of Puerto Rico. It ran stories of human interest on local problems, unemployment, poverty, environment, communities, schools, health, migration, and other topics. Claridad featured also sections of literature and the arts, and sports, and stressed themes on Puerto Rican history such as past stages of the independence movement, and the resistance of the Taino Indians and the Black slaves.

The party had a political education system for its militants and sympathizers and a bookshop and promoted popular local papers and newsletters. It managed to record and launch protest and patriotic singers and musicians, some of which later have gained wider audiences and become a part of the Latin American Nueva Trova musical trend, such as Roy Brown, Noel Hernandez, Antonio Caban-Vale "El topo", Pepe y Flora, Andres Jimenez "El jibaro", and the Frank Ferrer band. The PSP also had links with theatre groups, like Anamu.

== Development ==
The socialist movement in Puerto Rico grew in the 1960s and 1970s despite police repression and terrorist activities from right-wing Cuban exiles, pro-Statehood, and pro-Commonwealth Puerto Ricans. The movement included a diversity of groups, ranging from socialist Christians to clandestine armed organizations. The PSP was prominent within this movement.

The MPI and PSP launched campaigns against US military bases on the island, including campaigns against bombing drills by the US Navy on Vieques and Culebra, and against environmental destruction.

The MPI-PSP demanded freedom for Puerto Rican Nationalist political prisoners incarcerated in the US for armed actions in Washington, DC, in 1950 and 1954 denouncing US colonial rule in Puerto Rico. In the United Nations it repeatedly denounced US colonialism in Puerto Rico.

The MPI and PSP continued the tradition set in the 1930s by Nationalist leader Pedro Albizu Campos of holding a massive rally commemorating the 1868 anticolonial uprising against Spanish rule at the small mountain town of Lares each 23 September. Puerto Rico had been a Spanish colonial possession from 1493 to 1898, when it was taken by the US after the Spanish–American War.

"La alternativa socialista", the 1974 political thesis of the PSP, maintained that a workers' power was necessary to provoke a crisis of the colonial system in Puerto Rico; independence would emerge from this crisis. The party realized that a patient political work of the party among the working class at mass and educational levels would be necessary for this, as well as armed resistance. Alternative social and political structures of power would also have to be created parallel to the colonial and capitalist structures of power. Independence would be a result of the revolutionary organization of the people: it did not have to wait for some decision from the American government allowing it. The document maintained that the Puerto Rican people had a right to independence; to take back its social and natural resources; to socialize the means of production, and to use all forms of struggle available to achieve these ends. The growth and strength of a workers' party with a collective leadership, acute theory, mass influence, and a policy of alliances with other social groups was indispensable for this strategy. The party had to be constructed with both practical flexibility and ideological unity and would become the vanguard of the working people only by the people recognizing it as such, not by self-designation.

=== Branches in the mainland ===
PSP branches emerged in the United States, most prominently among the Puerto Rican communities in the zones of New York City and Chicago. The PSP was primarily responsible for a pro-independence rally that drew 20,000 people to Madison Square Garden on October 27, 1974, and was broadcast on television. PSP members were also active in the movement against the Vietnam War. The PSP saw the Puerto Rican struggle as a part of the struggle of Latin America against US imperialism.

=== FBI interference ===
The PSP faced disruption from the FBI's COINTELPRO program and attacks from anticommunist and antisocialist forces on the island. Mari Brás's son, Santiago Mari Pesquera, was murdered mysteriously in March 1976, and the offices and printing press of the PSP newspaper Claridad were bombed. Several party members narrowly escaped murder attempts. Other party members were accused of possessing weapons and explosives, but the prosecution's case failed to progress. Police kept files of tens of thousands of sympathizers of the PSP and other groups.

== 1970s ==
A few years after its foundation, the PSP had gained influence on sections of the island's work force. PSP committees emerged among workers of state infrastructure enterprises such as those producing electricity and services of water and telephone, as well as government and hospital employees, and teachers. A worker of the Puerto Rico Electric Power Authority (PREPA) and leader of the latter's labor union UTIER, Luis Lausell Hernández, would be in 1980 the PSP candidate for governor. Socialist activity coincided with the flourishing of new trade union movements on the island, which in some cases accused big labor unions of the US operating in Puerto Rico of promoting a "colonialist trade unionism". The PSP had following also among university and secondary school students, and professions like lawyers, doctors, and professors.

The PSP proposed a revolutionary struggle and went into electoral politics as a tactical means to broadcast its message, participating in the island's 1976 and 1980 elections. In 1976 Mari Brás was candidate for governor. He and the party's insignia obtained 10,728 votes, whereas socialist veteran labor leader Pedro Grant, running for the island's Senate, obtained more than 20,000 votes, and Gallisá, running for the House of Representatives, gathered more than 80,000. The votes for the PSP amounted to 0.7 per cent of the total.

Socialist activity from 1971 onwards and PSP electoral participation in 1976 contributed indirectly to a hike in the votes for the Puerto Rican Independence Party, although both organizations rarely unified efforts. In 1972 the PIP's program was influenced by socialism, its title being "Arriba los de abajo!" Votes for the PIP in 1972 were 5.4 per cent of the total, more than in 1968, when it reached 3.5 per cent. In 1976 the PIP took 5.7 per cent of the votes. After the 1976 election PSP leaders claimed that many votes for the party were not counted by the main parties, which had representatives in every electoral college while the PSP did not, being a smaller organization. The votes in 1976 were not enough for the PSP to remain registered as an electoral franchise, and it had to collect signatures once more in order to compete in 1980.

In 1977, internal disagreements took place within the PSP, one being over what priority the organization would give to guerrilla warfare and strategic preparation for politico-military struggle. Other debates were on how to promote national independence and socialism in a US territory where, unlike colonial regimes in Africa or Asia, the colonial establishment was a part of modern capitalism and managed to relatively satisfy social and economic needs of the popular classes, skilled labor and high wages were common, wide health and school systems existed, and commerce and financial activity were extensive given the gradual integration of Puerto Rico into the economy of the United States.

The party adopted a new program in 1978 proposing a more modern form of politics that recognized the "democratic-bourgeois" modernizing aspects of US presence on the island. The new program indirectly criticized practices of nationalist desperation and Stalinism. It reassured the concept of the Leninist vanguard party while assigning importance to civil society, grass-roots movements, alliances, and mass politics. The 1978 program reflected influence of the theories of Italian Marxist Antonio Gramsci. It also reassured both revolutionary armed action and electoral politics, given the electoral culture of Puerto Ricans since the early 20th century.

== 1980s ==
Nevertheless, the activity of the party lessened in the following years. In 1980, 5,224 votes were accounted for the PSP governor candidacy of Lausell Hernández, or 0.3 per cent of the total, while PIP votes accounted for 5.4 per cent. But PSP Senate candidate Mari Brás took more than 50,000 votes, and Gallisá, running again for the local House, obtained around 90,000. As with the 1976 PSP electoral participation, some claimed the 1980 votes were too few, while others argued the electoral experiences had to be seen as part of a long-run process of building a mass workers' party and that the overwhelming US propaganda, ideological control and political repression had to be taken into account.

In 1982, a new rift took place between the traditional nationalist-oriented leadership, led by Mari Brás and Gallisá, and a group of militants who claimed the leadership was not taking seriously the tasks of building a working-class party and implementing the 1978 program. The debate was sparked by the resignation of Wilfredo Mattos Cintrón, member of the Political Commission, secretary of political education, and a leading figure in the drafting of the 1978 program as well as previous programs and theses. A fraction of the party denounced the leadership for concealing from the base a plan to give up the strategy of building a workers' party. Some of its members were journalist Héctor Meléndez Lugo, organizer Wilfredo López Montañez, and San Juan party secretary Marta E. Fernández. The group was defeated by a large majority loyal to Mari Brás and Gallisá and with rather nationalistic leanings. A part of the opposition fraction left the party that same year.

In their turn, Mari Brás and Gallisá did not deny they were giving up the creation of a workers' party. They said the priority should be to create a wide and pluralist national liberation movement, which they did not clearly define. The opposition group claimed that a working-class party did not contradict a wide anticolonial front of alliances, and, in fact, the latter would be more probable if a workers' party existed and influenced the relation of forces on the island.

The 1982 split manifested a latent conflict between nationalism and socialism. Similar tensions had surfaced during the MPI stage, in a disagreement in 1970 between Mari Brás and another leader of the organization, Marxist journalist and novelist César Andreu Iglesias. In the 1970s Mattos Cintrón had written that within the PSP coexisted a "radicalized nationalist petite bourgeois" wing along with the socialist tendency, although for a previous phase this coexistence played a positive role.

Mattos Cintrón and the 1982 opposition argued that the absence of a strong left-wing in the island would weaken the cause for independence and other attempts of sovereignty for Puerto Rico. The national struggle, they said, grew only in close relation with the popular and working classes.

== Demise ==
The PSP name was maintained during the 1980s, but the organization ceased political activity among the working class. The PSP was formally disbanded in 1993. Mari Brás and other former PSP leaders later became involved in the Hostosian National Independence Movement (MINH), a smaller organization. Gallisá became active in a radio program of political discussion.

== Legacy ==
The PSP militancy left a legacy that contributed to change Puerto Rican culture. A wider general consciousness of class and race divisions, and of the contradictions between the state and the social and popular interests still exists in Puerto Rico, largely as a result of the PSP's public influence in the 1970s and 80s. Protest and patriotic singers, literary authors and graphic artists whose works became popular by means of socialist recording and editorial production, spectacles, book shops, local publications, demonstrations and rallies, later on have gained general recognition, thus strengthening Puerto Rican national identity and popular culture.

Activities defiant to authorities and demanding rights now common among the island's poor and in the Puerto Rican community in New York and other urban areas of the US, were made popular by the MPI and PSP. The tradition among the general public to set up pickets, street rallies, protest strikes and mass demonstrations also comes largely from the influence of the PSP and the other anticolonial and socialist groups. The new social and cultural space created back then has continued to the present in different forms, despite the crisis of the left. The spreading of the ideas that Puerto Rico is a distinct nation and the present political system is a colonial one, is largely due to the PSP. Claridad, which became a daily newspaper between 1974 and 1977, cleared the way for incisive journalism revealing scandals of corruption and links between private interests and the island's government, and reporting on the problems and claims of the downtrodden and the poor.

== Recent events ==
Claridad continues to be published as a weekly newspaper, though it has a limited circulation and is no longer the news and research paper it was in the 1960s through the 1980s.

On May 5, 2007, at Hostos Community College in the Bronx, NY, former members of the PSP, now working under the name of the "October 27 Committee", held a small conference titled "Desde Las Entrañas, 30 Years Later: Implications for the Independence Movement." Desde Las Entrañas was the political declaration of the First Congress of the United States Branch of the Puerto Rican Socialist Party, approved on April 1, 1973. This 77-page document examined "the nature of Puerto Rican immigration to this country; its present composition, its attitudes and behavior, its experience within the system of exploitation imposed by the ruling class of this country, the relationship between its working class and the exploited countries of the Third World, the super-exploited sectors of this country and their role; the nature of national liberation struggles and their relation to the class struggles of the United States working class; the future that this system assigns to our youth and, finally, the present situation of the left in the United States." (1976 translation) Organized by José "Che" Velázquez, speakers at this 2007 conference included Andrés Torres, Raquel Rivera, and Angelo Falcón.
