= Timeline of sovereigntism in Puerto Rico (1970s–1990s) =

During the last decades of the 20th century, the concept of sovereign free association was mostly promoted by members of the liberal wing of the Popular Democratic Party (PPD). During the 1990s, the option first appeared in a ballot as part of the second political status referendum held during the Pedro Rosselló administration.

== Within the PPD ==
=== Cordero Santiago; Liberales vs. Hernández Colón ===
On November 19, 1970, the Central Council of the PPD issued what became known as the Pronunciamiento de Aguas Buenas (lit. "Aguas Buenas Pronnouncement") which stated its support for a "complete self-government, founded in the free association with the United States and which permits and supports the country's cultural personality and the sustained development of its social and material progress." However throughout the 1970s, conservative governor Hernández Colón ambiguously used the term "free association" when referring to the territorial Commonwealth, which was promoted to the PPD's base as an "Freely Associated State" (in a literal translation of Estado Libre Asociado). This lack of clarity extended beyond Puerto Rico, in a presentation before the UN's Ad Hoc Committee in 1974, he stated that "Geographically Puerto Rico is part of the Caribbean. While culturally being part of the Hispano-American communities. In political and economic terms, it is associated to the United States. These points, but especially the free association status, define the international role of Puerto Rico."

In 1975, a bilateral Ad Hoc Committee organized to discuss the potential development of the Commonwealth presented a proposal known as El Nuevo Pacto, which supported the creation of a Free Associated State based on the sovereignty of Puerto Rico, with the purpose of living in a permanent association that was "mutually satisfactory and fair". In 1976, Francisco Aponte Pérez founded PROELA, which became the first free association organization affiliated to the PPD. Aponte Pérez described the concept as "a way to obtain a fine equilibrium that allows [Puerto Rico] to retain its characteristics as a country and grants it vinculation without surrender". The final interview ever granted by Muñoz was published by El Mundo on July 25, 1978. In it, he gives his final posture regarding the status, noting that "if Puerto Rico had gained its independence from Spain and would have approached the United States to join them, in an autonomous union, with only a minimum of powers being renounced to accomplish that union, that would be a good definition for a developed autonominity." On September 13, 1978, the UN's Decolonization Committee issued a resolution recognizing the viability of free association to solve the status of Puerto Rico. Under the presidency of Carlos Romero Barceló, the PNP published a booklet titled El ABC de la estadidad (lit. "The ABC of Statehood") which defined free association as an "Associated Republic", claiming that it defied "all Federal laws, agencies, jurisdiction and appointments" and that it asked for block funding so that "[the PPD] could take their share as they want". By using the word "Republic", the PNP intended to link the concept to independence, an option that they were in turn linking to the Soviet Union and other communist countries.

Rafael Cordero Santiago's grave

On January 29, 1985, the Commission for the Study of Puerto Rico's Constitutional Development of the Bar Association of Puerto Rico studied the free association compacts of Marshall Islands and the Federated States of Micronesia. The group determined that those compacts could be modified to adjust to Puerto Rico's case. On April 11, 1989, senator Marco Antonio Rigau officially presented a free association proposal to the PPD's Government Board (Spanish: Junta de Gobierno). On April 24, 1989, Hernández Colón dismissed the project, claiming that it did not represent the Board's position nor his own in a press conference held at La Fortaleza. Within the PPD, the project's opposers accused Rigau of forcing a form of independence or "associated republic". The president of the PR House of Representatives, conservative Rony Jarabo, echoed Hernández Colón and supported his position that the party had already approved the territorial Commonwealth by approving the governor's proposal in the party's Government Programme.

Rigau asked the conservative leadership to analyze the content with neutrality and defended his project, claiming that it was well thought, taking five years to draft and that it received a warm reception in Washington. Hernández Colón led the Board's consideration of the proposal on April 30, 1989, presenting his own proposal supporting a territorial development of the Commonwealth, which pursued a form of "permanent union" with the United States. The day before, Hernández Colón had participated in a reunion along other members of the party's conservative wing, during which he shredded the copy of the free association project that was provided to him, also ordering a veto on Rigau's intentions to individually seek supporters in Washington. In a subsequent interview with José Delgado, Hernández Colón dismissed the existence of a liberal wing within the PPD, claiming that there were only a "few liberal feathers" led by a group of "young attorneys". The proposal was publicly endorsed by PR House of Representatives Vice President Samuel Ramírez, PPD Youth Organization President Cirilo Tirado and representatives Carlos Vizcarrondo, Luis E. Cabán and Víctor Negrón. Antonio Fernós López-Cepero, Jr. was also a key figure in its promotion. Supporting Hernández Colón's position of a territorial development were Eudaldo Báez Galib, Antonio Colorado, Victoria Muñoz, Jaime Fuster, Sergio Peña Clós and Presby Santiago. PR Rep. Severo Colberg Ramírez publicly endorsed it, but voted along the conservative leadership in the Board. By alienating the liberal voters, the governor opted to ignore the fact that the PPD's gubernatorial races of 1980 and 1984 had received a significant support from non-affiliated left-wing voters, who played a key role despite the PNP employing the use of terms such as "separatist alliance" to associate them to the independence movement.

To further complicate matters, the PIP took a proposal to Congress that would create a temporary "Associated Republic", which was actually a proposal of independence combined with a collaboration treaty between parts. Caught in the middle of this division, the General Council of the PPD approved a definition for the "new Commonwealth" on November 17, 1990, which established that the development had to take place outside the territorial clause of the United States's constitution. This was the result of an amendment proposed by Carlos Vizcarrondo, which became known as La Enmienda Vizcarrondo. Hernández Colón presented a proposal of further development for the Commonwealth within the territorial clause which failed to gather support in the United States Congress, but which was passed on to failed gubernatorial candidate Victoria Muñoz Mendoza. In 1993, Ponce mayor Rafael Cordero Santiago began displaying his support for a non territorial development of the status issue, managing to get a timid pro-sovereignty support in the definition of the Commonwealth approved for a status referendum despite the conservative postures of the PPD leadership. This was accompanied by a series of actions where he supported the collaboration of the liberal wing of the PPD and factions of the independence movement, the first of them being Marcha del Idioma Español (lit. "March for the Spanish Language") which opposed Pedro Rosselló's proposal to adopt English as an official language. Cordero became involved in several cooperative initiatives, and efforts done between 1994 and 1996 concluded in La Nación en Marcha (lit. "The Nation Marching"), a multi-sectorial protest that boycotted a meeting between American governors and members of the PNP.

=== Status Commission, 1998 referendum ===
In 1997, following the failed campaign of conservative Héctor Luis Acevedo for the governorship, PR Rep. Aníbal Acevedo Vilá became the president of the PPD. Under his leadership a Status Commission was created, with William Miranda Marín serving as its president. PR Sen. José Ortiz-Daliot, a known supporter of free association, was named Executive Director of the PPD's Status Commission. The entity held public hearings to gauge the ideological tendencies of the party's base. During the process, the liberals were pleasantly surprised, discovering that despite the conservative message promoted throughout the previous decades, the party's base was notably more liberal than the political class. On March 15, 1997, the PPD's Youth Organization held a reunion with several older figures within the party, among which was Acevedo Vilá. There a new proposal for the development of the Commonwealth was drafted, which reclaimed the retention of Puerto Rico's sovereignty and established the need for a "bilateral pact of permanent association" between both parts. In 1997, US Rep. Don Young introduced status bill H.R. 856 that became known as the "Young Project". The proposal included a two-step referendum listing two categories "options within the United States sovereignty" (subdivided into statehood and the pre-existent territorial Commonwealth) and "options within a separate sovereignty for Puerto Rico" (subdivided into free association and independence). However, the language used by Young was criticized as being akin to the pro-statehood faction.

The use of the word "separate" being linked to "separatist", an adjective commonly used in a derogatory manner by the PNP. The fact that the representative publicly used the term "independent free association", referencing independence, contributed to the figures that linked him to the pro-statehood movement. The PPD decided to lobby against the bill. On April 21, 1997, PROELA (through its vice-president Angel Ortiz Guzmán) issued a letter to Young in support of sovereign free association, proposing the retention of several key elements and arguing that only a "Commonwealth in full free association" should be included in the referendum. The bill ultimately failed to advance in Congress. On July 11, 1998, Acevedo Vilá traveled to a hearing in Washington, where he argued his support for a development based on sovereignty that was "non colonial, non territorial" but also retained the use of the United States Citizenship. Two weeks later, during the Anniversary of the Constitution, he publicly supported that the development of the Commonwealth could only be viable through the elimination of the territorial clause. Acevedo Vilá expressed that Puerto Rico was "ready to employ the power to commerce with other countries, develop politics that support its economic growth and be able to reach international agreements [...] including the capacity to be a member of regional and international organizations", calling this a step that would "take [Puerto Rico] not to the left or right, but forward".

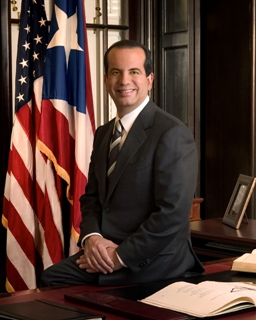
Aníbal Acevedo Vilá

On October 15, 1998, the PPD's Government Board adopted a proposal based on reclaiming the sovereignty. Despite being unrefined, this marked the first time that a non-territorial formula became the institutional position of the PPD. Mayors Cordero Santiago, Miranda Marín (Caguas) and José Aponte de la Torre (Carolina) were instrumental in the adoption of this definition. However, the following months brought internal controversy between the members of the free association movement within the PPD due to a second status referendum being organized by the Rosselló administration. The older leaders decided to avoid testing their newly adopted definition in a PNP-mechanism without the time for it to become widely accepted, instead supporting a vote for the "None of the above" option. However, the younger members of the faction, including Luis Vega Ramos, Jorge Colberg Toro and Néstor Duprey, decided to request the $500,000 assigned to defend the definition of free association included in it, despite not entirely agreeing with the conditions included. Angel Ortiz Guzmán decided to contest the definition of free association, but was unable to derail the process. In the end, most liberals within the PPD fell in line with the official position and voted for "None of the above". While "free association" only gathered 4,536 votes, it still fared favorably against the "territorial Commonwealth" option, which only received 993 votes.

Afterwards, the intervention of Cordero Santiago prevented disciplinary sanctions against the group that promoted the "free association" option. Despite conservative Sila Calderón becoming the PPD's candidate for governor, the proposal itself was included in the party's platform prior to the 2000 general elections. Despite belonging to the party's right wing, she defied that faction's proposal to place José Alfredo Hernández Mayoral, Hernández Colón's eldest son, as the candidate to the position of Resident Commissioner. Instead, she promoted Acevedo Víla to fill the role, also blocking his original intention to become the president of the PR House of Representatives. Acevedo Víla went on to defeat Hernández Mayoral by 12% in the subsequent primaries. The PPD won both positions in the general elections. Both branches of the legislature were controlled by liberals, with Antonio Fas Alzamora becoming the PR Senate's president and Vizcarrondo the PR House of Representatives' speaker. However, Calderón avoided the status issue throughout her term, citing that economic issues were a priority for her administration.

== Other movements and activism ==
From his position of Law Professor Antonio Fernós López-Cepero, Jr. followed in the footsteps of his father, making his own proposals for a free association compact, among which was the elimination of the "colonial position" once occupied by his father, the Resident Commissioner. His defense of free association and constant critics to the conservative interpretation of his father's work by figures such as Rafael Hernández Colón, earned him the tongue-in-cheek nickname "high priest of soberanismo" from José Alfredo Hernández Mayoral. Among the independent voices that proposed a concept of free association was, Enrique Vázquez Quintana, who argued in his proposal that a concept based on the legendary round table should be established, with representation from the governments of Puerto Rico and the United States as well as a single representative from the United Nations. In 1997, noting the perception that the status debate was not advancing within the PPD, he proposed the creation of a new party, Partido por la Libre Asociación (lit. "Party for Free Association"), to directly promote free association. The initiative turned into the Partido Acción Civil (lit. "Civil Action Party"), which dropped the status from its platform, aborting the initiative. Ricardo Alegría, a fervent supporter of independence and culture, noted that he would be willing to temporarily support free association in this meant abolishing the territorial clause. Juan Mari Brás, expressed a similar position, claiming that while it is not independence, free association is flexible and "is not a one way street like statehood".
