= César Andreu Iglesias =

American novelist

- Born: July 31, 1915; Ponce, Puerto Rico
- Died: April 17, 1976 (aged 60); San Juan, Puerto Rico
- Occupations: Political activist; labor organizer; journalist; novelist; short story writer
- Spouse: Jane Speed
- Children: Nicolás Andreu Speed
- Writing career
- Literary movement: Independentista

César Andreu Iglesias (July 31, 1915 – April 17, 1976) was a Puerto Rican political activist, labor organizer, journalist, novelist, and short story writer.

== Early years ==
Andreu Iglesias was born in Ponce, Puerto Rico, on July 31, 1915.

== Independentista activities ==
Along with Juan Mari Brás, Andreu Iglesias was the founder of the Claridad news weekly. He also served as president of the Puerto Rican Communist Party, and the recipient of the 1960 Award for Excellence in Journalism from the Puerto Rican Institute of Literature. "Andreu was at the very forefront of socialist and independentista movements in Puerto Rico. He was a tireless organizer, a creative editor, and a speaker on the history of the labor movement in Puerto Rico."

== Political activism ==
Andreu Iglesias was constantly preoccupied, as a writer and journalist as well as through his civil acts, with the issue of social injustice. He was a man of firm political convictions which brought him to found, with Mari Bras, the weekly Claridad.

While less known for his theatrical plays, Andreu Iglesias also brought his political views and literary interest to theater in Puerto Rico. His theatrical production El inciso hache received an award from the Puerto Rican Athenaeum.

== Personal life and death ==
Andreu Iglesias married Jane Speed, activist and former proprietor of a progressive bookstore in Birmingham, Alabama.

Andreu Iglesias died in San Juan on April 17, 1976. Was buried at the Puerto Rico Memorial Cemetery in Carolina, Puerto Rico

== Books by Andreu Iglesias ==
The following are books written by Andreu Iglesias:

- Los derrotados (English translation, The Vanquished, by Sidney Mintz, 1956)
- The Vanquished (a novel, 1956)
- Una gota de tiempo (1948)
- El derrumbe (1960)

== Honors ==
Andreu Iglesias was one of Ponce's most accomplished journalists. He is honored at Ponce's Park of Illustrious Ponce Citizens for his contributions to that field.

== See also ==
- List of Latin American writers
- List of Puerto Rican writers
- List of Puerto Ricans
- Puerto Rican literature
- Multi-Ethnic Literature of the United States
