= Elliott Castro =

Puerto Rican sports commentator and sports historian

Elliott Castro Tirado (February 17, 1949 – July 23, 2017) was a Santurce, San Juan, Puerto Rico-born sports commentator, color commentator, sports historian and author. Castro was a commentator in major sports events in Puerto Rico as well as those related to Puerto Rican athletes such as the Olympics, the Pan American Games, and the Central American and Caribbean Games.

Castro wrote several accounts of sports in Puerto Rico. One of them he co-authored with Carmen Lidin and is titled Listos!: Puerto Rico En El Deporte Internacional (1930–2004) (English: Ready!: Puerto Rico in International Sports (1930–2004)).

On July 23, 2017, Elliott Castro Tirado died of a heart attack in Bayamón, Puerto Rico. The February (22–25) 2018 edition of the "Festival de Claridad", a festival produced by an independent, Puerto Rican independence advocating newspaper of the same name, was dedicated to him for his importance in the world of journalism.

== See also ==
- List of Puerto Ricans
- Norman H. Davila - Castro's broadcasting partner and friend
