= Loida Figueroa Mercado =

Puerto Rican historian (1917–1996)

- Born: October 6, 1917; Yauco, Puerto Rico
- Died: December 14, 1996 (aged 79); Río Piedras, Puerto Rico
- Occupations: historian, writer, educator
- Years active: 1942–1996
- Notable work: Breve historia de Puerto Rico, 3 volumes 1968–1977

Loida Figueroa Mercado (October 6, 1917 – December 14, 1996) was an Afro-Puerto Rican intellectual who was a member of the mid-twentieth century movement known as the Generation of the 50s. She was one of the founders of the Puerto Rican Socialist Party's Pro-Independence Movement (MPI) and a prominent member of the Central Committee of the party. After being asked to teach a course on Puerto Rican history and discovering there were no textbooks for students to study, she wrote a three volume history of the island, which is considered her most important work. She also wrote several texts questioning the methodology historians used to develop social histories of Caribbean nations. She was awarded the National Cultural Medal by the Cuban Ministry of Culture in 1996.

== Early life ==
Figueroa was born on October 6, 1917, in Yauco, Puerto Rico, to Emetria Mercado and Agustín Figueroa. Her father was a sugarcane cutter and coffee worker. Her mother served as a domestic and though neither had a formal education, they both urged their children to attend school and were knowledgeable about the island's history. She was raised in a household composed of a half-brother, Juan Arroyo Mercado; three sisters Priscilla, Rachel and Elsie; and a foster sister, Sonia Vélez.

Figueroa completed her primary schooling at the Yauco Elementary School, completing eighth grade in 1931. Because her father became ill and was unable to work, she left school at that time and began working as a needleworker. After two years, she returned to her education, entering the Escuela Superior de Yauco (High School of Yauco), intent on becoming a nurse. Graduating as the class Salutatorian in 1936, she entered the Instituto Politécnico de San Germán and later that same year, on December 31, 1936, she married Julio Cesar Flores. The couple decided that her schooling should take priority, and Figueroa took up residence in the female dormitory. She had to work to put herself through school, holding a variety of jobs at the school including babysitting the teacher's children; working in the kitchen and dining room; tutoring; and assisting with the institution's poultry farm. When she became pregnant with her first daughter, Eunice Flores Figueroa, the school forced her to leave, but she returned the following semester, graduating magna cum laude with her class in 1941.

== Career ==
Figueroa began teaching in 1942, as an elementary school teacher in Fajardo of English and French languages, as well as Puerto Rican and United States history. She shifted to high school, working in Guánica between 1942 and 1957. In 1947 and again in 1955, she served as acting school principal. Her first marriage ended in divorce and on December 25, 1944, she married Ismael Olivieri. The couple subsequently had two daughters, Antonia and Rebeca Olivieri Figueroa. In 1947, she published her first book of poetry Acridulces, which was described by critics as neo-Romantic, but which placed her within the first generation of academic and professional Puerto Ricans known as the Generation of the 50s. The groups' works tend to focus on the rapid urbanization going on in Puerto Rico during the 1950s and the concern that cultural heritage was being supplanted by Americanization. After her divorce from Olivieri, Figueroa married José Nelson Castro Vega, with whom she had her last daughter, Avaris Castro Figueroa. The couple would also divorce.

While still working as a teacher, she earned a master's degree from Columbia University in New York City, in the Faculty of Political Sciences in 1952. Her dissertation was titled The Development of Political Consciousness in Puerto Rico during the 19th Century. In 1957, she began teaching at the University of Puerto Rico, Mayagüez Campus and while living in Mayagüez became one of the founders of the Puerto Rican Socialist Party (PSP)'s Pro-Independence Movement (MPI) in 1959. Joining the central committee of the Puerto Rican Socialist Party, she became very active in the movement to gain independence from the United States. As an Afro–Puerto Rican woman, a radical socialist, and nationalist, she openly criticized the government, leading to police surveillance. Figueroa's second book, Arenales, was published in 1961. A novel, the book evaluates the social problems, such as colonialism, gender violence and machismo, labor exploitation, poverty and racism, which existed in Central Guánica, Puerto Rico's largest sugar factory and an iconic symbol of American imperialism. In 1963, Figueroa graduated with her PhD in history from the Central University of Madrid with her thesis Puerto Rico ante la oferta de las Leyes Especiales por España (Puerto Rico before the application of the Special Laws of Spain).

Figueroa published her Breve historia de Puerto Rico: Desde sus comienzos hasta 1800 (Brief History of Puerto Rico: From its beginnings to 1800) in two volumes. The first was published 1968 and the second in 1969, after being asked to teach a course on Puerto Rican history and finding that there were no textbooks for students to study. In 1971, she moved to New York and taught as a visiting scholar at Lehman College and the City College, both within the City University of New York system. In 1972 Figueroa published, in English, the History of Puerto Rico from the Beginning to 1892, which incorporated both Spanish volumes into one book. That same year, Tres puntos claves: Lares, idioma, soberanía (Three Key Points: Homes, language, sovereignty), which discussed Puerto Rican nationalism, was published. In 1974, she retired from the University of Puerto Rico and moved to New York City. She was hired to teach the Puerto Rican Studies program at Brooklyn College, which had been founded in 1971, but a change in the administration around the time of her arrival imposed restrictions about course materials that she opposed. In 1975, she published Historiografía de Puerto Rico (Historiography of Puerto Rico), which challenged the accepted methods used by historians to evaluate the linguistic and social history of the island. Figueroa joined students in protesting the curtailment of autonomy for the program and after a two-year battle, they won their fight.

In 1977, Figueroa published the third volume in the series Breve Historia, Breve historia de Puerto Rico: Desde el crepúsculo del dominio español hasta la antesala de la Ley Foraker, c. 1892–1900 (Brief history of Puerto Rico: From the twilight of Spanish rule to the forerunner of the Foraker Law, c. 1892 – 1900), which evaluated the invasion of the island by Europeans and later, the Americans. The volumes are her most important work, giving a history of the island, incorporating her doctoral research. The first two volumes cover the period up to the American intervention in the 1890s on the island and the last volume discusses the turbulent period when Spain and the United States were struggling for control. She continued teaching at Brooklyn until her retirement in 1977. In 1979, Figueroa published El caso de Puerto Rico a nivel internacional (The Case of Puerto Rico at the International Level), which analyzed the liberation movement beginning in 1948 and the response of the United Nations.

In 1980, Figueroa, who had returned to Puerto Rico, ran as a mayoral candidate for the city of Mayagüez. She continued publishing, with works such as El papel histórico y social de la mujer en el Caribe Hispánico (The Historical and Social Role of Women in the Hispanic Caribbean, 1982) and coauthored Hostos (Hosts), a series of essays with Cuban writer Emilio Godínez Sosa in 1987 and Aspectos de la cuestión nacional en Puerto Rico (Aspects of the nationalism question in Puerto Rico) with James Morris Blaut of the University of Chicago in 1988. After her retirement, Figueroa traveled widely promoting Puerto Rican independence. At the time of her death, she was working on a forth volume of Breve Historia covering the period from 1900 to 1921 in Puerto Rico's history. She was awarded the National Cultural Medal by the Cuban Ministry of Culture for her historiographical work on the relationship between the two Antillean nations in 1996, shortly before her death.

== Death and legacy ==
Figueroa died on December 14, 1996, in Río Piedras, Puerto Rico, and was buried in Los Cipreses Memorial Park, in Bayamón, Puerto Rico. Her papers are housed at the University of Puerto Rico, Río Piedras Campus and she is widely remembered in Puerto Rico. In 2017, celebrations occurred throughout the island for the centenary of her birth.
