= Hostosian National Independence Movement =

Pro-independence organization (and unregistered political party) in Puerto Rico

Hostosian National Independence Movement Movimiento Independentista Nacional Hostosiano
- Leader: Néstor Nazario Trabal
- Founded: April 6, 2004; 22 years ago
- Merger of: National Hostosian Congress; New Puerto Rican Independence Movement
- Headquarters: San Juan, Puerto Rico
- Newspaper: Red Betances
- Youth wing: Juventud Hostosiano
- Ideology: Left-wing nationalism Puerto Rican independence
- Political position: Left-wing
- Regional affiliation: São Paulo Forum
- International affiliation: Non-Aligned Movement (observer)

Website
- minhpuertorico.org redbetances.com

The Hostosian National Independence Movement (Spanish: Movimiento Independentista Nacional Hostosiano, MINH) is a political organization in Puerto Rico. In 2015, Julio Muriente was its leader.

== History ==
The MINH was formed on May 6, 2004, by a merger of the National Hostosian Congress (CNH) and the New Puerto Rican Independence Movement (NMIP). The two groups that formed the MINH were organizational descendants of the Puerto Rican Socialist Party (PSP). The organization's name and ideology are based on the tradition of Eugenio María de Hostos, a historical independence advocate. The official organ of the MINH is Red Betances and the newspaper "El Hostosiano".

It was an organizational observer of the Non-Aligned Movement.

== Organization ==
As of 2017 Héctor Pesquera was one of its co-presidents.

The organization also reportedly has a "radical youth wing".

== Recent Events ==
In 2015 they stated (through their spokesperson Héctor Pesquera) Puerto Rican independence protests, saying "...it’s been a long time since an event for independence was so successful."

In 2016, MINH (via Wilma Reverón) denounced the collection of DNA samples from 3 independentist militants.

== See also ==
- Puerto Rican Independence Party (PIP)
