= Delaware's 16th Senate district =

American legislative district

Delaware's 16th State Senate district
Senator
Eric Buckson; R–Dover
- Registration: 39.6% Democratic; 32.8% Republican; 27.5% No party preference
- Demographics: 64% White; 21% Black; 7% Hispanic; 3% Asian; 5% Other
- Population (2018): 46,941
- Registered voters: 31,738

Delaware's 16th Senate district is one of 21 districts in the Delaware Senate. It has been represented by Republican Eric Buckson since 2022.

== Geography ==
District 16 covers southern Dover and its suburbs in Kent County, including Highland Acres, Rising Sun-Lebanon, Kent Acres, Riverview, Magnolia, Woodside, Woodside East, Frederica, Little Creek, Bowers, and Little Heaven.

Like all districts in the state, the 16th Senate district is located entirely within Delaware's at-large congressional district. It overlaps with the 28th, 29th, 32nd, 33rd, and 34th districts of the Delaware House of Representatives.

== Recent election results ==
Delaware Senators are elected to staggered four-year terms. Under normal circumstances, the 16th district holds elections in midterm years, except immediately after redistricting, when all seats are up for election regardless of usual cycle.

=== 2024 ===
Delaware Senate 16th district general election, 2024
Party	Candidate	Votes	%
Republican	Eric Buckson (incumbent)	16,094	98.89%
Non-Partisan Delaware	Will McVay	181	1.11%
Total votes		16,275	100%
Republican hold			

=== 2022 ===
Delaware Senate 16th district general election, 2022
Party	Candidate	Votes	%
Republican	Eric Buckson	9,577	100%
Total votes		9,577	100%
Republican hold			

=== 2018 ===
2018 Delaware Senate election, District 16
Party	Candidate	Votes	%
Republican	Colin Bonini (incumbent)	8,618	55.1
Democratic	Louisa Phillips	7,027	44.9
Total votes		15,645	100
Republican hold			

=== 2014 ===
2014 Delaware Senate election, District 16
Party	Candidate	Votes	%
Republican	Colin Bonini (incumbent)	6,178	74.3
Independent	Michael Tedesco	2,135	25.7
Total votes		8,313	100
Republican hold			

=== 2012 ===
2012 Delaware Senate election, District 16
Party	Candidate	Votes	%
Republican	Colin Bonini (incumbent)	9,372	79.9
Independent	Michael Tedesco	2,356	20.1
Total votes		11,728	100
Republican hold			

=== Federal and statewide results ===
Year	Office	Results
2020	President	Biden 49.8 – 48.5%
2016	President	Trump 52.0 – 42.4%
2014	Senate	Wade 53.2 – 45.2%
2012	President	Romney 50.2 – 48.5%
2012	Senate	Carper 58.3 – 36.8%
2012	Governor	Markell 58.9 – 38.6%
