= 2016 Delaware gubernatorial election =

- November 8, 2016
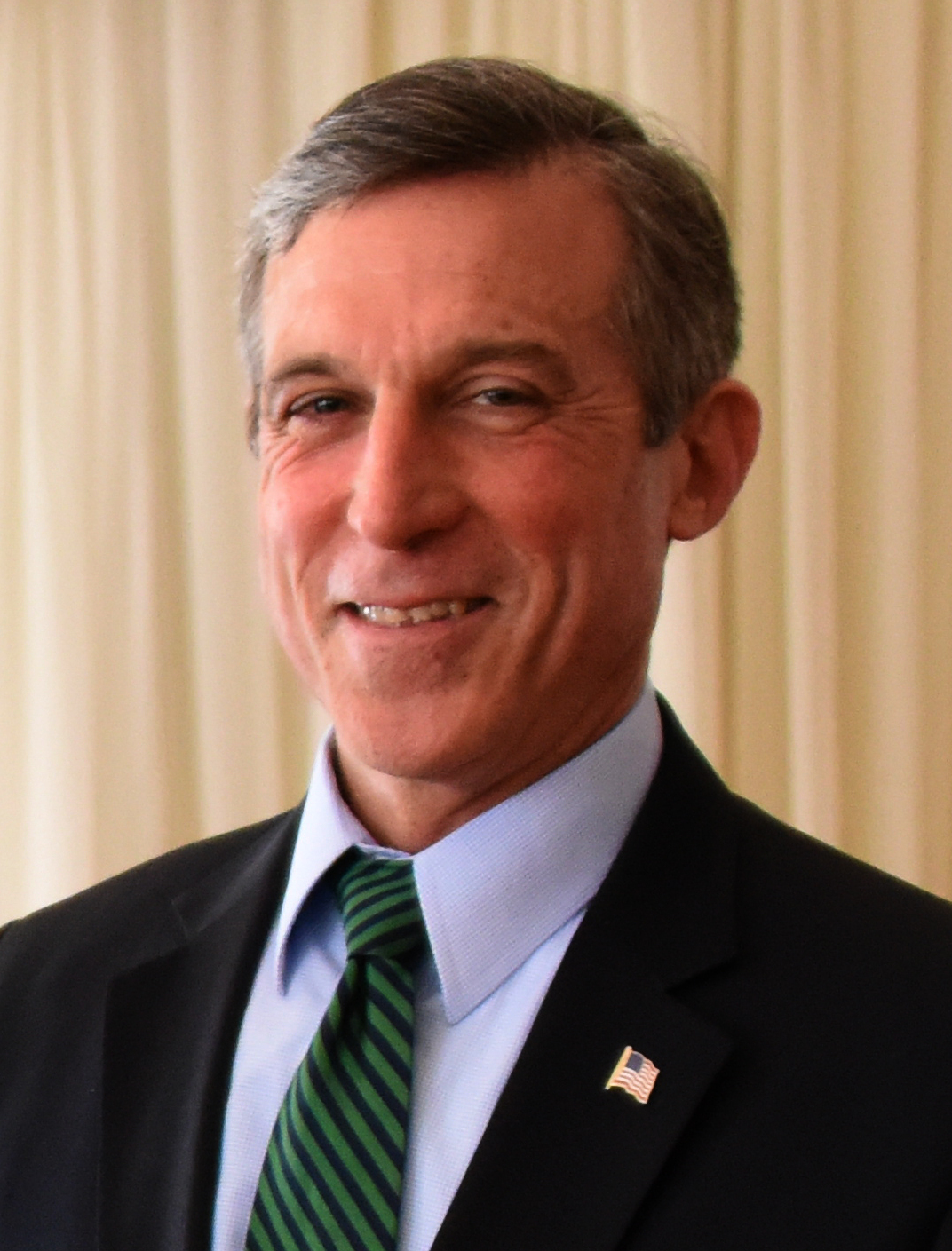

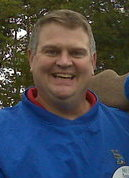
Nominee	John Carney	Colin Bonini
Party	Democratic	Republican
Popular vote	248,404	166,852
Percentage	58.34%	39.18%
- Carney: 40–50% 50–60% 60–70% 70–80% 80–90% >90% Bonini: 40–50% 50–60% 60–70% 70–80% No votes
Governor before election
Jack Markell
Democratic
Elected Governor
John Carney
Democratic

The 2016 Delaware gubernatorial election took place on November 8, 2016, to elect the governor of Delaware, concurrently with the 2016 U.S. presidential election, as well as elections to the United States Senate in other states and elections to the United States House of Representatives and various state and local elections.

Incumbent Democratic governor Jack Markell was term-limited and could not run for re-election to a third term in office. Democratic congressman John Carney defeated Republican state senator Colin Bonini in a landslide. Despite his loss, Bonini flipped Sussex County back to the Republicans for the first time in a gubernatorial election since 2004.

== Democratic primary ==
=== Candidates ===
==== Nominee ====
- John Carney, U.S. representative, former lieutenant governor of Delaware and candidate for governor in 2008

==== Deceased ====
- Beau Biden, former Delaware Attorney General and son of Delaware senator, vice president, and future president Joe Biden (died May 30, 2015)

==== Withdrew ====
- Kevin Tinsley

==== Declined ====
- Matthew Denn, Delaware Attorney General and former lieutenant governor of Delaware
- Thomas P. Gordon, county executive of New Castle County
- John Kowalko, state representative
- Peter Schwartzkopf, Speaker of the Delaware House of Representatives
- Bryan Townsend, state senator (running for Delaware's at-large seat in Congress)

=== Polling ===
Poll source	Date(s) administered	Sample size	Margin of error	John Carney	Other	Undecided
Fairleigh Dickinson/Delaware News Journal	July 20–24, 2016	344	± 5.3%	67%	9%	23%

== Republican primary ==
=== Candidates ===
==== Nominee ====
- Colin Bonini, state senator and nominee for State Treasurer in 2010

==== Eliminated in primary ====
- Lacey Lafferty, retired state trooper

==== Declined ====
- Greg Lavelle, state senator and Minority Whip of the Delaware Senate
- Alan Levin, director of the Delaware Economic Development Office and former president and CEO of Happy Harry's
- Michael Ramone, state representative
- Daniel Short, Minority Leader of the Delaware House of Representatives
- Ken Simpler, State Treasurer of Delaware

=== Polling ===
Poll source	Date(s) administered	Sample size	Margin of error	Colin Bonini	Lacey Lafferty	Other	Undecided
Fairleigh Dickinson/Delaware News Journal	July 20–24, 2016	224	± 6.6%	29%	22%	3%	42%

=== Results ===
Results by county: Bonini—70–80% Bonini—60–70%

Republican primary results
Party	Candidate	Votes	%
Republican	Colin Bonini	21,150	69.88
Republican	Lacey Lafferty	9,115	30.12
Total votes		30,265	100.00

== Libertarian Party ==
=== Candidates ===
==== Declared ====
- Sean Louis Goward

== General election ==
=== Debates ===
- Complete video of debate, October 19, 2016 - C-SPAN

=== Predictions ===
Source	Ranking	As of
The Cook Political Report	Safe D	August 12, 2016
Daily Kos	Safe D	November 8, 2016
Rothenberg Political Report	Safe D	November 3, 2016
Sabato's Crystal Ball	Safe D	November 7, 2016
Real Clear Politics	Safe D	November 1, 2016
Governing	Safe D	October 27, 2016

=== Polling ===
Poll source	Date(s) administered	Sample size	Margin of error	John Carney (D)	Colin Bonini (R)	Other	Undecided
SurveyMonkey	November 1–7, 2016	367	± 4.6%	56%	40%	—	4%
SurveyMonkey	October 31–November 6, 2016	383	± 4.6%	54%	42%	—	4%
SurveyMonkey	October 28–November 3, 2016	405	± 4.6%	56%	40%	—	4%
SurveyMonkey	October 27–November 2, 2016	397	± 4.6%	56%	39%	—	5%
SurveyMonkey	October 26–November 1, 2016	413	± 4.6%	58%	37%	—	5%
SurveyMonkey	October 25–31, 2016	458	± 4.6%	60%	36%	—	4%
University of Delaware	September 16–28, 2016	900	± 3.8%	57%	25%	7%	11%

=== Results ===
Delaware gubernatorial election, 2016
Party	Candidate	Votes	%	±%
Democratic	John Carney	248,404	58.34%	−10.99%
Republican	Colin Bonini	166,852	39.18%	+10.59%
Green	Andrew Groff	5,951	1.39%	+0.24%
Libertarian	Sean Louis Goward	4,577	1.09%	+0.17%
Total votes		425,784	100.00%	N/A
Democratic hold				

==== By county ====
By county

County	John Carney Democratic		Colin Bonini Republican		All Others	
County	#	%	#	%	#	%
Kent	35,955	49.68	34,777	48.05	1,646	2.27
New Castle	165,973	66.21	77,839	31.05	6,879	2.75
Sussex	46,476	45.24	54,236	52.79	2,031	1.97
Totals	248,404	58.34	166,852	39.18	10,556	2.48

Counties that flipped from Democratic to Republican

- Sussex (largest city: Seaford)
