= 2016 United States House of Representatives elections =

House elections for the 115th U.S. Congress

- November 8, 2016

All 435 seats in the United States House of Representatives (Note: As well as the 6 non-voting delegates.) 218 seats needed for a majority
- Turnout: 54.7% ▲18.3 pp
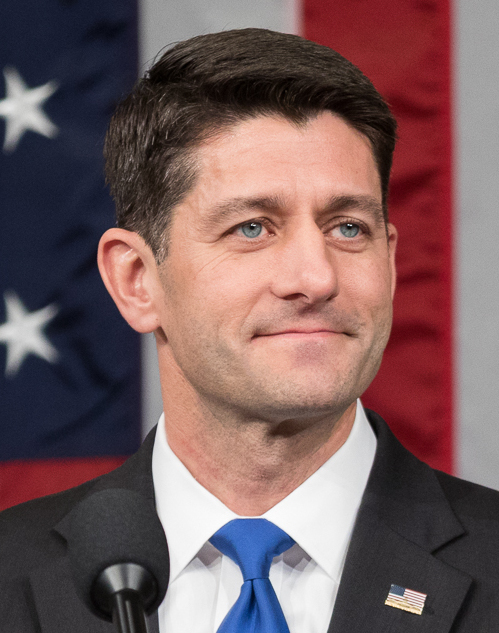

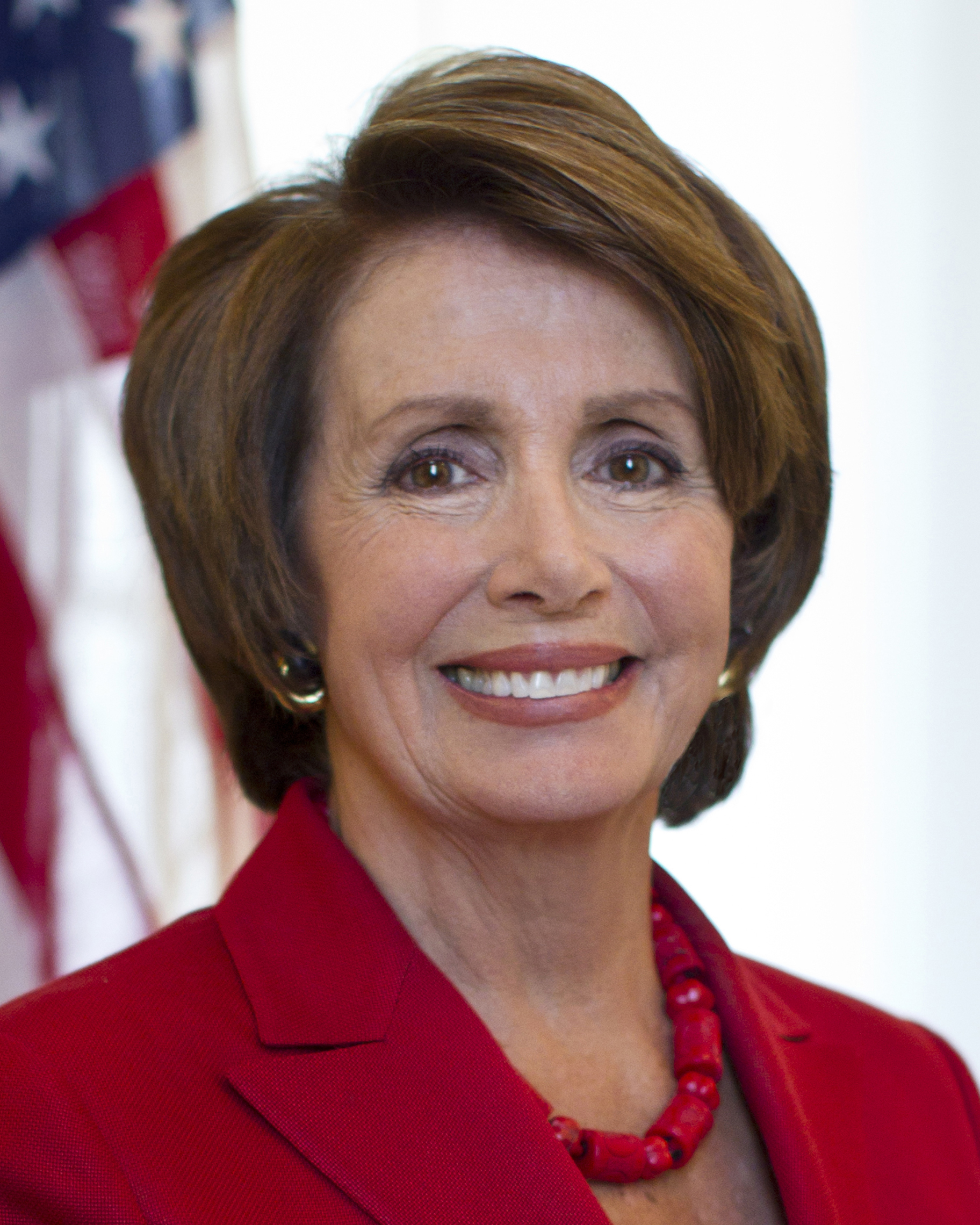
	Majority party	Minority party
Leader	Paul Ryan	Nancy Pelosi
Party	Republican	Democratic
Leader since	October 29, 2015	January 3, 2003
Leader's seat	Wisconsin 1st	California 12th
Last election	247 seats, 51.2%	188 seats, 45.5%
Seats won	241	194
Seat change	▼6	▲6
Popular vote	62,772,225	61,417,454
Percentage	48.3%	47.3%
Swing	▼2.9pp	▲1.8pp
- Results: Democratic hold Democratic gain Republican hold Republican gain
Speaker before election
Paul Ryan
Republican
Elected Speaker
Paul Ryan
Republican

The 2016 United States House of Representatives elections were held on November 8, 2016, to elect representatives for all 435 congressional districts across each of the 50 U.S. states to the 115th United States Congress. Non-voting members for the District of Columbia and territories of the United States were also elected. These elections coincided with the election of President Donald Trump, although his party lost seats in both chambers of Congress. The winners of this election served in the 115th Congress, with seats apportioned among the states based on the 2010 United States census. In October 2015, the House elected a new Speaker, Republican Paul Ryan, who was re-elected in the new term. Democrat Nancy Pelosi continued to lead her party as Minority Leader. Elections were also held on the same day for the U.S. Senate, many governors, and other state and local elections.

Democrats gained six seats in this election, although Republicans narrowly won the popular vote and won a 241–194 majority. Republicans suffered net losses in both houses of Congress, despite winning the presidency, a first for either party since 2000. This was also the first election since 2000 in which the winning presidential party lost House seats.

This is the last time Republicans won a majority of seats in Colorado and Virginia, and the last time Republicans won every House seat in Kansas. Neither party would win a bigger House majority until 2026. This is also the last time that either party has held the house for longer than two terms in a row.

== Results summary ==
=== Federal ===
Source: "Election Statistics – Office of the Clerk". Note: does not include blank and over/under votes which were included in the official results.

↓
241	194
Republican	Democratic

Parties	Seats				Popular vote		
Parties	2014	2016	Net change	Strength	Vote	%	Change
Republican Party	247	241	▼6	55.4%	62,772,225	48.3%	-2.9pp
Democratic Party	188	194	▲6	44.6%	61,417,454	47.3%	+1.8pp
Libertarian Party	—	—	—	—	1,660,923	1.3%	+0.1pp
Independent	—	—	—	—	870,167	0.7%	-0.1pp
Green Party	—	—	—	—	501,135	0.4%	+0.1pp
Constitution Party	—	—	—	—	76,089	0.1%	–
Others	—	—	—	—	2,412,788	1.9%	+1.3pp
Write-ins	—	—	—	—	122,469	0.1%	+1.3pp
Totals	435	435	0	100.0%	129,833,250	100.0%	—
Source: Election Statistics – Office of the Clerk

=== Per state ===
State	Total seats	Democratic		Republican	
State	Total seats	Seats	Change	Seats	Change
Alabama	7	1	Steady	6	Steady
Alaska	1	0	Steady	1	Steady
Arizona	9	4	Steady	5	Steady
Arkansas	4	0	Steady	4	Steady
California	53	39	Steady	14	Steady
Colorado	7	3	Steady	4	Steady
Connecticut	5	5	Steady	0	Steady
Delaware	1	1	Steady	0	Steady
Florida	27	11	▲1	16	▼1
Georgia	14	4	Steady	10	Steady
Hawaii	2	2	Steady	0	Steady
Idaho	2	0	Steady	2	Steady
Illinois	18	11	▲1	7	▼1
Indiana	9	2	Steady	7	Steady
Iowa	4	1	Steady	3	Steady
Kansas	4	0	Steady	4	Steady
Kentucky	6	1	Steady	5	Steady
Louisiana	6	1	Steady	5	Steady
Maine	2	1	Steady	1	Steady
Maryland	8	7	Steady	1	Steady
Massachusetts	9	9	Steady	0	Steady
Michigan	14	5	Steady	9	Steady
Minnesota	8	5	Steady	3	Steady
Mississippi	4	1	Steady	3	Steady
Missouri	8	2	Steady	6	Steady
Montana	1	0	Steady	1	Steady
Nebraska	3	0	▼1	3	▲1
Nevada	4	3	▲2	1	▼2
New Hampshire	2	2	▲1	0	▼1
New Jersey	12	7	▲1	5	▼1
New Mexico	3	2	Steady	1	Steady
New York	27	18	Steady	9	Steady
North Carolina	13	3	Steady	10	Steady
North Dakota	1	0	Steady	1	Steady
Ohio	16	4	Steady	12	Steady
Oklahoma	5	0	Steady	5	Steady
Oregon	5	4	Steady	1	Steady
Pennsylvania	18	5	Steady	13	Steady
Rhode Island	2	2	Steady	0	Steady
South Carolina	7	1	Steady	6	Steady
South Dakota	1	0	Steady	1	Steady
Tennessee	9	2	Steady	7	Steady
Texas	36	11	Steady	25	Steady
Utah	4	0	Steady	4	Steady
Vermont	1	1	Steady	0	Steady
Virginia	11	4	▲1	7	▼1
Washington	10	6	Steady	4	Steady
West Virginia	3	0	Steady	3	Steady
Wisconsin	8	3	Steady	5	Steady
Wyoming	1	0	Steady	1	Steady
Total	435	194	▲6	241	▼6

Popular vote
Republican	49.12%
Democratic	48.02%
Libertarian	1.29%
Green	0.38%
Other	1.19%

House seats
Republican	55.40%
Democratic	44.60%

=== Maps ===
Results shaded according to winning candidate's share of vote

Popular vote by state

House votes by party holding plurality in state
Democratic; 100% 80-99% 70-79% 60-69% 51-59% 50%	Republican; 100% 80-99% 70-79% 60-69% 51-59% 50%

== Retiring incumbents ==
Retiring incumbents by district Democratic incumbent ran Democratic incumbent retired or lost renomination Republican incumbent ran Republican incumbent retired or lost renomination Vacant or new district

Forty-two representatives declined to seek re-election in 2016, divided into eighteen Democrats and twenty-four Republicans.

=== Democrats ===
Eighteen Democrats retired.

1. Arizona 1: Ann Kirkpatrick retired to run for the U.S. Senate.
2. California 20: Sam Farr retired.
3. California 24: Lois Capps retired.
4. California 44: Janice Hahn retired to run for the Los Angeles County Board of Supervisors.
5. California 46: Loretta Sanchez retired to run for the U.S. Senate.
6. Delaware at-large: John Carney retired to run for governor of Delaware.
7. Florida 2: Gwen Graham retired.
8. Florida 9: Alan Grayson retired to run for the U.S. Senate.
9. Florida 18: Patrick Murphy retired to run for the U.S. Senate.
10. Hawaii 1: Mark Takai died July 20, 2016, having already announced his planned retirement.
11. Illinois 8: Tammy Duckworth retired to run for the U.S. Senate.
12. Maryland 4: Donna Edwards retired to run for the U.S. Senate.
13. Maryland 8: Chris Van Hollen retired to run for the U.S. Senate.
14. New York 3: Steve Israel retired.
15. New York 13: Charles Rangel retired.
16. Puerto Rico at-large: Pedro Pierluisi retired to run for governor of Puerto Rico.
17. Texas 15: Rubén Hinojosa retired.
18. Washington 7: Jim McDermott retired.

=== Republicans ===
Twenty-five Republicans retired.

1. Arizona 5: Matt Salmon retired.
2. Florida 1: Jeff Miller retired.
3. Florida 4: Ander Crenshaw retired.
4. Florida 11: Rich Nugent retired.
5. Florida 19: Curt Clawson retired.
6. Georgia 3: Lynn Westmoreland retired.
7. Indiana 3: Marlin Stutzman retired to run for the U.S. Senate.
8. Indiana 9: Todd Young retired to run for the U.S. Senate.
9. Kentucky 1: Ed Whitfield resigned September 6, 2016, having previously announced his planned retirement.
10. Louisiana 3: Charles Boustany retired to run for the U.S. Senate.
11. Louisiana 4: John Fleming retired to run for the U.S. Senate.
12. Michigan 1: Dan Benishek retired.
13. Michigan 10: Candice Miller retired.
14. Minnesota 2: John Kline retired.
15. Nevada 3: Joe Heck retired to run for the U.S. Senate.
16. New York 19: Chris Gibson retired.
17. New York 22: Richard Hanna retired.
18. Pennsylvania 8: Mike Fitzpatrick retired.
19. Pennsylvania 16: Joe Pitts retired.
20. Tennessee 8: Stephen Fincher retired.
21. Texas 19: Randy Neugebauer retired.
22. Virginia 2: Scott Rigell retired.
23. Virginia 5: Robert Hurt retired.
24. Wisconsin 8: Reid Ribble retired.
25. Wyoming at-large: Cynthia Lummis retired.

== Incumbents defeated ==
=== In primary elections ===
==== Democrats ====
1. Florida 5: Corrine Brown lost renomination to Al Lawson; the 5th district was redrawn in 2016 due to a court order.
2. Pennsylvania 2: Chaka Fattah lost renomination to Dwight E. Evans, and subsequently resigned on June 23, 2016.

==== Republicans ====
1. Kansas 1: Tim Huelskamp lost renomination to Roger Marshall.
2. North Carolina 2: Renee Ellmers lost renomination to fellow incumbent George Holding after court-ordered redistricting forced them into the same district.
3. Virginia 2: Randy Forbes lost renomination to Scott Taylor after running in a new district following court-ordered redistricting.

=== In the general election ===
The Democrats had a net gain of five seats, taken from Republicans.

==== Democrats ====
One Democrat lost re-election to a fellow Democrat.

1. California 17: Mike Honda lost to Ro Khanna.

One Democrat lost re-election to a Republican.

1. Nebraska 2: Brad Ashford lost to Don Bacon.

==== Republicans ====
Six Republicans lost re-election to Democrats.

1. Florida 7: John Mica lost to Stephanie Murphy.
2. Florida 13: David Jolly lost to Charlie Crist.
3. Illinois 10: Bob Dold lost to Brad Schneider.
4. Nevada 4: Cresent Hardy lost to Ruben Kihuen.
5. New Hampshire 1: Frank Guinta lost to Carol Shea-Porter.
6. New Jersey 5: Scott Garrett lost to Josh Gottheimer.

== Open seats that changed parties ==
Democrats had a net gain of one seat in which the incumbent was not on the ballot.

=== Democratic seats ===
One open seat was lost.

1. Florida 18: Patrick Murphy (D) retired to run for Senate. Seat won by Brian Mast (R).

One open seat was lost as a result of redistricting.

1. Florida 2: Gwen Graham (D) retired. Seat won by Neal Dunn (R).

=== Republican seats ===
One open seat was lost.

1. Nevada 3: Joe Heck (R) retired to run for Senate. Seat won by Jacky Rosen. (D).

Two open seats were lost as a result of redistricting.

1. Florida 10: Daniel Webster (R) instead ran in the 11th district. Seat won by Val Demings (D).
2. Virginia 4: J. Randy Forbes (R) instead ran in the 2nd district. Seat won by Don McEachin (D).

== Closest races ==
Thirty-five races were decided by 10% or lower.

District	Winner	Margin
California 49th	Republican	0.52%
Minnesota 8th	Democratic	0.56%
Minnesota 1st	Democratic	0.76%
Nebraska 2nd	Republican (flip)	1.20%
Nevada 3rd	Democratic (flip)	1.27%
Texas 23rd	Republican	1.33%
New Hampshire 1st	Democratic (flip)	1.34%
Puerto Rico at-large	Republican (flip)	1.60%
Minnesota 2nd	Republican	1.80%
California 7th	Democratic	2.34%
Florida 7th	Democratic (flip)	2.96%
California 10th	Republican	3.40%
Florida 13th	Democratic (flip)	3.81%
Nevada 4th	Democratic (flip)	4.01%
California 44th	Democratic	4.39%
New Jersey 5th	Democratic (flip)	4.41%
New Hampshire 2nd	Democratic	4.42%
Minnesota 7th	Democratic	5.03%
Illinois 10th	Democratic (flip)	5.21%
New York 22nd	Republican	5.45%
New York 3rd	Democratic	5.73%
Virginia 10th	Republican	5.77%
California 25th	Republican	6.26%
California 24th	Democratic	6.84%
Arizona 1st	Democratic	7.29%
Iowa 2nd	Democratic	7.47%
Pennsylvania 17th	Democratic	7.61%
Iowa 1st	Republican	7.66%
Guam at-large	Democratic	7.98%
Alabama 2nd	Republican	8.24%
Colorado 6th	Republican	8.30%
New York 19th	Republican	8.56%
Pennsylvania 8th	Republican	8.85%
Maine 2nd	Republican	9.60%
Florida 27th	Republican	9.79%

Texas's 7th was the tipping point seat.

== Primary dates ==
This table shows the primary dates for regularly scheduled elections. It also shows the type of primary. In an "open" primary, any registered voter can vote in any party's primary. In a "closed" primary, only voters registered with a specific party can vote in that party's primary. In a "top-two" primary, all candidates run against each other regardless of party affiliation, and the top two candidates advance to the second round of voting (in Louisiana, a candidate can win the election by winning a majority of the vote in the first round). All of the various other primary types are classified as "hybrid." Alaska in 2008 provides one example of a hybrid primary: the Democratic Party allowed unaffiliated voters to vote in its primary, while the Republican Party only allowed party members to vote in its primary.

State	Date	Type
Alabama	March 1^{R}	Open
Arkansas	March 1^{R}	Open
Texas	March 1^{R}	Open
Mississippi	March 8	Hybrid
Illinois	March 15	Hybrid
North Carolina	March 15	Hybrid
Ohio	March 15	Hybrid
Maryland	April 26	Hybrid
Pennsylvania	April 26	Hybrid
Indiana	May 3	Hybrid
Nebraska	May 10	Hybrid
West Virginia	May 10	Hybrid
Idaho	May 17	Hybrid
Kentucky	May 17	Closed
Oregon	May 17	Hybrid
Georgia	May 24^{R}	Open
California	June 7	Top-two
Iowa	June 7	Hybrid
Montana	June 7	Open
New Jersey	June 7	Closed
New Mexico	June 7	Closed
North Carolina	June 7	Hybrid
South Dakota	June 7^{R}	Hybrid
Nevada	June 14	Closed
North Dakota	June 14	Open
South Carolina	June 14^{R}	Hybrid
Virginia	June 14	Hybrid
Colorado	June 28	Hybrid
New York	June 28	Closed
Oklahoma	June 28^{R}	Hybrid
Utah	June 28	Hybrid
Kansas	Aug 2	Closed
Michigan	Aug 2	Open
Missouri	Aug 2	Open
Washington	Aug 2	Top-two
Tennessee	Aug 4	Hybrid
Connecticut	Aug 9	Hybrid
Minnesota	Aug 9	Open
Vermont	Aug 9	Open
Wisconsin	Aug 9	Open
Hawaii	Aug 13	Open
Alaska	Aug 16	Hybrid
Wyoming	Aug 16	Closed
Arizona	Aug 30	Hybrid
Florida	Aug 30	Closed
Massachusetts	Sep 8	Hybrid
Delaware	Sep 13	Closed
New Hampshire	Sep 13	Hybrid
Rhode Island	Sep 13	Hybrid
Louisiana	Nov 8	Top-two

^{R}Indicates a state that requires primary run-off elections under certain conditions.

== Special elections ==
These elections were for the remainder of the term ending January 3, 2017. Sorted by date, then by state, then by district.

District	Incumbent			This race	
District	Member	Party	First elected	Results	Candidates
Ohio 8	John Boehner	Republican	1990	Incumbent resigned October 31, 2015. New member elected June 7, 2016. Republican hold.	▌ ✓ Warren Davidson (Republican) 76.8%; ▌Corey Foister (Democratic) 21.1%; ▌James J. Condit Jr. (Green) 2.2%
Pennsylvania 2	Chaka Fattah	Democratic	1994	Incumbent resigned June 23, 2016, after being convicted on 23 counts of federal corruption charges. New member elected November 8, 2016. Winner was also elected to the next term, see below. Democratic hold.	▌ ✓ Dwight Evans (Democratic) 90.2%; ▌James Jones (Republican) 9.8%
Hawaii 1	Mark Takai	Democratic	2014	Incumbent died July 20, 2016. New member elected November 8, 2016. Winner was also elected to the next term, see below. Democratic hold.	▌ ✓ Colleen Hanabusa (Democratic) 60.5%; ▌Shirlene DelaCruz Ostrov (Republican) 20.6%; Other candidates 18.9%
Kentucky 1	Ed Whitfield	Republican	1994	Incumbent resigned September 6, 2016. New member elected November 8, 2016. Winner was also elected to the next term, see below. Republican hold.	▌ ✓ James Comer (Republican) 72.2%; ▌Samuel L. Gaskins (Democratic) 27.8%

== Alabama ==
District		Incumbent			This race	
Location	PVI	Member	Party	First elected	Results	Candidates
Alabama 1	R+15	Bradley Byrne	Republican	2013	Incumbent re-elected.	▌ ✓ Bradley Byrne (Republican) 96.4%
Alabama 2	R+17	Martha Roby	Republican	2010	Incumbent re-elected.	▌ ✓ Martha Roby (Republican) 48.8%; ▌Nathan Mathis (Democratic) 40.5%
Alabama 3	R+16	Mike D. Rogers	Republican	2002	Incumbent re-elected.	▌ ✓ Mike D. Rogers (Republican) 66.9%; ▌Jesse Smith (Democratic) 32.9%
Alabama 4	R+28	Robert Aderholt	Republican	1996	Incumbent re-elected.	▌ ✓ Robert Aderholt (Republican) 98.5%
Alabama 5	R+17	Mo Brooks	Republican	2010	Incumbent re-elected.	▌ ✓ Mo Brooks (Republican) 66.7%; ▌Will Boyd (Democratic) 33.2%
Alabama 6	R+28	Gary Palmer	Republican	2014	Incumbent re-elected.	▌ ✓ Gary Palmer (Republican) 74.5%; ▌David Putman (Democratic) 25.4%
Alabama 7	D+20	Terri Sewell	Democratic	2010	Incumbent re-elected.	▌ ✓ Terri Sewell (Democratic) 98.4%

== Alaska ==
District		Incumbent			This race	
Location	PVI	Member	Party	First elected	Results	Candidates
Alaska at-large	R+12	Don Young	Republican	1973 (Special)	Incumbent re-elected.	▌ ✓ Don Young (Republican) 50.3%; ▌Steve Lindbeck (Democratic) 36.0%; ▌Jim C. McDermott (Libertarian) 10.3%; ▌Bernie Souphanavong (Independent) 3.0%

== Arizona ==
District		Incumbent			This race	
Location	PVI	Member	Party	First elected	Results	Candidates
Arizona 1	R+4	Ann Kirkpatrick	Democratic	2008; 2010 (defeated); 2012	Incumbent retired to run for U.S. Senator. Democratic hold.	▌ ✓ Tom O'Halleran (Democratic) 50.7%; ▌Paul Babeu (Republican) 43.4%; ▌Ray Parrish (Green) 6.0%
Arizona 2	R+3	Martha McSally	Republican	2014	Incumbent re-elected.	▌ ✓ Martha McSally (Republican) 57.0%; ▌Matt Heinz (Democratic) 43.0%
Arizona 3	D+8	Raúl Grijalva	Democratic	2002	Incumbent re-elected.	▌ ✓ Raúl Grijalva (Democratic) 98.6%
Arizona 4	R+20	Paul Gosar	Republican	2010	Incumbent re-elected.	▌ ✓ Paul Gosar (Republican) 71.5%; ▌Mikel Weisser (Democratic) 28.5%
Arizona 5	R+17	Matt Salmon	Republican	1994; 2000 (retired); 2012	Incumbent retired. Republican hold.	▌ ✓ Andy Biggs (Republican) 64.1%; ▌Talia Fuentes (Democratic) 35.9%
Arizona 6	R+12	David Schweikert	Republican	2010	Incumbent re-elected.	▌ ✓ David Schweikert (Republican) 62.1%; ▌John Williamson (Democratic) 37.9%
Arizona 7	D+16	Ruben Gallego	Democratic	2014	Incumbent re-elected.	▌ ✓ Ruben Gallego (Democratic) 75.2%; ▌Eve Nunez (Republican) 24.7%
Arizona 8	R+15	Trent Franks	Republican	2002	Incumbent re-elected.	▌ ✓ Trent Franks (Republican) 68.5%; ▌Mark Salazar (Green) 31.43%
Arizona 9	R+1	Kyrsten Sinema	Democratic	2012	Incumbent re-elected.	▌ ✓ Kyrsten Sinema (Democratic) 60.9%; ▌Dave Giles (Republican) 39.1%

== Arkansas ==
District		Incumbent			This race	
Location	PVI	Member	Party	First elected	Results	Candidates
Arkansas 1	R+14	Rick Crawford	Republican	2010	Incumbent re-elected.	▌ ✓ Rick Crawford (Republican) 76.3%; ▌Mark West (Libertarian) 23.7%
Arkansas 2	R+8	French Hill	Republican	2014	Incumbent re-elected.	▌ ✓ French Hill (Republican) 58.4%; ▌Dianne Curry (Democratic) 36.8%; ▌Chris Hayes (Libertarian) 4.7%
Arkansas 3	R+19	Steve Womack	Republican	2010	Incumbent re-elected.	▌ ✓ Steve Womack (Republican) 77.3%; ▌Steve Isaacson (Libertarian) 22.7%
Arkansas 4	R+15	Bruce Westerman	Republican	2014	Incumbent re-elected.	▌ ✓ Bruce Westerman (Republican) 74.9%; ▌Kerry Hicks (Libertarian) 25.1%

== California ==
District		Incumbent			This race	
Location	PVI	Member	Party	First elected	Results	Candidates
California 1	R+10	Doug LaMalfa	Republican	2012	Incumbent re-elected.	▌ ✓ Doug LaMalfa (Republican) 59.1% ▌Jim Reed (Democratic) 40.9%
California 2	D+20	Jared Huffman	Democratic	2012	Incumbent re-elected.	▌ ✓ Jared Huffman (Democratic) 76.9% ▌Dale Mensing (Republican) 23.1%
California 3	D+3	John Garamendi	Democratic	2009	Incumbent re-elected.	▌ ✓ John Garamendi (Democratic) 59.4% ▌Eugene Cleek (Republican) 40.6%
California 4	R+10	Tom McClintock	Republican	2008	Incumbent re-elected.	▌ ✓ Tom McClintock (Republican) 62.7% ▌Bob Derlet (Democratic) 37.3%
California 5	D+19	Mike Thompson	Democratic	1998	Incumbent re-elected.	▌ ✓ Mike Thompson (Democratic) 76.9% ▌Carlos Santamaria (Republican) 23.1%
California 6	D+18	Doris Matsui	Democratic	2005	Incumbent re-elected.	▌ ✓ Doris Matsui (Democratic) 75.4% ▌Bob Evans (Republican) 24.6%
California 7	EVEN	Ami Bera	Democratic	2012	Incumbent re-elected.	▌ ✓ Ami Bera (Democratic) 51.2% ▌Scott Jones (Republican) 48.8%
California 8	R+10	Paul Cook	Republican	2012	Incumbent re-elected.	▌ ✓ Paul Cook (Republican) 62.3% ▌Rita Ramirez (Democratic) 37.7%
California 9	D+6	Jerry McNerney	Democratic	2006	Incumbent re-elected.	▌ ✓ Jerry McNerney (Democratic) 57.4% ▌Tony Amador (Republican) 42.6%
California 10	R+1	Jeff Denham	Republican	2010	Incumbent re-elected.	▌ ✓ Jeff Denham (Republican) 51.7% ▌Michael Eggman (Democratic) 48.3%
California 11	D+17	Mark DeSaulnier	Democratic	2014	Incumbent re-elected.	▌ ✓ Mark DeSaulnier (Democratic) 72.1% ▌Roger Allen Petersen (Republican) 27.9%
California 12	D+34	Nancy Pelosi	Democratic	1987	Incumbent re-elected.	▌ ✓ Nancy Pelosi (Democratic) 80.9% ▌Preston Picus (No Party Preference) 19.1%
California 13	D+37	Barbara Lee	Democratic	1998	Incumbent re-elected.	▌ ✓ Barbara Lee (Democratic) 90.8% ▌Sue Caro (Republican) 9.2%
California 14	D+23	Jackie Speier	Democratic	2008	Incumbent re-elected.	▌ ✓ Jackie Speier (Democratic) 80.9% ▌Angel Cardenas (Republican) 19.1%
California 15	D+16	Eric Swalwell	Democratic	2012	Incumbent re-elected.	▌ ✓ Eric Swalwell (Democratic) 73.8% ▌Danny Turner (Republican) 26.2%
California 16	D+7	Jim Costa	Democratic	2004	Incumbent re-elected.	▌ ✓ Jim Costa (Democratic) 58.0% ▌Johnny Tacherra (Republican) 42.0%
California 17	D+20	Mike Honda	Democratic	2000	Incumbent lost re-election. Democratic hold.	▌ ✓ Ro Khanna (Democratic) 61.0% ▌Mike Honda (Democratic) 39.0%
California 18	D+18	Anna Eshoo	Democratic	1992	Incumbent re-elected.	▌ ✓ Anna Eshoo (Democratic) 71.1% ▌Richard B. Fox (Republican) 28.9%
California 19	D+19	Zoe Lofgren	Democratic	1994	Incumbent re-elected.	▌ ✓ Zoe Lofgren (Democratic) 73.9% ▌G. Burt Lancaster (Republican) 26.1%
California 20	D+21	Sam Farr	Democratic	1993	Incumbent retired. Democratic hold.	▌ ✓ Jimmy Panetta (Democratic) 70.8% ▌Casey Lucius (Republican) 29.2%
California 21	D+2	David Valadao	Republican	2012	Incumbent re-elected.	▌ ✓ David Valadao (Republican) 56.7% ▌Emilio Huerta (Democratic) 43.3%
California 22	R+10	Devin Nunes	Republican	2002	Incumbent re-elected.	▌ ✓ Devin Nunes (Republican) 67.6% ▌Louie Campos (Democratic) 32.4%
California 23	R+16	Kevin McCarthy	Republican	2006	Incumbent re-elected.	▌ ✓ Kevin McCarthy (Republican) 69.2% ▌Wendy Reed (Democratic) 30.8%
California 24	D+4	Lois Capps	Democratic	1998	Incumbent retired. Democratic hold.	▌ ✓ Salud Carbajal (Democratic) 53.4% ▌Justin Fareed (Republican) 46.6%
California 25	R+3	Steve Knight	Republican	2014	Incumbent re-elected.	▌ ✓ Steve Knight (Republican) 53.1% ▌Bryan Caforio (Democratic) 46.9%
California 26	D+4	Julia Brownley	Democratic	2012	Incumbent re-elected.	▌ ✓ Julia Brownley (Democratic) 60.4% ▌Rafael Dagnesses (Republican) 39.6%
California 27	D+11	Judy Chu	Democratic	2009	Incumbent re-elected.	▌ ✓ Judy Chu (Democratic) 67.4% ▌Jack Orswell (Republican) 32.6%
California 28	D+20	Adam Schiff	Democratic	2000	Incumbent re-elected.	▌ ✓ Adam Schiff (Democratic) 78.0% ▌Lenore Solis (Republican) 22.0%
California 29	D+25	Tony Cárdenas	Democratic	2012	Incumbent re-elected.	▌ ✓ Tony Cárdenas (Democratic) 74.7% ▌Richard Alarcon (Democratic) 25.3%
California 30	D+14	Brad Sherman	Democratic	1996	Incumbent re-elected.	▌ ✓ Brad Sherman (Democratic) 72.6% ▌Mark Reed (Republican) 27.4%
California 31	D+5	Pete Aguilar	Democratic	2014	Incumbent re-elected.	▌ ✓ Pete Aguilar (Democratic) 56.1% ▌Paul Chabot (Republican) 43.9%
California 32	D+12	Grace Napolitano	Democratic	1998	Incumbent re-elected.	▌ ✓ Grace Napolitano (Democratic) 61.6% ▌Roger Hernandez (Democratic) 38.4%
California 33	D+11	Ted Lieu	Democratic	2014	Incumbent re-elected.	▌ ✓ Ted Lieu (Democratic) 66.4% ▌Kenneth Wright (Republican) 33.6%
California 34	D+30	Xavier Becerra	Democratic	1992	Incumbent re-elected.	▌ ✓ Xavier Becerra (Democratic) 77.2% ▌Adrienne Edwards (Democratic) 22.8%
California 35	D+15	Norma Torres	Democratic	2014	Incumbent re-elected.	▌ ✓ Norma Torres (Democratic) 72.4% ▌Tyler Fischella (Republican) 27.6%
California 36	R+1	Raul Ruiz	Democratic	2012	Incumbent re-elected.	▌ ✓ Raul Ruiz (Democratic) 62.1% ▌Jeff Stone (Republican) 37.9%
California 37	D+34	Karen Bass	Democratic	2010	Incumbent re-elected.	▌ ✓ Karen Bass (Democratic) 81.1% ▌Chris Wiggins (Democratic) 18.9%
California 38	D+12	Linda Sánchez	Democratic	2002	Incumbent re-elected.	▌ ✓ Linda Sánchez (Democratic) 70.5% ▌Ryan Downing (Republican) 29.5%
California 39	R+5	Ed Royce	Republican	1992	Incumbent re-elected.	▌ ✓ Ed Royce (Republican) 57.2% ▌Brett Murdock (Democratic) 42.8%
California 40	D+29	Lucille Roybal-Allard	Democratic	1992	Incumbent re-elected.	▌ ✓ Lucille Roybal-Allard (Democratic) 71.4% ▌Roman Gabriel Gonzalez (No Party Preference) 28.6%
California 41	D+9	Mark Takano	Democratic	2012	Incumbent re-elected.	▌ ✓ Mark Takano (Democratic) 65.0% ▌Doug Shepherd (Republican) 35.0%
California 42	R+10	Ken Calvert	Republican	1992	Incumbent re-elected.	▌ ✓ Ken Calvert (Republican) 58.8% ▌Tim Sheridan (Democratic) 41.2%
California 43	D+26	Maxine Waters	Democratic	1990	Incumbent re-elected.	▌ ✓ Maxine Waters (Democratic) 76.1% ▌Omar Navarro (Republican) 23.9%
California 44	D+32	Janice Hahn	Democratic	2011	Incumbent retired to run for the Los Angeles County Board of Supervisors. Democratic hold.	▌ ✓ Nanette Barragán (Democratic) 52.2% ▌Isadore Hall III (Democratic) 47.8%
California 45	R+7	Mimi Walters	Republican	2014	Incumbent re-elected.	▌ ✓ Mimi Walters (Republican) 58.6% ▌Ron Varasteh (Democratic) 41.4%
California 46	D+9	Loretta Sanchez	Democratic	1996	Incumbent retired to run for U.S. Senator. Democratic hold.	▌ ✓ Lou Correa (Democratic) 70.0% ▌Bao Nguyen (Democratic) 30.0%
California 47	D+8	Alan Lowenthal	Democratic	2012	Incumbent re-elected.	▌ ✓ Alan Lowenthal (Democratic) 63.7% ▌Andy Whallon (Republican) 36.3%
California 48	R+7	Dana Rohrabacher	Republican	1988	Incumbent re-elected.	▌ ✓ Dana Rohrabacher (Republican) 58.3% ▌Suzanne Savary (Democratic) 41.7%
California 49	R+4	Darrell Issa	Republican	2000	Incumbent re-elected.	▌ ✓ Darrell Issa (Republican) 50.3% ▌Doug Applegate (Democratic) 49.7%
California 50	R+14	Duncan D. Hunter	Republican	2008	Incumbent re-elected.	▌ ✓ Duncan D. Hunter (Republican) 63.5% ▌Patrick Malloy (Democratic) 36.5%
California 51	D+16	Juan Vargas	Democratic	2012	Incumbent re-elected.	▌ ✓ Juan Vargas (Democratic) 72.8% ▌Juan Hidalgo Jr. (Republican) 27.2%
California 52	D+2	Scott Peters	Democratic	2012	Incumbent re-elected.	▌ ✓ Scott Peters (Democratic) 56.5% ▌Denise Gitsham (Republican) 43.5%
California 53	D+10	Susan Davis	Democratic	2000	Incumbent re-elected.	▌ ✓ Susan Davis (Democratic) 67.0% ▌James Veltmeyer (Republican) 33.0%

== Colorado ==
District		Incumbent			This race	
Location	PVI	Member	Party	First elected	Results	Candidates
Colorado 1	D+18	Diana DeGette	Democratic	1996	Incumbent re-elected.	▌ ✓ Diana DeGette (Democratic) 67.9%; ▌Casper Stockham (Republican) 27.7%; ▌Darrell Dinges (Libertarian) 4.4%
Colorado 2	D+8	Jared Polis	Democratic	2008	Incumbent re-elected.	▌ ✓ Jared Polis (Democratic) 56.9%; ▌Nic Morse (Republican) 37.2%; ▌Richard Longstreth (Libertarian) 5.9%
Colorado 3	R+5	Scott Tipton	Republican	2010	Incumbent re-elected.	▌ ✓ Scott Tipton (Republican) 54.6%; ▌Gail Schwartz (Democratic) 40.4%; ▌Gaylon Kent (Libertarian) 5.0%
Colorado 4	R+11	Ken Buck	Republican	2014	Incumbent re-elected.	▌ ✓ Ken Buck (Republican) 63.6%; ▌Bob Seay (Democratic) 31.5%; ▌Bruce Griffith (Libertarian) 4.8%
Colorado 5	R+13	Doug Lamborn	Republican	2006	Incumbent re-elected.	▌ ✓ Doug Lamborn (Republican) 62.3%; ▌Misty Plowright (Democratic) 30.8%; ▌Mike McRedmond (Libertarian) 6.9%
Colorado 6	D+1	Mike Coffman	Republican	2008	Incumbent re-elected.	▌ ✓ Mike Coffman (Republican) 50.9%; ▌Morgan Carroll (Democratic) 42.6%; ▌Norm Olsen (Libertarian) 5.0%; ▌Robert Lee Worthey (Green) 1.5%
Colorado 7	D+5	Ed Perlmutter	Democratic	2006	Incumbent re-elected.	▌ ✓ Ed Perlmutter (Democratic) 55.2%; ▌George Athanasopoulos (Republican) 39.8%; ▌Martin Buchanan (Libertarian) 5.0%

== Connecticut ==
District		Incumbent			This race	
Location	PVI	Member	Party	First elected	Results	Candidates
Connecticut 1	D+13	John B. Larson	Democratic	1998	Incumbent re-elected.	▌ ✓ John B. Larson (Democratic) 64.1%; ▌Matthew Corey (Republican) 33.8%; ▌Mike DeRosa (Green) 2.11%
Connecticut 2	D+5	Joe Courtney	Democratic	2006	Incumbent re-elected.	▌ ✓ Joe Courtney (Democratic) 63.2%; ▌Daria Novak (Republican) 33.7%; ▌Jonathan Pelto (Green) 1.6%; ▌Dan Reale (Libertarian) 1.5%
Connecticut 3	D+11	Rosa DeLauro	Democratic	1990	Incumbent re-elected.	▌ ✓ Rosa DeLauro (Democratic) 69.0%; ▌Angel Cadena (Republican) 31.0%
Connecticut 4	D+5	Jim Himes	Democratic	2008	Incumbent re-elected.	▌ ✓ Jim Himes (Democratic) 59.9%; ▌John Shaban (Republican) 40.1%
Connecticut 5	D+3	Elizabeth Esty	Democratic	2012	Incumbent re-elected.	▌ ✓ Elizabeth Esty (Democratic) 58.0%; ▌Clay Cope (Republican) 42.0%

== Delaware ==
District		Incumbent			This race	
Location	PVI	Member	Party	First elected	Results	Candidates
Delaware at-large	D+8	John Carney	Democratic	2010	Incumbent retired to run for Governor. Democratic hold.	▌ ✓ Lisa Blunt Rochester (Democratic) 55.5%; ▌Hans Reigle (Republican) 41.0%; ▌Mark Perri (Green) 2.0%; ▌Scott Gesty (Libertarian) 1.5%

== Florida ==
District		Incumbent			This race	
Location	PVI	Member	Party	First elected	Results	Candidates
Florida 1	R+22	Jeff Miller	Republican	2001	Incumbent retired. Republican hold.	▌ ✓ Matt Gaetz (Republican) 69.1%; ▌Steven Specht (Democratic) 30.9%
Florida 2	R+18	Gwen Graham	Democratic	2014	Incumbent retired. Republican gain.	▌ ✓ Neal Dunn (Republican) 67.3%; ▌Walter Dartland (Democratic) 29.9%; ▌Rob Lapham (Libertarian) 2.7%
Florida 3	R+9	Ted Yoho	Republican	2012	Incumbent re-elected.	▌ ✓ Ted Yoho (Republican) 56.6%; ▌Ken McGurn (Democratic) 39.8%; ▌Tom Wells (Independent) 3.7%
Florida 4	R+19	Ander Crenshaw	Republican	2000	Incumbent retired. Republican hold.	▌ ✓ John Rutherford (Republican) 70.2%; ▌David E. Bruderly (Democratic) 27.6%; ▌Gary L. Koniz (Independent) 2.2%
Florida 5	D+12	Corrine Brown	Democratic	1992	Incumbent lost renomination. Democratic hold.	▌ ✓ Al Lawson (Democratic) 64.2%; ▌Glo Smith (Republican) 35.8%
Florida 6	R+4	Ron DeSantis	Republican	2012	Incumbent re-elected.	▌ ✓ Ron DeSantis (Republican) 58.6%; ▌Bill McCullough (Democratic) 41.4%
Florida 7	R+2	John Mica	Republican	1992	Incumbent lost re-election. Democratic gain.	▌ ✓ Stephanie Murphy (Democratic) 51.5%; ▌John Mica (Republican) 48.5%
Florida 8	R+9	Bill Posey	Republican	2008	Incumbent re-elected.	▌ ✓ Bill Posey (Republican) 63.1%; ▌Corry Westbrook (Democratic) 32.6%; ▌Bill Stinson (Independent) 4.3%
Florida 9	D+3	Alan Grayson	Democratic	2008; 2010 (defeated); 2012	Incumbent retired to run for U.S. Senator; Democratic hold.	▌ ✓ Darren Soto (Democratic) 57.5%; ▌Wayne Liebnitzky (Republican) 42.5%
Florida 10	D+9	None (New seat)			New seat. Democratic gain.	▌ ✓ Val Demings (Democratic) 64.9%; ▌Thuy Lowe (Republican) 35.1%
Florida 11	R+11	Rich Nugent	Republican	2010	Incumbent retired. Republican loss.	▌ ✓ Daniel Webster (Republican) 65.4%; ▌Dave Koller (Democratic) 31.6%; ▌Bruce Ray Riggs (Independent) 3.0%
Florida 11	R+11	Dan Webster; Redistricted from the 10th district	Republican	2010	Incumbent re-elected.	▌ ✓ Daniel Webster (Republican) 65.4%; ▌Dave Koller (Democratic) 31.6%; ▌Bruce Ray Riggs (Independent) 3.0%
Florida 12	R+6	Gus Bilirakis	Republican	2006	Incumbent re-elected.	▌ ✓ Gus Bilirakis (Republican) 68.6%; ▌Robert Tager (Democratic) 31.4%
Florida 13	D+3	David Jolly	Republican	2014 (special)	Incumbent lost re-election. Democratic gain.	▌ ✓ Charlie Crist (Democratic) 51.9%; ▌David Jolly (Republican) 48.1%
Florida 14	D+6	Kathy Castor	Democratic	2006	Incumbent re-elected.	▌ ✓ Kathy Castor (Democratic) 61.8%; ▌Christine Quinn (Republican) 38.2%
Florida 15	R+6	Dennis A. Ross	Republican	2010	Incumbent re-elected.	▌ ✓ Dennis A. Ross (Republican) 57.5%; ▌Jim Lange (Democratic) 42.5%
Florida 16	R+6	Vern Buchanan	Republican	2006	Incumbent re-elected.	▌ ✓ Vern Buchanan (Republican) 59.8%; ▌Jan Schneider (Democratic) 40.2%
Florida 17	R+10	Tom Rooney	Republican	2008	Incumbent re-elected.	▌ ✓ Tom Rooney (Republican) 61.8%; ▌April Freeman (Democratic) 34.2%; ▌John Sawyer (Independent) 3.9%
Florida 18	R+3	Patrick Murphy	Democratic	2012	Incumbent retired to run for U.S. Senator. Republican gain.	▌ ✓ Brian Mast (Republican) 53.6%; ▌Randy Perkins (Democratic) 43.1%; ▌Carla Spalding (Independent) 3.3%
Florida 19	R+12	Curt Clawson	Republican	2014	Incumbent retired. Republican hold.	▌ ✓ Francis Rooney (Republican) 65.9%; ▌Robert Neeld (Democratic) 34.1%
Florida 20	D+30	Alcee Hastings	Democratic	1992	Incumbent re-elected.	▌ ✓ Alcee Hastings (Democratic) 80.3%; ▌Gary Stein (Republican) 19.7%
Florida 21	D+10	Lois Frankel; Redistricted from the 22nd district	Democratic	2012	Incumbent re-elected.	▌ ✓ Lois Frankel (Democratic) 62.7%; ▌Paul Spain (Republican) 35.1%; ▌Mike Trout (Independent) 2.2%
Florida 22	D+5	Ted Deutch; Redistricted from the 21st district	Democratic	2010	Incumbent re-elected.	▌ ✓ Ted Deutch (Democratic) 58.9%; ▌Andrea Leigh McGee (Republican) 41.1%
Florida 23	D+9	Debbie Wasserman Schultz	Democratic	2004	Incumbent re-elected.	▌ ✓ Debbie Wasserman Schultz (Democratic) 56.7%; ▌Joe Kaufman (Republican) 40.5%; ▌Don Endriss (Independent) 1.6%; ▌Lyle Milstein (Independent) 1.2%
Florida 24	D+33	Frederica Wilson	Democratic	2010	Incumbent re-elected.	▌ ✓ Frederica Wilson (Democratic) 100%
Florida 25	R+10	Mario Díaz-Balart	Republican	2002	Incumbent re-elected.	▌ ✓ Mario Díaz-Balart (Republican) 62.4%; ▌Alina Valdes (Democratic) 37.6%
Florida 26	EVEN	Carlos Curbelo	Republican	2014	Incumbent re-elected.	▌ ✓ Carlos Curbelo (Republican) 53.0%; ▌Joe Garcia (Democratic) 41.2%; ▌Jose Peixoto (Independent) 5.9%
Florida 27	R+1	Ileana Ros-Lehtinen	Republican	1989	Incumbent re-elected.	▌ ✓ Ileana Ros-Lehtinen (Republican) 54.9%; ▌Scott Fuhrman (Democratic) 45.1%

== Georgia ==
District		Incumbent			This race	
Location	PVI	Member	Party	First elected	Results	Candidates
Georgia 1	R+9	Buddy Carter	Republican	2014	Incumbent re-elected.	▌ ✓ Buddy Carter (Republican) 99.6%
Georgia 2	D+6	Sanford Bishop	Democratic	1992	Incumbent re-elected.	▌ ✓ Sanford Bishop (Democratic) 61.2%; ▌Greg Duke (Republican) 38.8%
Georgia 3	R+19	Lynn Westmoreland	Republican	2004	Incumbent retired. Republican hold.	▌ ✓ Drew Ferguson (Republican) 68.4%; ▌Angela Pendley (Democratic) 31.6%
Georgia 4	D+21	Hank Johnson	Democratic	2006	Incumbent re-elected.	▌ ✓ Hank Johnson (Democratic) 75.7%; ▌Victor Armendariz (Republican) 24.3%
Georgia 5	D+32	John Lewis	Democratic	1986	Incumbent re-elected.	▌ ✓ John Lewis (Democratic) 84.4%; ▌Douglas Bell (Republican) 15.6%
Georgia 6	R+14	Tom Price	Republican	2004	Incumbent re-elected.	▌ ✓ Tom Price (Republican) 61.7%; ▌Rodney Stooksbury (Democratic) 38.3%
Georgia 7	R+14	Rob Woodall	Republican	2010	Incumbent re-elected.	▌ ✓ Rob Woodall (Republican) 60.4%; ▌Rashid Malik (Democratic) 39.6%
Georgia 8	R+15	Austin Scott	Republican	2010	Incumbent re-elected.	▌ ✓ Austin Scott (Republican) 67.6%; ▌James Harris (Democratic) 32.4%
Georgia 9	R+30	Doug Collins	Republican	2012	Incumbent re-elected.	▌ ✓ Doug Collins (Republican) 100%
Georgia 10	R+14	Jody Hice	Republican	2014	Incumbent re-elected.	▌ ✓ Jody Hice (Republican) 99.6%
Georgia 11	R+19	Barry Loudermilk	Republican	2014	Incumbent re-elected.	▌ ✓ Barry Loudermilk (Republican) 67.4%; ▌Don Wilson (Democratic) 32.6%
Georgia 12	R+9	Rick Allen	Republican	2014	Incumbent re-elected.	▌ ✓ Rick Allen (Republican) 61.6%; ▌Tricia McCracken (Democratic) 38.4%
Georgia 13	D+16	David Scott	Democratic	2002	Incumbent re-elected.	▌ ✓ David Scott (Democratic) 100%
Georgia 14	R+26	Tom Graves	Republican	2010	Incumbent re-elected.	▌ ✓ Tom Graves (Republican) 99.9%

== Hawaii ==
District		Incumbent			This race	
Location	PVI	Member	Party	First elected	Results	Candidates
Hawaii 1	D+18	Vacant			Incumbent Mark Takai (D) died on July 20, 2016. Democratic hold. Winner was also elected to fill unexpired term, see above.	▌ ✓ Colleen Hanabusa (Democratic) 71.9%; ▌Shirlene D. Ostrov (Republican) 22.7%; ▌Alan Yim (Libertarian) 3.3%; ▌Calvin Griffin (Nonpartisan/Green) 2.2%
Hawaii 2	D+21	Tulsi Gabbard	Democratic	2012	Incumbent re-elected.	▌ ✓ Tulsi Gabbard (Democratic) 81.2%; ▌Angela Kaaihue (Republican) 18.8%

== Idaho ==
District		Incumbent			This race	
Location	PVI	Member	Party	First elected	Results	Candidates
Idaho 1	R+18	Raúl Labrador	Republican	2010	Incumbent re-elected.	▌ ✓ Raúl Labrador (Republican) 68.2%; ▌James Piotrowski (Democratic) 31.8%
Idaho 2	R+17	Mike Simpson	Republican	1998	Incumbent re-elected.	▌ ✓ Mike Simpson (Republican) 62.9%; ▌Jennifer Martinez (Democratic) 29.4%; ▌Anthony Tomkins (Constitution) 7.7%

== Illinois ==
District		Incumbent			This race	
Location	PVI	Member	Party	First elected	Results	Candidates
Illinois 1	D+28	Bobby Rush	Democratic	1992	Incumbent re-elected.	▌ ✓ Bobby Rush (Democratic) 74.1%; ▌August Deuser (Republican) 25.9%
Illinois 2	D+29	Robin Kelly	Democratic	2013	Incumbent re-elected.	▌ ✓ Robin Kelly (Democratic) 79.8%; ▌John Morrow (Republican) 20.2%
Illinois 3	D+5	Dan Lipinski	Democratic	2004	Incumbent re-elected.	▌ ✓ Dan Lipinski (Democratic) 100%
Illinois 4	D+29	Luis Gutiérrez	Democratic	1992	Incumbent re-elected.	▌ ✓ Luis Gutiérrez (Democratic) 100%
Illinois 5	D+16	Mike Quigley	Democratic	2008	Incumbent re-elected.	▌ ✓ Mike Quigley (Democratic) 67.8%; ▌Vince Kolber (Republican) 27.5%; ▌Rob Sherman (Green) 4.7%
Illinois 6	R+4	Peter Roskam	Republican	2006	Incumbent re-elected.	▌ ✓ Peter Roskam (Republican) 59.2%; ▌Amanda Howland (Democratic) 40.8%
Illinois 7	D+36	Danny Davis	Democratic	1996	Incumbent re-elected.	▌ ✓ Danny Davis (Democratic) 84.2%; ▌Jeffrey Leef (Republican) 15.8%
Illinois 8	D+8	Tammy Duckworth	Democratic	2012	Incumbent retired to run for U.S. Senator. Democratic hold.	▌ ✓ Raja Krishnamoorthi (Democratic) 58.3%; ▌Pete DiCianni (Republican) 41.7%
Illinois 9	D+15	Jan Schakowsky	Democratic	1998	Incumbent re-elected.	▌ ✓ Jan Schakowsky (Democratic) 66.5%; ▌Joan McCarthy Lasonde (Republican) 33.5%
Illinois 10	D+8	Bob Dold	Republican	2010; 2012 (defeated); 2014	Incumbent lost re-election. Democratic gain.	▌ ✓ Brad Schneider (Democratic) 52.6%; ▌Bob Dold (Republican) 47.4%
Illinois 11	D+8	Bill Foster	Democratic	2008 (special); 2010 (defeated); 2012	Incumbent re-elected.	▌ ✓ Bill Foster (Democratic) 60.4%; ▌Tonia Khouri (Republican) 39.6%
Illinois 12	EVEN	Mike Bost	Republican	2014	Incumbent re-elected.	▌ ✓ Mike Bost (Republican) 54.3%; ▌C. J. Baricevic (Democratic) 39.7%; ▌Paula Bradshaw (Green) 6.0%
Illinois 13	EVEN	Rodney Davis	Republican	2012	Incumbent re-elected.	▌ ✓ Rodney Davis (Republican) 59.7%; ▌Mark Wicklund (Democratic) 40.3%
Illinois 14	R+5	Randy Hultgren	Republican	2010	Incumbent re-elected.	▌ ✓ Randy Hultgren (Republican) 59.3%; ▌Jim Walz (Democratic) 40.7%
Illinois 15	R+14	John Shimkus	Republican	1996	Incumbent re-elected.	▌ ✓ John Shimkus (Republican) 100%
Illinois 16	R+4	Adam Kinzinger	Republican	2010	Incumbent re-elected.	▌ ✓ Adam Kinzinger (Republican) 99.9%
Illinois 17	D+7	Cheri Bustos	Democratic	2012	Incumbent re-elected.	▌ ✓ Cheri Bustos (Democratic) 60.3%; ▌Patrick Harlan (Republican) 39.7%
Illinois 18	R+11	Darin LaHood	Republican	2015	Incumbent re-elected.	▌ ✓ Darin LaHood (Republican) 72.1%; ▌Junius Rodriguez (Democratic) 27.9%

== Indiana ==
District		Incumbent			This race	
Location	PVI	Member	Party	First elected	Results	Candidates
Indiana 1	D+10	Pete Visclosky	Democratic	1984	Incumbent re-elected.	▌ ✓ Pete Visclosky (Democratic) 81.5%; ▌Donna Dunn (Libertarian) 18.5%
Indiana 2	R+6	Jackie Walorski	Republican	2012	Incumbent re-elected.	▌ ✓ Jackie Walorski (Republican) 59.3%; ▌Lynn Coleman (Democratic) 36.9%; ▌Ron Chenkush (Libertarian) 3.8%
Indiana 3	R+13	Marlin Stutzman	Republican	2010	Incumbent retired to run for U.S. Senate. Republican hold.	▌ ✓ Jim Banks (Republican) 70.1%; ▌Tommy Schrader (Democratic) 23.0%; ▌Pepper Snyder (Libertarian) 6.9%
Indiana 4	R+11	Todd Rokita	Republican	2010	Incumbent re-elected.	▌ ✓ Todd Rokita (Republican) 64.6%; ▌John Dale (Democratic) 30.5%; ▌Steve Mayoras (Libertarian) 4.9%
Indiana 5	R+9	Susan Brooks	Republican	2012	Incumbent re-elected.	▌ ✓ Susan Brooks (Republican) 61.5%; ▌Angela Demaree (Democratic) 34.3%; ▌Matt Wittlief (Libertarian) 4.2%
Indiana 6	R+12	Luke Messer	Republican	2012	Incumbent re-elected.	▌ ✓ Luke Messer (Republican) 69.1%; ▌Barry Welsh (Democratic) 26.7%; ▌Rich Turvey (Libertarian) 4.2%
Indiana 7	D+13	André Carson	Democratic	2008	Incumbent re-elected.	▌ ✓ André Carson (Democratic) 60.0%; ▌Cat Ping (Republican) 35.7%; ▌Drew Thompson (Libertarian) 4.3%
Indiana 8	R+8	Larry Bucshon	Republican	2010	Incumbent re-elected.	▌ ✓ Larry Bucshon (Republican) 63.7%; ▌Ron Drake (Democratic) 31.7%; ▌Andrew Horning (Libertarian) 4.6%
Indiana 9	R+9	Todd Young	Republican	2010	Incumbent retired to run for U.S. Senate. Republican hold.	▌ ✓ Trey Hollingsworth (Republican) 54.1%; ▌Shelli Yoder (Democratic) 40.5%; ▌Russell Brooksbank (Libertarian) 5.4%

== Iowa ==
District		Incumbent			This race	
Location	PVI	Member	Party	First elected	Results	Candidates
Iowa 1	D+5	Rod Blum	Republican	2014	Incumbent re-elected.	▌ ✓ Rod Blum (Republican) 53.8%; ▌Monica Vernon (Democratic) 46.2%
Iowa 2	D+4	Dave Loebsack	Democratic	2006	Incumbent re-elected.	▌ ✓ Dave Loebsack (Democratic) 53.7%; ▌Christopher Peters (Republican) 46.3%
Iowa 3	EVEN	David Young	Republican	2014	Incumbent re-elected.	▌ ✓ David Young (Republican) 53.5%; ▌Jim Mowrer (Democratic) 39.8%; ▌Bryan Jack Holder (Libertarian) 3.9%; ▌Claudia Addy (Other) 1.6%; ▌Joe Grandanette (Other) 1.2%
Iowa 4	R+5	Steve King	Republican	2002	Incumbent re-elected.	▌ ✓ Steve King (Republican) 61.3%; ▌Kim Weaver (Democratic) 38.7%

== Kansas ==
District		Incumbent			This race	
Location	PVI	Member	Party	First elected	Results	Candidates
Kansas 1	R+23	Tim Huelskamp	Republican	2010	Incumbent lost renomination. Republican hold.	▌ ✓ Roger Marshall (Republican) 66.1%; ▌Alan LaPolice (Independent) 26.3%; ▌Kerry Burt (Libertarian) 7.5%
Kansas 2	R+8	Lynn Jenkins	Republican	2008	Incumbent re-elected.	▌ ✓ Lynn Jenkins (Republican) 60.9%; ▌Britani Potter (Democratic) 32.6%; ▌James Bales (Libertarian) 6.5%
Kansas 3	R+6	Kevin Yoder	Republican	2010	Incumbent re-elected.	▌ ✓ Kevin Yoder (Republican) 51.3%; ▌Jay Sidie (Democratic) 40.6%; ▌Steven Hohe (Libertarian) 8.1%
Kansas 4	R+14	Mike Pompeo	Republican	2010	Incumbent re-elected.	▌ ✓ Mike Pompeo (Republican) 60.7%; ▌Dan Giroux (Democratic) 29.6%; ▌Miranda Allen (Independent) 6.9%; ▌Gordon Bakken (Libertarian) 2.8%

== Kentucky ==
District		Incumbent			This race	
Location	PVI	Member	Party	First elected	Results	Candidates
Kentucky 1	R+18	Vacant			Incumbent Ed Whitfield (R) resigned September 6, 2016. Republican hold. Winner was also elected to fill unexpired term, see above.	▌ ✓ James Comer (Republican) 72.6%; ▌Sam Gaskins (Democratic) 27.4%
Kentucky 2	R+16	Brett Guthrie	Republican	2008	Incumbent re-elected.	▌ ✓ Brett Guthrie (Republican) 100%
Kentucky 3	D+4	John Yarmuth	Democratic	2006	Incumbent re-elected.	▌ ✓ John Yarmuth (Democratic) 63.5%; ▌Harold Bratcher (Republican) 36.5%
Kentucky 4	R+16	Thomas Massie	Republican	2012	Incumbent re-elected.	▌ ✓ Thomas Massie (Republican) 71.3%; ▌Calvin Sidle (Democratic) 28.7%
Kentucky 5	R+25	Hal Rogers	Republican	1980	Incumbent re-elected.	▌ ✓ Hal Rogers (Republican) 100%
Kentucky 6	R+9	Andy Barr	Republican	2012	Incumbent re-elected.	▌ ✓ Andy Barr (Republican) 61.1%; ▌Nancy Jo Kemper (Democratic) 38.9%

== Louisiana ==
District		Incumbent			This race	
Location	PVI	Member	Party	First elected	Results	Candidates
Louisiana 1	R+26	Steve Scalise	Republican	2008	Incumbent re-elected.	▌ ✓ Steve Scalise (Republican) 74.6%; ▌Lee Ann Dugas (Democratic) 12.8%; ▌Danil Faust (Democratic) 3.9%; ▌Howard Kearney (Libertarian) 2.9%; ▌Joe Swider (Democratic) 2.8%; ▌Eliot Barron (Green) 2.1%; ▌Chuemai Yang (Independent) 1.0%
Louisiana 2	D+23	Cedric Richmond	Democratic	2010	Incumbent re-elected.	▌ ✓ Cedric Richmond (Democratic) 69.8%; ▌Kip Holden (Democratic) 20.1%; ▌Kenneth Cutno (Democratic) 10.1%
Louisiana 3	R+19	Charles Boustany	Republican	2004	Incumbent retired to run for U.S. Senate. Republican hold.	General election: ▌ Scott Angelle (Republican) 28.6%; ▌ Clay Higgins (Republican) 26.5%; ▌Jacob Hebert (Democratic) 8.9%; ▌Larry Rader (Democratic) 8.7%; ▌Gus Rantz (Republican) 8.0%; ▌Greg Ellison (Republican) 7.8%; ▌Brett Geymann (Republican) 6.7%; ▌Bryan Barrilleaux (Republican) 1.9%; ▌Guy McLendon (Libertarian) 0.9%; ▌Kenny Scelfo (Independent) 0.8%; ▌Grover Rees (Republican) 0.8%; ▌Herman Vidrine (Republican) 0.4%; Runoff: ▌ ✓ Clay Higgins (Republican) 56.1%; ▌Scott Angelle (Republican) 43.9%
Louisiana 4	R+13	John Fleming	Republican	2008	Incumbent retired to run for U.S. Senate. Republican hold.	General election: ▌ Marshall Jones (Democratic) 28.2%; ▌ Mike Johnson (Republican) 24.7%; ▌Trey Baucum (Republican) 17.6%; ▌Oliver Jenkins (Republican) 15.6%; ▌Elbert Guillory (Republican) 7.3%; ▌Rick John (Republican) 4.6%; ▌Mark Halverson (Independent) 1.1%; ▌Kenneth Krefft (Independent) 0.9%; Runoff: ▌ ✓ Mike Johnson (Republican) 65.23%; ▌Marshall Jones (Democratic) 34.77%
Louisiana 5	R+15	Ralph Abraham	Republican	2014	Incumbent re-elected.	▌ ✓ Ralph Abraham (Republican) 81.6%; ▌Billy Burkette (Republican) 18.4%
Louisiana 6	R+21	Garret Graves	Republican	2014	Incumbent re-elected.	▌ ✓ Garret Graves (Republican) 62.7%; ▌Richard Lieberman (Democratic) 14.9%; ▌Bob Bell (Republican) 10.1%; ▌Jermaine Sampson (Democratic) 9.0%; ▌Richard Fontanesi (Libertarian) 2.3%; ▌Devin Graham (Independent) 1.0%

== Maine ==
District		Incumbent			This race	
Location	PVI	Member	Party	First elected	Results	Candidates
Maine 1	D+9	Chellie Pingree	Democratic	2008	Incumbent re-elected.	▌ ✓ Chellie Pingree (Democratic) 58.0%; ▌Mark Holbrook (Republican) 42.0%
Maine 2	D+2	Bruce Poliquin	Republican	2014	Incumbent re-elected.	▌ ✓ Bruce Poliquin (Republican) 54.8%; ▌Emily Cain (Democratic) 45.2%

== Maryland ==
District		Incumbent			This race	
Location	PVI	Member	Party	First elected	Results	Candidates
Maryland 1	R+14	Andy Harris	Republican	2010	Incumbent re-elected.	▌ ✓ Andy Harris (Republican) 67.0%; ▌Joe Werner (Democratic) 28.6%; ▌Matt Beers (Libertarian) 4.2%
Maryland 2	D+10	Dutch Ruppersberger	Democratic	2002	Incumbent re-elected.	▌ ✓ Dutch Ruppersberger (Democratic) 62.1%; ▌Pat McDonough (Republican) 33.1%; ▌Kristin Kasprzak (Libertarian) 4.6%
Maryland 3	D+9	John Sarbanes	Democratic	2006	Incumbent re-elected.	▌ ✓ John Sarbanes (Democratic) 63.2%; ▌Mark Plaster (Republican) 33.9%; ▌Eze Nnabu (Green) 2.8%
Maryland 4	D+26	Donna Edwards	Democratic	2008	Incumbent retired to run for U.S. Senator. Democratic hold.	▌ ✓ Anthony Brown (Democratic) 74.1%; ▌George McDermott (Republican) 21.4%; ▌Ben Krause (Libertarian) 1.8%; ▌Kamesha Clark (Green) 2.6%
Maryland 5	D+14	Steny Hoyer	Democratic	1981	Incumbent re-elected.	▌ ✓ Steny Hoyer (Democratic) 67.4%; ▌Mark Arness (Republican) 29.4%; ▌Jason Summers (Libertarian) 3.1%
Maryland 6	D+4	John Delaney	Democratic	2012	Incumbent re-elected.	▌ ✓ John Delaney (Democratic) 56.0%; ▌Amie Hoeber (Republican) 40.1%; ▌David Howser (Libertarian) 2.1%; ▌George Gluck (Green) 1.8%
Maryland 7	D+24	Elijah Cummings	Democratic	1996	Incumbent re-elected.	▌ ✓ Elijah Cummings (Democratic) 74.9%; ▌Corrogan Vaughn (Republican) 21.8%; ▌Myles Hoenig (Green) 3.0%
Maryland 8	D+11	Chris Van Hollen	Democratic	2002	Incumbent retired to run for U.S. Senator. Democratic hold.	▌ ✓ Jamie Raskin (Democratic) 60.6%; ▌Dan Cox (Republican) 34.2%; ▌Jasen Wunder (Libertarian) 2.0%; ▌Nancy Wallace (Green) 3.1%

== Massachusetts ==
District		Incumbent			This race	
Location	PVI	Member	Party	First elected	Results	Candidates
Massachusetts 1	D+13	Richard Neal	Democratic	1988	Incumbent re-elected.	▌ ✓ Richard Neal (Democratic) 73.3%; ▌Frederick Mayock (Independent) 17.9%; ▌Thomas Simmons (Libertarian) 8.6%
Massachusetts 2	D+8	Jim McGovern	Democratic	1996	Incumbent re-elected.	▌ ✓ Jim McGovern (Democratic) 98.2%
Massachusetts 3	D+6	Niki Tsongas	Democratic	2007	Incumbent re-elected.	▌ ✓ Niki Tsongas (Democratic) 68.7%; ▌Ann Wofford (Republican) 31.2%
Massachusetts 4	D+6	Joe Kennedy III	Democratic	2012	Incumbent re-elected.	▌ ✓ Joe Kennedy III (Democratic) 70.1%; ▌David Rosa (Republican) 29.8%
Massachusetts 5	D+14	Katherine Clark	Democratic	2013	Incumbent re-elected.	▌ ✓ Katherine Clark (Democratic) 98.6%
Massachusetts 6	D+4	Seth Moulton	Democratic	2014	Incumbent re-elected.	▌ ✓ Seth Moulton (Democratic) 98.4%
Massachusetts 7	D+31	Mike Capuano	Democratic	1998	Incumbent re-elected.	▌ ✓ Mike Capuano (Democratic) 98.6%
Massachusetts 8	D+6	Stephen Lynch	Democratic	2001	Incumbent re-elected.	▌ ✓ Stephen Lynch (Democratic) 72.4%; ▌William Burke (Republican) 27.5%
Massachusetts 9	D+5	Bill Keating	Democratic	2010	Incumbent re-elected.	▌ ✓ Bill Keating (Democratic) 55.7%; ▌Mark Alliegro (Republican) 33.6%; ▌Paul Harrington (Independent) 6.9%; ▌Chris Cataldo (Unenrolled) 2.2%; ▌Anna Raduc (Unenrolled) 1.4%

== Michigan ==
District		Incumbent			This race	
Location	PVI	Member	Party	First elected	Results	Candidates
Michigan 1	R+5	Dan Benishek	Republican	2010	Incumbent retired. Republican hold.	▌ ✓ Jack Bergman (Republican) 54.9%; ▌Lon Johnson (Democratic) 40.1%; ▌Diane Bostow (Libertarian) 3.7%; ▌Ellis Boal (Green) 1.3%
Michigan 2	R+7	Bill Huizenga	Republican	2010	Incumbent re-elected.	▌ ✓ Bill Huizenga (Republican) 62.6%; ▌Dennis B. Murphy (Democratic) 32.5%; ▌Erwin J. Haas (Libertarian) 2.4%; ▌Matthew Brady (Green) 1.6%; ▌Ronald Graeser (U.S. Taxpayers) 0.9%
Michigan 3	R+4	Justin Amash	Republican	2010	Incumbent re-elected.	▌ ✓ Justin Amash (Republican) 59.5%; ▌Douglas Smith (Democratic) 37.5%; ▌Ted Gerrard (U.S. Taxpayers) 3.0%
Michigan 4	R+5	John Moolenaar	Republican	2014	Incumbent re-elected.	▌ ✓ John Moolenaar (Republican) 61.6%; ▌Debra Wirth (Democratic) 32.1%; ▌Leonard Schwartz (Libertarian) 2.7%; ▌Jordan Salvi (Green) 1.3%
Michigan 5	D+10	Dan Kildee	Democratic	2012	Incumbent re-elected.	▌ ✓ Dan Kildee (Democratic) 61.2%; ▌Allen Hardwick (Republican) 35.1%; ▌Steve Sluka (Libertarian) 2.2%; ▌George Zimmer (U.S. Taxpayers) 1.8%; ▌Harley Mikkelson (Green) 1.5%; ▌Keith Butkovich (Natural Law) 0.6%
Michigan 6	R+1	Fred Upton	Republican	1986	Incumbent re-elected.	▌ ✓ Fred Upton (Republican) 58.7%; ▌Paul Clements (Democratic) 36.4%; ▌Lorence Wenke (Libertarian) 4.9%
Michigan 7	R+3	Tim Walberg	Republican	2006; 2008 (defeated); 2010	Incumbent re-elected.	▌ ✓ Tim Walberg (Republican) 55.0%; ▌Gretchen Driskell (Democratic) 40.0%; ▌Ken Proctor (Libertarian) 4.9%
Michigan 8	R+2	Mike Bishop	Republican	2014	Incumbent re-elected.	▌ ✓ Mike Bishop (Republican) 56.0%; ▌Suzanna Shkreli (Democratic) 39.2%; ▌Jeff Wood (Libertarian) 2.6%; ▌Maria Green (Green) 1.5%; ▌Jeremy Burgess (Natural Law) 0.6%
Michigan 9	D+6	Sander Levin	Democratic	1982	Incumbent re-elected.	▌ ✓ Sander Levin (Democratic) 57.9%; ▌Christopher Morse (Republican) 37.4%; ▌Matthew Orlando (Libertarian) 2.8%; ▌John McDermott (Green) 1.9%
Michigan 10	R+6	Candice S. Miller	Republican	2002	Incumbent retired. Republican hold.	▌ ✓ Paul Mitchell (Republican) 63.1%; ▌Frank Accavitti (Democratic) 32.3%; ▌Lisa Gioia (Libertarian) 3.1%; ▌Benjamin Nofs (Green) 1.5%
Michigan 11	R+4	David Trott	Republican	2014	Incumbent re-elected.	▌ ✓ David Trott (Republican) 52.9%; ▌Anil Kumar (Democratic) 40.2%; ▌Kerry Bentivolio (Independent) 4.4%; ▌Jonathan Osment (Libertarian) 2.5%
Michigan 12	D+15	Debbie Dingell	Democratic	2014	Incumbent re-elected.	▌ ✓ Debbie Dingell (Democratic) 64.3%; ▌Jeff Jones (Republican) 29.3%; ▌Gary Walkowicz (Working Class) 2.8%; ▌Tom Bagwell (Libertarian) 2.3%; ▌Dylan Calewarts (Green) 1.3%
Michigan 13	D+34	John Conyers	Democratic	1964	Incumbent re-elected.	▌ ✓ John Conyers (Democratic) 77.1%; ▌Jeff Gorman (Republican) 15.7%; ▌Tiffany Hayden (Libertarian) 3.8%; ▌Sam Johnson (Working Class) 3.4%
Michigan 14	D+29	Brenda Lawrence	Democratic	2014	Incumbent re-elected.	▌ ✓ Brenda Lawrence (Democratic) 78.5%; ▌Howard Klausner (Republican) 18.7%; ▌Gregory Creswell (Libertarian) 1.6%; ▌Marcia Squier (Green) 1.2%

== Minnesota ==
District		Incumbent			This race	
Location	PVI	Member	Party	First elected	Results	Candidates
Minnesota 1	R+1	Tim Walz	DFL	2006	Incumbent re-elected.	▌ ✓ Tim Walz (DFL) 50.3%; ▌Jim Hagedorn (Republican) 49.6%
Minnesota 2	R+2	John Kline	Republican	2002	Incumbent retired. Republican hold.	▌ ✓ Jason Lewis (Republican) 47.0%; ▌Angie Craig (DFL) 45.2%; ▌Paula Overby (Independence) 7.8%
Minnesota 3	R+2	Erik Paulsen	Republican	2008	Incumbent re-elected.	▌ ✓ Erik Paulsen (Republican) 56.7%; ▌Terri Bonoff (DFL) 43%
Minnesota 4	D+11	Betty McCollum	DFL	2000	Incumbent re-elected.	▌ ✓ Betty McCollum (DFL) 57.8%; ▌Greg Ryan (Republican) 34.4%; ▌Susan Sindt (Legal Marijuana Now) 7.7%
Minnesota 5	D+22	Keith Ellison	DFL	2006	Incumbent re-elected.	▌ ✓ Keith Ellison (DFL) 69.1%; ▌Frank Drake (Republican) 22.3%; ▌Dennis Schuller (Legal Marijuana Now) 8.5%
Minnesota 6	R+10	Tom Emmer	Republican	2014	Incumbent re-elected.	▌ ✓ Tom Emmer (Republican) 65.6%; ▌David Snyder (DFL) 34.3%
Minnesota 7	R+6	Collin Peterson	DFL	1990	Incumbent re-elected.	▌ ✓ Collin Peterson (DFL) 52.5%; ▌Dave Hughes (Republican) 47.4%
Minnesota 8	D+1	Rick Nolan	DFL	1974; 1980 (retired); 2012	Incumbent re-elected.	▌ ✓ Rick Nolan (DFL) 50.2%; ▌Stewart Mills (Republican) 49.6%

== Mississippi ==
District		Incumbent			This race	
Location	PVI	Member	Party	First elected	Results	Candidates
Mississippi 1	R+16	Trent Kelly	Republican	2015	Incumbent re-elected.	▌ ✓ Trent Kelly (Republican) 68.7%; ▌Jacob Owens (Democratic) 27.9%; ▌Chase Wilson (Libertarian) 2.1%; ▌Cathy Toole (Reform) 1.3%
Mississippi 2	D+13	Bennie Thompson	Democratic	1993	Incumbent re-elected.	▌ ✓ Bennie Thompson (Democratic) 67.1%; ▌John Bouie (Republican) 29.1%; ▌Troy Ray (Independent) 2.4%; ▌Johnny McLeod (Reform) 1.3%
Mississippi 3	R+14	Gregg Harper	Republican	2008	Incumbent re-elected.	▌ ✓ Gregg Harper (Republican) 66.2%; ▌Dennis Quinn (Democratic) 30.4%; ▌Roger Gerrard (Veterans) 2.7%; ▌Lajena Sheets (Reform) 0.7%
Mississippi 4	R+21	Steven Palazzo	Republican	2010	Incumbent re-elected.	▌ ✓ Steven Palazzo (Republican) 65.0%; ▌Mark Gladney (Democratic) 27.8%; ▌Ric McCluskey (Libertarian) 5.3%; ▌Shawn O'Hara (Reform) 1.9%

== Missouri ==
District		Incumbent			This race	
Location	PVI	Member	Party	First elected	Results	Candidates
Missouri 1	D+28	Lacy Clay	Democratic	2000	Incumbent re-elected.	▌ ✓ Lacy Clay (Democratic) 75.5%; ▌Steven G. Bailey (Republican) 20.0%; ▌Robb Cunningham (Libertarian) 4.6%
Missouri 2	R+8	Ann Wagner	Republican	2012	Incumbent re-elected.	▌ ✓ Ann Wagner (Republican) 58.5%; ▌Bill Otto (Democratic) 37.7%; ▌Jim Higgins (Libertarian) 2.8%; ▌David Arnold (Green) 0.9%
Missouri 3	R+13	Blaine Luetkemeyer	Republican	2008	Incumbent re-elected.	▌ ✓ Blaine Luetkemeyer (Republican) 67.8%; ▌Kevin Miller (Democratic) 27.9%; ▌Dan Hogan (Libertarian) 3.3%; ▌Doanita Simmons (Constitution) 1.0%
Missouri 4	R+13	Vicky Hartzler	Republican	2010	Incumbent re-elected.	▌ ✓ Vicky Hartzler (Republican) 67.8%; ▌Gordon Christensen (Democratic) 27.8%; ▌Mark Bliss (Libertarian) 4.3%
Missouri 5	D+9	Emanuel Cleaver	Democratic	2004	Incumbent re-elected.	▌ ✓ Emanuel Cleaver (Democratic) 58.8%; ▌Jacob Turk (Republican) 38.2%; ▌Roy Welborn (Libertarian) 3.0%
Missouri 6	R+12	Sam Graves	Republican	2000	Incumbent re-elected.	▌ ✓ Sam Graves (Republican) 68.0%; ▌David Blackwell (Democratic) 28.4%; ▌Russ Monchil (Libertarian) 2.3%; ▌Mike Diel (Green) 1.2%
Missouri 7	R+19	Billy Long	Republican	2010	Incumbent re-elected.	▌ ✓ Billy Long (Republican) 67.5%; ▌Genevieve Williams (Democratic) 27.4%; ▌Benjamin Brixey (Libertarian) 5.1%
Missouri 8	R+17	Jason T. Smith	Republican	2013	Incumbent re-elected.	▌ ✓ Jason T. Smith (Republican) 74.4%; ▌Dave Cowell (Democratic) 22.7%; ▌Jonathan Shell (Libertarian) 2.9%

== Montana ==
District		Incumbent			This race	
Location	PVI	Member	Party	First elected	Results	Candidates
Montana at-large	R+7	Ryan Zinke	Republican	2014	Incumbent re-elected.	▌ ✓ Ryan Zinke (Republican) 56.2%; ▌Denise Juneau (Democratic) 40.5%; ▌Rick Breckenridge (Libertarian) 3.3%

== Nebraska ==
District		Incumbent			This race	
Location	PVI	Member	Party	First elected	Results	Candidates
Nebraska 1	R+10	Jeff Fortenberry	Republican	2004	Incumbent re-elected.	▌ ✓ Jeff Fortenberry (Republican) 69.5%; ▌Daniel Wik (Democratic) 30.5%
Nebraska 2	R+4	Brad Ashford	Democratic	2014	Incumbent lost re-election. Republican gain.	▌ ✓ Don Bacon (Republican) 48.9%; ▌Brad Ashford (Democratic) 47.7%; ▌Steven Laird (Libertarian) 3.3%
Nebraska 3	R+23	Adrian Smith	Republican	2006	Incumbent re-elected.	▌ ✓ Adrian Smith (Republican) 100%

== Nevada ==
District		Incumbent			This race	
Location	PVI	Member	Party	First elected	Results	Candidates
Nevada 1	D+14	Dina Titus	Democratic	2008; 2010 (defeated); 2012	Incumbent re-elected.	▌ ✓ Dina Titus (Democratic) 61.9%; ▌Mary Perry (Republican) 28.8%; ▌Reuben D'Silva (Independent) 7.3%; ▌Kamau Bakari (Independent American) 2.0%
Nevada 2	R+5	Mark Amodei	Republican	2011	Incumbent re-elected.	▌ ✓ Mark Amodei (Republican) 58.3%; ▌Chip Evans (Democratic) 36.9%; ▌John Everhart (Independent American) 2.8%; ▌Drew Knight (Independent) 2.0%
Nevada 3	EVEN	Joe Heck	Republican	2010	Incumbent retired to run for U.S. Senator. Democratic gain.	▌ ✓ Jacky Rosen (Democratic) 47.2%; ▌Danny Tarkanian (Republican) 46.0%; ▌Warren Markowitz (Independent American) 3.7%; ▌David Goossen (Independent) 3.1%
Nevada 4	D+4	Cresent Hardy	Republican	2014	Incumbent lost re-election. Democratic gain.	▌ ✓ Ruben Kihuen (Democratic) 48.5%; ▌Cresent Hardy (Republican) 44.5%; ▌Steve Brown (Libertarian) 3.8%; ▌Mike Little (Independent American) 3.1%

== New Hampshire ==
District		Incumbent			This race	
Location	PVI	Member	Party	First elected	Results	Candidates
New Hampshire 1	R+1	Frank Guinta	Republican	2010; 2012 (defeated); 2014	Incumbent lost re-election. Democratic gain.	▌ ✓ Carol Shea-Porter (Democratic) 44.3%; ▌Frank Guinta (Republican) 43.0%; ▌Shawn O'Connor (Independent) 9.5%; ▌Brendan Kelly (Independent) 1.7%; ▌Robert Lombardo (Libertarian) 1.5%
New Hampshire 2	D+3	Annie Kuster	Democratic	2012	Incumbent re-elected.	▌ ✓ Annie Kuster (Democratic) 49.8%; ▌Jim Lawrence (Republican) 45.3%; ▌John Babiarz (Independent) 4.9%

== New Jersey ==
District		Incumbent			This race	
Location	PVI	Member	Party	First elected	Results	Candidates
New Jersey 1	D+13	Donald Norcross	Democratic	2014	Incumbent re-elected.	▌ ✓ Donald Norcross (Democratic) 60.0%; ▌Bob Patterson (Republican) 36.8%; ▌Scot Tomaszewski (Independent) 1.8%; Others: ▌William Shir (Libertarian) 0.8%; ▌Mike Berman (Independent) 0.6%
New Jersey 2	D+1	Frank LoBiondo	Republican	1994	Incumbent re-elected.	▌ ✓ Frank LoBiondo (Republican) 59.2%; ▌David Cole (Democratic) 37.2%; ▌John Ordille (Libertarian) 1.3%; Others: ▌James Keenan (Independent) 0.9%; ▌Steven Fenichel (Independent) 0.5%; ▌Eric Beechwood (Independent) 0.5%; ▌Gabriel Franco (Independent) 0.4%
New Jersey 3	R+1	Tom MacArthur	Republican	2014	Incumbent re-elected.	▌ ✓ Tom MacArthur (Republican) 59.3%; ▌Fred LaVergne (Democratic) 38.9%; ▌Lawrence Berlinski (Constitution) 1.8%
New Jersey 4	R+7	Chris Smith	Republican	1980	Incumbent re-elected.	▌ ✓ Chris Smith (Republican) 63.7%; ▌Lorna Phillipson (Democratic) 33.5%; ▌Hank Schroeder (Independent) 1.8%; ▌Jeremy Marcus (Libertarian) 1.0%
New Jersey 5	R+4	Scott Garrett	Republican	2002	Incumbent lost re-election. Democratic gain.	▌ ✓ Josh Gottheimer (Democratic) 51.1%; ▌Scott Garrett (Republican) 46.7%; ▌Claudio Belusic (Libertarian) 2.2%
New Jersey 6	D+8	Frank Pallone	Democratic	1988	Incumbent re-elected.	▌ ✓ Frank Pallone (Democratic) 63.7%; ▌Brent Sonnek-Schmelz (Republican) 34.9%; ▌Rajit Malliah (Green) 0.7%; ▌Judith Shamy (Libertarian) 0.7%
New Jersey 7	R+6	Leonard Lance	Republican	2008	Incumbent re-elected.	▌ ✓ Leonard Lance (Republican) 54.1%; ▌Peter Jacob (Democratic) 43.1%; ▌Dan O'Neill (Libertarian) 1.6%; ▌Arthur Haussmann (Independent) 1.2%
New Jersey 8	D+24	Albio Sires	Democratic	2006	Incumbent re-elected.	▌ ✓ Albio Sires (Democratic) 77.0%; ▌Agha Khan (Republican) 18.5%; ▌Pablo Olivera (Independent) 2.5%; ▌Dan Delaney (Libertarian) 2.0%
New Jersey 9	D+14	Bill Pascrell	Democratic	1996	Incumbent re-elected.	▌ ✓ Bill Pascrell (Democratic) 69.7%; ▌Hector Castillo (Republican) 28.0%; ▌Diego Rivera (Libertarian) 1.4%; ▌Jeff Boss (Independent) 0.8%
New Jersey 10	D+34	Donald Payne Jr.	Democratic	2012	Incumbent re-elected.	▌ ✓ Donald Payne Jr. (Democratic) 85.7%; ▌David Pinckney (Republican) 11.9%; ▌Joanne Miller (Independent) 1.7%; ▌Aaron Fraser (Independent) 0.8%
New Jersey 11	R+6	Rodney Frelinghuysen	Republican	1994	Incumbent re-elected.	▌ ✓ Rodney Frelinghuysen (Republican) 58.0%; ▌Joseph Wenzel (Democratic) 38.9%; ▌Thomas Depasquale (Independent) 2.1%; ▌Jeff Hetrick (Libertarian) 1.0%
New Jersey 12	D+14	Bonnie Watson Coleman	Democratic	2014	Incumbent re-elected.	▌ ✓ Bonnie Watson Coleman (Democratic) 62.9%; ▌Steven Uccio (Republican) 32.0%; ▌Edward Forchion (Independent) 2.1%; ▌Robert Shapiro (Independent) 1.0%; Others: ▌Thomas Fitzpatrick (Libertarian) 0.9%; ▌Steven Welzer (Green) 0.7%; ▌Michael Bollentin (Independent) 0.5%

== New Mexico ==
District		Incumbent			This race	
Location	PVI	Member	Party	First elected	Results	Candidates
New Mexico 1	D+7	Michelle Lujan Grisham	Democratic	2012	Incumbent re-elected	▌ ✓ Michelle Lujan Grisham (Democratic) 65.1%; ▌Richard Priem (Republican) 34.9%
New Mexico 2	R+5	Steve Pearce	Republican	2002; 2008 (retired); 2010	Incumbent re-elected	▌ ✓ Steve Pearce (Republican) 62.7%; ▌Merrie Lee Soules (Democratic) 37.3%
New Mexico 3	D+8	Ben Ray Luján	Democratic	2008	Incumbent re-elected	▌ ✓ Ben Ray Luján (Democratic) 62.4%; ▌Michael Romero (Republican) 37.6%

== New York ==
District		Incumbent			This race	
Location	PVI	Member	Party	First elected	Results	Candidates
New York 1	R+2	Lee Zeldin	Republican	2014	Incumbent re-elected	▌ ✓ Lee Zeldin (Republican) 58.9%; ▌Anna Throne-Holst (Democratic) 41.0%
New York 2	R+1	Peter T. King	Republican	1992	Incumbent re-elected	▌ ✓ Peter T. King (Republican) 62.4%; ▌DuWayne Gregory (Democratic) 37.5%
New York 3	EVEN	Steve Israel	Democratic	2000	Incumbent retired. Democratic hold.	▌ ✓ Tom Suozzi (Democratic) 53.0%; ▌Jack Martins (Republican) 47.0%
New York 4	D+3	Kathleen Rice	Democratic	2014	Incumbent re-elected	▌ ✓ Kathleen Rice (Democratic) 59.5%; ▌David Gurfein (Republican) 40.4%
New York 5	D+35	Gregory Meeks	Democratic	1998	Incumbent re-elected	▌ ✓ Gregory Meeks (Democratic) 85.4%; ▌Michael O'Reilly (Republican) 13.0%; ▌Frank Francois (Green) 1.4%
New York 6	D+13	Grace Meng	Democratic	2012	Incumbent re-elected	▌ ✓ Grace Meng (Democratic) 72.1%; ▌Danniel Maio (Republican) 26.7%; ▌Haris Bhatti (Independent) 1.1%
New York 7	D+34	Nydia Velázquez	Democratic	1992	Incumbent re-elected	▌ ✓ Nydia Velázquez (Democratic) 90.7%; ▌Allan Romaguera (Republican) 9.2%
New York 8	D+35	Hakeem Jeffries	Democratic	2012	Incumbent re-elected	▌ ✓ Hakeem Jeffries (Democratic) 93.2%; ▌Daniel Cavanagh (Conservative) 6.7%
New York 9	D+32	Yvette Clarke	Democratic	2006	Incumbent re-elected	▌ ✓ Yvette Clarke (Democratic) 92.3%; ▌Alan Bellone (Conservative) 7.6%
New York 10	D+23	Jerry Nadler	Democratic	1992	Incumbent re-elected	▌ ✓ Jerry Nadler (Democratic) 78.0%; ▌Phillip Rosenthal (Republican) 21.9%
New York 11	R+2	Dan Donovan	Republican	2015	Incumbent re-elected	▌ ✓ Dan Donovan (Republican) 61.5%; ▌Richard Reichard (Democratic) 36.7%; ▌Henry Bardel (Green) 1.5%
New York 12	D+27	Carolyn Maloney	Democratic	1992	Incumbent re-elected	▌ ✓ Carolyn Maloney (Democratic) 83.1%; ▌Robert Ardini (Republican) 16.8%
New York 13	D+42	Charles B. Rangel	Democratic	1970	Incumbent retired. Democratic hold.	▌ ✓ Adriano Espaillat (Democratic) 88.6%; ▌Robert Evans (Republican) 6.9%; ▌Daniel Rivera (Green) 3.2%; ▌Scott Fenstermaker (Independent) 0.8%
New York 14	D+26	Joseph Crowley	Democratic	1998	Incumbent re-elected	▌ ✓ Joseph Crowley (Democratic) 82.8%; ▌Frank Spotorno (Republican) 17.1%
New York 15	D+42	José E. Serrano	Democratic	1990	Incumbent re-elected	▌ ✓ José E. Serrano (Democratic) 95.2%; ▌Alejandro Vega (Republican) 3.5%; ▌Eduardo Ramirez (Conservative) 1.2%
New York 16	D+21	Eliot Engel	Democratic	1988	Incumbent re-elected	▌ ✓ Eliot Engel (Democratic) 94.4%; ▌Derickson Lawrence (Independent) 5.3%
New York 17	D+5	Nita Lowey	Democratic	1988	Incumbent re-elected	▌ ✓ Nita Lowey (Democratic) 99.1%
New York 18	EVEN	Sean Patrick Maloney	Democratic	2012	Incumbent re-elected	▌ ✓ Sean Patrick Maloney (Democratic) 55.6%; ▌Phil Oliva (Republican) 44.4%
New York 19	D+1	Chris Gibson	Republican	2010	Incumbent retired. Republican hold.	▌ ✓ John Faso (Republican) 54.2%; ▌Zephyr Teachout (Democratic) 45.7%
New York 20	D+7	Paul Tonko	Democratic	2008	Incumbent re-elected	▌ ✓ Paul Tonko (Democratic) 67.9%; ▌Francis Vitollo (Republican) 32.1%
New York 21	EVEN	Elise Stefanik	Republican	2014	Incumbent re-elected	▌ ✓ Elise Stefanik (Republican) 65.3%; ▌Mike Derrick (Democratic) 30.1%; ▌Matthew Funiciello (Green) 4.6%
New York 22	R+3	Richard L. Hanna	Republican	2010	Incumbent retired. Republican hold.	▌ ✓ Claudia Tenney (Republican) 46.5%; ▌Kim Myers (Democratic) 41.0%; ▌Martin Babinec (Reform) 11.8%
New York 23	R+3	Tom Reed	Republican	2010 (special)	Incumbent re-elected	▌ ✓ Tom Reed (Republican) 57.6%; ▌John Plumb (Democratic) 42.4%
New York 24	D+5	John Katko	Republican	2014	Incumbent re-elected	▌ ✓ John Katko (Republican) 60.5%; ▌Colleen Deacon (Democratic) 39.4%
New York 25	D+7	Louise Slaughter	Democratic	1986	Incumbent re-elected	▌ ✓ Louise Slaughter (Democratic) 56.1%; ▌Mark Assini (Republican) 43.8%
New York 26	D+13	Brian Higgins	Democratic	2004	Incumbent re-elected	▌ ✓ Brian Higgins (Democratic) 74.6%; ▌Shelly Shratz (Republican) 25.4%
New York 27	R+8	Chris Collins	Republican	2012	Incumbent re-elected	▌ ✓ Chris Collins (Republican) 67.2%; ▌Diana Kastenbaum (Democratic) 32.8%

== North Carolina ==
District		Incumbent			This race	
Location	PVI	Member	Party	First elected	Results	Candidates
North Carolina 1	D+15	G. K. Butterfield	Democratic	2004	Incumbent re-elected.	▌ ✓ G. K. Butterfield (Democratic) 68.6%; ▌H. Powell Dew (Republican) 29.0%; ▌J. J. Summerell (Libertarian) 2.4%
North Carolina 2	R+8	Renee Ellmers	Republican	2010	Incumbent lost renomination. Republican loss.	▌ ✓ George Holding (Republican) 56.7%; ▌John McNeil (Democratic) 43.3%
North Carolina 2	R+8	George Holding; Redistricted from the 13th district	Republican	2012	Incumbent re-elected.	▌ ✓ George Holding (Republican) 56.7%; ▌John McNeil (Democratic) 43.3%
North Carolina 3	R+11	Walter B. Jones Jr.	Republican	1994	Incumbent re-elected.	▌ ✓ Walter B. Jones Jr. (Republican) 67.2%; ▌Ernest Reeves (Democratic) 32.8%
North Carolina 4	D+13	David Price	Democratic	1986; 1994 (defeated); 1996	Incumbent re-elected.	▌ ✓ David Price (Democratic) 68.2%; ▌Sue Googe (Republican) 31.8%
North Carolina 5	R+9	Virginia Foxx	Republican	2004	Incumbent re-elected.	▌ ✓ Virginia Foxx (Republican) 58.4%; ▌Josh Brannon (Democratic) 41.6%
North Carolina 6	R+10	Mark Walker	Republican	2014	Incumbent re-elected.	▌ ✓ Mark Walker (Republican) 59.2%; ▌Pete Glidewell (Democratic) 40.8%
North Carolina 7	R+9	David Rouzer	Republican	2014	Incumbent re-elected.	▌ ✓ David Rouzer (Republican) 60.9%; ▌J. Wesley Casteen (Democratic) 39.1%
North Carolina 8	R+8	Richard Hudson	Republican	2012	Incumbent re-elected.	▌ ✓ Richard Hudson (Republican) 58.8%; ▌Thomas Mills (Democratic) 41.2%
North Carolina 9	R+8	Robert Pittenger	Republican	2012	Incumbent re-elected.	▌ ✓ Robert Pittenger (Republican) 58.2%; ▌Christian Cano (Democratic) 41.8%
North Carolina 10	R+11	Patrick McHenry	Republican	2004	Incumbent re-elected.	▌ ✓ Patrick McHenry (Republican) 63.1%; ▌Andy Millard (Democratic) 36.9%
North Carolina 11	R+12	Mark Meadows	Republican	2012	Incumbent re-elected.	▌ ✓ Mark Meadows (Republican) 64.1%; ▌Rick Bryson (Democratic) 35.9%
North Carolina 12	D+16	Alma Adams	Democratic	2014	Incumbent re-elected.	▌ ✓ Alma Adams (Democratic) 67.0%; ▌Leon Threatt (Republican) 33.0%
North Carolina 13	R+5	None (New seat)			New seat. Republican gain.	▌ ✓ Ted Budd (Republican) 56.1%; ▌Bruce Davis (Democratic) 43.9%

== North Dakota ==
District		Incumbent			This race	
Location	PVI	Member	Party	First elected	Results	Candidates
North Dakota at-large	R+10	Kevin Cramer	Republican	2012	Incumbent re-elected	▌ ✓ Kevin Cramer (Republican) 69.1%; ▌Chase Iron Eyes (Democratic-NPL) 23.8%; ▌Jack Seaman (Libertarian) 7.0%

== Ohio ==
District		Incumbent			This race	
Location	PVI	Member	Party	First elected	Results	Candidates
Ohio 1	R+6	Steve Chabot	Republican	1994; 2008 (defeated); 2010	Incumbent re-elected.	▌ ✓ Steve Chabot (Republican) 59.2%; ▌Michele Young (Democratic) 40.8%
Ohio 2	R+8	Brad Wenstrup	Republican	2012	Incumbent re-elected.	▌ ✓ Brad Wenstrup (Republican) 65.0%; ▌William Smith (Democratic) 32.8%
Ohio 3	D+17	Joyce Beatty	Democratic	2012	Incumbent re-elected.	▌ ✓ Joyce Beatty (Democratic) 68.6%; ▌John Adams (Republican) 31.4%
Ohio 4	R+9	Jim Jordan	Republican	2006	Incumbent re-elected.	▌ ✓ Jim Jordan (Republican) 68.0%; ▌Janet Garrett (Democratic) 32.0%
Ohio 5	R+7	Bob Latta	Republican	2006	Incumbent re-elected.	▌ ✓ Bob Latta (Republican) 70.9%; ▌James Neu (Democratic) 29.1%
Ohio 6	R+8	Bill Johnson	Republican	2010	Incumbent re-elected.	▌ ✓ Bill Johnson (Republican) 70.7%; ▌Michael Lorentz (Democratic) 29.3%
Ohio 7	R+6	Bob Gibbs	Republican	2010	Incumbent re-elected.	▌ ✓ Bob Gibbs (Republican) 64.0%; ▌Roy Rich (Democratic) 29.0%; ▌Dan Phillip (Independent) 7.0%
Ohio 8	R+15	Warren Davidson	Republican	2016	Incumbent re-elected.	▌ ✓ Warren Davidson (Republican) 68.8%; ▌Steven Fought (Democratic) 27.0%; ▌Derrick Hendricks (Green) 4.3%
Ohio 9	D+15	Marcy Kaptur	Democratic	1982	Incumbent re-elected.	▌ ✓ Marcy Kaptur (Democratic) 68.7%; ▌Donald Larson (Republican) 31.3%
Ohio 10	R+3	Mike Turner	Republican	2002	Incumbent re-elected.	▌ ✓ Mike Turner (Republican) 64.1%; ▌Robert Klepinger (Democratic) 32.7%; ▌Tom McMasters (Independent) 3.2%
Ohio 11	D+30	Marcia Fudge	Democratic	2006	Incumbent re-elected.	▌ ✓ Marcia Fudge (Democratic) 80.3%; ▌Beverly Goldstein (Republican) 19.8%
Ohio 12	R+8	Pat Tiberi	Republican	2000	Incumbent re-elected.	▌ ✓ Pat Tiberi (Republican) 66.6%; ▌Ed Albertson (Democratic) 29.8%; ▌Joe Manchik (Green) 3.6%
Ohio 13	D+11	Tim Ryan	Democratic	2002	Incumbent re-elected.	▌ ✓ Tim Ryan (Democratic) 67.7%; ▌Richard Morckel (Republican) 32.3%
Ohio 14	R+4	David Joyce	Republican	2012	Incumbent re-elected.	▌ ✓ David Joyce (Republican) 62.6%; ▌Michael Wager (Democratic) 37.4%
Ohio 15	R+6	Steve Stivers	Republican	2010	Incumbent re-elected.	▌ ✓ Steve Stivers (Republican) 66.2%; ▌Scott Wharton (Democratic) 33.8%
Ohio 16	R+6	Jim Renacci	Republican	2010	Incumbent re-elected.	▌ ✓ Jim Renacci (Republican) 65.3%; ▌Keith Mundy (Democratic) 34.7%

== Oklahoma ==
District		Incumbent			This race	
Location	PVI	Member	Party	First elected	Results	Candidates
Oklahoma 1	R+18	Jim Bridenstine	Republican	2012	Incumbent re-elected.	▌ ✓ Jim Bridenstine (Republican) 100%
Oklahoma 2	R+20	Markwayne Mullin	Republican	2012	Incumbent re-elected.	▌ ✓ Markwayne Mullin (Republican) 70.6%; ▌Joshua Harris-Till (Democratic) 23.2%; ▌John McCarthy (Independent) 6.2%
Oklahoma 3	R+26	Frank Lucas	Republican	1994	Incumbent re-elected.	▌ ✓ Frank Lucas (Republican) 78.3%; ▌Frankie Robbins (Democratic) 21.7%
Oklahoma 4	R+19	Tom Cole	Republican	2002	Incumbent re-elected.	▌ ✓ Tom Cole (Republican) 69.6%; ▌Christina Owen (Democratic) 26.1%; ▌Sevier White (Libertarian) 4.3%
Oklahoma 5	R+12	Steve Russell	Republican	2014	Incumbent re-elected.	▌ ✓ Steve Russell (Republican) 57.1%; ▌Al McAffrey (Democratic) 36.8%; ▌Zachary Knight (Libertarian) 6.1%

== Oregon ==
District		Incumbent			This race	
Location	PVI	Member	Party	First elected	Results	Candidates
Oregon 1	D+7	Suzanne Bonamici	Democratic	2012	Incumbent re-elected.	▌ ✓ Suzanne Bonamici (Democratic) 59.6%; ▌Brian Heinrich (Republican) 37.0%; ▌Kyle Sheahan (Libertarian) 3.2%
Oregon 2	R+10	Greg Walden	Republican	1998	Incumbent re-elected.	▌ ✓ Greg Walden (Republican) 71.7%; ▌Jim Crary (Democratic) 28.0%
Oregon 3	D+22	Earl Blumenauer	Democratic	1996	Incumbent re-elected.	▌ ✓ Earl Blumenauer (Democratic) 71.8%; ▌David Walker (Independent Party) 20.5%; ▌David Delk (Progressive) 7.3%
Oregon 4	D+2	Peter DeFazio	Democratic	1986	Incumbent re-elected.	▌ ✓ Peter DeFazio (Democratic) 55.5%; ▌Art Robinson (Republican) 39.7%; ▌Mike Beilstein (Pacific Green) 3.0%; ▌Gil Guthrie (Libertarian) 1.6%
Oregon 5	EVEN	Kurt Schrader	Democratic	2008	Incumbent re-elected.	▌ ✓ Kurt Schrader (Democratic) 53.5%; ▌Colm Willis (Republican) 43.0%; ▌Marvin Sandnes (Pacific Green) 3.4%

== Pennsylvania ==
District		Incumbent			This race	
Location	PVI	Member	Party	First elected	Results	Candidates
Pennsylvania 1	D+28	Bob Brady	Democratic	1998	Incumbent re-elected.	▌ ✓ Bob Brady (Democratic) 82.2%; ▌Deborah Williams (Republican) 17.8%
Pennsylvania 2	D+38	Vacant			Incumbent Chaka Fattah (D) resigned June 23, 2016. Democratic hold. Winner was also elected to fill unexpired term, see above.	▌ ✓ Dwight Evans (Democratic) 90.2%; ▌James Jones (Republican) 9.8%
Pennsylvania 3	R+8	Mike Kelly	Republican	2010	Incumbent re-elected.	▌ ✓ Mike Kelly (Republican) 100%
Pennsylvania 4	R+9	Scott Perry	Republican	2012	Incumbent re-elected.	▌ ✓ Scott Perry (Republican) 66.1%; ▌Joshua Burkholder (Democratic) 33.9%
Pennsylvania 5	R+8	Glenn Thompson	Republican	2008	Incumbent re-elected.	▌ ✓ Glenn Thompson (Republican) 67.2%; ▌Kerith Strano Taylor (Democratic) 32.8%
Pennsylvania 6	R+2	Ryan Costello	Republican	2014	Incumbent re-elected.	▌ ✓ Ryan Costello (Republican) 57.3%; ▌Mike Parrish (Democratic) 42.7%
Pennsylvania 7	R+2	Pat Meehan	Republican	2010	Incumbent re-elected.	▌ ✓ Pat Meehan (Republican) 59.5%; ▌Mary Ellen Balchunis (Democratic) 40.5%
Pennsylvania 8	R+1	Mike Fitzpatrick	Republican	2004; 2006 (defeated); 2010	Incumbent retired. Republican hold.	▌ ✓ Brian Fitzpatrick (Republican) 54.4%; ▌Steve Santarsiero (Democratic) 45.6%
Pennsylvania 9	R+14	Bill Shuster	Republican	2001 (special)	Incumbent re-elected.	▌ ✓ Bill Shuster (Republican) 63.4%; ▌Art Halvorson (Democratic) 36.6%
Pennsylvania 10	R+12	Tom Marino	Republican	2010	Incumbent re-elected.	▌ ✓ Tom Marino (Republican) 70.2%; ▌Mike Molesevich (Democratic) 29.8%
Pennsylvania 11	R+6	Lou Barletta	Republican	2010	Incumbent re-elected.	▌ ✓ Lou Barletta (Republican) 63.7%; ▌Michael Marsicano (Democratic) 36.3%
Pennsylvania 12	R+6	Keith Rothfus	Republican	2012	Incumbent re-elected.	▌ ✓ Keith Rothfus (Republican) 61.8%; ▌Erin McClelland (Democratic) 38.2%
Pennsylvania 13	D+13	Brendan Boyle	Democratic	2014	Incumbent re-elected.	▌ ✓ Brendan Boyle (Democratic) 100%
Pennsylvania 14	D+15	Mike Doyle	Democratic	1994	Incumbent re-elected.	▌ ✓ Mike Doyle (Democratic) 74.4%; ▌Lenny McAllister (Republican) 25.6%
Pennsylvania 15	R+2	Charlie Dent	Republican	2004	Incumbent re-elected.	▌ ✓ Charlie Dent (Republican) 58.4%; ▌Rick Daugherty (Democratic) 38.0%; ▌Paul Rizzo (Libertarian) 3.6%
Pennsylvania 16	R+4	Joe Pitts	Republican	1996	Incumbent retired. Republican hold.	▌ ✓ Lloyd Smucker (Republican) 53.8%; ▌Christina Hartman (Democratic) 42.9%; ▌Shawn House (Libertarian) 3.4%
Pennsylvania 17	D+4	Matt Cartwright	Democratic	2012	Incumbent re-elected.	▌ ✓ Matt Cartwright (Democratic) 53.8%; ▌Matt Connolly (Republican) 46.2%
Pennsylvania 18	R+10	Tim Murphy	Republican	2002	Incumbent re-elected.	▌ ✓ Tim Murphy (Republican) 100%

== Rhode Island ==
District		Incumbent			This race	
Location	PVI	Member	Party	First elected	Results	Candidates
Rhode Island 1	D+15	David Cicilline	Democratic	2010	Incumbent re-elected.	▌ ✓ David Cicilline (Democratic) 64.5%; ▌H. Russell Taub (Republican) 35.1%
Rhode Island 2	D+8	James Langevin	Democratic	2000	Incumbent re-elected.	▌ ✓ James Langevin (Democratic) 58.1%; ▌Rhue Reis (Republican) 30.7%; ▌Jeff Johnson (Independent) 7.1%; ▌Sal Caiozzo (Independent) 3.9%

== South Carolina ==
District		Incumbent			This race	
Location	PVI	Member	Party	First elected	Results	Candidates
South Carolina 1	R+11	Mark Sanford	Republican	1994; 2000 (retired); 2013 (special)	Incumbent re-elected	▌ ✓ Mark Sanford (Republican) 58.6%; ▌Dimitri Cherny (Democratic) 36.8%; ▌Michael Crier (Libertarian) 3.6%; ▌Albert Travison (American) 0.9%
South Carolina 2	R+16	Joe Wilson	Republican	2001 (special)	Incumbent re-elected	▌ ✓ Joe Wilson (Republican) 60.3%; ▌Arik Bjorn (Democratic) 35.9%; ▌Eddie McCain (American) 3.8%
South Carolina 3	R+18	Jeff Duncan	Republican	2010	Incumbent re-elected	▌ ✓ Jeff Duncan (Republican) 72.8%; ▌Hosea Cleveland (Democratic) 27.1%
South Carolina 4	R+15	Trey Gowdy	Republican	2010	Incumbent re-elected	▌ ✓ Trey Gowdy (Republican) 67.2%; ▌Chris Fedalei (Democratic) 31.0%; ▌Michael Chandler (Constitution) 1.7%
South Carolina 5	R+9	Mick Mulvaney	Republican	2010	Incumbent re-elected	▌ ✓ Mick Mulvaney (Republican) 59.2%; ▌Fran Person (Democratic) 38.7%; ▌Rudy Barnes (American) 2.0%
South Carolina 6	D+21	Jim Clyburn	Democratic	1992	Incumbent re-elected	▌ ✓ Jim Clyburn (Democratic) 70.1%; ▌Laura Sterling (Republican) 27.6%; ▌Rich Piotrowski (Libertarian) 1.2%; ▌Prince Mallory (Green) 1.0%
South Carolina 7	R+7	Tom Rice	Republican	2012	Incumbent re-elected	▌ ✓ Tom Rice (Republican) 61.0%; ▌Mal Hyman (Democratic) 39.0%

== South Dakota ==
District		Incumbent			This race	
Location	PVI	Member	Party	First elected	Results	Candidates
South Dakota at-large	R+10	Kristi Noem	Republican	2010	Incumbent re-elected.	▌ ✓ Kristi Noem (Republican) 64.1% ▌Paula Hawks (Democratic) 35.9%

== Tennessee ==
District		Incumbent			This race	
Location	PVI	Member	Party	First elected	Results	Candidates
Tennessee 1	R+25	Phil Roe	Republican	2008	Incumbent re-elected.	▌ ✓ Phil Roe (Republican) 78.4%; ▌Alam Bohms (Democratic) 15.4%; ▌Robert Franklin (Independent) 6.2%
Tennessee 2	R+20	Jimmy Duncan	Republican	1988	Incumbent re-elected.	▌ ✓ Jimmy Duncan (Republican) 75.6%; ▌Stuart Starr (Democratic) 24.4%
Tennessee 3	R+16	Chuck Fleischmann	Republican	2010	Incumbent re-elected.	▌ ✓ Chuck Fleischmann (Republican) 66.4%; ▌Melody Shekari (Democratic) 28.8%; ▌Rick Tyler (Independent) 1.9%; ▌Cassandra Mitchell (Independent) 1.9%; ▌Topher Kersting (Independent) 0.9%
Tennessee 4	R+18	Scott DesJarlais	Republican	2010	Incumbent re-elected.	▌ ✓ Scott DesJarlais (Republican) 65.0%; ▌Steven Reynolds (Democratic) 35.0%
Tennessee 5	D+5	Jim Cooper	Democratic	1982; 1994 (retired); 2002	Incumbent re-elected.	▌ ✓ Jim Cooper (Democratic) 62.6%; ▌Stacy Snyder (Republican) 37.4%
Tennessee 6	R+21	Diane Black	Republican	2010	Incumbent re-elected.	▌ ✓ Diane Black (Republican) 71.1%; ▌David Kent (Democratic) 21.8%; ▌David Ross (Independent) 7.1%
Tennessee 7	R+18	Marsha Blackburn	Republican	2002	Incumbent re-elected.	▌ ✓ Marsha Blackburn (Republican) 72.2%; ▌Tharon Chandler (Democratic) 23.5%; ▌Leonard Ladner (Independent) 4.3%
Tennessee 8	R+19	Stephen Fincher	Republican	2010	Incumbent retired. Republican hold.	▌ ✓ David Kustoff (Republican) 68.8%; ▌Rickey Hobson (Democratic) 25.1%; ▌Shelia Godwin (Independent) 2.3%; ▌James Hart (Independent) 1.4%; Others: ▌Adrian Montague (Independent) 0.9%; ▌Mark Rawles (Independent) 0.9%; ▌Karen Talley-Lane (Independent) 0.7%
Tennessee 9	D+25	Steve Cohen	Democratic	2006	Incumbent re-elected.	▌ ✓ Steve Cohen (Democratic) 78.7%; ▌Wayne Alberson (Republican) 18.9%; ▌Paul Cook (Independent) 2.4%

== Texas ==
District		Incumbent			This race	
Location	PVI	Member	Party	First elected	Results	Candidates
Texas 1	R+24	Louie Gohmert	Republican	2004	Incumbent re-elected.	▌ ✓ Louie Gohmert (Republican) 73.9%; ▌Shirley McKellar (Democratic) 24.1%; ▌Phil Gray (Libertarian) 1.9%
Texas 2	R+16	Ted Poe	Republican	2004	Incumbent re-elected.	▌ ✓ Ted Poe (Republican) 60.6%; ▌Pat Bryan (Democratic) 36.0%; ▌James Veasaw (Libertarian) 2.3%; ▌Joshua Darr (Green) 1.0%
Texas 3	R+17	Sam Johnson	Republican	1991	Incumbent re-elected.	▌ ✓ Sam Johnson (Republican) 61.2%; ▌Adam Bell (Democratic) 34.6%; ▌Scott Jameson (Libertarian) 3.3%; ▌Paul Blair (Green) 0.9%
Texas 4	R+25	John Ratcliffe	Republican	2014	Incumbent re-elected.	▌ ✓ John Ratcliffe (Republican) 88.0%; ▌Cody Wommack (Libertarian) 12.0%
Texas 5	R+17	Jeb Hensarling	Republican	2002	Incumbent re-elected.	▌ ✓ Jeb Hensarling (Republican) 80.6%; ▌Ken Ashby (Libertarian) 19.4%
Texas 6	R+11	Joe Barton	Republican	1984	Incumbent re-elected.	▌ ✓ Joe Barton (Republican) 58.3%; ▌Ruby Fay Woolridge (Democratic) 39.0%; ▌Darrel Smith (Green) 2.6%
Texas 7	R+13	John Culberson	Republican	2000	Incumbent re-elected.	▌ ✓ John Culberson (Republican) 56.2%; ▌James Cargas (Democratic) 43.8%
Texas 8	R+29	Kevin Brady	Republican	1996	Incumbent re-elected.	▌ ✓ Kevin Brady (Republican) 100%
Texas 9	D+25	Al Green	Democratic	2004	Incumbent re-elected.	▌ ✓ Al Green (Democratic) 80.6%; ▌Jeff Martin (Republican) 19.4%
Texas 10	R+11	Michael McCaul	Republican	2004	Incumbent re-elected.	▌ ✓ Michael McCaul (Republican) 57.3%; ▌Tawana Walter-Cadien (Democratic) 38.4%; ▌Bill Kelsey (Libertarian) 4.2%
Texas 11	R+31	Mike Conaway	Republican	2004	Incumbent re-elected.	▌ ✓ Mike Conaway (Republican) 89.5%; ▌Nicholas Landholt (Libertarian) 10.5%
Texas 12	R+19	Kay Granger	Republican	1996	Incumbent re-elected.	▌ ✓ Kay Granger (Republican) 69.4%; ▌Bill Bradshaw (Democratic) 26.9%; ▌Ed Colliver (Libertarian) 3.8%
Texas 13	R+32	Mac Thornberry	Republican	1994	Incumbent re-elected.	▌ ✓ Mac Thornberry (Republican) 90.0%; ▌Calvin DeWeese (Libertarian) 6.7%; ▌Rusty Tomlinson (Green) 3.4%
Texas 14	R+12	Randy Weber	Republican	2012	Incumbent re-elected.	▌ ✓ Randy Weber (Republican) 61.9%; ▌Michael Cole (Democratic) 38.1%
Texas 15	D+5	Rubén Hinojosa	Democratic	1996	Incumbent retired. Democratic hold.	▌ ✓ Vicente Gonzalez (Democratic) 57.3%; ▌Tim Westley (Republican) 37.7%; ▌Vanessa Tijerina (Green) 3.1%; ▌Ross Leone (Libertarian) 1.9%
Texas 16	D+12	Beto O'Rourke	Democratic	2012	Incumbent re-elected.	▌ ✓ Beto O'Rourke (Democratic) 85.7%; ▌Jaime Perez (Libertarian) 10.0%; ▌Mary Gourdoux (Green) 4.3%
Texas 17	R+13	Bill Flores	Republican	2010	Incumbent re-elected.	▌ ✓ Bill Flores (Republican) 60.8%; ▌William Matta (Democratic) 35.2%; ▌Clark Patterson (Libertarian) 4.0%
Texas 18	D+24	Sheila Jackson Lee	Democratic	1994	Incumbent re-elected.	▌ ✓ Sheila Jackson Lee (Democratic) 73.5%; ▌Lori Bartley (Republican) 23.6%; ▌Thomas Kleven (Green) 2.9%
Texas 19	R+26	Randy Neugebauer	Republican	2003	Incumbent retired. Republican hold.	▌ ✓ Jodey Arrington (Republican) 86.7%; ▌Troy Bonar (Libertarian) 8.5%; ▌Mark Lawson (Green) 4.8%
Texas 20	D+6	Joaquin Castro	Democratic	2012	Incumbent re-elected.	▌ ✓ Joaquin Castro (Democratic) 79.7%; ▌Jeffrey Blunt (Libertarian) 15.5%; ▌Paul Pipkin (Green) 4.8%
Texas 21	R+12	Lamar Smith	Republican	1986	Incumbent re-elected.	▌ ✓ Lamar Smith (Republican) 57.0%; ▌Tom Wakely (Democratic) 36.5%; ▌Mark Loewe (Libertarian) 4.1%; ▌Tony Diaz (Green) 2.4%
Texas 22	R+15	Pete Olson	Republican	2008	Incumbent re-elected.	▌ ✓ Pete Olson (Republican) 59.5%; ▌Mark Gibson (Democratic) 40.5%
Texas 23	R+3	Will Hurd	Republican	2014	Incumbent re-elected.	▌ ✓ Will Hurd (Republican) 48.3%; ▌Pete Gallego (Democratic) 47.0%; ▌Ruben Corvalan (Libertarian) 4.7%
Texas 24	R+13	Kenny Marchant	Republican	2004	Incumbent re-elected.	▌ ✓ Kenny Marchant (Republican) 56.2%; ▌Jan McDowell (Democratic) 39.3%; ▌Mike Kolls (Libertarian) 3.1%; ▌Kevin McCormick (Green) 1.4%
Texas 25	R+12	Roger Williams	Republican	2012	Incumbent re-elected.	▌ ✓ Roger Williams (Republican) 58.4%; ▌Kathi Thomas (Democratic) 37.7%; ▌Loren Schneiderman (Libertarian) 3.9%
Texas 26	R+20	Michael C. Burgess	Republican	2002	Incumbent re-elected.	▌ ✓ Michael C. Burgess (Republican) 66.4%; ▌Eric Mauck (Democratic) 29.6%; ▌Mark Boler (Libertarian) 4.0%
Texas 27	R+13	Blake Farenthold	Republican	2010	Incumbent re-elected.	▌ ✓ Blake Farenthold (Republican) 61.7%; ▌Roy Barrera (Democratic) 38.3%
Texas 28	D+7	Henry Cuellar	Democratic	2004	Incumbent re-elected.	▌ ✓ Henry Cuellar (Democratic) 66.2%; ▌Zeffen Hardin (Republican) 31.3%; ▌Michael Cary (Green) 2.5%
Texas 29	D+12	Gene Green	Democratic	1992	Incumbent re-elected.	▌ ✓ Gene Green (Democratic) 72.5%; ▌Julio Garza (Republican) 24.0%; ▌Ruben Perez (Libertarian) 2.5%; ▌James Partsch-Galvan (Green) 1.1%
Texas 30	D+27	Eddie Bernice Johnson	Democratic	1992	Incumbent re-elected.	▌ ✓ Eddie Bernice Johnson (Democratic) 77.9%; ▌Charles Lingerfelt (Republican) 19.0%; ▌Jarrett Woods (Libertarian) 2.2%; ▌Thom Prentice (Green) 0.9%
Texas 31	R+12	John Carter	Republican	2002	Incumbent re-elected.	▌ ✓ John Carter (Republican) 58.4%; ▌Mike Clark (Democratic) 36.5%; ▌Scott Ballard (Libertarian) 5.2%
Texas 32	R+10	Pete Sessions	Republican	1996	Incumbent re-elected.	▌ ✓ Pete Sessions (Republican) 71.1%; ▌Ed Rankin (Libertarian) 19.0%; ▌Gary Stuard (Green) 10.0%
Texas 33	D+18	Marc Veasey	Democratic	2012	Incumbent re-elected.	▌ ✓ Marc Veasey (Democratic) 73.7%; ▌Mark Mitchell (Republican) 26.3%
Texas 34	D+8	Filemon Vela Jr.	Democratic	2012	Incumbent re-elected.	▌ ✓ Filemon Vela Jr. (Democratic) 62.7%; ▌Rey Gonzalez (Republican) 37.3%
Texas 35	D+11	Lloyd Doggett	Democratic	1994	Incumbent re-elected.	▌ ✓ Lloyd Doggett (Democratic) 63.1%; ▌Susan Narvaiz (Republican) 31.6%; ▌Rhett Smith (Libertarian) 3.3%; ▌Scott Trimble (Green) 2.1%
Texas 36	R+25	Brian Babin	Republican	2014	Incumbent re-elected.	▌ ✓ Brian Babin (Republican) 88.6%; ▌Hal Ridley (Green) 11.4%

== Utah ==
District		Incumbent			This race	
Location	PVI	Member	Party	First elected	Results	Candidates
Utah 1	R+27	Rob Bishop	Republican	2002	Incumbent re-elected.	▌ ✓ Rob Bishop (Republican) 65.9%; ▌Peter Clemens (Democratic) 26.4%; ▌Craig Bowden (Libertarian) 5.9%; ▌Chadwick Fairbanks (Unaffiliated) 1.7%
Utah 2	R+18	Chris Stewart	Republican	2012	Incumbent re-elected.	▌ ✓ Chris Stewart (Republican) 61.6%; ▌Charlene Albarran (Democratic) 33.9%; ▌Paul McCollaum (Constitution) 4.5%
Utah 3	R+28	Jason Chaffetz	Republican	2008	Incumbent re-elected.	▌ ✓ Jason Chaffetz (Republican) 73.5%; ▌Stephen Tryon (Democratic) 26.5%
Utah 4	R+16	Mia Love	Republican	2014	Incumbent re-elected.	▌ ✓ Mia Love (Republican) 53.8%; ▌Doug Owens (Democratic) 41.3%; ▌Collin Simonsen (Constitution) 4.9%

== Vermont ==
District		Incumbent			This race	
Location	PVI	Member	Party	First elected	Results	Candidates
Vermont at-large	D+16	Peter Welch	Democratic	2006	Incumbent re-elected.	▌ ✓ Peter Welch (Democratic) 82.5%; ▌Erica Clawson (Liberty Union) 9.2%

== Virginia ==
District		Incumbent			This race	
Location	PVI	Member	Party	First elected	Results	Candidates
Virginia 1	R+8	Rob Wittman	Republican	2007	Incumbent re-elected.	▌ ✓ Rob Wittman (Republican) 59.9%; ▌Matt Rowe (Democratic) 36.6%; ▌Gail Parker (Independent) 3.4%
Virginia 2	R+4	Scott Rigell	Republican	2010	Incumbent retired. Republican hold.	▌ ✓ Scott Taylor (Republican) 61.3%; ▌Shaun Brown (Democratic) 38.5%
Virginia 2	R+4	Randy Forbes; Redistricted from the 4th district	Republican	2001 (special)	Incumbent lost renomination. Republican loss.	▌ ✓ Scott Taylor (Republican) 61.3%; ▌Shaun Brown (Democratic) 38.5%
Virginia 3	D+15	Bobby Scott	Democratic	1992	Incumbent re-elected.	▌ ✓ Bobby Scott (Democratic) 66.7%; ▌Marty Williams (Republican) 33.1%
Virginia 4	D+8	None (New seat)			New seat. Democratic gain.	▌ ✓ Donald McEachin (Democratic) 57.7%; ▌Mike Wade (Republican) 42.0%
Virginia 5	R+5	Robert Hurt	Republican	2010	Incumbent retired. Republican hold.	▌ ✓ Tom Garrett (Republican) 58.2%; ▌Jane Dittmar (Democratic) 41.6%
Virginia 6	R+12	Bob Goodlatte	Republican	1992	Incumbent re-elected.	▌ ✓ Bob Goodlatte (Republican) 66.6%; ▌Kai Degner (Democratic) 33.2%
Virginia 7	R+8	Dave Brat	Republican	2014	Incumbent re-elected.	▌ ✓ Dave Brat (Republican) 57.5%; ▌Eileen Bedell (Democratic) 42.2%
Virginia 8	D+16	Don Beyer	Democratic	2014	Incumbent re-elected.	▌ ✓ Don Beyer (Democratic) 68.4%; ▌Charles Hernick (Republican) 27.3%; ▌Julio Gracia (Independent) 4.1%
Virginia 9	R+15	Morgan Griffith	Republican	2010	Incumbent re-elected.	▌ ✓ Morgan Griffith (Republican) 68.6%; ▌Derek Kitts (Democratic) 28.3%; ▌Janice Boyd (Independent) 2.9%
Virginia 10	R+2	Barbara Comstock	Republican	2014	Incumbent re-elected.	▌ ✓ Barbara Comstock (Republican) 52.7%; ▌LuAnn Bennett (Democratic) 46.9%
Virginia 11	D+10	Gerry Connolly	Democratic	2008	Incumbent re-elected.	▌ ✓ Gerry Connolly (Democratic) 87.9%

== Washington ==
District		Incumbent			This race	
Location	PVI	Member	Party	First elected	Results	Candidates
Washington 1	D+4	Suzan DelBene	Democratic	2012	Incumbent re-elected.	▌ ✓ Suzan DelBene (Democratic) 55.4%; ▌Robert Sutherland (Republican) 44.6%
Washington 2	D+8	Rick Larsen	Democratic	2000	Incumbent re-elected.	▌ ✓ Rick Larsen (Democratic) 64.0%; ▌Marc Hennemann (Republican) 36.0%
Washington 3	R+2	Jaime Herrera Beutler	Republican	2010	Incumbent re-elected.	▌ ✓ Jaime Herrera Beutler (Republican) 61.8%; ▌Jim Moeller (Democratic) 38.2%
Washington 4	R+13	Dan Newhouse	Republican	2014	Incumbent re-elected.	▌ ✓ Dan Newhouse (Republican) 57.6%; ▌Clint Didier (Republican) 42.4%
Washington 5	R+7	Cathy McMorris Rodgers	Republican	2004	Incumbent re-elected.	▌ ✓ Cathy McMorris Rodgers (Republican) 59.6%; ▌Joe Pakootas (Democratic) 40.4%
Washington 6	D+5	Derek Kilmer	Democratic	2012	Incumbent re-elected.	▌ ✓ Derek Kilmer (Democratic) 61.5%; ▌Todd Bloom (Republican) 38.5%
Washington 7	D+29	Jim McDermott	Democratic	1988	Incumbent retired. Democratic hold.	▌ ✓ Pramila Jayapal (Democratic) 56.0%; ▌Brady Walkinshaw (Democratic) 44.0%
Washington 8	R+1	Dave Reichert	Republican	2004	Incumbent re-elected.	▌ ✓ Dave Reichert (Republican) 60.2%; ▌Tony Ventrella (Democratic) 39.8%
Washington 9	D+17	Adam Smith	Democratic	1996	Incumbent re-elected.	▌ ✓ Adam Smith (Democratic) 72.9%; ▌Doug Basler (Republican) 27.1%
Washington 10	D+5	Dennis Heck	Democratic	2012	Incumbent re-elected.	▌ ✓ Denny Heck (Democratic) 58.7%; ▌Jim Postma (Republican) 41.3%

== West Virginia ==
District		Incumbent			This race	
Location	PVI	Member	Party	First elected	Results	Candidates
West Virginia 1	R+14	David McKinley	Republican	2010	Incumbent re-elected.	▌ ✓ David McKinley (Republican) 69.0%; ▌Mike Manypenny (Democratic) 31.0%
West Virginia 2	R+11	Alex Mooney	Republican	2014	Incumbent re-elected.	▌ ✓ Alex Mooney (Republican) 58.2%; ▌Mark Hunt (Democratic) 41.8%
West Virginia 3	R+14	Evan Jenkins	Republican	2014	Incumbent re-elected.	▌ ✓ Evan Jenkins (Republican) 67.9%; ▌Matt Detch (Democratic) 24.0%; ▌Zane Lawhorn (Libertarian) 8.1%

== Wisconsin ==
District		Incumbent			This race	
Location	PVI	Member	Party	First elected	Results	Candidates
Wisconsin 1	R+3	Paul Ryan	Republican	1998	Incumbent re-elected.	▌ ✓ Paul Ryan (Republican) 65.0%; ▌Ryan Solen (Democratic) 30.2%; ▌Spencer Zimmerman (Independent) 2.7%; ▌Jason LeBeck (Libertarian) 2.1%
Wisconsin 2	D+17	Mark Pocan	Democratic	2012	Incumbent re-elected.	▌ ✓ Mark Pocan (Democratic) 68.7%; ▌Peter Theron (Republican) 31.2%
Wisconsin 3	D+5	Ron Kind	Democratic	1996	Incumbent re-elected.	▌ ✓ Ron Kind (Democratic) 98.9%
Wisconsin 4	D+23	Gwen Moore	Democratic	2004	Incumbent re-elected.	▌ ✓ Gwen Moore (Democratic) 76.7%; ▌Robert Raymond (Independent) 11.7%; ▌Andy Craig (Libertarian) 11.2%
Wisconsin 5	R+13	Jim Sensenbrenner	Republican	1978	Incumbent re-elected.	▌ ✓ Jim Sensenbrenner (Republican) 66.7%; ▌Khary Penebaker (Democratic) 29.3%; ▌John Arndt (Libertarian) 3.9%
Wisconsin 6	R+5	Glenn Grothman	Republican	2014	Incumbent re-elected.	▌ ✓ Glenn Grothman (Republican) 57.2%; ▌Sarah Lloyd (Democratic) 37.3%; ▌Jeff Dahlke (Independent) 5.5%
Wisconsin 7	R+2	Sean Duffy	Republican	2010	Incumbent re-elected.	▌ ✓ Sean Duffy (Republican) 61.7%; ▌Mary Hoeft (Democratic) 38.3%
Wisconsin 8	R+2	Reid Ribble	Republican	2010	Incumbent retired. Republican hold.	▌ ✓ Mike Gallagher (Republican) 62.7%; ▌Tom Nelson (Democratic) 37.3%

== Wyoming ==
District		Incumbent			This race	
Location	PVI	Member	Party	First elected	Results	Candidates
Wyoming at-large	R+22	Cynthia Lummis	Republican	2008	Incumbent retired. Republican hold.	▌ ✓ Liz Cheney (Republican) 60.3%; ▌Ryan Greene (Democratic) 29.2%; ▌Daniel Cummings (Constitution) 4.0%; ▌Lawrence Struempf (Libertarian) 3.5%

== Non-voting delegates ==
District	Incumbent			This race	
District	Delegate	Party	First elected	Results	Candidates
American Samoa at-large	Aumua Amata Radewagen	Republican	2014	Incumbent re-elected.	▌ ✓ Aumua Amata Radewagen (Republican) 75.4%; ▌Salu Hunkin-Finau (Democratic) 13.4%; ▌Mapu Jamias (Democratic) 8.3%; ▌Meleagi Suitonu-Chapman (Democratic) 1.5%
District of Columbia at-large	Eleanor Holmes Norton	Democratic	1990	Incumbent re-elected.	▌ ✓ Eleanor Holmes Norton (Democratic) 88.1%; ▌Martin Moulton (Libertarian) 6.2%; ▌Natale Stracuzzi (DC Statehood Green) 4.8%
Guam at-large	Madeleine Bordallo	Democratic	2002	Incumbent re-elected.	▌ ✓ Madeleine Bordallo (Democratic) 53.7%; ▌Felix Camacho (Republican) 45.7%
Northern Mariana Islands at-large	Gregorio Sablan	Independent	2008	Incumbent re-elected.	▌ ✓ Gregorio Sablan (Independent)
Puerto Rico at-large	Pedro Pierluisi	New Progressive/ Democratic	2008	Incumbent retired to run for Governor. New resident commissioner elected. New Progressive hold/Republican gain.	▌ ✓ Jenniffer González (PNP/Republican) 48.8%; ▌Héctor Ferrer (PPD/Democratic) 47.2%; ▌Hugo Rodríguez (PIP) 2.7%; ▌Mariana Nogales Molinelli (PPT) 1.3%
United States Virgin Islands at-large	Stacey Plaskett	Democratic	2014	Incumbent re-elected.	▌ ✓ Stacey Plaskett (Democratic)

== See also ==
- 2016 United States elections
  - 2016 United States gubernatorial elections
  - 2016 United States presidential election
  - 2016 United States Senate elections
- 114th United States Congress
- 115th United States Congress
