= Colin Bonini =

American politician (born 1965)

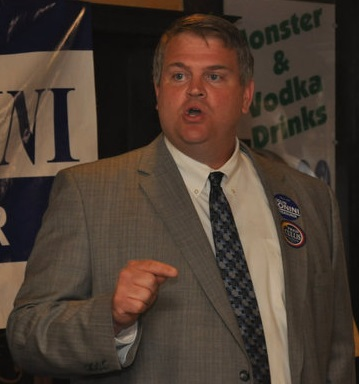

Member of the Delaware Senate from the 16th district
- In office November 9, 1994 – November 9, 2022
- Preceded by: William Torbert
- Succeeded by: Eric Buckson

Personal details
- Born: Colin Rafferty Marie Jude Bonini; April 14, 1965 (age 61) Stanford, California, U.S.
- Party: Republican
- Spouse: Melissa Harrington (m. 2001)
- Education: Wesley College (BA); University of Delaware (MPA)

Colin Rafferty Marie Jude Bonini (born April 14, 1965) is an American politician and a Republican former member of the Delaware Senate, where he represented the 16th District from 1994 to 2022.

== Education ==
Bonini received his Bachelor of Arts from Wesley College in 1991. He received a Master of Public Administration from the University of Delaware in 1999. While in college, he worked for United States Senator Bill Roth and the United States Department of State in New Delhi, India.

== Political career ==
He was elected in 1994 to represent the 16th District in the Delaware Senate. The district covers part of southern and eastern Kent County along with a small portion of adjacent Sussex County. It includes the southern portions of Dover around the Dover Air Force Base and the towns of Frederica and Harrington.

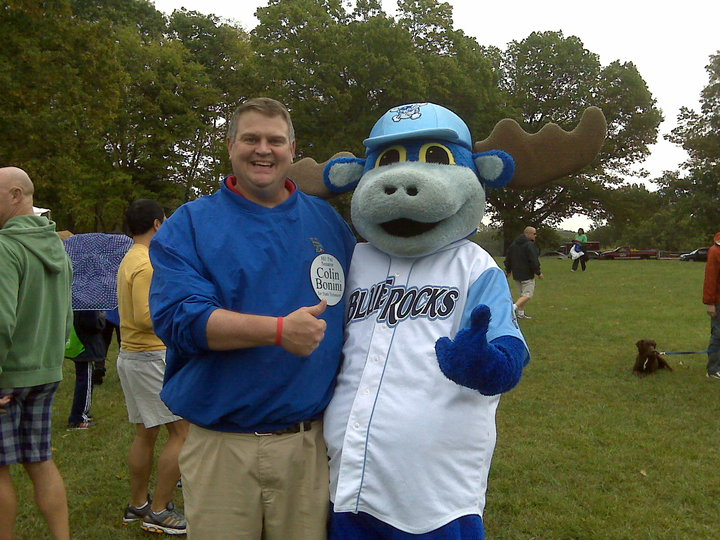
Bonini with Wilmington Blue Rocks' mascot Rocky Bluewinkle

In 2010, Bonini unsuccessfully ran for state treasurer, losing to Democrat Chip Flowers. Flowers received 51 percent of the vote to defeat Bonini by 6,121 votes.

Shortly after the 2014 elections, Bonini announced he would run for governor in the 2016 election to fix "significant systemic and fundamental problems" in the state. Bonini competed with former state trooper Lacey Lafferty in the Republican primary election, which he won with 70% of the vote. He lost to U.S. Congressman John Carney in the general election, garnering less than 40% of the vote. In 2020, Bonini again tried to run for governor but lost in the Republican primary to Julianne Murray, earning less than 35% of the vote. On September 13, 2022, Bonini was defeated in the Republican primary, finishing last place in a 3-way race.

In 2024, Bonini announced he was running for the Kent County Register of Wills in 2024. He won in the Republican primary elections for Kent County register of wills, defeating Susanne Whitney of Magnolia with 59.26% of the vote, 4,210 to 2,894. He received 3,431 machine votes, 523 early votes and 256 absentee votes.

== Electoral history ==
2010 Delaware State Treasurer election
Party	Candidate	Votes	%
Democratic	Chip Flowers	153,203	51.03
Republican	Colin Bonini	147,031	48.97
Democratic hold			

2016 Delaware gubernatorial election, Republican primary
Party	Candidate	Votes	%
Republican	Colin Bonini	21,150	69.88
Republican	Lacey Lafferty	9,115	30.12
Total votes		30,265	100.00

2016 Delaware gubernatorial election
Party	Candidate	Votes	%
Democratic	John Carney	248,404	58.34
Republican	Colin Bonini	166,852	39.18
Green	Andrew Groff	5,951	1.39
Libertarian	Sean Louis Goward	4,577	1.09
Total votes		425,784	100.00
Democratic hold			

2020 Delaware gubernatorial election, Republican primary
Party	Candidate	Votes	%
Republican	Julianne Murray	22,819	41.15
Republican	Colin Bonini	19,161	34.56
Republican	Bryant Richardson	4,262	7.69
Republican	Scott Walker	3,998	7.21
Republican	David Bosco	3,660	6.60
Republican	David Graham	1,547	2.79
Total votes		55,447	100.00

2022 Delaware Senate 16th district election, Republican primary
Party	Candidate	Votes	%
Republican	Eric Buckson	1,915	51.11%
Republican	Kim Petters	1,017	27.14%
Republican	Colin Bonini (incumbent)	815	21.75%
Total votes		3,747	100%

Delaware Senate
Preceded by William Torbert	Member of the Delaware Senate from the 16th district 1994–2022	Succeeded by Eric Buckson
Party political offices
Preceded by Jeff Cragg	Republican nominee for Governor of Delaware; 2016	Succeeded by Julianne Murray
