= Eric Buckson =

American politician

Member of the Delaware Senate from the 16th district
- Incumbent
- Assumed office November 9, 2022
- Preceded by: Colin Bonini

Personal details
- Born: Eric L. Buckson Camden, Delaware, U.S.
- Party: Republican
- Spouse: Jennifer
- Children: 4
- Parent(s): David P. Buckson; Patricia Maloney
- Education: Caesar Rodney High School; University of Delaware
- Profession: Politician

Eric L. Buckson is an American politician and former public school teacher who has represented the 16th District in the Delaware Senate since 2022. Buckson was a commissioner on the Kent County Levy Court from 2006 until 2022.

== Early life ==
Buckson is a lifelong resident of Kent County. He graduated from Caesar Rodney High School in 1983 and the University of Delaware in 1988 with a bachelor’s degree in health and physical education. In 1990, Buckson earned a master's degree in sport management.

After college, Buckson was hired as a physical education instructor and wrestling coach at Polytech High School. He retired from teaching in 2022.

== Career in politics ==
Buckson served on the Kent County Levy Court from 2006 until 2022. He ran for election to the Delaware Senate in 2022, defeating long-time incumbent Colin Bonini in a three-way Republican primary. He was uncontested in the general election.

In 2024, Buckson was re-elected to the Delaware Senate after defeating independent write-in candidate William McVay with 98.9% of the vote. In the Senate, Buckson is a member of the Education, Elections & Government Affairs, Environment, Energy & Transportation, Finance, Health & Social Services, Housing, and Veterans Affairs committees.

In the Delaware Senate, Buckson's stated priorities include ending government overreach, promoting vocational education, improving infrastructure and roads, supporting public safety and veterans, and protecting agriculture and bayshore communities.

== Family life ==
Buckson is the son of David P. Buckson (1920–2017), who held several prominent positions in Delaware, including lieutenant governor, attorney general, and briefly governor. He served as governor for 19 days following the resignation of J. Caleb Boggs, who left office after being elected to the United States Senate.

Buckson, who lives in Camden, Delaware, is married and has four children.

Delaware Senate
| Preceded by Colin Bonini | Member of the Delaware Senate from the 16th district 2022–present | Incumbent |
