= 2016 United States gubernatorial elections =

- November 8, 2016

14 governorships 12 states; 2 territories (Note: Including a special election in Oregon) (Note: Alaska's governorship was held by an independent, so the number of seats held by Democrats and Republicans added up to only 49.)
	Majority party	Minority party
Party	Republican	Democratic
Seats before	31	18
Seats after	33	16
Seat change	▲2	▼2
Popular vote	9,688,153	9,288,363
Percentage	49.48%	47.44%
Seats up	4	8
Seats won	6	6
- Map of the results Democratic hold Democratic gain Republican hold Republican gain New Progressive gain Nonpartisan politician No election

United States gubernatorial elections were held on November 8, 2016, in 12 states and two territories. The last regular gubernatorial elections for nine of the 12 states took place in 2012. The last gubernatorial elections for New Hampshire, Oregon, and Vermont took place in 2014, as Oregon held a special election due to the resignation of Governor John Kitzhaber, while the governors of New Hampshire and Vermont both serve two-year terms. The 2016 gubernatorial elections took place concurrently with several other federal, state, and local elections, including the presidential election, Senate, and House elections.

The Republican Party won open Democrat-held governorships in Vermont, New Hampshire, and Missouri; and they also held their open seats in Indiana and North Dakota, increasing its total to 33. Democrats finished with 16 governorships, defeating incumbent Pat McCrory in North Carolina and holding open seats in Delaware and West Virginia, with one independent governor in Alaska accounting for the 50th gubernatorial seat.

However, Governor Jim Justice of West Virginia switched his party affiliation to Republican shortly after his inauguration, thereby increasing the number of Republican governors to 34, tying their record set in the 1921 United States gubernatorial elections. As of 2026, this is the last time that Democrats won gubernatorial elections in Montana and West Virginia.

== Election predictions ==
Several sites and individuals publish predictions of competitive seats. These predictions look at factors such as the strength of the incumbent (if the incumbent is running for re-election), the strength of the candidates, and the partisan leanings of the state (reflected in part by the state's Cook Partisan Voting Index rating). The predictions assign ratings to each state, with the rating indicating the predicted advantage that a party has in winning that seat.

Most election predictors use:

- "tossup": no advantage
- "tilt" (used by some predictors): advantage that is not quite as strong as "lean"
- "lean": slight advantage
- "likely": significant, but surmountable, advantage
- "safe" or "solid": near-certain chance of victory

State	PVI	Incumbent	Last race	Cook Aug 12, 2016	IE Nov 3, 2016	Sabato Nov 7, 2016	RCP Nov 6, 2016	DKE Nov 8, 2016	Gov Nov 7, 2016	Result
Delaware	D+8	Jack Markell (term-limited)	69.3% D	Solid D	Solid D	Safe D	Safe D	Safe D	Safe D	Carney; 58.3% D
Indiana	R+5	Mike Pence (withdrew)	49.6% R	Tossup	Tilt R	Lean D (flip)	Tossup	Tossup	Tossup	Holcomb; 51.4% R
Missouri	R+5	Jay Nixon (term-limited)	54.6% D	Tossup	Tossup	Lean R (flip)	Tossup	Tossup	Tossup	Greitens; 51.1% R (flip)
Montana	R+7	Steve Bullock	48.9% D	Lean D	Lean D	Lean D	Lean D	Lean D	Tossup	Bullock; 50.3% D
New Hampshire	D+1	Maggie Hassan (retiring)	52.6% D	Tossup	Tossup	Lean D	Tossup	Tossup	Tossup	Sununu; 48.8% R (flip)
North Carolina	R+3	Pat McCrory	54.7% R	Tossup	Tilt D (flip)	Lean D (flip)	Tossup	Tossup	Tossup	Cooper; 49.0% D (flip)
North Dakota	R+10	Jack Dalrymple (retiring)	63.1% R	Solid R	Solid R	Safe R	Safe R	Safe R	Safe R	Burgum; 76.5% R
Oregon (special)	D+5	Kate Brown	49.5% D	Likely D	Solid D	Safe D	Likely D	Safe D	Safe D	Brown; 50.6% D
Utah	R+22	Gary Herbert	68.3% R	Solid R	Solid R	Safe R	Safe R	Safe R	Safe R	Herbert; 66.7% R
Vermont	D+18	Peter Shumlin (retiring)	46.4% D	Tossup	Tilt R (flip)	Lean R (flip)	Tossup	Tossup	Tossup	Scott; 52.9% R (flip)
Washington	D+5	Jay Inslee	51.5% D	Solid D	Solid D	Safe D	Lean D	Safe D	Likely D	Inslee; 54.2% D
West Virginia	R+13	Earl Ray Tomblin (term-limited)	50.4% D	Tossup	Tilt D	Lean D	Lean R (flip)	Tossup	Tossup	Justice; 49.1% D

== Race summary ==
=== States ===
State	Incumbent	Party	First elected	Result	Candidates
Delaware	Jack Markell	Democratic	2008	Incumbent term-limited. New governor elected. Democratic hold	▌ ✓ John Carney (Democratic) 58.3%; ▌Colin Bonini (Republican) 39.2%; ▌Andrew Groff (Green) 1.4%; ▌Sean Louis Goward (Libertarian) 1.1%
Indiana	Mike Pence	Republican	2012	Incumbent renominated but withdrew. New governor elected. Republican hold.	▌ ✓ Eric Holcomb (Republican) 51.4%; ▌John R. Gregg (Democratic) 45.4%; ▌Rex Bell (Libertarian) 3.2%
Missouri	Jay Nixon	Democratic	2008	Incumbent term-limited. New governor elected. Republican gain	▌ ✓ Eric Greitens (Republican) 51.1%; ▌Chris Koster (Democratic) 45.6%; ▌Cisse Spragins (Libertarian) 1.5%; ▌Don Fitz (Green) 0.75%
Montana	Steve Bullock	Democratic	2012	Incumbent re-elected.	▌ ✓ Steve Bullock (Democratic) 50.3%; ▌Greg Gianforte (Republican) 46.4%; ▌Ted Dunlap (Libertarian) 3.4%
New Hampshire	Maggie Hassan	Democratic	2012	Incumbent retired to run in the U.S. Senate. New governor elected. Republican gain.	▌ ✓ Chris Sununu (Republican) 48.8%; ▌Colin Van Ostern (Democratic) 46.6%; ▌Max Abramson (Libertarian) 4.3%
North Carolina	Pat McCrory	Republican	2012	Incumbent lost re-election. New governor elected. Democratic gain.	▌ ✓ Roy Cooper (Democratic) 49.0%; ▌Pat McCrory (Republican) 48.8%; ▌Lon Cecil (Libertarian) 2.2%
North Dakota	Jack Dalrymple	Republican	2010 (Note: Dalrymple took office after his predecessor (John Hoeven) resigned.)	Incumbent retired. New governor elected. Republican hold.	▌ ✓ Doug Burgum (Republican) 76.5%; ▌Marvin Nelson (Democratic–NPL) 19.4%; ▌Marty Riske (Libertarian) 3.9%
Oregon	Kate Brown	Democratic	2015	Incumbent elected to finish term.	▌ ✓ Kate Brown (Democratic) 50.6%; ▌Bud Pierce (Republican) 43.6%; ▌James Foster (Libertarian) 2.3%; ▌Aaron Donald Auer (Constitution) 1.0%
Utah	Gary Herbert	Republican	2009 (Note: Herbert took office after his predecessor (Jon Huntsman Jr.) resigned. He was subsequently elected in the 2010 Utah gubernatorial special election.)	Incumbent re-elected.	▌ ✓ Gary Herbert (Republican) 66.7%; ▌Mike Weinholtz (Democratic) 28.7%; ▌Brian Kamerath (Libertarian) 3.1%; ▌Superdell Schnaze (Independent American) 1.4%
Vermont	Peter Shumlin	Democratic	2010	Incumbent retired. New governor elected. Republican gain	▌ ✓ Phil Scott (Republican) 52.9%; ▌Sue Minter (Democratic) 44.2%; ▌Bill Lee (Independent) 2.8%
Washington	Jay Inslee	Democratic	2012	Incumbent re-elected.	▌ ✓ Jay Inslee (Democratic) 54.2%; ▌Bill Bryant (Republican) 45.5%
West Virginia	Earl Ray Tomblin	Democratic	2010 (Note: Tomblin took office after his predecessor (Joe Manchin) resigned. He was subsequently elected in the 2011 West Virginia gubernatorial special election.)	Incumbent term-limited. New governor elected. Democratic hold	▌ ✓ Jim Justice (Democratic) 49.1%; ▌Bill Cole (Republican) 42.3%; ▌Charlotte Pritt (Mountain) 5.9%; ▌David Moran (Libertarian) 2.2%; ▌Phil Hudok (Constitution) 0.6%

=== Territories ===
Territory	Incumbent	Party	First elected	Result	Candidates
American Samoa	Lolo Matalasi Moliga	Democratic	2012	Incumbent re-elected.	▌ ✓ Lolo Matalasi Moliga (Nonpartisan) 60.2%; ▌Faoa Aitofele Sunia (Nonpartisan) 35.8%; ▌Tuika Tuika (Nonpartisan) 4.0%
Puerto Rico	Alejandro García Padilla	Popular Democratic	2012	Incumbent retired. New governor elected. New Progressive gain.	▌ ✓ Ricardo Rosselló (PNP) 41.8%; ▌David Bernier (PPD) 38.9%; ▌Alexandra Lúgaro (Ind) 11.1%; ▌Manuel Cidre (Ind) 5.7%; ▌María de Lourdes Santiago (PIP) 2.1%

== Statistics ==
=== Closest races ===
States where the margin of victory was under 1%:

1. North Carolina, 0.22%

States where the margin of victory was between 1% and 5%:

1. New Hampshire, 2.27%
2. Puerto Rico, 2.93%
3. Montana, 3.90%

States where the margin of victory was between 5% and 10%:

1. Missouri, 5.57%
2. Indiana, 5.96%
3. West Virginia, 6.79%
4. Oregon, 7.17%
5. Vermont, 8.73%
6. Washington, 8.76%

Red denotes states won by Republicans. Blue denotes states won by Democrats. Dark Blue denotes race won by New Progressives

== Delaware ==
2016 Delaware gubernatorial election
- November 8, 2016
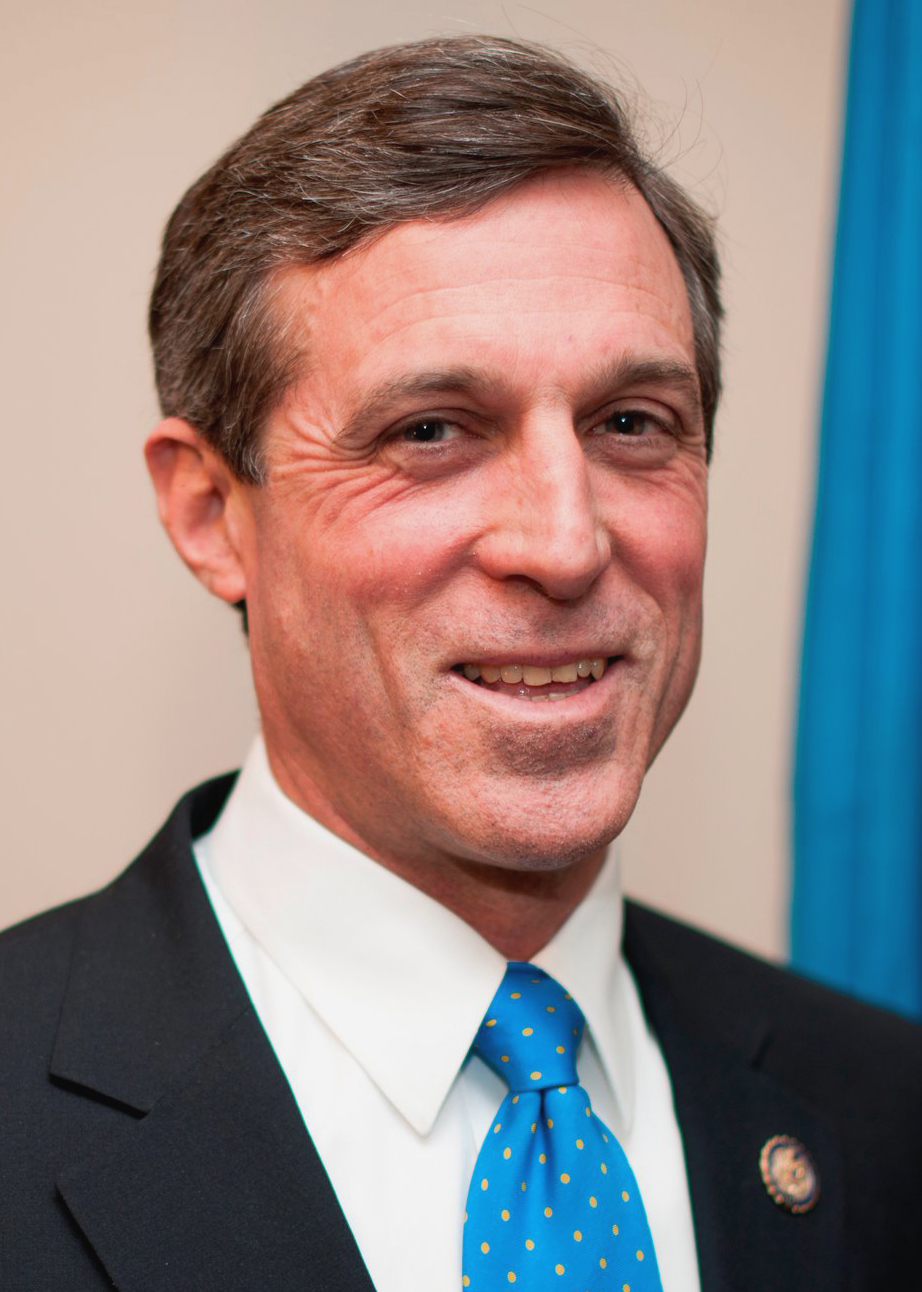

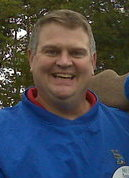
Nominee	John Carney	Colin Bonini
Party	Democratic	Republican
Popular vote	248,404	166,852
Percentage	58.3%	39.2%
- County results Carney: 40–50% 60–70% Bonini: 50–60%
Governor before election
Jack Markell
Democratic
Elected Governor
John Carney
Democratic

Two-term incumbent Governor Jack Markell was term-limited in 2016. Former Democratic Delaware Attorney General Beau Biden, the son of Vice President Joe Biden, announced his intention to run and was seen as the front-runner in the Democratic primary and general election, but he died of brain cancer at the age of 46 on May 30, 2015. Representative John Carney, a former Lieutenant Governor of Delaware who also ran for governor in 2008, won the Democratic nomination. State senator Colin Bonini won the Republican nomination.

Carney won the election, taking 58.3% of the vote compared to Bonini's 39.2%.

Delaware Republican primary
Party	Candidate	Votes	%
Republican	Colin Bonini	21,150	69.88
Republican	Lacey Lafferty	9,115	30.12
Total votes		30,265	100.00

Delaware general election
Party	Candidate	Votes	%
Democratic	John Carney	248,404	58.34
Republican	Colin Bonini	166,852	39.18
Green	Andrew Groff	5,951	1.39
Libertarian	Sean Louis Goward	4,577	1.09
Total votes		425,784	100.00
Democratic hold			

== Indiana ==
2016 Indiana gubernatorial election
- November 8, 2016
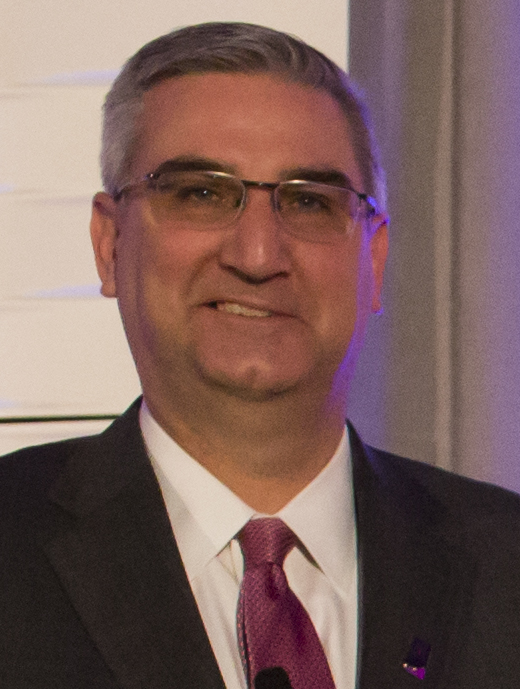

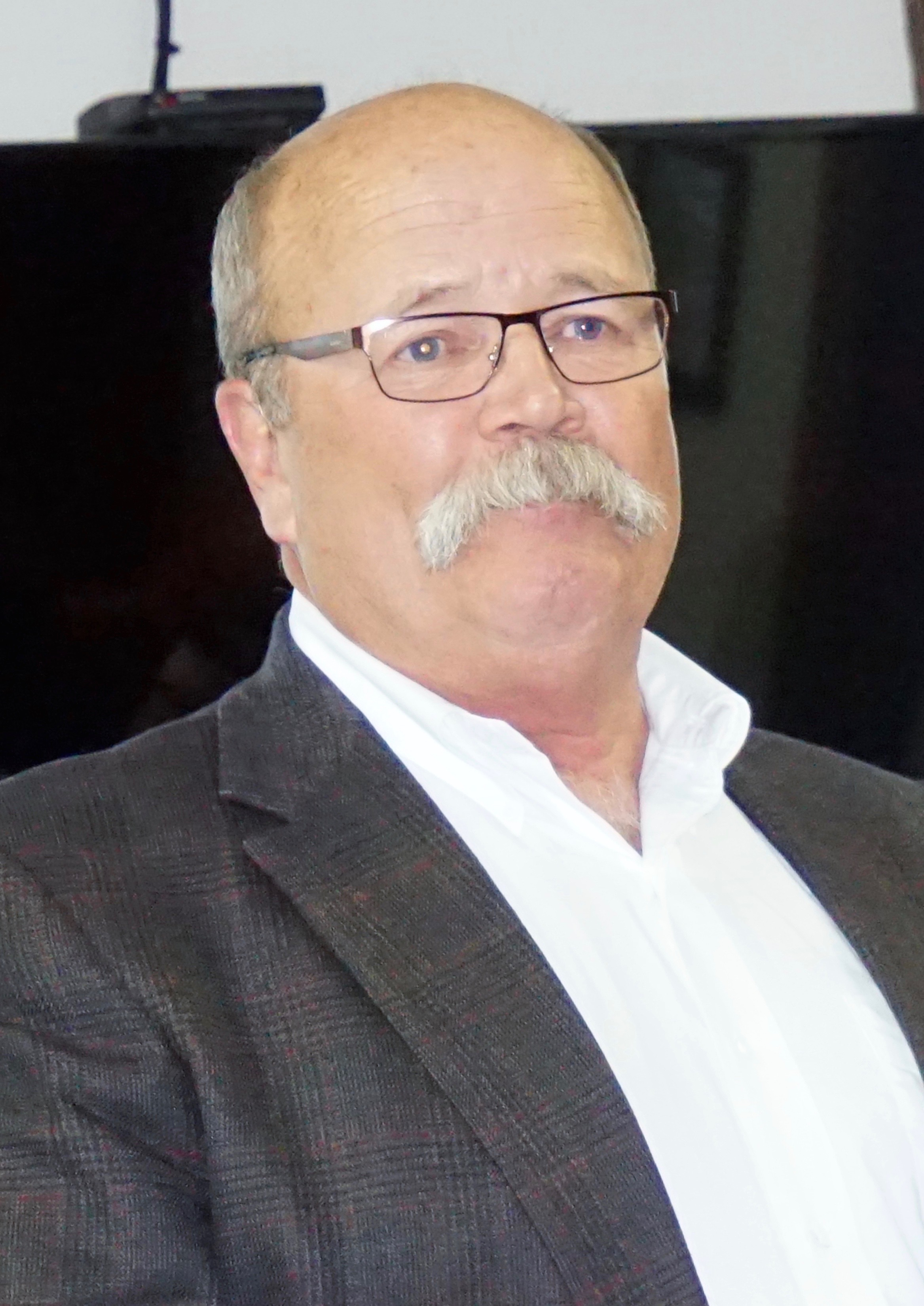
Nominee	Eric Holcomb	John R. Gregg
Party	Republican	Democratic
Running mate	Suzanne Crouch	Christina Hale
Popular vote	1,397,396	1,235,503
Percentage	51.4%	45.4%
- County results Holcomb: 40–50% 50–60% 60–70% 70–80% Gregg: 40-50% 50–60% 60–70%
Governor before election
Mike Pence
Republican
Elected Governor
Eric Holcomb
Republican

One-term incumbent Governor Mike Pence announced his bid for re-election. Pence won in 2012 with 49.6% of the vote. Pence previously served as a U.S. Representative from 2001 to 2013 and was Chairman of the House Republican Conference from 2009 to 2011. Pence had expressed interest in running for President of the United States in the 2016 presidential election, but declined. However, Pence withdrew his bid for a second term on July 15, 2016, to run for vice president as running mate to Donald Trump. Pence was replaced as the gubernatorial nominee by Lieutenant Governor Eric Holcomb.

The 2012 Democratic nominee, former State House Speaker John R. Gregg, won the Democratic nomination. State Representative Karen Tallian and Indiana Superintendent of Public Instruction Glenda Ritz both withdrew their candidacies. State Representative Terri Austin, South Bend Mayor Peter Buttigieg, former Lieutenant Governor Kathy Davis, Kokomo Mayor Greg Goodnight, Lafayette Mayor Tony Roswarski, and House Minority Leader Scott Pelath declined to run for governor. Potential Democratic candidates include former United States Attorney for the Southern District of Indiana and former Secretary of State of Indiana Joe Hogsett, President and CEO of the Biocrossroads Initiative and nominee for the U.S. Senate in 2000 David Johnson, Hammond Mayor Thomas McDermott, Jr., physician, former Commissioner for the Indiana State Department of Health and candidate for Indiana's 7th congressional district in 2008, Woody Myers, former State Senate Minority Leader and nominee for lieutenant governor in 2012 Vi Simpson, U.S. Representative Pete Visclosky and former Evansville Mayor Jonathan Weinzapfel. Former Governor and Senator Evan Bayh had considered running, but has since announced he is running for the U.S. Senate in 2016.

Holcomb won election with 51.4% of the vote, while Gregg took 45.4%.

Indiana Republican primary
Party	Candidate	Votes	%
Republican	Mike Pence (incumbent)	815,699	100.00
Total votes		815,699	100.00

Indiana Democratic primary
Party	Candidate	Votes	%
Democratic	John R. Gregg	547,375	100.00
Total votes		547,375	100.00

Indiana general election
Party	Candidate	Votes	%
Republican	Eric Holcomb	1,397,396	51.38
Democratic	John R. Gregg	1,235,503	45.42
Libertarian	Rex Bell	87,025	3.20
Write-in		44	0.00
Total votes		2,719,968	100.00
Republican hold			

== Missouri ==
2016 Missouri gubernatorial election
- November 8, 2016
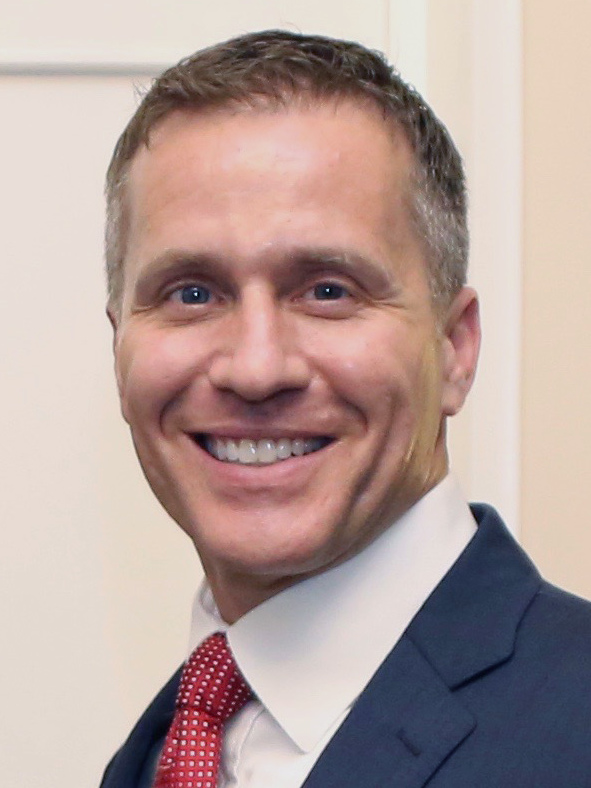

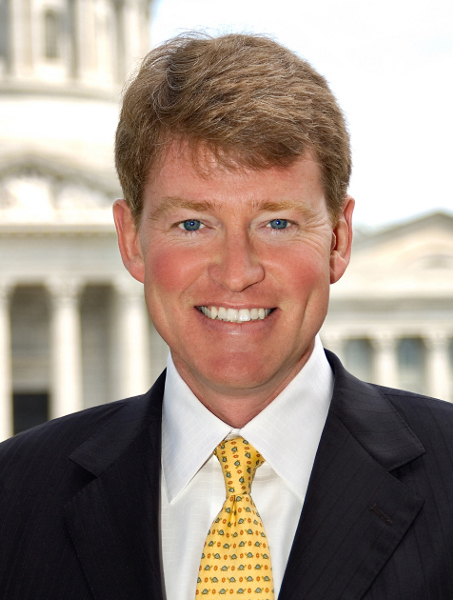
Nominee	Eric Greitens	Chris Koster
Party	Republican	Democratic
Popular vote	1,433,397	1,277,360
Percentage	51.1%	45.6%
- County Results; Greitens: 40–50% 50–60% 60–70% 70–80% Koster: 50–60% 70–80% 80–90%
Governor before election
Jay Nixon
Democratic
Elected Governor
Eric Greitens
Republican

Two-term incumbent Governor Jay Nixon was term-limited in 2016. U.S. Senator and 2004 gubernatorial nominee Claire McCaskill and State Treasurer Clint Zweifel declined to run for governor. On August 3, 2016, Missouri Attorney General Chris Koster won the nomination with a dominating 79% of the primary vote.

Former Speaker of the Missouri House of Representatives Catherine Hanaway, businessman John Brunner, State Senator Bob Dixon, former Navy SEAL Eric Greitens, and Lieutenant Governor Peter Kinder ran for the Republican nomination. State Representative Bart Korman and U.S. Representative Blaine Luetkemeyer declined to run for governor. Missouri State Auditor Tom Schweich had been a candidate for governor before he committed suicide in February 2015. On August 3, 2016, Greitens won the nomination with 35% of the vote.

Greitens won the election, taking 51.3% of the vote compared to Koster's 45.4%.

Missouri Democratic primary
Party	Candidate	Votes	%
Democratic	Chris Koster	256,272	78.75
Democratic	Eric Morrison	31,474	9.67
Democratic	Charles Wheeler	25,756	7.92
Democratic	Leonard Steinman	11,911	3.66
Total votes		325,413	100.00

Missouri Republican primary
Party	Candidate	Votes	%
Republican	Eric Greitens	236,481	34.56
Republican	John Brunner	169,620	24.79
Republican	Peter Kinder	141,629	20.70
Republican	Catherine Hanaway	136,521	19.95
Total votes		684,251	100.00

Missouri general election
Party	Candidate	Votes	%
Republican	Eric Greitens	1,433,397	51.14
Democratic	Chris Koster	1,277,360	45.57
Libertarian	Cisse Spragins	41,154	1.47
Independent	Lester Benton Turilli Jr.	30,019	1.07
Green	Don Fitz	21,088	0.75
Write-in		28	0.00
Total votes		2,803,046	100.00
Republican gain from Democratic			

== Montana ==
2016 Montana gubernatorial election
- November 8, 2016
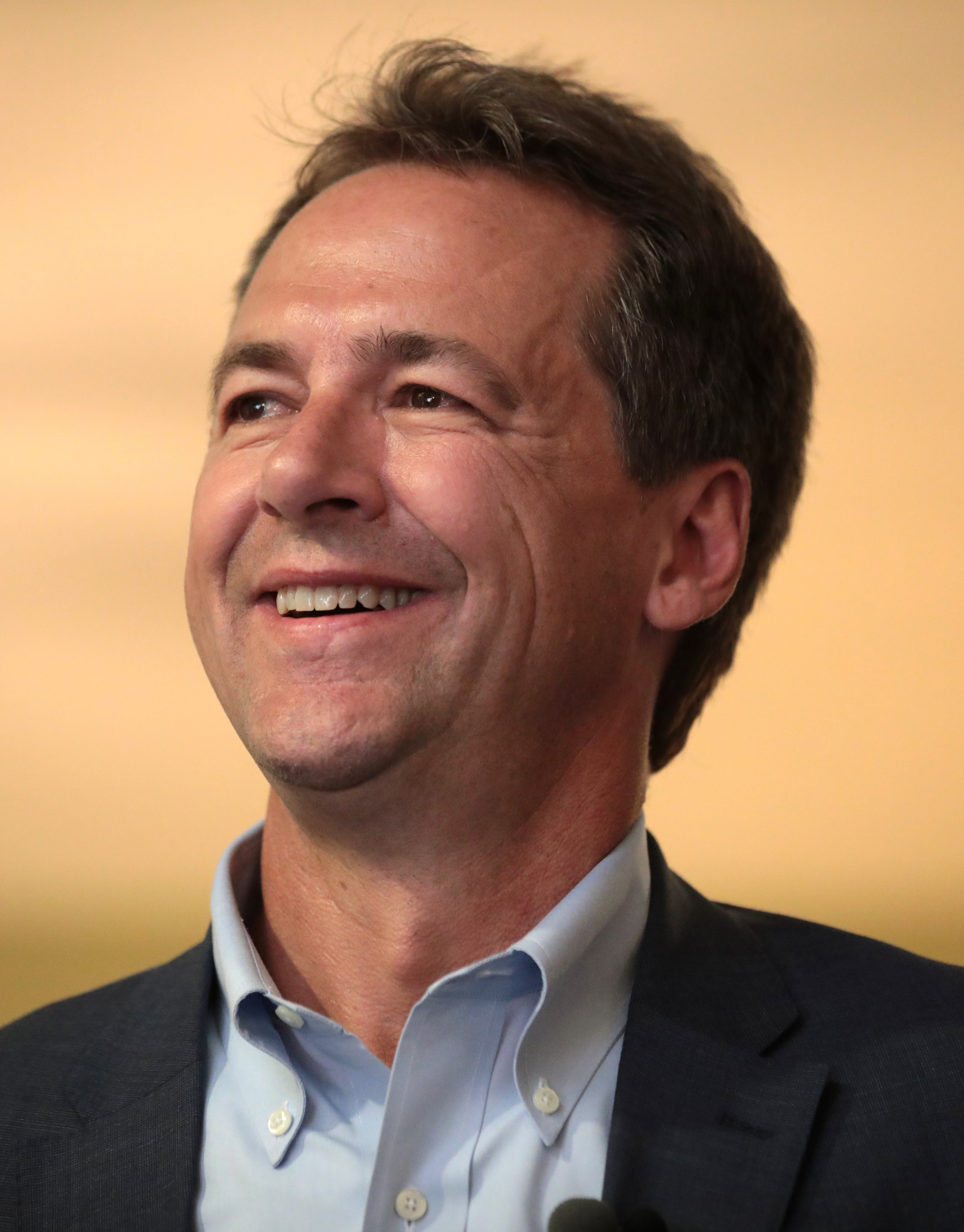

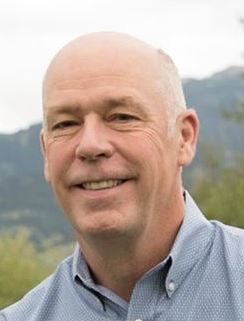
Nominee	Steve Bullock	Greg Gianforte
Party	Democratic	Republican
Running mate	Mike Cooney	Lesley Robinson
Popular vote	255,933	236,115
Percentage	50.3%	46.4%
- County results Bullock: 40–50% 50–60% 60–70% 70–80% Gianforte: 40–50% 50–60% 60–70% 70–80% 80–90%
Governor before election
Steve Bullock
Democratic
Elected Governor
Steve Bullock
Democratic

One-term incumbent Governor Steve Bullock ran for re-election. Bullock was elected in 2012 with 48.9% of the vote. He previously served as Attorney General of Montana from 2009 to 2013.

Former Secretary of State Brad Johnson and businessman Mark Perea ran for the Republican nomination, but were defeated by businessman Greg Gianforte. Montana Attorney General Tim Fox had been speculated as a potential candidate, but instead chose to run for re-election.

Bullock won re-election, taking 50.2% of the vote. Gianforte won 46.4% of the vote.

Montana Democratic primary
Party	Candidate	Votes	%
Democratic	Steve Bullock (incumbent)	109,450	91.26
Democratic	Bill McChesney	10,486	8.74
Total votes		119,936	100.00

Montana Republican primary
Party	Candidate	Votes	%
Republican	Greg Gianforte	109,882	76.38
Republican	Terry Nelson	33,987	23.62
Total votes		143,869	100.00

Montana general election
Party	Candidate	Votes	%
Democratic	Steve Bullock (incumbent)	255,933	50.25
Republican	Greg Gianforte	236,115	46.35
Libertarian	Ted Dunlap	17,312	3.40
Total votes		509,360	100.00
Democratic hold			

== New Hampshire ==
2016 New Hampshire gubernatorial election
- November 8, 2016
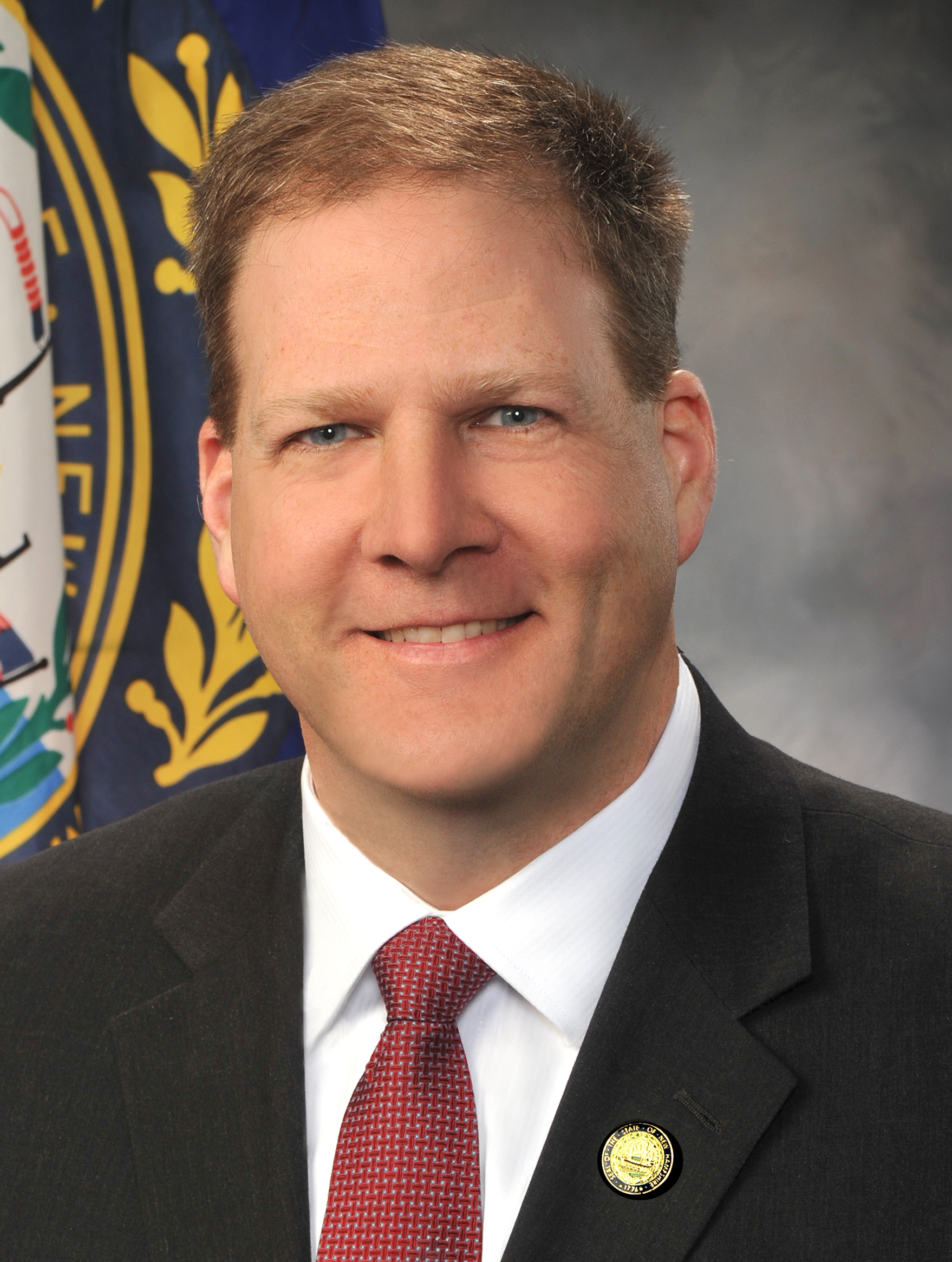

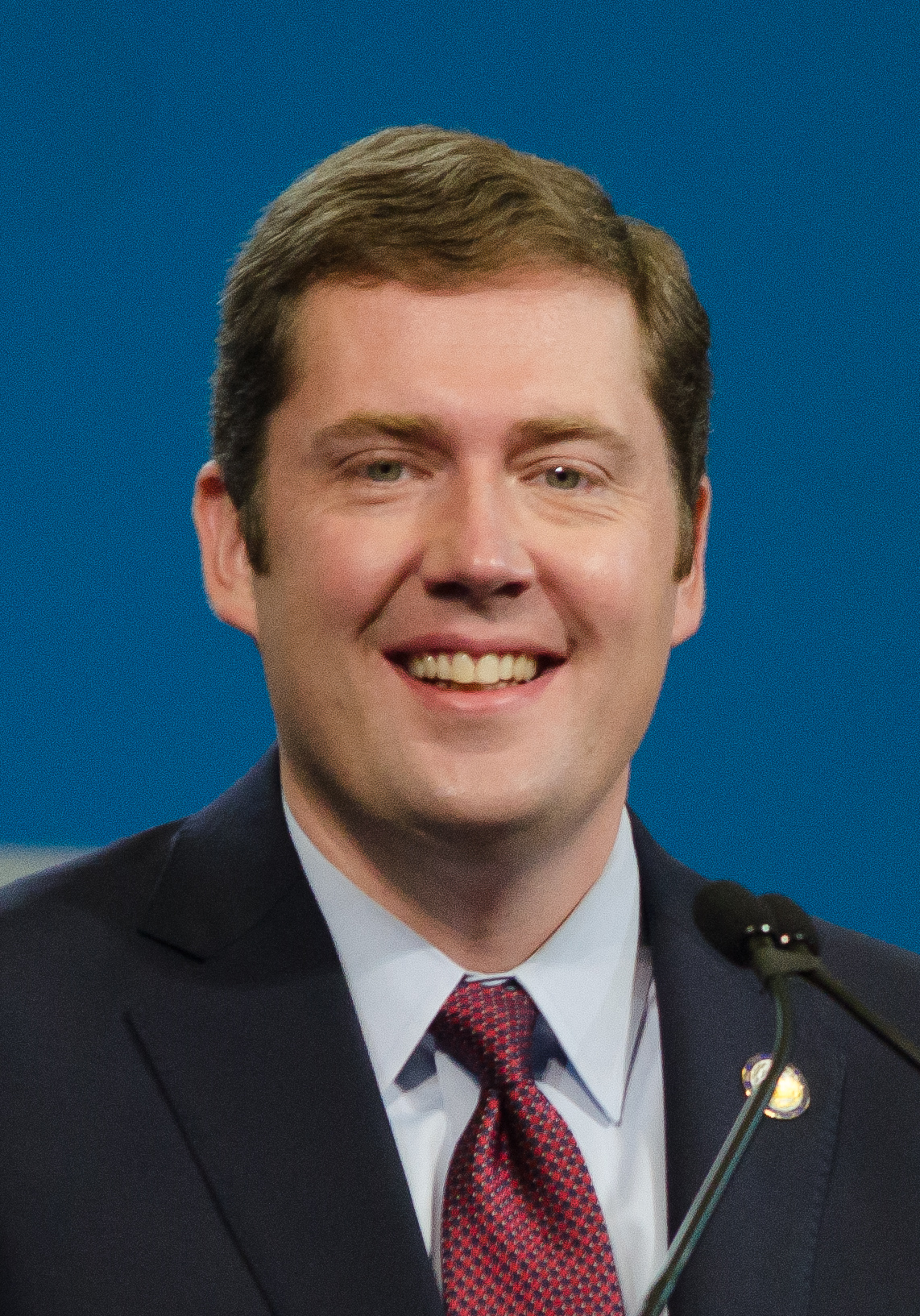
Nominee	Chris Sununu	Colin Van Ostern
Party	Republican	Democratic
Popular vote	354,040	337,589
Percentage	48.8%	46.6%
- County results Sununu: 40–50% 50–60% Van Ostern: 50–60%
Governor before election
Maggie Hassan
Democratic
Elected Governor
Chris Sununu
Republican

Two-term Democratic incumbent Governor Maggie Hassan ran for the U.S. Senate, narrowly defeating incumbent Republican Kelly Ayotte, instead of running for a third term as governor. She won a second term in 2014 with 53% of the vote against Republican businessman Walt Havenstein. Executive Councilor Colin Van Ostern defeated Deputy Secretary of State and Director of Securities Regulation Mark Connolly for the Democratic nomination.

Executive Councilor Chris Sununu, state representative and entrepreneur Frank Edelblut, and Jon Lavoie ran for the Republican nomination. Sununu defeated his challengers for the Republican nomination.

Despite most pre-election polling suggesting a Democratic win, Sununu narrowly won election with 49% of the vote. Van Ostern won 46.7% and Libertarian Max Abramson won 4.3% of the vote.

New Hampshire Democratic primary
Party	Candidate	Votes	%
Democratic	Colin Van Ostern	37,696	51.99
Democratic	Steve Marchand	18,338	25.29
Democratic	Mark Connolly	14,840	20.47
Democratic	Ian Freeman	1,069	1.47
Democratic	Derek Dextraze	557	0.77
Total votes		72,500	100.00

New Hampshire Republican primary
Party	Candidate	Votes	%
Republican	Chris Sununu	34,137	30.68
Republican	Frank Edelblut	33,149	29.79
Republican	Ted Gatsas	22,840	20.53
Republican	Jeanie Forrester	19,716	17.72
Republican	John Lavoie	1,429	1.28
Total votes		111,271	100.00

New Hampshire general election
Party	Candidate	Votes	%
Republican	Chris Sununu	354,040	48.84
Democratic	Colin Van Ostern	337,589	46.57
Libertarian	Max Abramson	31,243	4.31
Write-in		1,991	0.28
Total votes		724,863	100.00
Republican gain from Democratic			

== North Carolina ==
2016 North Carolina gubernatorial election
- November 8, 2016
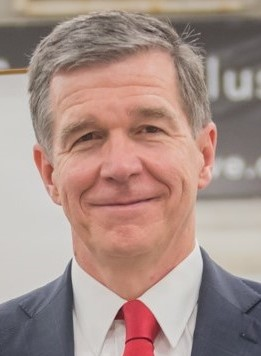

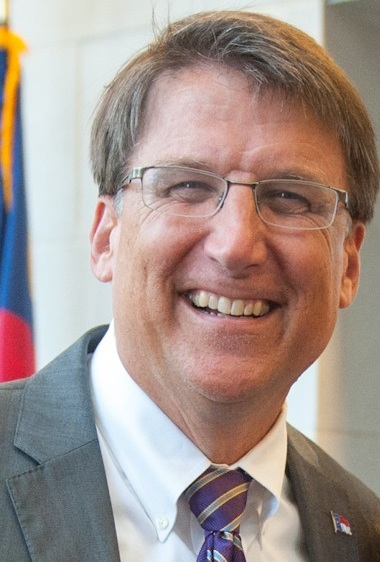
Nominee	Roy Cooper	Pat McCrory
Party	Democratic	Republican
Popular vote	2,309,157	2,298,880
Percentage	49.0%	48.8%
- County results Cooper: 40–50% 50–60% 60–70% 70–80% McCrory: 50–60% 60–70% 70–80%
Governor before election
Pat McCrory
Republican
Elected Governor
Roy Cooper
Democratic

One-term incumbent Governor Pat McCrory ran for re-election. McCrory was elected in 2012 with 54.7% of the vote. McCrory previously served as Mayor of Charlotte from 1995 to 2009.

North Carolina Attorney General Roy Cooper defeated former State Representative Kenneth Spaulding to win the Democratic nomination for governor. James Protzman, a former Chapel Hill town council member, had declared his candidacy, but later withdrew from the race. United States Secretary of Transportation Anthony Foxx declined to run for governor.

After a dispute in results, Cooper won the election. Cooper won 49% of the vote, while McCrory won 48.9%.

North Carolina Republican primary
Party	Candidate	Votes	%
Republican	Pat McCrory (incumbent)	869,114	81.76
Republican	Robert Brawley	112,624	10.59
Republican	Charles Moss	81,315	7.65
Total votes		1,063,053	100.00

North Carolina Democratic primary
Party	Candidate	Votes	%
Democratic	Roy Cooper	710,658	68.70
Democratic	Kenneth Spaulding	323,774	31.30
Total votes		1,034,432	100.00

North Carolina general election
Party	Candidate	Votes	%
Democratic	Roy Cooper	2,309,162	49.02
Republican	Pat McCrory (incumbent)	2,298,881	48.80
Libertarian	Lon Cecil	102,978	2.19
Total votes		4,711,021	100.00
Democratic gain from Republican			

== North Dakota ==
2016 North Dakota gubernatorial election
- November 8, 2016
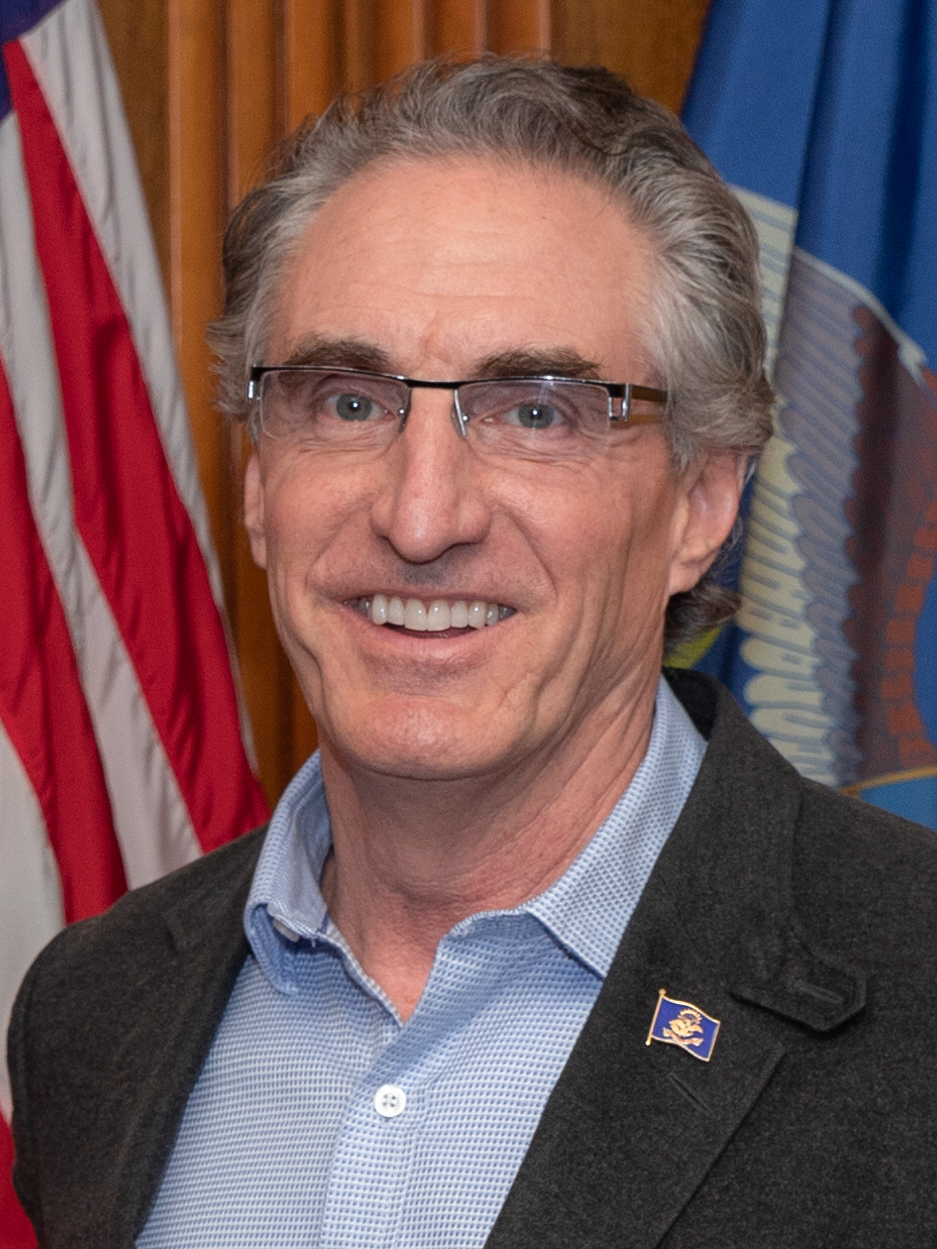

Nominee	Doug Burgum	Marvin Nelson
Party	Republican	Democratic–NPL
Running mate	Brent Sanford	Joan Heckaman
Popular vote	259,863	65,855
Percentage	76.5%	19.4%
- County results Burgum: 50–60% 60–70% 70–80% 80–90% Nelson: 50–60% 60–70%
Governor before election
Jack Dalrymple
Republican
Elected Governor
Doug Burgum
Republican

One-term incumbent Governor Jack Dalrymple declined to seek re-election. Dalrymple was elected to his first full term with 63.1% of the vote in 2012, after first taking the seat in 2010 after John Hoeven resigned to become a U.S. Senator. Dalrymple was previously Lieutenant Governor of North Dakota from 2000 to 2010.

Republican candidates included Attorney General Wayne Stenehjem, businessman Doug Burgum, and State Representative and plastic surgeon Rick Becker. Burgum won the nomination.

Potential Democratic candidates included former Congressman Earl Pomeroy, state Senator George B. Sinner and state Senate Minority Leader Mac Schneider. Former Agriculture Commissioner Sarah Vogel formed an exploratory a campaign but announced on Jan. 28, 2016 that she will not run for governor. Senator Heidi Heitkamp declined to run for governor. State representative Marvin Nelson won his party's nomination.

Burgum won the election, taking 76.7% of the vote, while Nelson won 19.4%.

North Dakota Republican primary
Party	Candidate	Votes	%
Republican	Doug Burgum	68,042	59.47
Republican	Wayne Stenehjem	44,158	38.59
Republican	Paul Sorum	2,164	1.89
Write-in		51	0.04
Total votes		114,415	100.00

North Dakota Democratic-NPL primary
Party	Candidate	Votes	%
Democratic–NPL	Marvin Nelson	17,278	99.66
Write-in		59	0.34
Total votes		17,337	100.00

North Dakota general election
Party	Candidate	Votes	%
Republican	Doug Burgum	259,863	76.52
Democratic–NPL	Marvin Nelson	65,855	19.39
Libertarian	Marty Riske	13,230	3.90
Write-in		653	0.19
Total votes		339,601	100.00
Republican hold			

== Oregon (special) ==
2016 Oregon gubernatorial special election
- November 8, 2016
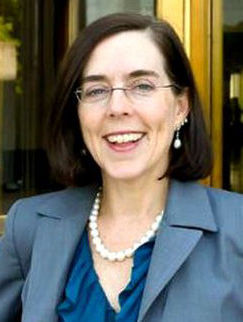

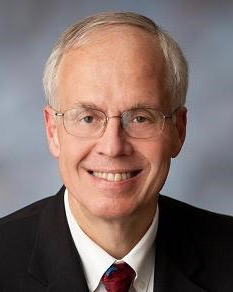
Nominee	Kate Brown	Bud Pierce
Party	Democratic	Republican
Alliance	Working Families
Popular vote	985,027	845,609
Percentage	50.6%	43.5%
- County Results; Brown: 50–60% 60–70% 70–80% Pierce: 40–50% 50–60% 60–70% 70–80%
Governor before election
Kate Brown
Democratic
Elected Governor
Kate Brown
Democratic

Governor John Kitzhaber, who won reelection in 2014 with 49.9% of the vote, announced his pending resignation on February 13, 2015, amid controversy surrounding his fiancée's consulting contracts and work within his administration. Kate Brown, Oregon's Secretary of State, was sworn in as governor on February 18, 2015, upon Kitzhaber's resignation. In accordance with the Constitution of Oregon, a special election was held in 2016 for the remainder of the term to which Kitzhaber was elected in 2014. Brown ran against Republican Bud Pierce, an Oncologist from Salem.

Brown won the election, taking 50.5% of the vote compared to Pierce's 43.8%. In winning, Kate Brown became the first openly LGBTQ Governor elected in the United States.

Oregon Democratic primary
Party	Candidate	Votes	%
Democratic	Kate Brown (incumbent)	494,890	83.03
Democratic	Julian Bell	49,313	8.27
Democratic	Dave Stauffer	16,108	2.70
Democratic	Steve Johnson	13,363	2.24
Democratic	Kevin M. Forsythe	10,147	1.70
Democratic	Chet Chance	5,636	0.95
Write-in		6,595	1.11
Total votes		596,052	100.00

Oregon Republican primary
Party	Candidate	Votes	%
Republican	Bud Pierce	171,158	47.66
Republican	Allen Alley	103,388	28.79
Republican	Bruce Cuff	41,598	11.58
Republican	Bob Niemeyer	35,669	9.93
Republican	Bob Forthan	4,290	1.19
Write-in		3,020	0.84
Total votes		359,123	100.00

Oregon general election
Party	Candidate	Votes	%
Democratic	Kate Brown (incumbent)	985,027	50.62
Republican	Bud Pierce	845,609	43.45
Independent Party (Oregon)	Cliff Thomason	47,481	2.44
Libertarian	James Foster	45,191	2.32
Constitution	Aaron Donald Auer	19,400	1.00
Write-in		3,338	0.17
Total votes		1,946,046	100.00
Democratic hold			

== Utah ==
2016 Utah gubernatorial election
- November 8, 2016
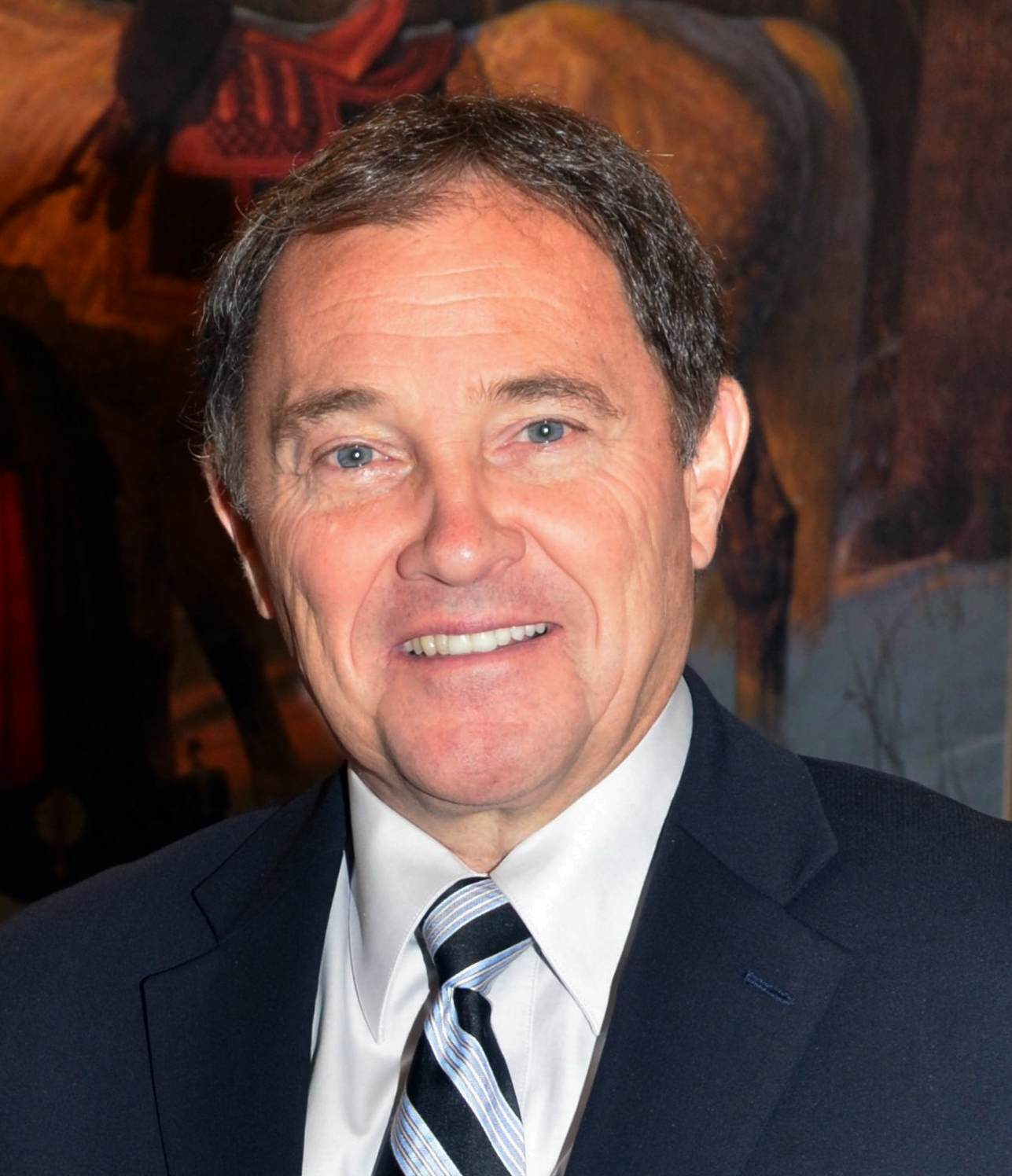

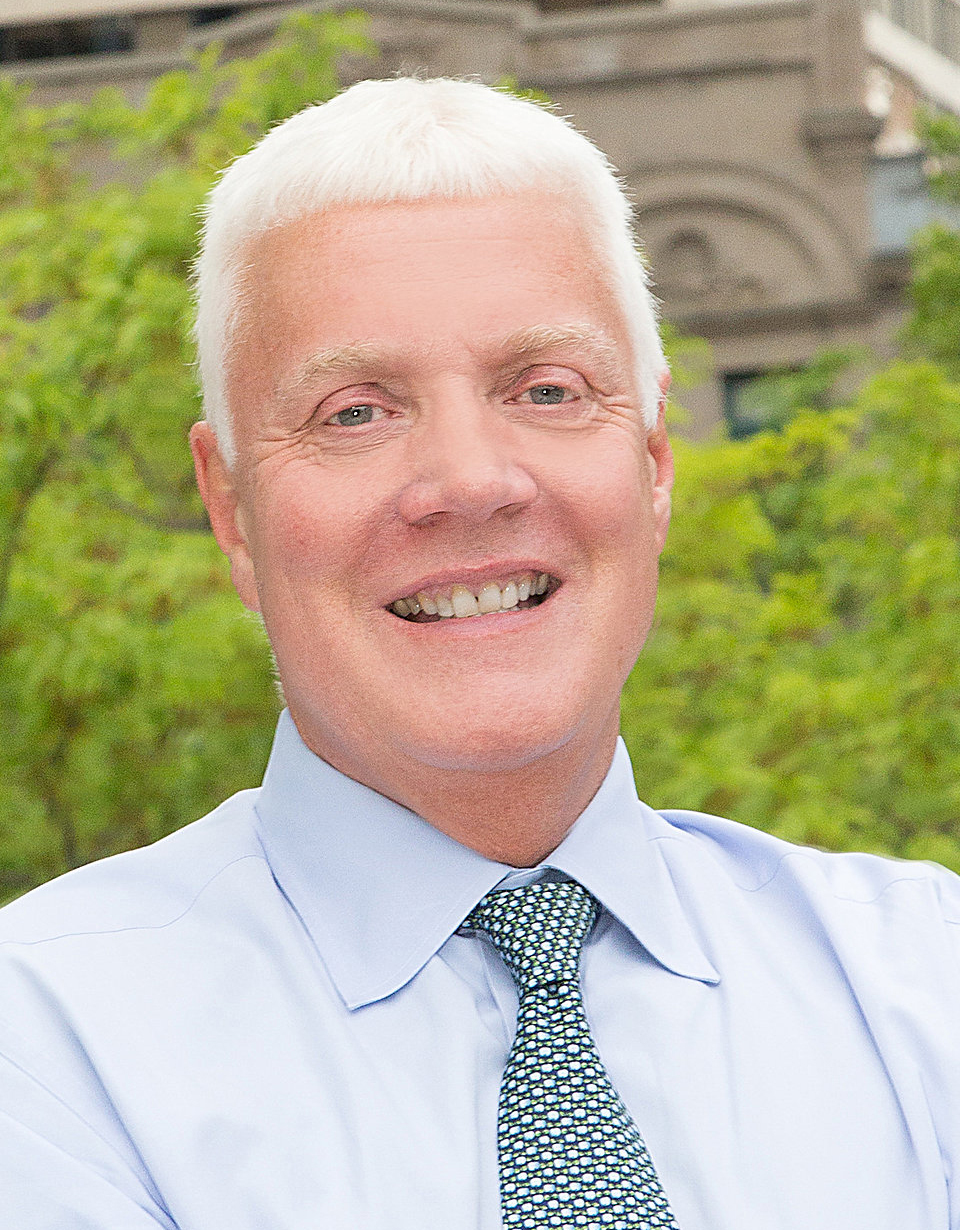
Nominee	Gary Herbert	Mike Weinholtz
Party	Republican	Democratic
Running mate	Spencer Cox	Kim Bowman
Popular vote	750,850	323,349
Percentage	66.7%	28.7%
- County Results; Herbert: 40–50% 50–60% 60–70% 70–80% 80–90% Weinholtz: 40–50%
Governor before election
Gary Herbert
Republican
Elected Governor
Gary Herbert
Republican

Incumbent Governor Gary Herbert ran for re-election. He was the Lieutenant Governor of Utah from 2005 to 2009 and became governor after Jon Huntsman, Jr. resigned to become United States Ambassador to China. He won the seat in a 2010 special election and was elected to his first full term with 68.4% of the vote in 2012. Herbert defeated businessman Jonathan Johnson to win the nomination.

Businessman Michael Weinholtz won the Democratic nomination. Former Congressman Jim Matheson declined to run.

Herbert won re-election, taking 66.6% of the vote compared to Weinholtz's 28.9%.

Utah Republican primary
Party	Candidate	Votes	%
Republican	Gary Herbert (incumbent)	176,866	71.75
Republican	Jonathan E. Johnson	69,663	28.25
Total votes		246,529	100.00

Utah general election
Party	Candidate	Votes	%
Republican	Gary Herbert (incumbent)	750,850	66.74
Democratic	Mike Weinholtz	323,349	28.74
Libertarian	Brian Kamerath	34,827	3.10
Independent American	Superdell Schanze	15,912	1.41
Write-in		97	0.01
Total votes		1,125,035	100.00
Republican hold			

== Vermont ==
2016 Vermont gubernatorial election
- November 8, 2016
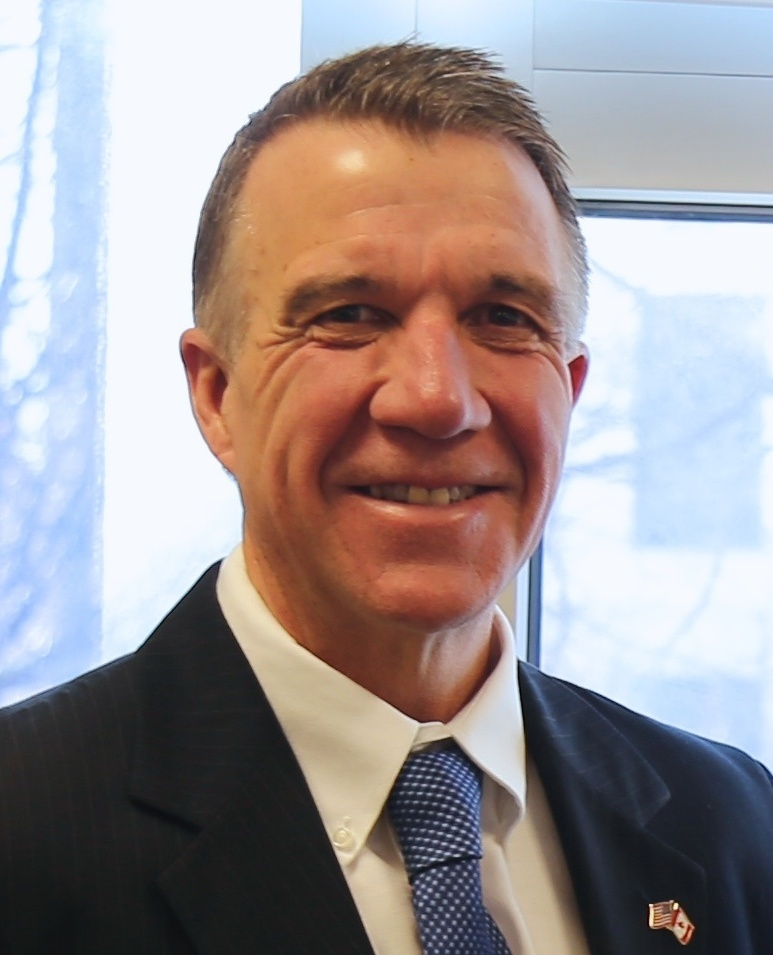

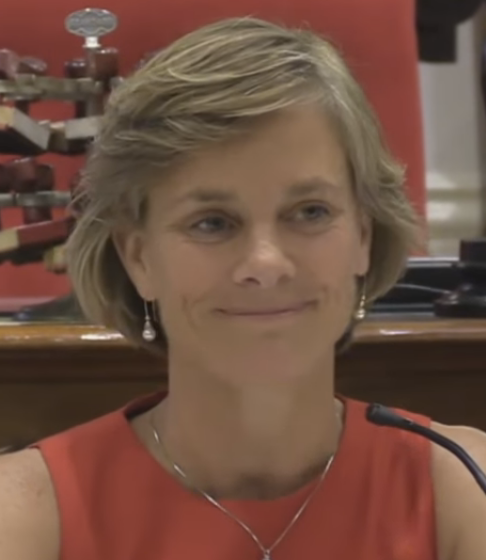
Nominee	Phil Scott	Sue Minter
Party	Republican	Democratic
Popular vote	166,817	139,253
Percentage	52.9%	44.2%
- County results Scott: 40–50% 50–60% 60–70% 70–80% Minter: 40–50% 50–60%
Governor before election
Peter Shumlin
Democratic
Elected Governor
Phil Scott
Republican

Three-term incumbent Governor Peter Shumlin declined to seek re-election. He was re-elected with 46.4% of the vote in 2014. As he did not receive a majority of the vote, the Vermont General Assembly was required to choose the winner. The Vermont Assembly chose Shumlin over Republican nominee Scott Milne by 110 votes to 69.

Sue Minter defeated former state senator Matt Dunne for the Democratic nomination for governor. House Speaker Shap Smith withdrew from the race. Former lieutenant governor Doug Racine declined to run for governor.

Lieutenant Governor Phil Scott won the Republican nomination. Former state senator and former Vermont Auditor of Accounts Randy Brock and 2014 Republican nominee Scott Milne declined to run for governor. Former Libertarian gubernatorial candidate Dan Feliciano was a potential candidate.

Scott won the election, taking 52.9% compared to Minter's 44.2%.

Vermont Democratic primary
Party	Candidate	Votes	%
Democratic	Sue Minter	35,979	51.20
Democratic	Matt Dunne	26,699	38.00
Democratic	Peter W. Galbraith	6,616	9.40
Democratic	Cris Ericson	538	0.80
Democratic	H. Brooke Paige	387	0.60
Write-in		579	1.84
Total votes		70,798	100.00

Vermont Republican primary
Party	Candidate	Votes	%
Republican	Phil Scott	27,669	60.50
Republican	Bruce Lisman	18,055	39.50
Write-in		48	0.22
Total votes		45,772	100.00

Vermont general election
Party	Candidate	Votes	%
Republican	Phil Scott	166,817	52.90
Democratic	Sue Minter	139,253	44.17
Liberty Union	Bill Lee	8,912	2.83
Write-in		313	0.10
Total votes		315,295	100.00
Republican gain from Democratic			

== Washington ==
2016 Washington gubernatorial election
- November 8, 2016
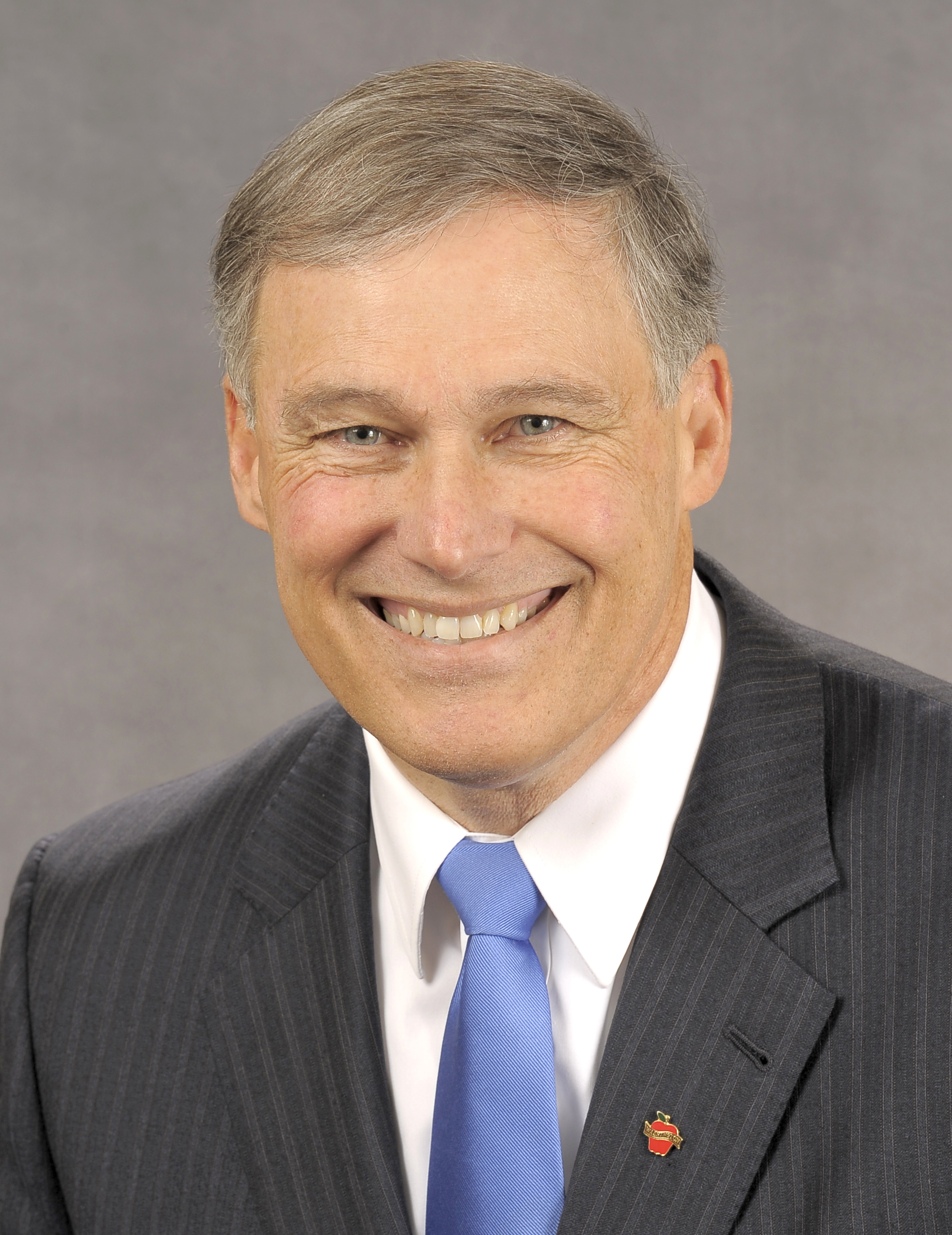

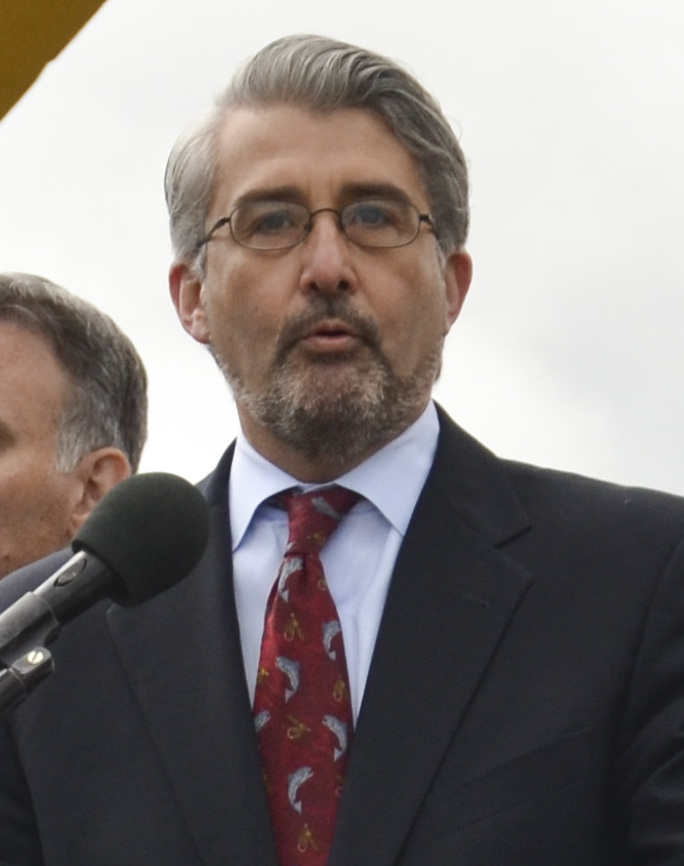
Nominee	Jay Inslee	Bill Bryant
Party	Democratic	Republican
Popular vote	1,760,520	1,476,346
Percentage	54.2%	45.5%
- County results Inslee: 40–50% 50–60% 60–70% Bryant: 50–60% 60–70% 70–80%
Governor before election
Jay Inslee
Democratic
Elected Governor
Jay Inslee
Democratic

One-term incumbent Governor Jay Inslee ran for re-election. Inslee was elected in 2012 with 51.4% of the vote against Republican Attorney General Rob McKenna. Inslee previously served as a U.S. Representative from 1993 to 1995 and from 1999 to 2012. Seattle Port Commissioner Bill Bryant advanced to the November general election. Potential Republican candidates include U.S. Representatives Jaime Herrera Beutler and Cathy McMorris Rodgers, State Senator Michael Baumgartner, and former State Representative Cathy Dahlquist.

Inslee won re-election, taking 54.2% of the vote. Bryant won 45.5%.

Washington blanket primary
Party	Candidate	Votes	%
Democratic	Jay Inslee (incumbent)	687,412	49.30
Republican	Bill Bryant	534,519	38.33
Republican	Bill Hirt	48,382	3.47
Democratic	Patrick O'Rourke	40,572	2.91
Independent	Steve Rubenstein	22,582	1.62
Democratic	James Robert Deal	14,623	1.05
Democratic	Johnathan Dodds	14,152	1.01
Republican	Goodspaceguy	13,191	0.95
Socialist Workers	Mary Martin	10,374	0.74
Independent	David Blomstrom	4,512	0.32
Independent	Christian Joubert	4,103	0.29
Total votes		1,394,422	100.00

2016 Washington gubernatorial election
Party	Candidate	Votes	%	±%
Democratic	Jay Inslee (incumbent)	1,760,520	54.25%	+2.71%
Republican	Bill Bryant	1,476,346	45.49%	−2.97%
Write-in		8,416	0.26%	N/A
Total votes		3,245,282	100.00%	N/A
Democratic hold				

== West Virginia ==
2016 West Virginia gubernatorial election
- November 8, 2016
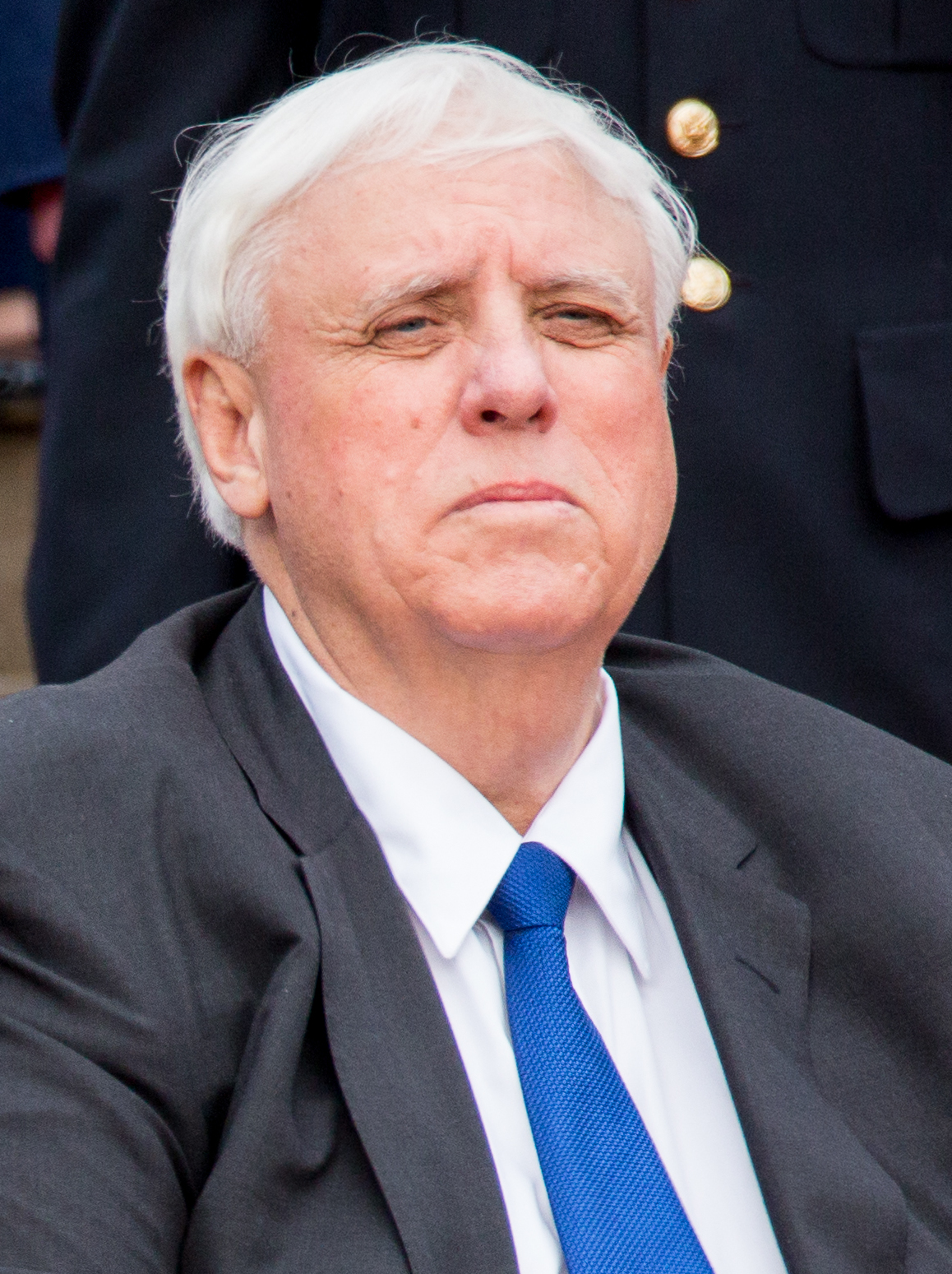

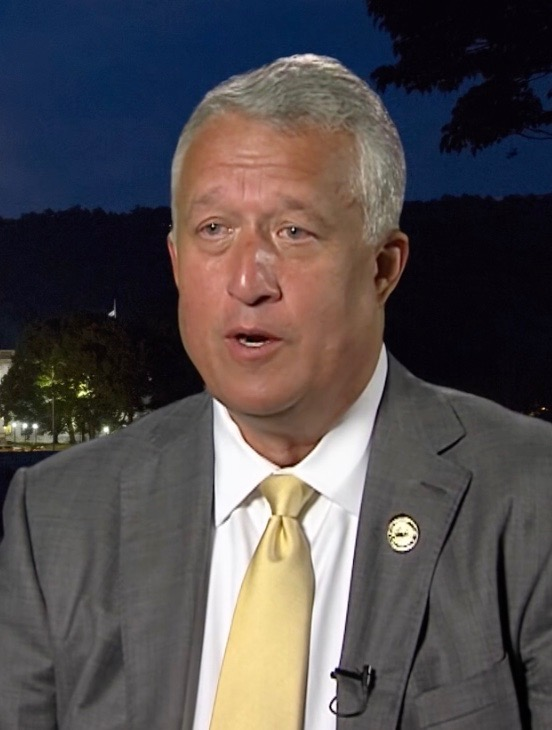
Nominee	Jim Justice	Bill Cole
Party	Democratic	Republican
Popular vote	350,408	301,987
Percentage	49.1%	42.3%
Nominee	Charlotte Pritt
Party	Mountain
Popular vote	42,068
Percentage	5.9%
- County results Justice: 40–50% 50–60% 60–70% Cole: 40–50% 50–60% 60–70%
Governor before election
Earl Ray Tomblin
Democratic
Elected Governor
Jim Justice
Democratic

Governor Earl Ray Tomblin was term-limited in 2016. Tomblin was first elected in a 2011 special election after Joe Manchin resigned after being elected to the United States Senate. Tomblin then won election to a full term in 2012.

Democratic candidates included former U.S. Attorney Booth Goodwin, state Senator Jeff Kessler, and businessman Jim Justice. Former Senator Carte Goodwin, former Speaker of the West Virginia House of Delegates Rick Thompson, West Virginia State Treasurer John Perdue, State Senator Mike Green and State Delegates Doug Reynolds, Doug Skaff and West Virginia Secretary of State Natalie Tennant declined to seek the nomination. On May 10, 2016, Justice won the Democratic primary and became the nominee.

President of the Senate Bill Cole, college student and former candidate for Mayor of Pineville Andrew Utterback, and former Bramwell Police Chief and former Democratic candidate for House of Delegates Edwin Vanover ran for the Republican nomination. U.S. Representatives David McKinley and Evan Jenkins declined to run for governor. West Virginia Attorney General Patrick Morrisey had been considered a potential Republican candidate, but instead chose to run for re-election. Potential Republican candidates included State Delegate Erikka Storch and Olympic gymnast Mary Lou Retton. Cole won the Republican nomination.

Justice won the election, taking 49.1% of the vote. Cole won 42.3%, while Charlotte Pritt of the Mountain Party won 5.9% of the vote. Just months after assuming office, Justice switched to the Republican Party.

West Virginia Democratic primary
Party	Candidate	Votes	%
Democratic	Jim Justice	132,704	51.39
Democratic	Booth Goodwin	65,416	25.32
Democratic	Jeff Kessler	60,230	23.31
Total votes		258,350	100.00

West Virginia Republican primary
Party	Candidate	Votes	%
Republican	Bill Cole	161,127	100.00
Total votes		161,127	100.00

West Virginia general election
Party	Candidate	Votes	%
Democratic	Jim Justice	350,408	49.09
Republican	Bill Cole	301,987	42.30
Mountain	Charlotte Pritt	42,068	5.89
Libertarian	David Moran	15,354	2.15
Constitution	Phil Hudok	4,041	0.57
Total votes		713,858	100.00
Democratic hold			

== Territories ==
=== Puerto Rico ===
2016 Puerto Rico gubernatorial election
- November 8, 2016
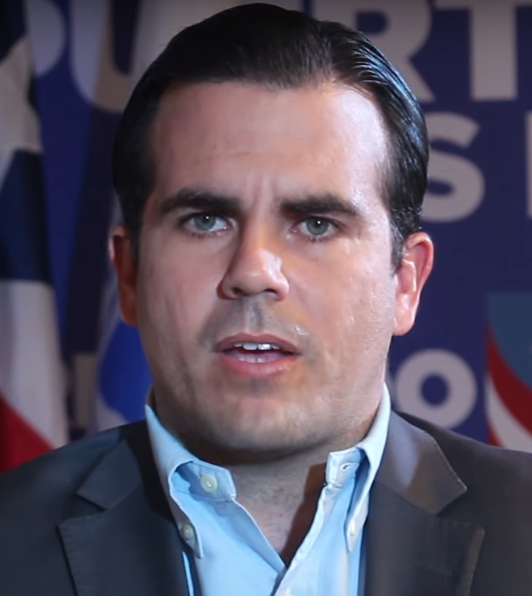

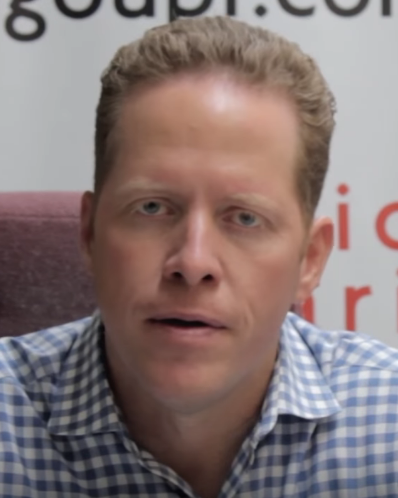

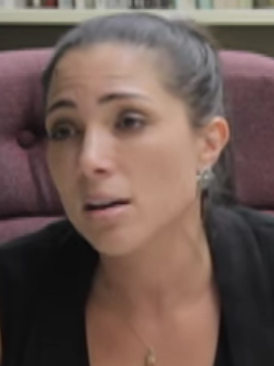

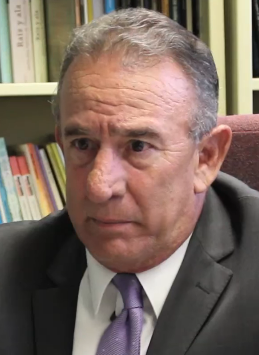
Nominee	Ricardo Rosselló	David Bernier
Party	New Progressive	Popular Democratic
Alliance	Democratic	Democratic
Popular vote	655,626	610,956
Percentage	41.8%	38.9%
Nominee	Alexandra Lúgaro	Manuel Cidre
Party	Independent	Independent
Popular vote	174,529	89,890
Percentage	11.1%	5.7%
- Municipality map
Governor before election
Alejandro García Padilla
Popular Democratic
Elected Governor
Ricardo Rosselló
New Progressive

One-term incumbent Governor Alejandro García Padilla was eligible to run for re-election, but chose to retire. García Padilla is a member of the Popular Democratic Party (PDP).

David Bernier, former Secretary of State of Puerto Rico and former President of the Puerto Rico Olympic Committee, won the PDP nomination for governor.

Resident Commissioner of Puerto Rico Pedro Pierluisi, who is affiliated with the New Progressive Party (PNP). and activist and political commentator Ricky Rosselló sought the PNP nomination for governor, and Rosselló won the nomination.

Rosselló won the election.

Puerto Rico New Progressive primary
Party	Candidate	Votes	%
New Progressive	Ricardo Rosselló	236,524	51.09
New Progressive	Pedro Pierluisi	226,449	48.91
Total votes		462,973	100.00

Puerto Rico general election
Party	Candidate	Votes	%
New Progressive	Ricardo Rosselló	660,510	41.80
Popular Democratic	David Bernier	614,190	38.87
Independent	Alexandra Lúgaro	175,831	11.13
Independent	Manuel Cidre	90,494	5.73
Independence	María de Lourdes Santiago	33,729	2.13
Worker's People Party of Puerto Rico	Rafael Bernabe Riefkohl	5,430	0.34
Total votes		1,589,991	100.00
New Progressive gain from Popular Democratic			
Democratic hold			

=== American Samoa ===
2016 American Samoa gubernatorial election
- November 8, 2016
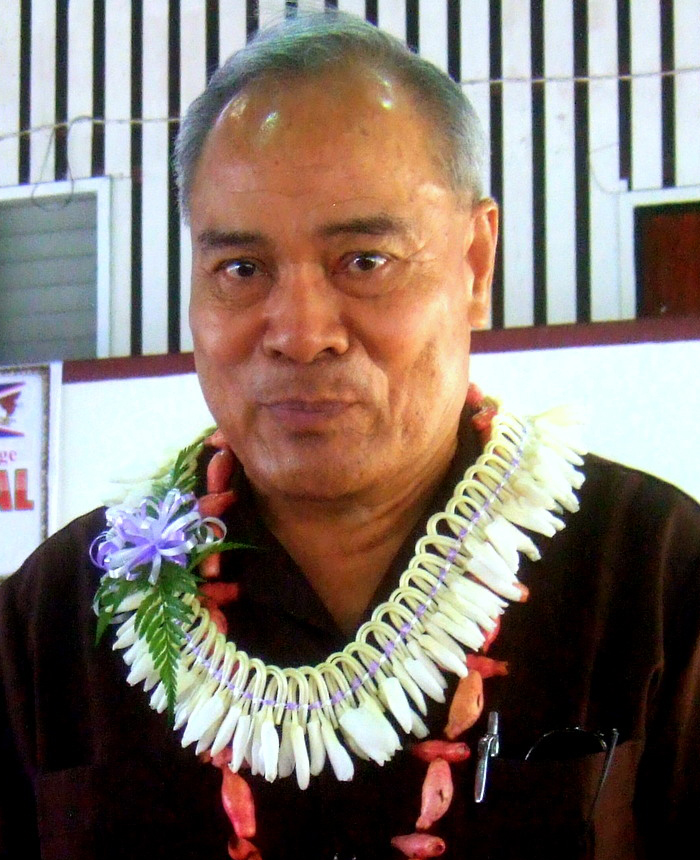

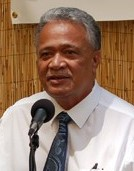
Nominee	Lolo Matalasi Moliga	Faoa Aitofele Sunia
Party	Nonpartisan	Nonpartisan
Running mate	Lemanu Peleti Mauga	Larry Sanitoa
Popular vote	7,235	4,305
Percentage	60.2%	35.8%
- Results by voting district: Lolo Matalasi Moliga : 50–55% 55–60% 60–65% 65–70% 70–75% 75–80% Faoa Aitofele Sunia: 55–60%
Governor before election
Lolo Matalasi Moliga
Democratic
Elected Governor
Lolo Matalasi Moliga
Democratic

One-term incumbent Governor Lolo Letalu Matalasi Moliga ran for re-election. Moliga was elected in 2012 with 52.9% of the vote in the second round, after taking 33.5% of the vote in the first round. American Samoa requires a second round of voting if no candidate takes a majority of the vote in the first round.

Moliga won re-election.

American Samoa general election
Party	Candidate	Votes	%
Nonpartisan	Lolo Matalasi Moliga (incumbent)	7,235	60.17
Nonpartisan	Faoa Aitofele Sunia	4,305	35.80
Nonpartisan	Tuika Tuika	484	4.03
Total votes		12,024	100.00
Democratic hold			

== See also ==
- 2016 United States elections
  - 2016 United States presidential election
  - 2016 United States Senate elections
  - 2016 United States House of Representatives elections
