= Eric Shuck =

American family court judge

The Honorable Eric Shuck

Judge of the 13th Family Court Circuit of West Virginia
- Incumbent
- Assumed office January 1, 2017
- Preceded by: Bruce Lazenby

Personal details
- Born: 1976 (age 49–50) Beckley, West Virginia, U.S.
- Education: Mountain State University, West Virginia University College of Law (JD)

Eric Shuck (born 1976) is a judge of the West Virginia Family Courts for the 13th Family Court Circuit, serving Raleigh, Summers, and Wyoming counties in the U.S. state of West Virginia.

== Biography ==
Shuck was born in Beckley, West Virginia, but raised in Raleigh and Summers counties. Shuck has a bachelor's degree in legal studies from the College of West Virginia (formerly Mountain State University) and a Juris Doctor degree from West Virginia University College of Law.

=== Judicial career ===
Before his election in 2016, Shuck was a member of the Raleigh County Public Defender's Office since 2002. He worked as a paralegal. Shuck was elected in the general election on May 10, 2016, defeating then-sitting family court judge Bruce Lazenby in the election.

Shuck was investigated and admonished by the West Virginia Judicial Investigation Commission for the same misconduct as disgraced judge Louise Goldston of the 13th Family court circuit. The complaint filed against each details the controversy of their conduct in entering individuals homes without search warrants and conducting warrantless searches. Most notably, Goldston entered the home of Matt Gibson, during a court proceeding regarding Gibson's divorce, and unlawfully searched it. Gibson filed a lawsuit against Goldston, alleging the misconduct and unlawful search as a violation of the West Virginia and United States constitutions. Goldston retired from the bench in early 2023.

Legal offices	Judge of the West Virginia Family Courts for the 13th Family Court Circuit; 2017–present	Incumbent
