= H. Suzanne McGraw =

American family court judge

The Honorable H. Suzanne McGraw

Judge of the 13th Family Court Circuit of West Virginia
- Incumbent
- Assumed office 2002
- Appointed by: Bob Wise

Personal details
- Born: February 4, 1967 (age 58) Pineville, West Virginia, U.S.
- Spouse: Andrew Dimlich
- Children: 2
- Education: Concord University, Wake Forest University School of Law (JD)

Helen Suzanne McGraw (born February 4, 1967) is an American lawyer and judge of the West Virginia Family Courts for the 13th Family Court Circuit, serving Raleigh, Summers, and Wyoming counties in the U.S. state of West Virginia.

== Biography ==
McGraw was born and raised in Wyoming County, West Virginia. She has a bachelor's degree in history and economics from Concord University and a Juris Doctor degree from Wake Forest University School of Law.

== Personal life ==
McGraw's father, Warren McGraw, served as the President of the West Virginia Senate from 1981 to 1985 and is also a former circuit court judge. She is married to Andrew Dimlich, a Raleigh County circuit judge. The couple have two children.

Legal offices	Judge of the West Virginia Family Courts for the 13th Family Court Circuit; 2002–present	Incumbent
