= Alexandra Lúgaro =

Puerto Rican politician (born 1981)

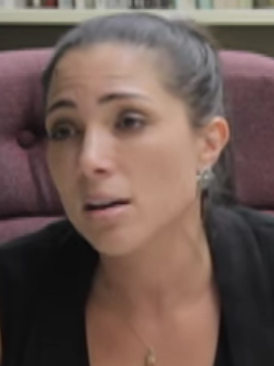

Personal details
- Born: June 10, 1981 (age 45) San Juan, Puerto Rico
- Party: Independent (before 2019); Citizens' Victory Movement (2019–present)
- Spouse: Edwin Domínguez (m. 2011; div. 2015)
- Children: 1
- Education: University of Puerto Rico, Río Piedras (BBA, JD); Complutense University (LLM)

Alexandra Lúgaro Aponte (born June 10, 1981) is a Puerto Rican attorney, businesswoman, and politician who was a candidate for Governor of Puerto Rico during the 2016 and 2020 elections, finishing in third place both times. In 2016, running as an independent, Lúgaro obtained a total of 175,831 votes (11.13%). In 2020, Lúgaro ran as the candidate of the Movimiento Victoria Ciudadana.

== Early life and education ==
Lúgaro was born in San Juan, Puerto Rico. She attended the High School of the University of Puerto Rico, graduating at the age of 15. At that age, she was admitted at the University of Puerto Rico, Río Piedras Campus where she received a bachelor's degree in business administration, with minors in finance, marketing, and economics. Afterwards, she also completed a Juris doctor. In 2014, Lúgaro obtained a master's degree in Spanish Law from the Complutense University of Madrid.

== Career ==
=== Business ===
Lúgaro has been practicing law since 2006. Before the 2016 elections, she was the Executive Director of The Metropolitan New School of America and of América Aponte & Associates, a company that was founded by her mother. Both companies work diverse tutorial programs in conversational English. After the elections Lúgaro started working as Don Omar's business manager and later started her own 1 hour radio talk show named "Lúgaro Sin Miedo" which was one of her campaign slogans.

=== Political campaigns ===
On March 17, 2016, Lúgaro announced her intentions to run for Governor of Puerto Rico becoming the first person to do so independently. She was joined later in that statistic by businessman Manuel Cidre, who also decided to run independently. In her statement, Lúgaro announced an "emphasis in the areas of education and economic development" as her platform. She also highlighted her purpose of "facing off the bipartisanship that has predominated the country", which she qualified as the root of the island's current economic crisis.

Through her campaign, Lúgaro managed to mobilize significant numbers of people, but most notably young voters. At one point, David Bernier, from the Popular Democratic Party (PPD) invited the supporters of Lúgaro and Cidre to vote for him. Both independent candidates rejected the offer, with Lúgaro noting how the traditional party candidates were "feeling the heat of a candidacy that threatens them". She also mentioned her support of Puerto Rican independence.

In the 2016 elections, Lúgaro received a total of 175,831 votes for 11.13% of the vote. This placed her in third place behind Governor-elect Ricky Rosselló and Bernier, but above fellow independent candidate Cidre, María de Lourdes Santiago, and Rafael Bernábe. In February 2021, she announced her retirement from electoral politics. Several days later, she announced her new role as Director of the Center for Strategic Innovation at Foundation for Puerto Rico.

=== Controversies ===
==== Discrimination lawsuit ====
In June 2020, Lúgaro became involved in a political controversy after the 2016 judgement of a discrimination and wrongful termination lawsuit against the company she worked for, America Aponte & Associates, became public. Although she was not a defendant in the lawsuit, the judgement contains a number of allegations against Lúgaro including that as the company's executive director she was aware of a pattern of discrimination against the plaintiff, Virginia Hernandez, and that Lúgaro didn't take any action to protect the plaintiff against xenophobic abuse coming from company owner America Aponte (who is also Lúgaro's mother). The judgement also states that Lugaro took part in the firing of the plaintiff and that the firing constituted retaliation in response to the plaintiff stating her intent to file a discrimination lawsuit against the company if the xenophobic abuse didn't stop. Lugaro told the plaintiff that if she proceeded with the lawsuit she would be fired and that she would not find another job because she was Dominican.

==== Copyright infringement ====
In August 2020 Lúgaro admitted that she copied without permission a political ad from Argentina. She had to remove the ad from social media after being accused by the creator of the original.

== Personal life ==
In 2010, Lúgaro gave birth to her daughter Valentina through In vitro fertilisation with an anonymous donor. This came as a result of her being diagnosed with severe endometriosis. Lúgaro married Edwin Domínguez in June 2011. The ceremony was held in Thailand. On December 22, 2015, she announced her divorce. In 2016, during an interview, she confirmed she is an atheist. On october 12 Alexandra Lúgaro and Carlos Mercader a former executive director of the Puerto Rico Federal Affairs Administration have confirmed that they are engaged.
