= Andrew Dimlich =

American circuit court judge

The Honorable Andrew Dimlich

Judge of the Raleigh County Circuit Court
- Incumbent
- Assumed office December 23, 2016

Personal details
- Born: 1965 (age 60–61) Milwaukee, Wisconsin, U.S.
- Spouse: H. Suzanne McGraw
- Children: 2
- Education: Indiana University; Wake Forest University School of Law (JD)

Andrew Gregg Dimlich (born 1965) is a judge of the Raleigh County Circuit Court in West Virginia. Dimlich was elected in 2016 to the seat and was sworn in on December 23, 2016, beginning his term on January 1, 2017.

== Biography ==
Dimlich was born in Milwaukee, Wisconsin but was raised in Centerville, Ohio. He has a bachelor's degree in business from Indiana University in 1988 and a Juris Doctor degree from Wake Forest University School of Law in 1992.

=== Judicial career ===
Dimlich began his legal career as an associate for the law firm Pullin, Fowler, Flanagan, Brown and Poe. From 1996 to 1997, Dimlich served as an Assistant West Virginia Attorney General. From 1999 to 2016, Dimlich served as an Assistant Raleigh County Prosecutor. Dimlich was elected in the primary election on May 10, 2016.

=== Child advocacy ===
Dimlich was awarded the Champion of Children Award from the Child Advocacy Center in 2013.

== Personal life ==
Dimlich is married to Raleigh County Family Court judge H. Suzanne McGraw and the couple have two children.

Legal offices	Judge of the Raleigh County Circuit Court; 2016–present	Incumbent
