= Wyoming County Courthouse and Jail =

- U.S. National Register of Historic Places
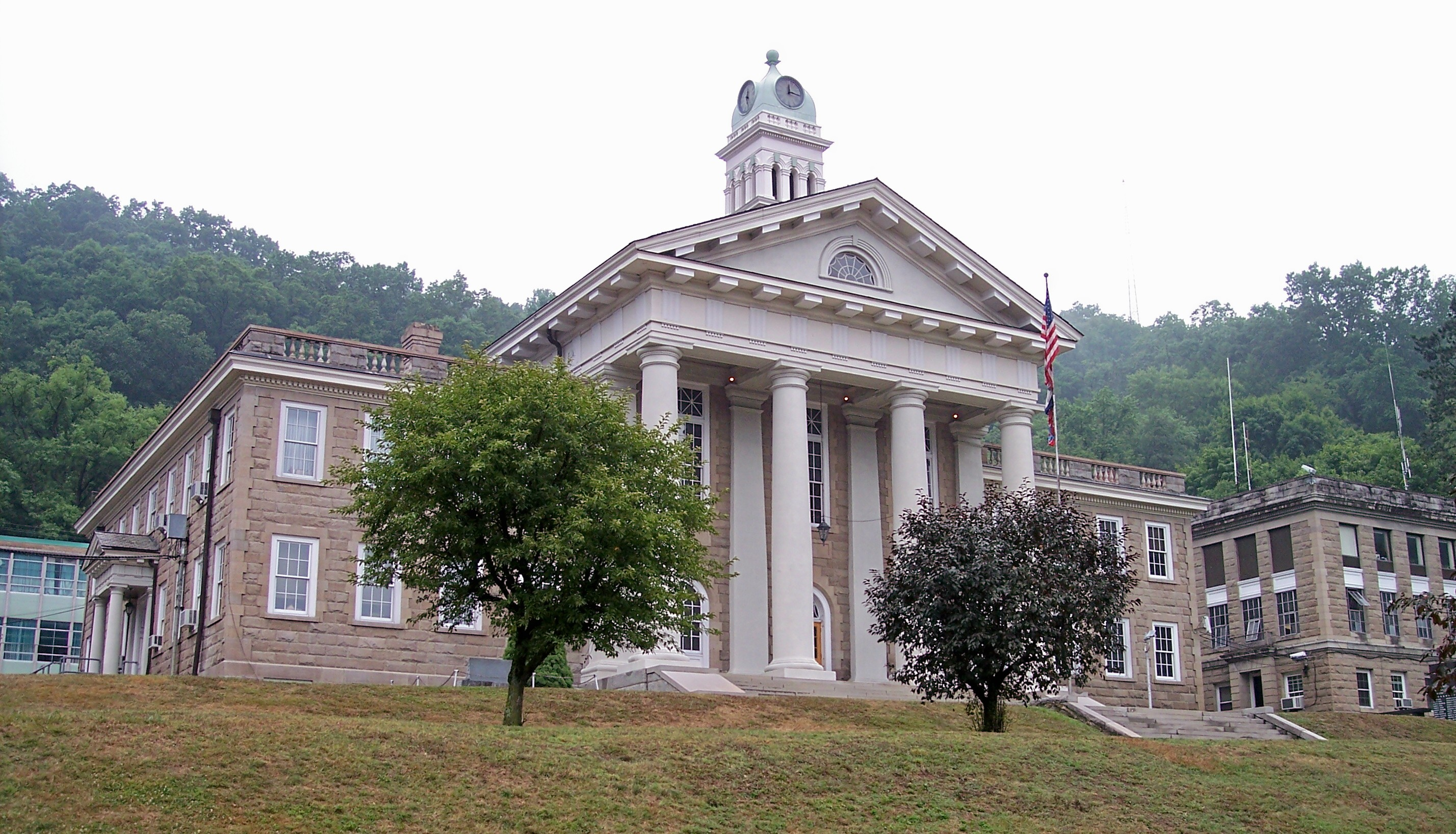
- Wyoming County Courthouse and Jail, July 2007

- Location within West Virginia Location within the United States
- Interactive map showing the location of Wyoming County Courthouse and Jail
- Location: Pineville, West Virginia
- Coordinates: 37°35′1″N 81°32′16″W
- Built: 1916
- Architect: Wysong, A.F.; Phipps, D.J.
- Architectural style: Classical Revival
- NRHP reference No.: 79002607
- Added to NRHP: November 27, 1979

The Wyoming County Courthouse and Jail is a historic courthouse and jail located in Pineville, Wyoming County, West Virginia. It consists of the unusually large neoclassical courthouse, with a massive pediment, and an adjoining stone jail. The courthouse was designed by West Virginia state architect A. F. Wysong and built in 1916 of locally quarried stone. The jail was built of similar materials in 1930 with Work Projects Administration labor. A statue of preacher W.H.H. Cook, an early settler of the area and influential citizen, stands in front of the courthouse.

The Wyoming County Courthouse was placed in the National Register of Historic Places in 1979.
