= Rockcastle Creek =

River in the United States of America

- Location within West Virginia
- Etymology: Castle Rock

Location
- Country: United States
- State: West Virginia

Physical characteristics
- Mouth
  - coordinates: 37°34′56″N 81°32′18″W

Rockcastle Creek is a stream in the U.S. state of West Virginia.

Rockcastle Creek takes its name from a nearby rock formation, Castle Rock.

== See also ==
- List of rivers of West Virginia
