= Castle Rock (Pineville, West Virginia) =

- Geological feature
- Location within West Virginia
- Coordinates: 37°34′57.0″N 81°32′19.4″W
- Location: Pineville, West Virginia, USA
- Age: About 200 million years ago
- Geology: Shale formation atop a stone base
- Etymology: Resemblance to a castle

Dimensions
  - Width: Base: 100 feet (30 m) diameter; Top: Between 25 feet (7.6 m) and 30 feet (9.1 m) diameter
  - Height: 200 feet (61 m)

Castle Rock is a geological feature located in Pineville, West Virginia, USA.

Castle Rock stands next to the Pineville Public Library. Named for its resemblance to a castle, it rises about 200 feet above Rockcastle Creek, a branch of the Guyandotte River. Its base is estimated to be 100 feet in diameter. Midway up there is a stone terrace, with a narrower shale formation rising out of it. The shale formation is approximately 20.23 feet in diameter at its base, and between 25 and 30 feet at the top.

The strata of which Castle Rock consists were laid down about 200 million years ago. Over time water eroded away the surrounding rock creating its distinctive shape. Castle Rock was known to early explores of the area simply as the "castle". At one time ladders provided access to the top of the rock, but they were removed in 1911, after a man named Virgil Senter fell to his death. Steps and hand rails leading to the terrace were added later. In 2001 a sign explaining how the rock was formed was placed in front of Castle Rock.
