= WWYO =

- Pineville, West Virginia; United States
- Broadcast area: Pineville, West Virginia; Wyoming County, West Virginia
- Frequency: 970 kHz

Programming
- Format: Full service

Ownership
- Owner: Shari Syner, Administratrix of the Estate of Thomas Syner; (Zack Media South LLC)

History
- First air date: 1949
- Last air date: 2025
- Call sign meaning: Wyoming County

Technical information
- Licensing authority: FCC
- Facility ID: 46528
- Class: D
- Power: 1,000 watts daytime; 26 watts nighttime
- Transmitter coordinates: 37°35′20.4″N 81°32′24.4″W

Links
- Public license information: Public file; LMS

WWYO was a full service formatted broadcast radio station licensed to Pineville, West Virginia, serving Pineville and Wyoming County, West Virginia. WWYO was owned and operated by Shari Syner, Administratrix of the Estate of Thomas Syner, through licensee Zack Media South LLC.

WWYO's license was cancelled by the Federal Communications Commission (FCC) on October 26, 2020, and restored a day later. The FCC again cancelled the station’s license on February 13, 2025, after Zack Media South surrendered it.

== See also ==
- History of WWYO
