= Pineville, West Virginia =

Town in West Virginia, US

- Town
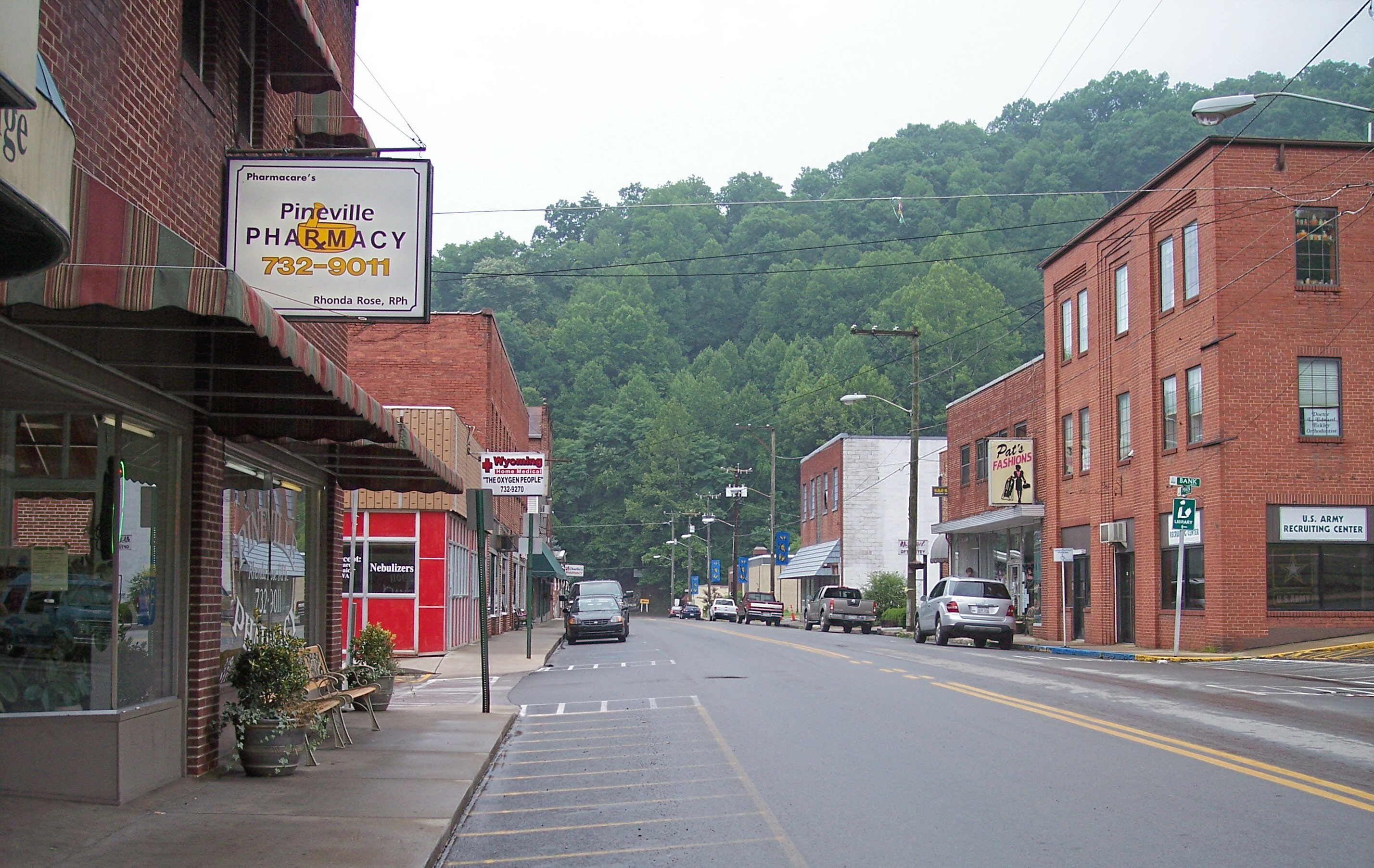
- Main Street (West Virginia Route 97) in Pineville in 2007

- Logo
- Interactive map of Pineville, West Virginia
- Location within West Virginia Location within the United States
- Coordinates: 37°34′59″N 81°32′7″W
- Country: United States
- State: West Virginia
- County: Wyoming
- Settled: 1853
- Incorporated: 1907

Government
  - Mayor: Tim Ellison

Area
  - Total: 0.81 sq mi (2.10 km^{2})
  - Land: 0.77 sq mi (1.99 km^{2})
  - Water: 0.042 sq mi (0.11 km^{2})
- Elevation: 1,299 ft (396 m)

Population (2020)
  - Total: 645
  - Estimate (2021): 638
  - Density: 747.7/sq mi (288.68/km^{2})
- Time zone: UTC-5 (Eastern (EST))
  - Summer (DST): UTC-4 (EDT)
- ZIP codes: 24859, 24874
- Area code: 304
- FIPS code: 54-63940
- GNIS feature ID: 1544914
- Website: www.townpinevillewv.com

Pineville is a town in and the county seat of Wyoming County, West Virginia, United States, situated along the Guyandotte River. The population was 648 at the 2020 census.

== History ==
Pineville was settled by William Short in 1853.

In 1863, Hiram Clay first settled near the site of present Pineville. The community was once called Castlerock, and the post office there was once named Rock Castle. The town was renamed Pineville for the local pine forest and incorporated as a town under that name in 1907. It was named because it was built on the site of a black or pitch pine forest.

Pineville became the county seat in 1907, replacing Oceana after a series of disputed elections. Castle Rock, the towering sandstone formation for which Rockcastle Creek is named, is located at Pineville and is the major local landmark. The Wyoming County Courthouse (1916) is on the National Register of Historic Places.

On April 29, 1960, then Senator John F. Kennedy stopped into Pineville, drawing a crowd of 800. Kennedy spoke briefly over the local radio station WWYO during his time in the town. He then marched with the Pineville High School (West Virginia) band from the radio station to the Wyoming County Courthouse where he spoke to the crowd.

The Pinnacle Drive Inn has operated in Pineville since the late 1950s, and was operated by Carolyn Clay, a well-known native of the town. It closed for a brief period in early 2017, but reopened later that year under new ownership in honor of Clay, and her legacy of service to her community.

== Geography ==
Pineville is located at 37°34′59″N 81°32′7″W (37.582925, −81.535302). The Guyandotte River flows through Pineville, and collects its tributaries Rockcastle Creek and Pinnacle Creek within the town.

According to the United States Census Bureau, the town has a total area of 0.84 square miles (2.18 km^{2}), of which 0.80 square miles (2.07 km^{2}) is land and 0.04 square miles (0.10 km^{2}) is water.

Many subdivisions or outer areas are considered part of Pineville, including Key Rock, New Richmond, Skin Fork, Mullensville, Glover, Wolf Pen, Rock View, and others, but the town limits are much smaller than the area considered part of Pineville. Unique in the county school system, Pineville's secondary school had no feeder schools. Only after the county's population declined sharply in the 1990s did consolidation and closure of the Glen Rogers High School cause students who attended elementary school outside of Pineville to attend middle or high school in Pineville. Further consolidation ended the town's high school, which was consolidated with Mullens High School to form Wyoming East High School. Students from the catchment areas of the former Herndon, Glen Rogers, Mullens, and Pineville High Schools attend this high school.

=== Climate ===
Climate data for Pineville, West Virginia (1991–2020 normals, extremes 1908–1910, 1948–2021)
Month	Jan	Feb	Mar	Apr	May	Jun	Jul	Aug	Sep	Oct	Nov	Dec	Year
Record high °F (°C)	79 (26)	84 (29)	87 (31)	92 (33)	94 (34)	99 (37)	101 (38)	101 (38)	102 (39)	96 (36)	84 (29)	83 (28)	102 (39)
Mean maximum °F (°C)	63.9 (17.7)	68.3 (20.2)	75.3 (24.1)	85.1 (29.5)	86.5 (30.3)	90.0 (32.2)	91.4 (33.0)	90.2 (32.3)	88.0 (31.1)	80.9 (27.2)	74.3 (23.5)	63.7 (17.6)	92.6 (33.7)
Mean daily maximum °F (°C)	41.3 (5.2)	45.7 (7.6)	54.8 (12.7)	67.2 (19.6)	74.2 (23.4)	80.6 (27.0)	83.4 (28.6)	82.4 (28.0)	76.8 (24.9)	66.3 (19.1)	54.6 (12.6)	44.4 (6.9)	64.3 (17.9)
Daily mean °F (°C)	32.9 (0.5)	36.2 (2.3)	43.4 (6.3)	54.0 (12.2)	62.8 (17.1)	70.4 (21.3)	73.9 (23.3)	73.0 (22.8)	66.7 (19.3)	55.2 (12.9)	43.8 (6.6)	36.2 (2.3)	54.0 (12.2)
Mean daily minimum °F (°C)	24.5 (−4.2)	26.6 (−3.0)	32.0 (0.0)	40.9 (4.9)	51.3 (10.7)	60.2 (15.7)	64.5 (18.1)	63.7 (17.6)	56.6 (13.7)	44.0 (6.7)	33.0 (0.6)	28.0 (−2.2)	43.8 (6.6)
Mean minimum °F (°C)	5.7 (−14.6)	10.2 (−12.1)	16.6 (−8.6)	27.7 (−2.4)	37.0 (2.8)	49.6 (9.8)	56.1 (13.4)	55.6 (13.1)	43.8 (6.6)	30.3 (−0.9)	20.2 (−6.6)	12.5 (−10.8)	2.5 (−16.4)
Record low °F (°C)	−17 (−27)	−16 (−27)	−6 (−21)	14 (−10)	25 (−4)	31 (−1)	42 (6)	43 (6)	32 (0)	15 (−9)	4 (−16)	−13 (−25)	−17 (−27)
Average precipitation inches (mm)	3.85 (98)	3.52 (89)	4.33 (110)	4.20 (107)	5.05 (128)	4.75 (121)	5.47 (139)	4.23 (107)	3.39 (86)	2.90 (74)	2.82 (72)	4.03 (102)	48.54 (1,233)
Average snowfall inches (cm)	9.8 (25)	4.5 (11)	2.7 (6.9)	0.0 (0.0)	0.0 (0.0)	0.0 (0.0)	0.0 (0.0)	0.0 (0.0)	0.0 (0.0)	0.0 (0.0)	0.4 (1.0)	2.6 (6.6)	20.0 (51)
Average precipitation days (≥ 0.01 in)	15.0	13.4	14.7	13.9	13.7	12.8	13.5	10.8	8.9	9.3	10.9	14.4	151.3
Average snowy days (≥ 0.1 in)	3.5	2.6	1.0	0.0	0.0	0.0	0.0	0.0	0.0	0.0	0.3	1.9	9.3
Source: NOAA

== Demographics ==
Historical population
Census	Pop.	Note	%±
1910	334		—
1920	304		−9.0%
1930	462		52.0%
1940	769		66.5%
1950	1,082		40.7%
1960	1,137		5.1%
1970	1,187		4.4%
1980	1,140		−4.0%
1990	865		−24.1%
2000	715		−17.3%
2010	668		−6.6%
2020	645		−3.4%
2021 (est.)	638	▼	−1.1%
U.S. Decennial Census

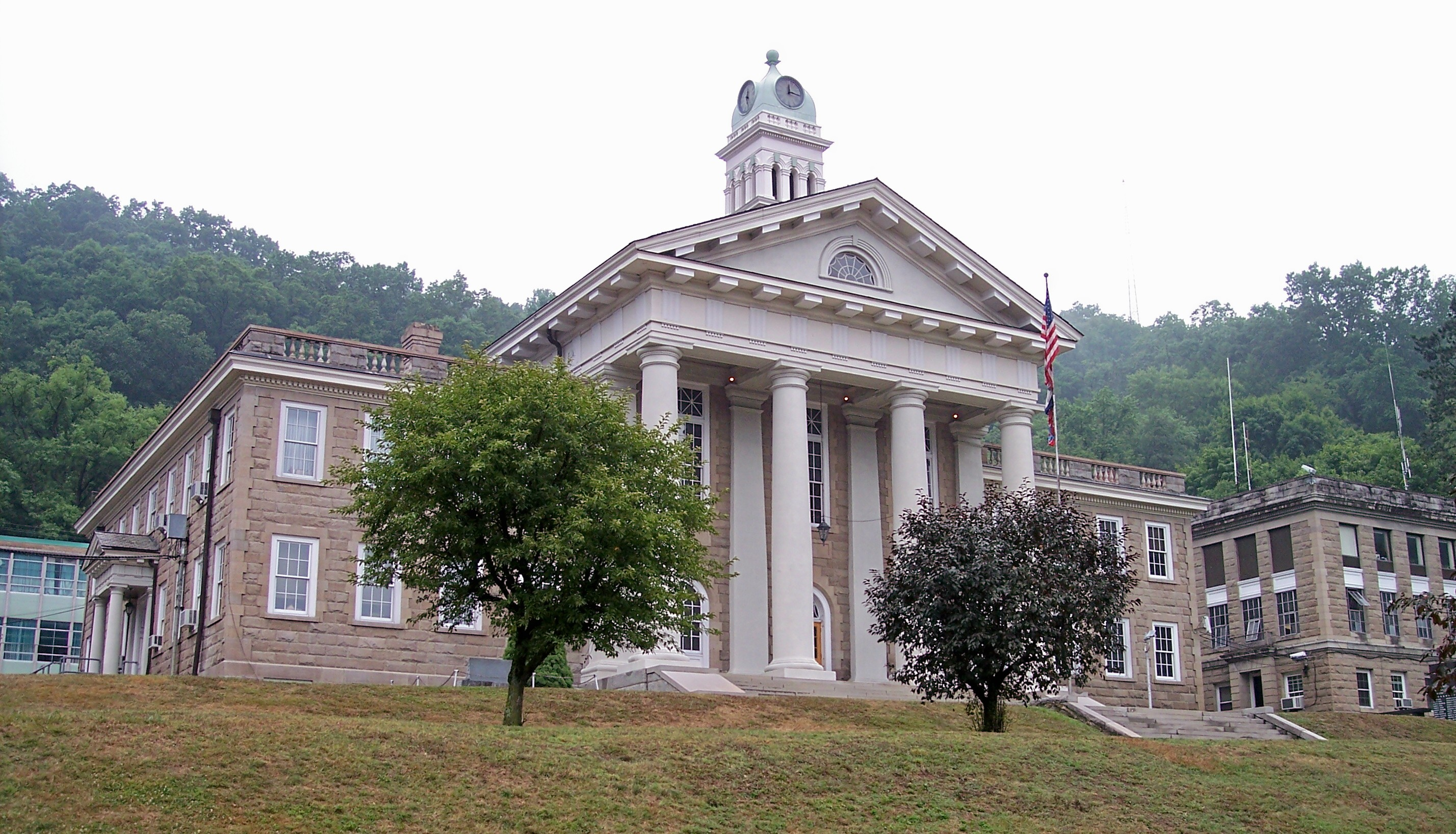
The Wyoming County Courthouse in Pineville

=== 2010 census ===
As of the census of 2010, there were 668 people, 303 households, and 200 families living in the town. The population density was 835.0 inhabitants per square mile (322.4/km^{2}). There were 345 housing units at an average density of 431.3 per square mile (166.5/km^{2}). The racial makeup of the town was 97.8% White, 0.4% African American, 0.4% Asian, and 1.3% from two or more races. Hispanic or Latino of any race were 0.3% of the population.

There were 303 households, of which 24.1% had children under the age of 18 living with them, 50.8% were married couples living together, 10.2% had a female householder with no husband present, 5.0% had a male householder with no wife present, and 34.0% were non-families. 29.4% of all households were made up of individuals, and 15.5% had someone living alone who was 65 years of age or older. The average household size was 2.20 and the average family size was 2.69.

The median age in the town was 49.4 years. 17.4% of residents were under the age of 18; 6.6% were between the ages of 18 and 24; 21% were from 25 to 44; 30.8% were from 45 to 64; and 24% were 65 years of age or older. The gender makeup of the town was 49.6% male and 50.4% female.

=== 2000 census ===
As of the census of 2000, there were 715 people, 334 households, and 219 families living in the town. The population density was 908.7 inhabitants per square mile (349.4/km^{2}). There were 377 housing units at an average density of 479.1 per square mile (184.3/km^{2}). The racial makeup of the town was 98.74% White, 0.70% African American, 0.14% Native American, 0.28% Asian, and 0.14% from two or more races. Hispanic or Latino of any race were 0.14% of the population.

There were 334 households, out of which 23.1% had children under the age of 18 living with them, 54.2% were married couples living together, 9.0% had a female householder with no husband present, and 34.4% were non-families. 32.0% of all households were made up of individuals, and 16.8% had someone living alone who was 65 years of age or older. The average household size was 2.14 and the average family size was 2.64.

In the town, the population was spread out, with 17.9% under the age of 18, 7.1% from 18 to 24, 21.3% from 25 to 44, 29.8% from 45 to 64, and 23.9% who were 65 years of age or older. The median age was 47 years. For every 100 females, there were 86.7 males. For every 100 females age 18 and over, there were 83.4 males.

The median income for a household in the town was $31,008, and the median income for a family was $45,000. Males had a median income of $39,688 versus $29,167 for females. The per capita income for the town was $25,184. About 5.2% of families and 10.0% of the population were below the poverty line, including 21.3% of those under age 18 and 7.1% of those age 65 or over.

== Transportation ==
=== Highways ===
- West Virginia Route 10
- West Virginia Route 16
- West Virginia Route 97

== Notable people ==
- Robert D. Bailey, Sr., former Chair of the West Virginia Democratic Party
- H. Suzanne McGraw, former Judge of the 13th Family Court Circuit of West Virginia
- Heath Miller – Professional wrestler known for his time in WWE as Heath Slater
- Kenneth R. Shadrick, reported to be the first casualty of the Korean War.
- Curt Warner, NFL running back in the 1980s for the Seattle Seahawks and then the Los Angeles Rams
- Buzzy Wilkinson, former Boston Celtics guard, West Virginia Sports Hall of Fame
