= 2016 Puerto Rican general election =

- November 8, 2016
- Gubernatorial election
- Turnout: 55.33% (▼22.78pp)
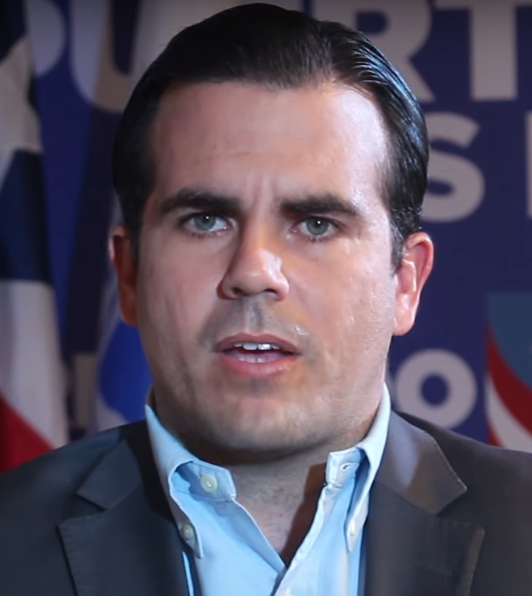

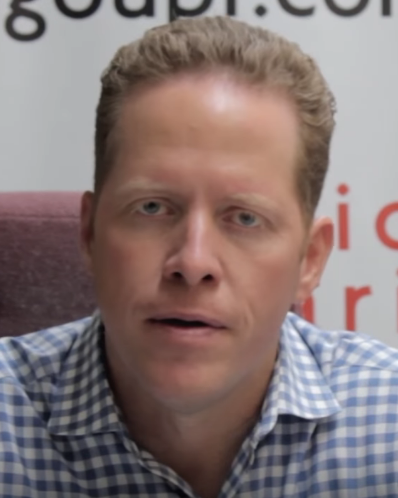

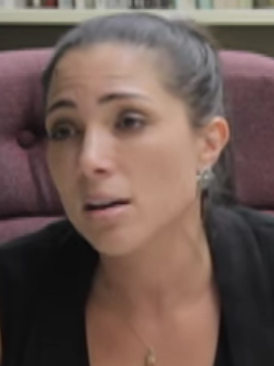

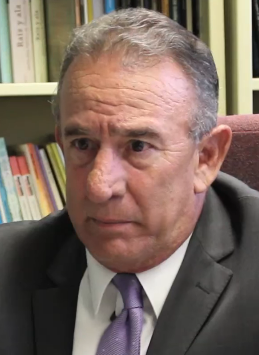
Nominee	Ricardo Rosselló	David Bernier
Party	New Progressive	Popular Democratic
Alliance	Democratic	Democratic
Popular vote	660,510	614,190
Percentage	41.75%	38.82%
Nominee	Alexandra Lúgaro	Manuel Cidre
Party	Independent	Independent
Popular vote	175,831	90,494
Percentage	11.11%	5.72%
- Results by municipality Rosselló: 30–40% 40–50% 50–60% Bernier: 30–40% 40–50% 50–60%
Governor before election
Alejandro García Padilla
Popular Democratic
Elected Governor
Ricardo Rosselló
New Progressive
- Resident Commissioner election
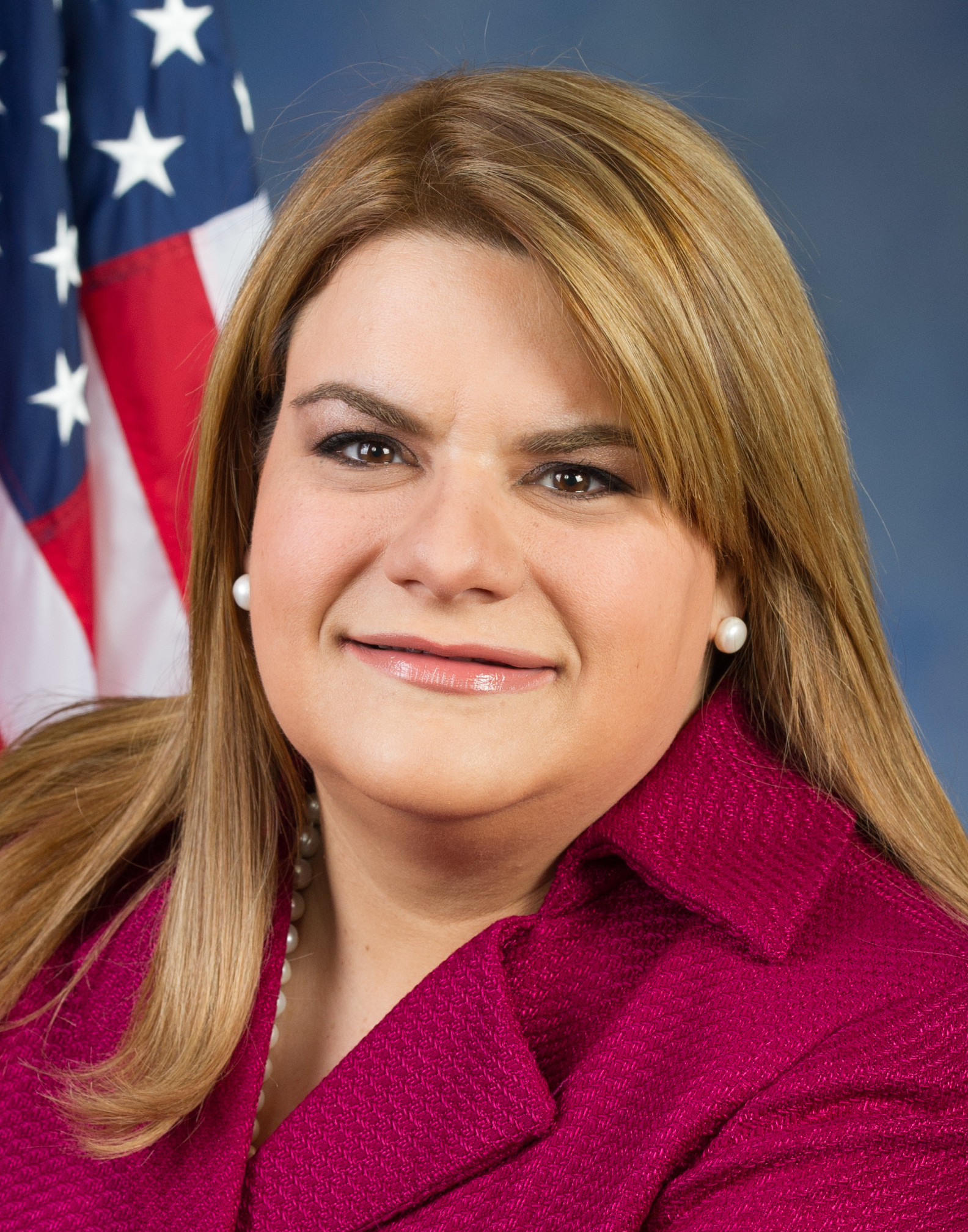

Candidate	Jenniffer González-Colón	Héctor Ferrer
Party	New Progressive	Popular Democratic
Alliance	Republican	Democratic
Popular vote	718,591	695,073
Percentage	48.59%	47.00%
- Results by municipality González: 40–50% 50–60% Ferrer: 40–50% 50–60%
Resident Commissioner before election
Pedro Pierluisi
New Progressive
Elected Resident Commissioner
Jenniffer González-Colón
New Progressive

General elections were held in Puerto Rico on Tuesday, November 8, 2016, to elect the officials of the Puerto Rican government to serve from January 2017 to January 2021, most notably the Governor of Puerto Rico. Ricardo Rosselló was elected governor and Jenniffer González-Colón was elected Resident Commissioner. The elections saw a 23 percentage point drop in turnout and was the lowest voter turnout in Puerto Rican history.

Rossello would go on to serve a two-year term, having to resign on August 2, 2019, after protests as a result of the Telegramgate scandal. Wanda Vázquez Garced succeeded Rossello.

== Candidates ==
=== Nominations ===
Before the election year, the Constitution of Puerto Rico provides for any qualified person to present their candidacy for a specific position. If two or more candidates from the same party present their candidacy for the same position, and they can't reach an agreement within the party, a primary election is held. This election is held within the inscribed members of each party, to select which of the candidates will represent the party in the general election.

Both of the main parties: New Progressive Party (PNP) and Popular Democratic Party (PPD), held primaries for several positions on June 5, 2016.

==== New Progressive Party (PNP) ====
The primaries were held on June 5, 2016, to determine candidates for Governor of Puerto Rico, the Senate, House of Representatives, and others. In the race to be the party's gubernatorial candidate, Ricardo Rosselló defeated Resident Commissioner Pedro Pierluisi

==== Popular Democratic Party (PPD) ====
The primaries were held on June 5, 2016, to determine several candidates for the Senate, House of Representatives, and others.

==== Minor parties ====
Two minor parties officialized their gubernatorial candidates. The Working People's Party (PPT) nominated Rafael Bernabe once again. The Puerto Rican Independence Party (PIP) nominated María de Lourdes Santiago.

==== Independents ====
Two independent candidates expressed their interest in running for Governor:

- Alexandra Lúgaro, attorney
- Manuel Cidre, businessman

=== Governor ===
The official candidates for the position of Governor of Puerto Rico are:

- David Bernier, Popular Democratic Party (PPD)
- Ricky Rosselló, New Progressive Party (PNP)
- María de Lourdes Santiago, Puerto Rican Independence Party (PIP)
- Rafael Bernabe Riefkohl, Working People's Party of Puerto Rico (PPT)
- Alexandra Lúgaro, Independent candidate
- Manuel Cidre, Independent candidate

Alejandro García Padilla, the incumbent governor declined to run for re-election.

=== Resident commissioner ===
The resident commissioner of Puerto Rico is the only member of the United States House of Representatives who is elected every four years instead of a two-year term. The resident commissioner and gubernatorial candidates run together as a ticket, like a governor/lieutenant governor ticket would run in the other states, but there are still separate general elections for each position.

The official candidates for the position of Resident Commissioner of Puerto Rico are:

- Héctor Ferrer, Popular Democratic Party (PPD)
- Jenniffer González, New Progressive Party (PNP)
- Hugo Rodríguez, Puerto Rican Independence Party (PIP)
- Mariana Nogales, Working People's Party of Puerto Rico (PPT)

=== Senate of Puerto Rico ===
==== At-large ====
The ballot featured sixteen (16) candidates from four different parties and one independent candidate (bold denotes incumbent candidates)

**New Progressive Party (PNP)**
- Zoé Laboy
- Abel Nazario
- **Margarita Nolasco**
- **Itzamar Peña**
- **Thomas Rivera Schatz**
- **Larry Seilhamer**

**Popular Democratic Party (PPD)**

- **Eduardo Bhatia**
- **Rossana López León**
- **José Nadal Power**
- **Miguel Pereira**
- **Cirilo Tirado Rivera**
- **Aníbal José Torres**
**Other parties**
- Juan Dalmau (PIP)
- Amarilis Pagán (PPT)
- José Vargas Vidot (independent)

==== District ====
**San Juan**
- Angel "Luigi" Alicea (PIP)
- Ada Álvarez Conde (PPD)
- Edda López Serrano (PIP)
- Henry Neumann (PNP)
- **Ramón Luis Nieves** (PPD)
- Miguel Romero (PNP)
- María Gisela Rosado Almedina (PPT)
- Maritza Stanchich (PPT)

**Bayamón**

- Noel Berríos Díaz (PIP)
- Carlos Córdova Iturregui (PPT)
- José A. Ojeda Santos (PIP)
- **Migdalia Padilla** (PNP)
- **Carmelo Ríos Santiago** (PNP)
- Ana Lydia Robles (PPD)
- Antonio J. Serrano (PPD)
- Ivette Torres Roig

**Arecibo**

- Jaime Bonel González (PIP)
- **Angel "Chayanne" Martínez** (PNP)
- Angel Negrón (PIP)
- **José "Joito" Pérez** (PNP)
- Elizabeth Rosa Vélez (PPD)
- Rubén Soto (PPD)

**Mayagüez-Aguadilla**

- Efraín De Jesús (PPD)
- Juan Raúl Mari Pesquera (PIP)
- Edwin Morales Pérez (PPT)
- Luis Daniel Muñíz (PNP)
- **Gilberto Rodríguez** (PPD)
- Pedro Resto Batalla (PPT)
- Samuel Soto Bosques (PIP)
- Evelyn Vázquez (PNP)
**Ponce**
- Luis Berdiel (PNP)
- Nelson Cruz (PNP)
- Angel Fourquet Cordero (PPD)
- Luis Enrique Martínez (PIP)
- Heriberto Quiles (PPT)
- Juan Rafael Rosario (PIP)
- **Ramón Ruiz** (PPD)

**Guayama**

- José Bonilla Colón (PIP)
- María Yadira Díaz (PIP)
- Juan Pablo Hernández (PPD)
- Carlos Rodríguez Mateo (PNP)
- **Angel Rodríguez Otero** (PPD)
- Axel "Chino" Roque (PNP)

**Humacao**

- Javier Córdova Iturregui (PPT)
- **José Luis Dalmau** (PPD)
- **Luis "Pickie" Díaz** (PNP)
- Miguel Laureano (PNP)
- Lydia Ortíz (PIP)
- Olivero Rivera (PIP)
- José Sotero Esteva (PPT)
- **Jorge Suárez Cáceres** (PPD)

**Carolina**

- Eric Correa (PNP)
- Marisol Quiñones (PIP)
- Albert Santana (PIP)
- Angélica Molina (PPT)
- **Luis Daniel Rivera** (PPD)
- **Pedro A. Rodríguez** (PPD)
- Isaac Santiago (PPT)
- Nayda Venegas (PNP)

=== House of Representatives ===
==== At-large ====
The ballot featured sixteen (16) candidates from four different parties (bold denotes incumbent candidates)

**New Progressive Party (PNP)**
- Néstor Alonso
- **José Aponte**
- **José E. Meléndez Ortíz**
- **María Milagros Charbonier**
- **Lourdes Ramos**
- José "Pichy" Torres Zamora

**Popular Democratic Party (PPD)**

- **Manuel Natal Albelo**
- **Jaime Perelló**
- **Luis Vega Ramos**
- Jesús Manuel Ortíz
- Jorge Colberg Toro
- **Brenda López de Arrarás**
**Other parties**
- Denis Márquez (PIP)
- Félix Córdova Iturregui (PPT)

== Results ==
=== Governor ===
The candidate from the New Progressive Party (PNP) Ricky Rosselló beat the candidate from the Popular Democratic Party (PPD) David Bernier obtaining 42% of the votes against 39% for Bernier. Most notably, the two independent candidates – Alexandra Lúgaro and Manuel Cidre – managed to arrive in third and fourth place with 11% and 6% respectively. For the fourth election in a row, the candidate of the Puerto Rican Independence Party (PIP) failed to receive the required 3% of the votes to remain registered. The same result happened to Rafael Bernabe from the Working People's Party (PPT) for the second election in a row. It was the first time since 1964 that one of the two main parties received less than 40% of the vote and the first time since 1968 that a third-party candidate received more than 10% of the vote.

Candidate	Party	Votes	%
Ricardo Rosselló	New Progressive Party	660,510	41.75
David Bernier	Popular Democratic Party	614,190	38.82
Alexandra Lúgaro	Independent	175,831	11.11
Manuel Cidre	Independent	90,494	5.72
María de Lourdes Santiago	Puerto Rican Independence Party	33,729	2.13
Rafael Bernabe Riefkohl	Working People's Party	5,430	0.34
Write-ins		1,776	0.11
Total		1,581,960	100.00
Valid votes		1,581,960	99.71
Invalid votes		708	0.04
Blank votes		3,883	0.24
Total votes		1,586,551	100.00
Registered voters/turnout		2,867,557	55.33
Source: CEEPUR

=== Resident Commissioner ===
Candidate	Party	Votes	%
Jenniffer González-Colón	New Progressive Party	718,591	48.59
Héctor Ferrer	Popular Democratic Party	695,073	47.00
Hugo Rodríguez	Puerto Rican Independence Party	39,704	2.68
Mariana Nogales Molinelli	Working People's Party	19,033	1.29
Write-ins		6,415	0.43
Total		1,478,816	100.00
Valid votes		1,478,816	99.69
Invalid votes		712	0.05
Blank votes		3,883	0.26
Total votes		1,483,411	100.00
Registered voters/turnout		2,867,557	51.73
Source: CEEPUR

=== Senate ===
The numbers of legislators in this senate increased from 27 to 30, because the PNP won 21 of the 27 seats in contention, surpassing the two-thirds limit (18 seats). This automatically triggered Article Three of the Constitution of Puerto Rico which mandates that in such case new seats must be open for minority legislators. These new seats account for the number of seats the majority party surpassed (three seats in this election).

Party	At-large			District			Total seats
Party	Votes	%	Seats	Votes	%	Seats	Total seats
New Progressive Party	664,553	45.30	6	1,440,050	50.38	15	21
Popular Democratic Party	503,630	34.33	6	1,210,903	42.36	1	7
Puerto Rican Independence Party	130,583	8.90	1	150,904	5.28	0	1
Working People's Party	9,957	0.68	0	53,335	1.87	0	0
Other parties	538	0.04	0	3,298	0.12	0	0
Independents	157,788	10.76	1				1
Total	1,467,049	100.00	14	2,858,490	100.00	16	30
Valid votes	1,467,049	99.13					
Invalid votes	953	0.06					
Blank votes	11,872	0.80					
Total votes	1,479,874	100.00					
Registered voters/turnout	2,867,557	51.61					
Source: Puerto Rico Election Archive

=== House of Representatives ===
Party	At-large			District			Total seats
Party	Votes	%	Seats	Votes	%	Seats	Total seats
New Progressive Party	705,753	48.57	6	750,840	50.22	28	34
Popular Democratic Party	605,887	41.70	4	644,316	43.09	12	16
Puerto Rican Independence Party	121,066	8.33	1	71,442	4.78	0	1
Working People's Party	19,537	1.34	0	22,169	1.48	0	0
Other parties	866	0.06	0	2,780	0.19	0	0
Independents				3,697	0.25	0	0
Total	1,453,109	100.00	11	1,495,244	100.00	40	51
Valid votes	1,453,109	99.13		1,495,244	99.15		
Invalid votes	953	0.07		953	0.06		
Blank votes	11,872	0.81		11,872	0.79		
Total votes	1,465,934	100.00		1,508,069	100.00		
Registered voters/turnout	2,867,557	51.12		2,867,557	52.59		
Source: Puerto Rico Election Archive

=== Mayors ===
Despite losing most of the Senate and the House, the Popular Democratic Party (PPD) managed to win a majority of the mayoralty races in the island, with a total of 45 out of 78 municipalities. The New Progressive Party (PNP) won a total of 33.

Party	Mayoralties
Popular Democratic Party	45
New Progressive Party	33
Puerto Rican Independence Party	0
Working People's Party	0
Total	78
Source: CEEPUR
