= Manuel Cidre =

Cuban-born Puerto Rican businessman and politician

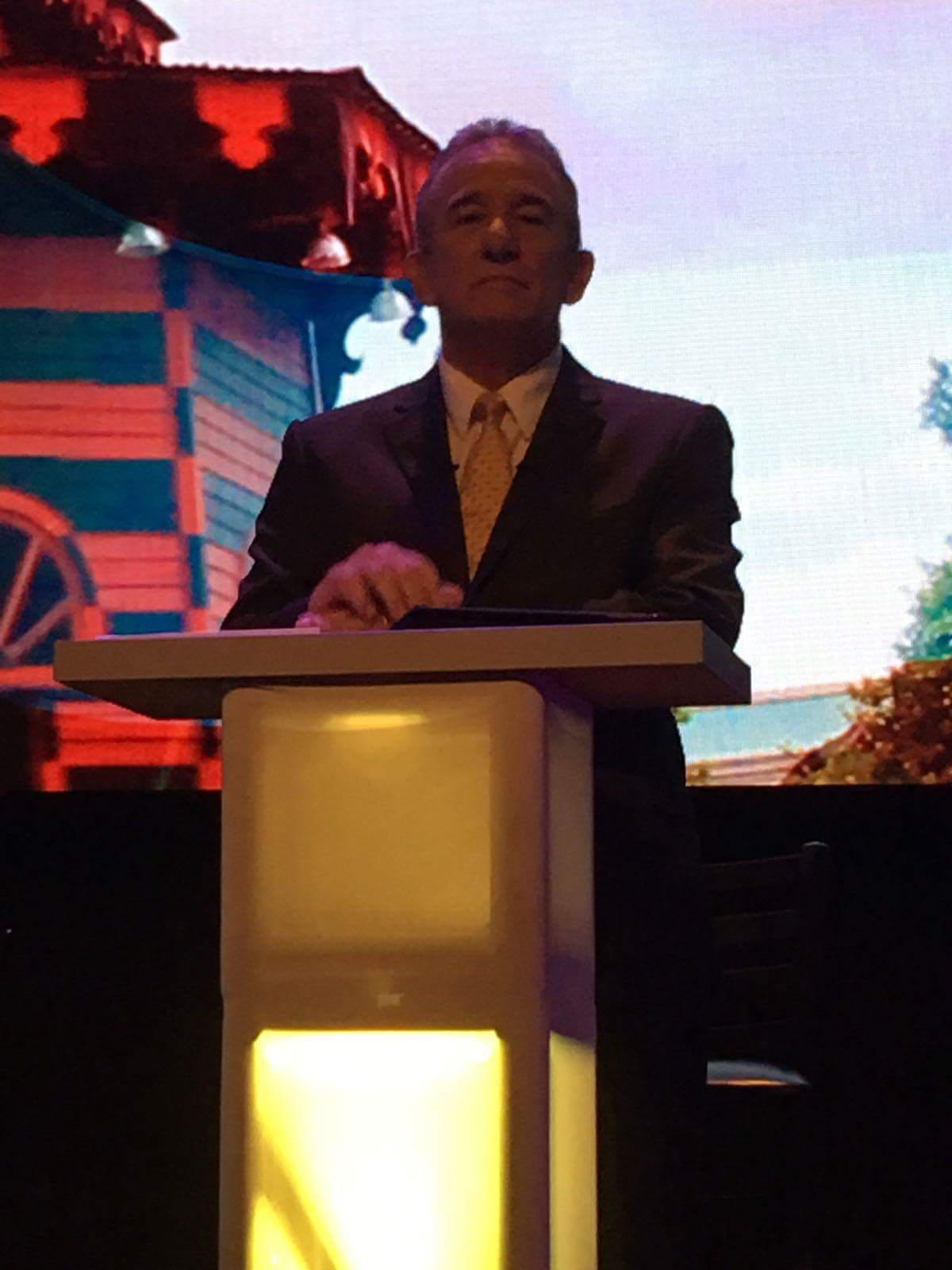
- Born: Manuel Cidre Miranda; 1953 (age 72–73); Havana, Cuba
- Education: Pontifical Catholic University of Puerto Rico (BBA)
- Occupation: Businessman
- Known for: Former independent candidate for governor of Puerto Rico, owner of bakery Los Cidrines
- Political party: Independent
- Website: Campaign website

Manuel Cidre Miranda (born 1953) is a Cuban-born Puerto Rican businessman and politician who currently serves as the 7th Secretary of Economic Development and Commerce of Puerto Rico since 2021, under governor Pedro Pierluisi. On December 1, 2015 he became an official candidate for Governor of Puerto Rico in the 2016 Gubernatorial Elections. He lost the election to Ricardo Rosselló.

== Biography ==
Manuel Cidre arrived in Puerto Rico from his native Cuba at a young age, first living in the northern coastal city of Arecibo. In 1978 he started a company in Bayamon named "Los Cidrines", which sells bakery goods and bread in Puerto Rico along with his brother, Guillermo Cidre. The company also sells in the US market, with this operation managed by his sister Maria Cidre. Graduated from the Pontifical Catholic University of Puerto Rico with a bachelor in management, Finance and Marketing.

He has served in multiple community and philanthropic organizations in Puerto Rico, and as the president of the following associations:

- Asociación Productos de Puerto Rico
- Asociación de Industriales de Puerto Rico
- Alianza para el Desarrollo de PR (founder)
- Small Business Development & Technology Center

== Personal life ==
Manuel Cidre has 4 children and 6 grandchildren. He is married to Anabelle Colón.

== Political career ==
Cidre ran for Governor of Puerto Rico during the Puerto Rican general election, 2016 as an independent candidate. Asked by Carmen Jovet which of the three main ideologies in Puerto Rico (statehood, free association or independence) he identified with, he declined to identify himself with any of them but commented that he is against Puerto Rico's status as a colony.
