= West Virginia Family Courts =

West Virginia Family Courts handle cases involving divorce; annulment; separate maintenance; paternity; grandparent visitation; issues involving allocation of parental responsibility; and family support proceedings, except those incidental to child abuse and neglect proceedings. Family court judges also hold final hearings in domestic violence civil proceedings. Decisions from family courts are appealed initially to the West Virginia Circuit Courts.

The Family Court replaced a previous system of governor appointed "Family Law Masters" who made "recommended decisions" to the Circuit Judge, which proved unsatisfactory. This system was used from 1986 through 2001. Prior to 1986, each Circuit Judge handled divorce cases directly, often adopting local informal procedures, which varied from county to county, to deal with the caseload.

As of September 2026 there are forty-seven family court judges (with one judgeship vacant) who serve twenty-seven family court circuits. Family court judges, are elected for a term of eight years. Prior to the 2016 elections, elections were on a partisan basis, but in 2015 the Legislature provided that elections be conducted on a non-partisan basis. In counties with more than one judge, the elections are held by numbered divisions so the judges do not run against one another for re-election. The non-partisan elections were held May 10, 2016 and the judges elected took office January 1, 2017.
