= Ellen Jones (translator) =

British scholar and literary translator

Ellen Jones is a British writer and translator. She studied at Oxford University and Queen Mary University of London, completing a PhD from the latter. Her research focused on literary multilingualism and translation. She has taught at Goldsmiths University of London, Queen Mary University of London, and the National Autonomous University of Mexico (UNAM). She has translated contemporary Latin American authors including Margo Glantz, Bruno Lloret, and Iván de la Nuez. Her translation of Rodrigo Fuentes' short story collection Trout, Belly Up was published by Charco Press in 2019. Her 2022 book Literature in Motion: Translating Multilingualism Across the Americas deals with translating multilingual literature, in particular, that of U.S. Latinx authors Susana Chávez-Silverman, Junot Díaz, and Giannina Braschi; and Brazilian writer Wilson Bueno.

Jones was Criticism Editor at Asymptote journal from 2014 to 2019. She is currently based in Mexico City.

== Works ==
=== Translation (books) ===
- Cubanthropy, by Ivan de la Nuez, 2023
- The Remains, by Margo Glantz, 2023
- The Forgery, by Ave Barrera, 2022, co-translated with Robin Myers
- Nancy, by Bruno Lloret, 2020
- Let's Talk About Your Wall: Mexican Writers Respond to the Immigration Crisis, edited by Carmen Boullosa and Alberto Quintero, 2020 (Translations also by Lisa Dillman, Sophie Hughes, Victor Meadowcroft, Jessica Méndez Sayer, and Samantha Schnee)
- Trout, Belly Up, by Rodrigo Fuentes, 2019
- Suns, by Enrique Winter, 2017 (Translated by Ellen Jones, David McLoghlin and Mary Ellen Stitt)

=== Scholarly ===
- Literature in Motion: Translating Multiculturalism Across the Americas, 2022
