= Bibiana Camacho =

Mexican author, writer and publisher

Bibiana Camacho is a contemporary Mexican author, writer and publisher, best known for her novels: Tu ropa en mi armario (Your clothes in my closet), Tras las huellas de mi olvido (After the traces of my oblivion), La sonámbula (The sleepwalker).

== Personal life ==
Jenni Jiménez, known professionally as Bibiana Camacho, was born in Mexico City in 1974. She considers her grandmother as a fitting literary character. For this reason, she uses her name as a pseudonym. Besides being a writer, Bibiana Camacho is an editor, artisanal notebook maker and former contemporary dancer.

== Career ==
She first studied contemporary dancing but after quitting her dancing studies, got involved in the literary world by studying linguistics. She wrote her first work Tras las huellas de mi olvido in between 2005 and 2006. This book was published in 2007, one year after she wrote it. Other important works include: Tras las Huellas de Mi Olvido, La Sonámbula and Tu Ropa en mi Armario.

Since then she has collaborated with diverse magazines and publications such as Generación, La Tempestad, Replicante and Puro Cuento, and the list goes on. She worked as an intern in the “Fondo Nacional para la cultura y las artes” and she also worked as an editor and translator in “Trusquets editorial”.

Bibiana Camacho's novel, Tras las huellas de mi olvido was rewarded with an honorific mention in the Juan Rulfo Prize in 2007.

== Literary analysis ==
Bibiana Camacho traces a thin line between the reality and fiction in stories in which their characters wander in a supposedly endless monotony. Her stories present symbols through which the physical represents the emotional with a perversive touch and a moral covering. Moreover, she shows a reality with fantastic touches where the human relations are sullied and easily modified. Such an oppression emerged from a moral and powered world

Bibiana presents a reality through a type of fantasy where the human relations are easily modified. She also writes about an oppressed world based in morality and power that would easily trigger into madness with a minute show of change in the human survival.

In Tu ropa en mi armario, Erika must fight with the owners of the building, who she does not know if they are humans. He hears the noises of his house until he hears one he does not recognize. Claudia looks for a place where she can stay the night and asks for asylum to some decadent elders. In “La gotera” (The Leakage) there is an apartment that changes its interior every 24 hours. The stories of Tu ropa en mi armario are an exploration of the intruder, the one that comes to deform our reality. In each story of this book there is a stranger whose intentions are not very clear and, in most of the times are not good ones.

La Sonámbula, the second book of stories of Bibiana Camacho, runs scenarios where every kind of losses and disencounters happen. Their stories delve into the land of the underworld and the fantastic turns shine the everyday at the time that warn the man about the apocalypse well deserved but mysterious.

With Tras las huellas de mi olvido, the conviction of having lost a memory that could have saved the people's lives is explored to its last consequences for Bibiana Camacho. Threatened by a terrible crime, the protagonist decides to travel Mexico City downtown as one who examins its recent memory.

Her stories are included in the anthology Ciudad fantasma & Avisos clasificados, both from 2013.

== Works ==
- Camacho, Bibiana (2010). Tras las Huellas de mi Olvido (1 ed.). Mexico: ALMADIA. ISBN 9786074110500.
- Camacho, Bibiana (2010). TU Ropa en mi Armario (1 ed.). Mexico: ALMADIA. ISBN 9786074120783.
- Camacho, Bibiana (2013). La Sonámbula (1 ed.). Mexico: ALMADIA. ISBN 978-607-411-135-4.
- Gatopardo, Gatopardo (14 September 2016). "10 AUTORES MEXICANOS CONTEMPORÁNEOS". Gatopardo. Travesías Media.
