= Juan García Ponce =

Mexican novelist, writer, essayist and translator

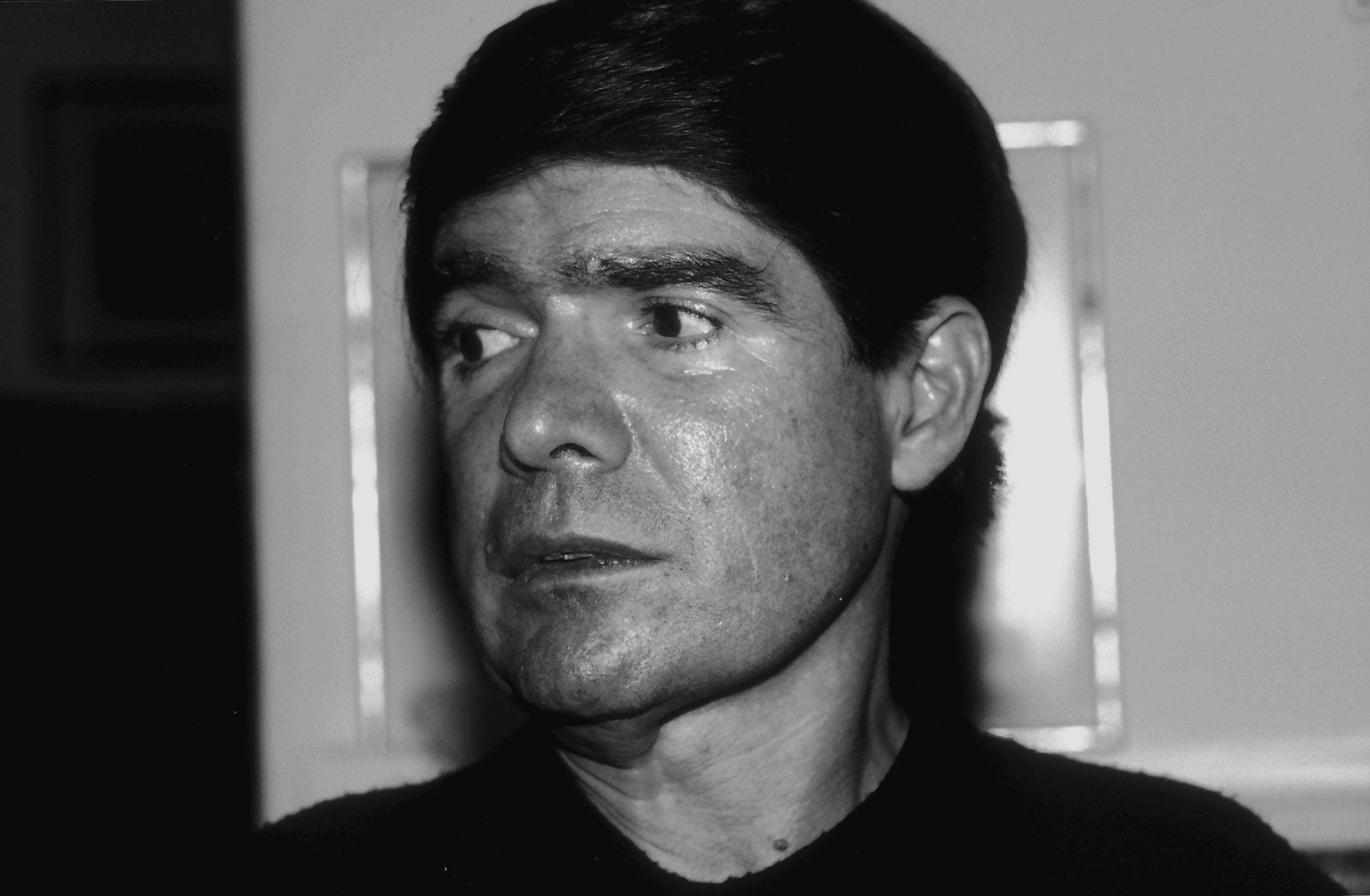
- García Ponce in 1981
- Born: 22 September 1932; Mérida, Yucatán, Mexico
- Died: 27 December 2003 (aged 71); Mexico City, Mexico
- Occupations: Novelist; short-story writer; essayist; translator
- Writing career
- Period: 1954–2012
- Literary movement: Generación de la Ruptura

Juan García Ponce (22 September 1932 – 27 December 2003) was a Mexican novelist, short-story writer, essayist, translator and critic of Mexican art.

== Career ==
García Ponce was born in Mérida, Yucatán, Mexico. His most notable works include La aparición de lo invisible (1968) and Las huellas de la voz (1982). In his novels Figura de paja (1964), La casa en la playa (1966), La presencia lejana (1968), La cabaña (1969), La invitación (1972), El nombre olvidado (1970), El libro (1978), Crónica de la intervención (1982), Inmaculada o los placeres de la Inocencia (1989) he intertwines the erotic with philosophic rigor and the aesthetic, illuminating the secret, demonic side of reality, accepting all of its risks.

He formed an important part of the Generación de Medio Siglo, or the Generación de la Ruptura, along with writers such as Salvador Elizondo, Inés Arredondo, Sergio Pitol and Elena Poniatowska, and artists and painters such as Manuel Felguerez, Vicente Rojo Almazán, José Luis Cuevas, Roger von Gunten, and Fernando García Ponce. He is credited for introducing authors such as Robert Musil, Thomas Mann, Jorge Luis Borges, Pierre Klossowski and Georges Bataille to the Mexican public.

He received various prestigious prizes including the Premio Teatral Ciudad de México (1956), the Xavier Villaurrutia Award (1972) for his novel Encuentros, the Elías Sourasky Prize (1974), the Premio Anagrama de Ensayo (1981), the Premio de la Crítica (1985), the National Prize for Arts and Sciences in Linguistics and Literature (1989), the FIL Literary Award in Romance Languages (then known as the Juan Rulfo Prize for Latin American and Caribbean Literature) (2001) and the Medalla Eligio Ancona.

In 2007 the journal Nexos asked various writers and literary critics to select the greatest Mexican novels of the past 30 years. Juan García Ponce's novel Crónica de la intervención came in third place.

García Ponce died on 27 December 2003 in his house in Mexico City, aged 71. The cause was respiratory failure derived from multiple sclerosis.

== Awards ==
- Xavier Villaurrutia Prize (1972)
- Premio Anagrama de Ensayo (1981)
- Juan Rulfo Prize (2001)

== Bibliography ==
- Rodríguez-Hernández, Raúl: Mexico's Ruins: Juan García Ponce and the Writing of Modernity. State University of New York Press, 2007. ISBN 978-0-7914-6943-9
