= Margo Glantz =

Mexican writer, essayist, critic and academic (born 1930)

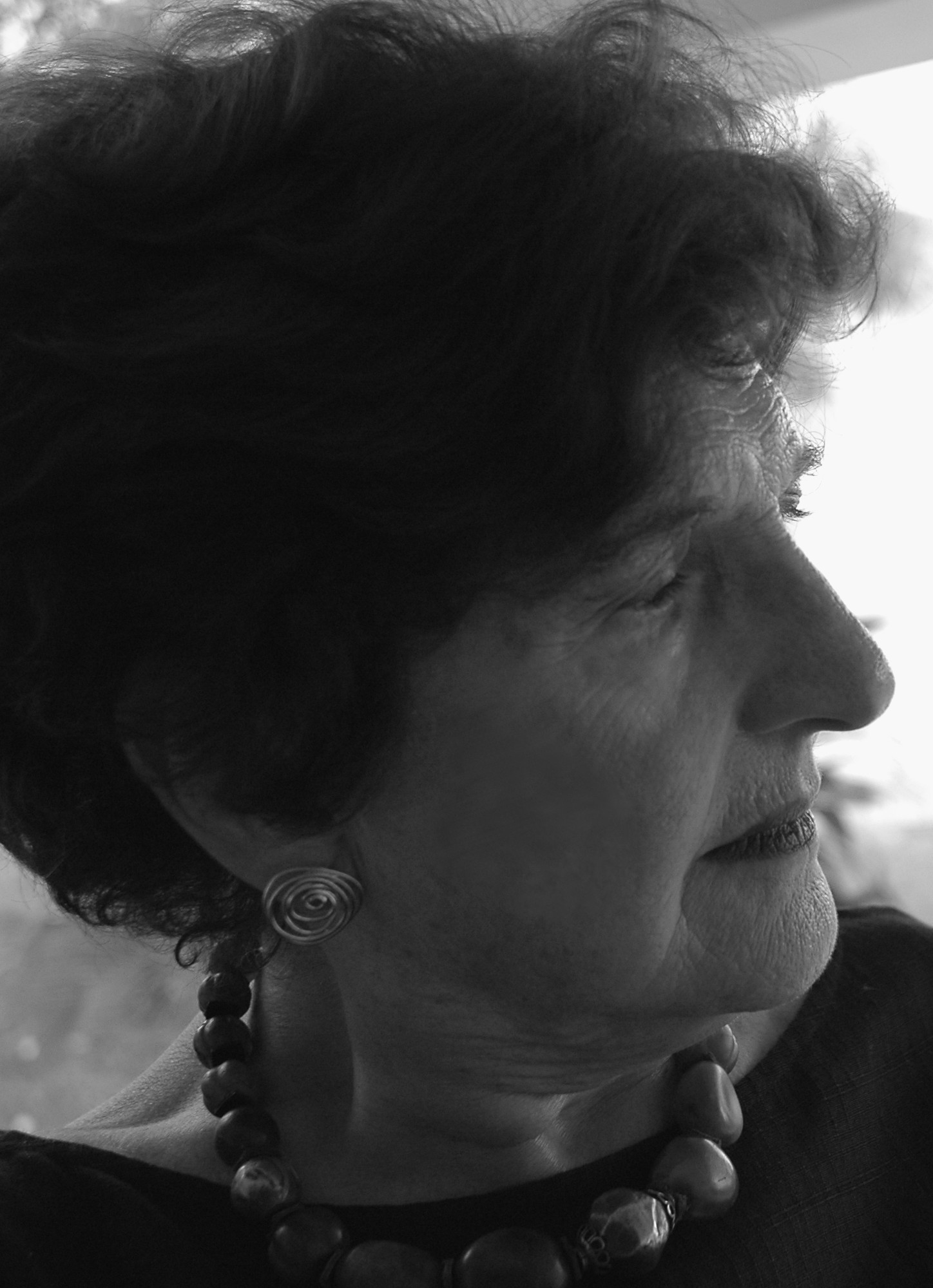
- Born: Margarita Glantz Shapiro; January 28, 1930 (age 96); Mexico City, Mexico
- Occupations: Writer, essayist, literary critic, academic
- Writing career
- Period: 1956–present
- Notable awards: Premio Xavier Villaurrutia; 1984
- Movements: Modernismo, Latin American Boom

Margo Glantz Shapiro (Spanish pronunciation: [ˈmaɾ.ɣo ˈɣlants]; born January 28, 1930) is a Mexican writer, essayist, critic and academic. She has been a member of the Academia Mexicana de la Lengua since 1995. She is a recipient of the FIL Award.

== Biography ==
Margo Glantz's family immigrated to Mexico from Ukraine in the 1920s. Her father, Jacobo Glantz, met her mother, Elizabeth (Lucia) Shapiro in Odessa, where they married. They tried to emigrate to the United States of America, where they had relatives, but were denied entry and had to remain in Mexico. Although they stayed faithful to Jewish traditions, they soon moved in Mexican artistic circles. Her father was a friend of Diego Rivera, and had great interest in the new cultural currents of his new adoptive country.

For many reasons, the family (including four daughters) had to move quite often. As a result, Margo went to several schools. She spent two years in the Secondary School No. 15, a year in the Israelite School of Mexico, and earned her baccalaureate in the National Preparatory School Number 1, the old school of San Ildefonso, where she was strongly influenced by one of her teachers, Agustín Yáñez.

From 1947 to 1953, Margo Glantz studied English and Spanish Literature, as well as Art history, majoring in Theater History at the National Autonomous University of Mexico. Here she had many outstanding professors, among them writers and philosophers such as Alfonso Reyes, Julio Torri, Rodolfo Usigli, Samuel Ramos and Leopoldo Zea. In 1953 she left for Europe, where she earned her doctorate in Hispanic Literature at the Sorbonne. It was there where she presented her thesis on "The French Exoticism in Mexico (From 1847 to 1867)".

On her return to Mexico, she became a teacher in the Department of Theater History in the Faculty of Philosophy and Literature. In 1959 her first daughter, Alina, was born. After a journey to Cuba in 1961, she started to teach a course in Mexican Literature at the National Preparatory School Number 1, as well as courses in Universal Literature and of Mexican Literature at the Preparatory No. 5. In the same year she started to teach at the University Center of Theatre, at the School of Theater and Fine arts of the UNAM, and at the Center of Classic Theater of the "Casa del Lago" (Lake House). During these years she published several essays and theater reviews in a variety of cultural magazines and handouts.

In 1966 she became a permanent, full-time Professor at the Faculty of Philosophy and Literature, specifically in Hispanic Literature and Comparative Literature. She founded and directed the university magazine Punto de Partida. She was also the director of the Israel-Mexico Cultural Institute until 1969. In 1971 her daughter Renata was born. In the same year she set out for the United States of America, where she taught classes at Montclair State College in New Jersey. She published Onda y escritura en Mexico (Wave and writing in Mexico), Jovenes de 20 a 33, which gave name to a wave of emerging literature in the 60s, the "Onda" (the Wave).

She returned to Mexico in 1974, where she rejoined the Faculty of Philosophy and Literature, teaching courses in Latin American and Mexican Literature. In 1978 she edited her first fictional book, Las mil y una calorias, novela dietética (A Thousand and One Calories: A Dietetic Novel), which inspired a great number of other books in the field of creation and criticism (see bibliography). In 1981 she dedicated her autobiographic work, Las genealogias, to her father, who died one year later.

In 1983 she was named Director of Literature at the Instituto Nacional de Bellas Artes (INBA), where she promoted and directed a number of publications. A year later she obtained the "Premio Xavier Villaurrutia" (The Xavier Villaurrutia Award) for her work Síndrome de Naufragios. In 1986 she set out for England, where she worked as a Cultural Associate in the Mexican Embassy in London, until 1988.

That same year she returned to Mexico, and since has led courses at the Faculty of Philosophy and in numerous universities overseas. In 1989 she was named Member of the National System of Researchers. In 1991 she obtained the National University Prize and again in 1994 she was given the title of Emeritus Professor, both by UNAM. Likewise, Princeton University has since awarded her the nomination of Honorary Emeritus Creator of the National System of Creators, as well as the Council of Humanities Fellow.

In 1995 she was elected to be a member of the Academia Mexicana de la Lengua (Mexican Language Academy). In 2004 she was awarded the "Premio Nacional, campo I, Área de Lingüística y Literatura" (National Prize, field 1, Are of Linguistics and Literature). That same year she was granted the distinction of Emeritus Investigator of the Sistema Nacional de Investigadores (National System of Investigators). A year later, in 2005, she was honored with the Doctorate Honoris Causa by the Universidad Autónoma Metropolitana and with her nomination as an Emeritus Honorary Creator of the National System of Creators. In 2006 a web page was published about her, which was coordinated by Beatriz Aracil Varón, in the Virtual Library Miguel de Cervantes Saavedra, of Alicante University.

== Prizes and scholarships ==
- Premio Magda Donato, 1982
- Premio Xavier Villaurrutia, 1984
- Premio Universidad Nacional, 1991
- Rockefeller Scholarship, 1996
- Guggenheim Scholarship, 1998
- Finalist of the "XX Premio Herralde de Novela 2002" for El rastro
- Premio Sor Juana Inés de la Cruz, 2003
- Premio Nacional de Ciencias y Artes, 2004
- Doctorate Honoris Causa by the Universidad Autónoma Metropolitana, 2005
- Juan Rulfo Prize, now known as FIL Award (Spanish: Premio FIL de Literatura)) 2010
- Doctorate honoris causa by the Universidad Autónoma de Nuevo León, 2010
- Doctorate honoris causa by the Universidad Nacional Autónoma de México, 2011
- Manuel Rojas Ibero-American Narrative Award, 2015

== Works ==
=== Novels, short stories and autobiographies ===
- Las mil y una calorías, México, Premiá, 1978.
- Doscientas ballenas azules, México, La máquina de escribir, 1979; second edition: Doscientas ballenas azules y cuatro caballos..., México, UNAM, 1981.
- No pronunciarás, México, Premiá, 1980.
- Las genealogías, México, Martín Casillas, 1981 (Premio Magda Donato 1982); reediciones: México, Alfaguara, 1997 y Valencia (España), Pre-Textos, 2006. English translation: The Family Tree: An Illustrated Novel; translated by Susan Bassnett. London: Serpent's Tail, 1991.
- Material de lectura: Margo Glantz. Fragments from Las genealogías, No pronunciarás, Síndrome de Naufragios, México, UNAM, 1990. Reedición, UNAM, 2006.
- Apariciones, México, Alfaguara, 1996. Second Edition. México, Alfaguara-Universidad del Claustro de Sor Juana, 2002.
- Zona de derrumbe, Rosario, Beatriz Viterbo, 2001. Second edition, 2006.
- El rastro, Barcelona, Anagrama, 2002. Premio Sor Juana Inés de la Cruz 2004. English translations: The Wake, translated by Andrew Hurley, Willimantic: Curbstone Press, 2005. The Remains, translated by Ellen Jones. Edinburgh: Charco Press, 2023.
- Animal de dos semblantes, Santiago de Chile, LOM Ediciones, 2004.
- Historia de una mujer que caminó por la vida con zapatos de diseñador, Barcelona, Anagrama, 2005.
- Saña, Lima, Sarita Cartonera, 2006.

=== Essays and criticisms ===
- Viajes en México. Crónicas extranjeras, México, Secretaría de Obras Públicas, 1964.
- Tennessee Williams y el teatro norteamericano, México, UNAM, 1964.
- Narrativa Joven de México, (coord. y prol.), México, Siglo XXI, 1969.
- Onda y escritura, jóvenes de 20 a 33, (prol. y ant.), México, Siglo XXI, 1971.
- La aventura del Conde de Rousset Boulbon, México, SepSetenta, 1972.
- Doscientas ballenas azules, México, La Máquina de Escribir, 1979.
- No pronunciarás, México, Premià, 1980.
- Repeticiones. Ensayos sobre literatura mexicana, México, Universidad Veracruzana (UV), 1980.
- Intervención y pretexto. Ensayos de literatura comparada e iberoamericana, México, UNAM, 1981.
- El día de tu boda, México, Secretaría de Educación Pública (SEP) / Martín Casillas, 1982.
- La lengua en la mano, México, Premià, 1984.
- De la amorosa inclinación de enredarse en cabellos, México, Océano, 1984.
- Erosiones, México, Universidad Autónoma del Estado de México (UAEM), 1984.
- Síndrome de naufragios, México, Joaquín Mortiz, 1984 (Premio Xavier Villaurrutia 1984).
- Bordando sobre la escritura y la cocina, (coord. y presentation), México, INBA-SEP (Colección Estanquillo Literario), 1984.
- Cuentistas mexicanos del siglo XX. Vol. I: Fin del viejo régimen, (compilator), México, SEP, INBA, DDF, 1984.
- Guía de Forasteros, estanquillo literario (paper of history on Mexican literature), vols. I, II, III, IV (editor), México, Instituto Nacional de Bellas Artes, 1985.
- Borrones y borradores. Ensayos sobre literatura colonial, UNAM / El Equilibrista, México, 1992; reedition with the title: La desnudez como naufragio: borrones y borradores, Madrid Iberoamericana, 2005.
- Alvar Núñez Cabeza de Vaca, Notas y documentos, México, Conaculta, 1993.
- Esguince de cintura: ensayos sobre narrativa mexicana del siglo XX, México, Consejo Nacional para la Cultura y las Artes, 1994.
- La Malinche, sus padres y sus hijos, México, UNAM, 1994; reedition: México, Taurus, 2001.
- Obra selecta de Sor Juana Inés de la Cruz (selection y prologue by Margo Glantz and chronology and bibliography by María Dolores Bravo Arriaga), Caracas, Biblioteca Ayacucho, 1994.
- Sor Juana Inés de la Cruz, ¿hagiografía o autobiografía?, México, Grijalbo, Universidad Nacional Autónoma, 1995.
- Huérfanos y bandidos: “Los bandidos de Río Frío”, , México, Instituto Mexiquense de Cultura, 1995.
- Sor Juana Inés de la Cruz: saberes y placeres, Toluca, Instituto Mexiquense de Cultura, 1996.
- José Gorostiza y Juan Rulfo (reception speech in the Academia Mexicana de la Lengua), México, Condumex, 1996.
- Del fistol a la linterna, Homenaje a José Tomás de Cuéllar y Manuel Payno en el centenario de su muerte, 1994, (coord.), México, UNAM, 1997.
- Sor Juana y sus contemporáneos , (coord.), Memoirs of the Congress on Sor Juana and her contemporaneous (1995), México, UNAM-Condumex, 1998.
- Sor Juana: La comparación y la hipérbole, Mexico, Consejo Nacional de la Cultura y las Artes, 2000.
- Obras reunidas: Tomo I: La literatura colonial, Fondo de Cultura Económica, México, 2006.
- Cuerpo contra cuerpo, Sexto Piso, 2020 (Editor, Ana Negri)
