= Samuel G. Armistead =

American linguist (1927–2013)

- Born: Samuel Gordon Armistead; August 21, 1927; Philadelphia, Pennsylvania, U.S.
- Died: August 7, 2013 (aged 85); Davis, California, U.S.
- Occupations: ethnographer, linguist, folklorist, Historian, Professor and critic of literature
- Notable work: El romancero judeo-español en el Archivo Menéndez Pidal, Folk Literature of the Sephardic Jews, Bibliografías del romancero oral, La tradición épica de las "Mocedades de Rodrigo"

Samuel Gordon Armistead (August 21, 1927 – August 7, 2013) was an American ethnographer, linguist, folklorist, historian, literary critic and professor of Spanish. He is considered one of the most notable Hispanist scholars of the second half of the 20th and early 21st century.

== Biography ==
Samuel Gordon Armistead was born in Philadelphia, Pennsylvania, and was raised in Chestnut Hill, Philadelphia. His mother, Elizabeth Tucker Russell Armistead, was a historian and student of foreign languages; and he had, at least, one brother, Harry Armistead. He came from a family of lawyers and bankers. As a teenager, Armistead suffered an accident with explosives that caused the loss of an eye and some fingers.

He graduated from Penn Charter School in 1945. Afterwards he spent six months in the U.S. Merchant Marine and traveled to France and the Caribbean. Guided by his desire to learn Spanish (the language having attracted him since his adolescence), he lived in Cuba, where he had relatives and friends, for several seasons, studying and perfecting his Spanish. His stay in Cuba also whetted his appetite for Hispanic literature and culture.

Beginning in the fall of 1945 he studied Spanish literature at Princeton University, receiving his doctorate in Spanish literature and Romance languages in 1955 with a thesis entitled "La gesta de las mocedades de Rodrigo: Reflections of a Lost Epic Poem in the Cronica de los Reyes de Castilla and the Cronica General de 1344", written under the direction of Américo Castro.

By this time he had begun his teaching career at Princeton (1953–1955). Ultimately he became a professor at the University of California, Los Angeles (UCLA) (1956 - 1967), Purdue University in Indiana, (1967 - 1968), the University of Pennsylvania (1968 - 1982), and the University of California, Davis, where he taught from 1982 until his death in 2013.

In 1957, Armistead initiated a collaborative project to collect, edit and study the massive body of Hispanic oral literature from a comparative literature perspective. He worked closely with another eminent Hispanist scholar, Joseph H. Silverman (1924–1989), and the musicologist Israel J. Katz (born 1930), with both of whom he developed an extensive body of work that focused primarily on the oral literature of the Sephardic communities of Morocco and the East. He also worked closely with Hispanist Manuel da Costa Fontes on studies focusing especially on the oral traditions of Portugal and Brazil.

Beginning in 1975, Sam Armistead conducted a field study on the Hispanic linguistics of Spanish colonial communities in Louisiana, communities that have existed in that state since the 18th century and still do. The book he published from that study is The Spanish Tradition in Louisiana (1992). More recently he was engaged in researching additional aspects of Louisiana Spanish and its oral literature.

Between 2000 and 2002 he was co-chair of the Departments of Spanish and Classics at the University of California, Davis. In 2003 he published a six-volume collection of Portuguese traditional romances from the Azores Islands, and he was at work on subsequent volumes. at the time of his death. He retired in 2010 from UC Davis, as professor emeritus.

Armistead died on August 7, 2013, at 85 years old, in Davis, California, due to complications from surgery.

== Career ==
His studies were especially focused on medieval Spanish language and literature, Hispanic folk literature, comparative literature and folklore. He studied ballads of Spain and North Africa.

He excelled also in his studies of minority and archaic (but still existing) languages, such as the Spanish language of the Isleño communities in Louisiana and, especially, the Sephardic Jews' language, Ladino.

Armistead was author of a multi-volume series concerning the traditional literature of the Sephardic Jews and is author, co-author, editor, or co-editor of over twenty books and several hundred articles on medieval Spanish literature, modern Hispanic oral literature, and comparative literature.

His research fields that have had special impact include early poetry, medieval history, Hispanic dialectology, the Spanish epic and Romance, old and traditional. He conducted numerous field surveys on the language and oral literature of the Sephardic communities of Morocco, the Middle East, rural communities in Portugal, Spain and Israel, and several sites in the United States.

In addition, he performed pioneering studies on various genres of Hispanic oral tradition, such as the kharjas, riddles, the paremeología and folktales.

== Personal life ==
Armistead spent his last years in Northern California. He was married for some time to Maria del Pilar Valcarcel-Calderon. After his divorce, he married Annie Laurie Meltzoff, a yoga instructor.

== Works ==
His books, written either in English or in Spanish, are:

- Judeo-Spanish Ballads from Bosnia (with Joseph H. Silverman), 1971
- Folk Literature of the Sephardic Jews, Vol. I: The Judeo-Spanish Ballad Chapbooks of Yacob Abraham Yona (with Joseph H. Silverman), May 1, 1972
- Romances judeo-españoles de Tánger (Judeo-Spanish Romances of Tangier, with Joseph H. Silverman), 1977
- El romancero judeo-español en el Archivo Menéndez Pidal (The Judeo-Spanish ballads in the Archive Menéndez Pidal, with several authors) (1978)
- Tres calas en el romancero (Three bays in the ballads, with Joseph H. Silverman), 1979
- Hispania Judaica: Studies on the history, language, and literature of the Jews in the Hispanic world (with Joseph H. Silverman and Josep M. Sola-Solé), 1980
- Judeo-Spanish Ballads from New York (with Joseph H. Silverman), 1981
- Seis romancerillos de cordel sefardíes (Six ballads of Sephardic string, with Silverman and Iacob M. Hassán), 1981
- En torno al romancero sefardí: hispanismo y balcanismo de la tradición judeo-española (Around the Sephardic ballads: Hispanism and Balkanism of the Judeo-Spanish (with Joseph H. Silverman), 1982.
- Musica Y Poesia Popular De España Y Portugal (Music and Popular Poetry of Spain and Portugal, reedition of book written by Kurt Schindler in 1941), 1991
- Bibliografías del romancero oral 1 (Bibliographies of oral ballads 1), 1992
- The Spanish Tradition in Louisiana: I, Isleño Folkliterature (with musical transcriptions by Israel J. Katz), 1992
- Folk Literature of the Sephardic Jews (three volumes, with Joseph H. Silverman and Israel J. Katz ), 1972 - 1994.
- La tradición épica de las "Mocedades de Rodrigo" (The epic tradition of "Rodrigo Mocedades"), 1999

== Honors and awards ==
- Medieval Academy of America (Fellow, 1973)
- Doctor of Humane Letters (Georgetown University, 1990)
- American Folklore Society (Fellow, 1991)
- National Jewish Book Award in the Jewish Folklore and Anthropology category for Folk Literature of the Sephardic Jews with Joseph H. Silverman (1994)
- Academia Norteamericana de la Lengua Española (corresponding member, 1998)
- U.C. Davis Faculty Research Lecturer (1998–1999)
- Premio Internacional ("International Award") Elio Antonio de Nebrija, received in the University of Salamanca (1999).
- Distinguished Lecturer in Medieval Studies (Arizona State University, Tempe, 2000)
- U.C. Davis Distinguished Professor (2003)
- Elected foreign Corresponding Member
- Named a corresponding member of the Real Academia Española (June 2009)
- Awarded Doctor honoris causa, Universidad de Alcalá (Madrid, December 2010).

== See also ==
- Sephardic Jews (Judaeo-Spanish)
- Isleños in Louisiana
