= Fernando García Ponce =

Mexican architect and abstract artist (1933-1987)

Fernando Garcia Ponce
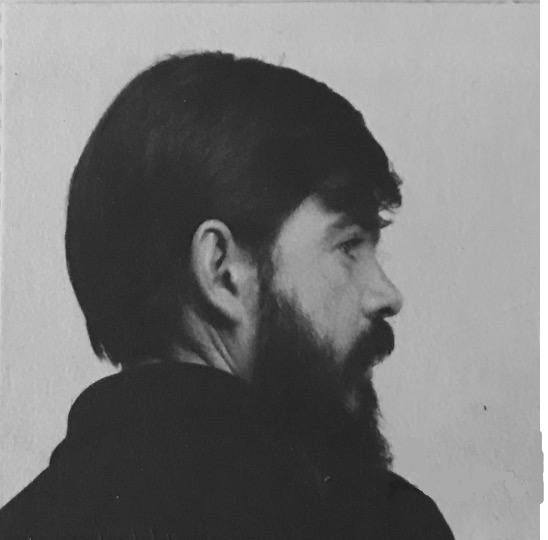
- Born: August 25, 1933; Mérida, Yucatán
- Died: July 11, 1987 (aged 53); Mexico City
- Education: University of Mexico
- Movement: Generación de la Ruptura
- Spouse: Denise Brosseau (m. 1972; died 1986)
- Relatives: Juan García Ponce (brother)

Fernando Garcia Ponce (1933–1987) was a Mexican architect and abstract artist who belonged to the Generación de la Ruptura. García Ponce is best known for his abstract paintings and collages, most of which utilize structured and geometric forms rather than organic shapes.

== Life ==
García Ponce was born in Mérida, Yucatán, Mexico on August 25, 1933, to Juan García Rodes, immigrant from Spain, and María "Monina" Ponce G. Cantón, a member of the so-called "casta divina" of Yucatán. At the age of 11, García Ponce's family moved to Mexico City. In 1952, García Ponce enrolled at the National Autonomous University of Mexico to study architecture.

In 1967, García Ponce met the French Canadian actress Denise Brosseau, who had previously been married to Alejandro Jodorowsky. Brosseau and García Ponce married and had one child, Esteban García Brosseau.

On July 11, 1987, García Ponce died of a heart attack in Coyoacán, Mexico City; García Ponce was 53 at the time.

His elder brother, Juan Garcia Ponce, was a well known author and has published works about his brother's art and life.

== Works ==
Garcia Ponce is part of a generation of artist that began to seek new creative option after 1945. In Mexico this desire to create a new tradition was particularly difficult in Mexico, because of the omnipresence of the "three great" muralist: Siqueiros, Rivera and Orozco. Garcia Ponce and other painters of his generation felt the necessity to establish the independence of painting towards any type of social or political program.

After traveling to Paris in his youth Garcia Ponce assimilated the philosophical background that characterized Informalism in France and Abstract Expressionism in the U.S. of which he appreciated the freedom. Nonetheless, his formation as an architect undeniably influenced his painting in which geometry and structure are essential components even if treated lyrically.

Garcia Ponce first teacher was the Spanish painter Enrique Climent who took him as his only student. Some of his works are:

- Self-portrait (1951)
- Natural Death (1959)
- Painting A-63 (1963)
- Bottling Peninsula, ca (1966)
- Relief and Space (1970)
- Homage to Picasso (1976)
- Glory and Death (1980)
- Horizontal Composition with Red Point (1986)
