= News from the Empire =

Novel by Mexican author Fernando del Paso

- First English edition
- Author: Fernando del Paso
- Original title: Noticias del imperio
- Translator: Alfonso González and Stella T. Clark
- Language: Spanish
- Genre: Historical fiction
- Publisher: Dalkey Archive Press (English)
- Publication date: 1987
- Publication place: Mexico
- English publication date: 2009
- Pages: 704
- ISBN: 978-1564785336
- LC Class: PQ7298.26.A76N6813

News from the Empire (Spanish: Noticias del Imperio) is a 1987 historical novel by Mexican writer Fernando del Paso about the Second French Intervention in Mexico and the Second Mexican Empire, with Emperor Maximilian I of Mexico and his wife Carlota of Mexico.

In 2007, a jury of writers gathered by Nexos magazine chose News from the Empire as the best Mexican novel of the previoius 30 years.

== Background ==
The novel was written with a Guggenheim Fellowship stipend. Del Paso worked on it for ten years, after writing his second novel, Palinuro of Mexico (1976). Two of those ten years were spent in extensive historical research. According to Del Paso, he chose to give strength to Carlota's first-person narrative because he considered her to be a strong woman and a decision maker. Del Paso read two existing works on the subject that he considered insufficient, Juárez and Maximilian (1925) by Franz Werfel, and Corona de sombra (1943) by Rodolfo Usigli. Del Paso has said of Maximilian and Carlota:

Maximilian was an escapist, when he would go to Cuernavaca to hunt butterflies and lizards or go with his mistress Concepción Sedano (whom people said he had there), Carlota was left to rule and when she was regent, things were done, legislations were passed, and she was the only one who could do it.

It was first published in 1987 by Editorial Diana in its collection "Diana Literaria".

== Plot ==
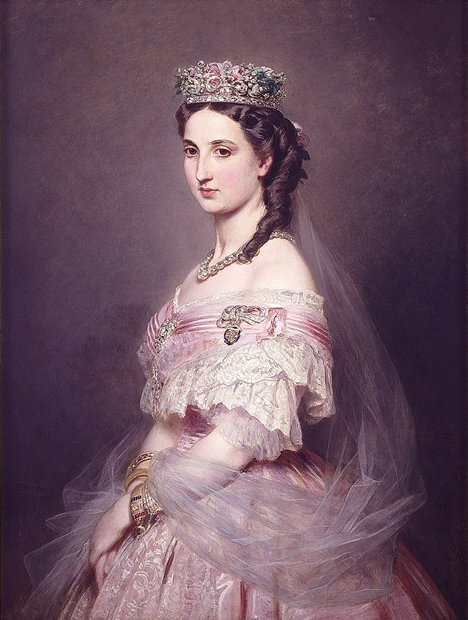
Carlota of Mexico by Franz Xaver Winterhalter, portrait used on the book cover of various editions.

The novel is written in two sequences, the first is a monologue by Empress Carlota while she was locked up in the Bouchout Castle in Belgium, sixty years after Maximilian was executed at the Cerro de las Campanas, Querétaro, on 19 June 1867, as she fell into madness after his death. In this monologue, Carlota explains the story of her love for Maximilian, as well as the times of the Second Mexican Empire and European royalty.

At the same time, Del Paso resorts to various genres and techniques to give voice to the different parties involved in the conflict, among them epistles between members of the royalty, historical chronicles, which have as settings the Miramare Castle, Mexico, France, Germany, Vienna, among other places, and characters such as Charles de Lorencez, François Achille Bazaine, Élie-Frédéric Forey, Miguel Miramón, Tomás Mejía, Benito Juárez, Porfirio Díaz, Mariano Escobedo, Gaspar Sánchez Ochoa, Franz Joseph I of Austria, Napoleon III, among other historical participants in the conflict.

Both sequences take turns, changing the name of the chapter of the narrative sequence while all of Carlota's monologues are always titled "Bouchout Castle 1927".

== Critical reception ==
The novel was well received, generating an "almost instantaneous" success. In ten years the work had to be reprinted twenty times, and in 2012 it was published in the collection "Letras Mexicanas" by the Fondo de Cultura Económica. It was published in Spain and Argentina and translated into English, French, Italian, and German. American literary critic Seymour Menton praised it in his work La nueva novela histórica de América Latina, 1979–1992, calling it "the instant canonization of a Bakhtinian symphony". Publishers Weekly said that the novel was "operatic and beautiful" and "a Mexican War and Peace".
