= Joseph H. Silverman (Hispanist) =

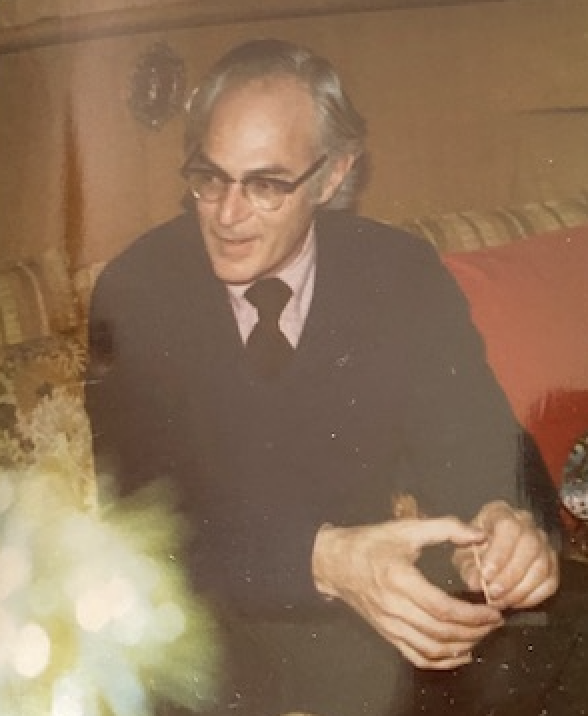
Joseph H Silverman, taken in Madrid, Spain, in December of 1977

Joseph H. Silverman (October 15, 1924 – March 23, 1989) was an American Hispanist scholar and professor of Spanish literature at the University of Southern California and the University of California at Los Angeles and Santa Cruz.

Silverman specialized in Spanish Golden Age literature, especially the comedia and the picaresque novel, and the role of converts from Judaism in Spanish culture. He collaborated with fellow Hispanist scholars Samuel G. Armistead and Israel J. Katz in the study of the literature of the Sephardic Jews. While at UC Santa Cruz, Silverman served as provost of the Adlai E. Stevenson College from 1974 to 1981. Silverman published nearly 300 books, articles, and reviews throughout his career.

== Biography ==
Joseph H. Silverman was born in Bronx, New York, on October 15, 1924. He died of stomach cancer in Santa Cruz, California, on March 23, 1989.

== Education ==
Silverman attended James Madison High School in Brooklyn, New York, before graduating Phi Beta Kappa from City College of New York in 1946. On an exchange scholarship during this time he studied at the University of Mexico. He earned his M.A. and Ph.D. at the University of Southern California in 1950 and 1955, respectively. He spent the summer of 1949 studying at the University of Madrid.

== Career ==
Silverman was a student and friend of scholar Américo Castro. Throughout his career, Silverman received many honors, including membership in the Royal Spanish Academy (Real Academia Española). Silverman is celebrated by students and colleagues as extraordinary in his engaging approach to teaching in addition to his scholarship. Silverman taught at USC from 1952 to 1954, at UCLA from 1954 to 1968, and then spent the rest of his career at UCSC. Throughout this time, he held visiting professorships at the University of Arizona's Guadalajara summer school, Instituto de Cooperación Iberoamericana in Madrid, UC Berkeley, and an advanced course in Spanish philology in Málaga, Spain.

== Personal life ==
Silverman was married to June Audrey Chávez (1927-2003) with whom he had three daughters, Sari Chávez Silverman, Susana Chávez Silverman, and Laura Silverman. June taught French, Spanish and English as a second language at the high school, college, university and adult education levels. After her husband's death, she established the Joseph H. Silverman Fellowship: a dissertation fellowship for doctoral candidates in Spanish Renaissance literature.

== Selected works ==
- Diez romances hispánicos en un manuscrito sefardí de la isla de Rodas, with Samuel Armistead, 1962
- The Judeo-Spanish ballad chapbooks of Yacob Abraham Yoná, 1971
- Judeo-Spanish Ballads from Bosnia, with Samuel Armistead, 1971
- Romances judeo-españoles de Tánger, with Samuel Armistead, 1977
- Tres calas en el romancero, with Samuel Armistead, 1979
- Hispania Judaica: Studies on the history, language and literature of the Jews in the Hispanic world, with Samuel Armistead and Josep M. Sola-Solé, 1980
- Judeo-Spanish Ballads from New York, with Samuel Armistead, 1981
- Seis romancerillos de cordel sefardíes, with Samuel Armistead and Iacob M. Hassán, 1981
- En torno al romancero sefardí: hispanismo y balcanismo de la tradición judeo-española, with Samuel Armistead, 1982
- Folk Literature of the Sephardic Jews, with Samuel Armistead and Israel J. Katz 1972-1994 (three volumes)

== Select Awards and Honors ==
- National Endowment for the Humanities Senior Fellowship (1971–72)
- University of Chicago Folklore First Prize (1973)
- Guggenheim Foundation Fellowship (1977–78)

== See also ==
Samuel G. Armistead
