= Marisol Escobar =

Venezuelan American sculptor (1930–2016)

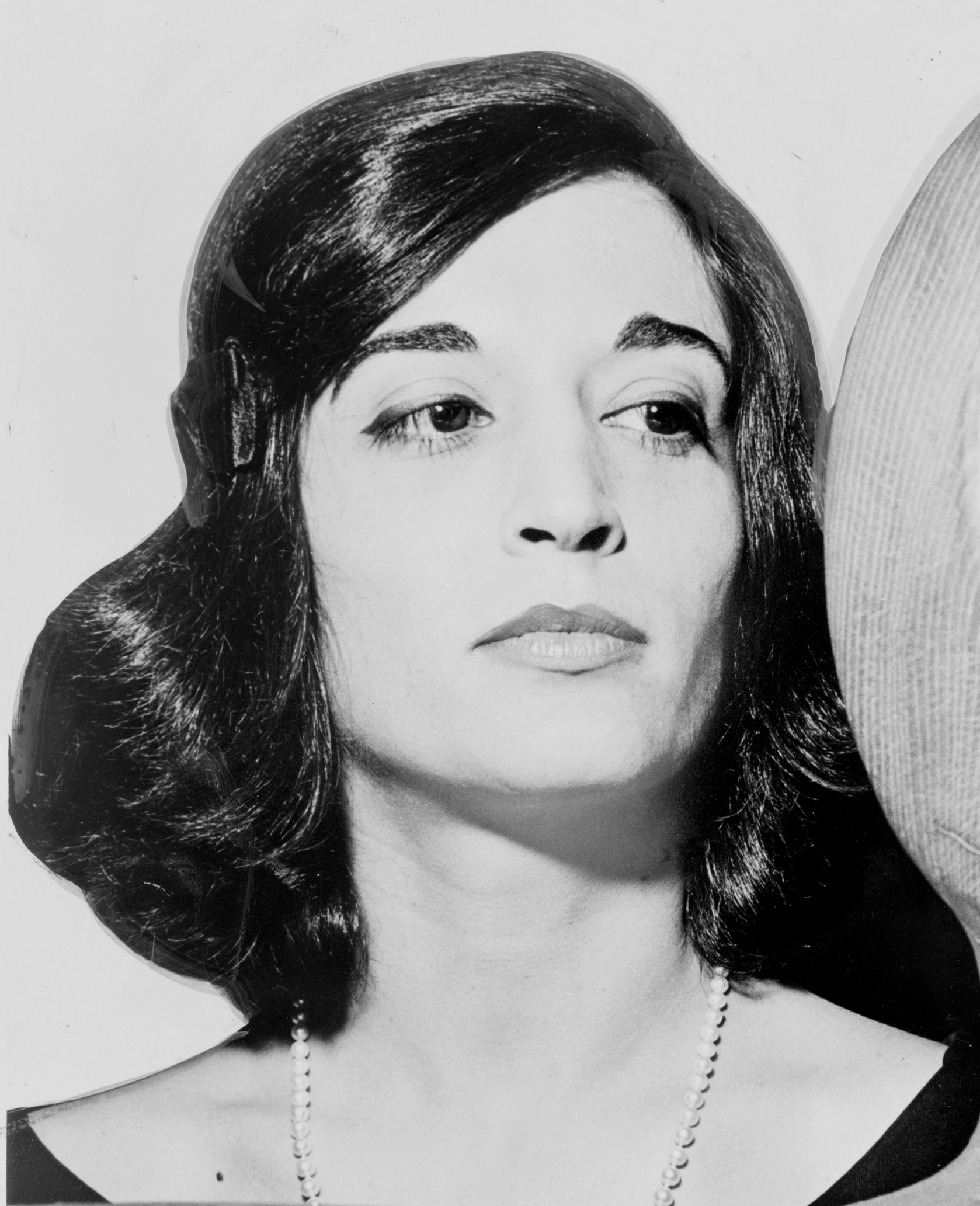
- Marisol Escobar (1963)
- Born: Maria Sol Escobar; May 22, 1930; Paris, France
- Died: April 30, 2016 (aged 85); New York City, United States
- Education: Jepson Art Institute; École des Beaux-Arts; Art Students League of New York; Hans Hofmann School
- Known for: Sculpture; Assemblage
- Notable work: Women and Dog; The Generals; The Last Supper; The Family; Father Damien
- Movement: Pop Art, New Realism
- Awards: 1997 Premio Gabriela Mistral, from Organization of American States; American Academy of Arts and Letters (1978)
- Memorials: A gallery is dedicated in Marisol's honor at the Buffalo AKG Art Museum

Marisol Escobar (May 22, 1930 – April 30, 2016), otherwise known simply as Marisol, was a Venezuelan-American sculptor. She was born in Paris to Venezuelan parents and lived and worked in New York City. She held the US, Venezuelan and French nationality and became world-famous in the mid-1960s, but lapsed into relative obscurity within a decade. She continued to create her artworks and returned to the limelight in the early 21st century, capped by a 2014 major retrospective show organized by the Memphis Brooks Museum of Art. The largest retrospective of Marisol's artwork, Marisol: A Retrospective has been organized by the Buffalo AKG Art Museum and curated by Cathleen Chaffee for these museums: the Montreal Museum of Fine Arts (October 7, 2023 – January 21, 2024), the Toledo Museum of Art (March–June 2024), the Buffalo AKG Art Museum (July 12, 2024 - January 6, 2025), and the Dallas Museum of Art (February 23–July 6, 2025). Although it was supplemented by loans from international museums and private collections, the exhibition drew largely on artwork and archival material Marisol left to the Buffalo AKG Art Museum as a bequest upon her death.

== Early life and education ==
María Sol Escobar was born on May 22, 1930, to Venezuelan parents in Paris, France. She was preceded by an elder brother, Gustavo. Her father, Gustavo Hernández Escobar, and her mother, Josefina, were from wealthy families and lived off assets from oil and real estate investments. This wealth led them to travel frequently around Europe, the United States and Venezuela. At some point in time, María Sol began to be known as Marisol, a common Spanish nickname.

Josefina Escobar committed suicide in 1941, when Marisol was eleven. The tragedy, followed by her father shipping Marisol off to boarding school in Long Island, New York, for one year, affected her very deeply. Marisol decided to not speak again after her mother's death, although she made exceptions for answering questions in school or other requirements; she did not regularly speak out loud until her early twenties.

Although Marisol was deeply traumatized, this did not affect her artistic talents. She had begun drawing early in life, with her parents encouraging her talent by taking her to museums. She frequently earned artistic prizes in school before settling in Los Angeles in 1946. Marisol additionally displayed talent in embroidery, spending at least three years embroidering the corner of a tablecloth (including going to school on Sundays in order to work).

As a child, Marisol was very religious. During her teen years, she coped with the trauma of her mother's death by walking on her knees until they bled, keeping silent for long periods, and tying ropes tightly around her waist.

After Josefina's death and Marisol's exit from the Long Island boarding school, the family traveled between New York and Caracas, Venezuela. In 1946, when Marisol was 16, the family relocated to Los Angeles; she was enrolled at the Marymount High School in Los Angeles. She did not fit in at this institution and was expelled; she transferred to the Westlake School for Girls in 1948.

Marisol began her formal arts education in 1946 with night classes at the Otis Art Institute and the Jepson Art Institute in Los Angeles, where she studied under Howard Warshaw and Rico Lebrun.

Marisol studied art at the Paris École des Beaux-Arts in 1949. She then returned to the United States and, in 1950, moved to New York to begin her studies there. She took classes at the Art Students League of New York, at the New School for Social Research, and she was a student of artist Hans Hofmann at his schools in New York and Provincetown.

== Early career ==
The Large Family Group (1957), National Museum of Women in the Arts, Washington, D.C.

After experimenting with terracotta, bronze, and wood sculptures inspired by Pre-Columbian sculpture and American Folk Art in the 1950s, Marisol left New York for Rome in 1957, where she stayed for more than a year. On her return, Marisol quickly became associated with the pop art movement as it emerged in the 1960s, enhancing her recognition and popularity. By 1961-62 she was concentrating her work on three-dimensional portraits and representations of society types, using inspiration "found in photographs or gleaned from personal memories". Marisol took inspiration from found objects, such as a piece of wood that became her Mona Lisa sculpture, and an old couch that became The Visit.

She became a friend of Andy Warhol in the early 1960s; she made a sculptural portrait of him, and he invited her to appear in several of his early films, including The Kiss (1963) and 13 Most Beautiful Girls (1964).

== Artistic practice ==
During the Postwar period, there was a return of traditional values that reinstated social roles, conforming race and gender within the public sphere. According to Holly Williams, Marisol's sculptural works toyed with the prescribed social roles and restraints faced by women during this period through her depiction of the complexities of femininity as a perceived truth. Marisol's practice demonstrated a dynamic combination of folk art, dada, and surrealism – ultimately illustrating a keen psychological insight on contemporary life.

By displaying the essential aspects of femininity within an assemblage of makeshift construction, Marisol was able to comment on the social construct of "woman" as an unstable entity. Using an assemblage of plaster casts, wooden blocks, woodcarving, drawings, photography, paint, and pieces of contemporary clothing, Marisol effectively recognized their physical discontinuities. Through a crude combination of materials, Marisol symbolized the artist's denial of any consistent existence of "essential" femininity. "Femininity" being defined as a fabricated identity made through representational parts. An identity which was most commonly determined by the male onlooker, as either mother, seductress, or partner.

Using a feminist technique, Marisol disrupted the patriarchal values of society through forms of mimicry. She imitated and exaggerated the behaviors of the popular public. Through a parody of women, fashion, and television, she attempted to ignite social change.

== Mimicry as a feminist tactic ==
Marisol mimicked the role of femininity in her sculptural grouping Women and Dog, which she produced between 1963 and 1964. This work, among others, represented a satiric critical response on the guises of fabricated femininity by deliberately assuming the role of "femininity" in order to change its oppressive nature. Three women, a little girl, and a dog are presented as objects on display, relishing their social status with confidence under the gaze of the public. The women are sculpted as calculated and "civilized" in their manner, monitoring both themselves and those around them. Two of women even have several cast faces, surveying the scene and following the subject's trajectory in full motion. Their stiff persona is embodied from within the wooden construction.

The sculptural practice of Marisol simultaneously distanced herself from her subject, while also reintroducing the artist's presence through a range of self-portraiture found in every sculpture. Unlike the majority of Pop artists, Marisol included her own presence within the critique she produced. She used her body as a reference for a range of drawings, paintings, photographs, and casts. This strategy was employed as a self-critique, but also identified herself clearly as a woman who faced prejudices within the current circumstances. As Luce Irigaray noted in her book This Sex Which is Not One, "to play with mimesis is thus, for a woman, to try to recover the place of her exploitation by discourse, without allowing herself to be simply reduced to it. It means to resubmit herself … to ideas about herself, that are elaborated in/by amasculine logic, but so as to make visible, by an effect of playful repetition what was supposed to remain invisible".

Like many other pop artists, Marisol cropped, enlarged, reframed, and replicated her subject matter from contemporary pop culture and everyday life in order to focus on their discontinuities. Paying attention to specific aspects of an image and/or the ideas outside of their original context, allowed for a thorough understanding of messages meant to be transparent. Through her mimetic approach, the notion of a 'woman' was broken down into individual signifiers in order to visually reassemble the irregularities of the representational parts. By producing these symbols through conflicting materials, she disassociated "woman" as an obvious entity and presented her rather as a product of a series of symbolic parts.

Marisol further deconstructed the idea of true femininity in her sculptural grouping The Party (1965–1966), which featured a large number of figures adorned in found objects of the latest fashion. Although the dresses, shoes, gloves, and jewelry appear to be genuine at first, they are actually inexpensive imitations of presumably precious consumer goods. Subjects are adorned in costume supplies, paint, and advertising photographs that suggest a fabricated sense of truth. This style disassociated ideas of femininity as being authentic, but rather considered the concept to be a repetition of fictional ideas. Through Marisol's theatric and satiric imitation, common signifiers of 'femininity' are explained as patriarchal logic established through a repetition of representation within the media. By incorporating herself within a work as the 'feminine' façade under scrutiny, Marisol effectively conveyed a 'feminine' subject as capable of taking control of her own depiction.

Marisol mimicked the imaginary construct of what it means to be a woman, as well as the role of the "artist". She accomplished this through combining sensibilities of both Action painting and Pop art. Marisol utilized the spontaneous gesture of expression within Action painting along with the cool and collected artistic intent of Pop art. Marisol's sculptures questioned the authenticity of the constructed self, suggesting it was instead contrived from representational parts. Art was used not as a platform of personal expression, but as an opportunity to expose the self as an imagined creation. By juxtaposing different signifiers of femininity, Marisol explained the way in which "femininity" is culturally produced. But, by incorporating casts of her own hands and expressional strokes in her work, Marisol combined symbols of the 'artist' identity celebrated throughout art history. This approach destabilized the idea of artistic virtue as a rhetorical construct of masculine logic. Therefore, "Collapsing the distance between the role of woman and that of artist by treating the signs of artistic masculinity as no less contingent, no less the product of representation, than are the signs of femininity." Marisol exposed the merit of an artist as a fictional identity that must be enacted through the repetition of representational parts.

Marisol's mimetic practice included the imitation of celebrities such as Andy Warhol, John Wayne, and French President Charles de Gaulle, through a series of a series of portraits based from found imagery. The sculptures were based on existing photographs, which were interpreted by the artist and transformed into a new material format. By imitating a sourced image, the subject's charged history was preserved within the work. This approach of using pre-fabricated information, allowed for the product to retain meaning as a cultural artifact. Furthermore, this way of creation added distance between artist and subject that retained the Pop art adjective, as the likeness of character was purely formed by the likeness of a photo.

The sculptural imitation of President Charles de Gaulle (1967) for example, as a leader of France known for his autocratic style of leadership. Marisol deliberately chose an image of de Gaulle, who was known to always be composed, as an older man. She Manipulated his crucial characteristics, mannerisms, and attributes to effectively subvert his position of power as one of vulnerability. De Gaulle's features were emphasized in order to create a caricature, by exaggerating his jowl, distancing his eyes, narrowing his mouth, and skewing his tie. His uniform, cast hand, and static carriage made the sculpture overtly asymmetrical to suggest the general public's concern for government correctness. The public was informed of the subject's flaws, suggesting both a commonality and tension between subject, audience, and herself.

Marisol's artistic practice has often been excluded from art history, both by art critics and early feminists. For feminists her work was often perceived as reproducing tropes of femininity from an uncritical standpoint, therefore repeating modes of valorization they hoped to move past. Although, Pop art critics would use her "femininity" as the conceptual framework to distinguish the difference between her sentimentality and that of her male associates objectivity. Marisol produced satiric social commentaries in concern to gender and race, which being a woman of color is a circumstance she lives in. Instead of omitting her subjectivity, she used her 'femininity' as a mode of deconstructing and redefining the ideas of 'woman' and 'artist', giving herself control of her own representation.

=== Visage ===
Within several of her sculptures, Marisol incorporated her own visage. Sculptures that included her face were either in the form of plaster casts, photographs, or drawings during the 60s in the height of the Pop art movement, such as The Party (1965-1966), Women and Dog (1964), and Baby Boy (1962-1963). In response to accusations of being self-centered, Marisol responded that the use of her own face was intended to be more efficient. Most artworks that include her face involved the depiction of women living through social expectations of femininity. With the insertion of her face, Marisol simultaneously criticized and acknowledged the struggles women go through in living under patriarchal views in society.

== Pop art ==
It was in the following decade of the 1960s that Marisol began to be associated with pop artists such as Andy Warhol and Roy Lichtenstein. She appeared in several early films by Warhol, among them The Kiss (1963) and 13 Most Beautiful Girls (1964). One of her best-known works from this period is The Party, a life-size group installation of figures at the Toledo Museum of Art. All the figures, gathered together in various guises of the social elite, sport Marisol's face. Marisol dropped her family surname of Escobar in order to divest herself of a patrilineal identity and to "stand out from the crowd".

Her predisposition toward the forms of Pop Art stems, in part, from some of her earliest art training, dating back to her time under Howard Warshaw at the Jepson Art Institute. In an article exploring yearbook illustrations of a very young Marisol, author Albert Boimes notes the often uncited shared influence between her work and other Pop artists. He suggests a strong shared influence from both the Ashcan School and the form of Comics in general. He explains that "Marisol inherited some of the features of this tradition by way of her training under Howard Warshaw and Yasuo Kaiyoshi." Boimes also notes the profound effect that Comic book art had on the Pop Artists and Marisol herself, not to mention that the origins of the comic strip are deeply intertwined with the Ashcan School, explaining that, "The pioneers associated with the Ashcan School sprang from the same roots as pioneer cartoonists," and that, "almost all began their careers as cartoonists." He writes that comic strips and comic books, as well as animated cartoons, held a particular appeal for an entire generation of artists born around 1930, including Claes Oldenburg, Mel Ramos, Andy Warhol, Tom Wesselmann, James Rosenquist, and of course Roy Lichtenstein, the oldest of this group," all of whom were associated to one degree or another with Pop. Boime notes that "for a time Warshaw worked for Warner Bros. Animation drawing Bugs Bunny, and he later drew for The Walt Disney Company," and that there were "...numerous points of contact between Disney and the Jepson Art Institute..."

Marisol drifted through many artistic movements. "Not Pop, Not Op, It's Marisol!" was the way Grace Glueck titled her article in The New York Times in 1965: "Silence was an integral part of Marisol's work and life. She was said to have spoken no more than she needed to, and in her work she been described as having to bestowed silence with 'form and weight'. She talked little of her career and once stated, 'I have always been very fortunate. People like what I do.'"

In 1966-67, she completed Hugh Hefner, a sculptural portrait of the celebrity magazine publisher. She depicted him with two copies of his trademark smoking pipe, one painted, and the other a real one projecting aggressively from the front of the piece. The sculpture was featured on the March 3, 1967, cover of Time magazine. The work was acquired by Time, and is now in the collection of the National Portrait Gallery of the Smithsonian Institution. Curator Wendy Wick Reaves said that Escobar is "always using humor and wit to unsettle us, to take all of our expectations of what a sculptor should be and what a portrait should be and messing with them. So when she's asked why there are two pipes, she says, 'Well, Hugh Hefner has too much of everything.'"

Marisol's diversity, unique eye and character set her apart from any one school of thought. She has often included portraits of public figures, family members and friends in her sculpture. In one exhibit, "Marisol Escobar's The Kennedys criticized the larger-than-life image of the family" (Walsh, 8). In 1982-1984, her respect for Leonardo da Vinci led her to make a life-sized sculptural representation of herself contemplating her full-sized tableau of The Last Supper. She also did a work based on da Vinci's The Virgin with St. Anne.

== Recognition ==
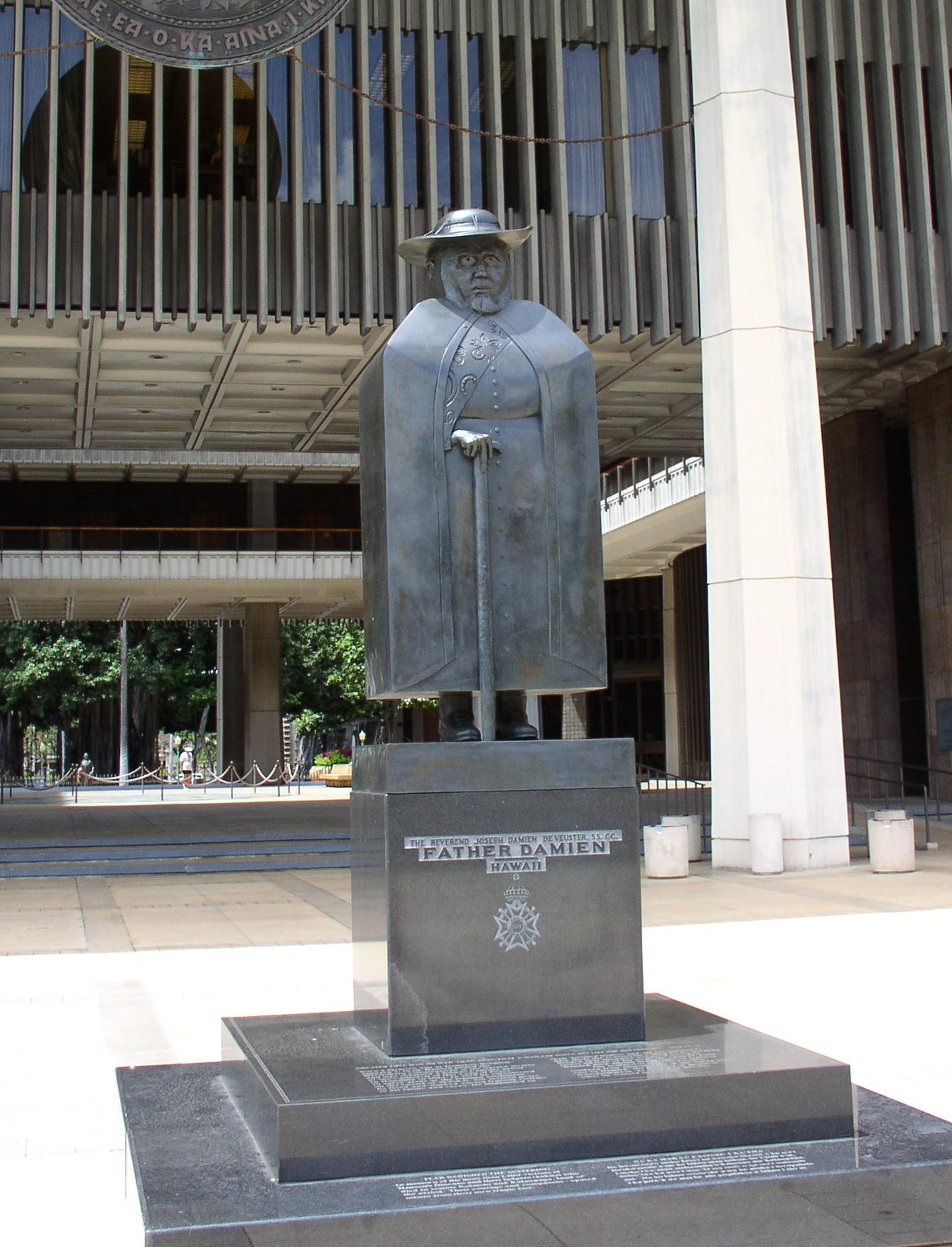
Father Damien (1969) stands at the entrance to the Hawaii State Capitol in Honolulu

Marisol's image is included in the iconic 1972 poster Some Living American Women Artists by Mary Beth Edelson.

In Pop art, the role of a "woman" was consistently referred to as either mother or seductress and rarely presented in terms of a female perspective. This portrayal, set within Pop art, was predominately determined by male artists, who commonly portrayed women as commoditized sex objects. As Judy Chicago explained to Holly Williams in her interview for "The Independent" in 2015, there was very little recognition for female artists and artists of color. She was one of many artists disregarded due to the existing modernist canon, which positioned her outside of the core of pop as the feminine opposite to her established male counterparts.

Working within a patriarchal field, women often obscured their gender identity in fear of their work being reduced to a "female sensibility". Marisol was one of the few who embraced her gender identity. Critical evaluation of Marisol's practice concluded that her feminine view was a reason to separate her from other Pop artists, as she offered sentimental satire rather than a deadpan attitude. Like many artists at that time feared, the female sensibility was the reason Marisol was often marginalized.

Art critics, such as Lucy Lippard, began to recognize Marisol in terms of Pop art in 1965. At this time, her sculpture was recognized relative to certain pop objectives. Yet, Lippard primarily spoke of the ways in which Marisol's work differentiated from the intentions of Pop figureheads Frank Stella, Roy Lichtenstein, and Donald Judd. Lippard defined a Pop artist as an impartial spectator of mass culture depicting modernity through parody, humor, and/or social commentary. Through an objective attitude, she claimed an artist could maintain a position of 'masculine' detachment from the subjects being depicted. As a female artist of color, critics distinguished Marisol from Pop as a 'wise primitive' due to the folk and childlike qualities within her sculptures.

Unlike Pop artists of the period, Marisol's sculpture acted as a satiric criticism of contemporary life in which her presence was included in the representations of upper middle-class femininity. Simultaneously, by including her personal presence through photographs and molds, the artist illustrated a self-critique in connection to the human circumstances relevant to all living the "American dream". Marisol depicted the human vulnerability that was common to all subjects within a feminist critique and differentiated from the controlling male viewpoint of her Pop art associates. Instead of omitting her subjectivity as a woman of color, Marisol redefined female identity by making representations that made mockery of current stereotypes.

Critical evaluation of Marisol's practice concluded that her feminine view was a reason to separate her from other Pop artists, as she offered sentimental satire rather than a deadpan attitude. Like many artists feared, this female sensibility was the cause for her to be marginalized by critics as outside of the conceptual framework of Pop Art. Marisol's wit was disregarded as feminine playfulness, therefore, lacking the objectivity and expressionless attitude of male pop artists. Their masculine superiority was celebrated in its opposition to the possibility of an articulate 'feminine' perspective. As Whiting further clarified in her article Figuring Marisol's Femininities, "without feminine Pop, there could not have been a masculine Pop in opposition; without the soft periphery, there could have been no hard core".

== Late career ==
Marisol received awards including the 1997 Premio Gabriela Mistral from the Organization of American States for her contribution to Inter-American culture. She was elected to membership in the American Academy of Arts and Letters in 1978. Marisol created a series of wood sculptures in the 1990s, mostly depicting Native Americans. Two exhibits of these works were not well received and she felt misunderstood. In 2004, Marisol's work was featured in "MoMA at El Museo", an exhibition of Latin American artists held at the Museum of Modern Art. Marisol's work has attracted increased interest, including a major retrospective in 2014 at the Memphis Brooks Museum of Art in Memphis, Tennessee, which also became her first solo show in New York City, at Museo del Barrio.

== Last years ==
Escobar last lived in the TriBeCa district of New York City, and was in frail health towards the end of her life. She suffered from Alzheimer's disease, and died on April 30, 2016, in New York City from pneumonia, aged 85.

In April 2017, it was announced that Marisol's entire estate had been left to the Albright-Knox Art Gallery in Buffalo, New York now renamed the Buffalo AKG Art Museum.

In 2021 the Andy Warhol Museum in Pittsburgh presented Marisol and Warhol Take New York, an exhibition that posited connections between the rising artistic careers of Marisol and Andy Warhol, who were friends throughout their lives. The exhibition traveled to Pérez Art Museum Miami. An accompanying catalogue was published by the Warhol Museum and PAMM on the occasion of the exhibition.

== Collections ==
In addition to the largest collection of her work in the world at the Buffalo AKG Art Museum, her work is included in the collections of the Pérez Art Museum Miami, The Metropolitan Museum of Art, the Currier Museum of Art, ICA Boston, Museum Boijmans Van Beuningen, and the Museum of Modern Art, among many others.

== Awards ==
- 1997 Premio Gabriela Mistral from Organization of American States American Academy of Arts and Letters
- 2016 Paez Medal of Art from VAEA (granted while alive, bestowed post mortem)

== Retrospective ==
- Pérez Art Museum Miami, Florida, USA, 15.04.2022 - 05.09.2022, Marisol and Warhol Take New York
- Toledo Museum of Art, Toledo, Ohio, USA, 02.03.2024 - 02.06.2024
- Buffalo AKG Art Museum, Buffalo, New York, USA, 12.07.2024 - 06.01.2025
- Louisiana, Museum for Modern and Contemporary Art, Humlebæk, Denmark, 01.10.2025 - 22.02.2026
- Kunsthaus Zürich, Switzerland, 17.04.2026 - 23.08.2026
- Centro Botín, Santander, Spain, The First Retrospektive of Marisol´s Drawings, 23.05.2026-25.10.2026

== See also ==
- National Prize of Plastic Arts of Venezuela
- Niki de Saint Phalle

== Works cited ==
- Avis Berman, "A Bold and Incisive Way of Portraying Movers and Shakers." Smithsonian, February 14, 1984: pp. 14–16.
- De Lamater, Peg. "Marisol's Public and Private De Gaulle." American Art, vol. 10, no. 1, 1996, pp. 91–93.
- Diehl, Carol. "Eye Of The Heart." Art In America 96.3 (2008): 158-181. Academic Search Complete. Web. 29 Oct. 2016
- Dreishpoon, Douglas. "Marisol Portrait Sculpture." Art Journal, vol. 50, no. 4, 1991, pp. 94–96.
- "Escobar, Marisol." The Hutchinson Encyclopedia. September 22, 2003
- Gardner, Paul "Who is Marisol?" ARTnews 88 May 1989: pp. 12–15.
- Hartwell, Patricia L. (editor), Retrospective 1967-1987, Hawaii State Foundation on Culture and the Arts, Honolulu, Hawaii, 1987, p. 135
- Irigaray, Luce. This Sex Which Is Not One. Ithaca: Cornell UP. 1985. Print
- "Marisol." The Columbia Encyclopedia. Sixth Edition; April 22, 2004.
- Potts, Alex. "The Image Valued 'As Found' And The Reconfiguring Of Mimesis In Post-War Art." Art History 37.4 (2014): 784-805. Art & Architecture Source. Web. 5 Dec. 2016.
- Walsh, Laura. "Life of JFK depicted through art at Bruce Museum Exhibit", AP Worldstream September 19, 2003: pg. 8.
- Westmacott, Jean. Marisol Escobar, Pop Art. New York: W. W. Norton & Company, 1989.
- Whiting, Cécile. "Figuring Marisol's Femininities." RACAR: Revue d'Art Canadienne / Canadian Art Review, vol. 18, no. 1/2, 1991, pp. 73–90.
- Williams, Holly. "Name One Female Pop Artist ..... Go." The Independent (2015): n. pag.
- 'Marisol Escobar- Biography", Rogallery, n.d. Web. September 21, 2015..
