= Statue of Father Damien =

Sculpture by Marisol Escobar

Coordinates: 21°18′27.72″N 157°51′24.99″W

Father Damien
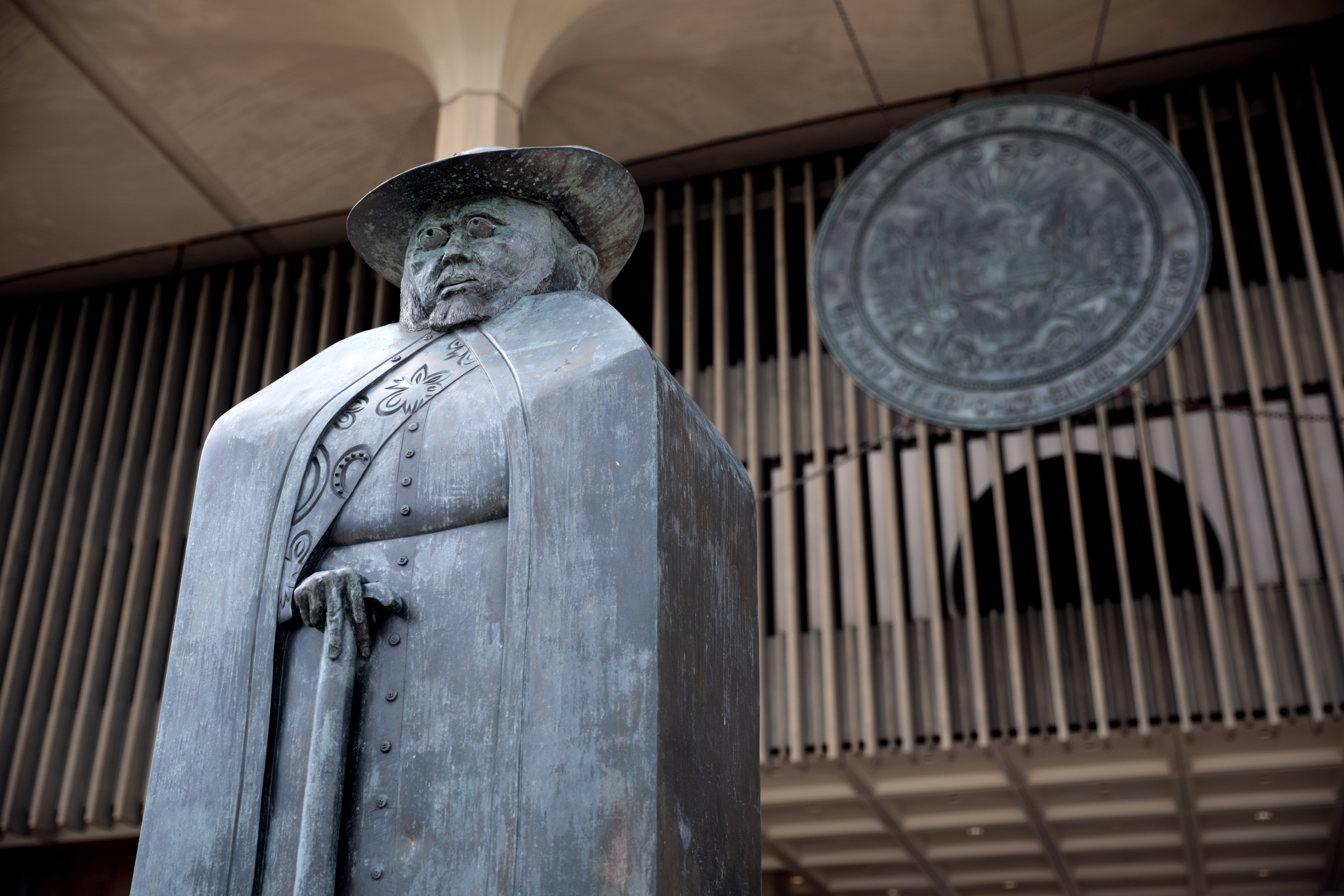
- The statue in front of the Hawaiʻi State Capitol
- Artist: Marisol Escobar
- Subject: Father Damien

The Father Damien Statue, also called the Saint Damien of Molokaʻi Statue, is the centerpiece of the entrance to the Hawaiʻi State Capitol and the Hawaiʻi State Legislature in Honolulu, Hawaiʻi. A second bronze cast is displayed in the National Statuary Hall Collection in the United States Capitol, along with the Kamehameha Statue. The landmark memorializes the famous Hawaiʻi Catholic Church priest from Belgium who sacrificed his life for the lepers of the island of Molokaʻi. Father Damien is considered one of the preeminent heroes of Hawaiʻi, and was canonized by Pope Benedict XVI on October 11, 2009. Cast in bronze, the statue depicts Father Damien in his later years after being diagnosed with the disease of those he attended. Much attention was given to the recreation of the disfiguring scars on the priest's face and his arm hanging from a sling.

== Marisol Escobar ==
Sixty-six artists bid for the commissioned project. Only seven were selected to create models to be reviewed by the Hawaiʻi State Statuary Hall Commission. Marisol Escobar, a New York City sculptor, won the bid. Commission members favored the contemporary feel and look of the Escobar design as opposed to the classical representations of Father Damien that others submitted. Her statue was based on a photo she saw of him near the end of his life, which is why he is wearing glasses and has his arm is in a sling.

Taking into consideration of Father Damien's work as a carpenter, Escobar created her initial model in wood. She made another model in plaster from which the bronze cast would be created. Unfortunately, the plaster model was broken during shipping to the foundry in Viareggio, Italy. A second plaster model was lost during shipment. Escobar finally sent a wax mold to the foundry. Coincidentally, the other most sacred of statues in Hawaiʻi, the Kamehameha Statue commissioned by King David Kalākaua, was also lost during travel (but later recovered).

== Father Damien Day ==
The official unveiling of the Father Damien Statue took place in the United States Capitol Rotunda on Father Damien Day, April 15, 1969 alongside a reproduction of the Kamehameha Statue. Hawaiʻi celebrates Father Damien Day annually, created by an act of the Hawaiʻi State Legislature. On that day, the statue in Honolulu is ceremoniously draped in leis followed by solemn song and prayer. In Catholicism, Father Damien is the spiritual patron of the outcast and those afflicted with AIDS and HIV.

== Other statues ==
Other statues of Father Damien are located in the United States Capitol as well as in Belgium, in the cities of Brussels, Leuven and Tremelo, his place of birth.
