= Olga Orozco =

Argentine poet

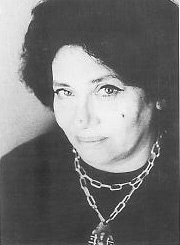
- Olga Orozco in 1960
- Born: Olga Noemí Gugliotta Orozco; 17 March 1920; Toay, La Pampa, Argentina
- Died: 15 August 1999 (aged 79); Buenos Aires, Argentina
- Occupations: Poet; Writer; Journalist
- Years active: 1946 - 1999
- Style: Surrealism
- Movement: Generation of '40

Olga Orozco (17 March 1920 – 15 August 1999) (full name: Olga Noemí Gugliotta Orozco) was an Argentine poet. She was a recipient of the FIL Award.

== Biography ==
She was born in Toay, La Pampa, to Carmelo Gugliotta, a Sicilian from Capo d'Orlando, and an Argentinean mother, Cecilia Orozco. She spent her childhood in Bahía Blanca and at age 16 moved to Buenos Aires with her parents, where she studied at the Faculty of Philosophy and Letters of the University of Buenos Aires, and later initiated her career as a writer. She began working for a newspaper company, where she published works under various pseudonyms.

Orozco directed some literary publications using some pseudonymous names while she worked as a journalist. She was a member of the «Tercera Vanguardia» generation, which had a strong surrealist tendency. No other information was provided about the group other than the fact that it functioned like a political party. Her poetic works were influenced by Rimbaud, Nerval, Baudelaire, Miłosz, and Rilke. Orozco's poetry explores themes of self-identity, death, mythology, and the occult. Her distinct style of writing and prosaic complexity have earned Orozco numerous literary awards, cementing her as "one of the major South American poets of the twentieth century". Her works have been translated into various languages.

Olga Orozco died in Buenos Aires from a heart attack at the age of 79.

== Prizes ==
- «Primer Premio Municipal de Poesía»
- «Premio de Honor de la Fundación Argentina» (1971)
- «Gran Premio del Fondo Nacional de las Artes»
- «Premio Esteban Echeverría»
- «Gran Premio de Honor» de la SADE, «Premio Nacional de Teatro a Pieza Inédita» (1972)
- «Premio Nacional de Poesía» (1988)
- «Laurea di Poesia dell'Università di Torino»
- «Premio Gabriela Mistral»
- «Premio de Literatura Latinoamericana y del Caribe Juan Rulfo» (1998).

== Tribute ==
On 17 March 2020, Google celebrated her 100th birthday with a Google Doodle.

== Main works ==
Engravings Torn from Insomnia, trans Mary Crow, BOA Editions, Ltd., 2002. Finalist for a PEN USA Translation Award. Published with a Lannan grant.

"The poet sees poetry even in the most mundane things" ("El poeta ve lo poético aun en las cosas más cotidianas")

- Desde lejos (From Far Away) (1946)
- Las muertes (The Deaths) (1951)
- Los juegos peligrosos (Dangerous Games) (1962)
- La oscuridad es otro sol(Darkness Is a Different Sun) (1967)
- Museo salvaje (Wild Museum) (1974)
- Veintinueve poemas (29 Poems) (1975)
- Cantos a Berenice (Songs for Berenice) (1977)
- Mutaciones de la realidad (Reality Mutations) (1979)
- La noche a la deriva (The Drifted Night) (1984)
- En el revés del cielo (In Heaven's Back Side) (1987)
- Con esta boca, en este mundo (With This Mouth, In This World) (1994).
