= Antonio Cisneros =

Peruvian poet (1942–2012)

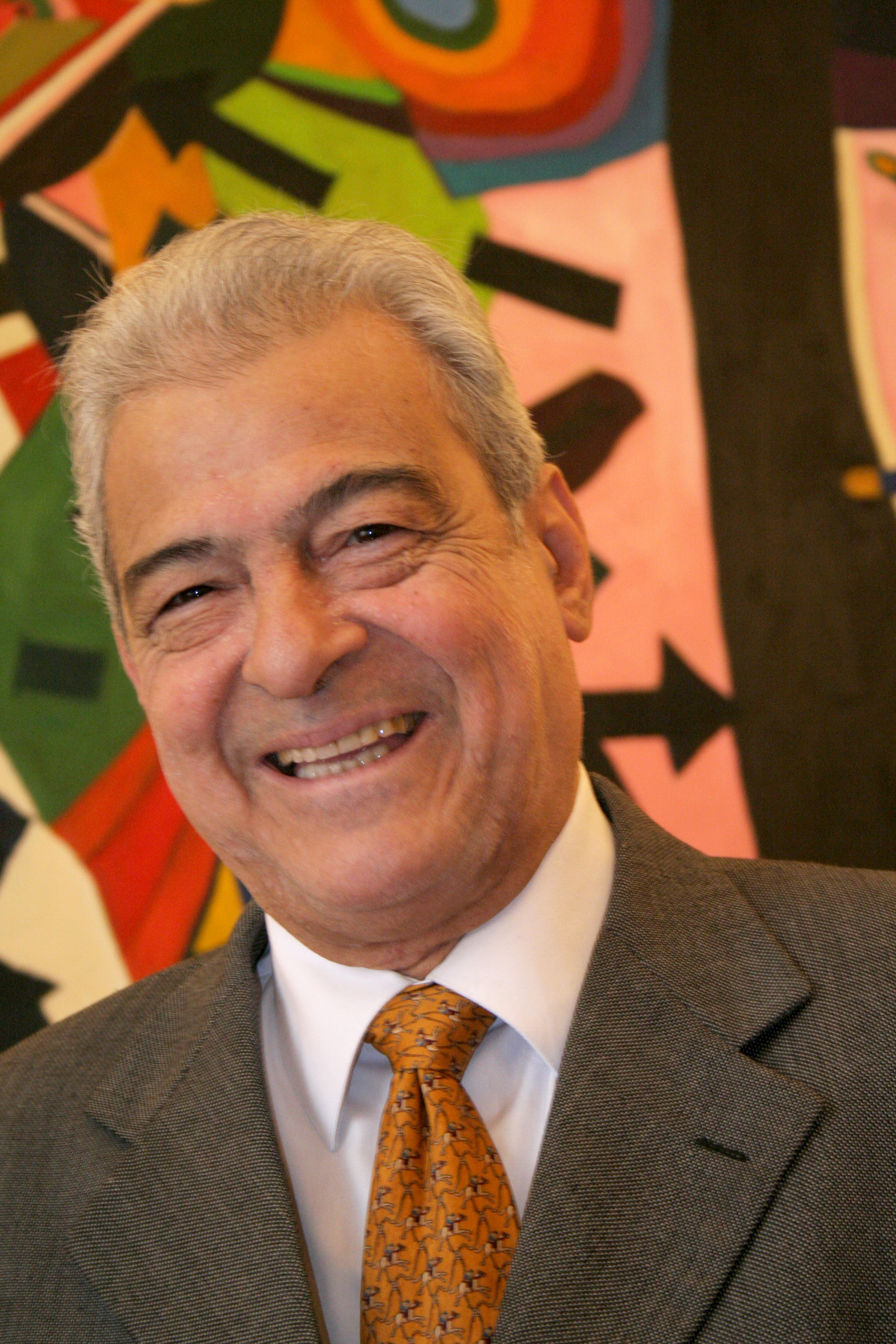
Antonio Cisneros

Antonio Alfonso Cisneros Campoy was a Peruvian poet, journalist and academic. He was born in Lima on 27 December 1942 and died there of lung cancer on 6 October 2012, aged 69.

== Career ==
Cisneros studied literature from 1960 to 1964 at the Pontifical Catholic University of Peru in Lima and later he took a PhD at the National University of San Marcos in 1974. While still a student he began to publish his poems, including the collections Destierro (1961), David (1962) and the prize-winning Comentarios reales de Antonio Cisneros (1964), the novelty of which assured his reputation. It was further widened by Canto ceremonial contra un oso hormiguero (1968), for which he gained the Cuban Casa de las Américas Prize.

That collection was the fruit of his critical involvement with the social problems of his time, but academic appointments abroad during the period of the political setbacks of socialism in Latin America kept him out of harm's way for a while. Between 1967 and 1969 he was at the University of Southampton and then until 1971 at the University of Nice Sophia Antipolis. There he wrote his Como higuera en un campo de golf in which he sets personal pain as the starting point for a critical examination of his own time. Again, after his return to Peru and appointment at San Marcos University, he accepted an exchange professorship at the University of Budapest for the year 1974–75 and references to his stay there appeared in his next collection El libro de Dios y de los húngaros (1978). As well as drawing on his travel experiences from a uniquely Hispano-American point of view, it announced his surprising conversion to Christianity.

Since then Cisneros taught during 1996 at the University of Virginia and, in addition, grants made possible stays in Paris, London and Berlin. His travels furthered his international reputation. There have been four translations of his work into English in the UK and the US and more into other languages. These include the Brazilian anthology of his work (Sete pragas depois 2003), as well as collections in Hungarian (Versei, Európa Könyvkiadó, Budapest 1978), Dutch (Commentaren en Kronieken, Marsyas, Amsterdam 1982), German (Gedichte, Vervuert, Frankfurt 1986) and French (Chant ceremonial contre un tamanoir, Editions Unes, París 1989; Les grandes questions celestes, Cahiers de Royamment, París 1990).

== Poetry ==
According to Alonso Rabí do Carmo, “the characteristics at the heart of Cisneros’ poetry are intertextuality and constant word-play; the simultaneous presence of the personal and the public or collective that achieves a new kind of epic discourse and dramatic harmony; the abolition of the false dichotomy between ‘pure poetry’ and ‘social poetry’ and the abandonment of any hint of provincialism or local reference, so as to situate the speaker within the poem in his own time, which provides the poetic individuality that is Cisneros’ trademark; the diverse use of the poem as a path to reflection and representation of the individual, the social and the cultural. This triad is given its own equal particularity and importance, whether addressing day-to-day experience, social relationships or historical context.”

The style emerged particularly in his first poetic success, Comentarios reales de Antonio Cisneros, in which the public account of the imperial enterprise is undermined by reinterpreting it from the point of view of the subject peoples. This is signalled by the play of meaning in the word real in his title, which can signify both ‘royal’ and ‘real’; the boastful official commentary on events is counterpointed in the collection against the bare statement of the human cost. The terse and understated accounts there make their point wittily without the need of further elaboration.

Sitting in your wooden chair,
Lord Priest,
you tell me that when I die
I shall see God.

I'd like to exchange my heaven
for your wooden chair!

The style was further elaborated in his next, equally successful collection, Canto ceremonial contra un oso hormiguero (1968); there too a growing familiarity with the new style of writing in the United States led Cisneros to experiment from then onwards with a more flowing, longer-lined poetry.

== Works ==
- Destierro (Lima 1961)
- David (Lima 1962)
- Comentarios reales de Antonio Cisneros (Lima 1964) (Premio Nacional de Poesía)
- Canto ceremonial contra un oso hormiguero (La Habana 1968, 1979) (Premio Casa de las Americas); (Buenos Aires 1969, Barcelona 1970, Lima 1988)
- Agua que no has de beber (Barcelona 1971)
- Como higuera en una campo de golf (Lima 1972; Era, Mexico 1973)
- El libro de Dios y de los húngaros (Lima 1978)
- Crónicas del Niño Jesús de Chilca (Mexico 1981) (Premio Rubén Darío)
- Agua que no has de beber y otros cantos (La Habana 1984)
- Monólogo de la casta Susana y otros poemas (Lima 1986)
- Por la noche los gatos: Poesia 1961-1986 (Fondo de Cultura Económica, México 1988)
- Poesía, una historia de locos 1962-1986 (Madrid 1989)
- Material de lectura (Mexico 1989)
- Propios como ajenos: Poesia 1962-1988 (Lima 1989, 1991, 2007)
- Drácula de Bram Stoker y otros poemas (Montevideo 1991) (Premio Parra del Riego)
- Las inmensas preguntas celestes (Lima, Madrid, 1992).
- Poesía reunida" (Lima 1996)
- Postales para Lima, Editora Colihue, Buenos Aires (1999)
- Poesía (3 volumes), PEISA & Arango Editores, Bogotá (2001)
- Comentarios reales (selected poems) (Valencia 2003)
- Un Crucero a las Islas Galápagos (prose poems) (Lima 2005, Valencia 2007, Mexico 2011)
- Como un carbón prendido entre la niebla (Santiago, Chile, 2007)
- A cada quien su animal (Mexico 2008)
- El caballo sin libertador (Mexico 2009)

Prose:

- El arte de envolver pescado (1990)
- El libro del buen salvaje (1995, 1997)
- El diente del Parnaso (manjares y menjunjes del letrado peruano) (2000)
- Ciudades en el tiempo (crónicas de viaje) (2001)
- Cuentos idiotas (para chicos con buenas notas) (2002)
- Los viajes del buen salvaje (crónicas) (2008)

Translations in English:

- The Spider Hangs Too Far from the Ground; Cape Goliard, London, 1970. Trans. Maureen Ahern, William Rowe and David Tipton
- Helicopters in the Kingdom of Peru; Rivelin/Equatorial, Bradford, 1981. Trans. Maureen Ahern, William Rowe and David Tipton
- Land of Angels; Aquila, Isle of Skye, 1985. Trans. Maureen Ahern, William Rowe and David Tipton
- At Night the Cats (bilingual edition); Red Dust Books, New York, 1985. Trans. Maureen Ahern, William Rowe and David Tipton
- A Cruise to the Galapagos Islands: new Marian songs (prose poems); Shearsman Books, Bristol, 2013. Trans. William Rowe

== Awards ==
- Premio Nacional de Poesía (1965)
- Premio Casa de las Américas (1968)
- Premio Rubén Darío (1980)
- Condecoración al Mérito Cultural de la República de Hungría (1990)
- Gabriela Mistral Inter-American Prize for Culture (2000) for his life's work
- Premio Iberoamericano de Letras "José Donoso" Santiago (2004)
- Caballero de la Orden de Artes y Letras del Gobierno Francés (2004)
- Salute to his works at the Encuentro de Poetas del Mundo Latino, Morelia (Mexico, 2009)
- Premio de Poetas del Mundo Latino Víctor Sandoval, Aguascalientes (Mexico, 2009)
- Pablo Neruda Ibero-American Poetry Award (Chile, 2010)
- Premio Southern (2011)

== Recordings ==
His voice and his poetry are recorded in the Word Archive of the Library of Congress in Washington DC, in the Archive of the Word of the Casa de las Américas in Havana, Cuba and in the Word Archive of the Silva Poetry House in Bogotá, Colombia.
