= Les têtes interverties =

1957 short film by Alejandro Jodorowsky

- Directed by: Alejandro Jodorowsky; Saul Gilbert; Ruth Michelly
- Written by: Alejandro Jodorowsky (uncredited); Saul Gilbert (uncredited); Ruth Michelly (uncredited)
- Based on: The Transposed Heads by Thomas Mann
- Produced by: Saul Gilbert
- Starring: Alejandro Jodorowsky; Raymond Devos; Saul Gilbert; Denise Brosseau; Marthe Mercury; Margot Loyola; François Perrot
- Edited by: Saul Gilbert
- Music by: Edgar Bischoff
- Release date: 1 May 1957
- Running time: 20m 26s
- Country: France
- Language: French

Les têtes interverties, also known as La cravate, The Transposed Heads and The Severed Heads, is a 1957 French short film written and directed by Alejandro Jodorowsky, Saul Gilbert, and Ruth Michelly. Shot between 1953 and 1957, the film is a mime adaptation of Thomas Mann's 1940 novella The Transposed Heads (Die vertauschten Köpfe). The film stars the surreal humorist Raymond Devos as well as Jodorowsky himself.
