= Fernando del Paso =

Mexican novelist, essayist and poet (1935–2018)

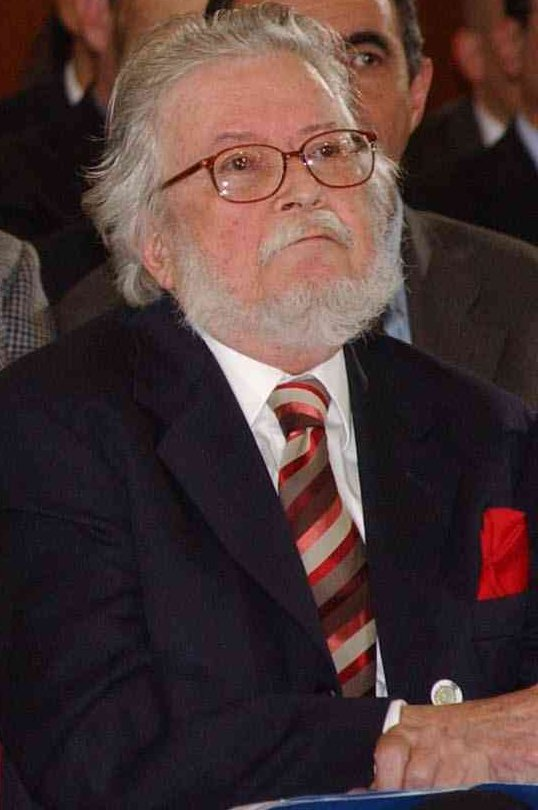
- Born: Fernando del Paso Morante; 1 April 1935; Mexico City, Mexico
- Died: 14 November 2018 (aged 83); Guadalajara, Jalisco, Mexico
- Writing career
- Language: Spanish
- Notable awards: Premio Miguel de Cervantes (2015)

Fernando del Paso Morante audio (1 April 1935 – 14 November 2018) was a Mexican novelist, essayist, and poet.

== Biography ==
Del Paso was born in Mexico City and studied economics for two years at the National Autonomous University of Mexico (UNAM). He then lived in London for 14 years, where he worked for the British Broadcasting Corporation, and in France, where he worked for Radio France Internationale and briefly served as Consul General of Mexico.

He was a member of Mexico's National College since 1996 and won several international awards, including the Premio Miguel de Cervantes (2015), Alfonso Reyes International Prize (2013), the FIL Literature Prize (2007) Guadalajara International Book Fair), the Rómulo Gallegos Prize (1982), the Best Novel Published in France Award (1985) for Palinurus of Mexico, the Xavier Villaurrutia Award (1966) and the Mexico Novel Award (1976).

Noticias del Imperio (1986) is an important contribution to the Latin American new historical novel. The novel, based upon the lives of Maximilian and Carlota and the French Intervention in Mexico, is called by the author a "historiographic" novel. This encyclopedic novel is remarkable in that, instead of trying to discover the "truth" about "what really happened," the author presents several possible versions of important and controversial events.

Del Paso claimed influence from various authors, including Joseph Conrad, James Joyce, William Faulkner, Virginia Woolf, Erskine Caldwell, and Thomas Wolfe.

=== Library and Media Center ===
On 14 May 2007, the Universidad de Guadalajara paid homage to Fernando del Paso by naming the library and media center in Ocotlán, Jalisco, the "Biblioteca Fernando del Paso". This library is the largest in western Mexico, with a collection of 120,000 volumes and the capacity for 800 simultaneous users.

== Awards ==
- Xavier Villaurrutia Award, 1966
- Rómulo Gallegos Prize, 1982
- FIL Literature Prize, 2007
- Alfonso Reyes International Prize, 2013
- Miguel de Cervantes Prize, 2015

== Selected works ==
- Sonetos del amor y de lo diario (poetry, 1958)
- José Trigo (novel, 1966)
- Palinuro de México (1976; translated as Palinuro of Mexico, 1989)
- Noticias del Imperio (novel, 1986; translated as News from the Empire, 2009)
- Douceur & passion cuisine mexicaine (París, 1991)
- Linda 67: Historia de un crimen (novel, 1995)
