= Premio Gabriela Mistral =

The Premio Gabriela Mistral (Premio Interamericano de Cultura "Gabriela Mistral" or Gabriela Mistral Inter-American Prize for Culture) was an award made by the Organization of American States. It was created in 1979 in memory of the Nobel laureate Gabriela Mistral.

No awards have been made since 2000.

== Awardees ==
The list of awardees includes:

- (Peru) Antonio Cisneros (2000) Artes Literarias
- (Venezuela) Marisol Escobar (1997) Artes Plásticas
- (Guyana) Martin Carter (1996) Artes Literarias
  - (Venezuela) José Antonio Abreu Artes Musicales
- (Argentina) Olga Orozco (1994) Artes Literarias
  - (Argentina) Gregorio Weimberg Filosofía
  - (Peru) Francisco Miró Quesada Cantuarias Filosofía
- (Brazil) Francisco Brennand (1993) Artes Plásticas
- (Mexico) Blas Galindo (1992) Artes Musicales
- (Nicaragua) Pablo Antonio Cuadra (1991) Artes Literarias
- Museo del Barro de Paraguay directed by Carlos Colombino (1990) Artes Plásticas
- (Chile) Juan Orrego Salas (1988) Artes Musicales
- (Mexico) Leopoldo Zea (1987) Artes Literarias
- (Brazil) Alfredo Volpi (1986) Artes Plásticas
- (United States) Robert Stevenson (1985) Artes Musicales
  - (Uruguay) Francisco Curt Lange Artes Musicales
- (Argentina) Ernesto Sábato (1984) Artes Literarias
