= Denise Brosseau =

Canadian actress

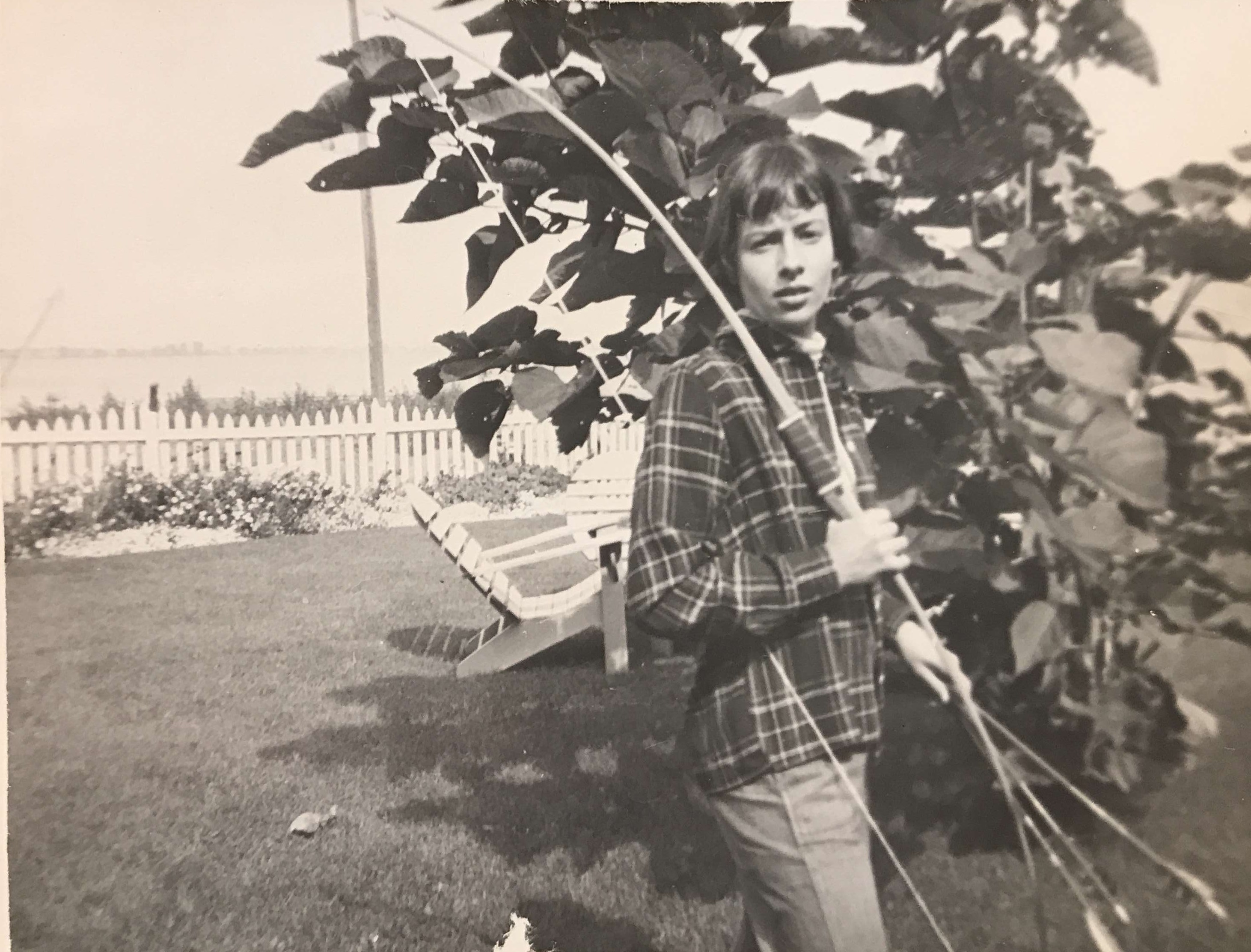
- Denise Brosseau in 1952
- Born: Denise Brosseau; 5 July 1936; Sorel, Quebec, Canada
- Died: 2 April 1986 (aged 49); Montreal, Quebec, Canada
- Other names: Denise Brossot, Denise Sorel, Denise Jodelle, Denise Brousseau, Denise Jodorowsky,
- Occupation: Actress

Denise Brosseau (Sorel, 5 July 1936 – Montreal, 2 April 1986) was a Mexican-Canadian actress, also known as Denise Brossot, Denise Brousseau, Denise Sorel, Denise Jodorowsky and Denise Jodelle. She held a main role in La Cravate, the first movie of Alejandro Jodorowsky.

== Biography ==
Denise Brosseau was born in Sorel, Quebec, Canada, in 1936. She was interested in acting since her youngest age, which is why she travelled to Paris with the journalist Francoise Gaudet-Smet. In France, she met the theater and film director Alejandro Jodorowsky, whom she married. In the 1960s both travelled to Mexico. In Mexico she met the abstract painter Fernando Garcia Ponce and married him 27 April 1972, after her divorce from Jodorowsky. Some years after her marriage with Garcia Ponce she decided to acquire Mexican citizenship. In 1976 the couple traveled to Paris, together with their only son. In Paris she suffered a psychological crisis which forced her to return to her parents' home in Canada. Months after that, she returned to Mexico temporarily, but she finally went back to Canada, where she died in 1986.

== Trajectory ==
She received her training as an actress at the École de Théâtre du Nouveau-Monde in Montreal and the École de la Rue Blanche in Paris. When she was travelling with Francoise Gaudet-Smet. she participated in a project of social observation in Morocco. In her beginnings she was interested in mime as a choice of career.

She had the role of Simone Turcotte in the soap opera 14, rue de Galais, created by André Giroux. The series was aired from 23 February 1954 to 4 April 1957. It was broadcast by Radio-Canada.

It was when she participated in the show at Alhambra-Maurice Chevalier in 1956 that Jacques Canetti suggested her to take Denise Sorel as an artistic name.

== Filmography ==
La Cravate (1957)

== Theater ==
In 1962 she plays in La ópera del orden, first panic theatre piece in Mexico.
