= Susana Chavez-Silverman =

Professor of Romance Languages and Literature at Pomona College

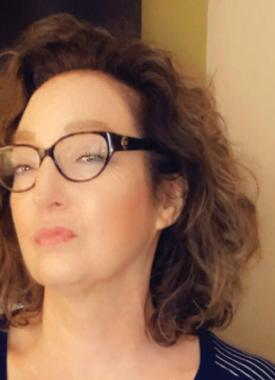
- Born: Los Angeles, CA
- Education: University of California, Davis; Harvard University; University of California, Irvine
- Occupations: Scholar, writer
- Known for: Multilingual creative nonfiction; crónicas; Latin American and US Latinx/Chicanx literature and culture; queer sexualities in Latin American and US Latinx literature and culture
- Notable work: Heartthrob: del Balboa Cafe al Apartheid and Back; Killer Crónicas: Bilingual Memories; Tropicalizations: Transcultural Representations of Latinidad
- Relatives: Joseph H. Silverman

Susana Chávez-Silverman is a U.S. Latina writer and professor of Romance Languages and Literatures at Pomona College in Claremont, California.

== Biography ==
Chávez-Silverman, born to a Jewish Hispanist father, Joseph H. Silverman, and language teacher June Chávez, was raised in a bilingual and bicultural atmosphere between Los Angeles, Madrid and Guadalajara, Mexico. After completing her education, traveling a great deal, and living in Boston, Berkeley, Los Angeles, Spain and South Africa, she resides in Claremont, California, where she is professor in the Department of Romance Languages and Literature at Pomona College. Her areas of expertise include creative nonfiction, Latin American and U.S. Latino/Chicano literature and culture, poetry, and queer sexualities in Latin American and Latino literature and culture.

== Education ==
Chávez-Silverman received her undergraduate degree in Spanish from University of California, Irvine in 1977, graduating magna cum laude. She continued her education at Harvard University where, in 1979, she received her master's degree in Romance Languages. In 1991, Chávez-Silverman received her PhD in Spanish from the University of California, Davis. Her dissertation was titled The Ex-Centric Self: The Poetry of Alejandra Pizarnik. Chávez-Silverman previously taught at University of California, Santa Cruz, University of California, Berkeley, University of California, Irvine, University of California, Davis, and the University of South Africa.

== Writing career ==
Chávez-Silverman writes in a style in that code-switches seamlessly between English and Spanish, without translation of either language. The style includes, for instance, “clever bilingual wordplay, such as ‘feliz’ (happy) to refer to homosexuals, and ‘anygüey’ for ‘anyway.’ Mixed in are countless Latin-American regionalisms, joking phonetic spellings and faux translations, such as ‘ternura’ for ‘tenure.’

Chávez-Silverman's first bilingual creative nonfiction work, Killer Crónicas: Bilingual Memories, was published by the University of Wisconsin Press in 2004. This collection of chronicles began in 2001, after the US National Endowment for the Humanities (NEH) awarded Chávez-Silverman a fellowship for a project on contemporary Argentine women's poetry. She spent thirteen months in Buenos Aires where, in addition to researching for and writing her official (academic) book, she began to send bilingual, punning "letters from the southern [cone] front" to colleagues and friends by email. For an interview with the Pomona College Magazine, Chávez-Silverman said, "Living in Buenos Aires, that gorgeous, turn of the century city in a country on the brink of (economic) collapse—home to many of the authors and artists I had long admired (Jorge Luis Borges, Julio Cortázar, Alfonsina Storni, Alejandra Pizarnik, and before them the foundational Romantics, Domingo Faustino Sarmiento and Echeverría)—brought out a sense of self, displaced yet oddly at home, in a cultural, linguistic and even tangible way. In Buenos Aires, the fragmented parts of me, the voices, cultures, and places inside of me rubbed up against each other and struck fire. I called my email missives "Crónicas," inspired by the somewhat rough-hewn, journalistic, often fantastic first-hand accounts sent "home" by the early conquistadores, and refashioned by modern-day counterparts such as Carlos Monsiváis, Elena Poniatowska, and Cristina Pacheco." One of Chávez-Silverman's crónicas, "Anniversary Crónica," inspired by the June 16 anniversary of both her parents' wedding and that of the so-called "Soweto Riots" in South Africa, was awarded First prize in Personal Memoir in the 2002 "Chicano Literary Excellence Contest" sponsored by the literary magazine El Andar.

In 2010, Chávez-Silverman published her second collection of "crónicas." Scenes from la Cuenca de Los Angeles y otros Natural Disasters "follow[s] Chávez-Silverman’s personal history, from California to South Africa and Australia and back, from unfathomable loss to deeply felt joy."

Chávez-Silverman's most recent publication, Heartthrob: Del Balboa Cafe al Apartheid and Back, 2019, "weaves together English and Spanish to lay bare the raw intensity and true fragility of love." Written in Chávez-Silverman's familiar multilingual style, Heartthrob otherwise represents a departure from her previous work. With a strong, almost novelistic narrative arc, the book is a "love story for the ages," "based on detailed diary entries and confessional letters to family and friends," and deals with themes of belonging, migration, and South Africa under apartheid.

== Works ==
=== Books ===
- Heartthrob: del Balboa Cafe al Apartheid and Back. Madison: University of Wisconsin Press, 2019.
- Scenes from la Cuenca de L.A. y otros Natural Disasters. Madison: University of Wisconsin Press, 2010.
- Killer Crónicas: Bilingual Memories. Madison: University of Wisconsin Press, 2004. Includes a chapter that was awarded the el Andar Prize for Literary Excellence in the category of personal memoir.
- Reading and Writing the Ambiente: Queer Sexualities in Latino, Latin American and Spanish Culture. Eds. Susana Chávez-Silverman and Librada Hernández. Madison: University of Wisconsin Press, 2000.
- Tropicalizations: Transcultural Representations of Latinidad. Eds. Frances R. Aparicio and Susana Chávez- Silverman. Hanover, NH: University Press of New England, 1997.

=== Articles/Crónicas (select list) ===
- “CROWN Crónica” in “The Great Dis-Equalizer: the Covid-19 Crisis,” a special double curated issue of PORTAL, Journal of Multidisciplinary International Studies. Vol. 17, No. 1-2, Dec. 2020 (113-115).
- “Winter Solstice Wetland/de la Felicidad Crónica.” Hostos Review/Revista Hostosiana: An International Journal of Literature and Culture. Contemporary Queer Writing in English and Spanish in the Americas. Special Issue. Guest Editors: Claudia Salazar Jiménez & Larry La Fountain-Stokes, vol.16, 2020 (107-112).
- “Otro (mi) Modo de Ver Crónica.” Contrapuntos VI. Ed. Marcos Pico Rentería (January 2019).
- “After ‘The Turn of the Screw’/Life’s a Peach Crónica.” PORTAL, Journal of Multidisciplinary International Studies, vol. 15, no. 1-2, August 2018.
- “Axolotl/Bichos Raros Crónicas.” Hostos Review/Revista Hostosiana. Special Issue: Gestos de la Memoria/Gestures of Memory. Seven Latin American/Latina Writers of Jewish Origin in the U.S. Guest Editor: Carlota Caulfield. Núm/Issue 14, 2018 (December 2017), 93-95 (reprinted by permission of PORTAL, Journal of Multidisciplinary International Studies).
- “Cono Sur Mitzvah Crónica.” Hostos Review/Revista Hostosiana. Special Issue: Gestos de la Memoria/Gestures of Memory. Seven Latin American/Latina Writers of Jewish Origin in the U.S. Núm/Issue 14, 2018 (December 2017), 89-92 (from Killer Crónicas: Bilingual Memories, reprinted by permission of UWP).
- “Explosión Suave/GIFT Crónica.” Hostos Review/Revista Hostosiana. Special Issue: Gestos de la Memoria/Gestures of Memory. Seven Latin American/Latina Writers of Jewish Origin in the U.S. Núm/Issue 14, 2018 (December 2017), 96-98.
- “Ambigüedad en el Sur Crónica.” InterAlia: A Journal of Queer Studies. Special Issue: Entre Otros/as: Perspectivas Queer en el mundo hispánico. No. 12, July 2017 (279-282).
- “Southern Ecotone: Magnetic-Domestic Crónica.” InterAlia: A Journal of Queer Studies. Special Issue: Entre Otros/as: Perspectivas Queer en el mundo hispánico. No. 12, July 2017 (283-286).
- “Black Holes/Deshielo Crónica.” PORTAL, Journal of Multidisciplinary International Studies, vol. 14, no. 1, April 2017. Cultural Works: Transitions and Dislocations.
- “Casi Víspera/Baby Colibrí Resucitado Crónica.” PORTAL, Journal of Multidisciplinary International Studies vol. 14, no. 1, April 2017. Cultural Works: Transitions and Dislocations.
- “Solstice HartSeer: Recordando ‘La Chascona’ y ‘La Sebastiana’ Crónica.” PORTAL, Journal of Multidisciplinary International Studies, vol. 13, No. 1, January 2016. The Transcultural Edge, curated by Ilaria Vanni Accarigi.

== Honors ==
=== Grants and fellowships ===
- 2006: Lucas Artist Program Fellowship at the Montalvo Arts Center, Saratoga, CA
- 2000–01: NEH Fellowship for College Teachers

=== Honors and awards ===
- 2020: Heartthrob: Del Balboa Cafe al Apartheid and Back takes second place for best autobiography in the International Latino Book Awards
- 2002: First Prize (for “Anniversary Crónica”) in “el Andar” magazine's “Chicano Literary Excellence Contest”
- 1988–89: Dissertation Fellowship, UC Davis
- 1986–87: Regents Fellowship, UC Davis
- 1985-06: Graduate Opportunity Fellowship, UC Davis
- 1978–79: Graduate Fellowship, Harvard University

== Online recordings ==
- Audio recordings from “Killer Crónicas” and “Scenes from la Cuenca de Los Angeles y otros Natural Disasters,” read by the author (June 2010)
