= Leopoldo Zea Aguilar =

Mexican philosopher (1912–2004)

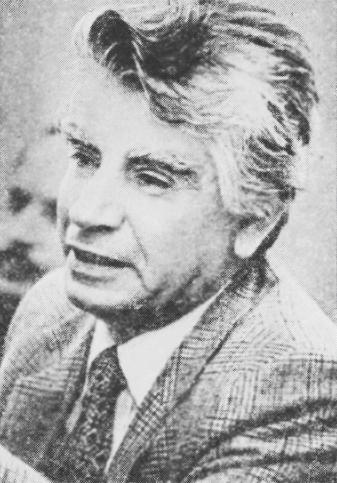
- Born: 30 June 1912; Mexico City
- Died: 8 June 2004 (aged 91); Mexico City

Philosophical work
- Era: 20th-century philosophy
- Region: Western philosophy

Leopoldo Zea Aguilar (30 June 1912 – 8 June 2004) was a Mexican philosopher and author.

== Career ==
One of the integral Latin Americanism thinkers in history, Zea became famous thanks to his master's thesis, El Positivismo en México (Positivism in Mexico, 1943), in which he applied and studied positivism in the context of his country and the world during the transition between the 19th and 20th centuries. With it he began the defense of American Integration, first suggested by the Liberator and Statesman Simón Bolívar, giving it his own interpretation based in the context of neocolonialism during the separation of the American Empire and Mexico.

In his works, Zea demonstrates that historical facts aren't independent from ideas, and that they do not arise from what is considered unusual, but from simple reactions to certain situations of human life.

In his vision of a united Latin America, he defended his beliefs concerning the place of mankind in the region. Zea explained that the discovery of 1492 was nothing more than a concealment in cultural and known terms, a product of the ideological cross-breeding of the configuration of the Latin American identity, a matter which he revealed on the 5th centenary in 1992. Later, he studied the ontological analysis of Latin America in the cultural and geo-historical planes.

Zea worked in 1933 in the office of Telégrafos Nacionales to help afford the costs of his secondary and university education. He was associated with the National Autonomous University of Mexico (UNAM) beginning with his training as a professor and philosopher in 1943. In 1947, he founded the Faculty of Philosophy and gave lectures on History of Ideas in America. In 1954, he was appointed to a full-time position as a researcher at the Philosophical Studies Center of the university.

In 1966, he became director of the college, holding this position until 1970. During his time as Director he founded the Latin American Studies College (in 1966) and later founded the Coordination and Propagation Center of the UNAM Latin American Studies (1978). He received multiple awards including the Premio Nacional de Ciencias y Artes in 1980, the Premio Interamericano de Cultura "Gabriela Mistral" (of the OAS) and the Medalla Belisario Domínguez (of the Senate of Mexico) in 2000. Three years later he was cataloged and honored by the UNAM as the oldest professor to work continually without interruptions until his death at age 91.

== Publications ==
- Superbus Philosophus
- El positivismo en México. Nacimiento, apogeo y decadencia
- Apogeo y decadencia del positivismo en México
- En torno a una filosofía americana
- Esquema para una historia del pensamiento en México
- Ensayos sobre filosofía de la historia
- Dos etapas del pensamiento en Hispanoamérica
- Conciencia y posibilidad del mexicano
- La filosofía como compromiso y otros ensayos
- América como conciencia
- La conciencia del hombre en la filosofía. Introducción à la filosofía
- El Occidente y la conciencia de México
- América en la conciencia de Europa
- La filosofía en México
- Del liberalismo à la revolución en la educación mexicana
- Esquema para una historia de las ideas en Iberoamérica
- América en la historia
- Las ideas en Iberoamérica en el siglo XIX
- La cultura y el hombre de nuestros días
- Democracia y dictaduras en Latinoamérica
- Dos ensayos
- Latinoamérica y el mundo
- Europa al margen de Occidente
- Antología del pensamiento social y político en América Latina
- Latinoamérica en la formación de nuestro tiempo
- El pensamiento latinoamericano
- Antología de la filosofía americana contemporánea
- La filosofía americana como filosofía sin más
- Colonización y descolonización de la cultura latinoamericana
- La esencia de lo americano
- Latinoamérica. Emancipación y neocolonialismo
- Los precursores del pensamiento latinoamericano contemporáneo
- Dependencia y liberación en la cultura latinoamericana
- Dialéctica de la conciencia americana
- La filosofía actual en América Latina (Coauthor)
- Filosofía latinoamericana
- Filosofía y cultura latinoamericanas
- Latinoamérica, Tercer Mundo
- Filosofía de la historia americana
- Pensamiento positivista latinoamericano (Selection and prologue)
- Simón Bolívar, integración en libertad
- Desarrollo de la creación cultural latinoamericana
- Latinoamérica en la encrucijada de la historia
- Sentido de la difusión cultural de América Latina
- Latinoamérica, un nuevo humanismo
- La transformación de la filosofía latinoamericana
- Filosofía de lo americano
- América como autodescubrimiento
- El problema cultural de América
- Discurso desde la marginación y la barbarie

Awards
Preceded by Carlos Fuentes	Belisario Domínguez Medal of Honor; 2000	Succeeded by José Ezequiel Iturriaga
