= Nélida Piñon =

Brazilian author and professor (1937–2022)

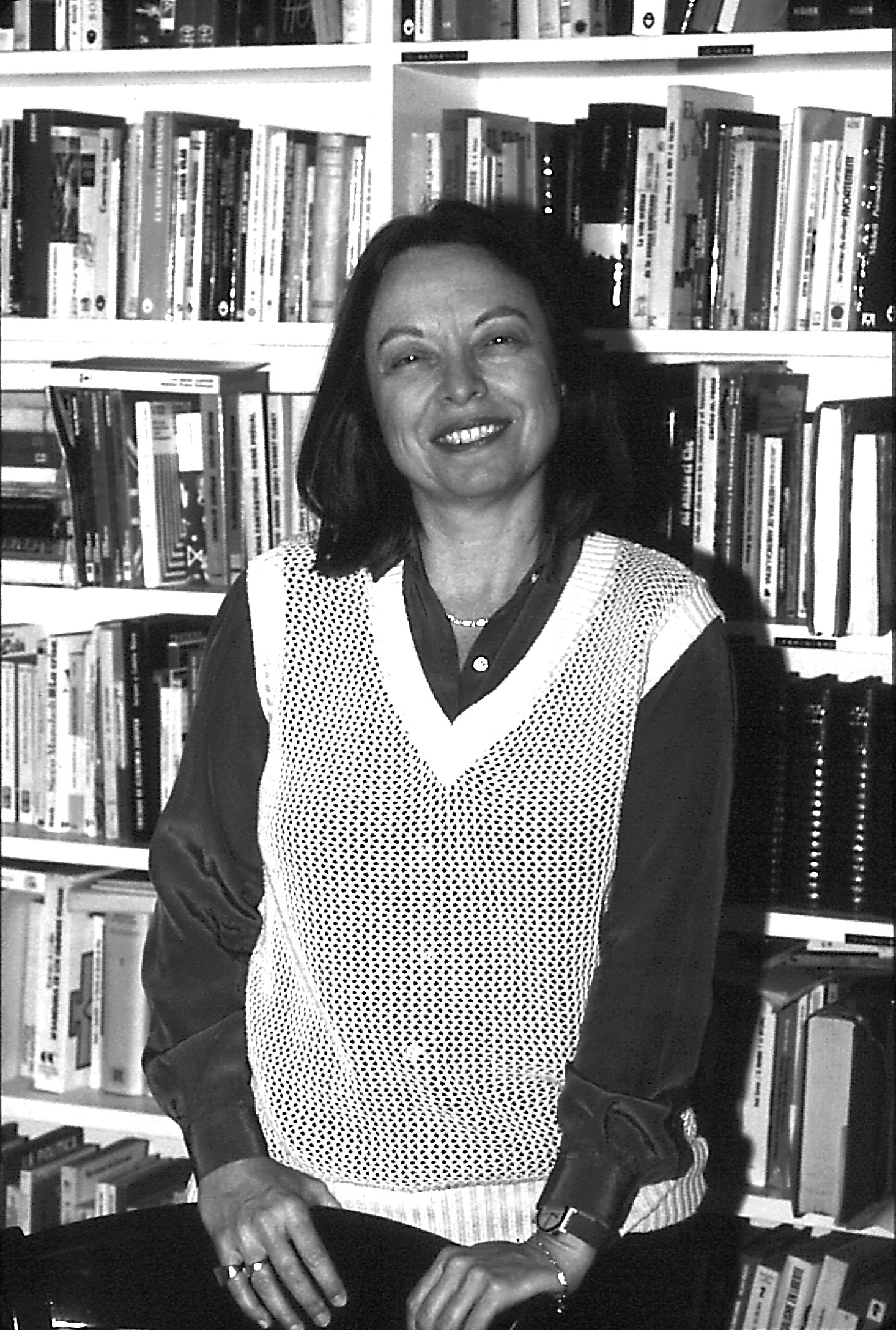
Nélida Piñon

Nélida Piñon (3 May 1937 – 17 December 2022) was a Brazilian author and professor. At the time of her death, Piñon was "considered among the foremost writers in Brazil today".

== Life ==
Nélida Cuiñas Piñon was born in 1937 in the middle class Vila Isabel area of Rio de Janeiro to Olivia Carmen Cuíñas Piñón, a homemaker and Lino Piñón Muíños, a merchant. Her mother was the child of Galician immigrants, her father a first generation Galician immigrant.

She studied at the Catholic University of Rio de Janeiro before working as a journalist for the newspaper O Globo and the magazine Cadernos Brasileiros. She has taught writing in workshops and institutions including Columbia University, Johns Hopkins and the University of Miami, where she had been the Stanford Professor of Humanities. She also gave courses on creative writing at the Faculty of Letters of the Federal University of Rio de Janeiro. In 2015, she assumed the José Bonifácio chair at the University of São Paulo, teaching courses at Ibero-American imaginary.

Her first novel was Guia-Mapa de Gabriel Arcanjo (The Guidebook of Archangel Gabriel), written in 1961. It concerns a protagonist discussing Christian doctrine with her guardian angel. In the 1970s, she became noted for erotic novels A casa de paixão (The House of Passion), published in 1972, and A força do destino (The Force of Destiny), published in 1977.

In 1984, she had perhaps her greatest success with A República dos Sonhos (The Republic of Dreams). The work involves generations of a family from Galicia, who emigrated to Brazil, which stemmed from her own family's experience.

Among other distinctions, Piñon was awarded the 1995 FIL Award and the 2005 Prince of Asturias Award for literature. She also was the President of Academia Brasileira de Letras (Brazilian Academy of Letters) from 1996 to 1997, and occupied the José Bonifácio Chair of Iberoamerican Affairs of the University of São Paulo in 2015. She received Spanish citizenship in 2021 from the Royal Decree.

Piñon died on 17 December 2022, at the age of 85, in Lisbon.

== Books ==
- Guia-Mapa de Gabriel Arcanjo (The Guidebook of Gabriel Arcanjo) (1961)
- Madeira Feita Cruz (1963)
- Fundador (Founder) (1969)
- A Casa da Paixão (The House of Passion) (1972)
- A força do destino (The Force of Destiny) (1977)
- The Republic of Dreams, tr. Helen Lane, University of Texas Press (1991), ISBN 0-292-77050-2
- A doce canção de Caetana (Caetana's Sweet Song) (1987)
- Tebas do meu coração (1997)
- Vozes do Deserto (2006)
- Coração Andarilho (2009)
- Livro das Horas (2012)
- Filhos da América (2016)
- Uma Furtiva Lágrima (2019)
- Um dia Chegarei a Sagres (2020)

== Short stories ==
- I love my husband.
- Big-Bellied Cow
- O Pão de Cada Dia

== Awards ==
- Walmap Prize, 1970, for her historical novel, 'Fundador' (Founders)
- Mario de Andrade Prize, 1973, from the Association of Arts Critics in São Paulo for her novel, "A casa de paixão"
- Brazilian Writers’ Union Prize, 1987
- FIL Award, 1995.
- Menéndez Pelayo International Prize, 2003
- Puterbaugh Conference on World Literature honoree, 2004
- Prince of Asturias Award, 2005
