= Sergio Pitol =

Mexican politician and writer (1933–2018)

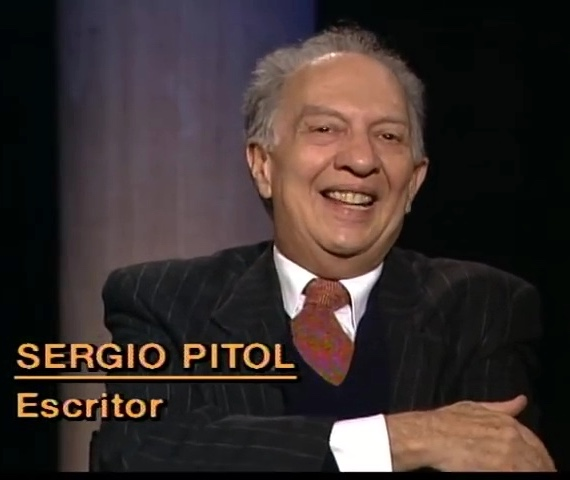
- Pitol on CUNY TV's Charlando con Cervantes, 1996
- Born: 18 March 1933; Puebla, Mexico
- Died: 12 April 2018 (aged 85); Xalapa, Mexico
- Occupations: Writer, translator and diplomat
- Awards: 1981 Xavier Villaurrutia Award; 1993 National Prize for Arts; 1999 Premio Juan Rulfo; 2005 Cervantes Prize

Sergio Pitol Deméneghi (18 March 1933 – 12 April 2018) was a Mexican writer, translator and diplomat. In 2005, he received the Cervantes Prize, the most prestigious literary award in the Spanish-speaking world.

== Early life ==
Born in Puebla, Mexico, Pitol spent his childhood in Ingenio de Potrero, a provincial town in the state of Veracruz. His mother died when he was four years old and soon after Pitol contracted malaria, which left him bedridden until about the age of 12. He was raised by his grandmother. As a teenager, Pitol moved to Córdoba, Veracruz.

== Education and diplomatic work ==
In 1950, Pitol moved to Mexico City to study law and literature at the Universidad Autónoma de México (UNAM). In 1960, he became a member of the Mexican Foreign Service and served over a number of years as cultural attaché in Rome, Belgrade, Warsaw, Paris, Beijing, Moscow, Prague, Budapest and Barcelona. In the 1980s, he served as ambassador to Czechoslovakia.

== Later years ==
Since 1993, he lived in Xalapa, capital of the state of Veracruz, where he taught at the Universidad Veracruzana. His final years were spent in poor health and he had struggled in particular with progressive aphasia, which prevented him from writing or talking. He died in Xalapa on 12 April 2018, aged 85.

== Writing career ==
Pitol's publications as translator include literary works by such authors as Jerzy Andrzejewski, Jane Austen, Giorgio Bassani, Kazimierz Brandys, Anton Chekhov, Joseph Conrad, Witold Gombrowicz, Henry James, Robert Graves, and Vladimir Nabokov. He also served as a professor at the UNAM, at the Universidad Veracruzana in Xalapa, and at the University of Bristol in England.

== Awards ==
In 2005, Pitol received the Cervantes Prize. Other major awards include the Premio Juan Rulfo (1999), Premio Herralde de Novela (1984) for El desfile del amor, and the Premio Xavier Villaurrutia (1981) for his short story, Nocturno de bujara from the collection of the same title.

In 1993 he received the National Prize for Arts in Linguistics and literature category.

== Selected works ==
=== Novels ===
- El tañido de una flauta (Era, Mexico City, 1972)
- Juegos florales (Siglo XXI, 1982)
- El desfile del amor (Anagrama, Barcelona 1984; The Love Parade, trans. George Henson; Deep Vellum Publishing, 2021)
- Domar a la divina garza (Anagrama, Barcelona, 1988; Taming the Divine Heron, trans. George Henson; Deep Vellum Publishing, 2023)
- La vida conjugal (Era, Mexico City; Anagrama, Barcelona, 1991)

=== Essay-memoirs ===
- El arte de la fuga (Era, Mexico City, 1996; The Art of Flight, trans. George Henson; Deep Vellum Publishing, 2015)
- El viaje (Era, Mexico City, 2000; The Journey, trans. George Henson; Deep Vellum Publishing, 2015)
- El mago de Viena (Pre-Textos, Valencia, 2005; The Magician of Vienna, trans. George Henson; Deep Vellum Publishing, 2017)

=== Short-story collections ===
- Tiempo cercado (Editorial Estaciones, Mexico City, 1959)
- Infierno de todos (Universidad Veracruzana, Xalapa, 1964)
- Los climas (Joaquín Mortiz, Mexico City, 1966)
- No hay tal lugar (Era, Mexico City, 1967)
- Del encuentro nupcial (Tusquets, Barcelona, 1970)
- Infierno de todos 2da. edición revisada y aumentada (Seix Barral, Barcelona, 1971)
- Los climas 2da. edición revisada y aumentada (Seix Barral, Barcelona, 1972)
- Nocturno de Bujara (Siglo XXI, Mexico City, 1981)
- Cementerio de tordos (Ediciones Océano, 1982)
- Vals de Mefisto (Anagrama, Barcelona, 1984; Mephisto's Waltz, Trans. George Henson; Deep Vellum Publishing, 2019)
- Cuerpo presente (Era, México, 1990)
- El relato veneciano de Billie Upward (Monte Ávila Editores, Caracas, 1992)
- Todos los cuentos (Alfaguara, Mexico City, 1998)
- El oscuro hermano gemelo y otros relatos (Norma, Bogotá, 2004)
- Obras reunidas III Cuentos y relatos (México, Fondo de Cultura Económica, 2004)
- Los mejores cuentos [presentación de Enrique Vila-Matas] (Anagrama, Barcelona, 2005)
- Ícaro (Oaxaca, Almadía, 2007)
- Cuentos [edición de José Luis Nogales] (Madrid, Ediciones Cátedra, 2021)
