= FIL Award =

Literary award

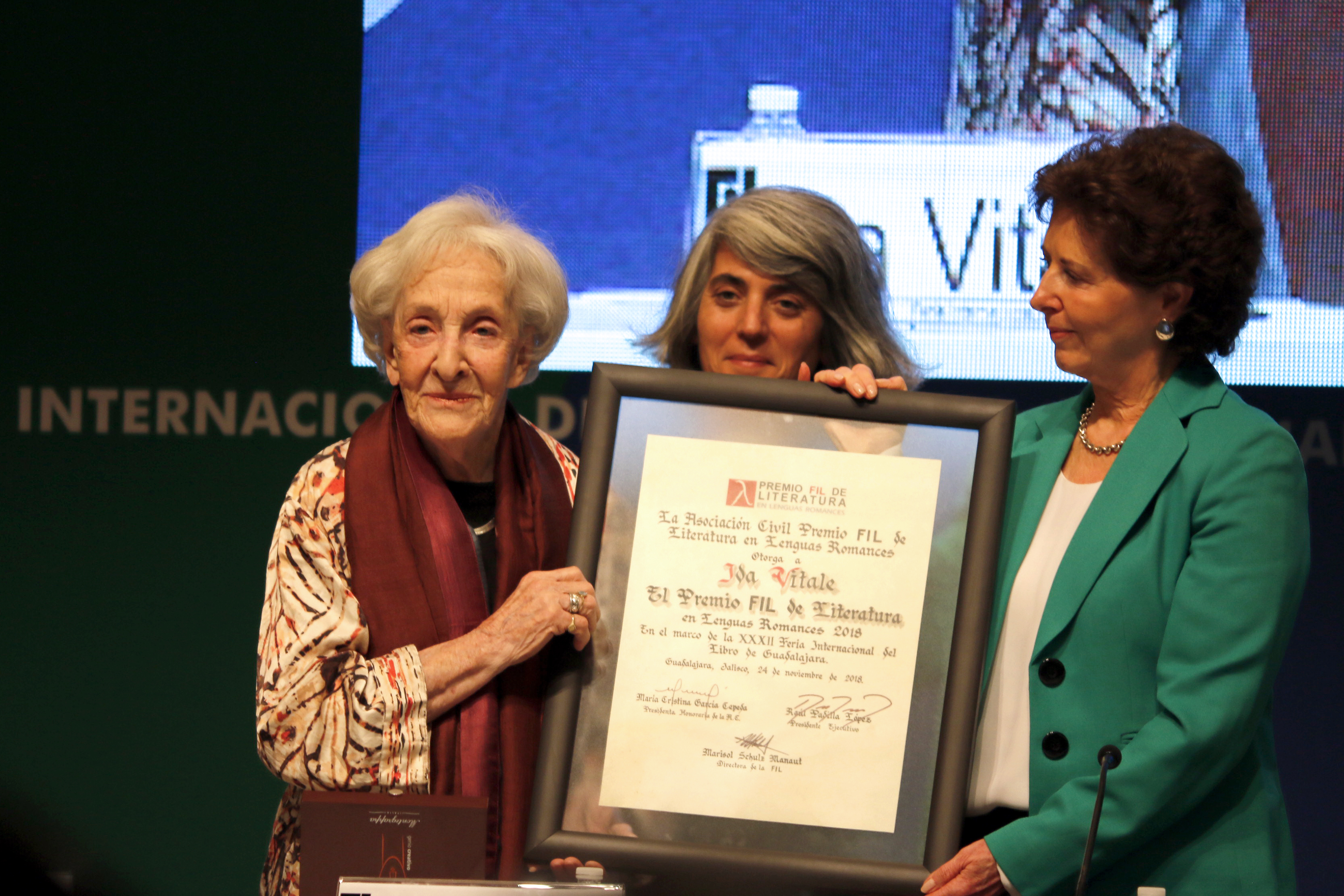
Ida Vitale (left) receiving the award in 2018.

The FIL Literary Award in Romance Languages (Premio FIL de Literatura en Lenguas Romances, previously the Juan Rulfo Prize for Latin American and Caribbean Literature) is awarded to writers of any genre of literature (poetry, novels, plays, short stories and literary essays) working in one of the Romance languages: Spanish, Catalan, Galician, French, Occitan, Italian, Romanian or Portuguese. Endowed with US$150,000, it is given to a writer in recognition to all their work, making it one of the richest literary prizes in the world.

It was created in 1991 to acknowledge, in the beginning, writers of literature from Latin America or the Caribbean. It is organized by Mexico's National Council for Culture and Arts, the University of Guadalajara, the government of the state of Jalisco, and the Fondo de Cultura Económica and was originally named in honor of writer Juan Rulfo, a native of Sayula, Jalisco. It is awarded during the Guadalajara International Book Fair (FIL).

In 2005, the Rulfo family requested that the name be removed from association with the prize, given that it had become "the spoils of small groups that sought only to benefit their own interests". As a result, beginning in 2006, the award was renamed the FIL Literary Award in Romance Languages.

== Prize winners ==
Year	Author	Nationality
1991	Nicanor Parra	Chile
1992	Juan José Arreola	Mexico
1993	Eliseo Diego	Cuba
1994	Julio Ramón Ribeyro	Peru
1995	Nélida Piñon	Brazil
1996	Augusto Monterroso	Guatemala
1997	Juan Marsé	Spain
1998	Olga Orozco	Argentina
1999	Sergio Pitol	Mexico
2000	Juan Gelman	Argentina
2001	Juan García Ponce	Mexico
2002	Cintio Vitier	Cuba
2003	Rubem Fonseca	Brazil
2004	Juan Goytisolo	Spain
2005	Tomás Segovia	Spain-Mexico
2006	Carlos Monsiváis	Mexico
2007	Fernando del Paso	Mexico
2008	António Lobo Antunes	Portugal
2009	Rafael Cadenas	Venezuela
2010	Margo Glantz	Mexico
2011	Fernando Vallejo	Colombia
2012	Alfredo Bryce Echenique	Peru
2013	Yves Bonnefoy	France
2014	Claudio Magris	Italy
2015	Enrique Vila-Matas	Spain
2016	Norman Manea	Romania
2017	Emmanuel Carrère	France
2018	Ida Vitale	Uruguay
2019	David Huerta	Mexico
2020	Lídia Jorge	Portugal
2021	Diamela Eltit	Chile
2022	Mircea Cărtărescu	Romania
2023	Coral Bracho	Mexico
2024	Mia Couto	Mozambique
2025	Amin Maalouf	France
2026	Gioconda Belli	Nicaragua
