= First ladies and gentlemen of Puerto Rico =

First Gentleman of Puerto Rico
- Incumbent; José Yovin Vargas since January 2, 2025
- Style: First Gentleman of Puerto Rico (diplomatic); The First Gentleman (third person)
- Residence: La Fortaleza
- Inaugural holder: Inés Mendoza
- Formation: 2 January 1949
- Website: Official website

First Lady or First Gentleman of Puerto Rico (Spanish: Primera Dama o Primer Caballero de Puerto Rico) is the official title given by the government of Puerto Rico to the spouse of the governor of Puerto Rico or the relatives of the governor, should the holder be unmarried. The governor's spouse leads the Office of the First Lady or First Gentleman of Puerto Rico.

The current first gentleman of Puerto Rico is José Yovin Vargas, the husband of current governor of Puerto Rico Jenniffer González-Colón.

== Role ==
The position of First Lady or First Gentleman carries no official duty and receives no compensation for their service. They generally oversee the administration of La Fortaleza, the mansion that serves as the governor's residence and office. They also organize events and civic programs, and typically get involved in different charities and social causes.

== Portraits ==
The official portraits of each first lady or first gentleman, beginning with Governor Jesús T. Piñero's wife, former first lady Aurelia Bou Ledesma, have been exhibited in La Fortaleza since Rafael Hernández Colón's administration. The portraits were originally located in the staircase that leads to the third floor private gubernatorial residence However, they have been relocated to several ceremonial rooms adjacent to the "Kennedy Bedroom" on the second floor of the executive mansion which is accessible to the public in most tours held at La Fortaleza.

First Lady Lucé Vela loaned the portraits to the Puerto Rico Department of State, to be seen by the public during two weeks in May 2009. The opening reception of the exhibit, presided by Secretary of State Kenneth McClintock, was attended by three governors (Luis Fortuño, Rafael Hernández Colón, and Carlos Romero Barceló), and four first ladies (Jeannette Ramos, Kate Donnelly, María Elena González, and Lucé Vela).

Most recently, a new official portrait of Lucé Vela was unveiled in La Fortaleza in July 2017. Official portraits of former first lady Wilma Pastrana and her husband, former governor Alejandro García Padilla, both painted by the late artist Arnaldo Roche Rabell, were added to residence's collection in November 2016.

== First ladies and gentlemen of Puerto Rico (since 1949) ==
First Lady or First Gentleman			Governor	Date tenure began	Date tenure ended	Date of death (age)	Notes
1		Inés Mendoza	Luis Muñoz Marín	January 2, 1949	January 2, 1965	August 13, 1990 (82)	Mendoza was the second wife of Puerto Rico's first directly elected governor, Luis Muñoz Marín, whom she married in 1946. She remains the longest serving first lady in Puerto Rico's history.
2		Conchita Dapena	Roberto Sánchez Vilella	January 2, 1965	1967	February 25, 2003	First Lady Conchita Dapena and Governor Roberto Sánchez Vilella separated in March 1967 after his affair with his legislative aide, Jeannette Ramos Buonomo, became public. They had been married for 31 years before their divorce. Governor Sánchez Vilella's affair and divorce from First Lady Dapena is credited with ending his political career.
3		Jeannette Ramos	Roberto Sánchez Vilella	October 1967	January 2, 1969	November 24, 2021 (89)	Ramos is the daughter of Ernesto Ramos Antonini. A former legislative aide of Governor Roberto Sánchez Vilella, Ramos' affair with the governor became public in March 1967 in a major political scandal. Governor Sanchez Vilella and Ramos married in a civil ceremony in Humacao, Puerto Rico, in October 1967, just two days after his divorce from former First Lady Conchita Dapena was finalized. This was Ramos' third marriage. Sánchez Vilella's affair and remarriage to Ramos effectively ended his political career and led to a split within his Popular Democratic Party.
4		Lorenza Ramírez de Arellano	Luis A. Ferré (father)	January 2, 1969	March 5, 1970	March 5, 1970	First Lady Lorenza Ramírez de Arellano died in role on March 5, 1970. Their daughter, Rosario Ferré, fulfilled the duties of first lady for the remainder of her father's tenure.
5		Rosario Ferré	Luis A. Ferré (father)	March 5, 1970	January 2, 1973	February 16, 2016 (77)	The daughter of the late First Lady Lorenza Ramírez de Arellano and Governor Luis Ferré, Rosario Ferré fulfilled the duties of the First Lady from 1970 to 1973 following the death of her mother. Ferré also began her graduate studies in literature during this time. She became an accomplished writer, poet, and essayist, with works published in both Spanish and English.
6		Lila Mayoral Wirshing	Rafael Hernández Colón	January 2, 1973	January 2, 1977	January 7, 2003 (60)	Lila Mayoral's first tenure as first lady.
7		Kate Donnelly	Carlos Romero Barceló	January 2, 1977	January 2, 1985	September 18, 2023	Donnelly, also known as Kate Romero, who was born in Baldwin, New York, moved to Puerto Rico in 1961 to take a job at the First National City Bank in San Juan. She married Carlos Romero Barceló, a lawyer, in 1966. She focused on poverty alleviation, women's rights, and education, and advocated for statehood during her tenure. Donnelly also published a cookbook, "Cocinando desde La Fortaleza", in 1984. She was later appointed as a trustee of the Conservation Trust of Puerto Rico.
8		Lila Mayoral Wirshing	Rafael Hernández Colón	January 2, 1985	January 2, 1993	January 7, 2003 (60)	Mayoral's second tenure as first lady. In September 1989, Hurricane Hugo struck Puerto Rico. First Lady Mayoral organized a fundraiser which raised $15.6 million for reconstruction. She also oversaw the construction of new hurricane shelters on the islands of Culebra and Vieques.
9		Maga Nevares de Rosselló	Pedro Rosselló	January 2, 1993	January 2, 2001	Living	Maga Nevares is also the mother of former Governor Ricardo Rosselló (2017–2019)
10		Adolfo Krans	Sila Calderón	January 2, 2001	August 2001	Living	Governor Sila María Calderón was married to Adolfo Krans, a businessman and insurance broker, when she took office in 2001. Krans and Calderón had campaigned together throughout the 2000 gubernatorial election. However, rumors of a potential split began circulating in political circles for several weeks. On Friday, August 17, 2001, Governor Calderón announced that she would seek a divorce to end the 23-year marriage. Their divorce was finalized in November 2001.
10 (continued)		Sila María González Calderón and María Elena González Calderón	Sila Calderón	2001	September 10, 2003		Governor Sila María Calderón appointed her daughters, Sila María González Calderón and María Elena González Calderón, to fulfill the duties of the first lady after her divorce.
10 (continued)		Ramón Cantero Frau and Sila María González Calderón and María Elena González Calderón	Sila Calderón	September 10, 2003	January 2, 2005		Ramón Cantero Frau had previously served as Secretary of Economic Development and Commerce of Puerto Rico within Governor Calderón's Cabinet from January 2001 until his resignation in December 2002. In August 2003, Governor Calderón and Cantero announced their engagement. Calderón and Cantero Fray married on September 10, 2003, at a ceremony at La Fortaleza. It was the third marriage for both Calderón and Cantero Frau. The couple divorced in 2005 after she left office.
11		Luisa Gándara	Aníbal Acevedo Vilá	January 2, 2005	January 2, 2009	June 14, 2023 (69)	Nicknamed Piti Gándara, she was elected as an at-large member of the House of Representatives of Puerto Rico in March 2013. Gándara served in the House as a member of the Popular Democratic Party (PPD) from 2013 to 2017.
12		Lucé Vela	Luis Fortuño	January 2, 2009	January 2, 2013	Living	Married to Fortuño since August 3, 1984
13		Wilma Pastrana	Alejandro García Padilla	January 2, 2013	January 2, 2017	Living	Married to Alejandro García Padilla since April 7, 2001
	Beatriz Rosselló	Ricardo Rosselló	January 2, 2017	August 2, 2019	Living	Beatriz Rosselló's tenure as first lady ended on August 2, 2019, when Governor Ricardo Rosselló resigned from office in the wake of the Telegramgate political scandal.	
14		Vacant	Pedro Pierluisi (De facto)	August 2, 2019	August 7, 2019		Pedro Pierluisi and his wife, María Elena Carrión, were undergoing a divorce at the time of his brief, five day tenure. When Pierluisi took office, he announced that there would be no first lady and that his administration would consider closing the Office of the First Lady. The Supreme Court of Puerto Rico unanimously ruled that Pierluisi's inauguration was unconstitutional on August 7, 2019, and he vacated the office.
15		Jorge Díaz Reverón	Wanda Vázquez Garced	August 7, 2019	January 2, 2021	Living	Jorge Díaz Reverón is a superior court judge in the city of Caguas, Puerto Rico.
16		Caridad Pierluisi	Pedro Pierluisi	January 2, 2021	December 8, 2024	Living	Governor Pedro Pierluisi assigned his sister Caridad Pierluisi the post of First Lady.
16 (continued)		Fabiola Ansótegui	Pedro Pierluisi	December 8, 2024	January 2, 2025	Living	Governor Pedro Pierluisi and Ansótegui were married on December 8, 2024 in a private ceremony at La Fortaleza.
17		José Yovin Vargas	Jenniffer González-Colón	January 2, 2025	Present	Living	Married to Jenniffer Gonzalez Colon since August 6, 2022.

== See also ==
- Governor of Puerto Rico
- List of governors of Puerto Rico
