= Waldemar Volmar Méndez =

Puerto Rican politician

Secretary of Sports and Recreation of Puerto Rico
- In office January 2, 2017 – January 2, 2018
- Governor: Ricardo Rosselló
- Preceded by: Ramón Orta
- Succeeded by: Adriana Sánchez Parés

Personal details
- Born: Andrés Waldemar Volmar Méndez; March 9, 1989 (age 37) Bayamón, Puerto Rico
- Party: New Progressive Party
- Education: University of Puerto Rico (BSS); Universidad Metropolitana (BFA MBA)

Andrés Waldemar Volmar Méndez (born March 9, 1989) was a Puerto Rican politician and public servant for the New Progressive Party (PNP). He served as the Secretary of Sports and Recreation of Puerto Rico from 2017 to 2018, under Governor Ricardo Rosselló. Volmar ran for mayor of his hometown of Dorado, Puerto Rico on the 2020 Puerto Rican general election, but was defeated by the incumbent Carlos López Rivera. He was the host of La Bóveda de TeleOnce.

== Early career ==
Volmar Méndez was one of the singers of the Roberto Roena orchestra, Apollo Sound. He also presided the ASSMCA National Young Leaders group, which promotes drug prevention through arts, recreation, and sports. In 2008, Volmar received an award from the Government of Puerto Rico for his work as a leader in recreation in his community. Earned a Bachelor's Degree in Labor Relations with a concentration in Science Policies of the University of Puerto Rico. A year later, for the In 2014, she obtained a Bachelor's Degree in Drama with a concentration in Acting. Then for the year 2016 he obtained the degree of Master of Business Administration from Universidad Metropolitana of the Ana G. Méndez System.

== Political career ==
In 2016, Volmar Méndez presented his intentions to run for Mayor of his hometown of Dorado, Puerto Rico. He faced Melinda Romero Donnelly, daughter of former Puerto Rico Governor Carlos Romero Barceló, in a primary, winning by a margin of 56.4–43.6. However, Volmar was defeated at the 2016 elections by the incumbent Carlos López Rivera.

In December 2016, Governor-elect Ricardo Rosselló appointed Volmar Méndez as Secretary of Sports and Recreation of Puerto Rico. He was confirmed by the Senate of Puerto Rico in March 2017. During his tenure, Volmar was criticized by recreation leaders for strict budget cuts to numerous sports and athletics programs. He was also criticized by Henry Neumann, a member of his party and former Secretary of Sports and Recreation, as well as his former opponent in Dorado, Carlos López Rivera. In January 2018, Volmar abruptly resigned, citing personal reasons.

After resigning, Volmar briefly retook his musical career. However, in 2019 he announced his intentions to run for mayor of Dorado again and received the support of then-Governor Ricardo Rosselló.
