= Governor Rosselló =

Governor Rosselló may refer to:

- Pedro Rosselló (born 1944), Governor of Puerto Rico from 1993 to 2001
- Ricardo Rosselló (born 1979), Governor of Puerto Rico from 2017 to 2019; son of Pedro
