= Maga Nevares de Rosselló =

First Lady of Puerto Rico

9th First Lady of Puerto Rico
- In role January 2, 1993 - January 2, 2001
- Governor: Pedro Rosselló
- Preceded by: Lila Mayoral
- Succeeded by: Sila María and María Elena González Calderón

Personal details
- Born: Irma Margarita Nevares Padilla; December 7, 1948 (age 76); San Juan, Puerto Rico
- Spouse: Pedro Rosselló (m. 1969)
- Children: 3, including Ricardo
- Website: bmgpr.org/primera-dama

Irma Margarita "Maga" Nevares Padilla (born December 7, 1948) is married to the former Governor of Puerto Rico Pedro Rosselló and also the mother of former Governor of Puerto Rico, Ricardo Rosselló. She served as First Lady from 1993 to 2001.

== Early life ==
Nevares is the daughter of Oscar Nevares del Valle and Irma Padilla. The Nevares direct line goes back to Asturias, Spain. Graduated from high school at Colegio San Antonio in San Juan.

Nevares married Pedro Rosselló on August 9, 1969. They had three children: Juan Oscar (b. 1971), Luis Roberto (b. 1973), and Ricardo (b. 1979). Nevares de Rossello is also the aunt in law of former Menudo member and international singer Roy Rossello.

== Later life ==
Nevares and her husband live in Dorado, near Dorado Beach. On July 23, 2019 police in Puerto Rico had to provide extra security to their residence and neighborhood due to protesters calling for their son to resign as governor of Puerto Rico.

== See also ==
- Telegramgate
