= Zoraida Buxó =

Puerto Rican politician (born 1953)

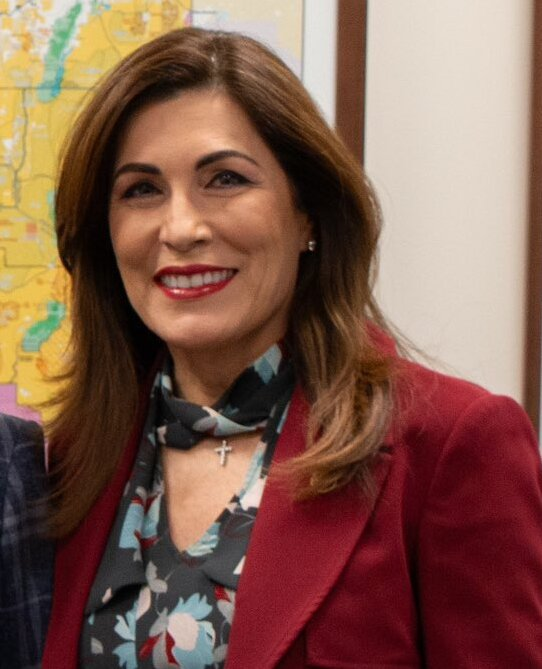

United States Shadow Senator from Puerto Rico
- In office July 1, 2021 – December 31, 2024
- Preceded by: Carlos Romero Barceló
- Succeeded by: Vacant

Secretary of Department of Corrections and Rehabilitation
- In office 1993–1995
- Governor: Pedro Rosselló
- Preceded by: Mercedes Otero
- Succeeded by: Nydia Cotto Vives

Personal details
- Born: 1963 (age 62–63) San Juan, Puerto Rico
- Party: Republican
- Education: University of Puerto Rico, Río Piedras (BBA, JD); George Washington University (LLM)

Zoraida Buxó Santiago (born 1963) is a Puerto Rican politician who served as a Shadow United States Senator.

== Early life and education ==
Buxó was born in Puerto Rico in 1963. Completed a BA in Business Administration from the University of Puerto Rico. She received a master's degree in law from George Washington University Law School and a J.D. from the University of Puerto Rico School of Law.

== Career ==
Buxó career experience includes working as a lawyer and in leadership roles with non-governmental organizations. in 1993 she worked as a legal advisor for public safety for the Governors of Puerto Rico office. Served as Secretary of the Puerto Rico Department of Corrections and Rehabilitation from 1993 to 1995. She also worked in the office of the Governor of Puerto Rico and was a board member of the University of Puerto Rico.

In 2021, Buxó ran in the special election for U.S. Senate shadow delegates representing Puerto Rico. She won the special general election on May 16, 2021, with 46,222 votes (27.35% of the vote) and assumed office July 1, 2021. Her term ended on December 31, 2024.

As a shadow Senator, Buxó advocated for the enforcement of the results of the 2020 status referendum by the U.S. Congress and the admission of Puerto Rico as the 51st state of the Union.

On October 29, 2024, Buxó endorsed Donald Trump at a campaign rally in Allentown, Pennsylvania.

U.S. Senate
Preceded by Carlos Romero Barceló	U.S. Shadow Senator (Seat 2) from Puerto Rico; 2021–2025; Served alongside: Melinda Romero Donnelly	Vacant
