= Lucé Vela =

First Lady of Puerto Rico

12th First Lady of Puerto Rico
- In role January 2, 2009 – January 2, 2013
- Governor: Luis Fortuño
- Preceded by: Luisa Gándara
- Succeeded by: Wilma Pastrana

Personal details
- Born: Luz Eufemia Vela Gutiérrez; May 24, 1961 (age 65) San Juan, Puerto Rico
- Education: Goucher College (B.A.); Interamerican University of Puerto Rico School of Law (JD)
- Profession: Attorney; public notary

Luz Eufemia Vela Gutiérrez, better known as Lucé Vela, (born 24 May 1961) married former Governor of Puerto Rico Luis Fortuño. She was the First Lady from 2009 to 2013.

== Education and personal life ==
Lucé Vela was born in San Juan, Puerto Rico, in 1961.

Vela obtained a Bachelor of Arts in Communications with a minor concentration in French from Goucher College in Baltimore. She later obtained a Juris Doctor degree from the Inter American University of Puerto Rico School of Law.

Vela and Fortuño parented triplets.

== Professional career ==
Vela first commenced her legal career working for the Law Firm of Martínez, Odell, & Calabria. In 2000, she established her own private practice, specializing in real estate and as a notary public.

== First Lady of Puerto Rico ==
Vela began her tenure as First Lady of Puerto Rico after Fortuño was sworn in as Governor in 2009, following the 2008 general elections. Her charitable work involved education, family values, and women's health.

== Notes ==
Honorary titles
Preceded by Luisa Gándara	First Lady of Puerto Rico; 2009–2013	Succeeded by Wilma Pastrana
