= Puerto Rico Office for Socioeconomic and Community Development =

Government agency in Puerto Rico

- Oficina para el Desarrollo Socioeconómico y Comunitario de Puerto Rico (ODSEC)

State Government Agency overview
- Formed: February 9, 2017; 9 years ago
- Preceding agencies: Oficina del Coordinador General para el Financiamiento Social y la Autogestión (OFSA); Office of the Commissioner for Municipal Affairs (OCAM)
- Jurisdiction: Puerto Rico
- Headquarters: San Juan, Puerto Rico
- Employees: 52
- Annual budget: $46million
- State Government Agency executive: Roberto Lefranc Fortuño, Executive Director

The Puerto Rico Office for Socioeconomic and Community Development (Spanish: Oficina para el Desarrollo Socioeconómico y Comunitario de Puerto Rico (ODSEC)) is a government agency of Puerto Rico that manages projects to improve and develop "Special Communities of Puerto Rico" (Spanish: Comunidades Especiales de Puerto Rico). The agency works with other government agencies, as well as with community members, to improve the infrastructure and economic opportunities of marginalized communities. Its original founding was in 2001 with Law 1-2001 passed by Governor Sila María Calderón. The new entity, employing some of the same people it had under a preceding office, is now responsible for "administering disaster funding".

== OFSA and OCAM ==
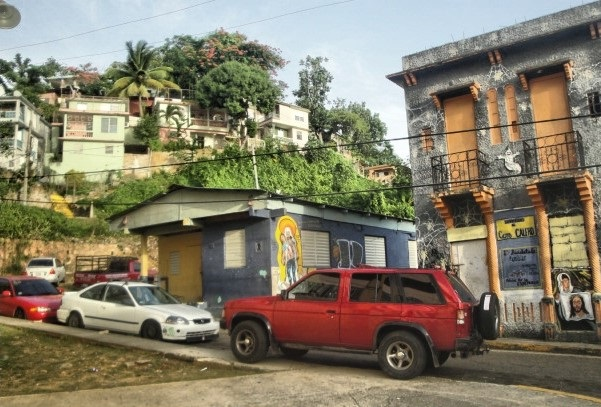
Los Cerros in Aguadilla is on the list of "Special Communities".

Law 1-2001, passed on March 1, 2001 created the Oficina del Coordinador General para el Financiamiento Social y la Autogestión (OFSA), with a mission to eradicate poverty in Puerto Rico. With it, "Special Communities" (Comunidades Especiales de Puerto Rico) across Puerto Rico were to be identified and then residents' voices were to be included in the plans for how to improve same. Community members were to become leaders who would spearhead needed socioeconomic changes within their communities.

The Oficina del Comisionado de Asuntos Municipales (OCAM) was a similar agency which had helped municipalities with funding for specific community needs but had been eliminated in 2017. When OCAM was dissolved, many of its functions were taken over by ODSEC. In a final audit of OCAM, by the Puerto Rico comptroller, who looked at OCAM's operations from 2021-2017, the auditor found that OCAM had performed its functions correctly and lawfully.

== Special Communities ==
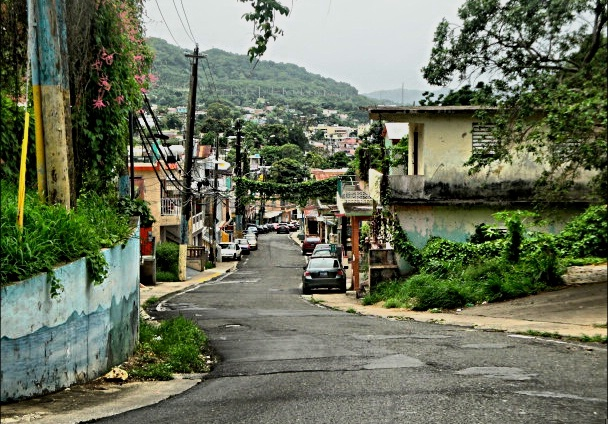
Cuesta Vieja in Aguadilla is on the list of "Special Communities".

Special Communities are 742 places in Puerto Rico which were identified as marginalized and needing attention. Established by Sila María Calderón, the eighth governor of Puerto Rico, the idea was to identify and address the high levels of poverty, and lack of resources and opportunities affecting these communities in Puerto Rico. First, there were 686 sectors, neighborhoods and barrios on the list and by 2008 there were 742 places identified as a "Special Community".

The OFSA agency, as it was then called, believed in solving poverty through a model that involved all community residents, the private sector and government agencies, working together to solve community problems. In 2016, with a small budget of US$3.761 million, the mission remained the same; to create sustainable development, and empower people to work together on improving infrastructure, housing and the social fabric of their communities.

== ODSEC ==
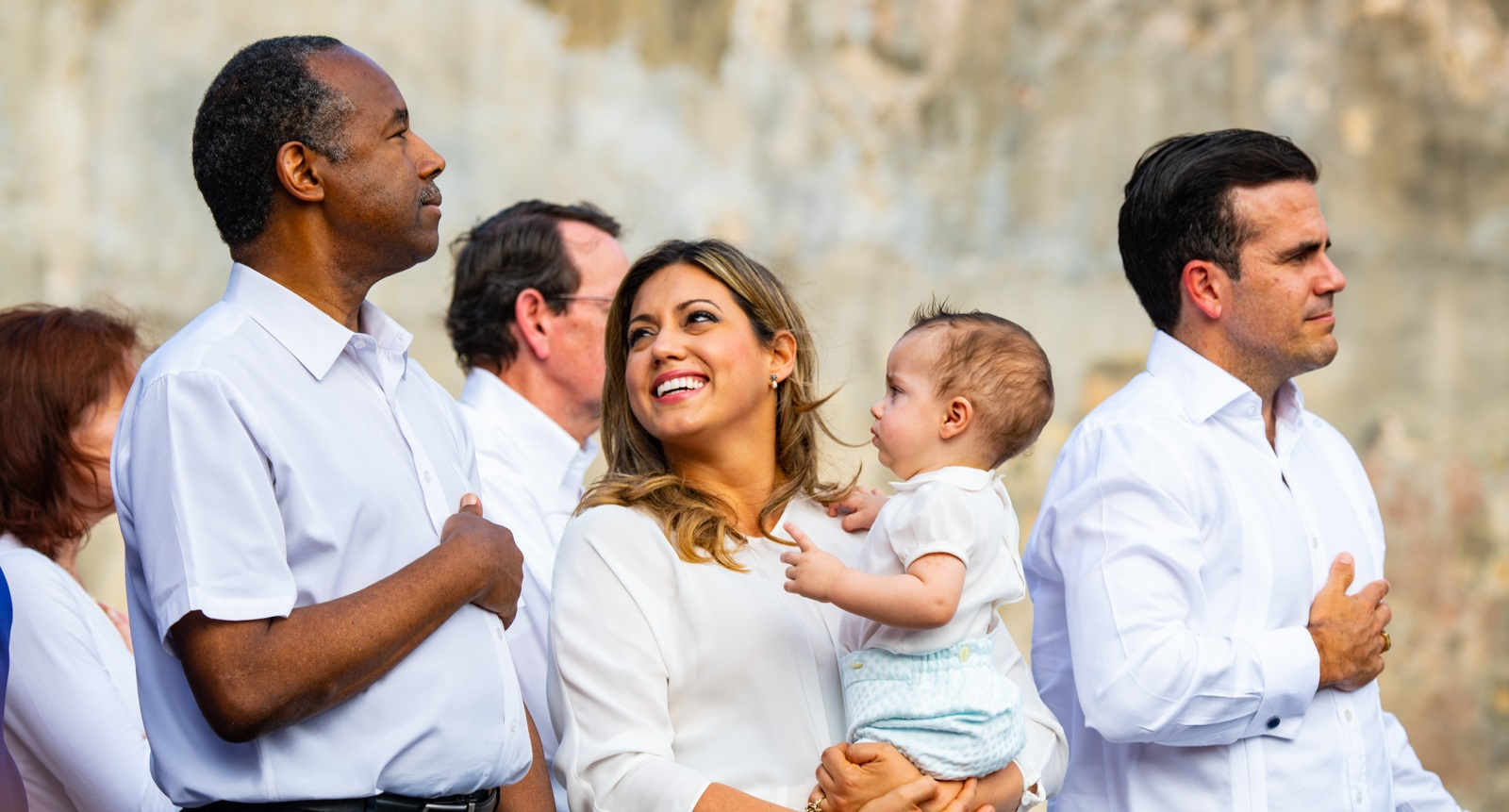
HUD Secretary Ben Carson visits Puerto Rico on the 1-year anniversary of Hurricane Maria.

Despite the Office of Management and Budget (in Spanish, la Oficina de Gerencia y Presupuesto) recommending the repeal of the original law which created the "Special Communities of Puerto Rico" (Comunidades especiales de Puerto Rico), in early 2017, Governor Ricardo Rosselló created the new government agency, ODSEC, to continue the work which had been started with law 1-2001, and to continue the "Special Communities of Puerto Rico" initiative. Jesús Vélez Vargas, its director stated that the program was evolving with more streamlined ways to bring help to these marginalized communities.

In October 2017, a month after Hurricane Maria devastated Puerto Rico's infrastructure, $41.2 million in federal funds was earmarked for The Puerto Rico Office for Socioeconomic and Community Development (ODSEC) with a mandate that the funds be distributed, for infrastructure work, to municipalities with over 50,000 inhabitants. The new entity, employing some of the same people it had under a preceding office, is now responsible for "administering disaster funding".

== Projects ==
In 2019, Puerto Rico Department of Transportation and Public Works (DTOP) and Puerto Rico Department of Housing projects had been funded for Special Communities in Barceloneta, Loíza, Hormigueros, and Humacao.

In June 2019, Ricardo Rosello announced that $2 million had been appropriated to the ODSEC for construction of new roofs. The total number of homes that could receive new roofs was 180, of the 20,000 to 30,000 homes still missing roofs since Hurricane Maria hit Puerto Rico on September 20, 2017.

== See also ==
- Urban planning in the United States
- List of communities in Puerto Rico
- Bravo Family Foundation
