= Jorge Díaz Reverón =

American judge

First Gentleman of Puerto Rico
- In role August 7, 2019 – January 2, 2021
- Governor: Wanda Vázquez Garced
- Preceded by: Beatriz Rosselló (de jure); Vacant (de facto)
- Succeeded by: Vacant

Personal details
- Born: June 1, 1960 (age 66) Caguas, Puerto Rico
- Spouse: Wanda Vázquez Garced
- Children: Jorge Álvaro Díaz Rodríguez (alias Alvarito Díaz), Beatriz Díaz Vázquez y Stephanie Díaz Vázquez
- Education: Interamerican University of Puerto Rico School of Law (J.D.)
- Profession: Judge

Jorge Díaz Reverón is a Puerto Rican judge. He was the first First Gentleman of Puerto Rico and the husband of Wanda Vázquez Garced. At the time, Díaz Reverón served as a superior court judge in Caguas.

== Career ==
Díaz Reverón graduated in 1987 from the Interamerican University of Puerto Rico School of Law. He began serving as a judge in December 2009 under the administration of Governor Luis Fortuño. He was a superior court trial judge in criminal matters at Caguas, Puerto Rico.

In December 2018, amid concerns of unlawful intervention on behalf of his wife, then Attorney General Wanda Vázquez Garced, Díaz Reverón was removed from the chamber. The Chief Justice of the Supreme Court of Puerto Rico, ordered an investigation based on judicial ethical concerns which later found no probable cause.

He became the first First Gentleman of Puerto Rico on August 7, 2019. In 2021 governor Pedro Pierluisi ascended him to an appeals court a move which his wife had considered while she was governor.

== Personal life ==
Díaz Reverón is married to politician and attorney Wanda Vázquez Garced. They have two daughters. From August 7, 2019 until January 2, 2021, they resided in La Fortaleza, the official mansion residence of the Governor of Puerto Rico.

== See also ==
- List of first gentlemen in the United States
