= Kate de Romero =

First Lady of Puerto Rico (1937–2023)

7th First Lady of Puerto Rico
- In role January 2, 1977 – January 2, 1985
- Governor: Carlos Romero Barceló
- Preceded by: Lila Mayoral
- Succeeded by: Lila Mayoral

First Lady of San Juan, Puerto Rico
- In role January 10, 1969 – January 2, 1977
- Preceded by: Genaro A. Gautier
- Succeeded by: Nancy Méndez

Personal details
- Born: Kathleen Donnelly; 1937 Baldwin, Nassau County, New York, U.S.
- Died: September 18, 2023 (aged 86) New Braunfels, Texas
- Spouse: Carlos Romero Barceló
- Children: Juan Carlos; Melinda

Kathleen de Romero (née Donnelly; 1937 – September 18, 2023), also known as Doña Kate and Kate Romero, was the wife of Puerto Rico Governor Carlos Romero Barceló and served as First Lady of Puerto Rico from 1977 to 1985. She also served as a Trustee of the Conservation Trust of Puerto Rico from 1999 to 2008.

== Biography ==
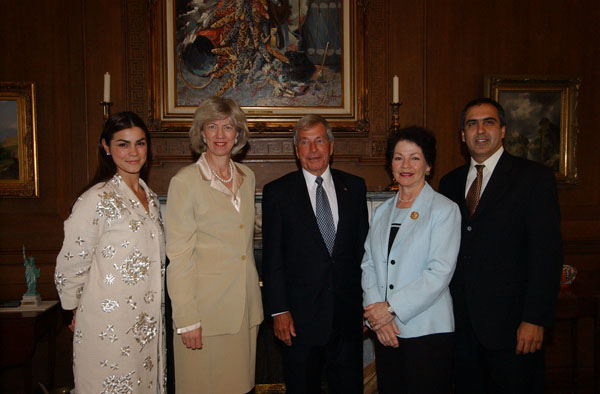
U.S. Interior Secretary Gale Norton (second from left) and members of the Conservation Trust of Puerto Rico in 2005. Romero is second from right.

Romero was born as Kathleen Donnelly in Baldwin, a hamlet on New York's Long Island.

While working as a secretary in Manhattan, de Romero went on vacation to Puerto Rico and became interested in living there. After a second vacation, she got a telephone book for Puerto Rico and sent letters to 35 companies to ask about a job. Only two companies replied to her letters, including the San Juan branch of the First National City Bank. She was invited for an interview and traveled back to Puerto Rico, after which she was hired.

Several years later, while living in Puerto Rico, de Romero met lawyer Carlos Romero Barceló and they got married 18 months later, in 1966. Romero Barceló became the first elected Mayor of San Juan in 1969 and in 1976 he was elected Governor of Puerto Rico, making Romero the capital city's and the island's First Lady. They had two children, Juan Carlos and Melinda, who has served as commonwealth senator and representative and as well has been elected as a member of Puerto Rico's "shadow" congressional delegation.

While serving as First Lady, de Romero advocated for the disabled, the elderly, and better education. She supported the movement to grant statehood to Puerto Rico. She also wrote a cookbook with her favorite recipes, "Cocinando desde La Fortaleza", the proceeds of which were donated entirely to charity.

In 1999, de Romero was appointed to the board of trustees of the Conservation Trust of Puerto Rico. She was reappointed to a second, three-year term in 2005. During her term, she supported issues relating to the environment, the arts, the rights of the disabled, parks, children's causes, education, and Puerto Rico's cultural, historic and artistic heritage.

== Death ==
Kate de Romero died on September 18, 2023, at the age of 86.

Honorary titles
Preceded by Lila Mayoral Wirshing	First Lady of Puerto Rico; 1977–1985	Succeeded by Lila Mayoral Wirshing
