= Lila Mayoral Wirshing =

First Lady of Puerto Rico

8th and 10th First Lady of Puerto Rico
- In role 2 January 1973 – 2 January 1977
- Governor: Rafael Hernández Colón
- Preceded by: Rosario Ferré
- Succeeded by: Kate Donnelly
- In role 2 January 1985 – 2 January 1993
- Preceded by: Kate Donnelly
- Succeeded by: Irma Margarita Neváres

Personal details
- Born: Lila María Mercedes Mayoral Wirshing; 5 December 1942 Ponce, Puerto Rico
- Died: 7 January 2003 (aged 60) Ponce, Puerto Rico
- Resting place: Cementerio Católico San Vicente de Paul
- Spouse: Rafael Hernández Colón (m. 1959)
- Relations: Pablo Hernández Rivera (grandson)
- Children: Rafael; José Alfredo; Dora Mercedes; Juan Eugenio (b. 1969)
- Education: Universidad del Sagrado Corazón (BBA)

Lila María Mercedes Mayoral Wirshing (12 May 1942 – 7 January 2003) was the wife of the Governor of Puerto Rico Rafael Hernández Colón, and was First Lady during his three terms as governor (1973–1977, 1985–1993).

== Early years and marriage ==
Lila María Mercedes Mayoral Wirshing was born in Ponce, Puerto Rico, in 1942. Her parents were Juan Eugenio Mayoral Renovales (1906–1967), an industrialist, founder and president of Ponce Candy Industries, and Julita Wirshing Serrallés, who was the daughter of Herman Wirshing, a German immigrant to Puerto Rico. Her paternal grandparents were Joaquin Mayoral Montalvo (1878–1911), who was born and died in Ponce, and Maria Renovales Rodriguez (1879–1964), who was born in Ponce and died in Caracas, Venezuela. She was the second of four sisters: Julita Mercedes, Ana Inés and Eugenia. She began her studies at the Liceo Ponceño in Ponce, and finished high school at the Dana Hall School in Wellesley, Massachusetts.

During this time, she met Rafael Hernández Colón, who was a young law student. Mayoral Wirshing and Hernández Colón married on 24 October 1959. They had four children: Rafael, José Alfredo, Dora Mercedes and Juan Eugenio.

== First Lady of Puerto Rico: 1973–1977 ==
Lila Mayoral became First Lady of Puerto Rico when her husband was elected Governor in the 1972 general elections. She remained in the position until he lost the 1976 elections. As first lady, she distinguished herself for her dedication to the community. For example, after Hurricane Eloise caused significant damage in Puerto Rico, Mayoral organized a benefit concert to aid those affected by the storm.

== Return to private life and college: 1977–1984 ==
After her husband was defeated in his bid for another term in La Fortaleza, Mayoral Wirshing returned to college to finish her degree. She received a bachelor's degree in business management from the Universidad del Sagrado Corazón in 1982, graduating summa cum laude with a 4.00 GPA.

== Return to La Fortaleza: 1985–1993 ==
Mayoral became the First Lady again when Hernández Colón was re-elected in 1984. The next year, after the Mameyes Landslide in Ponce, Mayoral convinced the government to build concrete homes for the victims instead of relocating them into new wood-frame homes. Also, after Hurricane Hugo affected the island, Mayoral acted as liaison between the government and the community to synchronize fund-raising efforts to help the victims of that storm. She was president of the board of directors of Dale la Mano a Puerto Rico, a public-private partnership that organized a marathon which raised $15.6 million in help funds.

Mayoral led a school anti-drug campaign called "Abre tus ojos a un mundo sin drogas" (Open your eyes to a world without drugs). The campaign encouraged students to create artwork that revolved around anti-drug themes. Several celebrities, including José Miguel Agrelot, Ednita Nazario and Dagmar participated in the campaign, giving awards and gifts to the winners. She also led reforestation efforts in the island, particularly along roadways and in schools.

== Later years and death ==
After her retirement from public life, Mayoral continued working on several projects, including Centro San Francisco in Ponce and the construction of a sanctuary for the Virgin Mary (Lumen Dei Union) in Orocovis. Mayoral died on 7 January 2003, aged 60, of colon cancer. She was interred at Cementerio Católico San Vicente de Paul in Ponce.

== Accolades ==
A school in Barrio Canas, Sector El Tuque in Ponce was named in her honor. The building housing the headquarters of the Puerto Rico Department of Family Affairs in San Juan, Puerto Rico, is also named after her.

== Honors and awards ==
Mayoral received numerous awards and honors during her lifetime, including:

- 1971: Young Mother of the Year
- 1973: Woman of the Year, receiving the plaque from Mayor of New York City John Lindsay
- 1975: Distinguished Woman from the Chamber of Commerce
- 1985: Honorary Member of the Commission of Businesswomen
- 1987: Recognition from the Philadelphia Council of Hispanic Organizations
- 1990: Recognition from the Federal Emergency Management Agency for her efforts after Hurricane Hugo
- 1991: Honorary Member of the Westchester Hispanic Chamber of Commerce, Inc.
- 1992: Honorary Doctorate in Social Work from University of Aruba

== See also ==
- List of Puerto Ricans
- German immigration to Puerto Rico

Honorary titles
Preceded by Rosario Ferré	First Lady of Puerto Rico; 1973–1977	Succeeded by Kate de Romero
Preceded by Kate de Romero	First Lady of Puerto Rico; 1985–1993	Succeeded by Maga Nevares de Rosselló
