= Melinda Romero Donnelly =

Puerto Rican politician

Melinda Romero

United States Shadow Senator from Puerto Rico
- In office July 1, 2021 – December 31, 2024
- Preceded by: Zoraida Fonalledas
- Succeeded by: Vacant

Member of the Puerto Rico Senate from the at-large district
- In office June 15, 2009 – January 1, 2013
- Preceded by: Jorge de Castro Font

Member of the Puerto Rico House of Representatives from the 1st district
- In office 1997–2004
- Preceded by: Benjamín Vélez
- Succeeded by: Nuno López

Personal details
- Born: Melinda Kathleen Romero Donnelly; October 8, 1971 (age 54) San Juan, Puerto Rico, U.S.
- Party: New Progressive
- Other political affiliations: Democratic
- Children: 2
- Relatives: Carlos Romero Barceló (father); Kate de Romero (mother)
- Education: Interamerican University, San Germán (BBA, MA)

Melinda Kathleen Romero Donnelly (born October 8, 1971) is a Puerto Rican politician, and former senator and Representative for the New Progressive Party (PNP). She is the youngest daughter of former Governor of Puerto Rico Carlos Romero Barceló and Kate de Romero. During a break from her political career, Romero worked as a journalist for the Caribbean Business newspaper.

== Early years ==
Melinda Romero was born on October 8, 1971, to then-mayor of San Juan and future Governor of Puerto Rico, Carlos Romero Barceló, and Kate Donnelly. Her great-grandfather is Antonio R. Barceló, first President of the Senate of Puerto Rico. She is the youngest of four siblings.

In 1993, Melinda Romero was selected vice-president of the Youth Organization of the New Progressive Party (PNP) in San Juan.

== Political career ==
=== Representative (1995-2004) ===
In 1995, Melinda Romero ran for Representative and won the primary for District 1. She was elected in the 1996 general elections with a 53.8% of the votes. After being sworn in, she took over the Commission of Youth Affairs and Public Safety, San Juan Development, and Legislative Internships.

While serving as a representative, Romero also ran for President of the PNP Youth Organization in 1998, being the first legislator to occupy that position. For the 2000 general elections, she presented her candidacy for Representative At-Large and ended up being the representative with most votes among her fellow PNP candidates, and the second one with most votes among all candidates.

In 2003, she decided not to seek reelection due to personal and health problems. Aside of her health, Romero decided to spend more time with her children in the wake of her divorce.

=== Senator (2009-2013) ===
In 2008, Romero sought the vacancy left by Jorge de Castro Font in the Senate of Puerto Rico. She received the support of several leaders of the party, namely Representative Albita Rivera, and Mayor of Toa Baja and vice-president of the Mayors Federation, Aníbal Vega Borges. After an internal process, Romero Donnelly was chosen for the seat. She was sworn in on June 15, 2009, in a ceremony in the Rotunda of the Capitol of Puerto Rico.

In 2012, Romero won another PNP primary being the third candidate for the Senate with most votes. However, she was defeated in the general elections of 2012.

== Return to private life ==
After leaving her seat, Romero started working as a journalist for the Caribbean Business. In an interview, she said she would cover news related to the Legislature and municipalities.

In 2014, Romero announced her intentions of running for mayor of her hometown of Dorado. However, she was defeated in the 2016 primaries by Waldemar Volmar Méndez.

== Personal life ==
Melinda Romero has been married twice. She had two children with second husband, William Fuentes: Kathleen Nicole (born March 28, 1998) and Christopher Alexander (born August 28, 2000). She separated from Fuentes in March 2002, and the couple was divorced in June 2003.

In 2002, she and her son, Christopher, presented health issues that prevented her from attending her job. She was originally diagnosed with viral meningitis, but the diagnose was later changed to encephalitis. After tests were done at the University of Johns Hopkins Hospital, doctors recommended that she submit to treatment for pain control. The symptoms of her illness were painful headaches and disorientation.

Health issues forced her to not seek reelection for her position as member of the Puerto Rico House of Representatives in 2004. She instead dedicated time to improve her health and spend more time with her family.

U.S. Senate
Preceded by Zoraida Fonalledas	U.S. Shadow Senator (Seat 1) from Puerto Rico; 2021–2025; Served alongside: Zoraida Buxó	Vacant
House of Representatives of Puerto Rico
Preceded by Benjamín Vélez	Member of the Puerto Rico House of Representatives from the 1th district 1997–2004	Succeeded by Nuno López
