= Beatriz Rosselló =

Puerto Rican politician

Beatriz Isabel Rosselló

14th First Lady of Puerto Rico
- In role January 2, 2017 – August 2, 2019
- Governor: Ricardo Rosselló
- Preceded by: Wilma Pastrana
- Succeeded by: Jorge Díaz Reverón

Personal details
- Born: Beatriz Isabel Areizaga; January 4, 1985 (age 41) San Juan, Puerto Rico
- Party: New Progressive Party of Puerto Rico
- Spouse: Ricardo Rosselló (m. 2012)
- Children: 2
- Education: Interamerican University of Puerto Rico (BA); Georgetown University (MA)

Beatriz Isabel Areizaga (born January 4, 1985), aka Beatriz Rosselló, is the wife of Ricardo Rosselló, the former Governor of Puerto Rico. From January 2017 to August 2019, she served as First Lady of Puerto Rico and was recognized for her humanitarian work. Professionally, Areizaga is a real estate broker, public relations specialist, public art expert, and civil rights advocate

== Personal life ==
Beatriz Rosselló was born in San Juan, Puerto Rico. She advocated for the arts and initiatives to help those in need, including programs addressing homelessness and foster care. Areizaga married Ricardo Rosselló on October 14, 2012, in a ceremony in New Orleans, Louisiana. The couple have two children: Claudia Beatriz and Pedro Javier.

== Early life and education ==
Rosselló studied at the Julián Blanco School, which specializes in ballet. She attended college at the Interamerican University of Puerto Rico.

She completed her bachelor's degree in psychology at the Interamerican University of Puerto Rico, where she graduated magna cum laude. She was elected student council president, making her the youngest person and only the second woman to hold the role. Rosselló also pursued post-graduate studies at the Sanford School of Public Policy at Duke University in North Carolina. Beatriz is also a Georgetown alum who completed a graduate degree in Arts and Museum Studies.

== Early career ==
Rosselló was the chapter president of the Puerto Rico Statehood Students Association at the Inter-American University of Puerto Rico and vice president of the New Progressive Party of Puerto Rico's youth group in San Juan.

== Tenure as first lady ==
Beatriz Rosselló created and led initiatives such as Fortaleza Para Ti, Back To School, Women's Council, Unidos por Puerto Rico, and Spayathon for Puerto Rico. As First Lady, she commissioned a monument of diversity painted with the colors representing the LGBTTIQ+ community flag called "Portico de la Igualdad" in June 2019.

In 2017, Beatriz Rosselló launched Fortaleza Para Ti, a program that supported communities in need by helping repair recreational areas, homes, schools, and small businesses after the devastating impact of Hurricane Maria. The program also used public art to encourage community pride and economic activity. That same year, she started the Back to School initiative, which provided backpacks with school supplies to students, especially those affected by the hurricane. The program continued for three years, helping children across the island prepare for the school year. Another initiative in 2017, Love for Our Own, Adopt a Nursing Home, began with the delivery of hot meals to the Emiliano Pol nursing home in Río Piedras. The effort grew into a larger program that provided more than 1,500 meals a day to 83 nursing homes around the island.

Rosselló also worked with the Women’s Council, a group made up of legislators and nonprofit organizations, to address violence against women. The council focused on raising awareness, offering support services, and improving coordination between government agencies and community groups. In 2018, she organized the Animal Welfare Summit in partnership with veterinarians, the Humane Society, and rescue organizations. She also launched Spayathon for Puerto Rico, a large-scale spay and neuter campaign to help control the population of stray animals. This effort was recognized by the Clinton Global Initiative. Also, Beatriz Rosselló introduced Stop Bullying Puerto Rico, a campaign to raise awareness about bullying in schools and communities. It included short videos made with the help of government agencies, celebrities, and athletes to promote kindness and prevent emotional harm to children and teens.

Beatriz Rosselló led Adopt a Park and Unite a Family program, created recreational areas at the Women’s Rehabilitation Correctional Center to give children visiting their mothers a more welcoming environment. She also launched the Casa Mia Project, which aimed to support working families by converting repossessed homes into affordable housing.

In 2019, Rosselló hosted the Leadership Convention for School Directors in Puerto Rico, which offered workshops and training to help school leaders improve their management and leadership skills. In the same year, she introduced Maletín Empresarial para la Mujer, a digital platform offering online courses and practical tools for starting and managing small and medium-sized businesses. The program included resources on business planning and market research to empower more women to become entrepreneurs.

Rosselló supported a long-term effort to revitalize the ports of San Juan Bay and led the restoration of Museo Casa Blanca, a 16th-century home in Old San Juan. The museum was reopened to the public for tours and events.

== Unidos por Puerto Rico ==
Beatriz initiated Unidos for Puerto Rico as an effort to get much-needed aid to the Island after Hurricanes Irma and Maria. Her role was as a spokesperson, not as an administrator. Unidos for Puerto Rico was managed by a board of local entrepreneurs. In July 2019, Beatriz Rosselló faced criticism related to the management of disaster relief trailers, with some accusing her of delaying the distribution of supplies; however, Unidos por Puerto Rico, the organization she led, stated it had no knowledge of the abandoned trailers found in 2018 and was not involved with them. While these claims drew public attention, her humanitarian efforts through Unidos por Puerto Rico were widely acknowledged for their impact. The initiative supported 192 nonprofit organizations, carried out 220 relief projects, and helped over 1.5 million people across Puerto Rico. In the aftermath of Hurricanes Irma and Maria, Rosselló and her family were involved in delivering hundreds of tons of food and essential supplies.
