= Víctor David Loubriel =

Puerto Rican politician

Member 23rd Senate of Puerto Rico
- In office January 2, 2005 – January 4, 2005
- Succeeded by: Pedro Rosselló

Personal details
- Party: New Progressive Party (PNP)
- Profession: Politician

Víctor David Loubriel Ortiz is a Puerto Rican politician and former member of the Senate of Puerto Rico for the New Progressive Party (PNP).

Loubriel presented his candidacy for the Senate of Puerto Rico before 2004. He ran for a candidate slot in the 2003 primaries obtaining the most votes in his district (Arecibo).

In the 2004 general election, Loubriel won a seat in the 23rd Senate of Puerto Rico to represent the district of Arecibo, along with José Emilio González Velázquez. Loubriel finished in second place, with 123,503 votes (24.8%), more than 6,000 votes over the third candidate.

Loubriel gained notoriety when he resigned to his seat two days after being sworn in. His vacancy was filled by Pedro Rosselló, who had just lost his bid for a third term as governor. As senator, Rosselló led a power struggle against fellow senator and party member Kenneth McClintock for the presidency of the Senate. Because of this, several sources argued that Loubriel might have received money or benefits in exchange for his seat. Loubriel denied the charges.
