= Sila María González Calderón =

Puerto Rican politician

Member of the Puerto Rico Senate from the at-large district
- In office January 2, 2005 – January 1, 2013

Minority Whip of the Senate of Puerto Rico
- In office 2005–2009
- Preceded by: Orlando Parga
- Succeeded by: Eduardo Bhatia

First Lady of Puerto Rico
- In role 2001-2005 Serving with María Elena González Calderón
- Governor: Sila Calderón
- Preceded by: Maga Nevares de Rosselló
- Succeeded by: Luisa Gándara

Personal details
- Born: May 3, 1965 (age 61) San Juan, Puerto Rico
- Party: Popular Democratic Party
- Children: 3
- Education: Wharton School (BEc); Boston University School of Law (JD)
- Profession: Politician, Attorney

Sila María González Calderón (born May 3, 1965, on San Juan, Puerto Rico) is a Puerto Rican attorney and former senator. She is the daughter of former Governor of Puerto Rico Sila Calderón, and served as her First Lady, along with her sister, María Elena. After that, she served as a member of the Senate of Puerto Rico from 2005 to 2013. She currently works as an attorney for the McConnell Valdés law firm.

== Early years and University of Puerto Rico ==
Sila María González was born on May 3, 1965, on San Juan, Puerto Rico to engineer Francisco Xavier González and Sila Calderón. She studied elementary and junior high school at the Colegio Puertorriqueño de Niñas in Guaynabo, finishing high school at Saint John's School in Condado.

In 1987, she obtained her bachelor's degree in Economy from the University of Pennsylvania with a concentration on International Commerce from Wharton School of Economics. She continued studying law at Boston University, graduating in 1990. After passing the bar exam, she started working as an attorney in Massachusetts.

== Professional career: 1990-2000 ==
Sila María González worked as Assistant Regional Counsel in the Superfund area of the Environmental Protection Agency in Boston. In 1992, she returned to Puerto Rico and obtained the license to practice law in the island, on Federal Court, and on the Court of Appeals for the First Circuit in Boston.

She started working as a corporative attorney for the Ledesma, Palou & Miranda Law Firm, and then for O'Neill & Borges where she specialized in real estate and notary. She then worked for the Maldonado Nicolai Law Firm for two years, mostly on commercial closings for financial institutions.

== Political career: 2004-2013 ==
Sila María was elected to the Senate of Puerto Rico on the 2004 general elections. She was reelected on 2008. During her time in the Senate, she has been the speaker for commissions on Education, Family Affairs, Treasury, Government, and Ethics.

In September 2011, González announced she wouldn't run for a third term in the Senate citing a desire to return to her private life. In her statement, González remarked that she felt "shame" in being part of the 16th Legislative Assembly of Puerto Rico, which has faced the resignations of seven legislators due to public scandals of corruption, drug use, and others.

== Return to private life ==
After finishing her term in the Senate, González returned to her profession as an attorney. In January 2013, it was announced that she would join the McConnell Valdés law firm. According to the firm website, González main areas of practice include general corporate work and government affairs.

== Personal life ==
Sila María González has three children from her first marriage. During her time as First Lady, she was in a relationship with reporter Ramón "Papo" Brenes. She was also in a brief relationship with fellow senator Héctor Martínez Maldonado. In 2012, she confirmed she was in a relationship with businessman Manuel Rivera González with whom she planned to marry.

Senate of Puerto Rico
Preceded by Orlando Parga	Minority Whip of the Puerto Rico Senate; 2005–2009	Succeeded by Eduardo Bhatia
Honorary titles
Preceded by Maga Nevares de Rosselló	First Lady of Puerto Rico; 2001-2005	Succeeded by Luisa Gándara
