= Wilma Pastrana =

First Lady of Puerto Rico

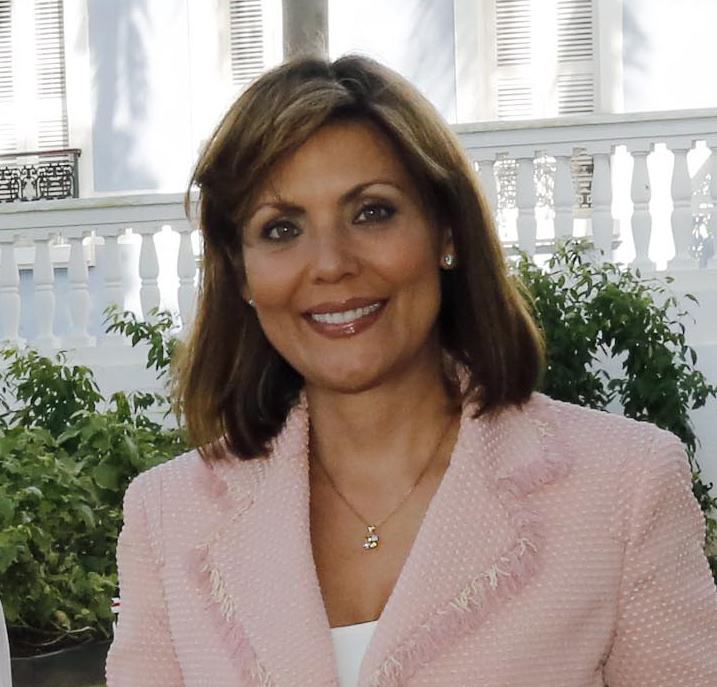

Municipal legislator of Guaynabo
- Incumbent
- Assumed office January 2, 2025

First Lady of Puerto Rico
- In role January 2, 2013 – January 2, 2017
- Governor: Alejandro García Padilla
- Preceded by: Lucé Vela
- Succeeded by: Beatriz Rosselló

Personal details
- Born: Wilma Pastrana Jiménez; January 17, 1970 (age 56) San Juan, Puerto Rico
- Party: Popular Democratic Party of Puerto Rico
- Spouse: Alejandro García Padilla (m. 2001)
- Children: Ana Patricia; Juan Pablo; Diego Alejandro
- Education: Boston University (BBA)
- Profession: Certified Public Accountant (CPA)

Wilma Pastrana Jiménez (born January 17, 1970) is a certified public accountant and wife of the former governor of Puerto Rico, Alejandro García Padilla. Pastrana became the 13th First Lady of Puerto Rico on January 2, 2013, and took on programs to improve child education, health, and welfare on the island. She was elected as municipal legislator of Guaynabo in the 2024 general elections.

== Biography ==
Wilma Pastrana Jiménez was born in San Juan, Puerto Rico. She grew up in Río Piedras and graduated with honors from the Colegio Nuestra Señora del Pilar. She earned a Bachelor of Business Administration from Boston University before returning to Puerto Rico and obtaining a CPA license.

Pastrana married Alejandro García Padilla on April 7, 2001. They have three children: Ana, Juan Pablo, and Diego.

Pastrana worked with businesses and organizations such as Deloitte & Touche, GlaxoSmithKline, Panell Kerr and Foster, as well as the Puerto Rico Convention Center and the Tourism Company, continuing even after she became first lady. When her husband won the Governorship of the Island, Pastrana took on additional roles, including initiatives to reduce the dropout rate and spur educational development, to combat childhood obesity and improve health to provide safe spaces and developmental opportunities for children living with disabilities, to teach nutrition and gardening skills throughout the country and several other social service programs to build community.

On April 26, 2022 Wilma Pastrana and Alejandro García Padilla announced they had divorced

Honorary titles
Preceded by Lucé Vela	First Lady of Puerto Rico; 2013–2017	Succeeded by Beatriz Rosselló
