= Carlos Romero Barceló =

Governor of the Commonwealth of Puerto Rico (1932–2021)

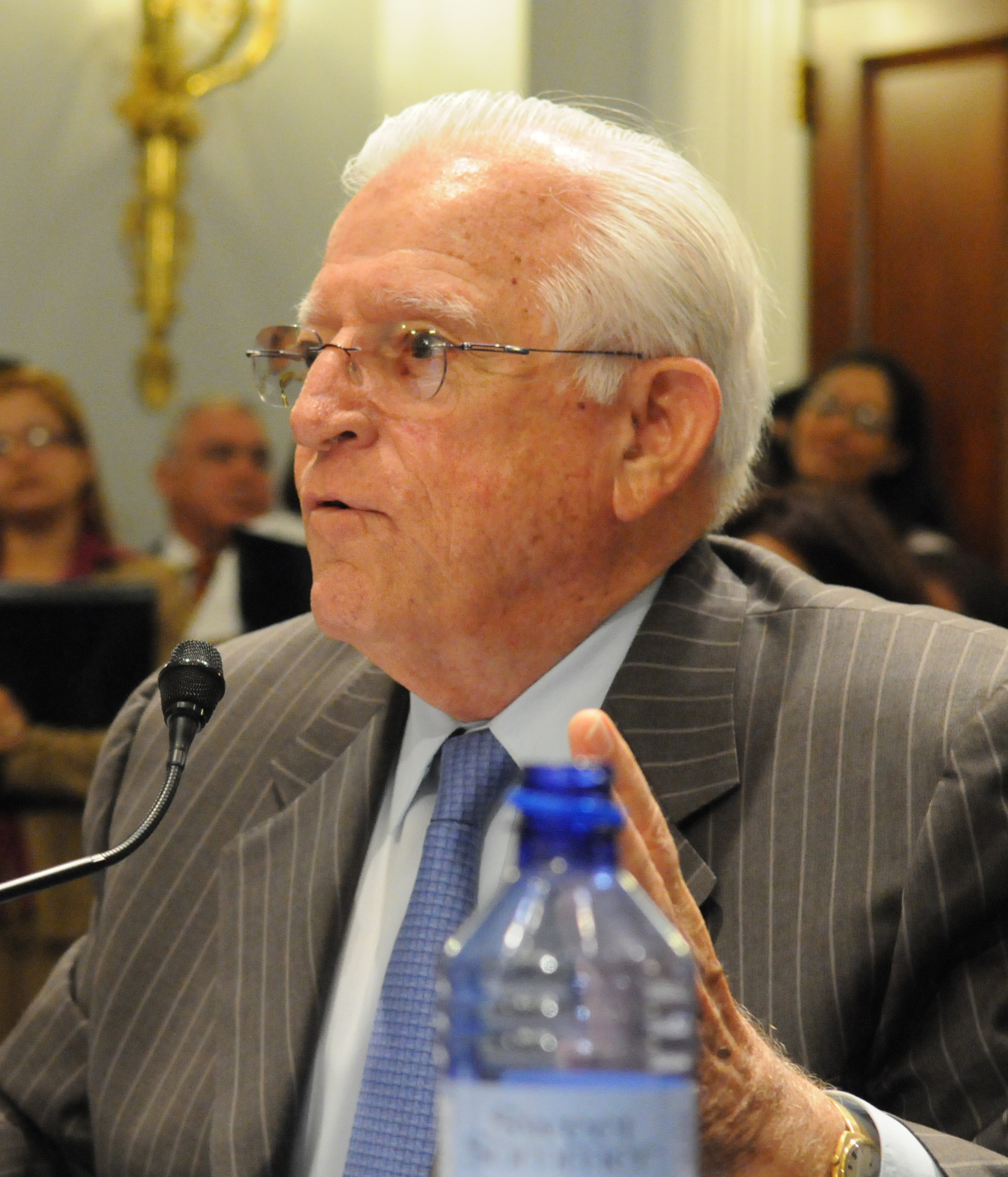
- Barceló in 2009

United States Shadow Senator from Puerto Rico
- In office August 15, 2017 – May 2, 2021
- Appointed by: Ricardo Rosselló
- Preceded by: Position established
- Succeeded by: Zoraida Buxó

Resident Commissioner of Puerto Rico
- In office January 2, 1993 – January 2, 2001
- Preceded by: Antonio Colorado
- Succeeded by: Aníbal Acevedo Vilá

Member of the Puerto Rico Senate from the Bayamón district
- In office September 5, 1986 – January 2, 1989
- Preceded by: Juan Hernandez Ferrer
- Succeeded by: Anibal Marrero Perez

Governor of Puerto Rico
- In office January 2, 1977 – January 2, 1985
- Preceded by: Rafael Hernández Colón
- Succeeded by: Rafael Hernández Colón

President of the New Progressive Party
- In office January 2, 1989 – March 23, 1991
- Preceded by: Ramon Luis Rivera
- Succeeded by: Pedro Rosselló
- In office October 7, 1974 – June 20, 1987
- Preceded by: Luis A. Ferré
- Succeeded by: Baltasar Corrada del Río

Mayor of San Juan
- In office January 2, 1969 – January 2, 1977
- Preceded by: Felisa Rincón de Gautier
- Succeeded by: Hernán Padilla

49th President of the National League of Cities
- In office 1975
- Preceded by: Jake Garn
- Succeeded by: Hans Tanzler

Personal details
- Born: Carlos Antonio Romero Barceló; September 4, 1932 San Juan, Puerto Rico
- Died: May 2, 2021 (aged 88) San Juan, Puerto Rico
- Party: Republican Statehood (Before 1967); New Progressive (1967–2021)
- Other political affiliations: Democratic
- Spouse: Kate de Romero (m. 1966)
- Children: 4, including Melinda
- Education: Yale University (BA); University of Puerto Rico School of Law (LLB)

Carlos Antonio Romero Barceló (September 4, 1932 – May 2, 2021) was a Puerto Rican politician who served as the governor of Puerto Rico from 1977 to 1985. He was the second governor to be elected from the New Progressive Party (PNP). He also served on several other political positions including Mayor of San Juan from 1969 to 1977 and Resident Commissioner of Puerto Rico in United States Congress from 1993 to 2001.

Romero Barceló was the grandson of Antonio R. Barceló, a Union Party leader and advocate of Puerto Rican independence during the early 20th century, and the son of Josefina Barceló, the first woman to preside over a major political party in Puerto Rico.

== Early life ==
Romero Barceló was born in 1932 in San Juan, Puerto Rico, the son of Antonio Romero Moreno and Josefina Barceló Bird. His father was a lawyer and engineer who served as a superior court judge. His maternal grandfather was Antonio Rafael Barceló the son of Jaime José Barceló Miralles from Palma, Majorca, Balearic Islands, Spain and Josefa Martínez de León from Naguabo.

== Education ==
Carlos Romero Barceló attended Phillips Exeter Academy in the state of New Hampshire, graduating in 1949. Later he attended Yale University, obtaining a B.A. in Political Science and Economics in 1953. That same year, at age 21, he returned to Puerto Rico and enrolled at the University of Puerto Rico Law School, becoming a licensed lawyer in 1956.

== Political career ==
Romero Barceló, an avid supporter of Puerto Rico statehood with the United States of America, became involved with the "Partido Estadista Republicano", the forerunner of the New Progressive Party, which at the time was led by Miguel Angel Garcia Mendez. He formed part of "Ciudadanos pro Estado 51" (Citizens for the 51st State) in 1965. Later, he was one of the founder's of the pro-statehood group "Estadistas Unidos", founded by Luis Ferre.

=== Mayor ===
Romero was one of the founding members of the New Progressive Party in 1967. The following year he was elected Mayor of San Juan, Puerto Rico, succeeding the legendary "doña Fela" (Felisa Rincón de Gautier) and becoming the first popularly elected mayor of San Juan, since previous mayors were elected by the San Juan City Council, not directly by the electorate. During his second term, in 1973, he became the first Hispanic to become vice-president of the National League of Cities and at the end of 1974 was chosen to serve as president of the organization. He served as mayor until 1976 when he defeated incumbent governor of Puerto Rico Rafael Hernández Colón. While Hernán Padilla was elected to succeed him, technically, his immediate successor was Carlos S. Quirós, his Vice Mayor who became full mayor for over a week until Padilla's term began. Some of his notable accomplishments as mayor were the inclusion of San Juan into U.S. President Lyndon Johnson's Model Cities Program, which changed the face of the slum called "El Fanguito" to become the area of the "new" San Juan where modern facilities such as the San Juan Natatorium, the Puerto Rico Coliseum and numerous residential condominium projects were eventually built; the construction of the Roberto Clemente Coliseum and the first municipal educational institution of Puerto Rico: the Colegio Universitario de San Juan.

=== Governor ===
Romero Barceló brought well-received economic resolutions to the island during his terms in office, emphasizing the island's tourism potential. However, during his administration the economy recovered sluggishly, with unemployment dropping to 17% in 1979 from 19.0% in 1975, a disappointing 2% decline. The economy did not fully recover, and the island's government services deteriorated during his term in office. Moreover, his statements declaring the policemen that carried out the Maravilla murders to be heroes damaged his image.

In 1980 he was elected for a second term as governor by a margin of 3,037 votes again over PPD-candidate Rafael Hernández Colón. The 1980 gubernatorial elections were among the closest in Puerto Rican history, requiring the intervention of the Supreme Court of Puerto Rico to rule whether improperly cast ballots should be counted. In particular, the Puerto Rico Statehood Students Association under Luis Fortuño generated over 1,500 absentee ballots for Romero Barceló that proved an important factor in his re-election. However, the New Progressive Party lost control of the legislature, and party-affiliated mayors won in only 28 of the 78 municipalities on the island. The 1980 elections were the most controversial as many PPD followers said that the elections were stolen in which the PPD won the elections except for the governor candidacy in which almost every election the parties win with straight-party ballots. This election was similar to the 2004 and 2012 elections, decided by less-than-one-percent margins.

In his second term Puerto Rico was badly hit by a severe recession starting in 1980 and ending in 1983, the unemployment drastically rose to 25% in 1983 the highest since the Great Depression.

Romero Barceló is frequently associated with the "Cerro Maravilla Incident" of 1978 in which two young pro-Independence activists at Cerro Maravilla were killed at the hands of rogue members of the Puerto Rican Police after being lured by the police to a mountainous area that housed communications and television towers. The tragic incident was investigated several times by the Puerto Rico Justice Department, the U.S. Justice Department, and the F.B.I., and was widely reported on by the local press. In 1984, 10 police officers were indicted and found guilty of perjury, destruction of evidence, and obstruction of justice, with four being convicted of and one pleading guilty to second degree murder.

He sought re-election for a third term in 1984 but was defeated by Rafael Hernández Colón. After the elections, Romero-Barceló's reaction to the defeat, in response to TV news reporter Rafael Bracero, was ¿Derrota, qué Derrota? (Defeat, what defeat?). For him, he said, what had occurred was not a defeat, but simply an "electoral loss". The comment has become legendary in Puerto Rican politics.

=== Senator ===
In 1986, he was elected by his party to fill a vacancy in the Senate of Puerto Rico, a position for which he did not seek re-election in 1988. Instead, he returned to his private law practice and shortly thereafter merged his law firm with Del Toro & Santana where he practiced until his election to the United States Congress in 1992.

=== Resident Commissioner ===
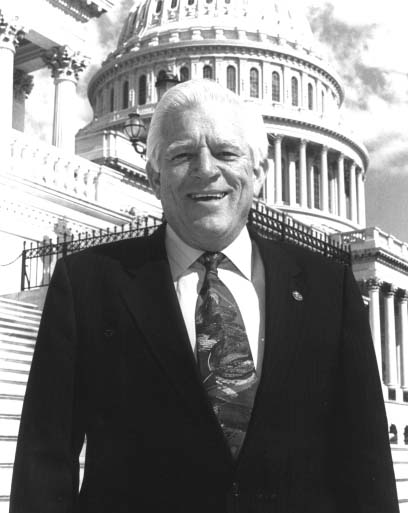
Carlos Romero Barcelo in Washington, D.C.

In the 1992 elections, Romero was elected to the 103rd and 104th United States Congress as Resident Commissioner of Puerto Rico, and relocated to Washington, D.C. He was re-elected to the 105th and 106th United States Congress as well.

During his tenure as Resident Commissioner he campaigned for Puerto Rican statehood, successfully proposed to Congress the derogation of the 936 tax code and endorsed the Young Project, which sought to call a referendum to resolve Puerto Rico's political status. In 2000, he sought a third term but was defeated by PPD's Aníbal Acevedo Vilá. He once again sought his party's nomination for the post of Resident Commissioner in 2003, but was defeated by Luis Fortuño. Although he retired from electoral politics, he remained active in PNP political gatherings, the Puerto Rico Democratic Party, the United States Democratic party, and was a member of the League of United Latin American Citizens.

=== Shadow United States Senator ===
On July 3, 2017, he was appointed by Governor Ricardo Rosselló as Puerto Rico's first United States Shadow Senator to the U.S. Senate under the Tennessee Plan approved by Act No. 30 of June 5, 2017 of the Puerto Rico Legislature. Holders of this position do not officially participate in Senate proceedings, but may serve as an advocate for their territories.

== Death ==
Romero Barceló was hospitalized in San Juan, Puerto Rico in March 2021 for sepsis and a urinary tract infection. He died a month later on May 2, 2021, at the age of 88.

== Legacy ==
Romero Barceló married Kate Donnelly on January 2, 1966. His daughter, Melinda Romero Donnelly, was an NPP member of the House of Representatives of Puerto Rico for 8 years, later becoming state senator when she won a special election in 2009 for the vacant seat of former senator Jorge De Castro Font. Romero Barceló was a boxing fan, and advocated for holding world championship bouts in San Juan during his terms in office. Some of his accomplishments were the Minillas Tunnel, the Centro de Bellas Artes Luis A. Ferre, the creation of the Puerto Rico Federal Affairs Administration, and the Roberto Clemente Coliseum (while the Mayor of San Juan).

Federal charges filed against Puerto Rico former governor Aníbal Acevedo Vilá stemmed from a tip brought to federal prosecutors by Romero Barceló. Romero openly admitted to being the catalyst of the federal investigation against Acevedo Vilá. In 2000, Acevedo accused Romero Barcelo of receiving US$175,000 of illegal contributions to fund his own campaign bid for Resident Commissioner. In the end, Acevedo Vilá was acquitted of all charges.

== Accolades ==
In 1977, he received a doctorate Honoris causa from the University of Bridgeport in Connecticut.

== Publications ==
- "Puerto Rico, U.S.A.: The Case for Statehood." Foreign Affairs 59 (Fall 1980): pp. 58–81.
- Statehood Is For the Poor. N.P.: Master Typesetting of P.R. Inc., 1978. Originally published as La Estatidad es para los Pobres, 1973.
- The book titled Two Lynchings on Cerro Maravilla: The Police Murders in Puerto Rico and the Federal Government Coverup by then San Juan Star journalist Manuel 'Manny' Suarez.

== See also ==
- Nelson Famadas
- List of governors of Puerto Rico
- Voting rights in Puerto Rico
- List of Hispanic Americans in the United States Congress

Political offices
Preceded by Felisa Rincón de Gautier	Mayor of San Juan; 1969–1977	Succeeded by Hernán Padilla
Preceded by Rafael Hernández Colón	Governor of Puerto Rico; 1977–1985	Succeeded by Rafael Hernández Colón
Party political offices
Preceded by Luis A. Ferré	Chair of the Puerto Rico New Progressive Party; 1974–1987	Succeeded by Baltasar Corrada del Río
Preceded by Luis A. Ferré	New Progressive nominee for Governor of Puerto Rico; 1976, 1980, 1984	Succeeded by Baltasar Corrada del Río
Preceded by Ramón Luis Rivera	Chair of the Puerto Rico New Progressive Party; 1989–1991	Succeeded by Pedro Rosselló
U.S. House of Representatives
Preceded by Antonio Colorado	Resident Commissioner of Puerto Rico; 1993–2001	Succeeded by Aníbal Acevedo Vilá
U.S. Senate
New seat	U.S. Shadow Senator (Seat 2) from Puerto Rico; 2017–2021; Served alongside: Zoraida Fonalledas	Succeeded by Zoraida Buxó
