= Ricardo Rosselló =

Governor of Puerto Rico from 2017 to 2019

Ricky Rosselló
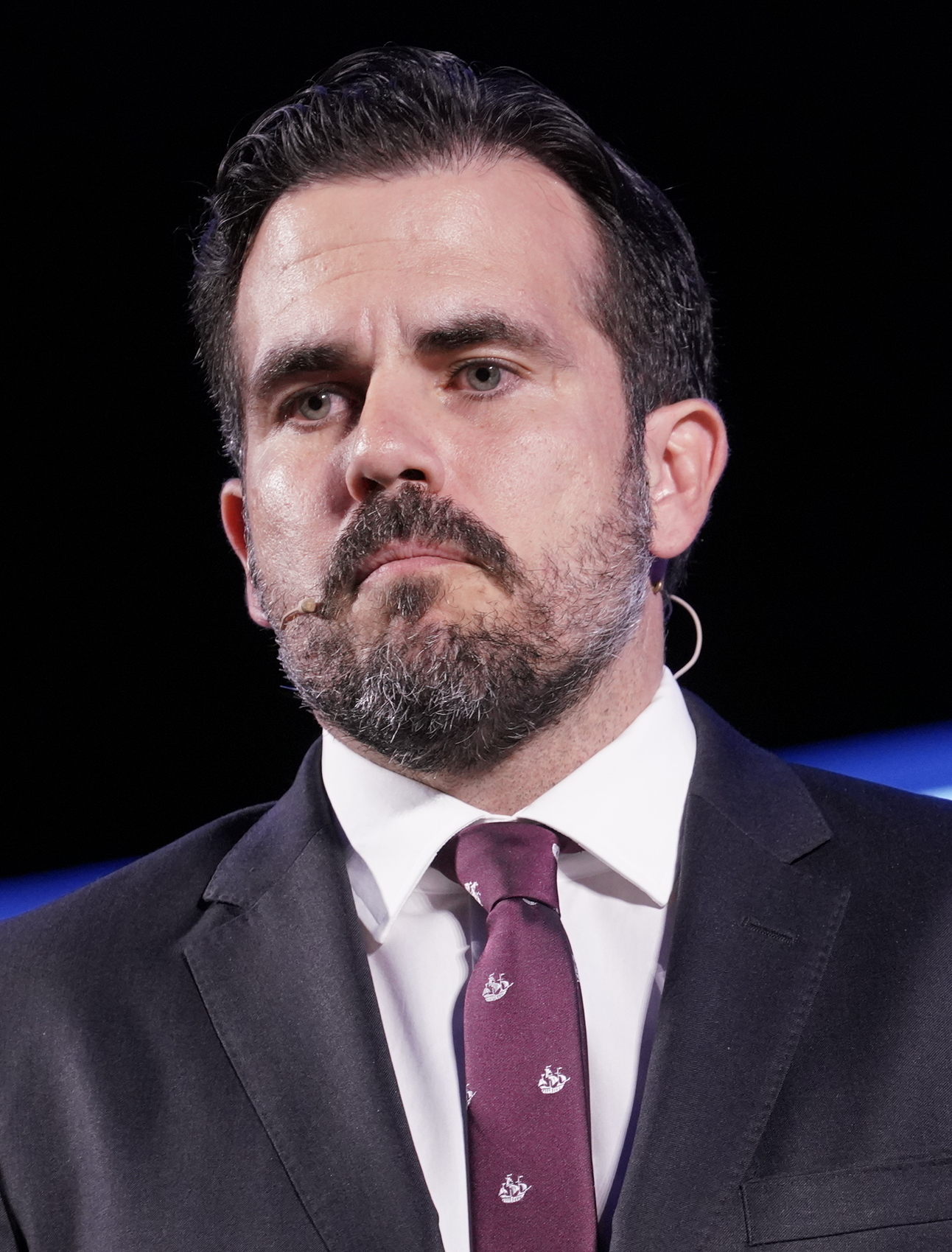
- Rosselló in 2019

Shadow Member of the U.S. House of Representatives from Puerto Rico
- In office July 7, 2021 – December 31, 2024
- Preceded by: Charlie Rodríguez
- Succeeded by: Vacant

Governor of Puerto Rico
- In office January 2, 2017 – August 2, 2019
- Preceded by: Alejandro García Padilla
- Succeeded by: Pedro Pierluisi (judicially annulled); Wanda Vázquez Garced (constitutionally appointed)

President of the New Progressive Party
- In office June 5, 2016 – July 22, 2019
- Preceded by: Pedro Pierluisi
- Succeeded by: Thomas Rivera Schatz (acting)

Personal details
- Born: Ricardo Antonio Rosselló Nevares; March 7, 1979 (age 47) San Juan, Puerto Rico
- Party: New Progressive
- Other political affiliations: Democratic (before 2026); Independent (2026–present)
- Spouses: Natasha Marie Cervi (m. 2008; div. 2010); Beatriz Areizaga (m. 2012)
- Children: 2
- Parent(s): Pedro Rosselló; Maga Nevares
- Education: Massachusetts Institute of Technology (BS); University of Michigan (MS, PhD)

Ricardo Antonio "Ricky" Rosselló Nevares (Latin American Spanish: [riˈkarðo roseˈʝo neˈβaɾes]; born March 7, 1979) is a Puerto Rican former politician, businessman, neurobiologist and educator who served as Governor of Puerto Rico from 2017 until his resignation in 2019. He is the son of Pedro Rosselló, who served as governor of Puerto Rico from 1993 to 2001.

Rosselló studied chemical engineering biomedical engineering and economics at the Massachusetts Institute of Technology (MIT), researching adult stem cells, earned his master’s and doctorate from the University of Michigan and postdoctoral studies in neuroscience and neurobiology at Duke University.

In 2010, Rosselló founded the political advocacy group Boricua ¡Ahora Es! to advocate for changing the current political status of Puerto Rico. Rosselló supports Puerto Rican statehood. Following several years of political advocacy, Rosselló announced that he would seek the nomination of the New Progressive Party (PNP in Spanish) for Governor of Puerto Rico in 2016. After winning the New Progressive Party primary, Rosselló was elected governor in the 2016 general election, defeating five other candidates.

In July 2019, Rosselló faced widespread controversy after a group chat on the Telegram app between Rosselló and his staff was made public. The chat contained offensive language, including sexist, homophobic, misogynistic and elitist remarks, as well as discussions on the operation of Internet troll networks on social media. A message by one of the participants in the chat mocked the struggles faced by Puerto Ricans in the aftermath of Hurricane Maria, which had caused around 3,000 deaths, although this has been refuted by the author. The leak led to widespread protests across Puerto Rico, with demonstrators calling for Rosselló’s resignation. On July 17, 2019, an estimated 500,000 people participated in protests in Old San Juan. Initially, Rosselló stated his intention to complete his term as governor, but he later announced that he would resign, which he did on August 2, 2019. The Special Independent Prosecutor's Panel, which investigated the Telegraph scandal, submitted their evidence to the Institute of Forensic Sciences. The Institute's detailed analysis concluded that the PDF document purporting to be a transcript of the Telegram chat "is not an original, that it is not a complete document, and that it has been modified."

In 2021, he returned to active politics by receiving 53,823 write-in votes as a congressional shadow delegation member, becoming the first Puerto Rican politician to be directly nominated. Rossello published The Reformer’s Dilemma in 2024, a book about his political experience and challenges with reforms. The book was a finalist in the American Book Fest.

Rossello is currently the Chief Vision Officer for The Regenerative Medicine Institute, a longevity and stem cell research institute and clinic.

== Early life and education ==
Rosselló was born 1979 in San Juan, Puerto Rico, the son of Pedro Rosselló and Maga Nevares. His older brothers are Juan Óscar (b. 1971) and Luis Roberto (b. 1973). Pedro Rosselló served as Governor of Puerto Rico from 1993 to 2001. Rosselló's paternal great-grandfather, Pedro Juan Rosselló Batle, immigrated in 1902 at the age of 23 from Lloseta, Mallorca, Spain. He completed his postdoctoral studies at Duke University’s department of Neurobiology where he designed and tested a novel universal mechanism for stem cell induction that can be useful for tissue regeneration, translational therapies and in-vitro disease modelling.

Rosselló attended high school at Colegio Marista de Guaynabo. He was selected to compete in the International Mathematical Olympiads.

Rosselló earned a bachelor's degree from the Massachusetts Institute of Technology (MIT) in 2001 in biomedical engineering and economics. As a researcher in college, Rosselló focused on adult stem cell research. He received a Ph.D. in biomedical engineering from the University of Michigan.

== Early career ==
=== Scientific career ===
Rossello worked for 15 years as a Stem Cell and Bioengineer researcher at MIT, the University of Michigan, Duke University, The University of Puerto Rico Medical Sciences Campus, The Comprehensive Cancer Research Center, Ana G Mendez University, and the Howard Hughes Medical Institute. In addition, Rosselló is a co-founder of Beijing Prosperous Biopharm, a medical research company focused on cancer, neurodegeneration problems, diabetes, and HIV. Rosselló worked on various drug development research. Rosselló founded a company called Auctoritas Lab in the U.S.

Rossello’s work focused on reprogramming stem cells for humans and a variety of animals by genetic manipulation with viral vectors. Rossello and his colleagues were able to show pluripotency in vitro by generating embryoid bodies and all three germ cell lineages. Rossello has also worked on tissue regeneration, neurogenesis and biomaterials.

His work in neurobiology centered on recreating and studying the vocal learning pathway in songbirds to understand the implications for learning in humans.

Rossello was recognized as a member of the Iberoamerican Scientific and Culture Academy for his scientific achievements.

His work on “Tissue Regeneration Signaling” with mesenchymal stem cells in three-dimensions was highlighted on the Cover of The Proceedings of the National Academy of Science.

=== Early political involvement ===
Rosselló became involved in politics during the 2008 Puerto Rico gubernatorial election when his father Pedro Rosselló lost a party primary against the eventual Governor Luis Fortuño. Rosselló was a Hillary Clinton delegate to the 2008 nominating convention and an Obama delegate to the 2012 convention. In 2008, he participated in Clinton's get-out-the-vote efforts for the June 1 Puerto Rico presidential primary, appearing in her final TV ad with several Democratic political leaders, including fellow statehooder Kenneth McClintock and commonwealth's Roberto Prats and José A. Hernández Mayoral.

Following this event, Rosselló became a political commentator, writing columns for El Vocero, a daily newspaper published in San Juan, covering politics, science, healthcare and economics topics. Additionally, Rosselló appeared as a regular guest analyst in several political radio talk shows.

He published a book that depicted the accomplishments of his father's administration (1993–2001). All copies of the limited edition print were exhausted in one day. To diffuse the message, he allowed the material to be public domain and published it on the La Obra de Rosselló website for everyone to read.

In 2012, Rosselló founded Boricua ¡Ahora Es!, a political advocacy group that advocates changing Puerto Rico's current political status. The movement featured a grass-roots educational campaign, suggesting that involvement of the international community may be necessary for the United States government to take action. Boricua ¡Ahora Es! actively campaigned during the 2012 Puerto Rico status referendum.

Rosselló was accused by Bolivian author Lupe Andrade of plagiarizing her column Responsabilidad y democracia ("Accountability and Democracy"). He denied the claim and no legal action followed.

== Governor of Puerto Rico ==
=== 2016 gubernatorial campaign ===
Since 2012, Rosselló was mentioned as a potential gubernatorial candidate for the 2016 election cycle.

In 2013, he began organizing a group of collaborators to build what he called Plan para Puerto Rico (Plan for Puerto Rico). This plan would serve as a blueprint to deal with the economic and political problems and Puerto Rico and by being built years before a candidacy, it would represent a more complete and realistic political agenda. In 2014, Rosselló utilized his political platform to perform several protest events against the policies of the incumbent governor of Puerto Rico, Alejandro García Padilla. Some of these events included a march against a proposed Value Added Tax. Rosselló described that he intended to apply a scientific approach to governance. As a part of this, he traveled to other countries and US states to study how they approached various problems in governing, such as Finland, Estonia, and Florida.

On September 19, 2015, he confirmed his intention to run for Governor of Puerto Rico in the 2016 election, and held a campaign rally the next day at Roberto Clemente Coliseum in San Juan that surpassed the previous attendance record held by Ricky Martin. At the rally, he endorsed Jenniffer González, a Republican, for Resident Commissioner.

On June 5, 2016, Rosselló won the New Progressive Party primary against incumbent Resident Commissioner Pedro Pierluisi, thus becoming the party's candidate for governor and heading to the general election against PPD candidate David Bernier. He made Puerto Rican statehood the central issue of his campaign, and views statehood as the key to economic recovery.

On November 8, 2016, Rosselló defeated five other gubernatorial candidates and was elected Governor of Puerto Rico, receiving 41% of the vote. He was sworn in on January 2, 2017.

=== Tenure ===
==== Domestic policies ====
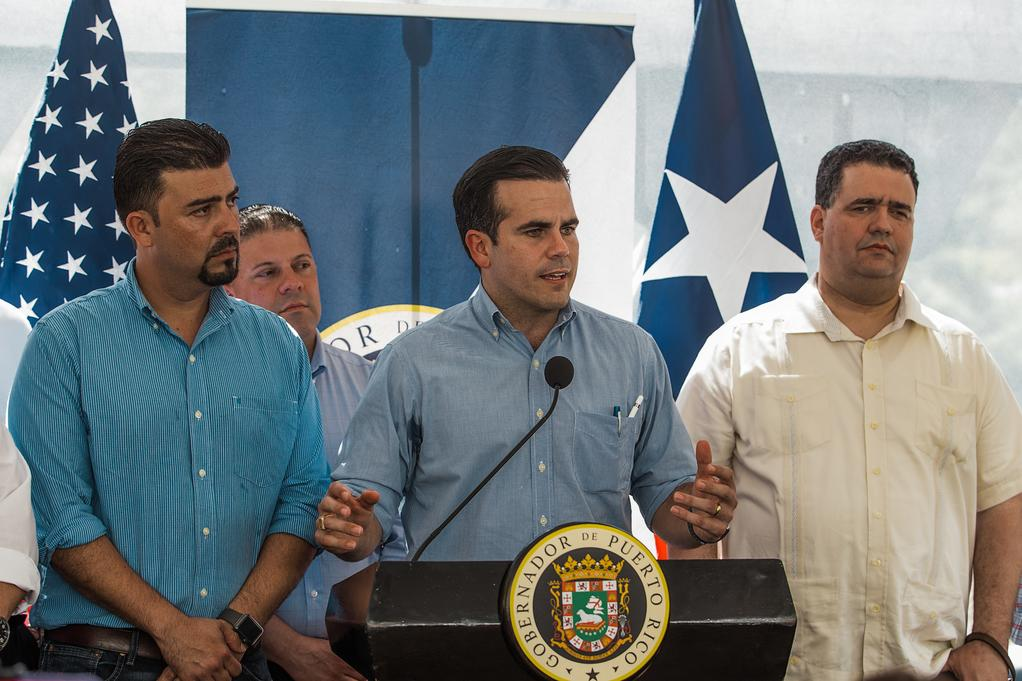
Rosselló (center) speaks in Utuado, Puerto Rico in March 2018.

Upon his election, Rosselló was the second-youngest person to become Governor of Puerto Rico. On his first day as governor, Rosselló signed six executive orders. His first executive order was the OE-2017-001, decreeing a state of fiscal emergency. The second order was the OE-2017-002, which creates the COF with the intent of obtaining, maximizing and overseeing more federal funds. Rosselló signed the Permitting Reform Act (Law 19-2017) to streamline the permitting process, promoting business investment and job creation in Puerto Rico. The law consolidates multiple permits into a Single Permit and introduces the Unified Information System for online applications. Additionally, Executive Order OE-2017-003 aims to expedite permits for infrastructure projects that support citizen services and economic development. These efforts seek to improve Puerto Rico’s competitiveness and attract foreign investment. The fourth executive order, OE-2017-004, creates an interagency group of projects critical for the infrastructure, a collateral effect of the OE 2017–003. The fifth executive order, OE-2017-005, orders the implementation of the method of zero base budget for the preparation of the budget for the fiscal year 2017–2018. The last executive order Rosselló signed on his first day was the OE-2017-006; it decrees a public policy within the Government of Puerto Rico that guarantees equal pay and work for women employees He also began the process of restructuring Puerto Rico's national debt.

In 2017, Rosselló signed the Permitting Reform Act, streamlining business permitting processes on the island, and he also created the Puerto Rico Department of Public Safety. In July 2017, Rosselló signed a bill that enacts regulations and makes the use of marijuana legal for medicinal use. The move goes further than the executive order issued by his predecessor which in Roselló's words, "ignored the legislative process and, following an executive order, promulgated a regulation without due discussion with all sectors and representatives elected by the people." Rosselló has stated that he intends to shrink the size of government, through reducing funding to various parts of the bureaucracy. He also started an effort on labor reform, which was revoked after differences between the governor's intended version and the version developed by the Financial Oversight and Management Board. Rosselló then tabled a second version of the plan in March 2018.

In 2017, he signed the Equal Pay Act, pushing for equal pay regardless of gender. In 2018 he signed six laws targeting the reform of the insurance industry, as a response to how insurance companies acted during recent hurricanes. In December 2017, Rosselló signed the "New Government Law", which was intended to consolidate agencies in order to improve efficiency and save capital. Rosselló stated, "the objective is to establish a platform where we can reduce a 131 agencies to 30 or 35 agencies in Puerto Rico." Rosselló’s administration brought an anti-corruption law for public administration-level reforms focusing on fraud, bribery, petty crimes and kickbacks. Rosselló signed an executive order that brought the minimum wage for Puerto Rico construction workers under government contracting from the previous minimum wage of $8.25 per hour to $15.00 per hour. Rosselló’s administration brought an anti-corruption law for public administration-level reforms focusing on fraud, bribery, petty crimes and kickbacks.

In June 2019, Ricardo Rosello announced that $2 million had been appropriated to the Puerto Rico Office for Socioeconomic and Community Development (ODSEC by its Spanish initials) for construction of new roofs. The total number of homes that could receive new roofs was 180, of the 20,000 to 30,000 homes still missing roofs since Hurricane Maria hit Puerto Rico on September 20, 2017. Wanda Vázquez Garced, the governor who followed his troubled tenure, stated all contracts signed by Rosselló would be reviewed by her administration. Rosselló's alleged corruption was given as a reason to further delay promised funds for Hurricane Maria recovery, as announced by United States Department of Housing and Urban Development on August 6, 2019.

==== Economic strategies ====
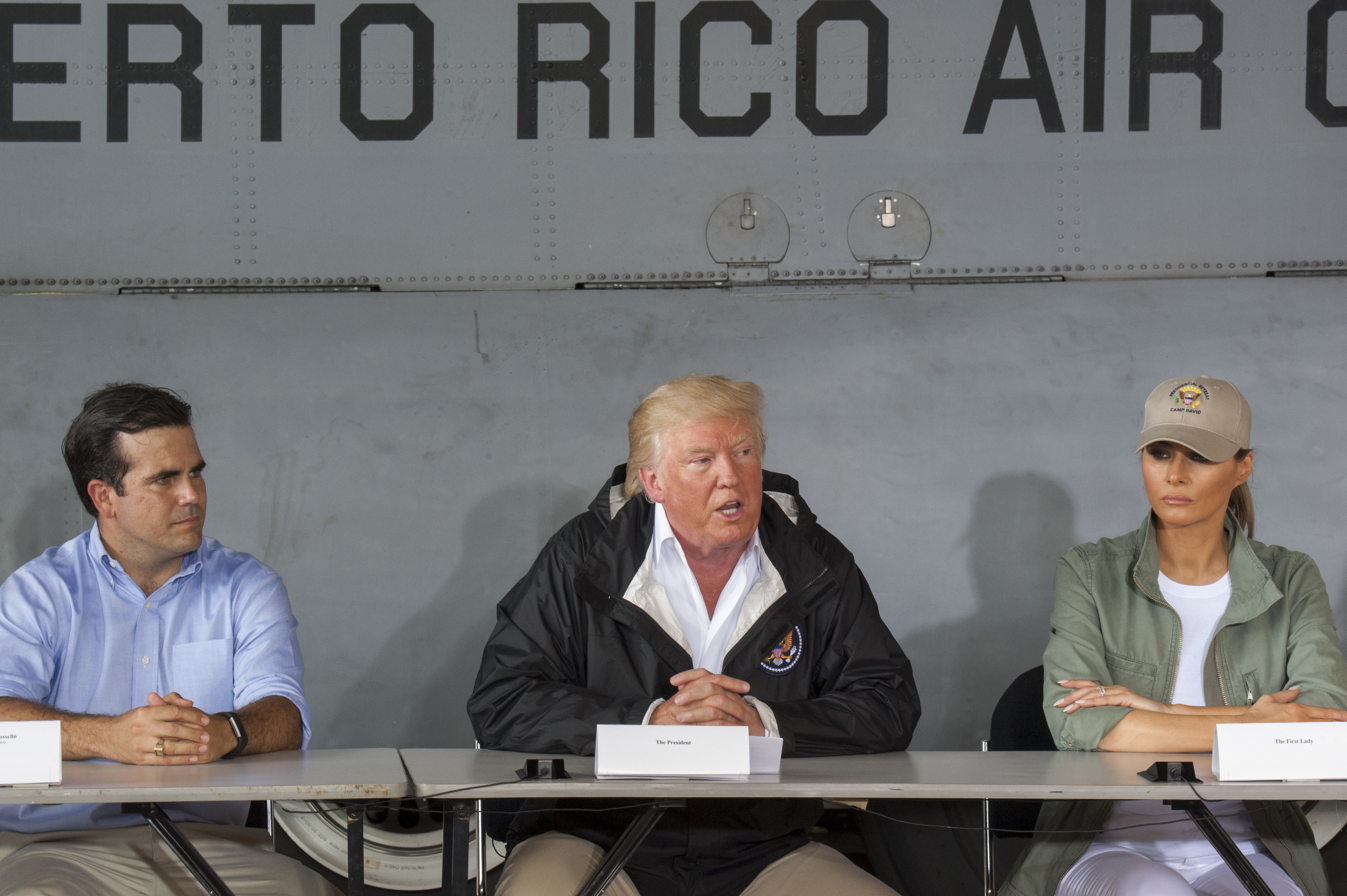
Rosselló with President Donald Trump and First Lady Melania Trump following Hurricane Maria in 2017

By the time Rosselló took office, the Puerto Rican government-debt crisis posed serious problems for the government which was saddled with outstanding debt of $70 billion or $12,000 per capita at a time with a 45% poverty rate and 14.2% unemployment that is more than twice the mainland U.S. average.

The Commonwealth had been defaulting on many debts, including bonds, since 2015. Rosselló discussed the situation and sketched out his plans in an interview with the international Financial Times in mid January and indicated that he would seek an amicable resolution with creditors and also make fiscal reforms. "There will be real fiscal oversight and we are willing to sit down. We are taking steps to make bold reforms. ... What we are asking for is runway to establish these reforms and have Washington recognise that they have a role to play." He also implemented austerity measures, instructing Puerto Rican government agencies to cut operating expenses by 10% and reduce political appointees by 20%.

To ensure funds would be available to pay for "essential" government services Rosselló signed a fiscal emergency law on January 28, 2017, that would set aside funds that might otherwise be required for debt payments.

In late January, the federal control board created under PROMESA gave the government until February 28 to present a fiscal plan - including negotiations with creditors - to solve the problems. It is essential for Puerto Rico to reach restructuring deals to avoid a bankruptcy-like process under PROMESA. A moratorium on lawsuits by debtors was extended to May 31. Rosselló had signed the Betting Committee Act, legalizing crypto currency as well as online and live gambling, including esports, fantasy sports, and sports betting. The legislation aimed to boost the local economy and position Puerto Rico as a hub for sports betting, with the industry projected to reach over $3 billion by 2023.

Rosselló’s administration achieved an agreed upon fiscal plan with the oversight board, contrasting the failed efforts of his predecessor in 2016. In his oral testimony to PROMESA on May 2, Rosselló stated that his fiscal structural reforms reduced the potential layoffs of over 20,000 employees using a voluntary transition program, reduced 20% of the government agencies, and operational costs by 17%. In the same testimony, he also stated that these reforms created 18,000 new jobs and contributed toward post-hurricane recovery and rebuilding. In December, he signed into law a legislation, creating an earned income tax credit to provide $2 billion tax relief within five years.

In July 2018, Rosselló administration announced that Puerto Rico’s unemployment rate to be 9.3 percent which was allegedly the lowest then in 50 years.

His administration also secured $18.5 billon from the US Department of Housing and Urban Development for long-term recovery and repair of houses, businesses and infrastructure destroyed by the Hurricane Maria. This, together with the $1,5 billion awarded earlier in February, was historically the largest federal grant.

==== Environment ====
Rosselló passed laws to cut carbon emissions by 50% in ten years, ending coal use and shifting to renewable energy.

==== Education ====
On February 5, 2018, Rosselló announced a broad education reform. The reform aimed to incorporate into Puerto Rico's education system school vouchers and charter schools as well as bring more attention to students. It was signed into law in March 2018, guaranteeing 70% of the island’s education budget going to local schools.

==== Tourism ====
Rosselló announced an MOU between the Puerto Rico Tourism Company (PRTC) and the Puerto Rico Innovation & Technology Service (PRITS) to create a digital archive called the Tourism Intelligence Platform to collect tourism data and inform decision-making tourism competitiveness improvement. It also included creation of the Destination Management Organization (DMO) to market Puerto Rico as a tourism destination and enhance the management of tourism activities.

==== Inter-state positions ====
In 2019, Rosselló became the president of the Council of State Governments.

==== Social issues ====
Rosselló is known as fiscally conservative. He supports abortion rights, gender equality, legalization of medical marijuana but opposes its legalization for recreational use. In terms of LGBT rights, Rosselló has a mixed record. Initially, he came out against marriage equality, however he was a proponent of adoption rights for same-sex couples, and created the first advisory board on LGBT issues. In 2019 he issued an executive order to ban conversion therapy of LGBT youth and minors. Under his administration for the first time the residence of the governor was illuminated in rainbow colors, a nod to the support of his administration to the LGBT community. Furthermore, Rosselló was highly critical of President Donald Trump's anti-immigration policies.

==== Views on statehood ====
Rosselló was strongly in favor of statehood for Puerto Rico to help develop the economy and to help Puerto Rico's 500-year old colonial dilemma. "Colonialism is not an option .... It's a civil rights issue ... The time will come in which the United States has to respond to the demands of 3.5 million citizens seeking an absolute democracy" he stated. In January 2017, he announced that Puerto Ricans will be given an opportunity to vote in the fifth plebiscite on June 11, 2017, with three options: "Statehood", "Current Territorial Status" and "Independence/Free Association". It initially did not offer the second option, which was added at the request of United States Department of Justice (U.S. DOJ).

On June 11, 2017, the results of the plebiscite were 97% in favor of statehood. However, the plebiscite results have been marred and been called into question. Due to months of calls for boycotting by his political rivals and confusion, the turnout for the plebiscite was 23% of the eligible electorate. Rosselló plans on creating a commission that will ensure the validity of the referendum in Congress. He has stated that he does not believe that Puerto Rico yet has the political infrastructure to pursue statehood, and that he intends to develop it.

== Professor ==
Rosselló was a professor at the Cancer and Cell Reprogramming Lab, a laboratory focusing on reprogramming cell states for cancer research, of the Metropolitan University, currently the Ana G. Méndez University. He also taught at the University of Puerto Rico’s medical sciences campus as an auxiliary professor. Rosselló is currently an adjunct professor at the George Mason University.

== Telegram scandal ==
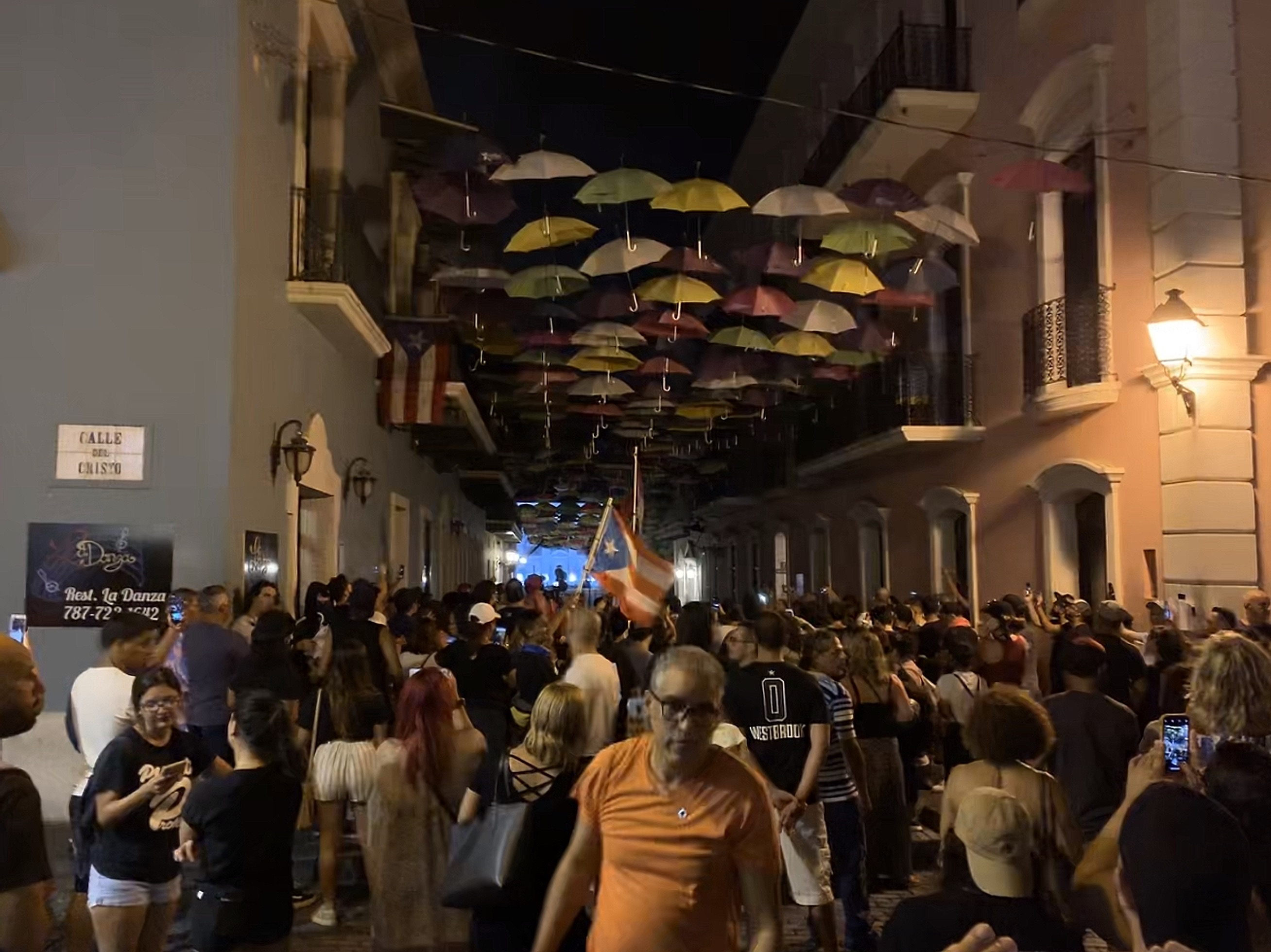
Public protests in front of La Fortaleza following the incident

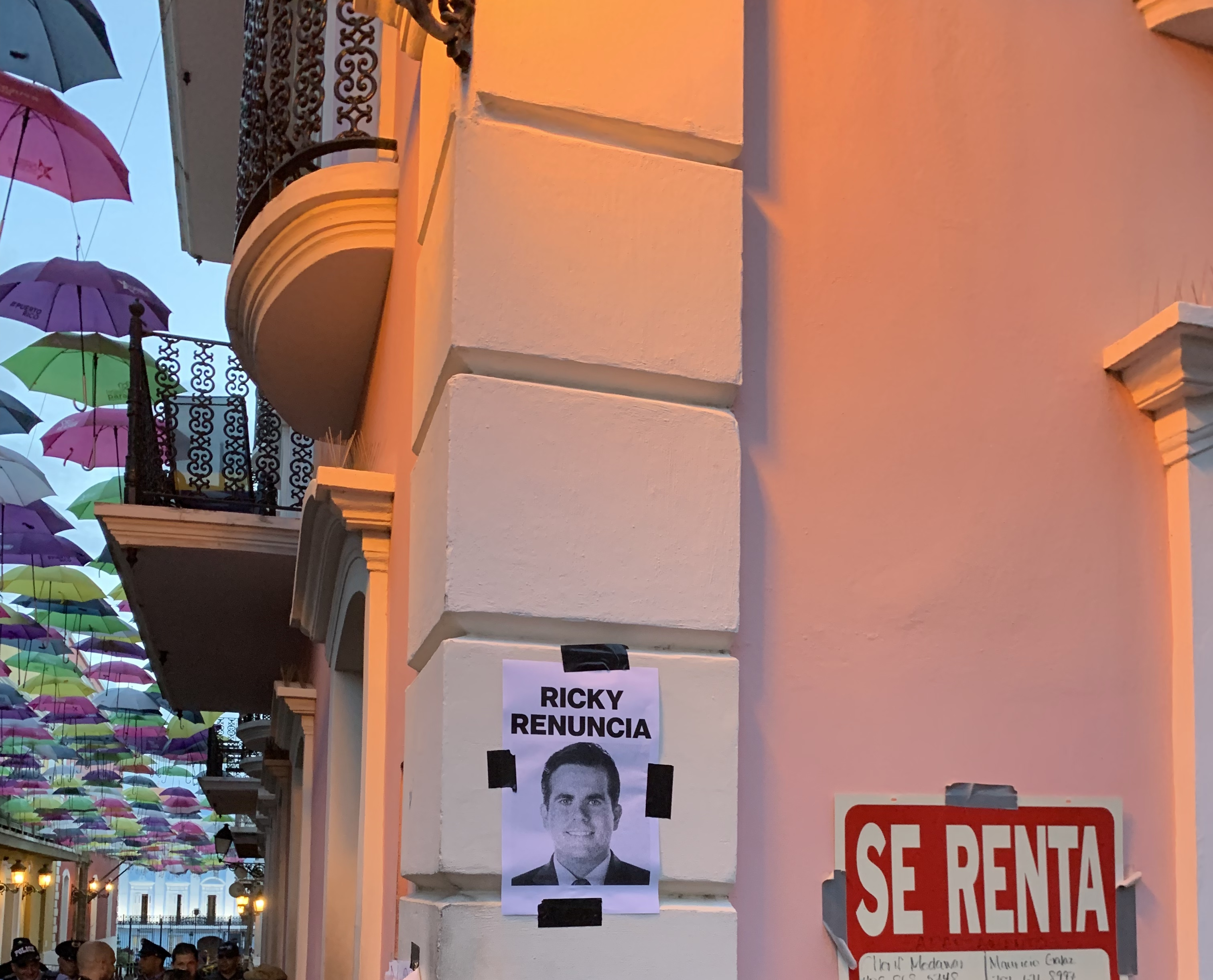
A poster demanding the resignation of Rosselló

On July 8, 2019, screenshots of a group chat on the Telegram messaging service, which the governor belonged to, were leaked. The authenticity of these screenshots was confirmed the following day by Chief of Staff Ricardo Llerandi, who — along with several other high-ranking government officials — participated in the chat. Some on Twitter have dubbed the scandal Telegramgate.

Rosselló interrupted his vacation in France to fly to Puerto Rico and attend a press conference where he took responsibility for his part in the Telegram chat. Rosselló released a statement in which he apologized for the comments, excusing himself by explaining that he had been working 18-hour days and was releasing tension. Rosselló added that he would not resign as Governor of Puerto Rico and indicated that he did not know who leaked the chat or when it was deleted. On July 13, 2019, the entirety of the chat was made public by local news agency Centro de Periodismo Investigativo.

The screenshots were reported by El Nuevo Día as containing vulgar and homophobic comments and attacks against other politicians, such as former Speaker of the New York City Council Melissa Mark-Viverito, as well as local journalists and celebrities. Rosselló described Mark-Viverito as a "puta", Spanish for whore; Mark-Viverito responded to this soon afterwards on her Twitter account, condemning his use of the word. Several members of the New Progressive Party also condemned the governor's expressions. The transcript, released July 13, shows government officials, including Rosselló, conspiring to operate an internet troll network to discredit press, journalists and opposition politicians, according to several news sources. In one message, Rosselló jokes about shooting Carmen Yulín Cruz, the mayor of San Juan. Allegedly, Rosselló improperly conducted public business on the chat, as one of the participants — Elías Sánchez — no longer worked directly with Rosselló. The chat has been cited as giving Sánchez an unfair advantage in his business dealings, as he was privy to internal government affairs while working for Wolf Popper, a company that does business with government agencies.

Puerto Rico's sole representative in the U.S. Congress, Jenniffer González, said that she believed Rosselló should not seek re-election as a result of the incident, but supported the idea that he should remain in office. Thomas Rivera Schatz, President of the Puerto Rican Senate, called upon Rosselló and every government official included in the chat to resign, but not before supporting the Governor's position to remain in office, and downplaying the protests calling for Rosselló's resignation as a "small" group of people that are "always protesting". Calls for his resignation were made by Democratic U.S. Representative Raúl Grijalva, chair of the House Natural Resources Committee; former governor Sila María Calderón, former governor Luis Fortuño, former Secretary of the U.S. Department of Housing and Urban Development, and presidential contender Julian Castro, and Democratic U.S. Representative and presidential contender Tulsi Gabbard.

On July 17, 2019, an estimated 500,000 people participated in a mass protest in Old San Juan calling for Rosselló to resign as governor. Artists such Ricky Martin were present. Protests were also held in other cities and countries, including London, Santiago, Montreal, Seattle, New York City, Boston, Orlando, Amsterdam, Barcelona, Madrid, Stockholm, Paris, Slovenia, Norway, and Vienna.

On July 24, 2019, after previously defending the Governor and refusing to impeach him, the Puerto Rico Legislative Assembly announced that they would immediately begin impeachment proceedings unless Rosselló resigned. Later that day he announced that he would resign as governor of Puerto Rico effective 5 pm AST August 2, to be replaced by Justice Secretary Wanda Vázquez Garced until she reportedly declined the position.

In his last minutes in office, Rosselló nominated Pedro Pierluisi as Secretary of State of Puerto Rico, with the intention of Pierluisi becoming Puerto Rico's next governor.

In 2020, the Special Independent Prosecutor's Panel appointed a special independent prosecutor to investigate the controversy. During the investigation police officers seized several cell phones and laptops that had been used by the alleged members of the chat. Analysis of the devices was extremely limited as officers were not granted an official warrant, and as such could not legally require the owners of the devices to share their passwords. Despite this, officers were still able to access some information, According to the investigation report, officers were able to determine that several of the devices were involved in the group chat at some point, but were unable to find any specific messages or contents of that chat, suggesting that all messages had been erased. The investigation was unable to determine when the chat's contents were deleted, which meant there wasn't enough evidence to charge the device's owners with destruction of evidence. During the investigation, the prosecutor received a "pen drive" from Raul Maldonado Nieves, (the son of Roselló's Secretary of the Treasury, Raul Maldonado Gautier.) Investigation of this drive found that it too had been tampered with. "The result of the evaluation is that this document is a copy of one that was created on January 20, 2019 and modified on July 12, 2019. By not delivering the original requested, it is not possible to determine its origin and what the modification made consisted of." The FEI's report concluded that all collected documentation of the chat was “not original, edited, and manipulated," but found that there was insufficient evidence to criminally prosecute any party involved and prove their guilt "beyond a reasonable doubt." During his governorship, Rosselló was elected to be the president of the Council of State Governments (CSG), apart from being awarded the education policymaker of the year and recognized for outstanding achievements in public health.

== Post-governorship career ==
Since 2022, Rosselló has been a chief operating officer at the Regenerative Medicine Institute (RMI) in Costa Rica. He also teaches a topic called “Leadership in Crisis” at the George Mason University and researches on genetic manipulation of stem cells at the Ana G. Méndez University in Puerto Rico. In 2021, he received 53,823 write-in votes as a congressional shadow delegation member. Rosselló did not take a salary when elected as a write-in candidate.

== Awards and honors ==
At MIT he was the university tennis captain and was named 2000-2001 Scholar All-America in 2001. He was awarded the Top Ten Outstanding Young Persons from JCI International for his research. During his governorship in 2019, he was elected to be the president of the Council of State Governments (CSG), awarded the Gerente de Política Pública (education policymaker of the year), and was recognized for outstanding achievements in public health.

== Personal life ==
Rosselló was married to Natasha Marie Cervi from 2008 to 2010.

On October 14, 2012, Rosselló married Beatriz Areizaga in a ceremony held in New Orleans, Louisiana. The couple have two children: a daughter, Claudia Beatriz, and a son, Pedro Javier.

His cousin is Roy Rosselló, a singer and former member of the boy band Menudo.

=== Ancestry ===
Ancestors of Ricardo Rosselló

8. Pedro Juan Rosselló Batle; b. 1874 – Alaró, Majorca, Balearic Islands, Spain
4. Juan Antonio Rosselló Matanzo; b. 1913 – San Juan, Puerto Rico
18. José Matanzo; b. Trujillo Alto, Puerto Rico
9. Jacobina Matanzo Torres Vallejo; b. c. 1882 – Trujillo Alto, Puerto Rico
19. Natividad Torres Vallejo; b. Trujillo Alto, Puerto Rico
2. Pedro Rosselló; b. 1944 – San Juan, Puerto Rico
10. Eugenio González González; b. Aguada, Puerto Rico
5. Iris Marta González Paz; b. 1919 – Rosario, Aguada, Puerto Rico
11. Mercedes Paz Feria; b. Aguada, Puerto Rico
1. Ricardo Rosselló; b. 1979 – San Juan, Puerto Rico
12. Óscar Nevárez y López; b. c. 1888 – Puerto Rico
6. Óscar Nevárez del Valle; b. c. 1919 – Toa Baja, Puerto Rico
13. Margarita del Valle y Olmedes; b. c. 1895 – Media Luna, Toa Baja, Puerto Rico
3. Maga Nevárez Padilla; b. San Juan, Puerto Rico
7. Irma Padilla

== Bibliography ==
- Rosselló Nevares, Ricardo (2012). Un mejor Puerto Rico es posible: el problema y la oportunidad de la colonia (in Spanish). San Juan, Puerto Rico: La Editorial, Universidad de Puerto Rico. ISBN 978-0-8477-0481-1.
- Nevares, Ricardo Rosselló (October 29, 2024). "The reformer's dilemma : and the need for a radical middle". WorldCat.org.

== See also ==
- List of Puerto Ricans

Party political offices
Preceded by Pedro Pierluisi	Chair of the Puerto Rico New Progressive Party; 2016–2019	Succeeded by Thomas Rivera Schatz; Acting
Preceded by Luis Fortuño	New Progressive nominee for Governor of Puerto Rico; 2016	Succeeded by Pedro Pierluisi
Political offices
Preceded by Alejandro García Padilla	Governor of Puerto Rico; 2017–2019	Succeeded by Pedro Pierluisi; De facto
U.S. House of Representatives
Preceded by Charlie Rodríguez	Shadow Member of the U.S. House of Representatives from Puerto Rico; 2021–2025	Vacant
