= Sila María Calderón =

Governor of Puerto Rico from 2001 to 2005

Sila Calderón
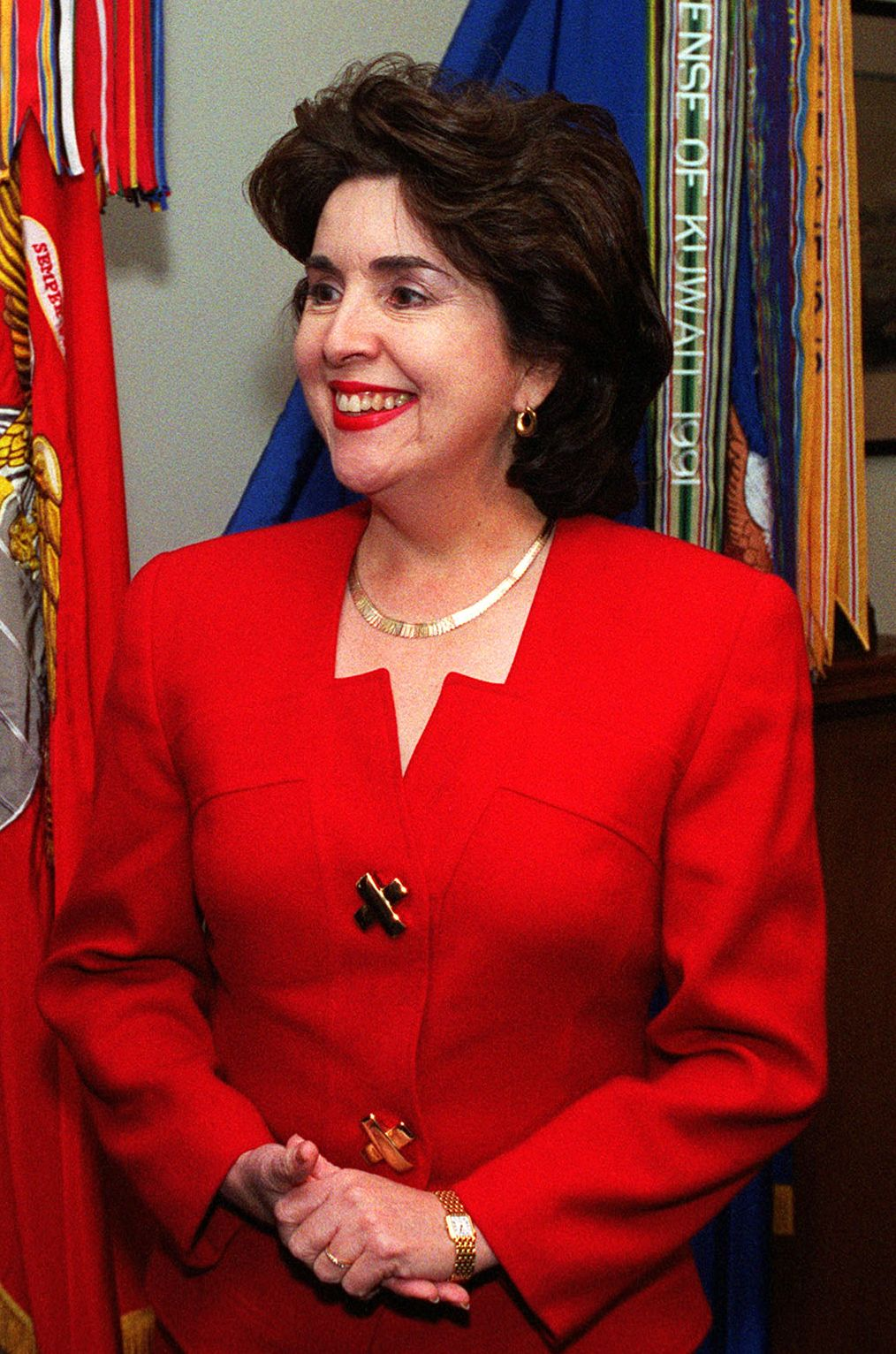
- Calderón in 2001

Governor of Puerto Rico
- In office January 2, 2001 – January 2, 2005
- Preceded by: Pedro Rosselló
- Succeeded by: Aníbal Acevedo Vilá

Mayor of San Juan
- In office January 2, 1997 – January 2, 2001
- Preceded by: Héctor Luis Acevedo
- Succeeded by: Jorge Santini

Secretary of State of Puerto Rico
- In office 1988–1989
- Governor: Rafael Hernández Colón
- Preceded by: Alfonso Lopez Chaar
- Succeeded by: Antonio Colorado

Personal details
- Born: Sila María Calderón Serra; September 23, 1942 (age 83) San Juan, Puerto Rico
- Party: Popular Democratic
- Other political affiliations: Democratic
- Spouses: Francisco González (m. 1964; div. 1975); Adolfo Krans (m. 1978; div. 2001); Ramón Cantero Frau (m. 2003; div. 2005)
- Children: 3, including Sila
- Education: Manhattanville College (BA); University of Puerto Rico, Río Piedras (attended)

Sila María Calderón Serra (born September 23, 1942) is a Puerto Rican politician, businesswoman, and philanthropist who served as the eighth democratically elected governor of Puerto Rico from 2001 to 2005. Calderón became the first female to be elected or serve as governor since the establishment of the office in 1508. She previously served as the mayor of San Juan, the capital municipality of Puerto Rico, from 1997 to 2001. She also held various positions in the government of Puerto Rico, including Secretary of State from 1988 to 1989.

== Early life and education ==
Sila Calderón Serra was born in San Juan, Puerto Rico on September 23, 1942, to entrepreneur César Augusto Calderón and Sila Serra Jesús. Her maternal grandfather Miguel Serra Joy emigrated from Mallorca, Balearic Islands to Puerto Rico in the late 19th century which granted Calderón Spanish citizenship in 2012. She attended high school at the Colegio Sagrado Corazón de Las Madres in Santurce, Puerto Rico. In 1964 she graduated with honors from Manhattanville College in Purchase, New York, with a Bachelor of Arts degree in Government. She later attended the Graduate School of Public Administration at the University of Puerto Rico.

== Professional career ==
=== First career years: 1973–1985 ===
Her career began in 1973 when she was named Executive Aide to the Labor Secretary, Luis Silva Recio. Two years later, she was named Special Aide for Economic Development to then Governor, Rafael Hernández Colón.

After Hernández Colón was defeated in the 1976 general elections, Calderón went to work on the private sector working as Director of Business Development at Citibank, N.A. in San Juan. At the time, Citibank in San Juan was one of John Reed's experimental marketing centers. As part of her business development responsibilities, Calderón designed and marketed several new consumer products which significantly increased the earnings of the Retail Division of the Bank. In 1978, she became president of Commonwealth Investment Company, a family real estate concern that owned and managed industrial buildings.

=== First government positions: 1985–1990 ===
In 1984, Rafael Hernández Colón was again elected governor and he appointed Calderón as Chief of Staff, being the first woman in that position. In 1988, Hernández Colón named her Puerto Rico's 12th Secretary of State.

During this time, Calderón was also part of the Governor's Economic Adviser Council and the board of directors of the Puerto Rico Government Development Bank and the Center for Specialized Studies in Government Management. She also presided the Inversions Committee of the Industrial Development Company. She was also Secretary General of the Commission that organized the activities of the Fifth Centenary of the Discovery of the Americas.

=== Return to private life: 1989–1995 ===
Calderón resigned in 1989 and returned to her business endeavors. She served on the boards of major local corporations such as BanPonce, Banco Popular, and Pueblo International. She also served as part of the Committee for Economic Development of Puerto Rico, the Sor Isolina Ferré Foundation, and as President of the Puerto Rico Public Broadcasting Corporation during 1991 and 1992.

== Political career ==
=== Mayor of San Juan: 1997–2001 ===
Calderón returned to public life in 1995, running in the Popular Democratic Party (PPD) primary for Mayor of San Juan. She won the primary handily over her two opponents by a huge margin. After that, she became President of the Municipal Committee of the PPD in San Juan, and later became part of the board of directors of the Party.

In the 1996 mayoral general election, she was elected Mayor of San Juan, becoming the second woman in the city's history to serve in that office and the first woman elected to the position. As mayor, she undertook one of the largest public works program in the city to date, sponsoring various urban redevelopment projects to revitalize Old San Juan, Condado, Río Piedras, Santurce, and other deteriorated sections of the city. She also initiated the Special Communities Program to assist poor communities’ empowerment and economic development.

=== Governor: 2001–2004 ===
On April 21, 1999, Calderón presented her candidacy to be Governor of Puerto Rico. On May 31, she won the primary and took the presidency of the party, with then-President Aníbal Acevedo Vilá assuming the role of Vice-president. Acevedo Vilá eventually became Calderón's running mate for Resident Commissioner of Puerto Rico.

In 2000, Calderón led the Popular Democratic Party (PPD) during a close campaign for governor against Carlos Pesquera (PNP) and Rubén Berríos (PIP). Calderón was elected governor, becoming the first elected female governor in the history of Puerto Rico. After being sworn in, Calderón appointed her two daughters, Sila Mari and María Elena, to serve as First Ladies.

As governor, Calderón took action to help the most disadvantaged communities. With the passing of Law 1 of 2001 the government invested $1 billion to create the Puerto Rico Office for Socioeconomic and Community Development with the intention of developing the marginalized communities of the island. The program intended to create 14,500 development projects in 686 communities. The program has been criticized for many of the projects never being completed and funds instead being diverted.

In 2003, Calderón announced her determination to fulfill the commitments of her platform and her decision not to seek re-election in 2004.

On May 26, 2004, Calderón had to deal with a man who entered La Fortaleza, the governor's mansion, with a knife and took a receptionist hostage, demanding to speak directly with Calderón. After Calderón negotiated with the hostage taker, the man dropped the knife and surrendered to the police.

== Present ==
Calderón is a partner in Inter-American Global Links, Inc. (IGlobaL), a business and trade consulting firm with links in Central America, the Caribbean and the United States. She chairs a philanthropic Foundation which has establish a non-profit and non-partisan entity – The Center for Puerto Rico: Sila M. Calderón Foundation – which gives attention to the issues of poverty, women, urban revitalization, ethical values and social responsibility.

== Honours and awards ==
During her career, Calderón has received many honors and awards:

- The Puerto Rico Chamber of Commerce named her Outstanding Woman in the Public Sector three times (1975, 1985, 1987).
- In 2005, she was named as one of the Distinguished Women of the Year by the Product Association of Puerto Rico.
- In 1987, she was granted the Order of Isabella the Catholic by Juan Carlos I, King of Spain.
- In 1988, she was selected Leader of the Year in the field of Public Works by the American Public Works Association, Chapter of Puerto Rico.
- In 2003, she received the Harvard Foundation Award.
- In 2004, she received the Golden Plate Award from the Academy of Achievement in Washington, DC.

Calderón has also received several honorary degrees:

- 1989 – Manhattanville College – Doctor in Arts and Humanities
- May 1997 – Manhattanville College – Doctor of Humane Letters
- May 2001 – Boston University – Doctor of Laws
- May 2001 – New School University – Doctor of Laws

During her tenure, Calderón gave particular attention to strengthening the economic, commercial and cultural ties between Puerto Rico and its Latin American neighbors. Underlining this effort, official visits were paid by Governor Calderón to the Dominican Republic, Panama and Costa Rica in the years 2001, 2002 and 2004. In recognition of her administration's efforts of collaboration between these countries and Puerto Rico, their governments bestowed upon her their most important civil orders: the Order of Merit of Duarte, Sánchez and Mella of the Dominican Republic; the Order of Núñez de Balboa of Panama; and the Order of Juan Santamaría of Costa Rica.

== Personal life ==
Calderón was married to engineer Francisco Xavier González Goenaga from 1964 to 1975. They had three children together: Sila María, Francisco Xavier, and María Elena. Both Sila María and María Elena are attorneys, and they served as "First Ladies" of the Commonwealth during Calderón's governorship. Francisco is an investment banker at RBC Capital Markets.

In 1978, Calderón married entrepreneur Adolfo Krans. They divorced in 2001 after 23 years of marriage.

Calderón married again, during her tenure as governor, with Ramón Cantero Frau, her former Secretary of the Department of Economic Development. The wedding was celebrated on September 10, 2003. They were divorced two years later.

== See also ==
- List of governors of Puerto Rico
- History of women in Puerto Rico
- List of female governors in the United States

Political offices
| Preceded by Alfonso Lopez Chaar | Secretary of State of Puerto Rico; 1988–1989 | Succeeded by Antonio Colorado |
| Preceded by Héctor Luis Acevedo | Mayor of San Juan; 1997–2001 | Succeeded by Jorge Santini |
| Preceded by Pedro Rosselló | Governor of Puerto Rico; 2001–2005 | Succeeded by Aníbal Acevedo Vilá |
Party political offices
| Preceded by Aníbal Acevedo Vilá | Chair of the Puerto Rico Popular Democratic Party; 1999–2003 | Succeeded by Aníbal Acevedo Vilá |
| Preceded by Héctor Luis Acevedo | Popular Democratic nominee for Governor of Puerto Rico; 2000 | Succeeded by Aníbal Acevedo Vilá |
