= Pedro Rosselló =

Governor of Puerto Rico from 1993 to 2001

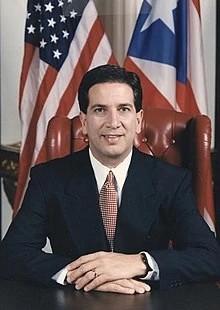
- Rosselló in 1993

Shadow Member of the U.S. House of Representatives from Puerto Rico
- In office August 15, 2017 – July 22, 2019
- Preceded by: Seat established
- Succeeded by: Mayita Meléndez (2021)

Member of the Puerto Rico Senate from the 3rd district
- In office January 4, 2005 – January 2, 2009
- Preceded by: Víctor David Loubriel
- Succeeded by: Ángel Martínez Santiago

Governor of Puerto Rico
- In office January 2, 1993 – January 2, 2001
- Preceded by: Rafael Hernández Colón
- Succeeded by: Sila María Calderón

Chair of the Democratic Governors Association
- In office 1997–1998
- Preceded by: Howard Dean
- Succeeded by: Frank O'Bannon

Personal details
- Born: Pedro Juan Rosselló González; April 5, 1944 (age 82) San Juan, Puerto Rico, U.S.
- Party: New Progressive
- Other political affiliations: Democratic
- Spouse: Maga Nevares (m. 1969)
- Children: 3, including Ricky
- Education: University of Notre Dame (BS); Yale University (MD); University of Puerto Rico, San Juan (MPH); University of Turabo (EdD)

Pedro Juan Rosselló González (Latin American Spanish: [roseˈʝo]; born April 5, 1944) is a Puerto Rican physician and politician who served two consecutive terms as the seventh democratically elected governor of Puerto Rico from 1993 to 2001. Rosselló was president of the New Progressive Party (PNP) from 1991 to 1999 and 2003 to 2008. He was also a member of the Senate of Puerto Rico for the district of Arecibo from 2005 to 2008. His son, Ricardo, was governor of Puerto Rico from 2017 to 2019.

In 1988, Rosselló ran for Resident Commissioner of Puerto Rico, but lost to Jaime Fuster. From 1990 to 1991, he successfully challenged former Governor Carlos Romero Barceló for the presidency of the New Progressive Party (PNP). As governor from 1992 to 2001, he served as president of the Council of State Governments, and chairman of the Southern Governors' Association and the Democratic Governors Association.

In 2003, Rosselló won the PNP gubernatorial nomination for the 2004 general elections against PNP President Carlos Pesquera, but lost the governorship to Anibal Acevedo Vilá by a disputed razor-thin margin. From 2005 to 2008, Rosselló filled a vacant seat left in the Senate of Puerto Rico from the district of Arecibo. As a senator, he unsuccessfully tried to replace Kenneth McClintock as the Senate President. Rosselló lost the PNP gubernatorial nomination for the 2008 general elections to Resident Commissioner Luis Fortuño, who was elected governor. During the governorship of his son Ricardo from 2017 to 2019, he served as a shadow member to the United States House of Representatives from Puerto Rico.

== Early life and education ==
Rosselló González was born in San Juan on April 5, 1944, to Juan Antonio Rosselló Matanzo (1913–2001) and Iris M. González Paz (1919–2012). Rosselló's paternal grandfather Pedro Juan Rosselló Batle migrated in 1902 at the age of 23 from Lloseta, Mallorca, in the Balearic Islands, Spain; his brother Juan had also left for Puerto Rico a year earlier.

After completing his elementary and secondary education at Academia Santa Teresita and Academia del Perpetuo Socorro, both located in San Juan, Rosselló moved to the mainland United States to attend college. He earned his Bachelor of Science degree, magna cum laude at the University of Notre Dame in 1966, as well as several academic and athletic distinctions. After graduation, he continued his studies in medicine at Yale University, which he completed in 1970, also graduating Magna Cum Laude. Later he specialized in general and pediatric surgery at Harvard University. Following his residency at Harvard, he practiced medicine in Puerto Rico while also attending the University of Puerto Rico, Medical Sciences Campus where he earned a master's degree in Public Health (MPH) in 1981 (also graduating Magna Cum Laude). In 2011, he began studying toward a Doctor of Education in Education Leadership from the University of Turabo, graduating in 2015. During his college years, Rosselló became an avid tennis player that led him to be named the captain of Notre Dame's Men's tennis team, a P.R. 5-time-Mens-Champion, and also to play for Puerto Rico's team in regional championships, including the Central American and Caribbean Games. He was inducted into the Puerto Rico Tennis Hall of Fame in 2004.

== Early career ==
Rosselló started his professional career alternating as an instructor at Harvard Medical School and as an assistant professor at the University of Puerto Rico, Medical Sciences Campus, where he would later become an associate professor.

He became chief of pediatric surgery and later chief surgeon at the University of Puerto Rico Children's Hospital. In 1985, Rosselló was named Health Services Director for the city of San Juan by then Mayor Baltasar Corrada del Río.

== Political career ==
=== Run for resident commissioner ===
Rosselló began his political career in 1988 when he ran for the office of Resident Commissioner of Puerto Rico, (the island's non-voting observer/representative in the United States Congress) losing to incumbent Jaime Fuster of the Popular Democratic Party (PPD). Nevertheless, he was the candidate from the New Progressive Party (PNP) for whom the most votes were cast in the 1988 elections. This positioned him well to become the party's next leader.

After leading a "Statehood Crusade" throughout the islands of Puerto Rico, in 1991 he became president of the PNP, successfully leading an opposition to a referendum sponsored by the then Puerto Rico's Governor Rafael Hernández Colón. In 1992 he successfully ran for Governor of Puerto Rico, defeating Victoria Muñoz Mendoza of the PPD.

=== Governor (1993–2001) ===
As governor, Rosselló launched an anti-crime campaign known as "Mano Dura Contra el Crimen" (literally, "Strong hand against crime") in which the Puerto Rico National Guard was used to assist state police in deterring the ever-increasing crime wave that had begun in the late 1980s. This crime-fighting initiative supposedly managed to reduce violent crimes in half by the time he left office in Jan. 2001, but the figures are disputed due to poor recordkeeping and extensive juking of crime statistics by Puerto Rican police. The U.S. Department of Justice would document these problems with Puerto Rico's police force in a 2011 report. There were also widespread incidents of police brutality, as Rosselló and Police Superintendent Pedro Toledo aggressively deployed riot police against political protests. These protests arose over litany of controversies that marred Rosselló's government, including the privatization of the island's utilities, massive cost overruns and contract disputes on development projects, and several corruption scandals involving top cabinet officials. Among the officials convicted was Edison Misla Aldarondo, who served as speaker of the Puerto Rico House of Representatives during Rosselló's administration. In January 2003, a federal jury convicted Misla Aldarondo of extortion, money laundering and obstruction of justice arising from his use of political influence to assist investors seeking to purchase a government-owned hospital. He was sentenced to 71 months in prison and three years of supervised release, fined $12,500 and ordered to forfeit $147,400. The United States Court of Appeals for the First Circuit upheld his conviction and sentence in 2007. After Rosselló left office, crime rates either returned to pre-Mano Dura levels or successive governments simply reported more accurate crime statistics. Violent crime declined by a similar extent across the US during that period, but Puerto Rico's crime rate blew past pre-Rosselló levels throughout the 2000s and 2010s. He also worked to eradicate drug traffic in Puerto Rico Publics School on his campaign "Zona Libre de Drogas" (Drug-Free Zone). The Rosselló government was never able to address the extensive penetration by narcotraffickers of the police and local government, and by 2010 Puerto Rico had one of the highest gun homicide rates in the world, a figure largely driven by drug crime. His administration was also characterized for investing in large-scale, controversial infrastructure projects which included a train system, dubbed Tren Urbano, and a new convention center in San Juan, now officially named the Pedro Rosselló Convention Center. His policies also included a push towards reducing the size of government and taking government out of areas in which it should not act as a direct competitor of the private sector. His administration reduced the unemployment to less than 11% in 2000 creating thousands of jobs during his 8 years of government. Most of these government and private sector jobs disappeared in the 2000s as the island's debt problem, largely unaddressed during Rosselló's administration, spiraled out of control and forced later governments to purge civil service rolls and resort to regressive tax measures to raise revenue. Some other large-scale infrastructure projects were the Coliseum of Puerto Rico, the Museum of Art of Puerto Rico, Highway 66, and the SuperAcueducto.

Under his administration, a healthcare reform bill was approved. Rosselló's Health Reform made Puerto Rico one of the few jurisdictions in the entire world to have had virtually 100% of its population covered by health insurance. Additionally, under this Reform, Puerto Rico became the only jurisdiction in the US to have nearly 100% of its infants under the age of 2 vaccinated. He led two campaigns for Puerto Rican statehood in 1993 and 1998 in which locally enacted plebiscites were held to consult the Puerto Rican electorate on the political status with the United States. He supported the congressional Young Bill, which sought to carry out a referendum in Puerto Rico to define the political status of the island. However, the bill died in committee in the Senate of the United States. Nevertheless, Rosselló carried out a non-binding plebiscite in 1998 which gave electors four options and a fifth None of the Above column. The opposing Popular Democratic Party led a campaign to boycott the plebiscite and called the electorate to vote for the None of the Above column. The boycott was successful, as the None of the Above column – which did not represent any kind support for any status option – garnered 50.3% of the total votes.

In the 1996 elections he defeated rivals Héctor Luis Acevedo (PPD) who was mayor of San Juan at the time, and Representative David Noriega (PIP), winning a second term after obtaining more than one million votes and the largest victory margin since 1964.

In 1998, a 45% stake of the state-owned Puerto Rico Telephone Company (PRTC) was sold to a consortium led by GTE (now Verizon) and Banco Popular de Puerto Rico, with another stake set aside to benefit all of the company's employees. This sale led to a general strike organized by several labor unions. A similar attempt to privatize PRTC in 1988, under then Governor Rafael Hernández Colón, led to a similar strike which doomed the sale. The Telecommunications Act of 1996 deregulated the monopolies many regional telephone and cable television companies held. From then on, PRTC's telecommunications monopoly would no longer be able to properly compete in the environment and the losses to the government would have been onerous. The sale price was 2 billion dollars, which union leaders described as "ridiculously low" (PRTC generated about a 100 million dollars of yearly profit at the time of the sale). The privatization of PRTC led to the 1998 Puerto Rican general strike.

Rosello's last term as governor (1998–2001) was plagued with numerous political scandals, many of them related to the use of public funds for personal gain by government officials as well as by members of Rosello's PNP political party. Among the charges was the use of government funds that had been allocated for treating Puerto Ricans suffering from AIDS which were instead used to finance Rosello's political campaign. Some funds intended for public education were also diverted for personal or party gain. After a new governor took over in 2001 (Sila María Calderón Serra) more evidence of Rosello-era scandals was still coming to light.

=== Corruption cases involving administration officials ===
Rosselló's two terms as governor, from 1993 to 2001, were marked by several corruption investigations involving members of his administration, legislators from the governing New Progressive Party (PNP), municipal officials and government contractors. Contemporary reporting estimated that approximately two dozen officials associated with his administration were eventually convicted. Rosselló was not charged or convicted in connection with these cases.

Among the most prominent cases was that of Víctor Fajardo, who served as secretary of education during Rosselló's administration. Fajardo pleaded guilty to federal charges arising from a scheme in which Department of Education contracts were awarded in exchange for kickbacks. Participating contractors paid approximately ten percent of the value of certain contracts, and Fajardo personally received millions of dollars. He was sentenced to twelve years in federal prison and served approximately ten years before his release.

María de los Ángeles Rivera Rangel, an executive assistant in the governor's office, was convicted in 2002 of conspiracy and extortion. She used her position to provide government contractors with access to agency officials and expedited treatment of permits and other government business in exchange for payments. Her conviction was subsequently upheld in federal appellate proceedings.

Former PNP senator Freddy Valentín later pleaded guilty to conspiracy and extortion charges involving a scheme at the Puerto Rico Department of Housing. Prosecutors accused Valentín of receiving payments in exchange for helping contractors obtain preferential treatment from government agencies. The conduct occurred while he chaired the Senate committee responsible for reviewing executive appointments.

Edison Misla Aldarondo, who served as speaker of the Puerto Rico House of Representatives during part of Rosselló's administration, was convicted by a federal jury in January 2003 of extortion, money laundering and obstruction of justice. The charges arose from his use of political influence to assist investors seeking to purchase a government-owned hospital. He was sentenced to 71 months in prison and three years of supervised release, fined $12,500 and ordered to forfeit $147,400. The United States Court of Appeals for the First Circuit upheld his conviction and sentence in 2007.

PNP senator Víctor "El Búho" Marrero Padilla was convicted in a Puerto Rico court in October 2000 of illegally appropriating public funds intended to purchase an air-conditioning unit for a medical clinic at the Ramón Marín Solá public-housing development in Arecibo. The conviction resulted in his departure from the Senate.

Federal authorities also investigated alleged corruption surrounding a $56 million computerization contract for the Municipal Revenue Collections Center. In 2000, a federal grand jury indicted eighteen defendants, including two PNP mayors, alleging that approximately $800,000 in illegal payments had been collected from vendors providing the computer system. The defendants included municipal officials, contractors and intermediaries rather than members of Rosselló's cabinet.

The investigations became a major political issue during the 2000 election, contributing to criticism of the governing party and affecting the campaign of PNP gubernatorial nominee Carlos Pesquera. The prosecutions concerned several separate criminal schemes, and Rosselló was not personally charged in the cases described above.

=== Vieques controversy ===
In April 1999, a U.S. Navy bomber misfired its missiles at a practice range and struck the main watch-post on the island of Vieques, killing David Sanes, a civilian employee of the Navy. The protests that followed on the small island gathered international attention (see Navy-Vieques protests). Governor Rosselló supported the immediate exit of the Navy, appearing before the Senate Armed Services Committee pressing the Senators, among them John Warner and James Inhofe, to immediately take action so that the Navy could withdraw its troops from the island. In 2000, Rosselló and then President Bill Clinton signed an agreement that the Navy would withdraw from Vieques by the year 2003, if voters in Vieques ratified the agreement in a referendum. The agreement included $40 million in public works in Vieques. After Clinton and Rosselló left office, the administration of the next Governor of Puerto Rico, Sila Calderón, rescinded this agreement. Despite political grandstanding from the Calderón administration calling of an earlier withdrawal, the Navy left Vieques on May 1, 2003, the same date President Clinton and Governor Rosselló had agreed upon.

After finishing his term, amid controversy over the growing number of corruption cases involving members of his party and administration, Rosselló moved to the Boston area where he taught on the faculty of the Harvard Kennedy School at Harvard University. He later moved to Virginia, where he first served as a fellow at the Woodrow Wilson International Center for Scholars and later taught public health at George Washington University in Washington, D.C.

In 2003, Rosselló returned to politics and won his party's nomination for the gubernatorial candidacy in a primary election against his successor as PNP leader, Carlos Pesquera. In the 2004 Puerto Rico Elections the PNP won majorities in both houses of the Legislature, the mayorships of 42 of the island's 78 municipalities and the Resident Commissioner post in the U.S. Congress. However, the position of governor was given then to incumbent Resident Commissioner Aníbal Acevedo Vilá who won by razor-thin margin in a highly controversial PR Supreme Court decision that many still hold was politically motivated.

=== Senator (2005–09) ===
Prior to assuming office as Senator, Rosselló had announced his intention to remove Senate President Kenneth McClintock and be elected to replace him. An internal power struggle within the New Progressive Party between Rosselló and McClintock led to a split within the NPP Senate delegation in May 2005. After a caucus meeting, eleven of the seventeen senators elected by the New Progressive Party voted for Rosselló, with the other six boycotting the meeting. McClintock and five other senators, Orlando Parga, Luz Arce, Migdalia Padilla, Carlos Díaz, and Jorge de Castro Font, refused to follow the caucus' decision, denying the unanimous consent required by Senate Rules 2 and 6 to remove a president, thus permitting McClintock to remain as Senate president. The party directorate subsequently recommended that McClintock, Parga, and de Castro Font be expelled from the Party, and that Arce, Padilla, and Díaz be censured and prohibited to run for re-election under the party's flag or logo. However, in August 2005 the party's General Assembly only took action to expel de Castro Font, leaving the status of McClintock and the other four senators in limbo after approving in August 2006 a generic censure resolution that did not name any officeholders by name. The sanctions were nullified by San Juan Superior Court Judge Oscar Dávila Suliveres on May 8, 2007. The Supreme Court of Puerto Rico, in a 5-to-1 decision, affirmed the lower court decision. Three of the disciplined senators (De Castro, Arce, Padilla) who ran for renomination, except for Díaz, were renominated in the March 2008 primary and were re-elected in the general elections.

Rosselló was able to gain a seat in the Senate of Puerto Rico when Victor Loubriel, an elected first-time district senator representing Arecibo, decided to resign his seat two days after being sworn in. The senator's resignation gave the New Progressive Party a seat it could fill, so Rosselló announced his intentions of filling the vacancy and was selected to the post through an internal party procedure. Rosselló officially assumed duties as a Senator of Puerto Rico on February 13, 2005.

On January 16, 2007, Rosselló led the party caucus in the Senate to a reprimand of two more NPP senators, fellow Arecibo senator José Emilio González and Bayamón senator Carmelo Ríos for voting in favor of a concurrent resolution proposing a constitutional amendment that would turn Puerto Rico's bicameral legislature into a unicameral legislative system, increasing the number of reprimanded caucus members to eight of the total of sixteen elected in 2004. Both González and Rios expressed their lack of concern over the reprimand and were handily renominated in the March 2008 primary and reelected in the November 2008 general election.

==== March against U.S. colonialism in Puerto Rico ====
On February 21, 2006, Pedro Rosselló set out to denounce "U.S. persistent colonialism in Puerto Rico" by organizing a march for the end of US colonialism in Puerto Rico (La Marcha por el Fin de la Colonia). The stated purpose of the march was to expose the colonial status of Puerto Rico, and exhort the United States Congress to pass a bill that would allow the self-determination of the people of Puerto Rico, with congressionally mandated non-territorial, non-colonial options. Rosselló is a vocal and prominent supporter of statehood for the island, wanting Puerto Rico to become the 51st state of the (United States). The march covered the complete perimeter of Puerto Rico, tracing its coastline for 16 days and 271.3 miles. The United States Congress has not acted on any requests from the march's organizers.

==== NPP presidency ====
On June 7, 2007, Senator Rosselló officially ended his bid for the Senate presidency, stating in an article in El Vocero newspaper that he was no longer interested in the post, held since 2005 by fellow party member Kenneth McClintock. On April 19, 2007, he published a third book, El Triunvirato del Terror, (The Triumvirate of Terror) on the power centers that he believes control Puerto Rico's economy and government.

On April 28, 2007, Rosselló revealed to various party leaders that in March, 2006, he had signed a sworn statement assuring that he would not make a fourth run for the governorship in 2008, and that he intended to abide by the result. During the April 25, 2007, U.S. House Subcommittee on Insular Affairs hearing on Puerto Rico's political status, he was seen treating McClintock very cordially, which suggests that the tension levels between them had eased somewhat, suggesting he may have wanted to help reunite the party as it prepares for the 2008 electoral campaign against incumbent Governor Aníbal Acevedo Vilá and assume a different non-elective role within the statehood movement to which he has devoted nearly two decades of his life.

==== 2008 NPP governor's candidacy primary ====
During a PNP assembly on May 22, 2007, a large group of delegates unanimously acclaimed him as the party's candidate for governor. However, given his original intention NOT to run, he officially announced that he would allow his name to be placed on the ballot, but he would not carry out a campaign for reelection. His candidacy papers were filed at the State Elections Commission on June 1, 2007. His candidacy was contested by Luis Fortuño, the current Resident Commissioner of Puerto Rico, with whom he had shared the ballot in 2004. Fortuño had also announced officially his pre-candidacy for the party's nomination for governor.

On March 9, 2008, Rosselló conceded the victory to Luis Fortuño after a large margin of votes in favor of his opponent at the primaries.

== Personal life ==
Rosselló married Irma Margarita "Maga" Neváres on August 9, 1969. They have three sons: Juan Oscar (b. 1971), Luis Roberto (b. 1973), and Ricardo Antonio (b. 1979), and several grandchildren. His youngest son, Ricardo became the 12th Governor of Puerto Rico.

One of Rossello's nephews, Roy Rossello, was a member of boy band Menudo.

== Publications ==
- Campos, Cielos y Flamboyanes: Con Pedro Rosselló de 1988 a 1997 – ISBN 1-881714-09-8. Published in 1997.
- El Status es el Issue – biography written by Alberto Goachet and authorized by Rosselló. Published on January 12, 2005.
- The Unfinished Business of American Democracy – published on October 27, 2005.
- El Triunvirato del Terror – published on April 19, 2007

== See also ==
- Voting rights in Puerto Rico

Party political offices
Preceded by Carlos Romero Barceló	Chair of the Puerto Rico New Progressive Party; 1991–1999	Succeeded by Carlos Pesquera
Preceded by Baltasar Corrada del Río	New Progressive nominee for Governor of Puerto Rico; 1992, 1996	Succeeded by Carlos Pesquera
Preceded by Howard Dean	Chair of the Democratic Governors Association; 1997–1998	Succeeded by Frank O'Bannon
Preceded by Carlos Pesquera	Chair of the Puerto Rico New Progressive Party; 2003–2008	Succeeded by Luis Fortuño
Preceded by Carlos Pesquera	New Progressive nominee for Governor of Puerto Rico; 2004	Succeeded by Luis Fortuño
Political offices
Preceded by Rafael Hernández Colón	Governor of Puerto Rico; 1993–2001	Succeeded by Sila Calderón
U.S. House of Representatives
New seat	Shadow Member of the U.S. House of Representatives from Puerto Rico; 2017–2019	Vacant Title next held by Mayita Meléndez; 2021
