= Fourth government of Luis Muñoz Marín =

Fourth cabinet of the Puerto Rican government

Fourth Government of Luis Muñoz Marín
- 4th Constitutional Government of Puerto Rico
- 1961-1965
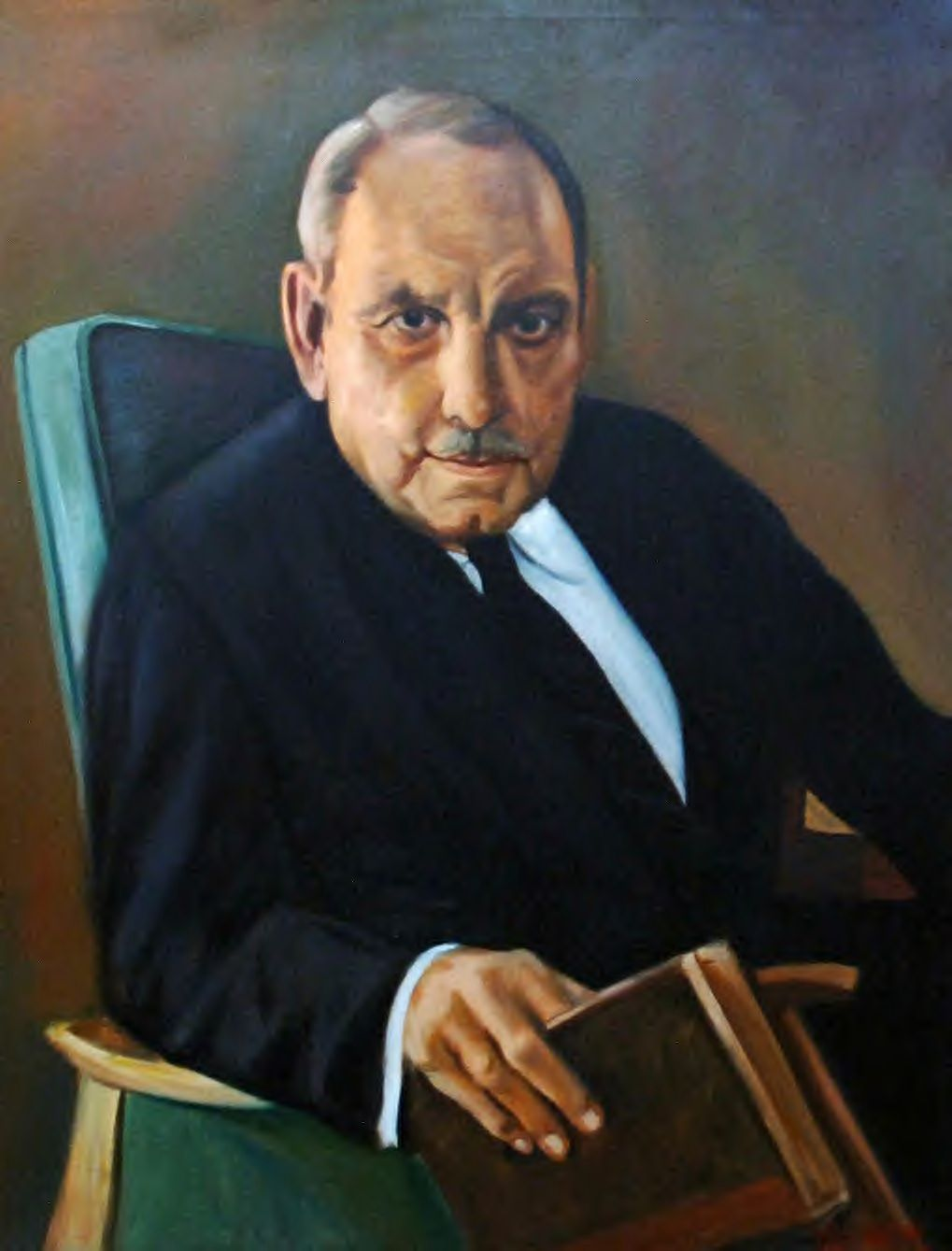
- Governor Muñoz Marín.
- Date formed: 2 January 1961
- Date dissolved: 2 January 1965

People and organisations
- President of the United States of America: Dwight D. Eisenhower; John F. Kennedy; Lyndon B. Johnson
- Governor: Luis Muñoz Marín
- Secretary of State: Roberto Sánchez Vilella
- Total no. of members: 7 Secretaries (Note: Does not include the Governor.); 7 Cabinet Members
- Member party: PPD Ind.
- Status in legislature: Supermajority in both chambers Senate 23 / 32 (72%) House of Representatives 47 / 64 (73%)
- Opposition parties: PER; PAC
- Opposition leaders: Miguel A. García Méndez and Luis A. Ferré Aguayo(PER); Salvador Perea Roselló (PAC)

History
- Incoming formation: 1960 Puerto Rican general election
- Election: 1960 Puerto Rican general election
- Outgoing election: 1964 Puerto Rican general election
- Legislature term: 4th Legislative Assembly of Puerto Rico
- Budgets: 1961 Puerto Rico Budget; 1962 Puerto Rico Budget; 1963 Puerto Rico Budget; 1964 Puerto Rico Budget
- Advice and consent: Senate of Puerto Rico; House of Representatives of Puerto Rico (Note: The House provides advice and consent for the Secretary of State, as he is first in line in the Puerto Rico governor' order of succession as established in Article IV, Section 5, Constitution of Puerto Rico, 1952)
- Predecessor: Third government of Luis Muñoz Marín
- Successor: Government of Roberto Sánchez Vilella

This fourth and last government of Luis Muñoz Marín followed his third reelection. In many ways it was a continuation of the previous government, with one change in positions, the Secretary of Labor, and the same amount of supermajoritarian control of the Senate of Puerto Rico and House of Representatives of Puerto Rico.

Meanwhile the opposition composition shifted, with the entrance of the Partido Acción Cristiana with one senator and one representative, the Puerto Rican Independence Party dropping out of representation thresholds, and the Partido Estadista Republicano solidifying its status as the main opposition party, their presence bolstered by virtue of the effects of Article III, Section 7, Constitution of Puerto Rico, 1952.

== Party breakdown ==
Party breakdown of cabinet members, not including the governor:

- Popular Democratic Party
- Independents
6
1

The cabinet was composed of members of the PPD and two independents or technical positions (or people whose membership in a party was not clearly ascertained from any available media).

== Members of the Cabinet ==
The Puerto Rican Cabinet was led by the Governor alone in this period. The Cabinet was composed of all the Secretaries of the executive departments of the Commonwealth government, which at this time was limited to a small number of offices as delineated initially in the Constitution.

Office	Name	Party	Term
=== Governor ===
Governor of Puerto Rico; Gobernación de Puerto Rico	Luis Muñoz Marín	Popular Democratic Party	24 July 1952 – 2 January 1965
=== Council of Secretaries ===
Secretary of State; Secretaría de Estado	Roberto Sánchez Vilella	Popular Democratic Party	25 July 1952 - 2 January 1965
Secretary of Agriculture, Commerce, and Public Works; Secretaría de Agricultura y Comercio y Obras Públicas	Luis Rivera Santos	Popular Democratic Party	2 January 1957 - 2 January 1965
Secretary of Justice; Secretaría de Justicia	Hiram R. Cancio Vilella	Popular Democratic Party	29 January 1958 - 31 August 1965
Secretary of the Treasury; Secretaría de Hacienda	José R. Nogueras	Popular Democratic Party	1958 - 1963
Secretary of the Treasury; Secretaría de Hacienda	Jorge Font Saldaña	Popular Democratic Party	1964 - 1968
Secretary of Public Instruction; Secretaría de Instrucción Pública	Cándido Oliveras	Popular Democratic Party	31 October 1960 - 2 January 1965
Secretary of Health; Secretaría de Salud	Guillermo Arbona Irizarry	Ind.	25 July 1957 - 2 January 1966
Secretary of Labor; Secretaría del Trabajo	Fernando Sierra Berdecía	Popular Democratic Party	25 July 1952 - 1962
Secretary of Labor; Secretaría del Trabajo	Frank Zorrilla Maldonado	Popular Democratic Party	1962 - 1965

== Notes ==
Preceded by Muñoz Marín (1957-1961)	Government of Puerto Rico; 1961-1965	Succeeded by Sánchez Vilella (1965-1969)
