= Third government of Luis Muñoz Marín =

Third cabinet of the Puerto Rican government

Third Government of Luis Muñoz Marín
- 3rd Constitutional Government of Puerto Rico
- 1957-1961
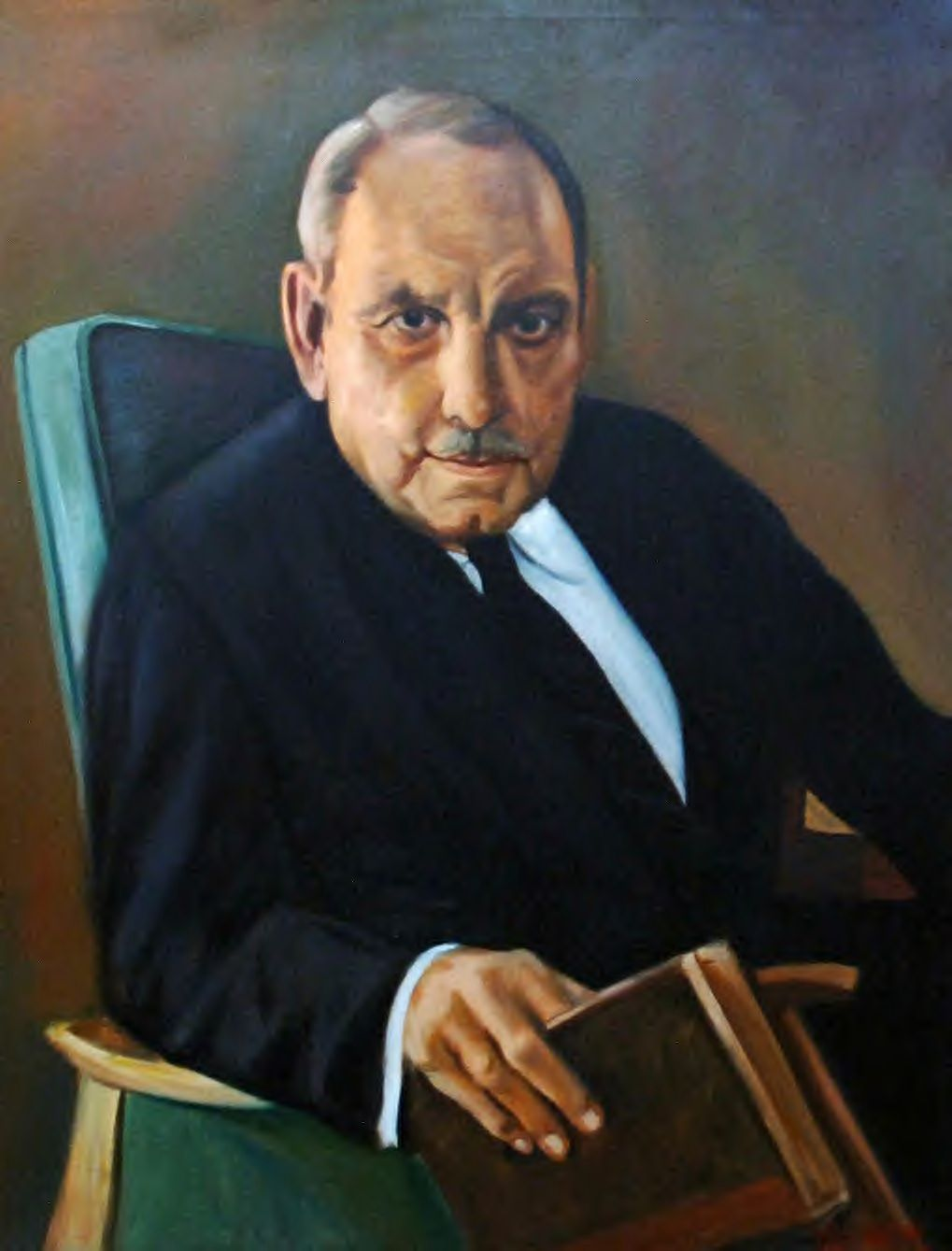
- Governor Muñoz Marín.
- Date formed: 2 January 1957
- Date dissolved: 2 January 1961

People and organisations
- President of the United States of America: Dwight D. Eisenhower
- Governor: Luis Muñoz Marín
- Secretary of State: Roberto Sánchez Vilella
- Total no. of members: 7 Secretaries (Note: Does not include the Governor.); 7 Cabinet Members
- Member party: PPD Ind.
- Status in legislature: Supermajority in both chambers Senate 23 / 32 (72%) House of Representatives 47 / 64 (73%)
- Opposition parties: PER; PIP
- Opposition leaders: Miguel A. García Méndez and Luis A. Ferré Aguayo(PER); Gilberto Concepción de Gracia (PIP)

History
- Election: 1956 Puerto Rican general election
- Outgoing election: 1960 Puerto Rican general election
- Legislature term: 3rd Legislative Assembly of Puerto Rico
- Budgets: 1957 Puerto Rico Budget; 1958 Puerto Rico Budget; 1959 Puerto Rico Budget; 1960 Puerto Rico Budget
- Advice and consent: Senate of Puerto Rico; House of Representatives of Puerto Rico (Note: The House provides advice and consent for the Secretary of State, as he is first in line in the Puerto Rico governor' order of succession as established in Article IV, Section 5 of the Constitution of Puerto Rico (1952))
- Incoming formation: 1956 Puerto Rican general election
- Predecessor: Second government of Luis Muñoz Marín
- Successor: Fourth government of Luis Muñoz Marín

This third government of Luis Muñoz Marín followed his second reelection. In many ways it was a continuation of the previous government, with some changes in positions such as the Secretary of Justice, Agriculture, and the same amount of supermajoritarian control of the Senate of Puerto Rico and House of Representatives of Puerto Rico, while the opposition composition shifted from being led by the Puerto Rican Independence Party to the Partido Estadista Republicano, their presence bolstered by virtue of the effects of Article III, Section 7 of the Constitution of Puerto Rico (1952).

== Party breakdown ==
Party breakdown of cabinet members, not including the governor:

- Popular Democratic Party
- Independents
5
2

The cabinet was composed of members of the PPD and two independents or technical positions (or people whose membership in a party was not clearly ascertained from any available media).

== Members of the Cabinet ==
The Puerto Rican Cabinet was led by the Governor alone in this period. The Cabinet was composed of all the Secretaries of the executive departments of the Commonwealth government, which at this time was limited to a small number of offices as delineated initially in the Constitution.

Office	Name	Party	Term
=== Governor ===
Governor of Puerto Rico; Gobernación de Puerto Rico	Luis Muñoz Marín	Popular Democratic Party	24 July 1952 – 2 January 1965
=== Council of Secretaries ===
Secretary of State; Secretaría de Estado	Roberto Sánchez Vilella	Popular Democratic Party	25 July 1952 - 2 January 1965
Secretary of Agriculture, Commerce, and Public Works; Secretaría de Agricultura y Comercio y Obras Públicas	Luis Rivera Santos	Popular Democratic Party	2 January 1957 - 2 January 1965
Secretary of Justice; Secretaría de Justicia	Juan B. Fernández Badillo	Popular Democratic Party	14 January 1957 - 17 December 1958
Secretary of Justice; Secretaría de Justicia	Hiram R. Cancio Vilella	Popular Democratic Party	29 January 1958 - 31 August 1965
Secretary of the Treasury; Secretaría de Hacienda	José R. Nogueras	Popular Democratic Party	1958 - 1963
Secretary of Public Instruction; Secretaría de Instrucción Pública	Efraín Sánchez Hidalgo	Ind.	1957 - 1960
Secretary of Public Instruction; Secretaría de Instrucción Pública	Cándido Oliveras	Popular Democratic Party	31 October 1960 - 2 January 1965
Secretary of Health; Secretaría de Salud	Guillermo Arbona Irizarry	Ind.	25 July 1957 - 2 January 1966
Secretary of Labor; Secretaría del Trabajo	Fernando Sierra Berdecía	Popular Democratic Party	25 July 1952 - 1962

== Notes ==
Preceded by Muñoz Marín (1953-1957)	Government of Puerto Rico; 1957-1961	Succeeded by Muñoz Marín (1961-1965)
