= Ferré =

Ferré is a surname. Notable people with the surname include:

== In arts and entertainment ==
- Boulou Ferré (born 1951), French virtuoso jazz musician
- Géant Ferré ("Iron Giant"), ring name of French-American wrestler André Roussimoff (1946–1993)
- Gianfranco Ferré (1944–2007), Italian fashion designer
- Helen Aguirre Ferré (born 1957), American journalist
- Juan Francisco Ferré (born 1962), Spanish writer, critic and academic
- Léo Ferré (1916–1993), French-born Monégasque poet and composer
- Manuel García Ferré (1929–2013), Spanish-Argentine animation director and cartoonist
- Marc Ferré (born 1994), Andorran footballer
- Maties Palau Ferré (1921–2000), Spanish painter
- Norbert Ferré (born 1975), French magician and artist manager
- Rosario Ferré (1938–2016), Puerto Rican writer, poet and essayist

== In politics ==
- Jean-Baptiste Ferré (1767–1828), Canadian politician
- José Ferré (1903–1990), Puerto Rican industrialist and politician
- Don Luis Alberto Ferré Aguayo (1904–2003), Puerto Rican industrialist and politician
- Maurice Ferré (born 1935), former mayor of Miami
- Théophile Ferré (1846–1871), member of the Paris Commune

== In other fields ==
- Alberto Methol Ferré (1929–2009), Uruguayan thinker, writer, journalist, teacher, historian and theologian
- Antonio Luis Ferré, Puerto Rican businessman
- Frederick Ferré (1933–2013), American professor of philosophy
- Isolina Ferré (1914–2000), Puerto Rican Roman Catholic religious sister
- Jean Ferré (1929–2006), French art historian and journalist

== See also ==
- BAP Ferré (DM-74), a Peruvian Navy destroyer
- Ferré Foundation, a philanthropic organisation
- Ferré-class submarine, a pair of submarines of the Peruvian Navy in World War I
- Le Ferré, a commune in Brittany, France
- Pizzo Ferrè, an Italian mountain
- Réseau Ferré de France, a French railway network
