= List of Legislative Assemblies of Puerto Rico =

The following is a list of terms of the Legislative Assembly of Puerto Rico, the territorial legislature of the Commonwealth of Puerto Rico.

== Legislatures ==
The following is a list of legislative assemblies, with a count starting on the legislature elected in the 1948 Puerto Rican general election, following the enactment of the Puerto Rico Elective Governor Act of 1947 by president Harry S. Truman.

Name	Start date	End date	Last election
1st Legislative Assembly of Puerto Rico	1949	1953	1948
2nd Legislative Assembly of Puerto Rico	1953	1957	1952
3rd Legislative Assembly of Puerto Rico	1957	1961	1956
4th Legislative Assembly of Puerto Rico	1961	1965	1960
5th Legislative Assembly of Puerto Rico	1965	1969	1964
6th Legislative Assembly of Puerto Rico	1969	1973	1968
7th Legislative Assembly of Puerto Rico	1973	1977	1972
8th Legislative Assembly of Puerto Rico	1977	1981	1976
9th Legislative Assembly of Puerto Rico	1981	1985	1980
10th Legislative Assembly of Puerto Rico	1985	1989	1984
11th Legislative Assembly of Puerto Rico	1989	1993	1988
12th Legislative Assembly of Puerto Rico	1993	1997	1992
13th Legislative Assembly of Puerto Rico	1997	2001	1996
14th Legislative Assembly of Puerto Rico	January 2, 2001	January 1, 2005	November 7, 2000
15th Legislative Assembly of Puerto Rico	January 2, 2005	January 1, 2009	November 2, 2004
16th Legislative Assembly of Puerto Rico	January 2, 2009	January 1, 2013	November 4, 2008
17th Legislative Assembly of Puerto Rico	January 2, 2013	January 1, 2017	November 6, 2012
18th Legislative Assembly of Puerto Rico	January 2, 2017	January 1, 2021	November 8, 2016
19th Legislative Assembly of Puerto Rico	January 2, 2021	January 1, 2025	November 3, 2020
20th Legislative Assembly of Puerto Rico	January 2, 2025	January 1, 2029	November 5, 2024

== See also ==
- List of Speakers of the House of Representatives of Puerto Rico
- List of presidents of the Senate of Puerto Rico
- List of governors of Puerto Rico
- Capitol of Puerto Rico
- Elections in Puerto Rico
- Historical outline of Puerto Rico
- Lists of United States state legislative sessions
