= Villaronga =

Villaronga is a surname. Notable people with the surname include:

- Agustí Villaronga (1953–2023), Spanish film director, screenwriter and actor
- Mariano Villaronga-Toro (1906–1987), Puerto Rican educator
- Raúl G. Villaronga (1938–2021), Puerto Rican politician and military officer

== See also ==
- Casa Wiechers-Villaronga, mansion in Ponce, Puerto Rico
