= 1964 Puerto Rican electoral referendum =

Ballot measure in Puerto Rico

- 3 November 1964

Results
Choice	Votes	%
Yes	310,431	77.54%
No	89,901	22.46%
Valid votes	400,332	100.00%
Invalid or blank votes	0	0.00%
Total votes	400,332	100.00%
Registered voters/turnout	1,002,000	39.95%

A referendum on eliminating special elections to fill vacant seats in the Legislative Assembly was held in Puerto Rico on 3 November 1964, alongside the general elections. The reforms were approved by 77.5% of voters.

== Results ==
Choice	Votes	%
For	310,431	77.54
Against	89,901	22.46
Total	400,332	100.00
Registered voters/turnout	1,002,000	–
Source: Nohlen
