= Senator Mendez =

Senator Mendez (or Méndez) may refer to:

- Juan Mendez (politician) (born 1985), Arizona State Senate
- Lionel Fernández Méndez (1915–1998), Senate of Puerto Rico
- Manuel A. García Méndez (fl. 1920s–1930s), Senate of Puerto Rico
- Olga A. Méndez (1925–2009), New York State Senate
