= 1951 Puerto Rican Constitutional Convention election =

Constitutional Convention elections were held in Puerto Rico on 27 August 1951 to elect the delegates that would participate in the Constitutional Convention held the same year. The elections were boycotted by the Puerto Rican Independence Party as the party did not wish to give the election legitimacy.

== Results ==
Party	Votes	%	Seats
Popular Democratic Party	351,946	82.78	76
Partido Estadista Republicano	50,720	11.93	0
Socialist Party	22,505	5.29	0
Total	425,171	100.00	76
Registered voters/turnout	781,914	–	
Source: Nolla
