= Fundación Luis A. Ferré =

Charitable foundation in Ponce, Puerto Rico

Fundación Luis A. Ferré is a non-profit educational and charitable foundation in Ponce, Puerto Rico. It was established by don Luis A. Ferré, Puerto Rico's first pro-statehood governor, as well as an industrialist and philanthropist. The Foundation operates by a portion of the revenue of the many businesses founded and owned by Ferré. Don Luis, as he was known, founded the Museo de Arte de Ponce, Puerto Rico's foremost art museum, He was also a strong supporter of Centro Sor Isolina Ferré, founded by his sister Isolina Ferré.
