= 1968 Puerto Rican general election =

- November 5, 1968
- Gubernatorial election
- Turnout: 78.41%
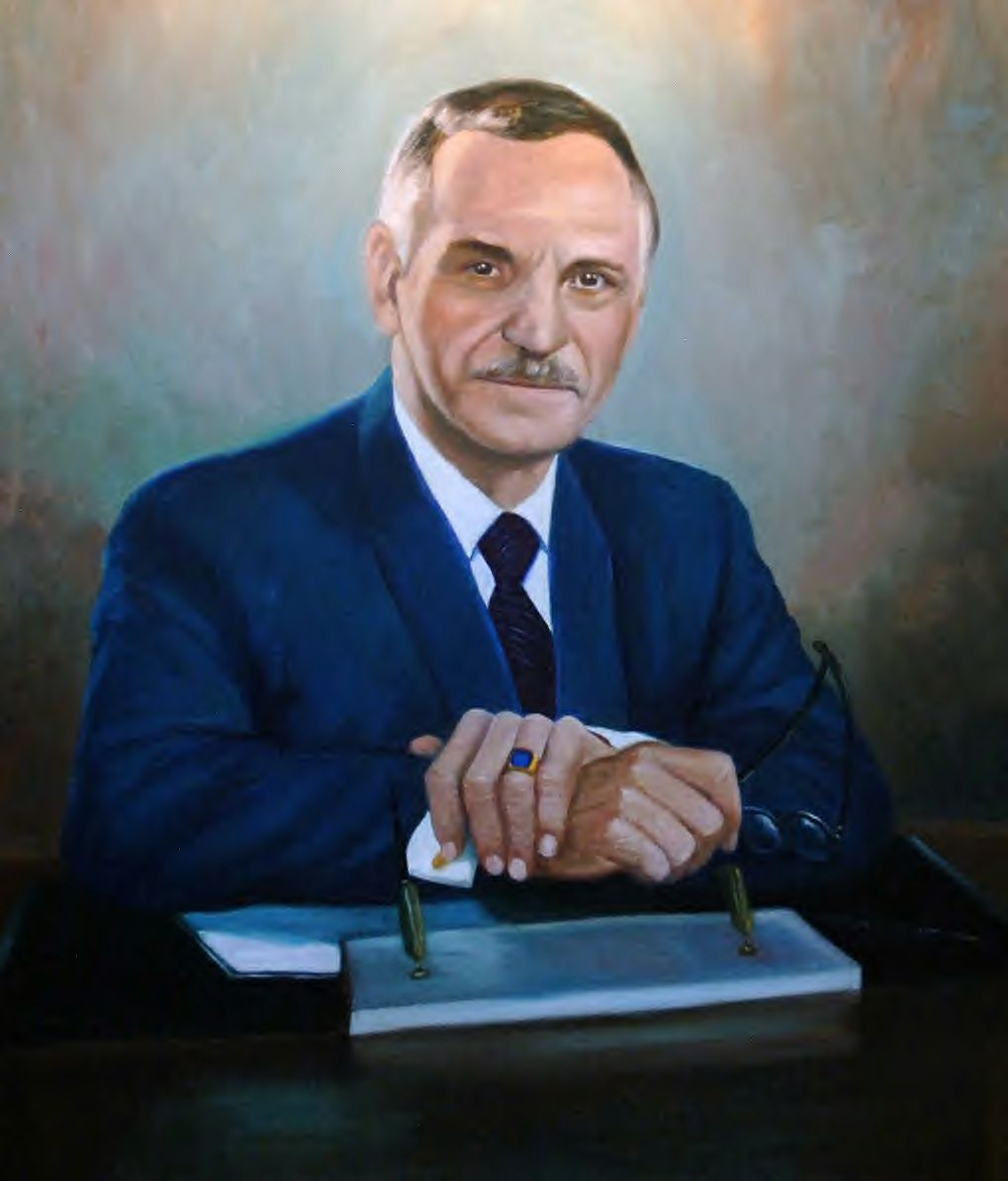

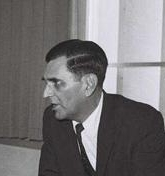
Nominee	Luis A. Ferré	Luis Negrón López	Roberto Sánchez Vilella
Party	New Progressive	Popular Democratic	People's
Popular vote	400,815	374,040	107,359
Percentage	43.62%	40.71%	11.68%
- Results by municipality Ferré: 30–40% 40–50% 50–60% López: 30–40% 40–50% 50–60% 60–70%
Governor before election
Roberto Sánchez Vilella
People's
Elected Governor
Luis A. Ferré
New Progressive
- Resident Commissioner election
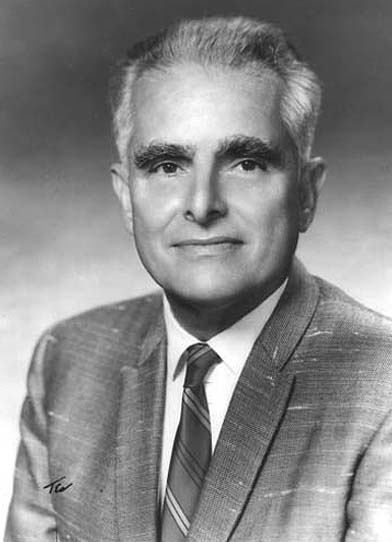

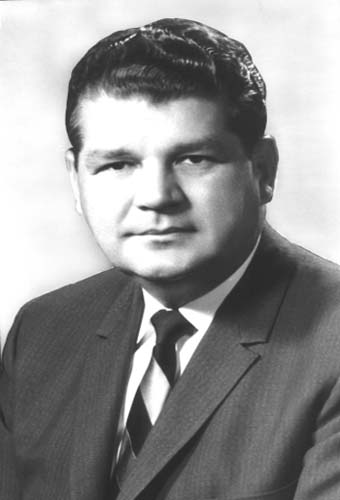

Nominee	Jorge Luis Córdova	Santiago Polanco-Abreu	Alfredo Nazario Tirado
Party	New Progressive	Popular Democratic	People's
Popular vote	400,544	384,998	94,519
Percentage	43.81%	42.11%	10.34%
- Results by municipality Córdova: 30–40% 40–50% 50–60% Polanco-Abreu: 40–50% 50–60% 60–70%

General elections were held in Puerto Rico on November 5, 1968. Luis A. Ferré of the New Progressive Party (PNP) was elected Governor. In the House of Representatives elections the PNP won a plurality of the vote, but the Popular Democratic Party won a majority of the seats. They also won a majority of seats in the Senate. Voter turnout was 78%.

== Results ==
=== Governor ===
Candidate	Party	Votes	%
Luis A. Ferré	New Progressive Party	400,815	43.62
Luis Negrón López	Popular Democratic Party	374,040	40.71
Roberto Sánchez Vilella	People's Party	107,359	11.68
Antonio J. González	Puerto Rican Independence Party	32,166	3.50
Ramiro L. Colón	Partido Estadista Republicano	4,449	0.48
Total		918,829	100.00
Valid votes		918,829	99.57
Invalid/blank votes		3,993	0.43
Total votes		922,822	100.00
Registered voters/turnout		1,176,895	78.41
Source: Nohlen, Puerto Rico Election Archive

=== Resident Commissioner ===
Candidate	Party	Votes	%
Jorge Luis Córdova	New Progressive Party	400,544	43.81
Santiago Polanco-Abreu	Popular Democratic Party	384,998	42.11
Alfredo Nazario Tirado	People's Party	94,519	10.34
Juan Antonio Agostini	Puerto Rican Independence Party	29,491	3.23
Nicolás Nogueras, Jr.	Partido Estadista Republicano	4,646	0.51
Total		914,198	100.00
Source: House of Representatives

=== House of Representatives ===
Party	Seats
Popular Democratic Party	26
New Progressive Party	25
People's Party	0
Puerto Rican Independence Party	0
Partido Estadista Republicano	0
Total	51
Source: Nohlen

=== Senate ===
Party	Seats
Popular Democratic Party	15
New Progressive Party	12
Puerto Rican Independence Party	0
Total	27
Source: Nohlen
