= 7th Support Command =

United States Army unit, 1978–1990

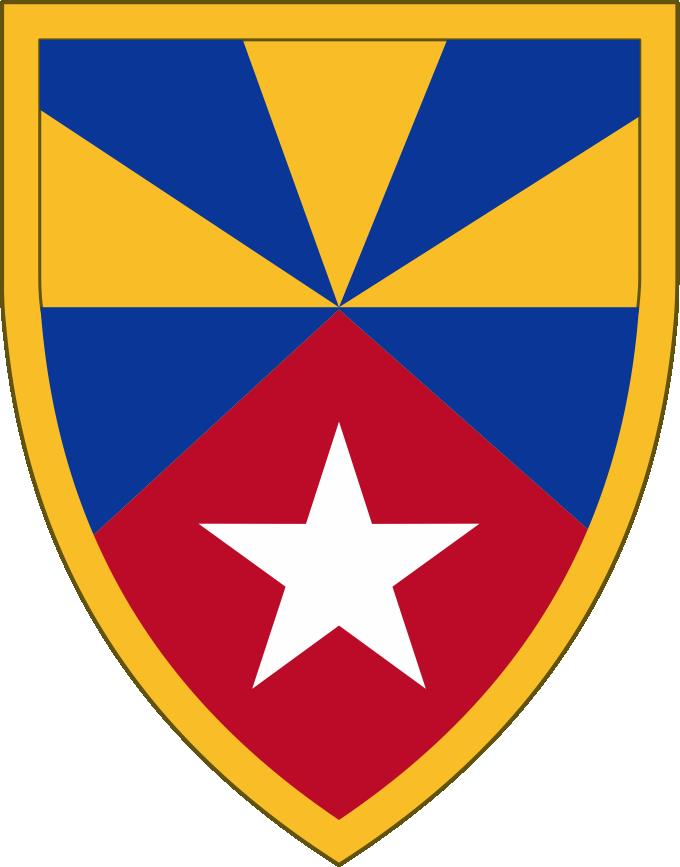
- Active: October 21, 1978 - October 1, 1990
- Country: United States
- Branch: Army
- Garrison/HQ: Kaiserslautern, Germany
- Motto: Vanguard For Support

Insignia
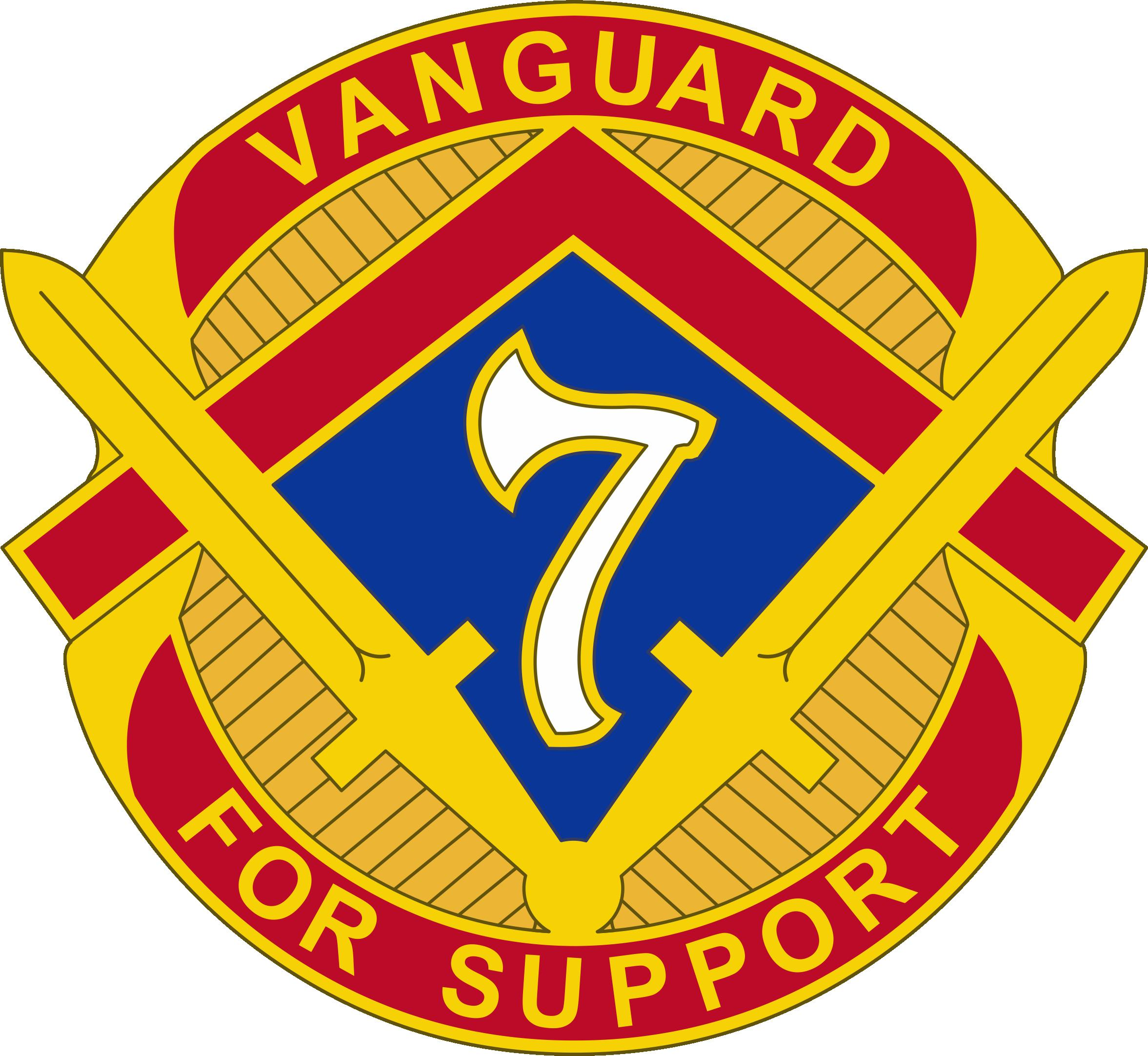
- Identification symbol

On October 21, 1978, Col. Mark L. Reese Jr., became the first commander of the 7th Support Command (Worms, West Germany) replacing the Seventh Army Support Command (formerly 7th Logistics Command) in Kaiserslautern, Germany. On November 1, 1988 the command was redesignated the 7th Field Army Support Command (FASCOM) which was further inactivated on October 1, 1990.

== Seventh Army Support Command ==
Commanders

- BG Stephen M. Mellnik (January 1958 – September 1958)
- BG George S. Speidel (September 1958 – November 1958)
- MG Thomas L. Sherburne, Jr. (November 1958 – December 1960)
- MG Andrew J. Adams (December 1960 – November 1962)
- MG William A. Harris (November 1962 – February 1964)

Major Subordinate Units (1960s)

- 1st Support Brigade
- 2nd Support Brigade
- 3rd Support Brigade
- 7th Medical Brigade
- 15th Military Police Brigade
- 57th Ordinance Brigade
- 107th Transportation Brigade

== Creation ==
The creation of the 7th Support Command (SUPCOM) was a part of Project Forward - a proposal from SACEUR to have troops, equipment and supplies deployed forward in Europe. The unit did not survive the drawdown of US forces in Europe at the end of the Cold War.

== Insignia ==
Shoulder Sleeve Insignia is a shield with a yellow border divided on top by seven alternating blue and gold triangular rays. The bottom is a brick red area with a white star. It was originally approved for the Seventh Army Support Command on 7 October 1966.

Distinctive Unit Insignia is a metal and enamel pin with a white axe in the shape of the number 7 inside a blue diamond. A "V" is formed outside the diamond by two gold swords. A brick red chevron tops the diamond and a scroll contains the motto "Vanguard For Support."
