= People's Party (Puerto Rico) =

Former political party in Puerto Rico

People's Party Partido del Pueblo
- Abbreviation: PP
- Founded: 1968
- Dissolved: 1972; 54 years ago
- Split from: People's Democratic Party
- Preceded by: Liberal Party of Puerto Rico
- Merged into: Puerto Rican Independence Party
- Succeeded by: Puerto Ricans for Puerto Rico
- Headquarters: San Juan, Puerto Rico
- Ideology: Social liberalism
- Political position: Centre-left

People's Party Logo

The People's Party (PP) (Spanish: Partido del Pueblo, PP) was a political party in Puerto Rico, founded by Roberto Sánchez Vilella in 1968. It was also known as el Partido del Sol (the Party of the Sun) from its logo which featured a bright orange rising sun.

== History ==
In 1964, Partido Popular Democratico (PPD) candidate Roberto Sánchez Vilella had become the second governor to be democratically elected in Puerto Rico. The party remained in power until 1968, when Luis A. Ferré, of the newly founded Partido Nuevo Progresista (PNP), won the elections due to the PPD's big division of 1968. This division was the result of the personal and irreconcilable differences between the PPD's founder, Luis Muñoz Marín, and then current governor, Roberto Sánchez Vilella.

Luis Muñoz Marín had opposed Sánchez Vilella's attempt to run for reelection and at a party assembly party-founder Muñoz Marín nominated Luis Negrón López as his new candidate for governor. The nomination caused a deep division in the PPD prompting Sánchez Vilella to create a new party, the Partido del Pueblo (People's Party). The new party's motto was "que el pueblo decida" ("let the people decide"), a motto clearly directed at Muñoz Marín who denied Sánchez Vilella of a primary.

Sánchez Vilella ran as candidate for governor under this new party and Negrón López ran under the PPD banner. The result was a split among PPD's voters, leading to the first victory by Luis A. Ferré of the PNP (Partido Nuevo Progresista) and the PPD's defeat in the 1968 general election.

== See also ==
- List of political parties in Puerto Rico
- Politics of Puerto Rico
