= 100 Biscayne =

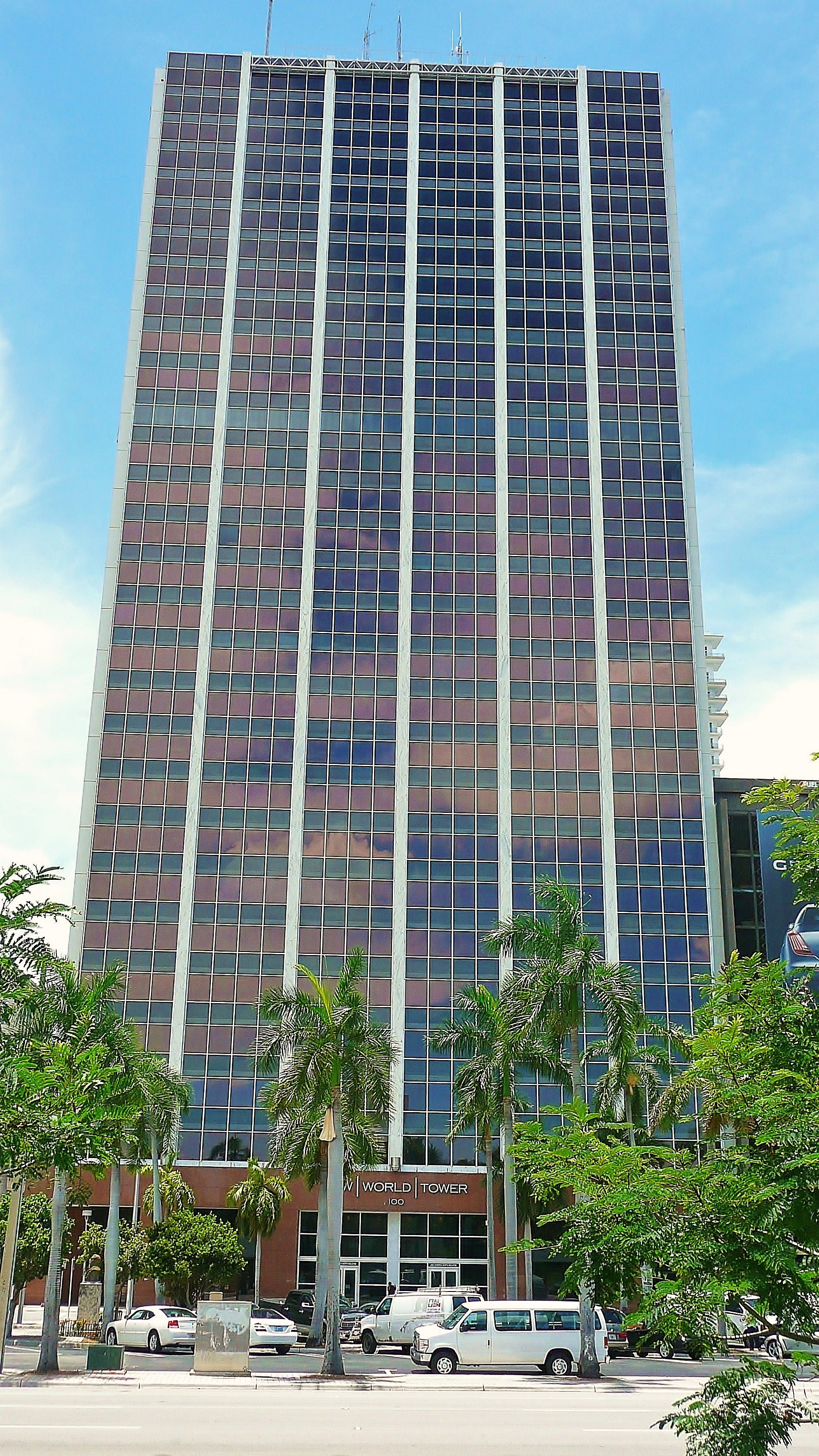
- 100 Biscayne as seen from Bayfront Park
- Interactive map of the 100 Biscayne area
- Alternative names: New World Tower, 100 Biscayne Tower, Ferre Building

General information
- Type: Office, data center, and retail (street level)
- Location: 100 North Biscayne Boulevard, Downtown Miami, Florida; United States
- Coordinates: 25.775722°N 80.188174°W
- Construction started: October 1963
- Completed: 1965
- Opening: 1965
- Owner: 100 NWT, L. L. C.

Height
- Roof: 357 ft (108.8 m)

Technical details
- Floor count: 30
- Floor area: 271,514 square feet (25,224.5 m^{2})
- Lifts/elevators: 7

Design and construction
- Architects: Rader and Associates, Engineers and Architects
- Developer: Ferré Florida Corp.
- Main contractor: Frank J. Rooney, Inc.

Website
- 100biscayneblvd.com

100 Biscayne, formerly known as New World Tower and 100 Biscayne Tower, is a thirty-story skyscraper in the Central Business District of Greater Downtown Miami, Florida, United States. 100 Biscayne also owns an adjacent 12-story mechanical parking garage that provides parking for its office tenants and its guests but also offers valet parking services for several nearby hotels and restaurants.

The tower is 357 feet (109 m) tall and contains commercial space at street level. Floors two to four of the building house a data center, miami-connect, and the remaining 25 floors contain office space. Formerly, the upper nine floors contained luxury apartments.

When completed in 1965, the building was acclaimed by its architect as "a very modern but conservative design which will wear exceptionally well throughout the years." It was developed by Jose Ferré, the father of former city mayor, Maurice Ferré. It is owned and managed by affiliates of East End Capital Partners, LLC.

== See also ==
- List of tallest buildings in Miami
