= Raúl G. Villaronga =

First Puerto Rican mayor of city in Texas, US

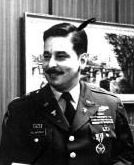
- Raúl G. Villaronga

Mayor of Killeen, Texas
- In office 1992–1998

Personal details
- Born: April 1, 1938 Ponce, Puerto Rico
- Died: March 20, 2021 (aged 82) Killeen, Texas
- Education: Texas A&M College, B.S. (1959), Industrial Engineering; Texas Tech University, M.S (1973), Industrial Engineering
- Occupation: consultant
- Known for: Mayor of Killeen, Texas (1992–1998)
- Military career
- Allegiance: United States of America
- Branch: United States Army
- Service years: 1959–1985
- Rank: Colonel
- Commands: Co B, 1st Battalion, 8th Cavalry Regiment (Airborne); 13th Corps Support Command (COSCOM)
- Conflicts: Vietnam War
- Awards: Silver Star; Legion of Merit; Bronze Star w/ "V" Device (4)

Raúl G. Villaronga (April 1, 1938 – March 20, 2021) was a United States Army officer who was the first Puerto Rican mayor of a Texas city. He served as mayor of Killeen, Texas, for three consecutive terms, from 1992 to 1998.

== Early years ==
Raúl G. Villaronga was born on April 1, 1938, in Ponce, Puerto Rico, His parents were Raul Gil Villaronga Pasarell, an accountant with the Puerto Rico Iron Works who once served in the United States Army, and Maria Monserrate Martinez Perez, a school teacher and a housewife. Raúl was the second of their three children. His family moved to St Croix, Virgin Islands, where his father worked as an accountant for a distillery. In Christiansted, he began his elementary school education. After a few years, his family returned to Puerto Rico, and he was enrolled in the public school system of Ponce. During his early teen years, he attended the Catholic Seminary (Casa Manresa) in the town of Aibonito, Puerto Rico, for two years and studied ancient Greek and Latin. Villaronga returned to school at the Colegio Ponceño de Varones in Ponce, and in his senior year, transferred to Ponce High School (the "original" Ponce High School), from which he graduated in 1954.

During his high school years, he joined the Civil Air Patrol and was a member of the national champion Ponce Drill Team. This experience served as an influential factor in his decision as to which college/university he would attend. He enrolled in Texas A&M University because of its military environment, and immediately enrolled in the institution's Air Force ROTC (Reserve Officers' Training Corps) program. In 1954, Villaronga met his future wife, Julia Bush. After his freshman year he returned to Puerto Rico for one year, after which he returned once more to Texas A&M University and this time joined the Army ROTC program. Villaronga married Julia in 1958 during his senior year. In 1959, he earned his Bachelor of Science in industrial engineering and was commissioned as an infantry second lieutenant of the U.S. Army.

== Military career ==
While attending Texas A&M, Villaronga worked for Brown & Root Caribe in Puerto Rico and for Brown & Root, Inc. in Texas during the period of time between his graduation from college and the time that he had to report for his active military duty. He was ordered to report to Fort Benning, U.S. state of Georgia, on April 3, 1960, for his basic training. Upon the completion of his basic training, he attended the Infantry Officer's Basic Course and Basic Airborne Course. In December 1960, he was assigned as platoon leader in the 1st Battle Group, 87th Infantry and then 2nd BG, 23rd Infantry at Fort Benning. On October 3, 1961, Villaronga was promoted to first lieutenant and underwent intense combat training during the Berlin Crisis. In 1962, he took the Special Forces Officer's Course and served from March 1962 to November 1962 as Special Forces officer at the 7th Special Forces Group (Airborne), Fort Bragg, North Carolina. He underwent extensive mountain training in West Virginia and jungle operations training at Eglin Air Force Base (Air Commandos).

From 1963 to 1965, Villaronga was assigned to the 8th Special Forces Group (Airborne) at Fort Gulick in the Panama Canal Zone, where he served in several classified counterinsurgency missions which included an assignment in 1965 of commander of Detachment XX, 8th Special Forces Group, in Central and South America, in which he conducted training for American and Latin American soldiers in basic, jumpmaster, rigger, and pathfinder courses. During his stay in the Canal Zone, Villaronga continued his military preparation by studying Portuguese at the Defense Language Institute and jungle warfare operations. Villaronga was promoted to captain on October 26, 1964.

=== Vietnam War ===
In 1966, Villaronga completed the Infantry Officers Career Course and then was sent to the Republic of Vietnam, where he served two tours during the Vietnam War. From July to September 1966, he served as the adjutant of the 1st Battalion, 8th Cavalry Regiment (Airborne). From October 1966 through July 1967, he served as company commander, Co B, 1st Battalion, 8th Cavalry Regiment (Airborne).

When he returned to the United States, Villaronga served as special warfare instructor, U.S. Army Quartermaster School and as supply systems instructor, US Army Quartermaster School from September 1967 to December 1969 at Fort Lee, in Virginia. During this period of time he was promoted to major (October 26, 1967) and completed the Supply Management Course and ADP Systems Analysis Course.

During the 1970s, he completed the Logistics Executive Development Course and served in various positions in the military. He returned to the Republic of Vietnam and served as logistics staff officer, 29th General Support Group, and as the battalion executive officer, 266 Supply and Service Battalion.

=== Post-Vietnam War ===
In June 1973, he was reassigned to Mechanicsburg, Pennsylvania, where until November 1976 he served in the following positions: chief, plans & programs, and manpower, defense depot; chief, management support office, defense depot and chief, transportation division, defense depot. During this period (1973) Villaronga earned his master's degree in industrial engineering from Texas Tech University and also completed the following courses: Defense Language Institute (German) and the Brigade, Battalion Commanders Course. On January 1, 1976, he was promoted to lieutenant colonel. From November 1976 to October 1979, he served in Europe as commander, 66th Maintenance Battalion in Kaiserslautern, Germany, and later as plans & operation officer, 7th Support Command.

In November 1979, Villaronga was assigned to New Cumberland, Pennsylvania, where he served as logistics staff officer, U.S. Army Logistics Evaluation Agency. In 1980, he attended the Command & General Staff College, and on November 1, 1981, he was promoted to colonel. In June 1983, Villaronga was sent to Fort Hood, Texas, where he served as deputy commander, 13th Support Command and later as director of instrumentation, US Army TCATA, until August 1985. On August 1, 1985, Villaronga retired from the United States Army.

=== Awards and decorations ===
Among Villaronga's military decorations are the following:

Badge	Combat Infantryman Badge		
1st Row	Silver Star		Legion of Merit
2nd Row	Bronze Star Medal w/ "V" Device and 3 Oak Leaf Clusters	Meritorious Service Medal w/ 2 Bronze Oak Leaf Clusters	Air Medal
3rd Row	Army Commendation Medal	Joint Service Commendation Medal	Joint Service Achievement Medal
4th Row	Vietnam Service Medal w/ 4 bronze Service stars	Army Service Ribbon	Army Overseas Service Ribbon w/ award numeral 1
5th Row	National Defense Service Medal	Vietnam Cross of Gallantry w/ Silver Service Star	Vietnam Campaign Medal
6th Row	Army Meritorious Unit Commendation		

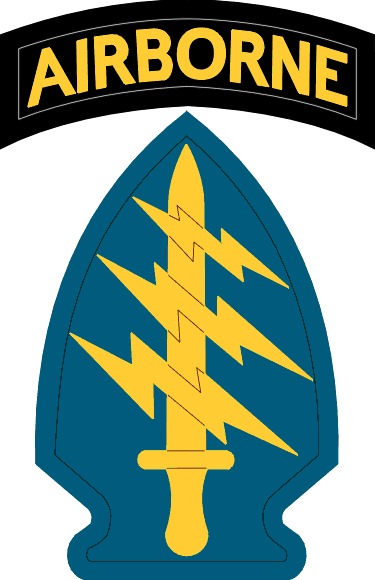

Badge	Special Forces Tab
Badge	Master Parachutist Badge
Badge	U.S. Army 8th Special Forces Group (United States) Shoulder sleeve insignia
Badge	1st Special Forces Command (Airborne) Distinctive Unit Insignia

== Civilian life ==
After Villaronga retired from the United States Army in 1985, he decided to make Killeen his home and went to work as a part-time professor at Central Texas College, where he taught logistics, math and computer science. Unable to get a full-time position as a professor because he lacked a master's degree in education, he decided to work as a consultant for the Department of Defense and later for Brown & Root Services Corporation in Houston. Villaronga applied and was hired by the Texas Attorney General's Office in Austin, and served with the Child Support Enforcement Division. He designed and implemented a case tracking system that provided visibility as to what was happening to cases in each of the organizations involved with CSED.

== Political career ==
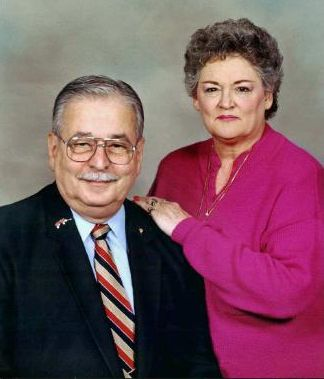
Raul and Julia Villaronga

Villaronga became interested in an ongoing situation between the citizens of Killeen and the members of the Killeen City Council which involved the building of a convention center and as a result ran for city council member in 1989. He served a 2-year term as city council member until 1991.

In 1992, Villaronga successfully ran for mayor of Killeen. Villaronga, the first Puerto Rican to be elected mayor of a Texas city was sworn in office June 20, 1992. He eventually resigned from the OAG after serving his first term as mayor. As mayor, he served as the head of the City of Killeen government for all ceremonial purposes, and for the purposes of military law. Along with the council members, he was responsible for soliciting citizen views in forming these policies and interpreting them for the public. Villaronga successfully served for three consecutive terms and in 1998 stepped down as mayor in accordance with the term limits established by the city charter. During the years in which Villaronga served as mayor, he was involved with and responsible for the implementation of the following:

- An agreement with the Cable Company for a Government-access television cable TV channel, where the City Council Meetings are broadcast live.
- Establishment of the Central Texas Area Veterans Advisory Committee, giving veterans a stronger voice on local matters which resulted in the recognition of the contributions of all veterans to the community.
- A plan for Automation that integrated Local Area Networks in the city's Departments was established.
- An agreement with the Army to use Fort Hood's Robert Gray Army Airfield as a Joint Use Airport, which opened up transportation to the area and resulted in a great economic growth boom.
- A Youth Advisory Commission which provided representation to their Future Leaders as a Commission reporting directly to the City Council on all matters concerning Youth.
- Establishment of the first Sister City Program in Killeen with the city of Osan, South Korea.

== Later years ==
Among the civic organizations which Villaronga was involved with were the Disabled American Veterans, Veterans of Foreign Wars, and the American Legion. He was also a member of the League of United Latin American Citizens (LULAC) and the National Association for the Advancement of Colored People (NAACP). Villaronga and his wife were on the board of directors of Killeen Crime Stoppers, Inc., and they were both members of the Greater Killeen Chamber of Commerce. They both served as Chamber Ambassadors, who are the "visible" face of the chamber in promoting business and growth. Villaronga won the 2003 Exchange Club of Killeen Golden Deeds Award. On December 3, 2007, Villaronga, chairman of LULAC's Killeen Foundation, helped organize an event that honored both the "Borinqueneers" (the 65th Infantry Regiment of the United States Army, composed almost entirely of Puerto Ricans who fought in the Korean War) and Puerto Rico Senate President Kenneth McClintock.

Villaronga and his wife were retired and resided in Killeen. They had three grown sons. Villaronga died March 20, 2021, in Killeen. He was buried with full Military Honors at the Central Texas State Veterans Cemetery in Killeen, Texas.

== See also ==
- List of Puerto Ricans
- List of Puerto Rican military personnel
