= Puerto Rico Iron Works =

Heavy industry iron foundry in Ponce, Puerto Rico

Coordinates: 17°58′55.92″N 66°37′12.29″W

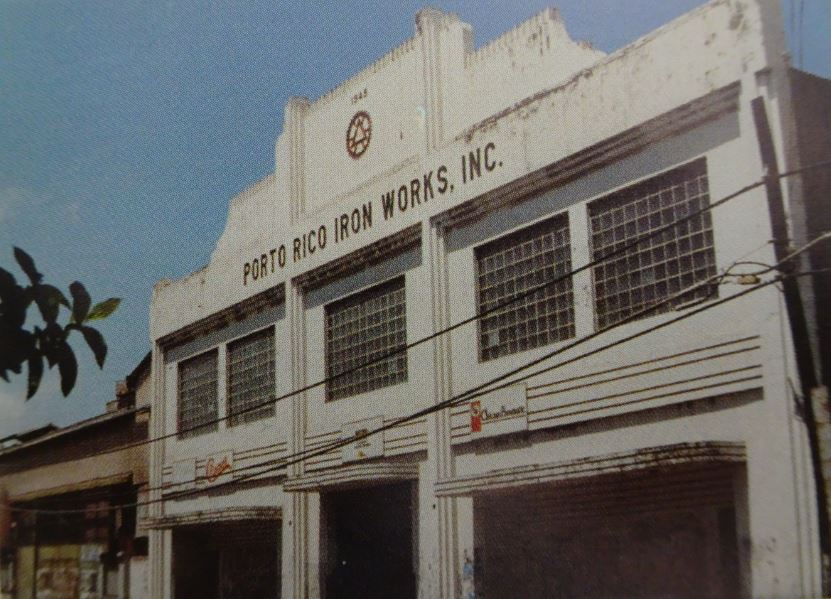
- Type: Private
- Industry: Iron foundry
- Founded: Ponce, Puerto Rico (1918)
- Headquarters: Ponce, Puerto Rico
- Key people: Antonio Ferré Bacallao, José A. Ferré, Luis A. Ferré, Carlos F. Ferré, Hermann Ferré
- Products: Manhole covers Rail tracks Water meter covers

Puerto Rico Iron Works (founded as Porto Rico Iron Works) was a heavy industry iron foundry located in barrio La Playa in Ponce, Puerto Rico. The company was founded in 1918. The foundry "was Puerto Rico's most prolific steel bridge fabricator in the 20th Century" and the largest iron foundry in the Antilles. At its peak, it employed over 700 people. It closed in 1982.

== History ==
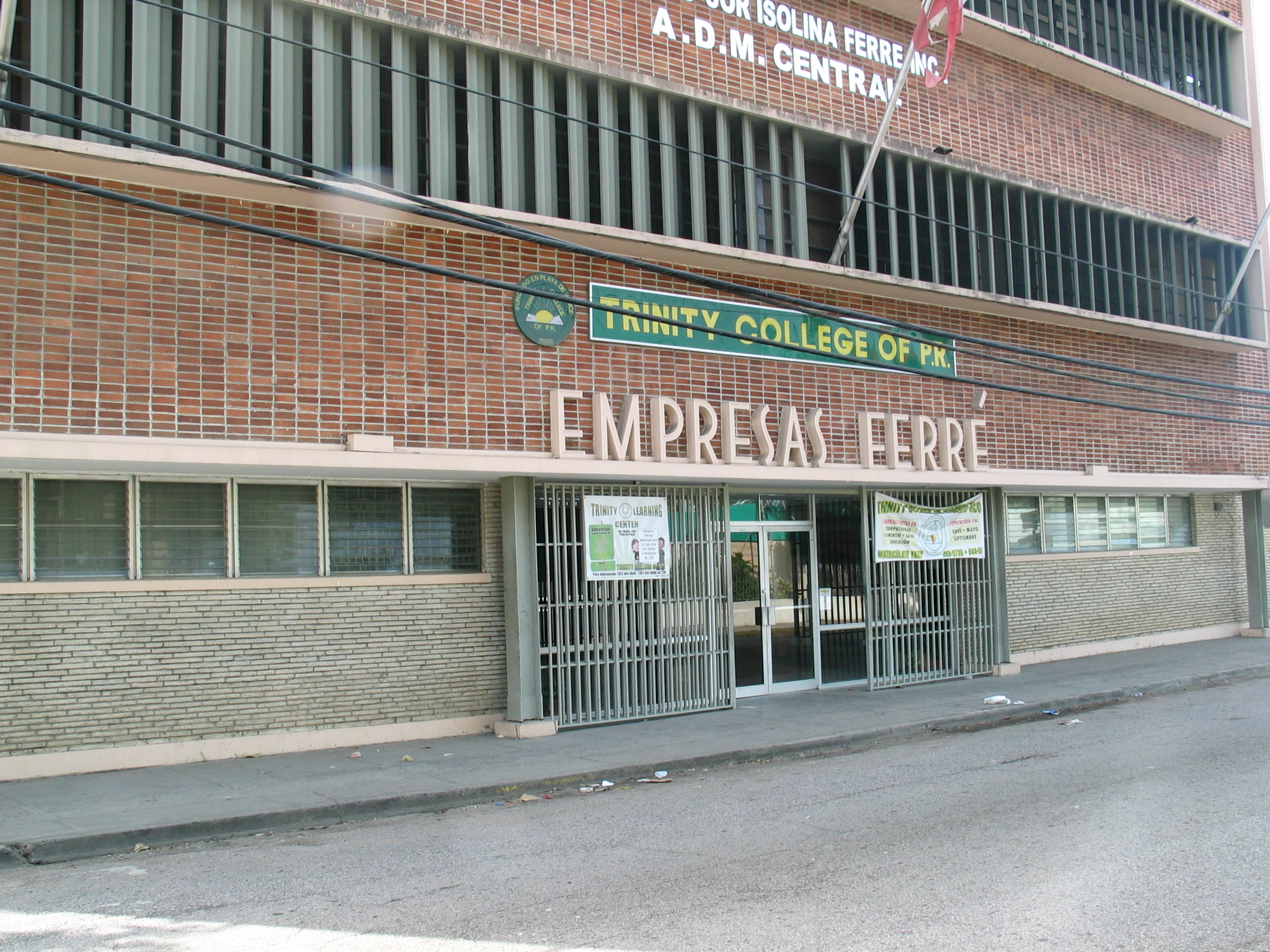
The administrative offices of Puerto Rico Iron Works in Barrio Playa in Ponce, Puerto Rico.

Puerto Rico Iron Works (PRIW) was founded by Antonio Ferré Bacallao, an 1896 immigrant from Cuba, whose father was a French engineer that had worked in the construction of the Panama Canal. Antonio Ferré's family would become one of the most legendary families in Puerto Rico: one of his sons, Luis A. Ferré, became governor of the island from 1969 to 1973, and one of his daughters, Isolina Ferré, known as The Mother Teresa of Puerto Rico, received the Presidential Medal of Freedom from President Bill Clinton in 1999 for her outstanding role in community activities, including the founding of a small hospital and school in Playa de Ponce next to the iron foundry called Centro de Orientacion y Servicios.

Antonio Ferré founded Puerto Rico Iron Works after experience he had garnished from his short employment experience at Puerto Rico's first iron foundry, Sobrinos de Portilla Foundry, in San Juan. After learning that his uncle Luis Bacallao had settled in Ponce, Antonio Ferré moved to Ponce where his family would establish roots. His son's José, Luis, Carlos and Hermann helped transform Puerto Rico Iron Works into a highly successful business after all being educated in the United States and returning to Puerto Rico. José graduated with a business administration degree from Boston University while Luis, Carlos and Hermann all completed engineering degrees from Massachusetts Institute of Technology. The Ferré brothers recruited some very bright talent for the company, including Raúl G. Villaronga, the company's accountant who would later become the first Puerto Rican mayor of a Texas city.

== Foundry works ==
The company first started doing business for Puerto Rican sugar and coffee plantations, in the area of irrigation systems and railroad track and wagon systems to carry products between plantations in the south. It also developed machinery for the crushing of sugar cane at sugar cane mills. Almost all of the railroad tracks laid in Puerto Rico in the early decades of the 20th century originated from PRIW. In the first half of the 20th century, the company was heavily involved in the production of iron-based bridges to address Puerto Rico's need for bridges. The foundry was located just a few blocks away from the Port of Ponce docks, making the company one within easy reach for vessels requiring repairs as well. In the second half of the century the company was into the manufacturing of a number of specialty items such as manhole covers. In 1939, it restored the ceiling of Plaza del Mercado de Ponce.

== Social inclination ==
Puerto Rico Iron Works, under José A. Ferré's leadership with brothers Luis, Carlos and Hermann, was the first company doing business in Puerto Rico to implement several labor measures that would not be adopted by the Puerto Rico Legislature until decades later, among them the institution of a Christmas bonus for employees to supplement the cost-of-living increases during financially difficult times, and the incorporation of a pension fund. The company was also the first to provide aid to families in case of a worker’s incapacity or death. The company also implemented a minimum wage "law" of its own and an 8-hour labor day "before US law enforced those ideas".

== See also ==
- Luis A. Ferré
- Ponce, Puerto Rico
