= José Ferré =

Puerto Rican businessman (1902–1990)

- Born: José Antonio Ferré Aguayo; September 12, 1902; Ponce, Puerto Rico
- Died: September 15, 1990 (aged 88); Puerto Rico
- Occupation: Businessman
- Parent(s): Antonio Ferré and Mary Aguayo

José Antonio Ferré Aguayo (September 12, 1902 – September 15, 1990) was a Puerto Rican businessman, industrialist and government official. He was a brother of Luis Ferré, who served as Governor of Puerto Rico, and Isolina Ferré, the "Mother Teresa of Puerto Rico". Ferré was also the father of Maurice Ferré, a former six-term mayor of Miami, Florida.

== Early life and education ==
Ferré was born in Ponce and the son of Cuban born Antonio Ferré Bacallao. After attending Morristown-School (now Morristown-Beard School) in Morristown, New Jersey, he earned his bachelor's degree in business administration at Boston University in Boston, Massachusetts, in 1924. Ferré later served on the board of trustees of the school alongside Edward Kennedy. He earned his master's degree in business administration from the Miami Herbert Business School at the University of Miami.

== Career ==
During the years following World War II, Ferré grew his wealth by purchasing bankrupt glass, cement, and carton factories. At one point, his family empire owned 80 corporations in Puerto Rico, the United States, Venezuela, and Panama.

In 1965, Ferré's real estate company, the Ferré Florida Corporation, financed the construction of the 30-story New World Tower in the Central Business District in Miami. At the time, the building, which cost $6 million to construct, stood as the tallest in Florida. Its construction represented part of a broader effort to revitalize Miami.

== Death ==
José Ferré died on September 15, 1990 at 88 years of age. He was buried at Cementerio Católico San Vicente de Paul in Ponce.

== Legacy ==
In 1990, U.S. Representative Ileana Ros-Lehtinen from Florida's 27th congressional district honored the legacy and impact of Ferré during remarks on the floor of the U.S. House of Representatives. The tribute recognized Ferré's vision and industrial pursuits.
