= Antonio Luis Ferré =

Puerto Rican businessman (1934–2024)

- Born: February 6, 1934; Ponce, Puerto Rico
- Died: June 16, 2024 (aged 90); San Juan, Puerto Rico
- Occupation: Industrialist

Antonio Luis Alfredo Ferre Ramírez de Arellano (February 6, 1934 – June 16, 2024) was a Puerto Rican businessman. He was Chairman of the Board of the Ferré-Rangel business emporium which owns Puerto Rico's largest newspaper, El Nuevo Día, as well as Primera Hora newspaper.

Ferré was the son of former Governor of Puerto Rico, Don Luis A. Ferré, and Lorenza Ramírez de Arellano. His sister was writer and essayist Rosario Ferré.

Ferré served as member of the Puerto Rico Civil Rights Commission in the 1960s, and managed his father's political campaigns. From 1965 to 1966 he was president of the Puerto Rico Manufacturers Association.

Following semi-retirement, Ferré and his wife, Luisa Rangel, delegated to their sons and daughters the day-to-day operations of his businesses and non-profit entities, including the Ponce Museum of Art and the Ferré Foundation created by his father.

Antonio Luis Ferré died in San Juan, Puerto Rico on June 16, 2024, at the age of 90.
