= 2nd Support Command =

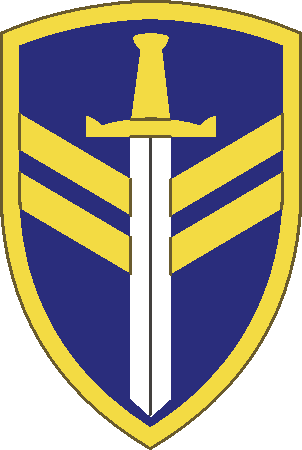
- 2nd Support Command (Corps) 2nd Support Brigade Unit SSI approved 15 February 1966
- Active: 1965 - 1993
- Country: United States
- Branch: Army
- Motto: Excel All

Insignia
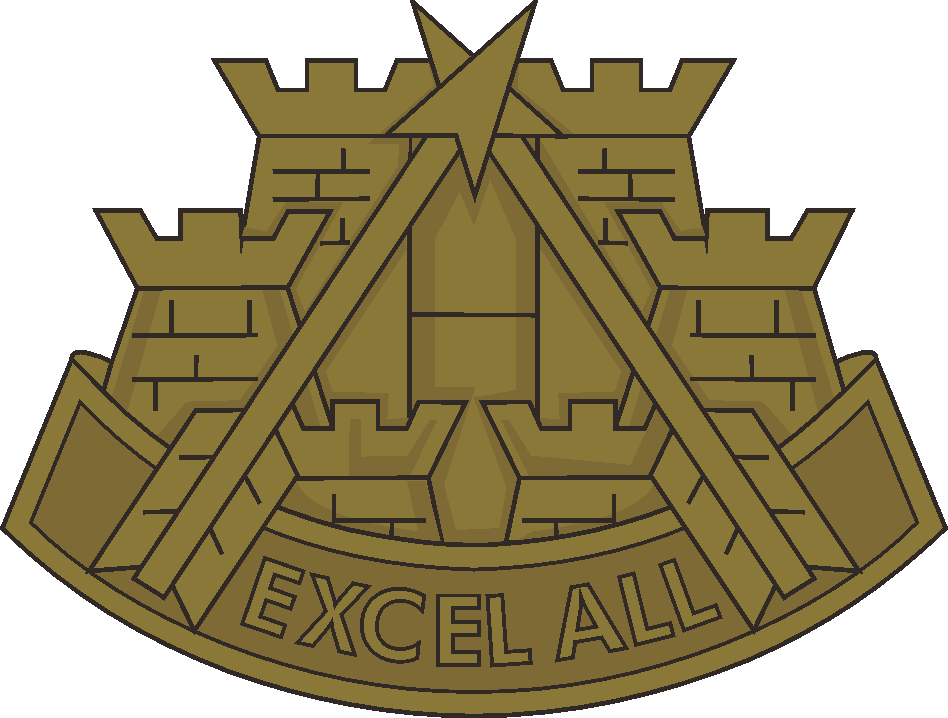
- Identification symbol: 2nd Support Command DUI

The 2nd Support Brigade was activated on 24 June 1965 and assigned to the Seventh Army Support Command in Germany. The brigade was deactivated In 1969 but was later replaced by replaced by 2nd Support Command (Corps) or 2nd COSCOM in January 1973.

On 11 October 1988 the 2nd Support Command (Corps) was part of a reorganization to provide maintenance, logistical, ammunition, transportation and medical support within the VII Corps area which covered the southern area of the Federal Republic of Germany.

During the Gulf War, the 2nd Support Command was among the units deployed to Kuwait. As a result of the incredibly large logistical challenge facing U.S. and Coalition forces, the size of 2nd Support Command grew from its peacetime roster of under 8,000 to more than 25,000. The command was deactivated in 1992 along with the VII Corps.

== Insignia ==
Shoulder Sleeve Insignia is a blue shield measuring 2 inches by 3 inches, with a 1/8 inch yellow border. It displays a white sword pointing downward, with a yellow hilt in front of two yellow inverted chevrons. The shoulder sleeve insignia was originally approved for the 2d Support Brigade on 15 February 1966.

Distinctive Unit Insignia is a bronze device measuring 15/16 inch in height features a castle with six towers, with a scroll and the motto "EXCEL ALL." Two arrows, cross at their heads to form a star. The distinctive unit insignia was originally approved for the 2d Support Brigade on 6 June 1966.
