= Manuel A. García Méndez =

Puerto Rican politician

Member of the Puerto Rico Senate from the Aguadilla district
- In office 1929–1932

Personal details
- Born: Manuel Américo García Méndez; August 12, 1898 Añasco, Puerto Rico
- Died: February 6, 2001 (aged 102)
- Party: Alianza Puertorriqueña; Liberal Party of Puerto Rico
- Education: University of Puerto Rico School of Law (JD)
- Occupation: Politician, Senator, Lawyer

Manuel A. García Méndez was born in Añasco, Puerto Rico. He was a recognized businessman, lawyer, and politician.

== Family ==
He came from a numerous family, in which several siblings were recognized politicians in Puerto Rico. Among them were Miguel A. García Méndez and Juan B. García Méndez.

== Politics ==
As Senator, he was responsible for introducing Law Number 74 of 1929, which gave women the right to vote.

He wanted statehood for Puerto Rico.
