= Partido Acción Cristiana =

Political party in Puerto Rico

Christian Action Party Partido Acción Cristiana
- Abbreviation: PAC
- Founded: 1959
- Dissolved: 1967; 58 years ago
- Headquarters: San Juan, Puerto Rico
- Ideology: Political Catholicism; Christian democracy; Conservatism
- Political position: Centre-right

The Partido Acción Cristiana (PAC) (English: Christian Action Party) was formed in the 1960s to challenge Luis Muñoz Marín and his Popular Democratic Party.

Some of its main leaders were the independentistas Jose Luis Feliu Pesquera and the brothers Juan Augusto Perea and Salvador Perea. Bishops James P. Davis of San Juan and James McManus of Ponce also favored the creation of the party. They told Catholics that voting for the PPD was counter to Christian morality. Nevertheless, their results were limited.

According to Puerto Rican Senator-at-Large Hipólito Marcano, who testified before the U.S. Senate Education Subcommittee, which was then debating federal funding for parochial schools, the party was "used as a political weapon of the church to launch a frontal attack, not only to capture the public schools of Puerto Rico, but also to capture the government of Puerto Rico. The pulpit was turned into a political forum, the people were coerced and threatened with excommunication if they did not follow the political advice of the hierarchy."

The party is now defunct.

Logo used by the PAC during the 1964 election

Original party logo

== See also ==
- Puerto Rican general election, 1960
- Puerto Rican general election, 1964
