= 1956 Puerto Rican general election =

- November 6, 1956
- Gubernatorial election
- Turnout: 80.37%
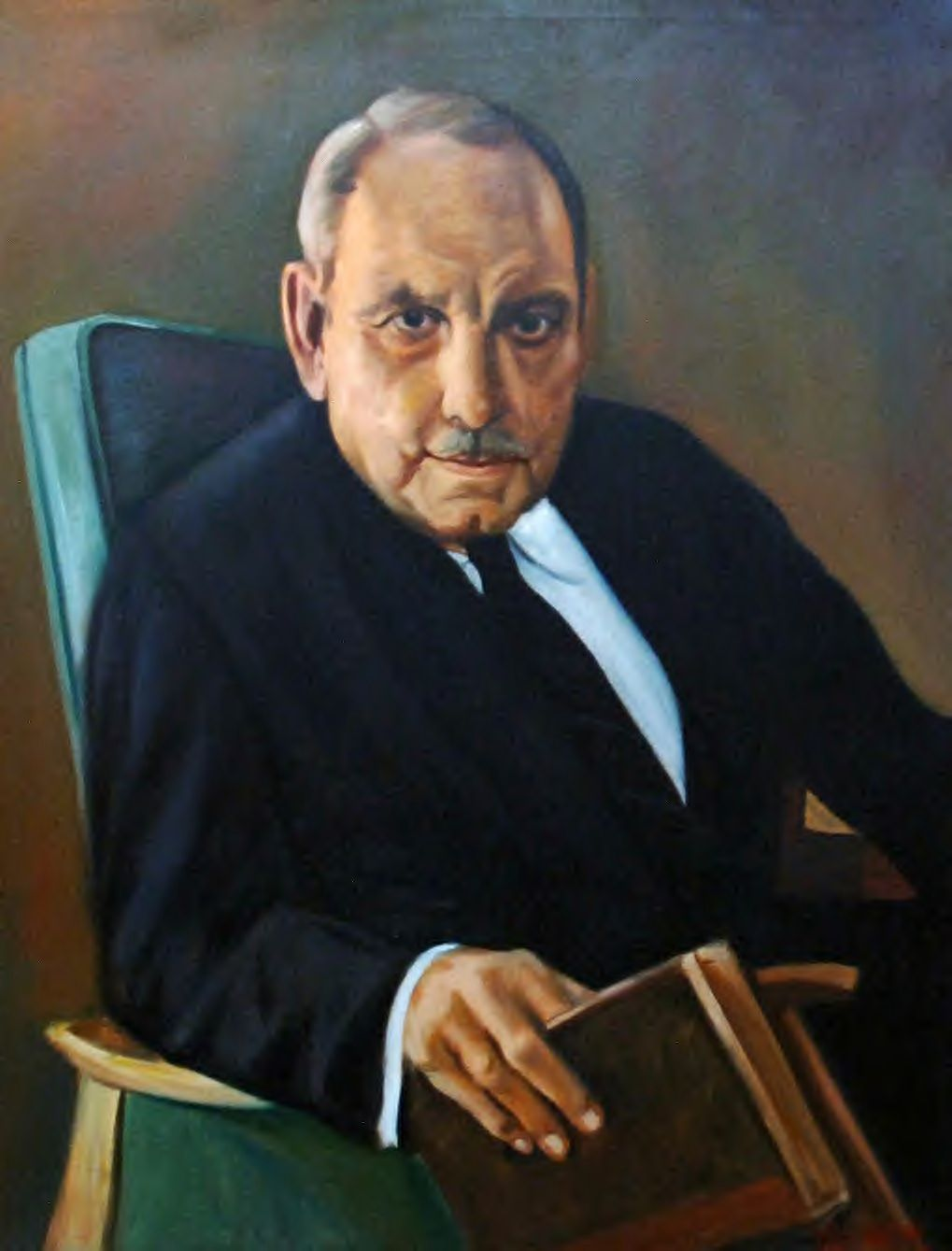

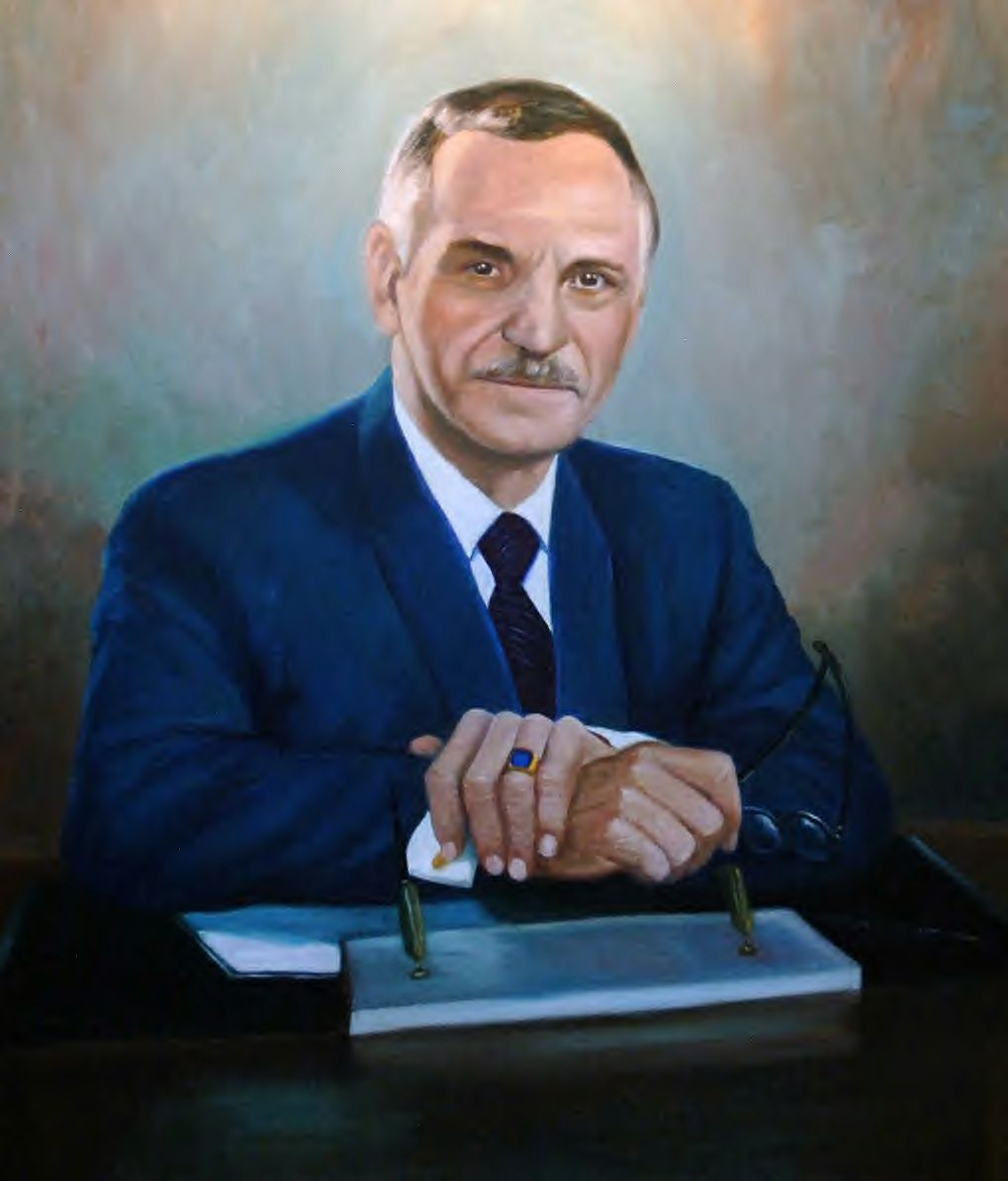

Nominee	Luis Muñoz Marín	Luis A. Ferré	Francisco Susoni
Party	Popular Democratic	PER	Independence
Popular vote	435,256	174,683	86,636
Percentage	62.51%	25.08%	12.44%
- Results by municipality Muñoz: 40–50% 50–60% 60–70% 70–80% 80–90%
Governor before election
Luis Muñoz Marín
Popular Democratic
Elected Governor
Luis Muñoz Marín
Popular Democratic
- Resident Commissioner election
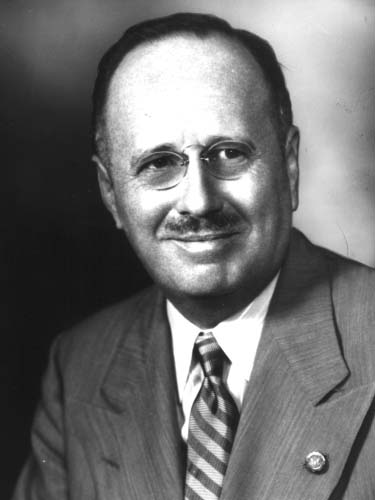

Nominee	Antonio Fernós-Isern	Antonio Ortíz Toro	Marco A. Ramírez
Party	Popular Democratic	PER	Independence
Popular vote	434,256	173,580	86,886
Percentage	62.51%	24.99%	12.51%

General elections were held in Puerto Rico on November 6, 1956. Luis Muñoz Marín of the Popular Democratic Party (PPD) was re-elected as governor, whilst the PPD also won a majority of seats in the legislative elections. Voter turnout was 80%.

== Results ==
=== Governor ===
Candidate	Party	Votes	%
Luis Muñoz Marín	Popular Democratic Party	435,255	62.49
Luis A. Ferré	Partido Estadista Republicano	174,683	25.08
Francisco Susoni	Puerto Rican Independence Party	86,636	12.44
Total		696,574	100.00
Valid votes		696,574	99.26
Invalid/blank votes		5,164	0.74
Total votes		701,738	100.00
Registered voters/turnout		873,085	80.37
Source: Nohlen

=== Resident Commissioner ===
Candidate	Party	Votes	%
Antonio Fernós-Isern	Popular Democratic Party	434,256	62.51
Antonio Ortíz Toro	Partido Estadista Republicano	173,580	24.99
Marco A. Ramírez	Puerto Rican Independence Party	86,886	12.51
Total		694,722	100.00
Source: Nolla

=== Senate ===
Party	District class I			District class II			At-large			Total seats
Party	Votes	%	Seats	Votes	%	Seats	Votes	%	Seats	Total seats
Popular Democratic Party	434,123	62.51	8	434,030	62.52	8	434,109	62.54	7	23
Partido Estadista Republicano	173,472	24.98	0	173,419	24.98	0	173,240	24.96	3	3
Puerto Rican Independence Party	86,839	12.51	0	86,751	12.50	0	86,789	12.50	3	3
Total	694,434	100.00	8	694,200	100.00	8	694,138	100.00	13	29
Source: Nolla

=== House of Representatives ===
Party	District			At-large			Total seats
Party	Votes	%	Seats	Votes	%	Seats	Total seats
Popular Democratic Party	432,397	62.43	40	434,463	63.46	7	47
Partido Estadista Republicano	172,639	24.93	0	173,275	25.31	3	3
Puerto Rican Independence Party	87,546	12.64	0	76,903	11.23	6	6
Total	692,582	100.00	40	684,641	100.00	16	56
Source: Nolla
