= 1960 Puerto Rican general election =

- November 8, 1960
- Gubernatorial election
- Turnout: 84.60%
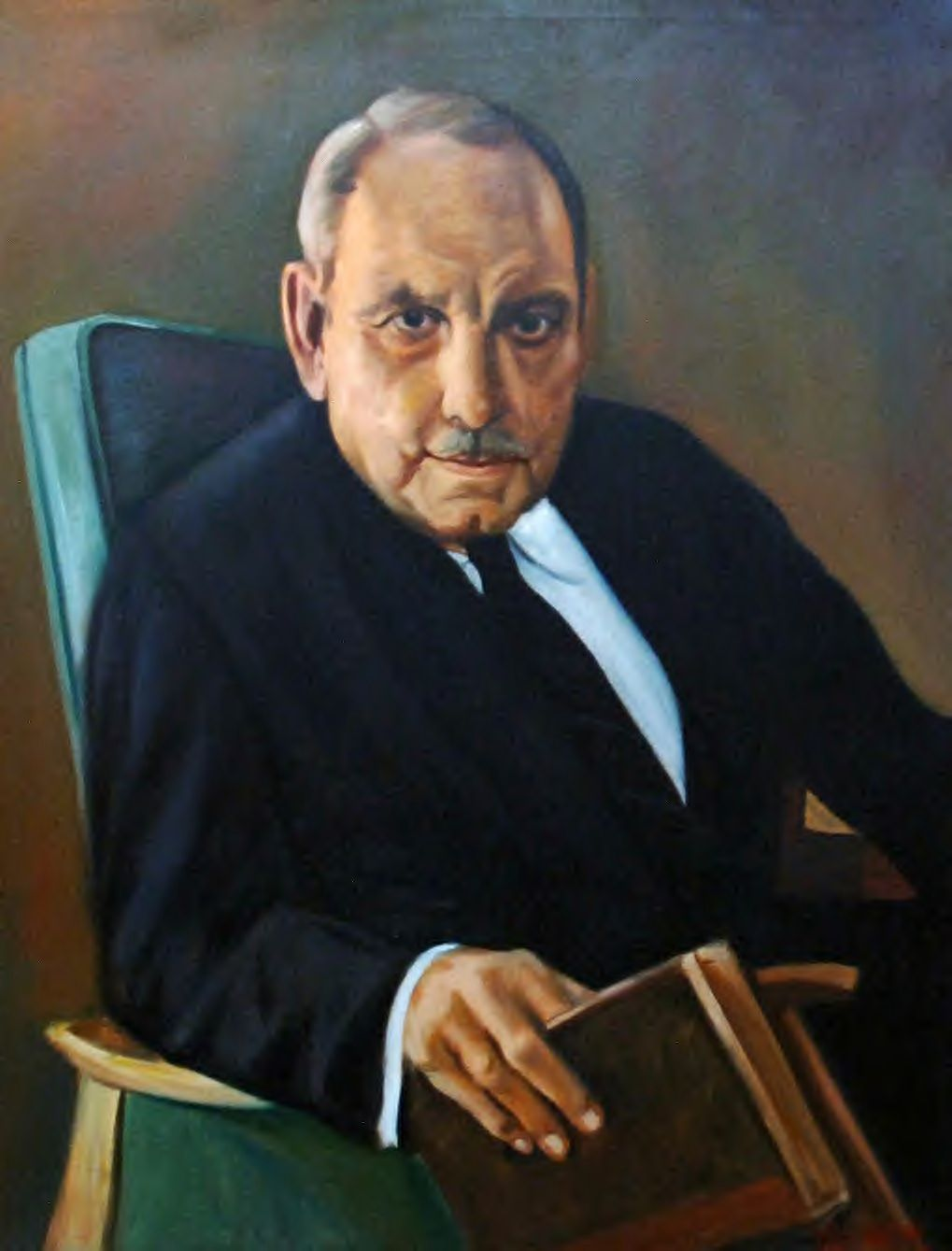

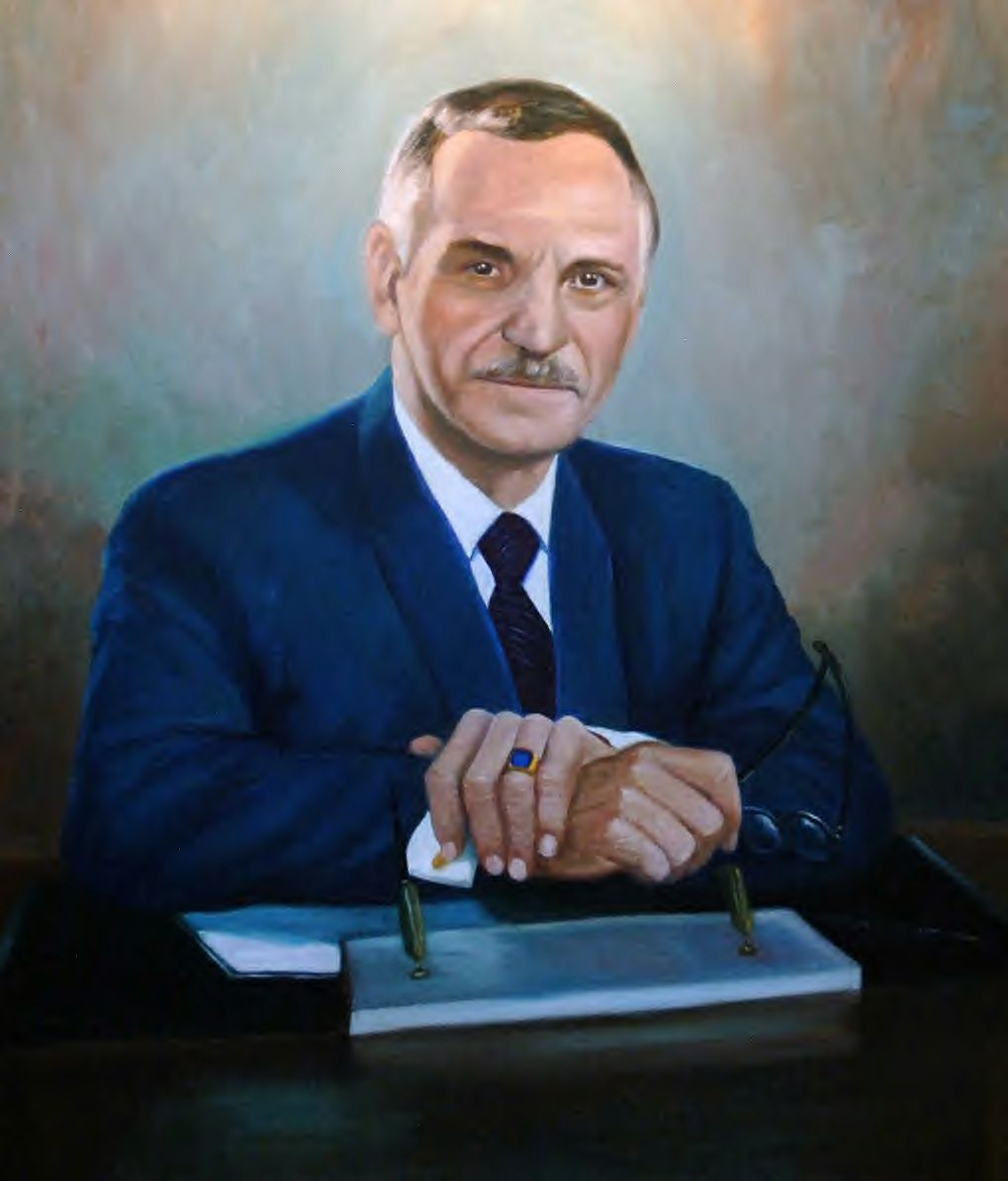

| Nominee | Luis Muñoz Marín | Luis A. Ferré | Salvador Perea Roselló |
| Party | Popular Democratic | PER | PAC |
| Popular vote | 459,759 | 253,242 | 52,275 |
| Percentage | 58.23% | 32.08% | 6.62% |
- Results by municipality Muñoz: 40–50% 50–60% 60–70% 70–80% Ferré: 30–40%
Governor before election
Luis Muñoz Marín
Popular Democratic
Elected Governor
Luis Muñoz Marín
Popular Democratic
- Resident Commissioner election
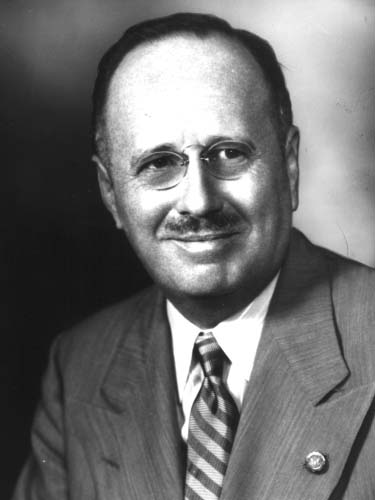

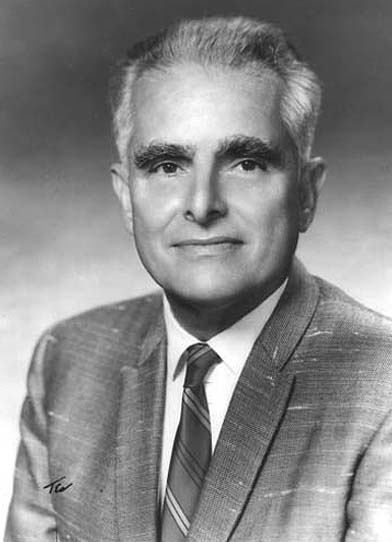
| Nominee | Antonio Fernós Isern | Gabriel de la Haba | Jorge Luis Córdova |
| Party | Popular Democratic | PER | PAC |
| Popular vote | 458,535 | 252,737 | 52,215 |
| Percentage | 58.21% | 32.08% | 6.63% |
- Results by municipality Fernós Isern: 40–50% 50–60% 60–70% 70–80% Haba: 30–40%

General elections were held in Puerto Rico on November 8, 1960. Luis Muñoz Marín of the Popular Democratic Party (PPD) was re-elected as governor, whilst the PPD's Antonio Fernós Isern was re-elected as Resident Commissioner. Voter turnout was 85%.

== Results ==
=== Governor ===
| Candidate | Party | Votes | % |
|---|---|---|---|
| Luis Muñoz Marín | Popular Democratic Party | 459,759 | 58.24 |
| Luis A. Ferré | Partido Estadista Republicano | 253,242 | 32.08 |
| Salvador Perea Roselló | Partido Acción Cristiana | 52,275 | 6.62 |
| Julio García Diaz | Puerto Rican Independence Party | 24,211 | 3.07 |
| Total | | 789,487 | 100.00 |
| Valid votes | | 789,487 | 99.13 |
| Invalid/blank votes | | 6,942 | 0.87 |
| Total votes | | 796,429 | 100.00 |
| Registered voters/turnout | | 941,034 | 84.63 |
Source: Nohlen

=== Resident Commissioner ===
| Candidate | Party | Votes | % |
|---|---|---|---|
| Antonio Fernós-Isern | Popular Democratic Party | 458,535 | 58.21 |
| Gabriel de la Haba | Partido Estadista Republicano | 252,737 | 32.08 |
| Jorge Luis Córdova | Partido Acción Cristiana | 52,215 | 6.63 |
| Roma Marti | Puerto Rican Independence Party | 24,275 | 3.08 |
| Total | | 787,762 | 100.00 |
Source: House of Representatives
