= Miguel A. García Méndez =

Puerto Rican politician

Miguel Angel García Méndez

Member of the Puerto Rico Senate from the at-large district
- In office 1953–1968

Speaker of the Puerto Rico House of Representatives
- In office 1933–1940

Member of the Puerto Rico House of Representatives from the District 18th
- In office 1928–1940

Personal details
- Born: Miguel Angel García Méndez; November 17, 1902 Aguadilla, Puerto Rico
- Died: November 17, 1998 (aged 96) Mayagüez, Puerto Rico
- Spouse: Fredeswinda Ramirez de Arellano Bartoli
- Children: Ileana; Fredewsinda
- Education: University of Puerto Rico School of Law (JD)
- Occupation: Politician; businessman; lawyer

Miguel Angel García Méndez (November 17, 1902 – November 17, 1998) was a Puerto Rican politician, businessman and lawyer. García Méndez served as the 11th Speaker of the House of Representatives of Puerto Rico and later served in the Puerto Rico Senate. He helped found the Republican Statehood Party.

== Studies ==
García Méndez was born in Aguadilla, Puerto Rico. He commenced his law studies in 1917 at the age of 15 in the University of Puerto Rico School of Law. He graduated in 1920 at the age of 19. The Supreme Court of Puerto Rico would not license anyone to practice law under the age of 21. He was however, permitted take the bar exam but, was not officially licensed until 1922.

== Early career ==
His first job after graduating was in the law office of his brothers Juan B. García Méndez (who was a reputable civil practice lawyer) and Manuel A. García Méndez (who was a proficient criminal lawyer). He became a judge in San German and Sabana Grande for a short period of time before opening his own law practice in San German.

== Political career ==
García Méndez was a member of the Puerto Rican Alliance (Spanish: Alianza Puertorriqueña) and in the elections of 1928, was elected to the Puerto Rico House of Representatives by electoral district 18. By 1932, he was a member of the Republican Union and was named to the first Territorial Executive Committee of the Republican Union. In the elections of that year he was re-elected to the House of Representatives by the same district. In the following elections he was re-elected to the House—this time as an at-large candidate (statewide).

At the age of 30 he became the youngest person to be elected as President of the House of Representatives of Puerto Rico, starting his first term in 1933. He was reelected for the term from 1937 to 1941.

In 1939, there was a movement to unify the liberal and the labor party members, dissidents of the Socialist Party. This process led to García Méndez's withdrawal from the Republican Union and his collaboration in the organization of which came to be known as Tripartite Puerto Rican Unification (Spanish: Unificación Puertorriqueña Tripartita or UPT). That same year García Méndez introduced the House Bill 598 creating the Industrial Development Corp. which would promote the economic development of Puerto Rico. The bill was never signed by Gov. Blanton C. Winship. Three years later however, the Industrial Development Co. was created.

In 1940, he ran as candidate of the UPT for Resident Commissioner and in 1941 was chosen vice-president of the UPT. When this party dissolved in 1944, he began to organize the Progressive Republican Union Party, which in 1948 became the Puerto Rican Statehood Party and in 1953 the Republican Statehood Party. In 1952, he was chosen president of the party and elected in that year's election as Senator at large, position from which he resigned. He was re-elected for the same position in the elections of 1956, 1960, and 1964.

In 1952 the year in which Constitution of Puerto Rico was adopted, creating the Commonwealth of Puerto Rico, García Méndez was a member of the Constitutional Convention of Puerto Rico. In 1956, he founded the Partido Estadista Republicano (Republican Statehood Party) and was a delegate to the Republican National Convention from Puerto Rico in 1964.

As head of the Republican Statehood Party, García Méndez boycotted the 1967 status referendum, saying he objected because the results would be non-binding. His position caused a serious division, and numerous party members left to found the New Progressive Party, among them his wife's brother-in-law Luis A. Ferré. This led to the party's dissolution after the 1968 elections when it did not poll the number of votes necessary to retain party registration.

García Méndez was known as "El Pitirre" because of his skills in political debates and ability to mesmerize crowds while speaking in public.

== Businessman ==
The following are García Méndez's business endeavors in chronological order:

1920–1932: Director and secretary for the board of directors of "Banco Caja de Economias y Prestamos de San German".

1937–1940: Member of "Junta de Sindicos" of the University of Puerto Rico.

1940: Presided "Asociacion de Productores de Azucar de Puerto Rico".

Founding Partner of the Banker's Club, Puerto Rico.

García Méndez founded the Western Federal Savings and Loan Association of Puerto Rico (now Westernbank) on March 1, 1958. His grandson Frank C. Stipes was the last president of its board of directors. The W Holding Company was a financial holding corporation located in Mayagüez, Puerto Rico. On April 30, 2010, Westernbank, its wholly owned bank subsidiary, failed and its deposits and assets were seized by the Federal Deposit Insurance Corporation and subsequently sold to Banco Popular de Puerto Rico.

In the 1960s he co-founded with Efrain Kier a construction company called Atlantic Quality Construction; later on Leon Rubin joined them. The same constructed the Beach Tower and Park Plaza in Isla Verde, the Ashford Imperial in Condado among others.

In the 1970s he bought the newspaper El Imparcial. but its headquarters was destroyed in a fire (whose cause has remained unknown) and closed down.

== Written works ==
- Puerto Rico, Eslabon de las Americas.
- La Universidad de Puerto Rico como Universidad Panamericana.
- Cartas al Pueblo.
- La Solucion al Status Politico Final de Puerto Rico.

== Personal life ==
He married Fredeswinda Ramirez de Arellano Bartoli on June 25, 1926, in Mayagüez, Puerto Rico. He had two daughters, Ileana and Fredewsinda. García Méndez died on November 17, 1998, on his 96th birthday, in Mayagüez.

== Honors ==
After graduating from the University of Puerto Rico in 1920, he received a prize from Princeton University for his thesis on Constitutional Law.

On 1993 the "Asociacion Productos de Puerto Rico" presented him with the prize named "Industrial Emeritus Antonio R. Barcelo" for his long and brilliant career as an industrialist in Puerto Rico.

On November 17, 1999, the Puerto Rico House of Representatives declared November 17 the official day of Miguel Ángel García Méndez.

On a bill passed by United States Congress to named the Miguel Angel García Méndez Post Office Building in Mayagüez, his hometown, that bears his name. and there is also an avenue "Avenida Miguel Ángel García Méndez" in his honor.

Among the other honors are "Paseo Miguel Angel García Méndez" in Aguadilla, Puerto Rico, and a statue of him which was placed in the Capitol Building on February 13, 2006.

Public law #19 (Ley Núm. 19) of June 16, 2005, created the "Miguel Ángel García Méndez Legislative Oratory Prize" (Premio Legislativo à la Oratoria Miguel Ángel García Méndez)

== See also ==
- List of Puerto Ricans
- List of political parties in Puerto Rico
- Politics of Puerto Rico

Political offices
Preceded by Rafael Alonso Torres	Speaker of the Puerto Rico House of Representatives; 1933–1940	Succeeded by Samuel R. Quiñones
Party political offices
Preceded by Celestino Iriarte Miró	Chairman of the Puerto Rico Republican Party; 1952–1975	Succeeded by Luis A. Ferré
