= 1964 Puerto Rican general election =

- November 3, 1964
- Gubernatorial election
- Turnout: 83.90%
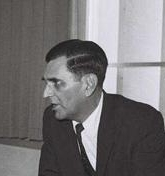

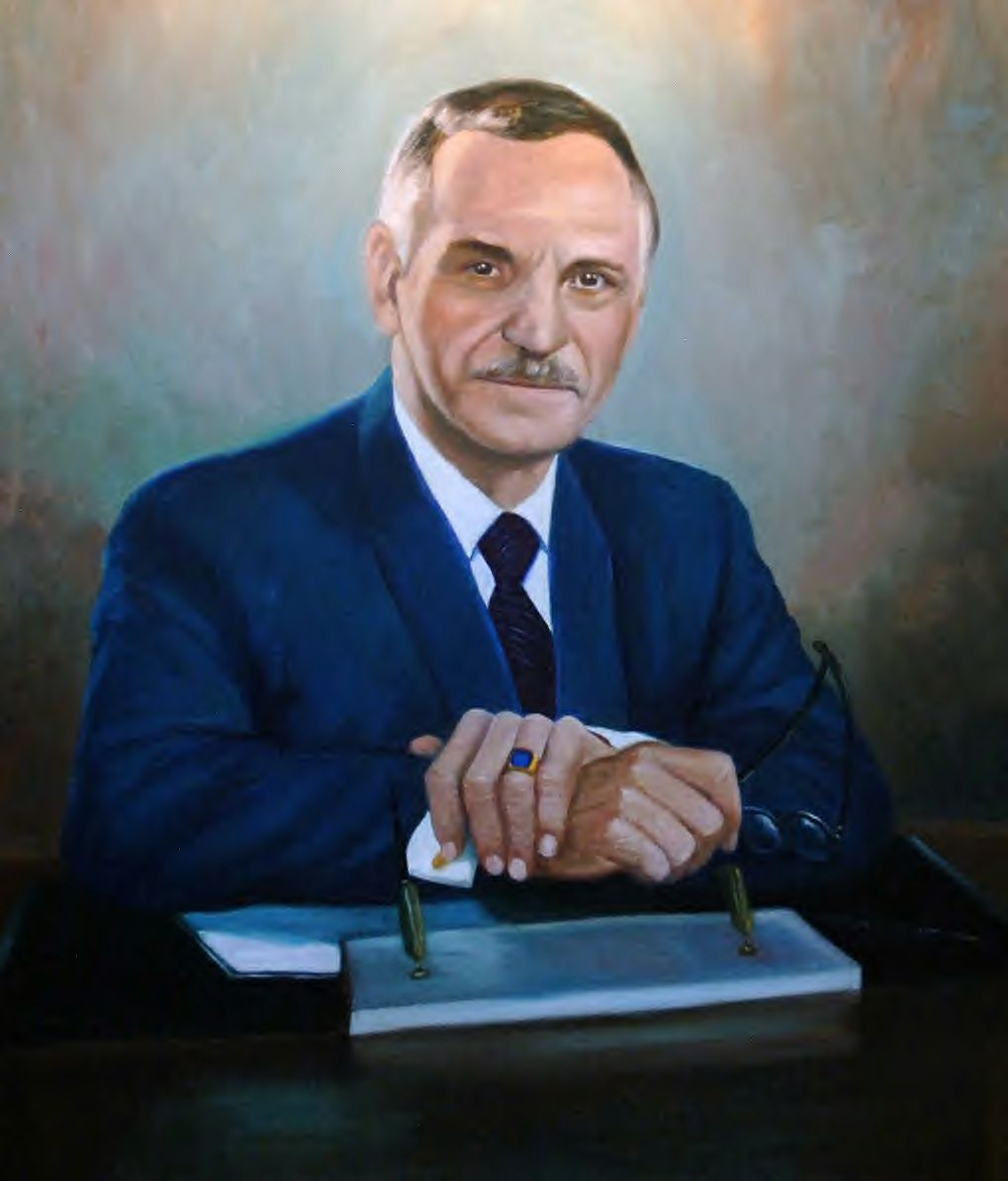
| Nominee | Roberto Sánchez Vilella | Luis A. Ferré |
| Party | Popular Democratic | PER |
| Popular vote | 492,531 | 288,504 |
| Percentage | 59.24% | 34.70% |
- Results by municipality Sánchez Vilella: 40–50% 50–60% 60–70% 70–80%
Governor before election
Luis Muñoz Marín
Popular Democratic
Elected Governor
Roberto Sánchez Vilella
Popular Democratic
- Resident Commissioner election
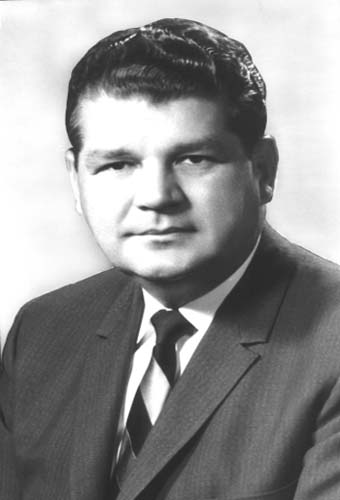

| Nominee | Santiago Polanco-Abreu | Manuel Iglesias |
| Party | Popular Democratic | PER |
| Popular vote | 492,095 | 287,309 |
| Percentage | 59.30% | 34.62% |

General elections were held in Puerto Rico on November 3, 1964. Roberto Sánchez Vilella of the Popular Democratic Party (PPD) was elected Governor, whilst the PPD's Santiago Polanco-Abreu was elected Resident Commissioner. Voter turnout was 84%.

== Results ==
=== Governor ===
| Candidate | Party | Votes | % |
|---|---|---|---|
| Roberto Sánchez Vilella | Popular Democratic Party | 492,531 | 59.24 |
| Luis A. Ferré | Partido Estadista Republicano | 288,504 | 34.70 |
| Francisco González Baena | Partido Acción Cristiana | 27,076 | 3.26 |
| Gilberto Concepción de Gracia | Puerto Rican Independence Party | 23,340 | 2.81 |
| Total | | 831,451 | 100.00 |
| Valid votes | | 831,451 | 99.02 |
| Invalid/blank votes | | 8,227 | 0.98 |
| Total votes | | 839,678 | 100.00 |
| Registered voters/turnout | | 1,002,000 | 83.80 |
Source: Nohlen

=== Resident Commissioner ===
| Candidate | Party | Votes | % |
|---|---|---|---|
| Santiago Polanco-Abreu | Popular Democratic Party | 492,095 | 59.30 |
| Manuel Iglesias | Partido Estadista Republicano | 287,309 | 34.62 |
| Roberto Lopez-Candal | Partido Acción Cristiana | 27,338 | 3.29 |
| José Antonio Ortiz | Puerto Rican Independence Party | 23,159 | 2.79 |
| Total | | 829,901 | 100.00 |
Source: House of Representatives
