= Isolina Ferré =

Roman Catholic nun from Puerto Rico

Isolina Ferré Aguayo
- Born: 5 September 1914; Ponce, Puerto Rico
- Died: 3 August 2000 (aged 85); Ponce, Puerto Rico
- Resting place: Las Mercedes Memorial Park
- Occupation: Roman Catholic nun
- Known for: Humanitarian work
- Parents: Antonio Ferré; Mary Aguayo

Sor Isolina Ferré Aguayo (5 September 1914 – 3 August 2000) was a Puerto Rican Roman Catholic religious sister. Known as the "Mother Teresa of Puerto Rico", she received the Presidential Medal of Freedom in recognition of her humanitarian work.

Ferré Aguayo was born in Ponce to a wealthy family. She was one of six siblings, Jose, Carlos, Hernan, Rosario and Luis, Puerto Rico's former governor. When she was 21, Ferré traveled to the United States where she commenced her novitiate. After five years, she completed the solemn vows. As part of her religious work, Ferré traveled back and forth between Puerto Rico and the United States, serving as an abbess in Cabo Rojo and New York City.

During this time frame, she attended various universities in the United States, studying sociology and arts. After working as a member of New York City's Committee Against Poverty, to which she was appointed by Mayor John Lindsay, Ferré decided in 1969, to set her permanent residence in Ponce, specifically in the low-income sector of La Playa. There she founded a small hospital and a school/resource center named Centro de Orientación y Servicios de La Playa de Ponce. The school/resource center would later become Centros Sor Isolina Ferré and opened numerous outlets throughout Puerto Rico at large. Ferré Aguayo is a member of Mu Alpha Phi sorority.

== Early life ==
Ferré was born in Ponce, Puerto Rico, to Antonio Ferré and Mary Aguayo. Born into a wealthy family of recent European background, she was one of six children. Her siblings included Luis, José, Carlos, Rosario, and Hermán Ferré. Throughout the years, the Ferré family owned several companies in Puerto Rico, ranging from factories to newspapers. However, she was inclined towards a religious life from a young age. Her father was Catholic, but left the church when, at the request of a dying friend, he joined the Freemasons. The other members of the family attended a church named Iglesia de la Monserrate located in Hormigueros.

Her mother used to spend her time in benevolent activities, often donating toys to orphaned children. Her mother contracted Filaria, which limited her social and personal activities, therefore Saro, Ferré's older sister, became responsible for the upbringing of the younger children. When she was three years old, Ferré entered a religious school named Colegio de las Madres del Sagrado Corazón, where she became interested in the habits practiced by the nuns. Ferré traveled throughout Ponce with some of the family's employees, becoming familiar with the neighborhoods and their inhabitants. When she was young, Ferré believed that poverty was a voluntary economic state of being however, during her adolescence she realized that it wasn't so and that she was wrong in her way of thinking. During this timeframe she practiced tennis and cycling, and taught Catechism.

== Religious career ==
=== Novitiate ===
When she was sixteen years old, Ferré enrolled at the University of Puerto Rico's campus in Río Piedras. She subsequently moved to the Orden De Las Siervas Misioneras De La Santisima Trinidad (Congregation Of The Missionary Servants Of The Most Blessed Trinity, MSBT), where she resided while studying. While in the university, Ferré developed an interest in opera and literature. She continued practicing tennis, eventually practicing with Rebekah Colberg. Shortly after completing her first semester, Ferré returned to her home, where she was informed that her mother was in critical condition. Her mother died the next morning, moments after her son Luis arrived from the United States. Ferré resumed her studies with intensity and during this time she also worked and played tennis. Her health was affected because of her strenuous activities and after she went to her doctor and had a radiology done, she was told that she had damage in her lungs and was recommended that she take one year of rest. The condition worsened and she moved to Adjuntas briefly, until the symptoms completely disappeared one month later. Jose Ferré (her brother) became a member of Luis Muñoz Marín's government. He told her about the details of Operation Bootstrap and Operation Serenity. Interested in this second project, she organized a group of delivery boys and shoe shiners and founded a candy distribution system. Ferré and some friends also preached to workers in sugar plantations, often visiting their houses in the evening. She left her family's house to join a convent shortly after her 21st birthday, after receiving permission from her father. Before entering the convent, she decided to swear a chastity vow. After arriving in Philadelphia, she spent her first year involved in a series of religious activities, including some "spiritual exercises" where she was only allowed to speak in the confessional. Her first mission took place in the small town of Norton, Virginia. There she met with the priest of a community of Polish miners and together they performed a series of domestic labors. She continued working on other missions, receiving occasional visits from her siblings. She eventually joined a Novitiate in New York City. In this convent, she was one of the few novices that knew how to drive an automobile and served as the convent's driver. While in New York, Ferré felt symptoms of appendicitis, and was rushed to a Philadelphia hospital.

=== Work as a nun and Mother Superior ===
Five years after serving in the missions, Ferré swore the solemn vows. She was subsequently transferred from Long Island to Cabo Rojo per request of Ponce's Bishop. Upon arriving, she was received by a procession. As part of this mission, She and the nuns organized baseball teams and sewing schools. She continued working in this convent for 11 years, until she was promoted to abbess. As Mother Superior, Ferré remained in Cabo Rojo for six more years, which is the time limit that a Mother Superior can work within the a mission before receiving another assignment. She was then sent to Hato Rey, where she was assigned to a religious school. Here she replaced part of the institution's materials with new ones, using part of a savings account created by the previous directory. Shortly after she contracted Sepsis, and was removed from the position. Some time later Ferré traveled to the Bronx, where several of the nuns that studied with her in Philadelphia resided. This congregation focused their attention in discouraging street crime. One day, Ferré was forced to dress a gang member in nun's clothing, to confuse the members of a rival gang. Due to her actions, she was promoted to abbess of the convent. She led the other nuns in an effort to revitalize the city's landscape. New York's governor Nelson Rockefeller, awarded her the city's "Republican Woman" recognition. The community elected her as their official representative in New York's "Committee Against Poverty", but she declined the offer and granted the position to another Puerto Rican resident. She did this because Mayor John Lindsay had previously appointed her as his personal representative. Ferré focused her work in promoting education among street gangs. The convent, interested in promoting community acceptance regardless of religion, was originally called "Dr. White Catholic Center" was renamed "Dr. White Center". During this timeframe she continued her education, briefly attending Holly Family College and completing her bachelor's degree at St. Joseph's College for Women. After a stint as a teacher in Philadelphia, she was sent back to New York in order to complete and further her studies. Ferré completed a sociology master's degree at Fordham University, submitting a thesis based in the strengths and weaknesses of Puerto Rican families that faced conditions of discrimination and poverty after migrating to the city. Her final work in the United States took place in Chicago, where she coached a group of Puerto Rican community leaders.

=== Founding Centros Sor Isolina Ferré ===
In 1968, she returned to Barrio La Playa in Ponce where the Ferré family had built a dispensary to treat vesicular conditions. She was operated and remained in rest for a month, spending this period visiting adjacent barrios and reading. Ferré then began promoting community restructuring by rehabilitating several buildings with the help of her brother Jose. She was responsible for the opening of a small clinic and school named Centro de Orientacion y Servicios de La Playa de Ponce (Ponce Playa Orientation and Services Center), dedicated to providing educational opportunities, extracurricular activities, and day care services to low-income families. With the cooperation of a Methodist reverend, she also founded an industrial sewing school. They also formed a baseball team named Las Latas Stars and an equestrian club. Ferré promoted cultural events, reestablished traditional celebrations and organized activities focused on theatrics, ballet, modeling and sports. Seeking to address a personnel deficiency in nearby petrochemical factories, Teodoro Moscoso suggested to them the creation of a welding school. The institution was built adjacent to Puerto Rico Iron Works, a company that belonged to the Ferré family, and which remained active until 1972. This initiative was followed by a photography laboratory, which served to illustrate El Playero, a local magazine.

Ferré and the community of La Playa designed a proposal to work with juvenile delinquents, by suggesting that they should be placed under custody by their community and that they should be treated with respect instead of as criminals. The program was based in a system designed by Charles Grosser named "Advocacy", eventually becoming known as "Advocacy Puerto Rican Style". This method gathered interest from community leaders in the United States, who were interested in establishing similar programs. The program also gathered interest from politicians, to which she suggested the creation of the Centro Diagnostico y de Tratamiento de la Playa de Ponce (Ponce Playa Diagnostic and Treatment Center). Ferré and the community received a grant of one million dollars to build the institution, which was built in a lot in barrio El Ciclón. While attempting to eliminate prostitution, Ferré rented a building which was once used as a bar, opening a technological center at that location. In 1975, the Center faced some financial losses, following a fire and a flood, when Hurricane Eloise passed hit Puerto Rico. By this time a series of small centers had been founded, as part of an initiative that was denominated "religious urban guerrilla". Due to this the organization's work continued uninterrupted, temporarily moving their operations to a location in an adjacent barrio.

Ferré established the center's headquarters in a building that used to belong to the employees of her father, which had been renamed Dispensario San Antonio years earlier. This was donated to a local convent, who turned it into a corporation in 1950. Ferré used of her own wealth to created charities not only in Puerto Rico, but in New York City and the Appalachia as well. The community of La Playa changed the name of the institution from Centro de Orientacion de La Playa to Centros Sister Isolina Ferré to honor her memory. Saatchi & Saatchi, the advertising agency in charge of the center's publicity, subsequently effected the name change.

== Later years ==
Awarded the Presidential Medal of Freedom in 1999

She was elected as a delegate in the "World Conference of the United Nations Decade for Women", organized in 1980. When interviewed, Ferré stated that while the organization is run by nuns from the state and donations from the private industry, she tried to keep both of them separated from the church. During the 1980s, most of the funds for Centros Sor Isolina Ferré were provided by Rafael Hernández Colón, who promoted the establishment of a new center in Caimito, Puerto Rico. One day, Ferré decided to intervene in a hostage situation, where two young men were threatening to open fire if the police entered their house. She was able to enter the house and the father confessed that he was responsible for the incident, after he hit one of his sons as punishment. The two men used the distraction to escape by jumping to the sea, but went to Ferré's center in search of medical attention. She contacted the police, and convinced them that they would not be arrested if they went to a hospital. This convinced her that the community needed more police attention, eventually employing a Japanese initiative named Koban. Based on this, a group of officers moved to one of the residences that comprised Caimito's center, visiting the other houses on a daily basis. When Hurricane Hugo struck Puerto Rico, Centros Sor Isolina Ferré cultivated 10,000 trees in a greenhouse, intending to help the government deal with the deforestation left by the storm. One day, Mother Teresa visited Ferré while she was preparing an educational initiative. Both nuns discussed theology and social and humanitarian work, coming to the conclusion that while they used different methods, their goal was the same. On the morning of 22 July 1985 Ferré suffered a heart attack. She remained in hospital for some weeks before undergoing Cardiac surgery. In 1989, she was selected to receive the Albert Schweitzer Prize for Humanitarianism.

By the 1990s, the Centers had created 50 different initiatives, of which 40 proved successful. In 1993, Ferré received the Hispanic Heritage Award in the "Education" category. In March of that year, Ferré organized the first International Congress of Centros Sor Isolina Ferré, which focused in community development and youth upbringing. The activity was attended by several religious and political figures. That same year, the center also reported that their social programs directed towards juvenile crime had been successful, reducing the frequency of crime in the locations adjacent to the centers by 20 percent.

Ferré's efforts in La Playa were written and chronicled in Puerto Rican books and newspapers, as well as the publications of other Latin American countries including the Dominican Republic and Venezuela. She earned twelve honorary doctorates from diverse educational institutions, and more than 64 organizations awarded her recognitions. Her work was recognized by President Bill Clinton who awarded her the Presidential Medal of Freedom at a ceremony in the White House, an honor previously also bestowed upon her brother Luis A. Ferré.

== Declining health and death ==
In early 2000, Ferré began experiencing some health problems, but her health improved somewhat that July. However shortly after that she began experiencing respiratory problems and was hospitalized at the Hospital de Damas in Ponce. Ferré died on 3 August 2000, shortly before her 86th birthday. By then she had provided over half a century of public service. Her body was buried in Las Mercedes cemetery.

== Legacy ==
After Ferré's death, the Centers which she founded continued to operate under the direction of José Díaz Coto. With help from Puerto Rico's Department of Family and the Department of Justice, preventive programs have been added to the Centers offerings. On 16 May 2008 the institution reported a reduction of 2% in juvenile delinquency in sectors adjacent to its Centers in Ponce. Her contributions in civic duty are also recognized at the Park for the Illustrious Ponce Citizens in her hometown of Ponce.

On 29 May 2014 the Legislative Assembly of Puerto Rico honored Ferré as one of twelve women who, by virtue of their merits and legacies, stand out in the history of Puerto Rico. Their plaques were unveiled in the "La Plaza en Honor a la Mujer Puertorriqueña" (Plaza in Honor of Puerto Rican Women) in San Juan.

== See also ==
- List of Puerto Ricans
- Roman Catholicism in Puerto Rico
- List of Puerto Rican Presidential Medal of Freedom recipients
- History of women in Puerto Rico
