= Luis A. Ferré =

Governor of Puerto Rico (1904–2003)

Luis Ferré
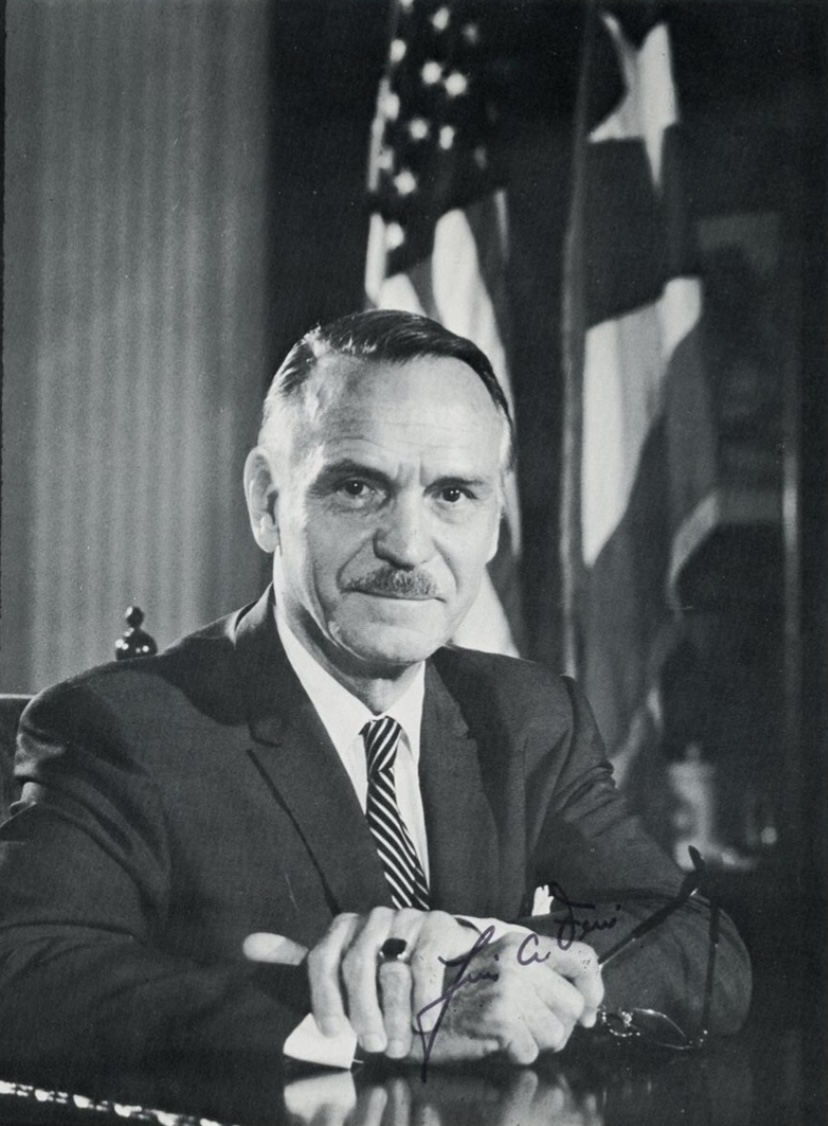
- Ferré in 1969

8th President of the Puerto Rico Senate
- In office January 1977 – January 1981
- Preceded by: Juan J. Cancel Ríos
- Succeeded by: Miguel Hernández Agosto

Governor of Puerto Rico
- In office January 2, 1969 – January 2, 1973
- Preceded by: Roberto Sánchez Vilella
- Succeeded by: Rafael Hernández Colón

Personal details
- Born: Luis Alberto Ferré-Aguayo; February 17, 1904 Ponce, Porto Rico (now Puerto Rico)
- Died: October 21, 2003 (aged 99) San Juan, Puerto Rico
- Party: Republican Statehood (before 1967); New Progressive (1967–2003)
- Other political affiliations: Republican
- Spouses: Lorenza Ramírez de Arellano (m. 1931; died 1970); Tiody De Jesús (m. 1980)
- Children: Rosario; Antonio
- Education: Massachusetts Institute of Technology (BS, MS); New England Conservatory of Music (attended)

Don Luis Alberto Ferré Aguayo (February 17, 1904 – October 21, 2003), most commonly known as Luis A. Ferré, was a Puerto Rican engineer, industrialist, politician, philanthropist, and patron of the arts who served as the third democratically elected governor of Puerto Rico from 1969 to 1973. Ferré previously served as an at-large member of the House of Representatives of Puerto Rico from 1953 to 1957. After his governorship, he served as the eighth president of the Senate of Puerto Rico from 1977 to 1981.

Founder of the pro-statehood New Progressive Party in 1967, Ferré opposed the political status of Puerto Rico as an unincorporated territory of the United States, promoting instead Puerto Rican statehood, or the incorporation of the archipelago and island into the United States as a state. He advocated support for the admission of Puerto Rico into the Union from the start of his political career as an unsuccessful nominee for Resident Commissioner of Puerto Rico under the Puerto Rican Statehood Party in 1948. He was awarded the Presidential Medal of Freedom by President George H. W. Bush in 1989.

== Early life ==
Luis Alberto Ferré Aguayo was born in the southern city of Ponce, Puerto Rico, on February 17, 1904. Ferré's grandfather Maurice Ferré Perotín was a French engineer who was involved in the construction of the Panama Canal before settling in Cuba. Ferré's father, Antonio Ferré Bagayado or "Bacallao", was born in Havana, Cuba and grew up there. As a young man he immigrated to Puerto Rico, where he founded the company Puerto Rico Iron Works, in Barrio Playa de Ponce, Ponce, Puerto Rico. In Puerto Rico, Antonio Ferré met and married María Aguayo Casals, a cousin of both Catalan cellist Pablo Casals (whose mother was a Puerto Rico-born Catalan musician) and Carmelita Defilló Sanz (wife to Dominican politician and historian Manuel Arturo Peña Batlle and mother of Dominican paintist Fernando Peña Defilló). Antonio and María had four sons, Luis, José, Carlos and Hermán Ferré, and two daughters, Rosario and Isolina; the latter would become a nun of international prominence.

Ferré studied mechanical engineering at the Massachusetts Institute of Technology, obtaining his bachelor's degree in 1924 and master's degree in 1925, and music at the New England Conservatory of Music. While at MIT he was part of the Army ROTC. While living in Boston, Ferré developed an admiration for the "American way of democracy".

== Industrialist ==
Upon his return to Puerto Rico, Ferré helped transform his father's company into a successful business from which he earned a fortune. In 1948, he acquired El Día, a fledgling newspaper that was later renamed El Nuevo Día, which became the newspaper with the largest circulation in Puerto Rico at the time. In the 1950s, Ferré's Empresas Ferré (Ferre Enterprises) acquired Puerto Rico Cement and Ponce Cement, which capitalized on the economic boom which Puerto Rico enjoyed based on the ambitious industrialization projects undertaken in association with the Operation Bootstrap. Ferré's brother, José, had moved to Miami with his family. His son Maurice expanded a successful business there, selling bagged pre-mixed cement and sand under the name Mezcla Lista. Maurice Ferré was elected Mayor of Miami.

== Political life ==
Ferré became active in politics in the 1940s. He unsuccessfully ran for mayor of Ponce in 1940 and Resident Commissioner of Puerto Rico in 1948.

=== Representative ===
In 1948, Puerto Ricans were allowed to elect their governor; previously the position was filled by appointment by the United States president. Luis Muñoz Marín was elected governor of Puerto Rico. A movement began which aimed to adopt a commonwealth relationship with the United States of America. In 1951, a referendum was held to decide whether to approve or not the option granted by the United States Congress to draft Puerto Rico's first constitution. Ferré abstained from participating in the process; the pro-statehood party to which he belonged favored the 1951 referendum. He believed that the process would mean "an acceptance of a colony and condemn the people to a perpetual condition of second class citizenship". Ferré later participated in the constitutional assembly created by the referendum, which drafted the constitution.

In 1952 the Constitution of Puerto Rico was adopted, renaming the body politic of the territory of Puerto Rico as the Commonwealth of Puerto Rico. Ferré was elected as a member of the Constitutional Assembly. That same year Ferré was elected representative in the Puerto Rico House of Representatives. He ran under the Republican Statehood Party ("Partido Estadista Republicano") and officially assumed his duties as representative on January 11, 1953.

=== Governor and Senator ===
Ferre speaking at a Phi Sigma Alpha event in the 1970s

On July 23, 1967, a plebiscite was held to decide if the people of Puerto Rico desired to become an independent nation, a state of the United States of America, or continue the commonwealth relation established in 1952. The majority of Puerto Ricans opted for the Commonwealth option (see Puerto Rican status referendums). Disagreement within the then pro-statehood party headed by Miguel A. García Méndez led Ferré and others to found the New Progressive Party (a.k.a., PNP).

According to declassified documents in 2025, Ferré worked as an asset (codename SKEWER-1) for the CIA during the Cold War. He was tapped in 1957 to help oust the Dominican Republic's Pres. Rafael Trujillo (and to a lesser extent help Cuban exiles after Fidel Castro to power in Cuba). One of the redacted archives state that the U.S. didn't even have to pay Ferre for he was driven by the “suasion of patriotism.”

In the following general election in 1968, Ferré ran for Governor and defeated Luis Negrón López, the candidate of the Popular Democratic Party (PPD) by a slight margin. The ruling party had split with the creation of the People's Party, which ran incumbent PDP-elected Governor Roberto Sánchez Vilella as its gubernatorial candidate, ending Luis Muñoz Marín's PPD's hold on the governor's seat, which had lasted 20 years.

During Ferré's administration, Puerto Rico was in an economic boom at 7% GDP growth and the unemployment at 10%. His work as governor of Puerto Rico included defending the federal minimum wage and granting workers a Christmas bonus. He visited Puerto Rican troops in Vietnam. In 1970, his first wife, Lorencita, died at La Fortaleza after being bed-ridden for years. Their daughter, Rosario Ferré, an acclaimed novelist and writer, stepped into the role of First Lady.

During his governorship, he paid special attention to youth affairs and bringing young Puerto Ricans into public service. He successfully had the Puerto Rico Constitution amended to lower the voting age to 18, strongly supported the New Progressive Party Youth organization as party president, appointed then-young statehooders such as Antonio Quiñones Calderón and Francisco "Pompi" González to high-level administration jobs, campaigned for a 26-year-old at large House candidate, nominated a future Senate President and Secretary of State, teenager Kenneth McClintock as Puerto Rico delegate to the 1971 White House Conference on Youth, and strengthened college scholarship programs.

Before the Congress created the United States Environmental Protection Agency in 1971, Ferré had already created Puerto Rico's Environmental Quality Board in 1970, charged with protecting the islands' environment.

In the elections of 1972 he sought reelection but lost to Rafael Hernández Colón of the PPD. The PPD had claimed that many corruption scandals had been overlooked by the Ferré administration. A bloody student strike at the University of Puerto Rico at Río Piedras in 1971 had been neutralized by the Puerto Rican police using brute force, something about which Ferré had mixed feelings. Hernández emphasized his youth during the campaign, and became the youngest Puerto Rican governor upon election. All these issues, along with the reunification of the People's Party and the PPD, contributed to a PPD win over Ferré in the election.

Ferré remained active in politics and in 1976, he was elected to the Senate of Puerto Rico. Ferré served as the eighth president of the Senate from 1977 to 1981 and continued serving as senator until 1985.

Years after leaving La Fortaleza, he married Tiody De Jesús, a nurse who later became a physician.

Ferre attended every Republican National Convention from 1964 through 1988. This streak ended in 1992 only because Ferre had undergone back surgery the week prior to the 1992 Republican National Convention and could not travel to the convention.

After serving as senator, Ferré continued to be active in politics, especially representing the United States Republican Party on the island. Between 1989 and 1991, Ferré served with former Governor Carlos Romero Barceló, former representative Benny Frankie Cerezo, PNP leader Kenneth McClintock and former congressional staffer David Gerken as the New Progressive Party's negotiating team while Congress considered Puerto Rico political status legislation introduced by Senator J. Bennett Johnston.

== Renaissance man ==
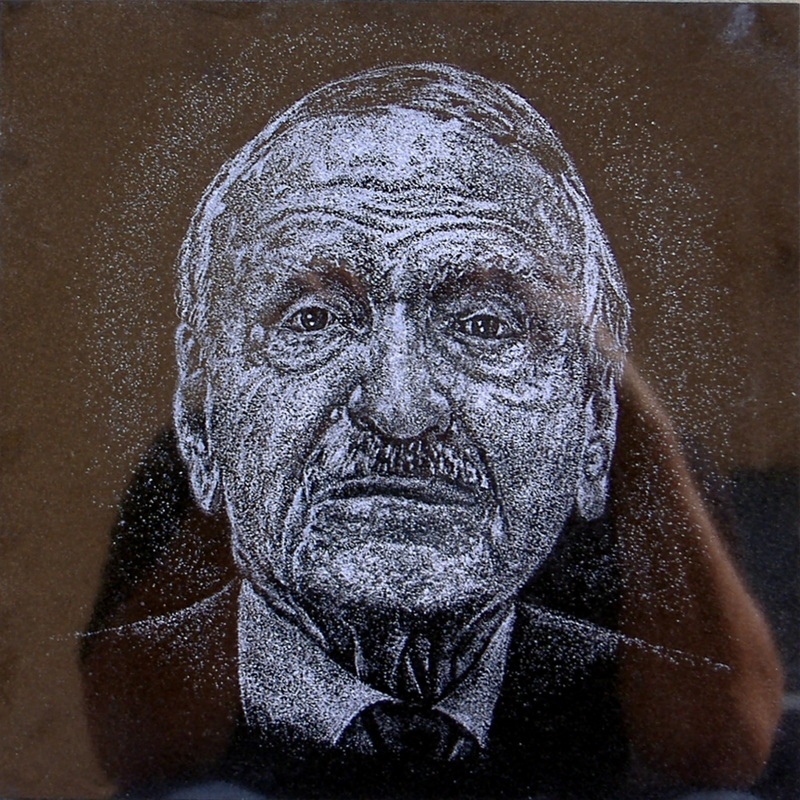
Hand-etched portrait over black granite by artist Osvaldo Torres at Cruzacalles, Mayagüez, Puerto Rico.

Ferré was also a talented pianist who recorded several albums of his piano music. On January 3, 1959, he founded the Museo de Arte de Ponce, in his hometown of Ponce. The museum initially displayed 71 paintings from his personal collection and today displays over 3,000 pieces. Among other things, Ferré is credited with having rescued from oblivion the painting Flaming June by the Victorian painter Frederic Lord Leighton – purchasing it in 1963, when it was considered "too old fashioned" and getting it prominently displayed at the Museo of Arte de Ponce. El Centro de Bellas Artes, the center for performing arts in Santurce, Puerto Rico also bears his name, as well as the main highway connecting San Juan and Ponce. He also assisted in the creation of the Casals Festival and the Puerto Rico Conservatory of Music. He was a member of Phi Sigma Alpha fraternity. As a sportsman, Ferré practiced fencing, and is honored annually with the "Campeonato Nacional de Esgrima" in Puerto Rico.

Awarded the Presidential Medal of Freedom in 1991

His philanthropic deeds and defense for democracy earned him the Presidential Medal of Freedom, awarded by President George H. W. Bush on November 18, 1991.

== Death and legacy ==
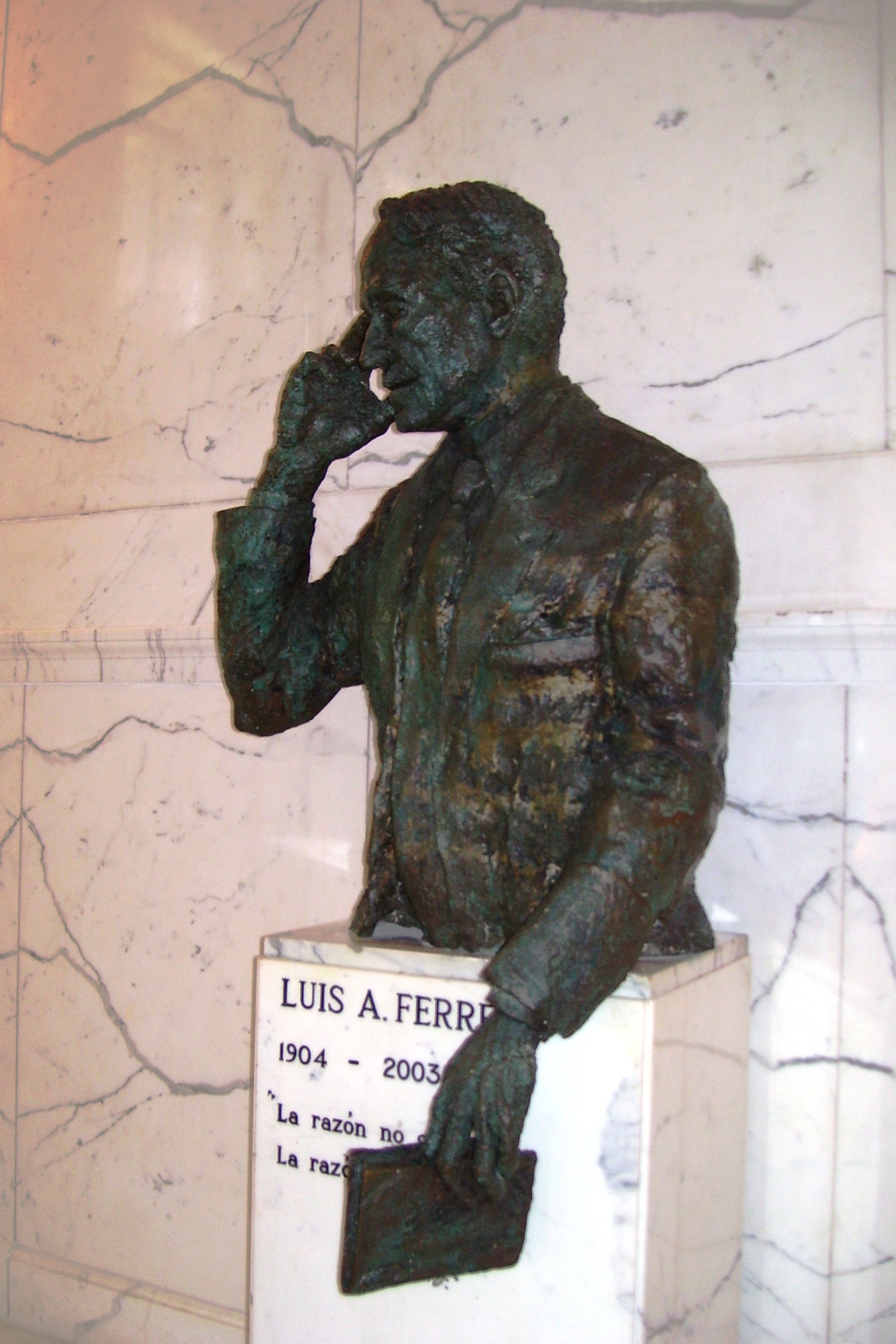
Sculpture of Ferré inside the Capitol of Puerto Rico

On September 29, 2003, Ferré was hospitalized with a urinary tract infection and underwent surgery for an intestinal blockage on October 1. While in the hospital, he developed pneumonia before finally succumbing to respiratory failure on the morning of October 21, 2003. He was 99 years old.

His body lay in state in Puerto Rico's capitol building in San Juan, then transported to his museum in Ponce, before being taken for a state funeral and burial in that city. His funeral and ceremonies honoring him were attended by numerous politicians. He is interred at the Las Mercedes Memorial Park in Ponce.

Among the awards that were bestowed on Luis A. Ferré was the Presidential Medal of Freedom, an honor which was also subsequently bestowed on his sister Sor Isolina Ferre. The sculptor Tomás Batista was also commissioned to make a bust of Ferré, which is exhibited in the Ponce Museum of Art. Another Tomás Batista bust of him was unveiled by his widow, Tiody, Senate President Kenneth McClintock and Senate Vice President Orlando Parga in February, 2008 at the Senate of Puerto Rico's Hall of Governors.

In 2004 the historic United States Courthouse and Post Office Building in Ponce, Puerto Rico was named the Luis A. Ferré United States Courthouse and Post Office Building by an Act of the U.S. Congress.

The segment of Las Américas Avenue that includes the Museo de Arte de Ponce and the Pontifical Catholic University of Puerto Rico was renamed the Luis A. Ferré Boulevard in November, 2010, in his honor.

== See also ==
- Sor Isolina Ferré
- The Last Sleep of Arthur in Avalon
- List of governors of Puerto Rico
- List of political parties in Puerto Rico
- Politics of Puerto Rico
- List of Puerto Rican Presidential Medal of Freedom recipients

Party political offices
Preceded by Francisco López Domínguez	Republican Statehood nominee for Governor of Puerto Rico; 1956, 1960, 1964	Party abolished
New office	Chair of the Puerto Rico New Progressive Party; 1967–1974	Succeeded by Carlos Romero Barceló
New political party	New Progressive nominee for Governor of Puerto Rico; 1968, 1972	Succeeded by Carlos Romero Barceló
Preceded by Miguel A. García Méndez	Chair of the Puerto Rico Republican Party; 1975–2004	Succeeded by Ángel Cintrón García
Political offices
Preceded by Roberto Sánchez Vilella	Governor of Puerto Rico; 1969–1973	Succeeded by Rafael Hernández Colón
Preceded by Juan J. Cancel Ríos	President of the Puerto Rico Senate; 1977–1981	Succeeded by Miguel Hernández Agosto
