= Partido Estadista Republicano =

Political party in Puerto Rico

Republican Statehood Party Partido Estadista Republicano
- Abbreviation: PER
- Founded: 1956
- Dissolved: 1968; 58 years ago
- Preceded by: Partido Estadista Puertorriqueño
- Merged into: New Progressive Party
- Headquarters: San Juan, Puerto Rico
- Ideology: Statehood; Conservatism
- Political position: Centre-right

The Partido Estadista Republicano (English: Republican Statehood Party) was a political party in Puerto Rico that operated from 1956 to 1968. Its president was Miguel A. García Méndez. The party formed in 1952 after Partido Estadista Puertorriqueño became "Partido Estadista Republicano". It dissolved in 1968 after a split in the party forced it to fold, giving way to Partido Nuevo Progresista.

== Trajectory and demise ==
During the 1967 Puerto Rican status referendum, Miguel A. García Méndez led a boycott of the plebiscite arguing that the results would be non-binding. His position made for a serious division within Partido Estadista Republicano. As a result many members of the top brass of the party left and formed their own pro-statehood party. This new party, led by Luis A. Ferré was named Partido Nuevo Progresista. The split forced the dissolution of Partido Estadista Republicano after the November 1968 elections when it did not register enough votes to maintain its registration as a political party.

== See also ==
- Partido Republicano Puro
