= List of Latin American writers =

This is a list of some of the most important writers from Latin America, organized by cultural region and nationality. The focus is on Latin American literature.

== Andeans ==
=== Bolivia ===
- Alcides Arguedas (1879–1946), historian
- Matilde Casazola
- Javier del Granado (1913–1996), poet
- Alfonso Gumucio Dagron
- Víctor Montoya
- Edmundo Paz Soldán (born 1967), novelist
- Jaime Sáenz (1921–1986), poet and novelist
- José Ignacio de Sanjinés (1786–1864), poet
- Pedro Shimose
- Gastón Suárez (1929–1984), novelist and dramatist
- Franz Tamayo (1878–1956), poet
- Adela Zamudio (1854–1928), poet and novelist

=== Chile ===
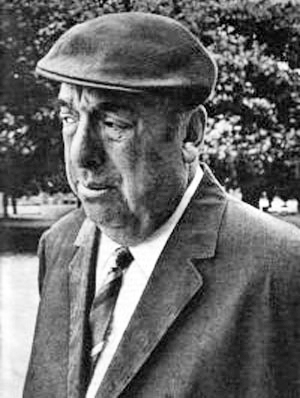
Pablo Neruda

- Fernando Alegria
- Isabel Allende
- Miguel Arteche
- Sergio Badilla Castillo
- Pedro Balmaceda
- Eduardo Barrios
- Alberto Blest Gana
- Roberto Bolaño
- María Luisa Bombal
- Marta Brunet
- Francisco Coloane
- Adolfo Couve
- Eugenio Cruz Vargas
- Pedro Nolasco Cruz Vergara
- José Donoso
- Ariel Dorfman
- Joaquín Edwards Bello
- Jorge Edwards
- Diamela Eltit
- Francisco Antonio Encina
- Alberto Fuguet
- Olga Grau
- Óscar Hahn
- Vicente Huidobro
- Hermógenes Irisarri
- Enrique Lafourcade
- Pedro Lemebel
- Enrique Lihn
- Baldomero Lillo
- Carmen Marai
- Gabriela Mistral
- Pablo Neruda
- Nicanor Parra
- Violeta Parra
- Marcela Paz
- Carlos Pezoa Véliz
- Salvador Reyes
- Gonzalo Rojas
- Manuel Rojas
- Luis Sepúlveda
- Marcela Serrano
- Miguel Serrano
- Víctor Domingo Silva
- Antonio Skármeta
- Mercedes Valdivieso
- Egon Wolff

=== Colombia ===
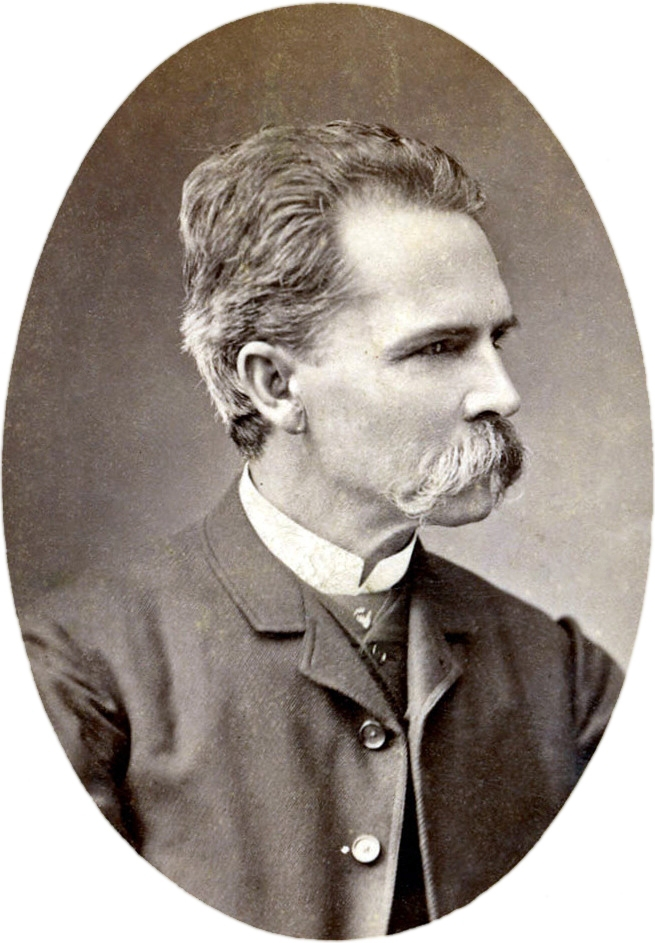
Jorge Isaacs wrote María, one of the most influential 19th-century novels in Spanish

- Héctor Abad Faciolince, writer and journalist
- Manuel Ancízar, writer and journalist
- Gonzalo Arango, poet and novelist
- Helena Araújo
- Porfirio Barba-Jacob
- Andrés Caicedo
- James Cañón
- Tomás Carrasquilla
- Germán Castro Caycedo
- Gabriel García Márquez, Nobel Prize in Literature winner (1982)
- Adolfo León Gómez, poet
- León de Greiff
- Magdalena León de Leal, sociologist and writer
- Jorge Isaacs
- Jaime Manrique, writer and painter
- Santiago Martínez Delgado, writer and painter
- Álvaro Mutis
- Rafael Pombo
- Laura Restrepo González
- José Eustasio Rivera
- Daniel Samper Pizano
- José Asunción Silva
- Guillermo Valencia
- Fernando Vallejo
- José María Vargas Vila

=== Ecuador ===
- Abdón Ubidia (born 1944)
- Adalberto Ortiz (1914–2003), novelist and poet
- Alejandro Carrión (1915–1992), journalist
- Alfredo Pareja Diezcanseco (1908–1993)
- Alicia Yánez Cossío (born 1929)
- Ángel Felicísimo Rojas (1909–2003)
- Arturo Borja (1892–1912)
- Benjamín Carrión (1897–1979)
- Carlos Eduardo Jaramillo Castillo (born 1932)
- César Dávila Andrade (1918–1967)
- Demetrio Aguilera Malta (1909–1981)
- Edna Iturralde (born 1948)
- Efraín Jara Idrovo (1926–2018)
- Enrique Gil Gilbert (1912–1973)
- Ernesto Noboa y Caamaño (1889–1927)
- Eugenio Espejo (1747–1795)
- Euler Granda (1935–2018)
- Fanny Carrión de Fierro, poet, essayist, professor
- Francisco Arízaga Luque (1900–1964)
- Gabriel Cevallos García (1913–2004)
- Galo René Pérez (1923–2008)
- Humberto Fierro (1890–1929)
- Ignacio Lasso (1911–1943)
- Ileana Espinel (1933–2001)
- Iván Carvajal Aguirre (born 1948)
- Iván Oñate (born 1948)
- Joaquín Gallegos Lara (1909–1947)
- Jorge Carrera Andrade (1903–1978)
- Jorge Enrique Adoum (1926–2009)
- Jorge Icaza Coronel (1906–1978), novelist and playwright
- José de la Cuadra (1903–1941)
- José María Egas (1896–1982)
- José Martínez Queirolo (1931–2008)
- José Rumazo González (1904–1995)
- Juan León Mera (1832–1894), poet and novelist
- Juan Montalvo (1832–1889)
- Julio Pazos Barrera (born 1944)
- Karina Galvez (born 1964)
- Luis Aguilar-Monsalve (born 1942)
- Luis Cordero Crespo (1833–1912)
- Luis Costales (1926–2006)
- María Fernanda Espinosa (born 1964)
- Medardo Ángel Silva (1898–1919)
- Miguel Donoso Pareja (1931–2015)
- Miguel Riofrío (1822–1879)
- Nelson Estupiñán Bass (1912–2002)
- Numa Pompilio Llona (1833–1912)
- Osvaldo Hurtado (born 1939)
- Pablo Balarezo Moncayo (1904–1999)
- Pedro Jorge Vera (1914–1999)
- Rafael Díaz Ycaza (1925–2013)
- Raúl Andrade Moscoso (1905–1983)
- Remigio Crespo Toral (1860–1939)
- Rodolfo Pérez Pimentel (born 1939)
- Sergio Román Armendáriz (died 1934)
- Sonia Manzano Vela (born 1947)
- Vicente Cabrera Funes (1944–2014)
- Víctor Manuel Rendón (1859–1940)

=== Peru ===
- Inca Garcilaso de la Vega
- Felipe Guaman Poma de Ayala
- José María Arguedas
- Cesar Vallejo
- Alfredo Bryce
- Manuel González Prada
- Clorinda Matto de Turner
- José Carlos Mariátegui
- Julio Ramón Ribeyro
- Abraham Valdelomar
- José María Eguren
- Mario Vargas Llosa, Nobel Prize in Literature winner (2010)
- Enrique Lopez Albujar
- Ricardo Palma
- Alonso Cueto (born 1954), novelist
- María Emma Mannarelli (born 1954), feminist writer
- Antonio Cisneros (1942–2012), poet and writer
- César Calvo (1926–2009), poet and writer
- Gunter Silva Passuni (born 1977), writer
- Blanca Varela (1852–1909)
- Carlos Yushimito (born 1977), writer
- Renato Cisneros (born 1976)
- Daniel Alarcón (born 1977), novelist
- Mario Bellatin (born 1960)
- Santiago Roncagliolo (born 1975), novelist
- Ciro Alegría (1909–1967)
- Martín Adán (1908–1985), poet
- Enrique Verástegui (1950–2018), poet and writer
- Manuel Scorza (1928–1983)
- Carlos Castaneda (1925–1998), writer
- Gabriela Wiener (born 1975), writer
- Jaime Bayly (born 1965), novelist
- Fernando Iwasaki (born 1961)
- Iván Thays (born 1968)
- Claudia Ulloa (born 1979)

=== Venezuela ===
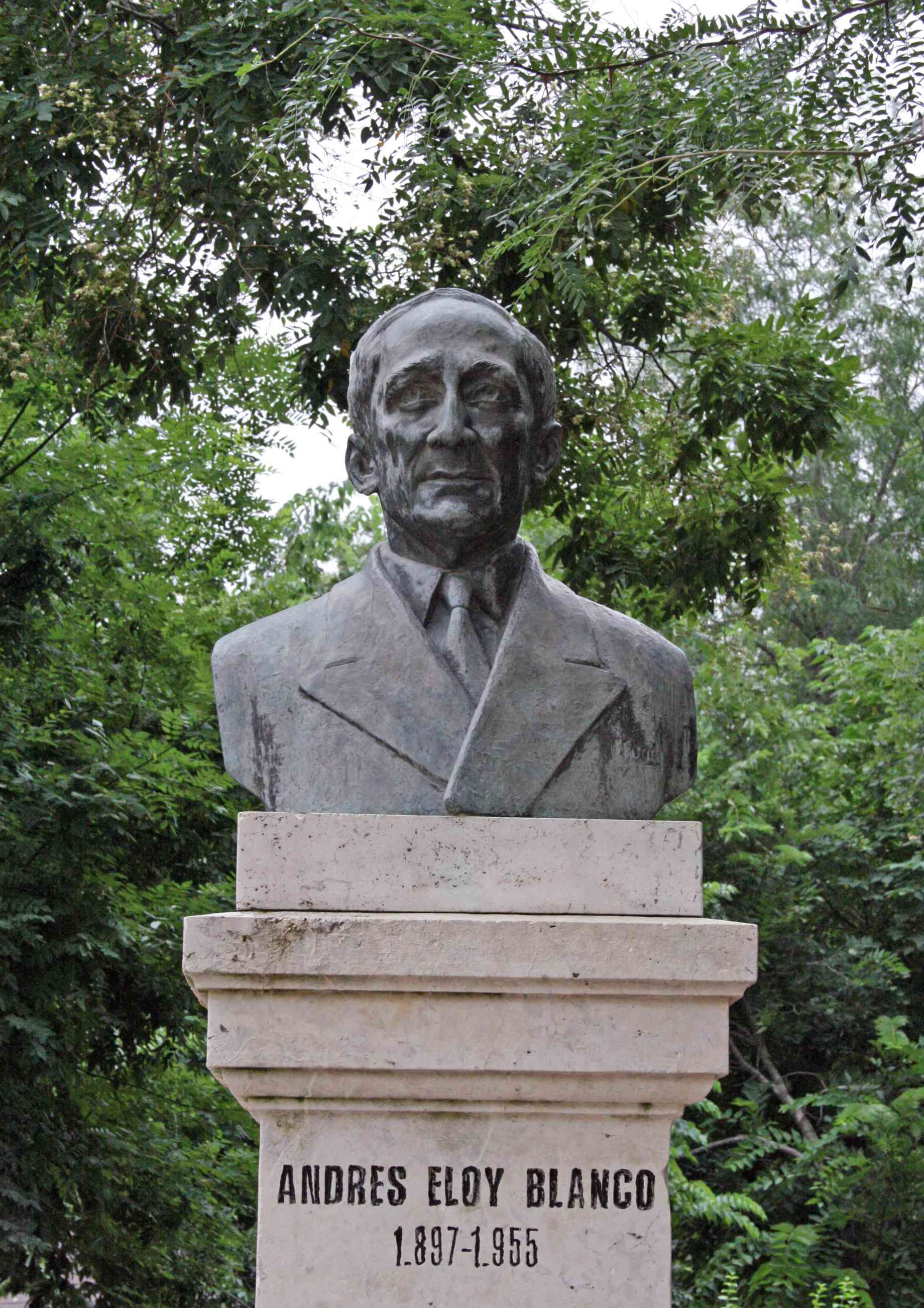
Andrés Eloy Blanco

- Andrés Bello (1781–1865)
- Adriano González León (1931–2008)
- Andrés Eloy Blanco (1897–1955)
- Aquiles Nazoa (1920–1976)
- Arturo Uslar Pietri (1906–2001)
- Boris Izaguirre (born 1965)
- Eduardo Blanco (1840–1903)
- Eduardo Liendo (1941–2025)
- Eugenio Montejo (1938–2008)
- Francisco Herrera Luque (1927–1991)
- Francisco Massiani (1944–2019)
- Fermín Toro (1807–1865)
- Guillermo Meneses (1911–1978)
- Hanni Ossott (1946–2002)
- Juan Antonio Pérez Bonalde (1846–1892)
- Laureano Vallenilla Lanz (1870–1936)
- Manuel Díaz Rodríguez (1871–1927)
- Mariano Picón Salas (1901–1965)
- Miguel Otero Silva (1908–1985)
- Rafael Arráiz Lucca (born 1959)
- Rafael Cadenas (born 1930)
- Rómulo Gallegos (1884–1969)
- Rufino Blanco Fombona (1874–1944)
- Salvador Garmendia (1928–2001)
- Teresa de la Parra (1889–1936)
- José Antonio Ramos Sucre (1890–1930)
- Vicente Gerbasi (1913–1992)
- Alberto Barrera Tyszka (born 1960)

== Brazil ==
- Adalgisa Nery (1905–1980)
- Adélia Prado (born 1935)
- Adolfo Caminha (1867–1897)
- Adonias Filho (1915–1990)
- Afonso Arinos (1868–1916)
- Alberto de Oliveira (1859–1937)
- Alcântara Machado (1901–1935)
- Alfredo d'Escragnolle Taunay (1843–1899)
- Alice Dayrell Caldeira Brant (1880–1970)
- Aluísio de Azevedo (1857–1913)
- Alvarenga Peixoto (1744–1792)
- Álvares de Azevedo (1831–1852)
- Ana Cristina César (1952–1983)
- Ana Maria Machado (born 1941)
- Ana Miranda (born 1951)
- Aníbal Machado (1894–1964)
- Antônio Gonçalves Dias (1823–1864)
- Antônio José da Silva (O Judeu) (1705–1793)
- António Vieira (1608–1697)
- Ariano Suassuna (1927–2014)
- Aristides Fraga Lima (1923–1996?)
- Artur Azevedo (1855–1908)
- Augusto de Campos (born 1931)
- Augusto de Lima (1859–1934)
- Augusto dos Anjos (1884–1914)
- Autran Dourado (1926–2012)
- Basílio da Gama (1741–1795)
- Bernardo Guimarães (1825–1884)
- Camilo Pessanha (1867–1926)
- Carolina Maria de Jesus (1914–1977)
- Carlos Drummond de Andrade (1902–1987)
- Casimiro de Abreu (1839–1860)
- Castro Alves (1847–1862)
- Cassiano Ricardo (1895–1974)
- Cecília Meireles (1901–1964)
- Clarice Lispector (1925–1977)
- Cláudio Manuel da Costa (1729–1789)
- Conceição Evaristo (born 1946)
- Cora Coralina (1889–1985)
- Cruz e Sousa (1861–1898)
- Dias Gomes (1922–1999)
- Érico Veríssimo (1905–1975)
- Euclides da Cunha (1866–1909)
- Fabrício Carpi Nejar (born 1972)
- Ferreira Gullar (1930–2016)
- Gilberto Mendonça Teles (1931–2024)
- Gonçalves de Magalhães (1811–1882)
- Graça Aranha (1868–1931)
- Graciliano Ramos (1892–1953)
- Gregório de Matos (1636–1696)
- Gustavo Dourado (born 1960)
- Haroldo de Campos (1929–2003)
- Henriqueta Lisboa (1901–1985)
- Hilda Hilst (1930–2004)
- João Cabral de Melo Neto (1920–1999)
- João do Rio (1881–1921)
- João Gilberto Noll (1946–2017)
- João Guimarães Rosa (1908–1967)
- João Simões Lopes Neto (1865–1916)
- João Ubaldo Ribeiro (1941–2014)
- Joaquim Manuel de Macedo (1820–1882)
- Joaquim Maria Machado de Assis (1839–1908)
- Jorge Amado (1912–2001)
- José de Alencar (1829–1877)
- José Lins do Rego (1901–1957)
- José Mauro de Vasconcelos (1920–1984)
- Laerte (born 1951)
- Lima Barreto (1881–1922)
- Lúcia Machado de Almeida (1910–2005)
- Lya Luft (1938–2021)
- Lygia Fagundes Telles (1923–2022)
- Manuel Bandeira (1886–1968)
- Manuel de Araújo Porto-alegre (1777–1838)
- Márcio Souza (1946–2024)
- Mário de Andrade (1893–1945)
- Mario Quintana (1906–1994)
- Martins Pena (1815–1848)
- Menotti Del Picchia (1892–1988)
- Milton Hatoum (born 1952)
- Monteiro Lobato (1882–1948)
- Murilo Mendes (1901–1975)
- Narbal Fontes (1902–1960)
- Nélida Piñon (1937–2022)
- Nélson Rodrigues (1912–1980)
- Olavo Bilac (1865–1918)
- Orígenes Lessa (1903–1986)
- Osman Lins (1924–1978)
- Oswald de Andrade (1890–1954)
- Pagu (1910–1962)
- Paulo Coelho (born 1947)
- Paulo Leminski (1944–1989)
- Paulo Lins (born 1958)
- Pedro Bloch (1914–2004)
- Rachel de Queiroz (1910–2003)
- Raul Pompéia (1863–1895)
- Rubem Braga (1913–1990)
- Rubem Fonseca (1925–2020)
- Sérgio Sant'Anna (1941–2020)
- Socorro Acioli (born 1975)
- Sousândrade (1833–1902)
- Tomás Antônio Gonzaga (1744–1819)
- Vladimir Herzog (1930–1975)
- Zélia Gattai (1916–2008)
- Ziraldo Alves Pinto (1932–2024)

== Caribbean ==
=== Cuba ===
- Reinaldo Arenas
- Guillermo Cabrera Infante
- Alejo Carpentier
- Daína Chaviano
- Julián del Casal
- Gertrudis Gómez de Avellaneda
- Nicolás Guillén
- José María Heredia
- José Lezama Lima
- José Martí
- Heberto Padilla
- Virgilio Piñera
- Ena Lucía Portela
- Pedro Pérez Sarduy
- Severo Sarduy
- Pedro Juan Gutiérrez

=== Dominican Republic ===
- Julia Alvarez
- Arambilet
- Juan Bosch
- Manuel del Cabral
- Aída Cartagena Portalatín
- Hilma Contreras
- Junot Díaz
- Carrión Grimes
- Pedro Henríquez Ureña
- Jeannette Miller
- Pedro Mir
- Salomé Ureña
- Geovanny Vicente

=== Puerto Rico ===
- Fray Íñigo Abbad y Lasierra
- Manuel Alonso
- Yolanda Arroyo Pizarro
- Alejandrina Benítez de Gautier
- Giannina Braschi
- Julia de Burgos
- Nemesio Canales
- Cayetano Coll y Toste
- Virgilio Dávila
- Nelson Antonio Denis
- Abelardo Díaz Alfaro
- José de Diego
- Edwin Figueroa
- Rosario Ferré
- Magali García Ramis
- José Gautier Benítez
- José Luis González
- Eugenio María de Hostos
- Enrique Laguerre
- Mercedes Negrón Muñoz a.k.a. "Clara Lair"
- Tato Laviera
- Juan Damián López de Haro
- Luis López Nieves
- René Marqués
- Nemir Matos-Cintrón
- Francisco Matos Paoli
- Olga Nolla
- Luis Palés Matos
- Benito Pastoriza Iyodo
- Pedro Pietri
- Miguel Piñero
- Manuel Ramos Otero
- Lola Rodríguez de Tió
- Luis Rafael Sánchez
- Esmeralda Santiago
- Mayra Santos-Febres
- Alejandro Tapia y Rivera
- Diego de Torres Vargas
- Luz María Umpierre
- Lourdes Vázquez
- Ana Lydia Vega
- Manuel Zeno Gandía

== Central America ==
=== Costa Rica ===
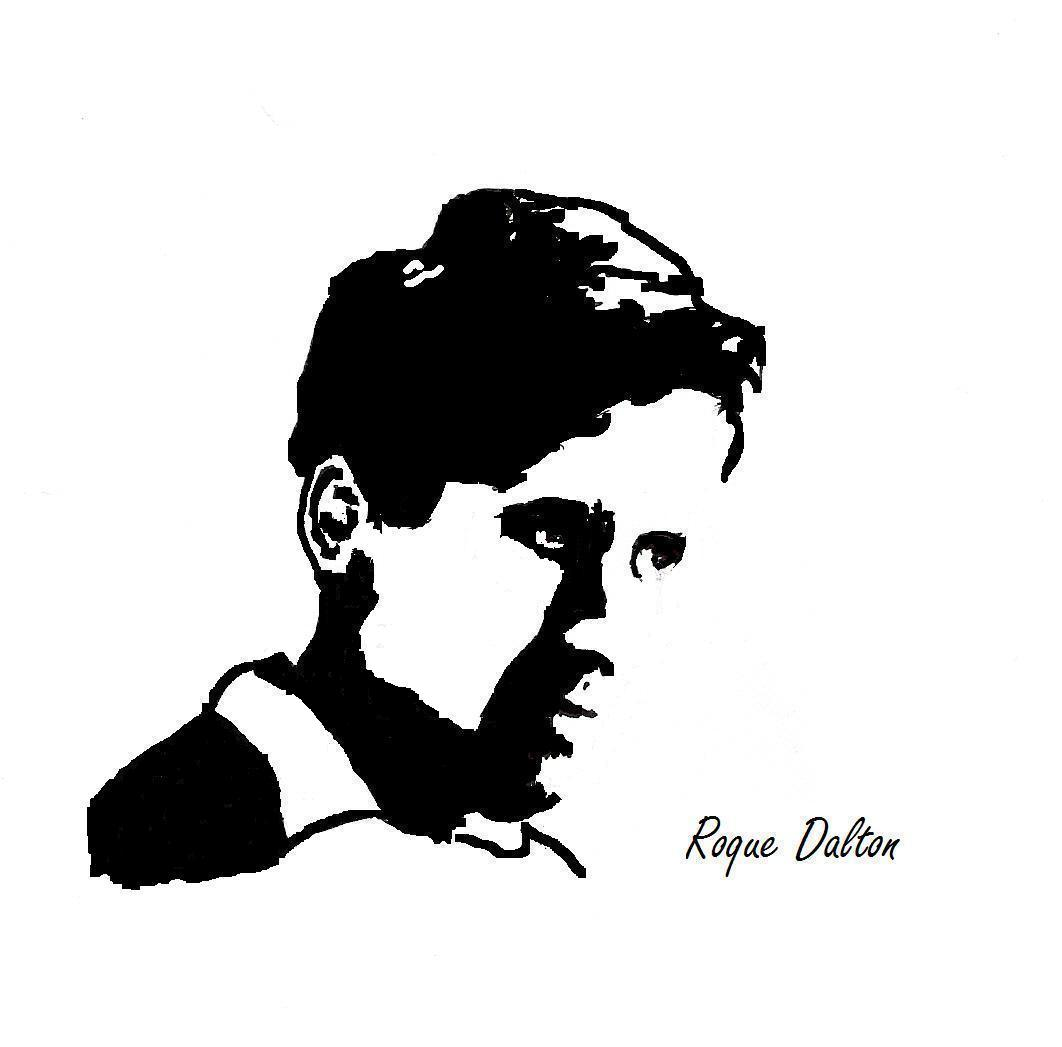
Roque Dalton, El Salvador's best known poet

- Joaquín García Monge
- Carmen Naranjo
- Oscar Núñez Oliva

=== El Salvador ===
- Manlio Argueta, novelist
- Roque Dalton, poet and revolutionary
- Jacinta Escudos, novelist
- Claudia Lars, poet
- Salarrué (Salvador Salazar Arrué), novelist, poet, painter

=== Guatemala ===
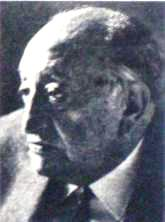
Miguel Angel Asturias, Nobel prize winner

- Miguel Ángel Asturias (1899–1974), Nobel Prize in Literature winner (1967)
- Marco Antonio Flores (1937–2013)
- Augusto Monterroso (1921–2003)

=== Honduras ===
- Óscar Acosta (1933–2014), poet and critic
- Ramón Amaya Amador (1916–1966), novelist and journalist
- Eduardo Bähr (born 1940)
- Augusto Coello (1884–1941)
- Julio Escoto (born 1944)
- Javier Abril Espinoza (born 1967)
- Lucila Gamero de Medina (1873–1964)
- Juan Ramón Molina (1875–1908), poet
- Leticia de Oyuela (1935–2008)
- Roberto Sosa (1930–2011), poet
- Juan Pablo Suazo Euceda (born 1972)
- Froylán Turcios (1874–1943)

=== Nicaragua ===
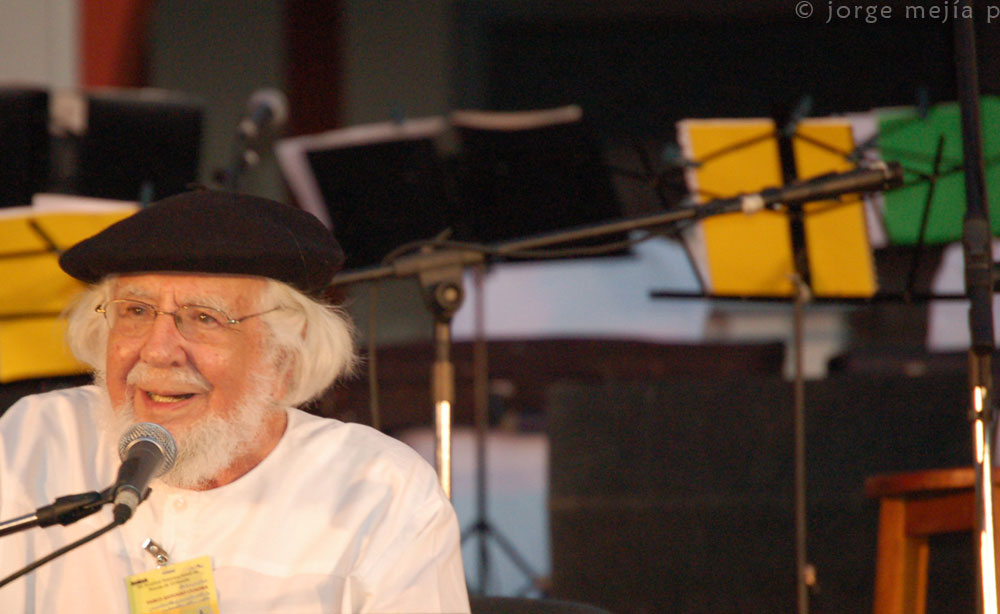
Ernesto Cardenal is a poet, Catholic priest and was one of the most famous liberation theologians of the Sandinista Regime.

Karly Gaitán Morales is a Nicaraguan film historian and writer.

- Claribel Alegría (1924–2018), poet, received the Neustadt International Prize for Literature in 2006
- Emilio Álvarez Lejarza (1884–1969), writer
- Emilio Álvarez Montalván (1919–2014), political writer
- Gioconda Belli (born 1948), poet
- Tomás Borge (1930–2012), writer, poet, and essayist
- Omar Cabezas (born 1950), writer
- Ernesto Cardenal (1925–2020), poet
- Blanca Castellón (born 1958), poet
- José Coronel Urtecho (1906–1994), poet, translator, essayist, critic, narrator, playwright, and historian
- Alfonso Cortés (1893–1969), poet
- Arturo Cruz (born 1954), writer
- Pablo Antonio Cuadra (1912–2002), poet
- Rubén Darío (1867–1916), poet, referred to as the "father of Modernism"
- Karly Gaitán Morales (born 1980), film historian, and writer
- Salomón Ibarra Mayorga (1887–1985), poet and lyricist of "Salve a ti, Nicaragua", the Nicaraguan national anthem
- Erwin Krüger (1915–1973), poet and composer
- Francisco Mayorga (born 1949), writer
- Christianne Meneses Jacobs (born 1971), writer, editor, and publisher
- Rosario Murillo (born 1951), poet
- Azarías H. Pallais (1884–1954), poet
- Joaquín Pasos (1914–1947), poet
- Horacio Peña (born 1946), writer and poet
- Sergio Ramírez (born 1942), writer
- Arlen Siu (died 1972), essayist
- Julio Valle Castillo (born 1952), poet, novelist, essayist, literary critic and art critic
- Daisy Zamora (born 1950), poet

=== Panama ===
- Rosa María Britton, writer
- Gloria Guardia, novelist and essayist
- María Olimpia de Obaldía
- Ricardo Miró, poet
- José Luis Rodríguez Pittí, writer and photographer

== Mexico ==
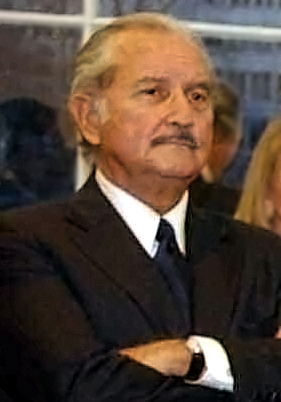
Carlos Fuentes, one of the most internationally popular Mexican writers

- Isabel Fraire (1934–2015)
- Nezahualcóyotl (1402–1472)
- Juan Ruiz de Alarcón (1581–1639)
- Juana Inés de la Cruz (1651–1695)
- José Joaquín Fernández de Lizardi (1776–1827)
- Ignacio Manuel Altamirano (1834–1893)
- José Rosas Moreno (1838–1883)
- Manuel Acuña (1849–1873)
- Salvador Díaz Mirón (1853–1928)
- Manuel Gutiérrez Nájera (1858–1895)
- Amado Nervo (1870–1919)
- Mariano Azuela (1873–1952)
- Alfonso Reyes (1889–1959)
- Bruno Traven (1890–1969)
- Manuel Maples Arce (1898–1981)
- Germán List Arzubide (1898–1998)
- Carlos Pellicer (1899–1977)
- Arqueles Vela (1899–1977)
- Nellie Campobello (1900–1986)
- Antonieta Rivas Mercado (1900–1931)
- Esperanza Zambrano (1901–1992)
- Xavier Villaurrutia (1903–1951)
- Agustín Yáñez (1904–1980)
- Salvador Novo (1904–1974)
- Guadalupe Dueñas (1910–2002)
- Octavio Paz (1914–1998)
- José Revueltas (1914–1976)
- Elena Garro (1917–1998)
- Pita Amor (1918–2000)
- Alí Chumacero (1918–2010)
- Juan José Arreola (1918–2001)
- Juan Rulfo (1918–1986)
- Ricardo Garibay (1923–1999)
- Rosario Castellanos (1925–1974)
- Jaime Sabines (1926–1999)
- Tomás Segovia (1927–2011)
- Jorge Ibargüengoitia (1928–1983)
- Amparo Dávila (1928–2020)
- Carlos Fuentes (1928–2012)
- Margo Glantz (born 1930)
- Salvador Elizondo (1932–2006)
- Elena Poniatowska (born 1932)
- Juan García Ponce (1932–2003)
- Vicente Leñero (1933–2014)
- Sergio Pitol (1933–2018)
- Gabriel Zaid (born 1934)
- Fernando del Paso (1935–2018)
- Carlos Monsiváis (1938–2010)
- José Emilio Pacheco (1939–2014)
- Jesús Gardea (1939–2000)
- Homero Aridjis (born 1940)
- Héctor Aguilar Camín (born 1946)
- Paco Ignacio Taibo II (born 1949)
- Ángeles Mastretta (born 1949)
- Laura Esquivel (born 1950)
- Luis Zapata (1951–2020)
- Carmen Boullosa (born 1954)
- Juan Villoro (born 1956)
- Guillermo Arriaga (born 1958)
- Malva Flores (born 1961)
- Patricia Laurent Kullick (born 1962)
- Elvia Ardalani (born 1963)
- Sandra Cisneros

== Rioplatenses ==
=== Argentina ===
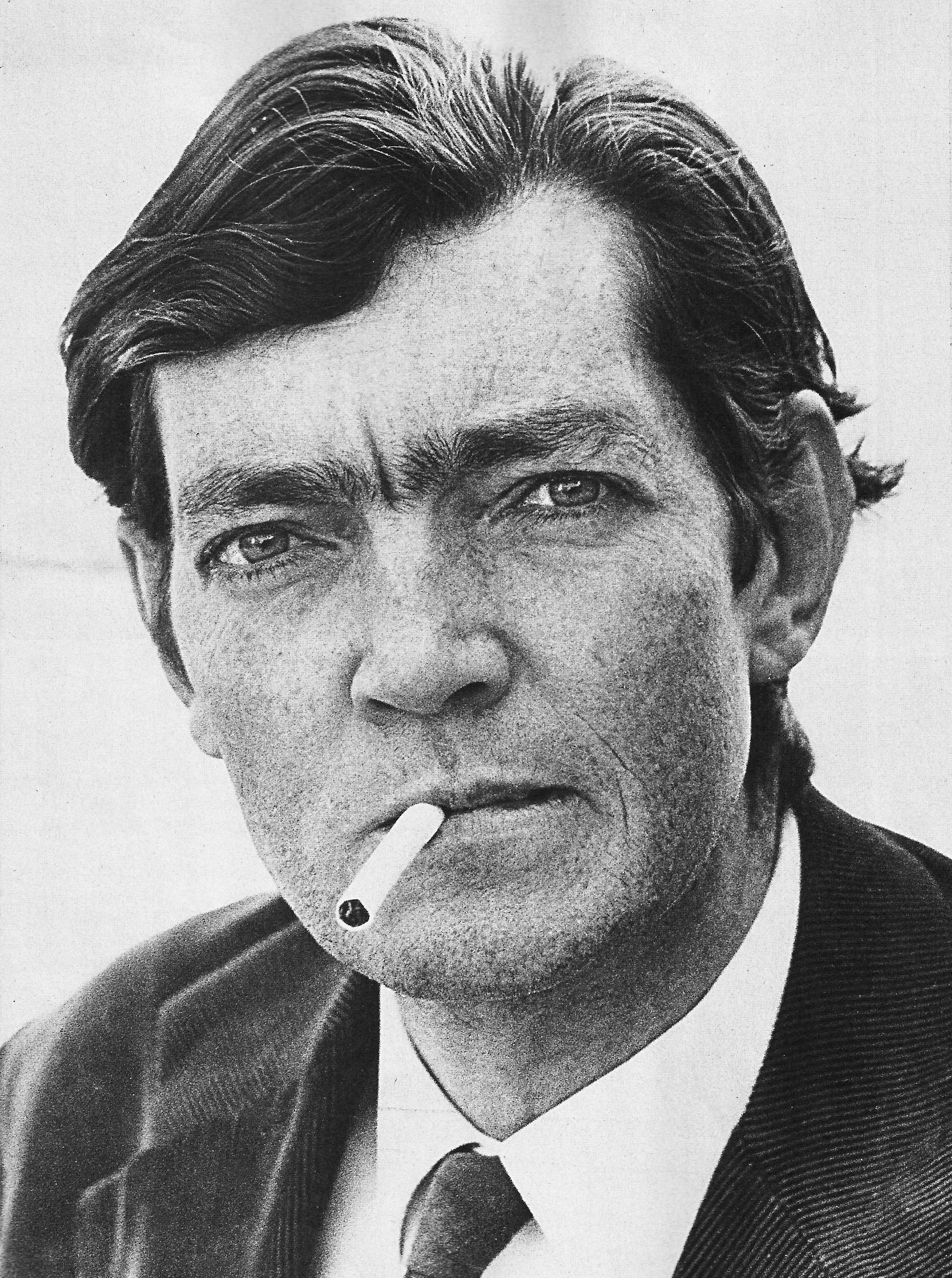
Julio Cortázar, one of the leaders of the Latin American boom

- Juan Filloy
- Marcos Aguinis
- César Aira
- Jorge Luis Borges
- Adolfo Bioy Casares
- Emeterio Cerro
- Julio Cortázar
- Antonio di Benedetto
- Esteban Echeverría
- Macedonio Fernández
- Fogwill
- Juan Gelman
- Oliverio Girondo
- Che Guevara (born in Rosario, Argentina)
- Ricardo Güiraldes
- José Hernández
- Norah Lange
- Leopoldo Lugones
- Leopoldo Marechal
- José Mármol
- Ezequiel Martínez Estrada
- Manuel Mujica Láinez
- Silvina Ocampo
- Victoria Ocampo
- Juan L. Ortiz
- Ricardo Piglia
- Alejandra Pizarnik
- Manuel Puig
- Ricardo Rojas
- Ernesto Sábato
- Juan José Saer
- Domingo Faustino Sarmiento
- Alfonsina Storni
- Luisa Valenzuela
- Rodolfo Walsh

=== Paraguay ===
- Renée Ferrer de Arréllaga (born 1944)
- José Ricardo Mazó (1927–1987)
- Josefina Pla (1909–1999)
- José María Rivarola Matto (1909–1999)
- Augusto Roa Bastos

=== Uruguay ===
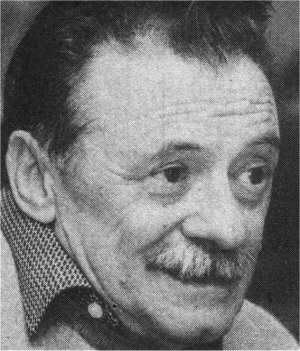
Mario Benedetti, a highly popular Uruguayan author and poet

- Delmira Agustini
- Mario Benedetti
- Matilde Bianchi
- María de Montserrat
- Marosa di Giorgio
- Eduardo Galeano
- Julio Herrera y Reissig
- Jorge Majfud
- Leo Maslíah
- Tomás de Mattos
- Jesús Moraes
- Juan Carlos Onetti
- Emilio Oribe
- Teresa Porzecanski
- Mercedes Rein
- José Enrique Rodó
- Cristina Peri Rossi
- Horacio Quiroga
- Armonía Somers
- Juan Zorrilla de San Martín

== See also ==
- Latin American literature
- List of Spanish-language poets
