= Judge Ramos =

Judge Ramos may refer to:

- Edgardo Ramos (born 1960), judge of the United States District Court for the Southern District of New York
- Jeannette Ramos (1932–2021), judge of the Court of Appeals of Puerto Rico
- Nelva Gonzales Ramos (born 1965), judge of the United States District Court for the Southern District of Texas
- Roberto Sánchez Ramos (fl. 1980s–2020s), judge of the Court of Appeals of Puerto Rico
