= La muñeca menor =

1976 short story by Rosario Ferré

"La muñeca menor" ("The Youngest Doll" in English) is a short story written by Rosario Ferré, published in 1972. The story is told in third person narrative, and is part of a larger group of published work in her book of short stories, Papeles de Pandora, this is one of the most famous of those short stories. Ferré managed to produce this work in both Spanish and English, originally published in Spanish in 1972 in the journal Zona de Carga y descarga; the journal in which the story was initially published was created by Ferré and her cousin Olga Nolla. Before Ferré translated this short story, it was translated by US translator Gregory Rabassa in 1980, yet his translation did not meet Ferré's vision of the work. Ferré worked to retranslate it with her friend, Diana Vélez, this work of theirs was published in 1991. With the multiple translations of this short story, it separated her from other Latin American writers who primarily wrote their work in Spanish. It is considered an important work of Puerto Rican literature and important in Women's studies.

== Plot ==
As a young woman, "la tía" ("the aunt"), would often bathe in the river. One such day, she has an accident while swimming in which she is bitten on the calf by a chágara, a river prawn. A doctor inspects her wound and determines that the chágara has nested inside the calf wound. The wound does not heal and her leg becomes swollen and enlarged, and the doctor continues to provide treatment for her. As the years go by, the aunt, though beautiful and wealthy, is ashamed of her disfigured leg and abandons the prospect of marriage, instead focusing on raising her nine nieces. The nieces and the aunt were very close, so much as she brought them up as if they were her daughters. Whenever the nieces were around the aunt, they would try to lift up her skirt slightly because the wound in which the river prawn was nested gave off a sweet smell. For each of their birthdays, she creates a doll for each one of them, and over the years, perfects the dolls to resemble each niece. When the aunt first started making the dolls they were made of basic materials, eventually leading up to porcelain and finer materials. The glass eyes that were to be put into the doll were always submerged into the river so that they "recognized the slightest stirring of the prawns antennae". The dolls were sized up to the daughters each year so that the heights and measurements were similar. As each niece grows and is sent off to get married, the aunt creates one last doll for each and states, in Spanish: Aquí tienes tu Pascua de la Resurrección, "Here is your Easter Sunday".

As the doctor continues to treat the aunt over the years, he brings his son, who is also studying to become a doctor. His son examines her leg and later, tells his father that her leg could have been cured long ago. However, his father reveals to him that by exploiting the aunt's wealth for his regular visits, he was able to pay for his son's education, telling his son that "I wanted you to see the prawn that has paid for your education these twenty years." The doctor retires, and his son becomes the aunt's new physician, continuing to exploit her condition for his gain. Eventually, the young doctor asks the youngest niece for her hand in marriage, and she accepts. The doll that is made for the youngest niece is made of porcelain, honey, and has diamond "eardrops" for eyes. For the last time, the aunt sends them off saying, "Here is your Easter Sunday."

Once married, the young doctor immediately moves his wife, the youngest niece, to an ugly concrete building, a strong contrast from the luxury she has known. The doll is placed in their new home on top of the piano. The young doctor orders his new wife to sit on the balcony, as evidence for all to see that he married into high society. Over the years the doctor becomes a millionaire, thanks to his wife, for his clients see him just so that they could see the last of the sugarcane aristocracy. After some time, as the youngest niece remains on the balcony, the young doctor decides to sell the doll's diamond eyes. He scrapes them out of the doll's face and buys himself a pocket watch. The doll and the youngest niece close their eyes on that day. One day, the young doctor desires to sell the doll's porcelain skin, and sees that the doll is missing and his wife explains that ants must have found it and eaten it, given that it was filled with honey. Over time, the doctor observes that his wife does not age as he has over the years. One night, he checks on her and sees that her chest does not rise and fall as it would if someone were breathing. Listening into her chest, he can hear the sound of the river within her. The wife (though written as "the doll") opens her eyelids to reveal empty eye-sockets, from which begin to emerge the antennas of angry chágaras.

== Background ==
Many Puerto Rican authors wrote in Spanish as a way to stay connected to their heritage. For Ferré she began to write most of her work, primarily in English from 1995, this is after over two decades of writing most of her work in Spanish. Among other differences of writers during this time, Ferré focused on undermining the "classist, racist and sexist underpinnings" in regard to those who were part of the elite in Puerto Rico, aiming towards the base of feminism and the females sexuality. Countering the ideals which had been embedded into her society of the time was a way in which she showed her feminist outlook on situations. This follows with the journal she created with her cousin Olga Nolla, Zona de carga y descarga, this journal dealt with issues revolving around "identity, marginality, independence, class, ethnicity, feminism, gender and nation" Not only did the journal signify what was going on in Puerto Rico at the time, but the influence the story had on each issue. There is also a given metaphor for the conflicts among classes, specifically between the gentry and businessmen, that was occurring during the time when it was written. With knowledge of what was occurring within Puerto Rico at the time, the work in itself was a fictional reimaging of what could be expected within conflict.

=== Chágara ===
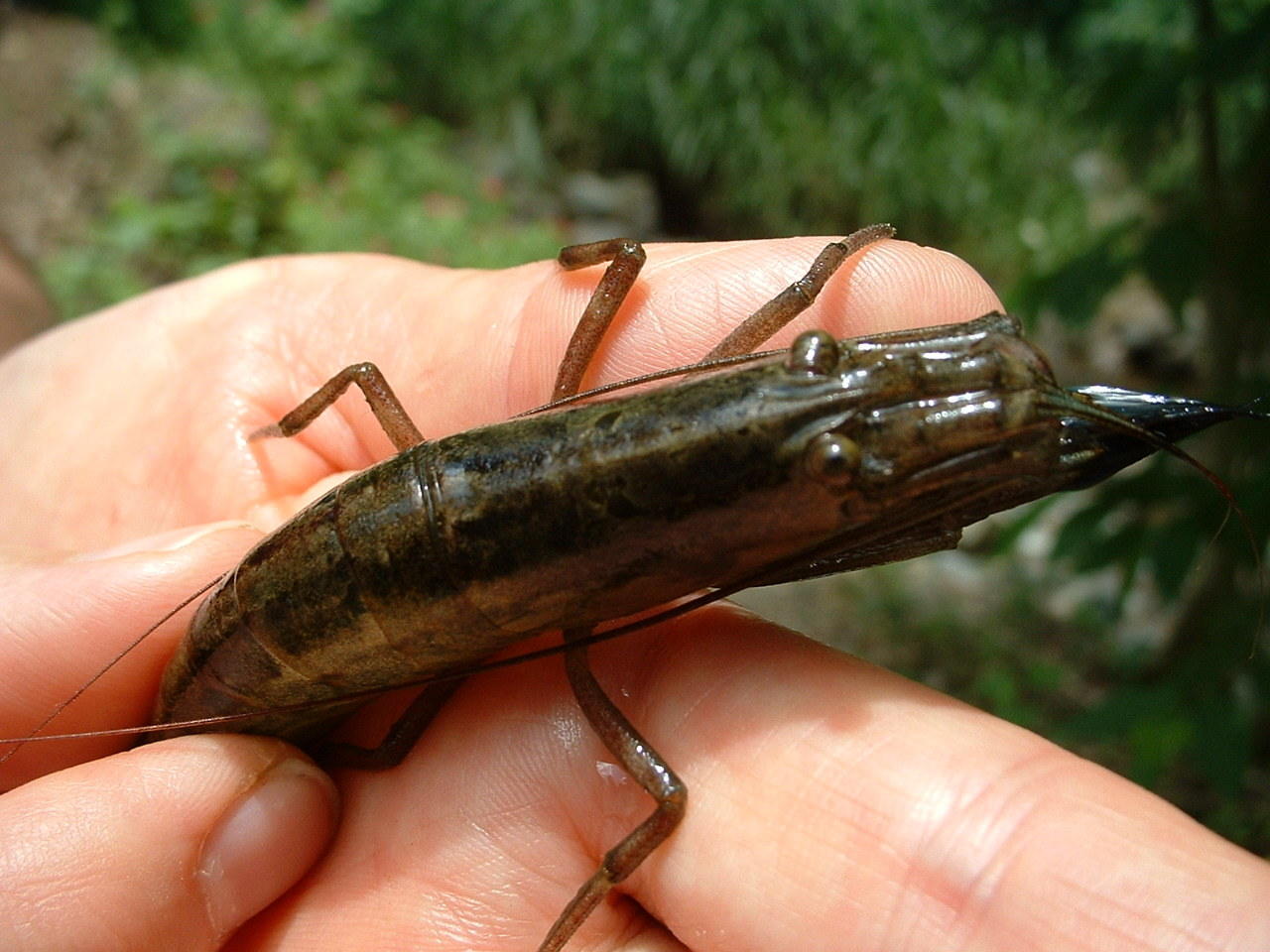
Atya lanipes, a freshwater shrimp (though "chágara" might refer to other crustaceans)

A chágara, found in Puerto Rico and other Caribbean Islands, is a type of edible crustacean: shrimp, prawn or crayfish, fished from rivers and freshwater streams by locals. In the story's many analysis the chágara is called different things, sometimes a river prawn.

=== Feminism ===
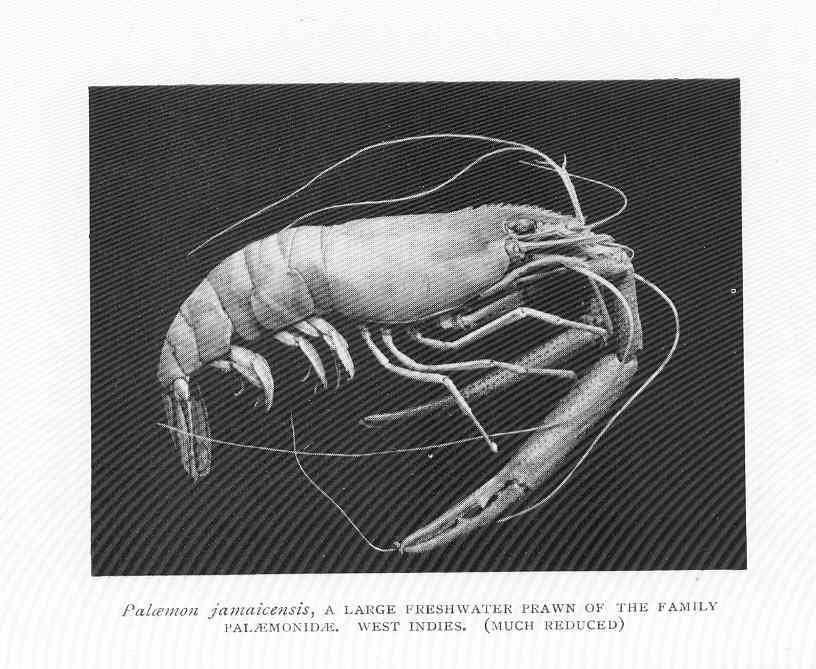
Palaemon Jamaiciensis, Species of fresh water Prawn within West Indies. Possibly within the same family as the Chágara.

Ferré's believes masculine and feminine writing can show similar aspects when it comes to the themes within the story, specifically noting how she perceived the feminine viewpoint as being "subversive and daring". This specific to the ways in which society has come to view dolls as being nothing but innocent, yet within this story they are portrayed differently, this is the result of male writers suppressing women's roles within society. The story in itself changes the way in which the traditional woman may be fetished, it gives the story its own power to counteract how women are objectified within the arts.

== Literary significance and reception ==
The story falls under the genre of magical realism. According to critic Cynthia Sloan, "One of the lucid strategies that Ferré employs to challenge the conventional misrepresentation is to introduce the presence of dolls in the literal, as well as the figurative sense, to show how the doll, being the stereotypical choice of toy for a girl, encapsulates societal expectations of behavior and appearance and therefore limits the scope of possibilities for women by continually reinforcing unrealistic ideals". The text also reflects the weakening of landowners as a result of industrialization.

According to critic Mervin Romá Capeles, the aunt feels humiliated and sacrificed by a powerful man as he pursues his ambitions; a doctor who has so morbidly chosen to not treat her wound, has instead kept her as his permanent patient because of her wealth. When one walks into the room where the aunt and her dolls reside, their room resembles a dovecote, symbolizing freedom lost and the room also looks like a warehouse where tobacco leaves have been left to ripen, symbolizing stagnation. The aunt's wound continues to fester and smells like a ripened guanabana, a fruit. These represent the interior of the aunt, whose growth was stunted from the moment the chágara bore into her leg. The aunt has renounced all her dreams of marriage, and her sexuality has been castrated. The last niece is now subjugated by her husband. The doll, a duplicate of that last niece, the aunt and the niece seem to merge into one, a supernatural being with empty eyes from which crayfish emerge. We can see the similarity through the youngest niece and how she is a representation of the aunt who has been transformed into a separate identity which is the doll.

Two authors, María Negroni and Maria Caballero believe the tale has to do with vengeance. The young doctor who marries the last niece realizes that he has aged but his wife has not. This is after he had flaunted her as a beautiful possession to prove his importance in society. The doll, which he mutilated when he removed its diamond eyes, had been a wedding gift given to his wife by her aunt. Later in the tale, the doll exacts its revenge by "coming to life" and spilling chágaras from her eyes.

== See also ==
- Women Who Run with the Wolves
