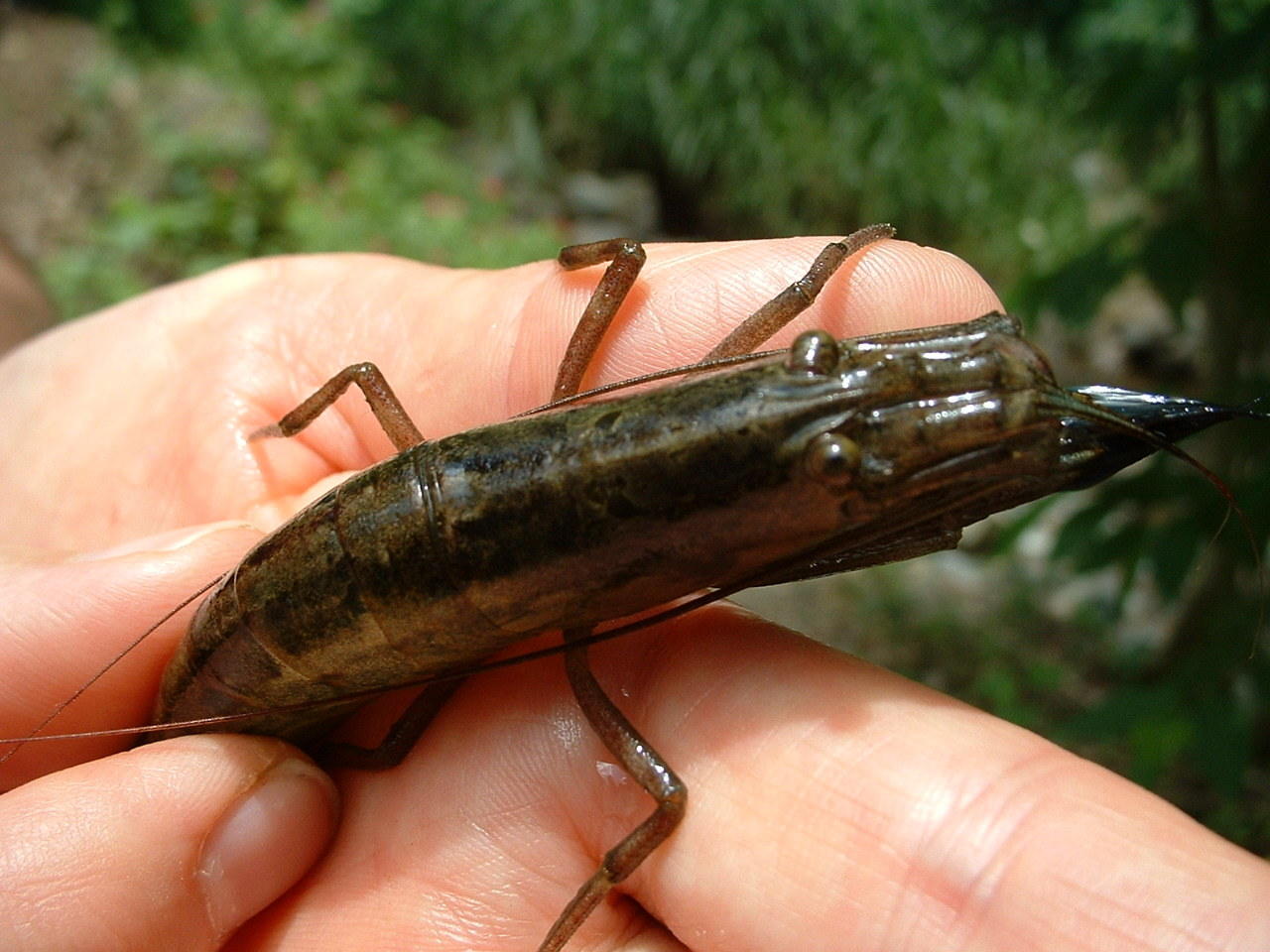

Conservation status
- Least Concern (IUCN 3.1)

Scientific classification
- Kingdom: Animalia
- Phylum: Arthropoda
- Class: Malacostraca
- Order: Decapoda
- Suborder: Pleocyemata
- Infraorder: Caridea
- Family: Atyidae
- Genus: Atya
- Species: A. lanipes

Binomial name
- Atya lanipes Holthuis, 1963

= Atya lanipes =

Species of crustacean

Atya lanipes (Spanish common name: gata) is a freshwater amphidromous shrimp of the Atyidae family in the Decapoda order. It is found widely in the Caribbean and is common in the Toro Negro State Forest in central Puerto Rico. It is also known as jonga and in some places people refer to it as "guábara" or "chágara".

== See also ==
- La muñeca menor
