= Carmen Marai =

Chilean writer

- Born: Carmen María Bassa Rodríguez; San Antonio, Chile
- Occupations: Poet, novelist
- Spouse: Rafael Mercado Aced (1963-1979)
- Children: 1
- Relatives: Jaime Bassa Grimalt (father), Carmen Rodríguez Campillo (mother)

Carmen Marai is the pen name of Carmen María Bassa Rodríguez, a Chilean poet and novelist.

== Writing ==
The central themes in her poems are primarily sorrow, betrayal, a mother's love, the struggle for life, and anti-violence, though she has also written humorous works. Her novels, a blend of historic fact and politics with the supernatural, do not necessarily fall into the category of magical realism in that the fantastical elements are not presented as normal occurrences, but fall upon the realm of the real from identifiably unnatural sources.

Her work will at times intertwine religious and mythical motifs with unconventional interpretations.

In June 2009, after the protests and political flurry of the Iranian elections, Marai vocally supported the newly created Iranian Green Movement, writing her poem "Llamas Verdes" ("Green Flames"). She also played a significant role in the translation into Spanish of Persepolis 2.0, a 2009 online graphic novel created by Iranian-born artists Payment and Sina.

== Early life ==
Bassa was born in the major port of San Antonio, Chile, but spent much of her youth in the capital, Santiago. She is of Catalan and Mallorcan descent, her mother being one of the Winnipeg refugees of the Spanish Civil War. She attended the Primary schools Sara Cruchaga and Las Carmelitas.

She and both her siblings, Jaime and Montserrat, displayed precociousness in languages and the liberal arts, though she was the only one to later pursue a literary career. Her brother later became a commercial engineer and her sister became a lawyer in the Senate of Chile.

== Personal life ==
In the mid-sixties, she married the engineer Rafael Mercado Aced, after which the newly wed couple moved among several small cities of the Norte Chico, later settling in the capital, Santiago.

After the arrival of the Unidad Popular and the unrest of this period, they decided to emigrate with their daughter to the United States, where they lived for several years. The marriage ultimately broke up there and she returned with their child to Chile, where she began her literary pursuits in earnest, joining the Sociedad de Escritores de Chile. She currently resides in Santiago.

== Notable works ==
- El alba de la mandragora. Published 1985 by Isla de Pascua, Santiago, Chile. Written in Spanish. Library of Congress MLCS 86/12372 (P)

== See also ==
Related topics

- Latin American literature
- List of Latin American writers
