= Inés Mendoza =

First Lady of Puerto Rico (1908–1990)

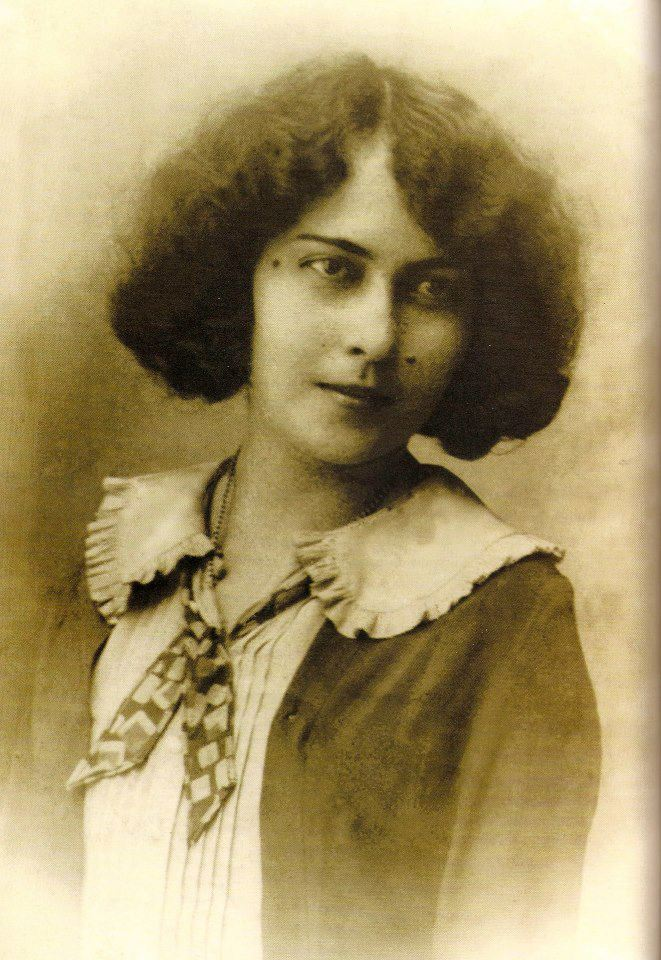

1st First Lady of Puerto Rico
- In role January 2, 1949 – January 2, 1965
- Governor: Luis Muñoz Marín
- Preceded by: Aurelia Bou Ledesm
- Succeeded by: Conchita Dapena

Personal details
- Born: Inés María Mendoza Rivera; January 10, 1908 Naguabo, Puerto Rico
- Died: August 13, 1990 (aged 82) Hato Rey, Puerto Rico
- Resting place: Muñoz Rivera Family Mausoleum in Barranquitas, Puerto Rico
- Party: Popular Democratic Party of Puerto Rico
- Spouse(s): Rafael Palacios (m. 1931 / d. 1935); Luis Muñoz Marín (m. November 16, 1946)
- Children: Carmen Palacios Mendoza; Rafael Palacios Mendoza; Viviana Muñoz Mendoza; Victoria Muñoz Mendoza
- Education: University of Puerto Rico; Teachers College, Columbia University (BS)
- Profession: Educator, Ecologist

Inés María Mendoza Rivera de Muñoz Marín (January 10, 1908 in Naguabo, Puerto Rico – August 13, 1990 in San Juan), was a former First Lady of Puerto Rico, teacher, writer and socialite. She was the second wife of Governor Luis Muñoz Marín. Inés Mendoza stood by the Spanish language, defying the new colonial authorities that wanted to replace it with English.

== Biography ==
Mendoza was an accomplished student in her native Naguabo. She graduated in 1927 Magna Laude from the Normal course at the School of Pedagogy of the University of Puerto Rico and in 1931, she received a Bachelor of Science degree from Teachers College, Columbia University in New York, where she specialized in school supervision. She was married to painter Rafael Palacios from 1931 to 1935 and during this marriage they had two children: Carmen Palacios Mendoza and Rafael Palacios Mendoza. Mendoza was affiliated to the Puerto Rico Nationalist Party early in her life and Isabel Gutiérrez del Arroyo later gave her credit for introducing her to Pedro Albizu Campos.

She returned to Puerto Rico to begin her career as a teacher, writer and newspaper columnist. In 1935, she would meet Muñoz Marín during one of his campaign stops in Naguabo. Although he was married to American writer Muna Lee, Muñoz Marín would move in with her a few years afterwards. They were married on November 16, 1946, a day after his divorce from Muna Lee was finalized. Their marriage produced two daughters, Viviana Muñoz Mendoza and Victoria Muñoz Mendoza.

In 1948, Luis Muñoz Marín was elected Governor of Puerto Rico. Mendoza lived at "La Fortaleza", the Governor's mansion, for sixteen years. As First Lady, she showed interest in Puerto Rico's ecology and public education system. After her husband retired as governor in January 1965, she returned to private life.

Luis Muñoz Marín died on April 30, 1980. Doña Inés, as she was known to close friends and family, died a decade after his death on August 13, 1990 at Auxilio Mutuo Hospital in Hato Rey, Puerto Rico. A few years after her death, Mendoza's daughter, Victoria, attempted an unsuccessful campaign as the candidate for the Popular Democratic Party candidate for the island's governorship. She was defeated by Pedro Rosselló, the candidate for the New Progressive Party. Had she been elected, she would have become the island's first female governor. That honor would later go to Sila María Calderón when she was elected as the island's first female governor in 2001.

The Inés Mendoza high school in Cabo Rojo, Puerto Rico, is named in her honor as well as the junior high school in San Juan's rural barrio of Caimito and an elementary school in Yauco. As a teacher, Inés Mendoza defied the U.S.A. imposition of English and ban on Spanish language in Puerto Rico, teaching in Spanish. Her defiance got such a strong popular support that the imposition of English was abolished, as reminded by former governor of Puerto Rico, Alejandro García Padilla.

== See also ==
- List of Puerto Ricans

Honorary titles
Preceded by Aurelia Bou Ledesma	First Lady of Puerto Rico; 1949–1965	Succeeded by Conchita Dapena
