= Roberto Sánchez Vilella =

Governor of the Commonwealth of Puerto Rico

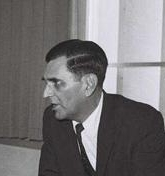
- Sánchez Vilella in 1958

Governor of Puerto Rico
- In office 2 January 1965 – 2 January 1969
- Preceded by: Luis Muñoz Marín
- Succeeded by: Luis A. Ferré

Secretary of State of Puerto Rico
- In office 2 January 1953 – 2 January 1965
- Governor: Luis Muñoz Marín
- Preceded by: Position established
- Succeeded by: Carlos Lastra

Mayor of San Juan
- In office 2 January 1945 – 2 January 1946
- Preceded by: Gonzalo Diago
- Succeeded by: Felisa Rincón de Gautier

Personal details
- Born: 19 February 1913 Mayagüez, Porto Rico (now Puerto Rico)
- Died: 24 March 1997 (aged 84) San Juan, Puerto Rico
- Resting place: Panteón Nacional Román Baldorioty de Castro
- Party: Popular Democratic (before 1968); People's Party (1968–1972)
- Other political affiliations: Democratic
- Spouses: Conchita Dapena (1936–1967); Jeannette Ramos (1967–1997)
- Children: Roberto
- Education: Ohio State University (BS)

Roberto Sánchez Vilella (19 February 1913 – 24 March 1997) was the governor of Puerto Rico from 1965 to 1969. Sánchez Vilella successfully ran for governor in the 1964 elections for the Partido Popular Democrático. He is also the founder of the People's Party (Puerto Rico), "Partido del Pueblo", also known as el Partido del Sol.

== Early years and education ==
Sánchez Vilella was born in Mayagüez, Puerto Rico, to Luis Sánchez Frasqueri and Angela Vilella Vélez and his family moved to Ponce, Puerto Rico when he was five years old. In Ponce he attended elementary and secondary schools, including the Ponce High School. After graduation, he attended Ohio State University where he graduated with a bachelor degree in civil engineering in 1934. As an engineer, in 1941 he was president of the Ponce chapter of the Colegio de Ingenieros y Agrimensores de Puerto Rico, the professional organization covering all engineers and land surveyors in Puerto Rico. He then was a professor for a short time at the University of Puerto Rico.

== Governor ==
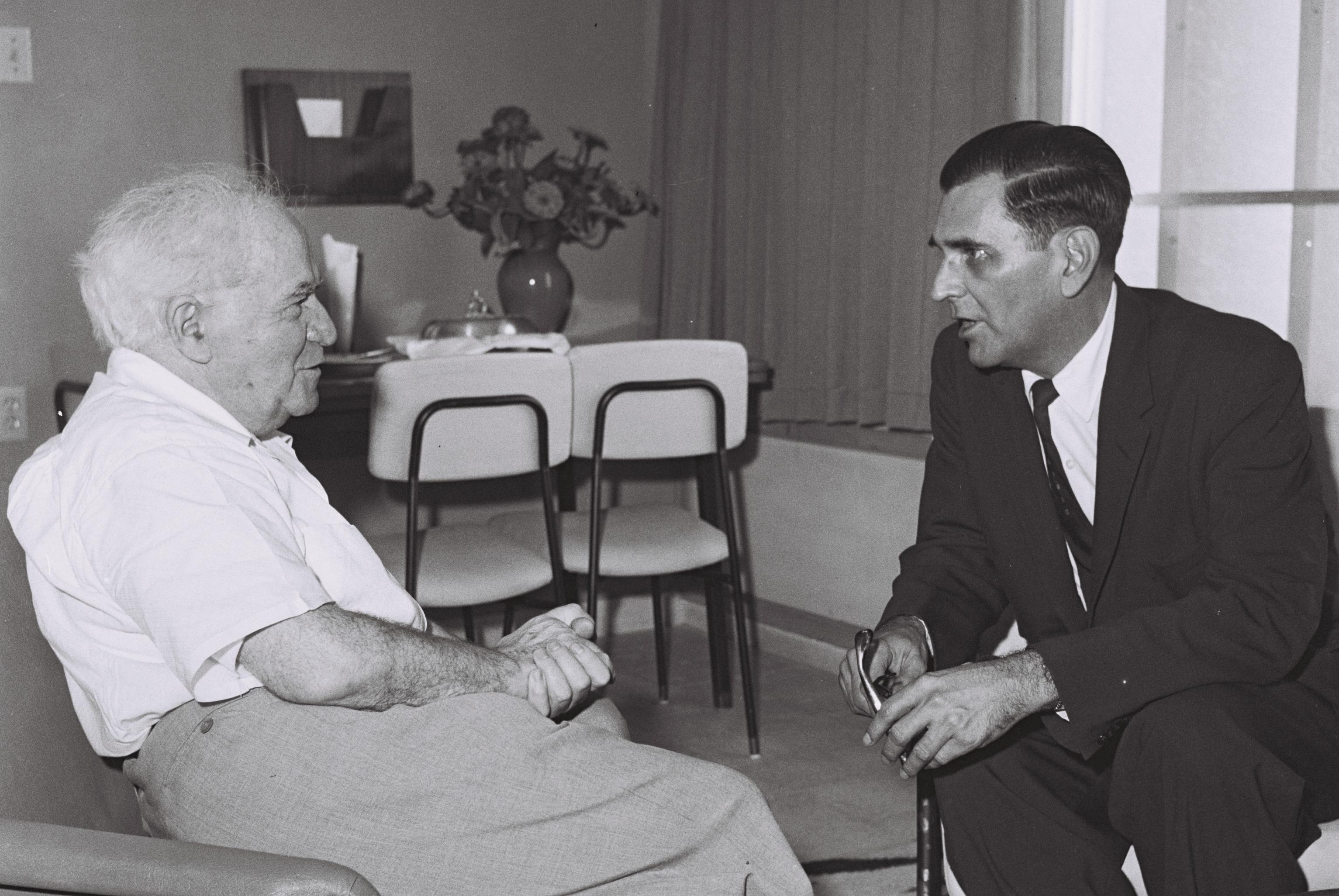
Roberto Sánchez Vilella meeting with David Ben-Gurion during a visit to Israel in 1958

After a long and distinguished career as city manager of the city of San Juan, Secretary of Public Works and as the first Secretary of State, Sánchez Vilella was handpicked by Governor Luis Muñoz Marín to run as the PPD's candidate for governor in 1964. Sánchez won the election by a comfortable margin, becoming the second democratically elected governor of the archipelago and island, and the first to be born in Puerto Rico under American sovereignty.

During his tenure, Sánchez Vilella tried to change his party's membership, urging a younger generation to rise in the friends party's organization. It could be argued that Sánchez Vilella was influenced by the youth movement that the island was experiencing countrywide during the 1960s, a period where many social areas in Puerto Rico, including television, music and sports, were being introduced to fresh, younger personalities.

Sánchez Vilella had public marital problems during his term. In March 1967, his affair with his 35-year-old, twice-divorced former legislative aide, Jeannette Ramos Buonono, became public. Sánchez Vilella and his wife of 31 years, then First Lady Conchita Dapena, separated shortly afterwards when Governor Sánchez Vilella announced his intention to seek a divorce in order to marry Ramos. In October 1967, Governor Sánchez Vilella and Jeannette Ramos married in a civil ceremony held in Humacao, Puerto Rico, just two days after his divorce from Dapena was finalized. This was the governor's second marriage and Ramos' third marriage. His marital problems were brought to center stage during the 1968 gubernatorial campaign, given the still-conservative Puerto Rican moral values of the time, including the stigmatization of divorce. The affair effectively ended Sánchez Vilella's political career and he announced at the time that he would not seek re-election.

His goals of revitalization and change led to a public break with former governor, Luis Muñoz Marín, who was still party leader. Because of this, the PPD nominated Luis Negrón López for governor in the elections of 1968. Sánchez Vilella left the PPD and founded his own party, the Partido del Pueblo (The People's Party). While his new party lost in the 1968 elections, it caused a considerable percentage of PPD voters to vote for him, indirectly helping Luis A. Ferré and his New Progressive Party to win that year. It did not matter that Ferré had made a similar split with his Partido Estadista Republicano (Statehood Republican Party) due to that party's decision not to support the statehood status option in the 1967 Puerto Rican status plebiscite (Ferré created the New Progressive Party of Puerto Rico as a consequence). There is even speculation that United States Navy officials, scorned by Sánchez Vilella as long-time meddlers in Puerto Rican affairs (in a by-now famous episode, Sánchez Vilella had thrashed a hotline telephone that linked the governor's office and the local Navy command) used Navy intelligence resources to prepare a smear campaign against Sánchez Vilella and helped Ferré with logistics and money for his own gubernatorial campaign. Nevertheless, Sánchez Vilella was finally blamed for the first loss in the history of the PPD. His relationship with former governor Muñoz Marín was severely strained, but the two friends mended their differences in the late 1970s.

In 1972, Sánchez Vilella made his third and last run for elective office when he obtained 59,000 votes in his bid to become a representative-at-large, but lost when the Supreme Court of Puerto Rico certified the election of Puerto Rican Independence Party (PIP) candidate Luis Ángel Torres, who polled fewer than 150 votes, based on its interpretation of the Puerto Rico Constitution's rules regarding the election of at-large legislative candidates.

== Retirement and legacy ==
After leaving La Fortaleza and his unsuccessful House bid in 1972, Sánchez Vilella lived a relatively quiet life, serving as a professor at the University of Puerto Rico's School of Public Administration and its law school, and as a radio commentator. The Puerto Rican sculptor Tomás Batista created a bust in his honor, and it is located in the city of Ponce, at the Parque del Tricentenario.

He died on 24 March 1997 and was buried at the Panteón Nacional Román Baldorioty de Castro in Ponce, Puerto Rico which he had claimed as his adoptive city.

The legacy of Sánchez Vilella, who was initially judged rather harshly by historians, has been perceived in a better light recently. His term was overshadowed by the legacy of Muñoz, his predecessor, and the PDP's loss in the 1968 elections is still blamed on him. However, he is perceived by many political commentators to have led the most efficient public administration of all Puerto Rican-born governors, and many long for Sánchez Vilella's frankness and political integrity in light of the deteriorating political climate that has developed after he left office. As the perception of his legacy improves, he is now being honored more frequently. The Government's largest building complex at Minillas, in Santurce, was named after him, and a bust of Sánchez Vilella was placed in the Governor's Hall of the Puerto Rico capitol building in 2007.

Sánchez Vilella had two daughters, Evelyn and Vilma, from his marriage to First Lady Concepción "Conchita" Dapena. He also had two children, Olga Elizabeth and Roberto José, from his marriage to Jeannette Ramos.

== Honors ==
In 1997, Governor Pedro Rosselló signed into law a bill introduced by then senator Kenneth McClintock converting a major highway built by Sánchez Vilella between Ponce and Mayagüez into the "Roberto Sánchez Vilella Expressway", honoring not only his service as Governor but as Secretary of Public Works.

A new Puerto Rican highway, PR-66, named in honor of Roberto Sánchez Vilella was inaugurated on 31 March 2006.

The University of Puerto Rico's School of Public Administration, where he served as a professor, bears his name.

Political offices
New office	Secretary of State of Puerto Rico; 1952–1964	Succeeded by Carlos Lastra
Preceded by Luis Muñoz Marín	Governor of Puerto Rico; 1965–1969	Succeeded by Luis A. Ferré
Party political offices
Preceded by Luis Muñoz Marín	Popular Democratic nominee for Governor of Puerto Rico; 1964	Succeeded by Luis Negrón López
