= Jacob the Mutant =

2002 novella by Mario Bellatin

- Author: Mario Bellatin
- Language: Spanish
- Publisher: Alfaguara
- Publication date: 2002
- Publication place: Mexico
- Media type: Print

Jacob the Mutant is a novella by the Mexican writer Mario Bellatin. The novella takes the form of an exegesis meant to interpret The Border, a lost text by the Austrian novelist Joseph Roth. Organized as a set of fragmentary manuscripts from The Border, the story initially chronicles events in the life of Jacob Pliniak, an Eastern European rabbi and owner of a roadside tavern. As he flees a pogrom and resettles in the United States, reality shifts and so does Jacob. He mutates quite suddenly into a woman, while the novella transforms into another story altogether.

The novella's prose shifts constantly between this "found" material from The Border, a secondhand account of the recovered manuscript of The Border, and exegetic commentary on the text of The Border. Roth did write a text called Die Grenze (The Border). The work appeared in 1919 and belonged to Roth’s journalistic production and has little to do with what Bellatin describes in Jacob the Mutant. Therefore, the novella operates as a work of fictionalized literary historiography.

The first Spanish-language edition was published by Alfaguara in Mexico in 2002. In 2015, an English translation by Jacob Steinberg was published by Phoneme Media.
