= Lorenza Ramírez de Arellano =

First Lady of Puerto Rico

First Lady of Puerto Rico
- In role January 2, 1969 – March 5, 1970
- Governor: Luis A. Ferré
- Preceded by: Jeannette Ramos
- Succeeded by: Rosario Ferré

Personal details
- Born: Lorenza Ramírez de Arellano y Bartoli; July 8, 1902 San Germán, Puerto Rico
- Died: March 5, 1970 (aged 67) San Juan, Puerto Rico
- Resting place: Santa María Magdalena de Pazzis Cemetery
- Spouse: Luis A. Ferré (m. 1931; died 1970)
- Children: Antonio Luis; Rosario (1938–2016)

Isabel Lorenza (Lorencita) Ramírez de Arellano y Bartoli (July 8, 1902 – March 5, 1970) was the first wife of former Governor of Puerto Rico Luis A. Ferré and served as First Lady from 1968 until her death in 1970.

Ramírez de Arellano was born on Esperanza Street in San Germán, Puerto Rico to Alfredo Ramírez de Arellano y Rosell (1880–1961). She had a younger brother, Alfredo Ramírez de Arellano y Bartoli (1915 – 2011), who would go on to establish the first television broadcasting station, WORA-TV, in the western area of Puerto Rico, as well as the first frequency-modulated radio station there, WORA-FM.

In 1931, she met Luis A. Ferré and married a few months later on May 30, 1931. They had two children together: Antonio Luis and Rosario.

When her husband, Ferré, won the 1968 general elections, Ramírez de Arellano assumed the role of First Lady. However, she died on March 5, 1970, one year after Ferré was sworn in.

Honorary titles
Preceded by Jeannette Ramos	First Lady of Puerto Rico; 1969–1970	Succeeded by Rosario Ferré
