= Conchita Dapena =

First Lady of Puerto Rico

2nd First Lady of Puerto Rico
- In role January 2, 1965 – 1967
- Governor: Roberto Sánchez Vilella
- Preceded by: Inés Mendoza
- Succeeded by: Jeannette Ramos

Personal details
- Born: María Concepción Dapena Quiñones; November 8, 1913; Ponce, Puerto Rico
- Died: February 25, 2003 (aged 89); San Juan, Puerto Rico
- Resting place: Santa María Magdalena de Pazzis Cemetery in Old San Juan
- Spouse: Roberto Sánchez Vilella (1936-1967; divorced)
- Children: Evelyn and Vilma

María Concepción "Conchita" Dapena Quiñones (November 8, 1913 – February 25, 2003) was the wife of former Governor of Puerto Rico Roberto Sánchez Vilella and served as First Lady from 1965 until their divorce in 1967.

== Biography ==
Dapena was born in San Juan, Puerto Rico, in 1913. She married Roberto Sánchez Vilella in a Catholic wedding ceremony in Ponce, Puerto Rico, on July 10, 1936.

Dapena became First Lady of Puerto Rico on January 2, 1965, when Sánchez Vilella was inaugurated as Governor of Puerto Rico.

In March 1967, an affair between Governor Roberto Sánchez Vilella and his 35-year old legislative aide, Jeannette Ramos Buonono, became public in a major political scandal. Once the scandal broke, Governor Sánchez Vilella announced that he would seek a divorce from First Lady Conchita Dapena, ending their 31-year marriage, in order to marry Ramos. Just two days after the divorce between Dapena and Sánchez Vilella was finalized, the Governor married Jeannette Ramos in a civil ceremony in October 1967.

Sánchez Vilella's affair and divorce from First Lady Conchita Dapena is credited with ending his political career. He announced that he would not seek a second term as governor.

Dapena died on February 25, 2003, at the age of 90. She was buried at Santa María Magdalena de Pazzis Cemetery in Old San Juan.

== See also ==
- List of Puerto Ricans

Honorary titles
Preceded by Inés Mendoza	First Lady of Puerto Rico; 1965–1967	Succeeded by Jeannette Ramos
