= Rufino Blanco Fombona =

Venezuelan literary historian and man of letters

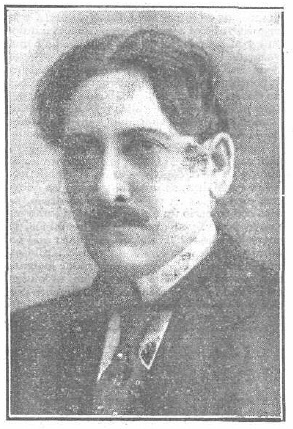
- Photograph by Kaulak (before 1915)
- Born: 17 June 1874; Caracas, Venezuela
- Died: 16 October 1944 (aged 70); Buenos Aires, Argentina

Rufino Blanco Fombona (1874–1944) was a Venezuelan literary historian and man of letters who played a major role in bringing the works of Latin American writers to world attention. He is buried in the National Pantheon of Venezuela. He was nominated for the Nobel Prize in Literature six times.

== Works ==
- 1899: Trovadores y trovas
- 1900: Cuentos de poeta
- 1904: Cuentos americanos
- 1907: El hombre de hierro
- 1911: Cantos de la prisión y del destierro
- 1915: El hombre de oro
- 1917: Grandes escritores de América
- 1921: El conquistador español del siglo XVI
- 1927: La mitra en la mano
- 1931: La bella y la fiera
- 1933: Camino de imperfección

== See also ==
- Political prisoners in Venezuela
