= Efraín Jara Idrovo =

Ecuadorian writer and poet

Efraín Jara Idrovo (Cuenca, 26 February 1926 – Cuenca, 8 April 2018) was an Ecuadorian writer and poet.

Efraín Jara Idrovo was born into a wealthy family. His father, Salvador Jara Bermeo, was a merchant who exported straw hats and his mother, Idrovo Leticia Aguilar, was a professor of Castilian and a poet. It was his mother who taught him poetry early on in his life.

He was awarded Ecuador's National Prize in Literature Premio Eugenio Espejo by the President of Ecuador in 1999.

== Poems ==
Idrovo began writing poetry later than most poets do. He was trained in philosophy, having done a Bachelor of Philosophy degree. He lived for a while in the Galapagos Islands, where he was editor of The Macaw magazine. In his country, he edited the magazine published by the House of Ecuadorian Culture. His first anthology of poems was Inconsolable Charter, published in 1946. Several poetry books followed, including Transit in the Ash (1947), The Absence Trail (1948), Two Poems (1973), and the remarkable and hugely popular Weeping for Pedro Jara (1978). Idrovo was a prolific poet, and brought out many books into the nineties, like From the Superficial to Deep (1992), The Faces of Eros (1997) and The Evidence World (1999).

=== Weeping for Pedro Jara (structures for An Elegy) ===
Tragedy struck Idrovo in 1974, when his younger son died. Idrovo expressed his sorrow in the form of a poem, Weeping for Pedro Jara, which was published in 1978. The English translation of the poem was made by Dr. Cecilia Mafla-Bustamante and published in 1998 in the journal Interdisciplinary Studies in Literature and Environment. The Biographical Dictionary of Ecuador has called it "one of the greatest and most beautiful national poems ever written."

== Works ==
- Carta en soledad inconsolable (1946)
- Tránsito en la ceniza (1947), Rastro de la ausencia (1948)
- Dos poemas (1973)
- Weeping for Pedro Jara (1978)
- El mundo de las evidencias (1980)
- In memoriam (1980)
- Alguien dispone de su muerte (1988)
- De lo superficial a lo profundo (1992)
- Los rostros de Eros (1997)
- El mundo de las evidencias 1945-1998 (1999)
- Lírica ecuatoriana contemporánea (1979)
- Poesía viva del Ecuador (1990)
- La palabra perdurable (1991)
- Poesía Última (2014)
- Grandes Textos Líricos (2015)
- Sollozo Por Pedro Jara/Weeping for Pedro Jara (2018 bilingual collector's edition)
