= Olga Nolla =

Puerto Rican poet, professor and journalist

- Born: September 18, 1938; Río Piedras, Puerto Rico
- Died: July 30, 2001 (aged 62); New York City, New York
- Education: Manhattanville College
- Occupations: Writer; poet; professor; journalist
- Parents: José Antonio Bernabé Nolla Cabrera (father); Olga Ramírez de Arellano (mother)
- Relatives: Rosario Ferré (cousin)

Olga Nolla (September 18, 1938 – July 30, 2001) (full name Olga Nolla Ramírez de Arellano) was a Puerto Rican poet, writer, journalist, and professor.

== Biography ==
=== Early life ===
Olga Nolla was born September 18, 1938, in Río Piedras, Puerto Rico to José Antonio Bernabé Nolla Cabrera, an agronomist, and Olga Ramírez de Arellano, also a poet with several publications. She was member of a prominent Puerto Rican family that participated in politics and the arts. She is related to author Rosario Ferré (cousin) and ex-governor of Puerto Rico Don Luis A. Ferré, her uncle by marriage. Her parents moved to Mayagüez when she was five years old.

=== Education ===
Olga Nolla studied in Colegio La Milagrosa in Mayagüez during her formative years. She enrolled in Manhattanville College together with her cousin, Rosario Ferré. She obtained a Bachelor of Natural Sciences majoring in Biology. She was particularly interested in Genetics, even though her true passion was literature.

While in college, her cousin, Ferré, asked her why she was studying biology when she knew what she truly loved was literature. Olga answered that what she loved more than literature or biology was the truth, and the truth could only be discovered through scientific investigation. Rosario Ferré later writes for the newspaper El Nuevo Día that Olga later realized that literature could be just as effective as science to discover the truth, not the truth of the natural world, but the truth of the human heart. She also writes that for Olga, writing and the discovery of the truth were always intimately involved.

Both she and Ferré graduated in 1960 from Manhattanville College.

=== Marriage and children ===
After finishing college, Olga Nolla returned to Puerto Rico, where she married Carlos Conde and had two children: Carlos José and Olga Isabel. She dedicated this part of her life to raising her children.

=== Literary education and contribution ===
In 1967 Nolla started her Masters in Literature along with her cousin, writer Rosario Ferré at the University of Puerto Rico. She specialized in Hispanic Literature. Nolla and Ferré created and directed a literary magazine in 1972 called Zona de carga y descarga which was in circulation until 1975. The purpose of this magazine was to circulate the literary works of Nolla, Ferré and other writers in the 1970s. During this period she began and completed her first book of poems, De lo familiar.

Nolla divorced her husband Carlos Conde and started to work as a collaborator in Puerto Rican newspapers, El Nuevo Día and Prensa Libre. She also worked for the Government's Consumer Department of Puerto Rico (for one year) writing scripts to educate consumers.

In 1978 she began working at Colegio Universitario Metropolitano (now called Universidad Metropolitana (UMET), a university belonging to the Sistema Universitario Ana G. Méndez. She started as a script writer and long distance teacher of the Center for Televised Studies (now called Long Distance Learning, SEDUE). Nolla was responsible for developing scripts for courses on Occidental Civilizations. She also helped in the production. She later taught Spanish, Art History, and Humanities at the Humanities Department of the UMET, where she worked for 20 years. During this time she wrote the majority of her literary works.

Olga Nolla collaborated in many activities and organizations. She participated in the Federation of Puerto Rican Women and was editor of its magazine Palabra de Mujer (Word of a Woman) from 1976 to 1977. She also belonged to Junta Editorial of Revista Cupey, UMET's magazine, since its beginnings in 1984. She directed the magazine from 1984 to 1997 and also contributed to it by publishing essays and literary criticism. Many writers also contributed to this magazine.

During the 1990s, Olga Nolla wrote and produced a televised course on Puerto Rican narrative for the Ana G. Méndez Foundation. She also participated in many literary courses and was a strong proponent of literature by women, especially in Puerto Rico.

=== Themes and influences ===
Olga Nolla was very involved in the fight for women's civil rights in Puerto Rico. For Olga, women's right to liberty was part of the search for the truth. Due to her beliefs, she was victim of derogatory comments from public personalities in Puerto Rico who believed her literary work to be too dangerous for the youth. Her first novel La Segunda Hija caused much controversy.

Olga Nolla was passionate about history, which is evidenced in her predilection for historical novels such as El Castillo de la Memoria and Rosas de Papel. These two novels were supposed to form part of an unfinished trilogy. Before her death, Nolla began sketching the third novel; the setting of the story would have been mid-twentieth century to present-day Puerto Rico.

=== Death ===
In 2001 Olga Nolla went to New York to visit her children. She died on July 30, 2001, at the age of 63, from a heart attack while she slept. She was buried at Cementerio Mayagüez Memorial in Mayagüez, Puerto Rico Before leaving she told her literary agent and friend of thirteen years, Caridad Sorondo, that if something were to happen to her to make sure that the novel was published. Her last novel, Rosal de papel, was published posthumously about a year after her death. Nolla had also told her friend that she wanted to die while dreaming.

The Metropolitan University (UMET), where she taught for more than twenty years in the Humanities Department, created an online portal for the purpose of gathering information about her. She was posthumously honored as Resident Writer.

Rosario Ferré wrote a poem titled "Rosas de papel", allusive to Nolla's book. The poem, dedicated to Nolla, is part of her book of poems, Fisuras.

== See also ==
- List of Puerto Ricans
- Rosario Ferré, Puerto Rican novelist
- Ana Lydia Vega, Puerto Rican satirist
- Giannina Braschi, Puerto Rican poet and novelist

== Notes ==
- While visiting Puerto Rico, Nicanor Parra, Chilean antipoet, coined the term "olganollano".
- 1999 - Named by "El Nuevo Día" as one of the year's most distinguished women.
- Was the resident writer of the Metropolitan University.

== Works ==
=== Poetry ===
- De lo familiar (1973) ("From the familiar")
- El ojo de la tormenta (1976) ("The eye of the storm")
- El sombrero de plata (1976) ("The silver hat")
- Clave de sol (1977) ("Treble clef")
- Dafne en el mes de marzo (1989) ("Daphne in the month of March")
- Dulce hombre prohibido (1994) ("Sweet forbidden man")
- El caballero del yip Colorado (2000) ("The knight of the red jeep")
- Unicamente mío (2000) ("Only mine")

=== Novels & Short Stories Anthologies ===
- Porque nos queremos tanto (1989) ("Because we love each other so much")
- La segunda hija (1992) ("The second daughter") (Received the Pen Club Award of Puerto Rico)
- El castillo de la memoria (1996) ("Castle of the memory")
- El Manuscrito de Miramar (1998) ("Miramar's Manuscript")
- Rosas de Papel (2002) ("Paper Roses")

=== Other works ===
Olga Nolla published many of her works in newspapers and magazines such as El Mundo, El Nuevo Día, Mairena, Cayey and Claridad. Some of these are:

- Sin Nombre y Caribán

== Awards ==
- Premio Internacional de Poesía Jaime Sabines 2000 for Únicamente mío.
- First place in 1994 in the novel category of the Pen Club de Puerto Rico group for La segunda hija. She entered her poem under the pseudonym Ariatna.
