= Iván Thays =

Peruvian author and television host

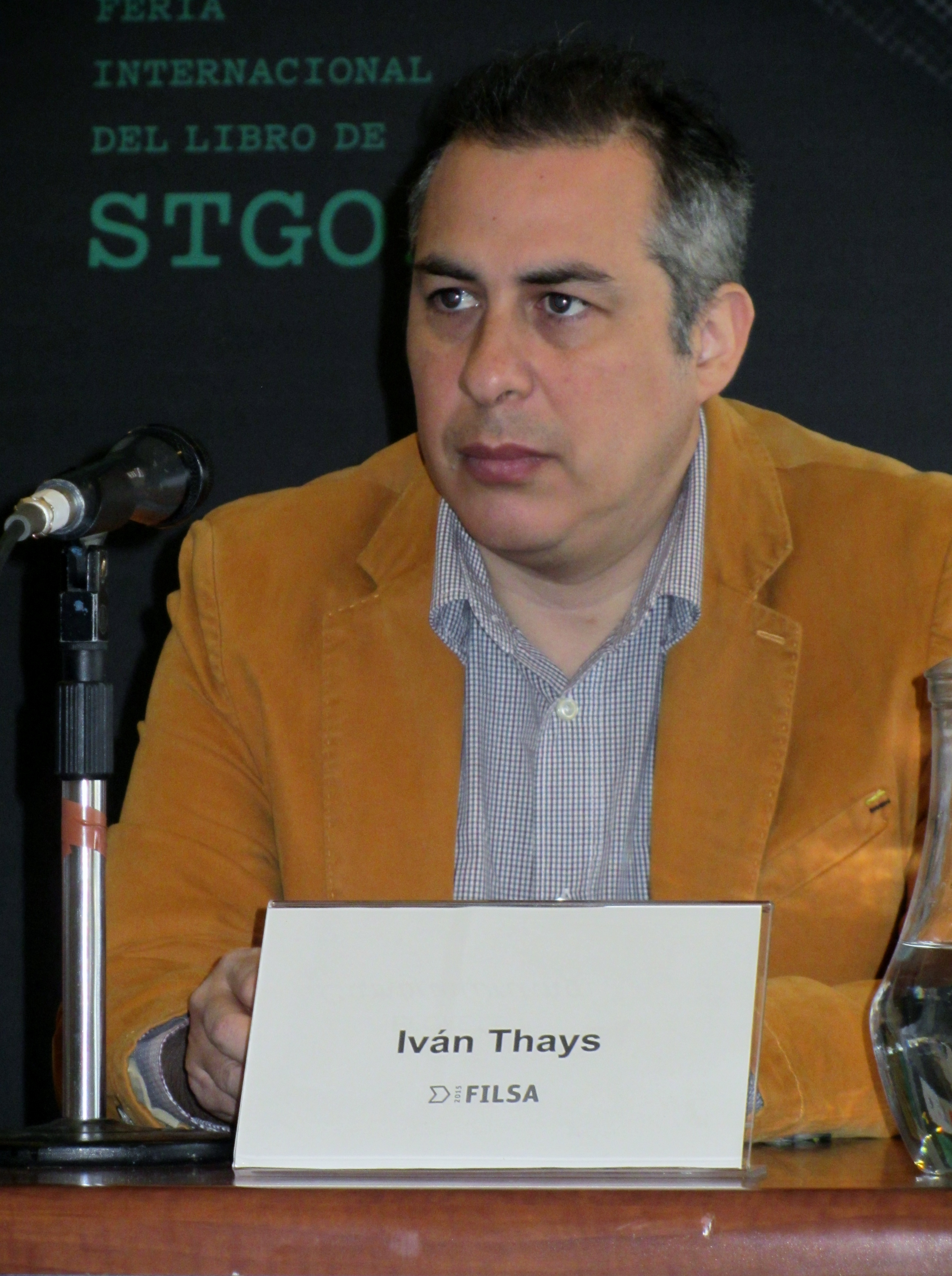
Iván Thays

Iván Thays is a Peruvian author, professor and television host.

== Life ==
Thays was born on October 21, 1968, in Lima. He studied languages and literature at the Pontifical Catholic University of Peru. After his study he continued as a professor at the same university.

In 1992 he published his first book, Las fotografías de Frances Farmer, which received praising critics. More books followed, like El viaje interior, La disciplina de la vanidad, Un lugar llamado Oreja de Perro and more. In 2006 he published the volume Pasajeros Perdurables - Historias de escritores viajeros with his selection of stories of other writers that had lived in exile.

Thays is seen as a renewer in Peruvian literature. Alonso Cueto wrote: "There is a new generation of writers in Peru that wishes to break with the usual form of writing realistic novels. Iván Thays and Mario Bellatin are the masters of this group young writers." He received positive critics of more writers. For instance Mario Vargas Llosa described him as "one of the most interesting writers that arose in Latin America in recent years."

Three times he reached the final at important award elections. In 1998 this was the case at the Premio Copé with his short story "La ópera gris". In 2001 he advanced until the final with his novel La disciplina de la vanidad at the Rómulo Gallegos Prize. Another time was in 2008 with his novel Un lugar llamado Oreja de Perro at the Premio Herralde. In all three cases he did not receive the principal award though. In 2007 he was mentioned as one of the 39 most promising Latin American writers.

In the year of 2000 he began with the presentation of the literary critical television program Vano Oficio on TV Perú. This program was popular among the audience and renewing for Peru. Because of his pioneer role he was honored with a Prince Claus Award from the Netherlands in 2001. He continued the presentation of the program until the last broadcasting in 2008.

In 2005 he started his own literary weblog, called Moleskine Literario. Next to this, he is keeping up other websites as well, like the literary weblog of the Spanish paper El País. In 2012 he posted the article Con la tinta aún húmeda on the weblog of El País with sound criticism on Peruvian cuisine, that he qualified as indigestible and little healthy. His post led to a mounting discussion, with reactions of important persons of Peruvian society, like master cook Gastón Acurio, journalists like Beto Ortiz, politicians and colleague authors.

== Bibliography ==
- 1992: Las fotografías de Frances Farmer, fairy tales
- 1995: Escena de caza, short story
- 1998: "La ópera gris", short story
- 1999: El viaje interior, novel
- 2000: La disciplina de la vanidad, novel
- 2009: Un lugar llamado Oreja de Perro, novel
- 2011: Un sueño fugaz, novel
- 2011: El orden de las cosas, novel

== Literature ==
- Ruz, Robert (2005) Contemporary Peruvian Narrative and Popular Culture: Jaime Bayly, Ivan Thays and Jorge Eduardo Benavides, Coleccion Tamesis: Series A, Monografias, Tamesis Books, ISBN 978-1855661103
