= Matilde Bianchi =

Uruguayan writer

- Born: Maria Matilde Bianchi Prada; 26 May 1927; Montevideo
- Died: 1991
- Occupation: Writer

Maria Matilde Bianchi Prada (26 May 1927 – 1991) was a Uruguayan writer.

== Early life ==
Bianchi was born in Montevideo, the daughter of Bervano Bianchi and Noemí Prada.

She first gained notice at the age of 20 with her short story "La muerte de Gustavo Dávila". Soon after, she went to Salamanca in Spain for higher studies. Her debut collection of poems "Cenit bárbaro" won the Premio de Poesía del Ministerio de Instrucción Pública in 1954.

== Biography ==
She was a Spanish studies professor and worked as a literacy and dance critic. In 1954 she was granted by the Universidad de Salamanca to continue her postgraduate studies.

Due to Che Guevara's death in 1967, she read a poem Cantar del Ché in his memory. In 1973 she travelled to Spain, living in Madrid in 1976 and returning to Uruguay in 1982. Along with other Latin Americans writers funded the "Fabro", a literacy club, and directed the Poetry Workshop of the Institute of Integral Education of Madrid, and wrote for the newspaper El Pueblo.

She was jury of several literary contests and wrote for Spanish magazines as Ínsula, La Pluma, Zikurat y Triunfo

She died from complications from asthma in 1991.

== Works ==
=== Poetry ===
- Cenit bárbaro (1954)
- Cantar del Che (1967)
- Los Tangos de Troilo (1969)
- Adiós a la sopa de cebolla (1971)
- No habrá más pena ni olvido (1979)
- Violetera de playa (1984)
- Déjame caer como una sombra (1985)
- Aquendelmar (1989)
- Razones de amor (1990)

=== Narrative ===
- Marcha y contramarcha (1963)
- Originales y fotocopias (1982)
- A la gran muñeca (1989)

== Awards ==
- Premio de Instrucción Pública (Uruguay) (1954) por Cenit bárbaro
- Mención de la Sociedad Uruguaya de Autores por Marcha y contramarcha
