= Biographical Dictionary of Ecuador =

The Biographical Dictionary of Ecuador (Spanish: Diccionario Biográfico del Ecuador) is a biographical dictionary in 22 volumes written by Rodolfo Pérez Pimentel. The first volume was published in 1987 with later volumes coming out into the 2000s.

== Publisher ==
The University of Guayaquil (Litografía e Imprenta de la Universidad de Guayaquil)
