= Rosario Ferré =

First Lady of Puerto Rico and writer (1938–2016)

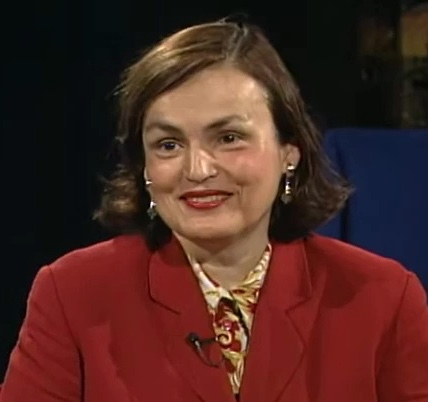
- Ferre on CUNY TV's Charlando con Cervantes, 1995

First Lady of Puerto Rico
- In role March 5, 1970 – January 2, 1973
- Governor: Luis A. Ferré
- Preceded by: Lorenza Ramírez de Arellano
- Succeeded by: Lila Mayoral

Personal details
- Born: Rosario Ferré y Ramírez de Arellano; September 28, 1938 Ponce, Puerto Rico
- Died: February 18, 2016 (aged 77) San Juan, Puerto Rico
- Resting place: Santa María Magdalena de Pazzis Cemetery
- Spouses: Benigno Trigo González; Jorge Aguilar Mora; Agustín Costa Quintana
- Children: 3
- Parents: Luis A. Ferré; Lorenza Ramírez de Arellano
- Relatives: Isolina Ferré (aunt); Olga Nolla (cousin); Maurice A. Ferré (cousin)
- Education: Manhattanville College (BA); University of Maryland, College Park (Ph.D)
- Writing career
- Occupations: Writer; academic
- Notable awards: Ateneo Puertorriqueño; LiBeratur Preis (Germany)
- Website: www.rosarioferre.net

Rosario Ferré Ramírez de Arellano (September 28, 1938 – February 18, 2016) was a Puerto Rican writer, poet, and essayist. Her father, Luis A. Ferré, was the third elected Governor of Puerto Rico and the founding father of the New Progressive Party of Puerto Rico. When her mother, Lorenza Ramírez de Arellano, died in 1970 during her father's term as governor, Rosario fulfilled the duties of First Lady until 1972.

She was the recipient of the "Liberatur Prix" award from the Frankfurt Book Fair for "Kristallzucker", the German translation of "Maldito Amor".

== Early years ==
Rosario Ferré Ramírez de Arellano was born in Ponce, Puerto Rico, into one of Puerto Rico's wealthiest families. Her parents were the former First Family of Puerto Rico Luis A. Ferré (Governor) and Lorenza Ramírez de Arellano She was the niece of the late Sor Isolina Ferré, recipient of the Presidential Medal of Freedom.

Ferré received her primary education at Ponce, Puerto Rico. In 1951, she was sent to Wellesley, Massachusetts and attended Dana Hall School.

Ferré began writing professionally at age 14, publishing articles in Puerto Rico's El Nuevo Día newspaper. In her youth, Ferré was an advocate of independence, despite the fact that her father was pro-statehood (and, later, she too became an advocate of statehood.) Upon graduating from high school she went to the United States where she gained her Bachelor of Arts degree in English and French from Manhattanville College. She was a member of Mu Alpha Phi sorority.

Ferré returned to Puerto Rico where in the 1970s she enrolled in the University of Puerto Rico to study for her master's degree. During her time as a student, Ferré began her writing career as the founder, editor and publisher of the journal "Zona de Carga y Descarga" along with her cousin, Olga Nolla. The Journal was also published along with the poet Luis Cesar Rivera. In “Zona de Carga y Descarga”, Ferré published some of her own poetry along with short stories. The journal was devoted to publishing the works of new writers and to promoting the ideas of the independence movement. The journal ran for 9 issues, the first being published in 1972, and the last being published in 1975. Among the novelists and short story writers of Puerto Rico to share Ferré's commitment to satire were Ana Lydia Vega and Giannina Braschi. Ferré also published poems and wrote a biography of her father. Upon earning her master's degree, Ferré enrolled in the University of Maryland where she graduated with a PhD in Latin American Literature. Her doctoral thesis was titled: "La filiación romántica de los cuentos de Julio Cortázar" (The romantic link between the stories of Julio Cortázar).

== Career ==
Ferré began her literary career writing in Spanish. In 1976, Ferré published her first collection of short stories, "Papeles de Pandora." In 1977, she published a collection of her literary essays entitled "Sitio a Eros", which promoted political and social themes. In 1986, she published her first book, "Maldito Amor", which she self-translated into English as "Sweet Diamond Dust." After publishing "Maldito Amor", she began to write the first versions of her other books in English In 2002, she published a bilingual edition of poems "Language Duel/Duelo del language." In order to write her novel, Memorias de Ponce. Autobiografía de Luis A. Ferré, she transcribed audio left by her father describing his childhood in Ponce, Puerto Rico.

Ferré worked as a Professor at the University of Puerto Rico and was a contributing editor for The San Juan Star, which was once Puerto Rico's English language newspaper. Ferré has also been a visiting professor at Rutgers University and Johns Hopkins University.

== Honors ==
Ferré won the first prize in a short story contest of the Ateneo Puertorriqueño in 1974. In 1992, she was the recipient of the "Liberatur Prix" award from the Frankfurt Book Fair for "Kristallzucker", the German translation of "Maldito Amor". In 1997, she was also awarded an honorary doctorate from Brown University. Ferré was a Guggenheim Fellowship recipient in 2004. She is also recognized at Ponce's Tricentennial Park for her contributions in the field of literature.

== Personal ==
Upon finishing school, Ferré married Benigno Trigo González, a businessman, by whom she has three children: Rosario Lorenza, Benigno, and Luis Alfredo. They divorced ten years later.

While studying at the Department for Hispanic Studies of the University of Puerto Rico, she met her second husband, Jorge Aguilar Mora, a writer and Professor of Mexican literature; they divorced after a few years.

Ferré met her third husband, Agustín Costa Quintana, a Puerto Rican architect, while living in Washington, D.C. They later moved to Puerto Rico, where they resided. Ferré died of natural causes, surrounded by family on February 18, 2016, in her home in San Juan, Puerto Rico.

== Written works ==
Some of Ferré's works are:

=== Fiction ===
- "Flight of the Swan / El Vuelo del Cisne", 2001; Spanish version: "El Vuelo del Cisne", 2002
- "La extraña muerte del Capitancito Candelario", 2002.
- "Eccentric Neighborhoods / Vecindarios excentricos",1998; Spanish version: "Vecindarios excéntricos", 1999
- "The House on the Lagoon", 1995; Spanish version: "La casa de la laguna", 1997
- "La Batalla de Las Vírgenes", 1994
- "The Youngest Doll", 1991 (an English version of "La muñeca menor")
- "Sonatinas. Cuentos de niños", 1991
- "Maldito Amor", 1985; English version: "Sweet Diamond Dust and Other Stories",1989
- "El Medio Pollito", 1981
- "Los Cuentos de Juan Bobo", 1981
- "La muñeca menor", 1976

=== Essays ===
- "Las Puertas del Placer", 2005
- "A la sombra de tu nombre" (The Shadow of Your Name) Published by Alfaguara; 2001
- "Destiny, Language, and Translation; or, Ophelia Adrift in the C & O Canal." In The "Youngest Doll"; By Ferré. Lincoln: U of Nebraska P, 1991. 153–165.
- "El Coloquio de las Perras" Published by Editorial Cultural, 1991
- "Cortázar: El Romántico en su Observatorio"; Puerto Rico; Editorial Cultura, 1991
- "El Arbol y sus Sombras (The tree and its shadows)"; Mexico: Fondo de Cultura Económica, 1990
- "La autenticidad de la mujer en el arte"
- "El Acomodador: una lectura fantastica de Felisberto Hernandez (The Accommodator: a fantastic lecture by Felisberto Hernandez)", 1986
- "Sitio a Eros: Quince ensayos literarios", 1986
- "La cocina de la escritura." In Literatures in Transition: The Many Voices of the Caribbean Area. Ed. Rose S. Minc. Gaithersburg: Hispamérica/Las Américas, 1982. 37–51.
- "Sitio a Eros"; Trece ensayos literarios, 1980

=== Poetry ===
- "Fisuras", 2006
- "Language Duel/Duelo del Lenguaje", 2003
- "Antología Personal"; 1992–1976, 1994
- "Fabulas de la Garza Desangrada", 1982
- "Las dos Venecias"; Poemas y cuentos, 1992

=== Biographies ===
- Memorias de Ponce; Biografía de Don Luis A. Ferré; Published by Editorial Norma, 1992

=== Critical studies of Ferré's work ===
- Acosta Cruz, María I. "Historia, ser e identidad femenina en 'El collar de camándulas' y 'Maldito amor' de Rosario Ferré." Chasqui 22.2 (1993): 23–31.
- Acosta Cruz, María I."Historia y escritura femenina en Olga Nolla, Magali García Ramis, Rosario Ferré y Ana Lydia Vega." Revista Iberoamericana 59 (1993): 265–277.
- Allatson, Paul. "Rosario Ferré's Trans-'American' Fantasy, or Subalternizing the Self," in Latino Dreams: Transcultural Traffic and the U.S. National Imaginary. Amsterdam and New York: Rodopi, 2002, 59–108.
- Alvarado Sierra, Melissa. "La narrativa activista de Rosario Ferré: feminismo e identidad." Madrid: McGraw-Hill Interamericana de España, S.L., 2020.
- Apter-Cragnolino, Aída. “De sitios y asedios: la escritura de Rosario Ferré.” Revista Chilena de Literatura 42 (1993): 25–30.
- Bustos Fernández, María José. “Subversión de la autoridad narrativa en Maldito amor de Rosario Ferré.” Chasqui 23.1 (1994): 22–29.
- Cavallo, Susana. “Llevando la contraria: el contracanto de Rosario Ferré.” Monographic Review-Revista Monográfica 8 (1992): 197–204.
- Filer, Malva E. “Polifonía y contrapunto: la crónica histórica en ‘Maldito amor,’ y The House on the Lagoon.” Revista Hispánica Moderna 49.2 (1996): 318–328.
- Garrigós, Cristina. "Bilingües, biculturales y posmodernas: Rosario Ferré y Giannina Braschi", Insula. Revista de Ciencias y Letras, 2002 JUL-AGO; LVII (667–668).
- Gazarian Gautier. "Rosario Ferré." Interviews with Latin American Writers. Elmwood Park, IL: Dalkey Archive Press, 1989. 81–92.
- Gould Levine, Linda y Gloria Feiman Waldman. "No más máscaras: Un diálogo entre tres escritoras del Caribe: Belkis Cuza Malé – Cuba, Matilde Daviú – Venezuela, Rosario Ferré – Puerto Rico." Literatures in Transition: The Many Voices of the Caribbean Area: A Symposium. Ed. Rose S. Minc. Gathersburg: Hispamérica, 1982. 189–197.
- Heinrich, María Elena. "Entrevista a Rosario Ferré." Prismal/Cabral 7–8 (1982): 98–103.
- Hintz, Suzanne S. Rosario Ferré, A Search for Identity. New York: Peter Lang Publishing, Inc., 1995.
- Jaffe, Janice A. “Translation and Prostitution: Rosario Ferré’s Maldito Amor and Sweet Diamond Dust.” Latin American Literary Review 23.46 (1995): 66–82.
- Mullen, Edward. “Interpreting Puerto Rico’s Cultural Myths: Rosario Ferré and Manuel Ramos Otero." Americas Review 17 (1989): 88–97.
- Pérez Marín, Carmen I. "De la épica a la novela: la recuperación de la voz en Maldito amor de Rosario Ferré.” Letras Femeninas 20.1–2 (1994): 35–43.
- Skinner, Lee. “Pandora’s Log: Charting the Evolving Literary Project of Rosario Ferré.” Revista de Estudios Hispánicos 29 (1995): 461–475.
- Vega Carney, Carmen. “El amor como discurso político en Ana Lydia Vega y Rosario Ferré.” Letras Femeninas 22.1–2 (1991): 77–87.
- Zapata, Miguel Angel. "Rosario Ferré: La poesía de narrar." Inti 26–27 (1987–1988): 133–140.

== See also ==
- List of Puerto Rican writers
- Puerto Rican literature
- Latino/a literature
- Puerto Rican poetry
- Caribbean literature
