= Mercedes Rein =

Uruguayan writer, translator and dramatist

- Born: 19 November 1930; Montevideo, Uruguay
- Died: 31 December 2006 (aged 76); Montevideo, Uruguay
- Education: University of Hamburg
- Occupations: Writer, dramatist, literary critic, teacher
- Awards: Florencio Award (1993)

Mercedes Rein (19 November 1930 – 31 December 2006) was a Uruguayan writer, translator, and dramatist.

== Biography ==
Mercedes Rein was a Professor of Literature in Secondary Education. In 1955 she earned a travel scholarship to the University of Hamburg to study philosophy and letters. She was also an assistant of Hispano-American Literature at the University of the Republic's Faculty of Humanities and Sciences, a position from which she was dismissed by the dictatorship.

In 1956 she became a contributor to the newspaper Marcha, where she intermittently performed literary and theatrical criticism. Rein was one of the members of the jury, along with Juan Carlos Onetti and Jorge Ruffinelli, of the weekly's fateful short story contest, for which Onetti, she, and the author of the story "El guardaespaldas", Nelson Marra, were imprisoned in 1974.

Rein was part of the independent theater movement. Her play El herrero y la muerte, written with Jorge Curi, was on the bill for more than six years at the Teatro Circular. Juana de Asbaje (1993) won her the Florencio Award for the best play of the year.

As a translator (especially of German, as a result of her stay in Germany), she translated texts by Bertolt Brecht (The Caucasian Chalk Circle, The Threepenny Opera, Life of Galileo), Arthur Miller, and Friedrich Dürrenmatt, among others, into Spanish, which she later took to the stage. She also translated Der Kontrabaß by Patrick Süskind into Spanish as El contrabajo.

As a narrator, her disturbing Zoologismos (1967) stands out. With its delirious and obsessive invasion of ghostly presences, it is perhaps the most accomplished of her narrative output. She was also responsible for the lyrics of several songs by Jorge Lazaroff.

As a teacher, in her essay work, in addition to academic works on the German philosopher Ernst Cassirer and the writers Julio Cortázar and Nicanor Parra, there are also some simple manuals of pedagogical design.

Mercedes Rein was a contributor to the weekly Brecha and a member of the Academia Nacional de Letras.

== Works ==
=== Literature ===
- Zoologismos (short stories, Arca, Montevideo, 1967)
- Casa vacía (novel, Arca, Montevideo, 1984)
- Bocas de tormenta (novel, Arca, Montevideo, 1987)
- Blues de los domingos (short stories, Arca, Montevideo, 1990)
- El archivo de Soto (historical novel, Trilce, Montevideo, 1993)
- Marea Negra (novel, Planeta, 1996)
- La máquina de trinar (poetry, Editorial Libros de la Academia, Montevideo, 2007)

=== Theater ===
- La balada de los años cuerdos (children's theater, 1964)
- El herrero y la muerte (with Jorge Curi, 1981)
- Entre gallos y medias noches (with Jorge Curi)
- Juana de Asbaje (1993, Florencio Award for best play of the year)
- Misia Urraca (children's theater)

=== Essays ===
- Ernst Cassirer y la filosofía del lenguaje (FHC, University of the Republic, Montevideo, 1959)
- A propósito de Vallejo y algunas dificultades para conocer la poesía (1966)
- Julio Cortázar, el escritor y sus máscaras (Diaco, 1969)
- Nicanor Parra y la antipoesía (University of the Republic, Montevideo, 1971)
- Cortázar y Carpentier (Editorial Crisis, Buenos Aires, 1974)
- La generación del 98 (Editorial Técnica, Montevideo, 1974)
- Introducción a la poesía de Alberto Machado (Editorial Técnica, 1974)
- Florencio Sánchez, su vida y su obra (Casa del Estudiante, 1975)
