= Roberto Sánchez Ramos =

Puerto Rican lawyer

Secretary of Justice of Puerto Rico
- In office January 2, 2005 – December 31, 2008
- Governor: Aníbal Acevedo Vilá
- Preceded by: William Vazquez Irizarry
- Succeeded by: Antonio Sagardía

Solicitor General of Puerto Rico
- In office 2001–2004
- Governor: Sila María Calderón

Chief Justice for the Puerto Rico Court of Appeals
- Incumbent
- Assumed office 2015
- Appointed by: Alejandro García Padilla

Personal details
- Born: 1967 (age 58–59) San Juan, Puerto Rico
- Education: Massachusetts Institute of Technology (BEng); University of Puerto Rico School of Law (JD); Yale Law School (LLM)

Roberto Sánchez Ramos (born 1967) is a Judge of the Court of Appeals of Puerto Rico and former Attorney General of Puerto Rico, appointed in 2005 by Governor Aníbal Acevedo Vilá. Before becoming Attorney General, Sanchez Ramos served as Solicitor General of Puerto Rico. He is the son of former Governor of Puerto Rico Roberto Sánchez Vilella. His mother, Jeannette Ramos Buonomo, is a retired judge of the Puerto Rico Court of Appeals, and his grandfather was Ernesto Ramos Antonini, who for many years was the Speaker (President) of Puerto Rico's House of Representatives. Also, his aunt was Ivette Ramos Buonomo, a retired professor at University of Puerto Rico's Law School. He was born while his father Roberto Sánchez Vilella was governor of Puerto Rico.

Among his more notable opinions as an appellate judge is a 2016 case in which he overturns a Superior Court decision declaring Puerto Rico's Arms Control Law in violation of the United States Constitution's Second Amendment.

== Career and education ==
He received his juris doctor from the University of Puerto Rico School of Law in 1993 and then completed a master's degree in law from Yale Law School in 1998. He received his bachelor's degree in Computer Science and Engineering from the Massachusetts Institute of Technology in 1989. Sanchez Ramos clerked for Justice Federico Hernández Denton of the Supreme Court of Puerto Rico and for Federal Appellate Judge A. Wallace Tashima of the United States Court of Appeals for the Ninth Circuit. He also worked as an attorney in the Civil Division of the U.S. Department of Justice in Washington, D.C. from 1999 til 2000. Returned to Puerto Rico to serve as solicitor general, representing the commonwealth in all civil and criminal appellate proceedings before the courts of the United States and Puerto Rico.

He was Secretary of Justice of Puerto Rico between January 2005 and December 2008. Previously, he had joined the Puerto Rico Department of Justice in January 2001 as Attorney General, a position he held until December 2001.

Judge Roberto J. Sánchez Ramos has served as the Chief Justice of the Court of Appeals since January 2020, following his appointment by the Chief Justice of the Supreme Court of Puerto Rico, Hon. Maite Oronoz Rodríguez. He was appointed as an Appeals Judge by the Governor of Puerto Rico, Hon. Alejandro García Padilla, and assumed that position in March 2015.

== Education ==
- LL.M., Yale Law School, 1998
- J.D., University of Puerto Rico Law School, 1993
- B.S., Massachusetts Institute of Technology, 1989
