= Jeannette Ramos =

First Lady of Puerto Rico (1932–2021)

First Lady of Puerto Rico
- In role October 1967 – January 2, 1969
- Governor: Roberto Sánchez Vilella
- Preceded by: Conchita Dapena
- Succeeded by: Lorenza Ramírez de Arellano

Judge of the Puerto Rico Court of Appeals
- In office 1985–2000
- Appointed by: Rafael Hernández Colón

Personal details
- Born: July 3, 1932 Ponce, Puerto Rico
- Died: November 24, 2021 (aged 89) San Juan, Puerto Rico
- Spouse(s): Wouter Bordewijk; Harold Toro Toro (1964–1966); Roberto Sánchez Vilella (1967–1997); José Rivera
- Children: 4, including Roberto José
- Parent: Ernesto Ramos Antonini
- Education: University of Puerto Rico School of Law (J.D.)
- Profession: Judge

Jeannette Ramos Buonomo (July 3, 1932 – November 24, 2021) was a Puerto Rican judge and First Lady of Puerto Rico from her marriage to Governor Roberto Sánchez Vilella in 1967 until 1969. She was the second wife of former Governor Sánchez Vilella.

== Early years and marriage ==
Jeannette Ramos was born in Ponce, Puerto Rico, to politician Ernesto Ramos Antonini and educator Josefina Buonomo. Her later childhood was spent in the Floral Park neighborhood of Hato Rey, Puerto Rico. During her childhood, she said that she was a victim of racism from friends and neighbors.

When she was young, she traveled with her family to Europe, including England and the Netherlands. During a visit to a nightclub, she met a Dutch man named Wouter Bordewijk. They fell in love and married when she was 18 years old. They lived in the Netherlands for eight years, and had two children together: Wouter Ernesto and Robert Paul.

== Return to Puerto Rico ==
Ramos and Bordewijk divorced, and she decided to return to Puerto Rico. While here, she started studying law, despite the opposition of her parents. She studied at the University of Puerto Rico School of Law, where she met Harold Toro, a fellow law student. They married in 1964, but divorced two years later. During this time, she also started working as a Special Aide to the Governor Roberto Sánchez Vilella.

== First Lady of Puerto Rico ==
In March 1967, news of an affair between Governor Roberto Sánchez Vilella and Jeannette Ramos, his former legislative aide, became public. Once the scandal broke, Governor Sánchez, who initially denied the allegations, announced that he would seek a divorce from his wife of 31 years, First Lady Conchita Dapena, in order to marry Ramos. The affair effectively ended Sánchez's political career, as he also announced that he would not seek re-election. The difference in age - Governor Sánchez was 55-years old, while Ramos, who was twice divorced, was 35-years old at the time - also stunned Puerto Ricans.

Roberto Sánchez Vilella and Jeannette Ramos married in a civil ceremony in Humacao in October 1967, just two days after his divorce from Conchita Dapena was finalized. After their marriage, Ramos assumed the role of First Lady of Puerto Rico until the end of Sánchez's term in 1969. Ramos and Sánchez had two children: Roberto José and Olga Elizabeth. They divorced in 1997, after 28 years of marriage and a two-year separation.

== Professional career ==
After their time in La Fortaleza, Ramos started her own professional career in law. She presided over the Commission for the Judicial Branch Restructuring, which originated the Appeals Court itself. She then worked as an appeals judge in the Puerto Rico Court of Appeals from 1985 to 2000.

When Sánchez Vilella died in 1997, she married the following year to José Rivera, a doctor from Ponce. They later divorced. In 2011, Ramos released a book called Intima, where she shares details of her life.

== Later years and death ==
She went on to write a book. She died on the morning of November 24, 2021 after a long battle with cancer.

Honorary titles
Preceded by Conchita Dapena	First Lady of Puerto Rico; 1967–1969	Succeeded by Lorenza Ramírez de Arellano
