= Mario Bellatin =

Mexican novelist

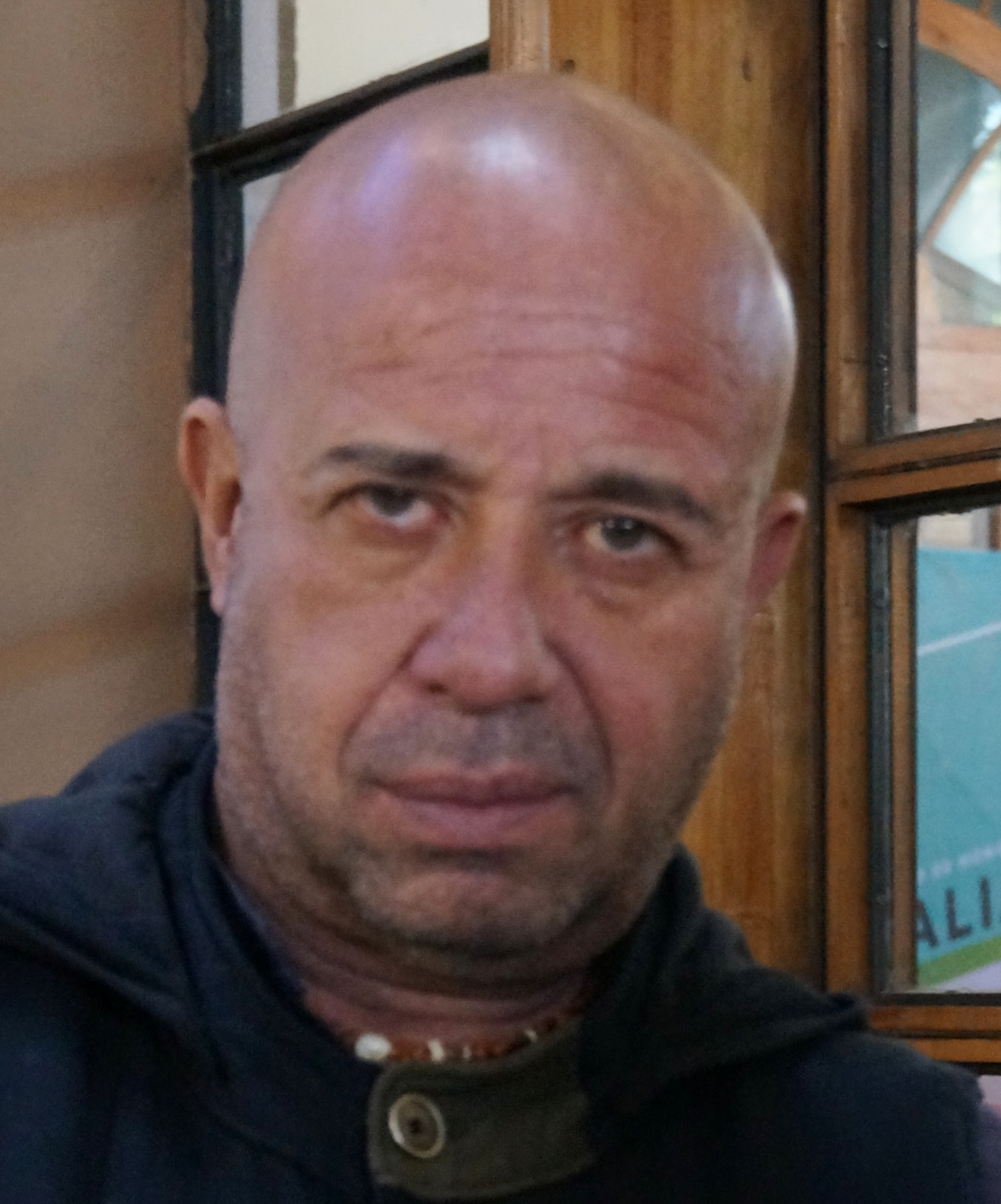
- Bellatin in 2017
- Born: Mexico City, Mexico
- Education: University of Lima

Mario Bellatin (born July 23, 1960, Mexico City, Mexico) is a Mexican novelist.

== Early life ==
Mario Bellatin was born in Mexico City to Peruvian parents. Soon after Mario was born, his parents returned to Lima. He spent two years studying theology at the seminary Santo Toribio de Mogrovejo and graduated from the University of Lima. In 1987, Bellatin moved to Cuba, where he studied screenplay writing at the International Film School Latinoamericana. On his return to Mexico in 1995, he became the director of the area of Literature and Humanities at the University of the Cloister of Sor Juana and became a member of the National System of Creators of Art from 1999 to 2005. He is currently the director of the Dynamic School of Writers in Mexico City.

== Career ==
Mario Bellatin is celebrated as a leading voice in Spanish fiction for his experimental and fragmented writing, which artfully intertwines reality and creation. As of 2015, he had published more than thirty books, and his work had been translated into over a dozen languages. However, while he has participated in writing workshops around the United States, his work is underrepresented in the English-speaking world.

As a result of a birth defect that left him missing much of his right arm, a good portion of his fiction concerns characters that are deformed or diseased or with an uncertain sexual identity.

Bellatin was quoted in The New York Times as saying, "To me literature is a game, a search for ways to break through borders. But in my work the rules of the game are always obvious, the guts are exposed, and you can see what is being cooked up."

== Awards and recognition ==
Bellatin is seen as a renewer in Peruvian literature. Alonso Cueto wrote of him: "There is a new generation of writers in Peru that wishes to break with the usual form of writing realistic novels. Iván Thays and Mario Bellatin are the masters of this group of young writers." He has received positive reviews from other writers. For instance Mario Vargas Llosa described him as "one of the most interesting writers that have arisen in Latin America in recent years."

- Premio Xavier Villaurrutia for his novel Flores, 2000
- Guggenheim Fellowship, Latin American and Caribbean Fellow, 2002
- Premio Nacional de Literatura for El gran vidrio (The Large Glass), Instituto Municipal de Cultura, Turismo y Arte de Mazatlán, 2008
- Stonewall Book Award-Barbara Gittings Literature Award Honor for Beauty Salon, American Library Association, 2010
- Doctor Honoris Causa, 17, Institute of Critical Studies, 2019.

== Selected works ==
- Flores (Anagrama, 2004)
- The Great Glass (Anagrama, 2007)
- Chinese Checkers, trans. Cooper Renner (Ravenna Press, 2007) ISBN 978-0-9776162-9-9
- beauty parlor, trans. Ratheesh (DC Books, 2011) ISBN 9788126429738
- Beauty Salon, trans. Kurt Hollander (City Lights Publishers, 2009) ISBN 978-0-87286-473-3
- Shiki Nagaoka: A Nose for Fiction, trans. David Shook (Phoneme Media, 2013) ISBN 978-1-939419-02-6
- Jacob the Mutant, trans. Jacob Steinberg (Phoneme Media, 2015) ISBN 978-1939419101
- The Uruguayan Book of the Dead, trans. David Shook (Phoneme Media, 2019) ISBN 978-1944700119

== See also ==
- Mexican people of Italian descent
