= José María Rivarola Matto =

- Born: José María Rivarola Matto; 18 December 1917; Asunción, Paraguay
- Died: 13 September 1998 (aged 80); Asunción, Paraguay
- Known for: Writer, journalist
- Notable work: "Follaje en los ojos" "Mi pariente el cocotero" "El fin de Chipí González" "La encrucijada del Espíritu Santo"

Jose Maria Rivarola Matto (1917–1998) was a writer born in Asunción, Paraguay, 18 December 1917, son of Octaviano Rivarola Bogarín and Victoriana Matto. Dramatist, narrator, essayist and journalist, he was an occasional collaborator of diverse Paraguayan magazines and journals.

== Childhood and youth ==
He spent his childhood at the San José High School of Asunción during the time of lessons, and spent in his parents' country houses and manufactures located in Rosario, San Pedro Department, during the holidays.

The house of the Rivarola Matto family was located at the Wilson Street (Eligio Ayala Street nowadays) near Antequera, in front of the San Roque's Church square. He used to go there when he sneaked out from the barracks so he could sleep comfortably and then subtly get in again at the morning. Because of that prank he was sent at his 16 years old to the Chaco during the war against Bolivia as a private.

He survived the war after a year of dysentery and malaria, curing himself by chewing leaves of cocaine introduced by the Bolivian prisoners. His writing skills ensured his survival. His comrades tried not expose too much of him who wrote passionate love letters for them to their girlfriends.

He studied law and obtained the title of lawyer, but never exercised that profession.

He was exiled to the Argentina during the civil war between 1946 and 1947. In Posadas he acquired a ship that he used to carry packages up the river to the now inexistent Salto del Guairá, and traveled back in boats to Rosario. Being in Posadas, in 1950, he writes "Follaje en los ojos", a novel about the confined of Alto Paraná. This novel was published in 1952 at Buenos Aires, Argentina.

He returned to Asunción in 1950, during the dictatorship, and was arrested countless times for freely exposing his ideas in every journal that wanted to publish them. He was also distributor of the Argentine journal Clarín in Asunción, a journal providing objective information about the local political situation.

== Career ==
A figure of our literature, he was also notable in philosophy. He was a dramatist, narrator, essayist and journalist.

He began as a playwright in 1952 with the play "El Sectario" about the aberration of the faith in the human spirit. Follows that one three highly awarded plays: "El fin de Chipí González", "La Cabra y la Flor" and "Encrucijada del Espíritu Santo". The first one is about the problem of the freedom, the second one is about the beauty and the justice, and the third one is about the drama if the Jesuit utopia.

In 1930 there was published a compilation of articles published in journals entitled "Belle Epoque and other works" with a strong humorist accent. He also wrote other short stories in 1958 such as "Degradation", that received a mention in the 5th Short Stories Contest of the "La Tribuna" journal in spite that it was not in accord with the contest rules. As a story it was too long, as a novel it was too short, and the subject was very strong for that time.

In his "History of the Paraguayan Literature", Hugo Rodríguez-Alcalá writes about the dramatic work of this author: "Rivarola Matto knows how to create the characters and the ambient, and combines skillfully the serious and the hilarious. He's maybe the only outstanding Paraguayan writer with a fine sense of humor. His art is more effective in the presentation of the dramatic conflicts than on its conclusion".

== Work ==
In narrative is author of a novel, "Follaje en los ojos", from 1952, in which he shows the anguished life in the herbal manufactures of the Alto Paraná Department. Also has a collection of stories entitled "Mi pariente el cocotero", from 1974.

In his play production the most outstanding are: "El fin de Chipí González", comedy first performed in 1956, published in 1965 and adapted for radio-theater in Montevideo, distributed in discs for all América; "La Cabra y la Flor", awarded in 1965 in the Theater Contest of Radio Cáritas; "La encrucijada del Espíritu Santo" in 1972, awarded again for the Radio Cáritas. He also published in 1983 an anthology that joins three of his plays: "El fin de Chipí González", "La Cabra y la Flor" and "Su Señoría Tiene Miedo", that makes a strong critic to the Judicial State and only could be represented many years after the fall of the dictatorship of the General Alfredo Stroessner.

He published essays such as: "Hipótesis física del tiempo" (1987), "Reflexión sobre la violencia" (1987), "La no existencia física del tiempo" (1994) and an interesting and imaginative series of reflections given to know in the book "Belle Epoque and other works".

In his theatrical work exist a fundamental precedent in the Paraguayan contemporary theater: Encrucijada del Espíritu Santo (The Crossroads of the Holy Spirit), edited in 1972. It is the first dramatic close-up to the Jesuit missions. The main character is José, a young priest that appears old at the end of the story, expressing the continuous turns of the argument.

The author stated that it was a great synthesis deployed in the 17th and 18th Century in the Jesuit missions, although he did not gave more details about the time lapse. The narrative is lineal, starting from the evangelization of the natives to the banishment of the order in 1767, and the main consequence of that: the voluntary return of the natives to the wild because of the greed of the Paulists or Bandeirantes and the abandon of the Spanish colonial government.

This work is actually a flashback. Starts with a bard describing the resumed story, finishing with "Here is the answer", demonstrating that the play tries to answer questions that came from the possible historical interest of the viewer. Another aspect of the play is that concedes a notable human character to the priests, accentuated for the fall of José motivated by the love and sexual attraction to the native that he baptized as María, and to fight spiritual power with political power.

He married with María Emilia Mernes Recalde, and had 6 kids with her. Miguel Angel, José, Raúl, Oscar, Manuel and Carmen Lidia.

He died in Asunción, Paraguay on 13 September 1998.
