= Rodolfo Pérez Pimentel =

Ecuadorian lawyer, historian and biographer

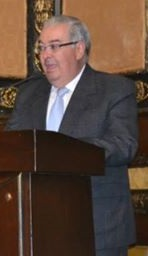
- Born: November 2, 1939 (age 86); Guayaquil, Ecuador
- Education: Doctorate of Jurisprudence (1979)
- Occupations: Lawyer, Biographer, Historian
- Spouse: Nuria Puig-Mir Game
- Children: Diego, Nuria and Antonio Pérez Puig-Mir
- Parent(s): Rodolfo Pérez Concha; María Pimentel Yépez
- Writing career
- Language: Spanish
- Notable awards: Premio Eugenio Espejo (2005)
- Website: rodolfoperezpimentel.com

Rodolfo Pérez Pimentel (born November 2, 1939, in Guayaquil) is an Ecuadorian lawyer, historian, and biographer. He was declared the lifetime chronicler of the city of Guayaquil, and is a member of the National Academy of Ecuadorian History. He was the 2005 recipient of the Premio Eugenio Espejo in Literature, awarded to him by President Alfredo Palacio.

== Biographical Dictionary of Ecuador ==
Pérez Pimentel is the author of the Biographical Dictionary of Ecuador (Diccionario biográfico del Ecuador), which consists of about 1,600 biographies of nationals and foreigners who have been an integral part of Ecuador.

== Premio Eugenio Espejo ==
The Premio Eugenio Espejo (Eugenio Espejo Prize) is the most coveted prize of the nation of Ecuador. It is awarded every two years in the fields of literature, art, culture, science, and to public or private institutions for their work.

The list of 2005's winners was entered into the Official Registry Nº 175 on December 28, 2005, and the actual ceremony took place in January 2006. Usually the winners are announced by August 9, to commemorate National Culture Day (Día de la Cultura Nacional), and to celebrate the anniversary of the creation of the Casa de la Cultura Ecuatoriana (The House of Ecuadorian Culture).

For that year's winners, the president Alfredo Palacio increased the monetary prize of the award from $2000 to $10,000. Besides the award money, the winners received medals and a lifetime stipend.

Pérez Pimentel won the prize in the literature category for his lifetime work as a biographer; Theo Constante won in the art category; Rodrigo Cabezas won in the science category; Luis Enrique Fierro won in the cultural activities category; and an award was given to the Academia Ecuatoriana de la Lengua (The Ecuadorian Academy of Language) for its history of excellence.

== Works ==
- Archivo Biográfico Ecuador
- Diccionario biográfico del Ecuador
- El Ecuador profundo
- Nuestro Guayaquil antiguo
- El Ecuador social
- Cuentos parasicológicos
- Libro de Misterio
