= Ana Lydia Vega =

Puerto Rican writer

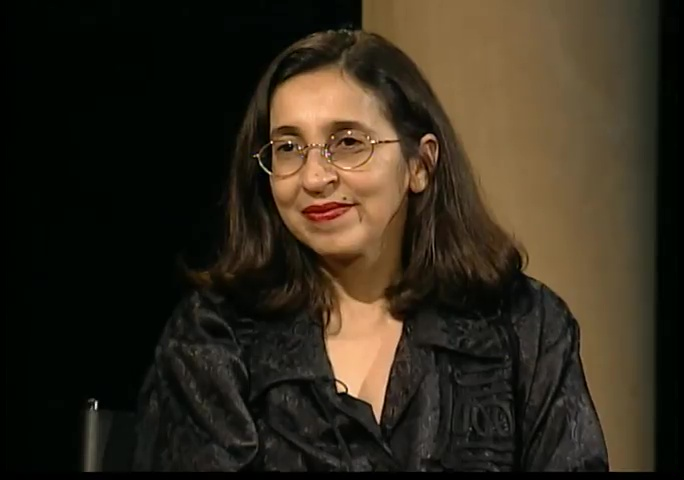
Vega on CUNY TV's Charlando con Cervantes, 1997

Ana Lydia Vega (born December 6, 1946, Santurce, Puerto Rico) is a Puerto Rican writer.

== Biography ==
Her parents were Virgilio Vega, an "oral poet" from Coamo, Puerto Rico, and Doña María Santana, a teacher from the town of Arroyo. She went to school at the Academia del Sagrado Corazón in Santurce, and studied at the University of Puerto Rico, earning a bachelor's degree in 1968. She went on to study at the University of Provence, France, earning a master's degree in French literature in 1971, and a doctorate in French literature in 1978. She has received the Premio Casa de las Américas (1982) and the Premio Juan Rulfo (1984). In 1985, she was selected as "Author of the Year" by the Puerto Rico Society of Authors. Vega was a professor of French literature and Caribbean studies at the University of Puerto Rico, Rio Piedras, and retired later.

== Work ==
=== In Spanish ===
==== Fiction ====
- Vírgenes y mártires (stories, with Carmen Lugo Filippi), 1981
- Encancaranublado y otros cuentos de naufragio, La Habana Casa de las Américas 1982, Premio Casa de las Américas 1982
- Pasión de historia y otras historias de pasión, 1987, Buenos Aires: Ediciones de la Flor, 2015
- Falsas crónicas del sur (stories), 1991, with Walter Torres, San Juan, Ed. Univ. de Puerto Rico 2009
- Ciertas crónicas del norte, 1992
- Cuentos calientes, México: Universidad Nacional Autónoma de México, 1996
- En la bahia de jobos: Celita Y El Mangle Zapatero (children's book, with Yolanda Pastrana Fuentes and Alida Ortiz Sotomayor), Editorial de la Universidad de Puerto Rico, 2004
- Esperando a Loló y otros delirios generacionales, San Juan, Editorial de la Universidad de Puerto Rico, 2006

==== Non-fiction ====
- El Tramo Ancla (Puerto Rican essays, introduction and editing by Vega), Editorial de la Universidad de Puerto Rico, 1991
- Mirada de doble filo, La Editorial, Universidad de Puerto Rico, 2008 - journalism

=== In translation ===
- True and false: stories and a novella/True and False Romances, translated by Andrew Hurley. London, New York: Serpent's Tail, 1994

== Writing Elements ==
=== Historic context ===
Puerto Rico's history plays a role in Vega's writings. The country became a U.S. territory under the Treaty of Paris (1898), after the Spanish–American War. Remorse still exists toward one of the leading causes of the war, and a number of people believe that the bombing of the US battleship USS Maine (ACR-1) was a conspiracy. This sentiment is present in Vega's works.

Puerto Rico became a commonwealth after adopting a constitution on July 25, 1952. Because of the nation's ties to the United States, English is mixed with Spanish to make up the dialect of the region, which is used in her writings. Migration to the United States is common, and it is also a theme in Vega's stories.

Vega's writing is also influenced by her familiarity with African oral traditions. In 1978, she wrote her doctoral thesis on the influence of Haitian leader Henri Christophe on African American theater and on theater in the Antilles. Vega's father was an accomplished practitioner of the Décima, a Puerto Rican form of poetry emphasizing improvisation.

== Reception of her work ==
Few of Ana Lydia Vega’s Spanish-language works have been translated into English, and "her catalog, whether in English or Spanish" was out of print as of 2015.

=== Critical studies in English ===
- Ana Lydia Vega, True and False Romances By: Feracho, Lesley. IN: Quintana, Reading U. S. Latina Writers: Remapping American Literature. New York, NY: Palgrave Macmillan; 2003. pp. 181–96
- Spanglish, TICKLING THE TONGUE: on Ana Lydia Vega and Giannina Braschi, by Ilan Stavans, World Literature Today, 2000.
1. Ana Lydia Vega: Linguistic Women and Another Counter-Assault or Can the Master(s) Hear? By: Labiosa, David J.. IN: Athey, Sharpened Edge: Women of Color, Resistance, and Writing. Westport, CT: Praeger; 2003. pp. 187–201
- The Representation of Puerto Rican Women in Two Short Stories by Ana Lydia Vega: 'Letra para salsa y tres soneos por encargo' (1979) and 'Pollito Chicken' (1977) By: Green, Mary; Tesserae: Journal of Iberian and Latin American Studies, 2002 Dec; 8 (2): 127–41
- Traces of Santería in Encancaranublado By: Pardo, Diana; Céfiro, 2002 Fall; 3 (1): 25–30
- Translating Laughter: Humor as a Special Challenge in Translating the Stories of Ana Lydia Vega By: Wallace, Carol J.; Journal of the Midwest Modern Language Association, 2002 Fall; 35 (2): 75–87
- Ana Lydia Vega's Falsas crónicas del sur: Reconstruction and Revision of Puerto Rico's Past By: Gosser-Esquilín, Mary Ann. IN: Juan-Navarro, and Young, A Twice-Told Tale: Reinventing the Encounter in Iberian/Iberian American Literature and Film. Newark, DE; London, England: U of Delaware P; Associated UP; 2001. pp. 193–209
- Intersections in Ana Lydia Vega's 'Pasión de historia' By: Craig, Linda; MaComère: Journal of the Association of Caribbean Women Writers and Scholars, 2001; 4: 71–83
- A Sense of Space, a Sense of Speech: A Conversation with Ana Lydia Vega By: Hernández, Carmen Dolores; Hopscotch: A Cultural Review, 2000; 2 (2): 52–59
- Virgins and Fleurs de Lys: Nation and Gender in Québec and Puerto Rico By: Den Tandt, Catherine. San Juan, Puerto Rico: Universidad de Puerto Rico; 2000
- "The Hispanic Post-Colonial Tourist" By: Martí-Olivella, Jaume; Arizona Journal of Hispanic Cultural Studies, 1997; 1: 23–42
- "Like English for Spanish: Meditaciones desde la frontera anglorriqueña" By: Unruh, Vicky; Siglo XX/20th Century, 1997; 15 (1–2): 147–61
- "Ana Lydia Vega, the Caribbean Storyteller" By: Puleo, Augustus; Afro-Hispanic Review, 1996 Fall; 15 (2): 21–25. (journal article)
- "Thematic and Narrative Strategies in Lydia Vega's 'Pollito chicken'" By: Engling, Ezra S.; College Language Association Journal, 1996 Mar; 39 (3): 341–56
- "'What's Wrong with this Picture?' Ana Lydia Vega's 'Caso omiso'" By: Boling, Becky; Revista de Estudios Hispánicos, 1996; 23: 315–24
- "Subverting and Re-Defining Sexuality in 'Three Love Aerobics' by Ana Lydia Vega" By: Puleo, Augustus C.; Letras Femeninas, 1995 Spring-Fall; 21 (1-2): 57–67
- "'Así son': Salsa Music, Female Narratives, and Gender (De)Construction in Puerto Rico" By: Aparicio, Frances R.; Poetics Today, 1994 Winter; 15 (4): 659–84
- "Women and Writing in Puerto Rico: An Interview with Ana Lydia Vega" By: Hernández, Elizabeth; Callaloo: A Journal of African American and African Arts and Letters, 1994 Summer; 17 (3): 816–25
- "We Are (Not) in This Together: The Caribbean Imaginary in 'Encancaranublado' by Ana Lydia Vega" By: Vélez, Diana L.; Callaloo: A Journal of African American and African Arts and Letters, 1994 Summer; 17 (3): 826–33
- "Tracing Nation and Gender: Ana Lydia Vega" By: Den Tandt, Catherine; Revista de Estudios Hispanicos, 1994 Jan; 28 (1): 3–24
- "Contaminations linguistiques: Actes d'anéantissement ou d'enrichissement d'une langue?" By: Impériale, Louis. IN: Crochetière, Boulanger and Ouellon, Actes du XVe Congrès International des Linguistes, Québec, Université Laval, 9–14 août 1992: Les Langues menacées/Endangered Languages: Proceedings of the XVth International Congress of Linguists, Québec, Université Laval, 9–14 August 1992. Sainte-Foy: PU Laval; 1993. pp. III: 351-54
- "The Reproduction of Ideology in Ana Lydia Vega's 'Pasión de historia' and 'Caso omiso'" By: Boling, Becky; Letras Femeninas, 1991 Spring-Fall; 17 (1-2): 89-97
- "The Voice Recaptured: Fiction by Dany Bebel-Gisler and Ana Lydia Vega" By: Romero, Ivette; Journal of Caribbean Studies, 1991–1992 Winter-Spring; 8 (3): 159-65
- "Social Criticism in the Contemporary Short Story of Selected Puerto Rican Women Writers" By: Wallace, Jeanne C.; MACLAS: Latin American Essays, 1989; 3: 113-23
- "Pollito chicken: Split Subjectivity, National Identity and the Articulation of Female Sexuality in a Narrative by Ana Lydia Vega" By: Vélez, Diana L.; The Americas Review: A Review of Hispanic Literature and Art of the USA, 1986 Summer; 14 (2): 68–76
- "From a Woman's Perspective: The Short Stories of Rosario Ferré and Ana Lydia Vega" By: Fernandez Olmos, Margarite. IN: Meyer and Fernández Olmos, Contemporary Women Authors of Latin America: Introductory Essays. Brooklyn: Brooklyn Coll. P; 1983. pp. 78–90.

== See also ==
- List of Puerto Rican writers
- List of Puerto Ricans
- Puerto Rican literature
- Caribbean literature
