= List of governors of Puerto Rico =

This list of governors of Puerto Rico includes all persons who have held the office of Governor of Puerto Rico since its establishment under the rule of the Spanish Empire (1508–1898) to the present under the sovereignty of the United States (1898–present).

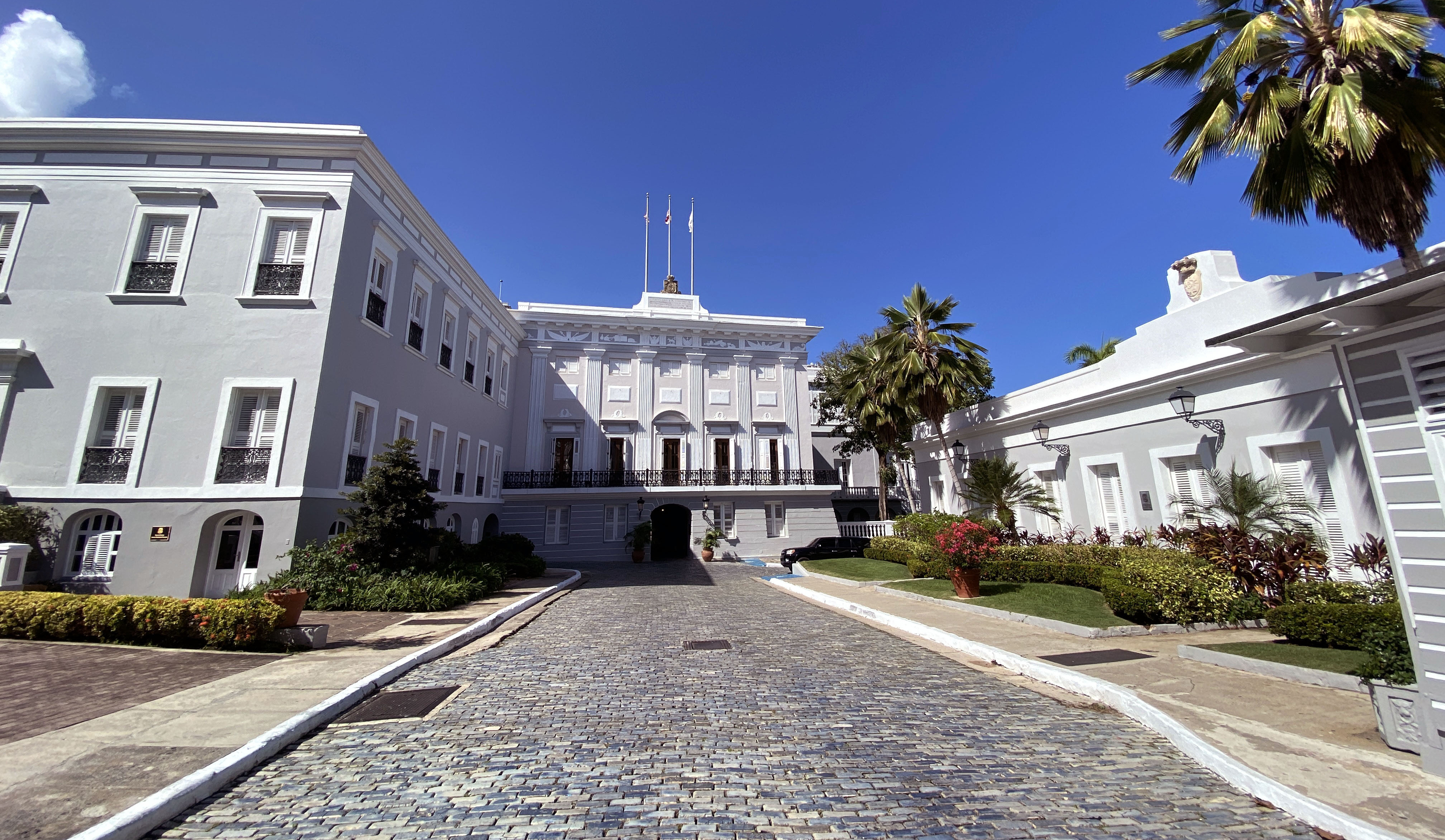
La Fortaleza, the official residence of the governor of Puerto Rico since the 16th century

The archipelago and island of Puerto Rico was annexed by the United States during the Spanish–American War in 1898, ending 390 years of active rule by the Spanish Empire, which began the European exploration, colonization, and settlement of the main island under conquistador Juan Ponce de León in 1508. Ponce de León was the first person to hold the title and office of governor by orders of King Ferdinand II of Aragon in 1509. The governor remained an appointee of the Spanish Crown during Spanish rule, and was an appointee of the President of the United States during American rule until 1948, when the residents of Puerto Rico began to popularly elect the governor, starting with Luis Muñoz Marín, who took office in 1949.

Since 1508, 167 persons (164 men and 3 women), have served in 190 formal, interim, or de facto governorships, as 17 governors have served twice nonconsecutively and 3 have served thrice nonconsecutively. Of the 190 governors, 175 have been appointed (149 by the Spanish Crown and 26 by the President of the United States), 14 elected through popular vote by the residents of Puerto Rico, and one constitutionally appointed after the resignation of an elected governor.

The governorship has been vacant twice, as two municipal administrators, called alcaldes ordinarios, served in place of a governor each year from 1537 to 1544 and 1548 to 1550. The shortest-serving governor was Andrés González Muñoz, who died hours after the start of his second interim governorship on January 11, 1898. Luis Muñoz Marín served the longest, having held the office for 16 consecutive years, or four terms of four years each, from 1949 to 1965, after he decided not to seek re-election. Ricardo Rosselló, who left office prematurely as a result of the Telegramgate scandal in 2019, is the first and only elected governor to have resigned. No elected governor has been impeached.

The first governor born in Puerto Rico was Ponce de León’s grandchild, Juan Ponce de León II, who served as interim governor from 1578 to 1580. He was the only Puerto Rican-born person to occupy the office until Ángel Rivero Méndez, who served in an interim capacity as the last governor under Spanish rule for two days from October 16 to 18, 1898. Several Puerto Ricans also briefly served as interim governors from 1921 to 1941. During the direct Spanish and American control of the governorship from 1508 to 1948, the first and only native Puerto Rican to have held the office in a formal capacity was Jesús T. Piñero, who served as the last appointed governor of Puerto Rico from 1946 to 1949.

Since 1949, the governor of Puerto Rico has served by popular election as the head of government of the Commonwealth of Puerto Rico, an unincorporated territory of the United States organized under the Constitution of Puerto Rico since its establishment in 1952. The incumbent governor is Jenniffer González, who was elected on November 5, 2024, and sworn in on January 2, 2025.

== History ==
=== Spanish Empire rule ===
With the European discovery of Puerto Rico during the second voyage of Christopher Columbus in November 1493, the archipelagic island was claimed by the Spanish Crown. In 1505, Spanish King Ferdinand II of Aragon ordered the colonization of Puerto Rico, appointing Spanish conquistador Vicente Yáñez Pinzón as its captain and corregidor to essentially serve as a de facto governor. However, Yáñez Pinzón never fulfilled the commission. Puerto Rico remained unexplored and unsettled by the Spanish Empire from 1493 to 1508.

In 1508, the King ordered Spanish conquistador Juan Ponce de León to conquer Puerto Rico, becoming the first European to explore, colonize, and settle the archipelago and island. In 1509, the title and position of governor of Puerto Rico was officially established by King Ferdinand II of Aragon, who appointed Ponce de León as the first holder of the office. The governor continued to be appointed by the Spanish Crown for 390 years, serving under various administrative entities: the Viceroyalty of the Indies (1508–1535), the Viceroyalty of New Spain (1535–1582), the Captaincy General of Puerto Rico (1582–1897), and the Autonomous Province of Puerto Rico (1897–1898).

From 1537 to 1544 and 1548 to 1550, the governorship remained vacant, as alcaldes ordinarios served in place of a governor. By order of King Charles I of Spain, two alcaldes ordinarios, one for the eastern cabildo of Partido de San Juan and the other for the western cabildo of Partido de San Germán, were elected each year by the regidores of each cabildo. The alcaldes ordinarios, who could only be re-elected two years after the end of their one-year term, served as municipal administrators and not governors.

From 1578 to 1580, Juan Ponce de León’s grandchild, Juan Ponce de León II, served as interim governor, becoming the first Puerto Rican-born person to serve as governor of the archipelago and island. He was the only Puerto Rican-born person to occupy the office until Ángel Rivero Méndez, who served for three days as interim governor from October 16 to October 18, 1898.

With the English occupation of San Juan, the capital city of Puerto Rico, from June to November 1598, which was the only complete takeover of the city by a foreign power before its peaceful transfer to the Americans after hostilities stopped during the Spanish–American War in October 1898, the governor, Antonio de Mosquera, surrendered and was exiled to Cartagena de Indias in Colombia. However, the English, led by George Clifford and John Berkeley, failed to keep the city and to gain control of the main island. From November 1598 to March 1599, former governor Pedro Suárez Coronel, who had been imprisoned in San Juan’s El Morro fortress, assumed the governorship after the retreat of the English and arrival of Mosquera’s formal replacement, Alonso de Mercado.

=== United States sovereignty ===
In 1898, the President of the United States assumed the authority to appoint the person occupying the office as a result of the annexation of the archipelago and island by the United States during Spanish American War.

While General Nelson A. Miles led the American invasion and occupation of Puerto Rico from July 25 to August 13, 1898, he never served as governor, as that responsibility was assigned to fellow General John R. Brooke, who was head of the American delegation to the commission for the peaceful transfer of sovereignty over Puerto Rico from Spain to the United States, as stipulated in the armistice signed by the two countries on August 12. After the departure of the Spanish officials from San Juan on October 16, Brooke became the first American governor of the archipelago and island on October 18, 1898, succeeding interim governor Ángel Rivero Méndez, who was the last governor under Spanish administration.

Under the military (1898–1900) and insular civil governments (1900–1952) of Puerto Rico, the latter of which was established by the Foraker Act of 1900 and expanded by the Jones–Shafroth Act of 1917, the governor remained an appointee of the American president from 1898 to 1948. While several Puerto Ricans briefly served as interim governors during this period, the only native Puerto Rican to be appointed to the governorship was Jesús T. Piñero, who served as the last appointed governor of Puerto Rico from 1946 to 1949. Piñero was the first and only native Puerto Rican to held the office in a formal, not interim capacity during the direct Spanish and American control of the governorship from 1508 to 1948.

In 1947, the Elective Governor Act granted the residents of Puerto Rico the power to elect the governor through popular vote. The first election for the governorship was held in 1948, resulting in the victory of Luis Muñoz Marín, who became the first democratically elected governor. Since 1949, the governor of Puerto Rico has served by popular election as the head of government of the Commonwealth of Puerto Rico, an unincorporated territory of the United States organized under the Constitution of Puerto Rico since 1952.

In 2019, governor Ricardo Rosselló, alongside other members of his cabinet, including the Secretary of State, resigned as a result of the Telegramgate scandal, becoming the first elected governor to step down. Before leaving office, Rosselló named Pedro Pierluisi as state secretary, with the intention of making Pierluisi his successor, as the state secretary is the first official in the gubernatorial line of succession. Pierluisi was sworn in as governor after Rosselló’s resignation. However, his tenure only lasted five days, as the Supreme Court ruled that his assumption of the office was unconstitutional because his nomination as state secretary was never confirmed by the Legislative Assembly. He was succeeded by the next official in the gubernatorial line of succession, Secretary of Justice Wanda Vázquez Garced, who became the first governor to serve through constitutional appointment.

== Spanish Empire rule (1508–1898) ==
This list includes all governors of Puerto Rico who served under the Spanish Empire from the start of the colonization of the archipelago and island in 1508 to the end of Spanish rule as a result of the Spanish-American War in 1898. Governors are divided by the administrative territorial entity under which they directly served.

Century
16th – 17th – 18th – 19th

=== Viceroyalty of the Indies (1508–1535) ===
In 1492, when explorer Christopher Columbus took possession of the West Indies in the Caribbean in the name of the Spanish Empire, pursuant to the provisions of the Capitulations of Santa Fe granted by the Catholic Monarchs of Spain, the Viceroyalty of the Indies was established as an administrative entity, with Columbus as its first viceroy and governor. Headquartered in the Captaincy General of Santo Domingo in Hispaniola, it was primarily composed of the Greater and Lesser Antilles islands discovered by Columbus during his voyages to the Americas, including the archipelago and island of Puerto Rico, where he landed during his second voyage in 1493.

From the start of the colonization of Puerto Rico by Juan Ponce León in 1508 to the merging of the Viceroyalty of the Indies into the Viceroyalty of New Spain in 1535, the governor of Puerto Rico operated under the jurisdiction of the Spanish Crown, which exercised its authority through the monarch of Spain, the president of the Council of the Indies, and the viceroy and governor of the Viceroyalty of the Indies, who was also the governor of the Captaincy General of Santo Domingo and the president of the Real Audiencia of Santo Domingo in Hispaniola.

No.	Signature (Note: Signature of the governor is included as most governors do not have a portrait.)	Name (Birth–Death)	Tenure			Ref(s)
No.	Signature	Name (Birth–Death)	Start	End	Duration	Ref(s)
1		Juan; Ponce de León (c. 1474–1521)	June 15, 1508	October 28, 1509	1 year, 135 days	
2		Juan; Cerón (unknown)	October 28, 1509	March 2, 1510	125 days	
3		Juan; Ponce de León (c. 1474–1521)	March 2, 1510	June 21, 1511	1 year, 111 days	
4		Gonzalo de Ovalle; Interim (unknown)	June 21, 1511	November 28, 1511	160 days	
5		Juan; Cerón (unknown)	November 28, 1511	June 2, 1512	187 days	
6		Rodrigo de Moscoso (unknown)	June 2, 1512	February; 1513	≥ 244 days	
7		Cristóbal de Mendoza (unknown)	February; 1513	July 15, 1515	≥ 2 years, 137 days	
8		Juan; Ponce de León (c. 1474–1521)	July 15, 1515	September 12, 1519	4 years, 59 days	
9		Antonio de la Gama (c. 1489)	September 12, 1519	January 15, 1521	1 year, 125 days	
10		Pedro; Moreno (unknown)	January 15, 1521	May; 1523	≥ 2 years, 106 days	
11		Alonso; Manso; Interim (1460–1539)	May; 1523	1524	≥ 215 days	
12		Pedro; Moreno (unknown)	1524	June; 1529	≥ 4 years, 152 days	
13		Antonio de la Gama (c. 1489)	June; 1529	1530	≥ 185 days	
14		Francisco; Manuel de Lando (d. 1536)	1530	August; 1536	≥ 6 years, 183 days	

=== Viceroyalty of New Spain (1535–1582) ===
In 1535, the administrative entity of the Viceroyalty of the Indies was merged into the newly-created Viceroyalty of New Spain. Headquartered in Mexico City, it was composed of Mexico, the Louisiana Purchase, Florida, and the states west of the Mississippi River in the United States, British Columbia in Canada, Guatemala, Belize, Costa Rica, El Salvador, Honduras, and Nicaragua in Central America, Cuba, Jamaica, Hispaniola, Puerto Rico, and the Lesser Antilles in the insular Caribbean, and Venezuela in South America.

From the establishment of the Viceroyalty of New Spain in 1535 to the creation of the Captaincy General of Puerto Rico in 1582, the governor of Puerto Rico operated under the jurisdiction of the Spanish Crown, which exercised its authority through the monarch of Spain, the president of the Council of the Indies, the viceroy of the Viceroyalty of New Spain, and the president of the Real Audiencia of Santo Domingo, who was also the governor of the Captaincy General of Santo Domingo in Hispaniola.

No.	Signature	Name (Birth–Death)	Tenure			Ref(s)
No.	Signature	Name (Birth–Death)	Start	End	Duration	Ref(s)
15		Vasco de Tiedra (unknown)	August; 1536	September 28, 1537	≥ 1 year, 28 days	
– (Note: The tenures of alcaldes ordinarios are not statistically counted, as they served as municipal administrators and not governors. By order of King Charles I of Spain, two alcaldes ordinarios, one for the eastern cabildo of Partido de San Juan and the other for the western cabildo of Partido de San Germán, were elected each year by the regidores of each cabildo.)		Vacant; Alcaldes ordinarios	September 28, 1537	1544	≥ 6 years, 95 days	
16		Jerónimo; Lebrón de Quiñones (1505–1545)	1544	July 6, 1545	≥ 187 days	
17		Iñigo; López; Cervantes y Loaysa (unknown)	July 6, 1545	July 6, 1546	1 year, 0 days	
18		Diego de Carasa (d. 1570)	July 6, 1546	1548	≥ 1 year, 179 days	
–		Vacant; Alcaldes ordinarios	1548	1550	≥ 1 year, 1 day	
19		Luis de Vallejo (unknown)	1550	1555	≥ 4 years, 1 day	
20		Alonso; Estévez (unknown)	1555	August 12, 1555	≥ 1 day	
21		Diego de Carasa (d. 1570)	August 12, 1555	1561	≥ 5 years, 142 days	
22		Antonio de la Llama; Vallejo (unknown)	1561	March 20, 1564	≥ 2 years, 80 days	
23		Francisco; Bahamonde de Lugo (d. 1574)	March 20, 1564	December 31, 1568	4 years, 286 days	
24		Francisco de Solís; Osorio (unknown)	December 31, 1568	1575	≥ 6 years, 1 day	
25		Francisco de Ovando y Mexía (c. 1546–1579)	1575	December; 1578	≥ 2 years, 335 days	
26		Juan; Ponce de León II; Interim (1524–1591)	December; 1578	1580	≥ 1 year, 1 day	
27		Jerónimo de Agüero; Campuzano; Interim (unknown)	1580	April 24, 1580	≥ 1 day	
28		Juan de Céspedes (d. 1591)	April 24, 1580	August 2, 1581	1 year, 100 days	
29		Juan; López; Melgarejo; Interim (unknown)	August 2, 1581	June 12, 1582	314 days	

=== Captaincy General of Puerto Rico (1582–1898) ===
In 1582, the administrative entity of the Captaincy General of Puerto Rico was established as part of the Viceroyalty of New Spain. It was composed of the archipelago and island of Puerto Rico.

From the establishment of the Captaincy General of Puerto Rico in 1582 to the creation of the Autonomous Province of Puerto Rico in 1898, the governor of Puerto Rico operated under the jurisdiction of the Spanish Crown, which exercised its authority through the monarch of Spain, the viceroy of the Viceroyalty of New Spain (1582–1821), the president of the Council of the Indies (1582–1714), the secretary of the Secretariat of the Navy and the Indies (1714–1754), the secretary of the Secretariat of State and the Office of the Indies (1754–1863), and the minister of the Ministry of Overseas (1863–1897), and the Valido (1598–1705), the Secretary of State and the Universal Bureau (1705–1734), the First Secretary of State (1734–1823), and the Prime Minister (1823–1897). The Captaincy General of Puerto Rico was under the jurisdiction of the president of the Real Audiencia of Santo Domingo until the creation of the Real Audiencia of Puerto Rico in 1831.

No.	Portrait (Note: The signature of the governor is included when his portrait is unavailable.)	Name (Birth–Death)	Tenure			Ref(s)
No.	Portrait	Name (Birth–Death)	Start	End	Duration	Ref(s)
30		Diego; Menéndez de Valdés (1553–1596)	June 12, 1582	May 11, 1593	10 years, 333 days	
31		Pedro; Suárez; Coronel (unknown)	May 11, 1593	December 20, 1597	≥ 4 years, 223 days	
32		Antonio de Mosquera (unknown)	December 20, 1597	June 21, 1598	183 days	
Start of the English occupation of San Juan
– (Note: As the English, led by George Clifford and John Berkeley, failed to keep the capital city, San Juan, and to gain control of the main island, their tenures are not statistically counted. With the English occupation of San Juan from June to November 1598, governor Antonio de Mosquera surrendered and was exiled to Cartagena de Indias in Colombia.)		George; Clifford (1558–1605)	June 21, 1598	August 13, 1598	53 days	
–		John; Berkeley (unknown)	August 13, 1598	September 23, 1598	41 days	
End of the English occupation of San Juan
33 (Note: The de facto tenure of Pedro Suárez Coronel from November 1598 to March 1599 is statistically counted, as the former governor assume the governorship after the retreat of the English and arrival of Mosquera’s formal replacement, Alonso de Mercado.)		Pedro; Suárez; Coronel de facto (unknown)	September 23, 1598	March 22, 1599	181 days	
34		Alonso de Mercado (unknown)	March 22, 1599	August 7, 1602	3 years, 138 days	
35		Sancho; Ochoa de Castro (1566–1608)	August 7, 1602	July 22, 1608	5 years, 350 days	
36		Gabriel de Rojas; Páramo (1565–c. 1620)	July 22, 1608	April; 1614	≥ 5 years, 283 days	
37		Felipe de Beaumont y Navarra (1564–1626)	April; 1614	May 31, 1620	≥ 6 years, 31 days	
38		Juan de Vargas; Asejas (1587–1631)	May 31, 1620	August 25, 1625	5 years, 86 days	
39		Juan de Haro y Sanvítores (1565–1632)	August 25, 1625	August; 1631	≥ 5 years, 341 days	
40		Enrique; Enríquez de Sotomayor (c. 1560–1638)	August; 1631	June 27, 1635	≥ 3 years, 300 days	
41		Iñigo de la Mota; Sarmiento (b. 1598)	June 27, 1635	June; 1641	≥ 5 years, 339 days	
42		Agustín de Silva y Figueroa (c. 1600–1641)	June; 1641	December; 1641	≥ 154 days	
43		Juan de Bolaños; Interim (unknown)	December; 1641	July 9, 1643	≥ 1 year, 190 days	
44		Fernando de la Riva; Agüero y Setién (1606–1663)	July 9, 1643	July 12, 1650	7 years, 3 days	
45		Diego de Aguilera y Gamboa (1606–1667)	July 12, 1650	March 25, 1656	5 years, 257 days	
46		José de Novoa y Moscoso (b. 1607)	March 25, 1656	August 28, 1661	5 years, 156 days	
47		Juan; Pérez de Guzmán (c. 1618)	August 28, 1661	November 23, 1664	3 years, 87 days	
48		Jerónimo de Velasco (unknown)	November 23, 1664	August 16, 1670	5 years, 266 days	
49		Gaspar de Arteaga y Lequedano (c. 1619–1674)	August 16, 1670	March 7, 1674	3 years, 203 days	
50		Diego de Robledillo y Velasco; Interim (unknown)	March 7, 1674	July 20, 1674	163 days	
51		Baltasar de Figueroa y Castilla; Interim (unknown)	July 20, 1674	April 2, 1675	256 days	
52		Alonso de Campos y Espinosa (unknown)	April 2, 1675	1678	≥ 2 years, 274 days	
53		Juan de Robles; Lorenzana (unknown)	1678	July 14, 1683	≥ 4 years, 195 days	
54		Gaspar; Martínez de Andino (unknown)	July 14, 1683	May 5, 1690	6 years, 295 days	
55		Gaspar de Arredondo y Valle (unknown)	May 5, 1690	August 11, 1695	5 years, 99 days	
56		Juan; Fernández; Franco de Medina (c. 1646–1698)	August 11, 1695	May 16, 1698	2 years, 278 days	
57		Antonio de Robles; Silva; Interim (unknown)	May 16, 1698	October 17, 1699	1 year, 154 days	
58		Gaspar de Arredondo y Valle; Interim (unknown)	October 17, 1699	June 21, 1700	247 days	
59		Gabriel; Gutiérrez de Riva (1655–1703)	June 21, 1700	July 23, 1703	3 years, 32 days	
60		Diego; Jiménez de Villarán; Interim (unknown)	July 23, 1703	October 12, 1703	81 days	
61		Francisco; Sánchez; Calderón; Interim (unknown)	October 12, 1703	1704	≥ 81 days	
62		Pedro de Arroyo y Guerrero; Interim (d. 1706)	1704	1706	≥ 1 year, 1 day	
63		Juan; López de Morla; Interim (unknown)	1706	1706	≥ 1 day	
64		Francisco; Danio; Granados (unknown)	1706	1709	≥ 2 years, 1 day	
65		Juan de Ribera (unknown)	1709	May 3, 1716	≥ 6 years, 124 days	
66		José; Francisco; Carreño; Interim (unknown)	May 3, 1716	August 30, 1716	119 days	
67		Alberto; Bertodano y Navarra (unknown)	August 30, 1716	April 7, 1720	3 years, 221 days	
68		Francisco; Danio; Granados (unknown)	April 7, 1720	August 22, 1724	4 years, 137 days	
69		José; Antonio de Mendizábal y Azcue (unknown)	August 22, 1724	October 11, 1731	7 years, 50 days	
70		Matías de Abadía (unknown)	October 11, 1731	June 28, 1743	11 years, 260 days	
71		Domingo; Pérez de Nanclares; Interim (unknown)	June 28, 1743	October 29, 1743	123 days	
72		Juan; José; Colomo (d. 1750)	October 29, 1743	August 11, 1750	6 years, 286 days	
73		Agustín de Pareja (d. 1751)	August 11, 1750	July 8, 1751	331 days	
74		Esteban; Bravo de Rivero; Interim (unknown)	July 8, 1751	May 1, 1753	1 year, 297 days	
75		Felipe; Ramírez de Estenoz (unknown)	May 1, 1753	August 30, 1757	4 years, 121 days	
76		Esteban; Bravo de Rivero; Interim (unknown)	August 30, 1757	June 3, 1759	1 year, 277 days	
77		Antonio de Guazo; Calderón' (d. 1760)	June 3, 1759	March 7, 1760	278 days	
78		Esteban; Bravo de Rivero; Interim (unknown)	March 7, 1760	November 29, 1760	267 days	
79		Ambrosio de Benavides (1718–1787)	November 29, 1760	March 12, 1766	5 years, 103 days	
80		Marcos de Vergara (unknown)	March 12, 1766	October 28, 1766	230 days	
81		José; Tentor; Interim (unknown)	October 28, 1766	July 31, 1770	3 years, 276 days	
82		Miguel de Muesas (unknown)	July 31, 1770	June 2, 1776	5 years, 307 days	
83		José; Dufresne (1707–1786)	June 2, 1776	April 6, 1783	6 years, 305 days	
84		Juan; Andrés; Daban y Busterino (1724–1793)	April 6, 1783	March 27, 1789	5 years, 355 days	
85		Francisco; Torralbo y Robles; Interim (c. 1740–1795)	March 27, 1789	July 8, 1789	103 days	
86		Miguel; Antonio de Ustáriz (d. 1792)	July 8, 1789	March 27, 1792	2 years, 263 days	
87		Francisco; Torralbo y Robles; Interim (c. 1740–1795)	March 27, 1792	1794	≥ 1 year, 280 days	
88		Henrique de Grimarest (unknown)	1794	March 21, 1795	≥ 80 days	
89		Ramón de Castro y Gutiérrez (1751–c. 1812)	March 21, 1795	November 12, 1804	9 years, 236 days	
90		Toribio; Montes y Pérez (1749–1828)	November 12, 1804	June 30, 1809	4 years, 230 days	
91		Salvador; Meléndez y Bruna (1757–1824)	June 30, 1809	March 22, 1820	10 years, 266 days	
92		Juan; Vasco y Pascual (unknown)	March 24, 1820	August 7, 1820	136 days	
93		Gonzalo; Aróstegui y Herrera (1774–1839)	August 7, 1820	February 12, 1822	1 year, 189 days	
94		José de Navarro; Interim (unknown)	February 12, 1822	May 30, 1822	107 days	
95		Francisco; González de Linares (unknown)	May 30, 1822	December 4, 1822	215 days	
96		Miguel; Luciano de la Torre y Pando (1786–1843)	December 4, 1822	January 16, 1837	14 years, 269 days	
97		Francisco; Moreda y Prieto (unknown)	January 16, 1837	December 16, 1837	334 days	
98		Miguel; López de Baños (1779–1861)	December 16, 1837	October 2, 1840	2 years, 291 days	
99		Santiago; Méndez de Vigo (1791–1860)	October 2, 1840	April 24, 1844	3 years, 205 days	
100		Rafael de Arístegui y Vélez (1794–1863)	April 24, 1844	December 15, 1847	3 years, 235 days	
101		Juan; Prim y Prats (1814–1870)	December 15, 1847	September 5, 1848	265 days	
102		Juan de la Pezuela y Cevallos (1810–1906)	September 5, 1848	April 21, 1851	2 years, 228 days	
103		Enrique de España y Taberner (1801–1878)	April 21, 1851	May 4, 1852	1 year, 13 days	
104		Fernando; Norzagaray y Escudero (1808–1860)	May 4, 1852	January 31, 1855	2 years, 272 days	
105		Andrés; García; Camba (1793–1861)	January 31, 1855	August 23, 1855	204 days	
106		José; Lémery e Ibarrola (1811–1886)	August 23, 1855	January 28, 1857	1 year, 158 days	
107		Fernando; Cotoner y Chacón (1810–1888)	January 28, 1857	July 31, 1860	3 years, 185 days	
108		Sabino Gámir Maladén; Interim (unknown)	July 13, 1860	August 19, 1860	37 days	
109		Rafaél de Echagüe y Bermingham (1815–1887)	August 19, 1860	March 12, 1862	1 year, 205 days	
110		Rafael; Izquierdo y Gutiérrez; Interim (1820–1883)	March 12, 1862	April 29, 1862	48 days	
111		Félix María de Messina; Iglesias (1798–1872)	April 29, 1862	November 18, 1865	3 years, 203 days	
112		José María; Marchessi y Oleaga (1801–1882)	November 18, 1865	December 17, 1867	2 years, 29 days	
113		Julián; Juan; Pavía y Lacy (1812–1870)	December 17, 1867	December 30, 1868	1 year, 13 days	
114		José; Laureano; Sanz y Posse (1819–1898)	December 30, 1868	May 28, 1870	1 year, 149 days	
115		Gabriel; Baldrich y Palau (1814–1895)	May 28, 1870	September 13, 1871	1 year, 108 days	
116		Ramón; Gómez; Pulido (1811–1875)	September 13, 1871	July 30, 1872	321 days	
117		Simón de la Torre y Ormaza (1803–1884)	July 30, 1872	November 25, 1872	118 days	
118		Joaquín; Enrile y Hernán; Interim (b. 1818)	November 25, 1872	February 14, 1873	81 days	
119		Juan; Martínez; Plowes (1808–1887)	February 14, 1873	April 14, 1873	59 days	
120		Rafael; Primo de Rivera y Sobremonte (1813–1902)	April 14, 1873	February 2, 1874	294 days	
121		José; Laureano; Sanz y Posse (1819–1898)	February 2, 1874	December 15, 1875	1 year, 316 days	
122		Segundo de la Portilla y Gutiérrez (b. 1819)	December 15, 1875	October 25, 1877	1 year, 314 days	
123		Manuel de la Serna; Hernández; Pinzón (1809–1878)	October 25, 1877	April 26, 1878	183 days	
124		José; Gamir; Maladen; Interim (1835–1896)	April 26, 1878	June 24, 1878	59 days	
125		Eulogio; Despujols y Dussay (1834–1807)	June 24, 1878	July 6, 1881	3 years, 12 days	
126		Segundo de la Portilla y Gutierrez (b. 1819)	July 6, 1881	November 23, 1882	1 year, 140 days	
127		Miguel de la Vega; Inclán y Palma (1820–1884)	November 23, 1882	July 31, 1884	1 year, 251 days	
128		Carlos; Suances y Campos; Interim (1818–1891)	July 31, 1884	September 19, 1884	50 days	
129		Ramón; Fajardo e Izquierdo; Interim (1826–1888)	September 19, 1884	November 1, 1884	33 days	
130		Carlos; Suances y Campos; Interim (1818–1891)	November 1, 1884	November 23, 1884	22 days	
131		Luis; Daban y Ramírez de Arellano (1841–1892)	November 23, 1884	January 10, 1887	2 years, 48 days	
132		Juan; Contreras; Martínez; Interim (1834–1907)	January 10, 1887	March 23, 1887	72 days	
133		Romualdo; Palacios; González (1827–1908)	March 23, 1887	November 11, 1887	233 days	
134		Juan; Contreras; Martínez; Interim (1834–1907)	November 11, 1887	February 23, 1888	104 days	
135		Pedro; Ruiz; Dana (1826–1891)	February 23, 1888	April 18, 1890	2 years, 54 days	
136		José; Pascual; Bonanza; Interim (1834–1892)	April 18, 1890	April 21, 1890	3 days	
137		José; Lasso; Pérez (1837–1913)	April 21, 1890	November 15, 1892	2 years, 208 days	
138		Manuel; Delgado y Zuleta; Interim (1842–1915)	November 15, 1892	January 10, 1893	56 days	
139	Antonio Daban - 1895	Antonio; Daban y Ramírez de Arrellano (1844–1902)	January 10, 1893	June 1, 1895	2 years, 142 days	
140		Andrés; González; Muñoz; Interim (1840–1898)	June 1, 1895	June 20, 1895	19 days	
141		José; Gamir; Maladen (1835–1896)	June 20, 1895	January 17, 1896	211 days	
142		Emilio; March; García; Interim (1844–1919)	January 17, 1896	February 15, 1896	29 days	
143		Sabas; Marín; González (1831–1901)	February 15, 1896	January 4, 1898	1 year, 323 days	
144		Ricardo de Ortega y Díez; Interim (1838–1917)	January 4, 1898	January 11, 1898	7 days	
145		Andrés; González; Muñoz (1840–1898)	January 11, 1898	January 11, 1898	8 hours	
146		Ricardo de Ortega y Díez; Interim (1838–1917)	January 11, 1898	February 2, 1898	22 days	

=== Autonomous Province of Puerto Rico (1898) ===
==== Autonomy Charter of Puerto Rico (1897–1898) ====
In 1897, the Spanish Crown granted local autonomous administration to Puerto Rico under a statute of autonomy, authorizing the establishment of the Autonomous Province of Puerto Rico, with a government headed by a partially democratically elected bicameral parliament and a governor, who remained an appointee of the Crown. From the implementation of the Autonomous Province of Puerto Rico in February 1898 to the annexation of the archipelago and island by the United States during the Spanish–American War in October 1898, the governor of Puerto Rico operated under the jurisdiction of the Spanish Crown, which exercised its authority through the monarch, the prime minister, and the overseas minister.

No.	Portrait	Name (Birth–Death)	Tenure			Ref(s)
No.	Portrait	Name (Birth–Death)	Start	End	Duration	Ref(s)
147		Manuel; Macías y Casado (1844–1937)	February 2, 1898	October 14, 1898	254 days	
148		Ricardo de Ortega y Díez; Interim (1838–1917)	October 14, 1898	October 16, 1898	2 days	
149		Ángel; Rivero; Méndez; Interim (1856–1930)	October 16, 1898	October 18, 1898	2 days	

== United States sovereignty (1898–present) ==
This list includes all governors of Puerto Rico who have served under the United States from the start of the annexation of the archipelago and island during the Spanish-American War in 1898 to the present. Governors are divided by the administrative territorial entity under which they directly served.

Century
19th – 20th – 21st

=== Military Government of Porto Rico (1898–1900) ===
In 1898, the United States bombarded, invaded, occupied, and annexed the archipelago and island of Puerto Rico during the Spanish–American War. The United States Navy carried out the Bombardment of San Juan, the fortified capital city in northeastern Puerto Rico (today the historic quarter of Old San Juan), on May 12, while the United States Army began the land invasion of the territory through the municipality of Guánica in southwestern Puerto Rico on July 25. After an armistice, a cease-fire agreement, was signed on August 12, the active hostilities between Spain and the United States stopped, with the war officially ending by the signing of the Treaty of Paris on December 10. The armistice and treaty led to Spain ceding Cuba, Puerto Rico, and Guam to the United States and agreed to the American occupation of Manila in the Philippines.

The Spanish Empire rule of Puerto Rico effectively ended on October 18, when the United States assumed sovereignty over the territory, establishing the Military Government of Porto Rico (the spelling "Porto Rico" was officially used by U.S. government until 1932), which operated under the Bureau of Insular Affairs of the United States Department of War. From the establishment of the Military Government Porto Rico in 1898 to the creation of the Insular Government of Porto Rico in 1900, the governor of Puerto Rico was under the jurisdiction of the President of the United States, William McKinley, and his Secretary of War, Elihu Root.

No.	Portrait	Name (Birth–Death)	Tenure			Ref(s)
No.	Portrait	Name (Birth–Death)	Start	End	Duration	Ref(s)
– (Note: While General Nelson A. Miles led the American invasion of Puerto Rico during the Spanish–American War from July 25 to August 14, 1898, he never served as governor, and thus, he is not statistically counted. From August 15 to October 18, fellow General John R. Brooke oversaw the peaceful transfer of sovereignty over Puerto Rico from Spain to the United States, as stipulated in the armistice signed by the two countries on August 12. After the departure of the Spanish officials from the capital, San Juan, on October 16, Brooke became the first American governor of the archipelago and island on October 18, succeeding the interim governor Ángel Rivero Méndez, who was the last governor under Spanish administration.)		Nelson A. Miles (1839–1925)	July 25, 1898	August 13, 1898	19 days	
150		John R. Brooke (1838–1926)	October 18, 1898	December 6, 1898	49 days	
151		Guy; V. Henry (1839–1899)	December 6, 1898	May 9, 1899	154 days	
152		George W. Davis (1839–1918)	May 9, 1899	May 1, 1900	357 days	

=== Insular Government of Porto Rico (1900–1952) ===
In 1900, the Insular Government of Porto Rico replaced the Military Government of Porto Rico, establishing a civil government in Puerto Rico as the local administration of an unincorporated territory under the sovereign federal jurisdiction of the United States. The insular government was organized under the organic acts of the Foraker Act from 1900 to 1917 and the Jones–Shafroth Act from 1917 to 1952.

==== Foraker Act (1900–1917) ====
The Foraker Act divided the local government of Puerto Rico into three branches: an executive, consisting of a Governor and an 11-member Executive Council appointed by the President of the United States, a legislative, composed of bicameral Legislative Assembly, with the Executive Council as its upper chamber and a 35-member House of Delegates elected by the residents of Puerto Rico as its lower chamber, and a judicial, headed by a chief justice and a district judge appointed by the President. The Act also created the office of Resident Commissioner, a non-voting member to the United States House of Representatives elected by the residents of Puerto Rico.

During the Insular Government of Porto Rico, from the passing of the Foraker Act in 1900 to the implementation of the Jones–Shafroth Act in 1917, the governor of Puerto Rico was under the jurisdiction of the President of the United States and his Secretary of War, as the territory operated under the Bureau of Insular Affairs of the United States Department of War.

No.	Portrait	Name (Birth–Death)	Tenure			Ref(s)
No.	Portrait	Name (Birth–Death)	Start	End	Duration	Ref(s)
153		Charles; H. Allen (1848–1934)	May 1, 1900	September 15, 1901	1 year, 137 days	
154		William; H. Hunt (1857–1949)	September 15, 1901	July 4, 1904	2 years, 293 days	
155		Beekman; Winthrop (1874–1940)	July 4, 1904	April 17, 1907	2 years, 287 days	
156		Regis; H. Post (1870–1944)	April 17, 1907	November 6, 1909	2 years, 203 days	
157		George; R. Colton (1865–1916)	November 6, 1909	November 15, 1913	4 years, 9 days	
158 (Note: The continuous tenure of Arthur Yager was authorized under the Foraker Act of 1900 from November 15, 1913 to March 2, 1917, and under the Jones–Shafroth Act of 1917 from March 2, 1917 to May 15, 1921.)		Arthur; Yager (1858–1941)	November 15, 1913	March 2, 1917	3 years, 107 days	

==== Jones–Shafroth Act (1917–1952) ====
The Jones–Shafroth Act established a bill of rights based on the United States Bill of Rights and granted statutory birthright United States citizenship to anyone born in the archipelago and island of Puerto Rico on or after April 11, 1899.

The Act expanded the executive and legislative branches of the Insular Government of Porto Rico. It created the executive departments of Justice, Education, Finance, Interior, Labor and Agriculture, and Health, with their heads, the first two appointed by the President of the United States, and the rest appointed by the Governor, who was also appointed by the President, forming an executive council to the Governor. It formed a legislative 19-member Senate elected by the residents of Puerto Rico, and increased the membership and term length of the House of Representatives to 39 popularly elected members serving four-year terms. It also increased to four years the term length of the Resident Commissioner, a non-voting member to the United States House of Representatives elected by the residents of Puerto Rico.

During the Insular Government of Porto Rico, from the passing of the Jones–Shafroth Act in 1917 to the implementation of the Elective Governor Act in 1948, which granted the residents of Puerto Rico the power to elect the governor through popular vote, the governor of Puerto Rico was under the jurisdiction of the President of the United States. As part of the Bureau of Insular Affairs of the United States Department of War, it remained under the purview of the Secretary of War until 1934, when the responsibility was assumed by the Secretary of Interior, as Puerto Rico was transferred to the Division of Territories and Island Possessions of the United States Department of Interior. Puerto Rico remained under said organization until the proclamation of the Constitution of Puerto Rico in 1952, when it achieved complete local self-governance as the Commonwealth of Puerto Rico.

No.	Portrait	Name (Birth–Death)	Tenure			Ref(s)
No.	Portrait	Name (Birth–Death)	Start	End	Duration	Ref(s)
158		Arthur; Yager (1848–1934)	March 2, 1917	May 15, 1921	4 years, 74 days	
159		José; E. Benedicto; Interim (1880–1924)	May 15, 1921	July 30, 1921	76 days	
160		E. Mont; Reily (1866–1954)	July 30, 1921	February 16, 1923	1 year, 201 days	
161		Juan; B. Huyke; Interim (1880–1961)	February 16, 1923	April 1, 1923	44 days	
162		Horace M. Towner (1855–1937)	April 1, 1923	September 29, 1929	6 years, 181 days	
163		James; R. Beverley; Interim (1894–1967)	September 29, 1929	October 7, 1929	8 days	
164		Theodore; Roosevelt Jr. (1887–1954)	October 7, 1929	January 30, 1932	2 years, 115 days	
165		James; R. Beverley; Interim (1894–1967)	January 30, 1932	July 3, 1933	1 year, 154 days	
166		Robert; H. Gore (1887–1972)	July 3, 1933	January 11, 1934	192 days	
167		Benjamin; J. Horton (1873–1963)	January 11, 1934	February 5, 1934	25 days	
168		Blanton; C. Winship (1869–1947)	February 5, 1934	June 25, 1939	5 years, 140 days	
169		José; E. Colom; Interim (1889–1973)	June 25, 1939	September 11, 1939	78 days	
170		William; D. Leahy (1875–1959)	September 11, 1939	November 28, 1940	1 year, 78 days	
171		José; M. Gallardo; Interim (1897–1976)	November 28, 1940	February 3, 1941	67 days	
172		Guy; J. Swope (1892–1969)	February 3, 1941	July 24, 1941	171 days	
173		José; M. Gallardo; Interim (1897–1976)	July 24, 1941	September 19, 1941	57 days	
174		Rexford; G. Tugwell (1891–1979)	September 19, 1941	September 2, 1946	4 years, 348 days	
175		Jesús; T. Piñero (1897–1952)	September 2, 1946	January 2, 1949	2 years, 122 days	
176 (Note: The continuous tenure of Luis Muñoz Marín was authorized under the Jones–Shafroth Act of 1917 and the Elective Governor Act of 1947 from January 2, 1949 to July 25, 1952, and under the Constitution of Puerto Rico from July 25, 1952 to January 2, 1965. Muñoz Marín became the first popularly elected governor of Puerto Rico through the 1948 Puerto Rican general election.)		Luis; Muñoz; Marín (1898–1980)	January 2, 1949	January 2, 1953	4 years	

=== Commonwealth of Puerto Rico (1952–present) ===
==== Constitution of Puerto Rico (1952–present) ====
In 1952, the Constitution of Puerto Rico established the Commonwealth of Puerto Rico and its government. With its ratification, the full authority and responsibility for the local administration of Puerto Rico was vested in the residents of Puerto Rico, resulting in complete self-governance within the archipelago and island as an unincorporated territory under the sovereign federal jurisdiction of the United States.

Elected to unlimited four-year terms through popular vote by the residents of Puerto Rico, the governor is the head of the executive branch of the government of Puerto Rico and the commander-in-chief of the National Guard of Puerto Rico. The incumbent governor is Jenniffer González, who was elected on November 5, 2024, and sworn in on January 2, 2025.

Puerto Rico political affiliation
New Progressive Party (PNP) (8)
Popular Democratic Party (PPD) (7)

United States political affiliation
Democratic Party (D) (10)
Republican Party (R) (4)
Independent (I) (1)

No.	Portrait (Note: Official portrait or formal photo as Governor of Puerto Rico or the preceding role with the symbols of Puerto Rico or the United States.)	Name (Note: Most commonly used name.) (Birth–Death)	Election	Term of office			Puerto Rico political party	United States political party
No.	Portrait	Name (Birth–Death)	Election	Took office	Left office	Time in office (end reason)	Puerto Rico political party	United States political party
176		Luis; Muñoz; Marín (1898–1980)	1952	January 2, 1953	January 2, 1957	12 years (did not seek reelection)	Popular Democratic	Independent (Note: Trías Monge (1995) "Aunque se le percibía como Demócrata e influía decisivamente en las gestiones del Partido Demócrata de Puerto Rico, Muñoz Marín nunca se afilió formalmente a ese partido ni participó en actividad alguna de los partidos políticos estadounidenses.")
176		Luis; Muñoz; Marín (1898–1980)	1956	January 2, 1957	January 2, 1961	12 years (did not seek reelection)	Popular Democratic	Independent
176		Luis; Muñoz; Marín (1898–1980)	1960	January 2, 1961	January 2, 1965	12 years (did not seek reelection)	Popular Democratic	Independent
177		Roberto; Sánchez; Vilella (1913–1997)	1964	January 2, 1965	January 2, 1969	4 years (lost reelection)	Popular Democratic	Democratic (Note: Metro (2012) "Desde la presidencia de Lyndon B. Johnson y la gobernación de Roberto Sánchez Vilella, no teníamos un presidente demócrata en Washington y un gobernador demócrata en San Juan.")
178		Luis A. Ferré (1904–2003)	1968	January 2, 1969	January 2, 1973	4 years (lost reelection)	New Progressive	Republican (Note: Fernós (2003) "[...]su dirigente Don Luis A. Ferré, presidente del Partido Republicano en Puerto Rico.")
179		Rafael; Hernández; Colón (1936–2019)	1972	January 2, 1973	January 2, 1977	4 years (lost reelection)	Popular Democratic	Democratic (Note: Montalvo (2012) "Carlos Romero Barceló y Rafael Hernández Colón son de partidos contrarios en la Isla, pero demócratas en la política estadounidense.")
180		Carlos; Romero; Barceló (1932–2021)	1976	January 2, 1977	January 2, 1981	8 years (lost reelection)	New Progressive	Democratic
180		Carlos; Romero; Barceló (1932–2021)	1980	January 2, 1981	January 2, 1985	8 years (lost reelection)	New Progressive	Democratic
181		Rafael; Hernández; Colón (1936–2019)	1984	January 2, 1985	January 2, 1989	8 years (did not seek reelection)	Popular Democratic	Democratic
181		Rafael; Hernández; Colón (1936–2019)	1988	January 2, 1989	January 2, 1993	8 years (did not seek reelection)	Popular Democratic	Democratic
182		Pedro; Rosselló (b. 1944)	1992	January 2, 1993	January 2, 1997	8 years (did not seek reelection)	New Progressive	Democratic
182		Pedro; Rosselló (b. 1944)	1996	January 2, 1997	January 2, 2001	8 years (did not seek reelection)	New Progressive	Democratic
183		Sila; María; Calderón (b. 1942)	2000	January 2, 2001	January 2, 2005	4 years (did not seek reelection)	Popular Democratic	Democratic (Note: Castilla y León. "[Calderón] pertenece al Partido Popular Democrático de Puerto Rico y al Partido Demócrata de Estados Unidos.")
184		Aníbal; Acevedo; Vilá (b. 1962)	2004	January 2, 2005	January 2, 2009	4 years (lost reelection)	Popular Democratic	Democratic (Note: DARN (2011) "[Acevedo Vilá] was an active member of the National Governors Association, the Southern Governors Association and the Democratic Governors Association.")
185		Luis; Fortuño (b. 1960)	2008	January 2, 2009	January 2, 2013	4 years (lost reelection)	New Progressive	Republican
186		Alejandro; García; Padilla (b. 1971)	2012	January 2, 2013	January 2, 2017	4 years (did not seek reelection)	Popular Democratic	Democratic (Note: Varela (2013) "[...] Governor Alejandro Padilla, a Democrat [...]")
187		Ricardo; Rosselló (b. 1979)	2016	January 2, 2017	August 2, 2019	2 years, 212 days (resigned) (Note: Rosselló resigned from office due to the Telegramgate scandal.)	New Progressive	Democratic
– (Note: The de facto tenure of Pedro Pierluisi from August 2 to August 7, 2019 is not statistically counted, as he served unconstitutionally. Before resigning from office, Ricardo Rosselló named Pierluisi as Secretary of State, with the intention of making him his successor, as the state secretary is the first official in the gubernatorial line of succession. Pierluisi was sworn in as governor after Rosselló’s resignation. However, his tenure only lasted five days, as the Supreme Court ruled that his assumption of the office was unconstitutional because his nomination as state secretary was never confirmed by the Legislative Assembly. He was succeeded by the next official in the gubernatorial line of succession, Secretary of Justice Wanda Vázquez Garced, who became the first governor to serve through constitutional appointment.)		Pedro; Pierluisi; De facto (b. 1959)	None (Note: As de facto Secretary of State, Pedro Pierluisi succeeded to the office following the resignation of Ricardo Rosselló. Shortly thereafter, the Supreme Court of Puerto Rico ruled that his assumption of the office was unconstitutional because his nomination as Secretary of State was never confirmed by the Legislative Assembly of Puerto Rico. He was succeeded by the next official in the gubernatorial line of succession, Secretary of Justice Wanda Vázquez Garced, who became the first governor to serve through constitutional appointment.)	August 2, 2019	August 7, 2019	5 days (judicial removal)	New Progressive	Democratic
188		Wanda; Vázquez; Appointment (b. 1960)	None (Note: As Secretary of Justice, Wanda Vázquez Garced succeeded to the office through constitutional appointment following the resignation of Ricardo Rosselló and the Supreme Court of Puerto Rico's ruling that Pedro Pierluisi's succession was invalid because he was not confirmed by the Legislative Assembly of Puerto Rico as Secretary of State, which is followed by the Secretary of Justice in the gubernatorial line of succession.)	August 7, 2019	January 2, 2021	1 year, 148 days (lost nomination)	New Progressive	Republican
189		Pedro; Pierluisi (b. 1959)	2020	January 2, 2021	January 2, 2025	4 years (lost renomination)	New Progressive	Democratic
190		Jenniffer; González (b. 1976)	2024	January 2, 2025	Incumbent	1 year, 251 days	New Progressive	Republican

== See also ==
- First ladies and gentlemen of Puerto Rico
- Resident commissioner of Puerto Rico
- History of Puerto Rico
- Politics of Puerto Rico
- List of Legislative Assemblies of Puerto Rico
