= Santiago R. Palmer =

Puerto Rican politician

Mayor of Mayagüez, Puerto Rico
- In office August 11, 1898 – December 11, 1898
- Preceded by: Eliseo Font y Guillot
- Succeeded by: Diego García St. Laurent

Member of the House of Delegates from the Humacao district
- In office January 12, 1903 – January 9, 1905

Member of the House of Delegates from the Arecibo district
- In office January 9, 1905 – March 31, 1906 (died in office)

Personal details
- Born: Santiago Rosendo Palmer Irizarry; February 25, 1844 San Germán, Puerto Rico
- Died: March 31, 1906 (aged 62) San Juan, Puerto Rico
- Party: Union Party
- Spouse: Catalina Augusta Romaguera Ávila
- Parent(s): Gaspar Palmer; Juana Antonia Irizarry
- Occupation: politician, journalist

Santiago Rosendo Palmer Irizarry (February 25, 1844 – March 31, 1906) was a prominent Puerto Rican writer and politician.

== Biography ==
He was born in San Germán, Puerto Rico. He attended his school years in the classrooms of his hometown and later at the Royal Academy of Good Letters. He worked as a clerk (escribano) in the notaries of San Germán, Coamo and Mayagüez, and later in 1882 was appointed as formal Public Notary in Añasco and San Juan.

A supporter of autonomy for Puerto Rico, Santiago R. Palmer contributed to the foundation of the Liberal Reform Party in 1870. He was victim of persecution by the Spanish government authorities, being imprisoned in 1887 with Baldorioty and other Autonomistas.

During the short period of autonomy that Puerto Rico enjoyed between March and July 1898, he was a Representative to the Insular Chamber for Mayagüez.

After the American invasion of Puerto Rico Santiago R. Palmer is elected mayor of Mayagüez and in that position he created a new municipal police force. During the American military government he belonged to the "Advisory Board" of General George Davis. He was vice president and later president of the newly created Federal Party and also later helped to found the successor Union Party of Puerto Rico. From 1903 he was a Representative to the House of Delegates until his death in San Juan on March 31, 1906. He was buried at Santa María Magdalena de Pazzis Cemetery.

== Freemasonry ==
Santiago R. Palmer helped founding the first official national lodge of Puerto Rico: the Logia Adelphia in Mayagüez on September 20, 1885. Also he was one of the first and most prominent members of the Sovereign Grand Lodge of Free and Accepted Masons of Puerto Rico, of which he was the first Grand Master.

== Recognitions ==
=== Monuments ===
- The San Germán Convention Center wears its name.
- The Main Public Square of Caguas, Puerto Rico also bears his name.
- A street in Downtown Mayagüez from former Eugenio María de Hostos High School building eastward to Oriente Street.

=== Schools ===
- A public High School and a segunda unidad (elementary school) in Camuy, Puerto Rico
- A former elementary public school in Salinas, Puerto Rico (now closed).
- Another former elementary public school in Las Marías, Puerto Rico (now closed)

== Bibliography ==
- Reynal, V. (1992) "Diccionario de hombres ilustres de Puerto Rico y de hechos históricos", Editorial Edil, Río Piedras, PR.(in Spanish)
