= Ustariz =

Ustariz is a surname. Notable people with the surname include:

- Juan Andrés de Ustariz (1656–1718), Royal Governor of Chile
- Mariano Eduardo de Rivero y Ustáriz (1798–1857), Peruvian scientist
- Miguel Antonio de Ustáriz (died 1792), governor of Puerto Rico
- Rosario Ustáriz Borra (1927–2009), Spanish writer and poet
