= Captaincy General of Puerto Rico =

1580–1898 Spanish possession in the Caribbean

Captaincy General of Puerto Rico Capitanía General de Puerto Rico (Spanish)
- 1582–1898
- Flag Coat of arms
- Motto: "JOANNES EST NOMEN EJUS" "John is his name"
- Anthem: Anthem of Riego (1873-1874) Royal anthem: (1770-1873, 1874-1898) Marcha Real (Spanish) (English: "Royal March")
- Seal

- Viceroyalty of New Spain in 1794, with the Captaincy General of Puerto Rico shown in light pink
- Status: Captaincy General; Autonomous Province
- Capital: San Juan
- Official languages: Spanish
- Religion: Roman Catholicism
- Demonyms: Spaniard, Puerto Rican
- Government: Monarchy (1582–1872, 1875–1898); Federal semi-presidential republic (1873–1874)
- King
  - 1580-1598: Philip II
  - 1759-1788: Charles III
  - 1886-1898: Alfonso XIII; Maria Christina of Austria (Regent)
- Captain General
  - 1582: Diego Menéndez de Valdés (first)
  - 1898: Ángel Rivero Méndez (last)
- Legislature: None
- Historical era: Early modern Europe
  - Creation: 1582
  - First Spanish Republic: 11 February 1873– 29 December 1874
  - Invasion by the United States: 25 July 1898
  - Withdrawal of Spanish forces: 18 October 1898
- Currency: Spanish real, Puerto Rican peso
- ISO 3166 code: PR
Preceded by	Succeeded by
New Spain	Military Government of Porto Rico

The Captaincy General of Puerto Rico (Spanish: Capitanía General de Puerto Rico) was an administrative district of the Spanish Empire, created in 1582 to provide better military management of the main island of Puerto Rico, previously under the rule of a governor of Puerto Rico, jurisdiction of the Audiencia of Santo Domingo, and authority of the Viceroyalty of New Spain. Its creation was part of the, ultimately futile, Habsburg attempt in the late 16th century to prevent incursion into the Caribbean by competing European world powers. The institution lasted until 1898 in Puerto Rico, when an autonomous provincial government, headed by a governor-general and an insular parliament, was instituted months before Spain ceded Puerto Rico to the United States in 1898 following defeat in the Spanish–American War.

== History ==
=== Antecedents ===
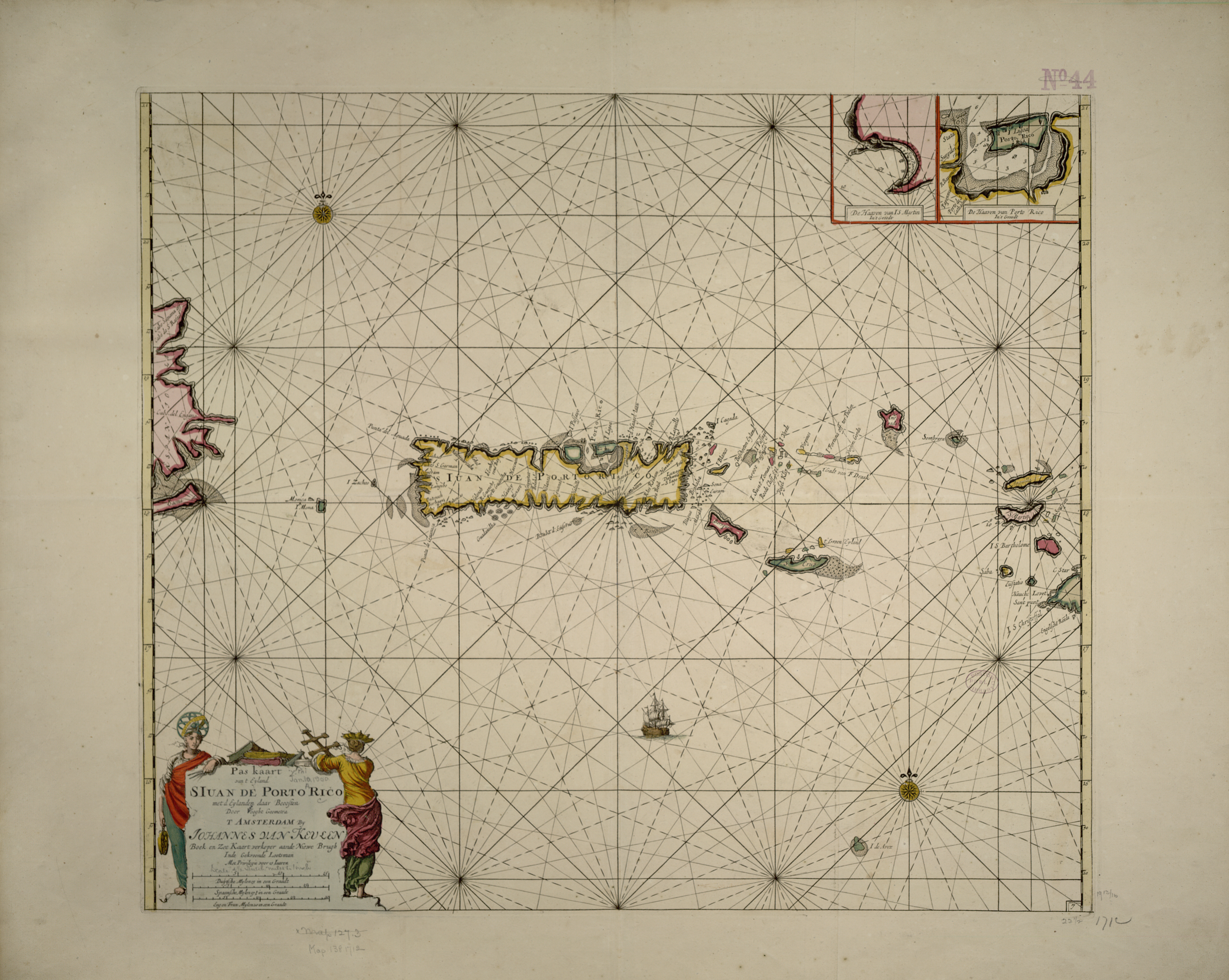
Map of Puerto Rico (1712)

In 1508 Juan Ponce de León was commissioned by the Crown to carry out the initial colonization of Puerto Rico. After successfully founding the city of Caparra (on the site of today's Guaynabo), he was appointed as its first governor in 1509 by the regent of Castile, Ferdinand V. Since Christopher Columbus's death in 1506, the Spanish Crown had refused to recognize his heirs' right to appoint governors of the West Indies, but in 1511 the Council of Castile ruled in Diego Colón's favor. As a result, Ponce de León lost his position and left the island, not wishing to serve under Colón. However, Ponce de León returned to the island as governor from 1515 to 1519.

The Columbus family appointed governors in Puerto Rico from then until 1536, when Diego's son, Luis Colón sold the rights to govern the Indies to the Crown. In 1511, when Diego Colón had won the right to appoint governors, the first diocese was established on the island under the auspices of the Archdiocese of Seville. (This diocese was later transferred in 1546 to oversight by the newly elevated Archdiocese of Santo Domingo. The Puerto Rico Diocese also supervised the church activities in the Province of Guayana in Venezuela from the 16th to 18th centuries.)

From 1536 to 1545, the island was overseen by the president of the Audiencia of Santo Domingo, who was also Captain General of the Caribbean. The island territory was administered locally, not as one unit, but by the alcaldes ordinarios of the two municipalities of the island, San Juan (a reconstituted Caparra) and San Germán. These men were elected annually by the cabildos from among the local settler population. (The island was split along the Camuy and Jacaguas rivers.) Since most of the settlers did not have the training to become governors, the system proved ineffective. The island's Spanish residents complained to the Crown.

Starting in 1545 governors with legal training (gobernadores letrados) were appointed by either the crown or the Santo Domingo Audiencia. Filling the highest judicial office on the island, the governors heard cases in the first instance in their immediate districts, and in appeal from the regional alcaldes. The next court of appeal was the Audiencia in Santo Domingo. In addition to being the highest administrative office on the island, governors also derived power from their right to annually appoint two of the four regidores of the cabildos on the island. As with all other Spanish political officials, governors were subject to the juicio de residencia, an official review of their time in office. Since governors were the king's highest representative on the island, they had oversight over the Church because of the right of patronage (real patronato) that the monarchs of Spain had in the Americas. They controlled the construction and maintenance of church buildings, paid the salaries of the clergy, and ensured that only Papal bulls and encyclicals approved by the Council of the Indies were published on the island.

Due to Spain's growing military conflicts with other European powers, both in Europe and in the New World, the Crown added the office of captain general to the governor in 1580. Following this, mostly military men, rather than lawyers, were appointed as governors-captains general. They were assisted by a legal adviser (asesor) in their judicial and administrative duties.

=== Establishment ===
Spain considered Puerto Rico as vital strategically as the gateway to the Caribbean, even as it was economically marginal. It was described as "the key to the Indies." Given the sea currents and wind patterns of the Atlantic, Puerto Rico was usually the first port of call for ships arriving from Europe. Despite this, or perhaps because of its negligible economic importance, the Spanish took a long time to build up the island's defenses. The first fortified building was the Ponce de León family home (today the Casa Blanca), which defensive features were added in the 1520s. In the next decade construction began on the first true fort, La Fortaleza, at the entrance of the bay. By 1539 construction began of a full defensive complex around San Juan, which included Forts San Felipe del Morro, San Cristóbal, and San Gerónimo. On the other side of the island, San Germán was left practically defenseless, and was easy prey to French attacks throughout the century from its colonies in the Caribbean.

With the creation of the Captaincy General in 1582, Governor-Captain General Diego Menéndez de Valdés (1582–1593) continued to strengthen defenses around San Juan. To fund the construction and an enlarged garrison, an annual subsidy, the situado, was ordered from the royal coffers in New Spain, although for the next two centuries, the situado often did not reach Puerto Rico. The number of permanent soldiers under Menéndez de Valdés went from fifty to just over two hundred, and was later raised to over four hundred in 1596, the number at which it would stay for the next century. The improvements to the city's defenses proved to be ready by the time they faced their first major challenge, an assault by a 27-ship fleet led by Francis Drake. The island would also serve as an important bastion in Spain's struggles against the piracy practiced by its rivals in the Caribbean; this continued to plague Spain during the next two centuries. Many Puerto Ricans also became Spanish privateers, who operated against the British, French and Dutch possessions in the area; the most famous privateer of these men was Miguel Henríquez. During these periods of shifting formal and informal conflict, trading in contraband proved to be a crucial element of the local economy, as was common in many peripheral areas of Spanish America. It resulted in the siphoning off to foreign powers of most of the money that reached the island as the situado.

To supplement the inadequate number of regular soldiers, local militias (milicias urbanas) were organized in each of the islands five districts (partidos) outside of the capital: San Germán, Arecibo, Aguada, Coamo, Loíza and Ponce. The militia men were not regularly paid nor were they armed by the government. Their weapons consisted of farm implements: machetes, improvised wooden lances and regular knives, but the governors-captains general usually attested to their courage. Each partido was overseen by a teniente a guerra, a deputy of the captain general.

=== 18th century and the Bourbon Reforms ===
Shaken by the losses of the Seven Years' War, in particular the capture of Havana by the British in 1762, Charles III sent several officials to the Caribbean to review the defenses of the area. Alejandro O'Reilly was sent to Puerto Rico in 1765. O'Reilly recommended many reforms, several of which were implemented: upgrading the fortifications in San Juan; introducing direct, regular pay for the soldiers on the island (up until then, soldiers had been paid by their commanding officers); and professionalizing the militias. He also undertook a complete census of the island (it recorded 44,883 residents, of which 5,037 were enslaved; and 24 towns or villages in the island). In the course of this, he came to realize the importance of contraband in the local economy.

To reverse this, O'Reilly recommended developing the legal economy, in particular agriculture, which he found vastly untapped. He wanted to return uncultivated land to the crown and then grant it to persons willing to farm it. In 1784 an intendancy was created in Puerto Rico but, unlike the one created in Cuba, the office was not separated from the governorship. O'Reilly's reforms were most successful in the military sphere. He was able to achieve little economic change, unlike that which took place in neighboring Cuba. The island's economy remained tied to the situado subsidy and foreign trade, something which proved harmful during the interruption in trade caused by the Napoleonic Wars.

=== Early 19th century: revolutions and setbacks ===
The early 19th century presented the dual challenge of Spain suffering invasion by French forces and revolt among its colonies in the Americas. The Peninsular War and the Spanish American wars of independence spurred great innovation in Puerto Rico's government. Puerto Rico's sea ties to Venezuela, due to sailing patterns which made the island the closest port of call from Venezuela, played significantly in this period. The juntas which were established in Venezuela in 1810 corresponded with the cabildos of Puerto Rico. The San Juan cabildo turned down the invitation from the Caracas junta to establish a junta on the island, but the San Germán cabildo always maintained the right to self-rule, should Spain be permanently lost to the French. Some individual Puerto Ricans, such as Antonio Valero de Bernabé, later chose to join the struggle for independence going on in the South American mainland.

In response to the junta movement gathering strength on the mainland, the peninsular government gave Governor Salvador Meléndez extraordinary powers to deal with any revolt on the island. At the same time, many royalist refugees from Venezuela began arriving in Puerto Rico. The island also served as a point of departure for troops on their way to Venezuela, such as those under Domingo de Monteverde and Pablo Morillo.

As the government in opposition to the French began to take shape in the form of a Supreme Central Junta, it recognized the overseas possessions as integral parts of the Spanish nation. In 1809 it invited them to send delegates to the Junta. This initiated a period of elections in the Captaincy General which were of ever-increasing representation, culminating in the constitutional periods of 1812-1814 and 1820-1823. The first elections were to be carried out by the cabildos, of which there were five on the island by this time: San Juan, San Germán, Aguada, Arecibo and Coamo. They elected as Puerto Rico's representative, the native criollo Ramón Power y Giralt, but before he could leave for Spain, the Supreme Junta had dissolved itself. Before it had done so, the Junta had sent the call out to convene the Cortes of Cádiz – which served as a parliamentary Regency after Ferdinand VII was deposed. The cabildos elected Power as the island's representative in the Cortes.

Power had a very active term in the Cortes. He quickly had the Cortes suspend the governor of Puerto Rico's extraordinary powers, and he also secured separation of the office of the intendant from that of the governor-captain general. The highlight of his legislative activity was the Ley Power (the Power Act), which introduced many administrative and economic reforms in Puerto Rico, many of which survived Ferdinand VII's abolition of the Spanish Constitution of 1812 and the Cortes. The Spanish Constitution also introduced local government to Puerto Rico. Many more popularly elected cabildos were introduced to the island. A local administrative and legislative board was also elected, the Diputación Provincial.

After the King of Spain restored traditional government, he sought to maintain and reward the loyalty of Puerto Ricans by granting the island a limited form of the long-sought free trade. The Royal Decree of Graces of 1815 granted many of the economic requests that Power and the island cabildos had requested since 1810. In the long term, the Decree had very beneficial economic effects. It encouraged the immigration of Europeans who were not of Spanish origin to the island, started the growth of the sugar industry (although this resulted in increasing importation of slaves), and a series of competent intendants set the island's government finances on good standing for decades to come.

During the second constitutional period after the Riego Revolt, new deputies to the Cortes were elected by the island's population, the Diputación Provincial met again. An important change from the first period was that the captaincy general and the governorship were separated. Francisco González de Linares, a long-time Venezuelan resident who had fled after collapse of its royalist government, was appointed governor. Pablo Morillo's successor as head of the royalist forces in Venezuela, Miguel de la Torre, was appointed captain general.

After Ferdinand VII's second abolition of the Constitution, La Torre was made joint governor and captain general, with extraordinary powers to suppress any potential revolt. He would hold the office of captain general for more than fifteen years. Despite La Torre's wariness of the island's liberal tendencies, his long administration was key to the development of large-scale sugar production on the island. This scale of commodity-crop agriculture had been developed decades earlier in Cuba. Figures from the period show the growth in this period. In 1820, 17,000 tons of sugar were produced and 5.8 percent of the land was under any type of cultivation. By 1897, Puerto Rico produced 62,000 tons of sugar and had 14.3 percent of its land devoted to agriculture. The small landholdings, which had been traditional since the 16th century, were purchased to develop large plantations.

After sugar, coffee was the second most important crop. In 1818, 70 million pounds of coffee were produced, a figure which grew to 130 million pounds by 1830. The increased agricultural activity was done partly by new slave labor, workers imported from other Caribbean islands. In 1817 Spain had signed a treaty with Britain pledging to outlaw Spanish involvement in the slave trade, but it was not seriously enforced until after 1845. In Puerto Rico, however, slaves made up only 11.5 to 14 percent of the work force, a much lower proportion compared to other Caribbean islands of the time. In judicial matters, Puerto Rico was granted its own audiencia from 1832 to 1853. Previously appeals had been heard by the former Audiencia of Santo Domingo, now resident in Cuba.

=== Mid-Century: Slow progress towards autonomy ===
The death of Ferdinand VII brought about new changes. Regent María Cristina reconvened the Cortes, in its traditional form, and Puerto Rico sent several deputies, all liberals. In 1836, Constitutional government was reestablished in Spain. This government, despite its liberal tendencies, viewed the overseas territories as colonies to be governed by special laws. The democratic institutions, such as the Diputación Provincial and the cabildos, established by the 1812 Constitution were removed, and the extraordinary powers granted to the governor maintained. The new Constitution of 1837 ratified Puerto Rico's demoted status. Worse still the "special laws" by which the overseas areas were to be governed, were not drafted until three decades later, when a special Junta Informativa de Reformas de Ultramar (Overseas Informative Reform Board), with representatives from Cuba and Puerto Rico, was convened in 1865. Even then its proposals were never made into laws.

The Gloriosa Revolt of 1868, which removed Queen Isabel II from power, initially reaffirmed the right of Puerto Rico's residents to participate in the Spanish government. The island elected seven deputies to the Cortes, the Diputación Provincial once again was formed, and plans were made to draw up the laws which would grant the island autonomy. But three factors nullified this progress. First the government in Spain was too unstable (reflected in the fact that between 1871 and 1874 Puerto Rico had five governors). Second the short-lived revolt of Lares proved to authorities that the situation in Puerto Rico was not as calm as it might seem. Finally and most seriously, the Lares revolt coincided with the Ten Years' War in Cuba, which made the government apprehensive of granting autonomy to either of the Caribbean islands. In 1875, the Bourbons were restored when the Spanish government offered the throne to Alfonso XII. Limited elections, which granted the franchise only to people with large amounts of property, were allowed in Puerto Rico. True political parties also emerged in this period, the Partido Liberal Reformista, which promoted autonomy for the island, and the Partido Liberal Conservador, which pushed for the island's greater integration into the political system of Spain.

The issue of autonomy came to a head in 1895 with the start of the Cuban War of Independence. The Overseas Minister, with approval from the Prime Minister, took the extra-constitutional step in 1897 of writing the Constitución Autonómica (Autonomic Charter), the new measures which granted autonomy to the Caribbean islands. Given the urgency of the movement, the government approved this unusual measure. The new government was to consist of "an Island Parliament, divided into two chambers and one Governor-General, representative of the Metropolis, who will carry out his duties in its name, the supreme Authority." Elections for the parliament and the municipal councils occurred in early 1898. The island legislature first met in July, only eight days before the US invasion of the island. Following Spain's defeat, the US annexed Puerto Rico as a territory.

== Symbols ==
Coat of Arms (1511)

Coat of Arms (1767)

Coat of Arms (1873)

Flag (1873)

== See also ==
- History of Puerto Rico
- Military history of Puerto Rico
- Real Audiencia of Santo Domingo
- List of governors of Puerto Rico

== Bibliography ==
- Brau, Salvador. La Colonización de Puerto Rico: Desde el descubrimiento de la Isla hasta la reversión a la corona española de los privilegios de Colón. San Juan: Instituto de Cultura Puertorriqueña, 1969.
- Morales Carrión, Arturo, ed. Puerto Rico: A Political and Cultural History. New York: W. W. Norton & Co., 1983. ISBN 0-393-30193-1
- Navarro García, Jesús Raúl. Puerto Rico a la sombra de la independencia continental, 1815-1840. Seville-San Juan: CEAPRC/CSIC, 1999. ISBN 1-879308-34-7
- Picó, Fernando. Puerto Rico: A Panorama of Its People. Princeton: Markus Wiener Publishers, 2006. ISBN 1-55876-371-6
