= Autonomy Charter of Puerto Rico =

Statute of Autonomy granted by Spain to Puerto Rico in 1897

Coat of Arms of Puerto Rico

The Autonomy Charter of Puerto Rico was, alongside the Autonomy Charter of Cuba, the first Statute of Autonomy granted by Spain to a province, in particular to the Captaincy General of Puerto Rico. It authorized the formation of an autonomous government.

It was granted during the fourth term of the liberal Práxedes Mateo Sagasta (1897-99) as Prime Minister, by Royal Decree signed on November 25, 1897, by Queen Regent Maria Christina of Austria on behalf of her son, Alfonso XIII of Spain. It was published in the Gaceta de Madrid on November 28, 1897.

Its promulgation was accompanied by the establishment of universal male suffrage in all overseas provinces.

== Content of the Charter ==
The Charter consisted of 70 articles divided into 9 titles, plus 3 additional articles and 2 transitional articles.

An Insular Parliament was established, divided into a House of Representatives (32 members elected every five years; one for every 25,000 inhabitants) and a Board of Directors (eight elected in half every five years and seven appointed for life), with jurisdiction to regulate all local affairs and authority over matters of Grace and Justice, Government, Finance, and Development. Meanwhile, the Cortes and the Spanish executive reserved jurisdiction over matters relating to the State, Navy, and War. Its representative would be a Governor General, elected by the King upon the nomination of the Cortes, who would exercise Supreme Authority on behalf of the Metropolis. The power to legislate would rest with the insular Chambers and the Governor General.

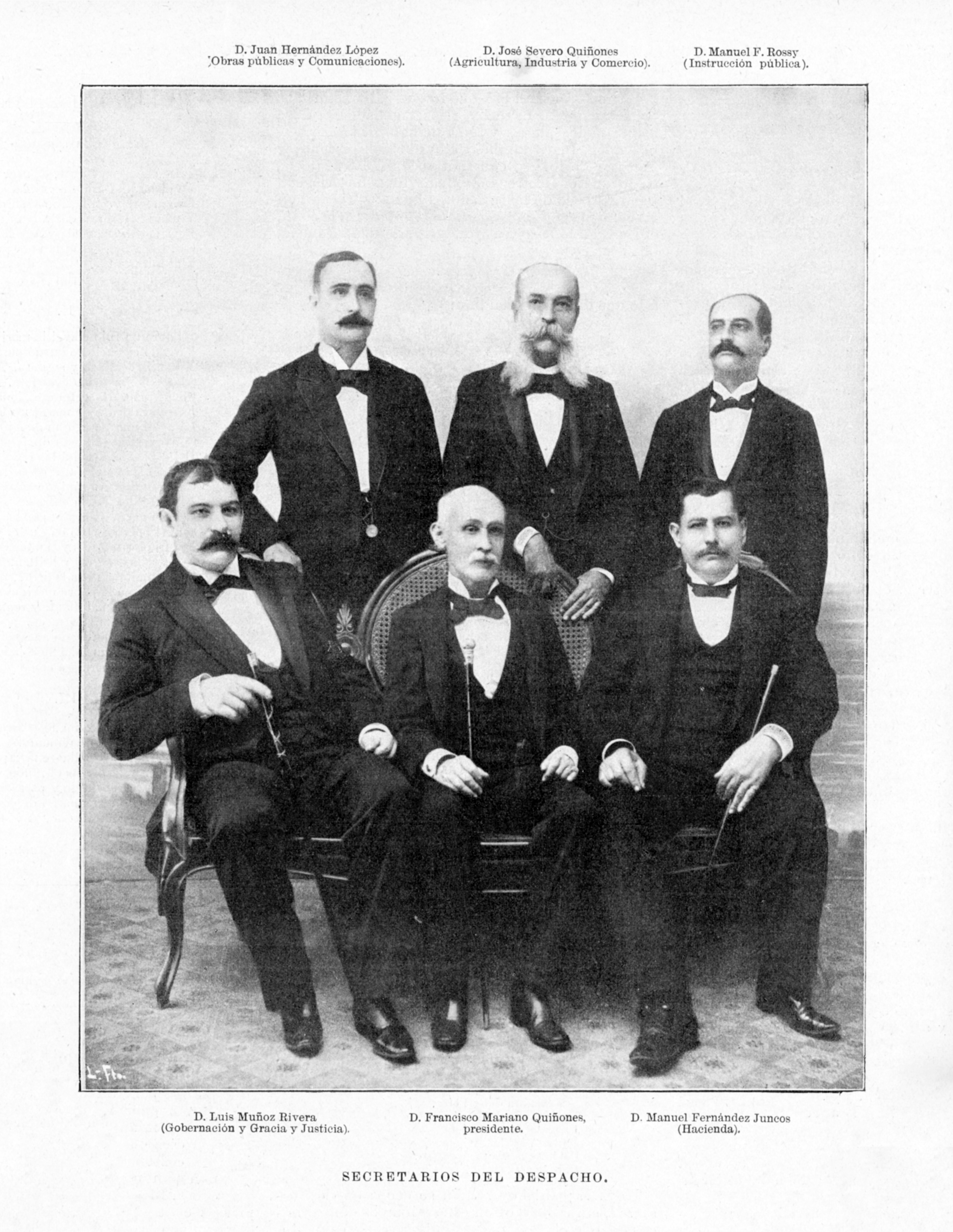
Executive secretaries appointed by the governor during the first autonomous government, 1898

The island government, or Office, would be composed of five secretariats, responsible to Parliament: those of Grace and Justice, Finance, Public Instruction, Public Works and Communications, and Agriculture, Industry, and Commerce. Furthermore, the Provincial Council of Puerto Rico and the municipalities would be maintained, and the island would elect 16 deputies and 3 senators to the Spanish Parliament.

The charters of Cuba and Puerto Rico were the most advanced self-government documents of all the European territories in the Caribbean, surpassing the demands of the Autonomist Party and fully comparable to the dominion status granted by the United Kingdom to Canada in 1867.

In addition, the Provincial Council of Puerto Rico and the municipalities would remain, and the island would elect 16 deputies and 3 senators in the Spanish Courts. The Charter came into force on February 10, 1898.

== End of the Autonomy Charter ==
The autonomous system came into effect on February 10, 1898, when the new island government was sworn in before Governor Manuel Macías Casado. Francisco Mariano Quiñones was president; Luis Muñoz Rivera, the leader of the autonomists, was in charge of Grace and Justice; Manuel Fernández Juncos, of Finance; Manuel Rossy Calderón, of Public Education; Juan Hernández López, of Public Works and Communications; and José Severo Quiñones Caro, of Agriculture, Commerce, and Industry.

In March-April 1898, the Legislative Assembly was elected, in which the Liberal Autonomist Union, led by Muñoz Rivera, obtained a large majority. However, the outbreak of the Spanish-American War in April meant that the chambers could barely meet and the Cabinet could not carry out its functions. Parliament was inaugurated on July 17 and began its session the following day, but was interrupted on July 25 by the American invasion of the territory. The Americans did not conquer the island before the armistice of August 12, capturing only 23 of the 78 municipalities. The Spanish Empire rule of Puerto Rico effectively ended on October 18, when the United States assumed sovereignty over the territory, establishing the Military Government of Porto Rico (the spelling "Porto Rico" was officially used by U.S. government until 1932), which operated under the Bureau of Insular Affairs of the United States Department of War. With the Treaty of Paris of December 10, 1898, Spain officially renounced its sovereignty over Puerto Rico.

== See also ==
- History of Puerto Rico
- Political status of Puerto Rico
- Restoration (Spain)
- Spanish–American War
