= Andrés González Muñoz =

Cuban politician (1840 - 1898)

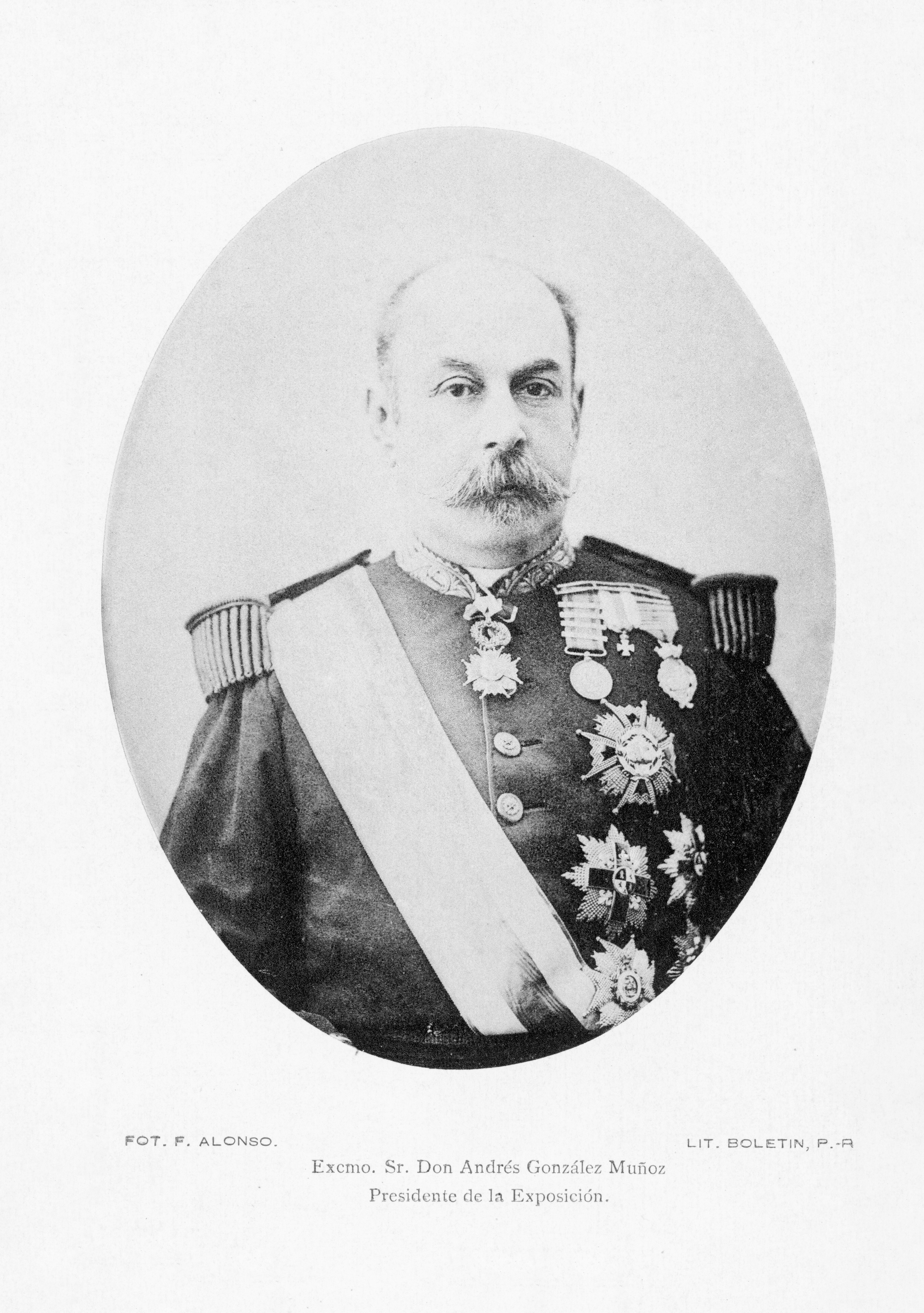

Governor of Puerto Rico
- In office 11 January 1898
- Monarch: Alfonso XIII
- Regent: Maria Christina of Austria
- Prime Minister: Práxedes Mateo Sagasta
- Minister of Overseas: Segismundo Moret
- Preceded by: Ricardo de Ortega y Diez
- Succeeded by: Ricardo de Ortega y Diez

Personal details
- Born: 1840 Santiago de Cuba, Cuba
- Died: January 11, 1898 San Juan, Puerto Rico

Andrés González Muñoz (1840 – January 11, 1898) was a Cuban politician who served briefly as the governor of Puerto Rico in 1898. His father was from Venezuela and his mother was from Santiago de Cuba, the same city that Muñoz was born in. He was born in 1840 in Santiago de Cuba, Captaincy General of Cuba. He graduated in 1862 as a lieutenant from the Segovia Artillery Academy. He was promoted to lieutenant colonel for his service to Spain during the Ten Years' War, then to general after returning to Spain and fighting during the Third Carlist War. In 1895, he was named second corporal of Puerto Rico, which he held for 19 days. Afterwards, during his return to Cuba, he achieved the rank of lieutenant general. In 1898, he was appointed captain general of Puerto Rico to establish the Autonomous Charter. Upon his appointment, he left Spain for San Juan, where he arrived on January 11, 1898. However, only eight hours after the welcoming ceremony, he died of a heart attack. He was buried in the Cathedral of San Juan. Upon his death, Ricardo de Ortega y Diez became governor until Manuel Macías y Casado took over the position.
