= Julio Cervera Baviera =

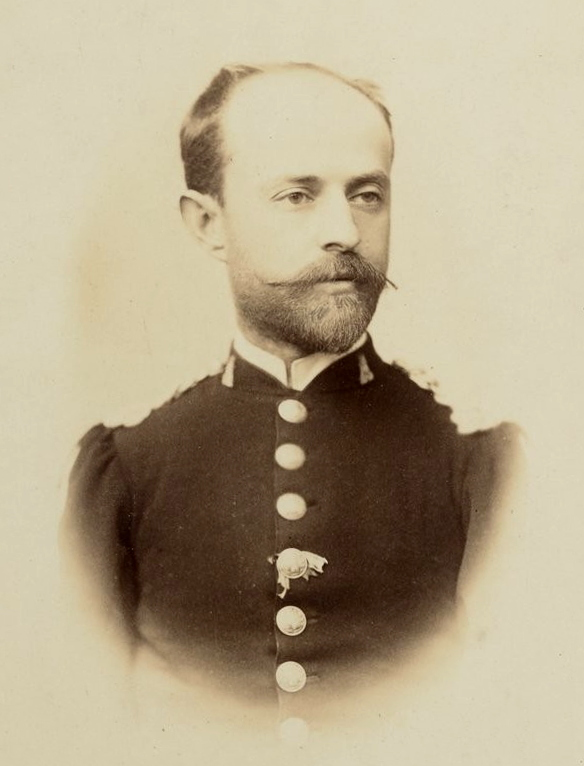
- Julio Cervera Baviera in 1886
- Born: 26 January 1854; Segorbe, Spain
- Died: 24 June 1927 (aged 73); Madrid, Spain
- Occupations: Inventor, military commander, and engineer

Signature
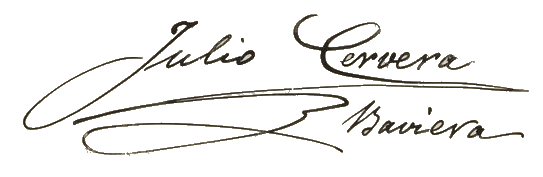

Julio Cervera Baviera (26 January 1854 – 24 June 1927) was a Spanish engineer, educator, explorer, and colonial military commander. He was an early pioneer in the development of radio and authored various scientific and geographic books and articles.

== Education ==
Born in Segorbe, he studied Physical and Natural Sciences at the University of Valencia but abandoned these studies to join the Army. He first graduated from the academy of Cavalry (1875) and then from the Academy of Military Engineers at Guadalajara (1882).

== Work in Africa ==
He traveled to Morocco in 1877 and published a book called Geografía militar de Marruecos in 1884, and the Army commissioned him in 1884 to explore this area once more. He published Expedicion geografico-militar al interior y costas de Marruecos (1885). At the beginning of 1886, Cervera was working in the photoengraving industry in Barcelona. However, in the summer of 1886, under the sponsorship of the Spanish Society of Commercial Geography (Sociedad Española de Geografía Comercial), Cervera, the Arabic interpreter Felipe Rizzo (1823–1908), and biologist and meteorologist Francisco Quiroga Rodríguez (1853–1894) traversed the Spanish colony of Rio de Oro, part of Spanish Sahara, where they made topographical and astronomical observations in a land whose features were barely known at the time to geographers. They traversed the area between Cape Blanc and Cape Bojador, reaching Adrar after a journey of 900 km. It is considered the first scientific expedition in that part of the Sahara. They also signed the treaties of Idjil (near Atar) with the emir of Adrar and Saharawi chiefs.

In 1884, Cervera supervised the construction of a series of blockhouses around Melilla. Between 1888 and 1890, he served as Military attaché in the Embassy of Spain in Tangiers.

== Imprisonment ==
Cervera's work in Spanish Africa earned him the promotion of commander. However, on 19 December 1890 he published a criticism of the Spanish colonial government in Morocco in El Imparcial, and he was arrested after being tried, and incarcerated in the Santa Bárbara at Alicante in 1891. He was released two years later.

After 1894, he served as aide-de-camp to General Manuel Macías y Casado in the latter's assignments as Commander General of Melilla; Captain General of the Canary Islands; Commander-in-Chief of the Seventh Army Corps at Valladolid; and Captain General of Puerto Rico.

== Spanish–American War ==
During the Spanish–American War, he was in charge of defense of Guamaní, a peak that commanded the road between Cayey and Guayama. He was thus involved in the Battle of Guamaní (9 August 1898), and was responsible for repulsing an attack by American troops there.

After the war, he gained notoriety as the author of a pamphlet called La defensa de Puerto Rico, which supported Governor General Manuel Macías y Casado, who had become head of the government of Puerto Rico under the Autonomous Charter created in February 1898 (Puerto Rico soon passed under American control). Its purpose was to support the actions of General Macias before the Spanish public but it ended up criticizing the Puerto Rican volunteers in the Spanish Army. After Spain's defeat against the United States, Spaniards looked for reasons to explain it. Cervera wrote: "I have never seen such a servile, ungrateful country [i.e., Puerto Rico]. ... In twenty-four hours, the people of Puerto Rico went from being fervently Spanish to enthusiastically American. ... They humiliated themselves, giving in to the invader as the slave bows to the powerful lord."

A group of angry young sanjuaneros agreed to challenge Cervera to a duel if the commander did not retract his pamphlet. The young men drew lots for this honor; it fell to José Janer y Soler (his "seconds" [padrinos in Spanish] were Cayetano Coll y Toste y Leonidas Villalón). Cervera's seconds were Colonel Pedro del Pino and Captain Emilio Barrera. The duel never took place, as Cervera explained his intentions in writing the pamphlet, and all parties were satisfied.

== Radio Pioneering ==
In May–June 1899 the Spanish Army sent Cervera to visit Marconi's radiotelegraphic installations on the English Channel to study the Marconi system with the goal of adapting it for the Spanish Military. He began collaborating with Guglielmo Marconi on resolving the engineering problems of a long range wireless communication, obtaining some patents by the end of 1899.

On 22 March 1902 Cervera founded the Spanish Wireless Telegraph and Telephone Corporation. Cervera brought to the Spanish Wireless Telegraph and Telephone Corporation the patents he had obtained in Spain, Belgium, Germany and England. He established the second and third regular radiotelegraph service in the history of the world in 1901 and 1902 by maintaining regular transmissions between Tarifa and Ceuta for three consecutive months, and between Xàbia (Cap de la Nau) and Ibiza (Cap Pelat). This was after Marconi established the radiotelegraphic service between the Isle of Wight and Bournemouth in 1898.

According to the latest research conducted, Julio Cervera developed the radio eleven years before Marconi. It is true that the Italian invented wireless telegraphy before Cervera, but for transmitting signals, not sound. Cervera transmitted the human voice—and not signals—wirelessly between Jávea and Ibiza in 1902, which meant connecting two distant points nearly 85 kilometers. However, fifteen years before Marconi and four years before Julio Cervera, Nikola Tesla had already made several demonstrations and publications of the principles of radio. Following Marconi's patent usurpation, Nikola Tesla took Marconi to court, winning the lawsuit before the U.S. Supreme Court and remaining as the authentic inventor of the radio.

Cervera thus achieved some success in this field, but his radiotelegraphic activities ceased suddenly, the reasons for which are unclear to this day.

== Other activities ==
He also worked as a technical instructor, after being appointed on 27 August 1900, as royal commissary at the Escuela Superior de Artes e Industrias de Madrid. After 8 months he became frustrated with his inability to reform the curriculum, and traveled to Europe and the United States from May 1903, where he became interested in instruction via correspondence. He abandoned his military career, and set up the Internacional Institución Electrotécnica, in Valencia in 1903, one of the first distance education programs in the world. It gave degrees for the careers of mechanical engineer, electrician, and mechanic-electrician.

He published his Enciclopedia científico-practica del ingeniero mecánico electricista, published in 2 editions (1904, 1915). The institution also published a magazine called Electricidad y Mecánica. The institution later renamed itself the Institución de Enseñaza Técnica, and offered two new degrees: agricultural engineering and therapeutic teacher. It also offered a long-distance language learning program by phonograph.

Cervera was also responsible for designing the original Tenerife Tram system. He helped build a tramway system in his native Segorbe.

== Personal life and political life ==
Cervera was a liberal republican. He was also a militant Freemason who founded a masonic lodge in Segorbe. In 1890, he founded, with Felipe de Borbón y Braganza, an order of Masons in Morocco, comprising 12 lodges and 200 masons (the members were Africans, Europeans, Americans). A year later it was integrated with the Spanish G.O. (Gran Oriente).

Cervera was friends with the republican politician Manuel Ruiz Zorrilla. His political views caused him trouble with his superiors and may have been the reason behind some of his failures. In 1891, he ran as Republican candidate to the Cortes for Segorbe, but the military coup prevented him from running or achieving victory. He tried again in 1893 and was about to act as deputy, when electoral rigging prevented this from happening. In 1908, he obtained a seat in the partial elections as candidate of the Partido Republicano Radical for Valencia, but did not win again in 1914, when he represented Xàtiva.

He had married María de los Desamparados Giménez in 1883. They had two girls, Amparo and Pilar, and a boy, who died as a child. With Amparo he spent his last years in Madrid, where he died in 1927.

== Bibliography ==
- Julio Cervera y la telegrafía sin hilos. Ministerio de Defensa y Ministerio de Economía y Competitividad. Madrid 2015.
