= Military Government of Porto Rico =

1898–1900 U.S. territory of Puerto Rico under military administration

Military Government of Porto Rico Gobierno Militar de Puerto Rico (Spanish)
- 1898–1900
- Flag Great Seal
- Motto: E Pluribus Unum "Out of Many, One"
- Anthem: Salve, Columbia "Hail, Columbia"
- Map of Puerto Rico (red) within the Americas
- Status: Unincorporated and unorganized territory of the United States
- Capital: San Juan
- Common languages: Spanish; English
- Religion: Catholicism
- Government: Military governed dependency
- Military governor
  - 1898: John R. Brooke
  - 1898–1899: Guy Vernor Henry
  - 1899–1900: George Whitefield Davis
- History
  - Invasion and annexation by the United States: 25 July 1898
  - Renunciation of sovereignty by Spain under armistice: 12 August 1898
  - Evacuation of Spanish authority and start of United States sovereignty: 18 October 1898
  - Cession from Spain to the United States is agreed under the Treaty of Paris: 10 December 1898
  - Cession from Spain to the United States is proclaimed under a ratified Treaty of Paris: 11 April 1899
  - End of military government and start of civil governance under the Foraker Act: 1 May 1900
Preceded by	Succeeded by
Captaincy General of Puerto Rico	Insular Government of Porto Rico

The Military Government of Porto Rico (Spanish: Gobierno Militar de Puerto Rico), was an unincorporated and unorganized territory of the United States established in Puerto Rico under a provisional military government responsible for administering the archipelago and island after its acquisition during the Spanish–American War in 1898. Created with the transfer of de facto sovereignty from the Spanish Empire to the U.S. on October 18, 1898 and ending with the implementation of civil governance under the Insular Government of Porto Rico on May 1, 1900, it was headed by a military governor acting under the purview of the Chief of Insular Affairs, Secretary of War, and U.S. President.

The Military Government of Porto Rico operated as an unincorporated and unorganized U.S. insular area since the U.S. Constitution applied selectively in the territory, and an organic act granting government powers to the territory was nonexistent. Under it, an Americanization process began in Puerto Rico, including the temporary name change of the island and archipelago from Spanish Puerto Rico to English transliterated Porto Rico, which is also a long-established French, Italian, and Portuguese exonym.

== Creation ==
In 1898, the United States bombarded, invaded, occupied, and annexed the archipelago and island of Puerto Rico during the Spanish–American War. The United States Navy carried out the Bombardment of San Juan, the fortified capital city in northeastern Puerto Rico (today the historic quarter of Old San Juan), on May 12, while the United States Army began the land invasion of the territory through the municipality of Guánica in southwestern Puerto Rico on July 25. After an armistice, a cease-fire agreement, was signed on August 12, the active hostilities between Spain and the United States stopped, with the war officially ending by the signing of the Treaty of Paris on December 10. The armistice and treaty led to Spain ceding Cuba, Puerto Rico, and Guam to the United States and agreed to the American occupation of Manila in the Philippines.

The Spanish Empire rule of Puerto Rico effectively ended on October 18, when the United States assumed sovereignty over the territory, establishing the Military Government of Porto Rico, which operated under the Division of Customs and Insular Affairs of the United States Department of War. From the establishment of the military government in 1898 to the creation of the Insular Government of Porto Rico in 1900, the governor of Puerto Rico was under the purview of the Chief of Insular Affairs, John J. Pershing, the Secretary of War, Elihu Root, and the President of the United States, William McKinley. The three military governors who served in Puerto Rico were Major Generals John R. Brooke (1898), Guy Vernon Henry (1998–1899), and George Whitefield Davis 1899–1900). Brooke and Henry were experienced veterans of the Indian Wars.

=== Timeline ===
==== 1898 ====
- February 15: The USS Maine exploded in Havana harbor.
- May 12: The United States Navy carried out the Bombardment of San Juan, the fortified capital city in northeastern Puerto Rico (today the historic quarter of Old San Juan).
- April 20: President McKinley signed a congressional joint resolution declaring war against Spain.
- July 25: The United States Army began the land invasion of Puerto Rico through the municipality of Guánica in southwestern Puerto Rico.
- August 12: The active hostilities between Spain and the United States stopped after an armistice, a cease-fire agreement, was signed, in which Spain renounced sovereignty over Puerto Rico.
- October 18: The United States acquired sovereignty over Puerto Rico under Governor John R. Brooke, establishing the Military Government of Porto Rico.
- December 10: Spain and the United States signed the Treaty of Paris, agreeing to cede sovereignty of Puerto Rico to the United States.
- April 11: Spain and the United States exchanged ratifications, proclaiming the cession of Puerto Rico to the United States.

==== 1900 ====
- April 12: President McKinley signed the Foraker Act, establishing civil insular government in Puerto Rico, effective on May 1.

== Effects ==
=== United States ===
==== Military administration of overseas territories ====
Prior to the Spanish–American War in 1898, the United States Army was accustomed to the pacification and administration of the Native Americans, but had no experience administering overseas territories. On this regard, Governor Henry stated that "It was an entirely new duty for American Army officers. There was no precedent in the experience of these so suddenly placed in charge of this our first real colony [Puerto Rico], upon which their policy could be based."

=== Puerto Rico ===
Upon the acquisition of Puerto Rico by the United States, the archipelago and island went through an americanization process.

==== Name ====
The name of Puerto Rico was changed. On January 15, 1899, Puerto Rico, the historical Spanish name of the territory, changed to Porto Rico, the English transliteration, which is also a long-established French, Italian, and Portuguese exonym. U.S. Congress reverted the name back to its original form on May 17, 1932.

==== Government ====
All government organisms and services were reorganized. The legislative branch of the local autonomous government of Puerto Rico under the Spanish Empire, the Insular Parliament, was abolished. The five Puerto Rican secretaries in charge of the executive branch under the evacuated Spanish Governor-General, namely the Grace and Justice, Finance, Public Instruction, Public Works and Communications, and Agriculture, Industry, and Commerce secretaries, resigned from their posts after the American restructuring of their respective departments. The Puerto Rican secretaries who replaced them were assigned an American assistant.

==== Currency ====
The currency of Puerto Rico was changed from the Puerto Rican peso to the American dollar, integrating its currency into the U.S. monetary system.

==== Language and education ====
The first proposals to replace Spanish with English as the language taught in schools were introduced. In 1899, U.S. Senator George Frisbie Hoar described Puerto Ricans as an "uneducated, simple-minded and harmless people who were only interested in wine, women, music and dancing" and recommended that Spanish should be abolished in the schools and only English should be taught. Schools became a primary vehicle for americanization, and initially all classes were taught in English, which also made for a large dropout rate.

== See also ==
- History of Puerto Rico
- American imperialism
