= José Lasso (commander) =

Spanish officer (1837–1913)

José Lasso y Pérez
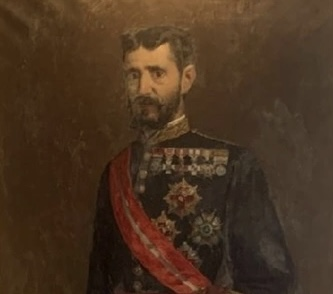
- Born: October 2, 1837; Valverde de Júcar, Spain
- Died: November 30, 1913 (aged 76); Madrid, Spain
- Military career
- Allegiance: (Restoration (Spain)) Spain
- Branch: Spanish Army
- Service years: 1857 – 1913
- Rank: Lieutenant general
- Conflicts: Second French intervention in Mexico; Dominican Restoration War; Glorious Revolution; Ten Years' War; Third Carlist War

Captain General of Valencia
- In office 12 August 1893 – 21 May 1896
- Monarch: Alfonso XIII
- Regent: Maria Christina of Austria
- Prime Minister: Práxedes Mateo Sagasta; Antonio Cánovas del Castillo
- Minister of War: José López Domínguez; Marcelo Azcárraga Palmero
- Preceded by: José Coello de Portugal y Quesada
- Succeeded by: Antonio Moltó y Diaz-Berrio

137th Governor of Puerto Rico
- In office 22 April 1890 – 21 November 1892
- Monarch: Alfonso XIII
- Regent: Maria Christina of Austria
- Prime Minister: Práxedes Mateo Sagasta; Antonio Cánovas del Castillo
- Minister of Overseas: Manuel Becerra y Bermúdez; Antonio María Fabié; Francisco Romero Robledo
- Preceded by: José Pascual Bonanza (as interim)
- Succeeded by: Manuel Delgado y Zuleta (as interim)

José Lasso y Pérez (October 2, 1837 – November 30, 1913) was a Spanish military officer, Captain General of Valencia and Governor of Puerto Rico at the end of the 19th-century. Throughout his military career, he took part in numerous armed conflicts in Europe and Latin America, including the Third Carlist War in Spain, the Ten Years' War in Cuba, and the Dominican Restoration War in the Dominican Republic.

== Biography ==
He was born on October 2, 1837, in Spain. He enlisted in the Spanish Army in 1857, when he was around 20 years old. In 1859, he was promoted to lieutenant.

After being posted to Cuba for a while, in 1861, he was part of the expedition to Mexico that proclaimed the Second Mexican Empire, after which he returned to Cuba. In the Dominican Republic, he joined the Spanish forces in the Dominican Restoration War. For his services, he attained the attained rank of captain. In 1864, he was posted to the Peninsula and participated in the Glorious Revolution of 1868, occupying Santander for the revolutionaries. In 1869, he returned to Cuba. A year earlier, the Ten Years' War had erupted throughout the island. Still serving the Spanish crown, he fought the rebels in Sancti Spiritus, Ciego de Ávila and Morón. In 1871, he was promoted to commander and in 1873 to lieutenant colonel. He then returned to the Peninsula to fight in the Third Carlist War. After the battles of Puente la Reina, Gandesa and Mora de Rubielos he received the rank of colonel. In 1875, after the war ended, he was promoted to brigadier and sent back to Cuba, where in 1877, he was promoted to field marshal. Returning to the Peninsula, in 1883 he was appointed president of the Special Infantry Board in the Superior Consultative War Board.

In 1888, he was promoted to lieutenant general and appointed Captain General of Granada, a position he held until 1890, when he was appointed Governor of Puerto Rico. He resigned from this position in 1893 and was appointed Captain General of Valencia. In 1896, he left the captaincy and in 1898, he was a member of the Caixa d'Inútils i d'Orfes de la Guerra until he went into reserve in 1907. He died in Madrid on November 30, 1913. He was 76 years old.

== See also ==
- List of governors of Puerto Rico
- Third Carlist War
