= Romualdo Palacio González =

Spanish general and governor of Puerto Rico

General Romualdo Palacios González
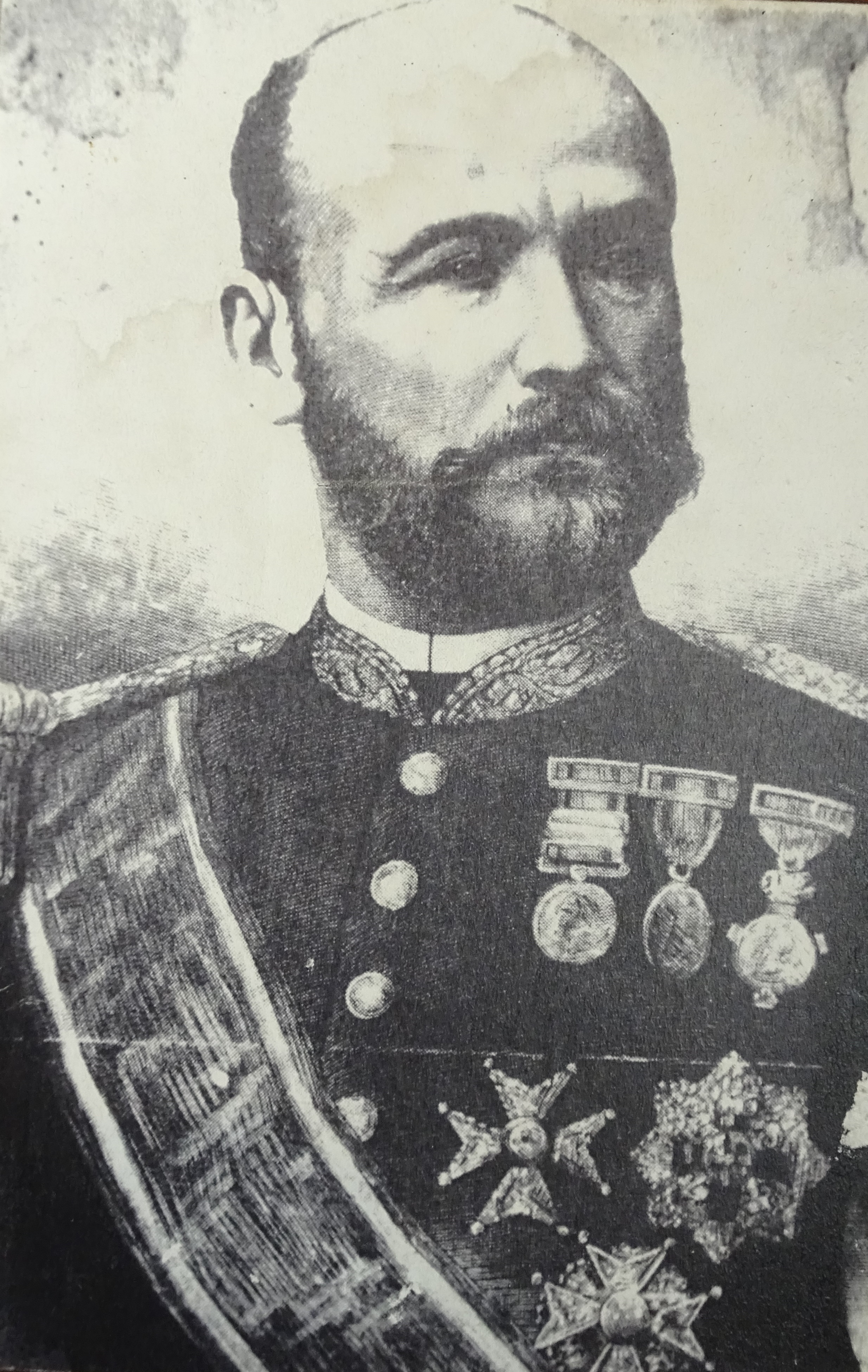
- Gen. Romualdo Palacios González

Governor of Puerto Rico
- In office 23 March 1887 – 11 November 1887
- Preceded by: Luis Daban y Ramírez de Arellano
- Succeeded by: Juan Contreras Martínez

Personal details
- Born: 27 February 1827 Málaga, Spain
- Died: 7 September 1907 (aged 80) Getafe, Madrid, Spain
- Profession: General, Governor-General of Puerto Rico

Romualdo Palacios González (8 February 1827 – 7 September 1908) was a Spanish general and governor of Puerto Rico in 1887. He is best remembered for his political persecution of Puerto Rican Autonomistas called Componte, a term that means "to rectify" or "to pacify". His favorite detention centers were the jails at the Ponce Military Barracks in Ponce and the Fort San Felipe del Morro in San Juan. Amongst his most notable persecutions was that of Román Baldorioty de Castro. Palacios was removed from office by the Spanish Government and returned to Spain on 11 November 1887. His political prisoners were released on 24 December 1887.
