= Ángel Rivero Méndez =

Puerto Rican soldier, author and businessman (1856–1930)

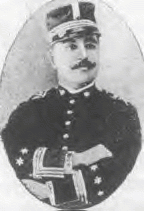
- Captain Ángel Rivero Méndez
- Born: October 2, 1856; Trujillo Bajo, Carolina, Puerto Rico
- Died: February 23, 1930 (aged 73); Cuevas, Trujillo Alto, Puerto Rico
- Burial place: Santa María Magdalena de Pazzis Cemetery, in San Juan, Puerto Rico
- Military career
- Branch: Spanish Army
- Service years: 1882–1898
- Rank: Captain
- Commands: 3rd Company of the 12th Artillery Battalion at Fort San Cristóbal
- Conflicts: Spanish–American War
- Awards: Cruz de la Orden de Mérito Militar 1ra Clase distinción Rojo (Order of Military Merit 1st Class)
- Other work: Invented Kola Champagne

148th Governor-General of Puerto Rico
- In office 16 October – 18 October 1898
- Monarch: Alfonso XIII
- Regent: Maria Christina of Austria
- Prime Minister: Práxedes Mateo Sagasta
- Minister of Overseas: Vicente Romero Girón
- Preceded by: Ricardo de Ortega y Diez
- Succeeded by: Nelson A. Miles (as US governor)

Signature
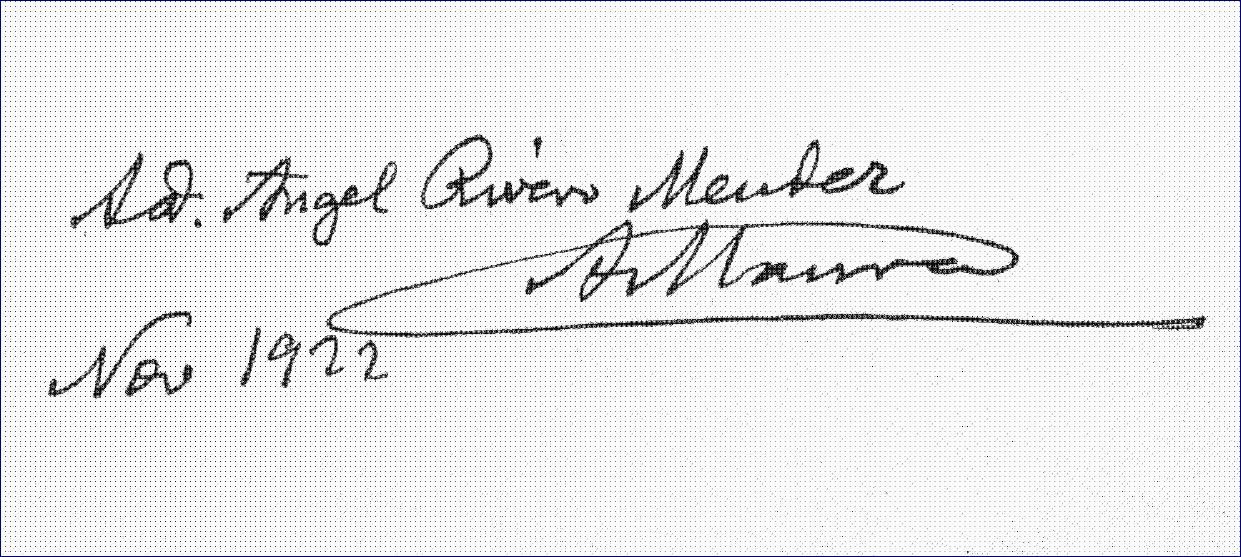

Ángel Rivero Méndez (October 2, 1856 – February 23, 1930) was a Puerto Rican soldier, writer, journalist and a businessman. Rivero Méndez was a captain in the Spanish Army during the Spanish–American War and is credited with ordering the first shot against the United States in Puerto Rico in said conflict. After the war, he became a US Citizen and upon his retirement, he wrote Crónica de la guerra hispano-americana en Puerto Rico, a chronicle of the Spanish-American War in Puerto Rico. He is also credited with inventing a carbonated drink called Kola Champagne which is still sold today.

== Early years ==
Rivero Méndez was born in Trujillo Bajo a barrio of Carolina, Puerto Rico, to Rosa Méndez and Juan Rivero, who had immigrated to Puerto Rico from the Canary Islands. He was baptized into the Catholic religion at the Church of Saint Francis of Assisi, San Juan on October 2, 1856. Rivero received his education at the "Colegio de Jesuitas" in Santurce (a section of San Juan, the capital of Puerto Rico). After graduation, he enlisted in the Spanish Army and entered the Infantry Academy of Puerto Rico. He was given an officer's commission upon graduation from the academy on August 2, 1882.

On October 16, 1882, Rivero Méndez married Manuela Boneta y Babel from San Juan. In 1885, he was accepted into the General Military Academy of Toledo in Spain. There he wrote Toledo, a book about the city of Toledo, Spain. In 1886, Rivero Méndez was transferred to the Academy of Artillery in Segovia and, on February 28, 1889, he earned a degree in Industrial Engineering.

== Military career ==
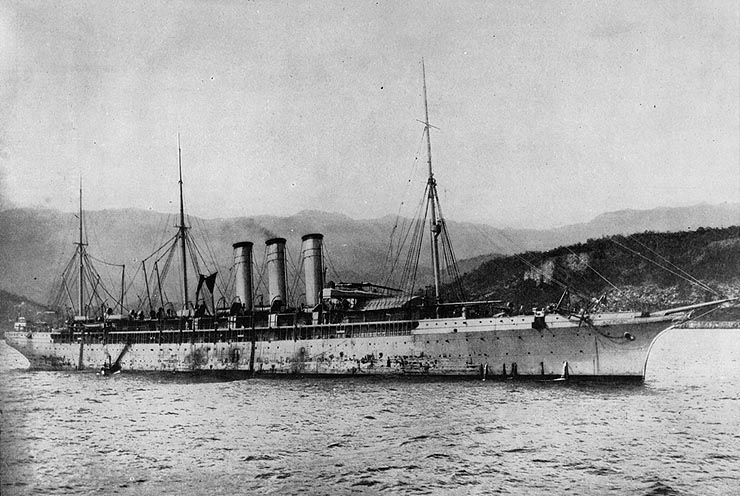
USS Yale in Cuban waters in 1898, after leaving Puerto Rico.

On January 1, 1890, Rivero Méndez returned to Puerto Rico and was assigned to the 12th Battalion of Plaza. He taught at the Military Preparatory Academy in San Juan and, in 1896, was promoted to the rank of captain. He was active in politics in the ranks of the Unconditional Spanish Party.

As a captain, he was assigned to teach math and chemistry at the Civil Institution of Secondary Education. During this time in his life, he became active in politics as member of the Unconditional Spanish Party. Rivero Méndez also founded a newspaper called La Integridad Nacional (The National Integrity), a political paper which represented the views of the party. Rivero Méndez, along with some others was expelled from the party and together they formed another political party. An article criticizing the government, written by Rivero Méndez, was published and as a consequence, he was arrested and sent to jail. Due to the rumors of war, he was pardoned by Governor Macias and, on March 1, 1898, was assigned the command of the 3rd Company of the 12th Artillery Battalion at Fort San Cristóbal in San Juan.

== Spanish–American War ==
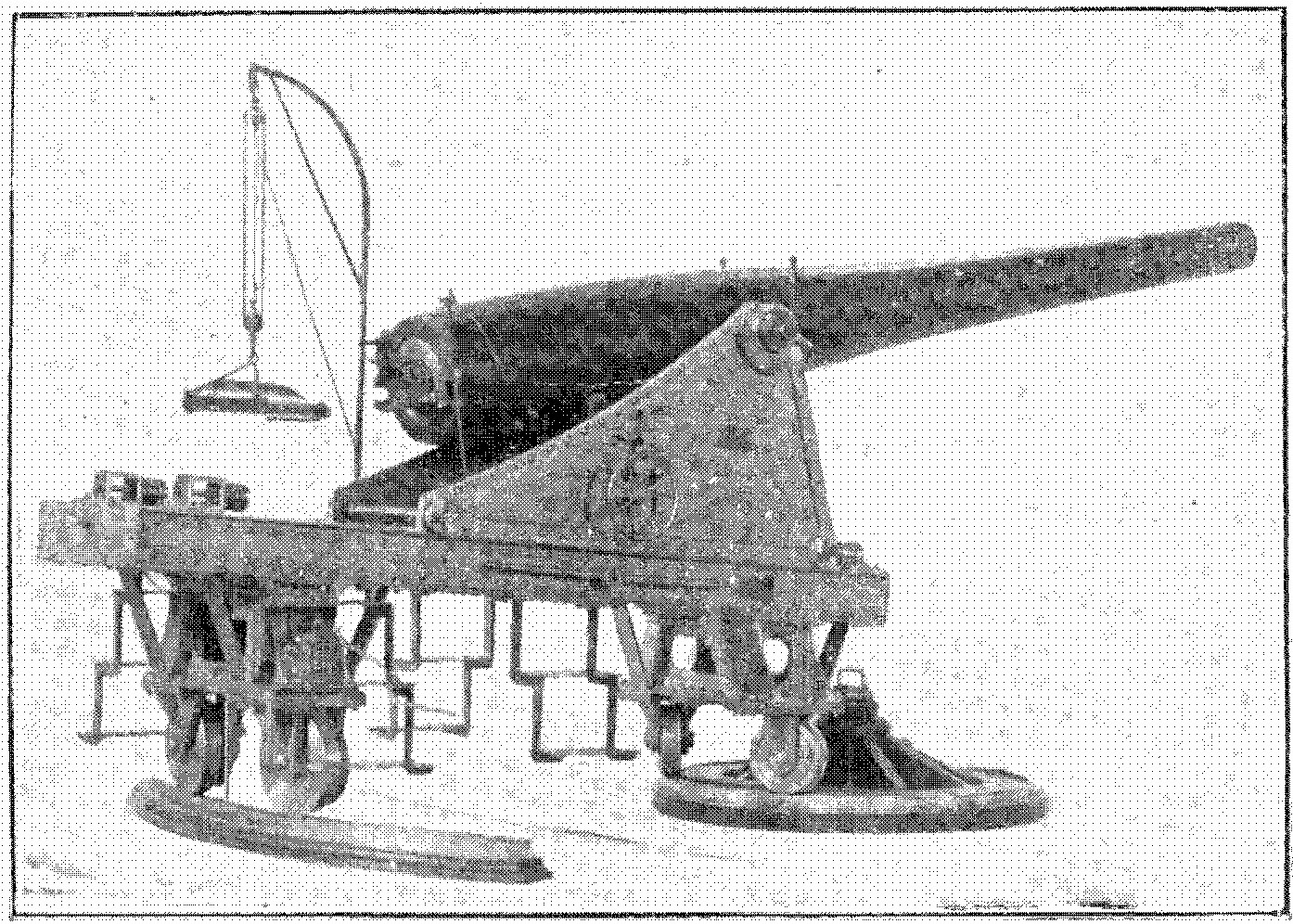
The canon from which the first shot was fired, in Puerto Rico, by Rivero Méndez

When the United States declared war against Spain, the U.S. Navy sent USS Yale to form a blockade in San Juan Bay. On May 10, 1898, Captain Rivero Méndez ordered his men to fire upon Yale, thus becoming the first attack against the Americans in Puerto Rico of Spanish–American War. For his actions, he was awarded the "Cruz de la Orden del Mérito Militar 1ra Clase con Distintivo Rojo" (The Cross of the Order of the Military Merit first class). The residents of San Juan were furious with Rivero Méndez and blamed him for the destruction caused to their city by the responding bombardments, however nothing came of those accusations.

=== Battle of Fajardo ===
On August 1, USS Puritan under the command of Captain Frederic W. Rodgers, was sailing by the coastline of the city of Fajardo, when Rogers noticed the "Faro de Las Cabezas de San Juan" (Cape San Juan lighthouse) which was supposed to be the landing site for the US Army in Puerto Rico. Rodgers ordered some of his men ashore, which included Puerto Rican volunteers, with the mission of posting the American Flag atop the lighthouse.

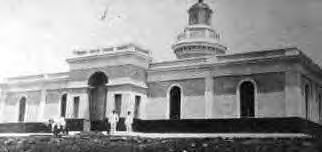
Faro de Las Cabezas de San Juan (Cape San Juan lighthouse), c. 1898.

On August 2, three more ships, USS Amphitrite, USS Leyden, and USS Hannibal arrived and joined Puritan. The 25-man Spanish garrison stationed in the city became aware of the American presence and, after notifying their superiors in San Juan, were told to withdraw. When Dr. Santiago Veve Calzada, the mayor of the city, realized that the garrison was gone and that the city was defenseless against the invading Americans, he implored the Spanish authorities in San Juan to dispatch troops to defend his city. Believing that the Spanish forces would not come to his aid, Dr. Santiago Veve Calzada then went to the lighthouse to seek protection for the city from the Americans. On the afternoon of August 3, Dr. Veve Calzada entered the city with a contingent of Marines and the United States flag was hoisted over the Fajardo Customs House and City Hall.

Rivero Méndez was ordered to investigate the situation in Fajardo. He was told that the Americans no longer occupied the city and that it would be an easy task to capture the people of Fajardo who had betrayed Spain. Rivero Méndez passed the information to General Ortega who suggested to General Macías take the town with 200 soldiers and an artillery battery. Macías was told to capture Dr. Veve and all those involved in the revolt, including the Americans in the lighthouse, even if it meant the destruction of the lighthouse. Macías refused to accept Ortega's plan.

On August 4, Governor General Macías sent Colonel Pedro del Pino and 200 men to recapture the city. When Colonel Pino entered Fajardo he found it nearly deserted because the residents, fearing a battle, had fled to the Fajardo lighthouse. Pino waited until darkness fell and then ordered his men to attack the lighthouse. The Marines signaled the ships that they were under attack and the ships began to bombard the shore in a protective pattern. The Spanish forces retreated to the city.

The following day U.S. Marine Lieutenant John A. Lejeune came ashore with a detachment of Marines and evacuated the civilians and Marines for transport to Ponce, and the lighthouse was abandoned. Meanwhile, in the city of Fajardo, Pino's men tore down the United States flags that flew over the Customs House and City Hall and returned to San Juan after verifying that the lighthouse was abandoned, displaying the flags as trophies of war. It was the only time that American forces were forced to withdraw from any position during the campaign in Puerto Rico.

== End of the conflict ==
Spain surrendered and Puerto Rico became a territory of the United States as an outcome of the Treaty of Paris of 1898. On October 18, 1898, Rivero Méndez was ordered to turn over the keys of all the military installations in San Juan to Captain Henry A. Reed of the U.S. Army. Rivero Méndez was offered a military position by both the American and Spanish governments. He declined both offers and, on April 18, 1899, he officially retired from the Spanish Army.

Newspaper reports from his obituary state that he served as governor of Puerto Rico for two days and that after the war, Rivero Méndez became a US Citizen.

== Later years ==
=== Kola Champagne ===
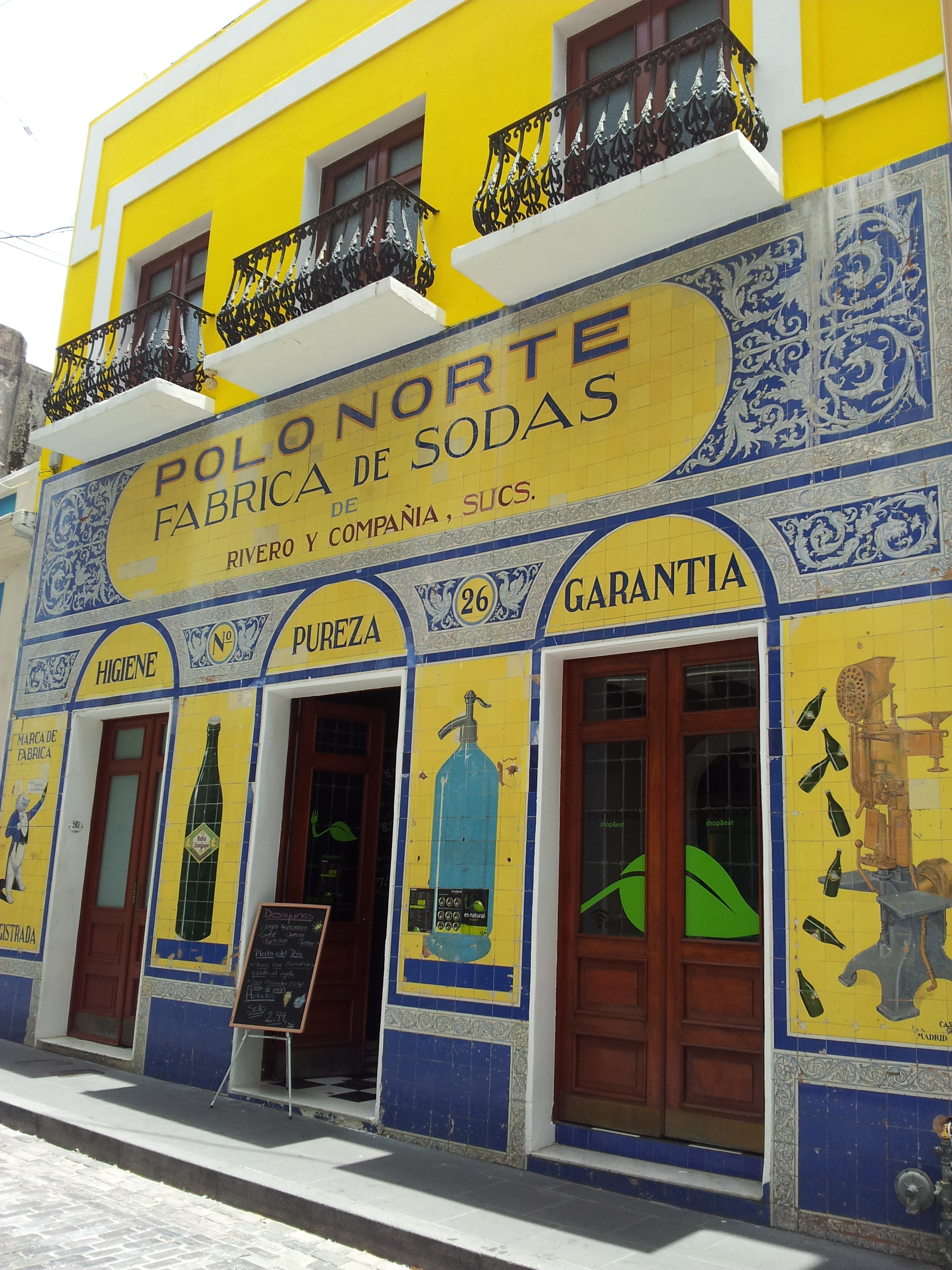
Fábrica Polo Norte

In 1902, a few years after the end of the Spanish-American War, Rivero Méndez founded El Polo Norte Fábrica de Sodas (The North Pole soda factory) under Sres. Rivero & Co. where he created Kola Champagne, which became a popular soft drink in Puerto Rico. While developing the drink he worked on his book, Chronicle of the Spanish-American War in Puerto Rico. Now, Kola Champagne is manufactured and sold in the United States and Mexico by Goya Foods, Inc. Other countries that have also produced the drink are Colombia and Jamaica.

=== Author ===
Rivero Méndez dedicated much of his later years to obtaining records and information for a book he wrote on the Spanish–American War in Puerto Rico. He also wrote articles for the newspapers El Imparcial, El Mundo and La Correspondencia de Puerto Rico, where he defended Puerto Rican nationalism and the ideal of Puerto Rican independence. In 1922, Rivero Méndez published his book Crónica de la Guerra Hispano Americana en Puerto Rico (Chronicles of the Spanish–American War in Puerto Rico), which is considered to be one of the most complete works written in regard to that military action.

Rivero Méndez and his wife were devotees of the Virgin of Lourdes. In 1924, he built a shrine dedicated to the Virgin of Lourdes, on his land in Trujillo Alto. The shrine, which still stands today and is considered an important landmark of the area, was blessed by San Juan's Bishop Jorge Caruana on January 6, 1925.

== Death ==
Rivero Méndez died of a self-inflicted gunshot wound on February 23, 1930, while at his country home in Cuevas barrio, in Trujillo Alto. He was 68 years old. His remains are buried in the Santa María Magdalena de Pazzis Cemetery, in San Juan, Puerto Rico.

== Military decoration ==
Military decoration awarded to Rivero Méndez:

- Cruz de la Orden del Mérito Militar 1ra Clase con Distantivo Rojo (Order of Military Merit 1st Class)
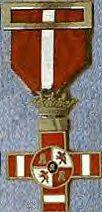
Cruz de la Orden del Mérito Militar 1ra Clase con Distantivo Rojo

== See also ==
- List of Puerto Ricans
- List of Puerto Rican military personnel
- Puerto Rican Campaign
- Military history of Puerto Rico
- Puerto Rican scientists and inventors
