= Office of Insular Affairs =

Subsidiary of the Department of the Interior

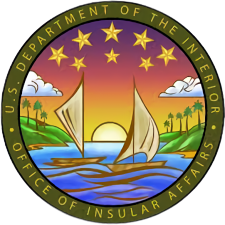
- Seal and Logo of the Office of Insular Affairs

Agency overview
- Formed: September 14, 1934
- Preceding agencies: Office of Territorial Affairs; Division of Territories and Island Possessions
- Jurisdiction: United States federal government
- Headquarters: Main Interior Building 1849 C Street NW, Washington, D.C. 20240
- Employees: 40 permanent
- Annual budget: $597 million (2015)
- Agency executives: William W. Hauge, Assistant Secretary for Insular & International Affairs; Angel Demapan, Deputy Assistant Secretary for Insular & International Affairs
- Parent agency: Department of the Interior
- Website: Official website

The Office of Insular Affairs (OIA) is a unit of the United States Department of the Interior that oversees federal administration of several United States insular areas. It is the successor to the Bureau of Insular Affairs of the War Department, which administered certain territories from 1902 to 1939, and the Office of Territorial Affairs (formerly the Division of Territories and Island Possessions and then the Office of Territories) in the Interior Department, which was responsible for certain territories from the 1930s to the 1990s. The word "insular" comes from the Latin word insula ("island").

Currently, the OIA has administrative responsibility for coordinating federal policy in the territories of American Samoa, Guam, the U.S. Virgin Islands, and the Commonwealth of the Northern Mariana Islands, and oversight of federal programs and funds in the freely associated Federated States of Micronesia, the Republic of the Marshall Islands, and the Republic of Palau.

The OIA, led by the Assistant Secretary of the Interior for Insular Areas, also has jurisdiction of "excluded areas" of Palmyra Atoll and "residual administration" of Wake Island.

Relations between the United States and Puerto Rico are coordinated between the Office of the Deputy Assistant to the President for Intergovernmental Affairs and the Puerto Rico Federal Affairs Administration, not the OIA.

== History ==
The office has evolved over the years along with changes in administration and in United States territories.

Prior to the 1930s, responsibility for administration of United States possessions was divided among several government departments. Alaska and Hawaii were under the Interior Department; Puerto Rico and the Philippine Islands were administered by the Bureau of Insular Affairs in the War Department; and the United States Virgin Islands, Guam, and American Samoa were administered by the United States Department of the Navy.

=== Division of Territories and Island Possessions ===
The Division of Territories and Island Possessions, from 1934 to 1950 was responsible for administering the Interior Department's responsibilities over the territories and island possessions of the United States that were consolidated into the Interior Department. Under the supervision of the Secretary of the Interior, the Division served as a mediator between the territories and Federal government by performing administrative activities for the territorial governments and taking on colonization projects that furthered the interests of the United States in those areas.

The Division was established within the Interior Department on May 29, 1934, under President Franklin D. Roosevelt's Executive Order 6726 pursuant of the Economy Act of March 20, 1933 which required the President to reorganize the Executive branch. The Executive Order transferred the administrative functions over Puerto Rico from the Bureau of Insular Affairs War Department to the newly formed division.

On February 13, 1936, by Secretary Order 1040, the Division was assigned responsibilities from the Interior Department over territorial affairs in Alaska, the Alaska Railroad project, the Alaska Road Commission, and the jurisdiction over the Hawaiian Islands and the U.S. Virgin Islands. In May 1936 and March 1938 by Executive Order 7368 and Executive Order 7828, Baker Island, Howland Island, Jarvis Island, Canton Island, and Enderbury Island were placed under the Interior Department and assigned to the Division.

On July 1, 1939, the Bureau of Insular Affairs War Department and its functions, including its administrative responsibilities over the Philippine Islands was transferred to the Interior Department and consolidated with the Division by the Reorganization Plan No. II of 1939.

In 1943, the Division was reorganized into three geographic and two functional branches: Hawaii and the Philippine Islands, Alaska, and Puerto Rico and the Virgin Islands, Legal, and Administrative.

In 1949, the Division's administrative responsibilities were expanded to include Guam by Executive Order 10077 and made effective July 1, 1950 by Executive Order 10137. In 1950, the Office of Territories was established and the functions of the Division were transferred to the Office by the Secretarial Order No. 2577.

The first Director of Territories was Ernest Gruening, who served from 1934 to 1939, and later served as the territorial governor of Alaska and then as one of the first senators elected from Alaska upon statehood.

The major publication from the Division was the Annual Reports of the Department of the Interior that had a section on the Division of Territories and Island Possessions written by the Director outlining the Division's activities over the past fiscal year. Additionally, the Division published general information serial pamphlets on Puerto Rico, the Virgin Islands, and the Territories of Alaska and Hawaii, and later general information on the Trust Territory. The Division also published specific reports pertaining to Alaska's postwar period and road and agricultural development efforts, as well as a report on surplus property of its administrative areas.

=== Office of Territories ===
In 1950, the Division's name was changed to the Office of Territories and the office's work was significantly reduced in 1952 after Puerto Rico attained commonwealth status and in 1959 Alaska and Hawaii were granted statehood.

=== Office of Territorial Affairs ===
In 1971, the Office of Territories was temporarily abolished and administration was coordinated by a Deputy Assistant Secretary for Territorial Affairs in the Office of the Assistant Secretary for Public Land Management. In 1973, the agency was reconstituted as the Office of Territorial Affairs, which remained the designation until 1980, when an Office of Assistant Secretary for Territorial and International Affairs was created. (The designation "international" refers to what became the freely associated states of the Marshall Islands, the Federated States of Micronesia, and Palau.)

Today, the Interior Department, through the Office of Insular Affairs, continues to be responsible for the outlying insular areas including American Samoa, Guam, the U.S. Virgin Islands, and the Northern Mariana Islands.

== See also ==
- Insular area
- Compact of Free Association
