= Manuel Macías y Casado =

Spanish general and colonial governor (1844-1937)

The Most Excellent Manuel Macías OIC
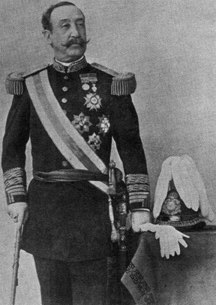

146th Governor-General of Puerto Rico
- In office January 17, 1898 – October 16, 1898
- Monarch: Alfonso XIII
- Regent: Maria Christina of Austria
- Prime Minister: Práxedes Mateo Sagasta
- Minister of Overseas: Segismundo Moret; Vicente Romero Girón
- Preceded by: Ricardo De Ortega y Diez
- Succeeded by: Ricardo De Ortega y Diez

Personal details
- Born: November 3, 1844 Teruel, Province of Teruel, Spain
- Died: November 7, 1937 (aged 93) Madrid, Community of Madrid, Spain
- Spouse: Concepción Ramírez de Arellano y Cortés

Military service
- Allegiance: Spain
- Branch/service: Spanish Army
- Years of service: 1863–???
- Rank: Teniente general
- Battles/wars: Dominican Restoration War; Ten Years' War; Spanish-American War

Manuel Macías y Casado, OIC (November 3, 1844 – November 7, 1937) was a Spanish general. He served as Governor-General of Puerto Rico during the Spanish–American War and as governor of Melilla (in three separate terms), and occupied various other posts. Born in Teruel, Spain, Macías attended the Colegio de Infantería and became a sub-lieutenant at the age of 17. He became a lieutenant in Cuba on January 1, 1863. In December 1863 he was transferred to Santo Domingo. He was promoted to captain in March 1864. He remained in Santo Domingo until 1865.

From 1865 to April 1875, he was stationed again in Cuba. He saw action on Cuba during the Ten Years' War and was promoted to lieutenant colonel and then colonel in March 1874.

He returned to Spain in 1875 and was stationed at Melilla until 1886, and then afterwards at Albacete and Santander. He became a general on June 9, 1891, and was made governor of Cartagena. He was then stationed at Valencia and afterwards Melilla, where he served as military governor (1893–94). He was made Lieutenant General and was named Captain General of the Canary Islands in August 1894. After 1894, Julio Cervera Baviera, later a pioneer in the development of radio, served as aide-de-camp to Macías in the latter's various assignments.

== Puerto Rico ==
On January 17, 1898, Macías was named Governor General and Captain General of Puerto Rico.

With the eruption of the Spanish–American War, Macías declared martial law, resolving to resist the American forces. He declared: "Providence will not permit that in these countries which were discovered by the Spanish nation the echo of our language should ever cease to be heard, nor that our flag should disappear before the eyes. ... Long live Puerto Rico, always Spanish. Long live Spain." Macías hoped that a grant of autonomy would ensure that Puerto Ricans would remain loyal to the Spanish crown. However, he had few military resources with which to resist an American invasion: 8,000 regulars (which were scattered across various cities) and 700–900 volunteers (Puerto Rican militia). Ponce and Mayagüez had no defense forces, and the naval forces consisted only of 368 men.

After the defeat, he departed from Puerto Rico on October 16, 1898, on the steamship Covadonga with the majority of the Spanish troops. The fort of San Cristóbal gave the last Spanish governor of the island a farewell consisting of a salvo of 21 cannon shots. He entrusted General Ricardo de Ortega y Diez with the ceremony that marked the handover of the island to the United States, which occurred on October 18, 1898. After the war, Macías' former aide-de-camp, Cervera Baviera, gained notoriety as the author of a pamphlet called La defensa de Puerto Rico, which supported the actions of General Macias before the Spanish public but ended up criticizing the Puerto Rican volunteers in the Spanish Army.

== After the Spanish–American War ==
He was afterwards named Captain General of Burgos, Navarre, and the Basque Country, and commander-in-chief of the 6th Army Corps.

The Spanish Civil War had been raging for one year when he died at Madrid in 1937. He was ninety-three years old.

== Personal life ==
Macías married Concepción Ramírez de Arellano y Cortés (d. 1950). They had seven children: Manuel, Concepción, Carmen, Cristina, the twins Clotilde and Luisa, and Clemente.

== See also ==
- Puerto Rican Campaign
