= Miguel Antonio de Ustáriz =

Governor of Puerto Rico (died 1792)

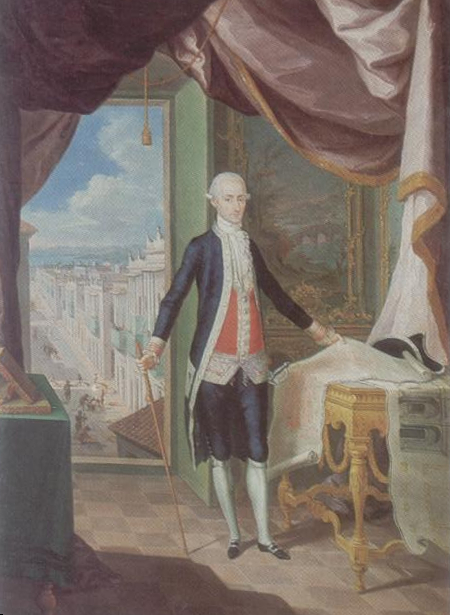
- Miguel Antonio de Ustáriz, by José Campeche (c.1790)
- Occupation: Politician

Miguel Antonio de Ustáriz (died on the Atlantic Ocean in 1792) was governor of Puerto Rico from 1789 to 1792.

He previously had been a captain of the Royal Guard (Spain).
