= Ricardo de Ortega y Diez =

Spanish general and colonial governor

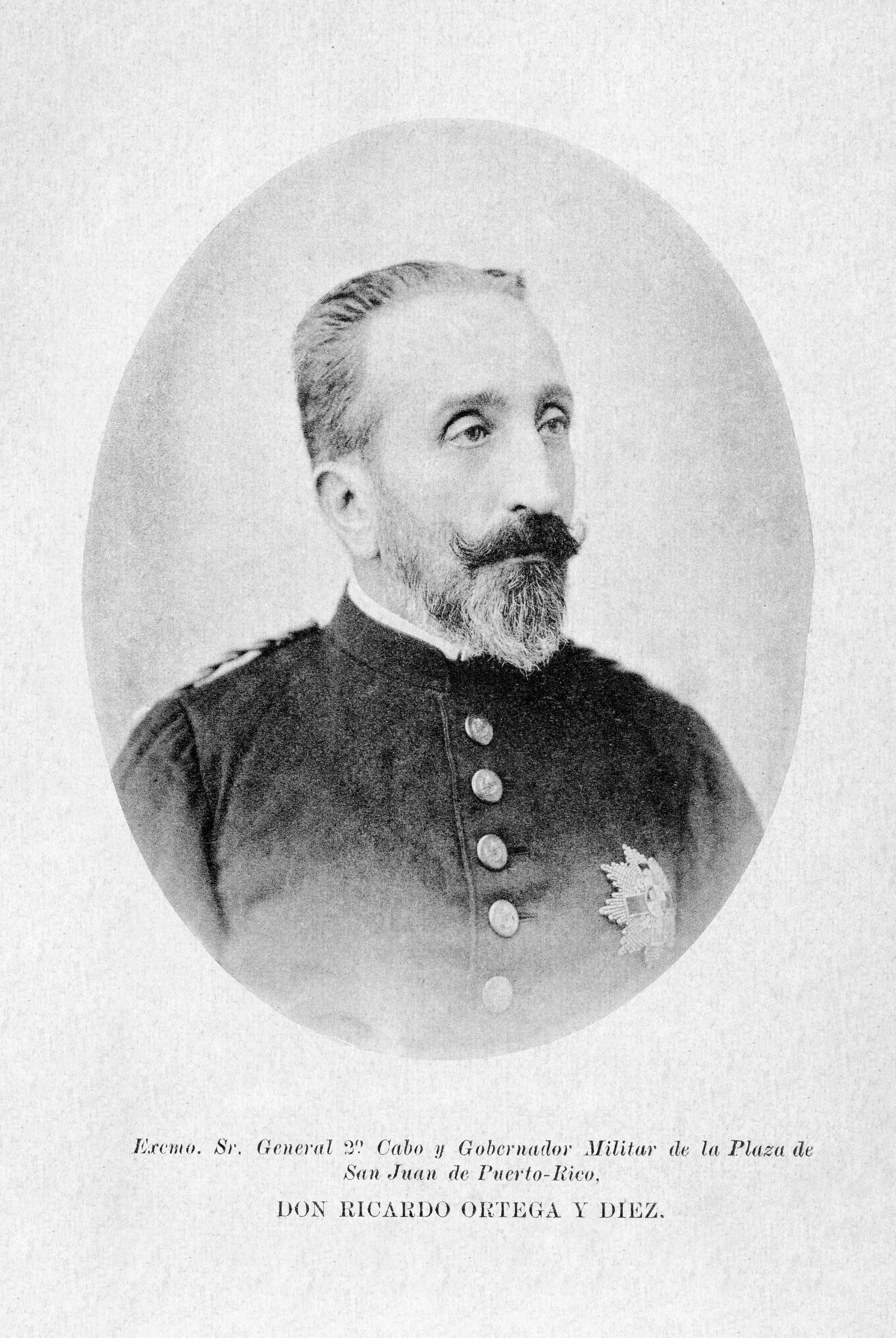

143rd, 145th & 147th Governor-general of Puerto Rico
- In office 4 January – 11 January 1898
- Monarch: Alfonso XIII
- Regent: Maria Christina of Austria
- Prime Minister: Práxedes Mateo Sagasta
- Minister of Overseas: Segismundo Moret
- Preceded by: Sabas Marín González
- Succeeded by: Andrés González Muñoz
- In office 11 January – 2 February 1898
- Monarch: Alfonso XIII
- Regent: Maria Christina of Austria
- Prime Minister: Práxedes Mateo Sagasta
- Minister of Overseas: Segismundo Moret
- Preceded by: Andrés González Muñoz
- Succeeded by: Manuel Macías Casado
- In office 14 October – 16 October 1898
- Monarch: Alfonso XIII
- Regent: Maria Christina of Austria
- Prime Minister: Práxedes Mateo Sagasta
- Minister of Overseas: Vicente Romero Girón
- Preceded by: Manuel Macías Casado
- Succeeded by: Ángel Rivero Méndez

Personal details
- Born: 10 August 1838 Madrid, Spain
- Died: 3 December 1917 (aged 79) Madrid, Spain
- Profession: General, Governor-General of Puerto Rico

Ricardo de Ortega y Diez (10 August 1838 – 3 December 1917) was a Spanish general. He served as interim Governor-General of Puerto Rico during three periods of the Spanish–American War, and occupied various other posts. Born in Madrid, Spain, Ortega y Diez attended the Colegio de Infantería and became a sub-lieutenant at the age of 17.

From 1859 to 1860, he served in Africa obtaining the rank of captain. On 24 May 1873, he received the rank of lieutenant general and participated in several actions against Carlists. In early 1880s, he was the Director of the Central Shooting School, inventing a quick loader for rifles in 1889.

In 1892, he reached the rank of division general and returned to Africa the following year to work with the tribes of Melilla. In 1895, he served as Military Governor of Madrid. On 19 February 1896, he was named second corporal of the Capitanía General of Puerto Rico and Military Governor of San Juan. According to tradition, in 1898, just before the United States took possession of Puerto Rico after the Spanish-American War, the last governor, Ricardo de Ortega, struck a colonial clock with his sword. This act symbolized the exact moment Spain lost control of the island and its final possession in the Americas.The clock is still kept in La Fortaleza.

After the Spanish–American War, he received the rank of lieutenant general in 1901. In 1903 he received the rank of Captain General of the Balearic Islands until 1910. That year he turned to the Reserve after 54 years of military service. He died in Madrid, Spain, on 3 December 1917.
