= Bureau of Insular Affairs =

Division of the U.S. Dept. of War which administered several U.S. territories (1898-1939)

- Bureau of Insular Affairs Branch Insignia
- Active: 1898-1939
- Country: United States
- Branch: United States Army
- Type: Territorial Governance

The Bureau of Insular Affairs was a division of the United States Department of War that oversaw civil administration aspects of several U.S. territories from 1898 until 1939.

== History ==
The bureau was created 13 December 1898 as the Division of Customs and Insular Affairs within the Office of the Secretary of War. This followed the Spanish–American War, which resulted in the transfer of several areas from Spain to the United States, including the Philippines, Puerto Rico, and Cuba. The bureau supervised the customs and civil affairs of these areas. The word "insular" was already associated with Cuba and Puerto Rico because Spain had created autonomous "insular" governments for both islands in February 1898.

In 1900, the name was changed to Division of Insular Affairs. In 1902, it became the Bureau of Insular Affairs. As a result of the Insular Cases, the U.S. Attorney General issued an opinion in 1915 stating that the insular areas were unincorporated territories of the United States. In 1939, the bureau was replaced by the Division of Territories and Island Possessions in the Department of the Interior. This division was later renamed the Office of Insular Affairs.

=== Puerto Rico ===
From 1898–1900 and again in 1909–1934, the bureau was responsible for the administration of Puerto Rico, called "Porto Rico" in official U.S. government documents until 1932. Puerto Rico, also an unincorporated territory of the United States, was administered under a civil government created by the Foraker Act of 1900, amended by the Jones–Shafroth Act of 1917. In 1934, the bureau's functions for Puerto Rico were transferred to the Division of Territories and Island Possessions (later the Office of Territories and still later the Office of Territorial Affairs) within the Department of the Interior.

=== Cuba and neighbors ===
The bureau's other responsibilities included oversight of Cuba, although those responsibilities were not clearly defined. From 1906–1909, it administered the sovereign Republic of Cuba during the Second Occupation of Cuba. In 1904–1905, it briefly had oversight of the Panama Canal. From 1905–1939, it administered the Dominican customs receivership. In 1920–1924, it administered the Haitian customs receivership.

=== Philippines ===
The bureau was responsible for civil aspects of the Philippine government from 1898–1935. The United States Military Government of the Philippine Islands was replaced by the Insular Government following the Spooner Amendment of 1901.

== Chiefs of Insular Affairs ==
Division of Customs and Insular Affairs

- Major John J. Pershing (10 March 1899 - 24 August 1899)
- Lt. Colonel Clarence R. Edwards (12 February 1900 - 30 June 1902)

Bureau of Insular Affairs

- Brigadier General Clarence R. Edwards (1 July 1902 - 23 August 1912)
- Major General Frank McIntyre (24 August 1912 - 5 January 1929)
- Brigadier General Francis L. Parker (9 January 1929 - 9 January 1933)
- Brigadier General Creed F. Cox (Acting 9 January 1933 - 24 May 1933)
- Brigadier General Creed F. Cox (24 May 1933 - 23 May 1937)
- Brigadier General Charles Burnett (24 May 1937 - 1 July 1939)
