= 1st Rhode Island Infantry Regiment =

- Active: April 1861 to August 1861 and May 20, 1898 to April 1899
- Country: United States
- Allegiance: Union; United States
- Branch: Infantry
- Engagements: American Civil War: First Battle of Bull Run; Spanish–American War

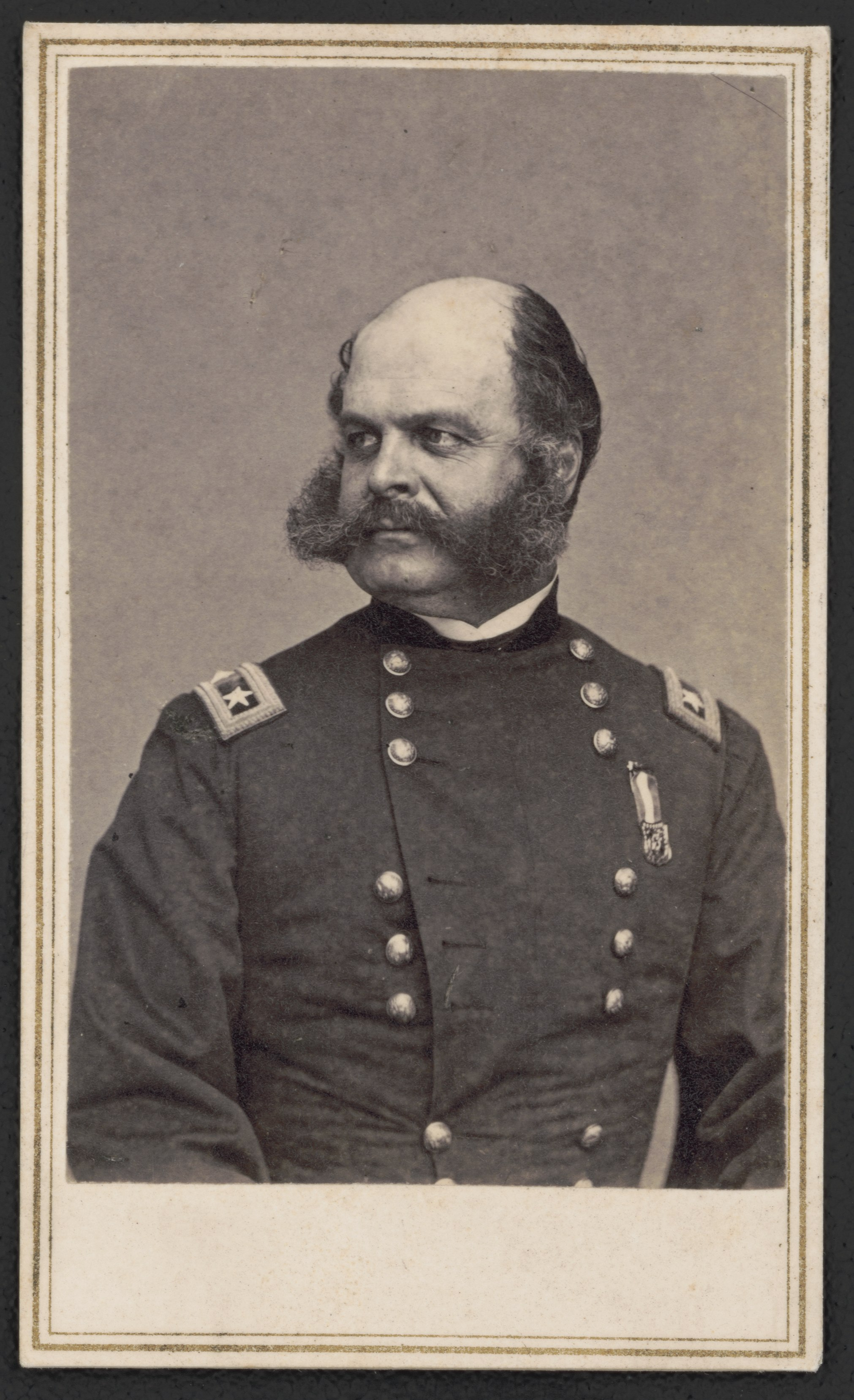
Major General Ambrose Burnside of 1st Rhode Island Infantry Regiment. From the Liljenquist Family Collection of Civil War Photographs, Prints and Photographs Division, Library of Congress

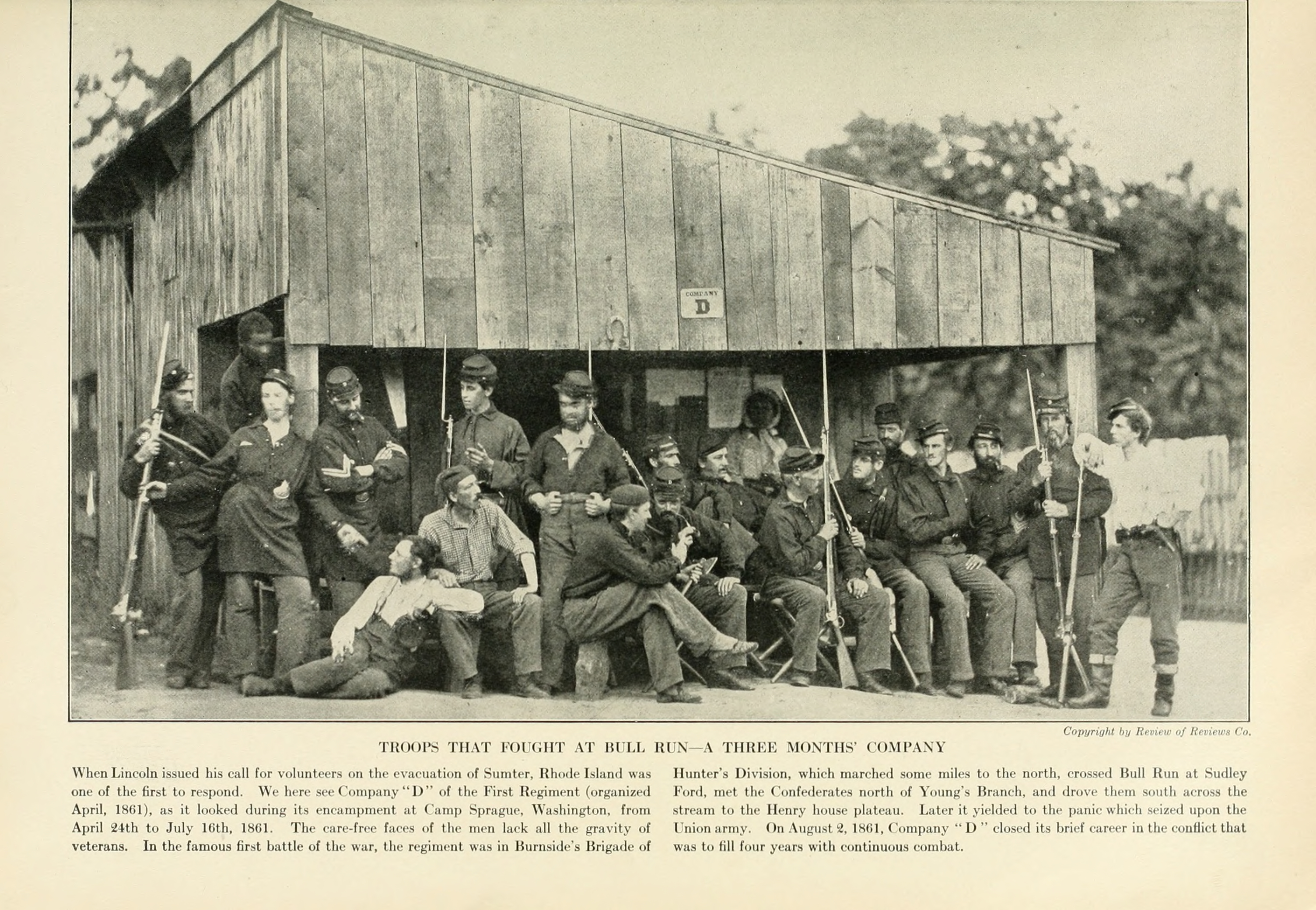
Company D at Camp Sprague, Washington, 1861

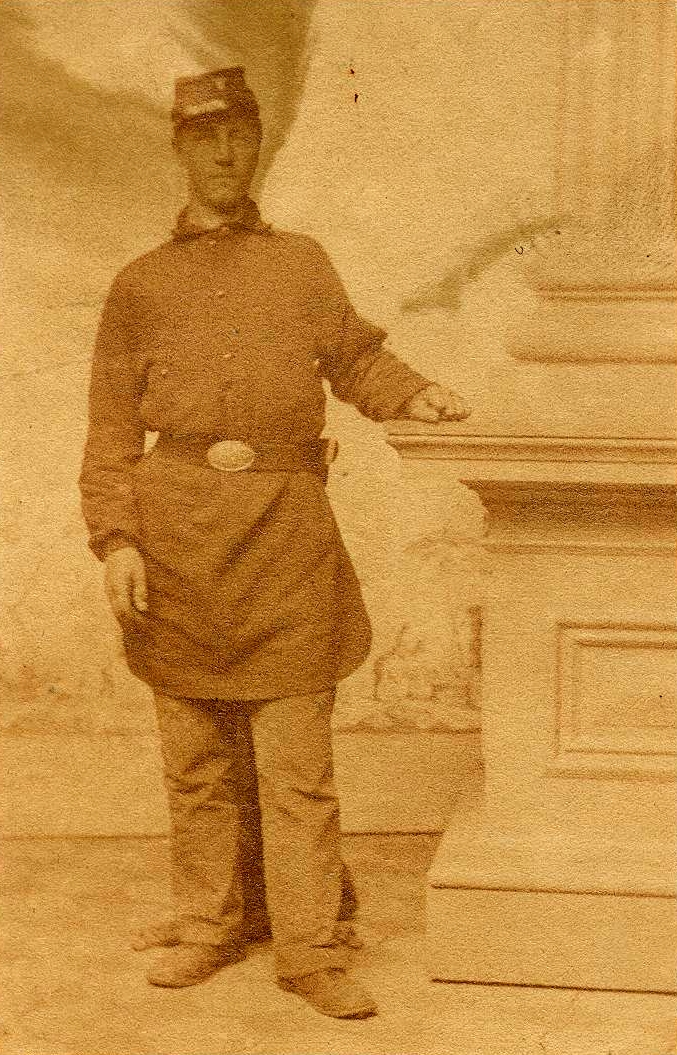
Pvt. Wheaton Theodore King, aged 19, before the First Bull Run, where he was wounded, taken to Richmond, then released to Philadelphia, where he died on January 28, 1862.

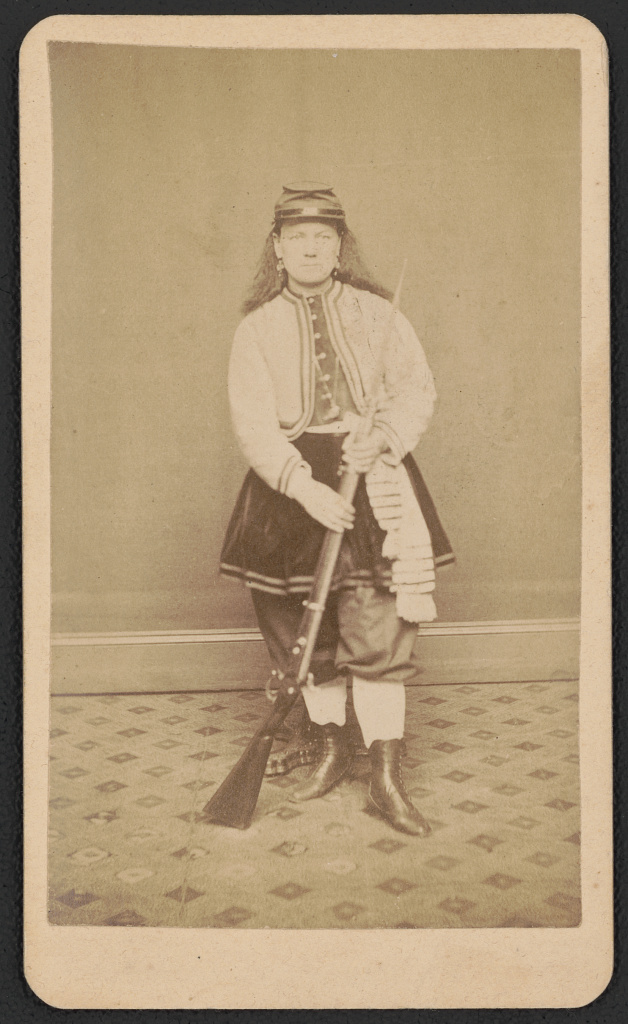
Kady Brownell, vivandière associated with 1st Rhode Island Infantry Regiment and 5th Rhode Island Heavy Artillery Regiment with bayoneted rifle

The 1st Rhode Island Infantry Regiment were two regiments of the United States Army, the first of which was raised in 1861 at the beginning of the American Civil War on a 90-day enlistment, the second during the Spanish–American War in 1898.

== 1st Rhode Island Infantry Regiment ==
The 1st Rhode Island Infantry Regiment was originally called the 1st Rhode Island Detached Militia. It was organized in Rhode Island in April 1861 and mustered into Federal service on May 2, 1861 under the command of Colonel Ambrose Burnside. It moved to Washington, D. C. and was attached to Ambrose Burnside's Brigade in Irvin McDowell's Army of Northeastern Virginia on July 16 after duty at Camp Sprague in the defense of Washington. The regiment advanced on Manassas, Virginia on July 16–21, seeing action at the First Battle of Bull Run on July 21. It left Washington, D.C. for home on July 25 and mustered out on August 2, 1861. During its service, the regiment lost a total of 25 men.

== 1st Regiment, Rhode Island Volunteers ==
Under proclamation signed April 23, 1898, President William McKinley ordered the call up of 125,000 troops. Rhode Island was directed by Secretary of War Russell A. Alger to raise a regiment of infantry from existing militia units in lieu of conscripting 720 individuals to augment the Regular Army as U.S. Volunteers by letter dated April 25, 1898. On May 2 the state established a camp site at Quonset Point in Rhode Island, and formally named the site "Camp Dyer" in honor of Governor Elisha Dyer, Jr. on May 7, 1898. The regiment began to muster until fully assembled between May 10 and 17, with Colonel Charles Wheaton Abbot, Jr., commanding. Initially the unit consisted of forty-six officers and 958 enlisted men. This regiment, the only infantry regiment raised on Rhode Island during the war, was constituted of several militia infantry units in Rhode Island as well as individual volunteers.

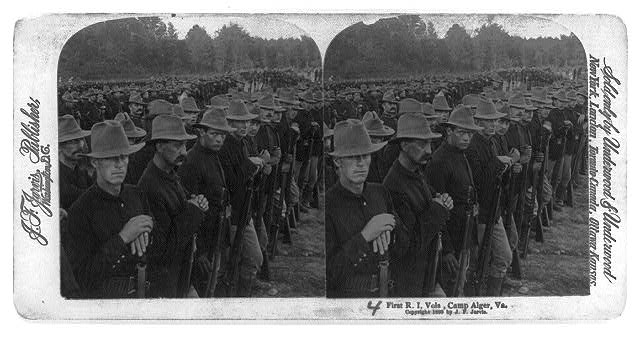
1st Rhode Island Volunteers at Camp Alger

The unit was assigned to the 3rd Division, Second Army Corps and reported for duty at Camp Alger, Virginia, from late May. However the regiment and the rest of Second Corps left Camp Alger in early August 1898, due to a typhoid fever epidemic. The regiment relocated to another part of Virginia at Thoroughfare Gap in an attempted run from the virus. However, conditions in Thoroughfare Gap resulted in dysentery and malaria, and the unit eventually relocated to Camp Meade, Pennsylvania, with the rest of Second Corps in August 1898. The overcrowded conditions forced the relocation of the 3rd Brigade of the 2nd Division of Second Corps to Camp Fornance, South Carolina.

The regiment was mustered out of federal service on March 30, 1899, at Columbia, South Carolina. The unit returned to Providence and handed over colors to Governor Elisha Dyer after a parade past city hall on April 1, 1899. At the time of muster-out, the regiment included forty-five officers and 1,039 enlisted men. During its term of service, the unit lost eleven enlisted men who died from disease and one enlisted man who died as the result of an accident. Thirty-five more enlisted men were discharged for disability. The unit also had thirteen enlisted men court-martialed and eighty-nine men deserted the regiment.

The regiment nicknamed itself the "Rough Walkers" which was inspired by Roosevelt's Rough Riders. Veterans of the regiment received an unofficial medal called the Rough Walker Medal.

=== Unit timeline ===
- May 20, 1898, fully mustered at Camp Dyer, Quonset Point, Warwick, Rhode Island.
- May 27, departed Camp Dyer for Camp Alger, Dunn Loring, Virginia.
- May 30, arrived in Camp Alger.
- Aug 3, departed Camp Alger for Thoroughfare Gap, Virginia.
- Aug 8, arrived in Thoroughfare Gap.
- Aug 21/22, departed Thoroughfare Gap for Camp George Meade, Harrisburg, Pennsylvania.
- Aug 23/24, arrived at Camp George Meade.
- Nov 13, departed Camp George Meade for Camp Fornance, Columbia, South Carolina.
- Mar 1, 1899, unit disarmed, and muster out date set for March 30.
- Mar 30, mustered out of service at Camp Fornance, departed for Jersey City, New Jersey, by rail road.
- May 31, arrived in Jersey City and embarked aboard the steamer Rhode Island for Providence, Rhode Island.
- Apr 1, 1899, arrived at India Point wharf and paraded past city hall, and turned over colors at Dexter parade ground (unit temporarily rearmed at pier and disarmed at parade ground).

=== Organization ===
- First Regiment Rhode Island Volunteers
  - Field and Staff
  - 1st Battalion (Companies A, B, C and D)
  - 2nd Battalion (Companies E, F, G and H)
  - 3rd Battalion (Companies I, K, L and M)

=== Other units ===
In addition to the first regiment, the state of Rhode Island raised the following units for the war with Spain:

- Light Battery A, 1st Rhode Island Volunteer Artillery.
- Light Battery B, 1st Rhode Island Volunteer Artillery.
- 1st Provisional Company of Infantry commanded by Lieutenant Theodore Francis Green, a future Governor of Rhode Island and United States Senator.
- Members of the Rhode Island Naval Militia who served under federal orders.
- Members of the Rhode Island Naval Militia who were assigned to the USS Vulcan as part of the U.S. Navy.
- Members of the state Rhode Island Militia Hospital Corps who served under federal orders.

== See also ==
- 1st Rhode Island Regiment, American Revolutionary War unit
- Rhode Island in the American Civil War
- List of Rhode Island Civil War units
- Kady Brownell
