= Second Army Corps (Spanish–American War) =

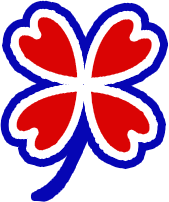
- Active: May 7, 1898 – May 3, 1899
- Country: United States of America
- Branch: Army of the United States
- Type: Army Corps
- Role: Infantry
- Engagements: Spanish–American War; Battle of the Aguadores only Separate Brigade, 3rd Division; Puerto Rico Campaign only 2nd Brigade, 1st Division; Battle of Yauco; Battle of Guayama

Commanders
- Notable commanders: Major General William M. Graham; Major General Samuel B.M. Young

Insignia
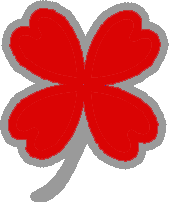
- Second Corps 1st Division

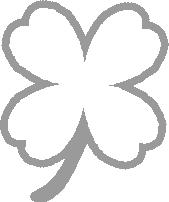
- Second Corps 2nd Division

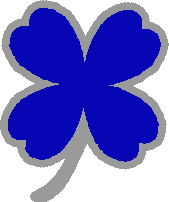
- Second Corps 3rd Division

The Second Army Corps was a unit of the United States Army raised for the Spanish–American War. A defining event of the Spanish–American War was the typhoid fever epidemic of July to November 1898. The Army consequently undertook a series of mass-retreats and attempted evasions. The Typhoid Board concluded that only one of the five army corps stricken with epidemic typhoid succeeded in suppressing the disease actively, the 2nd Army Corps. In the wake of two fruitless relocations and months of casualties, commanders finally managed to impose an effective latrine-policy. A three-part strategy of draconian defecation-management, mass-disinfection, and flight received the Typhoid Board's imprimatur as the principal, recommended method for suppressing existing epidemics.

== Second Army Corps ==
The corps was constituted May 7, 1898; on May 16, Maj. Gen. William M. Graham was assigned to the command and the troops which were to compose the corps were ordered to Camp Alger.

After the declaration of war McKinley revised that arrangement and approved the organization of eight army corps, each of which was to consist of three or more divisions of three brigades each. Each brigade was to have approximately 3,600 officers and enlisted men organized into three regiments and, with three such brigades, each division was to total about 11,000 officers and men. Thus the division was to be about the same size as the division of 1861, but army corps were to be larger. The division staff

initially was to have an adjutant general, quartermaster, commissary, surgeon, inspector general, and engineer, with an ordnance officer added later. The brigade staff was identical except that no inspector general or ordnance officer was authorized.

In mid-May the volunteers were moved to a few large unfinished camps in the South, and when they arrived only seven instead of the eight projected army corps were organized. Two army corps, the Fourth and Fifth consisted of regulars and volunteers, while the others like the Second Corps were made up of volunteers.

Before the new army completed its organization and training, it was thrust into combat. About two-thirds of Fifth Army Corps, in the form of one dismounted cavalry division and two infantry divisions, sailed for Cuba in June 1898. Expeditions also were mounted for Puerto Rico and the Philippine Islands, in which partial army corps provided the troops.

=== Corps headquarters ===
The following troops were attached to Second Corps Headquarters:

- 6th company, U.S.V. Signal Corps.
- The 11th Company, U.S.V. Signal Corps, Capt. Carl F. Hartmand, Commanding, joined at Camp Alger, Va., July 13, 1898, with a strength of 3 officers and 56 enlisted men.

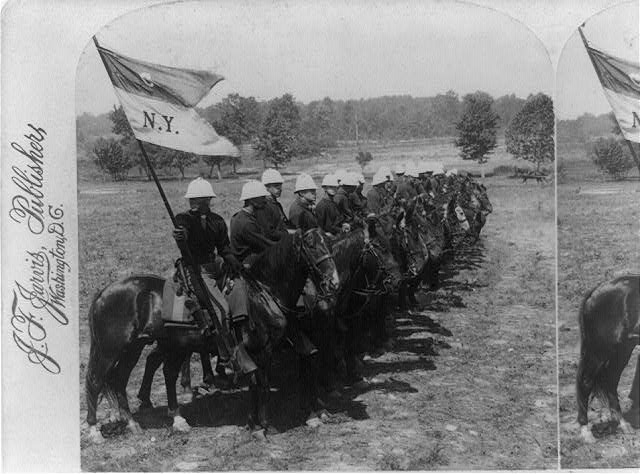
Troop C, Vol. Cavalry from Brooklyn, Camp Alger, Va.

- The Squadron New York Volunteer Cavalry (Troops A and C), Capt. Bertram T. Clayton, Commanding, joined at Camp Alger, Va., May 22, 1898, with a strength of four officers and 180 enlisted men. This squadron served in Puerto Rico during August 1898 with the Squadron Pennsylvania Volunteer Cavalry.
- The Squadron Pennsylvania Volunteer Cavalry, Capt. John C. Groome. Commanding, joined at Camp Alger, Va., July 8, 1898, with a strength of 9 officers and 287 enlisted men. Which consisted of The Governor's Troop, The Sheridan Troop, and the First Troop, Philadelphia City Cavalry, all of which served in Puerto Rico during August 1898 with the Squadron New York Volunteer Cavalry.
- The 9th Battalion Ohio V.I., from 1st Brigade to Corps Headquarters Guards (Colored Troops/African American)
- Reserve Hospital Company.

=== 1st Division ===
Brigadier General Francis L. Guenther, U.S. Vols., who had joined the troops at Camp Alger about the 15th of May, 1898, was assigned to the Command of the 1st Division. Being absent on sick leave at the time of the arrival of Major General Matthew C. Butler, U.S.V., Brigadier General Guenther was relieved from the Command of the 1st Division and assigned to the Command of the 3rd Division.

On September 15, 1898, Samuel B.M. Young, Major General of United States Volunteers took command of the division.

==== 1st Brigade, 1st Division ====
Brigadier General Joseph W. Plume U.S.V.

The troops assigned to the 1st Brigade, 1st Division at various times included the following:

- The 1st Regiment, New Jersey Volunteer Infantry, Colonel Edward A. Campbell, Commanding, joined at Camp Alger, Va., May 21, 1898, with a strength of 51 officers and 933 enlisted men.
- The 7th Regiment, Ohio Volunteer Infantry, Colonel Arthur L. Hamilton Commanding, joined at Camp Alger, Va., May 20, 1898, with a strength of 47 officers and 672 enlisted men.
- The 65th Regiment, New York Volunteer Infantry, Colonel Samuel M. Welch, Jr., Commanding, joined at Camp Alger, Va., May 20, 1898, with a strength of 50 officers and 979 enlisted men. In May 1899 the sixty-fifth regiment, National Guard New York, issued orders constituting the armory a military post and naming it "Camp Joseph W. Plume," in honor of the commanding general.
- The 9th Battalion, Ohio Volunteer Infantry, from the 2nd Brigade June 23, 1898. (Colored Troops/African American) to Corps Headquarters Guards.
- The 10th Regiment, Ohio Volunteer Infantry, under Colonel H. A. Axline, joined at Camp Meade, Pa., August 20, 1898, with a strength of 45 officers and 1,246 enlisted men.
- The 1st Regiment, Maryland Volunteer Infantry, under Colonel William P. Lane, joined at Camp Meade, Pa., September 8, 1898, with a strength of 44 officers and 1,211 enlisted men.
- The 35th Regiment, Michigan Volunteer Infantry, under Colonel E. M. Irish, joined at Camp Meade, Pa., September 17, 1898, with a strength of 49 officers and 1,264 enlisted men.

==== 2nd Brigade, 1st Division ====
Brigadier General George A. Garretson, U.S.V. took command on June 8, 1898.

The troops assigned to the 2nd Brigade, 1st Division, at various times were as follows:

- The 6th Regiment Illinois Volunteer Infantry, Colonel D. Jack Foster, Commanding, joined at Camp Alger, Va., May 20, 1898, with a strength of 47 officers and 971 enlisted men. The regiment was mustered into Federal Service at Springfield, Ill., on May 11, 1898; served in Porto Rico from July 25, 1898, until September 7, 1898; and was mustered out of the service of the United States at Springfield, Ill., on November 25, 1898.
- The 6th Regiment Massachusetts Volunteer Infantry, Colonel Charles F. Woodward, Commanding, joined at Camp Alger, Va., May 20, 1898, with a strength of 36 officers and 888 enlisted men. The regiment served in Porto Rico from July 25, 1898, until September 7, 1898.
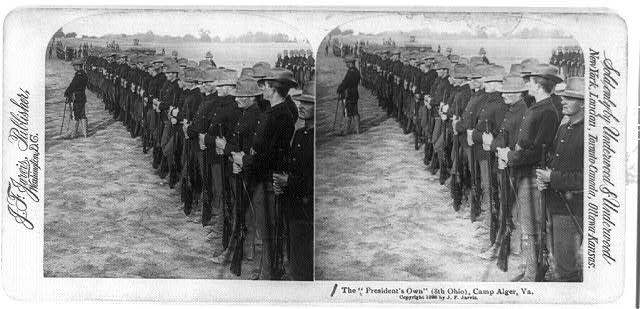
- The President's own (8th Ohio), Camp Alger, Va.
- The 8th Regiment Ohio Volunteer Infantry, Colonel Curtis V. Hard, Commanding, joined at Camp Alger, Va., May 19, 1898, with a strength of 50 officers and 837 enlisted men. Nicknamed "McKinley's Own" or "The President's Own" because three companies were from President William McKinley's hometown of Canton. The regiment served in Puerto Rico from July 25, 1898, until September 7, 1898.
- The 9th Battalion, Ohio Volunteer Infantry, from 2nd Brigade, 2nd Division June 8, 1898, (Colored Troops/African American) to 1st Brigade.
- The 14th Regiment, Pennsylvania Volunteer Infantry, Colonel William J. Glenn, Commanding, joined at Camp Meade, Pa., August 23, 1898, with a strength of 30 officers and 838 enlisted men.
- The 3rd Regiment Connecticut Volunteer Infantry, Colonel Augustus C. Tyler, Commanding, joined at Camp Meade, Pa., September 10, 1898, with a strength of 43 officers and 1,233 enlisted men.
- The 202nd Regiment New York Volunteer Infantry, Colonel Steven Y. Seyburne, Commanding, joined at Camp Meade, Pa., September 14, 1898, with a strength of 42 officers and 1,230 enlisted men.

==== 3rd Brigade, 1st Division ====
Brigadier General John P. S. Gobin, U.S.V. took command on June 24, 1898.

The troops assigned to 3rd Brigade were the following:

The 13th Regiment Pennsylvania Volunteer Infantry, Colonel Henry A. Coursen, Commanding, joined at Camp Alger, Va., May 19, 1898, with a strength of 36 officers and 603 enlisted men.

The 12th Regiment Pennsylvania Volunteer Infantry, Colonel James B. Coryell Commanding, joined at Camp Alger, Va., May 19, 1898, with a strength of 36 officers and 603 men.

The 8th Regiment Pennsylvania Volunteer Infantry, Colonel Theodore F. Hoffmann Commanding, joined at Camp Alger, Va., May 18, 1898, with the strength of 41 officers and 770 men.

The 15th Regiment Minnesota, Volunteer Infantry, Colonel Harry A. Leonhaeuser, Commanding, joined at Camp Meade, Pa., September 18, 1898, with a strength of 46 officers and 1,256 enlisted men.

=== 2nd Division ===
Brigadier General George W. Davis, U. S. Vols. took Command May 29, 1898.

==== 1st Brigade, 2nd Division ====
Brigadier General Mark W. Shaefe, U.S. Vols. took command June 30, 1898.

The troops assigned to the 1st Brigade were:

- The 159th Regt. Indiana V.I., Colonel John T. Barnett, Commanding, joined at Camp Alger, Va., May 24, 1898, with a strength of 50 officers and 976 enlisted men. Ordered mustered out and left for State rendezvous September 11, 1898, for Indianapolis, Ind.
- The 22nd Regt. Kansas V.I., Col. Henry C. Lindsay. Commanding, joined at Camp Alger, Va., May 28, 1898, with a strength of 46 officers and 974 enlisted men. Ordered mustered out and left for State rendezvous September 9, 1898, for Fort Leavenworth, Kan.
- The 3rd Regiment New York Volunteer Infantry, Colonel Edward M. Hoffman, Commanding, joined at Camp Alger, Va., May 29, 1898, with a strength of 44 officers and 973 enlisted men. Ordered mustered out and left for State rendezvous September 12, 1898, for Company armories.
- The 2nd Regt. West Virginia V.I., Colonel D. T. E. Casteel, Commanding, joined at Camp Meade, Pa., August 20, 1898, with a strength of 44 officers and, 1,251 enlisted men.
- The 18th Pennsylvania V.I., Colonel Norman M. Smith, Commanding, joined at Camp Meade, Pa., August 23, 1898, with a strength of 34 officers and 838 enlisted men. Ordered mustered out and left for State rendezvous September 11, 1898, for Pittsburgh, Pa.
- The 203rd New York V.I., Colonel Walter S. Schuyler, Commanding, joined at Camp Meade, Pa., September 12, 1898, with a strength of 44 officers, 1,172 enlisted men.

==== 2nd Brigade, 2nd Division ====
Colonel John W. Schall, 6th Pennsylvania Volunteer Infantry took command by May 31, 1898.

The troops assigned to the 2nd Brigade at various times were:

- The 6th Regt. Penna. V.I., Colonel John W. Schall, Commanding, joined at Camp Alger, Va., May 20, 1898, with a strength of 50 officers and 925 enlisted men.
- The 4th Regt. Missouri V.I., Colonel Joseph A. Corby, Commanding, joined at Camp Alger. Va., May 27, 1898, with a strength of 42 officers and 975 enlisted men.

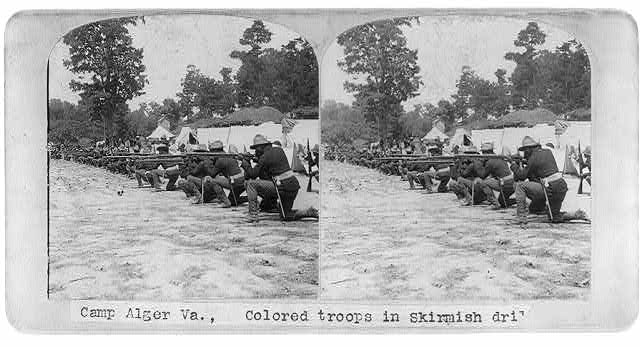
9th Battalion Ohio V. I Colored troops in skirmish drill, Camp Alger, Va.

- The 9th Battalion Ohio Volunteer Infantry, (Colored Troops/African American) Major Charles Young, Commanding, joined at Camp Alger, Va., May 22, 1898, with a strength of 13 officers and 205 enlisted men. to 2nd Brigade, 1st Division.
- The 7th Regt. Ill. V.I., Colonel Marcus Kavanaugh, Commanding, joined at Camp Alger, Va., May 30, 1898, with a strength of 50 officers and 971 enlisted men.
- Battalion 16th Regt. Pa. V.I.. Lieut. Col. George C. Rickards, Commanding, joined Camp Meade, Pa., August 18, 1898, with a strength of 13 officers and 455 enlisted men.
- The 201st Regt. N.Y. V.I., Colonel Henry W. Hubbell, Commanding, joined at Camp Meade, Pa., September 10, 1898, with a strength of 41 officers and 1,213 enlisted men.
- The 5th Mass. Vol. Infantry, Colonel J. H. Whitney, Commanding, joined at Camp Meade, Pa., September 12, 1898, with a strength of 42 officers and 1,263 enlisted men.

==== 3rd Brigade, 2nd Division ====
Brigadier General Nelson D. Cole, U.S.V. took command June 20, 1898.

The troops assigned to the 3rd Brigade, 2nd Division, were:

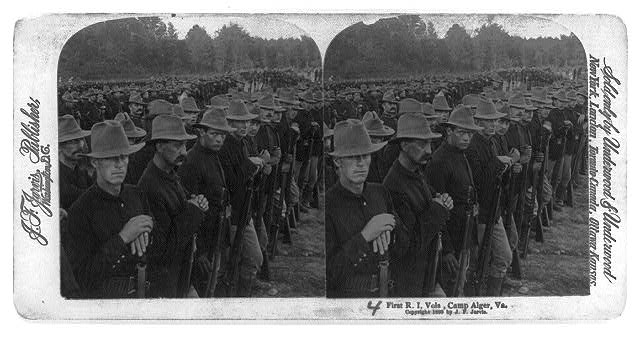
1st Rhode Island Volunteers, Camp Alger, Va.

- 1st Regiment Rhode Island Volunteer Infantry, Colonel Charles Wheaton Abbot, Jr., Commanding, joined at Camp Alger, Va., May 21, 1898, with a strength of 46 officers and 957 enlisted men. To Headquarters. 2nd Army Corps, May 29, 1898.
- The 3rd Regt. Missouri V.I., Colonel George P. Gross, Commanding, joined at Camp Alger, Va.. May 30, 1898, with a strength of 49 officers and 975 enlisted men.
- The 2nd Regt. Tennessee V.I., Colonel Kellar Anderson, Commanding, joined at Camp Alger, Va.. May 30, 1898, with a strength of 47 officers and 945 enlisted men.
- The 1st Regiment Delaware Volunteer Infantry, Colonel J. P. Wickeisham, Commanding, joined at Camp Meade, Pa., August 21, 1898, with a strength of 46 officers and 880 enlisted men.

=== 3rd Division ===
The 3rd Division of the Corps was never fully organized. On June 7, 1898, Brigadier General Francis L. Guenther, U.S.V., was assigned to the command of the 3rd Division, but he was absent sick since May 25, 1898, and never exercised the command.

==== First Brigade ====
On June 9 the separate brigade was assigned as the First Brigade, Third Division.

==== Separate Brigade ====
Brigadier General Henry M. Duffield, U.S.V. took Command June 15, 1898.

The troops assigned to the Separate Brigade were:

- The 9th Massachusetts Volunteer Infantry, Colonel Fred B. Bogan, Commanding, joined at Camp Alger, Va., June 1, 1898, with a strength of 43 officers and 861 enlisted men.
- The 33rd Regiment Michigan Volunteer Infantry, Colonel Charles L. Boynton. Commanding, joined at Camp Alger, Va., May 30, 1898, with a strength of 48 officers and 976 enlisted men.
- The 34th Regiment Michigan Volunteer Infantry, Colonel John P. Peterman. Commanding, joined at Camp Alger, Va.. June 9, 1898, with a strength of 46 officers and 979 enlisted men.

==== Second Brigade ====
Recruit Detachment of the Separate Brigade, Camp Alger, Va., June 27, 1898, after the rest of the brigade was sent to Cuba.

On August 2, 1898, the Second Brigade was organized composed of the:

- 1st Connecticut Volunteer Infantry, Colonel Charles L. Burdett, Commanding, joined at Camp Alger, Va., July 19, 1898, with a strength of 48 officers and 1,273 enlisted men.
- 3rd Virginia Volunteer Infantry.

The troops of the Second Brigade were returned to their states for muster out September 7 and 8.

(see Camp Haskell below)

== Camps ==
=== Camp Alger ===
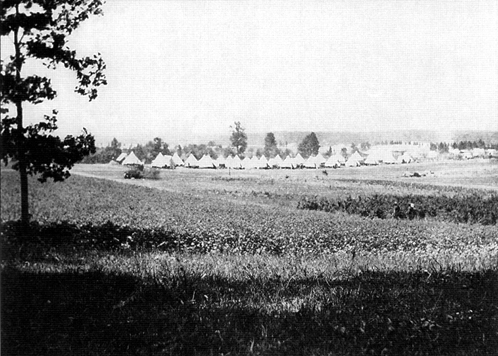
Camp Alger, Virginia, 1898

Camp Alger was established May 18, 1898, near Falls Church, Virginia, and about 1 1/2 miles from Dunn Loring. General Graham arrived May 19 and assumed command. The troops commenced arriving the May 18, and by the last of that month there were 18,309 officers and men in camp. On the last day of June there were 23,511 officers and men, on the last day of July there were 22,180, on the last day of August the troops present at this camp. Total number of troops that went to Camp Alger 31,195.

The number of deaths at Camp Alger from May 18 to October 11, 1898, was 71.

==== Typhoid ====
This death rate is not abnormal, and, judging from it, the locality can not be considered unhealthful. The Seventh Illinois Regiment, which was encamped there during the whole time, lost but one man up to the 14th day of December, a record probably not equaled by any other regiment in the service. The establishment of Camp Alger is justifiable upon the report as to the suitableness of the site, but considering the scarcity of water and the want of facilities for bathing, we are of opinion that it was very undesirable, and was not abandoned too soon.

=== Thoroughfare Gap ===
On August 2, 1898, the 2nd Division of the Second Corps marched to Thoroughfare Gap, 80 miles distant, and remained in camp there for about one month.

The number of deaths and at Thoroughfare Gap was 34.

== At war ==
Only two brigades of the 2d Army Corps saw combat in the Spanish–American War. They left for Santiago de Cuba to reinforce Gen. Shafter's army. An armistice having been reached between the U.S. and Spain ending the war's fighting on August 12, 1898.

The Separate Brigade, 3rd Division 2d Army Corps, under command of Brigadier General Henry M. Duffield, left Camp Alger June 15, 1898. They soon saw action in the Battle of the Aguadores, Cuba. After which the brigade was transferred to the Fifth Army Corps as a provisional brigade, where it remained until the close of the war.

The Second Brigade, First Division of the Second Army Corps, commanded by Brigadier General George A. Garretson, left Camp Alger July 5, 1898. This brigade was instead sent to fight in the Puerto Rico Campaign in the Battle of Yauco and the Battle of Guayama.

== Camps continued ==
=== Camp Meade ===
Battalion (2 companies) 2nd Regt. U. S. Vol. Engineers, Capt. A. H. Weber, Commanding, joined at Camp Meade, Pa., August 12, 1898, with a strength of 7 officers and 180 enlisted men. Capt. Weber was made Acting Chief Engineer of the 2nd Army Corps September 17, 1898. The 2nd U. S. V. Engineers also built Camp McKenzie, Augusta, Georgia before being sent to Cuba on November 23, 1898.

Camp Meade was established August 24, 1898, near Middletown, Pennsylvania. Early in September the remainder of the corps was transferred to the camp.

The number of deaths in this Camp Meade to October 11, 1898, was 64.

=== Winter camps ===
In November Camp Meade was discontinued and the troops not mustered out, distributed to the various camps in the South. The Second Army Corps was directed to hold itself in readiness to proceed to the island of Cuba, with headquarters at Habana; First and Second Divisions at Habana; Third Division at Mariel. This order for service in Cuba was not carried out.

General Graham was relieved November 2, 1898, by Maj. Gen. Samuel B.M. Young, U. S. Volunteers, and the troops were moved to camps in the South, General Young making his headquarters at Augusta, Ga., the distribution being as follows:

==== Camp McKenzie ====
Camp McKenzie, Augusta, Georgia, was originally named Camp S.B.M. Young, after Major General Samuel B.M. Young, U.S. Vols, Commanding Second Army Corps, who had a leadership role in the operations around Santiago. He was to be the camp's commanding officer.

- Headquarters Second Army Corps
- First Division Headquarters
- First Brigade, First Division 10th Ohio, 1st Maryland, and 3rd Michigan
- Third Brigade First Division 13th Pennsylvania, 8th Pennsylvania, 15th Minnesota

==== Camp Fornance ====
Camp Fornance, Columbia, South Carolina, was named for Captain James Fornance of the 13th United States Infantry Regiment who was mortally wounded on July 1, 1898, near Santiago, Cuba, and died of his wounds on July 3. The Camp was abandoned in March 1899.

Third Brigade, Second Division, 1st Rhode Island, 2nd Tennessee, 1st Delaware

==== Camp Marion ====
Camp Marion, Summerville, South Carolina, was named after Brigadier General Francis "Swamp Fox" Marion of the Revolutionary War.

Second Brigade, First Division 14th Pennsylvania, 3rd Connecticut, and 9th Ohio (Battalion)

==== Camp Wetherill ====
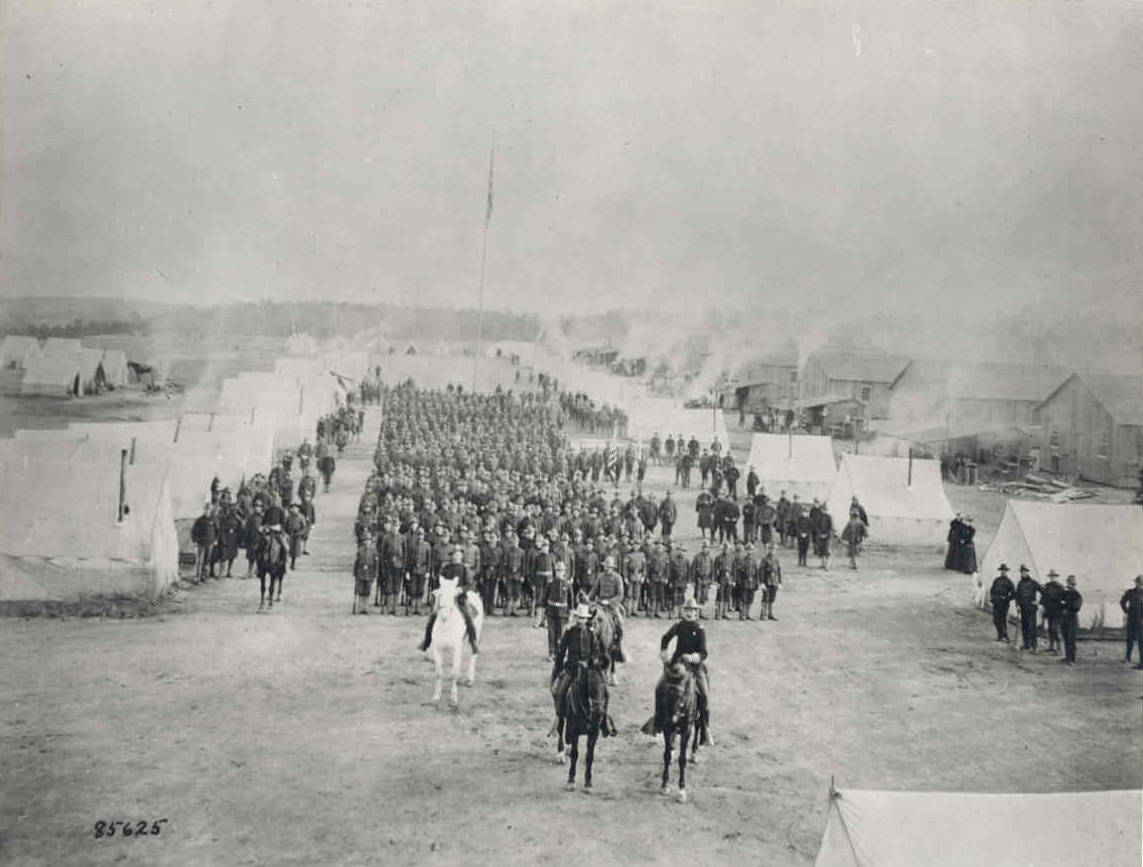
5th MA volunteers near Mill's Mill at Camp Wetherill, 1898

Camp Wetherill, Greenville, South Carolina, was established in November 1898, was named for one of the first soldiers killed at the Battle of San Juan Hill, Alexander M. Wetherill. Photographs of the camp can be view in the Greenville County Library System digital collections.

Headquarters Second Division

First Brigade, Second Division, 203rd New York, 2nd West Virginia, 4th New Jersey

First and Second Brigades of the Second Division, Second Army Corps were designated as the 3rd Division of the 5th Army Corps, but was later reassigned to the 2nd Army Corps.

==== Camp at Spartanburg ====
Spartanburg, South Carolina

- Second Brigade, Second Division 4th Missouri, 5th Massachusetts, 201st New York and was later transferred to Camp Wetherill.

==== Camp Haskell ====
Camp Haskell, Athens, Georgia.

- Headquarters Third Division
- Brig. Gen. George M. Randall, U. S. Volunteers.
- First Brigade, Third Division
- Brig. Gen. William C. Oates, U.S. Volunteers.
- The 15th Regiment Pennsylvania Volunteer Infantry, Colonel William A. Kreps, Commanding, joined at Camp Meade, Pa., September 10, 1898, with a strength of 36 officers and 819 enlisted men.
- 3rd New Jersey Volunteer Infantry
- The 202nd Regiment New York Volunteer Infantry.
- Second Brigade, Third Division
- 3rd Georgia Volunteer Infantry
- 22nd New York Volunteer Infantry

Discontinued January 21, 1899.

=== First Separate Brigade ===
January 16, 1899, the troops at Macon, Ga., and the troops at Albany, Ga., were made a separate brigade of the Second Corps.

Under the command of Brig. Gen. Royal T. Frank, U.S. Volunteers.

- 2nd U. S. Infantry
- 3rd Alabama Volunteer Infantry
- 2nd Arkansas Volunteer Infantry
- 4th Wisconsin Volunteer Infantry

=== Second Separate Brigade ===
Under the command of Brig. Gen. William J. McKee, U. S. Volunteers

- 3rd U.S. Volunteer Engineers
- 7th U.S. Volunteer Infantry
- 10th U.S. Volunteer Infantry
- 3rd Mississippi Volunteer Infantry
- 2nd Missouri Volunteer Infantry

== Disbanded ==
February 1, 1899, the Second Army Corps was ordered to be reorganized and consolidated into two camps, one at Augusta, Ga., and one at Greenville, S.C., the corps to consist of three separate brigades.

General Young remained in command until May 3, 1899, when the Second Corps was discontinued, all of its subdivisions having been disbanded.

== Second Corps Badge ==
General Orders No. 99, War Department, Adjutant-general's Office, Washington, July 15, 1898.

When the land forces of the United States are organized into army corps, divisions, and brigades, the same will be designated by the following symbols, flags, and pennants, and badges, made according to description and designs in the office of the Quartermaster-General:

Symbols

Second Corps, a four-leaf clover.

The corps symbol is worn by enlisted men in the form of a small badge on the front of the campaign hat or in the center of the crown or the forage cap, and upon the left breast by officers. It is of felt of the color designating the division to which the wearer belongs.

Officers and enlisted men belonging to a corps and not attached to a division will wear the corps symbol, of the proper size, In red, bordered in white one-sixteenth of an inch and edged in blue one-thirty-second of an inch. If preferred, officers and enlisted men are authorized to wear the proper badge made of gold or yellow metal enameled in the proper colors.
