= George Whitefield Davis =

US Army major general (1839–1918)

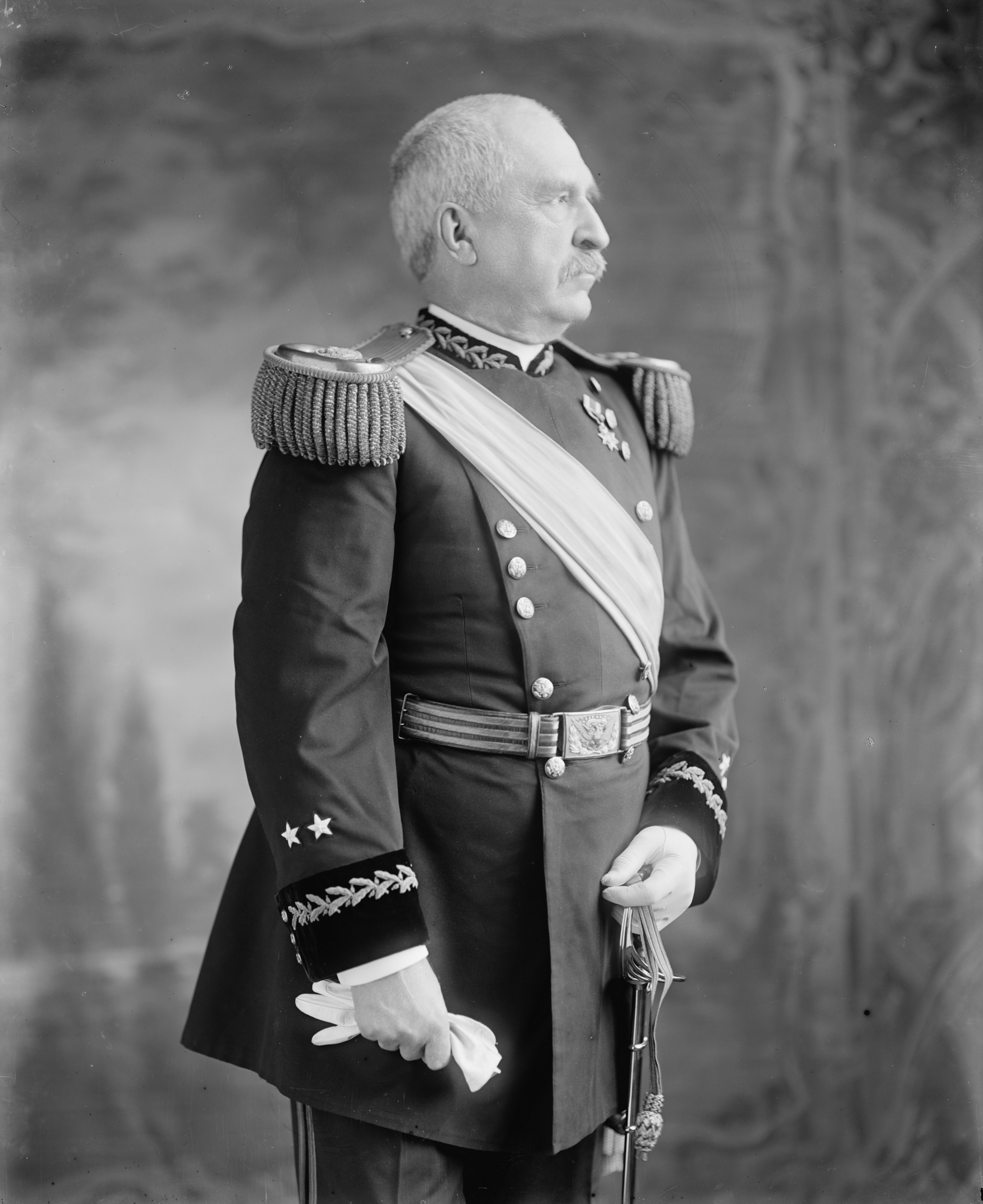

4th Military Governor of Puerto Rico
- In office May 9, 1899 – May 1, 1900
- Preceded by: Guy Vernor Henry
- Succeeded by: Charles Herbert Allen

1st Military Governor of Panama Canal Zone
- In office 1904–1905
- Preceded by: None
- Succeeded by: Charles Edward Magoon

Personal details
- Born: July 26, 1839 Thompson, Connecticut, U.S.
- Died: July 12, 1918 (aged 78) Washington, D.C., U.S.

Military service
- Allegiance: United States
- Branch/service: United States Army
- Years of service: 1861–1866, 1867–1903
- Rank: Major General
- Commands: 2nd Division, Second Corps
- Battles/wars: American Civil War; Spanish–American War

George Whitefield Davis (July 26, 1839 – July 12, 1918) was an engineer and major general in the United States Army. He also served as the last military governor of Puerto Rico and as the first military Governor of the Panama Canal Zone.

== Military career ==
=== Civil War ===
Davis was born in the rural town of Thompson, Connecticut. He first entered the Army during the American Civil War, joining the 11th Connecticut Infantry Regiment in November 1861 as a Company Quartermaster Sergeant (the same position that his grandfather served in during the American Revolution). During the course of the war, he fought in several major battles, including Antietam, and worked his way up in rank in the volunteer force to the rank of major. He was mustered out in April 1866.

=== After the war ===
In January 1867, Davis joined the 14th Infantry Regiment. As a captain, Davis was an assistant engineer on the construction project to build the Washington Monument, and was among the featured guests at the dedication ceremony in 1885.

It was Captain Davis who arranged and perfected all the elevating machinery that carried the stones one after another from the surface of the earth as they went up toward the sky. It was his skill and rare ingenuity that invented the machinery which was so vitally important as a most efficient agent in the rapid and successful prosecution of the work. In the important matter of strengthening and perfecting the foundation of the monument the suggestions and assistance of Captain Davis were invaluable.

— Congressman John Waite,

Afterwards, Davis became vice-president of the construction company that was to build the Nicaragua Canal and chairman of the international board of consulting engineers on the Panama Canal. In 1895, he filled on opening on the Antietam Battlefield Board that helped oversee the preservation and monumentation of that historic place, culminating in the establishment of the Antietam National Battlefield.

With the outbreak of the Spanish–American War, Davis was promoted to lieutenant colonel of regulars and brigadier general of Volunteers. During the period of May 1898 until March 1899, he commanded the 2nd Division of the Second Army Corps at Camp Alger and Thoroughfare Gap, Virginia; Camp Meade, Pennsylvania; and Camp Fornance in South Carolina.

In 1899, he was elected as a Veteran Companion of the Pennsylvania Commander of the Military Order of Foreign Wars. He then served as United States Governor of Puerto Rico and later as United States Governor of the Panama Canal Zone.

He was promoted to major general in July 1902, and retired on his 64th birthday in 1903.

Davis was a chairman of the central committee of the American Red Cross from 1907 to 1915. He died on July 12, 1918, in Washington, D.C.

Preceded by Guy Vernor Henry	Military Governor of Puerto Rico; 1899–1900	Succeeded by Charles Herbert Allen
Preceded by None	Military Governor of Panama Canal Zone; 1904–1905	Succeeded by Charles Edward Magoon
