= 3rd Virginia Volunteer Infantry Regiment (1898) =

3rd Regiment of Infantry, Virginia Volunteers (State service, 1881–1899) 3rd Virginia Volunteer Infantry Regiment (Federal service, 1898)
- Flag of Virginia in use during the existence of the regiment
- Active: 13 June 1881–29 April 1899
- Country: United States
- Allegiance: Virginia
- Branch: United States Army (Virginia Volunteers)
- Type: Infantry
- Size: 46 officers and 955 enlisted men (May 1898)

The 3rd Virginia Volunteer Infantry Regiment was an infantry unit of the United States Army, mustered into Federal service during the Spanish–American War.

The regiment was organized as part of the Virginia Volunteers in 1881 as the 3rd Regiment of Infantry in central Virginia. After being mustered into Federal service, the regiment remained stateside and did not see action in the war. The 3rd Regiment of Infantry was disbanded in 1899 after the 3rd Virginia Volunteer Infantry was mustered out following the end of the war.

== History ==
=== Peacetime service ===
The 3rd Regiment of Infantry was organized on 13 June 1881 from existing separate companies in central Virginia, part of the 1st Brigade of the Virginia Volunteers, with headquarters at Charlottesville. Under the command of Colonel C.C. Wertenbaker, it initially included six companies: Company A (Danville Grays), Company B (Culpeper Minutemen), Company C (Warrenton Rifles), Company D (Monticello Guards), Company E (Lynchburg Home Guard), and Company F (Alexandria Light Infantry). It included ten companies by 1883, mostly armed with breech-loading Springfield rifled muskets: the Lynchburg Home Guard, Danville Grays, Monticello Guards (Charlottesville), Alexandria Light Infantry, Culpeper Minutemen, Warrenton Rifles, Gordonsville Grays, Fredericksburg Guards, Pittsylvania Guards (Chatham), and the Roanoke Rifles.

The regiment fielded 35 officers and 429 men, of which 29 officers and 243 men were present at the first annual inspection of the Virginia Volunteers in 1884. They were armed with 243 .45 breech-loading Springfield rifled muskets and 213 .50 Springfield rifles. By this time, Wertenbaker had resigned as Colonel. In 1885, Company H (Danville Blues) was mustered in, replacing the Gordonsville Grays, disbanded in 1884. On 17 October of that year, the Warrenton Rifles were disbanded due to having fallen below the minimum number of men required by law, reducing the regiment to nine companies. By this point, the Fredericksburg Guards had been designated Company G, the Roanoke Rifles Company I, and the Pittsylvania Guards Company K. At the 1885 annual inspection, 29 officers and 247 men were present, out of a total of 38 officers and 440 men. The regiment was armed with 243 .45 caliber Springfields and 263 .50 caliber Springfields.

On 22 April 1886, Wertenbaker became Colonel again. At the 1886 annual inspection, the nine companies of the regiment fielded 26 officers and 284 men out of a total of 32 officers and 432 men. At the 1887 annual inspection, the eight companies of the regiment fielded 26 officers and 298 men out of a total of 33 officers and 447 men, armed with 439 .34 caliber Springfields. The Roanoke Rifles were disbanded on 10 October of that year. At the 1888 annual inspection, the eight companies of the regiment fielded 26 officers and 296 men out of a total of 33 officers and 445 men. Its headquarters was moved to Culpeper on 15 November 1888, after Nalle was elected Colonel of the regiment. At the 1889 annual inspection, the eight companies of the regiment fielded eighteen officers and 202 men out of a total of 29 officers and 343 men, less Company B. On 30 April 1889 Lieutenant Colonel Grenville Gaines, led the Alexandria Light Infantry and Pittsylvania Guards at the New York City Centennial Celebration, commemorating the anniversary of First inauguration of George Washington. By 1896, it was commanded by Colonel William Nalle and included ten companies: Company A (Danville), Company B (Culpeper), Company C (Farmville), Company D (Charlottesville), Company E (Lynchburg), Company F (Alexandria), Company G (Petersburg), Company H (Danville), Company I (Blackstone), and Company K (Fredericksburg).

=== Spanish–American War service and disbandment ===
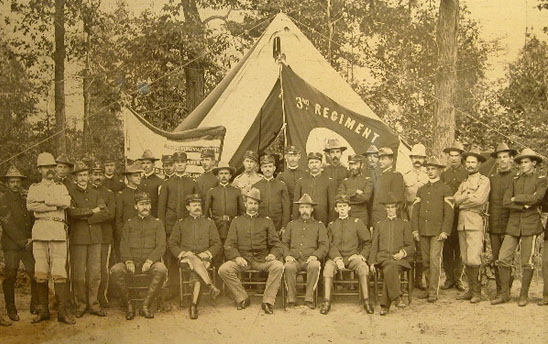
Officers and non-commissioned officers of the regiment, 1898

On 10 March 1898, Nalle was appointed Adjutant General of Virginia; the regiment's Lieutenant Colonel, Warrenton layer Grenville Gaines, was elected Colonel to replace him. The headquarters moved to Warrenton on 12 March 1898. Between 13 and 26 May, the regiment was mustered into Federal service as the 3rd Virginia Volunteer Infantry with 46 officers and 955 enlisted men, one of three Virginia regiments raised for the Spanish–American War in response to the first call for volunteers. Company F of the 1st Regiment of Infantry was mustered in as Company M of the 3rd Virginia. The twelve companies mustered in were: Company A (Danville Grays), Company B (Culpeper Minutemen), Company C (Farmville), Company D (Monticello Guards), Company E (Lynchburg Home Guards), Company F (Alexandria Light Infantry), Company G (Petersburg Grays), Company H (Danville Blues), Company I (Fairfax County), Company K (Washington Guard, Fredericksburg), Company L (Fitz Lee Rifles, Lynchburg), and Company M (Richmond). On 25 May Nalle was appointed Colonel of the regiment, with Gaines resigning simultaneously.

On 5 June the regiment relocated by train to Camp Alger, joining the Second Brigade of the First Division of the Second Army Corps. On 2 August it became part of the newly created Second Brigade of the corps' Third Division alongside the 1st Connecticut Volunteer Infantry. At Camp Alger on the night of 8 August, a white hospital steward from the regiment scuffled with a black teamster. A number of men the regiment formed a lynching party, which was turned back. The behavior of the regiment during the incident angered division commander Major General Matthew Butler, a fellow Southerner, into subjecting the regiment to four roll calls a day due to its insubordination.

On 7 September, after the declaration of an armistice ended the war, the 3rd Virginia left Camp Alger. They arrived at Richmond on the next day and received a 30-day furlough on September 9. After the end of the furlough the regiment was quartered at the Exchange and Ballard Hotels. On 5 November, the regiment was mustered out at Richmond, with 46 officers and 1,222 men. During its service, the 3rd Virginia Volunteer Infantry lost one officer and twelve enlisted men to disease; an enlisted man also committed suicide.

The 3rd Regiment was disbanded on 29 April 1899, and its elements reorganized between 1899 and 1902 as separate companies in central Virginia. In 1905, these companies consolidated with companies formerly part of the 2nd Regiment of Infantry to form the 72nd Regiment of Infantry. In a series of reorganizations, the 72nd became the 116th Infantry Regiment, which perpetuates the lineage of the 3rd Infantry.
