= 84th Ohio Infantry Regiment =

- Active: May 1862 to October 14, 1862
- Country: United States
- Allegiance: Union
- Branch: Infantry

The 84th Ohio Infantry Regiment, sometimes 84th Ohio Volunteer Infantry (or 84th OVI) was an infantry regiment in the Union Army during the American Civil War.

== Service ==
The 84th Ohio Infantry was organized at Camp Chase in Columbus, Ohio May through June 1862 and mustered in on June 7, 1862, for three months service under the command of Colonel William Lawrence.

It was ordered to Cumberland, Maryland, June 11, 1862, and served provost duty there until September. The regiment was attached to Railroad District, Department of the Mountains, to July 1862, and VIII Corps, Middle Department, to September. Moved to New Creek September 13 to repel the attack on that point by Jenkins and Imboden. Moved to Camp Chase, then to Camp Delaware in Delaware, Ohio, and mustered out October 14, 1862.

== Casualties ==
The regiment lost a total of 14 men, 1 officer and 13 enlisted men during service, all due to disease.

== Commanders ==
- Colonel William Lawrence

== Notable members ==
- Private George A. Garretson, Company E – brigadier general in the Spanish–American War
- Colonel William Lawrence – U.S. Representative from Ohio, 1865–1871, 1873–1877
- Private Daniel C. Roberts, Company C – composer; known for God of Our Fathers, a hymn written for the centennial of the United States Declaration of Independence
- Lieutenant William H. H. Miller – United States Attorney General, 1889–1893

== See also ==
- List of Ohio Civil War units
- Ohio in the Civil War
