= John Summerfield Staples =

American Civil War substitute for Abraham Lincoln

John Summerfield Staples (August 14, 1845 – January 11, 1888) was an American soldier who served in the Union Army during the American Civil War. He is notable for having served as the paid "stand-in" for President Abraham Lincoln.

== Biography ==
Staples was born in 1845 in Stroud Township in rural Monroe County, Pennsylvania. During the American Civil War, he enlisted as a private in Company C of the 176th Pennsylvania Volunteer Infantry Regiment in late 1862, but only served a few months due to illness.

Following his medical discharge, he moved to Washington, D.C., where he worked with his father as a carpenter. In late 1864, he was approached by a representative of the president. During the Civil War, it became customary for many citizens to pay for "substitutes" to serve in the army in their place. Hoping to set a good example, President Lincoln selected Staples as his "representative recruit" and offered him a bounty of $500. The nineteen-year-old was mustered in as a private into Company H, of the 2nd District of Columbia Infantry Regiment on October 1, 1864. Staples saw little action during the year he served as the president's representative, primarily working as a clerk and prison guard. He mustered out in September 1865.

Following the war, Staples returned to Pennsylvania.

== Death and interment ==
Staples died in 1888 in Dover, New Jersey, where he had found work in a railroad yard. He was buried in the Stroudsburg Cemetery.

== Honors and memorials ==
In 1910, a bill appropriating funds to erect a memorial to Summerfield was introduced in the United States House of Representatives.

In 1999, the Pennsylvania Historical and Museum Commission and the Monroe County Historical Association erected a historical marker on West Main Street in Stroudsburg to commemorate John Summerfield Staples and his association with President Lincoln.
