= William H. H. Miller =

39th U.S. Attorney General

William Miller
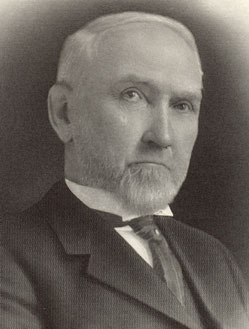

39th United States Attorney General
- In office March 7, 1889 – March 4, 1893
- President: Benjamin Harrison
- Preceded by: Augustus Garland
- Succeeded by: Richard Olney

Personal details
- Born: William Henry Harrison Miller; September 6, 1840 Augusta, New York, U.S.
- Died: May 25, 1917 (aged 76) Indianapolis, Indiana, U.S.
- Resting place: Crown Hill Cemetery and Arboretum, Section 14, Lot 89; 39.8204765°N 86.1756115°W
- Party: Republican
- Education: Hamilton College, New York (BA)

Military service
- Years of service: May–September 1862
- Rank: Lieutenant
- Unit: 84th Ohio Infantry Regiment
- Battles/wars: American Civil War

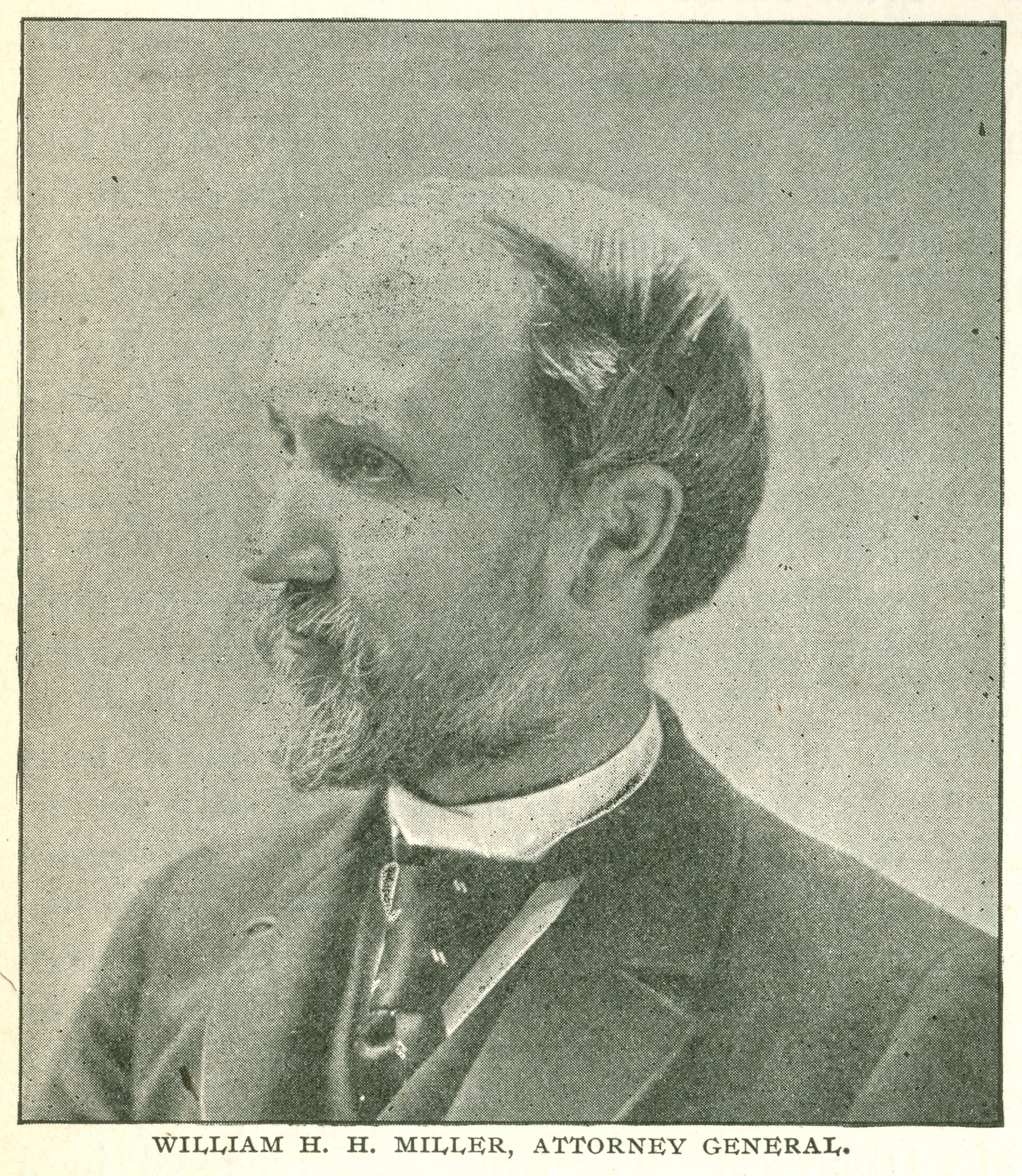
William Henry Harrison Miller

William Henry Harrison Miller (September 6, 1840 – May 25, 1917) was an American lawyer and Attorney General of the United States.

== Early life, education, and military service ==
Born in Augusta, New York, one of the ten children born to Curtis and Lucy (Duncan) Miller, Miller was named for former president William Henry Harrison. At the age of fifteen, Miller began teaching school. He attended an academy at Whitestown, New York, and graduated from Hamilton College in 1861. While at Hamilton, he joined the Delta Upsilon fraternity.

He moved to Maumee, Ohio, and there, in May, 1862, enlisted as a private in the 84th Ohio Infantry Regiment, for service in the American Civil War, and was elected lieutenant. His service ended in September of that year.

After the war, Miller moved to Toledo, Ohio, read law in the office of Morrison Waite, later Chief Justice of the United States, and was admitted to the bar at Peru, Indiana in 1865. He practiced in that city for a short time, and also held the office of county school examiner.

== Legal career ==
In 1866, Miller moved to Fort Wayne, Indiana, where he formed a partnership with William H. Coombs. Upon the retirement of Albert G. Porter from the Indianapolis law firm of Porter, Harrison & Hines, in 1874, Miller was invited to become a member of that firm, which became then the firm of Harrison, Hines & Miller; the senior partner of the firm being Benjamin Harrison. Miller also served as President of the Indianapolis Bar Association from 1884 to 1885, and was "for many years... a trusted advisor" to leaders of the Republican Party in Indiana.

For many years, and particularly during the campaign of 1888, he was a confidential advisor to Harrison. On March 5, 1889, President Harrison appointed Miller United States Attorney General, sending the appointment to the United States Senate along with most of his other cabinet nominations, with the entire cabinet being "confirmed in a ten minute executive session of the senate". At the time of his appointment, it was reported that Miller was "considered a wealthy man, having grown rich in the practice of his profession". Miller served in that capacity for the duration of Harrison's term, until 1893.

As Attorney General, Miller personally handled a number of matters of importance to the administration, including litigation over the status of the Bering Sea, defense of the constitutionality of the McKinley Tariff, and of the Interstate Commerce Act of 1887 and the International Copyright Act of 1891. He also managed the admission of North Dakota, South Dakota, Montana, Washington, Idaho and Wyoming to the Union. Miller also played a key role in the notorious matter of the death of David S. Terry, a former California Supreme Court Justice who was shot and killed by a U.S. marshal while attempting to attack U.S. Supreme Court justice Stephen Johnson Field, who had previously sentenced Terry to six months in jail for contempt of court in connection with a case. Terry had threatened Field, and Miller personally directed the U.S. marshal service to defend Field. When California authorities sought to prosecute the marshal who shot Terry, Miller asserted his authority to protect the safety of the federal judiciary, and personally argued the cause on the Supreme Court, which ruled in his favor.

After his retirement from the cabinet, Miller returned to Indianapolis and resumed active practice as a member of the firm of Miller, Winter & Elam, later succeeded by the firm of Miller, Shirley, Miller & Thompson, and later still Miller, Dailey & Thompson. From 1893 to 1898, he also served as a trustee of his alma mater, Hamilton College.

== Personal life and death ==
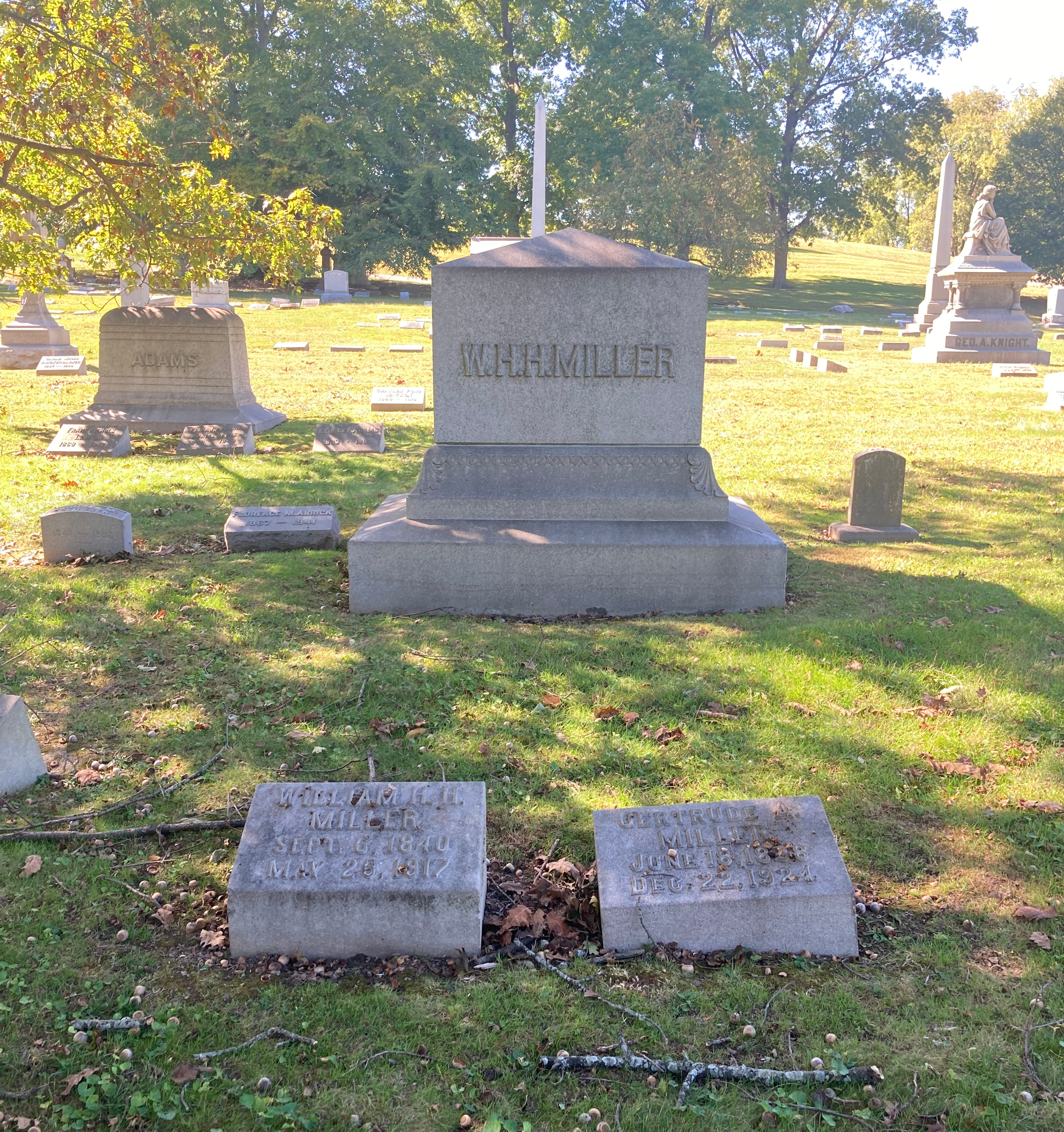
Miller's grave at Crown Hill Cemetery

On December 23, 1863, Miller married Gertrude A. Bunce, daughter of Sidney A. Bunce, of Vernon, New York. They had seven children, of whom three survived their father. Miller died in 1917 in Indianapolis, Indiana, and is buried in Crown Hill Cemetery in that city.

Legal offices
Preceded by Augustus H. Garland	U.S. Attorney General; Served under: Benjamin Harrison; 1889–1893	Succeeded by Richard Olney
