= William Montrose Graham =

United States Army general

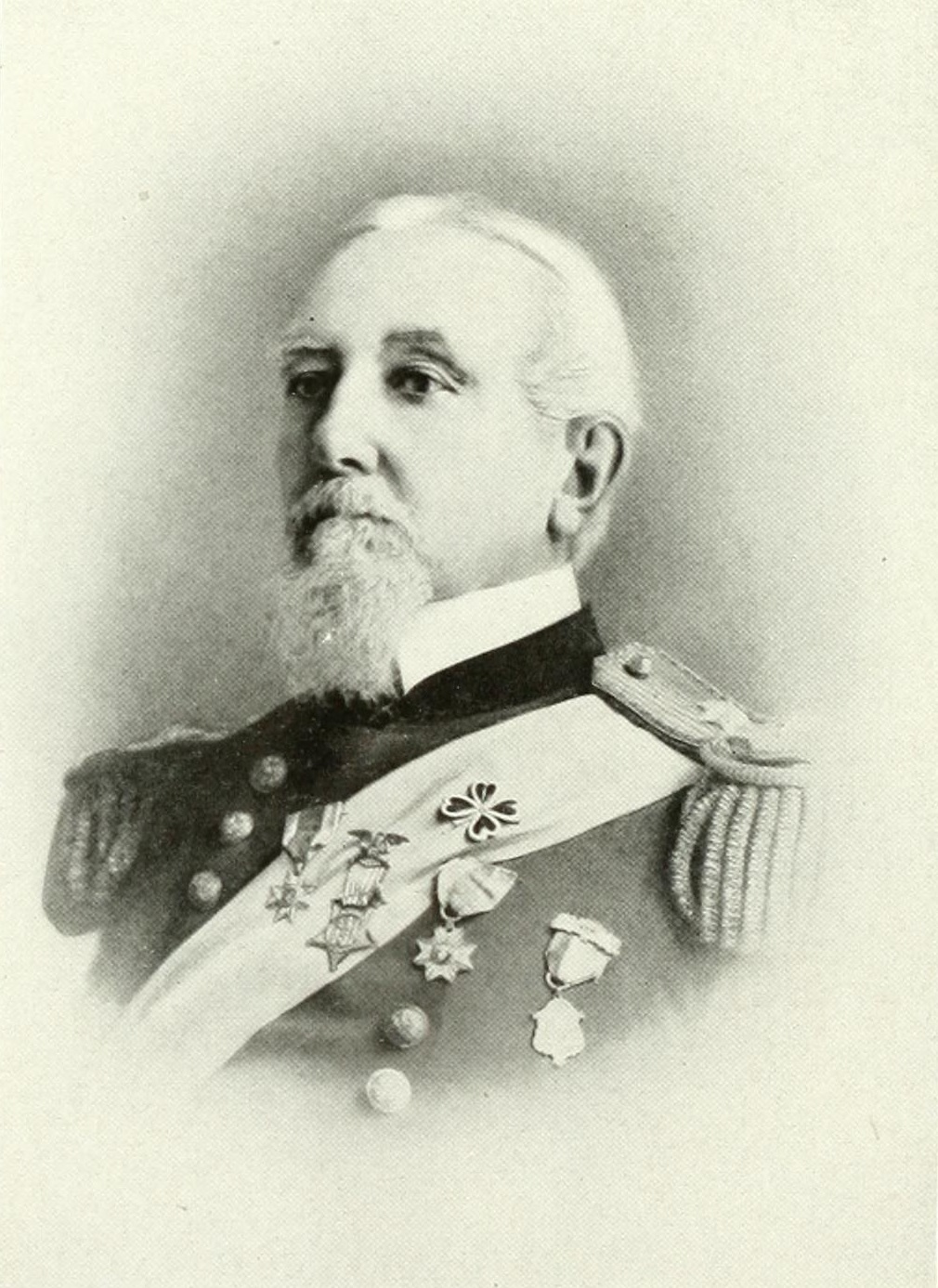
- From Volume 17 (1921) of The National Cyclopaedia of American Biography
- Born: September 28, 1834; Washington, D.C.
- Died: January 16, 1916 (aged 81); Wardour, Maryland
- Burial place: Congressional Cemetery
- Relatives: George Meade (uncle)
- Military career
- Allegiance: United States of America; Union
- Branch: United States Army; Union Army
- Service years: 1855–1898
- Rank: Major General
- Commands: 2nd District of Columbia Infantry; 5th Artillery Regiment; Second Army Corps
- Conflicts: American Civil War: Peninsula Campaign; Battle of Antietam; Battle of Gettysburg; Battle of Malvern Hill; Spanish–American War

William Montrose Graham (September 28, 1834 – January 16, 1916) was a career soldier in the United States Army, reaching the rank of major general. He was a veteran of both the American Civil War and the Spanish–American War.

== Biography ==
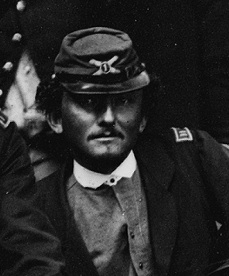
Graham in September 1863. Library of Congress.

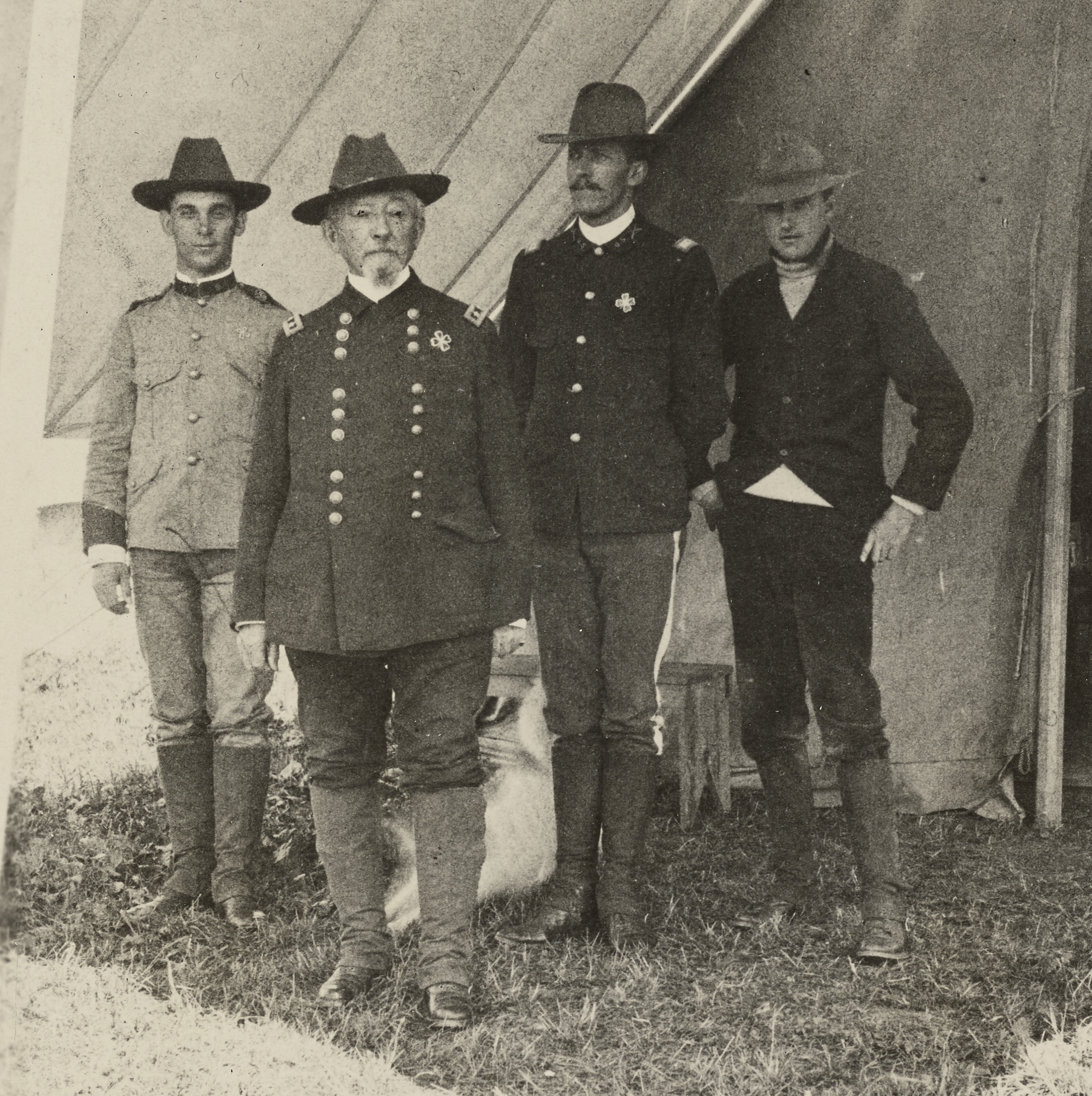
Graham (second from left) flanked by staff officers c. 1898 including Lt. Charles P. Summerall (far left) and Graham's son, a lieutenant (second from right)

Graham was born in Washington, D.C., the son of Colonel James Duncan Graham (1799–1865) and Charlotte Meade (sister of George Gordon Meade). His uncle and namesake, William Montrose Graham (1798–1847), was killed during the Mexican–American War while commanding the 11th U.S. Infantry at Molino del Rey.

Graham was commissioned into the 1st Regiment of Artillery in 1855, and earned two rapid promotions to captain with the outbreak of the Civil War.

During the war, he was cited for gallantry during the Peninsula Campaign, for actions at Antietam, and for his actions at Gettysburg. Graham earned multiple brevet (honorary) promotions for these actions, including major (July 1, 1862, Malvern Hill), lieutenant colonel (September 17, 1862, Antietam), and colonel (July 3, 1863, Gettysburg). His unit, 1st U.S. Light Artillery, Battery K, was, from 1863, part of the famed U.S. Horse Artillery Brigade.

Graham served with the Regular Army until April 1865, when he accepted a commission as colonel of the 2nd District of Columbia Infantry Regiment. Awarded his final brevet of the war, to brigadier general in the Regular Army, he mustered out of the volunteers in September and returned to the regular service.

He remained in the Army after the war, serving with the 4th and 5th Artillery, rising to the rank of brigadier general in the Regular Army (May 26, 1897). At the start of the Spanish–American War in May 1898, he was promoted to major general of U.S. Volunteers. After brief service in command of the Second Army Corps at Camp Alger and Camp Meade, he retired from the Regular Army on his 64th birthday, and was honorably mustered out of the volunteers on November 30, 1898.

In 1898 he became a companion of the Pennsylvania Commandery of the Military Order of Foreign Wars.

He died in Wardour, Maryland, on January 16, 1916, and was buried at Congressional Cemetery in Washington, D.C.

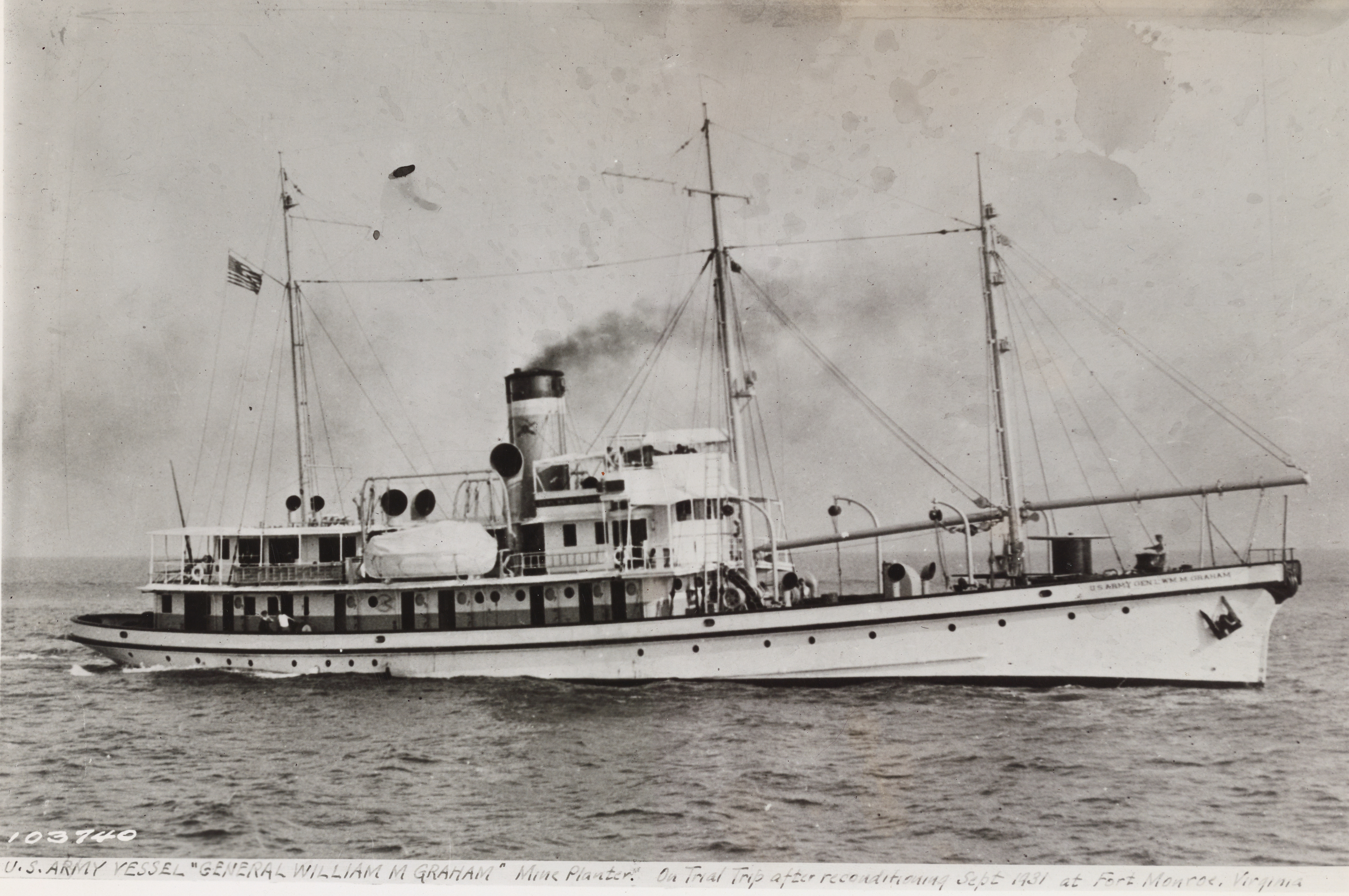
USAMP General William M. Graham in 1931

In 1917 the Army named a new mine planter for General Graham, the USAMP General William M. Graham.

== Personal ==
Graham married Mary Brewerton Ricketts, daughter of Major General James Brewerton Ricketts, in 1860 at Fortress Monroe, VA. Mary was born Aroostine in honor of her Native American heritage and Aroostook County birth. Her family had her name legally changed to Mary due to her father's service in the Indian Wars. Graham and Mary AKA Aroostine had six children. They included Mary Ricketts Graham, who married Vice Admiral Guy Hamilton Burrage; Meeta Campbell Graham, who married Carroll Storrs Alden, head of the English, History and Government Departments at the US Naval Academy and author of several books about US naval history; Harriet Pierce Graham, who married Rear Admiral Archibald Henderson Scales, Superintendent of the US Naval Academy; and Lieutenant William Montrose Graham Jr.
