= 2nd District of Columbia Infantry Regiment =

2nd District of Columbia Infantry
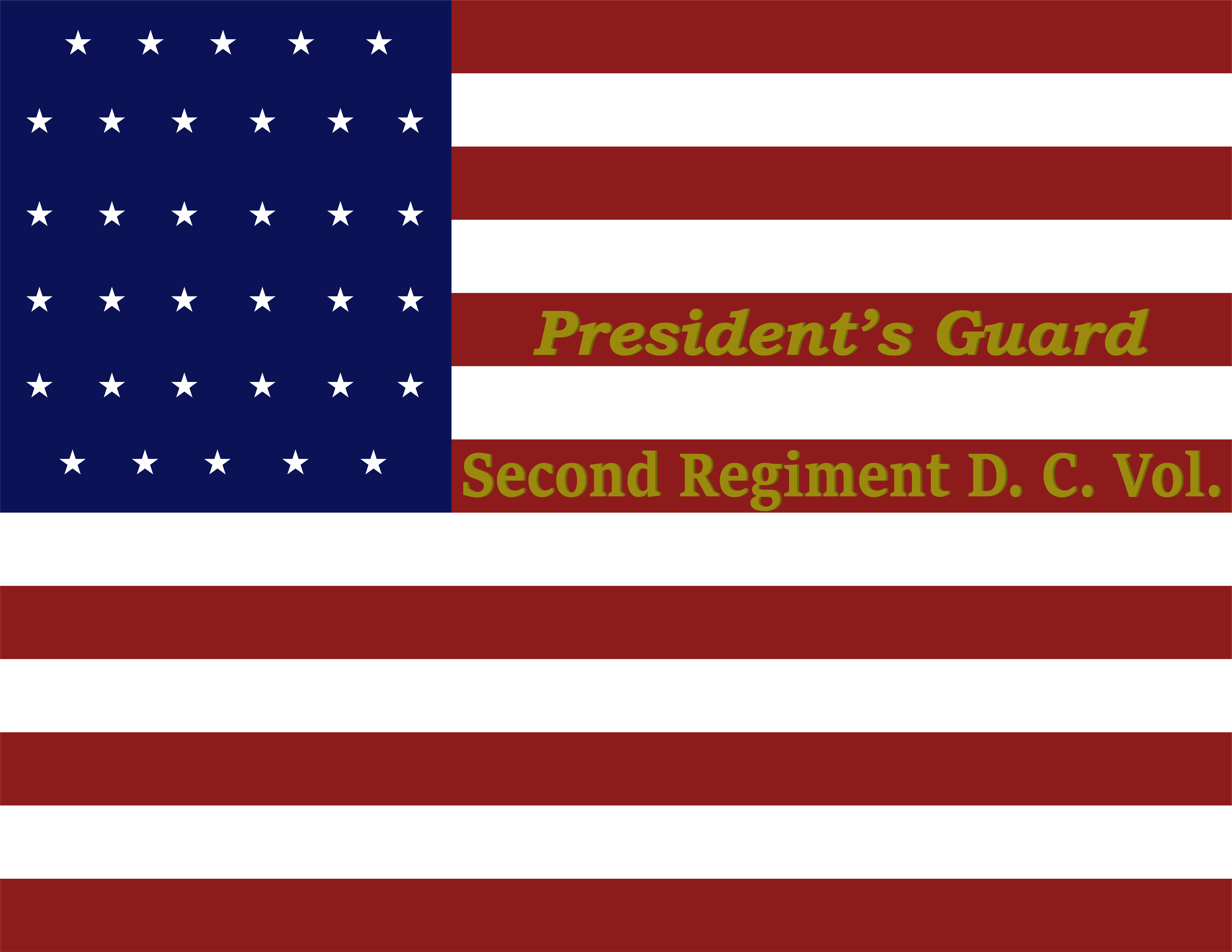
- Reconstruction of the National flag
- Active: 1862–65
- Country: United States
- Allegiance: Union
- Branch: Infantry
- Type: Regiment
- Part of: V Corps, Army of the Potomac; XXII Corps, Department of Washington
- Engagements: Battle of Fort Stevens

Commanders
- Notable commanders: Isaac A. Peck; Charles M. Alexander; William M. Graham

The 2nd District of Columbia Infantry was a Union Army infantry regiment that served during the American Civil War.

== History ==
The regiment was recruited in the District of Columbia and mustered into service on February 26, 1862 and assigned to the defenses of Washington, D.C. The unit's first colonel was Isaac A. Peck, who resigned in June 1862 and was succeeded by Charles M. Alexander, who was promoted to colonel at the same time. During the Maryland Campaign it was assigned to the 1st Division, V Corps of the Army of the Potomac; the division was held in reserve during the Battle of Antietam. The regiment then returned to the garrison of Washington in October. During the Battle of Fort Stevens the regiment was held in reserve. Alexander resigned in February 1865 and was replaced by Colonel William Graham. The regiment was mustered out of service on September 12, 1865.

== Notable members ==
Nineteen-year-old Private John Summerfield Staples of Company H, who mustered in on October 1, 1864, served as the "representative recruit" for President Abraham Lincoln.

== See also ==
- List of District of Columbia Civil War regiments

== Sources ==
- Civil War in the East
- The Civil War Archive
