= George A. Garretson =

American soldier (1844–1916)

George Armstrong Garretson
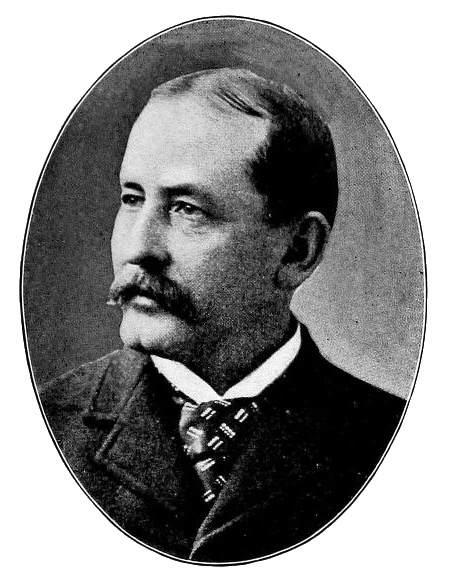
- Born: January 30, 1844; New Lisbon, Ohio
- Died: December 8, 1916 (aged 72); Cleveland, Ohio
- Military career
- Allegiance: United States of America; Union
- Branch: United States Army; Union Army
- Service years: 1862–1870 and 1898
- Rank: Brigadier General U.S.V.
- Commands: Second Brigade, First Division, Second Army Corps
- Conflicts: American Civil War Spanish–American War: Puerto Rico Campaign; Battle of Yauco*; Battle of Guayama

George Armstrong Garretson (January 30, 1844 – December 8, 1916) enlisted as private in the Union Army during the Civil War and later graduated from the U.S. Military Academy at West Point, New York. He returned to duty for the Spanish–American War as a Brigadier-general of U.S. Volunteers. In civilian life he held many prominent positions including President of The Bank of Commerce. National Association; First Vice-President, The Guardian Savings & Trust Company; Trustee, Western Reserve University; Director, The Cleveland Electric Railway Company; Director and Chairman of Board, The Great Lakes Towing Company; Treasurer, The Montreal Mining Company; Director, The Citizens Savings & Trust Company; Director. The Wheeling & Lake Erie R. R. Co.; Director, The Cleveland Stone Company; Treasurer, Cleveland Subdivision Ohio Branch, American National Red Cross, all of Cleveland, Ohio.

== Early life and family ==
Garretson was born at New Lisbon, Ohio. He was the son of Hiram Garretson, who was born in 1817 in York county, Pennsylvania, and was the son of George and Anne (Griffith) Garretson, who in 1820 left Pennsylvania and came to Ohio, settling at New Lisbon, Columbiana county, and Margaret King Armstrong, the daughter of General John and Isabella (McKaig) Armstrong, who removed from Pennsylvania to Columbiana county, Ohio, in 1804. She had three children, and died May 16, 1852. His father, within a few years after his birth, removed with his family to Cleveland, and became engaged in the wholesale grocery business in the firm of Hanna, Garretson & Company.

Garretson was reared in Cleveland, and was given the benefit of exceptional educational advantages. After attending the public schools of Cleveland for two years he entered a first-class private boarding school at Cornwall-on-the-Hudson, New York, where he pursued his studies until the breaking out of the late Civil war. He was married on the 21st day of September, 1870, to Miss Anna Scowden, daughter of the late Theodore R. Scowden. Her death occurred in August, 1886, and on the 5th day of December, 1888, he was married to Miss Emma Ripka Ely, daughter of the late Honorable George H. Ely, one of Cleveland's prominent and deservedly honored citizens. Two children have been born by this marriage, Margaret Ely and George Ely.

== Civil War ==
Garretson was barely eighteen when our Civil War commenced, but he at once enlisted as private in the 84th Ohio Infantry, which was organized at Camp Chase, Ohio, for three months' service. Garretson served from May 26 to September 20, 1862. He then applied for admission to West Point, and was appointed cadet in 1863.

== Post bellum service ==
Upon his graduation from the U.S. Military Academy on June 17, 1867, he received appointment as Second Lieutenant in the 4th U.S. Artillery. He served with that regiment at different posts during the years 1867—68, and in 1869 was appointed Signal Officer on the staff of Major General John Pope, commanding the Department of the Lakes at Detroit, Michigan. In 1869, the Government began preparations for reducing the army to a peace basis, and inactivity and slow promotion being the result Garretson resigned from the service on January 1, 1870, with the permission of General W. T. Sherman, Commander-in-Chief, and with the full understanding that in case of need at any time his services would be tendered to the Government.

== Civil life ==
At his father's desire, he returned to Cleveland and became connected with the wholesale grocery business but in 1875 he entered upon a more congenial business career with The Second National Bank. In this bank and its successor, The National Bank of Commerce, he served as clerk, assistant cashier, cashier, vice-president, and, from 1890 to his death, as its president.

== State militia and the Ohio National Guard ==
Garretson was interested in the State militia, but owing to business reasons was compelled to decline any appointment until 1877, when at the time of threatened riots in Cleveland, he assisted Colonel W. H. Harris, late of the United States Army and a graduate of West Point, in organizing the First Cleveland Troop of Cavalry, of which Colonel Harris was captain and Garretson First Lieutenant. He retained his commission in the above organization until 1884, when, upon the resignation of Colonel Harris, he was elected to succeed him in command of the company. In 1887 the troop became Troop A, Ohio Cavalry in the Ohio National Guard, Garretson remaining in command as captain until 1892, when business interests compelled him to resign and give up military matters, notwithstanding tempting offers of high rank in the State service had been repeatedly made to him. On January 12, 1880, Garretson was appointed Colonel and Aide-de-camp on the staff of Governor Charles Foster, and upon the re-election of the Governor in 1882 was recommissioned for two years, and served until the expiration of his term on January 14, 1884.

== War with Spain ==
At the beginning of the Spanish–American War, he offered his services to President McKinley, and received his appointment as Brigadier General of U.S. Volunteers, May 27, 1898, and took command of the Second Brigade, First Division of the Second Army Corps on June 8, 1898, at Camp Alger in Virginia. The brigade left camp for Cuba on July 5, 1898, but was sent instead to fight in the Puerto Rico Campaign in the Battle of Yauco and the Battle of Guayama. Garretson received his honorable discharge November 30, 1898.

== Organizations ==
Garretson was a member of the Military Order of the Loyal Legion of the United States. He was a trustee of the Lakeside Hospital, and took a strong interest in other charitable and benevolent institutions of Cleveland such as the Red Cross, the Fresh Air Camp, etc. He had always been a Republican in politics, but never had political aspirations. He was an officer in several banking and other business organizations of Cleveland.
