= Kady Brownell =

American vivandière

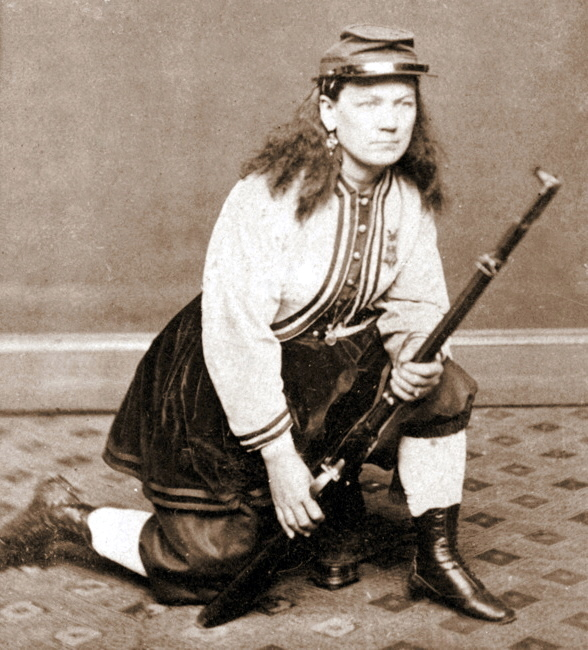
- Brownell with the Union Army, c. 1865
- Born: 1842; Kaffraria, Eastern Cape, South Africa
- Died: 1915 (aged 72–73); Oxford, New York, U.S.
- Military career
- Allegiance: United States
- Branch: Union Army
- Service years: 1861–1865
- Units: 1st Rhode Island Infantry; 5th Rhode Island Infantry
- Conflicts: American Civil War

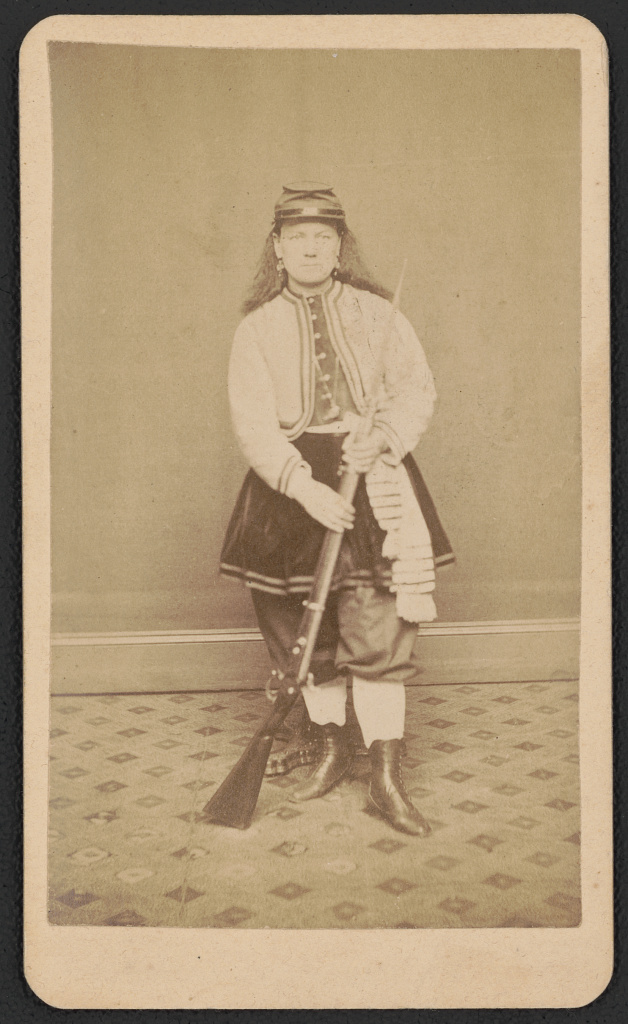
Kady C. Brownell, vivandière associated with 1st Rhode Island Infantry Regiment and 5th Rhode Island Heavy Artillery Regiment with bayoneted rifle

Kady Brownell (1842 – January 5, 1915) was an American vivandière who helped the Union Army during the American Civil War. She went with her husband, Robert S. Brownell, when he joined the 1st Rhode Island Detached Militia regiment. Brownell trained with the soldiers. She fought in battle and helped the injured. At the First Battle of Bull Run, she carried the flag.

== Early life ==
Kady Brownell was born in 1842 in a tent on a British army camp in Kaffraria, South Africa, to a French mother and Scottish father. Her father, Col. George Southwell, was on maneuvers at the time. She was named after her father's friend, Sir James Kady. Her frail mother died shortly after her birth. She was adopted and raised by a couple until they migrated to Providence, Rhode Island, where she was raised by family and friends.

In the early 1860s, Kady worked as a weaver in the mills of Providence, where she met Robert Brownell, whom she married in April 1861.

== Civil War ==
With the outbreak of the Civil War in April 1861, Robert joined the 1st Rhode Island Infantry. Brownell was determined to serve with him. She approached Governor Sprague who agreed to take her along to Washington and there met up with Robert. Colonel Ambrose Burnside, the regiment's commander, appointed her a Daughter of the Regiment and color bearer. She was an active participant in the First Battle of Bull Run in 1861 and, after re-enlisting into the 5th Rhode Island Infantry with her husband, First Sergeant Robert S. Brownell of Company A, at the Battle of New Bern in 1862.

At the Battle of New Bern, Brownell was more than just color bearer. She also saved the lives of a number of soldiers:

Just as a number of Union regiments were getting into their battle positions on the morning of March 14, members of the 5th Rhode Island came out of a clump of woods from an unexpected direction, giving the appearance that they might be a disguised rebel force preparing to attack. Realizing that a misunderstanding might lead the regiments already in line to open fire, and with no fear for her own safety, tradition has it that Brownell—who had moved to the rear as ordered—ran forward into clear view of those already in place, carrying her regiment's flag and waving it wildly until the 5th Rhode Island soldiers' identity became clear to surrounding regiments.

Brownell remained in New Bern, North Carolina, after the battle, aiding her injured husband. Upon his recovery, she was deemed unfit for battle, and not wanting to fight without her husband, both Brownells were discharged.

== Post-war ==
Following the Civil War, Brownell was the only female to receive discharge papers from the Union Army. In September 1870, she became a member of Elias Howe Jr. Post #3 of the Grand Army of the Republic in Bridgeport, Connecticut. She applied for a pension in 1882, and received her $8.00 per month allotment starting in 1884, compared to her husband's pension of $24.00 a month.

After their military service, the Brownells lived in New York City, where she worked for the New York City Parks Department for ten years.

In 1905, she became custodian at the Jumel mansion in the Washington Heights section of New York City.

== Death ==
Brownell died on January 5, 1915, at the Women's Relief Corps home in Oxford, New York. A funeral service was held for her in New York City on January 7, then her body was shipped to Providence, Rhode Island by steamboat for a second funeral service.

Her husband is buried in an unmarked grave site in East Harrisburg Cemetery in Pennsylvania.
