= God of Our Fathers =

1876 American Christian hymn

- by Daniel C. Roberts
- Genre: Patriotic Hymn
- Occasion: 100th anniversary of the signing of the Declaration of Independence
- Written: 1876
- Based on: Acts 22:14
- Meter: 10.10.10.10
- Melody: "National Hymn" by George William Warren

Recording
- Performed by the U.S. Marine Band: file; help

"God of Our Fathers" is a 19th-century American patriotic hymn, whose words were written in 1876 to commemorate the 100th anniversary of the signing of the Declaration of Independence of the United States and whose melody was composed twelve years later in celebration of the 100th anniversary of the adoption of the United States Constitution.

== Lyricist ==
Daniel C. Roberts (November 5, 1841 - October 31, 1907), the author of the words to "God of Our Fathers", was born on Long Island, New York. After attending Kenyon College in Gambier, Ohio, he joined the 84th Ohio Volunteers during the Civil War, serving as a private. At the end of the war, he was ordained as a deacon in the Episcopal Church and later became a priest. It was while he was rector of the St. Thomas Episcopal Church in Brandon, Vermont, that he was asked to write this hymn in honor of the 100th anniversary of the signing of the Declaration of Independence in 1876. Later on, he became vicar of St. Paul's Church in Concord, New Hampshire, for almost 30 years. President of the New Hampshire State Historical Society, he was awarded a Doctor of Divinity degree in 1885 by Norwich University in Northfield, Vermont.

When Roberts submitted his lyrics to the committee tasked with putting together a new Episcopal hymnal, he did so without revealing his name, promising to do so later if they were accepted; when they were approved, they were nonetheless published anonymously. It is the only hymn for which he is remembered.

== Composer ==
When Roberts first wrote the words to "God of Our Fathers", it was sung to the tune of the Russian national anthem. It was not until twelve years later that George William Warren, a self-taught organist, composed a stately tune with trumpet fanfares, known to us as NATIONAL HYMN. His first interest was going into business, but Warren's natural talent led him into becoming a organist; during his career, he served a number of congregations in New York City, composing anthems and editing his own hymnbook, and serving as a professor of music at Columbia University. He wrote GUIDE ME, an alternative tune for "Guide Me, O Thou Great Jehovah". When he died in 1902, under the premise that "no one could play as well as he did" not one single note of music was played at his funeral, which was attended by thousands.
