= Charles Wheaton Abbot Jr. =

American military officer (1860–1923)

- Born: July 8, 1860; Warren, Rhode Island, US
- Died: November 29, 1923 (aged 63) Warren, Rhode Island, US
- Service years: 1881–1918
- Rank: Brigadier General

Charles Wheaton Abbot Jr. (July 8, 1860 – November 29, 1923) (sometimes misspelled as "Abbott") was an American military officer of the late 19th and early 20th centuries. He was commander of the 1st Rhode Island Volunteer Infantry during the Spanish–American War and served as Adjutant General of Rhode Island from 1911 until his death in 1923. He was also a veteran of the Indian Wars, Philippine Insurrection and the First World War.

== Early life ==
Abbot was born in Warren, Rhode Island, on July 8, 1860. He was the son of Rear Admiral Charles Wheaton Abbot Sr., who had served as a pay director in the U.S. Navy during the American Civil War and Annie Frances Smith Abbot. He was also the grandson of Commodore Joel Abbot, a veteran of the War of 1812 who accompanied Commodore Matthew C. Perry on the expedition to open Japan in 1853. He was also a descendant of Brigadier General Nathan Miller who was an officer in the Rhode Island Militia during the American Revolution.

== Military career ==
In 1881 Abbot received a commission in the 12th Infantry as a 2nd lieutenant. Early in his career his postings were mostly in New York and in the Dakotas. He graduated the Infantry and Cavalry School at Fort Leavenworth, Kansas, in 1883. On June 5, 1884, he married Marcia Ransom in Norwich, Connecticut. From 1889 to 1893 he served as the regimental adjutant for the 12th Infantry at Fort Yates in the Dakota Territory.

He was commissioned as colonel of the 1st Rhode Island Volunteer Infantry in May 1898. On June 9, 1898, the board of managers of the Rhode Island Society of the Sons of the American Revolution voted to present Colonel Abbot with a sword and belt. The regiment, nicknamed the "Rough Walkers", was posted in South Carolina and Virginia and was mustered out of service on March 30, 1899, without seeing overseas service.

After his discharge from the Volunteers, Abbot reverted to his permanent rank of captain and returned to the 12th Infantry. From April to December, 1899 he was stationed with his regiment at Luneta Barracks in Manila in the Philippine Islands.

In August 1903 he was promoted to major and reassigned to the 25th Infantry Regiment at Washington Barracks in the District of Columbia. He remained there until his retirement from the Regular Army for disability in October 1904.

After Abbot's retirement from the Army, he returned to Rhode Island and became the military advisor to the Rhode Island Militia. His primary responsibilities were to inspect units of the Rhode Island Militia and to make recommendations to increase their efficiency.

== Adjutant General of Rhode Island ==
In January 1911, Abbot was appointed the Adjutant General of Rhode Island, and was concurrently promoted to the rank of brigadier general. He held that position until his death in 1923.

As adjutant general, he oversaw the mobilization of Rhode Island National Guard units during the First World War and the implementation of the Selective Service Act. From September 1917 until the end of the war, he served as the professor of military science at Brown University. He also oversaw the establishment of the Rhode Island State Guard – a state military force which assumed the functions of the National Guard while the National Guard was in Federal service.

== Honors ==
General Abbot served as Chief Scout of the Rhode Island Boy Scouts from March 12, 1911, to March 10, 1912. He was awarded a Master of Arts degree from Brown University in 1922.

== Death ==
General Abbot died at his home in Warren, Rhode Island, on November 29, 1923. He is buried in the Abbot family tomb in the South Burial Ground in Warren.

== Memberships ==
Abbot belonged to several military and hereditary societies. He served for one year as the commander of the Rhode Island Department of the Sons of Veterans in 1897. On October 18, 1891, he was admitted to the Rhode Island Society of the Sons of the American Revolution and served as it president from 1915 to 1916.

He was also a member of the General Society of the War of 1812, Military Order of the Loyal Legion of the United States, Regular Army and Navy Union, United Spanish War Veterans and the American Legion.

== Military awards ==
- Indian Campaign Medal
- Spanish War Service Medal
- Philippine Campaign Medal
- Rhode Island Militia Service Medal
- Rhode Island Spanish War Service Medal

== Dates of rank ==
No insignia in 1881	Second Lieutenant, 12th Infantry: February 16, 1881
	First Lieutenant, 12th Infantry: September 1, 1887
	Captain, 12th Infantry: April 7, 1888
	Colonel, 1st Rhode Island Volunteer Infantry: May 10, 1898 (Mustered out on March 30, 1899.)
	Captain, 12th Infantry: April 1, 1899 (Resumed prior rank.)
	Major, 25th Infantry: August 12, 1903
	Major, retired list: October 20, 1904
	Brigadier General, Rhode Island Militia: February 1, 1911
	Colonel, retired list: July 9, 1918

Source – United States Army Register, 1923. pg. 1063.
