= Camp George Meade =

U.S. camp during the Spanish–American War

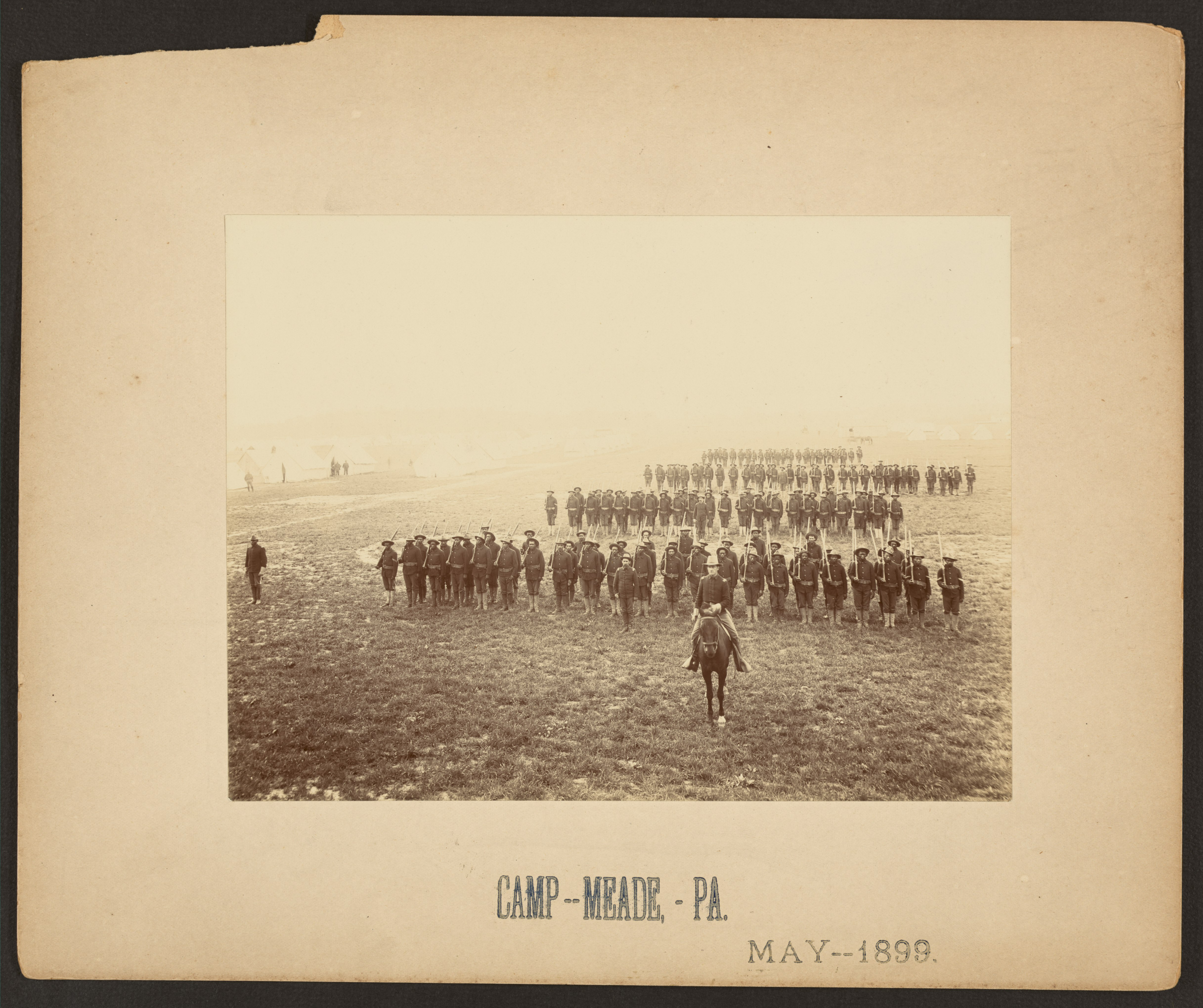
African American soldiers in formation at Camp George Meade, Pennsylvania

Camp George G. Meade near Middletown, Pennsylvania, was a camp established and subsequently abandoned by the U.S. Volunteers during the Spanish–American War.

== History ==
Camp Meade was established August 24, 1898, and soon thereafter was occupied by the Second Army Corps, of about 22,000 men under command of Maj. Gen. William M. Graham, which had been moved from Camp Alger in an attempt to outrun the typhoid fever epidemic. Camp Meade was visited by President William McKinley on August 27, 1898.

It was inspected November 3 and 4, and found to be spacious and well laid out. The water supply was obtained from artesian wells, and was piped to every organization. It was both good and abundant. The hospitals were commodious, and well equipped and conducted. The bathing facilities for the men were ample. The sanitary and other conditions were of high order, and the camp as a whole was open to but little criticism. The testimony of a number of officers and men was taken, and the troops and camp inspected. In November this camp was discontinued and the troops—not mustered out—distributed to the various camps in the South. The number of deaths to October 11 was 64. Camp Meade was abandoned about November 17, 1898. The 3rd Brigade of the 2nd Division of the Second Army Corps was relocated to Camp Fornance, Columbia, South Carolina, and a brigade of the 1st Division, Second Corps to Camp Marion, Summerville, South Carolina.

Part of the camp was reopened in April 1899 for the muster out of a number of volunteer units (2nd, 4th, 5th and 9th U.S. Vol. Inf.) up through June 1899. In addition, several of the new volunteer regiments authorized by Congress in 1899 for the Philippine–American War assembled there during July to November 1899. The Mt. Gretna rifle range was used by these regiments.

== Namesake ==
Named after George Gordon Meade, (1815–1872) a career United States Army officer and famous Civil War general.

== Location ==
The camp was located south of Harrisburg and just west of Middletown. The site is bisected by the east-west Pennsylvania turnpike (76) east-west State Highway 283 and the north–south extension from State Highway 283 to the Harrisburg International Airport. The site is north of the airport in between Middletown and Highspire. The land rises to the north from the Susquehanna River. Much of the area in the north central part of the camp is still semi-rural. Residential areas cover many of the sites south of State Highway 283. Rosedale Road cuts across the site diagonally northwest–southwest. The Penn State University Harrisburg Campus is at the south side of the site and a number of the 1898 camp sites are located on the campus. There is a historical marker on the west side of Pennsylvania Highway 441 (Union Street) at the Middletown Area High School (1155 North Union Street).

== Camp Conewago ==
The 203rd Regiment of the New York U.S. Volunteer Infantry was moved to a quarantine camp at Conewago, Pennsylvania on October 2, 1898, because of the high incidence of typhoid in its ranks at Camp Meade. Conewago is a small town southeast of Middletown. The regiment remained there until it left for Camp Wetherill, Greenville, South Carolina, on November 12, 1898. This camp is sometimes referred to as Camp Conewago. The camp site was near the Conewago railroad station.
