= Dunn Loring, Virginia =

- Census-designated place
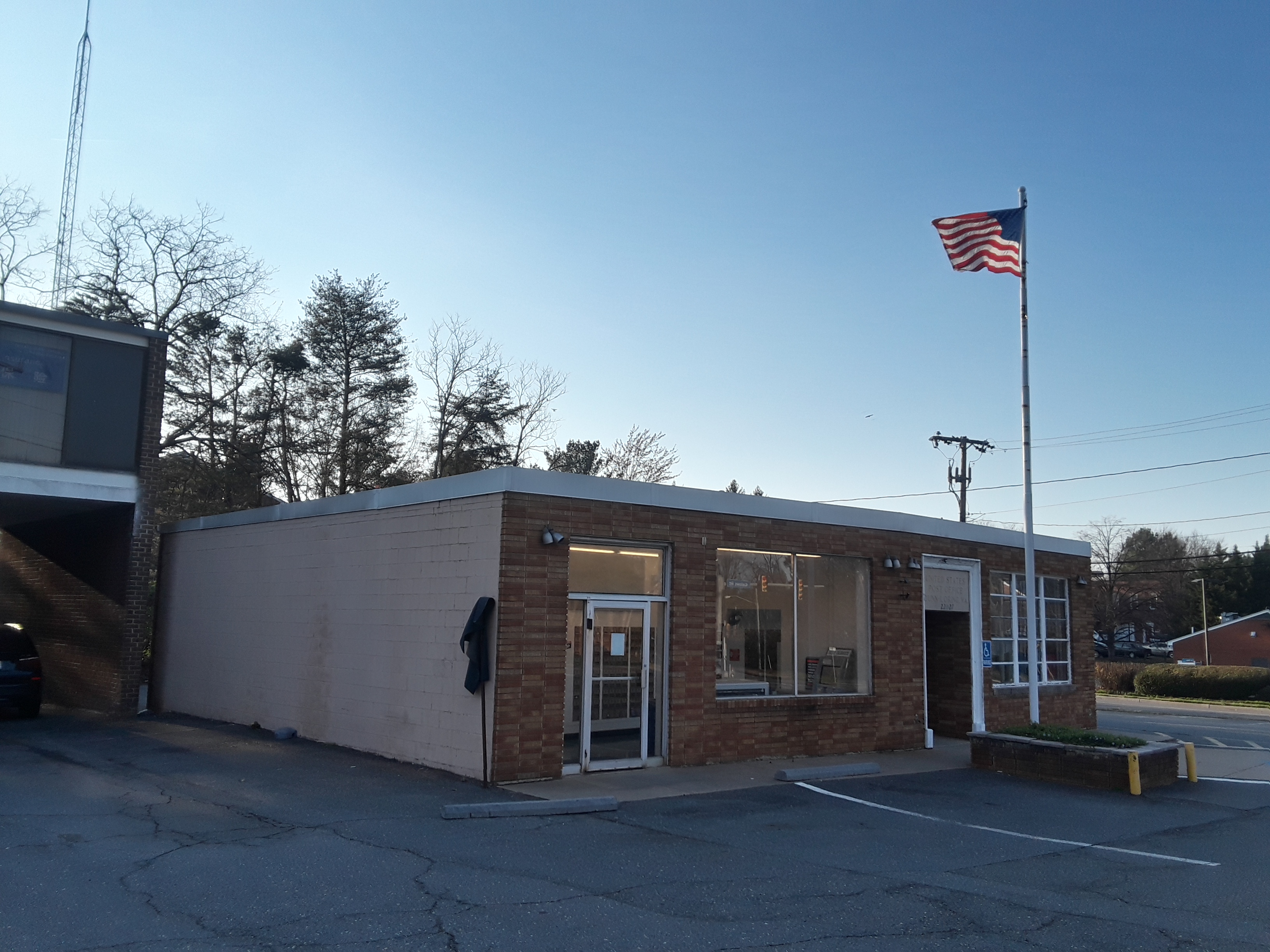
- Dunn Loring post office, April 2019

- Location of Dunn Loring in Fairfax County, Virginia

- Location within Northern Virginia Location within Virginia Location within the United States
- Coordinates: 38°53′31″N 77°13′52″W
- Country: United States
- State: Virginia
- County: Fairfax

Area
  - Total: 2.4 sq mi (6.1 km^{2})
  - Land: 2.4 sq mi (6.1 km^{2})
  - Water: 0 sq mi (0.0 km^{2})
- Elevation: 436 ft (133 m)

Population (2020)
  - Total: 9,464
  - Density: 4,018/sq mi (1,551.5/km^{2})
- Time zone: UTC−5 (Eastern (EST))
  - Summer (DST): UTC−4 (EDT)
- ZIP code: 22027
- Area code: 703
- FIPS code: 51-23984
- GNIS feature ID: 1495484

Dunn Loring is a census-designated place (CDP) in Fairfax County, Virginia, United States. The population was 9,464 as of the 2020 census. This suburban area is bordered by Merrifield to the south, Vienna to the west, Tysons to the north, and Idylwood to the east. Dunn Loring is located within the Washington metropolitan area.

== History ==
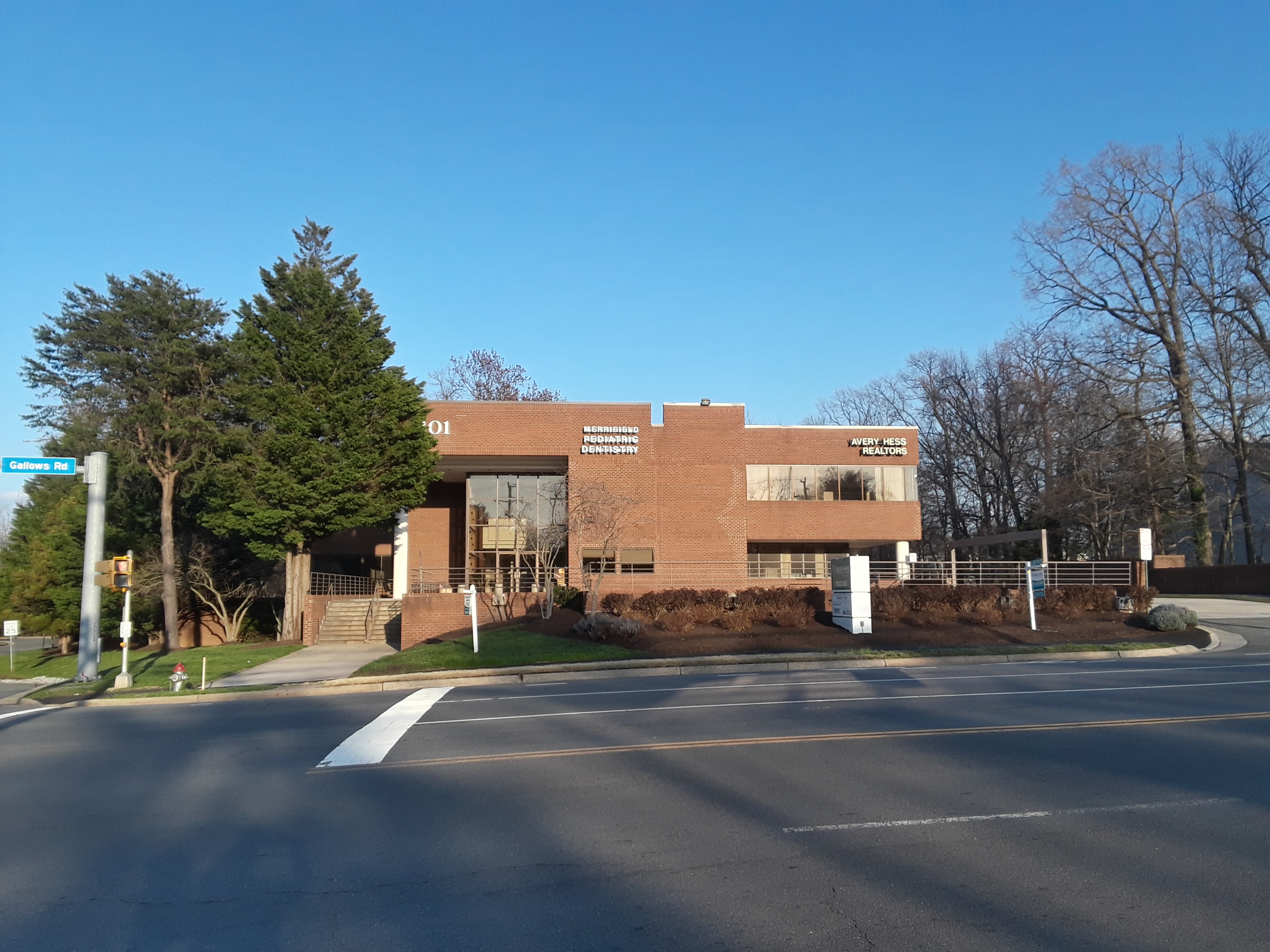
Office building in Dunn Loring

Dunn Loring (archaic "Dunn-Loring"), the earliest platted subdivision in Fairfax County and possibly the Commonwealth of Virginia, was founded in 1886. General William McKee Dunn and his wife Elizabeth Lanier Dunn purchased about 600 acres (2.4 km^{2}) located on the Washington, Ohio and Western Railroad, now the Washington and Old Dominion Regional Trail, from L. B. Clarke and his wife on June 8, 1886. On September 22, 1886, the land was transferred to the Loring Land and Improvement Company, composed of General Dunn, then a retired Army brigadier general and former Judge Advocate General; George B. Loring, a former congressman and Commissioner of Agriculture; and George H. LeFetra, a Washington temperance hotel proprietor. The Town of Dunn Loring was advertised for residential sales in 1887. The Loring Land and Improvement Company built a railroad station and a post office, but shortly thereafter General Dunn died, and the development stagnated. During the Spanish–American War, the founding of Camp Russell A. Alger brought growth and prosperity to Dunn Loring, and among the troops trained at Camp Alger was the celebrated author-poet Carl Sandburg, after whom the present Sandburg Street was named. In 1912, Fairfax Shield McCandlish bought out the interests of the developers, consolidated parcels, and subdivided the land into its current platting. Following World War II, the area began to develop as part of Metropolitan Washington, D.C.

Up until the mid-1990s, large portions of the land (mainly between Lee Highway and Gallows Road) had been horse farms and plantations before being developed.

== Geography ==
Dunn Loring is located in northeastern Fairfax County at 38°53′31″N 77°13′52″W (38.891982, −77.231150). It is bordered to the west by the town of Vienna, to the north by Tysons Corner, to the east by the Capital Beltway, and to the south by Interstate 66. Dunn Loring is 14 miles (23 km) west of downtown Washington, D.C.

According to the U.S. Census Bureau, the CDP has a total area of 2.4 square miles (6.1 km^{2}), all land. Several perennial streams of Accotink Creek's Long Branch stream run through the subdivision.

== Demographics ==
Historical population
Census	Pop.	Note	%±
2000	7,861		—
2010	8,803		12.0%
2020	9,464		7.5%
2020 Census Data

=== 2020 census ===
Dunn Loring CDP, Virginia – Racial and ethnic composition Note: the US Census treats Hispanic/Latino as an ethnic category. This table excludes Latinos from the racial categories and assigns them to a separate category. Hispanics/Latinos may be of any race.
Race / Ethnicity (NH = Non-Hispanic)	Pop 2000	Pop 2010	Pop 2020	% 2000	% 2010	% 2020
White alone (NH)	5,410	5,949	5,482	68.82%	67.58%	57.92%
Black or African American alone (NH)	231	272	397	2.94%	3.09%	4.19%
Native American or Alaska Native alone (NH)	12	10	10	0.15%	0.11%	0.11%
Asian alone (NH)	1,196	1,739	2,248	15.21%	19.75%	23.75%
Native Hawaiian or Pacific Islander alone (NH)	1	6	3	0.01%	0.07%	0.03%
Other race alone (NH)	15	16	62	0.19%	0.18%	0.66%
Mixed race or Multiracial (NH)	220	271	562	2.80%	3.08%	5.94%
Hispanic or Latino (any race)	776	540	700	9.87%	6.13%	7.40%
Total	7,861	8,803	9,464	100.00%	100.00%	100.00%

At the 2020 census (some information from the 2022 American Community Survey) there were 9,464 people, 3,076 housing units and 2,806 households residing in the CDP. The population density was 3,943.3 inhabitants per square mile (1,551.5/km^{2}). The average housing unit density was 1,281.7 per square mile (504.3/km^{2}). The racial makeup of the CDP was 59.68% White, 4.27% African American, 0.18% Native American, 23.77% Asian, 0.03% Pacific Islander, 1.92% from other races, and 10.14% from two or more races. Hispanic or Latino of any race was 7.40% of the population.

Of the households, 75.8% were married couple families, 7.8% were a male family householder with no spouse, and 12.9% were a female family householder with no spouse. The average family household had 3.27 people.

The median age was 42.0, 23.8% of people were under the age of 18, and 16.4% were 65 years of age or older. The largest ancestry is the 12.5% who had Irish ancestry, 35.7% spoke a language other than English at home, and 26.1% were born outside the United States, 77.1% of whom were naturalized citizens.

The median income for a household in the CDP was $238,734, and the median income for a family was $246,716. 5.8% of the population were military veterans, and 78.5% had a bachelor's degree or higher. In the CDP 4.6% of the population was below the poverty line, including 3.9% of those under the age of 18 and 2.6% of those aged 65 or over, with 1.6% of the population without health insurance.

=== 2000 census ===
As of the census of 2000, there were 7,861 people, 2,668 households, and 2,038 families residing in the CDP. The population density was 3,855.9 inhabitants per square mile (1,488.8/km^{2}). There were 2,711 housing units at an average density of 1,329.8 per square mile (513.4/km^{2}). The racial makeup of the CDP was 74.14% White, 3.00% African American, 0.29% Native American, 15.24% Asian, 0.01% Pacific Islander, 4.13% from other races, and 3.18% from two or more races. Hispanic or Latino of any race were 9.87% of the population.

There were 2,668 households, out of which 35.6% had children under the age of 18 living with them, 66.8% were married couples living together, 6.0% had a female householder with no husband present, and 23.6% were non-families. 14.9% of all households were made up of individuals, and 4.0% had someone living alone who was 65 years of age or older. The average household size was 2.90 and the average family size was 3.18.

In the CDP, the population was spread out, with 24.0% under the age of 18, 6.2% from 18 to 24, 34.1% from 25 to 44, 24.8% from 45 to 64, and 10.8% who were 65 years of age or older. The median age was 37 years. For every 100 females, there were 102.9 males. For every 100 females age 18 and over, there were 102.0 males.

Like other surrounding areas in Fairfax County, Dunn Loring is an affluent neighborhood with the median income for a household in the CDP at $204,797 (2013), and the median income for a family at $219,490 (2013). About 0.4% of families and 3.1% of the population were below the poverty line, including 0.7% of those under age 18 and 1.4% of those age 65 or over.

== Transportation ==
Interstate 66 and Interstate 495 form the southern and eastern boundaries of Dunn Loring, respectively, and serve as the major roadways providing access to Dunn Loring.

Dunn Loring is roughly equidistant from Washington Dulles International Airport, 16 miles (26 km) to the west, and Ronald Reagan Washington National Airport, 12 miles (19 km) to the east. It is also served by the Dunn Loring station on the Washington Metro's Orange Line.
