= Camp Alger =

U.S. camp during the Spanish–American War

- 1 1/2 miles from Dunn Loring
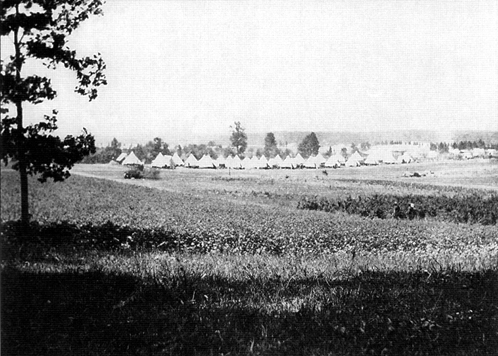

Site information
- Controlled by: United States

Site history
- Built: 18 May 1898
- In use: 1898

Garrison information
- Past commanders: Maj. Gen. William M. Graham
- Garrison: Second Army Corps

Camp Alger, near Falls Church, Virginia, was an army camp established on May 13, 1898, for the Spanish–American War effort. It was originally named Camp Harries for George H. Harries, Colonel of the 1st District of Columbia Volunteer Infantry, but the name was changed on May 23 to honor Secretary of War Russell A. Alger who approved the camp.

The camp was abandoned in early August 1898, by which time the number of troops there had risen to more than 35,000, following a Typhoid outbreak and the War Department put it up for sale in September.

The most notable soldier stationed at Camp Alger was the poet and author, Carl Sandburg and today Sandburg Street, located on the old route from the camp to the railroad depot, is named in his honor.

== Location ==
Camp Alger was about 1 1/2 miles from Dunn Loring, a station on the Washington, Ohio and Western railroad a branch of the Southern Railway; 7 miles from Washington, D.C., and about 5 miles distant from Fort Myer. The surface of this tract is rolling, partly wooded, with cultivated clearings and with good drainage. The soil is of clay and sand and nearly impervious to water. Immediately after the selection of this camp preparations were made for the reception of troops by the erection of storehouses at Dunn Loring, where the Southern Railway put in extra sidings to accommodate the increased traffic. It was built on a 1,400-acre farm called Woodburn Manor.

== Second Army Corps ==
The Second Army Corps was constituted May 7, and May 16 Maj. Gen. William M. Graham, was assigned to the command, and the troops which were to compose the corps were ordered to this camp. General Graham arrived May 19 and assumed command, which he exercised during the existence of the camp. This corps was composed wholly of volunteers. The troops commenced arriving the 18th of May, and by the last of that month there were 18,309 officers and men in camp. On the last day of June there were 23,511 officers and men, on the last day of July there were 22,180, on the last day of August the troops present at this camp. Total number of troops that went to Camp Alger 31,195.

Duffield's brigade left camp June 15 and Garretson's brigade July 5, both for Santiago, Cuba to reinforce Gen. Shafter's army.

== President McKinley ==
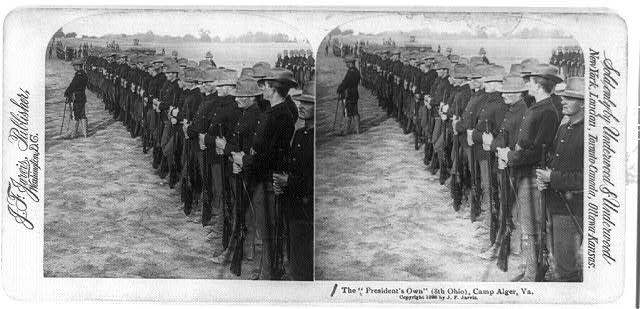
The President's own (8th Ohio), Camp Alger, Va.

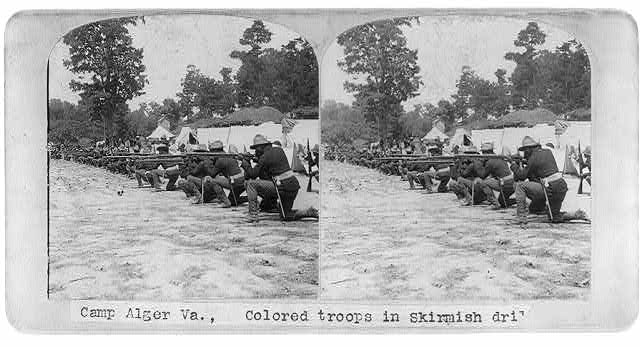
9th Battalion Ohio V. I Colored troops in skirmish drill, Camp Alger, Va.

The 8th Ohio Infantry Regiment, U.S. Volunteers, arrived at Camp Alger on May 19, 1898, was nicknamed “McKinley’s Own” or “The President’s Own” because three companies were from President William McKinley's hometown of Canton.

Another unit from McKinley's home state was the Ninth Ohio Volunteer Infantry Battalion, an African American regiment. At Camp Alger, this battalion was initially assigned to the Second Brigade, Second Division, of the Second Army Corps.

When President William McKinley and his Cabinet visited Camp Alger, on May 28, 1898, two short films were made of this event.

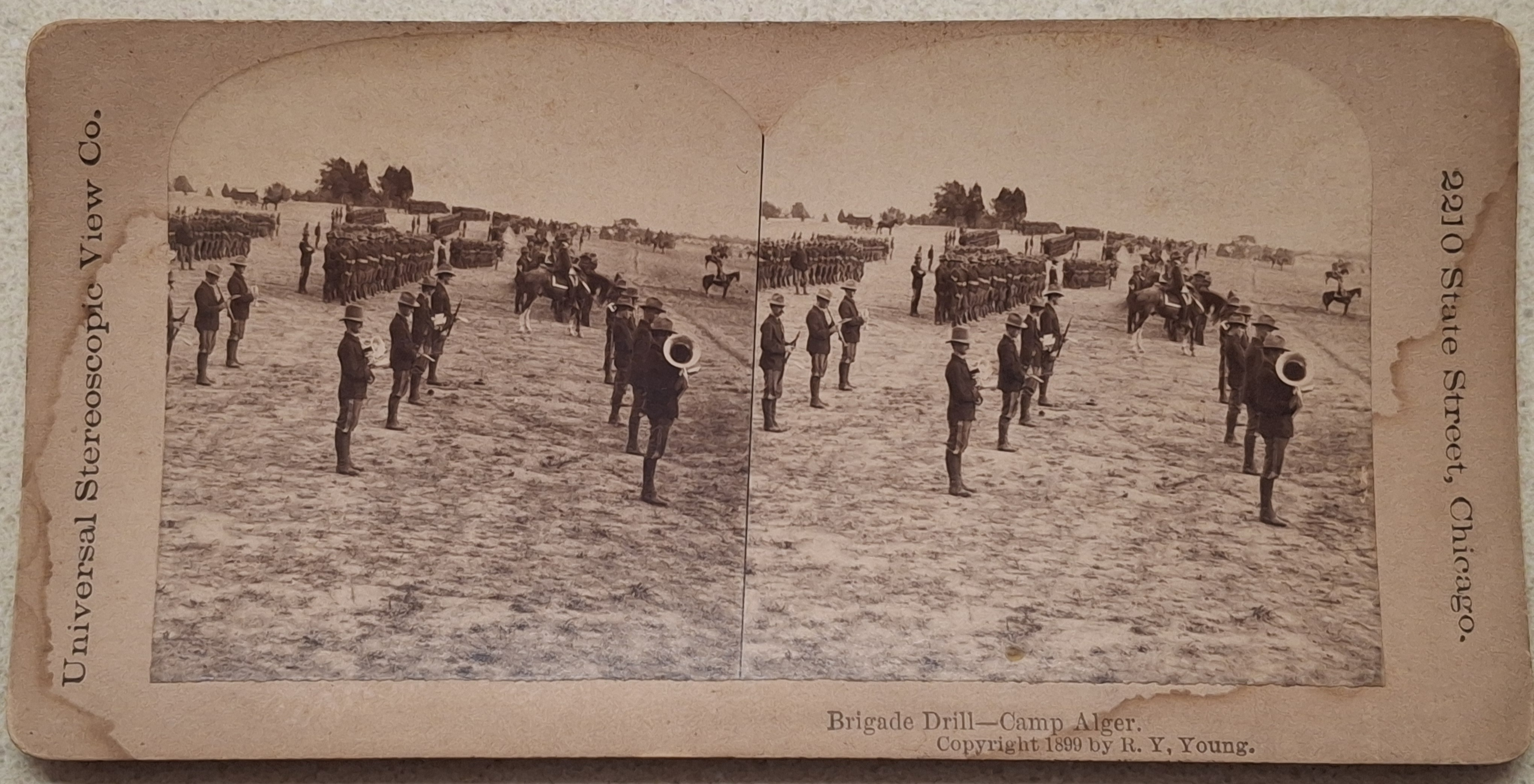
Stereoscopic View of Camp Alger

== Water and sanitation ==
The water supply was quite limited and never was sufficient for other uses than cooking and drinking, and not for that until about the 25th of June, when about forty wells had been sunk. There were no adequate bathing facilities nearer than the Potomac River, which was 7 miles distant. The troops were encamped both in the open and wooded portions. Those in the latter did not seem to suffer on account of their position. The sinks were generally properly policed, of the regulation depth, and were very soon enclosed.

The woods were quite badly polluted by the excreta of the men; but the commanding officer issued stringent sanitary regulations and used great efforts to see that they were obeyed. His efforts were fairly successful. The troops were well supplied with tentage. The camps of the different regiments were well policed, and the refuse properly disposed of by burning. The rations were abundant in quantity and good in quality. Field bakeries were established in the camp and at Dunn Loring on August 2, from which the corps was supplied with excellent bread. As heretofore stated, on 1 August it was decided to reduce the number of troops, one division being sent to Thoroughfare Gap, and about two weeks later it was decided to move the whole corps. Early in September that was accomplished. During the existence of this camp the weather was exceedingly hot and some portion of the time very rainy, both of which conditions, with myriads of flies which infested the camp, were the causes of much discomfort to the men. The health of this locality is reputed to be as good as any in the section of country about Washington.

== Typhoid ==
A defining event of the war and Camp Alger was the typhoid fever epidemic of July to November 1898.

"The number of deaths from May 18 to October 11 was 71, and at Thoroughfare Gap 34. This death rate is not abnormal, and, judging from it, the locality can not be considered unhealthful. The Seventh Illinois Regiment, which was encamped there during the whole time, lost but one man up to the 14th day of December, a record probably not equaled by any other regiment in the service. The establishment of Camp Alger is justifiable upon the report as to the suitableness of the site, but considering the scarcity of water and the want of facilities for bathing, we are of opinion that it was very undesirable, and was not abandoned too soon."

On August 2 the 2nd Division of the corps marched to Thoroughfare Gap, 30 miles distant, and remained in camp there for about one month.

Early in September the remainder of the corps was transferred to Camp Meade, near Middletown, Pennsylvania. A few troops, too sick to make the journey, remained at the camp in hospital tents until October.

== Remnants ==
Nothing remains of the camp. It was sold to William Campbell and became known at times as Camp Alger Farm and the Camp Alger Tract. In 1907 the War Department considered buying it back to create a rifle range, but chose a location in Petersburg, Virginia instead. The land was sold and resold several times in the 1920's before finally being developed in the 1940's and 1950's.

Two historical markers, one on Arlington Blvd. (U.S. 50) near Fenwick St. in Falls Church, near the spot where the Corps Headquarters was and the other on Sandburg Street in Dunn Lorring near the rail depot. There's also a "Camp Alger Avenue" in West Falls Church that recognizes the camp and a Sandburg Street named in honor of Carl Sandburg who was briefly stationed there.
