= Puerto Rico campaign =

Military campaign of the Spanish–American War

- Part of the Spanish–American War
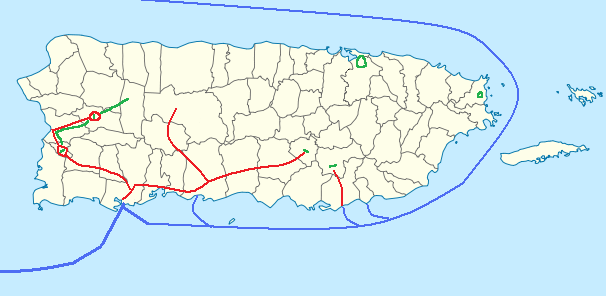
- Map of the Puerto Rico campaign illustrating operations July 25 – August 12, 1898, and showing municipality borders in 1898. Blue are US Naval forces, red are US land forces, and green are Spanish ground forces. Map of Puerto Rico under the US and Spanish flags from August 14 until September 19, 1898. The 23 blue-colored municipalities were under the US flag and the 55 yellow-colored municipalities were under the Spanish flag
Date	May 8 – August 13, 1898
Location	Puerto Rico, Atlantic Ocean
Result	US inability to take the island: End of the Spanish–American War in Puerto Rico, leading to the Treaty of Paris.
Territorial changes	Handover of Puerto Rico from Spain to the United States, and the establishment of the Military Government of Porto Rico.

Belligerents
United States	Spain: Captaincy General of Puerto Rico

Commanders and leaders
Nelson A. Miles; William T. Sampson	Manuel Macías y Casado

Strength
15,472	Spain: 8,000; Puerto Rico: 10,000

Casualties and losses
9 killed 46 wounded	17 killed 88 wounded 324 captured 10,000 surrendered at the end of the campaign

The Puerto Rico campaign was the American military sea and land operation in Puerto Rico during the Spanish–American War, which resulted in the invasion, occupation, and annexation of the archipelago and island by the United States, and the cession of said territory by Spain. The offensive began on May 12, 1898, when the United States Navy attacked the capital, San Juan. Though the damage inflicted on the city was minimal, the Americans were able to establish a blockade in the city's harbor, San Juan Bay. On June 22, the cruiser Isabel II and the destroyer Terror delivered a Spanish counterattack, but were unable to break the blockade and Terror was damaged.

The land offensive began on July 25, when 1,300 infantry soldiers led by Major General Nelson A. Miles disembarked off the coast of Guánica. After winning the first skirmish, the Americans advanced to Coamo, where they engaged Puerto Rican and Spanish troops in battle. With two defenders and four Americans dead, the defenders retreated. The United States forces were able to seize control of Fajardo on August 1, but were forced to withdraw on August 5 after a group of 200 Puerto Rican–Spanish soldiers led by Pedro del Pino counterattacked, while most civilian inhabitants fled to the nearby lighthouse. The Americans encountered more opposition as they advanced towards the main island's interior. They engaged in two crossfires in Guamaní River and Coamo, both of which were inconclusive as the allied soldiers retreated. A battle in San Germán concluded in a similar fashion with the Spanish retreating to Lares.

On August 9, 1898, American troops that were pursuing units retreating from Coamo and Asomante encountered heavy resistance in Aibonito and retreated after six of their soldiers were injured. They returned three days later, reinforced with artillery units and attempted a surprise attack. After about an hour of fighting, Spanish artillery batteries had been silenced. American guns advanced some 2,150 yards and set up positions, but soldiers reported seeing Spanish reinforcements nearby and the guns were withdrawn back to the main line. Shortly before the launch of a flanking movement on the Spanish, all military actions in Puerto Rico were suspended on August 13, after U.S. President William McKinley and French ambassador Jules Cambon, acting on behalf of the Spanish government, signed an armistice whereby Spain relinquished its sovereignty over the territories of Puerto Rico, Cuba, the Philippines and Guam.

== Prelude ==
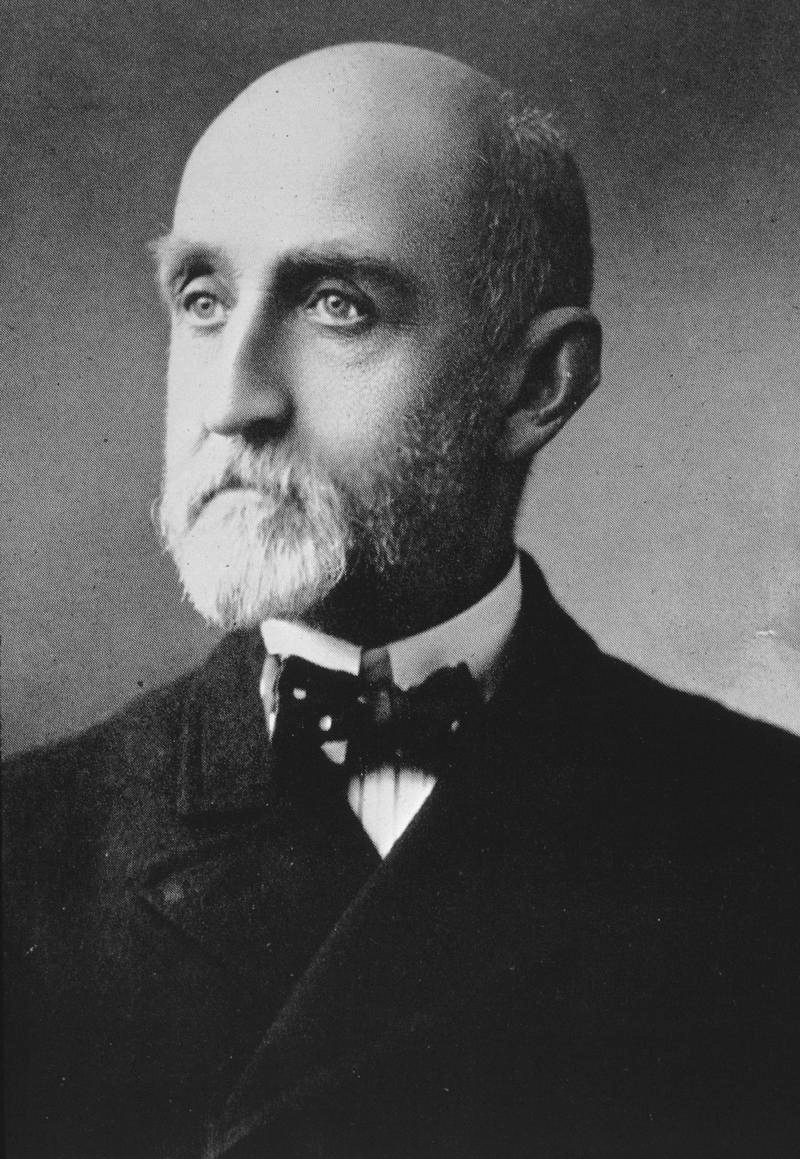
Alfred T. Mahan

In 1890, Captain Alfred Thayer Mahan, a member of the Navy War Board and leading U.S. strategic thinker, wrote a book titled The Influence of Sea Power upon History in which he argued for the creation of a large and powerful navy modeled after the Royal Navy. Part of his strategy called for the acquisition of colonies in the Caribbean Sea that would serve as coaling and naval stations, being strategic points of defense upon the construction of an isthmusian canal.

This idea was not new; William H. Seward, a former Secretary of State for various Presidents, among them Abraham Lincoln and Ulysses Grant, had strongly advocated that a canal be built either in Honduras, Nicaragua or Panama, and that the United States annex the Dominican Republic and purchase Puerto Rico and Cuba. The idea of annexing the Dominican Republic failed to receive the approval of the U.S. Senate, and Spain did not accept the 160 million dollars which the U.S. offered for Puerto Rico and Cuba. Mahan made the following statement to the War Department: "Having therefore no foreign establishments either colonial or military, the ships of war of the United States, in war will be like land birds, unable to fly far from their own shores. To provide resting places for them where they can coal and repair, would be one of the first duties of a government proposing to itself the development of the power of the nation at sea."

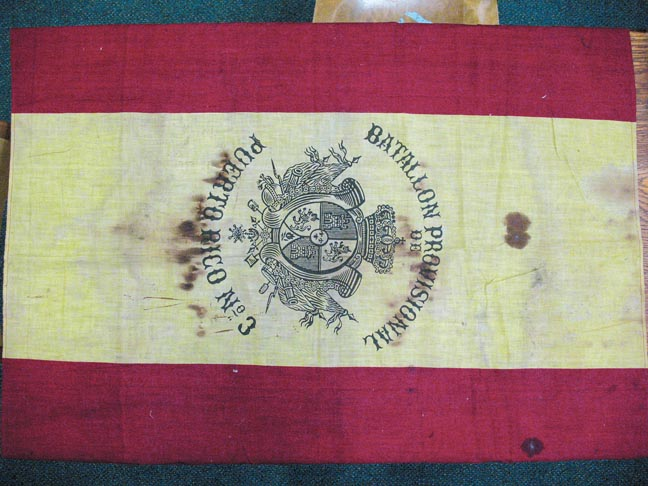
Flag of the Batallón Provisional No. 3 de Puerto Rico (3rd Provisional Battalion of Puerto Rico)

Since 1894, the Naval War College had been formulating plans for war with Spain. By 1896, the Office of Naval Intelligence had prepared a plan which included military operations in Puerto Rican waters. Not only was Puerto Rico considered valuable as a naval station, Puerto Rico and Cuba were also abundant in a valuable commercial commodity which the United States lacked: cane sugar.

On February 15, 1898 USS Maine exploded and sank in Havana Harbor, Cuba. According to the Navy's leading weapons expert, Philip Alger, the explosion was due to a coal fire igniting a reserve magazine of six tons of gunpowder, much of which was already degrading due to the humid climate. However, the United States forwarded an ultimatum to Spain to withdraw from Cuba following the sinking of Maine. In response, Spain broke off diplomatic relations with the United States, and on April 23, 1898, Spain declared war. On April 25, the U.S. Congress declared that a state of war between the United States and Spain had existed since April 20. One of the United States' principal objectives in the Spanish–American War was to take control of Spanish possessions in the Atlantic—Puerto Rico and Cuba—and their possessions in the Pacific—the Philippines and Guam.

On April 27, U.S. ships, the monitor USS Puritan, and the armored cruisers USS New York, and USS Cincinnati, bombarded the Spanish fortifications at Matanzas Bay in Cuba. By July 16, an armistice was signed at the Arbol de La Paz (a large ceiba tree) in Santiago de Cuba by U.S. and Spanish forces ending hostilities in Cuba and its waters. The United States then directed its undivided military resources to Puerto Rico. Two leaders of the Puerto Rican section of the Cuban Revolutionary Party, Julio J. Henna and Roberto H. Todd, had written to U.S. President McKinley asking that Puerto Rico be included in whatever intervention was planned for Cuba as early as March 10. They even provided the U.S. government with information about the Spanish military presence on the island.

On May 24, 1898, in a letter to Theodore Roosevelt, Henry Cabot Lodge wrote, "Porto Rico is not forgotten and we mean to have it".

=== Spanish preparations ===
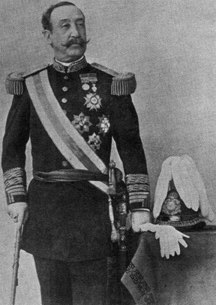
Manuel Macías y Casado

On April 21, 1898, the Gaceta de Puerto Rico published a decree of the Spanish-appointed governor of Puerto Rico, Manuel Macías y Casado, which proclaimed martial law for the island, suspending all constitutional rights in preparation for war., declared martial law, resolving to resist the American forces. Casado declared that "Providence will not permit that in these countries which were discovered by the Spanish nation the echo of our language should ever cease to be heard, nor that our flag should disappear before the eyes. ... Long live Puerto Rico, always Spanish. Long live Spain." Casado hoped that a grant of autonomy would ensure that Puerto Ricans would remain loyal to the Spanish Crown.

With the outbreak of war, the Spanish Crown sent the 1st, 2nd, and 3rd Puerto Rican provisional battalions to defend Cuba against the Americans, depleting Puerto Rico's defenses. The 1st Puerto Rican Provisional Battalion, composed of the Talavera Cavalry and Krupp artillery, was sent to Santiago de Cuba where they battled the American forces in the Battle of San Juan Hill, and suffered a total of 70 casualties.

=== American preparations ===
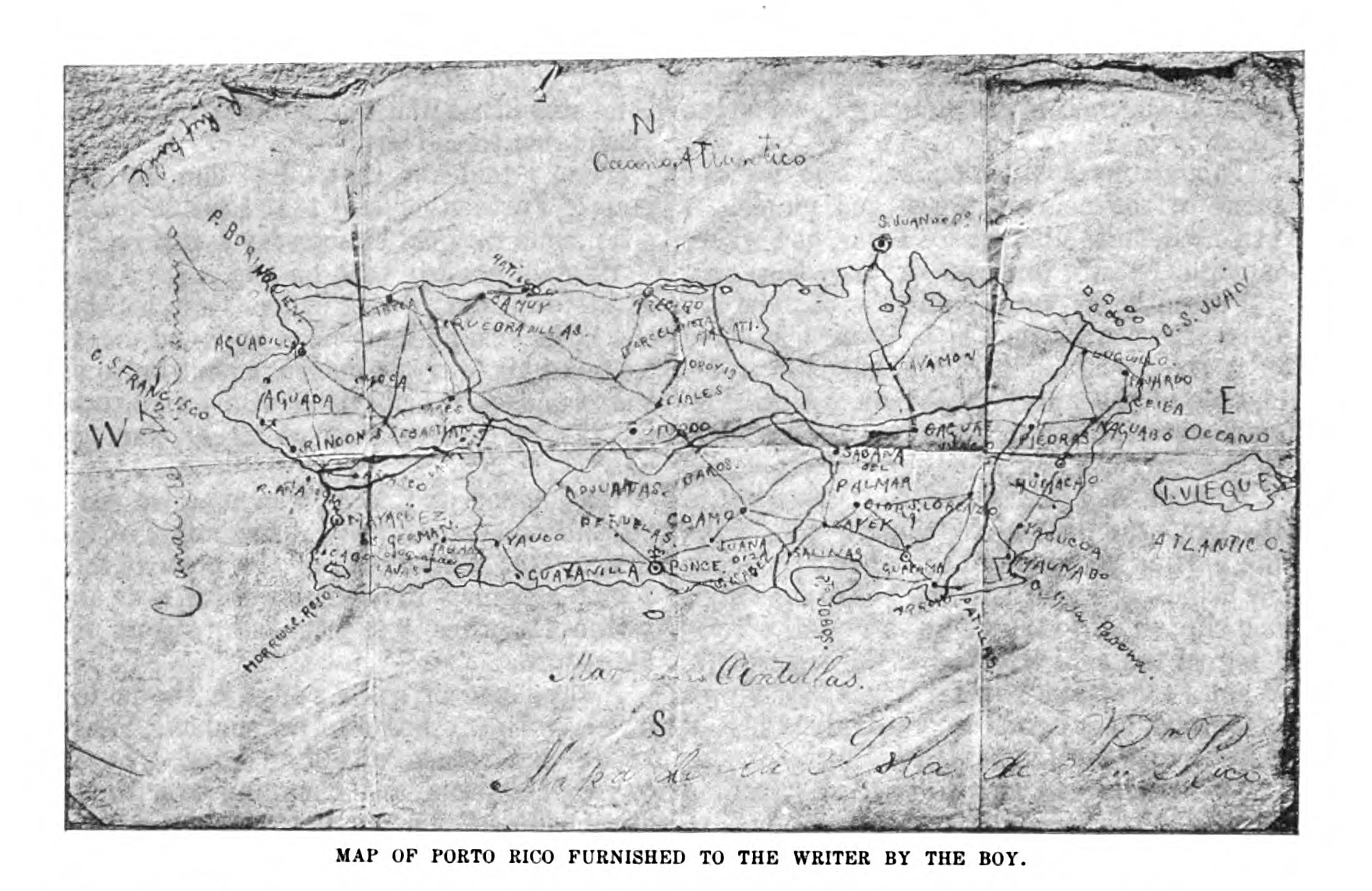
Map drawn by Rudolph Riefkohl and given to Edwin Emerson Jr.

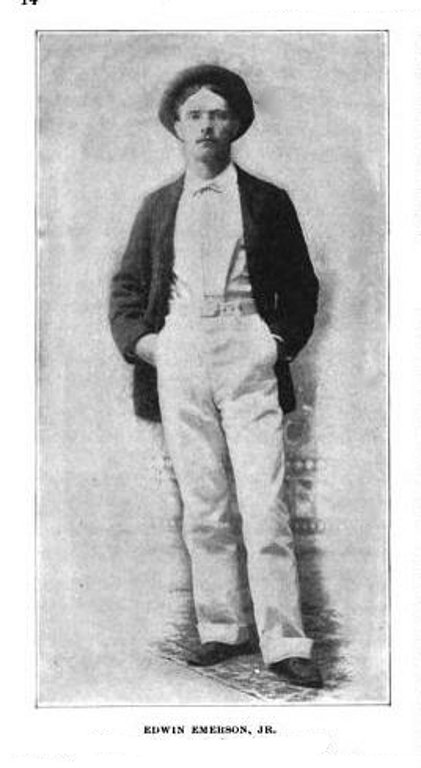
Edwin Emerson Jr.

In the months leading up to the Puerto Rico campaign of the Spanish–American War, the Spanish Crown remained largely unaware that the United States had already begun covert preparations on the island. American military intelligence had successfully inserted a network of spies to gather information on key ports, coastal defenses, and local terrain. Among these operatives were Henry Howard Whitney, Henry Ward, George Bronson Brea, William Freeman, James Dewel, Frederick Ober, and Edwin Emerson, Jr.. Their intelligence would play a crucial role in shaping the U.S. invasion strategy.

One particularly notable episode involved Emerson Jr., who, according to an article in Century magazine in September 1898, assumed the guise of a German journalist to gain access to sensitive information. Posing as a reporter, he approached the German consul in St. Thomas and requested the names of Puerto Ricans of German descent whom he could interview. Among the names provided was the Riefkohl family of Maunabo.

Upon arriving in Maunabo, Emerson met 14-year-old Rudolph W. Riefkohl and inquired, in German, whether he possessed a map of Puerto Rico, claiming that he had lost his own. Young Riefkohl confirmed that he had a map, though it was too large for Emerson's use. Unaware of Emerson's true purpose, Riefkohl returned home and quickly produced a new, smaller map highlighting the major ports and harbors of the island. This map was then handed to Emerson, who used it to assist U.S. military planning.

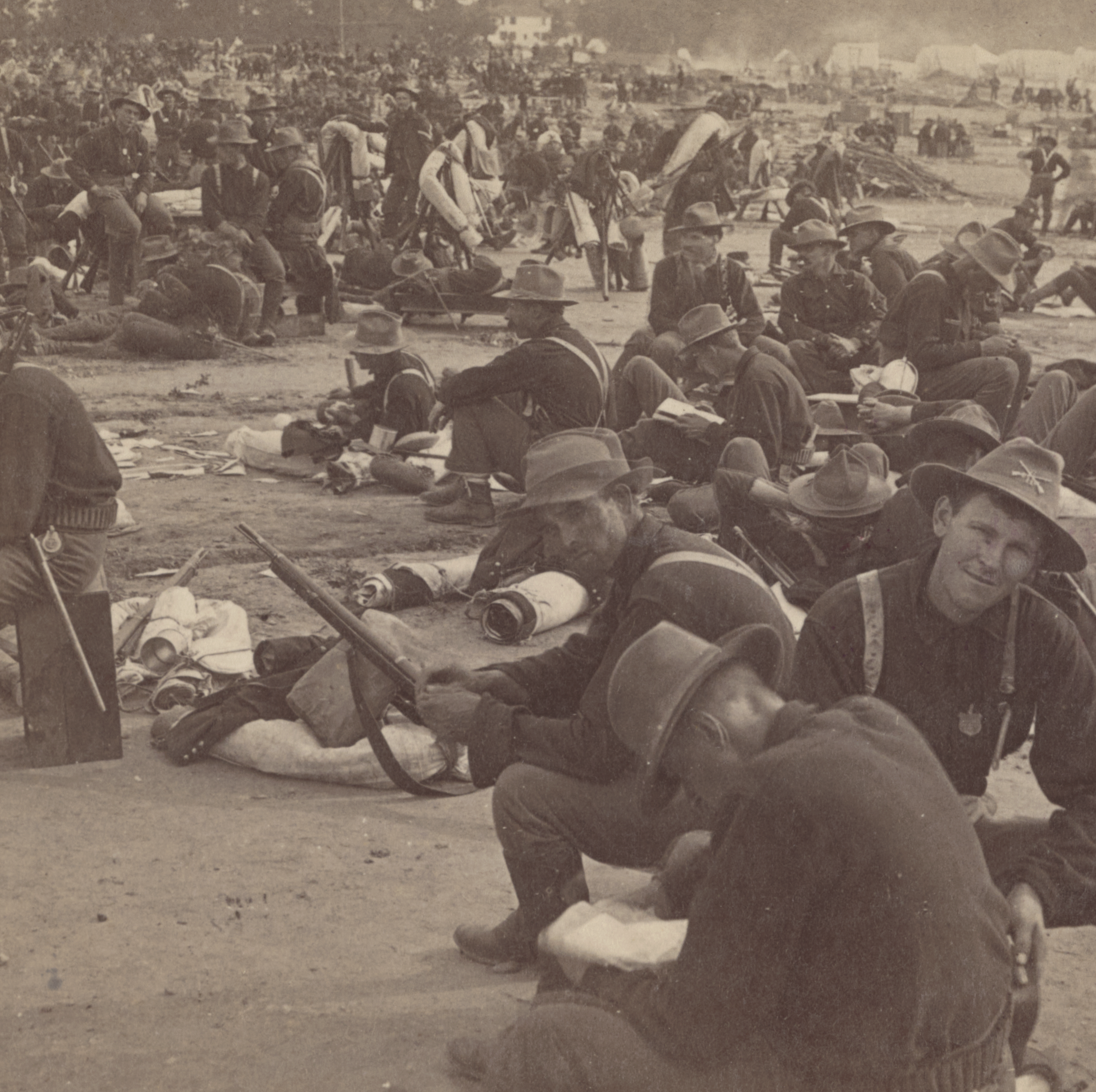
6th Illinois Volunteer Infantry leaving Camp Alger.

It is believed by some historians that Emerson later provided the map to the U.S. Army commanding general, Nelson A. Miles, potentially influencing the selection of landing points for the invasion. The significance of this act was later documented when a photostatic copy of Riefkohl's map appeared in the Century article, providing one of the earliest visual records of the intelligence work carried out by American spies in Puerto Rico.

This careful blend of espionage, local cooperation, and strategic reconnaissance ensured that when U.S. forces, including the 6th Illinois Volunteer Infantry, departed Camp Alger to join General Miles in Puerto Rico, they did so with an unprecedented level of intelligence about the island's geography and defensive positions.

== Naval campaign in Puerto Rico (May 8–August 13) ==
=== First actions ===
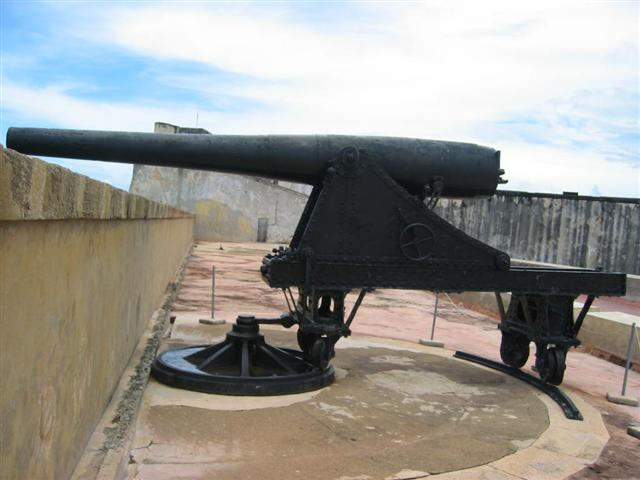
Ordoñez 15 cm cannon which opened fire on USS Yale

The first engagement between the belligerents occurred on May 8, 1898, when the converted liner USS Yale captured a Spanish freighter, Rita, in San Juan Bay. On May 9, Yale fought a brief battle with Alfonso XIII, a Spanish auxiliary cruiser, resulting in a Spanish victory. Around this time, Captain Ángel Rivero Méndez was assigned the command of the Spanish forces at the Fortress of San Cristóbal in San Juan. On May 10, when Yale returned to San Juan Bay, Rivero-Méndez ordered his men to open fire on the steamer with an Ordoñez 15-centimeter cannon, the first combat in Puerto Rico of the Spanish–American War. For his actions, Rivero-Mendez was awarded the Cruz de la Orden de Mérito Militar (the Cross of the Order of the Military Merit) first class.

=== Bombardment of San Juan ===
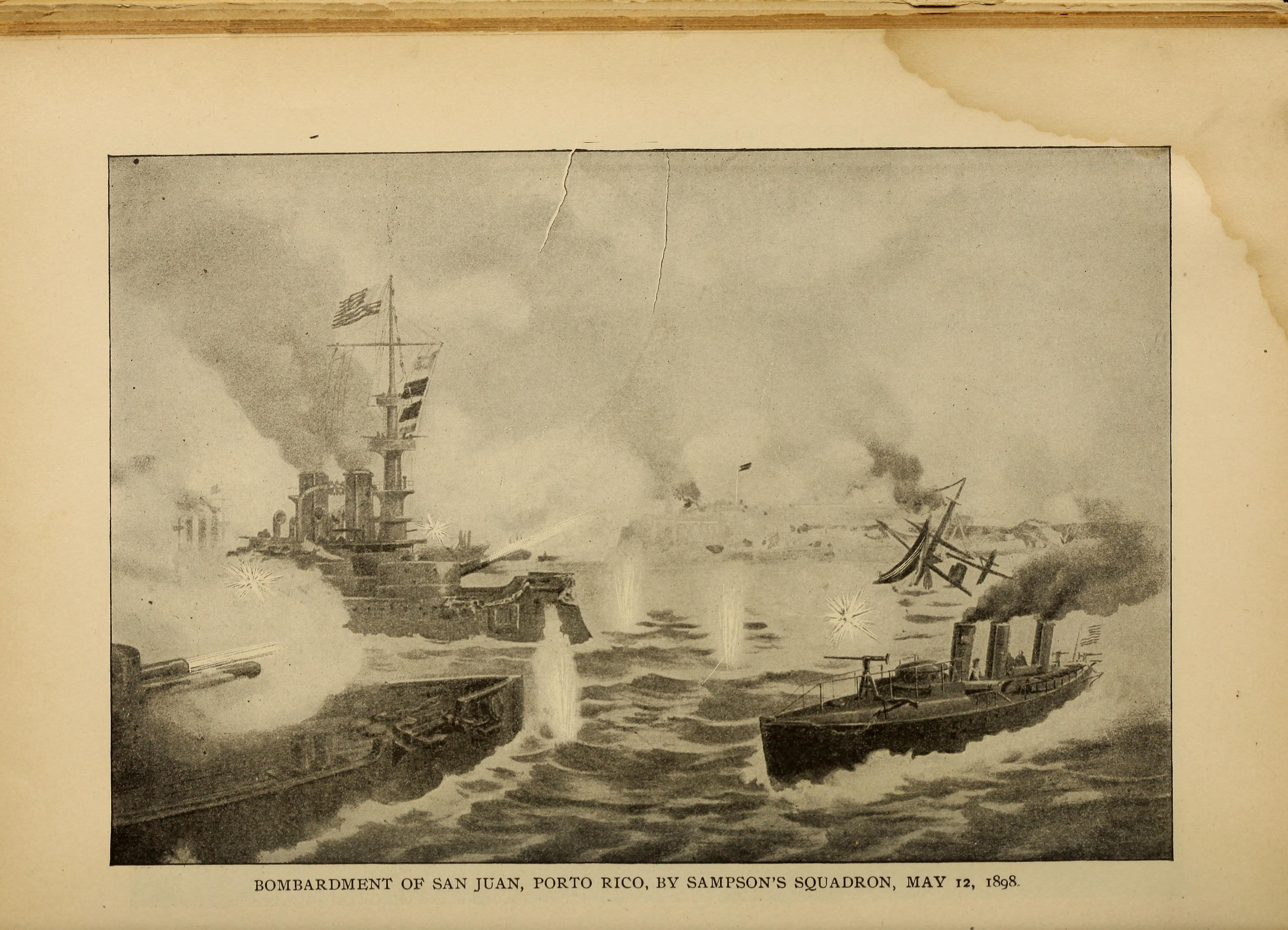
Bombardment of San Juan

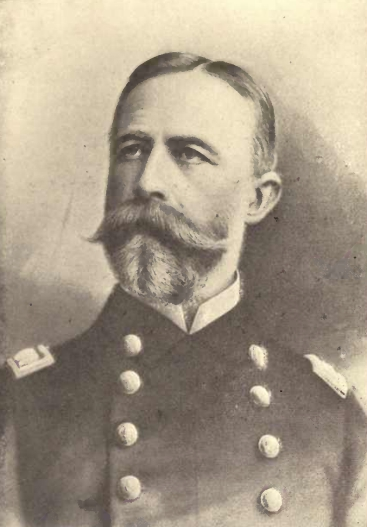
Rear Admiral William T. Sampson during the Spanish–American War

The Bombardment of San Juan, or the First Battle of San Juan (not to be confused with the Battle of San Juan Hill or the Battle for the Río San Juan de Nicaragua), refers to the first American naval attack on the fortifications of San Juan, during the Spanish–American War. The American naval commanders believed the bulk of the Spanish fleet under Admiral Pascual Cervera y Topete was steaming from the Cape Verde Islands to the Antilles, and ultimately to Puerto Rico. With this understanding, Rear Admiral William T. Sampson and a squadron of ten American warships, the battleships USS Iowa, Indiana, New York, cruisers USS Montgomery and Detroit, monitors USS Amphitrite and Terror, torpedo boat USS Porter, two unidentified auxiliary cruisers, and an unarmed collier had stood out from Havana at noon on May 2 bound for Puerto Rico. Sampson intended to intercept and destroy the Spanish squadron and then move on to attack secondary shore targets: San Juan's castles, forts and batteries. He was unaware that Topete had already eluded them and slipped his squadron into the Bay of Santiago.

On May 12, Sampson's squadron arrived at San Juan, finding an empty harbor. Making the best of the situation and as an exercise for his untested gunners, Sampson ordered the bombardment of the city's citadels. Captains Ramón Acha Caamaño and José Antonio Iriarte were among those who defended the city from Castillo San Felipe del Morro. They had three batteries under their command, which were armed with at least three 15 cm Ordóñez cannons. The battle lasted three hours and resulted in the death of Justo Esquivies, the first Puerto Rican soldier to die in the Puerto Rico campaign. Caamaño was awarded the Cruz de la Orden de Merito Militar (the Cross of the Order of the Military Merit) first class for his actions.

After causing much damage to the Spanish defenses and receiving minor damage, low on coal and ammunition, Sampson ordered a cease fire and returned to Havana, Cuba, and then on to Key West, Florida, for repairs and supplies.

=== Second Battle of San Juan ===
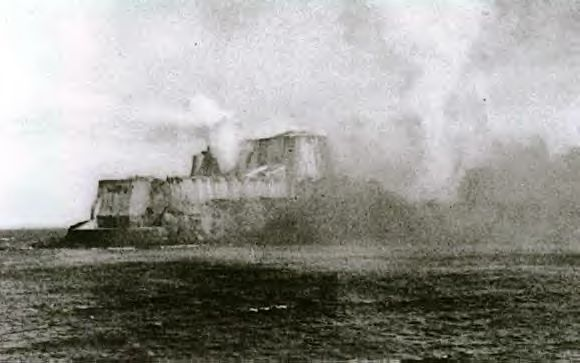
Bombardment of San Felipe del Morro

On June 22, 1898, USS Saint Paul under the command of Captain Charles Sigsbee arrived at San Juan Bay from Cuba and joined the blockade. Shortly after midday the old Spanish cruiser Isabel II set off from San Juan to engage Saint Paul with support from shore batteries. Isabel II opened fire on Saint Paul at long range without success in an attempt to break the blockade. Terror, a Spanish destroyer docked in San Juan for repairs, attempted to cover the cruiser's escape with a torpedo attack but was thwarted when her rudder was damaged by a direct hit from Saint Paul. Losing steerage, Terror inadvertently turned broadside, allowing Saint Paul to score direct hits near Terror's waterline, disabling one of her engines and causing her to list. Terror abandoned the attack and returned to port, followed by Isabel II. On June 26, USS Saint Paul was relieved by USS Yosemite, which continued the blockade of San Juan Bay.

=== Third Battle of San Juan ===
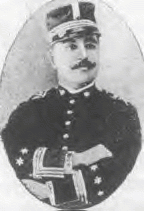
Captain Angel Rivero Mendez

On June 28, 1898, the American auxiliary cruiser USS Yosemite fought with a squadron of Spanish warships. This squadron consisted of one cruiser, two gunboats, and one blockade runner. During the engagement, SS Antonio López, a transoceanic steamer belonging to the Compañía Transatlántica Española carrying a cargo of needed military supplies, was pursued by Yosemite until the Spanish freighter ran aground at Ensenada Honda, Puerto Rico, with her valuable cargo. Captain Caamaño was in charge of retrieving the ship's cargo and the men under his command quickly removed as much of it as possible. The desperate efforts proved fruitful, and nearly the entire cargo was salvaged from the hulk with only minor articles and a cannon that had fallen overboard during salvage attempts being lost.

On 15 July, the cruiser USS New Orleans arrived to relieve Yosemite, and then quickly finished off Antonio Lopez the next day by firing twenty incendiary shells into the vessel and sinking her off the coast of Dorado. Though Antonio Lopez had been sunk, her cargo was successfully delivered and ensured that any American assault on San Juan would be met with stronger resistance. Caamaño was awarded the Cruz de la Orden de Merito Naval by the Spanish government.

The residents of San Juan were furious with Captain Rivero-Méndez and blamed him for the destruction wreaked on their city by American bombardments. Nothing came of those recriminations and Captain Rivero-Méndez was ordered to turn over the keys of all the military installations in San Juan to Captain Henry A. Reed of the U.S. Army after the Treaty of Paris of 1898 was signed.

== Land campaign in Puerto Rico (July 25 – August 13) ==
=== Landing in Guánica ===
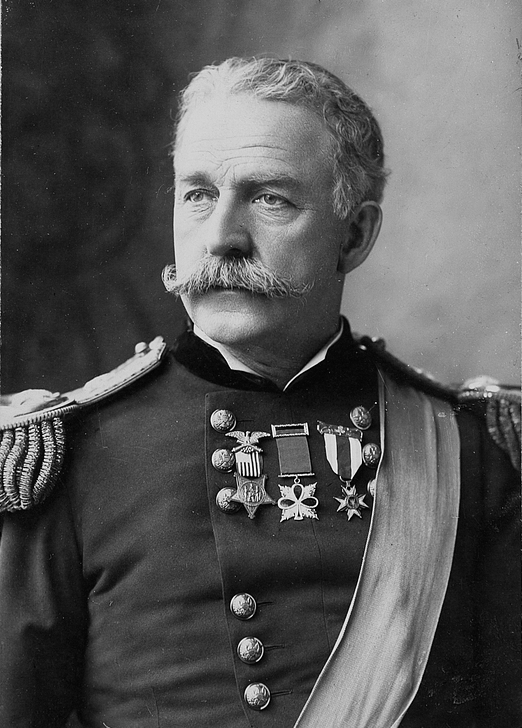
Lieutenant General Nelson A. Miles

The Spanish forces expected the Americans to attack the northern region of the island and concentrated their defenses around San Juan and Arecibo. The Spanish government was also aware of a planned landing by the Americans at Fajardo, located on the east coast and had that town fortified. However, the southern and western regions of Puerto Rico were left with little or no defenses at all.

After Cuba was taken, President William McKinley approved the land invasion of Puerto Rico by way of Fajardo, taking into consideration that the Spaniards had fortified San Juan, where they expected the initial attack. A convoy of ships left Tampa, Florida, and on July 21 another convoy, which included USS Yale, USS Massachusetts, USS Gloucester and USS Dixie, departed from Guantánamo for a four-day journey to Puerto Rico.

Major General Miles traveled aboard USS Yale. While approaching the Mona Passage that separates Puerto Rico from the island of Hispaniola to the east, Miles opted to land his troops in the southern region of the island, choosing Guánica as his landing zone. Miles dispatched patrol boats to notify all other convoys of his decision and to order them to proceed to Guánica. Miles' decision to change the invasion site was based on his belief that the town of Fajardo would be fortified and he feared that Spanish coastal gun boats would disrupt a landing there.

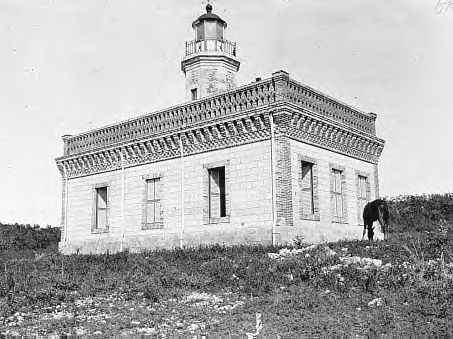
Guánica Lighthouse c.1893

On July 25, General Miles, 1,300 infantry soldiers of the 3,300 total that were assigned for the initial invasion and a convoy of ships, under the command of naval captain Francis J. Higginson of USS Massachusetts arrived at Guánica Bay. The following Navy ships and Army troopships were part of the convoy: USS Yale with Generals Miles and George A. Garretson embarked, USS Windom carrying General Guy V. Henry, USS Columbia, USS Gloucester, USS Dixie, USS Wasp and the U.S. Army transports Lampasas, Unionist, Stillwater and Specialist. Two captured Spanish ships, Nueces and Rita that had been confiscated by USS Yale as war prizes were also used.

In 1898, Guánica was a small barrio within the jurisdiction of the municipality of Yauco. It had 60 houses in all and its only defense was eleven members of the 4th Volante de Yauco, a Puerto Rican militia unit, under the command of Lieutenant Enrique Méndez López. When the Guánica Lighthouse keeper Robustiano Rivera spotted the approaching convoy, he immediately gave the alert to the residents of the barrio. All of the residents, with the exception Agustín Barrenechea, Vicente Ferrer, Juan María Morciglio, Simón Mejil, Salvador Muñoz, Cornelio Serrano and Pascual Elena, who welcomed the invaders, abandoned their homes and joined Rivera on his journey to Yauco where he broke the news of the invading forces to the city's mayor.

=== First skirmish ===
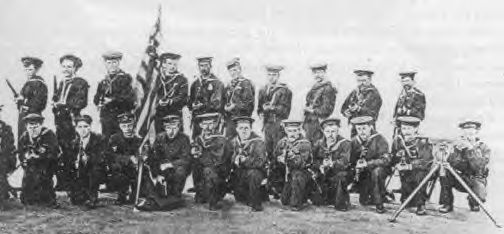
Gloucester landing team

Gloucester was the first ship to set anchor in the Bay of Guánica. Twenty-eight sailors and marines, under the command of lieutenants H. P. Huse and Wood, departed from the ship on rafts and landed on the beach. The marines lowered the Spanish flag from a beach flagpole and replaced it with the American flag. They then proceeded to set up a machine gun nest and placed barbed wire around their perimeter. The first land skirmish in Puerto Rico between the Puerto Rican militia and the American forces occurred when Lieutenant Méndez López and his men attacked and opened fire on the Americans. During the small battle which followed, the Americans returned fire with their machine gun and Gloucester began to bombard the Spanish position. Lieutenant Méndez López and three of his men were wounded and the militia unit was forced to retreat to the town of Yauco.

=== Invasion ===
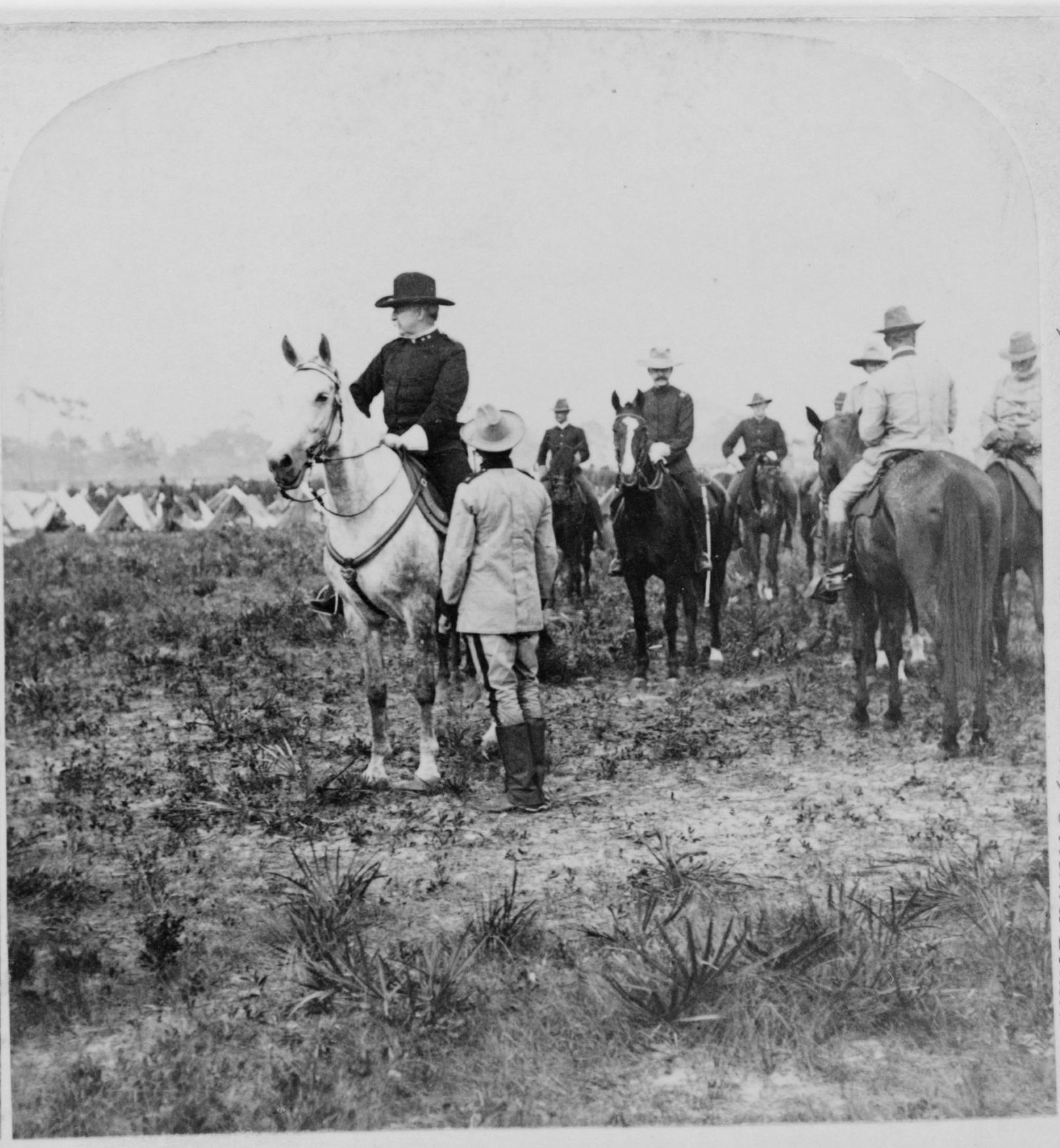
General Nelson Miles and other soldiers on horseback in Puerto Rico

After the skirmish was over, men from Lampasas landed on the beach to secure the area and to build a landing dock. Three thousand and three-hundred American soldiers under the command of General Miles landed. The units that landed were the 6th Volunteer Regiments of Illinois and Massachusetts, an artillery battalion, five battery companies, two engineer companies and a medical unit. The men who had not abandoned the settlement of Guánica swore allegiance to the United States. Garretson named Agustín Barrenechea as Mayor of Guánica and Simón Mejil the chief of police. On the afternoon of the 25th, Garretson left Guánica with seven companies of the 6th Massachusetts and one company of the 6th Illinois and headed towards Yauco.

Secretary of War Russell A. Alger learned about the landing at Guánica the next day when he read an Associated Press report in a local Washington, D.C., newspaper. The War Department had ordered Miles to invade Puerto Rico by way of San Juan and therefore Alger was completely surprised with the report. Miles would have been subject to disciplinary actions had the invasion not gone so smoothly. Alger received the following cable from Miles three days after the invasion: "Spanish troops are retreating from southern part of Puerto Rico. This is a prosperous and beautiful country. The Army will soon be in mountain region. Weather delightful; troops in the best of health and spirit. Anticipate no insurmountable obstacles in future results. Results thus far have been accomplished without loss of a single life.

=== Battle of Yauco ===
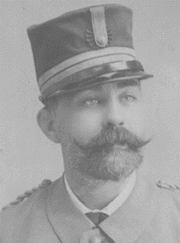
Lt. Col. Francisco Puig

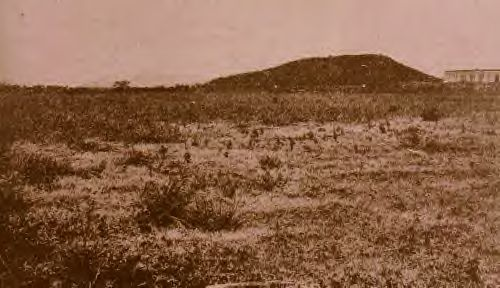
Part of the Hacienda Desideria, owned by Antonio Mariani, where the Battle of Yauco took place in 1898

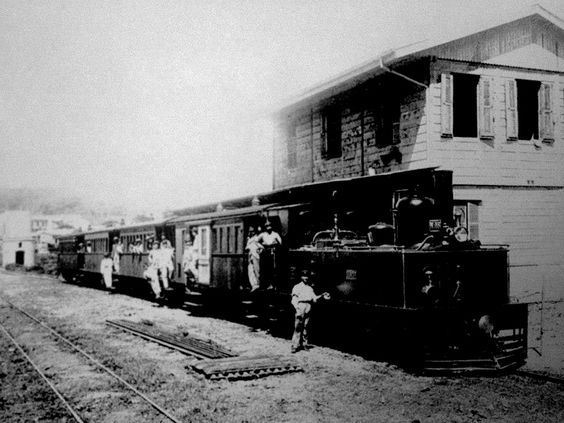
19th century train station in Yauco

After Rivera, the keeper of the Guánica Lighthouse notified Atilio Gaztambide, the mayor of Yauco, located six miles (9.7 km) northeast of Guánica, of the imminent and incoming American invasion, the mayor in turn notified Governor Macías via telegraph. The governor ordered Captain Salvador Meca and his 3rd Company of the 25th Patria Battalion from Yauco to head for Guánica. Meca and his men were joined by Lieutenant Colonel Francisco Puig, who assumed command of the Spanish forces at Hacienda Desideria two miles (3.2 km) from Guánica. Puig arrived with two companies known as "Cazador Patria Battalion", and they were joined by Puerto Rican volunteers, the civil guards and mounted guerrillas from the towns of Yauco and Sabana Grande. Puig had the men positioned on both sides of the road that ran from Guánica to the coffee Hacienda Desideria (owned by Antonio Mariani) in Yauco, as well as an infantry company positioned on a hill south of the hacienda.

In the meantime, Garretson set out of Guánica with his men towards Yauco with the intention of capturing the Yauco rail terminus that ran between that town and the city of Ponce, the largest in the southern region of the island. Garretson and his men arrived in the darkness of night and were informed by his scouts of the possibility of a hostile situation at the Hacienda Desideria. He ordered the Illinois company and two companies (companies L and M) of the 6th Massachusetts to occupy a small hill on his right that overlooked the hacienda.

Captain San Pedro detected the movements of the American troops from his positions on a nearby hill and ordered his men to open fire. Garretson then ordered a direct attack on the Spanish and Puerto Rican forces in the hacienda. At day break, the 6th Massachusetts overran the Spanish forces and suffered four casualties. Puig was expecting reinforcements from Yauco which did not arrive and was ordered to disengage and retreat. Before retreating the right wing of the Spanish force, which was not overrun, initiated a flanking attack against two positions held by the Illinois and Massachusetts companies. The unexpected strength of the Spanish force caused some of the 6th Massachusetts troops to momentarily panic, but the Spanish forces were eventually driven off. Puig and his forces suffered two officers and three soldiers wounded and two soldiers dead.

Puig and his men retreated towards Yauco, but failed to destroy the rail terminus which connected the town to the city of Ponce, and proceeded to march towards the town of Peñuelas. Garretson's troops entered Yauco on the afternoon of July 26 and on July 27 Puig's men continued their march, leaving their artillery and heavy equipment behind, passing the towns of Adjuntas and Utuado and finally arriving at the city of Arecibo on the northern coast of the island on July 29. Colonel Puig, believing that he would be dishonored and accused by the Spanish government of abandoning military equipment during his retreat, committed suicide on August 2.

Miles, upon learning about the lack of discipline of the 6th Massachusetts during the battle, ordered an investigation. The 6th Massachusetts was sent on a hard march from Guánica to Ponce as punishment and the regimental commander, a lieutenant colonel, a major, and a captain resigned upon request.

=== Battle of Fajardo ===
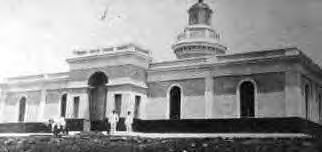
Faro de Las Cabezas de San Juan (Cape San Juan lighthouse), c. 1898

On August 1, the monitors USS Puritan, USS Amphitrite, armed tug USS Leyden, and collier USS Hannibal were sailing off the coast of Fajardo on the northeast corner of Puerto Rico, when Captain Frederick W. Rodgers, Puritan's commanding officer and senior officer afloat, spotted the Faro de Las Cabezas de San Juan (Cape San Juan Lighthouse) that had been designated the landing site for the US Army's invasion of Puerto Rico. Rodgers ordered a reconnaissance landing party ashore, including Puerto Rican volunteers. The sailors advanced to within a one-half mile (0.80 km) of Fajardo, about five miles (8.0 km) from the coast, but withdrew when they encountered Spanish troops.

The 25-man Spanish garrison stationed in Fajardo was alerted to the American presence and ordered to withdraw after notifying their superiors in San Juan. When Santiago Veve Calzada, a Fajardo native, realized that the garrison was abandoned and his town defenseless against the Americans, he implored the Spanish authorities in San Juan to dispatch troops to defend Fajardo. Losing hope that Spanish troops would come to the town's aid, Veve went to the lighthouse to seek protection for the town from the Americans. On the afternoon of August 5, Veve entered Fajardo with a contingent of bluejackets and United States flags were hoisted over the Fajardo Customs House at the harbor and in the city hall. On the evening of August 6, Captain Charles J. Barclay of Amphitrite ordered 28 sailors and 7 officers commanded by Lieutenant Charles N. Atwater and Assistant Engineer David J. Jenkins ashore to relight and occupy the Fajardo lighthouse. They were also ordered to quarter 60 women and children of the town's families that were deemed in danger for having sided with the Americans. As the first group of sailors was entering the darkened lighthouse, naval cadet William H. Boardman was mortally wounded when his revolver fell from a faulty holster and discharged into his thigh, cutting the femoral artery. His was one of only two Navy deaths during the Puerto Rico campaign.

On August 4, Governor General Manuel Macías y Casado sent Colonel Pedro del Pino and about 220 troops, including civil guardsmen to recapture the city. When Colonel Pino entered Fajardo on August 7, he found it nearly deserted because the residents, fearing a battle, had fled to the Fajardo light and the surrounding hills. At close to midnight on August 8, Pino's troops began their assault on the lighthouse. The landing party of Amphitrite's sailors occupying the lighthouse doused the light and signaled the ships offshore, initiating shore bombardment as the naval guns began firing a protective pattern. After two hours, the Spanish forces retreated to the town. The Americans suffered no casualties, despite a close call when a wayward naval shell smashed through the two-foot (0.61 m) thick walls of the lighthouse within touch of six men but failed to explode. The Spanish losses were two dead and three wounded, including a lieutenant.

Early the next morning, Barclay decided the continued occupation of the lighthouse was of marginal value and ordered his men back to the ship. A landing party of 30 sailors from Amphitrite and a similar number of U.S. Marines from USS Cincinnati under Lieutenant John A. Lejeune came ashore to secure the area while the 60 Fajardo civilians boarded Leyden for passage to Ponce and the lighthouse was abandoned to the Spaniards. In Fajardo, Pino's men tore down the U.S. flags that flew over the harbor customs house and city hall, returning to San Juan after verifying that the lighthouse was truly abandoned. The contingent of about 20 civil guards that had accompanied Pino, were left to maintain order in the town. The skirmish at Fajardo was the only time that American forces withdrew from a position during the Puerto Rico campaign.

=== Battle of Guayama ===
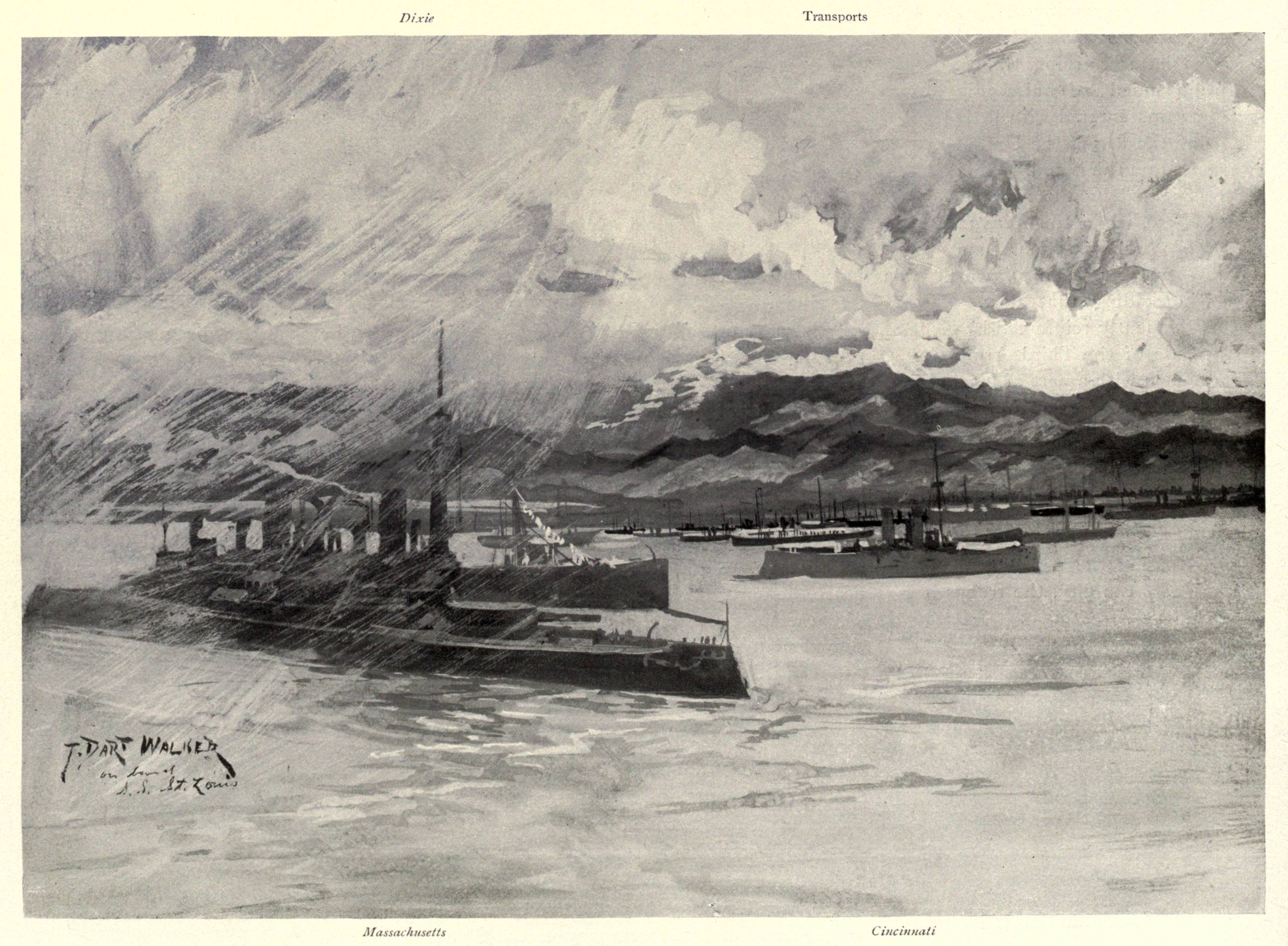
US troopships and convoy at Playa de Ponce, 1898

After the town of Yauco was taken, Miles decided to attack the City of Ponce by sea and by land. Garretson's 6th Illinois and 6th Massachusetts had returned to Guánica and after the troops rested, Garretson and his men were ordered to move eastward to Ponce. Lt. Col. Rafael Martinez Illecas, in charge of the Spanish forces in that city, had pulled out, leaving behind a small garrison of 300 volunteers to hold the town. When the American forces arrived in Ponce they met no resistance and the Spanish volunteers surrendered. The American forces were not the only ones who participated in the taking of Ponce. Members of the Puerto Rican Commission, which included the leader of the Intentona de Yauco revolt, Antonio Mattei Lluberas and his group, arrived in Ponce aboard USS St. Louis and were assigned to the headquarters of General Miles. From this group Miles organized the "Porto Rican Scouts", which was later assigned to General Theodore Schwan, under the command of Edwardo Lugo Viñas. Miles then ordered Brigadier General Peter G. Hains and the men of the 3rd Illinois, 4th Ohio and 4th Pennsylvania Volunteer Infantry Regiments to take Arroyo, a small port 60 miles (97 km) east of Ponce that served the larger nearby coastal town of Guayama. Arroyo was taken on August 2 and on August 5 Hanes ordered the 4th Ohio, the 3rd Illinois and a battery of Sims-Dudley guns, manned by Company G of the 4th Ohio, to capture Guayama.

Spanish forces were entrenched on the crest of two small hills, between which the road from Arroyo to Guayama ran. The Americans had crossed a stream in front of the hills when suddenly the Spanish opened fire. The Americans protected their position by the stream and increased their firepower as more reinforcements arrived. The outnumbered Spanish troops retreated to Guayama as the Americans made their advance on the hills. The firefight, which lasted half an hour, left three American wounded. When the 4th Ohio entered the town they discovered that the Spaniards had fled north and abandoned the city, ending the Battle of Guayama. General John Rutter Brooke used the Cautiño Residence (Casa Cautiño) by the town square in Guayama as his military headquarters.

=== Battle of the Guamaní River Bridge ===
On August 6, Colonel Alonzo B. Coit sent two companies of the 4th Ohio on a reconnaissance mission across and beyond a cast iron bridge that crossed the Guamaní River. The road beyond the bridge was essential for General Hains' projected advance to the town of Cayey. The 4th Ohio observed elements of Spain's 6th Provisional Battalion under the command of Julio Cervera Baviera entrenched in a hilly area they called Guamaní Heights, six miles north of the bridge. The 4th felt that they were too strongly entrenched to attempt an assault at the time. The 4th Ohio requested reinforcements and on August 9, attacked the Spaniards and a short firefight erupted. The numerical superiority of the Americans forced the Spanish to retreat from Guamaní Heights. This battle was the costliest battle yet for the Americans since their landing at Guánica, as it resulted in seven wounded. The Spanish forces suffered 2 dead and 15 wounded.

=== Battle of Coamo ===
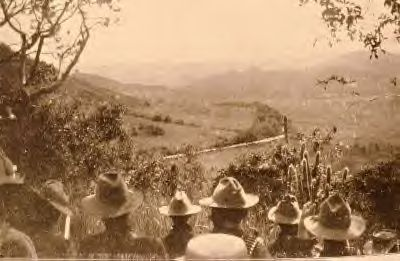
The 3rd Wisconsin awaits orders to charge the Spanish at Coamo

Shortly after the American soldiers disembarked, a group of Spanish and Puerto Rican units began moving from Ponce to Aibonito, marching through the Carretera Central route. The caravan was composed of two companies of the Cazadores de la Patria Battalion and some members of the Civil Guard and a Puerto Rican anti-Spanish guerilla force. A total of 248 infantry men and 42 members of the cavalry formed the battalions under the command of Lt. Col. Rafael Martínez Illescas, the same commander who was in charge of the Ponce garrison. Traveling by foot, the journey would last two days. The group decided to spend one night in the hot springs resort in the municipality of Coamo known as the Baños de Coamo before continuing their march in the morning. Martínez Illescas immediately ordered the construction of several trenches; while building these, the soldiers were ambushed by an anti-Spanish guerilla force, led by Pedro María Descartes, who managed to kill a member of the Civil Guard.

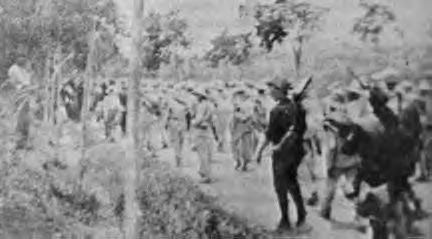
Spanish and Puerto Rican prisoners of war after the Battle of Coamo

Meanwhile, two battalions of volunteers from Wisconsin and Pennsylvania, led by Generals Oswald H. Ernst and James H. Wilson, settled on opposite sides of the road to Coamo. On August 9, 1898, the Americans began their offensive, opening cannon fire against the city and completing their attack with artillery fire, the 3rd and 4th Regular Pennsylvania Artillery to provide artillery support for the frontal assault on the Baños, damaging the resort. The Americans intended to encircle and defeat the defenses in the city. A group of soldiers entered the city from the backside, having advanced through a river nearby. The rear assault was reinforced by Wilson's army under General Ernst, attempting to trap the allied soldiers in a crossfire, employing a tactic known as the pincer movement. Martínez Illescas was surprised by the attack and led an improvised attack, but he was killed in the crossfire along with his second-in-command, leaving Captain Hita in charge; he ordered his men to surrender. Half of the allied troops ignored the order and continued the attack, Troop C galloped at top speed north from the Baños de Coamo, after finding the resort abandoned by the Spanish. Hita's men were sent to a prisoner-of-war camp located at Descalabrado River, while the men who continued to attack retreated to Aibonito when they realized that the Americans were using a pincer movement.

=== Battle of Silva Heights ===
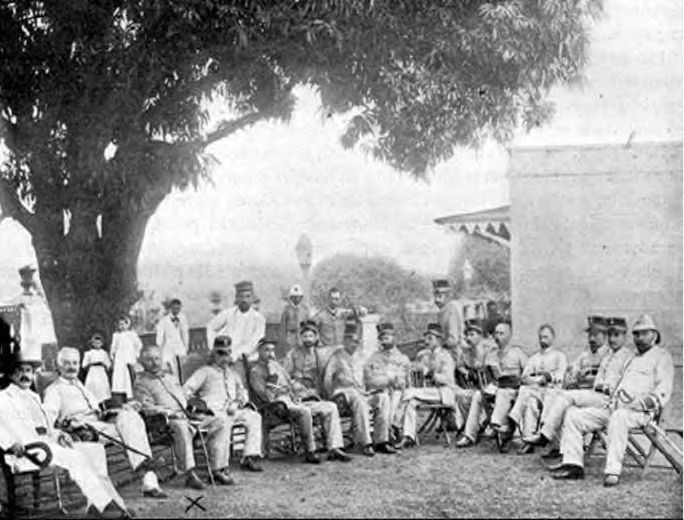
Col. Julio Soto Villanueva (X) with his staff in Mayagüez

Brigadier General Theodore Schwan and 2,896 men of his Independent Brigade had landed in Guánica and marched towards occupied Yauco. Schwan and his men were ordered to move westward and to capture the city of Mayagüez. Colonel Julio Soto Villanueva ordered 1,500 Spanish Regulars of the 24th Rifle Battalion, six companies of the Alfonso XIII auxiliaries, and other scattered Spanish and Puerto Rican guerilla forces dispatched from the garrison at Mayagüez to meet and defeat Schwan. The Spanish forces entrenched themselves at a high ridge they named Silva Heights, located at a road near the town of Hormigueros.

Schwan's troops arrived in the city of San Germán and continued the march towards their objective. Troop A of Schwan's 5th Cavalry approached Silva Heights and were soon engaged in a firefight when the Spanish forces opened fire. The Americans were aided by two companies of the 19th Infantry, supported by artillery and Gatling guns, as well as the 11th Infantry. The Spanish forces retreated after the American reinforcements brought them under intense fire. Schwan's men set up camp on Silva Heights for the night and the following day they continued their drive to Mayagüez. They arrived the following morning to find that the Spanish forces had abandoned the city to retreat to the east towards Lares. Schwan decided to send forces in order to follow and capture Soto Villanueva and his forces, as he was additionally ordered to take the town of Las Marías which was in the way of the retreating army's path. The outcome of the Silva Heights Battle left 3 Spanish dead, 6 wounded, and 136 prisoners. Schwan's brigade suffered 15 wounded and 2 killed in action.

=== Battle of Asomante ===
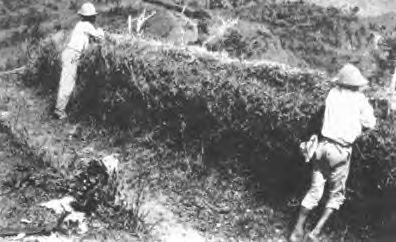
Spanish trenches in Asomante

The American cavalry pursued the soldiers that had retreated from Coamo, but were not able to reach them until the units had entered Aibonito Pass, a mountain pass more commonly known as Asomante. The region had been prepared by allied Puerto Rican and Spanish troops, who had built a trench and placed soldiers and equipment around the foliage. As soon as the soldiers noticed the presence of the invading unit they opened cannon fire. The cavalry received infantry reinforcements, which were received by battery fire. Six American soldiers were injured in the crossfire, prompting a retreat order. The allied units (Spanish and Puerto Rican) lost five soldiers and two civil guards. During the following two days the Americans decided to do a battlefield reconnaissance and Colonel Samuel Reber II, developed a croquis of the Aibonito Pass. Spies were deployed throughout Coamo, including a Puerto Rican separatist named Carlos Patterne, who was able to enter the city without suspicion and contact Rufino Huertas, a separatist teacher. Huertas gave Patterne a series of defense plans that were previously developed and organized by Martínez Illescas. While inactive, the Puerto Rican soldiers deployed in Asomante completed rounds every two hours, working four hours daily. They mostly ate beans, some rice and meat, while conserving several cracker packs for Spanish reinforcements that were supposed to arrive. They slept in improvised huts that did not protect them from the rain.

The American commanders decided to attack the trenches with artillery, while sending a large group to Barranquitas, from which they would try to attack the allied troops from the back. At 10:30 a.m. Captain Ramsay D. Potts led part of the 3rd Wisconsin Volunteer Infantry Regiment through the central highway to Aibonito. Lieutenants Bliss and O'Hern led two units with similar equipment. At 1:00 p.m. the allied troops opened cannon fire as the Americans entered their range. Potts ordered the deployment of two batteries while O'Hern received orders from Commander Landcaster to set a cannon at a distance of a 100 yards to the vanguard's right. They intended to defeat a small group led by Captain Hernaíz. Shrapnel from allied cannon fire was falling close to Lancaster's location, and he asked Potts to help him by deploying a battery nearby. One of Hernaíz's Placensias cannons overheated, which forced him to order a temporary cease to the offensive. Landcaster believed that the opposition had been annihilated, ordered an advance. However, the allied fire was renewed, this time supported by Mauser rifle fire. The sudden attack caused confusion among some soldiers, who reported seeing a second Spanish unit nearby. Fearing that the allied units could capture the American equipment, Landcaster ordered a retreat. Lieutenant Hains was gravely injured by a Mauser bullet, being replaced by Sergeant John Long. Meanwhile, most of Potts' men fled the battlefield. In the crossfire the allied forces overpowered the American infantry, using Mauser fire to disorganize their artillery, during which time four American officials were gravely injured including Long, Lieutenant Harris, Captain E.T. Lee and Corporal Oscar Swanson. Private Frederick Yough, Corporal August Yank, George J. Bruce and Private Sices also received injuries, with Yough subsequently dying. Harris' position was filled by O'Hern, while Swanson was fatally shot while trying to support the artillery. In total the allied units had only an injured artillery man, while the American side had two dead and five injured. Wilson's camp was the first to receive a telegram from General Miles notifying him that the war had ended. The Americans sent Bliss to Asomante, but Nouvilas refused to suspend the hostilities after receiving a telegram from Macías denying any peace treaty. All military actions in Puerto Rico were supposed to be suspended on August 13, after President William McKinley and French Ambassador Jules Cambon, acting on behalf of the Spanish government, signed an armistice whereby Spain relinquished its sovereignty over the territory of Puerto Rico. However a final engagement took place on the same day.

=== The Battle of Las Marias (Guacio Disaster) ===
The retreating Mayagüez army marched for the next two days after leaving the city. At 10:30 am on August 11, Soto Villanueva was injured in the leg after falling through a bridge he was trying to cross. He became convinced his leg had been broken and needed to be carried by four men in a hammock for the remainder of the march. The marching army reached Las Marias on the same day. Soto Villanueva then ordered a private meeting at the house of the town mayor between himself, Lieutenant Colonel Antonio Oses, Lieutenant Colonel Salvador Suau and Lieutenant Rodolfo Olea Mora in which it is decided to make a final stand in the town against the incoming enemy forces. Soto sent a telegram to General Macias informing him of the choice, but as a response received orders to continue the march towards Lares. Feeling incapable of leading the march, Soto once again set up a meeting between himself and the aforementioned officers. During the meeting, Soto ordered the army to leave him and relinquished his command to Lieutenant Colonel Oses. As his first order as commanding officer, Oses followed the Governor's command. However, when attempting to leave las Marias the army was halted at 11:00 pm on August 12 by the roaring Guacio River which had grown massive enough as to prevent passage through it. Oses ordered the army to wait until morning to see if the current died down. On August 13 the river currents remained at the same level. In the morning Colonel Suau remembered a crossing at the north of the river and at 9:00 am ordered troops under his command to march north in order to pass through it. At this point the American troops were spotted, beginning the battle. Oses saw victory as unlikely and ordered Lieutenant Olea to launch a barrage of cannon fire at the American troops as his forces attempted to cross the river by force. In the ensuing melee Oses and the majority of the Spanish forces were captured, taken prisoner and forced to march back to Mayagüez. The forces under Colonel Suau found the crossing and retreated from the battle, later successfully arriving in Lares where they learned of the surrender. Schwan, upon receiving news of the prisoners wished to continue the pursuit of the remaining forces, but was halted by news of the surrender. The battle at Las Marías was perceived to have been a colossal military failure by the Spanish and local population, who named it the Guacio Disaster.

== Aftermath ==
=== Treaty of Paris of 1898 ===
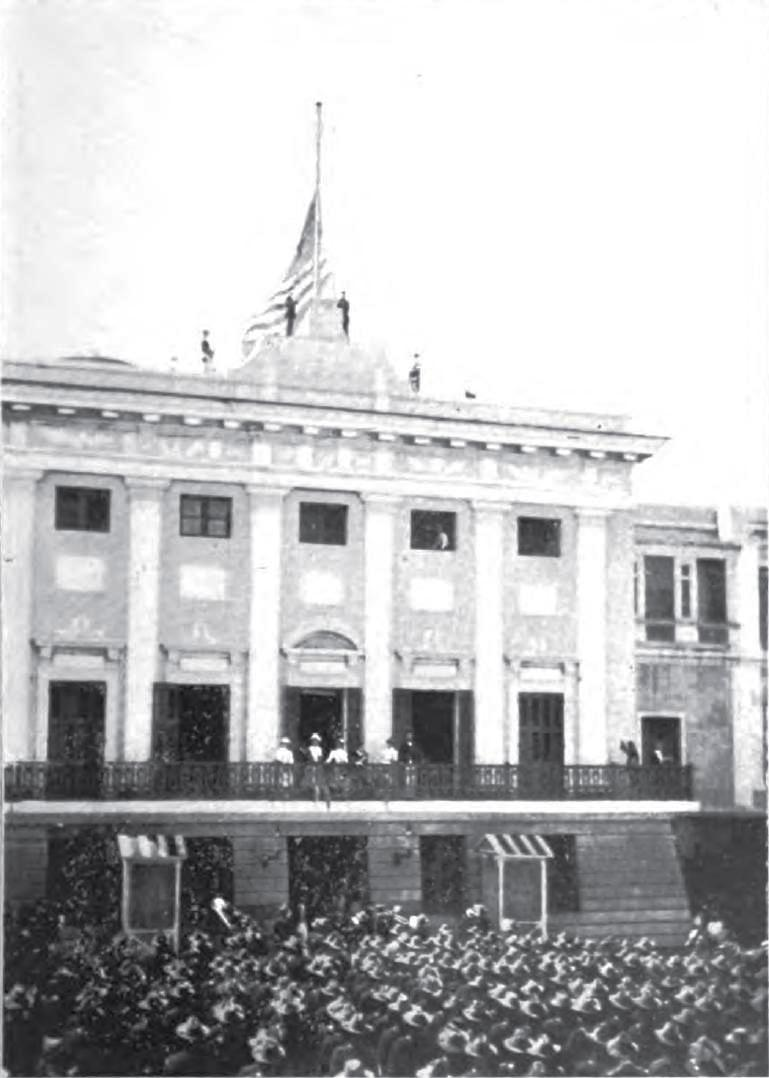
Raising the U.S. flag in La Fortaleza, San Juan, October 18, 1898

The Puerto Rico campaign, which began with Yales's capture of Rita on May 8, and ended on December 10, after the Treaty of Paris was signed, was short compared to the other campaigns in the Spanish–American War, because an armistice stopped the hostilities between Spain and the United States on August 12. As a result, the campaign came to an end before its military objective in Puerto Rico was completed, which was to reach and take the capital city of San Juan. Among the factors which benefited the invaders in the short campaign was that the Puerto Ricans who resided in the southern and western towns and villages resented Spanish rule and tended to view the Americans as their liberators. The Treaty of Paris came into effect on April 11, 1899, when the documents of ratification were exchanged. Some Puerto Rican leaders such as José de Diego and Eugenio María de Hostos expected the United States to grant the island its independence and in the case of Rosendo Matienzo Cintrón and the committee which he headed, greeted General Miles and the invaders in Ponce with banquets. Believing that Puerto Rico would gain its independence, a group of men staged an uprising in Ciales on August 13, 1898, which became known as El Levantamiento de Ciales or the "Ciales Uprising" and proclaimed Puerto Rico a republic. The Spanish authorities who were unaware that the cease fire had been signed brutally suppressed the uprising. Another reason which can explain why the campaign was short and not as violent as the others is that the 1st, 2nd and 3rd Puerto Rican provisional battalions were in Cuba defending that island against the American invaders.

The Puerto Rican Battalion suffered a total of 70 casualties which included their dead, wounded, MIAs and prisoners. The Spanish, Puerto Ricans and Americans that participated in the campaign totaled 33,472. Of this total 8,000 were Spanish, 10,000 were Puerto Rican and 15,472 were American military personnel. The Spanish and Puerto Ricans suffered 429 casualties which included 17 dead, 88 wounded and 324 captured. The American forces suffered 43 casualties: 3 dead and 40 wounded. The commander of Spain's 6th Provisional Battalion, Julio Cervera Baviera, gained notoriety as the author of a pamphlet called La defensa de Puerto Rico, which supported Governor General Manuel Macías y Casado and in an attempt to justify Spain's defeat against the United States, blamed the Puerto Rican volunteers in the Spanish Army as the reason behind the fiasco. A group of angry San Juan locals agreed to challenge Cervera to a duel if the commander did not retract his pamphlet. The men drew lots for this honor; it fell to José Janer y Soler and was seconded by Cayetano Coll y Toste y Leonidas Villalón. Cervera's seconds were Colonel Pedro del Pino and Captain Emilio Barrera. The duel never took place, as Cervera explained his intentions in writing the pamphlet, and all parties were satisfied.

Under the terms of the Treaty of Paris of 1898, ratified on April 11, 1899, Puerto Rico was ceded to the United States. Spain had lost its last colony in the Western Hemisphere and the United States gained imperial strength and global presence. The United States established a military government and appointed Miles the first head of the military government established on the island, acting as both head of the army of occupation and administrator of civil affairs. Members of the Spanish forces and civilians who were loyal to the Spanish Crown were allowed to return to Spain. By October 18, the Spanish withdrawal from Puerto Rico was completed as the final troops left San Juan for Spain. Those who belonged to the Spanish military and who decided to stay in Puerto Rico were offered the option by the United States to serve in the newly formed "Porto Rico Regiment". Some took the offer, such as Teófilo Marxuach, a former lieutenant in the Spanish Army, and others, such as Captain Angel Rivero Méndez, declined the offer and retired from the military.

=== "Americanization" of Puerto Rico ===
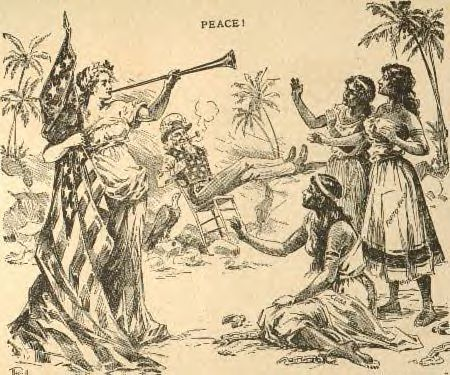
In an 1898 newspaper cartoon, "Uncle Sam" watches as the "Goddess of Liberty" heralds "freedom" for Cuba, Puerto Rico and the Philippines

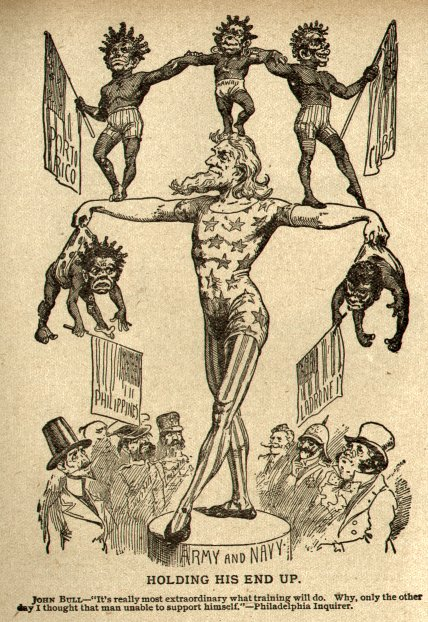
An 1899 cartoon in American newspaper The Philadelphia Inquirer depicting the people of Puerto Rico, as well as those of the new possessions of the United States, as black savage children

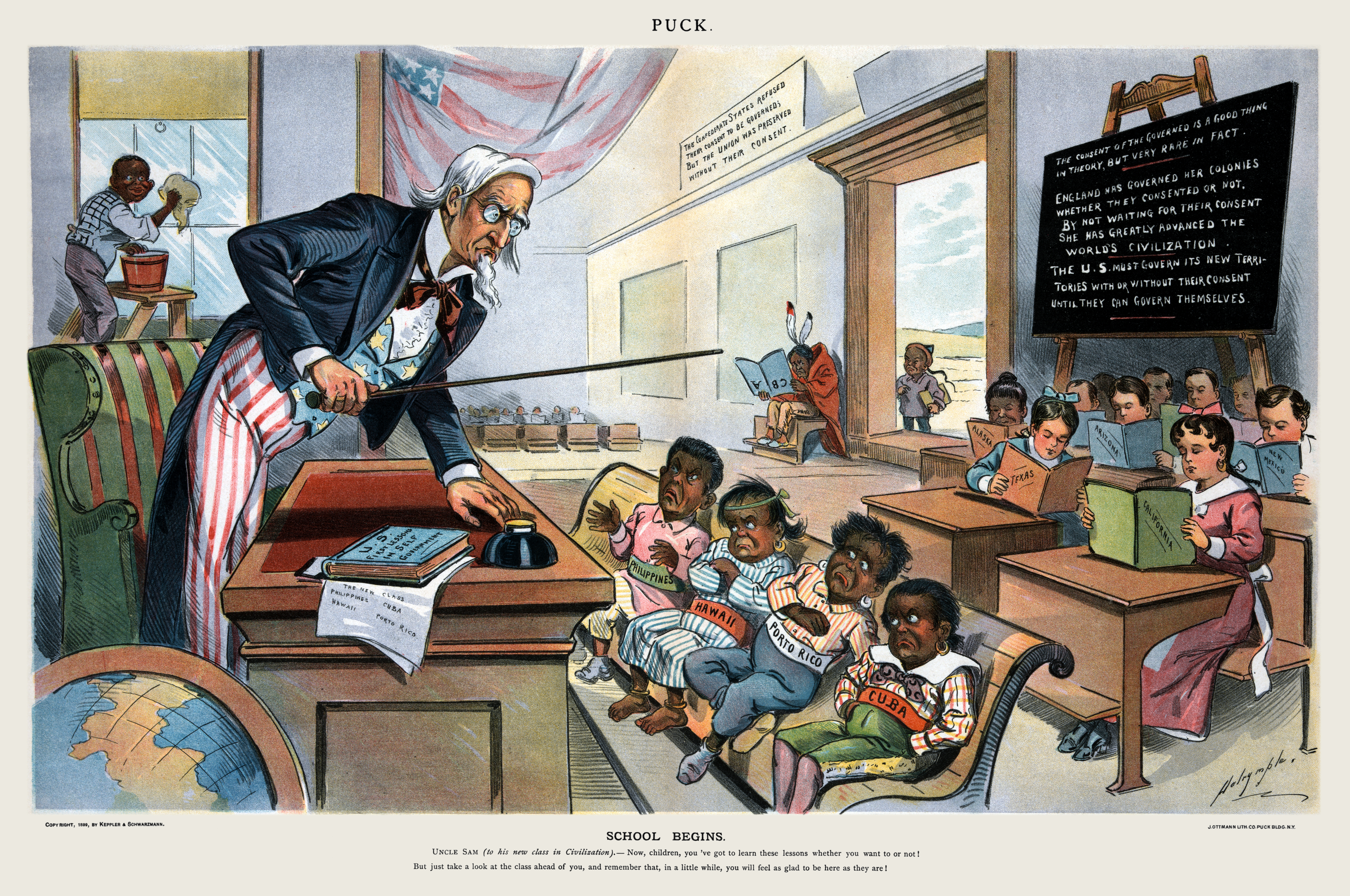
An 1899, caricature by Louis Dalrymple (1866–1905), showing Uncle Sam harshly lecturing four black children labelled Philippines, Hawaii, Puerto Rico and Cuba

From 1898 to 1900, Puerto Rico was governed by four military officers, commanding general Miles, Major General John R. Brooke (1898–1898), Major General Guy Vernon Henry (1898–1899) and Major General George Whitefield Davis (1899–1900). Miles, Brooke and Henry were experienced veterans of the Indian Wars and, even though they were accustomed to the pacification and administration of the Native Americans, the U.S. Army had no previous experience in the administration of overseas territories. Henry stated: "It was an entirely new duty for American Army officers. There was no precedent in the experience of these so suddenly placed in charge of this our first real colony, upon which their policy could be based."

The administration of Puerto Rico was the responsibility of the United States Department of War's Division of Insular Affairs which was modeled after the Bureau of Indian Affairs. Almost immediately, the United States began the "Americanization" process of Puerto Rico. The U.S. occupation brought about a total change in Puerto Rico's economy and polity and did not apply democratic principles to the colony. Puerto Rico was classified as an "unincorporated territory" which meant that the protections of the United States Constitution did not automatically apply because the island belonged to the U.S., but was not part of the U.S.

In 1899, U.S. Senator George Frisbie Hoar described Puerto Ricans as "uneducated, simple-minded and harmless people who were only interested in wine, women, music and dancing" and recommended that Spanish should be abolished in the island's schools and only English should be taught. Schools became the primary vehicle of Americanization, and initially all classes were taught in English, which also made for a large dropout rate.

On January 15, 1899, the military government changed the name of Puerto Rico to Porto Rico (On May 17, 1932, U.S. Congress changed the name back to "Puerto Rico") and the island's currency was changed from the Puerto Rican peso to the American dollar, integrating the island's currency into the U.S. monetary system. The United States exerted its control over the economy of the island by prohibiting Puerto Rico from negotiating commercial treaties with other nations, from determining tariffs, and from shipping goods to the mainland on other than U.S. carriers.

=== Civil disorder ===
A state of civil disorder existed in the island's mountainous region after the invasion of the United States. The local Criollo, who now found themselves unemployed and felt that they had been exploited by their former employers, formed bands called Partidas. The Partidas at first attacked and robbed many of the wealthy plantation owners, who were loyal to the Spanish Crown, in vengeance, however they later began to attack the businesses owned by the locals. One of the most notable leaders of the Partidas was José Maldonado Román a.k.a. Aguila Blanca. Maldonado, who operated in the areas of Juana Díaz and Ponce, harassed the Spanish Civil Guard and later did the same to the American forces. Another factor contributing to the state of civil disorder on the island was the lack of discipline of the American troops who were stationed there. These troops were not professional soldiers and were composed of volunteers. Many instances were reported where these men would act disorderly, under the influence of alcohol, and get into fights with the local residents. The state of civil disorder came to a halt on the island after the military government began to rebuild Puerto Rico's infrastructure, thereby providing employment for many of the discontented and unemployed population, and when the volunteer troops were replaced by the regular army.

=== End of military rule and rise of the sugar economy ===
Military rule was replaced by a civilian government by way of the Foraker Act of 1900. However, the act stipulated that the governor, chief of police and top officials were presidentially appointed and they were all to be Americans.

In 1901, the first civilian U.S. governor of Puerto Rico, Charles H. Allen, installed himself as president of the largest sugar-refining company in the world, the American Sugar Refining Company. This company was later renamed the Domino Sugar company. In effect, Allen leveraged his governorship of Puerto Rico into a controlling interest over the entire Puerto Rican economy.

=== 54 years after the end of the Puerto Rico campaign ===
In 1947, the U.S. granted Puerto Ricans the right to democratically elect their own governor, which they first exercised in 1948. The Constitution of Puerto Rico was approved by a Constitutional Convention on February 6, 1952, ratified by the U.S. Congress, and approved by President Harry S. Truman on July 3 of that year. Puerto Rico adopted the name of Estado Libre Asociado de Puerto Rico (which translates as "Free Associated State of Puerto Rico"), today officially translated into English as Commonwealth of Puerto Rico, for its body politic.

== Markers, monuments and tombstones ==
In Puerto Rico there are no officially-established or built monuments to commemorate the Spanish–American War. There are however various markers where some of the historical events took place and some tombstones which honor both the American invaders and the joint Spanish and Puerto Rican defenders of the island. The National Register of Historic Places also lists various structures and sites in direct reference to the Spanish–American War such as the S.S. Antonio Lopez Shipwreck site in Dorado, the Guánica and Fajardo lighthouses, the Silva Bridge in Hormigueros, and the Yauco Battle Site (and Hacienda Desideria, today known as Hacienda Santa Rita) in Guánica. Some of these sites were also listed as part of a multiple property submission under the title "Spanish American War in Puerto Rico" in 1992.

=== La Piedra de Guánica and other landmarks ===
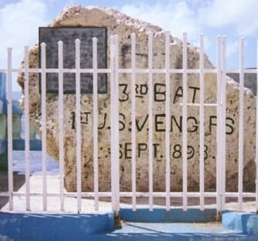
Rock in Guánica marking where Major General Nelson A. Miles and his men landed

The municipality of Guánica is home to a landmark rock that contains an inscription indicating the place where Major General Nelson A. Miles and his men landed in September 1898. There is also a monument in the town dedicated to the veterans of the Spanish–American War, though the monument does not specify to which veterans it is dedicated, the Americans or the Spanish/Puerto Ricans. Nearby, in Yauco, there is a monumental tombstone dedicated to an unknown Spanish soldier who had fallen in combat and was left there on that very spot. In Coamo there are two markers that indicate the place where Rafael Martínez Illescas and Frutos López died. López's tomb is located in the old cemetery of Coamo next to that of the tomb of the three unknown Puerto Rican soldiers who perished in that conflict. Martínez Illescas' body was transferred in 1916 to his hometown of Cartagena in Spain, where he is buried now. The municipality of Guayama, however, has recently dedicated a monument dedicated to the members of the 4th Ohio Infantry. In Asomante, there is a marker which indicates the place where the "Battle of Asomante" took place.

== See also ==
- Army of Puerto Rican Occupation Medal
- Military history of Puerto Rico
- Camp Las Casas
- Spain–United States relations
- Politics of Puerto Rico
- El Grito de Lares
- Intentona de Yauco
- Puerto Ricans in World War I
- Puerto Ricans in World War II
- Puerto Ricans in the Vietnam War
- 65th Infantry Regiment
