= Battle of San Juan =

Battle of San Juan may refer to:

- Battle of San Juan (1595), an English attack on San Juan, Puerto Rico
- Battle of San Juan (1598), an English attack on San Juan, Puerto Rico
- Battle of San Juan (1625), a Dutch attack on San Juan, Puerto Rico
- Battle of San Juan (1797), a British attack on San Juan, Puerto Rico
- Battle of San Juan and Chorrillos, an 1881 battle between Chile and Peru
- Battle of San Juan del Monte, an 1896 attack on a Spanish magazine in San Juan del Monte, Manila, Philippines
- First Battle of San Juan (1898) or Bombardment of San Juan, a naval bombardment initiated by an American fleet against the Spanish fortifications of San Juan, Puerto Rico
- Second Battle of San Juan (1898), a naval engagement off San Juan, Puerto Rico
- Third Battle of San Juan (1898), a Spanish sortie to rescue a blockade runner off San Juan, Puerto Rico

== See also ==
- Battle of San Juan Hill, a land battle in Cuba outside Santiago de Cuba in 1898
- Puerto Rican Campaign of 1898
