= Yauco (disambiguation) =

Yauco may refer to:

- Yauco, Puerto Rico, a municipio of Puerto Rico
- Yauco barrio-pueblo, administrative center of Yauco
- Yauco metropolitan area, a metro area
- Yauco River, a river
- Yauco Battle Site, in 19th century battle site
