= Antonio López (shipwreck) =

Historic Spanish ship shipwrecked in waters near Dorado, Puerto Rico

- SS Antonio López Shipwreck Site and Remains
- U.S. National Register of Historic Places
- U.S. National Historic Landmark
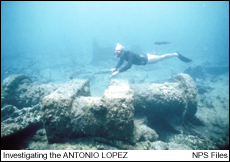

- Location within Puerto Rico
- Nearest city: Dorado, Puerto Rico
- Coordinates: 18°28′48″N 66°13′50″W
- Built: 1882
- Architect: Antonio López López, Peter Denny
- NRHP reference No.: 93001593

Significant dates
- Added to NRHP: February 9, 1994
- Designated NHL: December 9, 1997

Antonio L. López was a merchant steamship that was built in Scotland in 1882 for the Spanish Compañía Transatlántica Española (CTE). A United States Navy auxiliary cruiser sank her in the Spanish–American War when she was trying to run the US blockade to supply materiél to the Spanish garrison on Puerto Rico. She is now the only known Spanish shipwreck in US waters from the war. Her wreck site, in 1,700 feet (520 m) of water off Dorado, Puerto Rico, was designated a National Historic Landmark in 1997.

== Building ==
William Denny and Brothers built Antonio López in Dumbarton, Scotland, launching her on November 8, 1881 and completing her in 1882. Her registered length was 384.0 ft (117.0 m), her beam was 42.2 ft (12.9 m), her depth was 27.4 ft (8.4 m) and her tonnages were 3,709 GRT and 2,238 NRT. She had a single screw, driven by a two-cylinder compound steam engine that was rated at 634 NHP. CTE named her after its founder Antonio López y López, and registered her at Barcelona.

== Loss ==
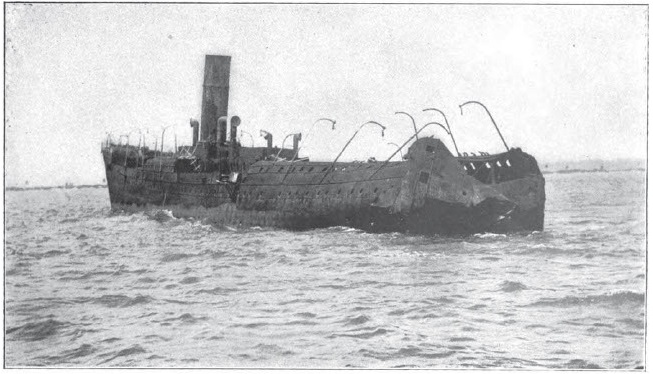
Antonio Lopez's burnt-out hulk

In June 1898 Antonio L. Lopez was bound for San Juan, Puerto Rico from Cádiz. On June 28 two US cruisers fought a squadron of Spanish ships comprising one cruiser, two gunboats and Antonio L. López, which had a cargo of military supplies. USS Yosemite pursued and shelled Antonio L. Lopez, which ran aground at Ensenada Honda.

Claudio López Bru (1853–1925), Antonio López López's son, then owner and president of the company, sent a telegram to the ship's captain saying:

Es preciso que haga usted llegar el cargamento a Puerto Rico aunque se pierda el barco. (You must get your cargo to Puerto Rico, even if the ship were lost.)

Captain Ramón Acha Caamaño was given charge of salvaging the ship's cargo. His men quickly salved nearly all of it. Only some minor articles and one cannon that had fallen overboard during salvage work were lost.

== See also ==
- Puerto Rican Campaign
- Compañía Transatlántica Española
- Claudio López Bru
- List of United States National Historic Landmarks in United States commonwealths and territories, associated states, and foreign states
- National Register of Historic Places listings in northern Puerto Rico
