= Ramón Acha Caamaño =

Puerto Rican Spanish Army general

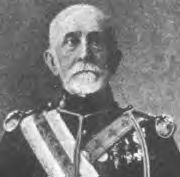
- Brigadier General Ramón Acha Caamaño
- Born: April 24, 1861; San Juan, Puerto Rico
- Died: November 26, 1930 (aged 69); Las Palmas de Gran Canaria, Spain
- Military career
- Allegiance: Spain
- Branch: Spanish Army
- Service years: 1882–1930
- Rank: Brigadier General
- Commands: Artillery Corps of Valladolid, Spain
- Conflicts: Spanish–American War: Battle of San Juan
- Awards: The Cross of the Order of the Military Merit 1st class The Cross of the Order of Naval Merit 1st class

Ramón Acha Caamaño (April 24, 1861 – November 26, 1930) was a brigadier general in the Spanish Army. As Captain in charge of the Spanish Artillery in San Juan, he defended Puerto Rico against U.S. attack during the Spanish–American War.

Caamaño was awarded the Cruz de la Orden de Merito Naval Primera Clase (The Cross of the Order of the Naval Merit 1st class) by the Spanish government for his role in the rescue of the cargo of the SS Antonio López, (Note: The SS ANTONIO LÓPEZ Shipwreck Site and Remains are listed in the National Register of Historic Places #93001593,) a Spanish transoceanic steamer. In 1921, while Spain was involved in the Rif War, Caamaño served as commander of the Artillery Corps in defense of Valladolid, Spain.

== Early years ==
Caamaño was born in San Juan, the capital city of Puerto Rico, to Antonio Acha Arrigoitia and Dolores Caamaño Federico. He received his primary and secondary education in his hometown. On September 1, 1878, he was sent to Spain where he attended the Military Artillery Academy of Segovia. Caamaño graduated from the academy on July 24, 1882, and was commissioned a lieutenant in the Spanish Army.

== Military career ==
He served in Spain's Sexto Regimiento a Pie (Sixth Infantry Regiment) and on February 11, 1883, was sent to his homeland Puerto Rico, where he served as captain of the Artillery Battalion. He also served as military instructor at Puerto Rico's Military Academy until July 1891, when he was reassigned to the District of Castilla in Spain. He returned to Puerto Rico in June 1893, and was assigned once more to the Artillery Battalion of San Juan.

== Spanish–American War ==
=== Puerto Rican Campaign ===
On May 8, 1898, the USS Yale captured a Spanish freighter, the Rita in San Juan Bay, this being the first hostile encounter between the warring sides in Puerto Rico. On May 9, Yale fought a brief battle with an auxiliary cruiser of Spain, name unknown, resulting in a Spanish victory. Around this time, Captain Ángel Rivero Méndez was assigned the command of the Spanish forces in the fortress of San Cristóbal in San Juan.

On May 10, the Yale returned to San Juan Bay and Rivero-Méndez ordered his men to open fire on the USS Yale with an Ordoñez 15 centimeter cannon. This was the first attack against the Americans in Puerto Rico during the Spanish–American War. For his actions, Captain Rivero-Mendez was awarded the Cruz de la Orden de Merito Militar Primera clase (The Cross of the Order of the Military Merit first class).

=== Bombardment of San Juan ===
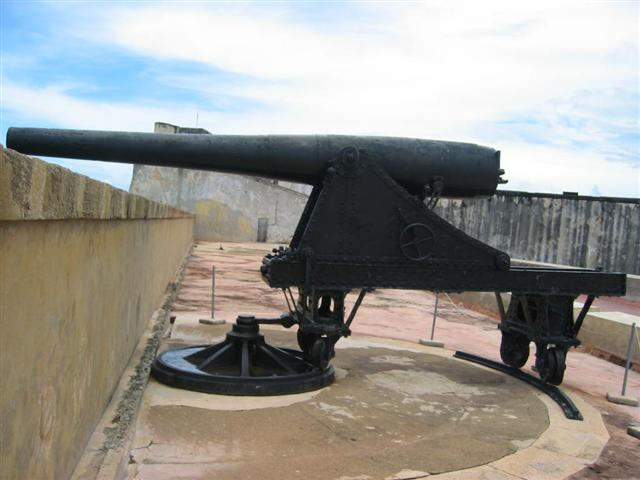
Ordoñez 15 cm cannon which opened fire on Admiral Sampson's fleet

The Bombardment of San Juan, or the First Battle of San Juan (not to be confused with the Battle of San Juan Hill or the Battle for the Río San Juan de Nicaragua), refers to an American naval attack on the fortifications of San Juan, Puerto Rico during the Spanish–American War.

For weeks, the United States Navy had been awaiting the arrival of the Spanish fleet under Admiral Pascual Cervera y Topete, unaware that he had already eluded them and slipped his squadron into the Bay of Santiago.

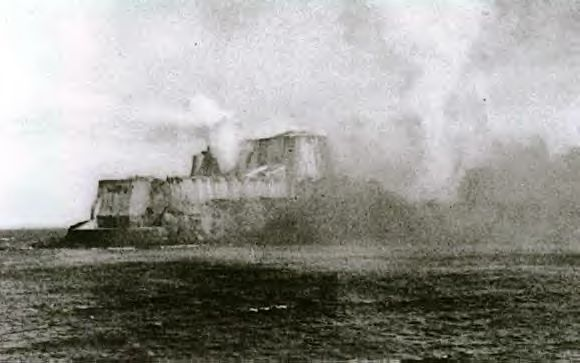
Bombardment of San Felipe del Morro

On May 12, U.S. Admiral William T. Sampson and a fleet of ten American ships arrived in San Juan to bombard the city's citadels. Caamaño and Capt. José Antonio Iriarte were among those who defended the city from their positions in Fort San Felipe del Morro. They had three batteries under their command, which were armed with at least three 15 cm (6 in) Ordóñez cannons each. The battle lasted three hours and resulted in the death of Justo Esquivies, the first Puerto Rican soldier to die in the Puerto Rican Campaign. Caamaño was awarded the Cruz de la Orden de Merito Militar Primera clase (The Cross of the Order of the Military Merit 1st class) for his actions.

After causing much damage to the Spanish defenses and receiving minor damage, low on coal and ammunition, Sampson ordered a cease fire and returned to Havana, Cuba and then to Florida for repairs and supplies.

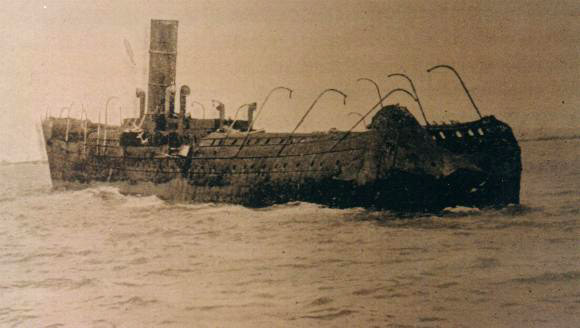
The burned out hulk of the SS Antonio Lopez

On June 28, 1898, two American cruisers fought with a squadron of Spanish warships. This squadron consisted of one cruiser, two gunboats and one blockade runner. During the engagement the "SS Antonio López," a transoceanic steamer belonging to the Compañía Transatlántica Española which had a cargo of military supplies, was pursued by USS Yosemite until it ran aground at Ensenada Honda, Puerto Rico with its valuable cargo. The men under Capt. Caamaño's command quickly removed as much as possible of the stranded ship's cargo. The desperate efforts proved fruitful, and nearly the entire cargo was salvaged from the hulk. Only one cannon and some minor articles fell overboard during the salvage operation.

On 15 July, USS New Orleans arrived to relieve Yosemite, and the next day it quickly finished off the "SS Antonio Lopez" by firing twenty incendiary shells into the vessel and sinking it. Though the Antonio Lopez had been sunk, she successfully delivered her cargo, ensuring that any American assault on San Juan would be met with stronger resistance. Caamaño was awarded the Cruz de la Orden de Merito Naval Primera clase (The Cross of the Order of the Naval Merit 1st class) by the Spanish government.

== Post war ==
The residents of San Juan were furious with Rivero and blamed him for the destruction caused to their city by the American bombardments, however nothing came of those accusations. On October 18, 1898, Capt. Rivero-Méndez was ordered to turn over the keys of all the military installations in San Juan to Captain Henry A. Reed of the U.S. Army after the Treaty of Paris of 1898 was signed.

Members of the Spanish forces and civilians who were loyal to the Spanish Crown were allowed to return to Spain. Caamaño was among those who opted to leave. By October 18, the Spanish withdrawal from Puerto Rico was completed as the final troops left San Juan for Spain.

== Return to Spain ==
Caamaño continued to serve in the Spanish Army once he arrived in Spain. In 1904, he was named director of the commission in charge of recovering Spanish military equipment left behind in Puerto Rico. He was sent to Puerto Rico and to Washington, D.C., on this mission. He served in various positions in the military and in 1908 was promoted to lieutenant colonel.

Caamaño was promoted to the rank of colonel on September 4, 1917, and placed in charge of the 3rd Mounted Regiment of Artillery. Later that same year he was named director of the Laboratorio y Centro Electrónico de Artillería (Laboratory and Electronic Center of Artillery).

From 1918 to 1922, Caamaño was assigned to the Artillery section of the Ministry of War Department. He was promoted to the rank of brigadier general on December 29, 1921. In 1921, while Spain was involved in the Rif War, Caamaño was assigned the position of Commander of the Artillery Corps in the eventual defense of Valladolid, Spain. He moved to Madrid and, on August 28, 1925, was named president of the Defense of the National Production of the National Economic Counsel.

On November 26, 1930, Caamaño died in Las Palmas de Gran Canaria, Spain.

== Military decorations ==
Among Caamaño's military decorations are the following:

- Orden del Mérito Naval Primera clase con distantivo rojo
- Orden del Mérito Militar Primera clase con distantivo blanco

== See also ==
- List of Puerto Ricans
- List of Puerto Rican military personnel
- Puerto Rican Campaign
- Military history of Puerto Rico
