= Antonio Mattei Lluberas =

Puerto Rican mayor in 1897 who led a revolt against Spain

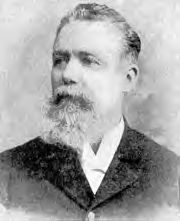
- Born: September 7, 1857; Yauco, Puerto Rico
- Died: January 15, 1908 (aged 50); Yauco, Puerto Rico
- Occupations: Businessman, politician

Notes
- Planned and led the "Intentona de Yauco" uprising.

Antonio Mattei Lluberas (September 7, 1857 – January 15, 1908), was a businessman and politician who in 1897 planned and led the second and last major uprising against Spanish colonial rule in Puerto Rico, known as the Intentona de Yauco.

== Early years ==
Mattei Lluberas was born in the town of Yauco, Puerto Rico to Antonio Mattei Casanova and Mercedes Lluberas Torres de Figueroa. Mattei Lluberas' father's parents, who were of Corsican descent, sent him to France where he received his primary and secondary education.

He returned to Puerto Rico and became a wealthy businessman after he established a successful coffee plantation. He later married Ana María Rita Emmanuelli Negroni, the (daughter of Louis Henri Emanuelli Ciavaldini b 1824 Corsica and Ana Maria Negroni Rodriguez) and had three children: Rita María, Rita Monserrate and Luis Antonio.

== Intentona de Yauco ==
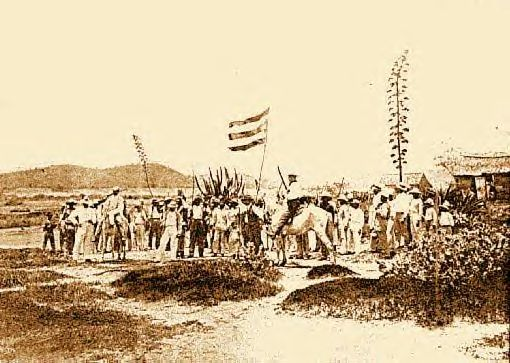
Flag flown by Fidel Vélez and his men during the "Intentona de Yauco" revolt

Mattei Lluberas was among the many Puerto Ricans at the time who professed liberal ideals and believed that Puerto Rico should be an independent nation free from Spanish Colonial rule. As such, he became involved with the island's revolutionary movement and became one of their leaders. In 1896, Mattei Lluberas met with Mateo Mercado and a group of "Yaucanos" (as the natives of Yauco are known) who believed in full independence of Puerto Rico in Barrio Barinas of Yauco and made plans to overthrow the government. On December of that year, the local Civil Guard discovered their plans and proceeded to arrest all those involved who, besides Mercado and Mattei Lluberas, included Dario and Carlos Franchesi and Emiliano Lavergue, however they were soon released and returned to their respective homes.

In 1897, Mattei Lluberas visited the Puerto Rican Revolutionary Committee in New York City. There he met with Ramon Emeterio Betances, Juan de Mata Terreforte and Aurelio Méndez Martinez and together they proceeded to plan a major coup. The uprising was to be directed by Betances, organized by Mendez Mercado and the armed forces were to be commanded by General Rius Rivera. At the time Rius Rivera, who joined José Martí's struggle for Cuban independence as a member of the Cuban Liberation Army, was the Commander-in-Chief of the Cuban Liberation Army of the West.

In accordance to the plan, Mattei Lluberas purchased 30,000 machetes which were to be distributed amongst the rebels. Mattei Lluberas returned to Puerto Rico with a Puerto Rican flag and began to proceed with the plans of the revolt with his group. The Budet Rivera brothers established an insurgent training camp in the farm of Gullermo Velazco. Fellow rebels, Gerardo Forest Velez and Agustin F. Morales (himself a general in the Army of the Dominican Republic), were in charge of propaganda and traveled throughout the island seeking public support for their cause. Cuban revolutionist Tomas Estrada Palma, offered a contribution of 500 rifles with half a million rounds of ammunition and his comrade offered a steamship with an invading force of 200 men under the command of General Agustin F. Morales. The revolution was set for the beginning of the month of December 1897.

The Mayor of Yauco Francisco Lluch Barreras heard the rumors of the planned uprising, he immediately notified General Sabas Marín González the governor of the island.

Fidel Velez, a native of Sabana Grande and one of the separatist leaders, found out that the Spanish authorities knew about their plans and immediately held a meeting with Mattei Lluberas and the other leaders. Fearing that they all would soon be arrested, he demanded that the insurrection start immediately and not in December. In the discussion that followed, the other leaders did not agree with him, fearing that such a haste action would lead to the same disastrous results of El Grito de Lares.

On March 24, 1897, Fidel Velez and his men met at Susua Arriba, just outside Yauco. They unfurled the Puerto Rican flag for the first time in Puerto Rican soil. and marched towards the town. They planned to attack the barracks of the Spanish Civil Guard with the aim of gaining control of the arms and ammunition which were stored there. The plan did not succeed because when they arrived they were ambushed by the Spanish forces who had set up positions and were waiting for them. A firefight ensued upon the arrival of the group and the rebels quickly retreated. On March 26, another group headed by Jose Nicolas Quiñones Torres and Ramon Torres attempted to fight the Spaniards in a barrio called "Quebradas" of Yauco, however said revolt also failed. Over 150 rebels were arrested, accused of various crimes against the state and sent to prison in the City of Ponce. Velez fled to St. Thomas where he lived in exile, while Mattei Lluberas went into exile in New York City and joined a group known as the "Puerto Rican Commission".

== Spanish–American War ==
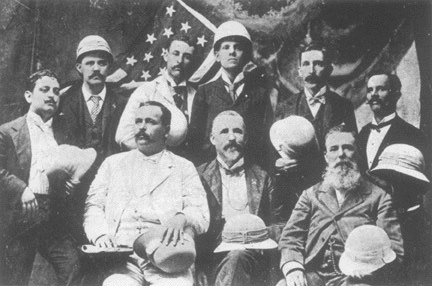
Portorrican Commission members (from left to right) Pedro Juan Besosa, Rafael Marxuach, José Budet, Warren Sutton, Domingo Collazo, Emilio González, Rafael Muñoz, Mateo Fajardo, and Antonio Mattei Lluveras

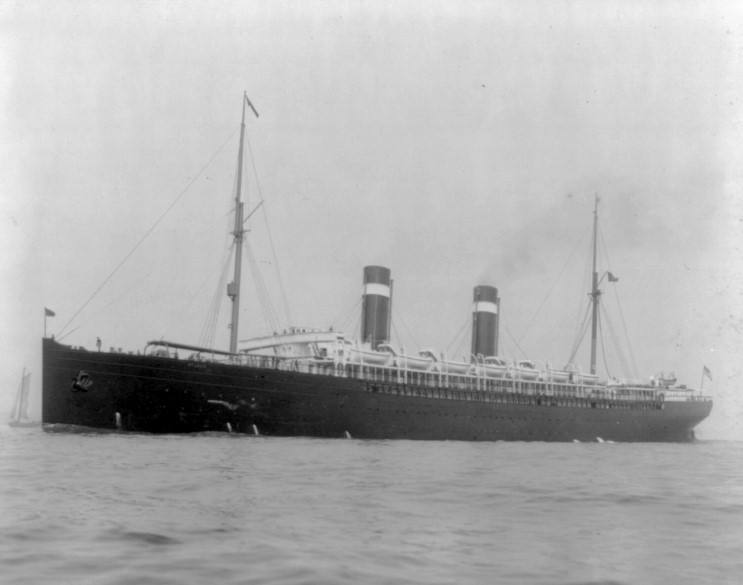
USS St. Louis

Mattei Lluberas and the Puerto Rican Commission in New York had been trying to convince President William McKinley to invade Puerto Rico for sometime. After Cuba was taken during the Spanish–American War, President McKinley approved the land invasion of Puerto Rico. A convoy of ships left Tampa, Florida and on July 21 another convoy departed from Guantánamo for a 4-day journey to Puerto Rico. Major General Nelson A. Miles, Commanding General of the Army, opted to land his troops in the southern region of the island, picking Guánica, at the time a part of the municipality of Yauco, as his landing zone. On July 31, 1898, Mattei Lluberas and his group arrived in Ponce aboard the USS St. Louis and were assigned to the headquarters of General Miles. On August 13, the Puerto Rican Campaign came to an end. Under the terms of the Treaty of Paris of 1898, ratified on December 10, 1898, Puerto Rico was annexed by the United States.

== Later years ==
In 1904, Mattei Lluberas was elected Mayor of Yauco as a candidate of the pro-statehood Republican Party of Puerto Rico. Mattei Lluberas died on January 15, 1908. The town of Yauco honored his memory by naming an avenue after him.

== See also ==
- List of Puerto Ricans
- Intentona de Yauco
- Corsican immigration to Puerto Rico

== Ancestors ==
Ancestors of Antonio Mattei Lluberas

8.
4.
9.
2. Antonio Mattei Casanova
10.
5.
11.
1. Antonio Mattei Lluberas; Yauco, Puerto Rico
12.
6. Francisco Lluberas
13.
3. Mercedes Lluberas Torres de Figueroa
14.
7. Lorenza de Torres y Figueroa
15.
