= Spanish gunboat General Concha =

Gunboat of the Spanish Navy, 1882–1913

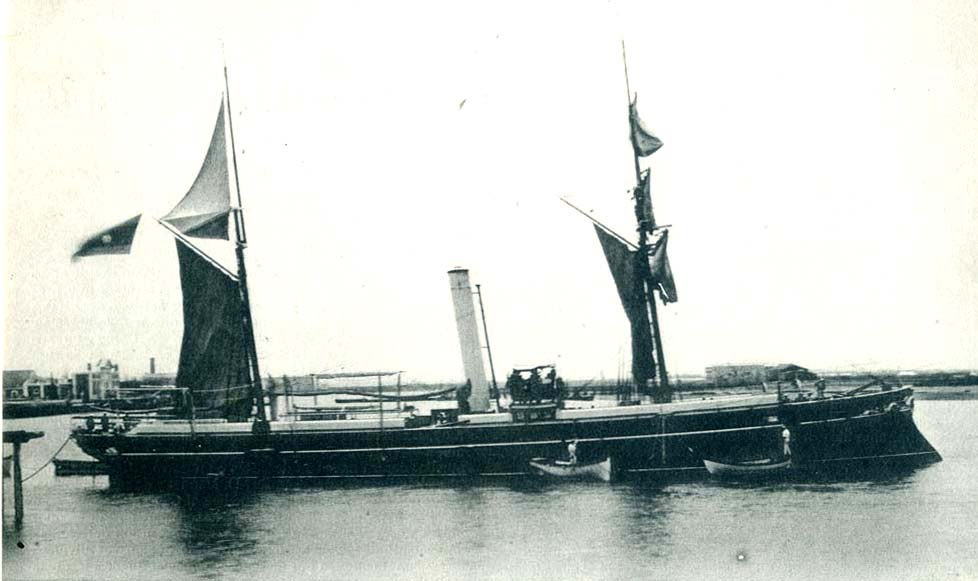
- General Concha gunboat

History

Spain
- Name: Cañonero General Concha (Crucero no protegido de Tercera Clase)
- Namesake: General Concha
- Builder: Naval shipyard Esteiro at Ferrol, Spain
- Way number: Shipyard order Nr. 169
- Laid down: 1 May 1882
- Launched: 28 November 1883
- Fate: Wrecked 11 June 1913

General characteristics
- Class & type: General Concha-class gunboat
- Displacement: 524 tons
- Length: 48.76 m (160 ft 0 in)
- Beam: 7.8 m (25 ft 7 in)
- Draft: 2.62 m (8 ft 7 in)
- Installed power: 600 hp (450 kW)
- Propulsion: 2-shaft, compound reciprocating, 2 boilers
- Sail plan: light schooner rig
- Speed: 11 knots (20 km/h; 13 mph)
- Complement: 98 officers and enlisted
- Armament: 3 × 4.7 in (119 mm) Hontoria guns; 2 × 25 mm Nordenfelt machine guns; 1 × 11 mm Nordenfelt machine gun
- Notes: 80 tons of coal (normal)

General Concha was a General Concha-class Cañonero (gunboat) or more technically "Third Class non-armored Cruiser" of the Spanish Navy which fought at San Juan, Puerto Rico, during the Spanish–American War.

== Construction and description ==
General Concha was built at the naval shipyard Esteiro at Ferrol, Spain, working order #169. She had an iron hull with bow ram, a single funnel, and a light schooner rig. She was the first ship of a class of four gunboats ordered by Admiral Francisco de Paula Pavía y Pavía during his third term as Ministro de Marina (Minister of the Navy). The design was made in Spain. The keel was laid down on 1 May 1882 and the ship was launched on 28 November 1883. The 600-horsepower (450 kW) engine with two boilers was constructed by La Maquinista Terrestre y Maritima SA in Barcelona at a final cost of 312,000 pesetas and was constructed directly aboard the ship, after being towed from Ferrol to Barcelona by the merchant vessel José Pérez. Bunker coal stock capacity was 70–80 tons having an average consumption of 10 tons per day.

Initially, weaponry was led by three main 120 mm (4.7 in) "González Hontoria" guns (a heavy armament for a gunboat, which made her being technically categorised as "Cruiser, Third Class" in spite of being a standard gunboat in all other aspects) and three Nordenfelt-type machine guns, two 25 mm (1.0 in) and one 11 mm (0.4 in), but sometime after late 1899 the ordnance was changed to a lighter four rapid-fire 42 mm (1.7 in) Nordenfelt guns and two 25 mm Maxim machine guns.

She was named after Spanish Navy Brigadier Don Juan Gutiérrez de la Concha, governor of the intendency of Salta del Tucumán, then part of the Viceroyalty of the Rio de la Plata, and explorer of Patagonia in a 1779 expedition. He was executed by the first independent Argentine government in August 1810, near the city of Cruz Alta, Córdoba, along with Santiago de Liniers and other counter-revolutionaries.

== Operational history ==
After becoming fully operational and ready for duty the General Concha was assigned to the then Spanish colony of San Juan, Puerto Rico where she served mainly as a coastal surveillance vessel until the Spanish–American War began in April 1898.

The U.S. Navy soon established a permanent blockade of San Juan on 18 June 1898. On 22 June 1898 General Concha, the cruiser Isabel II, and the destroyer Terror came out of port to test the blockade, resulting in the Second Battle of San Juan. The auxiliary cruisers USS St. Paul and USS Yosemite moved in, resulting in a short, running gun battle, from which the Spanish quickly broke away. Isabel II and General Concha had a poor top speed of 11 knots (20 km/h; 13 mph); Terror made a torpedo run on St. Paul to cover their retreat, and was badly damaged by gunfire from St. Paul, but all three Spanish ships made it back into port at San Juan. Two men had been killed aboard Terror, the only casualties on either side suffered during the battle.

On 28 June 1898, General Concha, Isabel II and gunboat Ponce de León left port again to assist a Spanish blockade runner, the merchant steamer Antonio López, trying to make its way into San Juan's harbor with an important cargo of war supplies. Yosemite intercepted Antonio López and attacked it making her run aground in nearby reefs. General Concha arrived first and engaged Yosemite, thwarting the efforts of the Americans to disrupt the undergoing salvage operation. The three Spanish warships exchanged long-range gunfire with St. Paul, Yosemite, and cruiser USS New Orleans, with neither side scoring any hits.

After the war General Concha returned to Spain and her armament was refitted to four rapid-fire 42 mm Nordenfelt guns and two 25 mm Maxim machine guns. She was assigned to the Mediterranean coast of Morocco, as part of the effort to interrupt piracy and arms smuggling by the local cabilas, usually patrolling the area between Melilla and Alhucemas.

=== Wreck ===
On 11 June 1913 General Concha sailed from Almuñécar, Granada, in mainland Spain to Alhucemas, a Spanish stronghold in the Moroccan coast. In command of the ship was Capitán de Corbeta Don Emiliano Castaño Hernández and aboard was (as a passenger) Colonel Basterra. Upon reaching the Moroccan coast the ship encountered dense fog and continued inbound to Alhucemas at slow speed, but lack of sight from coastal references after some time led the crew to misinterpretation of the position of the ship and some five miles out from her destination she violently ran aground near the cove of Busicú at 07:40 local time. This area was de facto controlled by the Bocoy cabila, a group of Morocco rebels fighting the Spaniards.

The ship was trapped among rocks with her bow pointed to the coast, so immediately an anchor was moored from the stern to try to free her, unsuccessfully. A rowboat was lowered to closely evaluate the extent of the hull damage. All bow compartments, the pantry and some engine room sections were flooded, and all rifles stored in the bow armory room were reallocated to the officers' room amidships. The armed boat nr.2 was launched, with eight seamen led by Alférez de Navío Don Luis Felipe Lazaga with the mission of reaching Alhucemas to communicate the distress of the vessel and also evacuate Colonel Basterra.

The local insurgent forces soon realized the compromised situation of the Spanish vessel and began harassing the crew of General Concha with spare rifle shots from the nearby cliffs. The crew was forced to fight the attackers and undergo repairs in the damaged bow section at the same time. The bow 120 mm gun turned out to be inoperative, being partially below waterline. During this first shooting two crew were killed. Several other men including Alférez de Navío Don Rafael Ramos Izquierdo y Gener were also wounded. The doctor, Don Manuel Quignon, improvised a "medical room" in a compartment inside the ship. With a rope he wrapped around himself a mattress as improvised protection and came to the outside deck, exposed to fire, dragging all the wounded and dead to the inside of the ship for treatment.

An attempt was made by three men to reach the aft 120 mm gun to fire back but now the whole outer deck was well covered by abundant rifle fire and two died and the third was badly wounded. The rest of the crew were forced to stay inside the ship.

About 12:30 the attackers left their positions and began an assault on the wrecked ship, boarding her by the partially submerged bow section and taking several prisoners here. But in the aft section the Alférez de Navío Ramos had rallied all remaining and able crew (some 20 or 25 men), most armed with rifles and some others with revolvers and even with axes launched a counterattack as a last chance to maintain control of the ship, forcing the looters in the bow to withdraw from the deck back to their row boats with many casualties. However, they took a total of 11 crew men with them. The commander, D. Emiliano Castaño, was hit two times in the neck and the collarbone and died, and Alférez de Navío Izquierdo had to take command of the remainder of ship and crew.

Having now a bargaining element with the captive men of the crew the pirates ceased the attack and withdraw except for some remaining snipers on the cliffs. A few hours later one of the crew prisoners was freed and sent back to the wrecked General Concha with instructions from the rebels to surrender the ship in exchange for spare the lives of prisoners and crew, otherwise they would blow the ship with dynamite. The proposition was considered but not accepted nor answered by the Spanish officers, being the ship already damaged beyond repair. Both parties engaged again in an exchange of rifle fire from fixed positions, as the attackers did not make any further attempt to directly assault the boat. Finally at 17:00 Spanish reinforcements arrived (gunboat Lauria and steamer Vicente Sáenz) and took the crew to safety.
