= Third Battle of San Juan (1898) =

Naval battle of the Spanish–American War

- Part of the Spanish–American War
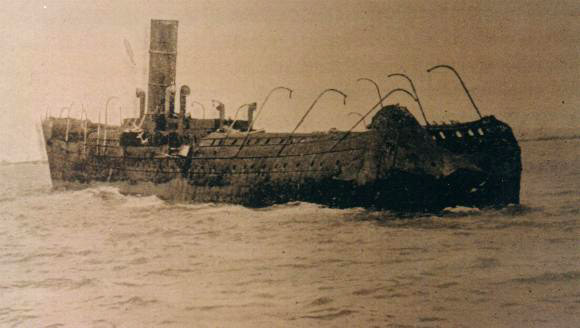
- The burned out hulk of the blockade runner SS Antonio Lopez
Date	28 June 1898
Location	San Juan, Puerto Rico
Result	Inconclusive: Successful Spanish resupply mission; Blockade runner sunk

Belligerents
Spain	United States

Commanders and leaders
unknown	William H. Emory Jr.

Strength
1 unprotected cruiser 2 gunboats 1 blockade runner 1 castle 1 fort	1 auxiliary cruiser

Casualties and losses
1 blockade runner 5 wounded	None

The Third Battle of San Juan began on 28 June 1898 when an American auxiliary cruiser intercepted a Spanish blockade runner. A Spanish squadron attempted to rescue the blockade runner and succeeded in taking off supplies and her crew but failed to save the ship, which the American warship engaged and forced to run aground.

== Prelude ==
Puerto Rico had been under attack by US Navy forces under the command of Rear Admiral William T. Sampson since just before the Bombardment of San Juan early on in the war. The only Spanish effort to break the blockading forces had failed on 22 June, and instead of actively engaging the Americans the Spanish forces were bottled up in harbor at the capital of San Juan. Blockade runners had on occasion slipped through the San Juan Blockade, but were often driven away or captured before ever nearing the harbor. The SS Antonio Lopez was a transport turned blockade runner that had been disarmed and fitted out at Cádiz, Spain and set sail on June 16 for San Juan with a large supply of cargo, food, and twelve modern artillery pieces to bolster the defense of San Juan. On 28 June, she was met by the American auxiliary cruiser USS Yosemite which had just relieved the USS Saint Paul as the blockading ship off San Juan. The auxiliary cruiser was crewed by members of the Michigan Naval Militia and commanded by William H. Emory Jr.

== Battle ==
With the blockade runner in sight, Yosemite began chase and opened fire on the vessel firing a shot. Antonio Lopez wasted no time and began to flee towards the protection of San Juan's Fort San Felipe del Morro and Fort El Cañuelo while Yosemite kept up its fire upon the vessel. As she was running for San Juan, the blockade runner became up on a reef, as the captain was quite unfamiliar with the waters in the area. Unable to free his vessel and taking casualties, the captain of the Spanish vessel ordered his crew to abandon ship. As the American vessel closed in on her prey, the Spanish forts opened fire and Emory began zig-zagging in order to avoid taking their fire.

In an effort to save the Antonio Lopez and its much needed cargo, the Spanish squadron, bottled up in the harbor, sortied out to rescue her. The Spanish gunboats General Concha and Ponce de Leon (Note: Note: Some sources state that Terror not Ponce de Leon was the third ship. However, most of the sources say that Terror was inactive at this time having been put out of action during the Second Battle of San Juan.) and the cruiser Isabel II rushed to the blockade runner's aid and attacked the approaching American cruiser. As soon as the American vessel was in range, the forts opened fire. The Spanish cruiser's fire temporarily drove off Yosemite, but the American auxiliary cruiser soon returned and managed to force Isabel II and General Concha to the protection of the coastal forts while Ponce De Leon hid behind the burning Antonio Lopez. Under the protection of the Spanish forts and vessels, the blockade runner was unapproachable by Yosemite and with the Spanish transport on fire and effectively neutralized she moved back to her blockading position. Yosemite had done her job effectively though, and Antonio Lopez was stranded on the reefs and could not be dislodged, despite strenuous Spanish efforts to do so.

== Aftermath ==
With a renewed attack by Yosemite looming, the Spanish under the command of Captain Ramón Acha Caamaño were quick to remove as much of the stranded ship's cargo as possible. Their desperate efforts proved fruitful in that they were able to salvage nearly the entire cargo from the hulk. They left behind only some minor articles and one cannon that had fallen overboard during salvage operation. On 15 July, USS New Orleans arrived to relieve Yosemite, and the next day it quickly polished off Antonio Lopez by firing twenty incendiary shells into the vessel, sinking it. Though Antonio Lopez had been sunk, she had successfully delivered her cargo, ensuring that any American assault on San Juan would be met with stronger resistance. Today, the wreck of the SS Antonio Lopez is a National Historic Landmark and a public dive site.

== See also ==
- Puerto Rican Campaign
