= Yauco Battle Site =

Site of the Battle of Yauco in Guánica, Puerto Rico

- U.S. National Register of Historic Places
- U.S. Historic district
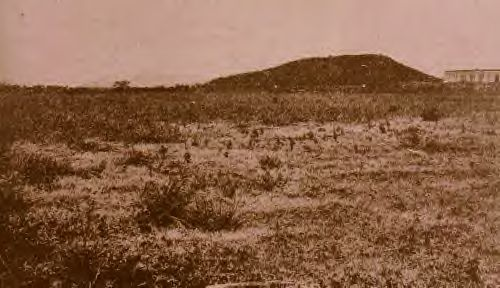
- Part of the Hacienda Desideria, where the Battle of Yauco took place in 1898

- Location within Puerto Rico
- Nearest city: Guánica, Puerto Rico
- Coordinates: 18°00′03″N 66°53′16″W
- Area: 127.013 acres (51.400 ha)
- MPS: Spanish–American War in Puerto Rico MPS
- NRHP reference No.: 00001383
- Added to NRHP: September 2, 2008

The Yauco Battle Site is the site of the Battle of Yauco between Spanish and American forces in the municipality of Guánica, Puerto Rico on July 25 and 26, 1898. It includes agricultural fields plus the main house and a slave building of Hacienda Desideria, a coffee plantation in a small valley about 4 kilometres (2.5 mi) from the town of Guánica, which was headquarters of a Spanish military unit. It was the site of the first major confrontation in the Puerto Rican Campaign of the Spanish–American War.

A 127.013-acre (51.400 ha) area was listed on the National Register of Historic Places in 2008. Non-contributing elements in the listed area include a portion of SR 166R, a 20th-century bridge, and Hacienda Quiñones' main house.
