= Hacienda Santa Rita =

Historic sugar plantation in Guánica, Puerto Rico

- U.S. National Register of Historic Places
- U.S. Historic district – Contributing property
- Puerto Rico Historic Sites and Zones
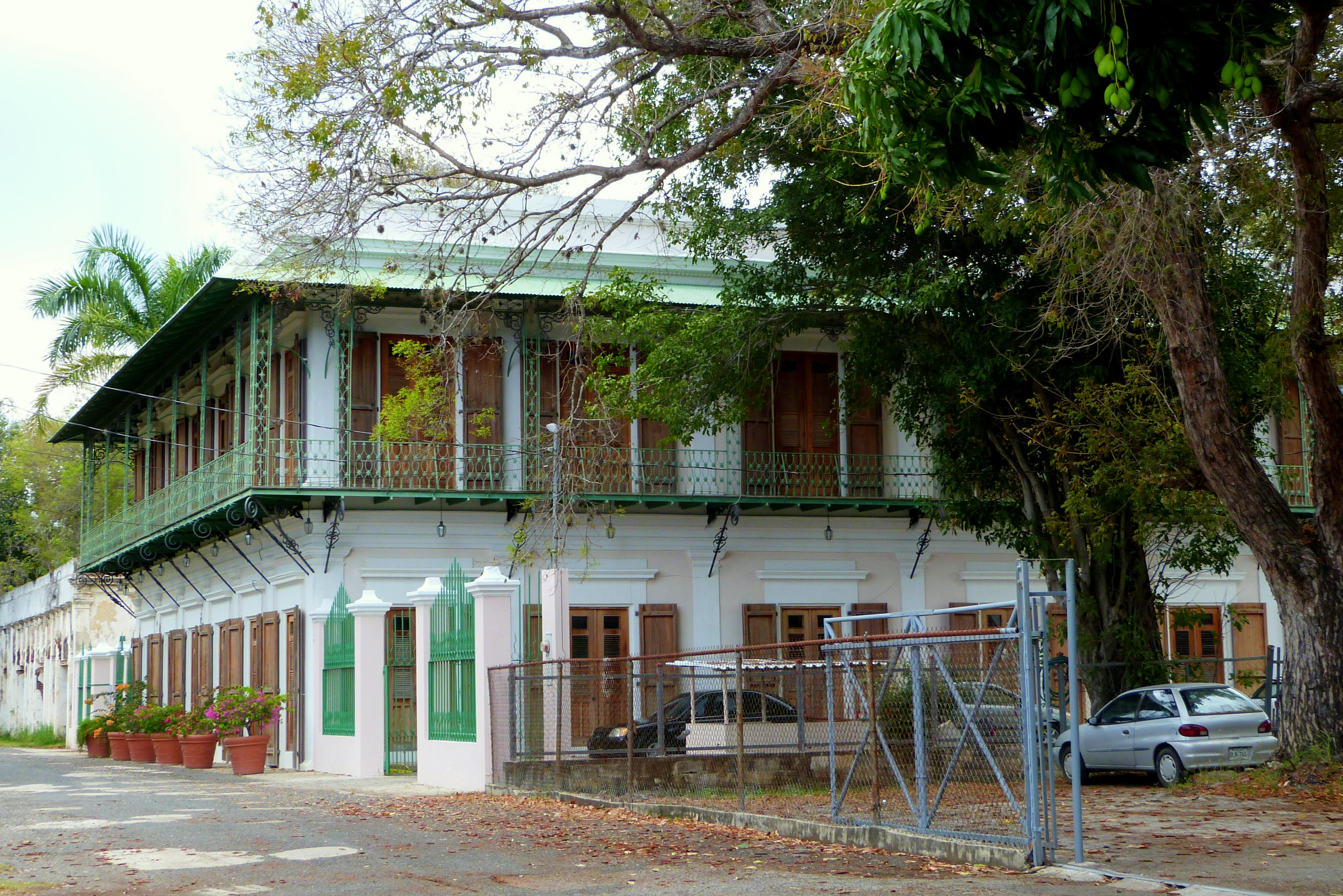
- The main house of the hacienda in 2017

- Location within Puerto Rico
- Nearest city: Guánica, Puerto Rico
- Coordinates: 18°00′27″N 66°53′03″W
- Built: 1800
- Architect: Guinonez, Mariano
- Part of: Yauco Battle Site
- NRHP reference No.: 84003147
- RNSZH No.: 2000-(RO)-19-JP-SH

Significant dates
- Added to NRHP: January 5, 1984
- Designated RNSZH: December 21, 2000

Hacienda Santa Rita is located in the municipality of Guánica, Puerto Rico. It is also known as Casa Madre y Noviciado de las Hermanas Dominicas de Fatima and was built in 1800 by Don Mariano Quiñonez.

It was listed on the U.S. National Register of Historic Places in 1984 and on the Puerto Rico Register of Historic Sites and Zones in 2000.

It consists of buildings of a former sugar plantation, Hacienda Desideria, including a main house and slave quarters.

During the Spanish–American War in 1898, the building was used by the Spanish military and then by the Americans. Generals Guy Vernor Henry (Note: The reference states General Guy B. Henry stayed there. Assuming that is a typo, it was presumably Guy Vernor Henry, who soon became Governor of Puerto Rico.) and A. Garreston stayed at the house.

From 1953 on it was used by, and from 1962 owned by, the Dominican Order of Our Lady of Fatima. The main house has been used as a convent and novice house.
