= Puerto Rican Commission =

Political group

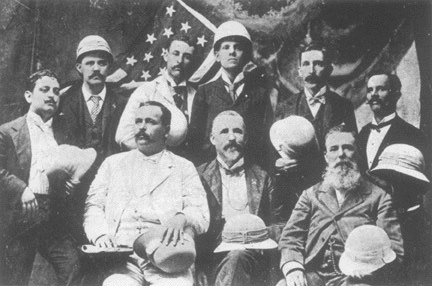
Portorrican (sic) Commission members (from left to right) Pedro Juan Besosa, Rafael Marxuach, José Budet, Warren Sutton, Domingo Collazo, Emilio González, Rafael Muñoz, Mateo Fajardo, and Antonio Mattei Lluveras

The Puerto Rican Commission (Portorrican Commission) was a political group composed of prominent, pro-American Puerto Rican expatriates that accompanied a U.S. expeditionary force sent to assist in the invasion of Puerto Rico during the Spanish–American War of 1898.

The Commission or "volunteers", as they were otherwise known, that landed at Arroyo on 1 August 1898 consisted of: Pedro Juan Besosa, José Budet, Domingo Collazo, Mateo Fajardo, Emilio González, Antonio Mattei Lluberas, Rafael Marxuach y Abrams, Rafael Muñoz, and Warren Sutton (the only American in the group). Once disembarked, the Commission assisted in effectuating the transition of police, administrative, juridical, and – most importantly – political power to American military and civilian authority.

Many of the original Commission "volunteers" had, pre-war, promoted insurgent and annexationist causes, as a result of which they had caught the interest of Spanish authorities. The Puerto Rico Commission's 1 August 1898 landing at Arroyo was both the definitive manifestation and the fruition of their annexationist and pro-American goals.
