= Ensenada Honda (Culebra, Puerto Rico) =

Beach in Culebra Island, Puerto Rico

Ensenada Honda (Deep Cove), Culebra, Puerto Rico
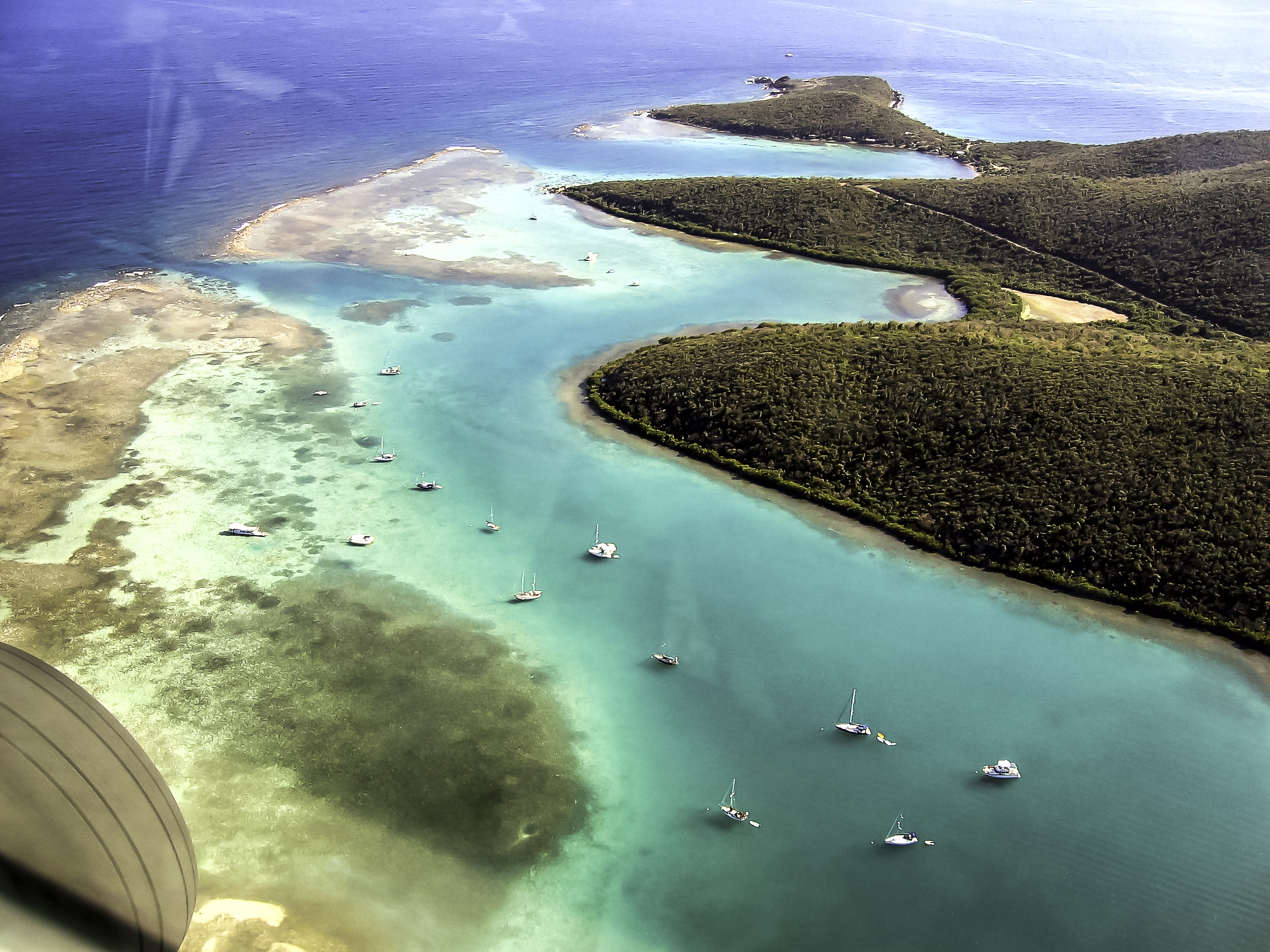
- Entrance to Ensenada Honda

- Ensenada Honda in Culebra, Puerto Rico
- Location: Culebra, Puerto Rico
- Coordinates: 18°18′09.7″N 65°17′10.7″W
- Type: Bay
- Ocean/sea sources: North Atlantic Ocean
- Managing agency: Department of Natural and Environmental Resources, Puerto Rico Ports Authority
- Islands: Cayo Pirata
- Settlements: Culebra, Puerto Rico

Ensenada Honda (English: Deep Cove), also known as "Puerto Grande" (English: Big Port) and "Bahía Honda" for its elongated shape, is the largest inlet on the island of Culebra, Puerto Rico.

== Geography ==
Since the 19th century, observers have deemed Ensenada Honda among the safest Caribbean harbors. (Note: In 1989 Hurricane Hugo, however, laid waste to much of Culebra and sank about 100 of the 300 ships that have taken refuge in the bay.) Its irregular coastline features rocky cliffs, sandy beaches, and mangrove forests. Three smaller inlets gate the cavernous cove: "Malena" and "Dakity" to the west, and "Mosquito" to the east. A number of distinct coral specimens inhabit the area around Culebra, and some communities have flourished at the very bay's entrance. They form bars barely above sea level and block portions of its opening.

== Environmental history ==
For most of the 20th century (1902-1975) the bay served as grounds for military training, as wreckage left from the time reveals. Explosions and the resulting contamination left pulverized underwater craters and diminished the health of sea life. But low-tech, community-based programs and coral grafting have expanded the reefs' fields and increased their bio-diversity. The bay is today an eco-tourist destination, celebrated for its turtles, and the center of the local fishing industry.

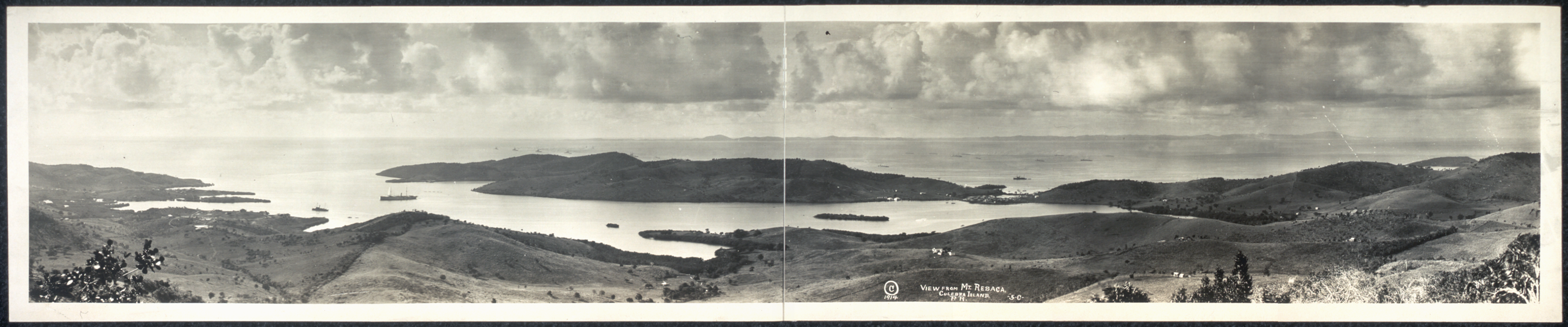
View of Ensenada Honda from Mt. Resaca, Culebra Island, P.R.

== See also ==
- Ensenada Honda (Ceiba, Puerto Rico)
- San Juan Bay
- Mayaguez Bay
- Culebra Island giant anole
- Flamenco Beach
