= USS Yosemite (1892) =

Auxiliary cruiser of the United States Navy

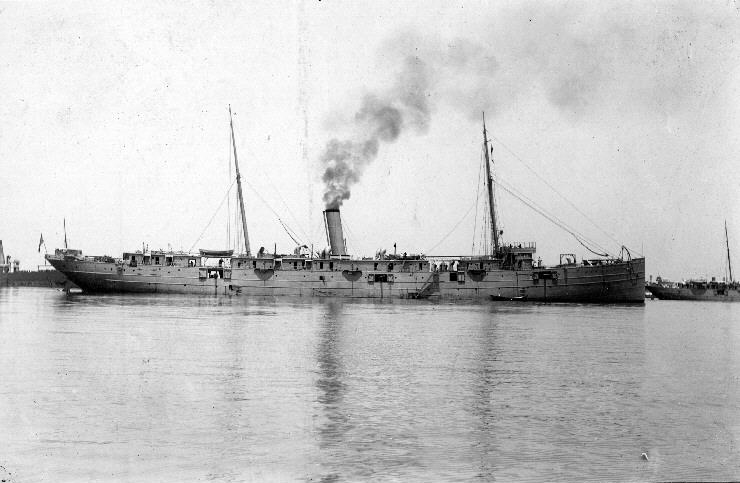
- USS Yosemite in 1898.

History

United States
- Name: USS Yosemite
- Namesake: Yosemite Valley
- Builder: Newport News Shipbuilding & Drydock Co.
- Launched: 16 March 1892
- Acquired: 6 April 1898
- Commissioned: 13 April 1898
- Fate: Scuttled 15 November 1900

General characteristics
- Type: Auxiliary cruiser
- Tonnage: 6,179 long tons (6,278 t)
- Length: 389 ft 2 in (118.62 m)
- Beam: 48 ft (15 m)
- Draft: 20 ft 1 in (6.12 m)
- Speed: 16 knots (30 km/h; 18 mph)
- Complement: 285, 173 15 November, 1900
- Armament: 10 × 5 in (130 mm) guns; 6 × 6-pounder guns; 2 × Colt machine guns

The first USS Yosemite was an auxiliary cruiser of the United States Navy. Built as El Sud in 1892 by Newport News Shipbuilding and Dry Dock Company, in Newport News, Virginia for the Southern Pacific Railroad's Morgan Line. The Navy acquired El Sud on 6 April 1898, at the beginning of the Spanish–American War and renamed her Yosemite. It commissioned her on 13 April 1898 under Commander William H. Emory.

== Service history ==
=== Spanish–American War, 1898 ===
After fitting out at League Island, Philadelphia, and at Newport News, Virginia, Yosemite departed Hampton Roads on 30 May for duty with the Eastern Squadron off the coast of Cuba. She stopped at Key West, Florida for five days and then headed for Havana on 7 June, arriving there the same day. Yosemite. She left Havana the next day; visited Santiago and Guantánamo Bay on the 10th; and then, after a brief return to Santiago, headed for Kingston, Jamaica on the 12th. The auxiliary cruiser spent the night of 16 and 17 June at Kingston and returned to Cuban waters on the 19th. On 23 June, she cleared the Guantánamo Bay area for San Juan, Puerto Rico. She arrived off San Juan on the 25th to participate in the blockade of that port.

Soon after her arrival, Yosemite intercepted the Spanish steamer SS Antonio Lopez at 5:20 AM on 28 June when the latter tried to run into San Juan, beginning the Third Battle of San Juan. In spite of heavy covering fire from enemy shore batteries and gunboats Ponce de Leon, Isabella II, and Concha, Yosemite attacked the blockade runner and succeeded in pounding her almost to pieces. She expended 251 5-inch (127-mm) shells in the encounter. At the conclusion of that encounter, the auxiliary cruiser pulled back out of range of the gunboats and their protecting shore batteries to resume her blockade station. She concluded that assignment on 15 July and, after a three-day visit to St. Thomas in the Danish West Indies (Virgin Islands), headed back toward the Virginia Capes on the 18th.

=== 1898–1900 ===
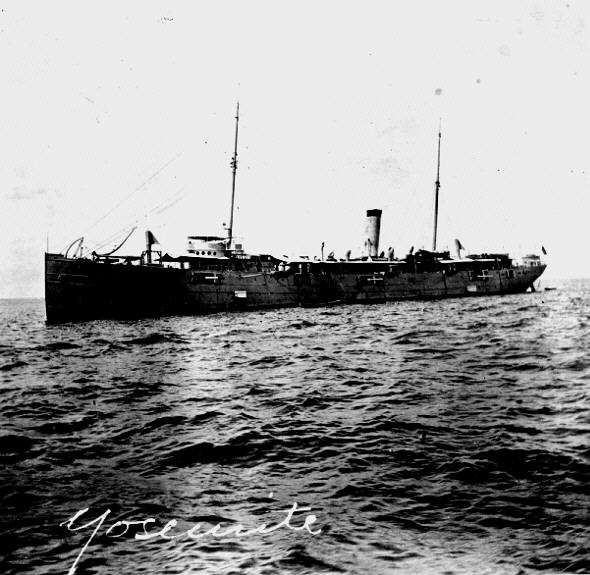
USS Yosemite, photographed during the Spanish-American War, 1898

Yosemite arrived at Hampton Roads on 22 July and remained there until 15 August, two days after hostilities ceased. For almost a month, she operated along the Atlantic coast. Between 8 and 19 September, the auxiliary made a voyage to Haiti and then resumed east coast operations briefly before putting in at League Island on 23 September—apparently for repairs because she remained until late in December. Yosemite departed League Island on 29 December and arrived in Norfolk on the 30th. The ship remained there until 8 April 1899 at which time she got underway for New York. Following a month-long stay, the auxiliary cruiser departed New York on 10 May for duty in the Mediterranean Sea, the Suez Canal, and the Indian Ocean. She arrived in the Mariana Islands, at San Luis d'Apra on Guam, on 7 August.

She spent the next eight months at Guam surveying the harbor and serving as station ship. On 17 April 1900, Yosemite departed Guam for a voyage to Japan where she underwent repairs at Yokohama and Uraga. Following a brief visit to Nagasaki on 7 and 8 June, the ship headed for the Philippines on the 9th. She arrived in Cavite on the 14th and began additional repairs. On 30 June, Yosemite completed repairs and set a course for Guam. She reached the harbor at San Luis d'Apra on 6 July and resumed duty as station ship. Between 2 and 29 August, she made a round-trip voyage back to Cavite to pick up stores for Guam. Upon her return to Guam, Yosemite resumed station-ship duties.

On 13 November 1900, the former auxiliary cruiser was blown from her anchorage by a particularly violent Typhoon-striking reefs twice and then out to sea from Apra Harbor. Probably while still blowing around the harbor her steam launch sank killing 5 crewmen. For two days, her crew tried to save their ship while it blew 60 miles north and then 40 miles west, but she shipped water badly and, due to a damaged screw, made only two knots headway even after the storm passed. Finally, after the weather abated completely, her crew was taken off by the U.S. Navy collier USS Justin and Yosemite was scuttled, or foundered from leaks, on 15 November.
