= Feliz (disambiguation) =

Feliz is a municipality in the Brazilian state of Rio Grande do Sul.

Other uses of Feliz or Féliz include:

== People ==
=== Given name ===
- Feliz Vaz (born 1989), Portuguese professional footballer

=== Middle name ===
- Leopoldo Felíz Severa (fl. 1917–1920), Puerto Rican politician

=== Surname ===
==== Athletes ====
- Andrés Feliz (born 1997), Dominican basketball player
- Juan Feliz (born 1937), Spanish sprint canoer
- Lidio Andrés Feliz (born 1997), Dominican sprinter
- Michael Feliz (born 1993), Dominican baseball pitcher
- Noemí Feliz (born 1988), Spanish swimmer
- Neftalí Feliz (born 1988), Dominican baseball pitcher
- Pedro Feliz (born 1975), Dominican baseball infielder

==== Other ====
- Antonio A. Feliz, American religious figure
- Arturo Féliz-Camilo (born 1977), Dominican author and chef
- Jandy Feliz (born 1977), Dominican singer-songwriter
- Jordan Feliz (born 1989), American Christian musician
- José Vicente Feliz (c. 1741 – 1822), Spanish-Mexican soldier and settler
- Lesandro Guzman-Feliz (2002–2018), American high-school student and murder victim
- Oswald Feliz (born 1990), American politician in New York City
- Rhenzy Feliz (born 1997), American actor
- Rolando Florián Féliz (died 2009), Dominican drug trafficker and convicted murderer

== Places ==
=== Communities ===
==== Brazil ====
- Alto Feliz, in Rio Grande do Sul
- Espera Feliz, in Minas Gerais
- Feliz Deserto, in Alagoas
- Feliz Natal, in Mato Grosso
- Porto Feliz, in São Paulo

==== United States ====
- Los Feliz, Los Angeles, California
- Ojo Feliz, New Mexico

=== Other ===
- Ayala Malls Feliz, a shopping mall in Metro Manila, Philippines
- Can Feliz, summer residence of Danish architect Jørn Utzon near Portopetro, Mallorca
- Los Feliz Boulevard, a street in Glendale and Los Angeles, California, United States
- Rancho Feliz, historical Mexican land grant in present-day San Mateo County, California, United States
- Rancho Los Feliz, historical Spanish land concession in present-day Los Angeles County, California, United States

== Songs ==
- Feliz (song), 2009 Latin pop song performed by Kany García
- Feliz Navidad (song), 1970 Christmas song by José Feliciano
- Tan Feliz, 2009 song by American artist Pee Wee

== Other uses ==
- Aero Feliz, a defunct Mexican passenger airline
- Feliz! (TV program), an annual television special on New Year's Eve
- Feliz Navidad (disambiguation), Spanish phrase meaning "Happy Christmas"

== See also ==
- Felix (disambiguation)
- Filiz
