= 1st Senate of Puerto Rico =

First meeting of senators of the Senate of Puerto Rico

The First Puerto Rican Senate, under United States occupation, was the first meeting of senators of the Senate of Puerto Rico elected as part of the legislative branch of their government. Elections for the Senate of Puerto Rico were authorized by passage of the Jones-Shafroth Act in 1917. It authorized elections to be held on July 6, 1917 for representative government in the legislature.

The Senate met from August 13, 1917, to January 2, 1920. The voters elected a majority of members from the Union of Puerto Rico party, who chose Antonio R. Barceló as President of the Senate.

== Party summary ==
Affiliation	Party (Shading indicates majority caucus)			Total	
Affiliation	Union	Republican	Socialist	Total	Vacant
Begin	13	5	1	19	0
Latest voting share	68.4%	38.5%			

== Leadership ==
Position	Name	Party	District
President of the Senate	Antonio R. Barceló	Union	VII
President pro Tempore	Eduardo Georgetti	Union	At-large
Majority Leader		Union	
Majority Whip		Union	
Minority Leader		Republican	
Minority Whip		Republican	

== Members ==
District	Name	Party
I - San Juan	José de Jesús Tizol	Union
I - San Juan	Ramón Valdés Cobián	Union
II - Arecibo	Félix Santoni	Union
II - Arecibo	Francisco M. Susoni	Union
III - Aguadilla	Francisco Seín	Union
III - Aguadilla	Juan García Ducós	Union
IV - Mayagüez	Leopoldo Felíz Severa	Republican
IV - Mayagüez	Juan Angel Tió	Republican
V - Ponce	José Tous Soto	Republican
V - Ponce	Juan Cortada Tirado	Republican
VI - Guayama	Mariano Abril y Ostalo	Union
VI - Guayama	José Rovira	Union
VII - Humacao	Antonio R. Barceló	Union
VII - Humacao	José J. Benítez Díaz	Union
At-Large	Frank Martínez	Union
At-Large	Eduardo Georgetti	Union
At-Large	Martín Travieso, Jr.	Union
At-Large	José Celso Barbosa	Republican
At-Large	Santiago Iglesias	Socialist

== Employees ==
- Secretary:
  - José Muñoz Rivera
- Assistant Secretary:
  - Eugenio Astol
- Sergeant at Arms:
  - Manuel Palacios Salazar
