= Tizol =

Tizol is a surname. Notable people with the surname include:

- José de Jesús Tizol, Puerto Rican politician, senator and delegate
- Juan Tizol (1900–1984), Puerto Rican jazz trombonist and composer
- Lolita Tizol, early twentieth-century Puerto Rican violinist and music educator
