= Ducos =

Ducos may refer to:

== People with the surname ==
- Jean-Ernest Ducos de La Hitte, French nobleman
- Jean-François Ducos (1765–1793), French politician
- Juan García Ducós, Puerto Rican politician and senator
- Louis Arthur Ducos du Hauron (1837–1920), French pioneer of color photography
- Maurice Ducos (born 1904), French swimmer
- Roger Ducos, French political figure
- Théodore Ducos (1801–1855), French politician and shipowner
- Zoe Ducós (1928–2002), Argentinian actress

== Places ==
- Canton of Ducos, Martinique
- Ducos, Martinique
- Ducos Peninsula, New Caledonia

== Other ==
- Pierre Ducos, character in Sharpe
