= Nova Milano =

Historic site on the municipality of Farroupilha, Brazil

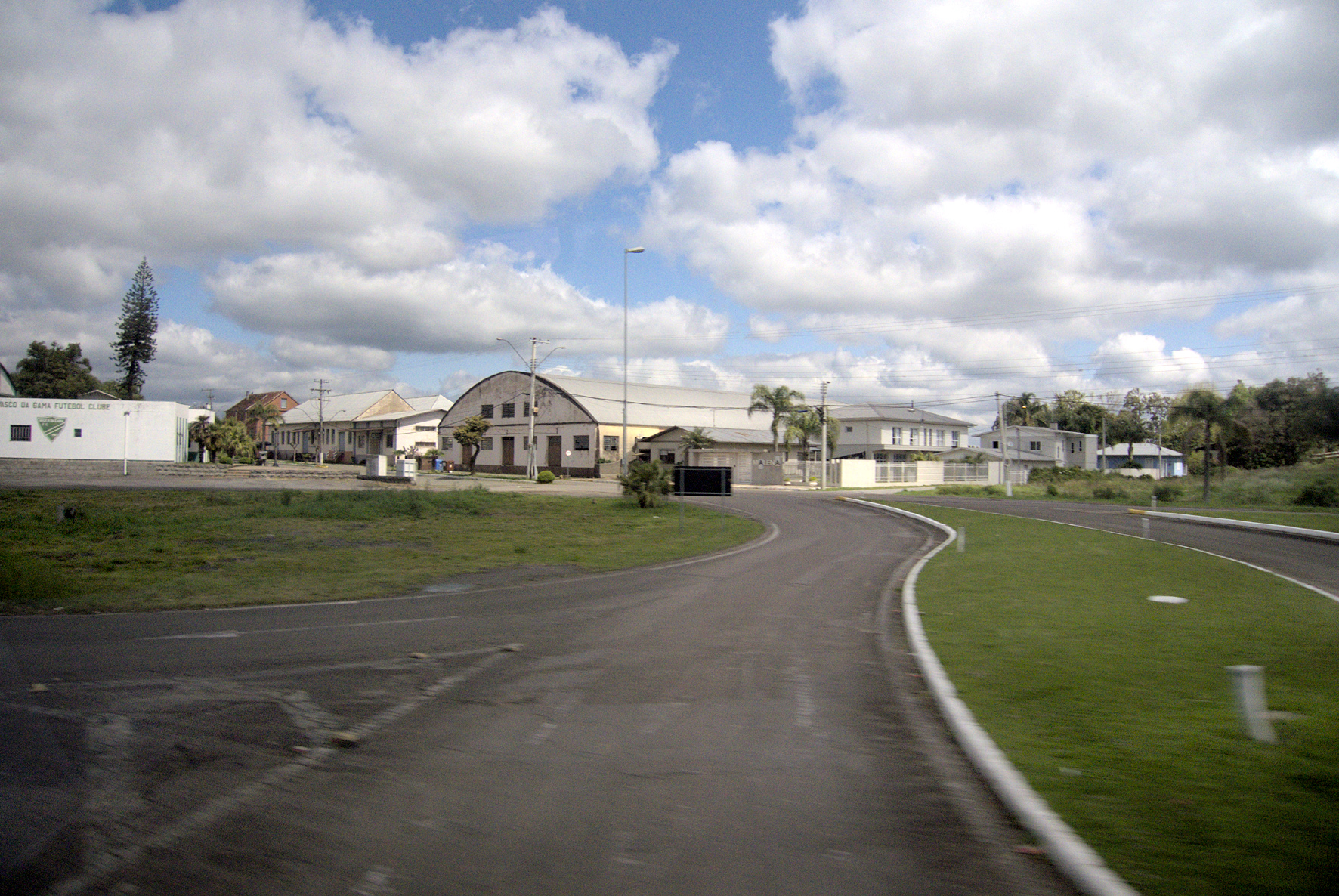
One of the entrances to Nova Milano. On the left you can see part of the headquarters of Vasco da Gama FC.

Nova Milano is a historic site and the seat of the fourth district of the Brazilian municipality of Farroupilha, considered the birthplace of Italian colonization in the state of Rio Grande do Sul. Originally the headquarters of the Caxias Colony, a pavilion was set up there in 1875 to welcome the immigrants who were waiting to be placed in the colonies in the region. In 1876 the colonial headquarters was transferred to Campo dos Bugres, but Nova Milano, on the margins of a very busy road, became a village, and in 1902 became the headquarters of the third district of Caxias. The arrival of railroads in 1910 determined a reorganization in the road and economic structure of the region, harming the growth of Nova Milano, which in 1934 was incorporated to the new municipality of Farroupilha as its fourth district, remaining until today with mainly rural characteristics.

In 1975 the governments of Italy and Rio Grande do Sul organized a large series of festivities and events to commemorate the 100 years of Italian colonization in the state. In Nova Milano, the Italian Immigration Park was built, with a monument, a museum and several memorials about the immigration, besides recreational spaces. The district preserves several historical buildings and has tourist potential.

== Location ==
About 100 km from the capital Porto Alegre and 8 km from the center of Farroupilha, Nova Milano is on the margins of the RS-122 highway, which connects Porto Alegre to the Serra Gaúcha region. It is bordered by the municipality of Carlos Barbosa to the southwest, by the Sesmaria Machado dividing line. It is bordered by the municipality of Alto Feliz to the south, having limits on the old Júlio de Castilhos Road. It is bounded by the municipality of Vale Real to the southeast, after Caravaggieto in the access to Forqueta Baixa. It is bordered by the municipality of Caxias do Sul to the east.

== History ==
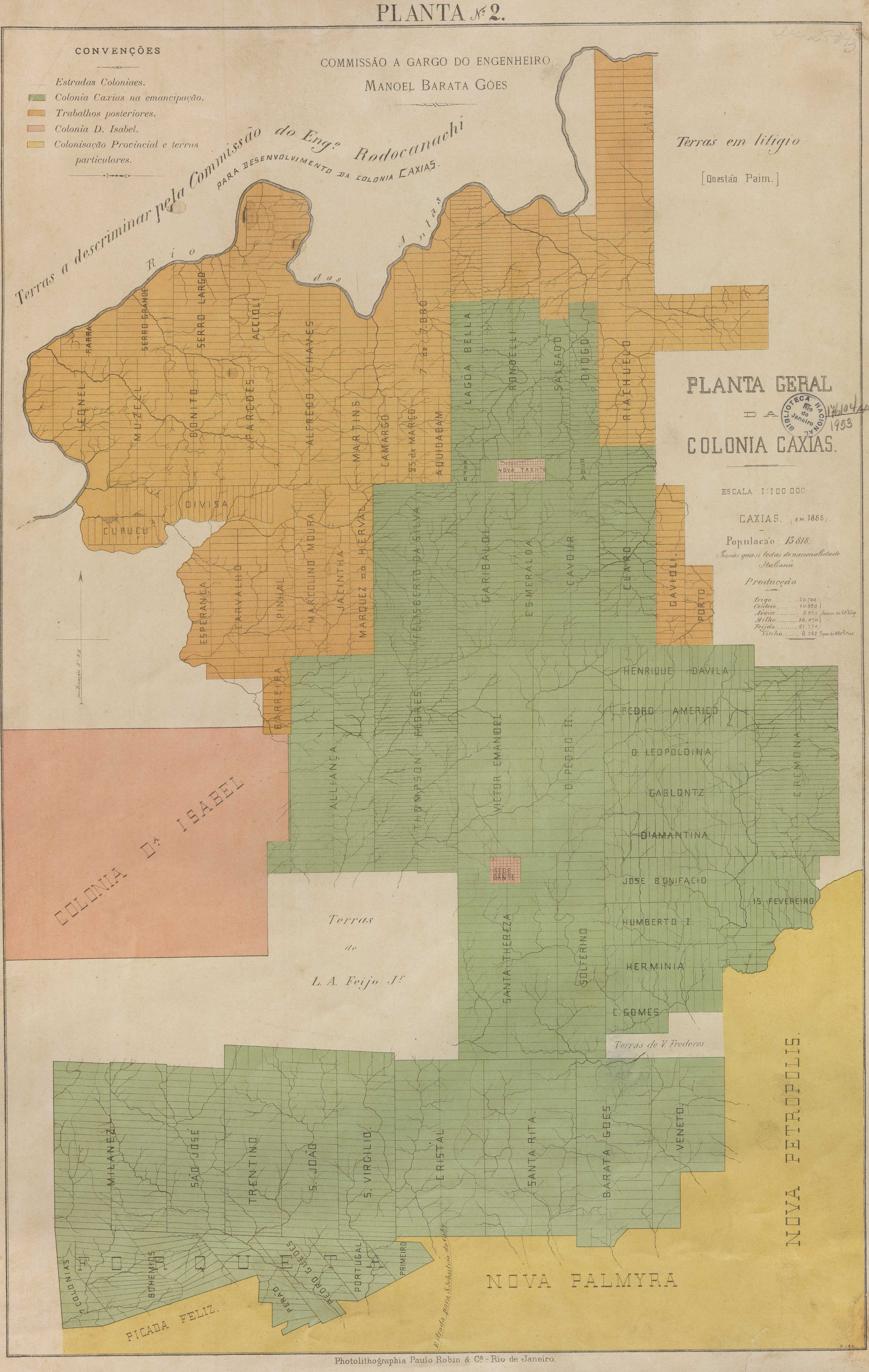
Plan of Caxias Colony (in green) from 1885. Nova Milano is in the Travessão Milanes, in the lower left corner.

The history of Nova Milano began in 1870, when the land demarcation commission sent by the imperial government to draw the limits of the new Caxias Colony camped there, part of an ambitious project of the imperial government to populate the mountainous region of the state with free workers, who would be settled in single-family lots, where they were to live as farmers and artisans. The government intended to improve the domestic supply of basic products and colonize the population with European immigrants. The applicants received government assistance for settlement. Two other colonies were demarcated at the time: Conde d'Eu and Dona Isabel, but the administration of the project was tumultuous and not very efficient, and the first immigrants faced a series of difficulties when arriving in Rio Grande do Sul. The lands closest to the rivers and valleys were already occupied by Germans, and the colonies destined for the Italians were located on the mountain slopes, rugged and previously unexplored regions.

Most Italians who arrived in Brazil at the end of the 19th century were sent to São Paulo, working on the coffee plantations, where they were poorly paid employees and lived in terrible conditions. In the south, the scheme was different: they would be owners of small single-family lots organized in rural colonies. The immigrants would travel by sea to the port of Rio Grande, from there by boat up the Patos Lagoon to Porto Alegre, where they were received in a pavilion and waited to be directed to their final destination. From Porto Alegre, they continued by boat or caravan to Montenegro or São Sebastião do Caí, from where the roads branched off to, respectively, the Conde d'Eu/Dona Isabel and Caxias Colonies.

Although the road to the Conde d'Eu Colony already existed in 1871, this colony only received Prussian, Portuguese, Spanish, German, and Swiss-French immigrants until the end of 1875; and it was from the beginning of 1875 that the flow of Italian immigrants would start. They concentrated on the road leading to the Caxias Colony, because it was connected to the important troopers' road that led to the cowsheds of the Campos de Cima da Serra and to Rio and São Paulo; and because it was from Caxias the majority of immigrants that were redirected to the colonies in the highland region.

Nova Milano was the first headquarters of the Caxias Colony, installed in its 1st Légua, in the extreme southwest of its territory, and there it was intended to build an urban center, which would concentrate the government, trade and services offered to the occupants of the rural lots of the entire colony. Soon after, the site was considered inadequate, and the headquarters was transferred to a more central and less topographically rugged location about 20 km to the northeast, in Travessão Santa Teresa of the 5th Légua, where there was a stripped plain called Campo dos Bugres, situated in the current historic center of Caxias do Sul.

According to Thales de Azevedo, on January 3, 1875, the immigrant Angelo Feraboni arrived at the site, followed by Giacomo Varaschini, Luigi Barbante and Angelo Magioni, but who took credit as pioneers were Luigi Sperafico, Tomaso Radaelli and Stefano Crippa, all from the Milan region, who would have arrived there on May 20. By September there were already 110 Italians in Nova Milano, largely from Milan, but most were soon moved to the area around Campo dos Bugres. The place ended up enshrined in the popular imagination as the "cradle" of Italian colonization in the state for having welcomed the first newcomers, and although disputed by some historians, the date of May 20, 1875 became official as the beginning of the colonization of the lands of Rio Grande do Sul.

To receive the new arrivals and temporarily lodge them until they chose their plots and settled, a shed was built in 1875, enlarged or rebuilt in 1876, which ended up baptizing the place in its early days: Barracão (big shed), where government agents maintained some legal, administrative, and technical structure, made land distribution feasible, directed the immigrants and their families to the properties, and helped them with seeds and tools. Later the place was renamed Nova Milano, in honor of the origin of the first families registered there. The name already appears on the 1885 colony plan naming the Travessão Milanese.

Even after the change of the headquarters and the opening of new accesses to the colonial region, Nova Milano continued to be important, because many people still passed through there on their way from Caí. The continuous passage of travelers made it so that around the old shed a village took shape, constituted as the headquarters of the 3rd district of Caxias on September 25, 1902, receiving notary's office, priest, church and sub-intendent. The main economic activity was agriculture. From 1910 on, the passage of the Montenegro-Caxias do Sul railroad between Nova Milano and Nova Vicenza (part of the old Colonia Sertorina) and the construction of a stop in Nova Vicenza gave birth to a new economic axis, and the urbanization started to concentrate in Nova Vicenza, stagnating the growth of Nova Milano, a situation that was accentuated when it lost its condition of seat of the 3rd district of Caxias to Nova Vicenza in 1918. In 1934 the municipality of Farroupilha was created, incorporating the district of Nova Sardenha (from the municipality of Montenegro), Linha Jansen de Bento Gonçalves (formerly Dona Isabel Colony), Nova Vicenza and Nova Milano, which was absorbed as its fourth district with the name of Emboaba. In 1949 its territory was increased at the expense of Nova Palmira and the name Nova Milano was reinstated.

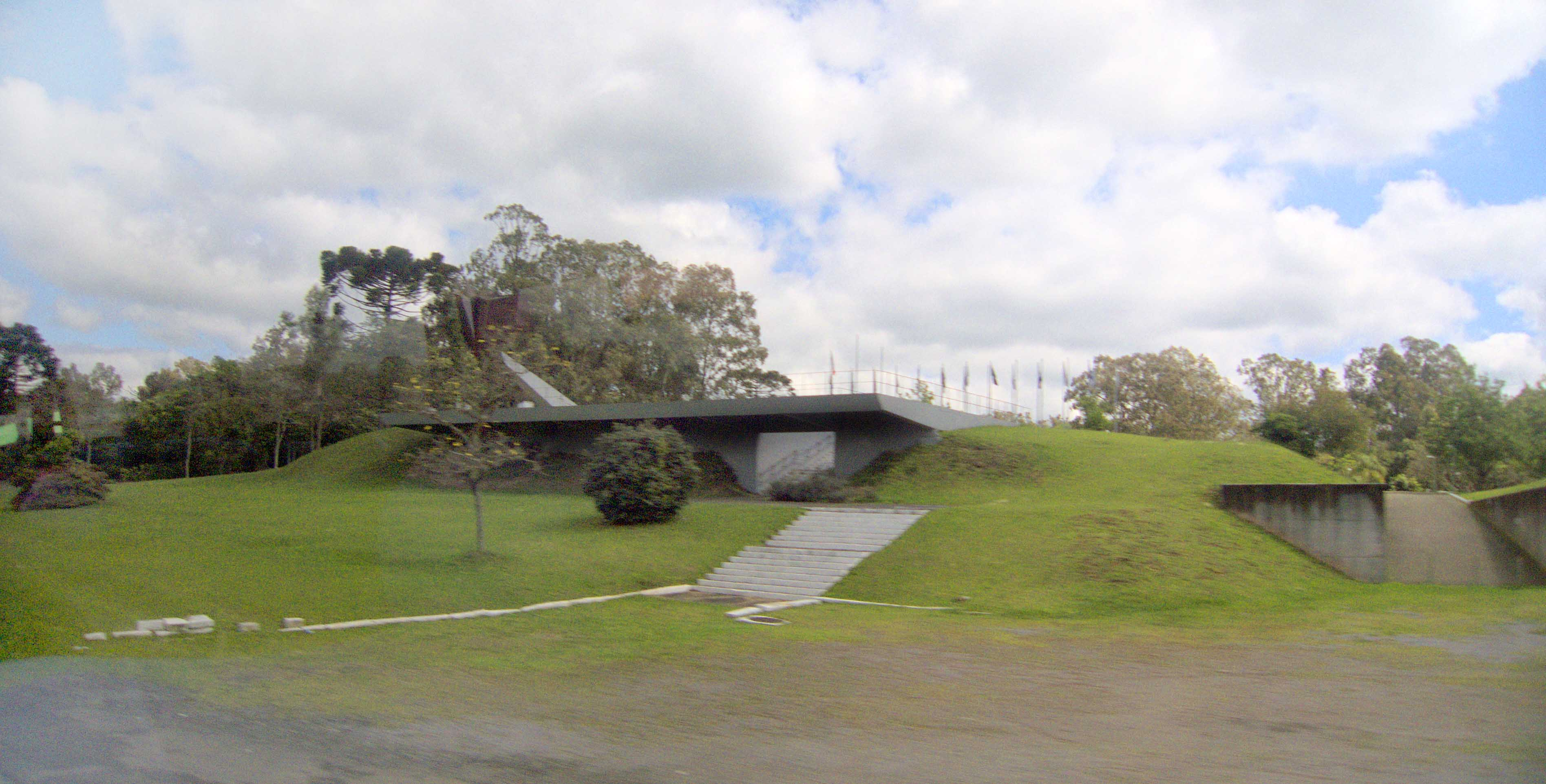
The entrance to the Immigration Park, with the monument created by Carlos Tenius, on the side of the road that immigrants used to take to go up the mountain, and which today is the RS-122 highway, at kilometer 55.

In the great celebrations of the 100 years of Italian immigration to Rio Grande do Sul in 1975, which were accompanied by an explosion in academic bibliography on the subject, Nova Milano consolidated its image as the "cradle of Italian colonization". The climax of the festivities took place on May 20, in the Immigration Square - reaffirming the date as the official beginning of the settlement process organized by the government - including a parade of floats, artistic and folkloric attractions, speeches, hoisting of flags and staging of the arrival of immigrants, attended by the president of the Republic General Ernesto Geisel, the Minister of Labor, the governor of the State, the Italian Ambassador in Brazil and the Italian undersecretary of foreign affairs, among other authorities. On December 13, again amidst great solemnities, a Park-Monument in honor of the pioneers was inaugurated, located by the roadside in the area of the old shed. Carlos Tenius, creator of the monument, said of it:

"It presents the virile Italian soul who took on the responsibility of breaking through the woods, climbing the mountains, and establishing, on Brazilian soil, their homeland. The human value of these men and women, the sacrifices, the lost children, which the new generations cannot forget, could only be presented in their absolute essence. The bare iron, without artifice, without far-fetched solutions, presents to us, all that courage and material detachment that was able to raise the highlands, a preponderant part of the Gaucho progress. These figures symbolize the jubilation of today's men for the grandiose deeds of their ancestors. And in the purity of the material used in the making of the sculptural block, is the pioneer essence, now victorious and prosperous, deserving the gratitude of its descendants. The dynamics of the winged group seeks to dominate the landscape in its upward movement, as men once dominated the earth. To the visuals, from the road, will evidence the group of figures as a single block, dominant and omnipresent, over the mountain range, light and floating, merging into the magic of nature, configuring in its expressiveness the longings of the pioneers and the gratitude of their descendants who here erect the beautiful and therefore perennial to remember them."

== Population ==
According to the 2000 IBGE census, Nova Milano had 3,258 inhabitants, with 1,184 in the urban area and 2,074 in the rural area (several surrounding localities).

In 2000, the main municipality, Farroupilha, had 55,308 inhabitants. In the 2007 population count, Farroupilha's population increased to 59,871 inhabitants. Considering that the participation of Nova Milano in relation to the municipality remained the same as in 2000, the district would have about 3.5 thousand inhabitants today.

In 1991, Nova Milano had 2,382 inhabitants, 267 in the urban area and 2,115 in the rural area. Compared with the data for 2000, it can be seen that there was a large increase in the population in the urban area, while the population in the rural area had a small decrease.

== Economy ==
Nova Milano has an economy strongly based on agriculture and viticulture. There are 15 large vegetable growers, 50 small vegetable growers, and a large number of family farmers. However, the low prices paid to grape growers have discouraged this crop. Besides this, the Emboaba Cooperative, located in the village and focused on wine production, went bankrupt in the 90's, leaving the farmers without the necessary support for production. Another relevant branch is the production of eggs, with Straggliotto Grange being the largest producer in the region.

In recent decades, other sectors have gained importance in the local economy, especially the knitwear industry. The knitwear sector has shown intense growth since the 1980s, and Farroupilha is now known as the Brazilian Capital of Knitwear. In the district, "Malena Malhas" (founded in 1989) and "Malharia Elma Kids" stand out in the infant-youth sector.

== Attractions ==
The district's tourist potential has been more recently explored. Since 1991 the Italian Traditions Gathering is organized, attracting thousands of people. In 2008 Nova Milano was included in the Caminhos da Imigração Tourist Route, in 2015 the Integrated Territorial Development Sector Plan of the urban nucleus was instituted, privileging residential and tourist uses, considering its "landscape and historical-cultural heritage potential"; in 2017 the Nova Milano Christmas was included in the official calendar of events of Farroupilha, and in 2018 the Farroupilha Colonial Tourist Route was launched, including Nova Milano.

=== Italian Traditions Gathering ===
Entrai (Italian Traditions Gathering - Encontro de Tradioções Italianas) is a festival with artistic presentations, dance, music, gastronomy, and crafts, which takes place every two years, attracting about 40 thousand visitors over five days. In 1991 the 1st Entrai was held by the Department of Culture of the Municipal Secretariat of Education and Culture (at the time the secretary was Marlene Rozina Feltrin and the mayor Clóvis Zanfeliz), with the objective of divulging and valuing Italian traditions. It was held simultaneously in Nova Milano and with its own space in the pavilions of the Cinquentenário Park, together with the 1st Fenakiwi (Kiwi National Festival - Festa Nacional do Kiwi). It became an event of great touristic importance for the city of Farroupilha and the region.

=== Italian Immigration Park ===
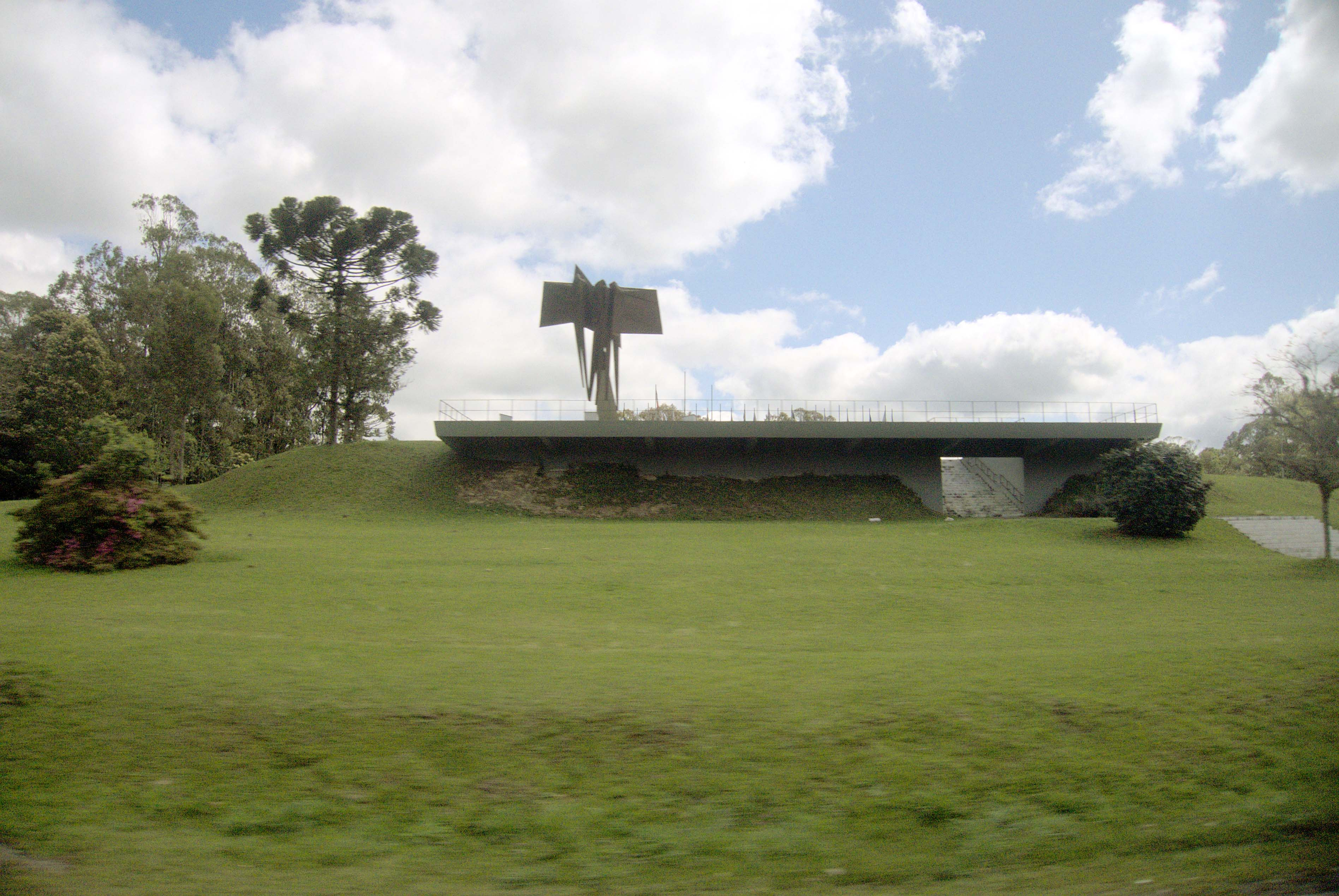
Entrance to the Immigration Park, with the Carlos Tenius monument.

With an area of 5 ha, it was built to honor the centennial of Italian immigration to Rio Grande do Sul, being inaugurated on December 13, 1975. The park has a monument, formed by a group of abstract shapes. The artwork is by artist Carlos Tenius, and the park's design belongs to architects Olmiro Pinto Gomes and Vera Maria Becker Lovato and urban planner Antônio Carlos Oliveira.

In addition to the monument, replicas of a Venetian gondola and the Lion of St. Mark, the symbol of the City of Venice, offered by the government of Italy, can be found in the park, as well as several plaques representing the most varied Italian regions. In 2018 the park was revitalized and the construction of the Museums of Italian Immigration and Grape and Wine began. The space also has a leisure structure, with a pond, children's playground, and bicycle track.

=== Italian Immigration Square ===
The square, located in the center of the community, was built in honor of the first settlers. The square is composed of several monuments, the most important of which are the replicas of the passports used by the first immigrants from Italy: Luigi Sperafico, Stefano Crippa and Tomaso Radaelli. In addition to the monuments, in the square there is the old Santa Helena da Cruz Church, built by the colonizers, with its interior painted with frescoes, and the replica of the Madonnina del Duomo, whose original stands on top of the Milan Cathedral.

== Religion ==
The Italian immigrants brought with them their religious habits and their intense faith in the Catholic religion. The district church was built by the community itself and is located in the central square. It has a tower over 30 meters high, which can be seen from practically every point in the village.

Every August the traditional feast of the patron saint of the community takes place, popularly known as the "August Festival". After the Sunday mass, lunch is served in the community hall, located next to the church.

As a testimony of the immigrants' faith, besides the church, several chapels were built in the region, which today are part of the city's cultural heritage. The main ones are the chapels of São José, Santo André, Santos Anjos, N. S. Salete, Menino Deus, São Roque, Caravaggieto, Linha Boêmios, and Sete Colônias.

== Sports ==
The community has a team, Vasco da Gama FC, which is over 50 years old, with a soccer field, a futsal court, and an open swimming pool. Vasco da Gama has an amateur field soccer team, which has already been the Gaucho champion in the youth categories and is the current champion of the first division of the Farroupilhão championship.

== Education ==
Based in Nova Milano is the Santa Cruz Municipal School, which has repeatedly received awards for good indices in education.

== See also ==
- Italian Brazilians
- Farroupilha (city)
- Rio Grande do Sul (state)
- History of Rio Grande do Sul

== Bibliography ==
- Adami, João Spadari (1971). História de Caxias do Sul 1864 - 1970 (in Portuguese). Edições Paulinas.
- Azevedo, Thales de (1975). Italianos e gaúchos: os anos pioneiros da colonização italiana no Rio Grande do Sul (in Portuguese). Nação. p. 100.
- Baretta, Rubens Cesar (2012). Estudo toponímico dos bairros e distritos de Farroupilha-RS (Thesis) (in Portuguese). UCS.
- César, Pedro de Alcântara Bittencourt (2016). "Roteiros turístico-culturais na Serra Gaúcha (RS-Brasil): escolha e formação dos percursos e seu apelo histórico memorial". Revista Brasileira de Pesquisa em Turismo. (in Portuguese) Vol. 10, no. 3. doi:10.7784/rbtur.v10i3.1042. ISSN 1982-6125.
- Cichero, Lorenzo (2000). Cinquantenario della Colonizzazione Italiana nel Rio Grande del Sud, 1875-1925 (in Portuguese). Vol. I. Posenato Arte & Cultura.
- Dal Bó, Juventino; Iotti, Luiza Horn; Machado, Maria Beatriz Pinheiro (1999). Imigração Italiana e Estudos Ítalo-Brasileiros - Anais do Simpósio Internacional sobre Imigração Italiana e IX Fórum de Estudos Ítalo-Brasileiros (in Portuguese). EDUCS.
- De Boni, Luís A.; Costa, Rovílio (1984). Os italianos no Rio Grande do Sul (in Portuguese). UCS.
- De Felice, Renzo (1979). Cenni storici sull'emigrazione italiana nelle Americhe e in Australia (in Italian). Franco Angeli.
- Dornelles, Soraia Sales (2005). O protagonismo histórico indígena no Rio Grande do Sul do século XIX: a experiência de Luis Bugre (in Portuguese).
- Fachin, Gabriela (2016). Imigração italiana na colônia Conde D'Eu e a Societá Italiana di Mutuo Soccorso Stella D'Itália (Graduation thesis) (in Portuguese). Univates.
- Iotti, Luiza Horn (1999). Política emigratória e diplomacia italiana: 1870-1914. Coletânea Cultura e Saber História. No. 2 (in Portuguese). Vol. 3. Caxias do Sul.
- Kanaan, Beatriz Rodrigues (2009). As Italianidades: Um estudo dos diferentes modos de representação de pertencimento entre descendentes de imigrantes italianos na Serra Gaúcha (in Portuguese).
- Lima, Tatiane de (2017) Os usos políticos no passado nas comemorações oficiais do Biênio da Colonização e Imigração do Rio Grande do Sul (1974–1975) (Thesis) (in Portuguese). Unisinos.
- Maestri, Mário (1999). A travessia e a mata: memória e história (in Portuguese).
- Manfio, Juliana Maria (2019). A construção de uma memória: as comemorações do centenário da imigração italiana na região da ex-colônia Silveira Martins (1975-1993) (PhD thesis). Unisinos.
