= Eduardo Martini =

Brazilian footballer (born 1979)

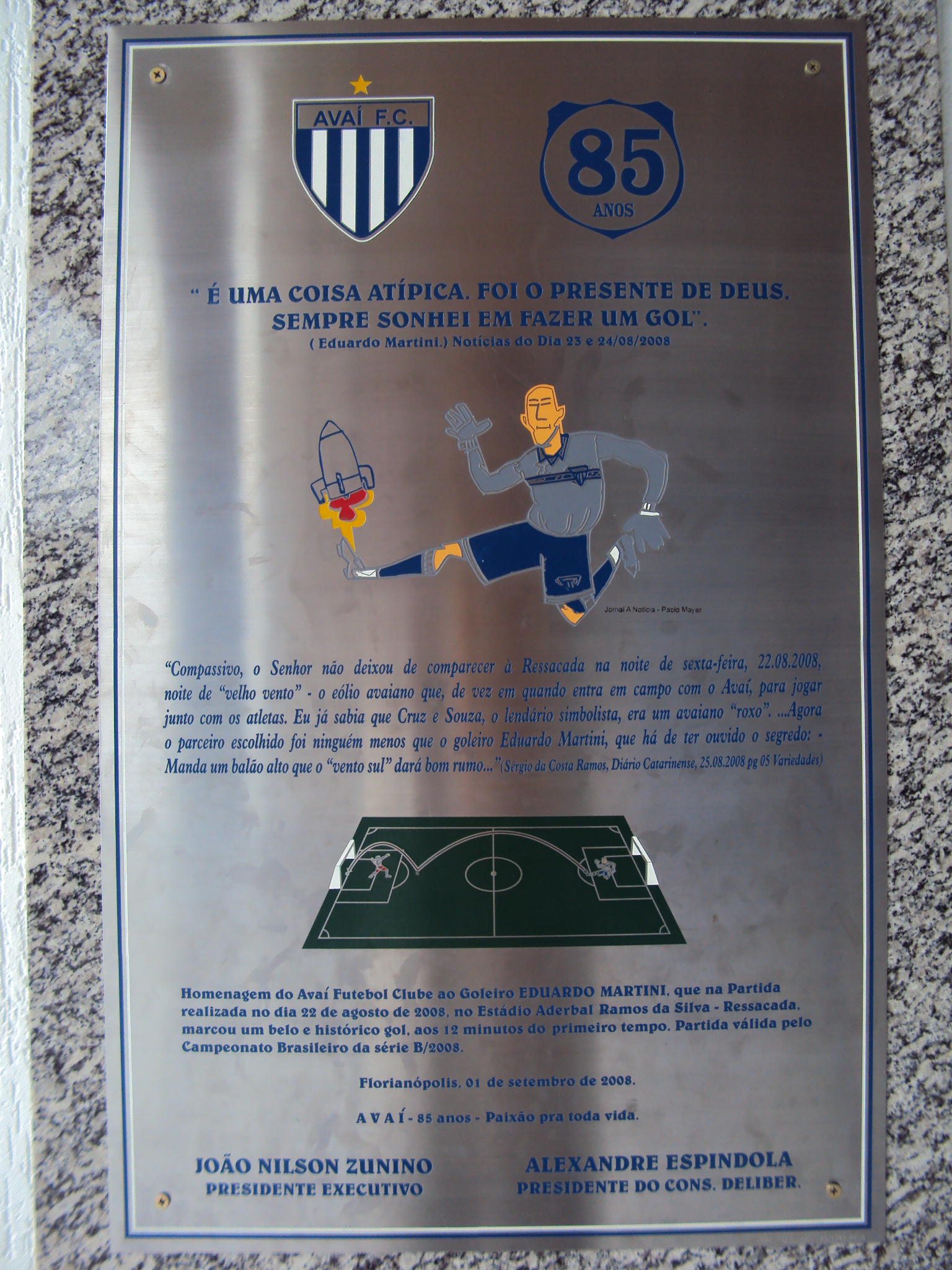

Personal information
- Full name: Eduardo Martini
- Date of birth: January 11, 1979 (age 47)
- Place of birth: Feliz, Brazil
- Height: 1.92 m (6 ft 4 in)
- Position: Goalkeeper

Youth career
- 1994–1999: Grêmio

Senior career*
Years	Team	Apps	(Gls)
2000–2003	Grêmio	18	(0)
2004–2005	Juventude	44	(0)
2006–2009	Avaí	186	(1)
2010	Ponte Preta	54	(0)
2011–2012	Novo Hamburgo	28	(0)
2013–2014	Lajeadense	39	(0)
2014–2017	Brasil de Pelotas	125	(0)
- * Club domestic league appearances and goals

Eduardo Martini (born January 11, 1979) is a Brazilian former professional football goalkeeper. He has previously played for Grêmio, Juventude, Avaí, Ponte Preta, Novo Hamburgo and Lajeadense.

== Career ==
Born on January 11, 1979, in Feliz, Rio Grande do Sul state, Eduardo Martini started his career in 1994, playing for Grêmio, of Porto Alegre, becoming a first-teamer in 2002, as a replacement for Danrlei. He played 18 Série A games for Grêmio, before joining Juventude in 2004, where he played 44 Campeonato Brasileiro Série A games. In 2006, he was transferred to Avaí, where, as of November 7, 2008, he played at least 100 games for the club. Eduardo Martini scored a goal for Avaí from his own box in a Série B game against Paraná Clube on August 22, 2008. Eduardo Martini joined Ponte Preta in December 2009 to play for the club in the 2010 season.

He joined Novo Hamburgo, on January 19, 2011, to play in the 2011 season. He moved to Lajeadense in 2013 and was close to sign with Icasa to play at the 2014 Campeonato Brasileiro Série B, but opted to join Série D side Brasil de Pelotas to stay closer to his family, achieving back-to-back promotions at his new club.
