= José Rovira =

American politician

Member of the Puerto Rico Senate from the Guayama district
- In office 1917–1920

Personal details
- Born: March 30, 1890 Guayama, Puerto Rico
- Died: April 26, 1962 (aged 72) Guayama, Puerto Rico
- Party: Union of Puerto Rico
- Profession: Politician

José Rovira Tomás was a Puerto Rican politician and senator.

In 1917, Rovira was elected as a member of the first Puerto Rican Senate established by the Jones-Shafroth Act. He represented the District VI (Guayama).
