= Frank Martínez (politician) =

Puerto Rican lawyer, politician and senator

Member of the Puerto Rico Senate from the at-large district
- In office 1917–1920

Personal details
- Born: September 3, 1884 Mayagüez, Puerto Rico
- Died: July 1, 1966 (aged 81) Río Piedras, Puerto Rico
- Party: Union of Puerto Rico
- Education: University of Barcelona (BA); Cornell Law School (LL.B)
- Profession: Politician

Frank Martínez was a Puerto Rican lawyer, politician and senator.

In 1917, Martínez was elected as a member of the first Puerto Rican Senate established by the Jones-Shafroth Act. He was elected as a Senator at-large.

== Education ==
Upon completing his primary education at the school in that city, he attended the University of Barcelona, in Spain, from which he graduated with the title of Bachelor of Arts in 1901. For his profession in life Mr. Martinez chose the law and in 1902 he entered Cornell Law School, in Ithaca, New York, and graduated from this university in 1906, obtaining the degree of Bachelor of Laws. The same year he was admitted to the New York State Bar.

== Death ==
Frank Martinez died on July 1, 1966, at age 81. He was buried at Buxeda Memorial Park in Río Piedras, Puerto Rico.
