= Santoni (surname) =

Santoni is a surname. Notable people with the surname include:

- Dante Santoni (born 1960), American politician from Pennsylvania
- Elisa Santoni (born 1987), Italian rhythmic gymnast
- Félix Santoni, Puerto Rican politician
- François Santoni, suspected of being one of the leaders of Armata Corsa, a defunct separatist terrorist organization in Corsica
- Joël Santoni (born 1943), French film director and screenwriter
- Michael Santoni Jr. (born 1964), wrestler known as Big Guido
- Nicola Santoni (born 1979), Italian football player
- Reni Santoni (born 1939), American actor
