= Francisco Seín =

Puerto Rican politician

Francisco Sein

Member of the Puerto Rico Senate from the Aguadilla district
- In office 1917–1920

Personal details
- Born: 1870 Añasco, Puerto Rico
- Died: July 11, 1946 (aged 75–76) San Juan, Puerto Rico
- Party: Union of Puerto Rico
- Education: University of Zaragoza (BA)
- Profession: Physician, Politician

Francisco Sein was a Puerto Rican politician and senator.

In 1917, Sein was elected as a member of the first Puerto Rican Senate established by the Jones-Shafroth Act. He represented the District III (Aguadilla).

He entered the Provincial Institute of San Juan, where he graduated with honor with the degree of baccalaureate in Arts. He enrolled later at the University of Zaragoza in Spain, where he graduated in 1893, and studied postgraduate studies at the Central University of Madrid. Was appointed Titular Physician of Añasco. He was also prominent in educational matters and for eight years served as President of the Lares School Board. A housing project in Lares has his name.
