= Insular Government of Porto Rico =

1900–1952 U.S. territory of Puerto Rico under civil governance

Insular Government of Porto Rico Gobierno Insular de Puerto Rico
- 1900–1952
- Flag (from 1912) Coat of arms (1902–1905)
- Anthems: "Hail, Columbia" (until 1931) "The Star-Spangled Banner"(from 1931)
- Map of Puerto Rico (red) within the Americas
- Status: Unincorporated and organized United States territory
- Capital: San Juan
- Official languages: English; Spanish
- Government: Devolved presidential dependency
- President
  - 1900–1901: William McKinley (first)
  - 1945–1952: Harry S. Truman (last)
- Governor
  - 1900–1901: Charles Herbert Allen (first)
  - 1949–1952: Luis Muñoz Marín (last)
- Legislature: Legislative Assembly
  - Upper house: Senate
  - Lower house: House of Representatives
- History
  - End of military government and start of civil governance under the Foraker Act: May 1, 1900
  - Expansion of civil governance and granting of U.S. citizenship under the Jones–Shafroth Act: March 2, 1917
  - Reversal of the name of the archipelgo and island to the original Puerto Rico: May 17, 1932
  - Athorization to elect governor under the Elective Governor Act: August 5, 1947
  - Authorization of constitutional self-governance under the Puerto Rico Federal Relations Act of 1950: July 3, 1950
  - Ratification of the Constitution of Puerto Rico by the U.S. Congress: July 3, 1952
  - Proclamation of the Constitution and start of the Commonwealth: July 25, 1952
- ISO 3166 code: PR
Preceded by	Succeeded by
Military Government of Porto Rico	Commonwealth of Puerto Rico

The Insular Government of Porto Rico (Spanish: Gobierno Insular de Puerto Rico), also known as the Insular Government of Puerto Rico, was an unincorporated and organized territory of the United States established in Puerto Rico under a civil government responsible for administering the archipelago and island by the authority of organic acts, namely the Foraker Act from 1900 to 1917 and the Jones–Shafroth Act from 1917 to 1952. Beginning with the end of the Military Government of Porto Rico under the Foraker Act on May 1, 1900 and ending with the start of the Commonwealth of Puerto Rico under the Constitution of Puerto Rico on July 25, 1952, it was headed by a governor appointed by the U.S. President from 1900 to 1948 and an elected governor from 1948 to 1952. The governor was under the direct purview of the Chief of Insular Affairs and Secretary of War from 1900 to 1934 and the Director of Insular Affairs and Secretary of the Interior from 1934 to 1952.

Succeeding the Military Government of Porto Rico, which administered the archipelago and island as an unincorporated and unorganized U.S. insular area after its acquisition during the Spanish-American War in 1898, the Insular Government of Porto Rico operated as an unincorporated and organized U.S. insular area since an organic act granting government powers to the territory was in existence, and the U.S. Constitution applied selectively in the territory, per the Insular Cases decided by the U.S. Supreme Court from 1901 to 1922.

From 1900 to 1917, it was authorized under the Foraker Act. The organic act established a civil government composed of a governor and an executive council appointed by the U.S. President, a House of Delegates with elected members, a judicial system with a Supreme Court, and a non-voting elected Resident Commissioner to the U.S. House of Representatives, the lower chamber of the U.S. Congress. It also established Puerto Rican citizenship and extended American nationality to Puerto Ricans. The Act granted some measure of self-government to Puerto Rico, but the preponderant control of the local government was retained by the U.S. federal government.

From 1917 to 1952, it was expanded under the authority of the Jones–Shafroth Act. The organic act functioned as a de facto constitution, establishing a bill of rights based on the U.S. Bill of Rights and granting statutory birthright U.S. citizenship to anyone born in the archipelago and island on or after April 11, 1899. It created the executive departments of Justice, Education, Finance, Interior, Labor and Agriculture, and Health, with their appointed heads forming an executive council to the governor, established a Senate with elected members, and increased the membership and term length of the House of Delegates, which was renamed as the House of Representatives. It also increased the term length of the Resident Commissioner. The Act provided an advance in local self-government for Puerto Rico.

The Jones–Shafroth Act was amended by the Elective Governor Act of 1947 or the Crawford-Butler Act to grant the residents of Puerto Rico the right to elect a governor and by the Puerto Rico Federal Relations Act of 1950 to grant Puerto Rico the right to constitutional autonomy within its borders. Created, ratified, and proclaimed in 1952, the Constitution of Puerto Rico provided full self-governance to the archipelago and island as an ongoing unincorporated and organized U.S. territory under the designation of commonwealth.

== Background ==
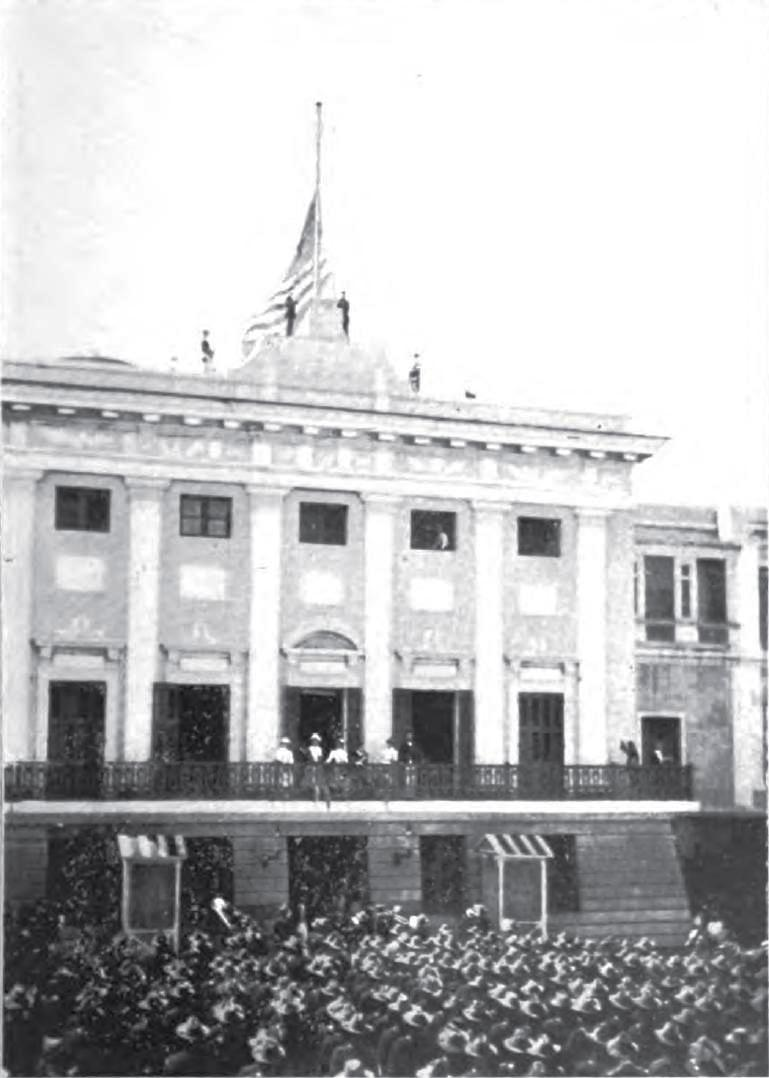
Raising the US Flag over San Juan, October 18, 1898.

After the ratification of the Treaty of Paris of 1898, Puerto Rico came under the colonial control of the United States of America. This brought about significant changes: the name of the island was changed to Porto Rico (it was changed back to Puerto Rico in 1932) and the currency was changed from the Puerto Rican peso to the United States dollar. Freedom of assembly, speech, press, and religion were decreed and an eight-hour day for government employees was established. A public school system was begun and the U.S. Postal service was extended to the island. The highway system was enlarged, and bridges over the more important rivers were constructed. The government lottery was abolished, cockfighting was forbidden (it was legalized again in 1933), and a centralized public health service established. Health conditions were poor at the time, with high rates of infant mortality and numerous endemic diseases.

The 45-star flag, used by the United States during the invasion of Puerto Rico, was also the official flag of Puerto Rico from 1899 to 1908.

The beginning of the military government also marked the creation of new political groups. The Partido Republicano, 'Republican Party' and the American Federal Party were created, led by José Celso Barbosa and Luis Muñoz Rivera, respectively. Both groups supported annexation by the United States as a solution to the colonial situation. The island's Creole sugar planters, who had suffered from declining prices, hoped that U.S. rule would help them gain access to the North American market.

Disaster struck in August 1899, when two hurricanes ravaged the island: the 1899 San Ciriaco hurricane on August 8, and an unnamed hurricane on August 22. Approximately 3,400 people died in the floods and thousands were left without shelter, food, or work. The effects on the economy were devastating: millions of dollars were lost due to the destruction of the majority of the sugar and coffee plantations. Afterwards, nearly 5000 Puerto Ricans migrated to Hawaii by 1910 to work in the sugar plantations of Hawaii.

== History ==
=== Foraker Act of 1900 ===
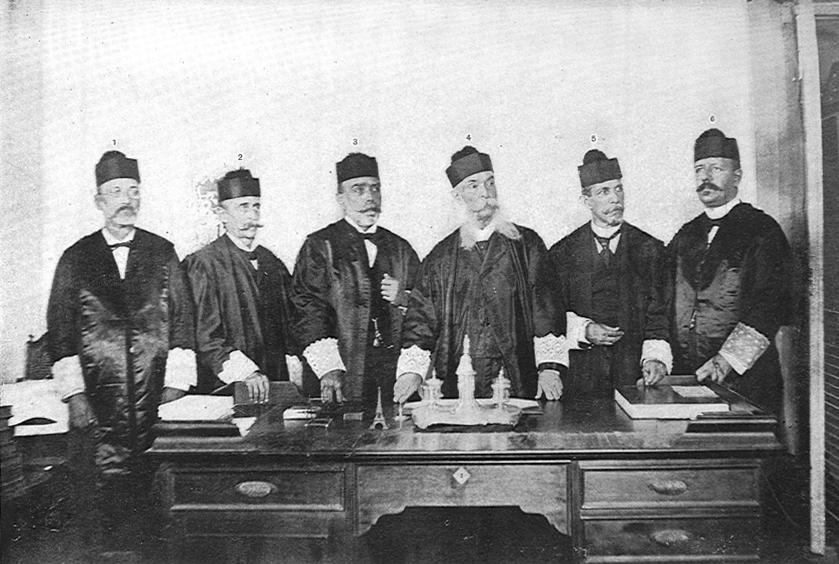
The first Supreme Court of Puerto Rico, established in 1900.

The military government in Puerto Rico was short lived; it was disbanded on April 2, 1900, when the U.S. Congress enacted the Foraker Act (also known as the Organic Act of 1900), sponsored by Senator Joseph B. Foraker. This act established a civil government and free commerce between the island and the United States. The structure of the insular government included a governor appointed by the President of the United States, an executive council (the equivalent of a senate), and a legislature with 35 members, though the executive veto required a two-thirds vote to override. The first appointed civil governor, Charles Herbert Allen, was inaugurated on May 1, 1900. On June 5, President William McKinley appointed an Executive Council which included five Puerto Rican members and six U.S. members. The act also established the creation of a judicial system headed by the Supreme Court of Puerto Rico and allowed Puerto Rico to send a Resident Commissioner as a representative to Congress. The Puerto Rico Department of Education was subsequently formed, headed by Martin Grove Brumbaugh (later governor of Pennsylvania). Teaching was conducted entirely in English with Spanish treated as a special subject. Both languages, however, were official on the island. On November 6, the first elections under the Foraker Act were held and on December 3, the first Legislative Assembly took office. On March 14, 1901, Federico Degetau took office as the first Resident Commissioner from Puerto Rico in Washington.

=== Immediate economic changes ===
The island's social and economic structure modernized after 1898, with new infrastructure such as roads, ports, railroads and telegraph lines, new public health measures, hospitals, and programs to develop agriculture. The high infant mortality death rate of the late 19th century declined steadily, thanks in large measure to basic public health programs.

Following the takeover of rich lands by the United States in 1899, Puerto Rico shifted towards a capitalist mode of production. The Hollander Act was enacted in 1901, leading to a 2% tax on rural property. The tax was reduced to 1% following widespread protests, but landowners were still forced to sell their land as a result.

Sugar mill owners between the period of 1898 and 1945 turned their sugar mills into monocultural plantations in response to the economy of the 20th century. The sugar mills and tobacco, cigar, and cigarette factories gained the United States' attention due to their fast productions and large amount of produce. Women and children were the primary workers within these industries. Puerto Rican trades went to the United States 95% of the time. By 1914, the coffee production that once was steady failed.

The sugar industry rose along with the economy. Puerto Rican mill owners and French and Spanish residents took the United States' corporate capital. Four United States operations were part of the United sugar refineries that were owned by Cuba and the Dominican Republic. In 1870, Congress made the tariff wall in order to protect domestic producers of sugar. Puerto Rico's sugar industry suffered as a result, but the acquisition of Puerto Rico by the United States brought free trade between the two. Capital flowed into Puerto Rico with the effect of modernizing its sugar processing mills due to the United States' influence.

Puerto Rico's agricultural economy was transformed into a sugar monoculture economy, supplemented by gardens for local consumption. American sugar companies had an advantage over the local sugar plantation owners, who could only finance their operations at local banks, which offered high interest rates compared to the low rates that American companies received from the commercial banks in Wall Street. This factor, plus the tariffs imposed, forced many of the local sugar plantation owners to go bankrupt or to sell their holdings to the more powerful sugar companies. Sugar was considered one of the few strategic commodities in which the United States was not fully self-sufficient. In 1950, Puerto Rico had a record sugar crop.

While the sugar industry suffered in the late 1800s, the coffee industry flourished. By the end of the 19th century, the island was the world's seventh largest producer of coffee. This changed after 1898, when export production replaced farming. People lost their land and properties, the amount of land disposal shrank, and the people hoped that Europe would take part in the trade of coffee, but they did not. Coffee makers were not happy with them being controlled by the United States. In 1933, most of the people worked as families instead of individuals most likely due to 90 percent of them being poor.

The United States had formed a Tobacco Trust that had basis rules for cigarettes, but Puerto Ricans had issues when it came to brand and local marketing. The Tobacco Trust controlled cigarettes and cigar production as well as the tobacco leaf. There was a fall of the industry due to the exports.

=== Social and educational changes ===
Cockfighting was originally banned following the American takeover. However, in 1933, cockfighting was legalized again and became a booming industry.

The American administrators put great emphasis on developing a modern school system. English-language instruction provoked fears of cultural genocide. This effort generated resistance from teachers, parents, politicians, intellectuals, and others. Resistance to the imposition of English was part of a larger effort to resist invasion and colonization. The schools became an arena for "cultural identity" as promoted by middle-class local teachers, who rejected the idea of creating students speaking only English, and instead sought to have a Puerto Rican culture that incorporated the best of modern pedagogy and learning with a tie for the island's Hispanic language and cultural traditions. U.S. officials underestimated the place of Spanish in Puerto Rican culture. By 1898 Spanish language was firmly rooted in the population. Spanish was also one of the leading international languages through which Puerto Ricans were in contact with the world. The level of opposition to the imposition of English was such that it led to the failure of U.S. language policies in Puerto Rico.

One shock came in 1935, however, when a New York study found Puerto Rican schoolchildren in New York City to be seriously deficient in basic skills. After 39 years of the imposition of English at the University of Puerto Rico, Spanish became the preferred language of instruction in 1942, and in public schools the vernacular Spanish became the language of teaching and learning in 1940–50.

=== Politics ===
An economically evolving Puerto Rico called for a new advancement in political status. Powerful, innovative Puerto Rican leaders, including Luis Muñoz Rivera, José de Diego, Rosendo Matienzo Cintrón, Manuel Zeno Gandía, Luis Lloréns Torres, Eugenio Benítez Castaño, and Pedro Franceschi, contributed to the rise of multiple successful political parties. However, the birth of multiple political groups led to a diversion of the island's interests: uniting as a statehood with the US, becoming a US territory/commonwealth, or declaring independence altogether. In 1900, the Partido Federal, 'Federal Party' was formed during the US military rule of the island after the Spanish–American War. It was formed by Luis Munoz Rivera and other members of the Autonomist Party. The Partido Federal favored immediate transformation of Puerto Rico into an organized unincorporated territory and eventually US statehood. The Partido Obrero Socialista de Puerto Rico, 'Socialist Labor Party of Puerto Rico' were founded by Santiago Iglesias Pantin. Over time the Partido Obrero Socialista de Puerto Rico was also in favor of statehood with the US. The Partido Federal campaigned for assimilation into the United States and wanted to develop prosperously with their best interests under the new US administration. They wanted to fully integrate US law and government. Their plan was to become a territory and have representation through a delegate and eventually become a US state with no restrictions. The Partido Obrero Socialista de Puerto Rico did not advocate for independence. Instead, party leader Santiago Iglesias Pantin advocated for statehood and change in economic policies which were influenced by his practice in founding the Federación Regional de Trabajadores (Regional Workers Federation) and labor newspaper Ensayo Obrero. The party was based on the principles of the Socialist Labor Party of America and received much support from American authorities. After the dissolution of the Federal Party, Luis Muñoz Rivera and José de Diego founded the Partido Unionista de Puerto Rico, 'Unionist Party of Puerto Rico' in 1904. The Unionist Party of Puerto Rico aimed to secure "the right of Puerto Rico to assert its own personality, either through statehood or independence." The beginning of the Partido Independentista, the independence party, was in 1909. Rosendo Matienzo Cintrón, Manuel Zeno Gandía, Luis Lloréns Torres, Eugenio Benítez Castaño, and Pedro Franceschi founded the party which was the first political party whose agenda was the independence of Puerto Rico. Another change occurred during the year the party was founded. The Olmsted Amendment changed the Foraker Act, which was designed to switch the Puerto Rican government from a military one to a government run by the civilians. Instead, the Olmsted Act called for the government to be managed solely under the executive branch.

The Puerto Rican status quo was again altered in 1909 when the Foraker Act, which replaced military rule with a civilian government in Puerto Rico, was modified by the Olmsted Amendment. This amendment placed the supervision of Puerto Rican affairs in the jurisdiction of an executive department designated by the president of the United States.^{[50]} In 1914, the first Puerto Rican officers, Martín Travieso (Secretary) and Manuel V. Domenech (Commissioner of Interiors), were assigned to the Executive Cabinet. This allowed for native Puerto Ricans to hold a majority in the Council, which consisted of five members selected by the president, for the first time in history. A 1915 delegation from Puerto Rico, accompanied by the Governor Arthur Yager, traveled to Washington, D.C. to ask Congress to grant the island more autonomy. Luis Muñoz Rivera became one of the founders of the Union Party in Puerto Rico who was against the Foraker Act. This delegation and speeches made by Resident Commissioner Muñoz Rivera in Congress, coupled with political and economic interests, led to the drafting of the Jones–Shafroth Act of 1917 (Jones Act).

=== Jones Act of 1917 ===
The Jones Act was made to replace the Foraker Act, which allowed for the free entry of Puerto Rican goods into the U.S. market. The Jones Act was approved by the U.S. Congress on December 5, 1916, and signed into law by President Woodrow Wilson on March 2, 1917. Although it extended citizenship to Puerto Ricans, it wasn't always welcomed. The Partido Union had opposed extension of U.S. citizenship in 1912 if it didn't make Puerto Rico a state. If they didn't become a state, U.S. citizenship would be interpreted as an attempt to block independence of the Puerto Ricans. For them, the promise of citizenship didn't affirm the promise of statehood; it excluded any considerations of independence.

The act made Puerto Rico an "organized but unincorporated" United States territory, much like a colony. Puerto Ricans were also collectively given a restricted U.S. citizenship. This implied that Puerto Ricans residing on the island did not have full American citizenship rights, such as the right to vote for the President of the United States. As U.S. citizens, conscription could be extended to the island. A few months later, 20,000 Puerto Rican soldiers were sent to the United States Army during the First World War. The Act also divided governmental powers into three branches: an executive (appointed by the President of the United States), legislative, and judicial branch. The legislative branch was composed of the Senate, consisting of nineteen members, and a House of Representatives, consisting of 39 members. Legislators were freely elected by the Puerto Rican people. A bill of rights, which established elections to be held every four years, was also created.

Though the act created a more structured government for the island, the United States Congress still held the right to veto or amend bills and laws passed by the territorial legislature. In addition to veto power, the United States could prevent the enforcing of actions taken by the legislature. The Act stated that the President of the United States was to appoint members of the Puerto Rico's legislative branch, as well as the directors of the six major government departments: Agriculture and Labor, Health, Interior, and Treasury (with the advice of Congress) and the Attorney General and the Commissioner of Education. The Act also made English the official language of the Puerto Rican courts, government, and the public education systems.

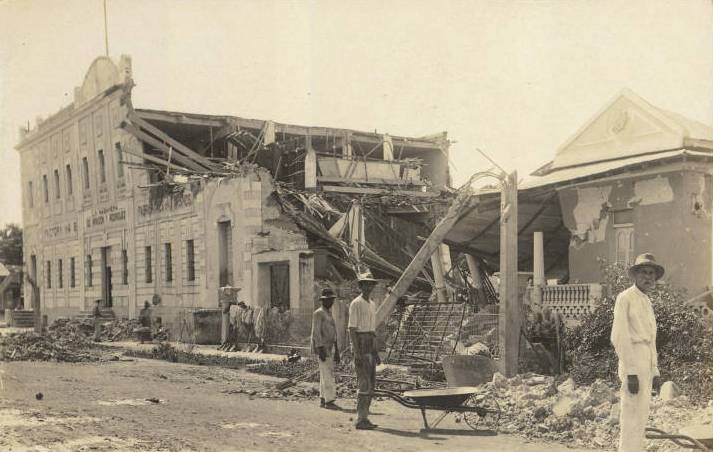
Aftermath in Mayaguez, of the 1918 earthquake.

On October 11, 1918, an earthquake occurred, with an approximate magnitude of 7.3 on the Richter scale, accompanied by a tsunami reaching 6.1 metres (20 ft) in height. The epicenter was located northwest of Aguadilla in the Mona Passage (between Puerto Rico and the Dominican Republic). This earthquake caused great damage and loss of life at Mayagüez, and lesser damage along the west coast. Tremors continued for several weeks. Approximately 116 casualties were reported resulting from the earthquake and 40 from the tsunami.

Some politicians were in favor of Puerto Rico becoming an incorporated state of the U.S., while others wanted Puerto Rico to gain independence from the United States. Amid this debate, a nationalist group emerged that encouraged radical activism for Puerto Rico to become independent from the United States. As a consequence of the Jones Act and the establishment of elections, a new political party, the Partido Nacionalista de Puerto Rico, 'Puerto Rican Nationalist Party', was founded on September 17, 1922. This party used advocated massive demonstrations and protests against any political activity that was not going to result in Puerto Rico gaining independence. In 1924, Pedro Albizu Campos joined the party and later became the vice president in 1927. In 1930, Albizu was elected president, and instilled many of his political ideologies into the party, which were composed heavily of anticolonial politics and feelings of contempt against the United States. In the 1930s, the Nationalist Party, led by president Pedro Albizu Campos, failed to attract sufficient electoral support and withdrew from political participation. Increased conflict arose between their adherents and the authorities. On October 20, 1935, Albizu testified against the dean of the University of Puerto Rico, claiming that he wanted to Americanize the institution. Four days later a student assembly gathered and declared Albizu a persona non grata, forbidding him to speak there. Albizu was later arrested for breaking the Smith Act of 1940, which declared that it was against the law for anyone to teach or be part of a group that encouraged the overthrow of the American government.

On October 23, 1935, a student assembly was planned to be held at the University of Puerto Rico-Río Piedras campus. Its officials asked Governor Blanton Winship to provide armed police officers for the campus to forestall possible violence. Colonel Elisha Francis Riggs, the U.S.-appointed Police Chief, commanded the forces. Several police officers spotted what they believed to be a suspicious-looking automobile and asked the driver Ramón S. Pagán for his license. Pagán was the Secretary of the Nationalist Party at this time. He was accompanied in the car by his friends and other Nationalist Party members Pedro Quiñones and Eduardo Rodríguez. The police officers asked Pagán to slowly drive to the police station on Calle Arzuaga, but while they were just a block away from the station, the police surrounded the vehicle and fired their guns into the car. Pagán, Quiñones, and Rodríguez were not armed with weapons. José Santiago Barea, another Nationalist, was approaching the car when police began shooting. It resulted in the death of the four nationalists and one bystander.

In retaliation for the "Río Piedras massacre" at the University of Rio Piedras, on February 23, 1936, Nationalists Hiram Rosado and Elias Beauchamp killed Colonel E. Francis Riggs in San Juan. They were taken into custody where they were killed by policemen and officers while being held at the San Juan headquarters. Rosado and Beauchamp were declared heroes by the Nationalist Party president, Pedro Albizu-Campos. Shortly after, the San Juan Federal Court had Albizu arrested for his incitement of discontent. After initially being found innocent in a jury with seven Puerto Ricans and two North Americans, the judge ordered a new jury which had ten North Americans and two Puerto Ricans, who found him guilty. On July 31, 1936, Albizu and several other Nationalists such as Juan Antonio Corretjer and Clemente Soto Vélez were convicted of being associated with Riggs' murder. They were sentenced to six to 10 years in a federal prison in the United States.

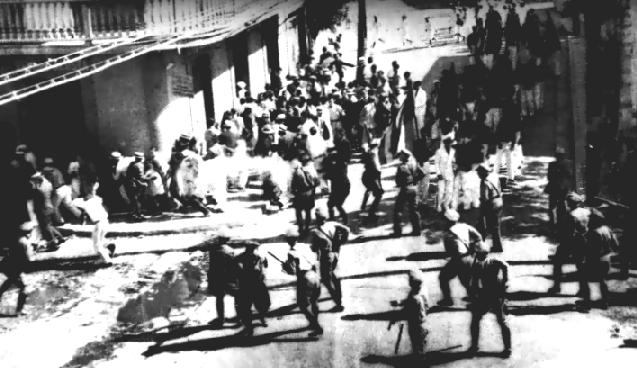
Picture by journalist Carlos Torres Morales of the Ponce massacre, March 21, 1937.

External audio
- You may watch newsreel scenes of the Ponce massacre here.

On March 21, 1937, a peaceful march was organized by the Nationalist Party, under Pedro Alibizu Campos, to commemorate the ending of slavery in Puerto Rico in 1873 by the governing Spanish National Assembly. The police, under the orders of General Blanton Winship, the US-appointed colonial Governor of Puerto Rico, opened fire at the peaceful Puerto Rican Nationalist Party parade, which is now known as the "Ponce massacre": 20 unarmed people (including two policemen) were killed, with wounded persons ranging between 100 and 200. This occurred because the head of the police force in Juana Díaz, Guillermo Soldevila, raised a whip and struck the chest of Tomás Lopez de Victoria, the captain of the cadet corps, and told him to stop the march. As a result, a police officer, Armando Martinez, ran from the corner in front of the Nationalist council and fired once into the air. This prompted many others to fire their arms.

On July 25, 1938, just over a year after the Ponce massacre, Governor Winship ordered a military parade to take place in the city of Ponce in celebration of the American invasion of Puerto Rico. Such celebrations customarily took place in San Juan, the capital of the colonial government. At the parade, an attempt was made to assassinate Winship, allegedly by members of the Nationalist Party. It was the first time in Puerto Rico's long history that an attempt had been made against a governor. Although Winship escaped unscathed, a total of 36 people were wounded, including a colonel in the National Guard and the Nationalist gunman.

=== Pre-WWII economy ===
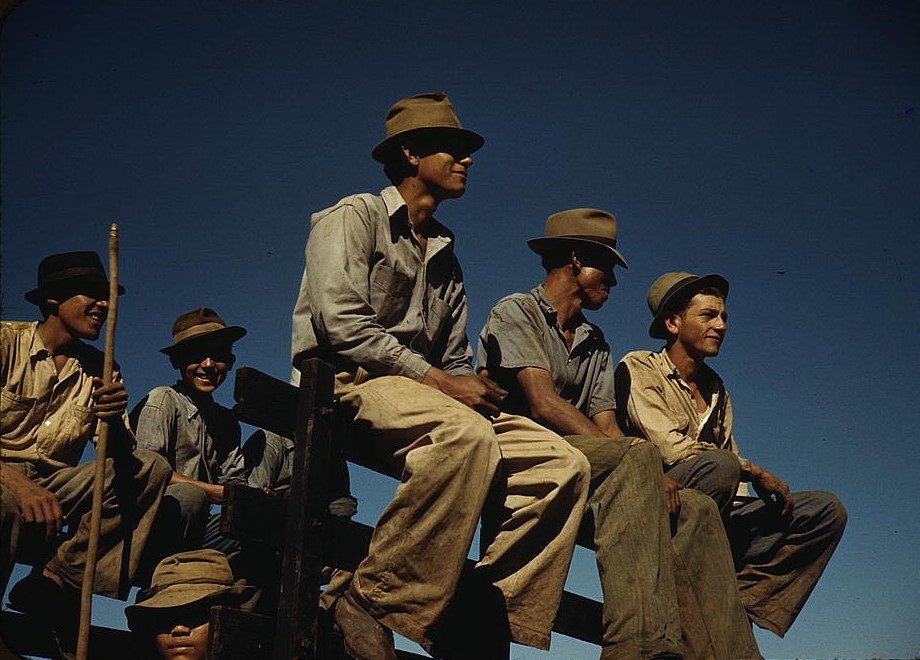
Sugar cane workers resting at the noon hour, Rio Piedras. Photograph by Jack Delano, a photographer for the Farm Security Administration. Ca. 1941.

Coffee was a major industry before the 1940s. Arabica beans were introduced to the island in 1736. Production soared in the central mountainous area after 1855 because of cheap land, a low-paid and plentiful workforce, good credit facilities, and a growing market in the U.S., Spain and Europe. Decline set in after 1897, and the end came with a major hurricane in 1928 and the 1930s depression. While coffee declined, sugar and tobacco grew in importance, thanks to the large mainland market.

Land tenure did not become concentrated in fewer hands, but income increased as American agribusiness and capital investments arrived. The land tenure system was in the firm control of local farmers (small, medium, and large). After 1940 dairying became an industry second only to sugar, and had a higher dollar output than the better-known traditional crops – coffee and tobacco.

In the 1920s, the economy of Puerto Rico boomed. A dramatic increase in the price of sugar, Puerto Rico's principal export, brought cash to the farmers. As a result, the island's infrastructure was steadily upgraded. New schools, roads and bridges were constructed. The increase in private wealth was reflected in the erection of many residences, while the development of commerce and agriculture stimulated the extension of banking and transport facilities.

This period of prosperity came to an end in 1929 with the onset of the Great Depression. At the time, agriculture was the main contributor to the economy. Industry and commerce slowed during the 1930s as well. The problems were aggravated when on September 27, 1932, Hurricane San Ciprián struck the island. Exact figures of the destruction are not known but estimates say that 200–300 people were killed, more than a thousand were injured, and property damage escalated to $30–50 million ($710 million to $1.18 billion as of 2025).

The agricultural production, the principal economic driver for the island, came to a standstill. Under President Franklin D. Roosevelt's New Deal, a Puerto Rican Reconstruction Administration was authorized. Funds were made available for construction of new housing, infrastructure, including transportation improvements and other capital investment to improve island conditions. In 1938, a new federal minimum wage law was passed, establishing it at 25 cents an hour. As a consequence, two-thirds of the island's textile factories closed because they could not be profitable while paying workers at that level.

=== Direct elections ===
In the years after World War II, social, political and economical changes began to take place that have continued to shape the island's character today. 1943 saw the Legislative Assembly pass by unanimous vote a concurrent resolution calling for an end to the colonial system of government. The late 1940s brought the beginning of a major migration to the continental United States, mainly to New York City. The main reasons for this were an undesirable economic situation brought by the Great Depression, as well as strong recruiting by the U.S. armed forces for personnel and U.S. companies for workers.

In 1946 President Truman appointed Resident Commissioner Jesús T. Piñero to serve as island governor; he was the first Puerto Rican appointed to that position. In May 1948, a bill was introduced before the Puerto Rican Senate which would restrain the rights of the independence and nationalist movements on the archipelago. The Senate, which at the time was controlled by the Partido Popular Democrático, 'PPD' and presided by Luis Muñoz Marín, approved the bill. This bill became known as the Ley de la Mordaza (Gag Law, technically "Law 53 of 1948") when Piñero, signed it into law on June 10, 1948. It made it illegal to sing a patriotic song, and reinforced the 1898 law that had made it illegal to display the Flag of Puerto Rico, with anyone found guilty of disobeying the law in any way being subject to a sentence of up to ten years imprisonment, a fine of up to US$10,000 (equivalent to $134,000 in 2025), or both.

The U.S. Congress passed an act allowing Puerto Ricans to elect their governor, and the first elections under this act were held on November 2, 1948. Muñoz Marín won the election, and was sworn in as the first democratically elected Governor of Puerto Rico on January 2, 1949.

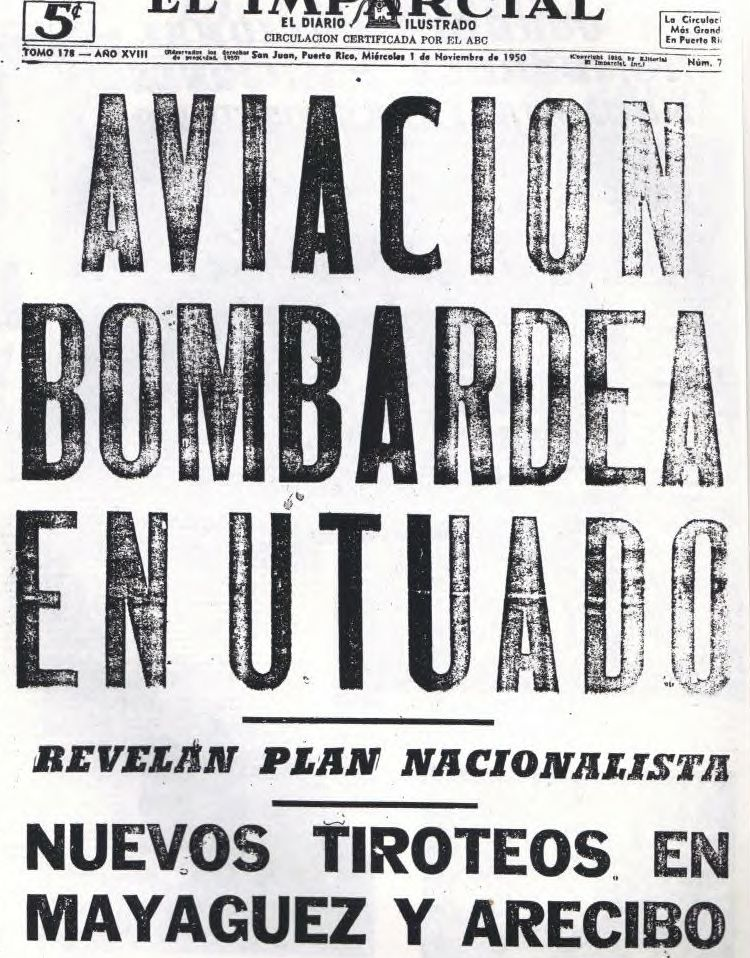
El Imparcial headline: "Aviation (US) bombs Utuado" during Nationalist revolts.

On July 3, 1950, President Harry S. Truman signed the Puerto Rico Federal Relations Act of 1950, which allowed Puerto Ricans to draft their own constitution to establish their own internal government — while the island was still under a gag law. It also authorized the President to forward the new constitution to the Congress, if he found it conformed to the provisions of the Act. The Constitution, which took effect upon approval by the U.S. Congress, formally named the territory "Estado Libre Asociado de Puerto Rico" in Spanish, but since the English translation "Free Associated State of Puerto Rico" was unacceptable, as the U.S. had not granted then statehood, the name "Commonwealth of Puerto Rico" is used in English. Four U.S. states – Kentucky, Massachusetts, Pennsylvania, and Virginia – use "commonwealth" as part of their formal names; and the former Territory of the Philippines was elevated to Commonwealth Status in 1935 in preparation for independence, which was granted in 1946. Once in office, however, Muñoz Marin was directed to not pursue Puerto Rican Independence, which angered many of his constituents, and betrayed the wishes of his father, Luis Muñoz Rivera, and dealt another blow to the independence movement.

On October 30, 1950, a group of Puerto Rican nationalists, under the leadership of Pedro Albizu Campos, staged several attacks across the main island, known as the Puerto Rican Nationalist Party revolts of the 1950s, the most successful of which is known as the Jayuya Uprising. The revolts included an attack on the governor's mansion, La Fortaleza. Puerto Rican military forces were called in to put down the Jayuya Uprising. Two days later, two Nationalists from New York tried to storm in to Blair House in Washington D.C., then the president's temporary residence, to assassinate United States President Harry S. Truman. These acts led Muñoz to crack down on Puerto Rican nationalists and advocates of Puerto Rican independence. The actions by both Muñoz, under the Gag Law and the "Carpetas program", and the United States Government, through the "COINTELPRO program", would later be determined as infringing on constitutional rights.

=== Establishment of the Commonwealth ===
From 1948 to 1952 it was a felony to display the Puerto Rican flag in public; the only flag permitted to be flown on the island was the flag of the United States.

In February 1952, the Constitution of Puerto Rico was approved by voters in a referendum, and the US Congress gave its approval, subject Puerto Rico striking Sec. 20 of Article II and adding text to Sec. 3 of Article VII of the final draft, amendments that were finally ratified in November of that year. The territory organized under the name Estado Libre Asociado de Puerto Rico – adjusted, in English, to "Commonwealth of Puerto Rico", as the archipelago was not a full state (Estado). That same year marked the first time that the Flag of Puerto Rico could be publicly displayed, rather than being subject to the 10-year prison sentence that had been passed in the Gag Law of 1948.

In the March 1954 United States Capitol shooting, four Puerto Rican Nationalists fired guns from the visitors gallery in the US House of Representatives at the Capitol, to protest the lack of Puerto Rican independence, wounding several persons. The nationalists, identified as Lolita Lebrón, Rafael Cancel Miranda, Andres Figueroa Cordero, and Irvin Flores Rodríguez, unfurled a Puerto Rican flag and began shooting at Representatives in the 83rd Congress, who were debating an immigration bill. Five Representatives were wounded, one seriously, but all recovered. The assailants were arrested, tried successively in two federal courts and convicted. All received long consecutive sentences, amounting to life imprisonment. In 1978 and 1979, their sentences were commuted by President Jimmy Carter. All four returned to Puerto Rico.

== See also ==
- Insular Government of the Philippine Islands
- Naval Government of Guam
