= José J. Benítez Díaz =

Puerto Rico politician

Member of the Puerto Rico Senate from the Humacao district
- In office 1917–1924

Personal details
- Born: November 24, 1865 Luquillo, Captaincy General of Puerto Rico
- Died: August 25, 1947 (aged 81) San Juan, Puerto Rico
- Party: Union of Puerto Rico
- Profession: Politician, Entrepreneur

José Juan Benítez Díaz (c. November 24, 1865– August 25, 1947) was a Puerto Rican businessman, entrepreneur and Unionista politician. He served as a member of the Senate of Puerto Rico from 1917 to 1924.

In 1917, Benítez Díaz was elected to the first Senate of Puerto Rico for the Union of Puerto Rico party, representing the District of Humacao. He served in that position until 1924.

During his time in the Senate, he chaired the Senate Appointments Committee and was the second highest-ranking legislator in the Finance Committees; and Trade and Agriculture.

After that, Benítez was the owner of Benítez Sugar Company in Vieques.

José J. Benítez Díaz died on August 25, 1947, at age 81. He was buried at Cementerio San José in San Juan, Puerto Rico.
