= Juan Angel Tió Malaret =

Puerto Rican politician

Member of the Puerto Rico Senate from the Mayagüez district
- In office 1917–1920

Mayor of San Germán, Puerto Rico
- In office 1933-1935
- Preceded by: Santiago Palmer
- Succeeded by: Edgardo Quiñonez
- In office 1925
- Preceded by: Genaro Nazario
- Succeeded by: Francisco Severa Silva

Personal details
- Born: February 26, 1874 San Germán, Puerto Rico
- Died: August 12, 1965 (aged 91) San Germán, Puerto Rico
- Party: Republican Party (Puerto Rico)
- Spouse: María Teresa Laura Nazario de Figueroa y Rodríguez de Astudillo
- Profession: Politician, Entrepreneur, Writer

Juan Angel Tió Malaret (1874—1965) was a Puerto Rican politician, businessman, entrepreneur and writer. He served as a member of the Senate of Puerto Rico from 1917 to 1920.

== Biography ==
Juan Angel Tió Malaret was born February 26, 1874, in San Germán, Puerto Rico, to Salvador Tió Urgell and Angela Malaret Anglada, both from Girona, Catalonia, in Spain.

Tió Malaret was director of Caja de Ahorros, a small bank in Puerto Rico, until 1909. He then founded Caja Popular de Ahorros y Préstamos, incorporating it in 1917 as Banco de San Germán. He presided the institution until 1965. Tió was also owner of sugar mills Igualdad (in Añasco) and Playa Grande (in Vieques) until their expropriation at the start of World War II.

In 1917, Tió Malaret was elected to the first Senate of Puerto Rico for the Republican Party, representing the District of Mayagüez. He served in that position until 1920. During that four-year term, he chaired the Commission on the Police and Civil Service.

In 1925, he served as mayor of San Germán for several months. He was elected to the Senate again in 1928, this time as a member of the Alianza Puertorriqueña party, and served until 1932. At the 1932 elections, he was elected as mayor of San Germán again, serving until 1935.

Angel Tió was also a writer and a poet. Some of his writings are featured in the book Horas Disipadas. He also wrote the book Esencias del Folklore Puertorriqueño, which was edited in 1967 by the San Germán Cultural Center.

Angel Tió was married to María Teresa Laura Nazario de Figueroa y Rodríguez de Astudillo. He died on August 12, 1965. He was buried at Antiguo Cementerio Municipal in San Germán, Puerto Rico.
