= Juan García Ducós =

Puerto Rican politician and senator

Member of the Puerto Rico Senate from the Aguadilla district
- In office 1917–1928

Personal details
- Born: July 6, 1883 Aguadilla, Puerto Rico
- Died: November 3, 1943 (aged 60) Aguadilla, Puerto Rico
- Party: Union of Puerto Rico; Alianza Puertorriqueña
- Profession: Politician

Juan García Ducós was a Puerto Rican politician and senator.

García Ducós was a member of the Puerto Rico House of Delegates during the early 1900s.

In 1917, García Ducós was elected as a member of the first Puerto Rican Senate established by the Jones-Shafroth Act. He represented the District III (Aguadilla).

García Ducós was reelected at the 1920 general elections. After that, like most of his fellow party members, he joined Alianza Puertorriqueña, a joint political venture with the Republican Party. He was again reelected at the 1924 general elections.

García Ducós was strongly against the death penalty, and tried several times to abolish it during his terms.

There's a housing project in Aguadilla that has his name.
