= Félix Santoni =

Puerto Rican politician

Felix Santoni

Member of the Puerto Rico Senate from the Arecibo district
- In office 1917–1920

Personal details
- Born: March 10, 1871 Yauco, Puerto Rico
- Died: December 15, 1959 (aged 88) San Juan, Puerto Rico
- Party: Union of Puerto Rico
- Education: Complutense University of Madrid (JD)
- Profession: Politician

Felix Antonio Santoni Rodriguez was a Puerto Rican Lawyer, politician and senator.

In 1917, Santoni was elected as a member of the first Puerto Rican Senate established by the Jones-Shafroth Act. He represented the Puerto Rico Senatorial district III (Arecibo).

He earned a Law degree from the Complutense University of Madrid in 1894, graduating with the highest honors. At the age of 22, he joined the practice of his profession with one of the most notable figures in public life, the great statesman and jurist Rafael María de Labra.

He later served as a judge in Utuado and as a prosecutor in Arecibo.

In 1919, Santoni opposed voted against a bill to allow women voting. He claimed that "the time was not right for that reform".

He died on November 12, 1959, in San Juan, Puerto Rico at the age of 88.
