= José de Jesús Tizol =

American politician (1878–1929)

Member of the Puerto Rico Senate from the San Juan district
- In office 1917–1920

Member of the Puerto Rico House of Representatives from the 1st district
- In office 1920 – 1929 (died in office)

Personal details
- Born: May 20, 1878 San Juan, Puerto Rico
- Died: April 7, 1929 (aged 50) San Juan, Puerto Rico
- Party: Union of Puerto Rico
- Profession: Politician

José de Jesús Tizol González was a Puerto Rican politician, senator and delegate.

De Jesús Tizol was one of the many founders of the Ateneo Puertorriqueño.

During the early 1900s, de Jesús was a member of the Puerto Rico House of Delegates for various terms.

In 1917, de Jesús was elected as a member of the first Puerto Rican Senate established by the Jones-Shafroth Act. He represented the District I (San Juan).

In the four-year period from 1921 to 1924 in the Senate, Tizol presided over the Criminal Law Commission and was the second highest-ranking representative in the Finance commissions and Labor. He was also a member of the Finance Commission.

He died in San Juan, Puerto Rico while holding a seat in the House of Representatives on April 7, 1929 at the age of 50. He is buried at Santa María Magdalena de Pazzis Cemetery in San Juan, Puerto Rico.
