= Puerto Rico Federal Relations Act of 1950 =

US law enabling a local government in the territory

- Long title: An act to provide for the organization of a constitutional government by the people of Puerto Rico.
- Enacted by: the 81st United States Congress

Citations
- Public law: 81-600

Codification
- Acts amended: Jones–Shafroth Act

Legislative history
- Signed into law by President Harry S. Truman on July 3, 1950

The Puerto Rico Federal Relations Act of 1950 (Pub. L. 81–600) was an act of the 81st United States Congress, which passed unanimously in the United States Senate and with one dissenting vote, from pro-independence Vito Marcantonio, in the United States House of Representatives. Signed into law on July 3, 1950 by President Harry Truman, the act enabled the residents of Puerto Rico to organize the insular government of the unincorporated territory under a constitution of its own, comparable to those of states of the United States. Established under the act and its Pub. L. 82–447 joint resolution in 1952, the Constitution of Puerto Rico superseded the Jones–Shafroth Act of 1917 as the primary organic law for the local government of Puerto Rico and its relation with the United States.

With the approval of the Puerto Rico Federal Relations Act of 1950, the full authority and responsibility for the local government of Puerto Rico was vested in the residents of Puerto Rico, resulting in complete self-governance within the archipelago and island.

== Effects ==
The U.S. Congress submitted the act for rejection or approval by the people of Puerto Rico in a referendum held in 1951. As enacted by the act, such approval automatically authorized the Legislative Assembly of Puerto Rico to call for a constitutional convention in order to draft a constitution for Puerto Rico. Once assembled, this convention prepared a draft for a new constitution that was ultimately approved in a constitutional referendum held on March 3, 1952. This constitution was subsequently ratified by the 82nd U.S. Congress with some amendments. The amended constitution was officially proclaimed on July 25, 1952, immediately going into effect until present.

The Puerto Rico Federal Relations Act automatically continued in force and effect the Jones–Shafroth Act of 1917, while repealing some of its provisions. The act, along with its Pub. L. 82–447 joint resolution, established the Constitution of Puerto Rico, which forms the basis for the local government of the archipelago and island and its relation with the U.S. today.
