= Leopoldo Felíz Severa =

American politician

Leopoldo Feliz Severa

Member of the Puerto Rico Senate from the Mayagüez district
- In office 1917–1920

Personal details
- Born: November 15, 1883 San Germán, Puerto Rico
- Died: June 30, 1941 (aged 57) San Juan, Puerto Rico
- Party: Republican Party
- Education: Albany Law School (JD)
- Profession: Lawyer, Politician

Leopoldo Feliz Severa was a Puerto Rican politician and senator.

In 1917, Feliz Severa was elected as a member of the first Puerto Rican Senate established by the Jones-Shafroth Act. He represented District IV (Mayagüez).
