= Feliz Deserto =

Municipality in Alagoas, Brazil

- Municipality of Alagoas, Brazil
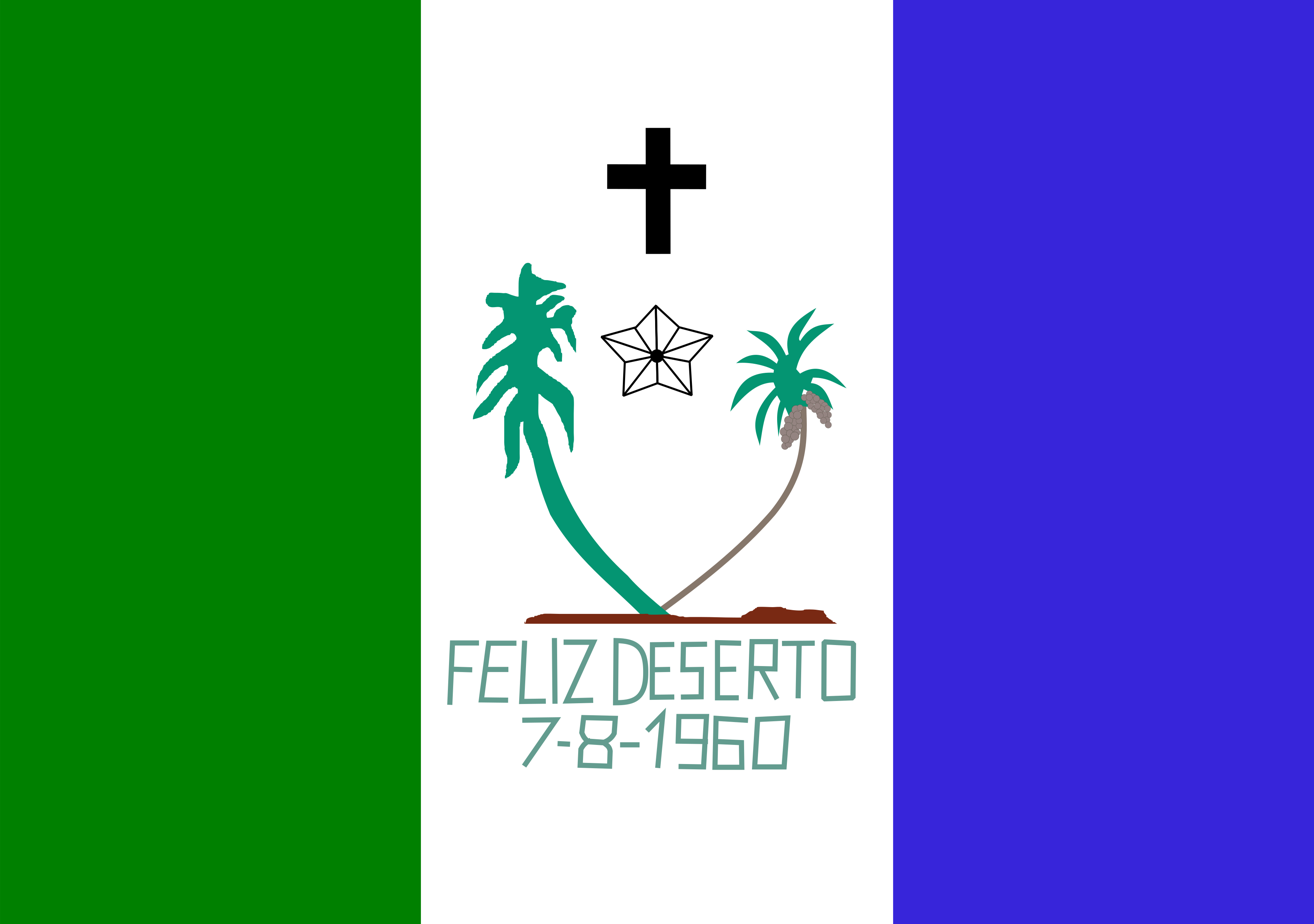
- Flag

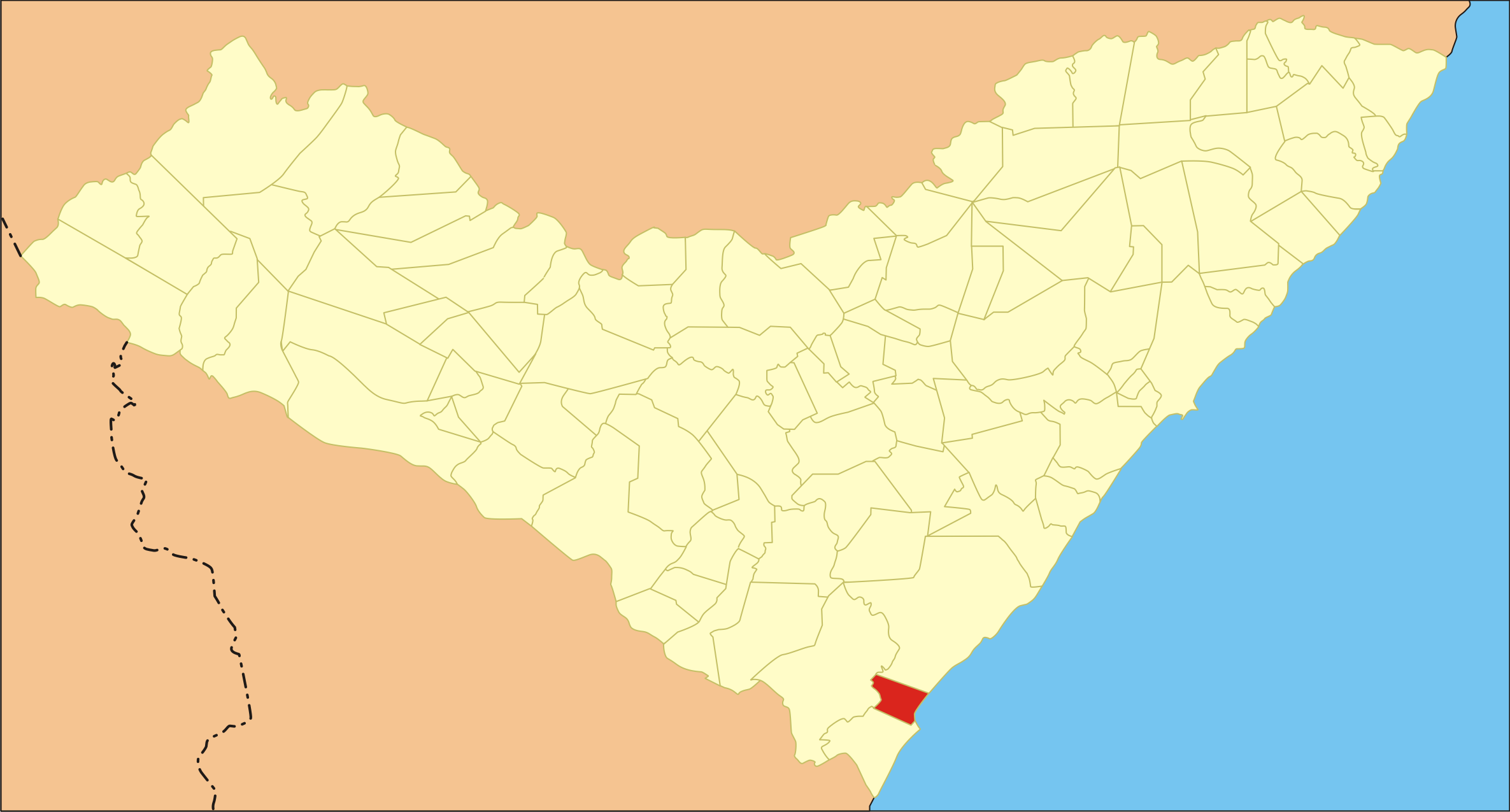
- Location of Feliz Deserto in Alagoas

- Location within Brazil Location within South America
- Coordinates: 10°17′31″S 36°18′21″W
- Country: Brazil
- Region: Northeast
- State: Alagoas
- Founded: 23 July 1960

Government
  - Mayor: Jorge Luis Silva Nunes (PP) (2025-2028)
  - Vice Mayor: Joao Paulo dos Santos Souza (MDB) (2025-2028)

Area
  - Total: 110.062 km^{2} (42.495 sq mi)
- Elevation: 16 m (52 ft)

Population (2022)
  - Total: 3,963
  - Density: 36.01/km^{2} (93.3/sq mi)
- Demonym: Feliz-desertense (Brazilian Portuguese)
- Time zone: UTC-03:00 (Brasília Time)
- Postal code: 57220-000
- HDI (2010): 0.565 – medium
- Website: felizdeserto.al.gov.br

Feliz Deserto (Central northeastern portuguese pronunciation: [fiˈlijs dɛˈzɛɦtu]) is a municipality located in the south of the Brazilian state of Alagoas. Its population is 4,779 (2020) and its area is 92 km^{2} (36 sq mi).

== See also ==
- List of municipalities in Alagoas
