= Aero Feliz =

Mexican charter airline

IATA	ICAO	Call sign
XA	HDQ	AERO FELIZ
- Founded: 1990; 36 years ago (as Aero Amigo)
- Commenced operations: August 1, 1990; 35 years ago (as Aero Feliz)
- Ceased operations: September 1, 1992; 33 years ago (fleet acquired by Aero Continente)
- Operating bases: Licenciado Gustavo Díaz Ordaz International Airport
- Fleet size: 1

Aero Feliz (English: Happy Air) was a passenger airline that operated in the Mexican Republic from 1990 until 1992. It is notable for being one of the first charter, low-cost airlines in Mexico.

== Destinations ==
The airline flew from their base at Puerto Vallarta to domestic destinations within Mexico, such as Mexico City, Guadalajara, and international destinations including Dallas-Fort Worth and Miami.

== Fleet ==
Aero Feliz fleet
Aircraft	Total	Orders	Passengers	Notes
Boeing 737-200	1	0	130	
