= Alto Feliz =

Municipality of Rio Grande do Sul, Brazil

- Municipality
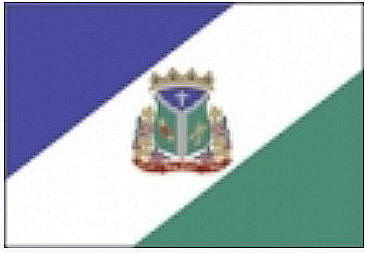
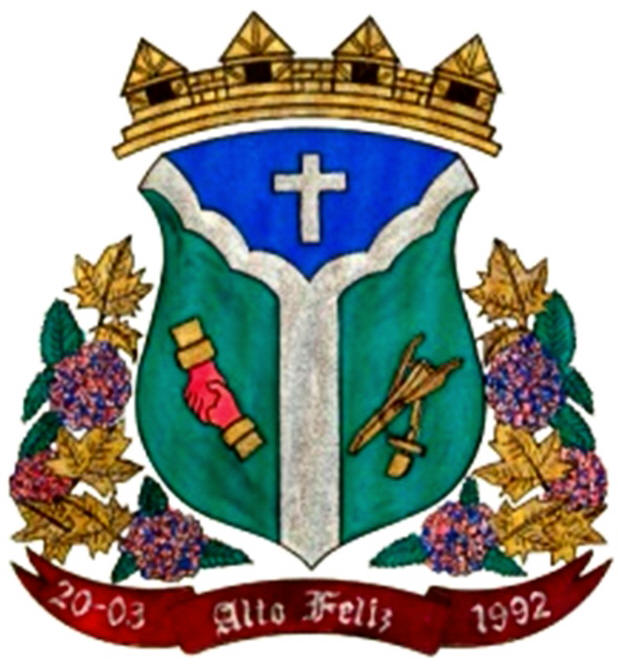
- Flag Coat of arms

- Coordinates: 29°23′S 51°18′W
- Country: Brazil
- State: Rio Grande do Sul
- Founded: March 20, 1992

Government
  - Mayor: Paulo Mertins

Area
  - Total: 79.204 km^{2} (30.581 sq mi)
- Elevation: 285 m (935 ft)

Population (2020)
  - Total: 3,036
  - Density: 38.33/km^{2} (99.28/sq mi)

Alto Feliz is a municipality within the state of Rio Grande do Sul, Brazil. It was raised to municipality status in 1992, the area being taken out of the municipality of Feliz.

== See also ==
- List of municipalities in Rio Grande do Sul
