= Statutory citizenship =

Type granted by legislation

Statutory citizenship is a form of citizenship where the people or groups of people receiving citizenship are given access to citizenship by a legislative body of the nation. The use of restrictions and stipulations is a way of differentiating statutory citizenship from constitutional citizenship. The United States Supreme Court in Rogers v. Bellei (1971) held that statutory citizens do not have a constitutional right to U.S. citizenship; it is granted by Congress and can be revoked through an act of Congress.

== First use ==
This term was first used in 1917 under the Jones–Shafroth Act by members of the 64th United States Congress. This terminology was introduced to differentiate this citizenship from constitutionally-protected citizenship, thereby limiting the levels of protection offered by the United States government.

== U.S. citizens born abroad ==
Children born abroad to U.S. citizens derive U.S. citizenship not from the Fourteenth Amendment but from federal statute. Under the Immigration and Nationality Act (INA) § 301(c)–(g) [8 U.S.C. § 1401], certain persons born outside the United States are U.S. citizens at birth if their parents meet specified residency and citizenship requirements. This form of citizenship is often referred to as statutory citizenship, since it is conferred by Congress rather than by the Constitution's Citizenship Clause.

== Native Americans ==
In 1924, statutory citizenship was granted to all Native Americans born in the United States. Prior to the Indian Citizenship Act, the Supreme Court ruled that those born to the tribes were subjects of an Indian nation within the sovereign jurisdiction of an Indian reservation and not entitled to citizenship under the Fourteenth Amendment (see Elk v. Wilkins).

== Birth in unincorporated territories ==
Those born in overseas territories of the United States with permanent inhabitants, except American Samoa, have been granted statutory citizenship. This includes those born in Guam, the Virgin Islands, and Puerto Rico.

=== Effects on Puerto Rico ===
The U.S. Supreme Court has the discretionary power to decide the extent to which Puerto Ricans will have their fundamental personal rights protected and defined on a case-by-case basis. Since the United States Constitution does not fully apply to Puerto Ricans and the territory retains its own constitution, it is unclear whether in what contexts the U.S. Supreme Court can offer any legal protections to those living on the island.

In the context of Puerto Rico, statutory citizenship allows many of the privileges afforded to American citizens with a few notable restrictions and stipulations. One of the most notable of the restrictions relates to the manner through which citizenship can be legally revoked. Citizenship has been revoked pursuant to understandings of the Territory Clause of the United States Constitution which would place Puerto Rico as a place which is not within the physical bounds of the United States. It is instead an unincorporated territory which lies outside of the boundaries created by the 50 states of America.

One heavily debated aspect of the Territory Clause relates to the process of incorporation into the United States. This process could allow naturalized citizens to move beyond the boundaries of statutory citizenship and have constitutional citizenship, which is protected from revocation through the 14th Amendment. More specifically, the Supreme Court ruled in 1922 in Balzac v. Porto Rico that while the Jones Act may have extended American citizenship to Puerto Ricans, it did not establish a showing of incorporation of the island into the United States. This will be brought up multiple times in Congressional debates and discussions on the citizenship status of Puerto Rico through to the present. This argument uses the lack of incorporation of Puerto Rico into the United States to ensure that Puerto Rico does not classify under the same legal status of the preexistent 50 states.

That said, some Puerto Ricans were and continue to be eligible for Fourteenth Amendment Citizenship. Those who were born in any of the 50 states would be granted constitutional citizenship, as opposed to those born on the island who were subsequently ineligible. The physical location of Puerto Rico, as determined by the Territory Clause, creates a space that is legally different from the 50 states. It is an unincorporated possession which is neither in the United States nor a foreign entity. When legislators establish that Puerto Rico exists in this intermediary physical location, a new type of citizenship, in this case, statutory citizenship, arises to create the label for how people born in this intermediary physical location can access citizenship.

In 2011, the President's Task Force on Puerto Rico issued a report providing a list of viable options for either retaining or changing the current territorial status of Puerto Rico. Any change in Puerto Rico's status would require action on behalf of the acting Congressional members, and as of the writing of their report, none has been taken.
