= Feliz Navidad =

Feliz Navidad is a phrase meaning "Happy Christmas" or "Merry Christmas" in Spanish.

It may also refer to:

== Music ==
- Feliz Navidad (José Feliciano album), 1970
- Feliz Navidad (Héctor Lavoe album), 1979
- Feliz Navidad (Menudo album), 1982
- "Feliz Navidad" (song), a 1970 song by José Feliciano
- "Feliz Navidad", a 1997 Christmas song by Irán Castillo
- Feliz Navidad, a 2018 album by Rolando Villazón

== Film ==
- Feliz Navidad, a 2006 Christmas film starring Giselle Blondet
- Feliz NaviDad, a 2020 Christmas film starring Mario Lopez
