= Feliz =

Municipality of Rio Grande do Sul, Brazil

- Municipality
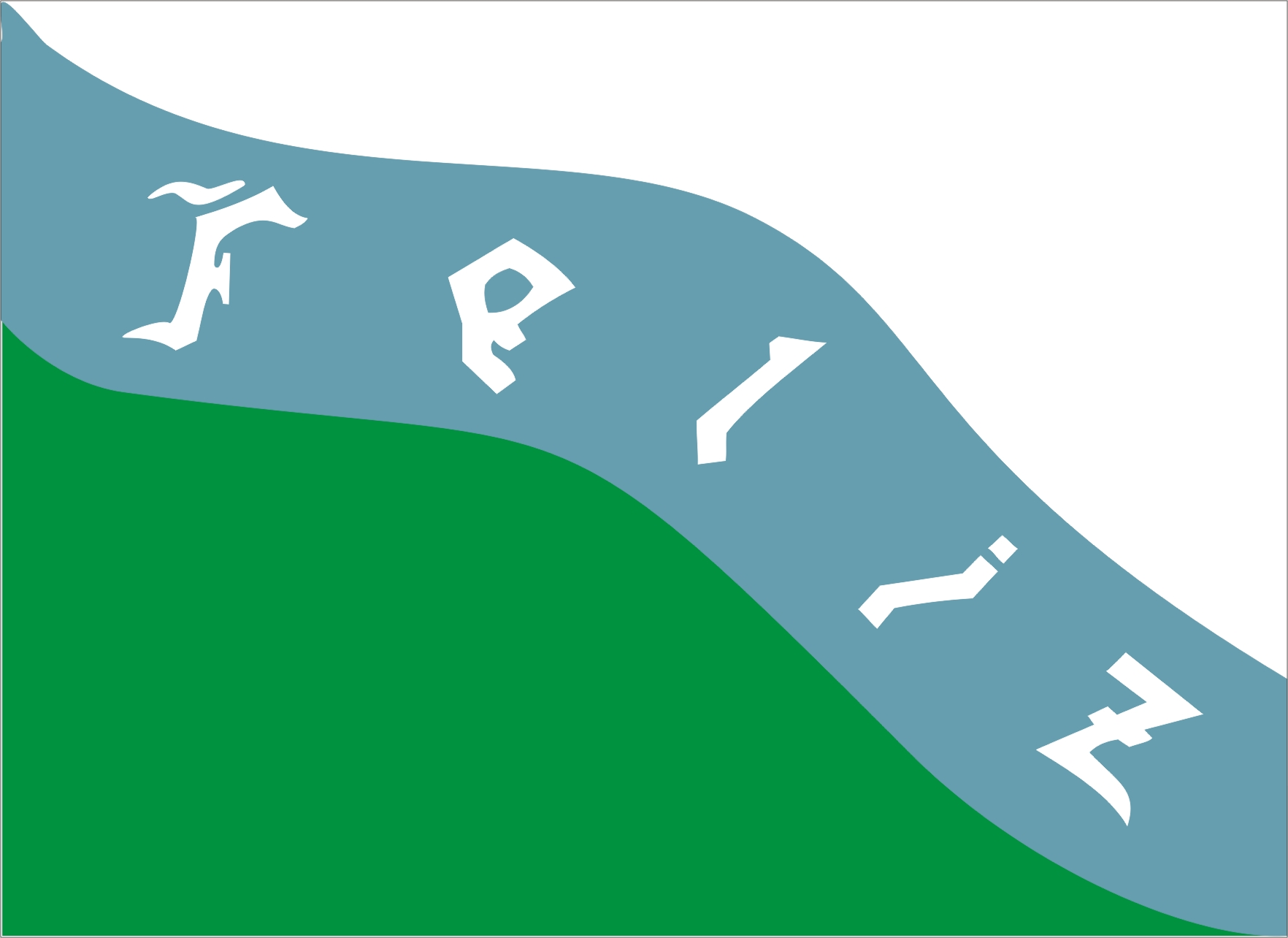
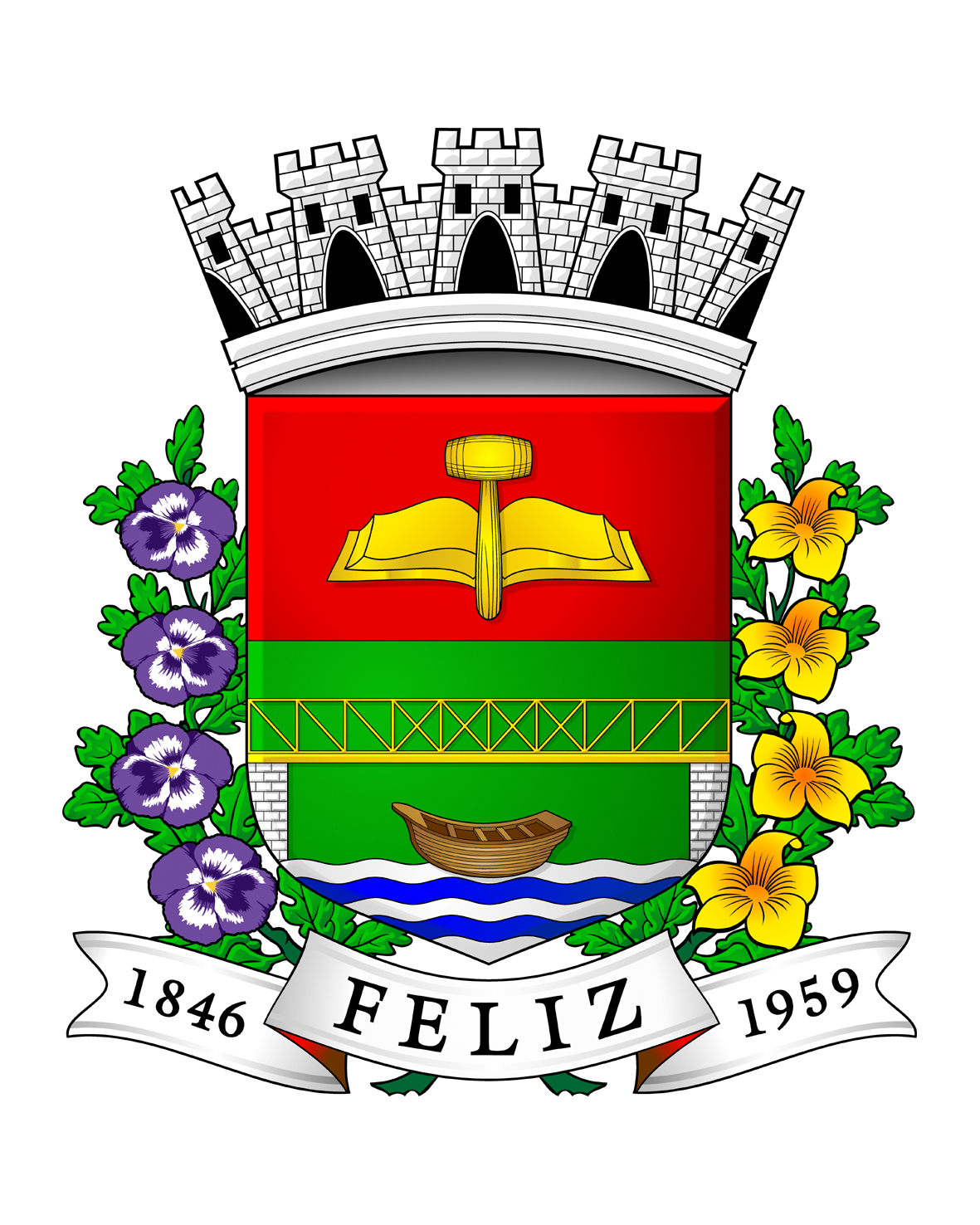
- Flag Coat of arms

- Location of Feliz
- Coordinates: 29°27′03″S 51°18′21″W
- Country: Brazil
- Region: Sul
- State: Rio Grande do Sul
- Founded: 17 February 1959

Area
  - Total: 96.232 km^{2} (37.155 sq mi)

Population (2020)
  - Total: 13,640
- Time zone: UTC−3 (BRT)

Feliz is a municipality in the Brazilian state of Rio Grande do Sul. (Municipalities, in this case, are sections of cities/villages in Brazil, which are like counties in the United States of America.) The population of Feliz was 13,640 as of 2020. Feliz was founded in February 1959. The area of Feliz is approximately 37 square miles (96 km^{2}). Feliz is in the Brazilian region of Sul, which is the southernmost region of Brazil.

== See also ==
- List of municipalities in Rio Grande do Sul
