= Jones–Shafroth Act =

1917 law granting U.S. citizenship to residents of Puerto Rico

Puerto Rico Federal Relations Act of 1917
- Other short titles: Jones–Shafroth Act, Jones Law of Puerto Rico
- Long title: An Act to provide a civil government for Porto Rico, and for other purposes
- Enacted by: the 64th United States Congress
- Effective: March 2, 1917

Citations
- Public law: 64–368
- Statutes at Large: 39 Stat. 951

Codification
- Acts amended: Foraker Act

Legislative history
- Signed into law by President Woodrow Wilson on March 2, 1917

The Jones–Shafroth Act (Pub. L. 64–368, 39 Stat. 951, enacted March 2, 1917), officially called An Act to provide a civil government for Porto Rico, and for other purposes (Note: The spelling Porto Rico was used (in English) for the territory from 1898 to 1932.) and later the Puerto Rico Federal Relations Act of 1917, (Note: Pub. L. 81–600 "Except as provided in section 5 of this Act, the Act entitled "An Act to provide a civil government for Porto Rico, and for other purposes", approved March 2, 1917, as amended, is hereby continued in force and effect and may hereafter be cited as the "Puerto Rican Federal Relations Act".") or unofficially the Organic Act of Puerto Rico, is an organic act of the 64th United States Congress that was signed into law by President Woodrow Wilson on March 2, 1917. The Act expanded the civil administration of the insular government of Puerto Rico, which was established under the federal jurisdiction of the United States as the local governance of an unincorporated territory through the Foraker Act of 1900. It served as the primary organic law for the government of Puerto Rico and its relation with the United States until it was superseded by the Constitution of Puerto Rico in 1952 as per the Puerto Rico Federal Relations Act of 1950 and its Pub. L. 82–447 joint resolution.

Bearing the names of its sponsors, Representative William Atkinson Jones, (D-Virginia), chairman of the House Committee on Insular Affairs, and Senator John Shafroth, (D-Colorado), chairman of the Committee on Pacific Islands and Puerto Rico, the Jones–Shafroth Act, which operated as a de facto constitution, established a bill of rights based on the United States Bill of Rights and granted statutory birthright United States citizenship to anyone born in the archipelago and island on or after April 11, 1899.

The Act expanded the executive and legislative branches of the insular government of Puerto Rico. It created the executive departments of Justice, Education, Finance, Interior, Labor and Agriculture, and Health, with their heads, the first two appointed by the President of the United States, and the rest appointed by the Governor, who was also appointed by the President, forming an executive council to the Governor. It formed a legislative 19-member Senate elected by the residents of Puerto Rico, and increased the membership and term length of the House of Representatives to 39 popularly elected members serving four-year terms. It also increased to four years the term length of the Resident Commissioner, a non-voting member to the United States House of Representatives elected by the residents of Puerto Rico. Additionally, it exempted Puerto Rican bonds from federal, state, and local taxes regardless of where the bondholder resides. (Note: Pub. L. 64–145 §3 "... all bonds issued by the government of Porto Rico, or by its authority, shall be exempt from taxation by the government of the United States, or by the government of Porto Rico or of any political or municipal subdivision thereof, or by any state, or by any county, municipality, or other municipal subdivision of any state or territory of the United States, or by the District of Columbia.")

The Jones–Shafroth Act provided an advance in local self-government for Puerto Rico. By creating the Legislative Assembly of Puerto Rico, composed of a popularly elected Senate and House of Representatives, it gave the residents of Puerto Rico control over the legislative branch. However, the President and the United States Congress possessed authorization to veto and annul any law enacted by the Legislative Assembly. While the President retained control of the executive and judicial branches through his authority to appoint the Governor, Attorney General, Commissioner of Education, and Justices of the Supreme Court of Puerto Rico, an opportunity for participation in the formulation of executive policies was provided to the residents of Puerto Rico by authorizing the Governor to appoint four of six heads of executive departments with the advice and consent of the popularly elected Senate.

== Impetus ==
The impetus for the Jones–Shafroth Act came from a complex of local and federal interests, including the Selective Service Act of 1917, which goal was to increase the force of the national army of the United States for service in World War I through conscription.

At the time of the Act, Puerto Ricans lacked internationally recognized citizenship, but pro-independence officials in Puerto Rico were wary of "imposing citizenship." Luis Muñoz Rivera, Resident Commissioner in Washington, argued against United States citizenship, giving several speeches in the House of Representatives. On 5 May 1916, he expressed the following:

Give us now the field of experiment which we ask of you... It is easy for us to set up a stable republican government with all possible guarantees for all possible interests. And afterwards, when you... give us our independence... you will stand before humanity as a great creator of new nationalities and a great liberator of oppressed people. ... as you know, the final aspiration of my party is nationalism with or without American protectorate, and as the Puerto Rican people understand it, the granting of (US) citizenship will interfere with their aspirations for independence.

Despite the objections raised by Muñoz Rivera, the Act was passed by the 64th United States Congress and was signed into law by President Woodrow Wilson on March 2, 1917.

== Major features ==
The Jones–Shafroth Act made the citizens of Puerto Rico citizens of the United States and reformed the system of government in Puerto Rico. In some respects, the governmental structure paralleled that of a state of the United States. Powers were separated among executive, judicial, and legislative branches. The law also recognized certain civil rights through a bill of rights to be observed by the government of Puerto Rico (although trial by jury was not among them).

=== Citizenship ===
The Jones–Shafroth Act granted statutory birthright United States citizenship to anyone born in the archipelago and island on or after April 11, 1899. The law was reinforced by and remains in effect under the Immigration and Nationality Act of 1952 (Public Law 414 of June 27, 1952 SEC.302) as follows:

§1402. Persons born in Puerto Rico on or after April 11, 1899

All persons born in Puerto Rico on or after April 11, 1899, and prior to January 13, 1941, subject to the jurisdiction of the United States, residing on January 13, 1941, in Puerto Rico or another territory over which the United States exercises rights of sovereignty and not citizens of the United States under any other Act, are declared to be citizens of the United States as of January 13, 1941. All persons born in Puerto Rico on or after January 13, 1941, and subject to the jurisdiction of the United States, are citizens of the United States at birth.

(June 27, 1952, ch. 477, title III, ch. 1, §302, 66 Stat. 236.)

The Act abolished racial restrictions found in United States immigration and naturalization statutes going back to the Naturalization Act of 1790. The 1952 Act retained a quota system for nationalities and regions. Eventually, the Act established a preference system that determined which ethnic groups were desirable immigrants and placed great importance on labor qualifications. The Act defined three types of immigrants: immigrants with special skills or who had relatives of U.S. citizens, who were exempt from quotas and who were to be admitted without restrictions; average immigrants whose numbers were not supposed to exceed 270,000 per year; and refugees.

It expanded the definition of the "United States" for nationality purposes, which already included Puerto Rico and the Virgin Islands, to add Guam. Persons born in these territories on or after December 24, 1952, acquire U.S. citizenship at birth on the same terms as persons born in other parts of the United States.

Residents of the island were granted United States citizenship and allowed to reject it voluntarily within six months of the act being established. Of the almost 1.2 million residents on the island, only 288 rejected it.

Presently, Puerto Rico lacks voting representation in Congress, and residents of the island aren't qualified to participate in general elections but can only vote in primaries. Puerto Ricans residing on the U.S. mainland, however, have the option to register and vote in their respective states.

=== Legislators ===
The Act created a bicameral local legislature composed of a Senate with 19 members and a House of Representatives with 39 members. The legislature was to be elected by universal male suffrage for a term of four years. Bills passed by the legislature could be vetoed by the Governor, but his veto could be overridden by a two-thirds vote, in which case the President of the United States would make the final decision.

Matters relating to franchises and concessions were vested in a Public Service Commission, consisting of the heads of the executive departments, the auditor, and two elected commissioners. A Resident Commissioner representing Puerto Rico as a non-voting delegate to the U.S. House of Representatives was elected by popular vote to a four-year term.

=== Executive branch ===
Under the Act, six executive departments were constituted: Justice, Finance, Interior, Education, Agriculture, Labor, and Health. The governor, the attorney-general, and the commissioner of education were appointed by the President with the approval of the U.S. Senate; the heads of the remaining departments were appointed by the governor of Puerto Rico, subject to the approval of the Puerto Rican Senate.

The Governor of Puerto Rico was to be appointed by the President of the United States, not elected. All cabinet officials had to be approved by the United States Senate, and the United States Congress had the power to veto any law passed by the Puerto Rican Legislature. Washington maintained control over fiscal and economic matters and exercised authority over mail services, immigration, defense, and other basic governmental matters. Puerto Rico was not given electoral votes in the election of U.S. President, because the Constitution of the United States of America allows only full-fledged states to have electoral votes.

=== Triple tax exemption ===
Section 3 of the act also exempted Puerto Rican bonds from federal, state, and local taxes regardless of where the bondholder resides. This has made Puerto Rican bonds extremely attractive to municipal investors as they may inure from holding a bond issued by a state or municipality different from the one where they reside. This is because municipal bonds that enjoy triple tax exemption are typically granted such exemption solely for bondholders that reside in the state that issues them.

== Effects ==
=== Conscription ===
Under the Foraker Act of 1900, which established an insular government in Puerto Rico under the federal jurisdiction of the United States, the residents of Puerto Rico were nationals but not citizens of the United States. With the enactment of the Jones–Shafroth Act in 1917, the residents of the archipelago and island became birthright citizens of the United States.

Two months after the 64th United States Congress passed the act, it enacted the Selective Service Act of 1917, basing conscription "upon liability to military service of all male citizens." The federal government, through the Jones–Shafroth Act and other laws of the United States applicable to territories, including the National Defense Act of 1916, imposed mandatory conscription into the military of the United States on all male citizens of the United States, including the residents of Puerto Rico, immediately before the United States entered World War I on April 6, 1917. As a result, around 20,000 Puerto Ricans served in the armed forces of the United States during World War I, and 65,000 in World War II.

=== Migration ===
The Jones-Shafroth Act of 1917 spurred significant migration to the contiguous United States, particularly to New York State, as the granting of United States citizenship allowed the residents of Puerto Rico to legally travel to and reside in American territory. Around 42,000 Puerto Ricans relocated to the mainland United States throughout the 1920s.

== Subsequent legislation ==
Portions of the Jones–Shafroth Act were superseded by the Elective Governor Act of 1947 (Crawford-Butler Act), which granted the residents of Puerto Rico the right to elect a governor, and by the Puerto Rico Federal Relations Act of 1950, which granted Puerto Rico the right to constitutional self-governance. Ratified by the electorate of and implemented in Puerto Rico in 1952, the Constitution provided self-governance to the archipelago and island as an unincorporated territory under the designation of commonwealth.
