= 2024 Puerto Rico gubernatorial election =

- November 5, 2024
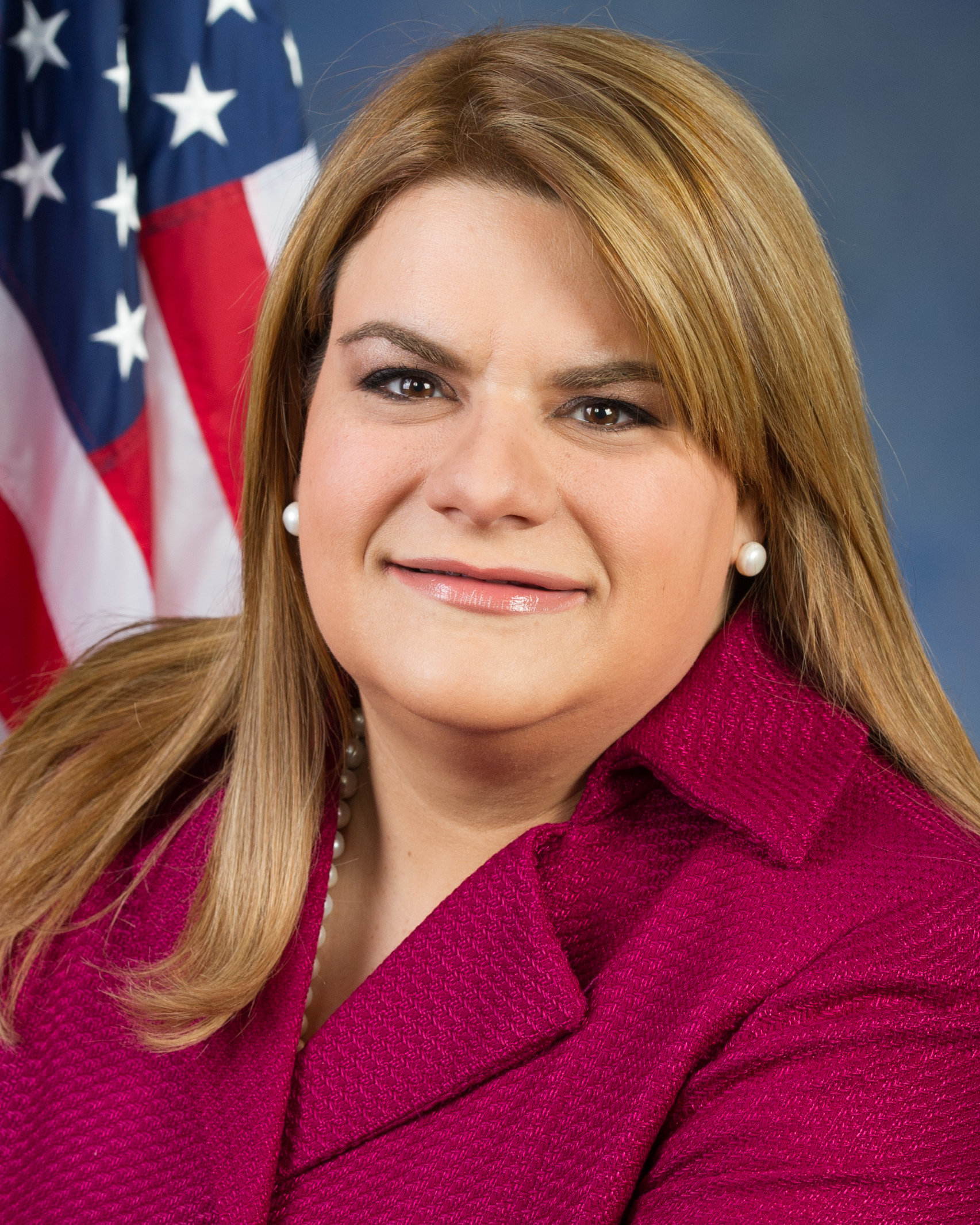

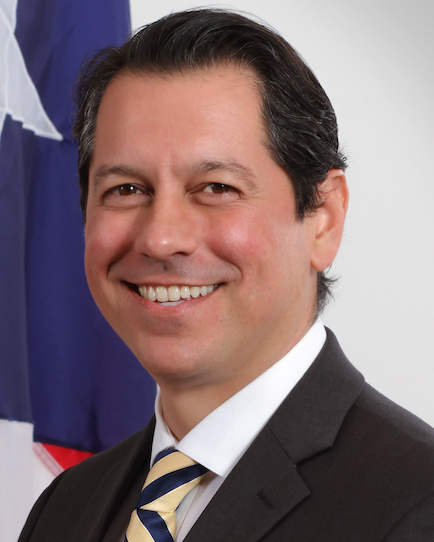

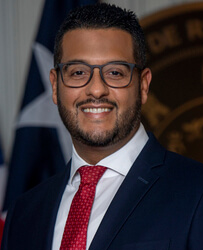

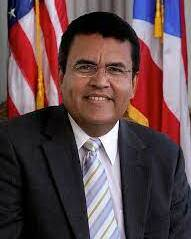
Nominee	Jenniffer González-Colón	Juan Dalmau
Party	New Progressive	Independence
Alliance	Republican	Alianza de País
Popular vote	524,373	391,945
Percentage	41.22%	30.81%
Nominee	Jesús Manuel Ortiz	Javier Jiménez
Party	Popular Democratic	Project Dignity
Alliance	Democratic	Republican
Popular vote	273,162	81,251
Percentage	21.47%	6.39%
- Results by municipality González: 30–40% 40–50% 50–60% Dalmau: 30–40% 40–50%
Governor before election
Pedro Pierluisi
New Progressive
Elected Governor
Jenniffer González-Colón
New Progressive

Gubernatorial elections were held on Tuesday, November 5, 2024, to elect the governor of Puerto Rico, concurrently with the election of the Resident Commissioner, the Senate, the House of Representatives, and the mayors of the 78 municipalities, as well as the election events of a status referendum and a presidential straw poll. As a candidate in the 2024 general elections, the winner was elected to serve a four-year term from January 2, 2025 to January 2, 2029.

Two parties filed to hold a primary election: the New Progressive Party and the Popular Democratic Party. Incumbent New Progressive Party Governor Pedro Pierluisi Urrutia ran for re-election to a second term in office, but lost the PNP primary to Resident Commissioner Jenniffer Gonzalez Colon. The Popular Democratic Party nominated Jesús Manuel Ortíz, a member of the House of Representatives of Puerto Rico. The Puerto Rican Independence Party and Citizens' Victory Movement formed an electoral alliance, with both parties agreeing to support former member of the Senate of Puerto Rico, Juan Dalmau. However, since all registered parties are required to nominate a candidate for governor, Movimiento Victoria Ciudadana nominated dummy candidate Javier Córdova Iturregui. Project Dignity nominated San Sebastián mayor Javier Jiménez.

González Colón ultimately won the general election. This was the first Puerto Rico gubernatorial election since 1952 in which a candidate from the Independence Party finished second in a gubernatorial race, the first time since 1964 in which the incumbent governing party was re-elected after two terms in office, and the second time Puerto Rico has elected a female governor. (Note: The first time was in 2000, when Sila María Calderón was elected.) This election also saw the Popular Democratic Party lose control of the Legislative Assembly of Puerto Rico and finish third for the first time in its entire history in a gubernatorial election, albeit retaining a majority of mayoral races and flipping the office of Resident Commissioner.

== Parties ==
=== New Progressive primary ===
On March 20, 2022, during the New Progressive Party's general assembly, governor Pedro Pierluisi announced that he would run for a second term. In an interview on August 28, he reaffirmed the press that he would be in fact running again, stating that "Puerto Rico is moving forward and there is no one who can stop us" and that they were "going to beat the PDP". Resident Commissioner Jenniffer González Colón won the primary against Governor Pierluisi, becoming the first-ever female gubernatorial nominee for the New Progressive Party.

==== Candidates ====
===== Nominee =====
- Jenniffer González Colón, Resident Commissioner of Puerto Rico

===== Eliminated in primary =====
- Pedro Pierluisi, incumbent governor

==== Endorsements ====
Jenniffer González Colón

Federal officials

- Elmer Román, former director of mission integration in the Office of the Under Secretary of Defense for Research and Engineering and former Puerto Rico Secretary of State

Territorial legislators

- Carlos Johnny Méndez, territorial representative
- Yashira Lebrón Rodríguez, territorial representative
- Angel Peña Ramírez, territorial representative

Local officials

- Ramón Luis Rivera Jr., mayor of Bayamón
- María Vega Pagán, mayor of Vega Alta and former territorial representative
- 3 other mayors
Pedro Pierluisi

State cabinet officials

- Larry Seilhamer, former Puerto Rico Secretary of State

Statewide officials

- Ricardo Rosselló, Shadow representative and former Governor of Puerto Rico

Territorial legislators

- José Kikito Meléndez, territorial representative
- William Villafañe, territorial senator

==== Polling ====
Poll source	Date(s) administered	Sample size (Note: Key: A – all adults RV – registered voters LV – likely voters V – unclear)	Margin of error	Pedro Pierluisi	Jenniffer González Colón	Others	Undecided
Pasquines	22–30 May 2024	483 (RV)	–	63%	35%	1% (Note: "None of the above" with 1%)	1%
Noticel and Atlas Intel	8–12 October 2023	2,350 (Note: unclear subgroup) (A)	± 2.0%	50.4%	42.4%	–	6.1%
El Nuevo Día and The Research Office	31 January – 5 February 2023	≈400 (A)	± 6.0%	25%	64%	3%	3%

==== Results ====
Results by municipality

New Progressive primary results
Party	Candidate	Votes	%
New Progressive	Jenniffer Gonzalez Colon	159,527	54.57%
New Progressive	Pedro Pierluisi (incumbent)	132,805	45.43%
Total votes		292,332	100.0%

=== Popular Democratic primary ===
After suffering defeat in the 2020 elections, the Popular Democratic Party suffered a major divide on opinions, from the topic of abortion to what political status should the party pursue in the case of an 8th plebiscite. Some like the former party president José Luis Dalmau say that the party should keep supporting the current political status (ELA), while others within the party like former territorial senator Marco Rigau Jiménez stated that the party should move towards Free Association.

On June 16, 2022, while criticizing the party president José Dalmau, Morovis mayor Carmen Maldonado González challenged him, and announced that she would be running for governor. Later, on October 17, she officialized her candidacy in a press conference. Afterward, on January 18, 2023, she stated that she would run for president of the party. On May 7, after coming last on the presidency election, she conceded and announced that she would instead be running for re-election.

Territorial senator Juan Zaragoza Gómez announced his candidacy for governor during a press conference on September 13, 2022, saying that "If God gives me health, I'm going there". Zaragoza previously had announced that he would run for governor in the 2020 primary, before withdrawing his candidacy to run as territorial senator at-large.

==== Candidates ====
===== Nominee =====
- Jesús Manuel Ortiz, territorial representative and president of the PPD

===== Eliminated in primary =====
- Juan Zaragoza, at-large territorial senator and former Puerto Rico Secretary of Treasury

===== Withdrawn =====
- Carlos Delgado Altieri, former mayor of Isabela and nominee for governor in 2020
- Carmen Maldonado González, mayor of Morovis

==== Endorsements ====
Jesús Manuel Ortiz

Territorial legislators

- Ramón Luis Cruz, territorial representative
- Migdalia González, territorial senator
- José Rivera Madera, territorial representative
- Juan J. Santiago Nieves, territorial representative

Local officials

- Pedro García Figueroa, mayor of Hormigueros
- Juan Carlos García Padilla, mayor of Coamo
- Gregory González, mayor of Peñuelas
- Ramón Hernández Torres, mayor of Juana Díaz
Juan Zaragoza

State cabinet officials

- Idalia Colón Roldón, former secretary of the Puerto Rico Department of the Family

Territorial legislators

- Javier Aponte Dalmau, territorial senator
- Charlie Hernández, former territorial representative

Local officials

- Julio Roldán Concepción, mayor of Aguadilla

==== Polling ====
Poll source	Date(s) administered	Sample size	Margin of error	Jesús Manuel Ortiz	Carlos Delgado Altieri	José Luis Dalmau	Juan Zaragoza	Luis Javier Hernández	Carmen Maldonado González	Others	Undecided / Abstain
El Nuevo Día and The Research Office	24–29 October 2023	≈1,000 (A)	± 6.0%	30%	26%	17%	13%	13%	–	–	1%
Noticel and Atlas Intel	8 – 12 October 2023	≈2,350 (A)	± 6.0%	42.6%	16.4%	5.6%	3.8%	17.3%	–	–	14.4%
El Nuevo Día and The Research Office	31 January – 5 February 2023	≈400 (A)	± 6.0%	–	28%	24%	19%	4%	8%	6%	–

==== Results ====
Popular Democratic primary results
Party	Candidate	Votes	%
Popular Democratic	Jesús Manuel Ortiz	83,045	61.71%
Popular Democratic	Juan Zaragoza Gómez	51,534	38.29%
Total votes		134,579	100.0%

=== Alianza de País (MVC-PIP Alliance) ===
The Puerto Rican Independence Party (PIP) and Citizens' Victory Movement (MVC) have formed an alliance for the 2024 elections. MVC has agreed to support PIP's nominee, Juan Dalmau Ramírez. However, Puerto Rico law requires all parties to nominate a candidate for governor, so MVC nominated Javier Córdova Iturregui as a placeholder candidate.

==== PIP nominee ====
- Juan Dalmau Ramírez, former at-large territorial senator and nominee for governor in 2020

==== MVC nominee ====
- Javier Córdova Iturregui, university professor, union leader, and perennial candidate

==== Endorsements ====
Juan Dalmau

Political parties

- Citizens' Victory Movement
- Hostosian National Independence Movement
- Workers' Socialist Movement

Newspapers

- Momento Crítico

=== Project Dignity ===
==== Candidates ====
Ada Norah Henriquez, who ran for resident commissioner in 2020, announced on 23 May 2023, while on the La Trinchera podcast that "we are going to aspire for the executive."

César Vázquez Muñiz, the president of the party and the nominee for governor in 2020, announced on 27 May 2023, while at a protest asking for the resignation of the Secretary of Justice of Puerto Rico Domingo Emanuelli, that he would be running again for governor, stating that "What you see is not asked". He later dropped out to run for territorial senate in the Bayamón district.

Javier Jiménez Pérez, mayor of San Sebastián del Pepino, who switched to Proyecto Dignidad earlier, announced his intention to run. This was further confirmed by a party assembly that certified the party will hold primaries to select the candidate.

Henriquez announced in December 2023 that she would run as an independent, leaving Jiménez as the only candidate seeking the PD nomination.

===== Nominee =====
- Javier Jiménez, mayor of San Sebastián and president of Project Dignity

===== Withdrawn =====
- César Vázquez Muñiz, former president of Project Dignity and nominee for governor in 2020 (ran for territorial senate)
- Ada Norah Henriquez, attorney and nominee for resident commissioner in 2020 (ran as a write-in candidate)

===== Declined =====
- Joanne Rodríguez Veve, at-large territorial senator (endorsed Jiménez)

==== Endorsements ====
Javier Jiménez

Territorial legislators

- Lisie Burgos Muñiz, territorial representative
- Joanne Rodríguez Veve, at-large territorial senator

== Independents ==
=== Disqualified ===
- Victor Luis Medina Cruz, physician
- Ada Norah Henriquez, attorney and Project Dignity nominee for resident commissioner in 2020 (running as a write-in candidate)
- Carlos Cintrón Rivera

== General election ==
=== Debate ===
Dates	Location	González- Colón	Manuel Ortiz	Dalmau	Jiménez	Link
October 2, 2024	WAPA Studios; Guaynabo	Participant	Participant	Participant	Participant	YouTube

=== Polling ===
Poll source	Date(s) administered	Sample size (Note: Key: A – all adults RV – registered voters LV – likely voters V – unclear)	Margin of error	Jenniffer González- Colón (PNP)	Jesús Manuel Ortiz (PPD)	Juan Dalmau (PIP)	Javier Jiménez (PD)	Undecided
AtlasIntel	November 1–4, 2024	4,914 (LV)	± 1.0%	36%	20%	35%	8%	2%
Lit Data PR	November 1–4, 2024	800 (A)	± 3.39%	39.89%	16.01%	34.55%	9.55%	—
El Nuevo Día/The Research Office	October 29 – November 1, 2024	1,000 (LV)	—N/a	37%	22%	29%	7%	5%
Lit Data PR	October 25 – November 1, 2024	800 (A)	± 3.39%	35%	15%	34%	8%	9%
Lit Data PR	October 25 – November 1, 2024	800 (A)	± 3.39%	38%	16%	36%	10%	—N/a
Pasquines	October 21 – November 1, 2024	(A)	—N/a	37%	23%	31%	7%	3% (Note: "None of the Above" with 1%; Iturregui[ (MVC) with 1%)
IZQ Strategies	October 14–31, 2024	1,651 (LV)	± 3.0%	35%	17%	37%	7%	4%
Bacon Research	October 25–29, 2024	807 (LV)	± 3.0%	32%	18%	25%	7%	17% (Note: "Won't Vote" with 6%)
Lit Data PR	October 18–25, 2024	800 (A)	± 3.39%	32%	14%	30%	7%	17%
Lit Data PR	October 18–25, 2024	800 (A)	± 3.39%	38%	17%	36%	9%	—N/a
Consultoría Académica e Investigación Social LLC	October 10–22, 2024	784 (V)	—N/a	38%	17%	30%	13%	2%
Lit Data PR	October 11–18, 2024	800 (A)	± 3.39%	34%	13%	28%	6%	18%
Gaither International	October 1–16, 2024	1,109 (A)	± 2.94%	31%	18%	29%	8%	14%
Lit Data PR	October 4–11, 2024	800 (A)	± 3.39%	34%	17%	26%	5%	18%
Bacon Research	October 3–10, 2024	807 (LV)	± 3.0%	33%	20%	20%	7%	20% (Note: "Won't Vote" with 7%; Iturregui[ (MVC) with 1%)
Lit Data PR	September 27 – October 4, 2024	800 (A)	± 3.39%	30%	13%	25%	4%	28%
El Nuevo Día/The Research Office	September 28 – October 2, 2024	1,000 (RV)	± 3%	37%	22%	25%	9%	7%
Lit Data PR	September 21–27, 2024	800 (A)	—N/a	35%	12%	21%	5%	26%
Lit Data PR	September 5–20, 2024	800 (A)	—N/a	34%	10%	21%	5%	30% (Note: Iturregui[ (MVC) with 1%)
Consultoría Académica e Investigación Social LLC	August 31 – September 3, 2024	—N/a	—N/a	37%	23%	25%	12%	3% (Note: Iturregui (MVC) with 1%)
Gaither International (Note: Poll sponsored by El Vocero de Puerto Rico, WAPA-TV, and WKAQ)	June 23 – July 8, 2024	1,109 (A)	± 2%	43%	14%	23%	9%	10%
El Nuevo Día/The Research Office	February 20–25, 2024	1,000 (V)	—N/a	38%	30%	10%	8%	14%
AtlasIntel (Note: Poll sponsored by Noticel)	February 15–22, 2024	2,200 (V)	—N/a	33%	20%	25%	8%	16% (Note: "No Voteria" with 12%)

=== Results ===
Candidate	Party	Votes	%
Jenniffer González-Colón	New Progressive Party	526,020	41.22
Juan Dalmau	Puerto Rican Independence Party	392,185	30.73
Jesús Manuel Ortiz	Popular Democratic Party	273,649	21.44
Javier Jiménez	Project Dignity	81,369	6.38
Javier Córdova Iturregu (Note: Paper candidate)	Citizens' Victory Movement	1,522	0.12
Write-ins		1,362	0.11
Total		1,276,107	100.00
Valid votes		1,276,107	99.62
Invalid votes		1,592	0.12
Blank votes		3,305	0.26
Total votes		1,281,004	100.00
Registered voters/turnout		1,987,317	64.46
Source: CEEPUR

== See also ==
- 2024 United States gubernatorial elections

== Notes ==
Partisan clients
