= 2024 Puerto Rican general election =

- November 5, 2024
- Gubernatorial election
- Turnout: 64.46%
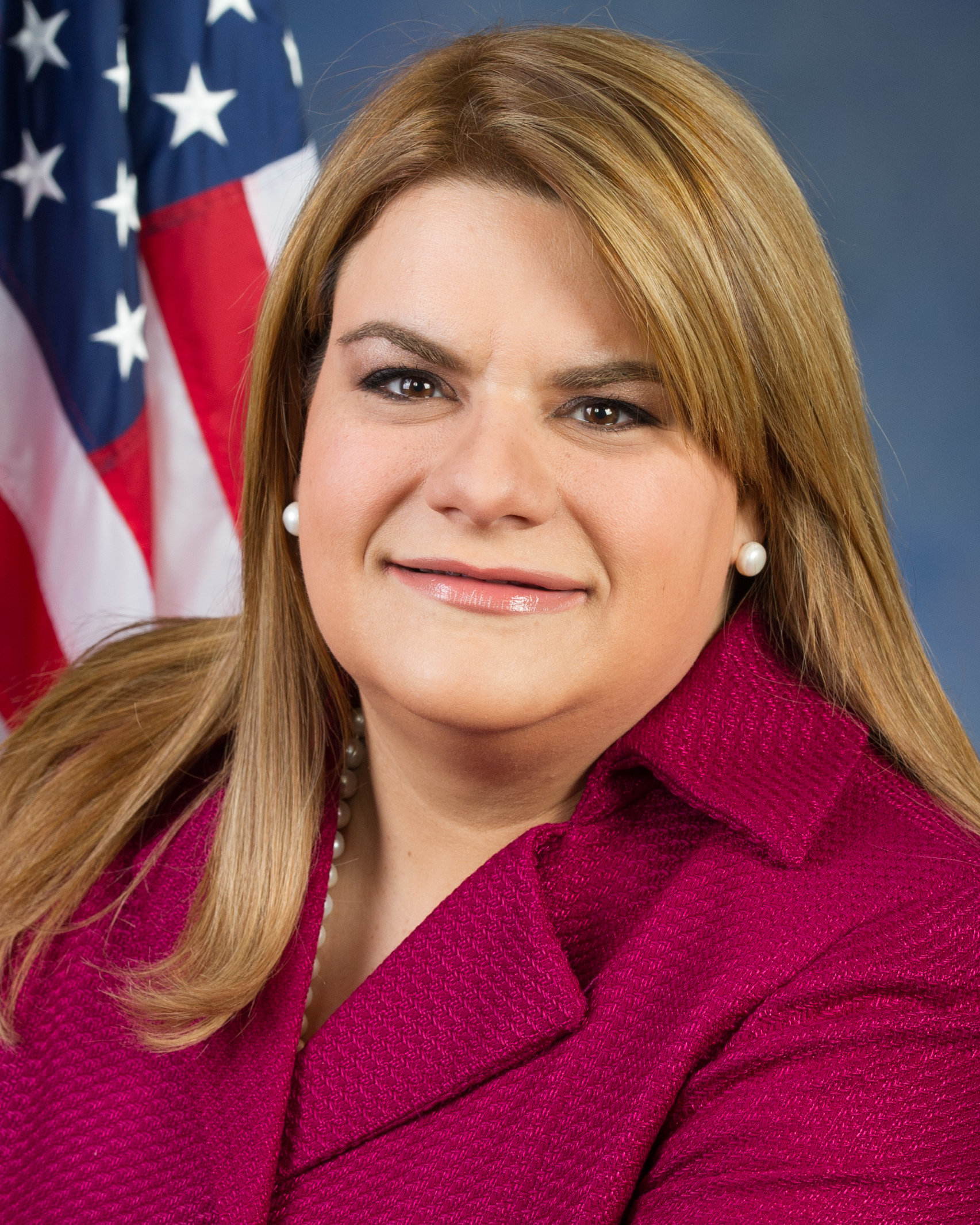

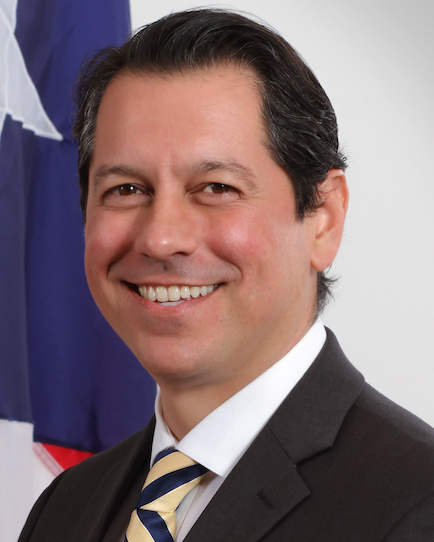

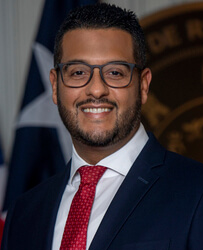

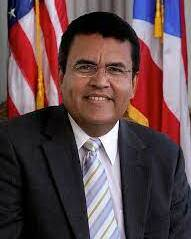
Nominee	Jenniffer González Colón	Juan Dalmau Ramírez
Party	New Progressive	Independence
Popular vote	526,020	392,185
Percentage	41.22%	30.73%
Nominee	Jesús Manuel Ortiz	Javier Jiménez
Party	Popular Democratic	Project Dignity
Popular vote	273,649	81,369
Percentage	21.44%	6.38%
- Results by municipality González: 30–40% 40–50% 50–60% Dalmau: 30–40% 40–50%
Governor before election
Pedro Pierluisi
New Progressive
Elected Governor
Jennifer Gonzalez Colon
New Progressive
- Resident Commissioner election
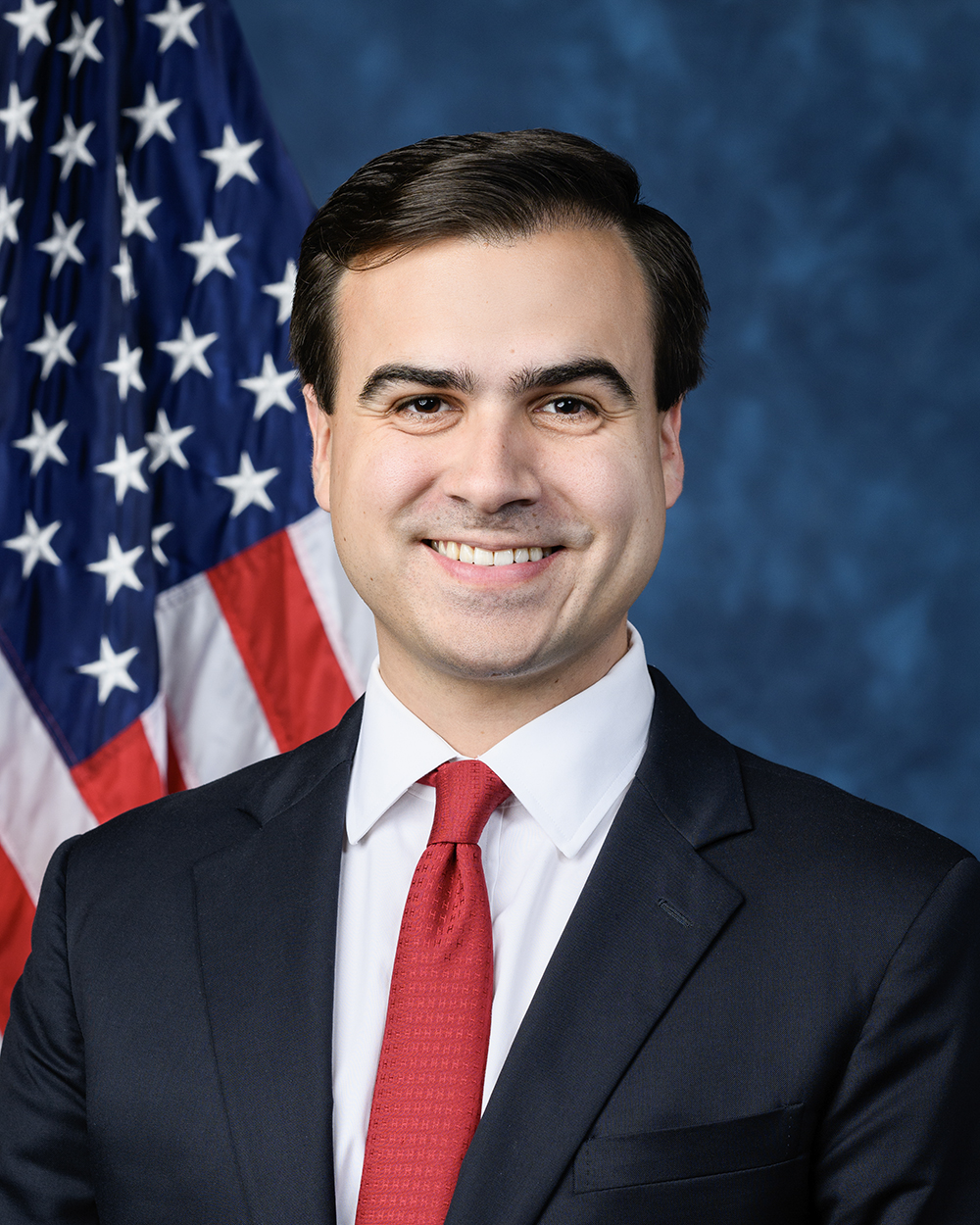

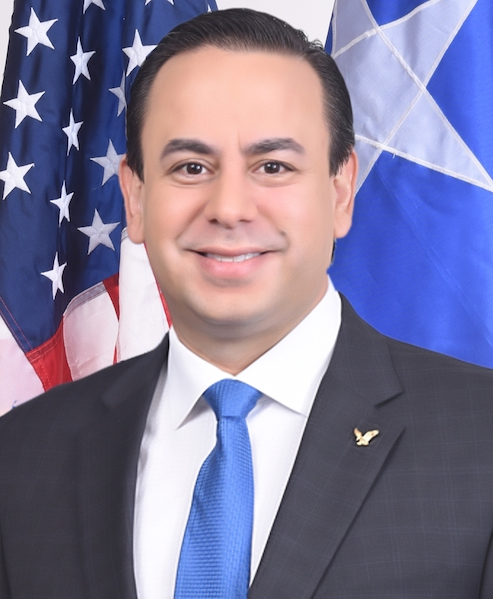

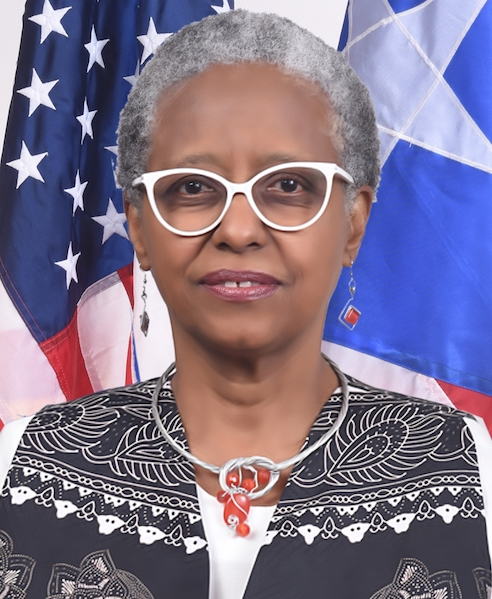
Nominee	Pablo José Hernández Rivera	William Villafañe	Ana Irma Rivera Lassén
Party	Popular Democratic	New Progressive	Citizens' Victory
Popular vote	530,540	452,615	115,710
Percentage	43.48%	37.09%	9.48%
- Results by municipality Hernández: 40–50% 50–60% Villafañe: 40–50% 50–60%
Resident Commissioner before election
Jenniffer González
New Progressive
Elected Resident Commissioner
Pablo Hernández Rivera
Popular Democratic

General elections were held in Puerto Rico on November 5, 2024, alongside the 2024 United States elections, to elect the officials of the Puerto Rican government who will serve from January 2025 to January 2029, most notably the position of Governor and Resident Commissioner. A non-binding status referendum and a straw poll for the 2024 United States presidential election were held.

Incumbent Republican affiliated Resident Commissioner Jenniffer González Colón announced she would run for Governor of Puerto Rico and challenge incumbent Pedro Pierluisi in 2024. In an upset, she defeated him in the primary with 54.57% of the vote and became the first woman to run as the PNP's candidate in a gubernatorial election. On November 5, 2024, Jennifer Gonzalez won the office of Governor of Puerto Rico in the 2024 general election, with 41.22% of the vote and beating Puerto Rican Independence Party candidate Juan Dalmau Ramírez by over 10 points.

On January 2, 2025, Colón was sworn into office as Governor of Puerto Rico, the second woman to be elected to the position and the third woman to serve.

== Background ==
Primaries were held on June 2, 2024, with incumbent Resident Commissioner Jenniffer González-Colón winning the New Progressive primary defeating incumbent Governor Pedro Pierluisi. This continued the tradition of the Governor of Puerto Rico only serving one term that started with Governor Sila María Calderón and the Popular Democratic Party 20 years prior in the 2004 gubernatorial election.

Territorial representative and president of the Popular Democratic Party, Jesús Manuel Ortiz, would secure the party's nomination for Governor, defeating at-large territorial senator and former Puerto Rico Secretary of Treasury, Juan Zaragoza.

In September 2024, the American Civil Liberties Union (ACLU) filed a lawsuit seeking a preliminary and permanent injunction, as well as a declaratory judgment, allowing potential voters to register, through October 6. On October 1, the US District Court dismissed the lawsuit on the basis that the ACLU failed to demonstrate that the September 21 voter registration deadline constituted an unconstitutional disenfranchisement or a manifest injustice that justified the intrusion of the United States federal government.

On October 7, 2024, the New Progressive Party (PNP) requested the court to order the State Commission on Elections to “immediately validate all applications for mail-in and advance ballots” that were not processed within two business days. However, shortly after, the PNP canceled his trial in which he requested the vote by correspondence without verification, and processed in cash, while his hearing was already scheduled.

On October 8, 2024, Electoral Commissioner Aníbal Vega Borges requested the court to immediately validate all applications for postal and advance voting received and not processed within the established deadline.

The State Commission on Elections received approximately 142,000 early voting applications. The commission's plenary session had agreed to start counting early votes on 11 October, but that date was aborted after the sending of such votes was delayed by more than a week. There is no official date for the start of counting of this vote.

On October 15, 2024, the State Commission on Elections authorized the participation of the American Civil Liberties Union as election observers in the polls.

On October 16, 2024, the Attorney for the United States District Court for the District of Puerto Rico, W. Stephen Muldrow appointed the Chief of the Financial Fraud and Corruption Section, Assistant United States Attorney Seth Erbe, to oversee elections, the appointed attorney, handles complaints regarding voting rights, threats of violence against election officials or staff, and voter fraud, on election day.

On October 22, 2024, the PNP filed a complaint against members of the Movimiento Victoria Ciudadana, for alleged violation of the electoral code, after having created an electronic platform for searching for voter numbers.

On October 28, 2024, the State Commission on Elections accepted a request from the Popular Democratic Party for the Absentee and Early Voting Administrative Board to review envelopes containing early mail-in voting ballots, where the legitimacy of the process was called into question.

On November 4, 2024, the Puerto Rican Independence Party, the Proyecto Dignidad and the Movimiento Victoria Ciudadana, request the State Commission on Elections that once the general elections are over, a recount of all early ballots be conducted to ensure that all marks made by the voter have been counted correctly. On the same day, a judge of the San Juan Court of First Instance ordered the State Commission on Elections to continue "without interruption" the counting of early votes, thus opening the door to the process taking place without the presence of representatives of all the conflicting parties.

On November 26, 2024, the PPD party requested an investigation by the State Election Commission (SEC) into allegations of irregularities regarding votes cast by mail, after alleged irregularities were detected in early voting sent by mail by voters.

On November 27, 2024, the San Juan District Court ordered the Puerto Rico State Electoral Commission (CEE) to count the mail-in votes of some voters who voted anonymously. The CEE will have to count and assign hundreds of ballots from voters even if they reside in the United States and not Puerto Rico, and others who voted in Puerto Rico, including the envelope of those who did not request early or mail-in voting or those who have died in the meantime since the election.

On December 3, 2024, the Citizen Victory Movement denounces the irregularities and attacks that tarnish the transparency of these elections, it also denounces the State Electoral Commission (CEE) in the voting process, it also denounces the order to count postal votes without validating the exact address of the voters.

On December 7, 2024, the State Electoral Commission (CEE) orders the allocation of 4,440 ballots from all electoral districts in Puerto Rico, arrested since October for not having duly complied with the requirement of validation of the identity of the voter. The Puerto Rican Independence Party (PIP) and the Alliance, appeal to the Court of First Instance of San Juan to review the decision of the State Electoral Commission (CEE).

On December 18, 2024, the PPD announced that it would contest the results of the mail-in ballot before the Supreme Court of Puerto Rico.

On December 24, 2024, the Observation Mission of the Inter-American Union of Electoral Organizations (UNIORE), which analyzed the general elections, concluded that the State Electoral Commission (CEE) was facing problems in the management and operation of the electronic counting machines.

On December 25, 2024, the Center for Investigative Journalism (CPI) filed a lawsuit against the State Election Commission (SEC) for failing to provide information requested by several journalists on election day.

Final certifications are due on December 26, 2024, as set by the Puerto Rico State Commission (CEE). Once the certification of the results is established by the state commission of Puerto Rico, the Office of Information System and Electronic Processing (OSIPE) communicates the official results. On December 27, 2024, the San Juan District Court orders the State Election Commission to adjudicate and count all direct votes, pushing back the official date for certification of the results. On the same day, the substitute president of the State Electoral Commission (CEE), Jessika Padilla Rivera, confirmed that the electoral commission informed the Ministry of Justice of the failures reported and acknowledged by the company Dominion Voting Systems during the 2024 general elections and the political party primaries.

Candidates receive certification on December 30, 2024, by the electoral commission, with the signature of the official committee.

On January 8, 2025, after several days of delays, the write-in candidate Eliezer Molina is certified as senator-elect by the State Electoral Commission (CEE).

== Results ==
=== Governor ===
Candidate	Party	Votes	%
Jenniffer González-Colón	New Progressive Party	526,020	41.22
Juan Dalmau	Puerto Rican Independence Party	392,185	30.73
Jesús Manuel Ortiz	Popular Democratic Party	273,649	21.44
Javier Jiménez	Proyecto Dignidad	81,369	6.38
Javier Córdova Iturregu (Note: Paper candidate)	Citizens' Victory Movement	1,522	0.12
Write-ins		1,362	0.11
Total		1,276,107	100.00
Valid votes		1,276,107	99.62
Invalid votes		1,592	0.12
Blank votes		3,305	0.26
Total votes		1,281,004	100.00
Registered voters/turnout		1,987,317	64.46
Source: CEEPUR

=== Resident commissioner ===
Candidate	Party	Votes	%
Pablo Hernández Rivera	Popular Democratic Party	530,540	43.48
William Villafañe	New Progressive Party	452,615	37.09
Ana Irma Rivera Lassén	Citizens' Victory Movement	115,710	9.48
Viviana Ramírez Morales	Proyecto Dignidad	60,512	4.96
Roberto Velázquez (Note: Paper candidate)	Puerto Rican Independence Party	60,161	4.93
Write-ins		624	0.05
Total		1,220,162	100.00
Valid votes		1,220,162	99.60
Invalid votes		1,592	0.13
Blank votes		3,305	0.27
Total votes		1,225,059	100.00
Registered voters/turnout		1,987,317	61.64
Source: CEEPUR

=== Senate ===
Elections for the Senate of Puerto Rico were held on November 5, 2024, alongside the 2024 United States elections. Primaries were held on June 2, 2024. Left-of-center parties PIP and MVC formed an electoral alliance for the 2024 elections, called the Alianza de País. They agreed to only run one candidate per Senate district to maximize their opportunities.

Party	District			At-large			Total seats	+/–
Party	Votes	%	Seats	Votes	%	Seats	Total seats	+/–
New Progressive Party	936,947	42.15	15	446,273	37.50	4	19	+9
Popular Democratic Party	729,922	32.84	1	325,053	27.32	4	5	–7
Puerto Rican Independence Party	198,570	8.93	0	178,575	15.01	1	1	0
Proyecto Dignidad	170,566	7.67	0	94,604	7.95	1	1	0
Movimiento Victoria Ciudadana	156,795	7.05	0				0	–2
Independents				60,799	5.11	0	0	–1
Write-ins	29,994	1.35	0	84,649	7.11	1	1	+1
Total	2,222,794	100.00	16	1,189,953	100.00	11	27	0
Valid votes				1,189,953	99.07			
Invalid/blank votes				1,019	0.08			
Blank votes				10,126	0.84			
Total votes				1,201,098	100.00			
Registered voters/turnout				1,987,317	60.44			
Source: CEEPUR

=== House of Representatives ===
Elections for the Puerto Rico House of Representatives were held on November 5, 2024, alongside the 2024 United States elections. Primaries were held on June 2, 2024.

Party	At-large			District			Total seats
Party	Votes	%	Seats	Votes	%	Seats	Total seats
New Progressive Party				498,434	42.85	30	36
Popular Democratic Party				411,374	35.36	10	14
Puerto Rican Independence Party				112,652	9.68	0	1
Movimiento Victoria Ciudadana				73,061	6.28	0	0
Proyecto Dignidad				67,757	5.82	0	1
Independents							1
Write-ins			–				–
Total				1,163,278	100.00	40	53
