= Puerto Rico Department of Treasury =

Government department of Puerto Rico

- Departamento de Hacienda de Puerto Rico
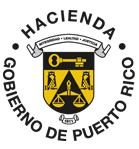

Agency overview
- Formed: 1811 (215 years ago)
- Type: Executive department
- Jurisdiction: Islandwide
- Headquarters: San Juan, PR
- Agency executive: Francisco Parés Alicea, Secretary
- Child agency: Office of the Commissioner of Financial Institutions
- Key documents: Power Act 1811; Foraker Act; Jones Act; Article IV of the Constitution of Puerto Rico; Reorganization Plan No. 3 of 1994
- Website: www.hacienda.gobierno.pr

Footnotes
- Dates back to the Cortes of Cádiz. Few historic documents of that era remain.

The Puerto Rico Department of Treasury (Spanish: Departamento de Hacienda de Puerto Rico) is the executive department of the government of Puerto Rico responsible for the treasury of the U.S. Commonwealth of Puerto Rico. It is one of the constitutionally-created executive departments and is headed by a Secretary.

The department collects taxes, operates the local lottery, and serves as the central disbursement agency of the government.

== Agencies ==
- Office of the Commissioner of Financial Institutions

== Secretary ==
- 1917–1922: José E. Benedicto
- 1922–1923: Ramón Aboy
- 1923–1924: J.W. Bonner
- 1924–1929: Juan G. Gallardo
- 1930–1935: Manuel V. Domenech
- 1935–1940: Rafael Sancho Bonet
- 1941–1948: Rafael Buscaglia
- 1949–1955: Sol Luis Descartes
- 1955–1958: Rafael Picó
- 1958–1963: José R. Noguera
- 1964–1968: Jorge Font Saldaña
- 1969–1970: Ángel M. Rivera
- 1970–1971: Ángel M. Martín
- 1971–1972: Wallace González Oliver
- 1972–1973: Raymond J. González
- 1973–1976: Salvador E. Casellas
- 1976–1981: Julio César Pérez
- 1981–1984: Carmen Ana Culpeper
- 1985–1989: Juan Agosto Alicea
- 1989–1992: Ramón García Santiago
- 1992–1993: Ángel Rivera
- 1993–1997: Manuel Díaz Saldaña
- 1997–2000: Xenia Vélez Silva
- 2001–2004: Juan A. Flores Galarza
- 2005–2007: Juan C. Méndez Torres
- 2008–2008: Ángel A. Ortiz García
- 2008–2009: José G. Dávila Matos
- 2009–2013: Jesús F. Méndez
- 2013–2017: Melba Acosta Febo
- 2017–2018: Raúl Maldonado
- 2018–2019: Teresita Fuentes
- 2019–present: Francisco Parés Alicea
