= 2024 United States House of Representatives election in Puerto Rico =

- November 5, 2024
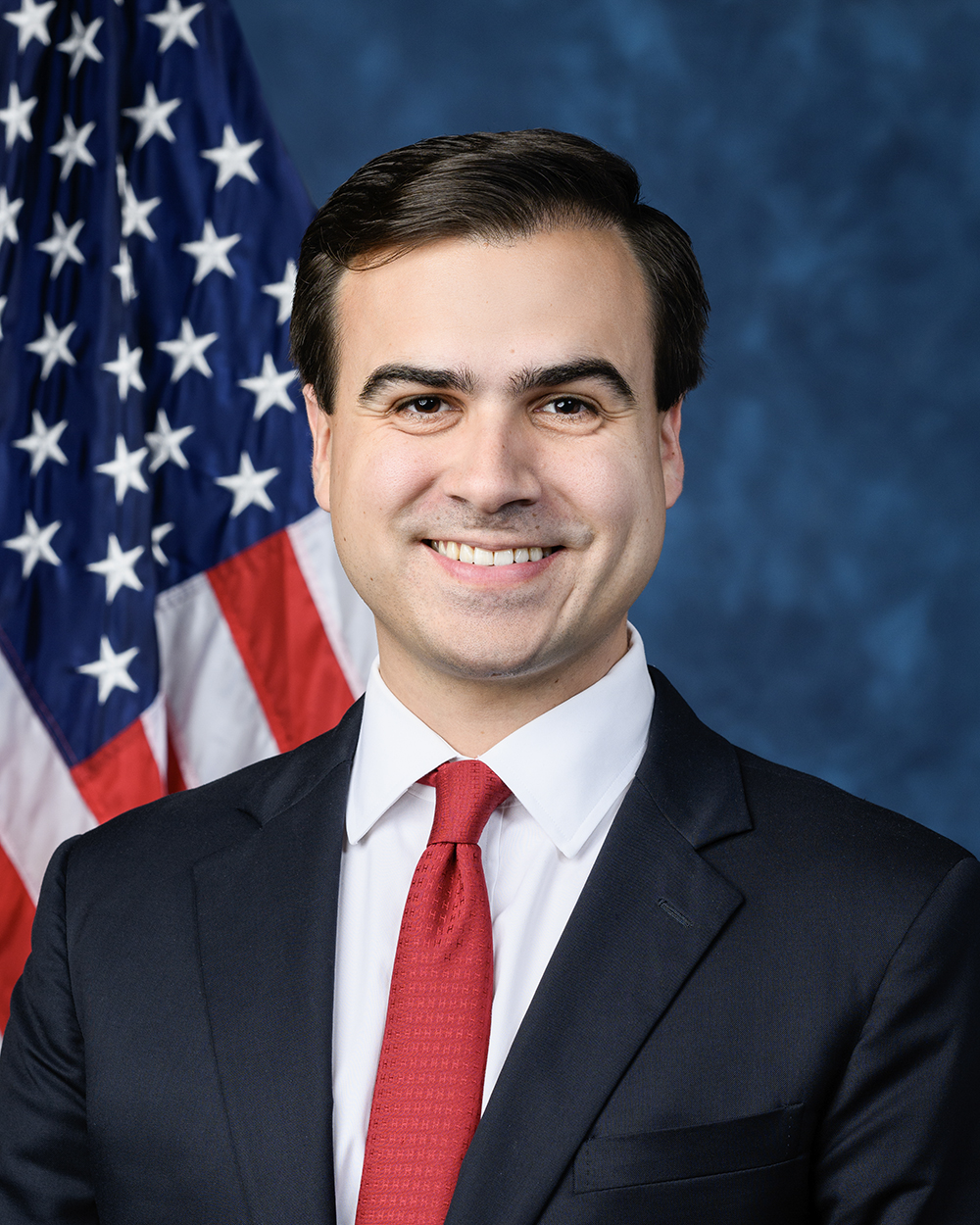

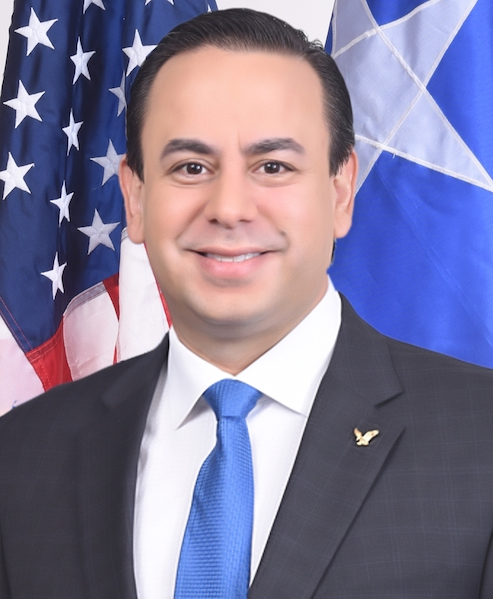

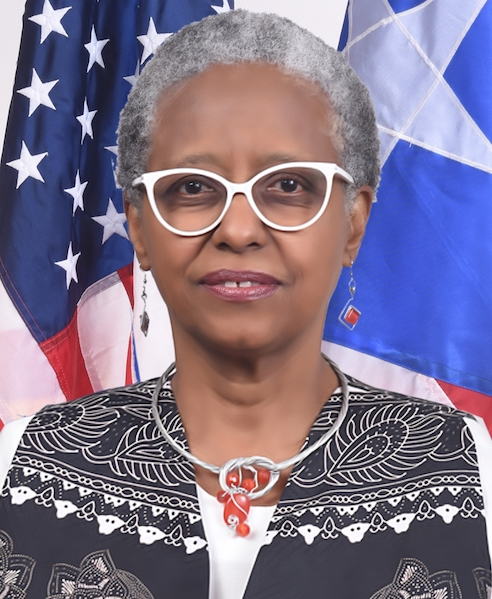
Nominee	Pablo Hernández Rivera	William Villafañe	Ana Irma Rivera Lassén
Party	Popular Democratic	New Progressive	Citizens' Victory
Alliance	Democratic	Republican	Alianza de País
Popular vote	530,540	452,615	115,710
Percentage	43.5%	37.11%	9.49%
- Results by municipality Hernández: 40-50% 50-60% Villafañe: 40–50% 50–60%
Resident Commissioner before election
Jenniffer González
New Progressive
Elected Resident Commissioner
Pablo Hernández Rivera
Popular Democratic

The 2024 United States House of Representatives election in Puerto Rico to elect the Resident Commissioner of Puerto Rico were held on November 5, 2024. The election of the Resident Commissioner was held concurrently with the larger 2024 United States House of Representatives elections, the 2024 Puerto Rico gubernatorial election, and other U.S. federal and Puerto Rican general election races.

The Resident Commissioner of Puerto Rico is the only member of the United States House of Representatives who is elected every four years instead of a two-year term. The incumbent is Jenniffer González, a member of the New Progressive Party (PNP) and the Republican Party, who was re-elected with 41.2% of the vote in 2020. González did not seek re-election in 2024, instead choosing to run for governor.

The Popular Democratic Party of Puerto Rico nominated Pablo Hernández Rivera to seek the Resident Commissioner seat. He formed an exploratory bid in February 2023 but became the official nominee in May. Hernández is a Democrat and the grandson of the former governor of Puerto Rico Rafael Hernández Colón.

The Puerto Rican Independence Party and Citizens' Victory Movement have formed an electoral alliance, with both parties agreeing to support current territorial senator Ana Irma Rivera Lassén; however, all ballot-qualified parties are required to nominate a candidate for governor and Resident Commissioner, so PIP nominated Dr. Roberto Velázquez.

== New Progressive Party primary ==
=== Candidates ===
==== Nominee ====
- William Villafañe, territorial senator

==== Eliminated in primary ====
- Elmer Román, director of mission integration in the Office of the Under Secretary of Defense for Research and Engineering and former Puerto Rico Secretary of State

==== Withdrawn ====
- Marigdalia Ramirez Fort, physician (running as a write-in candidate)
- José Kikito Meléndez, territorial representative

==== Declined ====
- Jenniffer González-Colón, incumbent resident commissioner (endorsed Román, running for governor)
- Luis Dávila Pernas, director of the Puerto Rico Federal Affairs Administration and chair of the Puerto Rico Democratic Party
- José Reyes, former Puerto Rico Adjutant General
- Larry Seilhamer, former Puerto Rico Secretary of State
- Ricardo Rosselló, former governor (endorsed Villafañe)

=== Endorsements ===
Elmer Román

Statewide officials

- Jenniffer González-Colón, Resident Commissioner of Puerto Rico
William Villafañe

Statewide officials

- Ricardo Rosselló, former Governor of Puerto Rico

=== Polling ===
Poll source	Date(s) administered	Sample size (Note: Key: A – all adults RV – registered voters LV – likely voters V – unclear)	Margin of error	Elmer Román	William Villafañe	Other/ undecided
Pasquines	May 22–30, 2024	483 (RV)	?	29%	69%	2%

=== Results ===
New Progressive primary
Party	Candidate	Votes	%
New Progressive	William Villafañe	155,571	54.46
New Progressive	Elmer Román	130,115	45.54
Total votes		285,686	100.00

== Popular Democratic Party nomination ==
=== Nominee ===
- Pablo Hernández Rivera, assistant secretary of federal and international affairs for the Popular Democratic Party and grandson of former governor Rafael Hernández Colón

== Alianza de País (MVC-PIP Alliance) ==
The Puerto Rican Independence Party (PIP) and Citizens' Victory Movement (MVC) have formed an alliance for the 2024 elections. The Independence Party has agreed to support whoever wins the Citizens Victory Movement primary; however, they are still required to nominate a candidate of their own by law.

=== MVC nomination ===
==== Candidates ====
===== Nominee =====
- Ana Irma Rivera Lassén, territorial senator

===== Eliminated in primary =====
- Edgardo Cruz Vélez, retired U.S. Air Force officer

==== Endorsements ====
Ana Irma Rivera Lassén

U.S. representatives

- Chuy García, IL-4 (2019–present) (Democrat)
- Luis Gutiérrez, IL-4 (1993–2019) (Democrat)
- Alexandria Ocasio-Cortez, NY-14 (2019–present) (Democrat)
- Delia Ramirez, IL-3 (2023–present) (Democrat)
- Nydia Velázquez, NY-7 (1993–present) (Democrat)

Territorial legislators

- Juan Dalmau, former at-large territorial senator (Independence)

Political parties

- Puerto Rican Independence Party
- Workers' Socialist Movement

Newspapers

- Momento Crítico

=== PIP nominee ===
- Roberto Velázquez, physician

== Project Dignity nomination ==
=== Nominee ===
- Viviana Ramírez Morales, pastor and human resources professional

== General election ==
=== Debate ===
Dates	Location	Villafañe	Hernández	Lassén	Ramírez	Velázquez	Link
October 7, 2024		Participant	Participant	Participant	Participant		YouTube
October 17, 2024		Participant	Participant	Participant	Participant		YouTube

=== Polling ===
Poll source	Date(s) administered	Sample size	Margin of error	William Villafañe (PNP)	Pablo Hernández (PPD)	Ana Irma Lassén (MVC)	Viviana Ramírez (PD)	Roberto Karlo Velázquez (PIP) (Note: Paper candidate)	Undecided
AtlasIntel	November 1–4, 2024	4,914 (LV)	± 1.0%	34%	41%	16%	5%	1%	3% (Note: "Won't Vote" with 1%)
El Nuevo Día/The Research Office	October 29 – November 1, 2024	1,000 (LV)	—N/a	38%	37%	15%	6%	—N/a	4%
Lit Data PR	October 25 – November 1, 2024	800 (A)	± 3.39%	29%	41%	13%	4%	1%	13%
Lit Data PR	October 25 – November 1, 2024	800 (A)	± 3.39%	31%	43%	15%	8%	3%	—N/a
Pasquines	October 21 – November 1, 2024	(A)	—N/a	34%	38%	17%	8%	1%	2%
Bacon Research	October 25–29, 2024	807 (LV)	± 3.0%	30%	33%	7%	5%	4%	22% (Note: "Won't Vote" with 10%)
Lit Data PR	October 18–25, 2024	800 (A)	± 3.39%	34%	38%	8%	4%	3%	14%
Lit Data PR	October 18–25, 2024	800 (A)	± 3.39%	36%	40%	15%	5%	4%	—N/a
Consultoría Académica e Investigación Social LLC	October 10–22, 2024	784 (V)	—N/a	35%	29%	19%	14%	—N/a	3%
Gaither International (Note: Poll sponsored by El Vocero de Puerto Rico, WAPA-TV, and WKAQ)	October 1–16, 2024	1,109 (LV)	—N/a	29%	35%	12%	5%	3%	16%
Lit Data PR	October 4–11, 2024	800 (A)	± 3.39%	37%	34%	5%	2%	2%	19%
Bacon Research	October 3–10, 2024	807 (LV)	± 3.0%	31%	30%	9%	5%	2%	23% (Note: "Won't Vote" with 12%)
Lit Data PR	September 27 – October 4, 2024	800 (A)	± 3.39%	16%	16%	4%	3%	2%	59%
El Nuevo Día/The Research Office	September 28 – October 2, 2024	(RV)	—N/a	39%	29%	15%	7%	—N/a	10%
Lit Data PR	September 21–27, 2024	800 (A)	—N/a	15%	16%	5%	3%	1%	60%
Lit Data PR	September 5–20, 2024	800 (A)	—N/a	15%	13%	5%	3%	2%	64%
Gaither International	June 23 – July 8, 2024	1,109 (V)	—N/a	33%	22%	11%	6%	4%	25%
AtlasIntel (Note: Poll sponsored by Noticel)	February 15–22, 2024	2,200 (V)	± 2.0%	26%	28%	13%	5%	—N/a	28% (Note: "No Voteria" with 14%)

=== Results ===
2024 Puerto Rico resident commissioner election
Party	Candidate	Votes	%	±%
Popular Democratic	Pablo Hernández Rivera	530,540	43.50%	+11.37%
New Progressive	William Villafañe	452,615	37.11%	−4.03%
Citizens' Victory	Ana Irma Rivera Lassén	115,710	9.49%	−3.16%
Project Dignity	Viviana Ramírez Morales	60,512	4.96%	−2.73%
Independence	Roberto Karlo Velázquez	60,161	4.93%	−1.37%
Total votes		1,219,538	100.00%	-2.13%
Popular Democratic gain from New Progressive				
Democratic gain from Republican				

== Notes ==
Partisan clients
