= Osvaldo Soto García =

Puerto Rican politician

- Education: University of Phoenix (BA); Pontifical Catholic University of Puerto Rico School of Law (JD)
- Employer: Office of the Governor of Puerto Rico
- Political party: New Progressive Party

Osvaldo Soto García was Wanda Vazquez's nominee for Comptroller of Puerto Rico until he asked the governor to retire his nomination in September 2020.

== Biography ==
Between 2006 and 2009, Soto García worked as a reporter for the WKAQ 580 AM radio station. He was Moca's public relations director and its head of the office of recreation and sports between 1996 and 2000. From 2000 to 2008 he was director of news, journalist, and moderator on the WABA 850 AM station in Aguadilla. He holds a degree in marketing from the University of Phoenix in Puerto Rico. Later, he obtained a juris doctor from the Pontifical Catholic University of Puerto Rico School of Law, however he has not passed the bar. Soto García then worked as the Senate Chief of Public Affairs under senate president Thomas Rivera Schatz. He currently functions as Secretary of Public Affairs and Political Affairs at the Fortaleza. According to the Governor's Office, he has led multimillion projects in the private sector and has been a consultant in federally funded projects. He also worked as Auxiliary Administrator of the Work Development Administration of the Department of Labor.

== Comptroller nomination ==
On 15 September 2020, Governor Wanda Vázquez Garced, nominated him to the position of Comptroller of Puerto Rico, in a communication that also stated the nominations of 28 judges, 38 prosecutors and several individuals to other political positions.

=== Criticism ===
There has been a notable opposition to his nomination, especially from the majority New Progressive Party, which controls both houses and the executive branch. The requirements for the job are limited to an age minimum of 30, American citizenship and Puerto Rico residency, but not for the person to be a CPA. Doubts have been cast as to his ability for the ten-year, $129,000 a year salary position of comptroller since he is not a CPA. Both the Speaker of the House of Representatives, Carlos "Johnny" Méndez, and the President of its Health Committee, Juan Oscar Morales, announced publicly that Soto García would face difficulties with his confirmation in that body, since the post requires confirmation by both House and Senate. Morales was opposed since he had done an investigation the previous May related to the buying of tests during the COVID-19 Pandemic, and Soto García, as Secretary of Public Affairs and Political Affairs, "criticized the investigation into possible acts of corruption." Migdalia Padilla, president of the Senate Treasury Committee, stated that she would vote against Soto García. Popular Democratic Party Senator, José Luis Dalmau, stated "I have an excellent opinion with Mr. Osvaldo," however, for Comptroller, "the figure of a CPA has always been sought."

The Senate PNP spokesperson, Carmelo Ríos, stated that he "thought the governor made a mistake in naming him" before the November elections. Ríos further stated that the public opinion holds his nomination as "a political favor", additionally, even if he had worked in the Senate, members of that body might vote differently and they have suggested other political figures such as: Francisco Parés Alicea, Secretary of the Treasury; Manuel Torres, Secretary of the Senate; Edwin García Feliciano, former mayor of Camuy; and Javier Jiménez, mayor of San Sebastián. Speaker of the House, Méndez Núñez later stated he would provide for public hearings to enable Soto García to "convince" him, since when he heard of the nomination he knew that Soto García would not have enough votes for his confirmation. Méndez Núñez would provide for an opinion from the College of Certified Public Accountants of Puerto Rico in the hearings which are set to commence on Monday, September 21. In a radio interview, the president of the college, Rosa M. Rodríguez Ramos, stated that they would "support a CPA" and "could not support him...Osvaldo García Soto."

2020 gubernatorial candidate, Pedro Pierluisi, who defeated governor Wanda Vázquez for the party nomination, rejected the nomination of Soto García and urged the Legislature to "make an exhaustive evaluation of the nominee."

Several former Secretaries of the Treasury used social media to express their oppositions. Juan Zaragoza stated that his "appointment...is another blow to the already battered government institutions." For her part, Teresita Fuentes, suggested and endorsed the present Secretary, Francisco Parés, stating "he is a CPA, Secretary of the Treasury, with experience in a prestigious international firm and academic background in accounting."

=== Response ===
Soto García has defended his nomination by stating that the Comptroller's office needs "a person who would give it a totally different perspective, more investigative." He has also assured that he would bring in more federal funds for the auditors, he is not a CPA, but that the auditors are the ones who work on that area, and that even though he is a member of the New Progressive Party he would "point out whoever and whenever, without distinction of persons."

For her part, Vázquez Garced has stated his nomination is not based on "politics" and other non-CPAs have occupied the post of Comptroller. She rejected the concept that she was "screwing" Soto García into Comptroller so as to leave a legacy in the government. Vázquez Garced affirmed that he possesses "the moral and professional ethics essential to ensure the proper use of our public resources in the three branches of government." She considered several auditors and even Francisco Parés, the present Secretary of the Treasury.
