= 2024 Puerto Rican status referendum =

- November 5, 2024

Results
Statehood	58.61%
Sovereign Free association	29.57%
Independence	11.82%
- Results by municipality Statehood: 60–70% 50–60% 40–50%

A non-binding status referendum was held in Puerto Rico on November 5, 2024 alongside the general elections. This was the seventh referendum held on the long-standing debate about the political status of the archipelago and island, with the previous one having taken place in 2020.

Puerto Rican voters were presented with three choices regarding the political status of Puerto Rico: statehood, independence, and free association. This was the first time that maintaining the island's current status as a United States territory was not an option. This decision was cited by the Popular Democratic Party, the Movimiento Victoria Ciudadana, and the Puerto Rican Independence Party to denounce the referendum and call for either a boycott or for voters to spoil their ballots. However, Puerto Rico's governing New Progressive Party praised the island's vote for statehood.

The option for statehood achieved a majority of the valid vote with 620,782 votes, followed by sovereign free association with 313,259 votes, and independence with 125,171 votes. An additional 204,341 ballots were either blank or invalid. The results for sovereign free association and independence were initially erroneously interchanged before the error was corrected.

== Background ==
In the 2020 Puerto Rican status referendum the option to pursue statehood won the referendum 52.52%–47.48%.

In 2022, the United States House of Representatives passed the Puerto Rico Status Act. It did not pass the United States Senate.

In August 2024, the Puerto Rico Supreme Court dismissed the July 2024 petition by the Puerto Rican Independence Party (PIP) asking the State Election Commission (CEE) to halt the status referendum.

In September 2024, the American Civil Liberties Union (ACLU) filed a lawsuit seeking a preliminary and permanent injunction, as well as a declaratory judgment, allowing potential voters to register, through October 6. On October 1, the High Court of Puerto Rico dismissed the lawsuit filed by the American Civil Liberties Union (ACLU). The Court declines to intervene in Puerto Rico's electoral processes or grant the extraordinary remedy of a preliminary injunction. The American Civil Liberties Union (ACLU) has failed to demonstrate that the September 21 voter registration deadline constitutes an unconstitutional disenfranchisement, or a manifest injustice, that justifies the intrusion of the United States federal government, into the election administration of Puerto Rico.

On November 21, 2024, former Speaker of the House of Representatives of Puerto Rico, José Aponte, asked the State Electoral Commission (CEE), to count all the ballots of the plebiscite on the status, that were not counted on the day of the general election, including the ones voted by mail. The Popular Democratic Party (PPD) warns of going to court if the State Electoral Commission (CEE) decides to recount the plebiscite vote on the status of Puerto Rico.

In December 2024, the representative by accumulation, José Pérez Cordero, goes to the United States Congress to promote the results of the consultation on the status, where the quality of state prevailed with a majority of 57 percent of the votes.

The results for the options of sovereign free association and independence were initially erroneously interchanged by Dominion Voting Systems machines. On December 27, 2024, the Puerto Rico Department of Justice received a complaint regarding allegations of irregularities in the results of the plebiscite, the Department of Justice is seizing the complaint, to determine the opening of an investigation into the irregularities, during the plebiscite.

== Campaign ==
New Progressive Party (PNP) gubernatorial candidate Jenniffer González-Colón called a blank vote a "wasted vote" emphasizing the importance of the vote. The pro-statehood Republican Party of Puerto Rico supported the referendum.

The Popular Democratic Party called for a blank vote for not including Commonwealth or the current system. Gubernatorial candidate of Proyecto Dignidad Javier Jiménez announced that he will not vote but granted their members free vote. Movimiento Victoria Ciudadana called to "damage" their referendum and presidential ballots and their resident commissioner candidate Ana Irma Rivera Lassén announced that she will write "Get out LUMA" on both. The Puerto Rican Independence Party (PIP) denounced the referendum as "unconstitutional and illegal" and "a desperate act by the PNP leadership".

== Question ==
Sample ballot for the 2024 Puerto Rican status referendum

The referendum featured three choices in the following order, as labeled in the ballots (which were bilingual Spanish and English): "Sovereignty in Free Association with the United States"; "Statehood"; and "Independence." The English-language description for "Sovereignty in Free Association with the United States" read as follows:

1. Puerto Rico is a sovereign nation that has full authority and responsibility over its territory and population under a constitution of its own adoption which shall be the supreme law of the nation.
2. Puerto Rico is vested with full powers and responsibilities consistent with the rights and responsibilities that devolve upon a sovereign nation under international law, including its own fiscal and monetary policy, immigration, trade, and the conduct in its own name and right of relations with other nations and international organizations, except as otherwise provided for in the Articles of Free Association to be negotiated by Puerto Rico and the United States.
3. Puerto Rico has full authority and responsibility over its citizenship and immigration laws, and persons who have United States citizenship have a right to retain United States nationality and citizenship for life by entitlement or election as provided by Federal law.
4. Birth in Puerto Rico shall cease to be a basis for United States nationality or citizenship. Individuals born in Puerto Rico to at least one parent who is a citizen of the United States shall be United States citizens at birth, consistent with the immigration laws of the United States, for the duration of the first agreement of the Articles of Free Association.
5. Puerto Rico enters into Articles of Free Association with the United States, with such devolution and reservation of governmental functions and other bilateral arrangements as may be agreed to by both Parties under the Articles, which shall be terminable at will by either the United States or Puerto Rico at any time.
6. Puerto Rico will no longer be a possession of the United States for purposes of the Internal Revenue Code. In general, United States citizens and United States businesses in the nation of Puerto Rico will be subject to United States Federal tax laws (as is the case with any other United States citizen or United States business abroad) and to Puerto Rican tax laws. Puerto Rico's status as an independent, sovereign nation will be the controlling factor in the taxation of Puerto Rican taxpayers. In addition, Puerto Rico will enter into an agreement with the United States to provide for "Sovereignty in Free Association" between the two nations. This agreement may modify the otherwise applicable tax rules, subject to negotiation and ratification by the two nations.
7. The Constitution of the United States no longer applies in Puerto Rico, the laws of the United States no longer apply in Puerto Rico except as otherwise provided in the Articles of Free Association, and United States sovereignty in Puerto Rico is ended.
8. All matters pertaining to the government-to-government relationship between Puerto Rico and the United States, which may include foreign affairs, trade, finance, taxation, currency, economic assistance, security and defense, dispute resolution and termination, shall be provided for in the Articles of Free Association.

The option labeled "Statehood" read as follows:

1. The State of Puerto Rico is admitted into the Union on an equal footing with the other States in all respects whatever and is a part of the permanent union of the United States of America, subject to the United States Constitution, with powers not prohibited by the Constitution to the States and reserved to the State of Puerto Rico or to its residents.
2. The residents of Puerto Rico are fully self-governing with their rights secured under the United States Constitution, which shall be fully applicable in Puerto Rico and which, with the laws and treaties of the United States, is the supreme law and has the same force and effect in Puerto Rico as in the other States of the Union.
3. United States citizenship of those born in Puerto Rico is recognized, protected, and secured under the United States Constitution in the same way such citizenship is for all United States citizens born in the other States.
4. Puerto Rico will no longer be a possession of the United States for purposes of the Internal Revenue Code. Instead, the State of Puerto Rico will become a State on equal footing with each of the current 50 States in the United States of America. Individuals and businesses resident in the State of Puerto Rico will be subject to United States Federal tax laws as well as applicable State tax laws.

The option labeled "Independence" read as follows:

1. Puerto Rico is a sovereign nation that has full authority and responsibility over its territory and population under a constitution of its own adoption which shall be the supreme law of the nation.
2. Puerto Rico is vested with full powers and responsibilities consistent with the rights and responsibilities that devolve upon a sovereign nation under international law, including its own fiscal and monetary policy, immigration, trade, and the conduct in its own name and right of relations with other nations and international organizations.
3. Puerto Rico has full authority and responsibility over its citizenship and immigration laws, and birth in Puerto Rico or relationship to persons with statutory United States citizenship by birth in the former territory shall cease to be a basis for United States nationality or citizenship, except that persons who have such United States citizenship have a right to retain United States nationality and citizenship for life, by entitlement or election as provided by Federal law.
4. Puerto Rico will no longer be a possession of the United States for purposes of the Internal Revenue Code. In general, United States citizens and United States businesses in the nation of Puerto Rico will be subject to United States Federal tax laws (as is the case with any other United States citizen or United States business abroad) and to Puerto Rican tax laws. Puerto Rico's status as an independent, sovereign nation will be the controlling factor in the taxation of Puerto Rican taxpayers.
5. The Constitution and laws of the United States no longer apply in Puerto Rico and United States sovereignty in Puerto Rico is ended.

It was the first time the island's current status as a U.S. territory was not an option. Note that free association was an option on some older referendums also, and the structure of voting options has varied over time.

== Opinion polls ==
Poll source	Date(s) administered	Sample size (Note: Key: A – all adults RV – registered voters LV – likely voters V – unclear)	Margin of error	Statehood	Sovereign free association	Independence	Other/undecided
El Nuevo Día	October 2024	—	—	44%	25%	19%	12% (Note: Blank ballot with 8%, undecided with 3%, would not vote with 1%)
Gaither International	12 July–1 August 2024	1,138 (A)	—	45%	23%	11%	21%
AtlasIntel	15–22 February 2024	2,200 (V)	± 2.0%	47.2%	23.3%	11.4%	18.1%

== Results ==
According to the Puerto Rico State Commission on Elections (CEE), 58.6% voted for statehood, 29.6% for free association, and 11.8% for independence. The commission certified these results as the final and official of the plebiscite on January 17, 2025.

The results for the options of sovereign free association and independence were initially erroneously interchanged by Dominion Voting Systems machines.

Choice	Votes	%
Statehood	620,782	58.61
Free Association	313,259	29.57
Independence	125,171	11.82
Total	1,059,212	100.00
Valid votes	1,059,212	83.83
Invalid votes	23,141	1.83
Blank votes	181,200	14.34
Total votes	1,263,553	100.00
Registered voters/turnout	1,987,317	63.58
Source: CEEPUR CEEPUR

== See also ==
- 2024 United States ballot measures
