= Stalking horse =

Figure used to test an idea for a third party

A stalking horse is a figure used to test a concept or mount a challenge on behalf of a third party. If the idea proves viable or popular, the third party can then declare its interest and advance the concept with little risk of failure. If the concept fails, the third party will not be tainted by association with the failed concept and can either drop the idea completely or bide its time and wait until a better moment to launch an attack. The relationship between the stalking horse and third party is usually, but not always, hidden from the public. In many cases, the scheme is one-sided, with only one party aware of the arrangement.

In hunting, it refers to a horse, or a model of a horse, behind which a hunter hides when stalking game.

== Origin ==
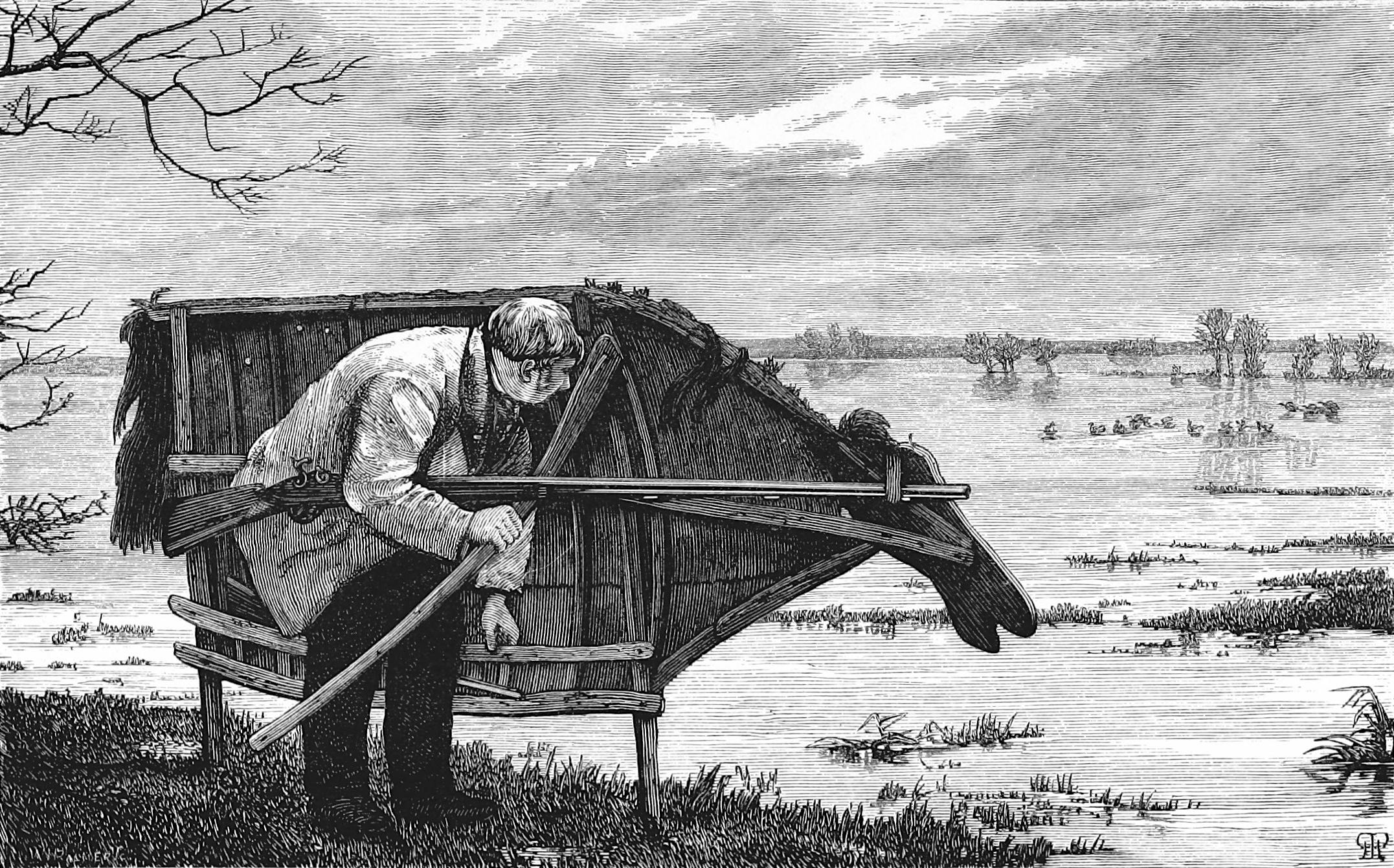
"Approaching the fowl with stalking-horse", an 1875 illustration of a cut-out horse shape used in hunting

The term stalking horse originally derived from the practice of hunting, particularly of wildfowl. Hunters noticed that many birds would flee immediately on the approach of humans, but would tolerate the close presence of animals such as horses and cattle. Hunters would therefore slowly approach their quarry by walking alongside their horses, keeping their upper bodies out of sight until the flock was within firing range. Animals trained for this purpose were called stalking horses. Sometimes mobile hides are used for a similar purpose.

An example of the practice figures in the 1972 film Jeremiah Johnson, when Johnson and Chris Lapp ("Bear Claw") are hunting elk in the Rockies:

Jeremiah: Wind's right, but he'll just run soon as we step out of these trees.
Bear Claw: Trick to it. Walk out on this side of your horse.
Jeremiah: What if he sees our feet?
Bear Claw: Elk don't know how many feet a horse have!

== Usage ==
The term first appeared in English-language newspapers in the late 18th century. It was used to describe the Protestant branch of Christianity as "a stalking horse to power" in Ireland in 1785. Early examples of its use in a political context occurred in the London newspaper The Observer in 1796, the Connecticut Courant in the US in 1808 and in the Sydney Gazette in Australia in 1822.

The expression is generally used in politics and business. In politics, the circumstances may include an attempt to bring down a powerful leader, usually by members of their own party. They may also include the presentation of a bill by a minor party representative, who is also acting in the interests of a silent partner such as a larger, more risk-averse, political party. In business, the circumstances are an attempt at testing the market for a potential (hostile) takeover of a business. In each case, there is a clear understanding that the anonymous party, whether a company or an individual, has a valuable reputation that could be damaged by the failure. The stalking horse is an exercise in assessing accurately the degree of risk so that a full-blooded challenge is only mounted by the main party when there is a real likelihood of success.

The loser in the exercise appears to be the stalking horse. If the idea is viable or popular, the stalking horse person will be sidelined and the anonymous figure will take over the concept. If the concept proves unpopular, the stalking horse will suffer a negative reaction. The understanding is that the anonymous party is a major player, perhaps only a little weaker than the target itself, and the stalking horse is a minor figure who has little or no reputation to lose. The anonymous figure is not sufficiently powerful or does not have sufficient confidence in that power, to risk a direct attack first off, and the stalking horse is a form of distraction tactic to enable better positioning.

In politics, the stalking horse figure can expect patronage from the senior figure they are assisting. In business, an associated company that acts as a stalking horse may be given a share in the contracts or the market share that will result from the demise of the business rival. The loyalty in volunteering, or agreeing to be "volunteered", will ensure that their name becomes known to those with power and should guarantee help in advancing their interests. As a weaker player, they can afford to wait a while for the due reward.

Alternatively, the "horse" may be acting in a more altruistic and self-sacrificial manner, knowing that there is no possibility of realistic reward from the third party for the exercise, and instead being motivated by duty or loyalty to do so for the greater good of the party, organization, or cause to which they both belong. In this case, the "horse" will probably not be a young person hoping for advancement, but an older figure at the end of their career, who volunteers as a gesture of gratitude for all the benefits they believe the cause has given them, or as a chance to go out in a blaze of glory.

In the event of failure, the anonymous party is seen as being sufficiently powerful to protect the "horse" from any real retribution on the part of the target, particularly since the anonymity will allow the third party to step in and pretend to be an honest broker between the "horse" and the target. This is a further opportunity to enhance the reputation of the third party and boost their status at the expense of the target. If the exercise is viable, the third party gains power immediately, but even if it fails it engineers an opportunity to resolve a stalemate and enhance the contender's reputation, so that ultimate success is another step nearer, to the benefit of both the third party and the "horse", who expects to slipstream in its wake.

== Examples ==
=== In politics ===
The phenomenon occurs particularly in politics, where a junior politician acts as the stalking horse to promote the interests of a senior politician, who remains unseen in case the actions would be damaging but nevertheless wants to provoke a debate or challenge to a party colleague. In some cases, stalking horses are not working for a particular individual but may wish to provoke a response that leads others to join in. In politics, the truth about the relationship between an individual stalking horse and a candidate may never be known, as both sides may claim that the (alleged) stalking horse acted without the agreement of anyone else.

For example, in Britain, the elderly and largely unknown back-bench politician Anthony Meyer challenged and helped to bring about the eventual resignation of Margaret Thatcher in the Conservative Party leadership.

In American politics, George W. Romney believed that Nelson Rockefeller had used him as a stalking horse in the 1968 Republican Party presidential primaries by promising support, then not providing it and hinting at his own entry into the campaign.

Alan Keyes' entry into the 1996 Republican Party presidential primaries after Pat Buchanan had secured victories in New Hampshire and Louisiana led many to believe that Keyes was a stalking horse for neoconservative elements in the Republican Party, since Buchanan had been a well-known ardent foe of abortion and had suffered political fallout for bringing abortion and "cultural war" to the center of the public policy debate.

=== In bankruptcy ===
In bankruptcy, a stalking horse bid is a first, favorable bid solicited by the bankrupt company's creditors strategically to prevent low-ball offers.

== See also ==
- Dark horse
- Dummy candidate
- Scapegoat
- Fall guy
- Hunting blind
- Paper candidate
- Placeholder (politics)
- Plausible deniability
- Sacrificial lamb
- Straw man (law)
- Trial balloon
