= Jesús F. Méndez =

Puerto Rican politician

Jesús F. Méndez-Rodríguez was the Secretary of Treasury of Puerto Rico from 2011 to 2012. Nominated by Governor Luis Fortuño to a recess appointment in January, 2011, when his predecessor, Juan Carlos Puig, was appointed to become the first Inspector General of Puerto Rico, he was subsequently confirmed by the Senate of Puerto Rico and sworn in by Secretary of State Kenneth McClintock. Within three days of his swearing in, he began a rare two-day term as acting governor when Fortuño, as well as the next two officers that precede the Secretary of the Treasury in the line of gubernatorial succession, McClintock and Attorney General Guillermo Somoza, were simultaneously in Washington, D.C.

Méndez, a Certified Public Accountant and a University of Puerto Rico graduate, previously served as executive vice president of the Government Development Bank of Puerto Rico, as well as executive director of the Public Buildings Authority of Puerto Rico, a public corporation that builds, maintains and leases public buildings and many school facilities in Puerto Rico.

The new Treasury Secretary's agenda includes the implementation of the tax reform incorporated in Puerto Rico's new Internal Revenue Code (Law 1 of 2011) and rolling out IVU Lotto, a new free lottery designed to increase sales tax revenues by at least 50%.
