= Rosa Emilia Rodríguez =

Puerto Rican lawyer and federal prosecutor

Rosa Emilia Rodríguez-Vélez
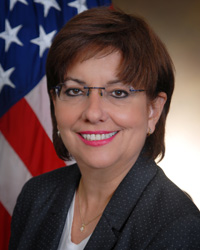

United States Attorney for the District of Puerto Rico
- In office October 13, 2007 – October 4, 2019
- President: George W. Bush; Barack Obama; Donald Trump
- Succeeded by: W. Stephen Muldrow

Personal details
- Education: Interamerican University of Puerto Rico (MCJ); Interamerican University of Puerto Rico (JD)

Rosa Emilia Rodríguez-Vélez is an American lawyer who served as the United States attorney for the District of Puerto Rico from 2007 to 2019. She is a career prosecutor, starting in the Puerto Rico Department of Justice and subsequently in the U.S. Attorney's office in San Juan.

== Education and early career ==
Rodríguez-Vélez holds a master's degree in criminal justice (1974) and a Juris Doctor Degree (1977) from the Interamerican University of Puerto Rico School of Law. She is a member of Eta Gamma Delta sorority.

She was appointed by Governor Carlos Romero Barceló as a local district attorney for the Puerto Rico Department of Justice in 1979. She subsequently crossed over to the federal level, serving in different prosecution and managerial roles within the United States Attorney's office.

== U.S. attorney for District of Puerto Rico ==
She was appointed United States attorney for the District of Puerto Rico by the Attorney General of the United States in June 2006 and nominated by President George W. Bush in January 2007. On October 13, 2007, the judges of the United States District Court for the District of Puerto Rico unanimously authorized Chief Judge José A. Fusté to extend her appointment for four years, until October 12, 2011. On October 13, 2011, after no other U.S. president nominated her again, she was sworn into a second term by Chief Judge Aida Delgado. Her appointments were never confirmed by the United States Senate. Her term as U.S. attorney ended on November 30, 2019, when she retired after 31 years of service in the United States Department of Justice.

== Prominent cases ==
In October 2010, she stood beside Attorney General Eric Holder at the Justice Department headquarters as he announced the arrest of 89 police officers and 44 other people in Puerto Rico for facilitating drug deals in Operation Guard Shack, in what has been described as the largest law enforcement corruption probe in FBI history.

== See also ==
- United States Department of Justice
- Puerto Rico Department of Justice
- List of Puerto Ricans
- History of women in Puerto Rico
