= Eta Gamma Delta =

Puerto Rican sorority

- ΗΓΔ
- Founded: 1928; 98 years ago University of Puerto Rico
- Type: Social
- Affiliation: CIPR
- Status: Active
- Scope: National
- Motto: Semper Fidelis
- Colors: Purple and Gold
- Chapters: 4 collegiate, 8 alumnae
- Nickname: la Eta
- Headquarters: San Juan, Puerto Rico; United States

Eta Gamma Delta (ΗΓΔ) is a Puerto Rican sorority. It was established in 1928 at the University of Puerto Rico Rio Piedras. The sorority has expanded to include five collegiate chapters and eight alumnae chapters. It is a member of Concilio Interfraternitario de Puerto Rico.

== History ==
In March 1928 a group of young ladies enrolled in the University of Puerto Rico at Rio Piedras founded Eta Gamma Delta Sorority. Its first president was Margarita Ortiz Toro. During the presidency of Beatriz del Toro in 1929, the sorority was recognized by university authorities. By 1932, an alumnus chapter called "Capitulo Pasivo" was organized in San Juan during the presidency of Conchita Santana Campos.

In 1940, on the (Colegio de Agricultura y Artes Mecanicas) now the University of Puerto Rico at Mayagüez Gilda Cernuda, Socorro Gaztambide, Aida Gauthier, Iris Ramírez, Catín Rllán, Doris Pérez, and others founded Delta Phi Omega sorority, it was the first sorority at the campus. On April 14, 1941, the then-president of the Alpha chapter of Eta Gamma Delta, Annie Bonar, invited this new group to join Eta Gamma Delta as its Beta chapter. After several meetings and visits by the Eta sisters, all the Delta Phi Omega sisters took the formal initiation and became part of the Eta Gamma Delta.

In 1943, the Alumni chapter at Mayagüez was established, calling itself the Zona Beta. Their first president was Virginia Ramírez. It was then that the need for a central governing body became apparent. In 1944, the first Directiva General or central office was established, with Eleonor Lawton as its first president.

In March 1946, the ladies of Delta Omega Mu, a local sorority met with Eta Gamma Delta member Sarah Torres Peralta. Their visit was to discuss with her the idea of Eta Gamma Delta establishing its Gamma chapter in the Interamerican University at San Germán where Delta Omega Mu was located. After several meetings and discussions, the ladies of Delta Omega Mu and others of the Beta chapter at Mayagüez who studied at the Interamerican became the Gamma chapter of Eta Gamma Delta. Their first chapter president was Rosarito Armstrong.

In 1949, the Delta chapter was founded by the Catholic University at Ponce. Its first chapter president was Rosarito Armstrong, the same sister who had been the first president of Gamma chapter. In 1955 an alumnus chapter - Zona - was founded at Ponce; its first president was Práxes Torres de García. In 1960 the Zeta chapter was established at the University of Sagrado Corazon. By February 1990 the Kappa Zona was established in Arecibo. In 1991 on an annual convention the Kappa chapter was re-instated. In 2007, Zone Omega was established in Orlando, Florida. Most recently Zone Tau was established in 2015 in Tampa, Florida.

== Symbols ==
Eta Gamma Delta's motto is Semper Fidelis. Its nickname is la Eta. Its colors are purple and gold. Its nickname is la Eta.

== Chapters ==
=== Collegiate chapters ===
Undergraduate chapters are given a Greek-letter name, followed by the appellation, "Activo", noting they are chapters for active members. In the following list, active chapters are indicated in bold and inactive chapters are in italics.

Chapter	Charter date and range	Institution	Location	Status	Ref.
**Alpha**	March 1928	University of Puerto Rico, Rio Piedras Campus	Rio Piedras, Puerto Rico	Active	
**Beta**	1941	University of Puerto Rico at Mayagüez	Mayagüez, Puerto Rico	Active	(Note: Chapter formed from Delta Phi Omega (local), established in 1940.)
**Gamma**	1946	Inter American University of Puerto Rico—San German	San Germán, Puerto Rico	Active	(Note: Chapter formed from Delta Omega Mu (local).)
**Delta**	1949	Pontifical Catholic University of Puerto Rico	Ponce, Puerto Rico	Active	
Zeta	1960	Universidad del Sagrado Corazón	Santurce, San Juan, Puerto Rico	Inactive	
Kappa	1963	Inter American University of Puerto Rico—Arecibo	Arecibo, Puerto Rico	Inactive	

=== Alumni chapters ===
Alumni chapters are given a Greek-letter name, with the appellation, "Zona". In the following list, active chapters are indicated in bold and inactive chapters are in italics.

Chapter	Charter date and range	Location	Status	Ref.
Zona Alpha	1932	San Juan, Puerto Rico	Active	(Note: This chapter was originally called Capitulo Pasivo.)
Zona Beta	1943	Mayagüez, Puerto Rico	Active	
Zona Delta	1955	Ponce, Puerto Rico	Active	
Zona Gamma	1966	San Germán, Puerto Rico	Active	
Zona Epsilon	1970	Yauco, Puerto Rico	Active	
Zona Kappa	1963	Arecibo, Puerto Rico	Active	
Zona Tau	2015	Tampa, Florida	Active	
Zona Omega	2007	Orlando, Florida	Active	

== Notable members ==
- Carmen Ana Culpeper, Secretary of the Puerto Rico Department of the Treasury
- Rosa Emilia Rodríguez, lawyer and federal prosecutor
- Margarita Fernández Zavala, House of Representatives of Puerto Rico

== See also ==
- Concilio Interfraternitario Puertorriqueño de la Florida
- Puerto Rican fraternities and sororities
- List of social sororities and women's fraternities
