= Dummy candidate =

Someone who stands for election with no intention of winning

A dummy candidate is a candidate who stands for election, usually with no intention or realistic chance of winning. This differs from a paper candidate, which likewise runs with no likelihood of victory, in that the dummy candidate usually has some ulterior motive for being in the race that influences the outcome of the election dishonestly.

== Purposes ==
A dummy candidate can serve any of the following purposes:

- Dummy candidates can give elections, where genuine political opposition are repressed or prevented from participating, a superficial appearance of democratic legitimacy by presenting more candidates than just the incumbent on the ballot.
- In instant-runoff voting, a dummy candidate may direct preferences to other candidates in order to increase the serious candidate's share of the vote.
- A dummy candidate may be used by a serious candidate to overcome limits on advertising or campaign financing. For example, in India, there have been cases of serious candidates fielding multiple dummy candidates to distribute their poll expenses. The expenses are directed towards the campaign of the serious candidate, but shown to the election commission under the dummy candidates' names.
- A political party may field a dummy candidate with a name like that of a more established candidate to confuse voters and cut that candidate's vote share. The dummy candidate's name also may be deceptively similar to that of a retiring incumbent, a former candidate or officeholder, or even a deceased former candidate or officeholder. (The film The Distinguished Gentleman starring Eddie Murphy was somewhat based on this premise.)
  - For example, in the 2014 Indian general elections, there were seven candidates named Chandu Lal Sahu and another four named Chandu Ram Sahu in the Mahasamund. The serious candidate, Chandu Lal Sahu of the Bharatiya Janata Party, received 503,514 votes, but he won by just 1,217 votes. The dummy candidates received the votes intended for him, with one of them finishing third in the constituency. To solve this problem, the Election Commission of India is designing Electronic Voting Machines with candidates' photographs.
  - In the 1982 Glasgow Hillhead by-election, minor candidate Douglas Parkin changed his name to "Roy Harold Jenkins" to confuse voters looking for Roy H. Jenkins. Both Jenkins styled themselves as candidates of the Social Democratic Party: the original Jenkins, a former Labour politician, had been a founder of a sizable party formed in 1981 while the other Jenkins stood for a minor party formed in 1979. In a contest of eight candidates, Jenkins from the 1981 SDP returned to Parliament, flipping the constituency from the Conservatives; the other Jenkins came third last with 282 votes.
  - In the 2019 Canadian federal election, the satirical Rhinoceros Party nominated a 42-year-old delivery man named Maxime Bernier to run against thirteen-year incumbent Member of Parliament, Maxime Bernier of the People's Party of Canada, in the riding of Beauce. The Rhinoceros' Bernier received 1,072 votes, placing last out of seven candidates, but receiving the most votes out of any candidate from the Rhinoceros Party. The People's Party Bernier lost to Richard Lehoux of the Conservative Party of Canada, the latter being the party for which MP Bernier had served from 2006 until 2018, the same year he founded the People's Party.
  - In the 2024 Romanian parliamentary election, the new and previously unknown United Social Democratic Party (PSDU) chose an extremely similar electoral symbol to that of the country's largest party, the Social Democratic Party (PSD). The party obtained almost 2% of the vote nationwide, more than certain established parties such as REPER.
  - In the 2026 United States Senate election in Alaska, incumbent Republican Senator Dan Sullivan faced a challenge from a political novice also named Dan Sullivan, with the two having different middle names. Alaska uses a jungle primary system in which the top four vote-getters in the August election move on to a runoff in November, leading to the possibility of both Dan Sullivans qualifying for the November ballot, which led to state and federal investigations into whether the novice Sullivan was a dummy candidate. The novice Sullivan denied any links to Sullivan's Democratic rival for the seat. The state board of elections distinguished the two candidates by expressly identifying the incumbent Sullivan as the incumbent on the ballot. In an unusual coincidence, yet another Dan Sullivan, the mayor of Anchorage, had previously sought Alaska's other Senate seat in 2016 to serve alongside the current incumbent Sullivan but withdrew from the race under unexplained circumstances.
- A dummy candidate may serve as a placeholder for a party in a primary and then withdraw after winning the primary, allowing the leadership of the party an opportunity to nominate the candidate they really desire to fill their line for the general election.
- Dummy candidates can also result from candidates withdrawing from a particular race, but being unable to pull their name off the ballot, remaining listed as a choice.

== See also ==
- Perennial candidate
- Paper candidate
- Placeholder (politics)
- Stalking horse
