= Carmen Ana Culpeper =

Former Secretary of the Puerto Rico Department of the Treasury

Secretary of Treasury of Puerto Rico
- In office 1981–1984
- Governor: Carlos Romero Barceló
- Preceded by: Julio César Pérez
- Succeeded by: Juan Agosto Alicea

Personal details
- Born: May 21, 1945 (age 79); Santurce, Puerto Rico
- Education: University of Puerto Rico (BBA); Wharton School (MBA)

Carmen Ana Culpeper-Ramírez served as the first female Secretary of the Puerto Rico Department of the Treasury during the administration of Governor Carlos Romero Barceló. During the governorship of Pedro Rosselló, she served as the president of the then government-owned Puerto Rico Telephone Company.

Born on May 21, 1945 in Santurce, Puerto Rico, she holds a BBA in Finance from the University of Puerto Rico and an MBA from the Wharton School of the University of Pennsylvania.

In addition to serving as Regional Director of the United States Small Business Administration, she served as a member of the Board of Directors of Centennial Corporation and of Banco Santander Puerto Rico.

She currently works as a financial consultant. She is a member of Eta Gamma Delta sorority.

== See also ==
- List of Puerto Ricans
- History of women in Puerto Rico
