= Rafael Picó Santiago =

Geographer, educator, politician, senator of Puerto Rico

Member of the Puerto Rico Senate from the At Large district
- In office 1965–1968

President of the Puerto Rico Government Development Bank
- In office 1958–1964

Secretary of Treasury of Puerto Rico
- In office 1955–1958

Personal details
- Born: December 29, 1912 Coamo, Puerto Rico
- Died: May 4, 1998 (aged 85) San Juan, Puerto Rico
- Party: Popular Democratic Party (PPD)
- Education: University of Puerto Rico (BA); Clark University (MA, PhD)
- Occupation: Politician, Senator, Geographer, Educator

Rafael Picó Santiago (December 29, 1912 – May 4, 1998) was one of Governor Luis Muñoz Marín's closest advisors. He served as the first chairman of the Puerto Rico Planning Board, President of the Government Development Bank for Puerto Rico, and served from 1965 to 1968 as a member of the Puerto Rico Senate elected by Muñoz' Popular Democratic Party (PDP).

Born in 1912 in Coamo, Puerto Rico, he studied geography at the University of Puerto Rico, and ended his bachelor's degree with honors in 1932. In 1934, obtained his master's degree in arts and in 1938, his doctorate, both at Clark University in Worcester, Massachusetts, as well as a doctorate in laws honoris causa in 1962.

In addition to serving as a professor of geography at the University of Puerto Rico's Río Piedras main campus, he lectured on the subject at Harvard, Antioch, Western Michigan, Eastern Michigan and Miami universities.

The islands' first pro-statehood governor, Don Luis A. Ferré and President Richard M. Nixon, in 1970 created a joint United States-Puerto Rico Ad Hoc Committee to study the possibility of granting Puerto Ricans the right to vote for President as a means of building upon Puerto Rico's territorial relationship with the United States. They appointed pro-status quo PDP member Rafael Picó to co-chair the Ad Hoc Committee.

Picó Santiago was always considered to be one of the more pro-American members of the PDP.

Picó died on May 4, 1998. Among other family members, he was survived by his daughter Isabell, an attorney married to Federico Hernández Denton, who subsequently retired as Chief Justice of the Puerto Rico Supreme Court. The family donated his papers to the University of Puerto Rico's Graduate School of Planning in 2015.

== Works ==
- The Geographic Regions of Puerto Rico, Rafael Picó, 1950, OCLC number 1649057
- Nueva geografía de Puerto Rico: física, económica, y social por Rafael Picó. Con la colaboración de Zayda Buitrago de Santiago y Héctor H. Berrios.
- The geography of Puerto Rico.

Political offices
Preceded by Sol Luis Descartes	Secretary of Treasury of Puerto Rico; 1955–1958	Succeeded by José R. Nogueras
