= W. Stephen Muldrow =

American lawyer (born 1964)

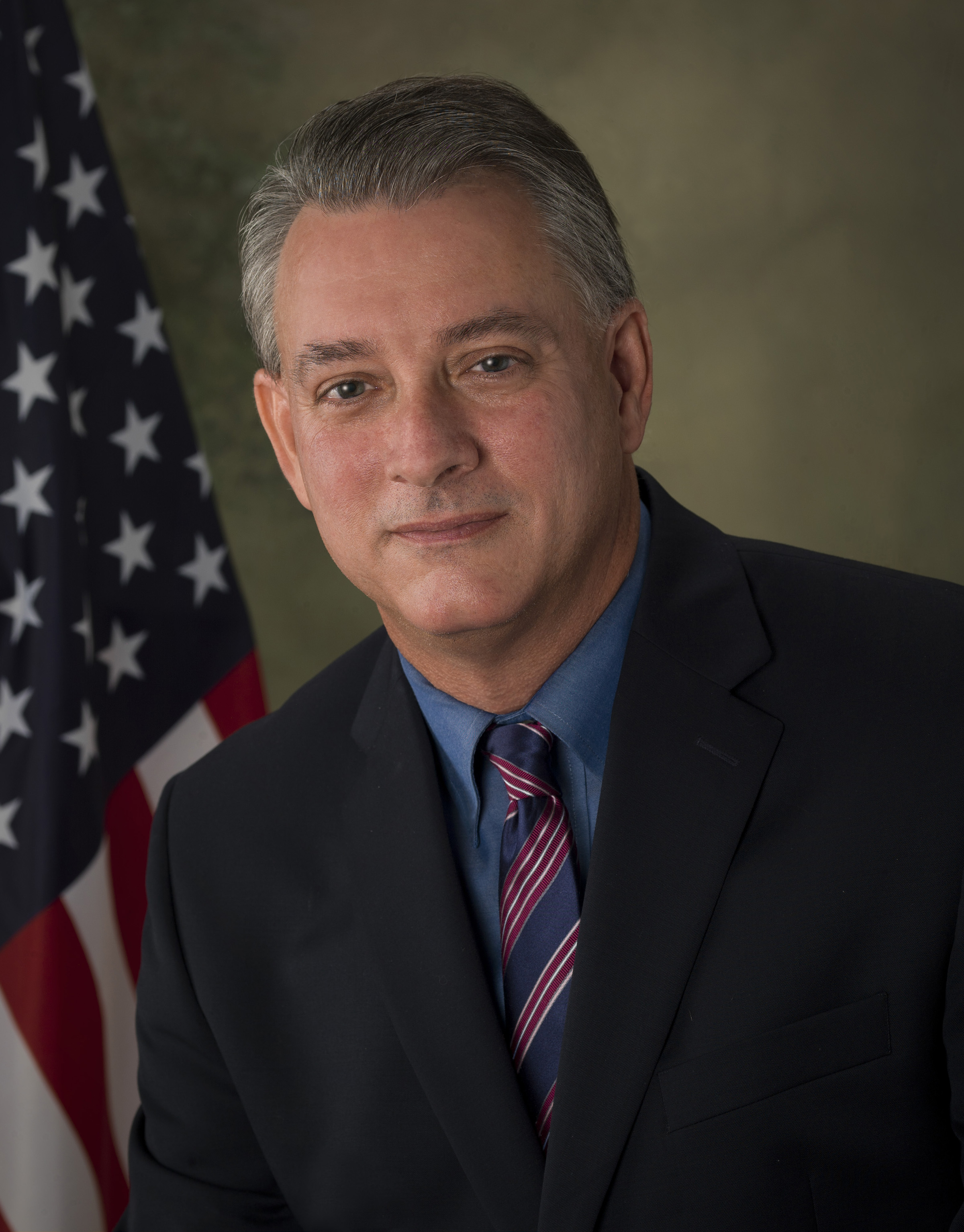

United States Attorney for the District of Puerto Rico
- In office October 4, 2019 – July 7, 2026
- President: Donald Trump; Joe Biden; Donald Trump
- Preceded by: Rosa Emilia Rodríguez

Personal details
- Born: William Stephen Muldrow; June 15, 1964 (age 62)
- Education: Bucknell University (BA); American University (MA, JD)

William Stephen Muldrow (born June 15, 1964) is an American lawyer who had served as the United States attorney for the United States District Court for the District of Puerto Rico. He was previously an assistant United States attorney for the Middle District of Florida.

== Education ==
Muldrow earned his Bachelor of Arts from Bucknell University, his Master of Arts from the American University School of International Service and his Juris Doctor, cum laude, from American University Washington College of Law.

== Career ==
Muldrow previously served as an Assistant United States attorney in the District of Puerto Rico for six years. His prosecutorial career focused on drug trafficking offenses, money laundering, and violent crimes. He began his Department of Justice service as a Trial Attorney in the Tax Division.

Prior to becoming United States Attorney for Puerto Rico, he served as an assistant United States attorney in the Middle District of Florida, having previously served as the Office's acting United States attorney, first assistant United States attorney, and chief of the Major Crimes Section.

=== U.S. Attorney ===
On June 19, 2019, President Donald Trump announced his intent to nominate Muldrow to be the United States attorney for the District of Puerto Rico. On June 24, 2019, his nomination was sent to the United States Senate. His nomination was favorably reported to the floor by the Senate Judiciary Committee, and he was confirmed by the full Senate on September 26, 2019. He was sworn into office on October 4, 2019.

On February 8, 2021, he along with 55 other Trump-era attorneys were asked to resign. On February 26, 2021, Muldrow announced that the White House asked him to continue as U.S. attorney.
