= Francisco Parés Alicea =

Puerto Rican accountant and government official (born c.1988)

Francisco Parés

Secretary of Treasury of Puerto Rico
- In office June 24, 2019 – January 31, 2024
- Governor: Ricardo Rosselló; Pedro Pierluisi (acting); Wanda Vázquez Garced; Pedro Pierluisi
- Preceded by: Raúl Maldonado
- Succeeded by: Nelson Pérez Méndez (acting)

Personal details
- Born: March 29, 1988 (age 38) Manatí, Puerto Rico
- Education: University of Puerto Rico, Río Piedras (BBA); Northeastern University (MS)

Francisco Parés Alicea (born c. 1988) is a Puerto Rican accountant and government official who served as the secretary of treasury of Puerto Rico from 2019 to 2024.

== Biography ==
Although Parés was born in Manatí, Puerto Rico he spent his childhood in the Monte Llano neighborhood of Morovis, Puerto Rico. He completed a bachelor's of business administration in accounting at the University of Puerto Rico, Río Piedras Campus. Parés earned a Master of Science in taxation from Northeastern University.

Parés is a certified public accountant and worked for Deloitte. He later became the assistant secretary for internal review and tax policy areas in the Puerto Rico Department of Treasury. In July 2019, he was nominated by Governor Ricardo Rosselló to succeed Raúl Maldonado as Secretary of Treasury of Puerto Rico. Parés resigned on January 31, 2024.

Political offices
Preceded by Raúl Maldonado	Secretary of Treasury of Puerto Rico; 2019–2024	Succeeded by Nelson Pérez Méndez; Acting
