= Melba Acosta Febo =

Puerto Rican politician

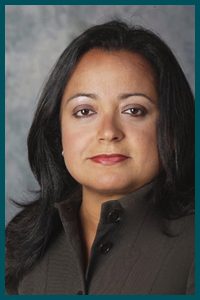

President of the Puerto Rico Government Development Bank
- In office October 27, 2014 – July 7, 2016
- Governor: Alejandro García Padilla
- Preceded by: Javier Ferrer
- Succeeded by: Alberto Bacó Bagué

Secretary of Treasury of Puerto Rico
- In office January 2, 2013 – October 26, 2014
- Governor: Alejandro García Padilla
- Preceded by: Jesús Méndez
- Succeeded by: Juan Zaragoza

Director of the Office of Management and Budget of Puerto Rico
- In office January 2, 2001 – December 15, 2004
- Governor: Sila María Calderón
- Preceded by: Jorge Aponte
- Succeeded by: Ileana Fas

Personal details
- Born: Melba Acosta Febo Arecibo, Puerto Rico, U.S.
- Education: University of Puerto Rico, Río Piedras (BBA); University of Puerto Rico School of Law (JD); Harvard Business School (MBA)
- Occupation: Corporate executive, attorney, Certified Public Accountant
- Website: Official LinkedIn

Melba Acosta Febo is a corporate executive, attorney, and certified public accountant. She is a former president of the Government Development Bank of Puerto Rico and a former chief public finance officer of Puerto Rico. Acosta also served as the Secretary of the Treasury of Puerto Rico, director of the Puerto Rico Office of Management and Budget and chief of staff of the municipality of San Juan.

== Private sector career ==
In the private sector, she held various corporate positions at R&G Financial Corporation, such as chief administrative officer, corporate risk manager, and chief financial officer (CFO). She was also a corporate counsel at Puerto Rico's largest law firm, McConnell Valdés, LLC, and a tax consultant with Price Waterhouse. Acosta holds a BBA in accounting and a JD, both from the University of Puerto Rico, Rio Piedras, and an MBA from the Harvard Business School, where she was an Eli Lilly scholar. She has been a member of the board of directors of the Puerto Rico Museum of Art (Chairwoman, Treasurer, and Secretary), the Fundacion Luis Munoz Marin (Treasurer, Secretary) and United Way of Puerto Rico.

Political offices
| Preceded by Blanca Álvarez | Secretary of Treasury of Puerto Rico; 2013–2014 | Succeeded by Juan Zaragoza |
