= Pasquines =

Nonprofit news organization covering United States territories

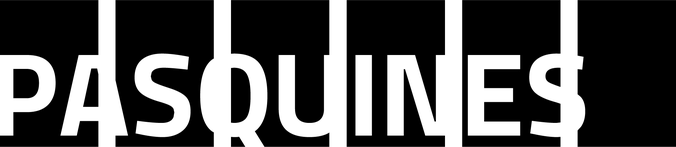
- Founded: 2013; 13 years ago
- Founder: William-Jose Velez Gonzalez
- Type: Nonprofit news organization
- Purpose: Journalism in United States territories
- Headquarters: Mayagüez, Puerto Rico; Washington, DC
- Region served: United States
- Key people: William-Jose Velez Gonzalez, Founder and Editor in Chief
- Affiliations: Fiscally sponsored by The Hack Foundation
- Website: pasquines.us

Pasquines is a nonprofit policy and politics news organization covering topics related to government, economy, and society in the United States territories. Based in Mayaguez, Puerto Rico and Washington, DC, it was founded in 2013 by William-Jose Velez Gonzalez, who serves as editor in chief. Its slogan, "context of islands," was introduced in 2018 to mark its fifth anniversary.

== Name ==
The publication is named after the Puerto Rican custom of placing repetitive political flyers in public spaces, known as a "pasquinada".

== History ==
Pasquines started out as a politics blog dedicated to covering "all the politics," focusing on local and federal political stories affecting Puerto Rico. Its name derives from the custom in Puerto Rico of placing political flyers in public spaces, often plastering copies of the same flyer until entire walls are covered, which is known locally in Spanish as a "pasquinada." On April 6, 2015, Pasquines launched its internship program, aiming at providing a training and education experience for students in the United States, while expanding its reach.

Since then, the organization has expanded its focus, now covering news about politics, public policy, economy, technology, design, and innovation. On its website, it lists a volunteer staff of 12, not including contributors and intern writers. Pasquines is a member of the Institute for Nonprofit News and LION Publishers, networks supporting independent, nonprofit, and local news organizations.

In June 2018, Pasquines celebrated 5 years since it began publishing online. As part of its anniversary campaign it unveiled the "context of islands" slogan.

== Polling ==
On March 21, 2016, Pasquines began conducting election polls in Puerto Rico. Its polling data has been referenced by Daily Kos and FiveThirtyEight.

== Recognition ==
In 2016, FiveThirtyEight journalist Harry Enten praised Pasquines' polling performance in Puerto Rico, calling it a strong result in a challenging election year. In 2022, U.S. News & World Report highlighted the organization for its contribution to improving awareness of issues in the territories, and in 2023 The New York Times cited its reporting among notable examples of local journalism.

== See also ==
- Media of Puerto Rico
- List of newspapers in Puerto Rico
