= Juan Zaragoza (politician) =

Former Secretary of Treasury of Puerto Rico

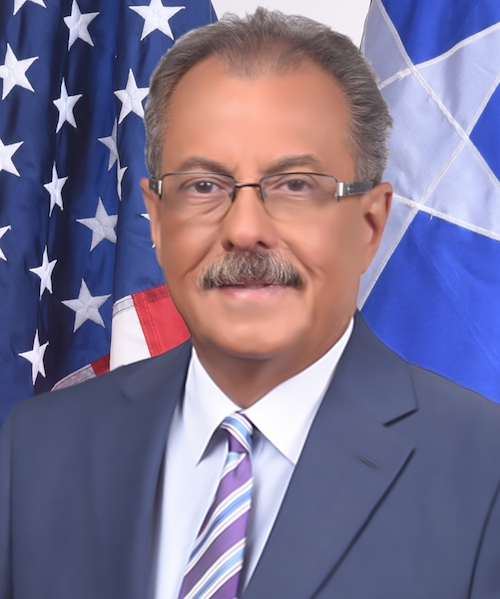

Member of the Puerto Rico Senate from the at-large district
- In office January 2, 2021 – January 2, 2025

Secretary of Treasury of Puerto Rico
- In office October 26, 2014 – January 2, 2017
- Governor: Alejandro García Padilla
- Preceded by: Melba Acosta
- Succeeded by: Raúl Maldonado

Personal details
- Born: October 5, 1959 (age 66) Bayamón, Puerto Rico
- Party: Popular Democratic
- Other political affiliations: Democratic
- Education: University of Puerto Rico, Río Piedras (BBA); Indiana University Bloomington (MBA)

Juan Clemente Zaragoza Gómez (born October 5, 1959) is a certified public accountant who has been a member of the Puerto Rico Senate since 2021 and served as the former Secretary of Treasury of Puerto Rico.

== Early life and education ==
He graduated at Colegio Nuestra Señora Del Pilar in Río Piedras. From 2014 to 2017. Juan Zaragoza Gómez has a B.B.A. in accounting from the University of Puerto Rico and a master's in Management from Indiana University Bloomington.

== Politics ==
Was elected to the Puerto Rico Senate as an at-large district senator. In January 2023 he announced his interest in seeking the PPD candidacy for governor in the 2024 elections.

Juan Zaragoza lost the June 2, 2024 primary elections to Jesús Manuel Ortiz of the PPD, conceding the candidacy for governor after the result was certified by the State Elections Commission.

Political offices
Preceded by Melba Acosta	Secretary of Treasury of Puerto Rico; 2014–2017	Succeeded by Raúl Maldonado
