= Juan Carlos Puig =

Puerto Rican economist

Juan Carlos Puig was Governor Luis Fortuño's first Secretary of the Treasury of Puerto Rico, sworn in on January 2, 2009, by Secretary of State Kenneth McClintock. As such, Puig was second-in-line of succession of the governorship, should Fortuño, McClintock and the Attorney General not be available, and, in fact, served as Acting Governor several times. He has since been appointed by the Governor as Puerto Rico's first Inspector General. He currently serves in a recess appointment, pending legislative confirmation.

Puig was on leave from the United States Internal Revenue Service, while serving in Puerto Rico's Cabinet.
