= Secretary of Treasury of Puerto Rico =

Government of Puerto Rico

- Incumbent; Ángel L. Pantoja Rodríguez since February 1, 2024
- Department of Treasury
- Nominator: Governor
- Appointer: Governor with advice and consent from the Senate
- Term length: 4 years
- Formation: Established by Article IV of the Constitution of Puerto Rico
- Succession: Third
- Website: www.hacienda.gobierno.pr

The secretary of treasury of Puerto Rico (commonly known as the treasurer of Puerto Rico) is the chief financial officer and the treasurer of the government of Puerto Rico.

== Secretaries ==
The following is a list of officeholders:

- 1917–1922: José E. Benedicto
- 1922–1923: Ramón Aboy
- 1923–1924: J.W. Bonner
- 1924–1929: Juan G. Gallardo
- 1930–1935: Manuel V. Domenech
- 1935–1940: Rafael Sancho Bonet
- 1941–1948: Rafael Buscaglia
- 1949–1955: Sol Luis Descartes
- 1955–1958: Rafael Picó
- 1958–1963: José R. Nogueras
- 1964–1968: Jorge Font Saldaña
- 1969–1970: Ángel M. Rivera
- 1970–1971: Ángel Martín Taboas
- 1971–1972: Wallace González Oliver
- 1972–1973: Raymond J. González
- 1973–1976: Salvador E. Casellas
- 1976–1981: Julio César Pérez
- 1981–1984: Carmen Ana Culpeper
- 1985–1989: Juan Agosto Alicea
- 1989–1992: Ramón García Santiago
- 1992–1993: Ángel Rivera
- 1993–1997: Manuel Díaz Saldaña
- 1997–2000: Xenia Vélez Silva
- 2001–2004: Juan A. Flores Galarza
- 2005–2007: Juan C. Méndez Torres
- 2008–2008: José G. Dávila Matos
- 2008–2008: Ángel A. Ortiz García
- 2009–2010: Juan Carlos Puig
- 2010–2012: Jesús F. Méndez
- 2012–2012: Blanca Álvarez
- 2013–2014: Melba Acosta Febo
- 2014–2017: Juan Zaragoza
- 2017–2018: Raúl Maldonado
- 2018–2019: Teresita Fuentes
- 2019: Raúl Maldonado
- 2019–2024: Francisco Parés Alicea
- 2024–2025: Nelson Pérez Méndez
- 2025-current: Ángel L. Pantoja Rodríguez
