= AtlasIntel =

Brazilian market research company

- Industry: Market Research; Data Analysis; Public Opinion Polling
- Founded: 2017
- Founder: Andrei Roman; Thiago Costa
- Headquarters: São Paulo, Brazil
- Number of locations: 40+ countries
- Area served: North America; South America; Central America and Carriabean; Europe; Africa; Middle East; East Asia; South Asia; Australia
- Key people: Andrei Roman CEO Thiago Costa CTO
- Products: Atlas Tracking PRO Atlas Inflation; Atlas Radar; Atlas Gov360; Atlas Monitor; Atlas VRC Atlas Focus
- Services: Quantitative populational surveys High-frequency public opinion tracking Economic forecasting Social media monitoring Brand intelligence Pricing optimization Advertising intelligence
- Number of employees: 50 - 100
- Website: www.atlasintel.org

AtlasIntel is a global market research and data intelligence company. It was founded by Andrei Roman and Thiago Costa. AtlasIntel conducts public and private polling in South America, North America, Europe, and Africa.

AtlasIntel has a reputation for accurate political polling, being ranked as the most accurate pollster of the 2020 United States presidential election and accurately predicting electoral results in various Latin American countries. Poll aggregator FiveThirtyEight ranked AtlasIntel at 2.7 out of 3 stars, based on its historical accuracy and disclosure of methodology. In 2025, statistician Nate Silver ranked AtlasIntel as the most accurate pollster in American politics.

== United States ==
As of 2026, AtlasIntel is the most accurate pollster of the national popular vote in four consecutive election cycles: the 2020 United States presidential election, the 2022 midterms, the 2024 United States presidential election, and the 2026 midterms.

In 2025, AtlasIntel was rated as the most accurate American political pollster by Nate Silver.

According to an analysis by polling aggregator FiveThirtyEight, AtlasIntel was the most accurate pollster of the 2020 United States presidential election, with an average error of 2.2 points.

For the 2024 United States presidential election, Silver ranked AtlasIntel as the second best pollster, tied with Patriot Polling and second only to OnMessage Inc, while polling firm ActiVote ranked AtlasIntel as the best pollster of the election.

== South America ==
AtlasIntel's polling had the most accurate results among pollsters in the 2019 Argentine general election. It also correctly predicted the rejection of the 2022 Chilean constitutional referendum.

AtlasIntel was the most accurate pollster of the 2022 Presidential election in Brazil. It slightly underestimated the vote share of Jair Bolsonaro in the first round of voting in the 2022 Brazilian general election, but to a lesser extent than other major pollsters. Atlas predicted a 9-point margin between Bolsonaro and Lula da Silva, with the first round outcome being a 5-point margin. During the election, AtlasIntel was involved in a dispute with partnered news organizations that it said had leaked poll results prior to agreed-upon embargo dates.

AtlasIntel routinely conducts polling on political attitudes in Brazil. CEO Andrei Roman expressed concern over recent trends that showed increased distrust in the electoral process, citing findings like a 2022 post-election poll showing that over 38% of Brazilians believing that Bolsonaro was the rightful winner of the 2022 election.

AtlasIntel has established a partnership with Bloomberg News for the development of a study on five Latin American countries (Argentina, Brazil, Chile, Colombia and Mexico), known as Latam Pulse. The study has a monthly release schedule, and features polling regarding government approval ratings and other key political discussion topics of the month.

== Europe ==
Atlas Intel has conducted political polls in France and Romania. During a standard investigation funded by the Calouste Gulbenkian Foundation and the European Media Fund, the poll aggregator Europe Elects did not find documented evidence for conflict of interest, and includes the pollster in its database of reliable pollsters.

For the 2026 Hungarian parliamentary election, Atlas Intel's poll had an error of just 0.2 percentage points.

== Polling methodology ==
AtlasIntel utilizes web-based polling and conducts sampling through its proprietary "Random Digital Recruitment". Poll respondents are recruited through the geolocated targeting of web browsing users. AtlasIntel polls seek to identify patterns in variable non-response rates during sampling and adjust accordingly to mitigate nonresponse bias. AtlasIntel conducts poststratification of its samples with the variables of gender, age, education, income, region, and prior electoral behavior.
