= Placeholder (politics) =

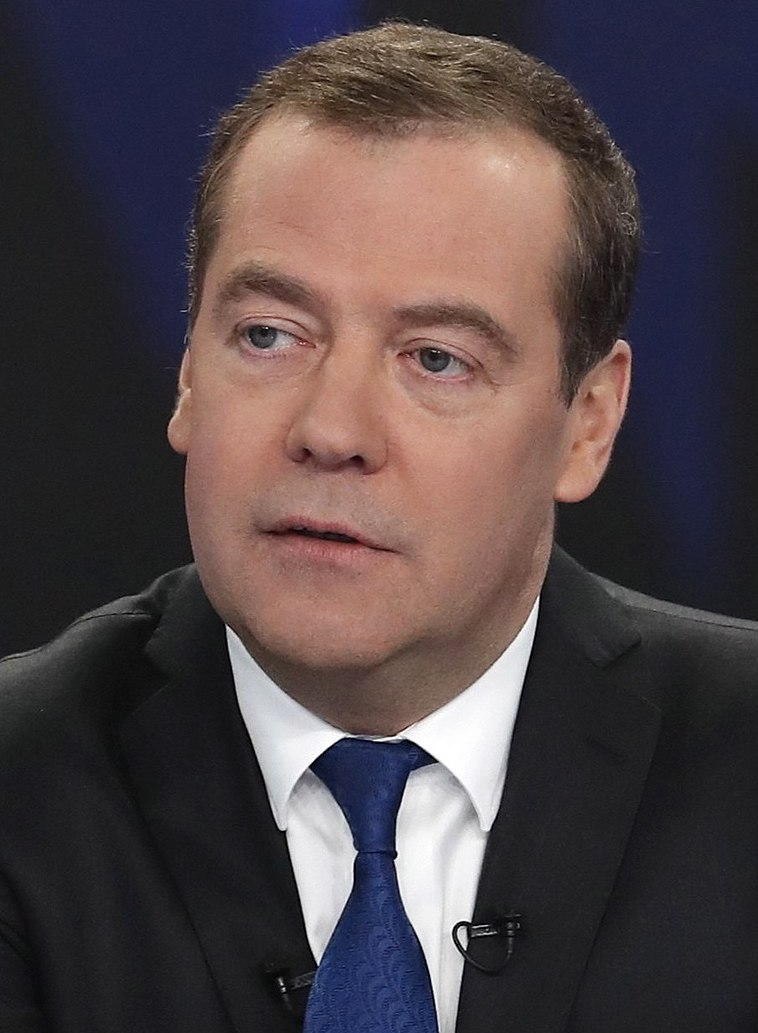
Dmitry Medvedev was seen largely as an unofficial placeholder for Vladimir Putin due to a limit of two consecutive terms for Russian presidents at the time

In politics, a placeholder is an official appointed temporarily to a position, with the understanding that they will not seek office in their own right.

The situation often occurs in cases where a United States senator dies in office or leaves before the expiration of their term. In most states, governors have the power to appoint a replacement temporarily, until a special election can be held. Governors interested in seeking the office may appoint themselves to the position; however, this may be seen by voters in a negative light as self-dealing and creating an undue advantage, and it may backfire leading to the new senator's defeat. To avoid this, the governor may instead select an aide to fill the slot for a few months, with the understanding that the appointee does not seek a full term. After the resignation of Senator Mel Martinez of Florida, Florida governor Charlie Crist appointed his chief of staff George LeMieux to the vacant Senate seat, which Crist ultimately ran for. A governor may appoint a placeholder even if they are not intending to run for the Senate themselves. Governor Deval Patrick of Massachusetts did this twice, appointing former Democratic National Committee chairman Paul G. Kirk in 2009 following the death of Senator Ted Kennedy, and chief of staff Mo Cowan in 2013 upon the resignation of Senator John Kerry to become United States Secretary of State. Occasionally, a former politician may be called out of retirement to serve as a temporary appointee, as occurred with Jon Kyl of Arizona in September 2018. Kyl had served three terms in the U.S. Senate, from 1995 until his retirement in 2013, but was appointed as a placeholder by Arizona governor Doug Ducey following the death in office of incumbent John McCain.

Placeholders may also be used in cases where more than one member of a party is interested in seeking the office, and the governor does not wish to choose between competing members of their own party. Placeholders may also be appointed when a senator leaves office while a campaign for the seat is already underway, so as not to affect the outcome of the election. For example, after the death of Senator Paul Wellstone in 2002 just weeks before election day, Minnesota governor Jesse Ventura appointed Dean Barkley to serve, as Barkley was not running for the office, and his appointment would not affect the election.

Historically, in cases where a politician died in office, a variation known as widow's succession was sometimes followed, where the deceased politician's widow was appointed to the seat as a placeholder.

== Placeholder candidates ==
A subset of placeholders is the placeholder candidate. A placeholder candidate is used in politics as a temporary stand-in for ballot access petitioning purposes until the actual nominees are decided. The need for such placeholders arises from the fact that many third parties must begin their petitioning efforts to meet ballot access deadlines well before their nominating conventions. In any event, the petitions are technically to put presidential electors on the ballot, who may switch their allegiance at any time. In 2008, Michael Badnarik was used as a placeholder candidate in Libertarian petitioning, and Michael Bloomberg and Gail Parker were used as placeholders in Independent Green petitioning. The use of placeholders is sometimes criticized as deceptive.

Perhaps the best-known placeholder candidate was retired Admiral James Stockdale, who had been used in 1992 as a placeholder vice presidential candidate by activists seeking to draft Ross Perot to run for the presidency as an independent. By the time Perot committed to run, it was too late to remove Stockdale's name from the ballot, and Stockdale remained on the ticket, even joining Dan Quayle and Al Gore in the nationally televised vice presidential debate, where Stockdale quipped, "Who am I? Why am I here?" in his introductory speech.
