= William Villafañe =

Puerto Rican politician (born 1977)

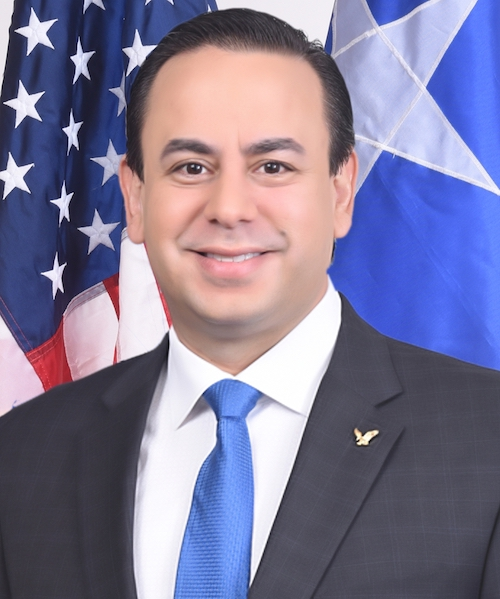
- Villafañe in 2021

Member of the Puerto Rico Senate from the at-large district
- In office November 16, 2019 – December 31, 2024

Chief of Staff of Puerto Rico
- In office January 2, 2017 – May 2, 2018
- Governor: Ricardo Rosselló
- Preceded by: Grace Santana Balado
- Succeeded by: Raúl Maldonado

Personal details
- Born: William Ely Villafañe Ramos; June 16, 1977 (age 49) Arecibo, Puerto Rico
- Party: New Progressive
- Other political affiliations: Republican
- Education: University of Puerto Rico at Mayagüez (BA); Interamerican University of Puerto Rico School of Law (JD)

William Ely Villafañe Ramos is a member at-large of the Puerto Rico Senate. He is also the Chief of Staff of Puerto Rico from 2017 to 2018. Villafañe was a candidate for Resident Commissioner in the November 2024 election.

== Early life and education ==
Villafañe Ramos was born in Arecibo, Puerto Rico on June 16, 1977. The son of Ada Irma Ramos Medina, a public school teacher and William Villafañe Andújar, a former baseball player, is the father of two sons. Villafañe Ramos is married to a scholar psychologist.

Before becoming a lawyer, Villafañe Ramos studied at Bernardo González Colón Elementary School, Francisco Ramos Junior High School and Luis Muñoz Rivera High School in Utuado, Puerto Rico. An alumnus of the University of Puerto Rico at Mayagüez, in which he obtained a bachelor's degree in Business Administration, majoring in accounting, he later attended the Interamerican University of Puerto Rico School of Law, from which he obtained a Juris Doctor.

== Career ==
In the political arena, in 1995 he served as President of the New Progressive Party's Youth in Utuado. He was the President and founder of the Pro-Statehood University Students in Action movement at the Mayagüez Campus of the University of Puerto Rico. In 2002, he was elected President of the State Youth. During 2004 he was a member of the Platform Committee of the New Progressive Party. Later on, he acted as Operations Director for "Plan for Puerto Rico". In 2016 he was designated Secretary General of the New Progressive Party.

Villafañe Ramos was Legislative Assistant at the Treasury Committee of the House of Representatives (1999), Administrator of the Commission of Public Service (2000), Director of the Legislative Committees on Housing and Urban Development, Comptroller's Reports and Families and Communities (2005), Advisor to agencies and government departments such as the Department of Natural and Environmental Resources, Office of the Commissioner of Municipal Αffairs and the Authority for Housing Financing (2010) and Chief Executive of the Commission for Public Service (2013). Also, in 2017, he was appointed Chief of Staff by Governor Ricardo Rosselló Nevares.

Villafañe Ramos was elected Senator at-large in 2019 as a candidate of the New Progressive Party. He was sworn in and appointed President of the Committee on Energy as well as of the Public-Private Alliances Committee. In 2020, he was re-elected and appointed member of the Committee on Designations. Treasury Committee, Federal Affairs and Oversight Board Committee, Committee on Compliance and Restructuring, Committee on Economic Development, Essential Services and Consumer Affairs and the Committee on the Development of the Southern Central Region.

Villafañe is well known as a pro-statehood leader in Puerto Rico. He is a former Secretary-General (2016) of the New Progressive Party (PNP in Spanish), the only pro-statehood party in Puerto Rico. On the 2020 plebiscite, he coordinated the efforts to achieve the victory of the statehood option (53%).

Villafañe won his chair as senator at-large on November 16, 2019. In November 2020, he was re-elected, with the most votes of his party fellows, as senator at-large for a new four-year-term.

Villafañe identifies as a member of the Republican Party. He was the Puerto Rico campaign manager for the Ben Carson 2016 presidential campaign.
