= Javier Jiménez (mayor) =

Puerto Rican politician

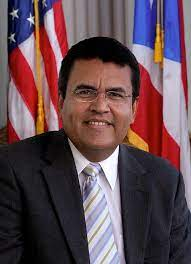

Mayor of San Sebastián
- In office January 14, 2005 – January 14, 2025
- Preceded by: Justo Medina Estévez
- Succeeded by: Eladio Cardona Quiles

Personal details
- Born: November 12, 1961 (age 64)
- Citizenship: American
- Party: New Progressive (until 2023); PD (2023–2026); Independent (2026–present)
- Other political affiliations: Republican
- Education: University of Puerto Rico at Mayagüez (BBA)
- Occupation: Politician; accountant; Presbyterian elder (formerly)

Javier Jiménez Pérez (born November 12, 1961), is a Puerto Rican politician who has served as the mayor of San Sebastián since 2005. Jiménez was affiliated with the New Progressive Party (PNP) until 2023, when he joined Project Dignity. In 2024, he became Project Dignity's president and their 2024 nominee for governor of Puerto Rico.

== Education ==
Has a Bachelor's Degree in Business Administration with a concentration in Accounting from the University of Puerto Rico at Mayagüez.

== Career ==
He was President of the San Sebastian Municipal Legislature from 1993 to 1995. On the 2nd of November 2004, he was elected Mayor. In 2005 he was elected as Co-Chairman of the Board of the Municipal Revenue Collection Center (CRIM), exercising until 2008. In 2009, he was elected Chairman of the Board of CRIM until 2012.

In September 2023, Jiménez left the New Progressive Party and joined Project Dignity. On January 27, 2024 he took the presidency Project Dignity and announced his candidacy in the 2024 gubernatorial election.

== Hurricane Maria ==
Hurricane Maria, on September 20, 2017, triggered numerous landslides in San Sebastián with the significant amount of rain that fell. The hurricane winds knocked the power out and the entire municipality was left in the dark, as was the rest or Puerto Rico.

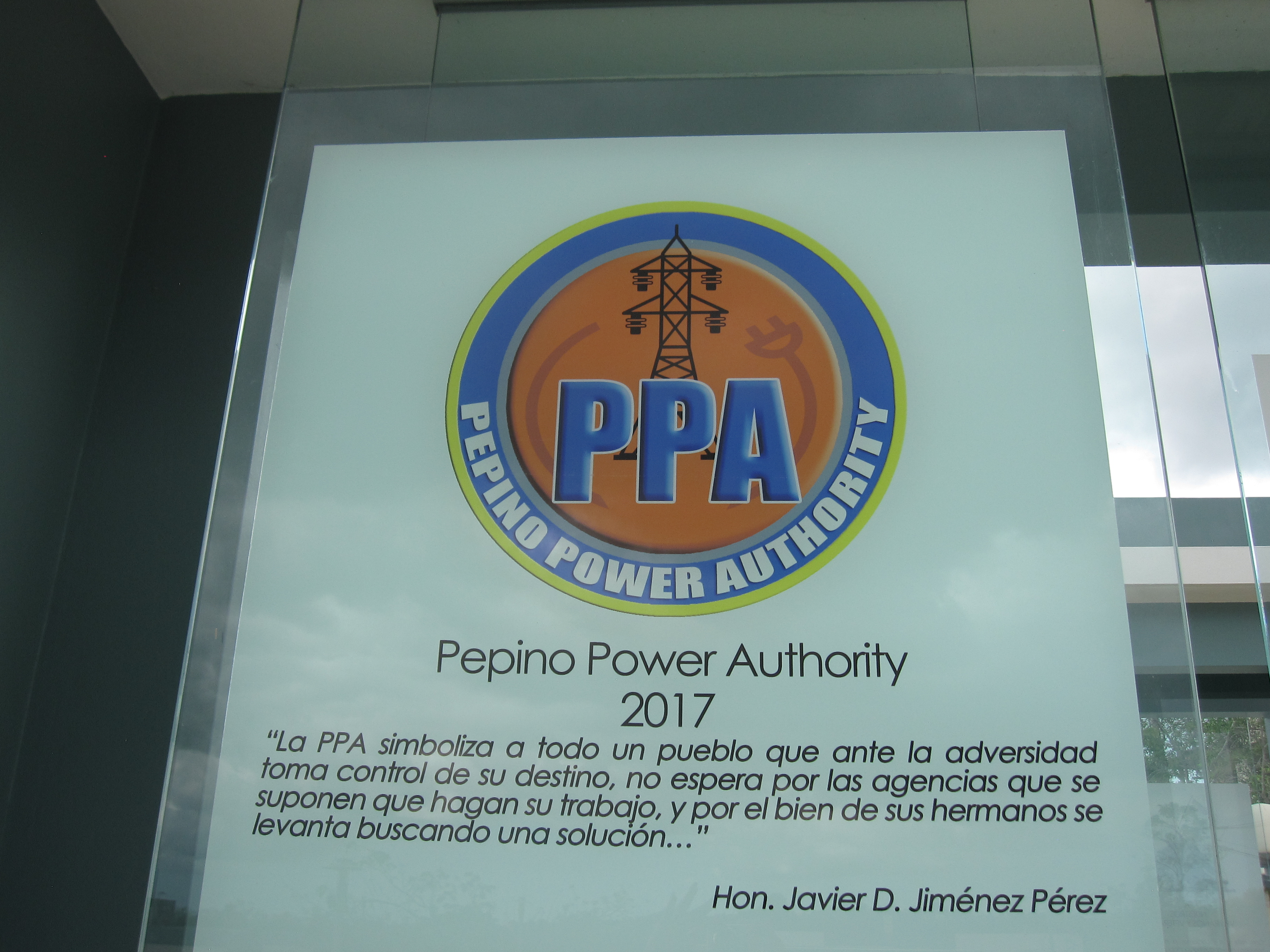
Top of monument honoring Pepino Power Authority.

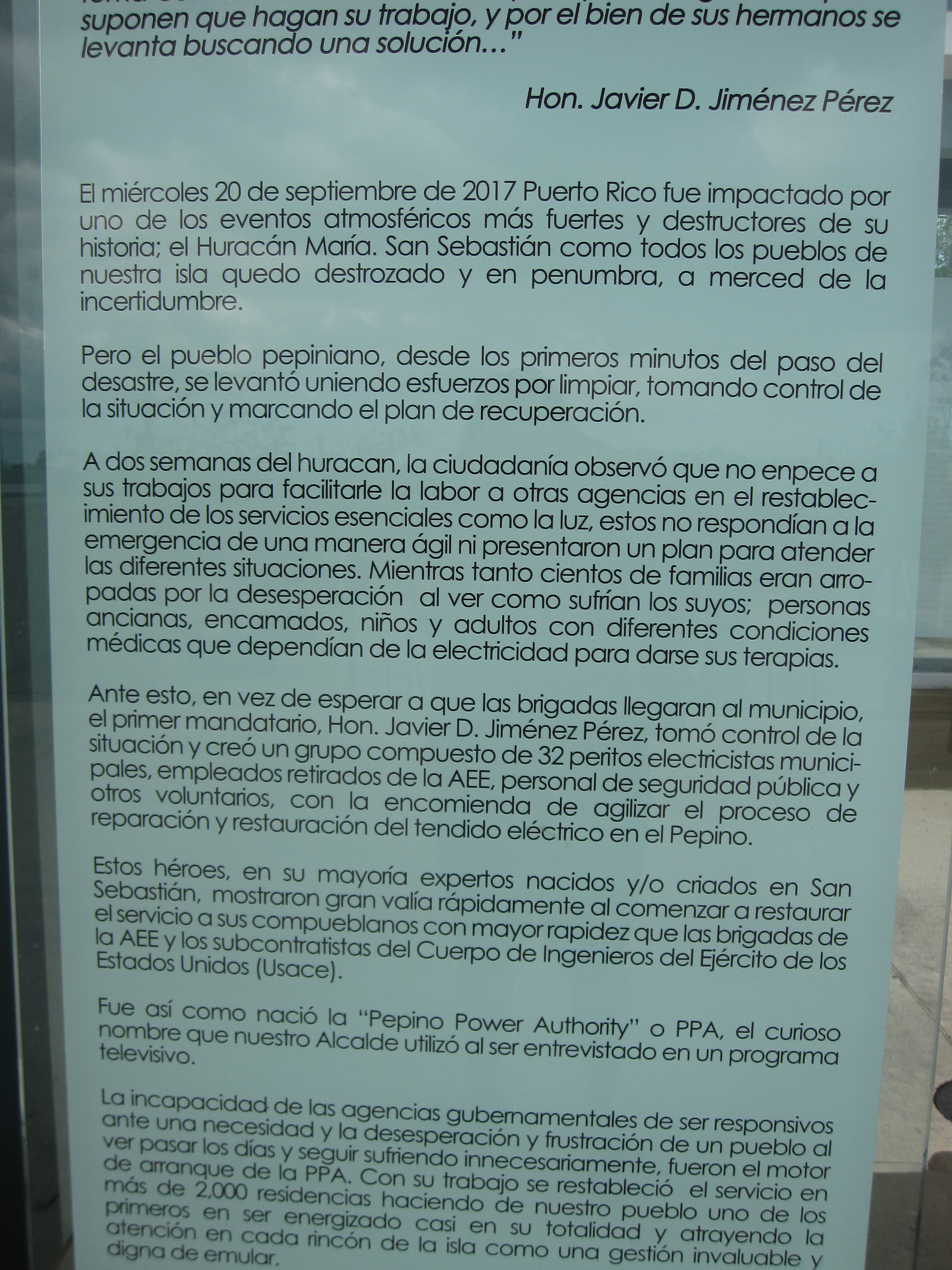
Bottom of monument honoring Pepino Power Authority.

Two weeks after the hurricane decimated the island, Jiménez noticed that help was not on the way. He decided that San Sebastián would not wait for the AEE brigades to come. He assembled an ad hoc team of volunteers, some who were retired AEE electricians and their mandate was to get the electrical power back up and running, for the people of San Sebastián. They were able to restore 92% of the electricity within two months. A monument honoring the accomplishments of the Pepino Power Authority, as they were quickly named, was erected in Plaza de la Identidad Pepiniana in San Sebastián barrio-pueblo.

In early 2019, Jiménez received an Outstanding Achievement Award from the National Hurricane Center (NHC) for mitigating the power failure.
