= Paper candidate =

Election candidate of a party with little support

In a representative democracy, a paper candidate (also known as a no-hope candidate) is a candidate who stands for a political party in an electoral division where the party in question enjoys only low levels of support. Although the candidate has little chance of winning, a major party will normally make an effort to ensure it has its name on the ballot paper in every constituency. In two-party systems, a paper candidate may also be known as token opposition. In Dutch-speaking countries, the last candidate on a party list is called a lijstduwer and is usually a well-known non-politician such as an artist, celebrity or athlete, chosen to attract more votes for the party.

A dummy candidate is similar to a paper candidate in that both types do not expect to win their race; however, they differ in that a dummy candidate typically has an ulterior motive for being in the race, such as to dishonestly divert votes away from more legitimate candidates or to take advantage of benefits afforded to political candidates. Another related concept is the stalking horse candidate, a junior or little-known politician who challenges an incumbent to test the support for a more serious challenge from someone else.

== United States ==
Paper candidates may be local party members, or members from neighbouring areas or from central office depending on the laws of the jurisdiction; most U.S. states, for example, require all candidates for state and local office to reside in the district they intend on representing for a certain length of time. The main purpose of fielding paper candidates is to maintain or improve the profile of a political party and, in two-party systems, to provide at least nominal opposition to a seemingly unassailable incumbent. Another potential use for paper candidacy is to allow a candidate who wants off the ballot of another race to do so by running for something else, a race they cannot possibly win (such as Rick Lazio, who lost a Republican primary for New York Governor in 2010 but still had a third-party ballot line; in order to disqualify himself from the gubernatorial election Lazio was nominated for a judicial seat in the Bronx that was so heavily Democratic that he could not have possibly won if he wanted to, and he did not). The paper candidates themselves typically do little or no campaigning and neither incur nor claim any expenses.

There are circumstances where a paper candidate can win an election, often when the opposing candidate is unexpectedly embroiled in scandal; for example, then-27-year-old American Chris Smith, who ran as a token opponent to New Jersey congressman Frank Thompson in 1978 and 1980, won the latter contest after Thompson was embroiled in the Abscam scandal. Another example is Michael Patrick Flanagan, a little-known Republican attorney who defeated longtime Democratic incumbent Dan Rostenkowski, the onetime powerful Chair of the House Ways and Means Committee, in a heavily Democratic Chicago-based district after Rostenkowski was indicted on charges of mail fraud. The victory occurred in 1994 as part of a national Republican wave.

In jurisdictions with strict campaign finance and spending laws governing elections, it is often a legal necessity to run the maximum number candidates permitted (or close thereto) in order to spend the maximum amount of money otherwise permitted by law. In such cases, parties will run paper candidates, but will usually endeavour to use the extra spending allowance afforded (at least to the extent that it may be permitted in the jurisdiction) to campaign in districts where they have a realistic chance of winning.

In Puerto Rico, every party has to run candidates; thus, paper candidates can occur when parties form alliances.

== United Kingdom ==
In the United Kingdom, major parties often find it difficult to field a full list of candidates for all council seats up for election, especially in the case of councils with "all-up" elections. Parties find it desirable to persuade people to stand as paper candidates so that:

- Supporters have an opportunity to vote for the party
- The total vote obtained across the council and the nation is maximised
- All seats are contested so there is no risk that candidates from other parties can be declared elected unopposed

In Britain, being nominated as a local election candidate simply involves signing some forms, with no deposit required. A paper candidate will often do no campaigning at all and so be able to submit a zero return of election expenses, simplifying the paperwork for the election agent. Paper candidates are commonly fielded in different locations by all the major parties in both local and national elections.

Some paper candidates stand in order to help their party but do not wish to be elected to the post in question. In fact, some paper candidates only agree to stand after receiving assurances that there is no "risk" of them getting elected. Following the Scottish National Party's landslide in Scotland in the 2015 general election, when they went from 6 to 56 seats (out of 59 Scottish seats), it was reported that some candidates were so surprised at winning they considered resigning immediately after the election. In the 2019 general election, some Conservative candidates were selected just weeks prior to the election and won seats in the Labour "red wall" in northern England and Wales, which were previously considered unwinnable by the party. After joining Reform UK in 2024, James McMurdock won South Basildon and East Thurrock in that year's general election after the party—without enough people to run for available seats—asked him to serve as a paper candidate.

In Belfast North at the 2017 election, the Social Democratic and Labour Party (SDLP) were criticised for standing Martin McAuley as a "paper candidate" — a deliberately weak candidate, a 26-year-old with little experience, on the assumption that nationalist and Catholic voters would instead vote for Sinn Féin, instead of the unionist candidate Nigel Dodds (DUP). McAuley rejected the label of "paper candidate". Dodds narrowly won the election. In 2019, the SDLP did not field a candidate in Belfast North and Sinn Féin won the seat. The SDLP were also accused of standing a "paper candidate," Mary Garrity, in Fermanagh and South Tyrone in 2017, in order to help Sinn Féin win the seat from the UUP.

Campaigning organisations often put paper candidates up to run as independents, with the ensuing media coverage surrounding the election raising awareness of a particular campaign or cause. For example, during the 2026 Scottish Parliament election Robert Pownall, a member of campaign organisation Protect The Wild, contested the Edinburgh Central constituency while dressed as a giant gannet in order to protest against the annual guga hunt on Sula Sgeir. Pownall later contested the 2026 Makerfield by-election dressed as a fox, to put pressure on the UK government over its commitments to ban hunting with hounds in the UK.

== Ireland ==
In Ireland, the single transferable vote system is used, so paper candidates are less common and more seats are up for grabs. However, there have been cases of unexpected surges for certain parties (such as Labour in 1992 and Sinn Féin in 2020) that led to many paper candidates being unexpectedly elected. This was epitomised in 1992 with Moosajee Bhamjee, Ireland's first Indian and first Muslim TD, who only stood in Clare because no one else in the local Labour party wanted to. In 2020, many inexperienced Sinn Féin candidates won, such as Claire Kerrane (Roscommon–Galway) and Violet-Anne Wynne (Clare), both of whom had never held an elected office before and were the first Sinn Féin TDs in those counties since the 1920s. On the other hand, the success of the Social Democrats in the 2020 election was attributed to their lack of paper candidates: they fielded candidates in just 20 out of 39 constituencies and won 6 TDs.

== Canada ==
In Canada, paper candidates may exist at both the federal and provincial / territorial levels, while the term is more rare in municipal elections as official parties are not very common at the city council level. As in Great Britain, they most commonly exist to allow the main political parties to field candidates in as many constituencies as possible. From 2004 to 2011, parties at the federal level had a financial incentive to draw as many votes as possible due to a per-vote subsidy, paid to all parties with at least 2% of the total popular vote regardless of the number of seats actually won. This payment, enacted under a Liberal government, was fully eliminated in 2015 under a Conservative government.

While the per-vote subsidies were eliminated at the federal level, they continue to exist at the provincial level in British Columbia, Ontario, Quebec, and Nova Scotia.

Nevertheless, even without per-vote subsidies, parties have other strong incentives to maximize their overall popular vote. In particular, even though winning the popular vote in itself conveys no special rights or privileges in the Canadian electoral system, there have been multiple instances (especially at the provincial level) where a party that has won the popular vote but not a plurality of seats has attempted to claim a mandate to govern, often using its popular vote victory to justify such claims. Political parties therefore have an incentive to ensure at all costs that the entire electorate can at least vote for them.

Paper candidates are sometimes used if the party is not seriously contesting the election but must run candidates so it can either get registered or stay registered for some other purpose. In such cases, paper candidates will usually run in districts where ideologically like-minded parties are seen to have little chance of winning to minimize the risk of any nominal support they might receive proving to be the decisive margin in a close local election under Canada's first-past-the-post electoral system.

An example of this scenario in action was found in Saskatchewan, where the Progressive Conservative Party withdrew from public presence in the late 1990s but continued to run at least ten candidates, all in urban ridings where the then-governing Saskatchewan New Democratic Party was dominant at the time, in the province's general elections until the relevant law was amended so as to keep its registration with Elections Saskatchewan, largely to avoid losing control of what at the time was believed to be a substantial amount of money. (Most of the PCs' former politicians and grassroots members formed or joined the Saskatchewan Party.) The Progressive Conservative Party has since attempted to "revive" itself and no longer considers its nominees to be paper candidates. However, they have only achieved modest levels of support with candidates affiliated with the national Conservative Party typically running under the banner of the Progressive Conservative Party in provincial elections.

In neighbouring Alberta, the United Conservative Party formed from a "merger" of the Progressive Conservative and Wildrose parties. However, as Albertan electoral law did not permit the parties to merge officially, both parties continue to exist on paper under the UCP leadership team. Albertan electoral law only requires a party to nominate one candidate to maintain its registration, so in the 2019 provincial election, each party ran one candidate in Edmonton-Strathcona, the riding represented by the incumbent New Democratic premier, Rachel Notley, which is widely seen to be the NDP's safest seat. The PC candidate polled enough votes to finish in fourth place, ahead of candidates for parties running serious campaigns such as the Alberta Liberal Party.

Paper candidates in Quebec ("poteau" in Canadian French, suggesting that the candidate will only be seen on utility poles), particularly of the name-on-ballot variety, can sometimes provide unwanted attention for the candidate's party, particularly if they become viable prospects for elections. For example, in the 2011 federal election, a sudden increase in opinion-poll support, particularly in Quebec, for the New Democratic Party, which historically had a minimal presence in that province, led to greater scrutiny of some of that party's lower-profile Quebec candidates. One such candidate, Ruth Ellen Brosseau, was working as a bartender hundreds of kilometres away from the riding of Berthier—Maskinongé where she was on the ballot. She won even though she had never been in her riding, claimed no expenses for her campaign, and spoke its dominant language (Canadian French) poorly. However, Brosseau successfully shook off the label by the time of the 2015 election, having become recognized as a hard-working MP who had built a significant base of popularity in her district. She was narrowly defeated in the 2019 and 2021 elections.

The federal Progressive Conservative Party also had several paper candidates who won election in the party's historic landslide victory in the 1984 election, such as Thomas Suluk in Nunatsiaq.

An extreme version of a paper candidate is a "Name on Ballot", often referred to by the acronym "NoB". Many NoBs (Names on Ballot) will only place campaign signs, and some do not even campaign at all. In most cases, the only requirement is that the candidate show up at the returning officer's headquarters for a few moments to take an oath and pay the required nomination deposit. In a more extreme example, in Alberta, candidates do not need to show up to talk to a returning officer, as long as someone on behalf of the party drops off the required paperwork and funds. Many smaller parties, such as the Prince Edward Island New Democrats, will field most of their candidates in any given election as NoBs. The term is often worn as a badge of pride in one's loyalty to the party. PEI New Democrat, Dr. Bob Perry, who has been a NoB many times in the past, often calls himself "Dr. NoB" at election time.

== See also ==
- Dummy candidate
- Lijstduwer
- Perennial candidate
- Stalking horse
- Star candidate
