= Proposed political status for Puerto Rico =

Proposed political status for Puerto Rico includes various ideas for the future of Puerto Rico, and there are differing points of view on whether Puerto Rico's political status as a territory of the United States should change.

Puerto Rico is a Caribbean island that was a colony of the Spanish Empire for about four centuries until it was ceded in the Treaty of Paris to the United States in 1898. Over the course of the 20th century, more rights were granted to the people, and especially important dates were 1917, when U.S. citizenship was granted, and the 1950s and 60s, when it became a commonwealth of the United States. Referendums in the 1960s and 1990s supported this as the will of the Puerto Rican people, and they maintain their own elected officials and a non-voting representative in Congress.

The U.S. has had many territories since its establishment, and currently there are 50 states, five inhabited territories, and one federal district. In the 21st century, the status quo was disrupted by a referendum in 2012 that tilted towards change, with one of the most favored options being statehood. Though questions have been asked about the referendums in 12 years, four referendums have all had statehood as the most favored option. The power to change its status lies in the United States Congress; a majority in both houses and the president signing it into law would make it possible. However, the changes would be dramatic, with Puerto Rico becoming fully integrated into the United States; it would gain two senators and several representatives and would vote in the presidential election. Several U.S. Presidents going back to Ronald Reagan have stated they support Puerto Rico's right to determine its future.

If it continues its current status, some changes are possible but difficult; for example, for Washington D.C. to vote in presidential elections, it took a constitutional amendment as it is not a state. Independence would have severe changes also; Puerto Rico would become a sovereign nation with no help from the United States and would no longer participate in U.S. politics; the people of Puerto Rico would cease to be U.S. citizens. Free association would result in independence also, but various economic benefits like visas, monetary aid, defense, or currency agreements would be negotiated between the two nations. There are three nations that maintain free association with the United States under the Compact of Free Association: Palau, Micronesia, and the Marshall Islands.

== Summary ==
Four major viewpoints emerge in principle: that Puerto Rico maintains its current status, becomes a U.S. state, becomes fully independent, or becomes a freely associated state.

Even though Puerto Rico was granted local autonomy in 1952, it remains a territory of the United States. On July 4, 1950, it was signed into law that Puerto Ricans could draft their own constitution establishing the Commonwealth of Puerto Rico. The U.S. Congress had granted commonwealth status on Puerto Rico that enhanced Puerto Rico's political status from protectorate to commonwealth. They would have their own elected governor and other representatives. For the next half a century this was satisfactory to both parties. However, the status continues to spark political debates which dominate Puerto Rican society. The debate over Puerto Rico has also been discussed at various UN hearings where it was declared a colony of the United States by the UN Special Committee on Decolonization at certain points but not others. For example, in 1952 it was removed from the colony list due to its Commonwealth freedoms after having been put on it after WW2. However, it was put back on the list since 1972 by the UN committee, pushing for its self-determination and even independence.

Various U.S. presidents have expressed themselves in favor of statehood but ultimately left the decision to Puerto Rico. President's Task Force on Puerto Rico's Status were published in 2005, 2007, and 2011. Nonbinding referendums regarding Puerto Rico's status have been held in 1967, 1993, 1998, 2012, 2017, 2020, and 2024.

The results of the referendums favored the current territorial status of Commonwealth territory, until 2012 when, for the first time, the majority of Puerto Ricans voted for Statehood as the preferred option (61%) of those vote. The results were highly controversial: many ballots were left blank and the results were criticized by several parties. The federal government provided funding for a subsequent referendum. In each successive referendum, Statehood has won including the latest in 2020 and 2024, with support ranging from about 60 to 90 percent. In the United States Congress this led to the Puerto Rico Status Act, which prepares the U.S. to support the island's decision.

In the past commonwealth status was more popular than statehood, but since 2012, Statehood has taken the lead. Results of official referendums of those voting Statehood are as follows: 1967 - 274,312 (39.0%),1993- 788,296 (46.3%),1998- 728,157 (46.49%), 2012- 834,191 (61.3%), 2017- 508,862 (97.2%), 2020- 655,505 (52.52%), and 2024 528,379 (56.82%) however in the 2024 the option to continue the Commonwealth was not included. Also, the 2017 vote was criticized for low voter turn out due to a political boycott.

To become a U.S. state, a bill must pass both houses of Congress with a simple majority and be signed into law by the U.S. President; one difference compared to other bills though is once passed it cannot be repealed. See also United States party politics and the political status of Puerto Rico.

== Background ==
Before 1898 Puerto Rico was a colonial possession of Spain; the main focus of this background is the 20th and 21st century in relation to the United States of America.

=== Prior to Jones Act ===
Puerto Rico became an American territory in 1898 when, as per the terms of the Treaty of Paris which concluded the Spanish–American War, Spain ceded the island (and several other possessions) to the United States.

The U.S. Congress enacted the Foraker Act (also known as the Organic Act of 1900) sponsored by Senator Joseph B. Foraker, signed by President McKinley on April 2, 1900. This act established a civil government and free commerce between Puerto Rico and the United States. The structure of the insular government included a governor appointed by the president, an executive council (the equivalent of a senate), and a legislature with 35 members, though the executive veto required a two-thirds vote to override. The first appointed civil governor, Charles Herbert Allen, was inaugurated on May 1, 1900.

On June 5, President McKinley appointed an Executive Council which included five Puerto Rican members and six U.S. members. The act also established the creation of a judicial system headed by the Supreme Court of Puerto Rico and allowed Puerto Rico to send a Resident Commissioner as a representative to Congress. The Department of Education was subsequently formed, headed by Dr. Martin Grove Brumbaugh (later governor of Pennsylvania). Teaching was conducted entirely in English with Spanish treated as a special subject. However, both Spanish and English were official languages in the island. On November 6, the first elections under the Foraker Act were held and on December 3, the first Legislative Assembly took office. Federico Degetau took office in Washington as the first Resident Commissioner from Puerto Rico on March 14, 1901.

=== Jones Act and the 1940s ===
The Jones Act was approved by the U.S. Congress on December 5, 1916, and signed into law by President Woodrow Wilson on March 2, 1917. The law made Puerto Rico a United States territory which is "organized but unincorporated." Puerto Ricans were also collectively given a restricted U.S. citizenship. This implied that Puerto Ricans in the island did not have full American citizenship rights, such as the right to vote for electors for the president of the United States. The act divided governmental powers into three branches: executive (appointed by the President of the United States), legislative (consisting of a 19-member senate and a 39-member house of representatives, all elected by the Puerto Rican people), and judicial. A bill of rights, which established elections to be held every four years, was also created. The act also made English the official language of the Puerto Rican courts. Section 27 of the Jones Acts deals with cabotage and requires that all goods by water between U.S. ports be carried in U.S.-flag ships, constructed in the United States, owned by U.S. citizens, and crewed by U.S. citizens and U.S. permanent residents. The act also allowed conscription to be extended to the island, and over 20,000 Puerto Rican soldiers were sent to the United States Army during the First World War.

In the years after World War II, social, political and economic changes began to take place that have continued to shape the island's character today. The late 1940s brought the beginning of a major migration to the continental United States, mainly to New York City, for work, and to remit money back to their families. The main reasons for this were an undesirable economic situation brought by the Great Depression, as well as heavy recruitment made by the U.S. armed forces and U.S. companies.

Political changes began in 1946 when President Harry Truman designated the first Puerto Rican, Commissioner Resident Jesús T. Piñero, to serve as the island's governor. On June 10, 1948, Piñero signed into law what became known as the Ley de la Mordaza (Gag Law), officially Law 53 of 1948, which started as a bill passed by the Puerto Rican legislature, presided by Luis Muñoz Marín, in May 1948. The new law made it illegal to display the Puerto Rican flag, sing a patriotic song, talk of independence or to fight for the liberation of the island. It resembled the anti-communist Smith Act passed in the United States in 1940.

In 1947, the U.S. Congress passed the Elective Governor Act, signed by President Truman, allowing Puerto Ricans to vote for their own governor, and the first elections under this act were held on November 2, 1948. Luis Muñoz Marín, president of the Puerto Rican Senate, successfully campaigned and became the first democratically elected Governor of the island on January 2, 1949.

=== 1950s to present-day ===
Puerto Rico continues to struggle to define its political status.

==== Operation Bootstrap ====
In 1950, Washington introduced Operation Bootstrap, an attempt to transform Puerto Rico's economy to an industrialized and developed one, which greatly stimulated economic growth from 1950 until the 1970s. Due to billions of dollars of corporate investments, the growth rate was 6% for the 1950s, 5% for the 1960s, and 4% for the 1970s. Puerto Rico became one of the most affluent economies in Latin America. But it had to import 80% of its food.

Operation Bootstrap was sponsored by governor Muñoz Marín. It was coupled with agrarian reform (land redistribution) that limited the area that could be held by large sugarcane interests. Operation Bootstrap enticed U.S. mainland investors to transfer or create manufacturing plants by granting them local and federal tax concessions, but maintaining the access to mainland markets free of import duties. Another incentive was the lower wage scales in the densely populated island. The program accelerated the shift from an agricultural to an industrial society. The 1950s saw the development of labor-intensive light industries, such as textiles; later, manufacturing gave way to heavy industry, such as petrochemicals and oil refining, in the 1960s and 1970s. Muñoz Marín's development programs brought some prosperity for an emergent middle class. The industrialization was in part fueled by generous local incentives and freedom from federal taxation, while providing access to continental U.S. markets without import duties. As a result, a rural agricultural society was transformed into an industrial working class.

==== Commonwealth status ====
On July 4, 1950, President Harry S. Truman signed Public Act 600, which allowed Puerto Ricans to draft their own constitution establishing the Commonwealth of Puerto Rico. The U.S. Congress had granted commonwealth status on Puerto Rico that enhanced Puerto Rico's political status from protectorate to commonwealth. This, coupled with Muñoz Marín's reversal on not pursuing Puerto Rican Independence angered some Puerto Ricans.

On July 25, 1952, the Constitution of Puerto Rico was approved by voters in a referendum, and the island organized as the Estado Libre Asociado (Commonwealth of Puerto Rico). That same year marked the first time that the Flag of Puerto Rico could be publicly displayed.

Puerto Ricans and other U.S. citizens residing in Puerto Rico cannot vote in presidential elections as that is a right reserved by the U.S. Constitution to admitted states and the District of Columbia through the Electoral College system. Nevertheless, both the Democratic Party and Republican Party, while not fielding candidates for public office in Puerto Rico, provide the islands with state-sized voting delegations at their presidential nominating conventions. Delegate selection processes frequently have resulted in presidential primaries being held in Puerto Rico. U.S. Citizens residing in Puerto Rico do not elect U.S. Representatives or Senators, however, Puerto Rico is represented in the House of Representatives by an elected representative commonly known as the Resident Commissioner, who has the same duties and obligations as a representative, with the exception of being able to cast votes on the final disposition of legislation on the House floor. The Resident Commissioner is elected by Puerto Ricans to a four-year term and does serve on congressional committee. Puerto Ricans residing in the U.S. states have all rights and privileges of other U.S. citizens living in the states.

=== President's Task Force on Puerto Rico's Status ===
Several U.S. presidents have signed executive orders to define, study, and initiate activities regarding the political status of Puerto Rico. the three reports of 2005, 2007, 2011, indicate in particular:

According to the 2005 Report of the President's George HW Bush Task Force on Puerto Rico, it contained this clear statement about the relationship between the United States and Puerto Rico:

“The Federal Government may surrender U.S. sovereignty by granting independence or ceding territory to another nation; or it may, as provided for in the Constitution, admit a territory as a state, thereby rendering the Territory Clause inapplicable. The U.S. Constitution allows no other options.” [As an Enhanced Commonwealth]

Ceding territory to another nation only means giving Puerto Rico away or selling it, as happened in 1898 from Spain to the United States. Congress can give Puerto Rico away, sell it, exchange it, or simply give it independence or statehood.

In the 2007 Report of the President's Task Force on Puerto Rico, he expressed it again with the same clarity:

“The plenary authority of Congress over a non-state area shall last as long as the area retains that status. It terminates when the area loses that status either by virtue of its admission as a state, or by the termination of United States sovereignty over the area by the grant of independence, or by its surrender to the sovereignty of another country.”

In other words, Congress could give Puerto Rico away to whomever it wanted, approve the territory's independence without the consent of Puerto Ricans, or admit it as a state.

Cuba - It was handed over to the United States and not to the native forces that aspired to independence, after the end of the Spanish-American War in 1898. Philippines, Guam, and Puerto Rico - Sold to the United States in 1898 at the end of the war, for $20,000,000.

On the other hand, the Task Force of President Barack Obama, 2011, provides the same, but adds the parameters for Free Association:

"Free Association would provide for an independent Puerto Rico with a close relationship to the United States, similar in status to the Republic of the Marshall Islands, the Federated States of Micronesia, and the Republic of Palau. The United States provides defense and various forms of economic assistance to these countries and exercises control over their defense and security policies. Their citizens may work and attend schools in the United States, but are not U.S. citizens".

There is nothing that the U.S. Congress cannot do with Puerto Rico, whether it be unilaterally granting independence, statehood, independence with a Free Association, selling, or giving away the island of Puerto Rico to another country. The only thing that is unconstitutional is the enhanced commonwealth; Obama states on page 24 that the Unincorporated Territory does not admit changes, it is what it is. When Washington, D.C., the Federal District was granted presidential voting rights in 1961, see District of Columbia federal voting rights, it took the Twenty-third Amendment to the United States Constitution to make it legal.

President Trump's statement on Puerto Rico in 2016 was, "There are 3.7 million American citizens living in Puerto Rico. As citizens, they should be entitled to determine for themselves their political status. I am firmly committed to the process where Puerto Ricans might resolve their status according to Constitutional and Congressional protocols. I believe the people of Puerto Rico deserve a process of status self-determination that gives them a fair and unambiguous choice on this matter. As president I will do my part to insure that Congress follows the Constitution. The will of the Puerto Rican people in any status referendum should be considered as Congress follows through on any desired change in status for Puerto Rico, including statehood."

==== Three 20th century referendums ====
On July 23, 1967, the first plebiscite on the political status of Puerto Rico was held. Voters overwhelmingly affirmed continuation of Commonwealth status (with 60.4% voting to remain a commonwealth, 39% voting to work towards statehood, and 0.6% wishing for independence). Other referendums have been held to determine the political status of Puerto Rico, in 1993 and in 1998. Both times, although by smaller margins, the status quo was upheld.

==== 2012 referendum ====
Following the recommendations of the President's Task Force on Puerto Rico's Status reports, in October 2011, Governor Luis Fortuño set August 12, 2012 as the date to hold the first part of a two-step status plebiscite. The first question was whether voters want to maintain the current commonwealth status under the territorial clause of the U.S. Constitution or whether they prefer a non-territorial option. The second question presented three status options: statehood, independence or free association. Each option was to be an internationally recognized, constitutionally viable, non-territorial alternative to the current territory status. A bill was brought before the Legislative Assembly of Puerto Rico in 2011 to effect the governor's proposal. The bill passed on December 28, 2011.

In the event, both referendum questions were placed on a single ballot for voting on November 6, 2012. The New Progressive Party of Puerto Rico endorsed statehood. The Popular Democratic Party of Puerto Rico endorsed the current Commonwealth position; it called for abstention in the second question. The Puerto Rico Independence Party endorsed the independence position.

During the 2012 U.S. presidential campaign, leading candidates for both major parties said they supported the referendum process. Former Massachusetts governor Mitt Romney said: "I will support the people of Puerto Rico if they make a decision that they would prefer to become a state; that's a decision that I will support. I don't have preconditions that I would impose." President Barack Obama had also supported the referendum, writing, "I am firmly committed to the principle that the question of political status is a matter of self-determination for the people of Puerto Rico."

The fourth Puerto Rico statehood referendum occurred on November 6, 2012. The result a 54% majority of the ballots cast against the continuation of the island's territorial political status, and in favor of a new status. Of votes for new status, a 61.1% majority chose statehood. This was by far the most successful referendum for statehood advocates. In all earlier referendums, votes for statehood were matched almost equally by votes for remaining an American territory, with the remainder for independence. Support for U.S. statehood has risen in each successive popular referendum.

Because there were almost 500,000 blank ballots in the 2012 referendum, creating confusion as to the voters' true desire, Congress decided to ignore the vote but provided funding for a future referendum.

==== 2017 referendum ====
The previous plebiscites provided voters with three options: statehood, free association/independence and maintaining the current status. The 2017 plebiscite was to offer only two: Statehood and Independence/Free Association. If the majority vote for the latter, a second vote will be held to determine the preference: full independence as a nation or associated free state status with independence but with a "free and voluntary political association" between Puerto Rico and the United States.

Governor Ricardo Rosselló is strongly in favor of statehood to help develop the economy and help to "solve our 500-year-old colonial dilemma ... Colonialism is not an option ... It's a civil rights issue ... 3.5 million citizens seeking an absolute democracy," he told the news media. Benefits of statehood include an additional $10 billion per year in federal funds, the right to vote in presidential elections, higher Social Security and Medicare benefits, and a right for its government agencies and municipalities to file for bankruptcy. The latter is currently prohibited.

If the majority favor free association with the U.S. a Compact of Free Association would be negotiated, covering topics such as the role of the U.S. military in Puerto Rico, the use of the U.S. currency, free trade between the two entities, and whether Puerto Ricans would be U.S. citizens.

Statehood might be useful as a means of dealing with Puerto Rico's financial crisis, since it would allow for bankruptcy and the relevant protection. According to the Government Development Bank, this might be the only solution to the debt crisis. Congress has the power to vote to allow Chapter 9 protection without the need for statehood, but in late 2015 there was very little support in the House for this concept. Other benefits to statehood include increased disability benefits and Medicaid funding, the right to vote in Presidential elections and the higher (federal) minimum wage.

At approximately the same time as the referendum, Puerto Rico's legislators are also expected to vote on a bill that would allow the Governor to draft a state constitution and hold elections to choose senators and representatives to the federal Congress. Regardless of the outcome of the referendum, action by the United States Congress would be necessary to implement changes to the status of Puerto Rico under the Territorial Clause of the United States Constitution.

==== 2018 Puerto Rico Admission Act ====
In 2018, the 2018 Puerto Rico Admission Act was introduced to United States Congress. The bill was introduced to U.S. Congress by Jenniffer González Colón, and had 34 co-sponsors; it would have mandated the PR becoming a state of the Union by start of 2021.

==== 2020 referendum ====
Color-shaded map of the results of the 2020 referendum, which had two choices

A yes-no vote on statehood was held on November 3, 2020. It had not been approved by the U.S. Justice Department, but it did not have to be. Congresswomen Nydia Velázquez (D-NY) and Alexandria Ocasio-Cortez (D-NY) proposed on August 25, 2020 that the question of Puerto Rico's political status should be decided by a convention rather than a referendum. Velázquez and Ocasio-Cortez wrote: "Many in Puerto Rico would view Congress pushing statehood not as an end to colonization, but the culmination of it." Resident Commissioner Jenniffer González-Colón (R) replied on Twitter, "The people's decision is through everyone's vote, not a meeting of the few. Puerto Rico has voted three consecutive times for statehood and it's our tough reality that it's up to Congress to act."

==== 2024 referendum ====
Another status referendum was scheduled for November 5, 2024, alongside the 2024 Puerto Rican general election and the 2024 United States elections.

The non-binding referendum had three choices: statehood, independence, and independence with free association. The top choice was 57% voted for Statehood from 528,000 votes. To become a U.S. State, U.S. Congress must pass a bill and have it signed by the President and the bill cannot be repealed. There have now been four referendums in 12 years in favor of statehood, though the latest poll did not include the option to continue the Commonwealth, it was considered that those who wanted that, or another option did not have to vote on any of those choices.

== Options for political status ==
Plebiscites on the status issue have presented the people of Puerto Rico these options:

=== Commonwealth (current status) ===
This is the status for Puerto Rico in June 2017 and the next referendum was not originally to offer this as an option for voters.

As a Commonwealth, Puerto Rico receives less in federal funding than the states. It receives lower Social Security and Medicare benefits. Neither the Commonwealth nor municipal governments of Puerto Rico can file for bankruptcy; that is currently prohibited.

Puerto Ricans and other U.S. citizens residing in Puerto Rico cannot vote in presidential elections as that is a right reserved by the U.S. Constitution to admitted states and the District of Columbia through the Electoral College system. Nevertheless, both the Democratic Party and Republican Party, while not fielding candidates for public office in Puerto Rico, provide the islands with state-sized voting delegations at their presidential nominating conventions. Delegate selection processes frequently have resulted in presidential primaries being held in Puerto Rico. U.S. Citizens residing in Puerto Rico do not elect U.S. Representatives or Senators, however, Puerto Rico is represented in the House of Representatives by an elected representative commonly known as the Resident Commissioner, who has the same duties and obligations as a representative, with the exception of being able to cast votes on the final disposition of legislation on the House floor. The Resident Commissioner is elected by Puerto Ricans to a four-year term and does serve on a congressional committee. Puerto Ricans residing in the U.S. states have all rights and privileges of other U.S. citizens living in the states.

In the Puerto Rican status referendum, 2012, 54% of the ballots cast were against the continuation of the island's status as a territory of the U.S. Of the votes for new status, a 61.1% majority chose statehood. This was by far the most successful referendum for statehood advocates. In all earlier referendums, votes for statehood were matched almost equally by votes for remaining an American territory, with the remainder for independence. Support for U.S. statehood has risen in each successive popular referendum. The Puerto Rican status referendum, 2017 was held on June 11, 2017, and offered three options: "Statehood", "Independence/Free Association" and the current status as a Commonwealth. It was originally to be the first referendum not to offer the choice of retaining the current status as a Commonwealth until early 2017. Those who voted overwhelmingly chose statehood by 97%; turnout, however, was 23%, a historically low figure. Action by the United States Congress would be necessary to implement changes to the status of Puerto Rico under the Territorial Clause of the United States Constitution. On December 15, 2022, the U.S. House of Representatives voted in favor of the Puerto Rico Status Act. The act sought to resolve Puerto Rico's status and its relationship to the United States through a binding plebiscite. In April 2023, Puerto Rico's Status Act was reintroduced in the House by Democrats.

In September 2023, Roger Wicker reintroduced legislation in the United States Congress on the territorial status of Puerto Rico. In a two-round consultation process, Wicker proposed a vote scheduled for August 4, 2024, where Puerto Ricans would have the choice between four alternatives: annexation to the United States, independence, sovereignty in free association, and a free state associated with the United States.

In July 2024, Governor Pedro Pierluisi calls a plebiscite on the status of Puerto Rico in November 2024, for the first time the island's current status as a U.S. territory will not be an option during the non-binding plebiscite. The executive order follows the U.S. House of Representatives' 2022 approval of a bill to help Puerto Rico move toward a change in territorial status. voters are given the choice of statehood, independence, or independence with free association, the terms of which would be negotiated regarding foreign affairs, U.S. citizenship, and use of the U.S. dollar.

=== Statehood ===
Here is a notional design for a 51 Star flag. It is necessary to add a star to the U.S. flag for each new State of the Union, though older flags do not become illegal when this happens.

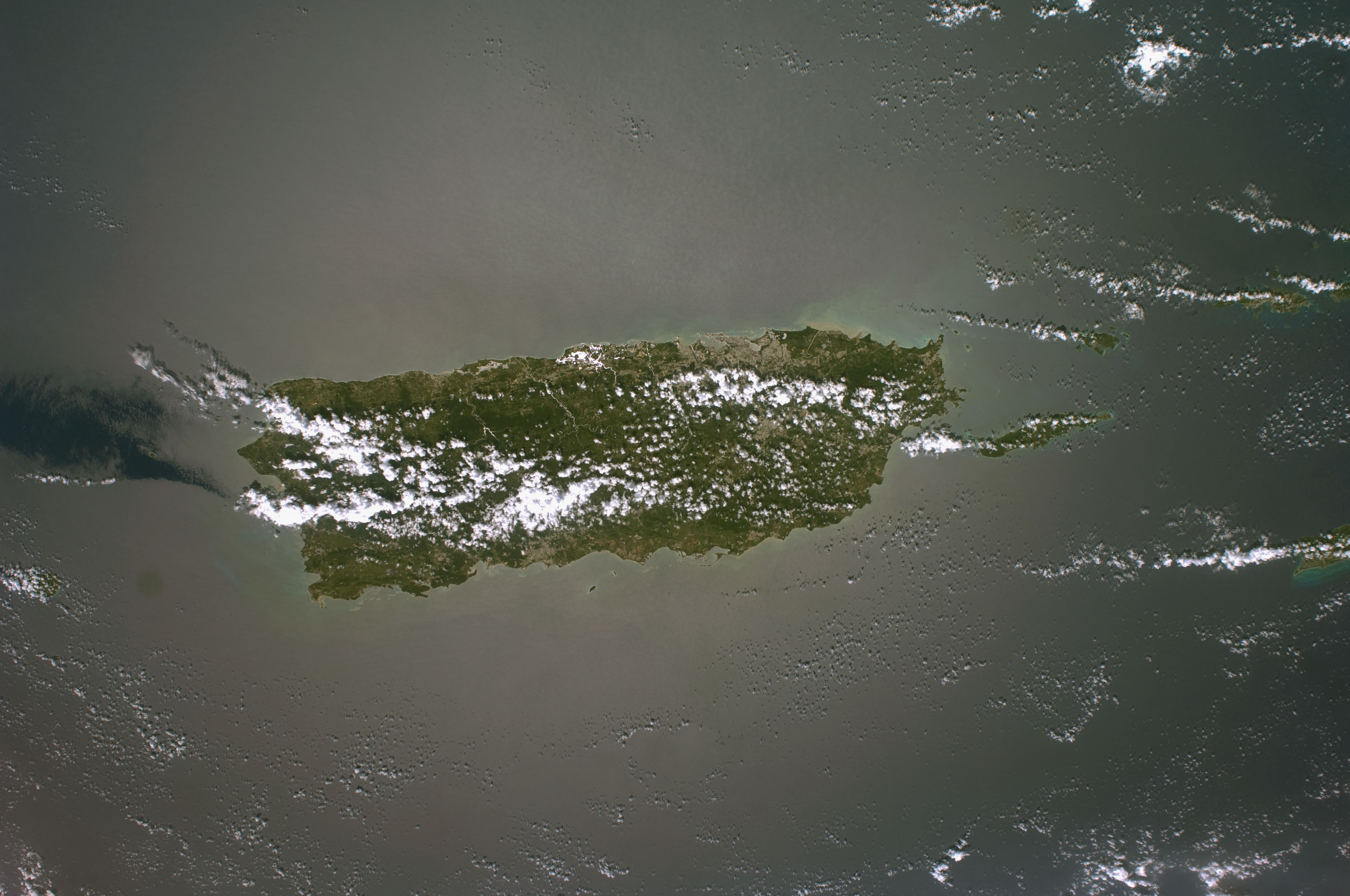
Puerto Rico from space: As a U.S. State it would be bigger than Rhode island or Delaware, but smaller than Connecticut.

If this status were granted, Puerto Rico would become the 51st state of the United States. The state would have due representation in the United States Congress with full voting rights; Puerto Rico would be represented in the Senate by two senators, and the size of its delegation to the House of Representatives would be determined by its population (Utah, which has a similar population, currently has four representatives). Similarly, Puerto Rico would get a population-dependent number of electors to the electoral college for the Presidency (cf. Utah's current six electors). The apportionment of federal aid to the island would be handled as for other states (increased).

The outcome of the referendum will not offer any benefit unless the U.S. Congress agrees to implement the change desired by Puerto Ricans.

The impact of PR joining as a U.S. state depends in part on decisions made by U.S. Congress and Puerto Rico. In 2017, when it had a population of 3.4 million, this would be about 5 seats in the house. That means other states would have to give up seats unless Congress increased the number of seats. The number of seats is capped at 435 for the last century, though it was briefly 437 when Alaska and Hawaii joined the Union in the late 1950s. In the Senate, PR would have two voting members of Congress. The combination of House and Senate, in turn, affects the electoral college, which would have an increased number depending on whether the seats were replaced or added. In one situation, PR could get 5-7 seats and Congress could either add to 435 for a total of 440-442 seats or replace other States' representatives; the total number of senators would increase to 102, with two for Puerto Rico; then the electoral number could be seven, making the number to win the presidential race 271 and not 270, but it would depend on choices made by Congress because there are complex legalities that decide the numbers of representatives and electoral votes in the Presidential race.

Admission to statehood in the United States of America is controlled by the U.S. Congress, requiring a bill to pass a majority vote in the House and Senate and be signed into law by the President. This means that other state governments have no power to block such a statehood bill except in situations where part of their own state territory is being divided or transferred to create the new state, which would not be applicable in Puerto Rico's case as its pre-existing boundaries would be retained unchanged if it were to become a state.

Though population varies, in 2017 it was about 3.4 million people which would make it about population of Iowa or Connecticut, while in terms of land area it is bigger than only Rhode Island and Delaware. Economically in 2017, its GDP was over 100 billion USD which would place it between Mississippi and New Mexico at that time.

It is about a two-three hour flight to Miami, and geographically is between Florida and the U.S. Virgin Islands, another U.S. territory, which was bought from Denmark in 1917.

The coastline of PR is as big as some larger states however, at 700 mi (1,100 km), which places it between Wisconsin and Connecticut, though Puerto Rico is only a little smaller than Connecticut in land area.

=== Independence with free association agreement ===
If the majority of Puerto Ricans were to choose this option - and only 33% voted for it in 2012 - and if it were granted by the U.S. Congress, Puerto Rico would become a Free Associated State. This could give Puerto Rico a similar status to Micronesia, the Marshall Islands, and Palau, countries which currently have a Compact of Free Association with the United States.

The White House Task Force on Puerto Rico offers the following specifics: "Free Association is a type of independence. A compact of Free Association would establish a mutual agreement that would recognize that the United States and Puerto Rico are closely linked in specific ways as detailed in the compact. Compacts of this sort are based on the national sovereignty of each country, and either nation can unilaterally terminate the association."

The specifics of the association agreement would be detailed in the Compact of Free Association that would be negotiated between the U.S. and Puerto Rico. That document might cover topics such as the role of the U.S. military in Puerto Rico, the use of the U.S. currency, free trade between the two entities, and whether Puerto Ricans would be U.S. citizens.

The three current Free Associated States use the American dollar, receive some financial support and the promise of military defense if they refuse military access to any other country. Their citizens are allowed to work in the U.S. and serve in its military. Their agreements with the U.S. must be renegotiated from time to time (such as every 15 years). One report states that "the amounts of financial support ... have been reduced at each renegotiation, and movement toward complete independence is often encouraged". If an FAS is unable to reach a mutually-acceptable agreement on the conditions, it would have no alternative but to become a totally independent nation.

=== Independence ===
Grito de Lares flag, commonly associated with the independence movement

Should Puerto Rico become fully independent, it would be a sovereign nation, with an independent judiciary and full control over domestic and foreign policy. Relations with the U.S. would be a matter of foreign policy. The U.S. would have no formal obligations to Puerto Rico and its citizens (and vice versa), other than those agreed by bilateral agreements of both nations.

=== Reunification with Spain ===
1873 Flag of the Province of Puerto Rico, appropriated by the Spanish reunification movement

This option calls for Puerto Rico to become part of Spain once again as an autonomous community, such as the Canary Islands. Many Puerto Ricans recently requested Spanish Citizenship per the Historical Memory Law. In addition, becoming part of Spain again would allow Puerto Ricans to move to the European Union per the European Union citizenship.

=== Former option for an Antillean Confederation ===
This option was very popular with Puerto Rican Political leaders of the late nineteenth century. It involved Puerto Rico with Cuba and the Dominican Republic joining and becoming a confederation. There are still a few supporters of this option in the island.

=== United States trades Puerto Rico for Greenland ===
Ron Lauder suggested to Donald Trump that the United States purchase Greenland which was discussed in the White House Situation Room as a trade involving Puerto Rico according to Elizabeth Neumann.

== United Nations Special Committee on Decolonization ==
Since 1953, the UN has been considering the Political status of Puerto Rico and how to assist it in achieving "independence" or "decolonization". In 1978, the Special Committee determined that a "colonial relationship" existed between the U.S. and Puerto Rico.

Note that the United Nations Special Committee on Decolonization has referred to Puerto Rico as a nation in its reports, because, internationally, the people of Puerto Rico are often considered to be a Caribbean nation with their own national identity. Most recently, in a June 2016 report, the Special Committee called for the United States to expedite the process to allow self-determination in Puerto Rico. More specifically, the group called on the United States to expedite a process that would allow the people of Puerto Rico to exercise fully their right to self-determination and independence. ... [and] allow the Puerto Rican people to take decisions in a sovereign manner and to address their urgent economic and social needs, including unemployment, marginalization, insolvency and poverty".

In June 2025, the United Nations adopted a resolution in favor of self-determination and independence for the state of Puerto Rico.

== See also ==
- Puerto Rico
- Puerto Rico statehood movement
- Puerto Rico Democracy Act of 2007 (H.R. 900 & S. 1936)
- Puerto Rican citizenship
- Territories of the United States
- Voting rights in Puerto Rico
- Sovereigntism (Puerto Rico)
- Political status of Puerto Rico
- Special Committee on Decolonization
- United Nations list of non-self-governing territories
- Politics of Puerto Rico
- History of Puerto Rico
- Puerto Ricans
- Puerto Rican status referendum, 2012
- Puerto Rican status referendum, 2017
- Puerto Rican status referendum, 2020
- Puerto Rican status referendum, 2024
