= Puerto Rican status referendum =

Puerto Rican status referendum may refer to:

- 1967 Puerto Rican status referendum
- 1993 Puerto Rican status referendum
- 1998 Puerto Rican status referendum
- 2012 Puerto Rican status referendum
- 2017 Puerto Rican status referendum
- 2020 Puerto Rican status referendum
- 2024 Puerto Rican status referendum

== See also ==
- Puerto Rico status referendums
