= 2020 Puerto Rican status referendum =

Referendum on becoming a US state

- November 3, 2020
- Should Puerto Rico be admitted immediately into the Union as a State?

Results
Choice	Votes	%
Yes	655,505	52.52%
No	592,671	47.48%
Valid votes	1,248,176	96.82%
Invalid or blank votes	40,959	3.18%
Total votes	1,289,135	100.00%
Registered voters/turnout	2,355,894	54.72%
- Results by municipality

A referendum of the status of Puerto Rico was held on November 3, 2020, concurrently with the general election. The Referendum was announced by Puerto Rico Governor Wanda Vázquez Garced on May 16, 2020. This was the sixth referendum held on the status of Puerto Rico, with the previous one having taken place in 2017. This was the first referendum with a simple yes-or-no question, with voters having the option of voting for or against becoming a U.S. state. The New Progressive Party (PNP), of whom Vázquez is a member, supports statehood, while the opposition Popular Democratic Party (PDP) and Puerto Rican Independence Party (PIP) oppose it.

The referendum was non-binding, as the power to grant statehood lies with the US Congress. The referendum was not approved by the US Department of Justice under the Trump administration. The party platforms of both the Republican Party and the Democratic Party have affirmed for decades Puerto Rico's right to self-determination and to be admitted as a state, at least in theory, but individual Republican legislators have been more skeptical. For example, then Republican Senate Majority Leader Mitch McConnell in 2019 refused to allow a statehood vote in the Senate and called statehood for Puerto Rico "government overreach."

The vote was therefore largely symbolic, but the option to pursue statehood won the referendum with 52% of the vote.

== Background ==
Calls for autonomy have occurred since Puerto Rico was ceded by Spain to the United States in 1898. In 1917, statutory U.S. citizenship was extended to most Puerto Ricans, although the law could be repealed by a future United States Congress. Citizenship by birthright was established by the Nationality Act of 1940. In 1952, Puerto Rico adopted a new constitution which designated it as the "Commonwealth of Puerto Rico". Today, while Puerto Ricans are U.S. citizens and subject to federal laws, those in the unincorporated territory are unable to vote in Presidential elections, and the unincorporated territory does not have a representative vote in Congress.

The lack of statehood is sometimes regarded as exacerbating the impact of natural disasters and the territory's economic crisis. This referendum follows a period of political upheaval in Puerto Rico, where an economic crisis and damage from a series of hurricanes contributed to protests that brought about the resignation of previous Governor Ricardo Rosselló in July 2019.

A 2019 Gallup poll found 83% of Democrats in the US, but only 35% of Republicans, supported Puerto Rican statehood. A 2020 survey by International Policy Digest found that "The majority of Democrats showed support for statehood for both D.C. (61.8%) and Puerto Rico (69.7%)" while among Republicans, only 26.7% supported D.C. statehood and 34.8% supported Puerto Rican statehood.

=== Previous referendums ===
Puerto Rico has had five previous referendums on its status. A vote in 1967 rejected statehood, with the commonwealth status option receiving the most votes. The next three referendums produced no clear majorities, with the commonwealth option receiving the most votes in 1993 and the none of the above option being the most popular option in 1998. The two-party referendum in 2012 saw a majority vote in favour of a change in the status quo and for statehood, but the way the ballot was introduced created doubt in Congress. A non-binding 2017 referendum was in favor of statehood, but had only a 23% turnout.

== Campaign ==
On May 16, 2020, Puerto Rico Governor Wanda Vázquez Garced announced that a referendum on statehood would take place in November 2020 alongside the gubernatorial election and other elections taking place on that day. In response to the announcement, PDP member Roberto Prats stated that unilateral referendums are pointless, and status referendums should take place in cooperation with the U.S. Congress. Former PPD governor Anibal Acevedo Vila called it a "sham". Analysts have suggested the referendum was called to drive turnout for Vázquez and her PNP party in the election, shifting attention away from the difficulties Puerto Rico had faced in the recent past.

Under a 2014 law, the Puerto Rico State Commission on Elections (CEE) receives $2.5 million from the federal government for any referendum approved by the Justice Department on the topic of the territory's status. It is thought that the overall cost of the upcoming referendum will be $3.5 million. However, on July 29, 2020, the US Justice Department informed Puerto Rico's CEE that it would not be approving the referendum, meaning all funding will need to be handled by the Puerto Rican government. One reason given for the rejection was there being no option to vote for continuing to be a territory.

On August 16, Vázquez lost her party's primary to Pedro Pierluisi, who thus became the PNP candidate for Governor. Pierluisi declared that achieving statehood would be his top priority if he was elected.

== Question ==
The referendum asked one yes-or-no question:

"¿Debe Puerto Rico ser admitido inmediatamente dentro de la Unión como un Estado?" Sí No
"Should Puerto Rico be admitted immediately into the Union as a State?" Yes No

This wording imitates the wording used in the successful statehood referendums of Alaska and Hawaii. It was Puerto Rico's first status referendum to ask one simple question; previous referendums posed multiple questions or provided more than two possible answers to questions.

== Reactions ==
A White House official responded to the announcement of the referendum, stating "The first priority for all Puerto Rico leaders should be getting their financial house in order". Republican members of Congress have come out against statehood; with Senate Majority Leader Mitch McConnell saying that he would not bring statehood to a vote in the Senate and that statehood for Puerto Rico was "another example of government overreach." Republican Senator for Arizona Martha McSally came out against statehood on a partisan basis, asserting that it would lead to more Democratic Party senators, despite the fact that Puerto Rico had several territory-wide offices held by Republicans at the time. On July 28, Jenniffer González, a Republican who serves as the non-voting representative of Puerto Rico in Congress, spoke to the United States House Administration Subcommittee on Elections and reiterated her previous support for statehood. Florida Senator Marco Rubio has expressed his support for a "Yes" vote.

As the Democratic Party presidential candidate, President Joe Biden indicated he believed statehood "would be the most effective means of ensuring that residents of Puerto Rico are treated equally, with equal representation on a federal level", but has written that Puerto Ricans have a right to self-determination; the Democratic Party's 2020 platform, which was voted upon in August, similarly expresses support for Puerto Ricans to determine whether the archipelago should become a state. The related issue of D.C. statehood was supported by the Democratic 2020 platform and by Biden, while having less support among the wider public than Puerto Rican statehood. Following the passing of a bill in the U.S. House of Representatives calling for D.C. Statehood, the Pennsylvania Democratic State Committee called for federal legislators to support similar measures for Puerto Rico, and acknowledge the upcoming referendum. On July 30, former President Barack Obama called for citizens in Puerto Rico and D.C. to have "equal representation in our government".

== Opinion polls ==
Poll source	Date(s) administered	Sample size (Note: Key: A – all adults RV – registered voters LV – likely voters V – unclear)	Margin of error	Yes	No	Other / Undecided
Jorge Benítez Nazario/Radio Isla/Telemundo Puerto Rico	October 23–November 1, 2020	1,010 (LV)	± 2.5%	49.5%	50.5%	–
The Research Office/El Nuevo Día	October 27–30, 2020	1000 (RV)	± 3%	50%	43%	7% (Note: Would not vote with 3%; Undecided with 4%)
Pasquines	October 3–27, 2020	~249 (A)	–	70%	30%	–
Radio Isla/Jorge Benítez	October 12–17, 2020	676 (RV)	± 3.16%	43%	42%	18% (Note: Undecided with 18%)
Gaither International/El Vocero	September 21 – October 6, 2020	2,041 (A)	± 2%	42%	27%	31% (Note: Would not vote with 14%; Undecided with 17%)
Beacon Research/Puerto Rico Herald	September 14–18, 2020	803 (V)	± 3.5%	53%	35%	12% (Note: Would not vote with 4%; "Refused" with 1%; Undecided with 7%)
Beacon Research/Puerto Rico Herald	July 20–26, 2020	802 (V)	± 3.5%	54%	33%	14% (Note: Would not vote with 4%; "Refused" with 2%; Undecided with 8%)
Beacon Research/Puerto Rico Herald	May 3–7, 2020	903 (LV)	–	36%	8%	56% (Note: Would not vote with 39%; "Undecided/Refused" with 15%)
Beacon Research/Puerto Rico Herald	March, 2020	– (V) (Note: Not yet released)	–	31%	12%	58% (Note: Would not vote with 39%; "Undecided/Refused" with 18%)
Beacon Research/Puerto Rico Herald	February, 2020	– (V) (Note: Not yet released)	–	39%	13%	48% (Note: Would not vote with 31%; "Undecided/Refused" with 17%)
Beacon Research/Puerto Rico Herald	November, 2019	– (V) (Note: Not yet released)	–	39%	13%	48% (Note: Would not vote with 33%; "Undecided/Refused" with 15%)

=== Pre-referendum polling ===
Three-way polling

Poll source	Date(s) administered	Sample size	Margin of error	Statehood	Status quo	Independence	Other / Undecided
Puerto Rico Herald	May 29 – June 3, 2019	801 (V)	±3.5%	48%	22%	22%	8%
Washington Post/KFF	July 3 – August 29, 2018	1500 (A)	±3.5%	48%	26%	10%	16%
Puerto Rico Herald	June 19 – 25, 2018	801 (V)	±3.5%	57%	17%	15%	11%

Four-way polling

Poll source	Date(s) administered	Sample size	Margin of error	Statehood	Status quo	Independence	Free association	Other / Undecided
Diario Las Américas	March 30 – April 21, 2020	1500 (RV)	±2.6%	43%	21%	15%	14%	7%

== Result ==
Detailed map of 2020 Puerto Rico Status Referendum by municipality

Choice	Votes	%
Yes	655,505	52.52
No	592,671	47.48
Total	1,248,176	100.00
Valid votes	1,248,176	96.82
Invalid/blank votes	40,959	3.18
Total votes	1,289,135	100.00
Registered voters/turnout	2,355,894	54.72

== Aftermath ==
The referendum was non-binding, since the power to grant statehood lies with the U.S. Congress rather than Puerto Rico. If Puerto Rico became a state, it would be expected to have two senators, four representatives in the U.S. House, and six electoral college votes.

On March 3, 2021, Congressman Darren Soto and Commissioner González-Colón introduced H.R. 1522 titled "Puerto Rico Statehood Admission Act of 2021" with 57 bipartisan co-sponsors. On March 16, Senator Martin Heinrich, with 3 co-sponsors, introduced the same bill in the Senate as S. 780 a bill similar to the Admission Act of the states of Hawaii and Alaska in which it presents the transition period and a ratification vote for Statehood acting upon the results of the referendum held in November 2020, it brought mixed responses from the political spectrum including the support of Majority Leader of the House Steny Hoyer in which he in a retweet to Rep. Darren Soto made clear support of the Bill and would work with him to pass the bill. President Biden's Press Secretary Jen Psaki reacted, saying that he supported a referendum on statehood but not directly supporting the bill. On the island the PNP and local statehood organizations supported this bill.

On March 18, Congresswomen Nydia Velázquez and Alexandria Ocasio-Cortez introduced H.R. 2070, the "Puerto Rico Self-Determination Act of 2021" with 73 partisan co-sponsors, that same day Senator Bob Menendez with 7 co-sponsors including fellow Senators Bernie Sanders, Elizabeth Warren and Cory Booker introduced the same bill to the Senate as S. 865. Disregarding the November 2020 vote, the Senate bill called for the introduction of a "Status Convention" that would have given a path for the U.S. citizens of Puerto Rico to elect delegates to a special assembly to formulate a ballot with non-territorial status options which was to be presented to the people of Puerto Rico to vote on. Regardless of the vote, the convention was to work with a special joint congress committee in which they would have appointed members that come from the states with the biggest Puerto Rican populations to "determine the path to decolonization". This bill was supported by the Puerto Rico Independence Party, Citizens Victory Movement, and some members of the Popular Democratic Party, but was rejected by the pro-commonwealth status wing of the PDP and the New Progressive Party.

On December 15, 2022, H.R. 8393 (the Puerto Rico Status Act) passed the House of Representatives 233–191. It would institute a binding referendum that would allow Puerto Ricans to vote on the future status of the island, that Congress would have to obey. Every Democrat voted in favor of the bill, and were joined by 16 Republicans.

Another status referendum was held on November 5, 2024, alongside the 2024 Puerto Rican general election and the 2024 United States elections. Statehood was the most popular choice, with 59% of the valid vote in what was again a largely symbolic referendum.

== See also ==
- 51st state
- District of Columbia statehood movement
- Hawaii Admission Act, the last act of admission of a US state (1959)
