= 2017 independence referendum =

There have been several referendums on independence in 2017:

- 2017 Iraqi Kurdistan independence referendum
- 2017 Catalan independence referendum
- 2017 Puerto Rican status referendum

== See also ==
- Independence referendum
