= 2017 Puerto Rican status referendum =

In support of becoming a U.S. state

- June 11, 2017

Results
Statehood	97.13%
Independence/Free Association	1.52%
Current Territorial Status	1.35%

A referendum on the political status of Puerto Rico was held in Puerto Rico on June 11, 2017. The referendum had three options: becoming a state of the United States, independence/free association, or maintaining the current territorial status. Those who voted overwhelmingly chose statehood with 97%. This figure is attributed to a boycott led by the pro-status quo PPD party, which resulted in a 22.93% turnout.

Four previous referendums had been held on the island to decide on its political status, the most recent in 2012. Puerto Rico has been an unincorporated territory of the United States since the conclusion of the Spanish–American War in 1898, and its residents were granted U.S. citizenship in 1917. In 1952 it became a commonwealth. Further referendums were held on the same topic in 2020 and 2024.

== Background ==
The United States invaded Puerto Rico in 1898, forcing Spain to cede Puerto Rico to the United States as part of the Treaty of Paris after the end of the Spanish–American War. Since then, the island has been an unincorporated territory of the United States. Because of this territorial status, the island is neither a state of the United States nor a sovereign one. Although Puerto Ricans were granted United States citizenship with the 1917 Jones–Shafroth Act, the American citizens residing on the island cannot vote for the president of the United States (their head of government) nor for a legislator in Congress with voting powers even though the federal government of the United States has jurisdiction on the island. In addition, due to its political status, the United States has full authority over Puerto Rico's foreign policy.

Legislation approving the referendum was passed in the Senate of Puerto Rico on January 26, 2017, by a senate controlled by the New Progressive Party of Puerto Rico (PNP In Spanish) which advocates for Puerto Rico to become a state of the United States. The measure was then passed with amendments by the House of Representatives of Puerto Rico on January 31 by a house which is also controlled by the PNP. The amendments then passed in the Senate and the bill was signed into law by Governor Ricardo Rosselló (PNP) on February 3, 2017.

While initially the referendum would only have the options of statehood and independence/free association, a letter from the Trump administration recommended to add the Commonwealth, the current status, in the plebiscite. The option had been removed from this plebiscite in response to the results of the plebiscite in 2012 which asked whether to remain in the current status and No had won. However, the Trump administration cited changes in demographics during the past 5 years to add the option once again. Amendments to the plebiscite bill were adopted making ballot wording changes requested by the U.S. Department of Justice, as well as adding a "current territorial status" option. After adding the "current status" option, the Puerto Rican government started the voting process before the Justice Department could review the revised ballot, losing $2.5 million in funding set aside and spending $8 million of its own money for the election.

Previous plebiscites have discussed the margins of the win to result in a mandate with some arguing for a 50%+1 or sometimes a higher percentage to initiate congressional action on the will of Puerto Rico. Previous plebiscites with the three options have resulted in a close race between statehood and commonwealth but with neither option breaking 50%. Congressional hearings on Puerto Rico have discussed scenarios where a second round could be held on the options that win the first but that has not been discussed by the government of Puerto Rico.

=== Previous referendums ===
Previous referendums were held in 1967, 1993, 1998, and 2012.

In the 2012 status referendum, voters were asked two questions: (1) whether they agreed to continue with Puerto Rico's territorial status, and (2) to indicate the political status they preferred from three possibilities: statehood, independence, or a sovereign nation in free association with the United States. 53.97% voted "No" on the first question, expressing themselves against maintaining the current political status, and 46.03% voted "Yes", to maintain the current political status. Of those who answered on the second question 61.16% chose statehood, 33.34% chose free association, and 5.49% chose independence.

Because there were almost 500,000 blank ballots in the 2012 referendum, creating confusion as to the voters' true desire, Congress decided to ignore the vote. The House of Representatives provided funds for holding a fifth referendum in the future.

== Referendum question and options ==
The 2017 referendum offered three options: Statehood, Independence/Free Association, and "Current Territorial Status". If the majority of the people voted for the Independence/Free Association, a second vote would have been held to determine the preference: full independence as a nation or associated free state status with independence but with a "free and voluntary political association" between Puerto Rico and the United States.

The White House Task Force on Puerto Rico offers the following specifics:

Free Association is a type of independence. A compact of Free Association would establish a mutual agreement that would recognize that the United States and Puerto Rico are closely linked in specific ways as detailed in the compact. Compacts of this sort are based on the national sovereignty of each country, and either nation can unilaterally terminate the association.

The Compact of Free Association would have covered topics such as the role of the U.S. military in Puerto Rico, the use of the U.S. currency, free trade between the two entities, and whether Puerto Ricans would be U.S. citizens.

Governor Ricardo Rosselló was strongly in favor of statehood to help develop the economy and help to "solve our 500-year-old colonial dilemma ... Colonialism is not an option .... It's a civil rights issue ... 3.5 million citizens seeking an absolute democracy," he told the news media. Benefits of statehood include an additional $10 billion per year in federal funds, the right to vote in presidential elections, higher Social Security and Medicare benefits, and a right for its government agencies and municipalities to file for bankruptcy. The latter is currently prohibited.

At approximately the same time as the referendum, Puerto Rico's legislators were expected to vote on a bill that would allow the Governor to draft a state constitution and hold elections to choose senators and representatives to the federal Congress. Regardless of the outcome of the referendum, action by the United States Congress would be necessary to implement changes to the status of Puerto Rico under the Territorial Clause of the United States Constitution.

== Boycott ==
The referendum was boycotted by one of the major parties against statehood for several reasons. One reason is that the title of the ballot asserted that Puerto Rico is a colony. (Note: The title of the ballot was "PLEBISCITE FOR THE IMMEDIATE DECOLONIZATION OF PUERTO RICO.") The Popular Democratic Party (PPD) has historically rejected that notion. Similarly, under the option for maintaining the status quo, the ballot also asserted that Puerto Rico is subject to the plenary powers of the United States Congress, a notion also historically rejected by the PPD. (Note: The blurb used below the third option asserted that, "With my vote, I express my wish that Puerto Rico remains, as it is today, subject to the powers of the Congress and subject to the Territory Clause of the United States Constitution that in the Article IV, Section 3 states: "The Congress shall have Power to dispose of and make all needful Rules and Regulations respecting the Territory or other Property belonging to the United States; and nothing in this Constitution shall be so construed as to Prejudice any Claims of the United States, or of any particular State".") Likewise, under the 'independence/free association' option, the ballot asserted that Puerto Rico must be a sovereign nation in order to enter into a compact of free association with the United States. (Note: The blurb used under the second option asserted that, "The Free Association would be based on a free and voluntary political association, the specific terms of which shall be agreed upon between the United States and Puerto Rico as sovereign nations.") Supporters of the free association movement reject this notion. Had these parties participated in the referendum, they claim it would mean they had accepted those assertions implicitly, regardless of whether the assertions were correct.

== Opinion polls ==
Date	Pollster	Statehood	Current status	Free Association / Independence	Abstain	Undecided	Margin of Error	Sample size
May 24–26, 2017	El Nuevo Día	52%	17%	15%	9%	7%	±3.2%	966

== Results ==
Choice	Votes	%
Statehood	508,862	97.13
Free association / independence	7,981	1.52
Current status	7,048	1.35
Total	523,891	100.00
Valid votes	523,891	99.76
Invalid/blank votes	1,247	0.24
Total votes	525,138	100.00
Registered voters/turnout	2,260,804	23.23
Source: CEEPUR

== See also ==
- Sovereigntism (Puerto Rico)
- Independence movement in Puerto Rico
- Statehood movement in Puerto Rico
- Puerto Rico Democracy Act of 2007 (H.R. 900 & S. 1936)
- Puerto Rican citizenship
- Territories of the United States
- Proposed political status for Puerto Rico
- Voting rights in Puerto Rico
- Politics of Puerto Rico
- Political status of Puerto Rico
- Special Committee on Decolonization
- United Nations list of non-self-governing territories
- District of Columbia statehood referendum, 2016
