= 2012 Puerto Rican status referendum =

- 6 November 2012

Do you agree that Puerto Rico should continue to have its present form of territorial status?
Yes	46.03%
No	53.97%

Regardless of your selection in the first question, please mark which of the following non-territorial options you would prefer.
Statehood	61.16%
Free Association	33.34%
Independence	5.49%

A referendum on the political status of Puerto Rico was held in Puerto Rico on November 6, 2012. It was the fourth referendum on status to be held in Puerto Rico. Puerto Rico has been an unincorporated territory of the United States since the Spanish–American War in 1898.

Puerto Rican voters were asked two questions: firstly whether they agreed to continue with Puerto Rico's territorial status and secondly to indicate the political status they preferred from three possibilities: statehood, independence, or a sovereign nation in free association with the United States. 970,910 (53.97%) voted "No" on the first question, expressing themselves against maintaining the current political status, and 828,077 (46.03%) voted "Yes", to maintain the current political status. Of those who answered on the second question 834,191 (61.16%) chose statehood, 454,768 (33.34%) chose free association, and 74,895 (5.49%) chose independence.

The governor-elect Alejandro García Padilla of the Popular Democratic Party (PPD) and several other leaders who favor the present status had recommended voting "Yes" to the first question, and leaving the second question blank as a protest to what they said was "an anti-democratic process" and "a trap".

Puerto Rico's nonvoting Resident Commissioner, Pedro Pierluisi, has said that he will "defend the people's decision" in Washington, D.C. He plans to introduce legislation in Congress to admit Puerto Rico to the Union. Although García Padilla questioned the validity of the results, he stated that he planned to go forward with what President Barack Obama had suggested, and convene a constituent assembly to resolve the status issue. Such an assembly was not ultimately held under García Padilla's governorship.

Previous referendums had been held on the island to decide on the political status of Puerto Rico, most recently in 1998.

== Background ==
Puerto Rico has been an unincorporated territory of the United States since the end of the Spanish–American War in 1898. Although Puerto Ricans were granted United States citizenship with the 1917 Jones–Shafroth Act, they cannot vote for the President of the United States unless registered to vote in one of the United States. In addition, the US retains the exclusive right to create and manage foreign policy, including any that affects the island.

In June 2011 the United Nations Special Committee on Decolonization asked the United States to expedite the process for political status self-determination in Puerto Rico. Puerto Rico, unlike several other U.S. territories such as Guam, American Samoa, and the U.S. Virgin Islands, is not on the United Nations list of non-self-governing territories. As it is not a state, its citizens do not have the right to full representation in the U.S. Congress nor can they vote in presidential elections. On December 28, 2011, Governor Luis Fortuño authorized the referendum for November 6, 2012.

=== Support ===
Most of the leadership of the New Progressive Party (PNP) vouched for a status referendum to be held. Governor Fortuño, Resident Commissioner Pedro Pierluisi, and Jorge Santini, the Mayor of San Juan, all supported holding a status referendum. Originally, they presented a bill which divided the process into two separate referendums: one in August to vote whether or not to continue with the current status, and a second one in November to choose among several alternatives to the current status. This process was approved in a General Assembly of the party in October 2011.

Jenniffer González, the Speaker of the House of Representatives, also supported the bill. In December 2011, the House approved the bill for a status referendum to be held in November 2012, along with the general elections. The day before the elections, González said the opportunity to vote for statehood was "historic".

Juan Dalmau Ramírez, gubernatorial candidate for the Puerto Rico Independence Party (PIP), defended the participation of supporters of Puerto Rican independence in the status referendum. Dalmau said that Puerto Rico "had a problem, which was the cancer of colonialism which doesn't allow us to develop ourselves." He said that Puerto Ricans should take advantage of "every chance to overcome the colonial status" and criticized Alejandro García Padilla, President of the Popular Democratic Party (PPD) for not supporting the process.

=== Opposition ===
The status referendum has been criticized by some members of all political parties, including the New Progressive Party (PNP) that proposed it. Former Governor of Puerto Rico Pedro Rosselló (from the PNP) said that the choices in the ballot were confusing and might cause "an uncertainty that, in the end, will bring us more of the same: the status quo, continued." Another former governor from the PNP, Carlos Romero Barceló, argued that "the content and language of the formulas will confuse the voter."

Former Governor of Puerto Rico Rafael Hernández Colón, from the PPD, argued that the project "doesn't follow the recommendations of the White House report on [Puerto Rico] in either its content or its date." He criticized the definition used for the Estado Libre Asociado, which is the current status and the one his party defends. According to El Nuevo Día (December 13, 2011), Hernández Colón would advocate that they follow the seventh recommendation of the White House report, and "work from the island to go, together with the White House, to Congress with a bill, in order to press them to establish real status options for the citizens to vote [on]." Another member of the PPD, Senator Eduardo Bhatia, said that the status referendum was "a trick" and that the results would not have any value in Washington because it was an "illegitimate and badly designed ballot question."

Some members of the minority parties agreed with the criticism. After a poll in a local newspaper presented contradicting results, Rogelio Figueroa, gubernatorial candidate and co-founder of the Puerto Ricans for Puerto Rico Party (PPR), argued that the poll was proof the status referendum would not solve the status issue. He also said that the project was just a way for the two main parties to "perpetuate themselves". Other leaders from the Movimiento Unión Soberanista (MUS), Worker's People Party (PPT), and the Movimiento Independentista Nacional Hostosiano (MINH) considered the process to be just an excuse of the government to "push supporters of statehood to vote" with some of them calling the referendum a "deceit to voters."

=== Report by the President's Task Force on Puerto Rico's Status ===
The Report by the President's Task Force on Puerto Rico's Status recognizes that the authority under the U.S. Constitution to establish a permanent non-territorial status for the Commonwealth of Puerto Rico rests with Congress. Although the current territorial status may continue so long as Congress desires, only two non-territorial options are recognized by the U.S. Constitution to establish a permanent status between the people of Puerto Rico and the Government of the United States.

- One is statehood. Under this option, Puerto Rico would become the 51st State with standing equal to the other 50 States.
- The other is independence. Under this option, Puerto Rico would become a separate, independent sovereign nation.

The report said that the democratic will of the Puerto Rican people was paramount for the future status of the territory. It suggested any change should begin with an expression from the people of Puerto Rico on whether to maintain current territorial status or establish a permanent non-territorial status with regard to the United States. It recommended that the will of people be ascertained in a way to provide clear guidance for future action by Congress.

The December 2005 Task Force made the following recommendations:

1. Congress within a year to provide for a federally sanctioned plebiscite in which the people of Puerto Rico will be asked to state whether they wish to remain a U.S. territory subject to the will of Congress or to pursue a Constitutionally viable path toward a permanent non-territorial status with the United States. Congress should provide for this plebiscite to occur on a date certain.
2. If the people of Puerto Rico elect to pursue a permanent non-territorial status, Congress should provide for an additional plebiscite allowing the people of Puerto Rico to choose between one of the two permanent non-territorial options. Once the people have selected one of the two options, Congress is encouraged to begin a process of transition toward that option.
3. If the people elect to remain as a territory, a plebiscite should be held periodically, as long as that status continues, to keep the US Congress informed of the people's wishes.

President George H. W. Bush issued a memorandum on November 30, 1992, to heads of executive departments and agencies, establishing the current administrative relationship between the federal government and the Commonwealth of Puerto Rico. This memorandum directs all federal departments, agencies, and officials to treat Puerto Rico administratively as if it were a state insofar as doing so would not disrupt federal programs or operations.

The December 2007 Report by the President's Task Force on Puerto Rico's Status reiterated its prior 2005 recommendation that Congress provide for a federally sanctioned plebiscite in order that the people of Puerto Rico could express their wishes in relation to maintaining the current territorial status or to pursuing a constitutionally viable path toward a permanent non-territorial status. Congress should provide for this plebiscite to occur on a date certain.

On March 16, 2011, the President's Task Force on Political Status issued a third report which concluded that "(u)nder the Commonwealth option, Puerto Rico would remain, as it is today, subject to the Territory Clause of the U.S. Constitution." It said that proposals for enhanced Commonwealth were unconstitutional in relation to the U.S. Constitution. Such proposals had provisions that would not be enforceable because a future Congress "could choose to alter that relationship unilaterally."

The Plebiscite was called by the elective representatives of the people of Puerto Rico on the options for the Island Status identified by the Task Force on Puerto Rico. The structure of the Plebiscite followed the findings and recommendations proposed by the March 2011 Task Force report.

== Ballot ==
The referendum posed two questions. Voters were asked first whether they agreed that Puerto Rico should continue to have its present form of territorial status. Regardless of how voters answered that question, they were asked secondly, to express their preference among the three non-territorial alternatives:

- statehood,
- complete independence, or
- nationhood in free association with the United States. Marshall Islands, Micronesia and Palau have such an agreement through the Compact of Free Association.

The ballot descriptions for the second part of the question were:

- Statehood: "Puerto Rico should be admitted as a state of the United States of America so that all United States citizens residing in Puerto Rico may have rights, benefits, and responsibilities equal to those enjoyed by all other citizens of the states of the Union, and be entitled to full representation in Congress and to participate in the Presidential elections, and the United States Congress would be required to pass any necessary legislation to begin the transition into Statehood." This option was identified by a star with the number 51 inside.
- Independence: "Puerto Rico should become a sovereign nation, fully independent from the United States and the United States Congress would be required to pass any necessary legislation to begin the transition into independent nation of Puerto Rico." This option was identified by a map of Puerto Rico with the word "Free" written inside.
- Sovereign Free Associated State: "Puerto Rico should adopt a status outside of the Territory Clause of the Constitution of the United States that recognizes the sovereignty of the People of Puerto Rico. The Sovereign Free Associated State would be based on a free and voluntary political association, the specific terms of which shall be agreed upon between the United States and Puerto Rico as sovereign nations. Such agreement would provide the scope of the jurisdictional powers that the People of Puerto Rico agree to confer to the United States and retain all other jurisdictional powers and authorities." This option was identified by the silhouette of a pitirre (Gray Kingbird).

=== Criticism ===
Critics said that voters who favor a developed version of the current status of Puerto Rico (a commonwealth which is part of the United States with internal self-government) had no alternatives on the ballot. As a result, leaders of the Popular Democratic Party (PPD) instructed such voters to leave the second portion of the ballot blank, or to invalidate the ballot.

Because there were almost 500,000 blank ballots, creating confusion as to the voters' true desire, it provided Congress an opportunity to ignore the vote, which it did.

History professor Luis Agrait explained the result in this manner to CNN: "If you assume those blank votes are anti-statehood votes, the true result for the statehood option would be less than 50%." Considered as a percentage of the total number of votes cast in the first ballot, 44% voted in favor of statehood on the second ballot.

== Results ==
In this election, 2,402,941 voters were registered to vote; of these, 1,864,186 voted, giving the plebiscite a 78% stake. In the second part of the ballot, 498,604 voters left ballots blank, and another 16,744 ballots were rejected, with votes not awarded. This was the tally of the final vote:

=== Part I ===
Should Puerto Rico continue its current territorial status?
Choice	Votes	%
For	828,077	46.03
Against	970,910	53.97
Total	1,798,987	100.00
Valid votes	1,798,987	95.73
Invalid/blank votes	80,215	4.27
Total votes	1,879,202	100.00
Registered voters/turnout	2,402,941	78.20
Source: CEEPUR

=== Part II ===
Which non-territorial option do you prefer?
Choice	Votes	%
Statehood	834,191	61.16
Free Association	454,768	33.34
Independence	74,895	5.49
Total	1,363,854	100.00
Valid votes	1,363,854	72.58
Invalid/blank votes	515,348	27.42
Total votes	1,879,202	100.00
Registered voters/turnout	2,402,941	78.20
Source: CEEPUR

== Reactions and aftermath ==
Puerto Rico's Resident Commissioner Pedro Pierluisi and outgoing Governor Luis Fortuño have stated that they will present the results to the Obama administration and leaders of the United States Congress. President Obama had said that he would support the will of Puerto Ricans if there is a clear majority.

Governor-elect Alejandro García Padilla, who had been critical of the process, said that the consult was "unfair" and that it didn't offer clear results. He also said that "none of the options received most of the 50% within the emitted ballots," which included those from voters who did not choose any of the presented non-territorial options. Wilda Rodriguez, a freelance journalist and political analyst, said that the votes for the various "anti-statehood" alternatives cancelled each other out. She conducted a poll and found that 53.64% of the electorate do not support statehood. The analyst Néstor Duprey said that, although the premise that statehood won could be mathematically correct, the "blank ballots can't be ignored because they are the product of a political intention" —referring to the PPD's campaign for voters to leave the second question unanswered.

On November 8, 2012, the Washington, D.C. newspaper, The Hill, suggested that Congress will likely ignore the results of the referendum due to the circumstances behind the votes. U.S. Congressman Luis Gutiérrez and U.S. Congresswoman Nydia Velázquez, both of Puerto Rican ancestry, agreed with the statements.

A few days after the referendum, Governor-elect Alejandro García Padilla wrote a letter to President Obama, asking him to reject the results because of their ambiguity. On November 13, 2012, both the Resident Commissioner Pedro Pierluisi and the current Governor Luis Fortuño wrote separate letters to President Obama urging him to begin legislation in favor of resolving the political status of Puerto Rico, in light of the results of the referendum.

In early December, ad-lib comments by the White House spokesman were initially ambiguous. Hours later, Luis Miranda, the White House's Hispanic Affairs spokesman, told Puerto Rico's El Nuevo Día that the Obama administration thought a majority of Puerto Ricans voted for statehood and supported Congress taking action.

On December 11, 2012, the Legislative Assembly of Puerto Rico enacted a concurrent resolution to "request the President and the Congress of the United States, to respond diligently and effectively, and to act on the demand of the people of Puerto Rico, as freely and democratically expressed in the plebiscite held on November 6, 2012, to end, once and for all, its current form of territorial status and to begin the process of admission of Puerto Rico as a State."

The PNP organized pro-statehood marches which were held on March 2, 2013, in both Puerto Rico and on the mainland demanding that the U.S. government honor the results of the referendum. Hundreds of people participated in the pro-statehood marches which took place in San Juan, Orlando, and Washington DC on the 96th anniversary of the Jones Act, the 1917 law which gave Puerto Ricans U.S. citizenship.

On April 10, 2013, it was announced that the White House would seek $2.5 million to hold another referendum as part of Obama's 2014 budget proposal (the money would fund both voter education and the plebiscite itself). This next referendum would be the first Puerto Rican status referendum to be financed by the federal government. Leaders of the PNP (party in favor of statehood) claimed that the announcement meant that the White House upheld the results of the 2012 referendum, while the PDP (party in favor of maintaining the status quo) claimed that the announcement meant the White House rejected the 2012 referendum.

On May 15, 2013, non-voting Resident Commissioner Pedro Pierluisi introduced the Puerto Rico Status Resolution Act (H.R. 2000) to the House of Representatives, which if passed would ask Puerto Rican voters if they want Puerto Rico to be admitted as a state of the United States. If the Puerto Rican people support statehood, the bill would direct the president to introduce legislation within 180 days to admit Puerto Rico as a state of the union. Pierluisi said that his bill is "distinct" but "consistent" with the White House's proposal for a Puerto Rican vote.

On June 17, 2013, Pierluisi said during a testimony before the U.N. Special Committee on Decolonization that if the Obama administration refuses to act he will raise his case for Puerto Rican self-determination before the United Nations or any other appropriate international forum. Pierluisi said that the current territorial status has lost its democratic legitimacy and that the only paths forward are statehood or nationhood.

On July 10, 2013, A U.S. House subcommittee approved a budget bill which includes Obama's requested $2.5 million for a new Puerto Rican plebiscite, though the bill's ultimate fate is unclear because the Senate is pushing for a related yet different bill. One week later, on July 17, 2013, the House Appropriations Committee also approved the bill.

It was reported on July 10, 2013, that Pierluisi had secured the support of at least 87 members of Congress across partisan lines for the Puerto Rico Status Resolution Act. It was reported on July 24, 2013, that this number has increased to an even 100 congressional supporters. On August 6, 2013, reports put bill sponsorship at 120 members, giving it more supporters than 97.6% of all House bills and the fourth highest in Republican sponsorship.

On August 1, 2013, the Senate Energy and Natural Resources Committee held a hearing on Puerto Rico's status as a direct result of the 2012 plebiscite vote and invited Governor Alejandro García Padilla, Resident Commissioner Pedro Pierluisi, and pro-independence supporter Rubén Berríos to give testimony and answer questions from the committee.

The 2014 budget bill included $2.5 million in funding for a future vote in Puerto Rico's political status. This referendum could be held at any time, as there was no deadline attached to the funds.

The Puerto Rican status referendum, 2017 was held on June 11, 2017, with 97% voting for statehood but amid historically low turnout. There was another one in 2020 (Puerto Rican status referendum, 2020) and again in 2024 (see Puerto Rican status referendum, 2024). Although each had different choices, in both cases the top choice was Statehood. Additionally, a Pro-Statehood candidate won the Governor race in 2024.

== See also ==
- District of Columbia statehood movement
- 51st state
- Sovereigntism (Puerto Rico)
- Political status of Puerto Rico
- Puerto Rico (proposed state)
- Special Committee on Decolonization
- Proposed political status for Puerto Rico
- Statehood movement in Puerto Rico
