= Presidential executive orders on the political status of Puerto Rico =

Various United States presidents have signed executive orders to help define, study, and generate activity regarding the political status of Puerto Rico. Three major orders were the 2005, 2007, and 2011 executive orders to establish the Presidential Task Force on the Status of Puerto Rico.

== 2005 Presidential Task Force Report ==
In December 2005, a Report by the President's Task Force on Puerto Rico's Status asserted that the Constitution of the United States does not allow for a mechanism "to bind future Congresses to any particular arrangement for Puerto Rico as a Commonwealth" without an amendment to the Constitution of the United States. The report also stated that Puerto Rico's current status "does not meet the criteria for any of the options for full self government." The Report made its determinations based on articles in the U.S. Constitution regarding territories.

Prominent leaders in Puerto Rico's pro-independence political movements agreed with this assessment. Leaders in the pro-statehood political movements also agreed with the assessment. The Legislative Branch, then controlled by the pro-statehood New Progressive Party (PNP), supported the White House report's conclusions and has supported bills introduced by Congressmen José Serrano (D-NY) and Luis Fortuño (R-PR) and Senators Ken Salazar (D-CO) and Mel Martinez (R-FL) to provide for a democratic referendum process among Puerto Rico voters.

The Popular Democratic Party (PPD), on the other hand, announced a commitment to challenge the Task Force report and validate the current status in all international forums including the United Nations. It also rejected any "colonial or territorial status" as a status option, and vowed to keep working for the enhanced Commonwealth status that was approved by the PPD in 1998, which included sovereignty, an association based on "respect and dignity between both nations", and common citizenship. The task force recommendations were rejected by the former governor of Puerto Rico Aníbal Acevedo Vilá on a letter on January 24, 2006, who condemned the report and rejected "any efforts to turn the task force's recommendations into Congressional legislation." The former governor, among others, argued that the "Commonwealth" or, in some cases, "Enhanced Commonwealth" constructs are legitimate non-territorial options under U. S. constitutional and statutory law."

In a letter sent by then-governor Acevedo-Vilá to the former U.S. Secretary of State, Condoleezza Rice and the Bush Administration Co-Chairs of the President's Task Force on Puerto Rico's Status, the former governor stated that "if the Task Force and the Bush Administration stand by their 2005 conclusions, then for over 50 years the U.S Government has perpetuated a 'monumental hoax' on the people of Puerto Rico, on the people of the United States and on the international community. If the 2005 report articulates the new official position of the United States, the time has come now for the State Department to formally notify the United Nations of this new position and assume the international legal consequences. You cannot have a legal and constitutional interpretation for local, political purposes and a different one for the international community." On January 4, 2006, then-governor Vilá and the Popular Democratic Party challenged the task force report with a resolution that denounced the task force as a political fraud and threat to democracy, and called the report's conclusion a violation of the basic agreements held between the people of Puerto Rico and the United States since 1952.

A bill supporting the PPD's position was introduced in the United States Senate on February 16, 2006, by two senators who have traditionally been identified with Puerto Rico, Senators Edward M. Kennedy (D-MA) and Bob Menendez (D-NJ) and two senators whose interest in matters related to Puerto Rico was up to then unknown, Senators Richard Mauze Burr (R-NC) and Chester Trent Lott. Since its introduction, however, the bill did not attract any other co-sponsors. A bipartisan Senate bill supporting the implementation of the White House report recommendations was filed by Senators Mel Martinez (R-FL) and Ken Salazar (D-CO) and co-sponsored by 14 other Democratic and Republican senators, including Daniel Akaka [D-HI], Evan Bayh [D-IN], Samuel Brownback [R-KS], Thomas Carper [D-DE], Norm Coleman [R-MN], Larry Craig [R-ID], Charles Hagel [R-NE], Daniel Inouye [D-HI], John Kerry [D-MA], Mary Landrieu [D-LA], John McCain [R-AZ], Ben Nelson [D-NE], Bill Nelson [D-FL] and Ted Stevens [R-AK].

- Report By the President's Task Force On Puerto Rico's Status (December 2005) - President George W. Bush.

== 2007 Presidential Task Force Report ==
On December 21, 2007, the President's Task Force on Puerto Rico's Political Status issued a second Report. This 2007 Report stated that the United States, in its written submission to the UN in 1953, never represented that the U.S. Congress could not change its relationship with Puerto Rico without the territory's consent. It stated that the U.S. Justice Department in 1959 reiterated that Congress held power over Puerto Rico pursuant to the Territorial Clause of the U.S. Constitution. In a 1996 report on a Puerto Rico status political bill, the "U.S. House Committee on Resources stated that Puerto Rico's current status does not meet the criteria for any of the options for full self-government". It concluded that Puerto Rico is still an unincorporated territory of the U.S. under the territorial clause, that the establishment of local self-government with the consent of the people can be unilaterally revoked by the U.S. Congress, and that U.S. Congress can also withdraw the U.S. citizenship of Puerto Rico residents of Puerto Rico at any time, for a legitimate Federal purpose. The application of the American Constitution to Puerto Rico is limited by the Insular Cases. In essence, the December 2007 report reiterated and confirmed the U.S. position that had been expressed in the report of 2005: that Puerto Rico continued to be a territory of the U.S. under the plenary powers of the U.S. Congress. This position continues to be shared by the other two major political parties in Puerto Rico: New Progressive Party and the Puerto Rican Independence Party.

- Report By the President's Task Force On Puerto Rico's Status (December 2007) - President George W. Bush.

== 2011 Presidential Task Force Report ==
On March 16, 2011, the President's Task Force on Political Status issued a third report which once again concludes that "(u)nder the Commonwealth option, Puerto Rico would remain, as it is today, subject to the Territory Clause of the U.S. Constitution (p. 26) and that "consistent with the legal conclusions reached by prior Task Force reports, one aspect of some proposals for enhanced Commonwealth remains constitutionally problematic—proposals that would establish a relationship between Puerto Rico and the Federal Government that could not be altered except by mutual consent...such provisions would not be enforceable because a future Congress could choose to alter that relationship unilaterally." (p. 26).

The Task Force also stated that "the long-term economic well-being of Puerto Rico would be dramatically improved by an early decision on the status question." (p. 33), before embarking on economic analysis and recommendations that constitute over two-thirds of the report.

- Report By the President's Task Force On Puerto Rico's Status (March 2011) - President Barack Obama.

== 2025 Proposed presidential executive order ==
In March 2025, a group of Puerto Rican lawyers, economists and activists sent a document to the White House and Congress in the United States, of a possible executive order by President Donald Trump, proposing to grant independence to Puerto Rico by presidential decree.
