= Status quo movement in Puerto Rico =

Movement for Puerto Rico to remain a commonwealth of the U.S.

The status quo movement in Puerto Rico refers to initiatives throughout the history of Puerto Rico aimed at maintaining the current political status of Puerto Rico, that of a commonwealth of the United States.

Puerto Rico is currently an unincorporated territory of the United States. As a Commonwealth, Puerto Rico receives less in federal funding than the states. Residents are US citizens and can vote in territorial and local elections, but do not have the right to vote in presidential or Congressional elections. They receive lower Social Security and Medicare benefits, but do not generally have to pay federal income tax. The Commonwealth and municipal governments of Puerto Rico are prohibited from filing for bankruptcy.

In the 2012 Puerto Rican status referendum, 54% of the ballots cast were against the continuation of the island's status as a territory of the US. Of the votes for new status, a 61.1% majority chose statehood. This was by far the most successful referendum for statehood advocates. In all earlier referendums, votes for statehood were matched almost equally by votes for remaining an American territory, with the remainder for independence. Support for U.S. statehood has risen in each successive popular referendum.

On December 11, 2012, the Legislative Assembly of Puerto Rico enacted a concurrent resolution to request the President and the Congress of the United States, to respond diligently and effectively, and to act on the demand of the people of Puerto Rico, as freely and democratically expressed in the plebiscite held on November 6, to end, once and for all, its current form of territorial status and to begin the process of admission of Puerto Rico as a State. The government did not take steps to meet this request, but provided funding for a fifth referendum.

The 2017 Puerto Rican status referendum held on June 11 of that year, offered three options: "Statehood", "Current Territorial Status" and "Independence/Free Association." The result was over 97% of votes cast favored statehood. However, the legitimacy of the referendum was called into question as all major parties that oppose statehood boycotted the referendum due to the phrasing of the ballot. Voter turnout was only 23%.

The subsequent 2020 Puerto Rican status referendum was held on November 3 also to decide whether Puerto Rico should become a state. Out of more than half the number of registered voters in 2020, 52% voted for statehood and 47% chose the status quo. However, action by the United States Congress is necessary to grant statehood to Puerto Rico under the Admissions Clause of the United States Constitution.

== See also ==
- 51st state
- Puerto Rico (proposed state)
- Special Committee on Decolonization
- Proposed political status for Puerto Rico
