= President's Task Force on Puerto Rico's Status =

To provide options for PR's future political status and relationship with the US

The President’s Task Force on Puerto Rico’s Status was a body of advisors created in 2000 to provide options for Puerto Rico’s future political status and relationship with the United States. The Task Force listened to and considered the views of individuals, elected officials, and other representatives of the people of Puerto Rico in an effort to ensure that views and positions were objectively considered regardless of affiliation or ideology.

It published its first report in December 2005, and then a second report in 2007. The 2007 Report built on the 2005 Report and carried out "the Task Force’s ongoing mandate to report, no less than every two years, on progress made in the determination of Puerto Rico’s ultimate status". The latest report by the Task Force on Puerto Rico’s Status, whose members were appointed by President Barack Obama, was issued on March 16, 2011. The entity seems not to have reconvened since then.

== Background ==
On November 30, 1992, President George H. W. Bush issued a memorandum to heads of executive departments and agencies establishing the current administrative relationship between the Federal Government and the Commonwealth of Puerto Rico. This memorandum directs all Federal departments, agencies, and officials to treat Puerto Rico administratively as if it were a State insofar as doing so would not disrupt Federal programs or operations. President Bush’s memorandum remains in effect until Federal legislation is enacted to alter the status of Puerto Rico in accordance with the freely expressed wishes of the people of Puerto Rico.

== Executive Orders concerning Puerto Rico’s status ==
In 2000, as a result of an initiative by Puerto Rico Senator Rubén Berríos at the White House, President Bill Clinton created a Task Force on Puerto Rico's Status and its options.

On December 23, 2000, Clinton issued Executive Order 13183, which established the President’s Task Force on Puerto Rico’s Status and the rules for its membership. This Executive Order outlines the policy and functions of the Task Force in identifying the options for Puerto Rico’s future status and the process for realizing an option. It also gave the mandate to clarify both the status options available to Puerto Rico and the process by which those options can be realized. In other words, the Task Force was charged with identifying for the people of Puerto Rico and Congress those status options that are compatible with the U.S. Constitution, without favoring any one of those options.

On April 30, 2001, President George W. Bush amended Executive Order 13183 with Executive Order 13209, extending the deadline for the Task Force to forward a report to the President until August 2001. President Bush issued an additional amendment to Executive Order 13183 on December 3, 2003, with Executive Order 13319, which established the Task Force co-chairs and instructed the Task Force to issue reports as needed, but no less than once every two years. Executive Order 13517 of October 30, 2009, made further amendments expanding the functions and required reporting of the Task Force.

The 2005 Task Force Report explained that the U.S. Constitution allows for three options for the future status of Puerto Rico: continuing territorial status, statehood, and independence. In so doing, the Task Force did not break new ground. The Department of Justice affirmed the Commonwealth’s territorial status in 1959, shortly after the enactment of Public Law 600, and the Supreme Court has held the same. (See, e.g., Harris v. Rosario, 446 U.S. 651 (1980)). Since 1991, the Executive Branch, through the Department of Justice, has further emphasized that the Constitution contemplates only three options for Puerto Rico’s future status.

== Task Force recommendations ==
During George W. Bush’s administration, the Task Force issued two reports, the one that had been commissioned by President Bill Clinton on December 23, 2000, via Executive Order 13183 and extended by President George W. Bush on April 30, 2001 via an Executive Order by the same 13183 number, and dated December 2005, and a second new one commissioned by President George W. Bush himself on December 3, 2003, as an amendment to Executive Order 13183, and dated December 2007. Both reports recognized that Puerto Rico does not have a status of a permanent nature, and despite being granted wide autonomy over local issues, that it continues to be a territory of the United States subject to Congress’s plenary powers. The reports also affirmed that the alternative status options are sovereignty, whether as an independent nation or in free association with the United States, and statehood. The reports explained in detail the constitutional limitations that confront any status proposal that is not sovereignty or statehood.

These reports included language that generated controversy in Puerto Rico. For example, the report said that the powers conferred upon Congress under the Territorial Clause of the U.S. Constitution are so expansive that the federal government could cede Puerto Rico to another nation.

As detailed earlier and in the 2005 Report, the Task Force concludes that there are only three options available under the U.S. Constitution for the future status of Puerto Rico:

- Continue as a territory. The current status of Puerto Rico as a commonwealth may continue indefinitely but remains subject to future modification by Congress.
- Statehood. Under this option, Puerto Rico would become the 51st state with standing equal to the other 50 States.
- Independence. Under this option, Puerto Rico would become a sovereign nation, independent from the United States.

The democratic will of the Puerto Rican people is paramount for determining the future status of the territory. To this end, the 2005 Task Force Report recommended a two-stage referendum to determine whether the Puerto Rican people wish to retain the status quo, and if not, which of the two available options they prefer. The Task Force concluded that such a process would be the best way to ascertain the popular will in a way that provides clear guidance for future action by Congress.

The Task Force acknowledges the pending legislative measures that would provide similar or alternative procedures through which the people of Puerto Rico might express their will regarding the future status of the Island. The Task Force continues to believe that the two-stage referendum would provide clearer guidance for Congress than other procedures in which it is possible that none of the available options would win a majority of votes. At the same time, there are other ways to proceed, and the Task Force’s recommendations do not preclude alternative action by Puerto Rico itself to express its views to Congress.

The following are the recommendations of the Task Force:

- The Task Force reiterates its prior recommendation that Congress provide for a federally sanctioned referendum as soon as practicable in which the people of Puerto Rico will be asked to state whether they wish to maintain the current territorial status or to pursue a constitutionally viable path toward a permanent non-territorial status. Congress should provide for this referendum to occur on a certain date.
- The Task Force reiterates its prior recommendation that if the people of Puerto Rico elect to pursue a permanent non-territorial status, Congress should provide for an additional referendum to allow the people of Puerto Rico to choose between one of the permanent non-territorial options permitted by the Constitution: statehood or independence. Once the people of Puerto Rico have selected one of the two options, the Executive branch would encourage Congress to begin a process of transition consistent with that option.
- If the people elect to maintain Puerto Rico’s current status, the Task Force recommends, consistent with the 1992 memorandum of President George H. W. Bush, that a referendum occur periodically as long as that status continues, to keep Congress informed of the people of Puerto Rico.

The aforementioned recommendations were reiterated and confirmed by the 2007 President's Task Force on Puerto Rico's status report.

On March 16, 2011, the Task Force issued a third report in which Barack Obama's administration joins those of Presidents George H. W. Bush, Bill Clinton, and George W. Bush in describing Puerto Rico as remaining under the Territory Clause of the U.S. Constitution. This third report devotes the bulk of its contents to economic analysis and recommendations beyond the issue of Puerto Rico's political status.

== See also ==
- Political status of Puerto Rico
- Politics of Puerto Rico
- Voting rights in Puerto Rico
- 51st state
- Associated state
- Commonwealth (U.S. insular area)
