= United States party politics and the political status of Puerto Rico =

Political status of Puerto Rico within the U.S.

Puerto Rico is an unincorporated territory within the United States. As such, the island is neither a U.S. state or a sovereign nation. Due to the territory's ambiguous status, there are ongoing disputes regarding how Puerto Rico should be governed. Both major United States political parties, (the Democratic and the Republican parties), have expressed their support for the U.S. citizens in Puerto Rico to exercise to self-determination, with the Republican Party platform explicitly mentioning support for right to statehood and the Democratic Party platform voicing broader support for right to self-determination. Puerto Rico has been under U.S. sovereignty for over a century and Puerto Ricans have been U.S. citizens since 1917, but the island's ultimate status still has not been determined and its 3.9 million residents do not have voting representation in their national government.

The ultimate political status of Puerto Rico has been a political issue among voters for over half a century, featuring in almost every major party platform since 1940. (Note: The matter featured in every major (Democratic and Republican) party platform except for the 1964 Republican and 1984 Democratic platforms.)

== Background ==
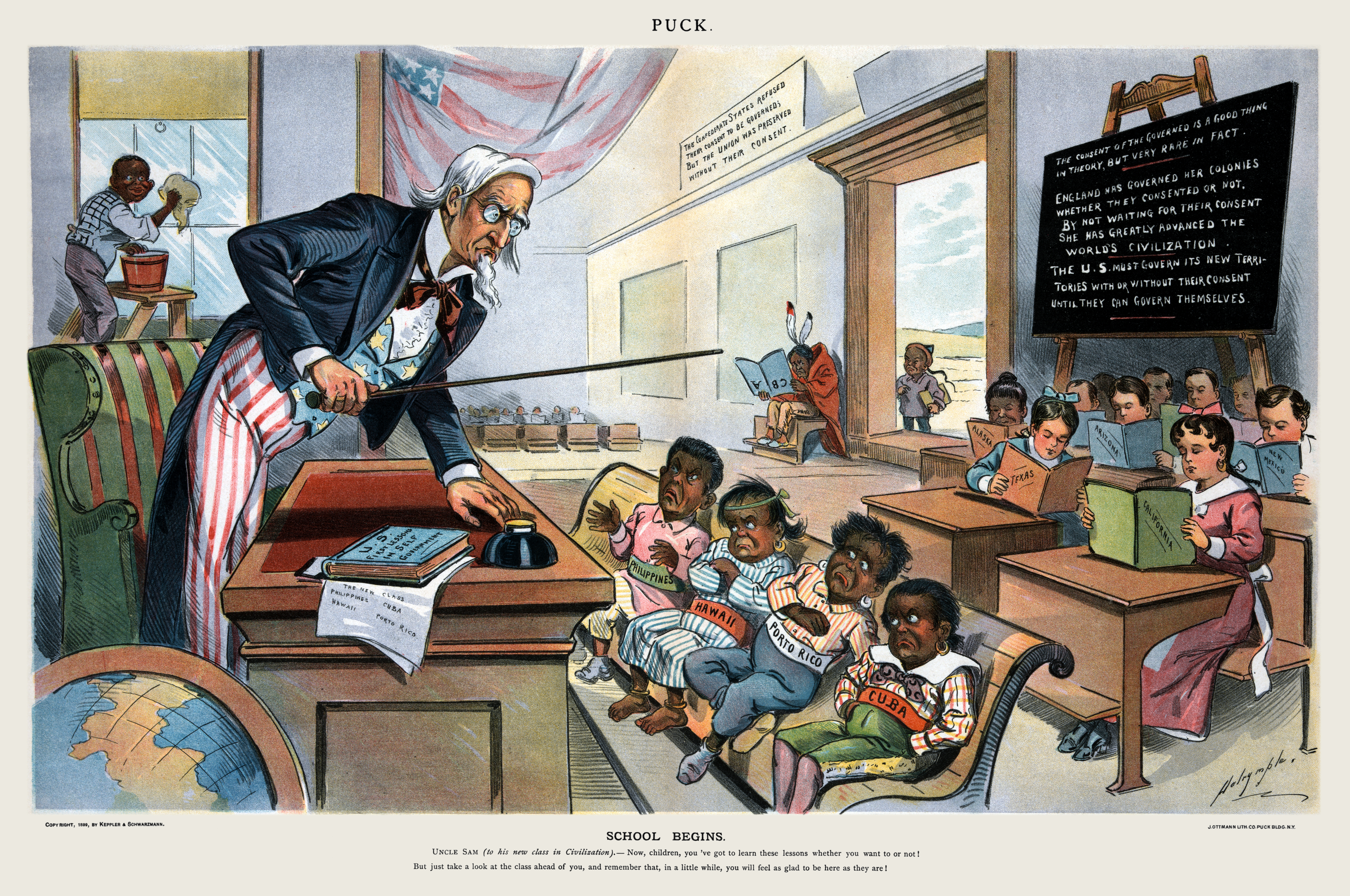
An 1899, caricature by Louis Dalrymple (1866–1905), showing Uncle Sam harshly lecturing four black children labelled Philippines, Hawaii, Puerto Rico and Cuba

The brief Spanish–American War resulted in the seizure of Cuba, the Philippines and Puerto Rico by the United States in July 1898. In October, a military governor position was established to rule over the Puerto Ricans. The inaugural holder of this position was John R. Brooke, a former Union general during the American Civil War. The position only held de facto rule over Puerto Rico until December 1898, when the Treaty of Paris was signed and subsequently ratified by the U.S. Senate in 1899, thus Puerto Rico was formally ceded to the U.S. The military administration successfully managed to police the island as well as establish a school system, adequate sanitation systems, and build and maintain highways and roads. While the military administration is generally seen as a success, it has attracted criticism for disregarding local cultural and political sensitivities.

The Foraker Act of 1900 created a civil government, however this was met with backlash from Puerto Ricans, who felt that they were not represented. The law was then amended to allow for more Puerto Ricans to hold government posts.

In 1909, the Olmsted Amendment gave the United States Congress and president more power over the Puerto Rican legislature, but was once again met with discontent from the Puerto Ricans, who demanded more local autonomy.

The passage of the Jones Act in 1917 automatically granted all Puerto Rican citizens U.S. citizenship, further integrating the island but failing to give the people of Puerto Rico self-determination. The political parties in Puerto Rico campaigned for legal reform of Puerto Rico, but were largely unsuccessful until 1946, when Jesús T. Piñero was appointed governor, the first Puerto Rican native to be so. A 1947 U.S. Congress act subsequently gave the Puerto Ricans the right to elect their own governor by popular vote.

The Puerto Rico Commonwealth Bill quickly followed suit, which paved the way for a Puerto Rican constitution, however this was met with fierce opposition from Puerto Rican nationalists, two of whom eventually tried to assassinate President Truman. A subsequent referendum in 1951 approved commonwealth status for Puerto Rico, and in 1952 a new constitution was formally adopted.

The political status of Puerto Rico within the United States remained largely unchanged until 2006, when the Supreme Court rejected an appeal calling for a reform of the electoral status of Puerto Rico and its citizens' right to vote. In 2012, voters backed a non-binding referendum to become the 51st state of the United States, however no official developments have been made since. On December 15, 2022, the U.S. House of Representatives voted in favor of the Puerto Rico Status Act. The act sought to resolve Puerto Rico's status and its relationship to the United States through a binding plebiscite. In April 2023, Puerto Rico's Status Act, which seeks to resolve its territorial status and relationship with the United States through a binding plebiscite at the federal level, was reintroduced in the House by Democrats..

In September 2023, Roger Wicker reintroduced legislation in the United States Congress on the territorial status of Puerto Rico. a two-round consultation process. The first vote is scheduled for August 4, 2024, where Puerto Ricans will have the choice between four alternatives: annexation to the United States, independence, sovereignty in free association, and a free state associated with the United States.

== Electoral status ==
The voting rights of residents in Puerto Rico differ from those of the residents of any of the fifty constituent states. It plays a role in both congressional and presidential elections, but not to the extent which a state does.

=== Presidential elections ===
The island is not represented by the electoral college and therefore its residents are ineligible to vote in presidential elections, however Puerto Ricans living within the mainland United States are eligible to vote in the state they have settled in. Despite the fact that its residents cannot vote in the main election, Puerto Rico is part of the presidential primaries, and is represented by a number of delegates from both major parties.

=== Congressional elections ===
Residents of Puerto Rico elect their sole representative in the United States House of Representatives, however the position is a non-voting one, and wields no political power within Congress. The congressional election schedule in Puerto Rico follows that of the mainland United States, with biennial elections occurring simultaneously with those of the fifty states. Puerto Rico is not represented in the United States Senate, nor has it ever been.

== 2024 Platforms ==
=== Democratic party 2024 ===
The Democratic Party plans to continue improving Puerto Rico's economic status and wants Puerto Rico to be able to vote in presidential elections, but ultimately leaves the decision and efforts to achieve statehood to the people of Puerto Rico. The Democrats' 2024 platform proposes eventual statehood, independence and free association as alternatives to commonwealth status. in supporting the enactment of the Puerto Rico Status Act (HR2757/S.3231).

=== Republican party 2024 ===
Language from the 2016 Republican platform supporting Puerto Rico's ability to seek statehood is removed from the 2024 Republican platform document. This is the first time since 1972 that a Republican government program does not include text expressing its intention to promote statehood for the Commonwealth of Puerto Rico.

== 2020 Platforms ==
=== Democratic Party 2020 Platform ===
The people of Puerto Rico deserve self-determination on the issue of status.

=== Republican Party 2020 Platform ===
No new 2020 platform adopted, thereby extending the 2016 Platform.

The RNC has unanimously voted to forego the Convention Committee on Platform, in appreciation of the fact that it did not want a small contingent of delegates formulating a new platform without the breadth of perspectives within the ever-growing Republican movement

== 2016 Platforms ==
=== Democratic Party 2016 Platform ===
We are committed to addressing the extraordinary challenges faced by our fellow citizens in Puerto Rico. Many stem from the fundamental question of Puerto Rico's political status. Democrats believe that the people of Puerto Rico should determine their ultimate political status from permanent options that do not conflict with the Constitution, laws, and policies of the United States. Democrats are committed to promoting economic opportunity and good-paying jobs for the hardworking people of Puerto Rico. We also believe that Puerto Ricans must be treated equally by Medicare, Medicaid, and other programs that benefit families. Puerto Ricans should be able to vote for the people who make their laws, just as they should be treated equally. All American citizens, no matter where they reside, should have the right to vote for the President of the United States. Finally, we believe that federal officials must respect Puerto Rico's local self-government as laws are implemented and Puerto Rico's budget and debt are restructured so that it can get on a path towards stability and prosperity.

=== Republican Party 2016 Platform ===
We support the right of the United States citizens of Puerto Rico to be admitted to the Union as a fully sovereign state. We further recognize the historic significance of the 2012 local referendum in which a 54 percent majority voted to end Puerto Rico's current status as a U.S. territory, and 61 percent chose statehood over options for sovereign nationhood. We support the federally sponsored political status referendum authorized and funded by an Act of Congress in 2014 to ascertain the aspirations of the people of Puerto Rico. Once the 2012 local vote for statehood is ratified, Congress should approve an enabling act with terms for Puerto Rico's future admission as the 51st state of the Union.

== 2012 Platforms ==
=== Democratic Party 2012 Platform ===
We commit to moving resolution of the status issue forward with the goal of resolving it expeditiously. If local efforts in Puerto Rico to resolve the status issue do not provide a clear result in the short term, the President should support, and Congress should enact, self-executing legislation that specifies in advance for the people of Puerto Rico a set of clear status options, such as those recommended in the White House Task Force Report on Puerto Rico, which the United States is politically committed to fulfilling.

=== Republican Party 2012 Platform ===
We support the right of the United States citizens of Puerto Rico to be admitted to the Union as a fully sovereign state after they freely so determine. We recognize that Congress has the final authority to define the constitutionally valid options for Puerto Rico to achieve a permanent non-territorial status with government by consent and full enfranchisement. As long as Puerto Rico is not a state, however, the will of its people regarding their political status should be ascertained by means of a general right of referendum or specific referenda sponsored by the U.S. government.

== 2008 Platforms ==
=== Democratic Party 2008 Platform ===
We believe that the people of Puerto Rico have the right to the political status of their choice, obtained through a fair, neutral, and democratic process of self-determination. The White House and Congress will work with all groups in Puerto Rico to enable the question of Puerto Rico's status to be resolved during the next four years. We also believe that economic conditions in Puerto Rico call for effective and equitable programs to maximize job creation and financial investment. Furthermore, in order to provide fair assistance to those in greatest need, the U.S. citizens in Puerto Rico should receive treatment under federal programs that is comparable to that of citizens in the States. We will phase-out the cap on Medicaid funding and phase-in equal participation in other federal health care assistance programs. Moreover, we will provide equitable treatment to the U.S. citizens in Puerto Rico on programs providing refundable tax credits to working families.

=== Republican Party 2008 Platform ===
We support the right of the United States citizens of Puerto Rico to be admitted to the Union as a fully sovereign state after they freely so determine. We recognize that Congress has the final authority to define the constitutionally valid options for Puerto Rico to achieve a permanent non-territorial status with government by consent and full enfranchisement. As long as Puerto Rico is not a state, however, the will of its people regarding their political status should be ascertained by means of a general right of referendum or specific referenda sponsored by the U.S. government.

== 2004 Platforms ==
=== Democratic Party 2004 Platform ===
We believe that four million disenfranchised American citizens residing in Puerto Rico have the

right to the permanent and fully democratic status of their choice. The White House and Congress will clarify the realistic status options for Puerto Rico and enable Puerto Ricans to choose among them.

=== Republican Party 2004 Platform ===
We support the right of the United States citizens of Puerto Rico to be admitted to the Union as a fully sovereign state after they freely so determine. We recognize that Congress has the final authority to define the Constitutionally valid options for Puerto Rico to achieve a permanent non-territorial status with government by consent and full enfranchisement. As long as Puerto Rico is not a state, however, the will of its people regarding their political status should be ascertained by means of a general right of referendum or specific referenda sponsored by the United States government.

== 2000 Platforms ==
=== Democratic Party 2000 Platform ===
Puerto Rico has been under U.S. sovereignty for over a century and Puerto Ricans have been U.S. citizens since 1917, but the island's ultimate status still has not been determined and its 3.9 million residents still do not have voting representation in their national government. These disenfranchised citizens – who have contributed greatly to our country in war and peace – are entitled to the permanent and fully democratic status of their choice. Democrats will continue to work in the White House and Congress to clarify the options and enable them to choose and to obtain such a status from among all realistic options.

=== Republican Party 2000 Platform ===
We support the right of the United States citizens of Puerto Rico to be admitted to the Union as a fully sovereign state after they freely so determine. We recognize that Congress has the final authority to define the constitutionally valid options for Puerto Rico to achieve a permanent status with the government by consent and full enfranchisement. As long as Puerto Rico is not a State, however, the will of its people regarding their political status should be ascertained by means of a general right of referendum or specific referenda sponsored by the United States government.

== See also ==
- Political status of Puerto Rico
- Elections in Puerto Rico
- Democratic Party of Puerto Rico
- Republican Party of Puerto Rico
