= Commonwealth (U.S. insular area) =

Type of organized but unincorporated territory of the United States

Commonwealth is a term used by two unincorporated organized territories of the United States in their full official names. These are the Northern Mariana Islands, whose full name is the Commonwealth of the Northern Mariana Islands, and Puerto Rico, which is named the Commonwealth of Puerto Rico in English and Estado Libre Asociado de Puerto Rico in Spanish, translating to "Free Associated State of Puerto Rico." The term was also used by the Philippines during most of its period under U.S. sovereignty, when it was officially called the Commonwealth of the Philippines.

The definition of commonwealth according to 2013 United States Department of State policy, as codified in the department's Foreign Affairs Manual, reads: "The term 'Commonwealth' does not describe or provide for any specific political status or relationship. It has, for example, been applied to both states and territories. When used in connection with areas under U.S. sovereignty that are not states, the term broadly describes an area that is self-governing under a constitution of its adoption and whose right of self-government will not be unilaterally withdrawn by the U.S. Congress."

== Current commonwealths ==
=== Commonwealth of the Northern Mariana Islands ===
In 1976, Congress approved the mutually negotiated Covenant to Establish a Commonwealth of the Northern Mariana Islands (CNMI) in Political Union with the United States. Prior to November 28, 2009, the Immigration and Nationality Act (INA) did not apply in the CNMI. Rather, a separate immigration system existed in the CNMI. This system was established under the Covenant to Establish a Commonwealth of the Northern Mariana Islands in Political Union with the United States of America ("Covenant"), which was signed in 1975 and codified as 48 U.S.C. § 1801. The covenant was unilaterally amended by the Consolidated Natural Resources Act of 2008 (CNRA) approved by the U.S. Congress on May 8, 2008, thus altering the CNMI's immigration system, making the Immigration and Nationality Act the applicable immigration law of CNMI. (Note: Specifically, CNRA § 702(a) amended the Covenant to state that "the provisions of the 'immigration laws' (as defined in section 101(a)(17) of the Immigration and Nationality Act (8 U.S.C. 1101(a)(17))) shall apply to the Commonwealth of the Northern Mariana Islands."2 Further, under CNRA § 702(a), the "immigration laws", as well as the amendments to the Covenant, "shall ... supersede and replace all laws, provisions, or programs of the Commonwealth relating to the admission of aliens and the removal of aliens from the Commonwealth.")

Transition to U.S. Immigration Law began November 28, 2009 in the Commonwealth of the Northern Mariana Islands (CNMI). CNMI's immigration laws have been replaced by the INA and other U.S. immigration laws.

=== Commonwealth of Puerto Rico ===
Of the current U.S. insular areas, the term was first used by Puerto Rico in 1952 as its formal name in English ("Commonwealth of Puerto Rico"). The formal name in Spanish for Puerto Rico is Estado Libre Asociado de Puerto Rico (lit. 'Free Associated State of Puerto Rico'). The United States acquired the islands of Puerto Rico in 1898 after the Spanish–American War. In 1950, Congress enacted legislation (P.L. 81-600) authorizing Puerto Rico to hold a constitutional convention, and in 1952, the people of Puerto Rico ratified a constitution establishing a republican form of government for the island. Puerto Rico's political relationship with the U.S. has been a continuing source of debate in Puerto Rico, the United States Congress, and the United Nations. The issue revolves around whether Puerto Rico should remain a U.S. territory, become a U.S. state, or become an independent country. The debate has spawned several referendums, presidential executive orders and bills in the U.S. Congress. Ultimately the U.S. Congress is the only body empowered to decide the political status of Puerto Rico, as stated under the Territorial Clause.

Despite the Spanish translation of the term "commonwealth", Puerto Rico's relationship with United States is not a Compact of Free Association (which is the case for the Federated States of Micronesia, Palau, and the Marshall Islands). As sovereign states, these islands have full right to conduct their own foreign relations, while the Commonwealth of Puerto Rico is a territory of the United States.

The territory was organized by the Foraker Act in 1900, which was amended by the Jones–Shafroth Act in 1917. The drafting of the Constitution of Puerto Rico by its residents was authorized by Congress in 1951, and the result approved in 1952. The government of Puerto Rico has held several referendums with the options of U.S. statehood, independence, and commonwealth; the commonwealth option won on multiple plebiscites held in 1967, 1993, and 1998. In 2012, 54% of the voters did not wish to continue the present territorial status. Of the non-territorial statuses, becoming a U.S. state got 61.16% of the votes, Sovereign Free Associate State got 33.34% and Independence got 5.49%. In 2017, 97.18% voted overwhelmingly for statehood, with 1.5% for independence or free association and 1.32% for maintenance of the territorial status. The unusually high percentage of votes for statehood was attributed to a boycott led by the pro-status quo Popular Democrats, leading to a very low turnout of 22.93%, mainly made up of pro-statehood voters.

In 2020, there were only two options on the ballot. 52.52% of voters favored Puerto Rico's immediate admission to the Union and 47.48% voted against it, with a 54.72% turnout.

Puerto Ricans have U.S. citizenship and vote for a resident commissioner of Puerto Rico, with voice but without vote, in the United States House of Representatives. With the exception of federal employees (such as employees of the United States Postal Service, Federal Bureau of Investigation, and servicemembers in all branches of the military) and people who earn their income from outside of the U.S. territories, residents of Puerto Rico generally do not pay federal income taxes, but are required to pay all other federal taxes (such as Social Security and Medicare) and Puerto Rico has no representation in the Electoral College that ultimately chooses the U.S. president and vice president.

Puerto Rico has sports sovereignty, with its own national team at the Olympics and at other international competitions. Puerto Rico also participates in different international organizations such as the Economic Commission for Latin America (ECLA) (associate member), the Organization of Ibero-American States (full member), and the Ibero-American Summit (associate member).

=== Representation in Congress ===
U.S. insular areas are not afforded direct representation in the federal legislature, either in the Senate or in the House of Representatives.

Article I, Section 3 of the Constitution provides that each U.S. state is entitled to two senators, but makes no provision for representation of insular areas in the Senate.

Article I, Section 2 of the Constitution apportions seats in the House of Representatives among the U.S. states by population, with each state being entitled to at least one representative, but makes no provision for representation of insular areas in the House. Insular areas are, however, afforded limited representation in the House by a delegate who may vote in committee but not on the House floor.

== Former commonwealth ==
=== Commonwealth of the Philippines ===
The Commonwealth of the Philippines was an insular area that used "Commonwealth" in its official name, "Commonwealth of the Philippine Islands", from November 15, 1935 until July 4, 1946. The United States recognized the then-future independence of the Philippines in 1934 but called for a ten-year transitional period.

== See also ==
- Commonwealth (U.S. state)
- Politics of Puerto Rico
- Politics of the Northern Mariana Islands
- President's Task Force on Puerto Rico's Status
- Territories of the United States
- U.S. state
