= 1993 Puerto Rican status referendum =

- 14 November 1993

Results
Choice	Votes	%
Commonwealth	826,326	48.89%
Statehood	788,296	46.64%
Independence	75,620	4.47%
Valid votes	1,690,242	99.37%
Invalid or blank votes	10,748	0.63%
Total votes	1,700,990	100.00%
Registered voters/turnout	2,312,912	73.54%
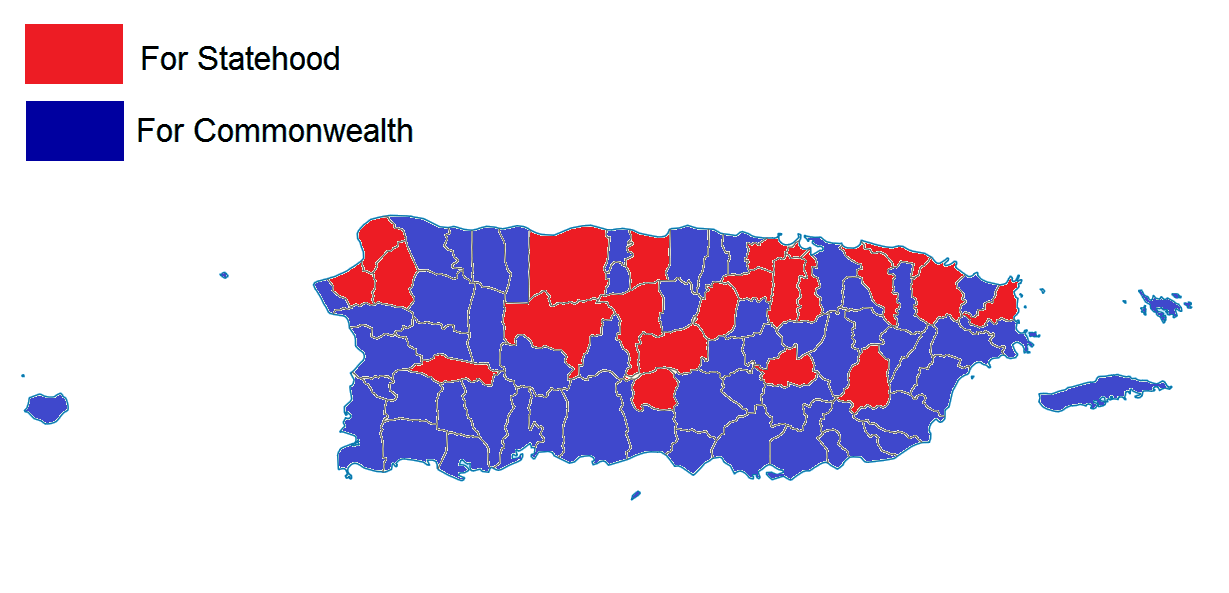
- Results by municipality

A referendum on the political status of the archipelago and island was held in Puerto Rico on 14 November 1993. Voters were given the choice between being a Commonwealth, statehood or independence. A plurality of voters voted for Commonwealth status, with a voter turnout of 73.5%. A previous referendum had been held to decide on the political status of Puerto Rico in 1967.

== Results ==
Choice	Votes	%
Commonwealth	826,326	48.89
Statehood	788,296	46.64
Independence	75,620	4.47
Total	1,690,242	100.00
Valid votes	1,690,242	99.37
Invalid/blank votes	10,748	0.63
Total votes	1,700,990	100.00
Registered voters/turnout	2,312,912	73.54
Source: Nohlen

=== By municipality ===
Municipality	Commonwealth		Statehood		Independence		Null		Blank		Total
Municipality	Votes	%	Votes	%	Votes	%	Votes	%	Votes	%	Total
Adjuntas	4,975	49.2	4,872	48.2	211	2.1	25	0.2	33	0.3	10,116
Aguada	8,721	47.6	8,772	47.9	686	3.7	66	0.4	74	0.4	18,319
Aguadilla	12,822	45.5	14,320	50.8	872	3.1	128	0.5	54	0.2	28,196
Aguas Buenas	6,476	47.3	6,398	46.8	735	5.4	38	0.3	32	0.2	13,679
Aibonito	7,758	59.8	4,466	34.4	675	5.2	37	0.3	30	0.2	12,966
Añasco	7,183	50.5	6,698	47.1	275	1.9	36	0.3	40	0.3	14,232
Arecibo	23,136	46.7	24,524	49.5	1,655	3.3	176	0.4	99	0.2	49,590
Arroyo	4,774	49.6	4,398	45.7	395	4.1	38	0.4	23	0.2	9,628
Barceloneta	5,977	51.4	5,267	45.3	309	2.7	56	0.5	19	0.2	11,628
Barranquitas	6,930	49.7	6,426	46.1	513	3.7	33	0.2	28	0.2	13,930
Bayamón	45,294	42.9	53,797	51.0	5,812	5.5	381	0.4	239	0.2	105,523
Cabo Rojo	10,808	54.1	7,799	39.0	1,253	6.3	65	0.3	68	0.3	19,993
Caguas	31,119	48.8	28,506	44.7	3,757	5.9	249	0.4	130	0.2	63,761
Camuy	8,404	49.1	8,196	47.9	412	2.4	39	0.2	50	0.3	17,101
Canóvanas	9,117	53.0	7,287	42.4	671	3.9	73	0.4	48	0.3	17,196
Carolina	37,202	46.1	38,757	48.0	4,258	5.3	251	0.3	196	0.2	80,664
Cataño	6,232	45.7	6,620	48.5	675	4.9	75	0.5	39	0.3	13,641
Cayey	12,131	54.9	8,703	39.4	1,096	5.0	95	0.4	59	0.3	22,084
Ceiba	3,153	48.6	3,151	48.6	143	2.2	21	0.3	13	0.2	6,481
Ciales	4,581	46.1	5,043	50.7	264	2.7	24	0.2	31	0.3	9,943
Cidra	8,100	46.4	8,279	47.4	967	5.5	69	0.4	49	0.3	17,464
Coamo	8,853	52.4	7,529	44.5	416	2.5	64	0.4	40	0.2	16,902
Comerío	5,509	50.2	4,984	45.4	412	3.8	41	0.4	28	0.3	10,974
Corozal	8,544	47.2	8,929	49.3	535	3.0	61	0.3	49	0.3	18,118
Culebra	605	62.9	313	32.5	33	3.4	8	0.8	3	0.3	962
Dorado	8,632	54.6	6,339	40.1	766	4.8	36	0.2	36	0.2	15,809
Fajardo	7,934	47.4	8,107	48.5	602	3.6	57	0.3	32	0.2	16,732
Florida	2,368	48.0	2,309	46.8	221	4.5	24	0.5	10	0.2	4,932
Guánica	5,050	53.0	4,077	42.8	339	3.6	47	0.5	20	0.2	9,533
Guayama	9,527	52.5	7,773	42.9	699	3.9	89	0.5	50	0.3	18,138
Guayanilla	5,826	55.3	4,113	39.0	529	5.0	43	0.4	30	0.3	10,541
Guaynabo	17,797	40.3	23,418	53.1	2,653	6.0	142	0.3	101	0.2	44,111
Gurabo	7,159	49.4	6,739	46.5	524	3.6	52	0.4	24	0.2	14,498
Hatillo	9,413	50.8	8,599	46.4	458	2.5	36	0.2	39	0.2	18,545
Hormigueros	4,655	54.6	3,440	40.4	376	4.4	31	0.4	17	0.2	8,519
Humacao	14,428	56.0	10,138	39.3	1,006	3.9	139	0.5	73	0.3	25,784
Isabela	10,867	51.3	9,525	45.0	655	3.1	84	0.4	43	0.2	21,174
Jayuya	3,944	48.0	3,926	47.8	292	3.6	33	0.4	26	0.3	8,221
Juana Díaz	10,613	50.9	9,569	45.9	513	2.5	97	0.5	67	0.3	20,859
Juncos	7,455	49.1	7,165	47.2	464	3.1	56	0.4	30	0.2	15,170
Lajas	6,893	56.9	4,768	39.3	377	3.1	54	0.4	31	0.3	12,123
Lares	7,595	49.0	7,212	46.5	615	4.0	61	0.4	31	0.2	15,514
Las Marías	2,963	56.8	2,072	39.7	150	2.9	23	0.4	13	0.2	5,221
Las Piedras	7,406	48.8	7,316	48.2	364	2.4	62	0.4	23	0.2	15,171
Loíza	4,505	41.7	5,835	54.0	371	3.4	59	0.5	30	0.3	10,800
Luquillo	4,397	49.0	4,209	46.9	325	3.6	24	0.3	19	0.2	8,974
Manatí	10,013	47.1	10,316	48.6	773	3.6	86	0.4	58	0.3	21,246
Maricao	1,676	48.1	1,717	49.2	66	1.9	18	0.5	11	0.3	3,488
Maunabo	3,160	49.2	2,877	44.8	334	5.2	35	0.5	17	0.3	6,423
Mayagüez	25,132	52.5	20,189	42.2	2,313	4.8	166	0.3	95	0.2	47,895
Moca	7,725	43.5	9,479	53.4	425	2.4	75	0.4	54	0.3	17,758
Morovis	7,225	52.4	6,187	44.8	299	2.2	45	0.3	45	0.3	13,801
Naguabo	6,138	52.5	5,210	44.6	264	2.3	47	0.4	30	0.3	11,689
Naranjito	8,954	57.6	5,946	38.3	566	3.6	32	0.2	38	0.2	15,536
Orocovis	5,641	47.2	5,929	49.7	298	2.5	28	0.2	43	0.4	11,939
Patillas	5,282	50.7	4,652	44.7	404	3.9	43	0.4	27	0.3	10,408
Peñuelas	5,614	49.3	5,135	45.1	565	5.0	26	0.2	36	0.3	11,376
Ponce	38,635	49.0	35,949	45.6	3,676	4.7	413	0.5	209	0.3	78,882
Quebradillas	5,885	49.5	5,473	46.0	466	3.9	38	0.3	36	0.3	11,898
Rincón	4,076	56.7	2,908	40.5	155	2.2	33	0.5	15	0.2	7,187
Río Grande	9,349	45.7	10,269	50.2	714	3.5	94	0.5	49	0.2	20,475
Sabana Grande	7,876	63.0	4,288	34.3	281	2.2	36	0.3	21	0.2	12,502
Salinas	7,557	57.9	5,013	38.4	373	2.9	71	0.5	39	0.3	13,053
San Germán	10,070	54.8	7,543	41.1	635	3.5	67	0.4	46	0.3	18,361
San Juan	81,492	43.3	92,395	49.1	12,825	6.8	816	0.4	464	0.2	187,992
San Lorenzo	9,020	47.9	9,145	48.5	541	2.9	65	0.3	68	0.4	18,839
San Sebastián	11,731	52.9	9,187	41.4	1,125	5.1	86	0.4	55	0.2	22,184
Santa Isabel	5,458	56.7	3,823	39.7	274	2.8	39	0.4	30	0.3	9,624
Toa Alta	9,109	46.1	9,649	48.9	905	4.6	41	0.2	42	0.2	19,746
Toa Baja	18,106	46.3	18,636	47.7	2,009	5.1	216	0.6	108	0.3	39,075
Trujillo Alto	13,216	47.3	12,674	45.4	1,931	6.9	76	0.3	50	0.2	27,947
Utuado	8,484	45.8	9,415	50.8	493	2.7	83	0.4	45	0.2	18,520
Vega Alta	8,857	52.5	7,270	43.1	625	3.7	82	0.5	41	0.2	16,875
Vega Baja	14,266	52.8	11,544	42.7	1,060	3.9	96	0.4	45	0.2	27,011
Vieques	2,230	49.8	1,988	44.4	215	4.8	23	0.5	18	0.4	4,474
Villalba	5,656	48.3	5,739	49.0	246	2.1	34	0.3	46	0.4	11,721
Yabucoa	10,082	52.0	8,649	44.6	560	2.9	63	0.3	51	0.3	19,405
Yauco	10,780	53.4	8,419	41.7	875	4.3	78	0.4	48	0.2	20,200
Total	826,326	48.6	788,296	46.3	75,620	4.4	6,549	0.4	4,199	0.2	1,700,990
