= 1967 Puerto Rican status referendum =

Ballot measure in Puerto Rico

- 23 July 1967

Results
| Choice | Votes | % |
|---|---|---|
| Commonwealth | 425,132 | 60.41% |
| Statehood | 274,312 | 38.98% |
| Independence | 4,248 | 0.60% |
| Valid votes | 703,692 | 99.49% |
| Invalid or blank votes | 3,601 | 0.51% |
| Total votes | 707,293 | 100.00% |
| Registered voters/turnout | 1,067,349 | 66.27% |
- Commonwealth: 50–60% 60–70% 70–80% 80–90% >90% Statehood: 50–60%

A referendum on the status of the archipelago and island was held in Puerto Rico on 23 July 1967. Voters were given the choice between being a Commonwealth, statehood or independence. The majority of voters voted for Commonwealth status. This was the first of several referendums held to decide on the political status of Puerto Rico.

The major pro-statehood party, the Partido Estadista Republicano, boycotted the referendum. As a result of its stance, several dissidents left the party to form the New Progressive Party.

== Results ==
| Choice | Votes | % |
|---|---|---|
| Commonwealth | 425,132 | 60.41 |
| Statehood | 274,312 | 38.98 |
| Independence | 4,248 | 0.60 |
| Total | 703,692 | 100.00 |
| Valid votes | 703,692 | 99.49 |
| Invalid/blank votes | 3,601 | 0.51 |
| Total votes | 707,293 | 100.00 |
| Registered voters/turnout | 1,067,349 | 66.27 |
Source: Nohlen

=== By municipality ===
| Municipality | Commonwealth | | Statehood | | Independence | | Invalid/Blank | | Total |
| Municipality | Votes | % | Votes | % | Votes | % | Votes | % | Total |
|---|---|---|---|---|---|---|---|---|---|
| Ponce | 20,114 | 46.4 | 22,950 | 52.9 | 304 | 0.7 | 133 | 0.31 | 43,501 |
| San Lorenzo | 4,213 | 48.4 | 4,475 | 51.4 | 12 | 0.1 | 39 | 0.45 | 8,739 |
| Cataño | 3,258 | 48.6 | 3,424 | 51.1 | 23 | 0.3 | 19 | 0.28 | 6,724 |
| Corozal | 3,787 | 49.4 | 3,856 | 50.3 | 24 | 0.3 | 38 | 0.49 | 7,705 |
| San Juan | 63,496 | 50.5 | 60,823 | 48.4 | 1,305 | 1 | 434 | 0.34 | 126,058 |
| Guaynabo | 7,263 | 52.1 | 6,575 | 47.2 | 92 | 0.7 | 48 | 0.34 | 13,978 |
| Juana Díaz | 4,730 | 53.4 | 4,097 | 46.3 | 27 | 0.3 | 34 | 0.38 | 8,888 |
| Bayamón | 17,264 | 53.2 | 14,919 | 46 | 276 | 0.9 | 89 | 0.27 | 32,548 |
| Moca | 3,409 | 54.6 | 2,816 | 45.1 | 13 | 0.2 | 45 | 0.72 | 6,283 |
| Adjuntas | 3,262 | 55.1 | 2,640 | 44.6 | 16 | 0.3 | 32 | 0.54 | 5,950 |
| Fajardo | 3,920 | 54.9 | 3,175 | 44.5 | 42 | 0.6 | 29 | 0.40 | 7,166 |
| Aguada | 3,200 | 56.2 | 2,459 | 43.2 | 33 | 0.6 | 54 | 0.94 | 5,746 |
| Jayuya | 2,325 | 57.2 | 1,736 | 42.7 | 7 | 0.2 | 32 | 0.78 | 4,100 |
| Orocovis | 3,303 | 57.3 | 2,456 | 42.6 | 9 | 0.2 | 20 | 0.35 | 5,788 |
| Coamo | 4,267 | 57.2 | 3,170 | 42.5 | 19 | 0.3 | 47 | 0.63 | 7,503 |
| Peñuelas | 2,713 | 57.4 | 1,997 | 42.2 | 20 | 0.4 | 26 | 0.55 | 4,756 |
| Las Piedras | 3,547 | 58.2 | 2,528 | 41.5 | 16 | 0.3 | 17 | 0.28 | 6,108 |
| Villalba | 2,731 | 58.6 | 1,915 | 41.1 | 14 | 0.3 | 23 | 0.49 | 4,683 |
| Guánica | 2,650 | 58.4 | 1,850 | 40.8 | 38 | 0.8 | 42 | 0.92 | 4,580 |
| Caguas | 12,541 | 58.7 | 8,689 | 40.7 | 123 | 0.6 | 95 | 0.44 | 21,448 |
| Naguabo | 3,537 | 59.1 | 2,427 | 40.6 | 17 | 0.3 | 26 | 0.43 | 6,007 |
| Santa Isabel | 2,581 | 59.4 | 1,736 | 40 | 25 | 0.6 | 19 | 0.44 | 4,361 |
| Carolina | 9,247 | 60.3 | 5,973 | 39 | 109 | 0.7 | 57 | 0.37 | 15,386 |
| Juncos | 4,468 | 61 | 2,829 | 38.6 | 26 | 0.4 | 27 | 0.37 | 7,350 |
| Aguadilla | 6,647 | 61 | 4,186 | 38.4 | 68 | 0.6 | 67 | 0.61 | 10,968 |
| Utuado | 5,820 | 61.1 | 3,651 | 38.3 | 50 | 0.5 | 32 | 0.33 | 9,553 |
| Cidra | 3,387 | 61.5 | 2,096 | 38.1 | 25 | 0.5 | 33 | 0.60 | 5,541 |
| Yauco | 6,254 | 62 | 3,784 | 37.5 | 51 | 0.5 | 57 | 0.56 | 10,146 |
| Ceiba | 1,575 | 62.5 | 939 | 37.2 | 8 | 0.3 | 15 | 0.59 | 2,537 |
| Rincón | 3,692 | 62.4 | 2,198 | 37.1 | 28 | 0.5 | 27 | 0.45 | 5,945 |
| Toa Baja | 4,407 | 62.6 | 2,602 | 37 | 30 | 0.4 | 51 | 0.72 | 7,090 |
| Guayanilla | 3,324 | 62.4 | 1,969 | 37 | 32 | 0.6 | 47 | 0.87 | 5,372 |
| Toa Alta | 3,170 | 64.1 | 1,765 | 35.7 | 13 | 0.3 | 13 | 0.26 | 4,961 |
| Patillas | 3,228 | 64.9 | 1,734 | 34.9 | 13 | 0.3 | 38 | 0.76 | 5,013 |
| Añasco | 3,490 | 64.9 | 1,858 | 34.6 | 29 | 0.5 | 28 | 0.52 | 5,405 |
| Trujillo Alto | 4,144 | 64.8 | 2,196 | 34.4 | 51 | 0.8 | 26 | 0.41 | 6,417 |
| Vega Baja | 5,798 | 65.4 | 3,032 | 34.2 | 38 | 0.4 | 57 | 0.64 | 8,925 |
| Arroyo | 2,443 | 65.8 | 1,239 | 33.4 | 33 | 0.9 | 26 | 0.70 | 3,741 |
| Barceloneta | 4,593 | 66.5 | 2,282 | 33 | 32 | 0.5 | 31 | 0.45 | 6,938 |
| Hatillo | 4,271 | 66.5 | 2,119 | 33 | 30 | 0.5 | 43 | 0.67 | 6,463 |
| Guayama | 6,196 | 66.8 | 3,041 | 32.8 | 42 | 0.5 | 51 | 0.55 | 9,330 |
| Manatí | 5,975 | 66.8 | 2,938 | 32.8 | 31 | 0.3 | 41 | 0.46 | 8,985 |
| San Sebastián | 5,405 | 66.8 | 2,654 | 32.8 | 38 | 0.5 | 71 | 0.87 | 8,168 |
| Lares | 4,504 | 67.1 | 2,178 | 32.4 | 35 | 0.5 | 34 | 0.50 | 6,751 |
| Camuy | 4,268 | 68.1 | 1,984 | 31.6 | 18 | 0.3 | 37 | 0.59 | 6,307 |
| Aibonito | 3,743 | 68.3 | 1,725 | 31.5 | 15 | 0.3 | 20 | 0.36 | 5,503 |
| Mayagüez | 15,424 | 67.6 | 7,174 | 31.5 | 211 | 0.9 | 195 | 0.85 | 23,004 |
| Yabucoa | 6,065 | 68.3 | 2,774 | 31.3 | 36 | 0.4 | 72 | 0.80 | 8,947 |
| Ciales | 3,270 | 68.9 | 1,466 | 30.9 | 7 | 0.1 | 30 | 0.63 | 4,773 |
| San Germán | 5,262 | 68.4 | 2,363 | 30.7 | 70 | 0.9 | 76 | 0.98 | 7,771 |
| Cayey | 7,869 | 69.3 | 3,450 | 30.4 | 34 | 0.3 | 46 | 0.40 | 11,399 |
| Barranquitas | 3,622 | 69.7 | 1,556 | 29.9 | 18 | 0.3 | 39 | 0.74 | 5,235 |
| Quebradillas | 2,624 | 69.9 | 1,111 | 29.6 | 21 | 0.6 | 46 | 1.21 | 3,802 |
| Comerío | 3,626 | 70 | 1,526 | 29.5 | 28 | 0.5 | 19 | 0.37 | 5,199 |
| Morovis | 3,863 | 70.4 | 1,615 | 29.4 | 9 | 0.2 | 38 | 0.69 | 5,525 |
| Naranjito | 4,464 | 70.5 | 1,851 | 29.2 | 20 | 0.3 | 32 | 0.50 | 6,367 |
| Dorado | 3,344 | 70.6 | 1,368 | 28.9 | 23 | 0.5 | 28 | 0.59 | 4,763 |
| Gurabo | 4,285 | 71.3 | 1,700 | 28.3 | 27 | 0.4 | 23 | 0.38 | 6,035 |
| Luquillo | 2,468 | 71.4 | 975 | 28.2 | 12 | 0.3 | 27 | 0.78 | 3,482 |
| Humacao | 7,975 | 71.6 | 3,127 | 28.1 | 44 | 0.4 | 36 | 0.32 | 11,182 |
| Cabo Rojo | 4,478 | 71.1 | 1,767 | 28 | 56 | 0.9 | 58 | 0.91 | 6,359 |
| Río Grande | 2,118 | 72.2 | 802 | 27.3 | 13 | 0.4 | 35 | 1.18 | 2,968 |
| Hormigueros | 1,806 | 72 | 681 | 27.1 | 23 | 0.9 | 33 | 1.30 | 2,543 |
| Arecibo | 14,999 | 73.3 | 5,370 | 26.2 | 100 | 0.5 | 136 | 0.66 | 20,605 |
| Aguas Buenas | 3,067 | 73.9 | 1,074 | 25.9 | 9 | 0.2 | 15 | 0.36 | 4,165 |
| Salinas | 4,916 | 73.8 | 1,718 | 25.8 | 29 | 0.4 | 33 | 0.49 | 6,696 |
| Lajas | 3,490 | 74.2 | 1,189 | 25.3 | 23 | 0.5 | 31 | 0.65 | 4,733 |
| Vega Alta | 3,771 | 75.7 | 1,199 | 24.1 | 14 | 0.3 | 33 | 0.66 | 5,017 |
| Sabana Grande | 4,346 | 76.7 | 1,313 | 23.2 | 10 | 0.2 | 55 | 0.96 | 5,724 |
| Loíza | 6,233 | 76.6 | 1,863 | 22.9 | 37 | 0.5 | 24 | 0.29 | 8,157 |
| Maunabo | 2,273 | 78.2 | 619 | 21.3 | 15 | 0.5 | 38 | 1.29 | 2,945 |
| Isabela | 5,530 | 78.6 | 1,476 | 21 | 32 | 0.5 | 76 | 1.07 | 7,114 |
| Vieques | 1,911 | 78.7 | 507 | 20.9 | 9 | 0.4 | 14 | 0.57 | 2,441 |
| Las Marías | 1,969 | 80 | 483 | 19.6 | 8 | 0.3 | 24 | 0.97 | 2,484 |
| Maricao | 1,457 | 80.6 | 344 | 19 | 6 | 0.3 | 15 | 0.82 | 1,822 |
| Culebra | 222 | 91.4 | 19 | 7.8 | 2 | 0.8 | 4 | 1.62 | 247 |
| Absent Votes | 225 | 60.2 | 147 | 39.3 | 2 | 0.5 | | 0.00 | 374 |
| Total | 425,132 | 60.11 | 274,312 | 38.78 | 4,248 | 0.60 | 3,601 | 0.51 | 707,293 |
