= 1998 Puerto Rican status referendum =

- 13 December 1998
- We, the People, in the searches of the power vested upon us by the First Amendment of the Constitution of the United States, do hereby firmly petition the Congress of the United States, that with all deliberate haste, and after one hundred years of political subordination, the political condition of the People of Puerto Rico and the scope of the sovereignty of the United States of America be defined in an unequivocal manner in order to resolve the present territorial problem of the island under the following options

Results
Statehood	46.6%
Independence	2.6%
Free association	0.3%
Territorial commonwealth	0.1%
None of the above	50.5%
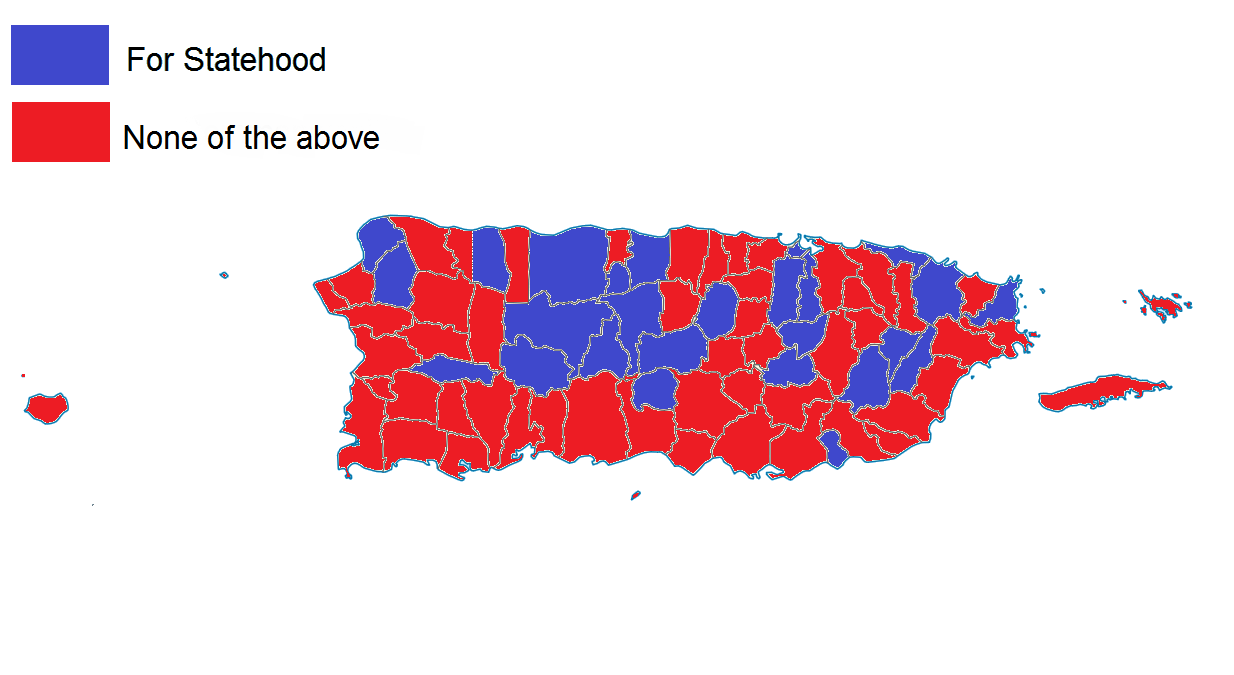
- Results by municipality

A referendum on the political status of Puerto Rico was held on December 13, 1998, five years after an inconclusive result in a 1993 status referendum.

Five alternatives were listed on the ballot: limited self-government, free association, statehood, sovereignty and none of the above. Disputes arose as to the definition of each of the ballot alternatives; and commonwealth advocates, among others, urged voters to vote for "none of the above", asserting that the commonwealth definition on the ballot "failed to recognize both the constitutional protections afforded to our U.S. citizenship and the fact that the relationship is based upon the mutual consent of Puerto Rico and the United States."

A slim majority of voters (50.5%) voted for the none of the above option.

== Definition of status options ==
The resulting political climate after the 1998 plebiscite reflected the need for proper definitions of status options.

In its June 2011, Political Status of Puerto Rico: Options for Congress report, the Congressional Research Service states that the "definitions or, more specifically, the lack of definitions of the political status options for Puerto Rico, compound the complexity of the debate." The report stated that constitutional implications of three status options ("new commonwealth," statehood, and independence) were reviewed by the Department of Justice in response to a congressional request. The history of debate, particularly the 1998 plebiscite, indicates that in the absence of constitutionally valid status options and definitions acceptable to Congress, the debate over status yields few or no conclusive results. The brief summaries of the options analysis on pages 26 and 27 of the report follow:

Commonwealth
The commonwealth option represents a continuation of the current status of Puerto Rico. The territorial clause of the United States Constitution empowers Congress with the authority to regulate territories. Commonwealth status for Puerto Rico is based on statutory provisions and the Constitution of Puerto Rico that established a republican form of self-government. (Puerto Rico Federal Relations Act, P.L. 81-600, 64 Stat. 319). Under current federal law, residents of Puerto Rico enjoy U.S. citizenship, but many contend that the Puerto Rican identity reflects a degree of autonomy that enables the island to remain somewhat separate from, but part of, the United States. On the 1992, "Memorandum for the Heads of Executive Departments and Agencies" of President George H.W. Bush, it described the relationship of the Commonwealth to the United States with regard to the administration of federal programs, as follows: "Because Puerto Rico's degree of constitutional self-government, population, and size set it apart from other areas also subject to federal jurisdiction under Article IV, section 3, clause 2 of the Constitution, I hereby direct all federal departments, agencies, and officials, to the extent consistent with the Constitution and the laws of the United States, hence-forward to treat Puerto Rico administratively as if it were a state, except insofar as doing so with respect to an existing federal program or activity would increase or decrease federal receipts or expenditures, or would seriously disrupt the operation of such program or activity." Some support an enhanced or "new" commonwealth status and seek changes in the current relationship to increase the autonomy of Puerto Rico. Aspects of enhanced commonwealth considered but rejected by Congress in 1991 and 2001 included providing the government of Puerto Rico authority to certify that certain federal laws would not be applicable to the commonwealth, mandating that the President consult with the governor on appointments to federal offices in Puerto Rico that require Senate approval, recognizing a permanent relationship between Puerto Rico and the United States that cannot be unilaterally changed, and establishing economic relationships with other nations. Concepts associated with enhanced or new commonwealth have not been published in 2005, but the former governor has reportedly sought additional sovereign authority that would enable Puerto Rico's government officials to negotiate international agreements and establish new intergovernmental fiscal relations with the federal government. The Department of Justice (Raben Letter) found that certain aspects of a "New Commonwealth" proposal described in PDP platform documents could be, or are: "constitutionally unenforceable" or flawed (mutual consent provisions and delegation of powers), of uncertain legality (statutory citizenship, and international agreements), and possibly subject to constitutional limits (Resident Commissioner authority).
Free association
This option would establish Puerto Rico as a sovereign nation separate from, but legally bound (on a terminable basis) to, the United States. As a general practice, free association would be preceded by recognition that Puerto Rico is a self-governing sovereign nation not part of the United States, because compacts of free association are legal documents between sovereign nations. Free association could be accompanied by a transition period in which the United States would continue to administer certain services and provide assistance to the island for a period of time specified in the compact. Free association could be annulled at any time by either nation. Negotiations over free association would likely decide issues of trade, defense, currency, and economic aid.
Independence
Some advocates of independence contend that the cultural identity of Puerto Ricans, and other factors, justify independence. As residents of a sovereign independent nation, Puerto Ricans could develop closer ties to Caribbean nations, but would likely be forced to choose between citizenship in the United States or in Puerto Rico. The current unrestricted travel between the United States and the island might end, as would federal benefits (unless specified in the enabling legislation). Puerto Rico would, as a sovereign nation, develop its own economy, form of government, and complete national identity.
Statehood
Advocates of statehood contend that the full rights and responsibilities of citizenship should be granted to residents of Puerto Rico. Political stability, particularly as an economic development tool, is seen by some to be one significant advantage of statehood. As residents of a state, Puerto Ricans would be entitled to full representation in Congress, would be subject to income taxes, and would be eligible to receive federal assistance like that provided to all of the states. Opponents argue that statehood would result in a loss of national identity.

== Results ==
Choice	Votes	%
Statehood	728,157	46.63
Independence	39,838	2.55
Free association	4,536	0.29
Territorial Commonwealth	993	0.06
None of the above	787,900	50.46
Total	1,561,424	100.00
Valid votes	1,561,424	99.69
Invalid/blank votes	4,846	0.31
Total votes	1,566,270	100.00
Registered voters/turnout	2,197,824	71.26
Source: Nohlen

=== By municipality ===
Results of the 1998 Puerto Rican status referendum by municipality
Municipality	None of the above		Statehood		Independence		Free Association		Territorial commonwealth		Null		Blank		Total
Municipality	Votes	%	Votes	%	Votes	%	Votes	%	Votes	%	Votes	%	Votes	%	Total
Loíza	3,950	41.6	5,286	55.7	215	2.3	16	0.2	8	0.1	12	0.1	11	0.1	9,498
Moca	7,995	44	9,794	53.9	291	1.6	35	0.2	11	0.1	31	0.2	26	0.1	18,183
Maricao	1,531	44.8	1,801	52.7	54	1.6	6	0.2	3	0.1	11	0.3	10	0.3	3,416
Villalba	4,973	45.7	5,660	52.1	169	1.6	19	0.2	3	0	14	0.1	33	0.3	10,871
Aguadilla	12,167	45.7	13,787	51.8	509	1.9	52	0.2	22	0.1	53	0.2	24	0.1	26,614
Guaynabo	18,332	44.9	20,935	51.3	1,190	2.9	204	0.5	40	0.1	69	0.2	32	0.1	40,802
Las Piedras	6,792	46.7	7,452	51.2	226	1.6	27	0.2	7	0	29	0.2	15	0.1	14,548
Adjuntas	4,247	47	4,572	50.6	148	1.6	21	0.2	8	0.1	15	0.2	27	0.3	9,038
Manatí	8,783	46.4	9,590	50.6	435	2.3	61	0.3	12	0.1	32	0.2	24	0.1	18,937
Florida	2,458	45.5	2,732	50.5	186	3.4	15	0.3	2	0	9	0.2	6	0.1	5,408
Ciales	4,580	47.7	4,820	50.2	146	1.5	12	0.1	2	0	13	0.1	21	0.2	9,594
Río Grande	8,546	47	9,100	50	409	2.2	55	0.3	16	0.1	43	0.2	22	0.1	18,191
Bayamón	43,912	47	46,435	49.7	2,488	2.7	320	0.3	56	0.1	174	0.2	80	0.1	93,465
Camuy	8,190	48.2	8,442	49.7	254	1.5	34	0.2	9	0.1	30	0.2	32	0.2	16,991
Fajardo	6,660	47.2	7,015	49.7	344	2.4	34	0.2	19	0.1	32	0.2	15	0.1	14,119
San Lorenzo	8,067	47.7	8,405	49.7	313	1.9	39	0.2	11	0.1	36	0.2	26	0.2	16,897
Cidra	7,762	45.8	8,377	49.5	687	4.1	50	0.3	8	0	36	0.2	17	0.1	16,937
Jayuya	3,961	47.7	4,104	49.5	181	2.2	16	0.2	5	0.1	18	0.2	14	0.2	8,299
Juncos	6,555	47.9	6,769	49.5	271	2	20	0.1	10	0.1	27	0.2	19	0.1	13,671
Arroyo	4,058	47	4,261	49.3	266	3.1	14	0.2	6	0.1	20	0.2	11	0.1	8,636
Arecibo	21,024	48.1	21,528	49.2	915	2.1	96	0.2	20	0	83	0.2	59	0.1	43,725
Utuado	7,688	48.7	7,757	49.2	248	1.6	25	0.2	7	0	34	0.2	21	0.1	15,780
Corozal	8,501	48.8	8,533	48.9	308	1.8	24	0.1	8	0	30	0.2	29	0.2	17,433
Cataño	6,052	48.2	6,124	48.7	303	2.4	43	0.3	7	0.1	24	0.2	14	0.1	12,567
Orocovis	5,917	49.4	5,826	48.6	167	1.4	11	0.1	6	0.1	35	0.3	19	0.2	11,981
Aguada	9,044	49	8,885	48.1	383	2.1	48	0.3	9	0	35	0.2	49	0.3	18,453
Aguas Buenas	5,989	47.6	6,037	48	491	3.9	30	0.2	2	0	17	0.1	15	0.1	12,581
Quebradillas	6,095	49.3	5,934	48	273	2.2	29	0.2	3	0	23	0.2	11	0.1	12,368
Añasco	6,632	50.2	6,334	47.9	186	1.4	28	0.2	3	0	19	0.1	17	0.1	13,219
Lares	7,282	49.4	7,033	47.7	359	2.4	35	0.2	4	0	20	0.1	14	0.1	14,747
Maunabo	2,838	48.3	2,805	47.7	197	3.4	9	0.2	6	0.1	10	0.2	10	0.2	5,875
Ceiba	2,782	49.9	2,647	47.5	107	1.9	15	0.3	5	0.1	10	0.2	10	0.2	5,576
Comerío	5,099	49.7	4,869	47.5	249	2.4	14	0.1	2	0	12	0.1	10	0.1	10,255
Juana Díaz	9,737	50.4	9,125	47.3	321	1.7	38	0.2	3	0	45	0.2	33	0.2	19,302
Toa Alta	10,353	49.8	9,794	47.2	511	2.5	55	0.3	7	0	41	0.2	11	0.1	20,772
Toa Baja	17,324	49.5	16,496	47.1	958	2.7	99	0.3	24	0.1	74	0.2	29	0.1	35,004
Hatillo	8,888	50.7	8,220	46.9	326	1.9	42	0.2	9	0.1	20	0.1	19	0.1	17,524
Peñuelas	5,314	48.5	5,139	46.9	429	3.9	28	0.3	8	0.1	19	0.2	23	0.2	10,960
Barranquitas	6,938	50.6	6,404	46.7	298	2.2	17	0.1	7	0.1	24	0.2	12	0.1	13,700
Carolina	36,565	50	34,151	46.7	1,870	2.6	253	0.3	43	0.1	115	0.2	61	0.1	73,058
Luquillo	4,029	50.7	3,699	46.6	158	2	33	0.4	2	0	12	0.2	9	0.1	7,942
Patillas	4,706	50	4,383	46.6	252	2.7	22	0.2	7	0.1	18	0.2	20	0.2	9,408
San Juan	82,427	49.4	77,537	46.5	5,490	3.3	871	0.5	135	0.1	309	0.2	135	0.1	166,904
Gurabo	7,051	50.6	6,460	46.4	334	2.4	39	0.3	9	0.1	27	0.2	9	0.1	13,929
Isabela	10,871	51.2	9,844	46.4	388	1.8	42	0.2	5	0	37	0.2	33	0.2	21,220
Guayama	8,290	50.5	7,551	46	442	2.7	38	0.2	11	0.1	48	0.3	23	0.1	16,403
Yabucoa	9,451	51.5	8,435	46	353	1.9	32	0.2	16	0.1	39	0.2	25	0.1	18,351
Naguabo	5,500	51.6	4,878	45.8	208	2	19	0.2	4	0	28	0.3	13	0.1	10,650
Ponce	34,690	50.8	31,264	45.8	1,830	2.7	204	0.3	52	0.1	139	0.2	87	0.1	68,266
Coamo	8,344	52.7	7,178	45.3	239	1.5	21	0.1	11	0.1	24	0.2	20	0.1	15,837
Las Marías	2,805	52.4	2,411	45.1	105	2	6	0.1	1	0	8	0.1	12	0.2	5,348
San Germán	8,605	52	7,432	44.9	375	2.3	63	0.4	17	0.1	38	0.2	27	0.2	16,557
Guánica	4,659	52	4,005	44.7	250	2.8	22	0.2	7	0.1	13	0.1	9	0.1	8,965
Morovis	7,237	53.5	6,036	44.6	204	1.5	17	0.1	3	0	18	0.1	23	0.2	13,538
Caguas	30,388	52.3	25,582	44	1,787	3.1	190	0.3	40	0.1	116	0.2	46	0.1	58,149
Trujillo Alto	14,112	51.9	11,973	44	901	3.3	115	0.4	18	0.1	45	0.2	21	0.1	27,185
Barceloneta	5,552	54.1	4,501	43.9	151	1.5	12	0.1	3	0	24	0.2	11	0.1	10,254
Canóvanas	8,405	53.1	6,945	43.9	352	2.2	45	0.3	9	0.1	47	0.3	15	0.1	15,818
San Sebastián	11,335	52.2	9,499	43.7	748	3.4	59	0.3	12	0.1	43	0.2	32	0.1	21,728
Vega Alta	8,548	53.5	6,975	43.6	362	2.3	42	0.3	8	0.1	38	0.2	19	0.1	15,992
Vega Baja	13,559	54	10,801	43	625	2.5	47	0.2	12	0	50	0.2	23	0.1	25,117
Yauco	9,947	53.7	7,879	42.6	556	3	49	0.3	18	0.1	27	0.1	34	0.2	18,510
Mayagüez	22,611	53.9	17,847	42.5	1,191	2.8	141	0.3	27	0.1	96	0.2	49	0.1	41,962
Santa Isabel	4,786	54.9	3,702	42.5	170	2	21	0.2	5	0.1	6	0.1	21	0.2	8,711
Rincón	4,093	55.9	3,082	42.1	97	1.3	11	0.2	4	0.1	21	0.3	15	0.2	7,323
Cayey	11,228	54.2	8,706	42	629	3	63	0.3	21	0.1	29	0.1	34	0.2	20,710
Hormigueros	4,407	54.2	3,408	41.9	268	3.3	19	0.2	7	0.1	12	0.1	16	0.2	8,137
Lajas	6,450	56.1	4,750	41.3	238	2.1	24	0.2	9	0.1	15	0.1	18	0.2	11,504
Cabo Rojo	10,252	53.9	7,839	41.2	796	4.2	62	0.3	10	0.1	48	0.3	23	0.1	19,030
Humacao	13,184	56.1	9,577	40.8	567	2.4	73	0.3	23	0.1	41	0.2	26	0.1	23,491
Guayanilla	5,411	55.3	3,934	40.2	378	3.9	16	0.2	3	0	24	0.2	24	0.2	9,790
Vieques	2,207	56.2	1,580	40.2	110	2.8	7	0.2	2	0.1	12	0.3	12	0.3	3,930
Salinas	6,726	57.2	4,693	39.9	259	2.2	28	0.2	5	0	17	0.1	26	0.2	11,754
Dorado	8,547	57.2	5,887	39.4	426	2.9	27	0.2	13	0.1	34	0.2	10	0.1	14,944
Culebra	492	57	336	38.9	28	3.2	0	0	4	0.5	1	0.1	2	0.2	863
Naranjito	8,924	59.4	5,749	38.3	298	2	18	0.1	8	0.1	19	0.1	12	0.1	15,028
Sabana Grande	7,257	60.5	4,425	36.9	238	2	27	0.2	8	0.1	19	0.2	15	0.1	11,989
Aibonito	7,233	60.1	4,396	36.5	354	2.9	22	0.2	3	0	20	0.2	10	0.1	12,038
Total	787,900	50.3	728,157	46.5	39,838	2.5	4,536	0.3	993	0.1	2,956	0.2	1,890	0.1	1,566,270
