= Soberanismo =

Soberanismo (lit. "pursuit of sovereignty") is a term used in the Spanish language when referring to different political movements that seek a non-subordinated status for certain autonomous or semi-autonomous territories, and may refer to:

- Free association movement in Puerto Rico
- Catalan independence movement in Spain and France
- Basque independence movement in Spain and France

== See also ==
- Souverainism
