= Puerto Rico status referendums =

Votes on national political status

Three main alternatives are generally presented to Puerto Rican voters during Puerto Rico political status referendums: full independence, maintenance or enhancement of the current commonwealth status, and full statehood into the American Union. The exact expectations for each of these status formulas are a matter of debate by a given position's adherents and detractors. Puerto Ricans have proposed positions that modify the three alternatives above, such as (a) indemnified independence with phased-out US subsidy, (b) expanded political but not fiscal autonomy, and (c) statehood with a gradual phasing out of federal tax exemption. (Note: Contrary to common misconception, residents of Puerto Rico do pay U.S. federal taxes: customs taxes (which are subsequently returned to the Puerto Rico Treasury) (See "PUERTO RICO - Office of Insular Affairs (OIA) - U.S. Department of the Interior". Archived from the original on 2012-06-10. Dept of the Interior, Office of Insular Affairs.), import/export taxes (See "Puerto Rico - Wellsphere". Archived from the original on 2010-04-01.), federal commodity taxes (See "Puerto Rico - Wellsphere". Archived from the original on 2010-04-01.), social security taxes (See https://www.irs.gov/taxtopics/tc903.html), etc. Residents pay federal payroll taxes, such as Social Security (See https://www.irs.gov/taxtopics/tc903.html ) and Medicare (See https://www.reuters.com/article/healthNews/idUSTRE58N5X320090924), as well as Commonwealth of Puerto Rico income taxes (See http://www.puertorico-herald.org/issues/2003/vol7n19/USNotInnocent-en.html and "HTR-Del Valle & Nieves, PSC". Archived from the original on 2011-04-29.). All federal employees (See "D.C. Voting Rights: No Representation? No Taxation!". Archived from the original on 2010-02-10.), those who do business with the federal government (See "Archived copy" (PDF). Archived from the original (PDF) on 2010-01-16.), Puerto Rico-based corporations that intend to send funds to the U.S. (See http://www.jct.gov/x-24-06.pdf Page 9, line 1.), and some others (For example, Puerto Rican residents that are members of the U.S. military, See "D.C. Voting Rights: No Representation? No Taxation!". Archived from the original on 2010-02-10.; and Puerto Rico residents who earned income from sources outside Puerto Rico, See http://www.jct.gov/x-24-06.pdf , pp 14–15.) also pay federal income taxes. In addition, because the cutoff point for income taxation is lower than that of the U.S. IRS code, and because the per-capita income in Puerto Rico is much lower than the average per-capita income on the mainland, more Puerto Rico residents pay income taxes to the local taxation authority (i.e., the government of the Commonwealth of Puerto Rico) than if the IRS code were applied to the island. This occurs because "the Commonwealth of Puerto Rico government has a wider set of responsibilities than do U.S. State and local governments" (See http://www.gao.gov/products/GAO-06-541). As residents of Puerto Rico pay into Social Security, Puerto Ricans are eligible for Social Security benefits upon retirement, but are excluded from the Supplemental Security Income (SSI) (Commonwealth of Puerto Rico residents, unlike residents of the Commonwealth of the Northern Mariana Islands and residents of the 50 States, do not receive the SSI. See http://www.socialsecurity.gov/OP_Home/handbook/handbook.21/handbook-2114.html), and the island actually receives less than 15% of the Medicaid funding it would normally receive if it were a U.S. state (See http://www.magiccarpetautotransport.com/auto-transport/puerto-rico-auto-transport.php). However, Medicare providers receive less-than-full state-like reimbursements for services rendered to beneficiaries in Puerto Rico, even though the latter paid fully into the system (See "PRFAA | News & Media". Archived from the original on 2011-05-11.). It has also been estimated (See http://www.eagleforum.org/column/2007/mar07/07-03-28.html) that, because the population of the Island is greater than that of 50% of the States, if it were a state, Puerto Rico would have six to eight seats in the U.S. Congress' House of Representatives, in addition to the two seats in the Senate.(See http://www.eagleforum.org/column/2007/mar07/07-03-28.html , http://www.crf-usa.org/bill-of-rights-in-action/bria-17-4-c.html# and http://www.thomas.gov/cgi-bin/cpquery/?&sid=cp1109rs5H&refer=&r_n=hr597.110 [Note that for the later, the official US Congress database website, you will need to resubmit a query. The document in question is called "House Report 110-597 – PUERTO RICO DEMOCRACY ACT OF 2007." These are the steps to follow: http://www.thomas.gov --> Committee Reports --> 110 --> drop down "Word/Phrase" and pick "Report Number" --> type "597" next to Report Number. This will provide the document "House Report 110-597 – PUERTO RICO DEMOCRACY ACT OF 2007", then from the Table of Contents choose "BACKGROUND AND NEED FOR LEGISLATION".]). Another misconception is that the import/export taxes collected by the U.S. on products manufactured in Puerto Rico are all returned to the Puerto Rico Treasury. This is not the case. Such import/export taxes are returned only for rum products, and even then the US Treasury keeps a portion of those taxes (See the "House Report 110-597 – PUERTO RICO DEMOCRACY ACT OF 2007" mentioned above.))

Regardless of the outcome of the referendum or the vote on the bill, action by the United States Congress would be necessary to implement changes to the status of Puerto Rico under the Territorial Clause of the United States Constitution. The United States has been preparing for the outcome of a binding-referendum with Puerto Rico Status Act in the 2020s, and it passed the U.S. House in 2022, but not senate. In 2024, another non-binding referendum was included in the November 2024 ballot, the outcome was Statehood again being favored with about 58% of the vote.

The last State to join the Union was Hawaii, in 1959, although the last territory to formally join the United States was the Commonwealth of the Northern Mariana Islands in 1986. Puerto Rico is also a Commonwealth, the most popular option in 1960s, but it is still having referendums whereas Northern Marianas was not a part of the US, and had several referendums eventually choosing the US in the late 20th century.

== Table summary ==
The following table summarizes the results of Puerto Rico's political status referendums:

Results of Puerto Rico's status referendums
	1967	1993	1998	2012		2017	2020	2024
Independence	4,248 (0.6%)	75,620 (4.4%)	39,838 (2.54%)	NA	74,895 (5.5%)	7,981 (1.5%)	NA	125,171 (11.82%)
Free Association	NA	NA	4536 (0.29%)	NA	454,768 (33.2%)	7,981 (1.5%)	NA	313,259 (29.57%)
Commonwealth	425,132 (60.4%)	826,326 (48.6%)	993 (0.06%)	828,077 (46.0%)	NA	7,048 (1.3%)	NA	NA
Statehood	274,312 (39.0%)	788,296 (46.3%)	728,157 (46.49%)	NA	834,191 (61.3%)	508,862 (97.2%)	655,505 (52.52%)	620,782 (58.61%)
None of the above	NA	NA	787,900 (50.3%)	970,910 (54.0%)	NA	NA	592,671 (47.48%)	NA
Valid votes	703,692	1,690,242	1,561,424	1,798,987	1,363,854	523,891	1,248,176	1,059,212
Invalid/blank votes	3,601 (0.51%)	10,748 (0.63%)	4,846 (0.31%)	80,215 (4.27%)	515,348 (27.42%)	1,247 (0.24%)	40,959 (3.18%)	204,341 (19.29%)
Electoral turnout	707,293 66.27%	1,700,990 73.54%	1,566,270 71.26%	1,879,202; 78.20%		525,138 22.23%	1,289,135 54.72%	1,263,553 63.58%

The exact significance of referendum results is debated by local observers. The 1967 results showed strong support for maintaining the commonwealth, but this victory was followed by the first loss in twenty years of governorship by the Popular Democratic Party, the main supporter of the commonwealth association. This occurred in part because of bickering leadership. The 1993 results appear to protest the ideas or forum used to change status as imposed by the then-ruling Popular Democratic Party; the demands were controversial because there was no assurance, and great doubt, that they would be accepted by Congress. The 1998 results, where the PPD sponsored choice "none of the above" won, protested criteria set forth by the then ruling New Progressive Party.

=== 1967 referendum ===
In 1967, the Legislative Assembly tested the political interests of the Puerto Rican people by passing a local Plebiscite Act that allowed a vote on the status of Puerto Rico. This constituted the first referendum by the Legislature for a choice on three status options. At 60.4% percent of the vote, the commonwealth option won the majority vote. Following this referendum, efforts in the 1970s to enact legislation to address the status issue died in congressional committees.

The Partido Estadista Republicano boycotted the referendum leading to their decline in favor of the new PNP.

=== 1991 Constitutional Amendment referendum ===
The 1991 Referendum on the proposed "Claim to Democratic Rights" asked the voters to approve the addition of an amendment to the Puerto Rican constitution. The wording of this amendment would guarantee:

- The inalienable right to freely and democratically determine Puerto Rico's political status.
- The right to choose a dignified, non-colonial, non-territorial status not subordinate to plenary powers of Congress.
- The right to vote for three alternatives.
- The right that only results with a majority will be considered triumphant in a referendum.
- The right that any status would protect Puerto Rico's culture, language and identity, and continued independent participation in international sports events.
- The right that any status guarantees the individual's right to American citizenship.

Passage of this referendum would have constituted a claim for the government of Puerto Rico to establish these rights in the Commonwealth of Puerto Rico constitution and petition the President and Congress for these rights, but it was rejected by the people of Puerto Rico on a vote of 660,264 (53%) against to 559,259 (44.9%) in favor.

As per the Congressional Research Service report, despite PDP and PIP support, a majority (53%) voted against the proposal. Some contended that the decision to schedule the referendum represented an indirect step to block statehood. Others perceived the rejection to reflect dissatisfaction with the governor. Another explanation offered for the vote was that some cast their ballots out of fear that a “yes” vote would result in a further degradation of federal benefits and the loss of U.S. citizenship.

=== 1993 referendum ===
A subsequent referendum was organized by the Puerto Rican government in 1993 (in which the Congress played a more substantial role) where, at 48.6%, the commonwealth status won a plurality, though not a majority vote. The current political status (status quo) failed to receive the majority support it sought.

The U.S. Congress played a more substantial role in the 1993 referendum than it did in the 1967 referendum. In the 1992 election campaign, the PNP candidate for governor urged, and the legislature agreed, that a referendum on status be held “after the U.S. Congress failed to approve” status legislation. Since definitions on the ballot were formulated by the political parties themselves, neither Congress nor executive branch officials intervened to ensure that the alternatives presented to the voters would pass constitutional muster. The disconnect between the ballot option and constitutional requirements was summarized in the House report accompanying legislation introduced three years after the referendum, as follows:

The 1993 definition of “Commonwealth” failed to present the voters with status options consistent with full self-government, and it was misleading to propose to the voters an option which was unconstitutional and unacceptable to the Congress in almost every respect. No option on the ballot in 1993 received a majority of votes. Some contend that statehood may have suffered the greatest loss, considering the governor and the legislature were members of the PNP, and the referendum itself was a major campaign promise for the governor. Others may argue that PDP advocates did not achieve a final victory in the 1993 vote because Congress rejected the commonwealth option presented on ballots. In the end, Commonwealth status was again upheld in the 1993 referendum.

=== 1998 referendum ===
In the December 13, 1998 referendum, the current status quo (Commonwealth status) received less than one tenth of one percent (0.06%) of the total vote. The majority vote went to a "none of the above" option which received 50.3%. This was followed by the statehood option which received 46.7%. The option of independence received 2.5% of the vote.

=== 2012 referendum ===
On November 6, 2012, a fourth status referendums took place which consisted of two questions. The first question asked voters whether they wanted to maintain the existing commonwealth status under the territorial clause of the U.S. Constitution or whether they preferred a nonterritorial option. The second question asked voters which would be the preferred alternative if a non-territorial option was wanted and gave voters the choice between three non-territorial alternatives: statehood, independence, or free association.

Ten days after the 2012 referendum, on November 16, 2012, the Electoral Commission reported that 54 percent voted "no" on preserving Puerto Rico's territorial status, the first part of the referendum. On the second part, where voters were asked to choose between statehood, independence and free association, 61.2 percent chose statehood, while 33.3 preferred free association and 5.5 percent voted for independence. However, these results have been challenged by observers who note that nearly 500,000 blank ballots were ignored in the reporting by the pro-statehood PNP, contrary to previous Puerto Rico court rulings of Sánchez y Colón v. ELA, 134 DPR 445 (1993); and 134 DPR 503 (1993) and Suárez Cáceres v. CEE, 176 DPR 31 (2009), both of which affirmed that blank ballots should be considered as "none of the above" when that option was not offered on the ballot. Following these judicial precedents the results would reflect that statehood was favored by 44.4% of the ballots cast, while 55.6% were opposed. On December 11, 2012, the pro-statehood 16th Legislative Assembly of Puerto Rico passed a concurrent resolution "[t]o request the President and the Congress of the United States to ... begin the process to admit Puerto Rico to the Union as a State."

President Obama pledged to respect the will of the people of Puerto Rico "if there was a clear majority." A December 2012 statement clarifying the Obama administration's position on the status referendum results stated, "the people of Puerto Rico want the issue of status resolved, and a majority chose statehood." A previous White House statement had said, "Now is the time for Congress to act and the administration will work with them [with Congress] on that effort so that the people of Puerto Rico can determine their own future." On April 10, 2013, President Obama moved on his promise to respect the will of the people of Puerto Rico in his Fiscal Year 2014 Budget proposal to Congress, asking for "$2.5 million for the Puerto Rico Elections Commission to be used for voter education and the plebiscite."

On May 14, 2013, the heavily pro-Commonwealth 17th Legislative Assembly of Puerto Rico approved a concurrent resolution that stated, in part, "On November 6, 2012, a plesbicite took place in Puerto Rico concurrent with the general elections whose results were inconclusive since none of the options garnished a majority of votes." On the next day, May 15, 2013, the pro-statehood Representative Pedro Pierluisi introduced the Puerto Rico Status Resolution Act to the House of Representatives asking Congress to admit Puerto Rico as the 51st State.

=== 2017 referendum ===
The previous referendums provided voters with three options: statehood, free association, and independence. The 2017 Puerto Rican status referendum offered only two options: Statehood and Independence/Free Association. A majority vote for the latter would have resulted in a second vote to determine the preference: full independence as a nation or associated free state status with independence but with a "free and voluntary political association" between Puerto Rico and the United States. The specifics of the association agreement would be detailed in the Compact of Free Association that would be negotiated between the U.S. and Puerto Rico. That document might cover topics such as the role of the US military in Puerto Rico, the use of the US currency, free trade between the two entities, and whether Puerto Ricans would be U.S. citizens.

Governor Ricardo Rosselló is strongly in favor of statehood to help develop the economy and help to "solve our 500-year-old colonial dilemma ... Colonialism is not an option .... It’s a civil rights issue ... 3.5 million citizens seeking an absolute democracy," he told the news media. Benefits of statehood include an additional $10 billion per year in federal funds, the right to vote in presidential elections, higher Social Security and Medicare benefits, and a right for its government agencies and municipalities to file for bankruptcy. The latter is currently prohibited.

Statehood might be useful as a means of dealing with the financial crisis, since it would allow for bankruptcy and the relevant protection. According to the Government Development Bank, this might be the only solution to the debt crisis. Congress has the power to vote to allow Chapter 9 protection without the need for statehood, but in late 2015 there was very little support in the House for this concept.

At approximately the same time as the referendum, Puerto Rico's legislators were also expected to vote on a bill that would allow the Governor to draft a state constitution and hold elections to choose senators and representatives to the federal Congress. Statehood won with 97% of the vote, but the referendum only had a 22.93% turnout as opponents boycotted the vote. No further action was taken.

=== 2020 referendum ===
Results of the 2020 status referendum by municipality

For the first time, a non-binding straight yes-or-no referendum vote was held on statehood on November 3, 2020.

Based on the completed certified election night count, the option to pursue statehood won the referendum 52.52%–47.48%.

=== 2024 referendum ===
In July 2024, Governor Pedro Pierluisi called a referendum on the status of Puerto Rico in November 2024, and for the first time the island's current status as a U.S. territory will not be an option during the non-binding referendum. The executive order follows the U.S. House of Representatives' 2022 approval of a bill to help Puerto Rico move toward a change in territorial status. Voters were given the choice of statehood, independence, or independence with free association, the terms of which would be negotiated regarding foreign affairs, U.S. citizenship, and use of the U.S. dollar. Popular Democratic Party called for a blank vote for not including Commonwealth or the current system.

The result of the referendum was 58.61% in favour of statehood.

== Congressionally mandated referendum ==
No congressionally mandated referendum has ever been held, and average voter turnout in the locally enacted status votes has been about 10% lower than in general elections. However, various bills have been introduced in Congress to effect a referendum backed by Congress and to which Congress would be committed.

== See also ==
- Puerto Rico Democracy Act of 2007 (H.R. 900 & S. 1936)
- Puerto Rican citizenship
- Voting rights in Puerto Rico
- Politics of Puerto Rico
- 51st state
- Sovereigntism (Puerto Rico)
- Special Committee on Decolonization
- United Nations list of non-self-governing territories
- Proposed political status for Puerto Rico
- Statehood movement in Puerto Rico
- Privileges and Immunities Clause
- Territories of the United States
- United States territorial court
- Federal tribunals in the United States
