= Sovereigntism (Puerto Rico) =

Movement to achieve sovereignty

Soberanismo libreasociacionista
- The logo used by the PPD members affiliated to the free association movement
- Formation: 1961 (in its current form); 1998 (as an official vote option)
- Type: Multi-Partisan non-governmental movement
- Legal status: Political advocacy group
- Purpose: Sovereign Free Association
- Leader: Several
- Website: ELAQueTodosQueremos.com
- Remarks: Originated from initiatives dating back to the 1800s.

The free association movement in Puerto Rico refers to initiatives throughout the history of Puerto Rico aimed at changing the current political status of Puerto Rico to that of a sovereign freely associated state with the United States. Locally, the term soberanista ("sovereignty supporter") refers to someone that seeks to redefine the relationship between Puerto Rico and the United States to that of a compact with full sovereignty. The term is mostly used in reference to those that support a compact of free association or a variation of this formula, commonly known as Estado Libre Asociado (ELA) Soberano ("Sovereign Associated Free State" or "Free Associated State"), between Puerto Rico and the United States. Members of the independence movement that are willing to pursue alliances with this ideology are occasionally referred to as such, but are mostly known as independentistas ("independence supporters"). Consequently, soberanismo (English: "sovereigntism") then became the local name for the free association movement.

Early proposals pursuing an unrefined form of sovereign association emerged during the 1880s and 1920s, but failed to gain an immediate foothold. The current territorial Commonwealth status is the consequence of its architect's inability to implement his original vision. When first proposed by Resident Commissioner Antonio Fernós-Isern, the concept was akin to a form of sovereign free association such as the one found in the Commonwealth realms. In 1950, Fernós used his function as Resident Commissioner to influence a process held between March 30 and July 3, that ended with the approval of Public Law 600, which allowed Puerto Rico to draft its own Constitution and adopt a new political system. He expected that by adopting this law, the control that the United States retained would only be considered a form of trusteeship, with sovereignty being partially split between both sides due to voluntary relegation, in line with the United Nations Trusteeship Council. At the moment Fernós expected that the territorial clause would not apply after reclaiming sovereignty, due to the fact that the United States never incorporated Puerto Rico. During the original negotiation process in Congress, Fernós was aware that several key elements of his project were being removed, but opted to focus on its initial approval, believing that he would not be able to accomplish everything at once. Under these arguments, the adoption of Law 600 was approved on June 5, 1951. The name of Estado Libre Asociado (lit. "Associated Free State") was adopted as the official Spanish name, while the official English name avoided naming any form of association or freedom, simply being called "Commonwealth".

Unsatisfied with the model approved, Fernós spent the following years attempting to "perfect" the Commonwealth to reflect the eponymous model in which it was based. The first project towards that goal was presented in 1953 and pursued the derogation of Puerto Rico's status as a United States possession. Despite receiving support from the United States Department of the Interior, at the moment directly in charge of territorial affairs, and the Congressional commissions that studied it, Luis Muñoz Marín ordered its retirement. This decision was later blamed on the armed forces of the United States, who opposed any decision that would endanger their complete control of the strategic territory of Puerto Rico during the height of the Cold War. Subsequent projects focused on the pursuit of sovereignty, including the Aspinall Project, which was consistent with free association as defined in UN General Assembly Resolution 1514, but failed to advance in Congress for similar reasons.

During the late 1980s, PR Sen. Marco Rigau presented a free association project that received the rejection of conservative governor Rafael Hernández Colón, establishing the sides that would permeate the internal debate of the Popular Democratic Party (PPD) during the following decades. The option made its debut backed by an independent group in the inconclusive 1998 status referendum, where none of the actual status options won. The 2000s brought forth a re-emergence of the free association movement with the prominence of new leaders such as mayors William Miranda Marín, José Aponte de la Torre and Rafael Cordero Santiago. In 2008, the ELA Soberano was adopted as the PPD's institutional position by governor Aníbal Acevedo Vilá, a transcendental move for the movement that resounded beyond the re-election campaign. Despite being inherited by two conservative leaders, the soberanistas have continued to gain a stronghold within the PPD, seizing prominent positions including the mayorship of the Puerto Rican capital of San Juan. The exposition also led to the creation of other movements that supported the ideal, such as Alianza pro Libre Asociación Soberana (ALAS) and Movimiento Unión Soberanista (MUS). As of the Puerto Rican status referendum, 2012, sovereign free association is the option with the largest growth margin among all, experiencing a hundredfold (4,536 to 454,768) expansion in only 14 years.

== Historical progression ==
=== Early proposals of sovereign association as a "third option" ===
Due to Puerto Rico's historical status debate, proposals consistent with the modern free association movement can be traced to the times when Puerto Rico was a colony of the Spanish Empire. In March 1887, Román Baldorioty de Castro presented a proposal based on the British North America Act 1867, the accord that ended the United Kingdom's colonial rule over Canada and allowed it to become a sovereign Dominion, during the inaugural convention of the Autonomist Party. However, there this effort was thwarted by the conservative members of the party, who supported a project that would turn the remaining Spanish colonies into autonomous provinces. Ever the diplomat, Baldorioty supported the posture of the mayority, ending the first attempt to create a form of sovereign association for Puerto Rico. This was followed by the Spanish–American War, which concluded with Spain surrendering the sovereignty of its colonies to the United States. The first proposal of an "Associated Free State of Porto Rico" under this regime emerged in 1922 from Union of Puerto Rico, then led by Antonio R. Barceló. Its creator was a lawyer named Miguel Guerra Mondragón, who based his proposal in the recognition of the sovereignty of separate constituent countries seen during the creation of the current model of the United Kingdom.

This initial version was ignored by the House of Representatives, despite being officially presented by Democratic congressman Phillip Campbell. Afterwards, a modified version was created by Epifanio Fernández Vanga, who described it as a "status where the people, being free, elected to associate with other people to establish a democratic base which due to mutual consent included tight economic and economic ties". This definition was officially adopted in the Union's platform. However, during the following years the discussion of the status issue stagnated, instead replaced with the serious economic concerns brought forth by the Great Depression. The Union lost its name and insignia after dissolving an alliance with the Republican Party, instead being reorganized into the new Liberal Party of Puerto Rico. This party proposed a two-step solution to the status issue, first obtaining a form of economic sovereignty and later proclaiming independence. Luis Muñoz Marín was part of the group that idealized this model. However, pressured by the economic influence of the sugar industry, the status discussion was stalled. This was exacerbated by serious differences between Barceló and Muñoz.

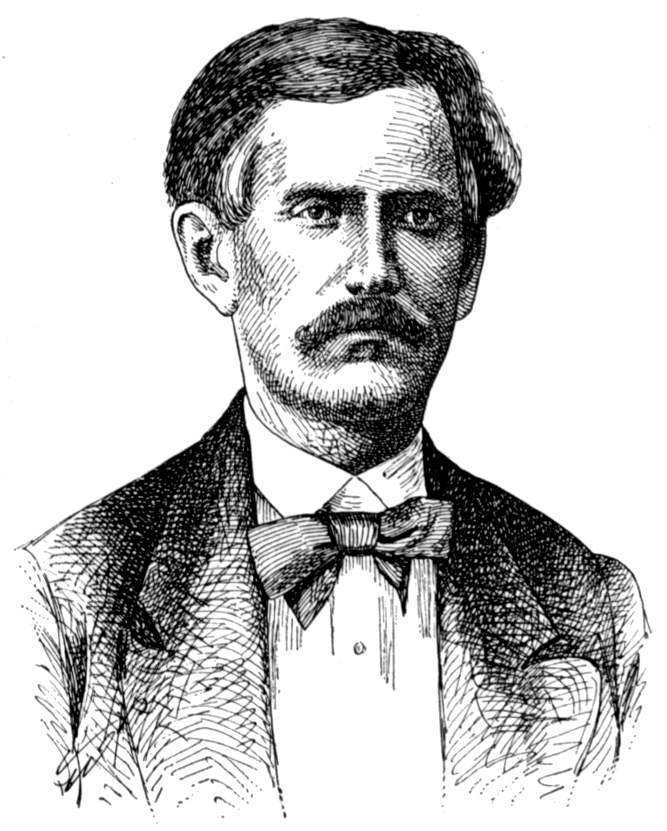
Román Baldorioty de Castro

The pursue of sovereignty within the Popular Democratic Party (Puerto Rico) (PPD) can be traced to the moment of its foundation.

=== Initial PPD proposals; other groups ===
The ongoing controversy over the nature of the Commonwealth and the status of its sovereignty led to the creation of groups that competed with the established parties, such as Directorio Soberanista (lit. "Pro-Sovereignty Directory"), which promoted free association, but the existence of these was brief. On November 19, 1970, the Central Council of the PPD issued what became known as the Pronunciamiento de Aguas Buenas (lit. "Aguas Buenas Pronnouncement"), which stated its support for a "complete self-government, founded in the free association with the United States and which permits and supports the country's cultural personality and the sustained development of its social and material progress."

However throughout the 1970s, conservative PPD president Hernández Colón argued that the Commonwealth already represented a form of association and the issue stagnated. Despite this, a number of unsuccessful initiatives emerged within the PPD, arguing for a form of association where the sovereignty of was directly included in the negotiation between both parties. In 1976, PROELA became the first free association organization affiliated to the PPD. The latter years of this decade brought forth a resolution where the UN's Decolonization Committee weighted on the possibility of Puerto Rico becoming an associated free state, which concluded that it was a viable option. Despite this, the topic remained unattended within the PPD while the pro-statehood PNP began a preemptive campaign where it likened free association to independence and the Soviet Union.

Rafael Cordero Santiago's grave

During the 1980s, the Bar Association of Puerto Rico determined that pre-existing compacts of association could be modified to fit the local needs. Within the PPD, senator Marco Antonio Rigau officially presented a free association proposal to the PPD's Government Board (Spanish: Junta de Gobierno), but (now governor) Hernández Colón dismissed the idea as one that contradicted the postures of his administration and stated that free association was only supported by a few "liberal quills" within the PPD and presented his own initiative excluding sovereignty as an element. Despite representing one of the earliest confrontations between the factions of the party and that the conservatives held most positions of influence, the ongoing faction skirmishes concluded with a new definition of "Commonwealth" being adopted by the General Council due to the initiative of liberal Carlos Vizcarrondo, stating that any future development would be "non colonial and non territorial".

The 1990s began with Victoria Muñoz Mendoza adopting her predecessor's conservative postures in her attempt to become governor. After this failed, the party was involved in a status referendum promoted by the PNP, administration of Pedro Rosselló where Ponce mayor Rafael Cordero Santiago mediated a timid support for sovereignty in the definition of "Commonwealth" present in the ballot. In 1997, following the failed campaign of conservative Héctor Luis Acevedo for the governorship, representative Aníbal Acevedo Vilá became the president of the PPD. Under his presidency, a Status Commission led to the Caguas mayor William Miranda Marín and senator José Ortiz Dalliot, both liberals, to determine that there was an ideological disparity between the conservative message of past PPD presidents and the party's base. While Acevedo Vilá and other factions argued for a non territorial development to the Commonwealth, when US Rep. Don Young introduced United States-Puerto Rico Political Status Act in 1997 the party was divided on its language and the proposed format, eventually leaving PROELA as the only faction that supported it. The following year, the party resumed their argument for a "non territorial and non colonial" development of the Commonwealth that allowed Puerto Rico to freely commerce with other countries and join international organization while retaining the United States Citizenship.

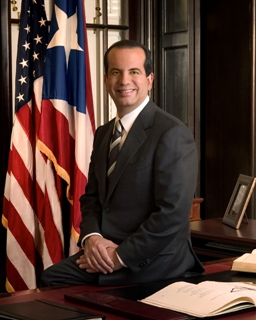
Aníbal Acevedo Vilá

Sovereignty was subsequently approved by the PPD's Government Board as an institutional position, with the support of Cordero, Miranda and Carolina mayor José Aponte de la Torre. However, the same group opted not to test this new definition in the second status referendum organized by the Rosselló administration and instead opted to unify both of the party's faction in a vote for a "None of the above" option, while other a group of young PPD activists took the initiative to support the free association option, which, despite receiving only 4,536 votes, fared well against the "territorial Commonwealth's" 993. Prior to this, Ortiz Guzmán attempted to contest the definition of the "free association" option, but was unable to derail the process.

=== Acevedo Vilá, Miranda Marín and the ELA Soberano ===
Despite conservative Sila Calderón becoming the PPD's candidate for governor, a moderate support for sovereignty was included in the party's platform prior to the 2000 general elections, and Acevedo Vilá was elected as candidate for Resident Commissioner over Hernández Colón's son, José Alfredo Hernández Mayoral. The PPD won both positions in the general elections. Both branches of the legislature were controlled by liberals, with Antonio Fas Alzamora becoming the PR Senate's president and Vizcarrondo the PR House of Representatives' speaker. However, Calderón avoided the status issue throughout her term, leading to her expressions contrasting against those of liberal figures such as Cordero Santiago, Miranda Marín and Acevedo Vilá himself, while figures that formerly supported (including some that helped establish it) the territorial Commonwealth such as José Trias Monge began expressing a support for the pursue of sovereignty.

Acevedo Vilá became the PPD's governor candidate for the 2004 general elections, where he defeated Roselló but was only able to secure a shared governance when conservative Roberto Pratts lost the party's bid for resident commissioner. During the process, he promoted the organization of a Constituent Assembly, eventually presenting a project that was abandoned as part of an ongoing power struggle between the PPD and PNP. In 2005, George W. Bush's administration released a task force report in December 2005, which was met with opposition by both factions of the PPD since it concluded that Congress held all sovereignty over Puerto Rico but also described free association as akin to independence. Following the intervention of figures such as Aponte, the party expressed its support for a form of association that included sovereignty, but during the following years status initiatives were sparse beyond declarations made before the United Nations' Decolonization Committee or the support expressed by the PPD's General Assembly for the organization of a Constituent Assembly.

On April 27, 2008, Acevedo Vilá argued for the sovereign development of the commonwealth and began an internal process to define a form of sovereign association for the party to defend, which was prepared by a commission formed by members of both factions (legislators Luis Vega Ramos and Fas Alzamora and Hector Ferrer and non-elected figures such as Hernández Mayoral, among others) and moderated by Miranda Marín, eventually leading to the adoption of the concept of a ELA Soberano (interchangeably known as either "Sovereign Associated Free State" or "Sovereign Commonwealth" in English), which included features of both free association and the commonwealth. However, Acevedo Vilá lost the bid for re-election while facing a federal indictment and Ferrer took over as president of the PPD, resuming the conservative postures of previous presidents.

This marked the return of Hernández Colón as the party's main ideologue and the most influential member of the Government Board leading to a number of conservatives being named to fill most of the party's roles, including the certification of Hernández Mayoral as Secretary of International and Federal Affairs, a move that led to internal conflict that was protested by liberals, who eventually decided to leave their seats in protest. A group of functionaries mentored by the former governor began a public campaign against the pro-sovereignty postures of the previous administration, being led by senator Alejandro García Padilla, Roberto Pratts and a now-conservative Jorge Colberg Toro. This move was sorely received by the liberal faction, which noted that representatives Carmen Yulín Cruz, Charlie Hernández, Luis Vega Ramos and Luis Raúl Torres, as well as senators Antonio Fas Alzamora and Cirilo Tirado were directly elected, while conservatives such as Colberg Toro entered as a product of the Minority Law. (Note: This law grants additional representation to electoral minorities if a majority party wins more than two thirds of the seats in the legislature.) Within the PPD this conflict was met with a variety of reactions, most notably the forma division of estadolibrismo in two well-defined factions, soberanistas that support sovereignty and autonomistas that support more autonomy inside the territorial clause. Led by an increasingly vocal Miranda Marín, soberanistas gained a foothold in the Mayor's Association. Hernández Mayoral emerged as the conservative's public speaker, to the point of promoting that the soberanistas were expelled from the party.

The PNP-led Luis Fortuño administration began pursuing another status referendum through Pedro Pierluisi's H.R. 2499 (known as the Puerto Rico Democracy Act). This move ignited these differences and Ferrer reacted by reaching an agreement with Miranda Marín to keep the discussion contained in an internal committee, but this failed when its appointed chairman, Colberg, resigned and joined Hernández Mayoral and García Padilla in a public critic of the soberanistas, with the party's president eventually siding with the conservatives.

Outside the party, the PPD's conservative postures led to the inclusion of groups such as the Alianza Pro-Libre Asociación Soberana (ALAS), Asociación de Estudiantes Puertorriqueños por un ELA Soberano and the Instituto Soberanista Puertorriqueño/Movimiento Unión Soberanista (MUS) in the media, the first two supporting free association while the third supported sovereignty as a concept. Among these, Proyecto de Alianza e Impacto Soberanista (Pais) featured the direct participation of Miranda Marín.

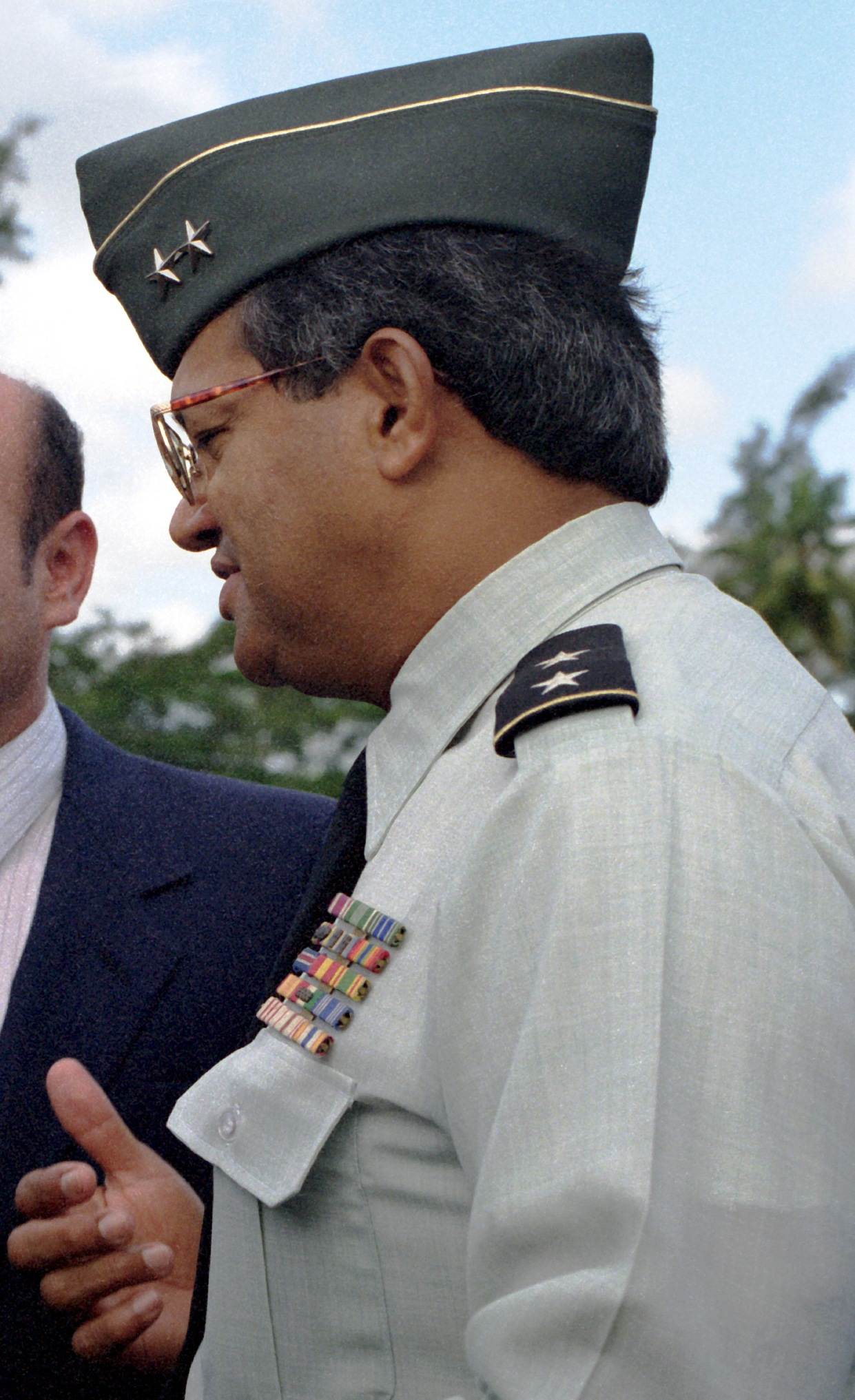
William Miranda Marín

Fortuño quickly exploited these conflicts, intervening and telling the PPD to define itself, and also claiming that the definition of "Sovereignty in association with the United States" present in H.R. 2499 was taken from the 2008 Program of Government. However, Acevedo Vilá contested this assertion, citing that it was a PNP artifact and reaffirming his own compromise with a PPD-defined sovereign status with the support of the soberanistas.

Ferrer continued denying any support for free association, instead adopting a proposal to pursue a "fourth option" beyond the three stated in international laws (citing a sentence of General Assembly Resolution 2625 that allows for "other arrangements" between nations) in an attempt to reach a consensus. However, Alfredo Hernández Mayoral was the first to dismiss the possibility that this meant a definitive ceasefire and published an opinion column criticizing the soberanistas, which prompted a rebuttal by Vega Ramos. Ferrer presented this concept before the UN's decolonization committee and rejected free association before Congress, whereas the soberanistas and PROELA defended sovereignty.

Several conservative members publicly differed on how to proceed on the status issue. Ferrer responded by proposing a "New Social Pact" that would work to unify both factions in theory, but several members of the party were cautious and the conflict resumed with another piece published by Hernández Mayoral that received support by Sila Mari González and García Padilla. After responses by Vega Ramos and Charlie Hernández, Acevedo Vilá took responsibility for the loss and dismissed the conservative argument, while Miranda Marín directly questioned the honesty of the premise. While the latter began sounding as a potential governor candidate, the conservative wing responded by promoting the final draft of Colberg Toro's document for a territorial development.

On October 8, 2009, the US. House Committee on Natural Resources published House Report 111-294, which directly dismissed the possibility of further developing the Commonwealth under the sovereignty of Congress. The document criticized the support given by the conservative wing of the PPD to an enhanced territorial commonwealth, stating that "this hybrid proposal continues to be promoted in Puerto Rico as a feasible status option. Such proposals have resulted in misinformed and inconclusive referendums in Puerto Rico in July 1967, November 1993 and December 1998." The status issue then took a hiatus while the party opposed H.R. 2499 in Washington, while the soberanistas were faced with the difficulties of Miranda Marín being diagnosed with pancreatic cancer.

=== Pacto de Asociación, 2012 referendum and David Bernier ===
At the urging of Hernández Mayoral, Ferrer converted a proposal by Colberg into Government Board Resolution JG-2010-003, which directly rejected free association as an option. After passing on a divided vote, the document was globally panned by soberanistas, who argued that if the liberal wing is excluded that would mean a guaranteed loss for the PPD and questioned its viability without the approval of the General Council. Hernández Mayoral expresses satisfaction and invited them to leave the party, while the conservative wing justified the move as one that anticipated a future referendum.

The soberanistas appealed to the party's base via a petition. Acevedo Vilá and Ferrer continued an argument that extended to the other sectors of the party. More formal rebuttals included a request to overturn the Resolution by the interim-president of the Mayor's Association, Josian Santiago, and the presentation of a free association proposal by senator Fas Alzamora and lawyer Ramón Luis Nieves, which was openly supported by the soberanistas but only met a lukewarm reception by Ferrer and criticized by other conservatives.

While the ideological struggle continued within the PPD, ALAS formally requested to act as the representative of free association in the referendum. In the midst of this controversy, Miranda Marín issued a pro-sovereignty speech that gathered the support of soberanistas within the party and of ALAS and Ponce's Movimiento Autónomo Ponceño. However, Ferrer openly disagreed, leading to a fruitless reunion between both.

Meanwhile, the Obama administration organized a Task Force to deal with the status issue, and Ferrer named Hernández Mayoral as the official representative of the PPD, while free association was defended by PROELA. During the public hearings for H.R. 2499, a group of lobbyists led by Ferrer managed to convince US Rep. Virginia Foxx to present an amendment that would include the territorial Commonwealth (described as "status quo") in the project, essentially neutralizing its intention to pursue "non territorial options". The subsequent approval of this amended proposal in the US House of Representatives was not supported by the soberanistas of the PPD. ALAS also criticized it as an "attempt to prolong the anguish of the colony represented by the current Commonwealth". As the project moved to the Senate, the PPDCsoberanistas insisted on a Constituent Assembly, while ALAS endorsed it. On June 4, 2010, Miranda Marín died from complications of cancer, with conservative José Varela presenting an aborted candidature before the Municipal Committee, being revoked and later defeated by the former mayor's son in an ideological campaign.

After Ferrer announced the eventual organization of an "Internal Constituent Assembly" to refine the party's status ideology, the soberanistas criticized that the Pacto de futuro was being pushed to become the official posture, since according to them "it [was not] even a pact per se", but a "manual that failed to establish specific details". PROELA and ALAS supported these arguments. However, Colberg and Hernández Mayoral argued against sovereignty in response. This conflict eventually led to the creation of a Status Commission by the PPD's Government Board. On November 9, 2010, the MUS applied to be recognized as a political party for the 2012 general elections, but were met with opposition from conservatives within the PPD.

Ferrer inherited the position of PPD president to fellow conservative Alejandro García Padilla, who on March 6, 2011, announced his intention to run as candidate for the office of governor. The soberanistas took a cautious approach to this candidature, since the new candidate noting that the status issue was not an immediate priority, but middle ground was reached with a Constituent Assembly proposal.

On March 16, 2011, the President's Task Force released their report, joining the others in stating that Puerto Rico remains under the Territory Clause of the U.S. Constitution and that any attempt to pursue an enhanced Commonwealth within the Territorial Clause would be "constitutionally problematic" and not permanent, but mechanism proposed by the document was not supported by the sovereigntists, who felt that it placed the options in arbitrary classifications and kept the territorial Commonwealth as a viable option.

In April 2011, the PPD's Status Commission released a report that included "10 principles of association" for the non-territorial development of the Commonwealth, a dissection of both the Pacto de Asociacion and the Pacto de futuro, a study of the President's Task Force report and a recommendation to establish a permanent Status Commission. However, the document did not gather the support of the new candidate and was not acted upon. On October 26, 2011, noted liberal Rafael Cox Alomar was announced as the candidate for the office of Resident Commissioner, but he adopted a more conservative discourse during the political campaign. In 2011, the conservative wing launched an aggressive campaign among the PPD's base to ensure that the soberanistas failed to be elected in to the party's Government Board centering it around both of Hernández Colón's sons, but this move failed and all but one of the liberal candidates were elected.

On October 4, 2011, Fortuño announced that his administration would hold a local status referendum after H.R. 2499 failed to advance in the US Senate. In the project proposed and later approved, voters were going to be asked two questions: (1) whether they agreed to continue with Puerto Rico's territorial status and -if not- (2) to indicate the political status they preferred from three possibilities: "Statehood", "Independence" or a "Sovereign Associated Free State". The referendum was set for November 6, 2012, the same day of the general elections. In February 2012, the government board led by García Padilla announced the strategy of the conservative leadership to participate in the referendum, to vote "Yes" to continuing under the territorial clause and to not vote for any of the non-territorial options listed in the second question. However, the soberanistas countered by openly promoting a vote for the "Sovereign Free Association" option, while adhering to the leadership's mandate to vote "Yes" in the first question. However, García Padilla temporarily suspended Rep. Charlie Hernández when he announced that he would also vote for the "No" option.

In the midst of this ideological confrontation, members of the free association movement topped the vote to select the party's PR House of Representative at-large candidates at the 2012 PPD's primary. Despite winning a spot in this event, Carmen Yulín opted to run for the mayorship of San Juan after then-candidate Ferrer was involved in a scandal.

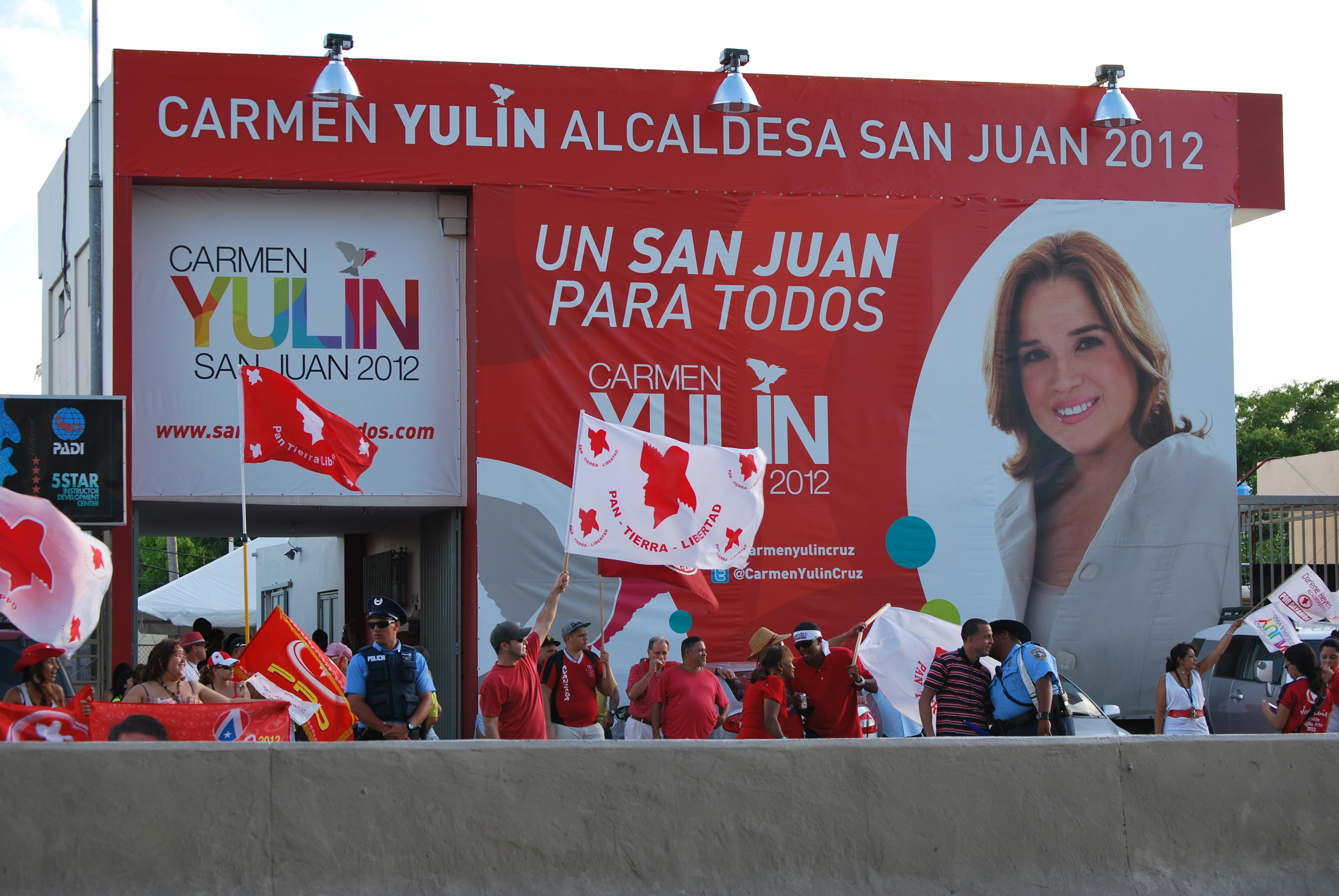
Carmen Yulín's 2012 campaign headquarters.

In April 2012, ALAS presented the signatures required to become the official representative of "Sovereign Associated Free State" in the referendum and co-representative of the "No" option. Within the PPD, Acevedo Vilá emerged as the leader of the faction that supported the Sovereign Associated Free State, while two additional groups, Populares Pro ELA soberano (lit. "PPD affiliates pro-Sovereign Associated Free State") and Amigos del ELA Soberano (lit. "Friends of the Sovereign Associated Free State"), joined ALAS. The MUS formed alliance with sovereignts candidates of the PPD, but did not take an official stance of the referendum.

At the 2012 General Elections García Padilla became governor while the majority of soberanistas were re-elected as mayors and additional sympathizers joined the incumbents in the legislature. Carmen Yulín scored what was described as the "upset of the elections", defeating Jorge Santini to become mayor of San Juan. The "Sovereign Free Association" option finished second in the status referendum by gathering 33.34% (449,679) of the valid votes. However, the other half of the PPD affiliates followed the strategy supported by Garcia Padilla, leading to 480,918 blank votes. The "No" (to continuing under the Territorial Clause) option defeated the "Yes" option 54% to 46%.

García Padilla then named Juan Eugenio Hernández Mayoral to direct the Puerto Rico Federal Affairs Administration (PRFAA) and had previously retained his brother in the position of Secretary of International and Federal Affairs, preserving Hernández Colón's conservative stance during his administration. On January 2, 2013, Luis Vega Ramos presented P.C. 210, a bill supporting the organization of the Constituent Assembly, on behalf of the Bar Association of Puerto Rico. However, after the Obama administration presented a budget including 2.5 million to cost the education campaign of a future status process, García Padilla reaffirmed his support for the territorial Commonwealth and discarded the Constituent Assembly supported by the soberanistas. After opposing further proposals for a Constituent Assembly, García Padilla went on to state that no further actions to attend the status issue would take place in 2013, disregarding another initiative to discuss a Constituent Assembly in the legislature.

On July 1, 2013, conservative Eduardo Ferrer relinquished his position of Representative at-large for the PPD, formally opening a vacancy at the PR House for the PPD. The party announced that the position would be filled with the vote of the General Council's delegates during a special election. Only five candidates made the cut to be on the final ballot, Claribel Martínez Marmolejos, Yasmín Mejías, Carlos Rechani, Darlene Reyes and Manuel Natal Albelo. Of them, only Natal was openly soberanista and his bid was considered difficult, since it placed him in direct conflict with the conservative leadership, but he was elected despite another ideological clash that featured García Padilla quoting Hernández Colón's assertion that the soberanistas were nothing but a "few quills".

In 2014, Socialist International President George Papandreou appeared before the United Nations Special Committee on Decolonization to support the resolution on the status of Puerto Rico, and the Socialist Party adopted a resolution at a conference in Mexico City.

At the PPD Convention, the soberanistas reunited with García Padilla in private to discuss the Constituent Assembly resolution. After a period of negotiations that lasted over ten hours, the group led by Tirado allowed the proposal presented the next day to be discussed without directly referencing that the option presented by the PPD had to be "non colonial [and] non territorial". The PIP and Bar Association of Puerto Rico presented their own Constituent Assembly proposal and public hearings were scheduled.

However, the approval of 2.5 million for a referendum overseen by the US Department of Justice in the Obama administration's budget led to a pause in actions. Despite the development, the soberanistas felt that a Constituent Assembly should take place first, serving as the negotiation table between Puerto Rico, the US Department of Justice and Congress, with the viable options that emerged from this collaboration being voted for in a referendum. The onset of the Puerto Rican government-debt crisis pushed the status issue to a secondary role and after several months of inactivity, García Padilla revived the Joint Commission. Leading to the PPD's convention during the summer, the ideological schism resurfaced, with conservatives supporting a referendum as proposed by the Obama administration while the sovereigntists continued arguing for a Constituent Assembly. García Padilla pursued the first option and avoided defining the basics of the status option that was being proposed, instead proposing a "permanent discussion" on the matter.

On August 30, 2014, the status issue was delegated to a committee of four ex-PPD presidents, Acevedo Vilá, Hernández Colón, Miguel Hernández Agosto and Héctor Luis Acevedo, which were supposed to reach a consensus. The Committee was unable to do so and García Padilla did not intervene, leading to its eventual dissolution when Hernández Agosto was excused due to illness and Acevedo Vilá left when it was nearing a year of existence. Without a definition for the status formula to be defended in a referendum, the status issue stagnated during the following months, with the party seeking the counsel of constitutional lawyer Samuel Issacharoff by requesting his opinion on the viability of several proposals of both sovereign and territorial development. However, his reply was not made public and no further status initiatives were undertaken before García Padilla renounced his bid for re-election on December 14, 2015.

Former Secretary of State David Bernier became the next president of the PPD and in his first message as candidate for Governor expressed that despite working towards a consensus, he personally believes in a "non colonial, non territorial" formula and favors a Constituent Assembly, also listing the status issue second among his priorities. The following day, this ideological shift resulted in Hernández Mayoral quitting his office as Secretary of Federal Affairs. In the first Board reunion presided by Bernier, members of both factions decided to wait for the resolution of Puerto Rico v. Sanchez Valle, a case active in the Supreme Court of the United States that could potentially rule that Puerto Rico does not currently possess any degree of sovereignty, before choosing which mechanism should be used.

== Other movements and activism ==
From his position of Law Professor Antonio Fernós López-Cepero Jr. followed in the footsteps of his father, making his own proposals for a free association compact, among which was the elimination of the "colonial position" once occupied by his father, the Resident Commissioner. His defense of free association and constant critics to the conservative interpretation of his father's work by figures such as Rafael Hernández Colón, earned him the tongue-in-cheek nickname "high priest of soberanismo" from José Alfredo Hernández Mayoral. Among the independent voices that proposed a concept of free association was, Enrique Vázquez Quintana, who argued in his proposal that a concept based on the legendary round table should be established, with representation from the governments of Puerto Rico and the United States as well as a single representative from the United Nations. In 1997, noting the perception that the status debate was not advancing within the PPD, he proposed the creation of a new party, Partido por la Libre Asociación (lit. "Party for Free Association"), to directly promote free association. The initiative turned into the Partido Acción Civil (lit. "Civil Action Party"), which dropped the status from its platform, aborting the initiative. Ricardo Alegría, a fervent supporter of independence and culture, noted that he would be willing to temporarily support free association in this meant abolishing the territorial clause. Juan Mari Brás, expressed a similar position, claiming that while it is not independence, free association is flexible and "is not a one way street like statehood". In 2002, Julio Muriente of the Movimiento Independentista Nacional Hostosiano (MINH) a moderate pro-independence group, argued that if the free association movement gained prominence within the PPD, it was only a matter of time until the inmovilism surrounding the status debate was vanquished.

Historian Ángel Collado Schwarz also created a radio show, where he discussed several historical events and topics, often discussing their relation to the status issue and sovereignty. The artistic class instead opted to support free association in their own medium, without directly entering the political arena. The most notable example was actor Víctor Alicea whose character, Epifanio González Villamil, had become an unofficial mascot to the PPD throughout the years. In 2009, after portraying the character as a fanatical follower of the PPD without taking a stance in the ideological struggle for more than two decades, Epifanio declared himself a soberanista. Alicea then began citing Miranda Marín, Cordero and Aponte as examples for the current leaders to follow. This move was made official with a "welcome card" issued by Carmen Yulín Cruz, Luis Vega Ramos and Charlie Hernández. The character also ran a tongue-in-cheek gubernatorial primary campaign within the PPD. He adopted the slogan Soberano y bonitillo pa' sacar a to' esos pillos (lit. "Sovereign(sic) and good lookin' to kick out all those thieves"), which he employed in a faux campaign. Non partisan demonstrations include that of Miguel Rodríguez, who on February 2, 2014, began an impromptu manifestation in front of La Fortaleza in support of free association, returning to the original vision of the PPD and of Miranda Marín's pro-sovereignty project.

== Institutional proposals ==
=== Criteria of the PPD ===
The premise of the Pacto de Asociación establishes that it is meant to bring forth a non-colonial and non-territorial status in accordance to International Law and based on the sovereignty of the people of Puerto Rico. To make this clear, the English name would replace "Commonwealth" with "Free Associated State". The document states that the act of recognizing Puerto Rico's sovereignty and entering into a compact of free association will be undertaken in a single step, without undergoing a period of independence. The representative of the United States would be aware of this fact when signing the proposal, thus completing the jurisdictional transition. As a sovereign entity, Puerto Rico would support dual citizenship, and the Puerto Rican citizenship would be internationally recognized along with the United States citizenship, capable of issuing its own functional passports. The establishment of a complete self-government would extend Puerto Rico's international presence, allowing it to have seats in international organizations and open its own embassies. Free passage would continue between both countries. The document does integrate some of the demands of the conservative wing, noting that it could only be amended by mutual agreement. Any differences in its interpretation would be attended by a bilateral Pact Tribunal, created immediately after the compact is enacted.

It establishes that "acquired rights" such as Social Security, veterans, Medicare and Medicaid benefits would remain in place and that Puerto Ricans would continue to contribute to them. Internationally, Puerto Rico would revoke the application of the Cabotage Laws and would reserve the rights to control its land and sea (up to 200 miles offshore) for jurisdictional, environmental and communication purposes. The United States dollar would continue in use while Puerto Rico determines the application of tariffs, and in exchange the American banking laws will still apply. To secure the newly obtained fiscal autonomy, the United States would agree to contribute to six key economic aspects for a period of 30 years; education, health, private sector development, non-profit groups, the environment, and public infrastructure. Afterwards, both sides would decide if they will continue or modify this agreement. Local law enforcement would take priority, but cooperation with federal agencies to deal with concerns such as drug traffic is established. The United States will continue to have the right to retain military bases in Puerto Rican soil, but in exchange would have to contribute in the efforts to correct the environmental damage left by military practices in Vieques and Culebra, and control the flow of mail, but the (unilaterally established) Federal Court would be replaced in a period of three years.

=== Criteria of the MUS ===
The leadership of the MUS prefers to avoid the term ELA Soberano, instead simply referring to it as free association, claiming that it could be misinterpreted as a form of "enhanced" territorial Commonwealth. However, on September 12, 2013, the institution published a note stating that it would be willing to cooperate in an ELA Soberano proposal as long as it meets with a series of requirements. The first being that it should be compliant with Principle VI of the UN's 1541 Resolution and be product of a process of self-determination. The MUS also demands that Public Law 81-600, known as the Federal Relations Law and that keeps Puerto Rico subjected to the territorial clause, be abolished as part of the proposal stripping and retaining the sovereignty of Puerto Rico from the Congress of the United States. In a departure from the PPD's posture, the MUS seeks that the compact of association can be modified or concluded unilaterally as long as the decision is ratified by popular vote.

== Referendum definitions ==
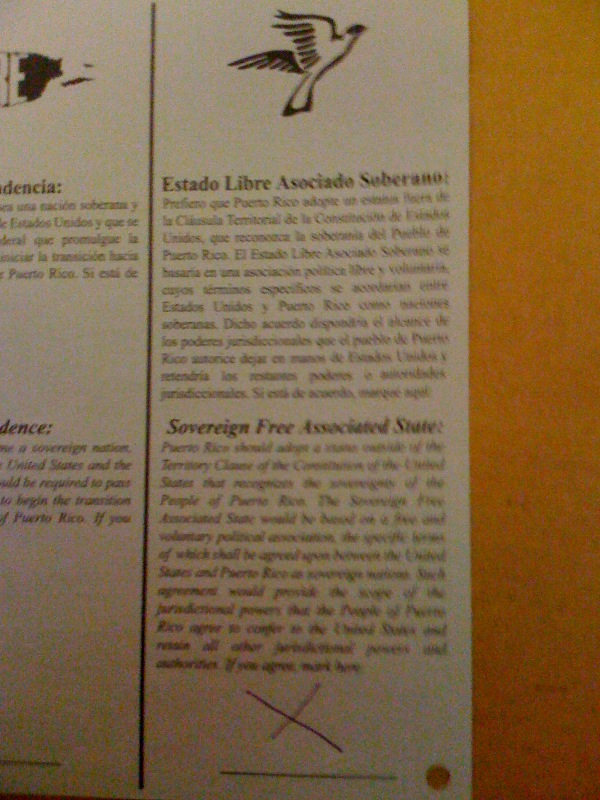
The Estado Libre Associado Soberano (Sovereign Free Associated State) option depicted in the ballot of the 2012 Puerto Rican status referendum.

=== 1998 ===
"This option would establish Puerto Rico as a sovereign nation separate from, but legally bound (on a terminable basis) to, the United States. As a general practice, free association would be preceded by recognition that Puerto Rico is a self-governing sovereign nation not part of the United States, because compacts of free association are legal documents between sovereign nations. Free association could be accompanied by a transition period in which the United States would continue to administer certain services and provide assistance to the island for a period of time specified in the compact. Free association could be annulled at any time by either nation. Negotiations over free association would likely decide issues of trade, defense, currency, and economic aid."

=== 2012 ===
"Puerto Rico should adopt a status outside of the Territory Clause of the Constitution of the United States that recognizes the sovereignty of the People of Puerto Rico. The Sovereign Free Associated State would be based on a free and voluntary political association, the specific terms of which shall be agreed upon between the United States and Puerto Rico as sovereign nations. Such agreement would provide the scope of the jurisdictional powers that the People of Puerto Rico agree to confer to the United States and retain all other jurisdictional powers and authorities."

=== 2017 referendum ===
Because there were almost 500,000 blank ballots in the 2012 referendum, creating confusion as to the voters' true desire, Congress decided to ignore the vote. On January 15, 2014, the House of Representatives approved $2.5 million in funding for Puerto Rico to hold a fifth referendum. The United States Senate then passed the bill, which was signed into law on January 17, 2014 by Barack Obama, then-President of the United States.

The Puerto Rican status referendum, 2017 was held on June 11. The previous plebiscites provided three: "remain a Commonwealth", "Statehood", and "Independence/Free Association". The 2017 referendum was supposed to be the first referendum to offer voters only two options, "Statehood" and "Independence/Free Association"; however, after a request from the United States Department of Justice, "current status" was added back to the ballot. The option had been removed from the 2017 referendum in response to the results of the 2012 referendum in which remaining in the current status had been rejected. However, the Trump administration cited changes in demographics during the past 5 years to justify adding the option again. The referendum returned a result for statehood; but the result was considered invalid for low turnout, as a result of anti-statehood voters boycotting the referendum due to assertions in the wording of the ballot that were not acceptable to the anti-statehood parties.

If the majority had favored Independence/Free Association, a second vote would have been held to determine the preference: full independence as a nation or associated free state status with independence but with a "free and voluntary political association" between Puerto Rico and the United States. The specifics of the association agreement would be detailed in the Compact of Free Association that would be negotiated between the U.S. and Puerto Rico. That document might cover topics such as the role of the US military in Puerto Rico, the use of the US currency, free trade between the two entities, and whether Puerto Ricans would be U.S. citizens.

Governor Ricardo Rosselló was strongly in favor of statehood to help develop the economy and help to "solve our 500-year-old colonial dilemma ... Colonialism is not an option .... It's a civil rights issue ... 3.5 million citizens seeking an absolute democracy," he told the news media.

Benefits of statehood include an additional $10 billion per year in federal funds, the right to vote in presidential elections, higher Social Security and Medicare benefits, and a right for its government agencies and municipalities to file for bankruptcy. The latter is currently prohibited.

At approximately the same time as the referendum, Puerto Rico's legislators are also expected to vote on a bill that would allow the Governor to draft a state constitution and hold elections to choose senators and representatives to the federal Congress. Regardless of the outcome of the referendum or the bill on drafting a constitution, Congress will be the body to make the final decision on the status of Puerto Rico.

Regardless of the outcome of either vote, action by the United States Congress would be necessary to implement changes to the status of Puerto Rico under the Territorial Clause of the United States Constitution.

If the majority of Puerto Ricans were to choose the Free Association option - and only 33% voted for it in 2012 - and if it were granted by the US Congress, Puerto Rico would become a Free Associated State, a virtually independent nation. It would have a political and economical treaty of association with the U.S. that would stipulate all delegated agreements. This could give Puerto Rico a similar status to Micronesia, the Marshall Islands, and Palau, countries that currently have a Compact of Free Association with the United States.

Those Free Associated States use the American dollar, receive some financial support and the promise of military defense if they refuse military access to any other country. Their citizens are allowed to work in the U.S. and serve in its military. The agreement with Puerto Rico as an FAS however may be entirely different than it is with the current three countries because of the longer and closer relationship the territory has had with the United States.

== United Nations Special Committee on Decolonization ==
Since 1953, the UN has been considering the Political status of Puerto Rico and how to assist it in achieving "independence" or "decolonization". In 1978, the Special Committee determined that a "colonial relationship" existed between the US and Puerto Rico.

Note that the United Nations Special Committee on Decolonization has often referred to Puerto Rico as a nation in its reports, because, internationally, the people of Puerto Rico are often considered to be a Caribbean nation with their own national identity. Most recently, in a June 2016 report, the Special Committee called for the United States to expedite the process to allow self-determination in Puerto Rico. More specifically, the group called on the United States to expedite a process that would allow the people of Puerto Rico to exercise fully their right to self-determination and independence. ... [and] allow the Puerto Rican people to take decisions in a sovereign manner and to address their urgent economic and social needs, including unemployment, marginalization, insolvency and poverty".

== See also ==
- Puerto Rico statehood movement
- Puerto Rico Democracy Act of 2007 (H.R. 900 & S. 1936)
- Puerto Rican citizenship
- Territories of the United States
- Proposed political status for Puerto Rico
- Voting rights in Puerto Rico
- Politics of Puerto Rico
- Political status of Puerto Rico
- Special Committee on Decolonization
- United Nations list of non-self-governing territories
- Privileges and Immunities Clause
- Outline of Puerto Rico

== Footnotes ==
=== Bibliography ===
- Roberto Colón Ocasio (2009). Antonio Fernós - Soberanista, Luis Muñoz Marín - Autonomista: Divergencias ideológicas y su efecto en el desarrollo del Estado Libre Asociado de Puerto Rico (in Spanish). Ediciones Puerto. p. 138. ISBN 978-1934461662.
- Janvier a, Hernandez libros el telegrafo (2025). Prexit: Forging Puerto Rico's Path to Sovereignty (in Spanish). Editorial. p. 386. ISBN 978-1676722182.
