= Bills in U.S. Congress regarding the political status of Puerto Rico =

Major bills regarding the political status of Puerto Rico

The Territories Clause of the United States Constitution (Art. IV, Sec. 3, cl. 2) allows for Congress to "dispose of" Puerto Rico and allow it to become independent of the U.S. (in the same way as the Philippines did in 1945) or, under the authority of the Admissions Clause (Art. IV, Sec. 3, cl. 1) for it to be admitted as a state of the United States (with a vote of Congress in the same way that Alaska and Hawaii were admitted in 1958 and 1959 respectively).

Since Congress must approve of any political status change for Puerto Rico, some argue that "congressional agreement to the options [on a ballot], prior to a plebiscite would save the people of Puerto Rico the grief of an emotionally draining and politically divisive vote that might result in a status not acceptable to Congress." Former Resident Commissioner and Former Governor Carlos Romero Barceló echoed this sentiment when he recalled, at a 1997 congressional hearing, that both "[Representatives] Young and Miller were clear in stating [in their March 3, 1997, letter to the presidents of the three political parties in Puerto Rico] that there was no purpose in presenting the people of Puerto Rico a status definition which does not represent an option that the Congress will be willing to ratify should it be approved in a plebiscite."

A catalyst for the legislative activity taking place in Congress was the release in December 2005 of the presidential task force's report. Per United States v. Sanchez, 992 F.2d 1143, 1152–53 (11th Cir. 1993), "Congress continues to be the ultimate source of power [over Puerto Rico] pursuant to the Territory Clause of the Constitution." (quoting United States v. Andino, 831 F.2d 1164, 1176 (1st Cir. 1987) (Torruella, J., concurring), cert. denied, 486 U.S. 1034 (1988)), cert. denied, 510 U.S. 11 10 (1994).9 An Act of Congress, thus, is ultimately required to modify the current political status of Puerto Rico.

Ten bills regarding the political status of Puerto Rico have come before Congress, H.R. 856 (1997), H.R. 900 (2007), H.R. 2499 (2009), H.R. 2000 (2013), H.R. 1965 and 4901 (2019), H.R. 1522 and S. 780 (2021), and H.R. 8393 (2022).

== The United States-Puerto Rico Political Status Act (H.R. 856) ==
In 1997, The United States-Puerto Rico Political Status Act (H.R. 856) was introduced in Congress, passing in the House in 1998, but not in the Senate. The bill was legislative initiative by U.S. House of Representatives to help refine the political status of the Commonwealth of Puerto Rico. This bill, unlike any other bill in U.S. Congress regarding the Puerto Rico political status issue, made its way to both chambers of Congress. The House considered four versions of the bill. The version approved on March 4, 1998, which would have authorized referendums at least once every ten years, through which the people of Puerto Rico could indicate their preference among three status options: (1) “Puerto Rico should retain Commonwealth”; (2) ”The people of Puerto Rico should become fully self-governing through separate sovereignty in the form of independence or free association”; or (3) “Puerto Rico should become fully self-governing through Statehood.” The Senate, however, did not take formal action on the measure. On September 17, 1998, the Senate approved a resolution expressing the sense of the Senate that “(1) the Senate supports and recognizes the right of United States citizens residing in Puerto Rico to express democratically their views regarding their future political status through a referendum or other public forum, and to communicate those views to the President and Congress; and (2) the Federal Government should review any such communication.” The version forwarded to the Senate offered Puerto Ricans these options for their political future: Statehood, Independence, Associated Republic, or the current Commonwealth status. The bill proposed to carry out a referendum in Puerto Rico in which the people of Puerto Rico could choose the option they preferred.

The proposal, however, was controversial in Puerto Rican politics for two reasons: 1) the legislation was encouraged by two avid statehood supporters, and seemed to favor unchangeable status choices over Commonwealth; and 2) the Commonwealth option in the bill defined Puerto Rico as a "territory subject to the supreme powers of the U.S Congress". The Popular Democratic Party (PPD) disagreed with this definition that appeared to emphasize the island was a colony of the United States, and not a true commonwealth. The PPD thus fiercely opposed the H. R. 856, because it diminished their sense of Commonwealth (Estado Libre Asociado) as agreement between two peoples.

This reaction was consistent with the contents of the bill, since H. R. 856, as officially ordered to be printed by its sponsor, Alaska Congressman Don Young, stated in its findings that Puerto Rico "does not have the status of 'free association' with the United States as that status is defined under United States law or international practice."

The travails of H.R. 856 in the House of Representatives exemplify the hurdles from conservative and liberal members of Congress that any status choices by Puerto Rico will likely face in Congress. The bill was introduced by representative Gerald Solomon (R-NY).

A number of amendments were debated, seeking, for example, to make English the official language, getting Congress to recognize that Puerto Rico is sociologically and culturally a Caribbean and Latin American nation with a distinctive culture, and recognizing the separate and distinct nature of Puerto Rican citizenship in relation to U.S. citizenship. Ultimately the bill died in the Senate.

In 2005, the U.S. House Committee on Resources concluded that Puerto Rico is still an unincorporated territory of the United States under the Territorial Clause, that the establishment of local self-government with the consent of the people can be unilaterally revoked by U.S. Congress, and Congress can withdraw, at any time, the American citizenship now enjoyed by the residents of Puerto Rico as long as it achieves a legitimate Federal purpose, in a manner reasonably related to that purpose.

In 2006, Resident Commissioner Luis Fortuño (R-PR) and Rep. Jose E. Serrano (D-NY) introduced a bipartisan House bill to implement the recommendations, which was cosponsored by over 60 Republicans and over 40 Democrats, significantly more cosponsors than the H.R. 856 bill which cleared the House in 1998. The House Committee on Resources called a hearing on the subject on April 27, 2006, signaling a greater degree of interest than previously anticipated.

== The Puerto Rico Democracy Act of 2007 (H.R. 900) ==
At the beginning of the 110th Congress (2007–2008), Serrano and Fortuño introduced their bill again as H.R. 900. It was titled the Puerto Rico Democracy Act of 2007. A first hearing was held by the Subcommittee on Insular Affairs in March 2007. A final hearing was held on April 25 to hear Governor Aníbal Acevedo Vilá, Senate President Kenneth McClintock, Speaker José Aponte and the White House Report's co-author Kevin Marshall before the bill was brought to a full committee vote by Resources Committee chair Nick Rahall (D-WV).

On October 23, 2007, that Resources Committee unanimously approved a substitute bill of H.R. 900, which establishes that before 2009, a first plebiscite will be held in which Puerto Ricans will be asked if they desire to maintain their territorial status, in a yes or no question. The bill states that should No be the favored choice, either another plebiscite asking between statehood, independence or an associated republic, or a constitutional assembly would follow thereafter, by choice of the United States Federal Court of Puerto Rico. The bill was never considered by the full United States House of Representatives and died with the end of the 110th Congress. The bill was introduced again in 2009, and passed the Resources Committee on July 28 of that year and the full House in 2010, but died in the Senate.

During 2007, the Senate came up with its own version of the bill, S.1936. This bill, also titled the Puerto Rico Democracy Act of 2007, aimed to provide for a plebiscite on the future status of Puerto Rico. However, it never made it out of Committee before that session of Congress was over.

== The Puerto Rico Democracy Act of 2010 (H.R. 2499) ==
In May 2009, Resident Commissioner Pedro Pierluisi sponsored a new version of the Puerto Rico Democracy Act bill (H.R. 2499) now titled The Puerto Rico Democracy Act of 2010, aimed at providing for "a federally sanctioned self-determination process for the people of Puerto Rico." The bill, if enacted, would provide for referendums to be held in Puerto Rico to determine the Island's ultimate political status.

The bill would provide for a referendum giving Puerto Ricans the choice between the options of (1) retaining their present political status, or (2) choosing a new status. If the latter option (2) were to win, then a separate referendum would be held where Puerto Ricans would be given the option of being admitted as a US State "on equal footing with the other states", or becoming a "sovereign nation, either fully independent from or in free association with the United States." If the first option garnished the most votes, a new referendum would be held again every 8 years.

The bill enjoyed bi-partisan support in the House of Representatives, with 181 co-sponsors. On June 24, 2009, the U.S. House Committee on Natural Resources held a hearing on the bill with the participation of the Governor of Puerto Rico, and others like Jennifer Gonzalez, speaker of the Puerto Rico House of Representatives, Thomas Rivera Schatz, president of the Senate of Puerto Rico. The House Natural Resources Committee, approved the bill and referred it to the United States House of Representatives floor with a 30 in favor 8 against vote. The bill was passed by the House on April 29, 2010.

The U.S. Senate Energy and Natural Resources Committee Chair Senator Jeff Bingaman (D-NM) and Ranking Member Senator Lisa Murkowski (R-AK) formally requested the White House to share President's position regarding The Puerto Rico Democracy Act of 2010 (H.R. 2499) and constitutionally viable status alternatives in a letter dated May 27 following a hearing on the legislation. The Senators requested the President's Task Force on Puerto Rico's Status clarify the White House position on the issue. According to the Senate Energy & Natural Resources Committee leadership, the four options are the continuation of the current commonwealth status, subject to the territorial clause (under Article IV of the Constitution), statehood, independence, and free association. “Efforts to address Puerto Rico’s political status have been hampered by a failure of the federal government to clearly define these status options and that failure has undermined Puerto Rico’s efforts to accurately assess the views of the voters,” the letter stated. “In recent years, however, a consistent administration and congressional view has emerged that only four status options are available for Puerto Rico’s future relations with the United States.” Bingaman and Murkowski wrote that “this analysis of the status options favored by the principal political parties in Puerto Rico concludes that a fifth option, ‘New Commonwealth,’ is incompatible with the Constitution and basic laws of the United States in several respects,” according to the analysis and conclusion of the U.S. Department of Justice under the administrations of Presidents Bill Clinton and George W. Bush. Absent a White House response to the Senate’s request, the Senate did not act on H.R. 2499.

== The Puerto Rico Status Resolution Act of 2013 (H.R. 2000) ==
On May 15, 2013, non-voting Resident Commissioner Pedro Perluisi sponsored H.R. 2000 "to set forth the process for Puerto Rico to be admitted as a state of the Union."

== The Puerto Rico Admission Act of 2017 (H.R. 260) ==
On January 4, 2017, non-voting Resident Commissioner Jenniffer Aydin González Colón sponsored H.R. 260 "To enable the admission of the territory of Puerto Rico into the Union as a State, and for other purposes." The bill was referred to the House Committee on Natural Resources.

== Puerto Rico Admission Act (H.R. 1965) ==
A bill (H.R. 1965) for the establishment of "a process to enable the U.S. territory of Puerto Rico to be admitted into the Union as a state" was introduced on March 28, 2019, by Florida Rep. Darren Soto.

== Puerto Rico Statehood Admission Act of 2019 (H.R. 4901) ==
A bill (H.R. 4901) for Puerto Ricans to vote "yes" or "no" on statehood was introduced on October 29, 2019, by New York Rep. José E. Serrano, but died in committee.

== Puerto Rico Statehood Admission Act of 2021 (H.R. 1522/S. 780) ==
Two bills (H.R. 1522 and S. 780) for the admission of Puerto Rico into the Union were introduced on March 2, 2021, by Soto and on March 16 by New Mexico Sen. Martin Heinrich respectively.

== Puerto Rico Self-Determination Act ==
The Puerto Rico Self-Determination Act of 2020 was introduced in the House in 2020 by Representatives Alexandria Ocasio-Cortez and Nydia Velázquez. On March 18, 2021, Ocasio-Cortez, Velázquez and Senator Bob Menendez introduced a new version, the Puerto Rico Self-Determination Act of 2021, with over 70 co-sponsors in the House and seven co-sponsors in the Senate, including one Republican.

== Puerto Rico Status Act (H.R. 8393) ==
On December 15, 2022, H.R. 8393 passed the House of Representatives in a 233–191 vote with 11 absences, the first bill regarding Puerto Rico's statehood to do so. It would have instituted a binding referendum that would allow Puerto Ricans to vote on the future status of the island, that Congress would have to obey. Every Democrat voted in favor of the bill, and was joined by 16 Republicans.

== Puerto Rico Wicker Bill Status Act (FLO23795 38G) ==
In September 2023, Roger Wicker reintroduced legislation in the United States Congress on the territorial status of Puerto Rico. a two-round consultation process. The first vote is scheduled for August 4, 2024, where Puerto Ricans will have the choice between four alternatives: annexation to the United States, independence, sovereignty in free association, and a free state associated with the United States.
