= United States-Puerto Rico Political Status Act =

Proposed American legislation

The United States-Puerto Rico Political Status Act (1998) was a bill proposed in the United States Congress to help refine the political status of Puerto Rico. The senior sponsor of the bill was Representative Don Young, Republican of Alaska. While a version was approved in the House, it failed to reach a vote in the Senate.

== Definition ==
The bill offered Puerto Ricans four options for their political future: statehood, independence, associated republic, or the current commonwealth status. The project proposed to carry out a referendum in which the people of Puerto Rico could choose the option they preferred.

== Controversy ==
The proposal was controversial in Puerto Rican politics for several reasons. Governor Pedro Rosselló and Resident Commissioner Carlos Romero Barceló, two avid supporters of statehood, were advocates of the legislation, and thus the bill was seen with suspicion by non-statehooders. Second, the legislation seemed to favor unchangeable status choices over commonwealth status, and the Commonwealth option in the bill defined Puerto Rico as a "territory subject to the supreme powers of the U.S. Congress." The Popular Democratic Party of Puerto Rico (PPD) disagreed with this definition, stating that it portrayed the island as a colony of the United States, and not as a true commonwealth or free associated state (estado libre associado) between two nations. The PPD opposed the bill.

The positions regarding Puerto Rican status within the U.S. National Parties are not monolithic. Overall, the national Democratic Party identifies mostly with Commonwealth supporters, with minorities favoring statehood or independence. The Republican Party are also conflicted. Nearly every presidential candidate for the Republican party has endorsed statehood; but many legislators worry about the potential for a Spanish-speaking majority state of Puerto Rico to tip the balance of power in congress. Some welcome the fiscal benefits of detaching the island from the U.S.

The travails of H.R. 856 in the House of Representatives exemplifies the hurdles from conservative and liberal members that any status choice by Puerto Rico will face in Congress. The bill was introduced by conservative representative Gerald Solomon (Republican – New York or R-NY). The following amendments, many by liberal NY and IL congressman were debated:

- Solomon: sought English be declared the official language of U.S. Substituted by Burton (R-IN) which encouraged English proficiency for all Puerto Ricans by age 10. Passed 240–177.
- Gutierrez (Democrat- Illinois or D-IL); made Spanish official language of Puerto Rico. Failed 13–406.
- Serrano (D-NY); allow U.S. citizens born in island but residing outside of Puerto Rico to vote in referendums; failed 57–356.
- Serrano (D-NY): allow persons with one parent born in Puerto Rico to vote in referendum; failed by voice vote.
- Gutierrez (D-NY): Congress recognizes Puerto Rico is sociologically and culturally a Caribbean and Latin American nation with a distinctive culture that has Spanish as a common language; failed by voice vote.
- Stearns (R-FL): required a run-off referendum within 90 days between 2 options which received most votes; failed: 28–384
- Gutierrez (D-IL): delete language in the findings section of the bill which references the Treaty of Paris; Failed by voice vote.
- Barr (R-GA): require the approval of statehood by a super-majority of 75% of the valid votes cast. failed: 131–282
- Velazquez (D-NY): add language to the findings section of the bill recognizing the separate and distinct nature of Puerto Rican citizenship in relation to U.S. citizenship. Failed by voice vote.
- Gutierrez (D-IL): allow Puerto Rico to retain its separate Olympic Committee and to compete under its own flag and national anthem in international athletic competitions; failed: 2–413
- Gutierrez (D-IL): retain certain corporate tax provisions for Puerto Rico for 20 years after statehood and exempt Puerto Ricans from U.S. federal tax until the State of Puerto Rico achieves same per capita income as the State with next lowest per capita income. Failed by voice vote.

Ultimately, Puerto Rico, while under the PNP leadership of Governor Rosselló, held a status referendum in December 1998, using criteria from the Bill, despite the lack of a Bill's approval. The PPD opposed the referendum unless different wording was used for the Commonwealth option. The PNP pointed out that any such status change would require congressional approval, and at least the Bill's terminology had mustered House support. In response, the PPD urged Puerto Ricans to choose the None of the Above option, as a means to reject the offered status choices. The success of this option in the polls while expressing disapproval, does not express a preference among the Bill's options.

== See also ==
- Government of Puerto Rico
- United States politics and the political status of Puerto Rico
