= Puerto Rico Status Act =

2021 U.S. legislative attempt to grant Puerto Rican statehood

- Long title: To enable the people of Puerto Rico to choose a permanent, nonterritorial, fully self-governing political status for Puerto Rico and to provide for a transition to and the implementation of that permanent, nonterritorial, fully self-governing political status, and for other purposes.
- Announced in: the 118th United States Congress
- Sponsored by: Darren Soto (D–FL)
- Number of co-sponsors: 95

Legislative history
- Introduced in the House of Representatives as H.R. 2757 by Darren Soto (D–FL) and Jenniffer González (R–PR) on April 20, 2023; Committee consideration by House Committee on Natural Resources

The Puerto Rico Status Act, H.R. 2757, was a bill introduced during the 116th United States Congress. The intention of the bill is to grant Puerto Rico, an unincorporated territory of the United States, admission into the Union as a state. The bill was originally introduced in the 116th Congress and was reintroduced as H.R. 1522, on March 2, 2021, in the 117th Congress. It was referred to the House Committee on Natural Resources with last action taken on June 16, 2021.

During the 117th United States Congress, the bill, as H.R. 8393, passed the House on December 15, 2022, with a vote of 233–191, but died in the Senate.

== Background ==
In 1898, following the conclusion of the Spanish–American War, Spain ceded the Caribbean island of Puerto Rico and its surrounding archipelago to the United States. Initially run by the military, from 1900 onwards measures began to be enacted giving the people of Puerto Rico a measure of local civilian government, while bringing the population more within the larger community of the United States. This began with the establishment of the elected House of Delegates in 1900, while in 1902 the post of Resident Commissioner was established. The Resident Commissioner was a non-voting member, similar to other non-voting members of the House of Representatives, intended to represent the interests of Puerto Rico in the United States Congress. However, unlike other territories, Puerto Rico's was not named as a "delegate", as it was argued that such a title gave an implication that the territory was on the road towards becoming a state, which was not guaranteed for possessions obtained as a result of war. In 1917 the Jones–Shafroth Act saw the creation of an elected Senate, as well as granting U.S. citizenship to all Puerto Ricans born after April 25, 1898. In 1947, the Elective Governor Act granted Puerto Rico the right to its own elected governor for the first time, while in 1950 Puerto Rico was granted the right to hold a constitutional convention, with a view to the territory having its own constitution. Approved in a referendum in 1952, the new Puerto Rican constitution changed the status of the territory into that of an unincorporated "Commonwealth". In this context, Puerto Rico is a territory that is controlled by the federal government, but in which the full provisions of the Constitution are not in force.

=== Statehood movement ===
Puerto Rico is the largest of the United States' overseas territories, both in terms of size and population. Its population is about 3 million. Its political status does not allow Puerto Ricans the right to vote for their head of state, or have full representation in the Congress. Becoming a state would allow Puerto Rico full representation, giving it two members of the United States Senate, as well as a number of members of the House of Representatives. The Huntington–Hill method estimates that, were Puerto Rico to become a state, it would be entitled to four seats in the House. Statehood would also give Puerto Rico a number of votes in the electoral college responsible for electing the President. Statehood would also allow Puerto Rico greater access to federal funding programs that states enjoy, an issue that became increasingly apparent following recent natural disasters that affected the island, most notably Hurricane Maria in 2017, the effects of which caused as much as $90 billion worth of damage, with the response of the federal government being heavily criticised.

In 2017, following the success of the pro-statehood Partido Nuevo Progresista (PNP) in gaining control of the Legislative Assembly, as well as the governorship, Puerto Rico followed the example of Washington, D.C. by appointing a delegation of shadow congresspeople, with two senators and five representatives. The purpose of this delegation, set up by the Puerto Rico Equality Commission, is to lobby the United States Congress over the question of statehood.

A number of referendums were held on Puerto Rico's potential future status, with the first of these taking place in 1967. Since the first, these have seen support for statehood steadily increase, even as the set up of each referendum has altered. Prior to 2019, the most recent was held in 2017, and saw 97% choose statehood as the option. However, this was on a turnout of just over 22%, as a result of a boycott of the vote by many of Puerto Rico's major political parties.

In 2017, Jenniffer González Colón, the non-voting Resident Commissioner, introduced a bill into the House of Representatives requiring the Congress support the holding of a vote on Puerto Rico's status and, in the event of a vote in favor of statehood, that it undertake the necessary preparations, including the amendment or repeal of legislation related to Puerto Rico as a territory, prior to Puerto Rico being admitted by January 3, 2025. This bill was referred to the House Committee on Natural Resources, but did not reach a vote on the floor of the House.

In October 2019, a new bill was introduced by José E. Serrano, a Democratic congressman from New York, who was born in Puerto Rico, intended to bring about Puerto Rico's admission. Unlike the previous bill, which had just a single cosponsor, this received a total of 60 cosponsors, including 42 Democrats and 18 Republicans. As with the 2017 bill, it was referred to the Committee on Natural Resources, but did not reach a vote in the full House.

== Provisions ==
A corresponding bill, the Law for the Final Definition of the Political Status of Puerto Rico, was introduced in Puerto Rico's Legislative Assembly and approved by both its houses in March 2020. It was through this that the 2020 plebiscite was held, which provided a majority in favor of statehood.

== Popular opinion in Puerto Rico, and the states ==
Although the 2020 plebiscite provided a majority in favor of statehood, there were many articles written since it took place, pointing out that the turnout was a little over 52%, with 623,000 of the 2.3 million registered voters in Puerto Rico voting for statehood. While opinion polls among the population in the United States seem to favor Puerto Rico's admission, support for which has been relatively high since the 1960s, in Puerto Rico itself there is a seemingly higher degree of ambivalence to the idea, based on Puerto Rico's national identity, which may potentially be lost were it to become a full part of the United States. However, the pro-independence Puerto Rican Independence Party (Partido Independentista Puertorriqueño, PIP) candidate for governor received only 14% of the vote in the 2020 election, coming in fourth place.

Although statehood has formed part of the party platforms of both major parties in the United States, senior figures in the Republican Party publicly indicated their opposition to the admission of Puerto Rico, with Mitch McConnell, the then Senate Majority Leader, saying in 2019 that moves to admit Puerto Rico, as well as Washington D.C., amounted to "full-bore socialism", with both potential new states likely to return perpetual Democratic members of the Senate, and so the Republican majority would oppose the entry of both. This is in spite of evidence that voters in Puerto Rico may well be more conservative than voters in Washington, D.C. – at the time of the 2020 vote, the Governor, Resident Commissioner, Speaker of the Puerto Rico House of Representatives and President of the Puerto Rico Senate, although members of the pro-statehood PNP, also sat as conservative Republicans. Despite the seemingly fixed position of the Senate leadership, legislators of both parties, following the result of the 2020 vote, indicated a willingness to open the debate of Puerto Rico's status in Congress.

== Legislative history ==
As of June 15, 2026:

Congress	Short title	Bill number(s)	Date introduced	Sponsor(s)	No. of cosponsors	Latest action
116th Congress	Puerto Rico Statehood Admission Act of 2019	H.R. 1965	March 28, 2019	Darren Soto (D‑FL)	21	Died in committee
116th Congress	Puerto Rico Statehood Admission Act of 2019	H.R. 4901	October 29, 2019	José E. Serrano (D‑NY)	60	Died in committee
117th Congress	Puerto Rico Statehood Admission Act of 2021	H.R. 1522	March 2, 2021	Darren Soto (D‑FL)	81	Died in committee
117th Congress	Puerto Rico Statehood Admission Act of 2021	S. 780	March 16, 2021	Martin Heinrich (D‑NM)	5	Died in committee
117th Congress	Puerto Rico Status Act	H.R. 8393	July 15, 2022	Raúl Grijalva (D‑AZ)	62	Passed in the House (233–191)
118th Congress	Puerto Rico Status Act	H.R. 2757	April 20, 2023	Raúl Grijalva (D‑AZ)	101	Died in committee
118th Congress	Puerto Rico Status Act	S. 2944	September 27, 2023	Roger Wicker (R‑MS)	0	Died in committee
118th Congress	Puerto Rico Status Act	S. 3231	November 26, 2023	Martin Heinrich (D‑NM)	26	Died in committee
119th Congress	Puerto Rico Democratic Self Determination Act	H.R. 9246	June 10, 2026	Pablo Hernández Rivera (D‑PR)	8	Referred to committee

== See also ==
- Puerto Rico statehood movement
- 2012 Puerto Rican status referendum
- Washington, D.C., Admission Act
