= United Nations list of non-self-governing territories =

Type of territory defined by the United Nations Charter

UN General Assembly Resolution 66 (I)
- United Nations General Assembly resolution A/RES/66 (I) dated 14 January 1946
- Date: 14 December 1946
- Meeting no.: Sixty fourth
- Code: A/RES/66(1) (Document)
- Subject: Transmission of information under Article 73e of the Charter [relating to non-self-governing territories]
- Result: Adopted

Chapter XI of the United Nations Charter defines a non-self-governing territory (NSGT) as a territory "whose people have not yet attained a full measure of self-government". Chapter XI of the UN Charter also includes a "Declaration on Non-Self-Governing Territories" that the interests of the occupants of dependent territories are paramount and requires member states of the United Nations in control of such territories to submit annual information reports concerning the development of those territories. Since 1946, the UNGA has maintained a list of non-self governing territories under member states' control. Since its inception, dozens of territories have been removed from the list, typically when they attained independence or internal self-government, while other territories have been added as new administering powers joined the United Nations or the UN General Assembly (UNGA) reassessed their status.

Since 1961 the list has been maintained by the Special Committee on Decolonization.

== History ==
Chapter XI of the UN Charter contains a Declaration Concerning Non-Self-Governing Territories. Article 73(e) requires UN member states to report to the United Nations annually on the development of NSGTs under their control. From the initial reports provided by eight member states (Australia, Belgium, Denmark, France, the Netherlands, New Zealand, the United Kingdom and the United States), a list was compiled in 1946 listing 72 NSGTs. In several instances, administering powers were later allowed to remove dependent territories from the list, either unilaterally (as in the case of French overseas territories such as French Polynesia), or by a vote of the General Assembly (as in the cases of Puerto Rico, Greenland, the Netherlands Antilles, and Suriname).

Map of territories on the United Nations list of non-self-governing territories

The list draws its origins from the period of colonialism and the Charter's concept of non-self-governing territories. As an increasing number of formerly colonized countries became UN members, the General Assembly increasingly asserted its authority to place additional territories on the list and repeatedly declared that only the General Assembly had the authority to authorize a territory's being removed from the list upon attainment of any status other than full independence. For example, when Portugal joined the United Nations it contended that it did not control any non-self-governing territory, claiming that areas such as Angola and Mozambique were an integral part of the Portuguese state, but the General Assembly rejected this position. Similarly, Western Sahara was added in 1963 when it was a Spanish colony; as with Namibia, which was seen, due to its former status as a League of Nations mandate territory, as a vestige of German colonial legacy in Africa, until it was removed in 1990 upon its independence. A set of criteria for determining whether a territory is to be considered "non-self-governing" was established in General Assembly Resolution 1541 (XV) of 1960. Also in 1960, the General Assembly adopted Resolution 1514 (XV), promulgating the "Declaration on the Granting of Independence to Colonial Countries and Peoples", which declared that all remaining non-self-governing territories and trust territories were entitled to self-determination and independence. The following year, the General Assembly established the Special Committee on the Situation with Regard to the Implementation of the Declaration on the Granting of Independence to Colonial Countries and Peoples (sometimes referred to as the Special Committee on Decolonization, or the "Committee of 24" because for much of its history the committee was composed of 24 members), which reviews the situation in non-self-governing territories each year and reports to the General Assembly. A revised list in 1963 listed 64 NSGTs.

== Resolutions adopted ==
=== 1946 ===
- UNGA Resolution 64(I) regarding the Establishment of the Trusteeship Council.
- UNGA Resolution 66(I) regarding Transmission of information under Article 73 e of the Charter.

=== 1947 ===
- UNGA Resolution 142(II) regarding Standard form for the guidance of Members in the preparation of information to be transmitted under Article 73 e of the Charter.
- UNGA Resolution 143(II) regarding Supplemental documents relating to information transmitted under Article 73 e of the Charter.
- UNGA Resolution 144(II) regarding Voluntary transmission of information regarding the development of self-governing institutions in the Non-Self-Governing Territories.
- UNGA Resolution 145(II) regarding Collaboration of the specialized agencies in regard to Article 73 e of the Charter.
- UNGA Resolution 146(II) regarding Creation of a special committee on information transmitted under Article 73 e of the Charter.

=== 1960 ===
- UNGA Resolution 1514 (XV) Declaration on the granting of independence to colonial countries and peoples.
- UNGA regarding Principles which should guide members in determining whether or not an obligation exists to transmit the information called for under Article 73e of the Charter.

=== 1961 ===
- UNGA Resolution 1654 (XVI) regarding the situation with regard to the implementation of the Declaration on the granting of independence to colonial countries and peoples.

=== 1966 ===
- International Covenant on Economic, Social and Cultural Rights adopted by the UNGA on 16 December 1966.
- International Covenant on Civil and Political Rights adopted by the UNGA on 19 December 1966.

=== 1990–2000 ===
- UNGA Resolution A/RES/43/45 regarding Implementation of the Declaration on the Granting of Independence to Colonial Countries and Peoples.
- UNGA Resolution A/RES/43/46 regarding Dissemination of information on decolonization.
- UNGA Resolution A/RES/43/47 regarding International Decade for the Eradication of Colonialism.

=== 2001–2010 ===
- UNGA Resolution 55/145 regarding Dissemination of information on decolonization.
- UNGA Resolution 55/146 regarding 2nd International Decade for the Eradication of Colonialism.
- UNGA Resolution 55/147 regarding Implementation of the Declaration on the Granting of Independence to Colonial Countries and Peoples.
- United Nations Economic and Social Council (ECOSOC) Resolution 2007/25 regarding Support to Non-Self-Governing Territories by the specialized agencies and international institutions associated with the United Nations.

=== 2011–present ===
- UNGA Resolution 65/116 regarding Dissemination of information on decolonization.
- UNGA Resolution 65/117 regarding Implementation of the Declaration on the Granting of Independence to Colonial Countries and Peoples.
- UNGA Resolution 65/118 regarding Fiftieth anniversary of the Declaration on the Granting of Independence to Colonial Countries and Peoples.
- UNGA Resolution 65/119 regarding 3rd International Decade for the Eradication of Colonialism.

== Current entries ==
The following 17 territories are currently included in the list.

Overview of non-self-governing territories
Territory	Administering power	Domestic legal status	Other claimant(s)	Population	Area		Referendum(s)	See also
Territory	Administering power	Domestic legal status	Other claimant(s)	Population	km^{2}	mi^{2}	Referendum(s)	See also
American Samoa	United States	Unincorporated unorganized territory	None	55,519	200	77	No official referendum has been held.	Politics of American Samoa
Anguilla	United Kingdom	Overseas territory	None	14,108	96	37	No official referendum has been held.	Politics of Anguilla
Bermuda	United Kingdom	Overseas territory	None	62,000	57	22	A 1995 Bermudian independence referendum was held. 74% of votes cast were against independence.	Politics of Bermuda
British Virgin Islands	United Kingdom	Overseas territory	None	28,103	153	59	No official referendum has been held.	Politics of the British Virgin Islands
Cayman Islands	United Kingdom	Overseas territory	None	55,500	264	102	No official referendum has been held.	Foreign relations of the Cayman Islands
Falkland Islands	United Kingdom	Overseas territory	Argentina	3,662	12,173	4,700	Two referendums have been held in 1986 and 2013 on whether the Falklands should join Argentina. On both occasions, voters overwhelmingly chose continued British control.	Falkland Islands sovereignty dispute
French Polynesia (Note: On 18 May 2013, the United Nations General Assembly voted to place French Polynesia back on the list.)	France	Overseas country	None	271,000	4,000	1,500	No official referendum has been held.	Politics of French Polynesia
Gibraltar	United Kingdom	Overseas territory	Spain	29,752	6	2.3	There were referendums in 1967 and in 2002, both returning an overwhelming victory for the pro-British side.	Status of Gibraltar
Guam	United States	Unincorporated organized territory	None	159,358	540	210	Three status referendums have been held, one in 1976 and two in 1982 (one in January and the other in September), with all three of them supporting an improved Commonwealth status under US control.	Politics of Guam
Montserrat	United Kingdom	Overseas territory	None	5,000	103	40	No official referendum has been held.	Government of Montserrat
New Caledonia (Note: On 2 December 1986, the United Nations General Assembly voted to place New Caledonia back on the list.)	France	Sui generis collectivity	None	252,000	18,575	7,172	There were referendums in 1987, 2018, 2020, and 2021, all deciding against independence. The 2021 referendum was boycotted, and unrest broke out in the middle of 2024 from constitutional changes proposed from the 2021 vote.	Politics of New Caledonia
Pitcairn (Note: Officially the Pitcairn, Henderson, Ducie and Oeno Islands. Only Pitcairn Island is inhabited.)	United Kingdom	Overseas territory	None	50	36	14	No official referendum has been held.	Politics of the Pitcairn Islands
Saint Helena (Note: Officially Saint Helena, Ascension and Tristan da Cunha.)	United Kingdom	Overseas territory	None	5,396	310	120	No official referendum has been held.	Politics of Saint Helena
Tokelau	New Zealand	Territory	None	1,411	12	4.6	There were two referendums on self-determination in Tokelau in 2006 and 2007, with both coming just shy of the required two-thirds "yes" margin.	Politics of Tokelau
Turks and Caicos Islands	United Kingdom	Overseas territory	None	31,458	948	366	No official referendum has been held.	Politics of the Turks and Caicos Islands
United States Virgin Islands	United States	Unincorporated organized territory	None	106,405	352	136	A status referendum was held in 1993. The status quo was widely preferred among voters, but the result was invalidated because of the low turnout.	Politics of the United States Virgin Islands
Western Sahara	Disputed (Note: It is disputed whether or not Morocco is a de facto administering power or an occupational power under international law.); Spain (de jure) (Note: In 1976, Spain withdrew from Western Sahara and informed the Secretary-General of the United Nations that it no longer considers itself responsible for the territory. Nonetheless, the criminal division of the Audiencia Nacional ruled in 2014 that Spain remains as Western Sahara's de jure administering power. This position is shared by the United Nations, the African Union, and several jurists. Additionally, Spain continues to manage Western Saharan airspace.)	Disputed	Morocco; Sahrawi Republic	619,060	266,000	103,000	The United Nations Mission for the Referendum in Western Sahara has attempted to organize a referendum since 1991, but none has been held so far.	Political status of Western Sahara

== Former entries ==
The following territories were originally listed by UN General Assembly Resolution 66 (I) of 14 December 1946 as Trust and Non-Self-Governing Territory. The dates show the year of independence or other change in a territory's status which led to their removal from the list, after which information was no longer submitted to the United Nations.

=== Change in status by administering power ===
Overview of non-self-governing territories that had a change in status
Trust / Territory	Change in status	Current status	Administering power	Population	Area / km^{2}	Area / mi^{2}	Year removed	See also
Alaska	Granted statehood (full integration with the United States)	US state	United States	683,478	1,700,130	656,424	1959	Alaskan Independence Party
Cocos (Keeling) Islands	Voted to integrate into Australia	External territory of Australia	Australia	596	14	5	1984	Shire of Cocos
Cook Islands	Gained self-rule	State in free association with New Zealand	New Zealand	12,271	237	92	1965	Politics of the Cook Islands
French Guiana	Became an overseas department (full integration with the French Republic)	Overseas department and region of France	France	209,000	83,534	32,253	1947	Politics of French Guiana
French Polynesia (later reinstated) (Note: The United Nations General Assembly voted to reinstate French Polynesia (former French Establishments in Oceania) to the list by General Assembly Resolution A/67/265 on 18 May 2013.)	Became an overseas territory (semi-autonomous collectivity of the French Republic)	Overseas country of France: French Polynesia Overseas state private property of France: Clipperton Island	France	298,256	4,441	1,715	1947	Politics of French Polynesia
Greenland	Incorporated into Denmark as Greenland County (1953). Gained home rule as a Country within the Kingdom of Denmark (1979). Increased autonomy (2009)	Autonomous country within the Kingdom of Denmark	Denmark	57,564	2,166,086	836,330	1954	Politics of Greenland
Guadeloupe	Became an overseas department (full integration with the French Republic)	Overseas department and region of France: Guadeloupe Overseas collectivities of France: Saint Barthélemy; Saint Martin	France	408,000	1,628	629	1947	Politics of Guadeloupe, Saint Barthélemy, and Saint Martin
Hawaii	Granted statehood (full integration with the United States)	US state	United States	1,283,388	28,311	10,931	1959	Legal status of Hawaii
Hong Kong	Removed from the list on request of the People's Republic of China (which had replaced the Republic of China at the UN in 1971)	Special Administrative Region of the People's Republic of China (since 1 July 1997): Hong Kong	United Kingdom	7,018,636	1,092	422	1972	Politics of Hong Kong
Macau	Removed from the list on request of the People's Republic of China	Special Administrative Region of the People's Republic of China (since 20 December 1999): Macau	Portugal	545,674	28	11	1972	Politics of Macau
Martinique	Became an overseas department (full integration with the French Republic)	Overseas department and region of France	France	401,000	1,128	436	1947	Politics of Martinique
Netherlands Antilles	Granted more autonomy (dissolved on 10 October 2010)	Constituent countries of the Kingdom of the Netherlands: Aruba; Curaçao; Sint Maarten Special municipalities of the Netherlands: Bonaire; Sint Eustatius; Saba	Netherlands	225,369	960	371	1955	Politics of Aruba; Curaçao; Sint Maarten the Netherlands Antilles
New Caledonia (later reinstated) (Note: New Caledonia was reinstated on the list in 1986 by the General Assembly Resolution No. A/RES/41/41 of the Implementation of the Declaration on the Granting of Independence to Colonial Countries and Peoples)	Became an overseas territory (semi-autonomous collectivity of the French Republic)	Sui generis collectivity of France Overseas collectivity of France: Wallis and Futuna	France	224,824	19,060	7,359	1947	Politics of New Caledonia; Politics of Wallis and Futuna
Niue	Gained self-rule	State in free association with New Zealand	New Zealand	1,444	260	100	1974	Politics of Niue
Northern Mariana Islands	Became a Commonwealth	Unincorporated territory of the United States with Commonwealth status	United States	53,883	168	65	1990	Politics of the Northern Mariana Islands
Panama Canal Zone	Removed from the list on request of Panama	Part of Colón, Panamá, and Panamá Oeste provinces of Panama (since 1 October 1979)	United States				1947	Politics of Panama
Puerto Rico	Became a Commonwealth (semi-autonomous unincorporated territory of the United States)	Unincorporated territory of the United States with Commonwealth status	United States	3,958,128	8,870	3,420	1952	Political status of Puerto Rico
Réunion	Became an overseas department (full integration with the French Republic)	Overseas department and region of France	France	868,000	2,512	970	1947	Politics of Réunion
Saint Pierre and Miquelon	Became an overseas department and then an overseas territory (semi-autonomous collectivity of the French Republic)	Overseas collectivity of France	France	7,044	242	93	1947	Politics of Saint Pierre and Miquelon
Suriname	Granted more autonomy (became independent in 1975)	Independent as Suriname	Netherlands	475,996	163,270	63,039	1955	Politics of Suriname

=== Joined another state ===
Overview of non-self-governing territories that joined another state
Non-self-governing territory	State joined	Current status	Administering power	Population	Area		Year removed	See also
Non-self-governing territory	State joined	Current status	Administering power	Population	km^{2}	mi^{2}	Year removed	See also
British Cameroons	Northern Cameroons joined Nigeria; Southern Cameroons joined Cameroon	Adamawa, Borno and Taraba states of Nigeria, Northwest and Southwest regions of Cameroon	United Kingdom				1961	Politics of Nigeria; Politics of Cameroon; Anglophone Crisis
(Spain) Ifni	Integrated into Morocco	Sidi Ifni, Guelmim-Oued Noun, Morocco	Spain	51,517	1,502	580	1969	Politics of Morocco
Portuguese India	Annexed by India	The Indian state of Goa and the union territory of Dadra and Nagar Haveli and Daman and Diu	Portugal				1961	Annexation of Goa; Annexation of Dadra and Nagar Haveli
(France) French India	Integrated into India	Puducherry union territory and Chandannagar of West Bengal state of India	France	973,829	492	190	1947	Coup d'état of Yanaon
Netherlands New Guinea	Integrated into Indonesia	Papuan provinces of Indonesia	Netherlands		420,540	162,370	1963	Act of Free Choice; Papua Conflict
North Borneo	Joined with Malaya to form Malaysia	Malaysian state of Sabah and the federal territory of Labuan	United Kingdom	285,000	76,115	29,388	1963	Malaysia Agreement
(Portugal) São João Batista de Ajuda	Integrated into the Republic of Dahomey (now Benin)	Ouidah commune, Atlantique department, Benin	Portugal				1961	Politics of Benin
Sarawak	Joined with Malaya to form Malaysia	Malaysian state of Sarawak	United Kingdom	546,385	124,450	48,050	1963	Malaysia Agreement
Singapore	Joined with Malaya to form Malaysia	Independent as Singapore External territories of Australia: Christmas Island; Cocos (Keeling) Islands	United Kingdom	4,608,167	693	268	1963	Malaysia Agreement; State of Singapore (Malaysia)
(United Kingdom) British Togoland	Joined British Gold Coast colony	Volta, Northern, Oti, North East and Upper East regions of Ghana	United Kingdom				1957	Foreign relations of Ghana; Western Togoland Rebellion

=== Independence ===
Overview of non-self-governing territories that gained independence
Non-self-governing territory	Sub-unit	Independent as	Administering power	Population	Area		Year removed	Notes
Non-self-governing territory	Sub-unit	Independent as	Administering power	Population	km^{2}	mi^{2}	Year removed	Notes
(Portuguese Angola) Angola		Angola	Portugal	7,024,000	1,246,700	481,400	1975	Including the enclave of Cabinda
Bahamas		The Bahamas	United Kingdom		13,878	5,358	1973	
Barbados		Barbados	United Kingdom		431	166	1966	
Basutoland		Lesotho	United Kingdom		30,355	11,720	1966	
(Bechuanaland Protectorate) Bechuanaland		Botswana	United Kingdom				1966	
Brunei		Brunei	United Kingdom	5,765	2,220	860	1984	
French Cameroon		Cameroon	France				1960	Trust Territory
(Portuguese Cape Verde) Cape Verde		Cape Verde	Portugal		4,033	1,557	1975	
Belgian Congo		(Democratic Republic of the Congo) Congo-Léopoldville	Belgium	16,610,000	2,344,858	905,355	1960	Now generally referred to as the Democratic Republic of the Congo
Cyprus		Cyprus	United Kingdom		9,251	3,572	1960	Parts of Cyprus are controlled by the partially recognised state of Northern Cyprus
Dutch East Indies		Indonesia (excluding Western New Guinea)	Netherlands				1950	Listed as Netherlands Indies on the United Nations
East Timor		East Timor	Portugal		15,007	5,794	2002	Portuguese Timor de facto ceased to exist from 1975 after becoming independent before an invasion by Indonesia but continued to exist de-jure until 2002
French Equatorial Africa	(French Chad) Chad	Chad	France				1960	
French Equatorial Africa	(French Congo) Middle Congo	Congo-Brazzaville	France				1960	Now generally referred to as the Republic of the Congo
French Equatorial Africa	French Gabon	Gabon	France				1960	
French Equatorial Africa	(French Equatorial Africa) Ubangi-Shari	Central African Republic	France				1960	
Fiji		Fiji	United Kingdom				1970	
Gambia		The Gambia	United Kingdom		10,380	4,010	1965	
Gilbert and Ellice Islands	(Gilbert and Ellice Islands) Gilbert Islands	Kiribati	United Kingdom				1979	
Gilbert and Ellice Islands	(Gilbert and Ellice Islands) Ellice Islands	Tuvalu	United Kingdom				1978	
Gold Coast		Ghana	United Kingdom				1957	
British Guiana		Guyana	United Kingdom				1966	
Portuguese Guinea		Guinea-Bissau	Portugal		36,125	13,948	1974	
Spanish Guinea		Equatorial Guinea	Spain		28,051	10,831	1968	Listed as Fernando Póo and Río Muni on the United Nations
British Honduras		Belize	United Kingdom	145,000	22,966	8,867	1981	
French Indochina	Cambodia	Cambodia	France				1948	Gained full independence in 1953
French Indochina	Laos	Laos	France				1949	Gained full independence in 1953
French Indochina	(Tonkin (French protectorate)) Tonkin	(North Vietnam) Democratic Republic of Vietnam	France				1948	Reunified in 1976, de facto independent from 1945, Vietnam is not listed as being divided on the United Nations
French Indochina	(Annam (French protectorate)) Annam (part)	(North Vietnam) Democratic Republic of Vietnam	France				1948	Reunified in 1976, de facto independent from 1945, Vietnam is not listed as being divided on the United Nations
French Indochina	(French Cochinchina) Cochinchina	(South Vietnam) State of Vietnam	France				1948	Reunified in 1976, gained full independence in 1954, Vietnam is not listed as being divided on the United Nations
French Indochina	(Annam (French protectorate)) Annam (part)	(South Vietnam) State of Vietnam	France				1948	Reunified in 1976, gained full independence in 1954, Vietnam is not listed as being divided on the United Nations
Jamaica		Jamaica	United Kingdom		11,100	4,300	1962	
Kenya		Kenya	United Kingdom				1963	
British Leeward Islands	Antigua	Antigua and Barbuda	United Kingdom				1981	The British Leeward Islands ceased to exist as an entity in 1958
British Leeward Islands	Saint Christopher-Nevis-Anguilla	St. Kitts and Nevis	United Kingdom				1983	The British Leeward Islands ceased to exist as an entity in 1958, Anguilla was separated from Saint Christoper in 1971 and remains a non-self-governing territory
(French Madagascar) Madagascar		Comoros	France				1975	Mayotte has continued to be part of France since 1975 however is still claimed by Comoros with the United Nations supporting its claim until at least 1995
(French Madagascar) Madagascar		Madagascar	France				1960	
(Malayan Union) Malaya		Malaya	United Kingdom	132,364	51,106	19,732	1957	Later became Malaysia
Malta		Malta	United Kingdom		316	122	1964	
Mauritius		Mauritius	United Kingdom		2,040	790	1968	The current British Indian Ocean Territory was separated from British Mauritius in 1965 but is still claimed by Mauritius with the United Nations supporting its claim
French protectorate of Morocco Spanish protectorate of Morocco		Morocco	France; Spain				1956	Morocco is solely listed as French on the United Nations, parts of Ifni were ceded in 1958 while Cape Juby was ceded in 1959, these were also not listed separately unlike the remainder of Ifni
(Portuguese Mozambique) Mozambique		Mozambique	Portugal	7,300,000	784,955	303,073	1975	
Nauru		Nauru	Australia		21	8.1	1968	
New Hebrides		Vanuatu	(United Kingdom) (France) Anglo-French Condominium	100,000	12,189	4,706	1980	
Nigeria		Nigeria	United Kingdom				1960	
Northern Rhodesia		Zambia	United Kingdom	3,545,200	752,618	290,587	1964	
Nyasaland		Malawi	United Kingdom		752,618	290,587	1964	
Trust Territory of the Pacific Islands		Marshall Islands	United States	68,000	180	69	1990	Independent state in free association with the United States
Trust Territory of the Pacific Islands		Federated States of Micronesia	United States	111,000	702	271	1990	Independent state in free association with the United States
Trust Territory of the Pacific Islands		Palau	United States	20,956	459	177	1994	Independent state in free association with the United States
Papua and New Guinea		Papua New Guinea	Australia				1975	
(Belgium) Ruanda-Urundi		Burundi	Belgium				1962	Trust territory
(Belgium) Ruanda-Urundi		Rwanda	Belgium				1962	Trust territory
(Portugal) São Tomé and Príncipe		São Tomé and Príncipe	Portugal		1,001	386	1975	
Seychelles		Seychelles	United Kingdom		451	174	1976	
Sierra Leone		Sierra Leone	United Kingdom		71,740	27,700	1961	
Solomon Islands		Solomon Islands	United Kingdom		28,896	11,157	1978	
British Somaliland		State of Somaliland	United Kingdom				1960	Joined the Trust Territory of Somalia within a week to form the Somali Republic, most of the territory is currently under the control of the partially recognised state of Somaliland
French Somaliland		Djibouti	France	200,000	23,200	9,000	1977	Was called the Territory of the Afars and Issas from 1967
Trust Territory of Somaliland		Somalia	Italy				1960	Joined the State of Somaliland to form the Somali Republic
(South Africa) South West Africa		Namibia	South Africa	2,088,669	825,418	318,696	1968/1990	League of Nations Mandate territory, illegally terminated in 1968 but South Africa remained in control of the territory until 1990, both years listed by the United Nations
Federation of South Arabia (United Kingdom) Protectorate of South Arabia		South Yemen	United Kingdom		285,192	110,113	1967	Unified with North Yemen in 1990, listed as Aden on the United Nations
Southern Rhodesia		Zimbabwe	United Kingdom	6,930,000	390,580	150,800	1980	De facto independent as the unrecognised state of Rhodesia and Zimbabwe Rhodesia between 1965 and 1979
(United Kingdom) Swaziland		Swaziland	United Kingdom		17,364	6,704	1968	Now called Eswatini
Tanganyika		Tanganyika	United Kingdom				1961	Trust Territory. Later joined with the People's Republic of Zanzibar to form the United Republic of Tanganyika and Zanzibar, now Tanzania
(Togo) French Togoland		Togo	France				1960	Trust Territory
Trinidad and Tobago		Trinidad and Tobago	United Kingdom		5,128	1,980	1962	
Tunisia		Tunisia	France		163,610	63,170	1956	
Uganda Protectorate		Uganda	United Kingdom				1962	
French West Africa	(French West Africa) Dahomey	Dahomey	France				1960	Now called Benin
French West Africa	(French West Africa) French Guinea	Guinea	France				1958	
French West Africa	(French West Africa) Ivory Coast	Ivory Coast	France				1960	
French West Africa	Mali Federation	Mali Federation	France				1960	Split into the countries of Mali and Senegal two months after independence, both are listed separately on the United Nations
French West Africa	(French West Africa) Mauritania	Mauritania	France				1960	
French West Africa	(France) Niger	Niger	France				1960	
French West Africa	(France) Upper Volta	Upper Volta	France				1960	Now called Burkina Faso
Western Samoa		Western Samoa	New Zealand				1962	Trust territory, now called Samoa
British Windward Islands		Dominica	United Kingdom				1978	The British Windward Islands ceased to exist as an entity in 1958
British Windward Islands		Grenada	United Kingdom				1974	The British Windward Islands ceased to exist as an entity in 1958
British Windward Islands		St. Lucia	United Kingdom				1979	The British Windward Islands ceased to exist as an entity in 1958
British Windward Islands		St. Vincent and the Grenadines	United Kingdom				1979	The British Windward Islands ceased to exist as an entity in 1958
(Sultanate of Zanzibar) Zanzibar		Kenya	United Kingdom				1963	The Dominion of Kenya was formed by the unification of the Colony of Kenya and the Protectorate of Kenya; the protectorate, a ten-mile-wide (16 km) coastal strip (Mwambao), had been under Zanzibari sovereignty and administered by the UK
(Sultanate of Zanzibar) Zanzibar		Zanzibar	United Kingdom		2,643	1,020	1963	The British protectorate over the Sultanate of Zanzibar was terminated in 1963 and the state was admitted to the UN; in 1964, the sultan was deposed and the People's Republic of Zanzibar was proclaimed; later that year, it joined with the Republic of Tanganyika to form the United Republic of Tanganyika and Zanzibar, now Tanzania

== Disputes ==
The list remains controversial in some countries for various reasons:

=== Referendums ===
One reason for controversy is that the list includes some dependencies that have democratically chosen to maintain their current status, or have had a referendum in which local government requirements were not met regarding the number of votes required to support a change of status or the number of voters participating (e.g., in the United States Virgin Islands).

==== Falkland Islands ====
The Falkland Islands is a British Overseas Territory that is claimed by Argentina.

==== Gibraltar ====
Gibraltar is largely a self-governing British territory on the tip of the Iberian Peninsula with a population of about 30,000 people, whose territory is claimed by Spain. It continues to be listed as an NSGT though its residents expressed a preference in two referendums to retain the status quo. In 1967, they were asked whether to retain their current status or to become part of Spain. The status quo was favoured by 12,138 votes to 44. In 2002, a proposal for a joint British–Spanish administration of the territory was voted down by 17,900 votes to 187. (The "no" vote accounted for more than 85% of Gibraltar's entire electorate). The United Nations did not recognise either referendum, with the 1967 referendum being declared in contravention of previous UN resolutions. The Spanish government does not recognize any right of the current Gibraltar inhabitants to self-determination, on the grounds that they are not the original population of the territory, but residents transferred by the colonial power, the United Kingdom.

==== Tokelau ====
The territory of Tokelau divides political opinion in New Zealand. In response to attempts at decolonizing Tokelau, New Zealand journalist Michael Field wrote in 2004: "The UN ... is anxious to rid the world of the last remaining vestiges of colonialism by the end of the decade. It has a list of 16 territories around the world, virtually none of which wants to be independent to any degree." Field further notes that Patuki Isaako, who was head of Tokelau's government at the time of a UN seminar on decolonization in 2004, informed the United Nations that his country had no wish to be decolonized, and that Tokelauans had opposed the idea of decolonization ever since the first visit by UN officials in 1976.

In 2006, a UN-supervised referendum on decolonization was held in Tokelau, where 60.07% of voters supported the offer of self-government. However, the terms of the referendum required a two-thirds majority to vote in favor of self-government. A second referendum was held in 2007, in which 64.40% of Tokelauans supported self-government, falling short of the two-thirds majority by 16 votes. This led New Zealand politician and former diplomat John Hayes, on behalf of the National Party, to state that "Tokelau did the right thing to resist pressure from [the New Zealand government] and the United Nations to pursue self-government". In May 2008, the United Nations' Secretary General Ban Ki-moon called the international community "to complete the decolonization process in every one of the remaining 16 Non-Self-Governing Territories". This led the New Zealand Herald to comment that the United Nations was "apparently frustrated by two failed attempts to get Tokelau to vote for independence from New Zealand".

=== Viability ===
A lack of population and landmass is an issue for at least one territory included on the list: the British overseas territory Pitcairn Islands, which has a population of less than 50 descended primarily from indigenous Polynesians and mutineers from HMS Bounty. Regardless, the territory's colonial status was disputed during the 2004 sexual assault trial where the seven defendants – comprising a third of the adult male population – unsuccessfully argued that the islanders had rejected British control ever since the 1789 mutiny and, as a result, British criminal law did not apply to them. Four other territories – Tokelau, Montserrat, the Falkland Islands and Saint Helena – are also less populous than any current UN member state.

In addition, some territories are financially dependent on their administering power.

=== Completely autonomous dependencies ===
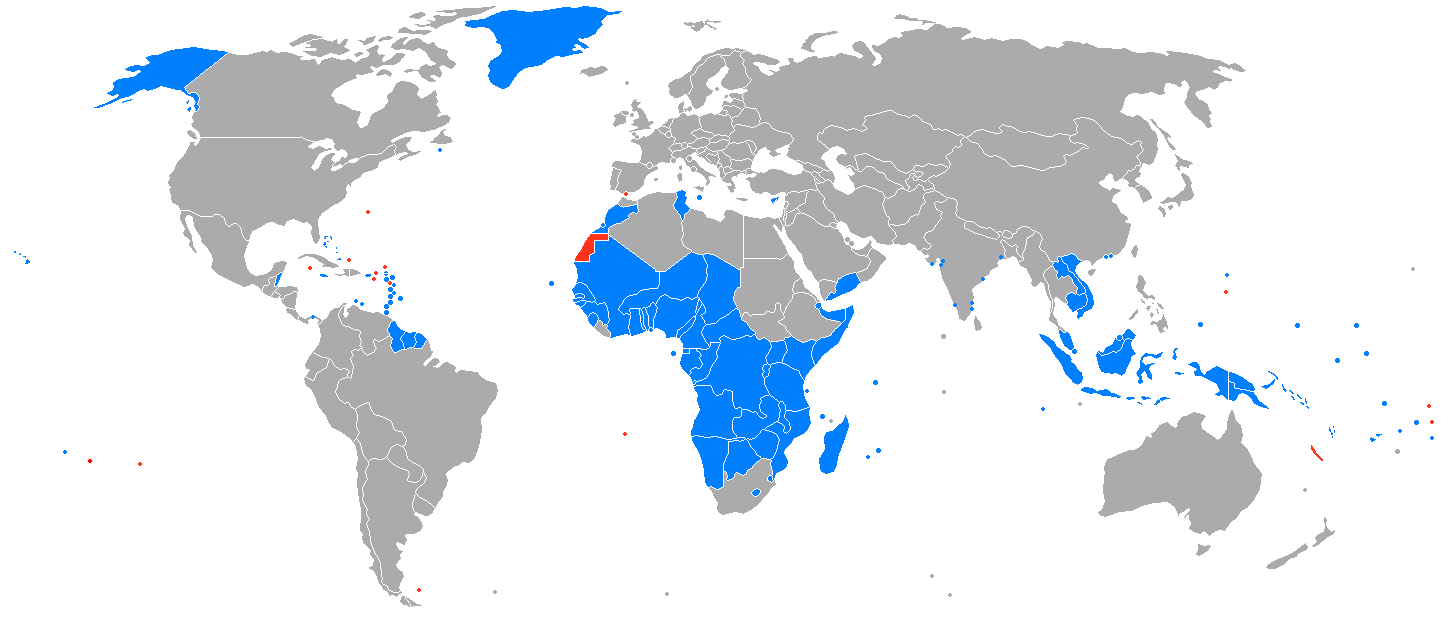
Currently listed territories Formerly listed territories

Another criticism is that a number of the listed territories, such as Bermuda (see Politics of Bermuda), the Falkland Islands and Gibraltar, consider themselves completely autonomous and self-governing, with the "administering power" retaining limited oversight over matters such as defence and diplomacy. In past years, there were ongoing disputes between some administering powers and the Decolonization Committee over whether territories such as pre-independence Brunei and the West Indies Associated States should still be considered "non-self-governing", particularly in instances where the administering power was prepared to grant full independence whenever the territory requested it. These disputes became moot as those territories eventually received full independence.

=== Removed under other circumstances ===
Territories that have achieved a status described by the administering powers as internally self-governing – such as Puerto Rico, the Netherlands Antilles, and the Cook Islands – have been removed from the list by vote of the General Assembly, often under pressure of the administering powers.

Some territories that have been annexed and incorporated into the legal framework of the controlling state (such as the overseas regions of France, and the US states of Alaska and Hawaii) are considered by the UN to have been decolonized, since they then no longer constitute "non-self-governing" entities; their populations are assumed to have agreed to merge with the former parent state. However, in 1961, the General Assembly voted to end this treatment for the "overseas provinces" of Portugal such as Angola and Mozambique, which were active focus of United Nations attention until they attained independence in the mid-1970s.

Territories have also been removed for other reasons. In 1972, for example, Hong Kong (then administered by the United Kingdom) and Macau (then administered by Portugal) were removed from the list at the request of the People's Republic of China, which had just been recognized as holding China's seat at the United Nations. This was due to the PRC's belief that their presence on the list implied eventual independence of the territory, instead of their status being handled by bilateral negotiations.

=== Change of status ===
On 2 December 1986, New Caledonia, an overseas territory of France, was reinstated on the list of non-self-governing territories, an action to which France objected. Within France it has had the status of a collectivité sui generis, or a one-of-a-kind community, since 1999. Under the 1998 Nouméa Accord, its Territorial Congress had the right to call for three referendums on independence between 2014 and 2018. The first referendum was held on 4 November 2018 (56.4% against independence), the second referendum on 4 October 2020 (53.26% against independence), and the third referendum on 12 December 2021 (96.50% against independence). While in all three the independence was rejected, the result of the third referendum stems from the boycott by the pro-independence Kanak community in the context of the COVID-19 pandemic in New Caledonia.

French Polynesia was also reinstated on the list on 17 May 2013, in somewhat contentious circumstances. Having been re-elected President of French Polynesia in 2011 (leader of local government), Oscar Temaru asked for it to be re-inscribed on the list; it had been removed in 1947. (French Polynesia is categorised by France as an overseas country, in recognition of its self-governing status.) During the year 2012, Oscar Temaru engaged in intense lobbying with the micro-states of Oceania, many of which, the Solomon Islands, Nauru and Tuvalu, submitted to the UN General Assembly a draft of a resolution to affirm "the inalienable right of the population of French Polynesia to self-determination and independence".

On 5 May 2013, Temaru's Union for Democracy party lost the legislative election to Gaston Flosse's pro-autonomy but anti-independence Tahoera'a Huiraatira party; obtaining only 11 seats against the party of Gaston Flosse, with 38 seats, and the autonomist party A Ti'a Porinetia with 8 seats.

At this stage, the United Nations General Assembly was due to discuss French Polynesia's re-inscription on the list twelve days later, in accordance with a motion tabled by Solomon Islands, Tuvalu and Nauru. On 16 May, the Assembly of French Polynesia, with its new anti-independence majority, adopted a motion asking the United Nations not to restore the country to the list. On 17 May, despite French Polynesia's and France's opposition, the country was restored to the list of non-self-governing territories. Temaru was present for the vote, on the final day of his mandate as president. The United Nations affirmed "the inalienable right of the people of French Polynesia to self-determination and independence".

A few hours before the UN review of the resolution, during its first meeting, the new Territorial Assembly adopted by 46 votes to 10 a "resolution" expressing the desire of Polynesians to maintain their autonomy within the French Republic. In spite of this resolution adopted by the parties representing 70% of the Polynesian voters, the UN General Assembly inscribed French Polynesia on the list of the territories to be decolonized during its plenary assembly of 17 May 2013. France did not take part in this session while the United States, Germany, the Netherlands and the United Kingdom disassociated themselves from this resolution.

=== List not complete ===
Also controversial are the criteria set down in 1960 to 1961 by the United Nations General Assembly Resolution 1514 (XV), United Nations General Assembly Resolution 1541 (XV), Principle 12 of the Annex, and United Nations General Assembly Resolution 1654 (XVI) which only focused on colonies of the Western world, namely Australia, Belgium, Denmark, France, Italy, Netherlands, New Zealand, Portugal, South Africa, Spain, the United Kingdom, and the United States. This list of administering powers was not expanded afterwards.

Nevertheless, some of the 111 members who joined the UN after 1960 gained independence from countries not covered by Resolution 1541 and were themselves not classified as "Non-Self-Governing Territories" by the UN. Of these that joined the UN between 1960 and 2008, 11 were independent before 1960 and 71 were included on the list (some as a group). Twenty new UN countries resulted from breakup of Second World states and of Yugoslavia: six were part of Yugoslavia, two were part of Czechoslovakia, and 12 were part of the Soviet Union (Ukraine and Belarus already had UN seats before the dissolution of the USSR, whose seat was reused by the Russian Federation without acceding anew). Out of the other ten, seven (mostly Arab) were colonies or protectorates of the "Western" countries, and one each was a non-self-governing part of Ethiopia (later independent Eritrea), Pakistan (East Pakistan, later independent Bangladesh) and Sudan (later independent South Sudan). Also, the Baltic states (Estonia, Latvia and Lithuania), which considered themselves illegally occupied by the Soviet Union, were not on the list either. Western New Guinea (also known as West Papua), which was ceded to Indonesia, is also not on the list as well as Sarawak and Sabah, which were handed to Malaya during its territorial expansion through the formation of Malaysia in 1963. In 2018, the government of Vanuatu started seeking international support to have West Papua added to the list in 2019.

After the revocation of Norfolk Island's self-governing status by the Australian government in 2015, an island community group requested the UN add the island to the list of non-self-governing territories.

== See also ==
- Colony
- Autonomous administrative division
- Dependent territory
- Independence referendum
- List of active separatist movements recognized by intergovernmental organizations
- List of sovereign states
- List of states with limited recognition
- List of territories governed by the United Nations
- Lists of active separatist movements
- Timeline of national independence
- United Nations General Assembly Resolution 1514 (XV)
- United Nations General Assembly Resolution 1541 (XV)
- United Nations General Assembly Resolution 1654 (XVI)
- United Nations trust territories
- Unrepresented Nations and Peoples Organization
- Captive Nations
