= International Covenant on Civil and Political Rights =

Treaty adopted by United Nations General Assembly in 1966

- Parties and signatories of the ICCPR State party Signatory that has not ratified State party that attempted to withdraw Non-party; non-signatory
- Type: United Nations General Assembly resolution
- Drafted: 1954
- Signed: 16 December 1966
- Location: United Nations Headquarters, New York City
- Effective: 23 March 1976
- Signatories: 74
- Parties: 175
- Depositary: Secretary-General of the United Nations
- Languages: French, English, Russian, Chinese and Spanish (authentic texts pursuant to Article 53 of the Covenant), as well as Arabic (official text adopted by the UN General Assembly)

Full text at Wikisource
- International Covenant on Civil and Political Rights

The International Covenant on Civil and Political Rights (ICCPR) is a multilateral treaty that commits nations to respect individuals' civil and political rights, including the right to life, freedom of religion, freedom of speech, freedom of assembly, electoral rights and rights to due process and a fair trial. The United Nations General Assembly adopted it by Resolution 2200A (XXI) on 16 December 1966, and it entered into force on 23 March 1976 after its thirty-fifth ratification or accession. (Note: Article 49 allowed that the covenant would enter into force three months after the date of the deposit of the thirty-fifth instrument of ratification or accession) As of December 2025, the Covenant has 175 parties and six more signatories without ratification, most notably China and Cuba; North Korea is the only state that has tried to withdraw.

The ICCPR is considered a pivotal document in the history of international law and human rights, forming part of the International Bill of Human Rights, along with the International Covenant on Economic, Social and Cultural Rights (ICESCR) and the Universal Declaration of Human Rights (UDHR).

The United Nations Human Rights Committee monitors compliance with the treaty; (Note: Not to be confused with the United Nations Human Rights Council.) it reviews regular reports from State Parties on how they implement the rights. States must report one year after acceding to the Covenant, and then whenever the Committee requests (usually every four years). The Committee normally meets at the UN Office at Geneva, Switzerland, and typically holds three sessions per year.

== History ==
International Covenant on Civil and Political Rights

The ICCPR (International Covenant On Civil and Political Rights) has its roots in the same process that led to the Universal Declaration of Human Rights. A "Declaration on the Essential Rights of Man" had been proposed at the 1945 San Francisco Conference which led to the founding of the United Nations, and the Economic and Social Council was given the task of drafting it. Early on in the process, the document was split into a declaration setting forth general principles of human rights, and a convention or covenant containing binding commitments. The former evolved into the UDHR and was adopted on 10 December 1948.

Drafting continued on the convention, but there remained significant differences between UN members on the relative importance of negative Civil and Political versus positive Economic, Social and Cultural Rights. These eventually caused the convention to be split into two separate covenants, "one to contain civil and political rights and the other to contain economic, social and cultural rights". The two covenants were to contain as many similar provisions as possible, and be opened for signature simultaneously. Each would also contain an article on the right of all peoples to self-determination.

The first document became the International Covenant on Civil and Political Rights and the second the International Covenant on Economic, Social and Cultural Rights. The drafts were presented to the UN General Assembly for discussion in 1954 and adopted in 1966. As a result of diplomatic negotiations the International Covenant on Economic, Social and Cultural Rights was adopted shortly before the International Covenant on Civil and Political Rights. Together, the UDHR and the two Covenants are considered to be the foundational human rights texts in the contemporary international system of human rights.

== Articles of the Covenant ==
The Covenant follows the structure of the UDHR and ICESCR, with a preamble and fifty-three articles, divided into six parts.

Part 1 (Article 1) recognizes the right of all peoples to self-determination, including the right to "freely determine their political status", pursue their economic, social and cultural goals, and manage and dispose of their own resources. It recognises a negative right of a people not to be deprived of its means of subsistence, and imposes an obligation on those parties still responsible for non-self governing and trust territories (colonies) to encourage and respect their self-determination.

Part 2 (Articles 2–5) obliges parties to legislate where necessary to give effect to the rights recognised in the Covenant, and to provide an effective legal remedy for any violation of those rights. It also requires the rights be recognised "without distinction of any kind, such as race, colour, sex, language, religion, political or other opinion, national or social origin, property, birth or other status", and to ensure that they are enjoyed equally by women. The rights can only be limited "in time of public emergency which threatens the life of the nation", and even then no derogation is permitted from the rights to life, freedom from torture and slavery, the freedom from retrospective law, the right to personhood, and freedom of thought, conscience, religion and freedom from medical or scientific experimentation without consent.

Part 3 (Articles 6 – 27) lists the rights themselves. These include rights to:

- physical integrity, in the form of the right to life and freedom from torture and slavery (Articles 6, 7, and 8);
- liberty and security of the person, in the form of freedom from arbitrary arrest and detention and the right to habeas corpus (Articles 9 – 11);
- procedural fairness in law, in the form of rights to due process, a fair and impartial trial, the presumption of innocence, and recognition as a person before the law (Articles 14, 15, and 16);
- individual liberty, in the form of the freedoms of movement, thought, conscience and religion, speech, association and assembly, family rights, the right to a nationality, and the right to privacy (Articles 12, 13, 17–24);
- prohibition by law of any propaganda for war as well as any advocacy of national or religious hatred that constitutes incitement to discrimination, hostility or violence (Article 20);
- political participation, including the right to the right to vote (Article 25);
- Non-discrimination, minority rights and equality before the law (Articles 26 and 27).

Many of these rights include specific actions which must be undertaken to realize them.

Part 4 (Articles 28–45) governs the establishment and operation of the Human Rights Committee and the reporting and monitoring of the Covenant. It also allows parties to recognize the competence of the committee to resolve disputes between parties on the implementation of the Covenant (Articles 41 and 42).

Part 5 (Articles 46–47) clarifies that the Covenant shall not be interpreted as interfering with the operation of the United Nations or "the inherent right of all peoples to enjoy and utilize fully and freely their natural wealth and resources".

Part 6 (Articles 48–53) governs ratification, entry into force, and amendment of the Covenant.

=== Rights to physical integrity ===
Article 6 of the Covenant recognises the individual's "inherent right to life" and requires it to be protected by law. It is a "supreme right" from which no derogation can be permitted, and must be interpreted widely. It therefore requires parties to take positive measures to reduce infant mortality and increase life expectancy, as well as forbidding arbitrary killings by security forces.

While Article 6 does not prohibit the death penalty, it restricts its application to the "most serious crimes" and forbids it to be used on children and pregnant women or in a manner contrary to the Convention on the Prevention and Punishment of the Crime of Genocide. The UN Human Rights Committee interprets the Article as "strongly suggest[ing] that abolition is desirable", and regards any progress towards abolition of the death penalty as advancing this right. The Second Optional Protocol commits its signatories to the abolition of the death penalty within their borders.

Article 7 prohibits torture, cruel, inhuman or degrading punishment and non-consensual medical or scientific experimentation. As with Article 6, it cannot be derogated from under any circumstances. The article is now interpreted to impose similar obligations to those required by the United Nations Convention Against Torture, including not just prohibition of torture, but active measures to prevent its use and a prohibition on refoulement. In response to Nazi human experimentation during WW2 this article explicitly includes a prohibition on medical and scientific experimentation without consent.

Article 8 prohibits slavery and enforced servitude in all situations. The article also prohibits forced labour, with exceptions for criminal punishment, military service and civil obligations.

=== Liberty and security of person ===
Article 9 recognises the rights to liberty and security of the person. It prohibits arbitrary arrest and detention, requires any deprivation of liberty to be according to law, and obliges parties to allow those deprived of their liberty to challenge their imprisonment through the courts. These provisions apply not just to those imprisoned as part of the criminal process, but also to those detained due to mental illness, drug addiction, or for educational or immigration purposes.

Articles 9.3 and 9.4 impose procedural safeguards around arrest, requiring anyone arrested to be promptly informed of the charges against them, and to be brought promptly before a judge. It also restricts the use of pre-trial detention, requiring that it not be 'the general rule'.

Article 10 requires anyone deprived of liberty to be treated with dignity and humanity. This applies not just to prisoners, but also to those detained for immigration purposes or psychiatric care. The right complements the Article 7 prohibition on torture and cruel, inhuman or degrading treatment. The article also imposes specific obligations around criminal justice, requiring prisoners in pretrial detention to be separated from convicted prisoners, and children to be separated from adults. It requires prisons to be focused on reform and rehabilitation rather than punishment.

Article 11 prohibits the use of imprisonment as a punishment for breach of contract.

=== Procedural fairness and rights of the accused ===
Article 14 recognizes and protects a right to justice and a fair trial. Article 14.1 establishes the ground rules: everyone must be equal before the courts, and any hearing must take place in open court before a competent, independent and impartial tribunal, with any judgment or ruling made public. Closed hearings are only permitted for reasons of privacy, justice, or national security, and judgments may only be suppressed in divorce cases or to protect the interests of children. These obligations apply to both criminal and civil hearings, and to all courts and tribunals. Article 14.3 mandates that litigants must be informed promptly and in detail in a language which they understand.

The rest of the article imposes specific and detailed obligations around the process of criminal trials in order to protect the rights of the accused and the right to a fair trial. It establishes the presumption of innocence and forbids double jeopardy. It requires that those convicted of a crime be allowed to appeal to a higher tribunal, and requires victims of a miscarriage of justice to be compensated. It establishes rights to a speedy trial, to counsel, against self-incrimination, and for the accused to be present and call and examine witnesses (cf. the Confrontation Clause of the US constitution).

Article 15 prohibits prosecutions under ex post facto law and the imposition of retrospective criminal penalties, and requires the imposition of the lesser penalty where criminal sentences have changed between the offence and conviction. One exception is criminal proceedings held for violations of peremptory norms (jus cogens) under customary international law, such as genocide, slavery, torture, and wars of aggression.

Article 16 requires states to recognize everyone as a person before the law.

=== Individual liberties ===
Article 12 guarantees freedom of movement, including the right of persons to choose their residence, to leave and return to a country. These rights apply to legal aliens as well as citizens of a state, and can be restricted only where necessary to protect national security, public order or health, and the rights and freedoms of others. The article also recognises a right of people to enter their own country: the right of return. The Human Rights Committee interprets this right broadly as applying not just to citizens, but also to those stripped of or denied their nationality. They also regard it as near-absolute; "there are few, if any, circumstances in which deprivation of the right to enter one's own country could be reasonable".

Article 13 forbids the arbitrary expulsion of resident aliens and requires such decisions to be able to be appealed and reviewed.

Article 17 mandates the right of privacy. This provision, specifically article 17(1), protects private adult consensual sexual activity, thereby nullifying prohibitions on homosexual behaviour; however, the wording of this covenant's marriage right (Article 23) excludes the extrapolation of a same-sex marriage right from this provision. Article 17 also protects people against unlawful attacks to their honor and reputation. Article 17 (2) grants the protection of the law against such attacks.

Article 18 mandates freedom of religion or belief.

Article 19 mandates freedom of expression.

Article 20 mandates sanctions against inciting war and hatred.

Article 21 mandates freedom of assembly and 22 mandates freedom of association. These provisions guarantee the right to freedom of association, the right to trade unions, and also defines the International Labour Organization.

Article 23 mandates the right of marriage. The wording of this provision neither requires nor prohibits same-sex marriage.

Article 24 mandates special protection, the right to a name, and the right to a nationality for every child.

Article 27 mandates the rights of ethnic, religious and linguistic minorities to enjoy their own culture, to profess their own religion, and to use their own language.

=== Political rights ===
Articles 2 and 3 provide an accessory non-discrimination principle: accessory in the way that it cannot be used independently and can only be relied upon in relation to another right protected by the ICCPR.

In contrast, Article 26 contains a revolutionary norm by providing an autonomous equality principle which is not dependent upon another right under the convention being infringed. This has the effect of widening the scope of the non-discrimination principle beyond the scope of ICCPR.

== Optional protocols ==
There are two Optional Protocols to the Covenant. The First Optional Protocol establishes an individual complaints mechanism, allowing individuals to complain to the Human Rights Committee about violations of the Covenant. This has led to the creation of a complex jurisprudence on the interpretation and implementation of the Covenant. As of December 2025, the First Optional Protocol has 116 parties.

The Second Optional Protocol abolishes the death penalty; however, countries were permitted to make a reservation allowing for use of death penalty for the most serious crimes of a military nature, committed during wartime. As of December 2025, the Second Optional Protocol had 92 parties.

== Reservations ==
A number of parties have made reservations and interpretative declarations to their application of the Covenant.

Argentina will apply the fair trial rights guaranteed in its constitution to the prosecution of those accused of violating the general law of nations.

Australia reserves the right to progressively implement the prison standards of Article 10, to compensate for miscarriages of justice by administrative means rather than through the courts, and interprets the prohibition on racial incitement as being subject to the freedoms of expression, association and assembly. It also declares that its implementation will be effected at each level of its federal system.

Austria reserves the right to continue to exile members of the House of Habsburg, and limits the rights of the accused and the right to a fair trial to those already existing in its legal system.

The Bahamas, due to problems with implementation, reserves the right not to compensate for miscarriages of justice.

Bahrain interprets Articles 3 (no sexual discrimination), 18 (freedom of religion) and 23 (family rights) within the context of Islamic Sharia law.

Bangladesh reserves the right to try people in absentia where they are fugitives from justice and declares that resource constraints mean that it cannot necessarily segregate prisons or provide counsel for accused persons.

Barbados reserves the right not to provide free counsel for accused persons due to resource constraints.

Belgium interprets the freedoms of speech, assembly and association in a manner consistent with the European Convention on Human Rights. It does not consider itself obliged to ban war propaganda as required by Article 20, and interprets that article in light of the freedom of expression in the UDHR.

Belize reserves the right not to compensate for miscarriages of justice, due to problems with implementation, and does not plan to provide free legal counsel for the same reasons as above. It also refuses to ensure the right to free travel at any time, due to a law requiring those travelling abroad to provide tax clearance certificates.

The People's Republic of the Congo (a predecessor state of the current Republic of the Congo) declared that as per the Congolese Code of Civil, Commercial, Administrative and Financial Procedure, in matters of private law, decisions or orders emanating from conciliation proceedings may be enforced through imprisonment for debt.

Denmark reserves the right to exclude the press and the public from trials as per its own laws. Reservation is further made to Article 20, paragraph 1. This reservation is in accordance with the vote cast by Denmark in the XVI General Assembly of the United Nations in 1961 when the Danish Delegation, referring to the preceding article concerning freedom of expression, voted against the prohibition against propaganda for war.

The Gambia, as per its constitution, will provide free legal assistance for accused persons charged with capital offences only.

Pakistan has made several reservations to the articles in the convention; "the provisions of Articles 3, 6, 7, 18 and 19 shall be so applied to the extent that they are not repugnant to the Provisions of the Constitution of Pakistan and the Sharia laws", "the provisions of Article 12 shall be so applied as to be in conformity with the Provisions of the Constitution of Pakistan", "With respect to Article 13, the Government of the Islamic Republic of Pakistan reserves its right to apply its law relating to foreigners", "the provisions of Article 25 shall be so applied to the extent that they are not repugnant to the Provisions of the Constitution of Pakistan", and the Government of the Islamic Republic of Pakistan "does not recognize the competence of the Committee provided for in Article 40 of the Covenant".

The United States has made reservations that none of the articles should restrict the right of free speech and association; that the US government may impose capital punishment on any person other than a pregnant woman, including persons below the age of 18 (though it does not mention that such executions have been found unconstitutional); that "cruel, inhuman and degrading treatment or punishment" refers to those treatments or punishments prohibited by one or more of the fifth, eighth, and fourteenth amendments to the US Constitution; that the third clause of Paragraph 1, Article 15 will not apply; and that, notwithstanding paragraphs 2(b) and 3 of Article 10 and paragraph 4 of Article 14, the US government may treat juveniles as adults, and accept volunteers to the military prior to the age of 18. The United States also submitted five "understandings", and four "declarations".

== Implementation and effects ==
The International Covenant on Civil and Political Rights has 175 states parties, 74 by signature and ratification, and the remainder by accession or succession. Another six states have signed but have yet to ratify the treaty.

According to a 2013 study, the ICCPR has significantly improved human rights practices on matters where evidence-production costs and standards of proof are low, but has had a limited impact for issue areas where legally admissible evidence is costly to produce and standards of proof are high. This means that the ICCPR has "significantly improved governments' respect for the freedoms of speech, association, assembly, and religion" but has had insignificant effects on respect to personal integrity rights.

=== Australia ===
The Covenant is not directly enforceable in Australia, but its provisions support a number of domestic laws, which confer enforceable rights on individuals. For example, Article 17 of the convention has been implemented by the Australian Privacy Act 1988. Likewise, the Covenant's equality and anti-discrimination provisions support the federal Disability Discrimination Act 1992. Finally, the Covenant is one of the major sources of 'human rights' listed in the Human Rights (Parliamentary Scrutiny) Act 2011. This law requires most new legislation and administrative instruments (such as delegated/subordinate legislation) to be tabled in parliament with a statement outlining the proposed law's compatibility with the listed human rights A Joint Committee on Human Rights scrutinises all new legislation and statements of compatibility. The findings of the Joint Committee are not legally binding.

Legislation also establishes the Australian Human Rights Commission which allows the Australian Human Rights Commission (AHRC) to examine enacted legislation (to suggest remedial enactments), its administration (to suggest avoidance of practices) and general compliance with the covenant which is scheduled to the AHRC legislation.

In Victoria and the Australian Capital Territory, the convention can be used by a plaintiff or defendant who invokes those jurisdiction's human rights charters. While the Convention cannot be used to overturn a Victorian or ACT law, a Court can issue a 'declaration of incompatibility' that requires the relevant Attorney-General to respond in Parliament within a set time period. (Note: For example, Part 4, Human Rights Act 2004 (ACT).) Courts in Victoria and the ACT are also directed by the legislation to interpret the law in a way to give effect to a human right, and new legislation and subordinate legislation must be accompanied by a statement of compatibility. (Note: For example, Part 4, Human Rights Act 2004 (ACT).) Efforts to implement a similar Charter at the national level have been frustrated and Australia's Constitution may prevent conferring the 'declaration' power on federal judges.

=== Ireland ===
Ireland's use of Special Criminal Courts where juries are replaced by judges and other special procedures apply has been found to not violate the treaty: "In the Committee's view, trial before courts other than the ordinary courts is not necessarily, per se, a violation of the entitlement to a fair hearing and the facts of the present case do not show that there has been such a violation."

=== New Zealand ===
New Zealand took measures to give effect to many of the rights contained within it by passing the New Zealand Bill of Rights Act in 1990, and formally incorporated the status of protected person into law through the passing of the Immigration Act 2009.

=== Sri Lanka ===
Sri Lankan author Shakthika Sathkumara was arrested on 1 April 2019 for inciting religious violence, following a publication of a short story about homosexuality and child abuse at a Buddhist temple in Sri Lanka. The author had been adjudged the best Sinhala language short story writer in Sri Lanka's National Youth Literary Festivals of 2010 and 2014, and was twice the recipient of the north western provincial state literary award. A group of Buddhist monks had stormed the author's workplace demanding punitive action against him after the story first appeared on Facebook; the ICCPR prohibits "advocacy of national, racial or religious hatred that constitutes incitement to discrimination, hostility or violence". Human rights organizations Civicus and the Asian Human Rights Commission (AHRC) have asserted that the charges are spurious and a clear violation of the author's right to freedom of expression. He was released without charge after 127 days.

=== United States ===
==== Reservations, understandings, and declarations ====
The United States Senate ratified the ICCPR in 1992, with five reservations, five understandings, and four declarations. Some have noted that with so many reservations, its implementation has little domestic effect, although it has been argued that the reason behind the Senate reservations is that Article 20(2) (regarding hate speech) of the ICCPR may be unconstitutional according to Supreme Court precedent. Included in the Senate's ratification was the declaration that "the provisions of Article 1 through 27 of the Covenant are not self-executing", and a Senate Executive Report stated that the declaration was meant to "clarify that the Covenant will not create a private cause of action in U.S. Courts".

Where a treaty or covenant is not self-executing, and where Congress has not acted to implement the agreement with legislation, no private right of action within the US judicial system is created by ratification. However, a reservation that is "incompatible with the object and purpose" of a treaty is void as a matter of the Vienna Convention on the Law of Treaties and international law, and there is question as to whether the non-self-execution declaration is even constitutional under the Supremacy Clause (Prof. Louis Henkin argues that it is not). Prof. Jordan Paust criticizes the United States' ratification subject to the non-self-execution declaration as being an abuse of the treaty.

== Parties to the Covenant ==
There are a total of 175 parties to the International Covenant on Civil and Political Rights.

State party	Signed	Ratified or acceded	Entry into force
Afghanistan	—	24 January 1983	24 April 1983
Albania	—	4 October 1991	4 January 1992
Algeria	10 December 1968	12 September 1989	12 December 1989
Andorra	5 August 2002	22 September 2006	22 December 2006
Angola	—	10 January 1992	10 April 1992
Antigua and Barbuda	—	3 July 2019	3 November 2019
Argentina	18 February 1968	8 August 1986	8 November 1986
Armenia	—	23 June 1993	23 September 1993
Australia	18 December 1972	13 August 1980	13 November 1980
Austria	10 December 1973	10 September 1978	10 December 1978
Azerbaijan	—	13 August 1992	13 November 1992
Bahamas	4 December 2008	23 December 2008	23 March 2009
Bahrain	—	20 September 2006	20 December 2006
Bangladesh	—	6 September 2000	6 December 2000
Barbados	—	5 January 1973	23 March 1976
Belarus	19 March 1968	12 November 1973	23 March 1976
Belgium	10 December 1968	12 April 1983	12 July 1983
Belize	—	10 June 1996	10 September 1996
Benin	—	12 March 1992	12 June 1992
Bolivia	—	12 August 1982	12 November 1982
Bosnia and Herzegovina (Note: Yugoslavia signed the Covenant on 8 August 1967 and ratified it on 2 June 1971; it entered into force for Yugoslavia on 23 March 1976. Following the breakup of Yugoslavia, the following states located in the former Yugoslavia made declarations regarding that status of the Covenant with regard to themselves: Bosnia and Herzegovina – On 1 September 1993, it declared that the Covenant was in force for it since 6 March 1992.; Federal Republic of Yugoslavia – On 12 March 2001, it declared that the Covenant was in force for it since 27 April 1992. On 4 February 2003, the Federal Republic of Yugoslavia changed its name to Serbia and Montenegro, and on 3 June 2006 Serbia succeeded Serbia and Montenegro. Therefore, for Serbia, the Covenant has retroactively been in force since 27 April 1992.; North Macedonia – On 18 January 1994, it declared that the Covenant was in force for it since 17 September 1991.; Montenegro – On 23 October 2006, it declared that the Covenant was in force for it since 3 June 2006.)	—	1 September 1993	6 March 1992
Botswana	8 September 2000	8 September 2000	8 December 2000
Brazil	—	24 January 1992	24 April 1992
Bulgaria	8 October 1968	21 September 1970	23 March 1976
Burkina Faso	—	4 January 1999	4 April 1999
Burundi	—	8 May 1990	8 August 1990
Cambodia (Note: Although Cambodia signed the Covenant when it was known as Democratic Kampuchea, it filed an instrument of accession, not ratification, on 26 May 1992.)	17 October 1980	26 May 1992	26 August 1992
Cameroon	—	27 January 1984	27 April 1984
Canada	—	19 May 1976	19 August 1976
Cape Verde	—	6 August 1993	6 November 1993
Central African Republic	—	8 May 1981	8 August 1981
Chad	—	9 June 1995	9 September 1995
Chile	16 September 1969	10 February 1972	23 March 1976
Colombia	21 December 1966	29 October 1969	23 March 1976
Democratic Republic of the Congo	—	1 November 1976	1 February 1977
Republic of the Congo	—	5 October 1983	5 January 1984
Costa Rica	19 December 1966	29 November 1968	23 March 1976
Croatia	—	12 October 1992	12 January 1993
Cyprus	19 December 1966	2 April 1969	23 March 1976
Czech Republic (Note: Czechoslovakia signed the Covenant on 7 October 1968 and ratified it on 23 December 1975; it entered into force for Czechoslovakia on 23 March 1976. Following the dissolution of Czechoslovakia, the Czech Republic declared on 22 February 1993 that the Covenant was in force for it since 1 January 1993 and Slovakia declared on 28 May 1993 that the Covenant was also in force for it since 1 January 1993.)	—	22 February 1993	1 January 1993
Denmark	20 March 1968	6 January 1972	23 March 1976
Djibouti	—	5 November 2002	5 February 2003
Dominica	—	17 June 1993	17 September 1993
Dominican Republic	—	4 January 1978	4 April 1978
Ecuador	4 April 1968	6 March 1969	23 March 1976
Egypt	4 August 1967	14 January 1982	14 April 1982
El Salvador	21 September 1967	30 November 1979	29 February 1980
Equatorial Guinea	—	25 September 1987	25 December 1987
Eritrea	—	22 January 2002	22 April 2002
Estonia	—	21 October 1991	21 January 1992
Eswatini	—	26 March 2004	26 June 2004
Ethiopia	—	11 June 1993	11 September 1993
Fiji	—	16 August 2018	16 November 2018
Finland	11 October 1967	19 August 1975	23 March 1976
France	—	4 November 1980	4 February 1981
Gabon	—	21 January 1983	21 April 1983
Gambia, The	—	22 March 1979	22 June 1979
Georgia	—	3 May 1994	3 August 1994
Germany (Note: East Germany signed the Covenant on 23 March 1973 and ratified it on 8 November 1973; it entered into force for East Germany on 23 March 1976. Following the reunification of Germany on 3 October 1990, East Germany ceased to exist.)	9 October 1968	17 December 1973	23 March 1976
Ghana	7 September 2000	7 September 2000	7 December 2000
Greece	—	5 May 1997	5 August 1997
Grenada	—	6 September 1991	6 December 1991
Guatemala	—	5 May 1992	5 August 1992
Guinea	28 February 1967	24 January 1978	24 April 1978
Guinea-Bissau	12 September 2000	1 November 2010	1 February 2011
Guyana	22 August 1968	15 February 1977	15 May 1977
Haiti	—	6 February 1991	6 May 1991
Honduras	19 December 1966	25 August 1997	25 November 1997
Hungary	25 March 1969	17 January 1974	23 March 1976
Iceland	30 December 1968	22 August 1979	22 November 1979
India	—	10 April 1979	10 July 1979
Indonesia	—	23 February 2006	23 May 2006
Iran	4 April 1968	24 June 1975	23 March 1976
Iraq	18 February 1969	25 January 1971	23 March 1976
Ireland	1 October 1973	8 December 1989	8 March 1990
Israel	19 December 1966	3 October 1991	3 January 1992
Italy	18 January 1967	15 September 1978	15 December 1978
Ivory Coast	—	26 March 1992	26 June 1992
Jamaica	19 December 1966	3 October 1975	23 March 1976
Japan	30 May 1978	21 June 1979	21 September 1979
Jordan	30 June 1972	28 May 1975	23 March 1976
Kazakhstan	2 December 2003	24 January 2006	24 April 2006
Kenya	—	1 May 1972	23 March 1976
Kuwait	—	21 May 1996	21 August 1996
Kyrgyzstan	—	7 October 1994	7 January 1995
Laos	7 December 2000	25 September 2009	25 December 2009
Latvia	—	14 April 1992	14 July 1992
Lebanon	—	3 November 1972	23 March 1976
Lesotho	—	9 September 1992	9 December 1992
Liberia	18 April 1967	22 September 2004	22 December 2004
Libya	—	15 May 1970	23 March 1976
Liechtenstein	—	10 December 1998	10 March 1999
Lithuania	—	20 November 1991	10 February 1992
Luxembourg	26 November 1974	18 August 1983	18 November 1983
Madagascar	17 September 1969	21 June 1971	23 March 1976
Malawi	—	22 December 1993	22 March 1994
Maldives	—	19 September 2006	19 December 2006
Mali	—	16 July 1974	23 March 1976
Malta	—	13 September 1990	13 December 1990
Marshall Islands	—	12 March 2018	12 June 2018
Mauritania	—	17 November 2004	17 February 2005
Mauritius	—	12 December 1973	23 March 1976
Mexico	—	23 March 1981	23 June 1981
Moldova	—	26 January 1993	26 April 1993
Monaco	26 June 1997	28 August 1997	28 November 1997
Mongolia	5 June 1968	18 November 1974	23 March 1976
Montenegro	—	23 October 2006	3 June 2006
Morocco	19 January 1977	3 May 1979	3 August 1979
Mozambique	—	21 July 1993	21 October 1993
Namibia	—	28 November 1994	28 February 1995
Nepal	—	14 May 1991	14 August 1991
Netherlands	25 June 1969	11 December 1978	11 March 1979
New Zealand	12 November 1968	28 December 1978	28 March 1979
Nicaragua	—	12 March 1980	12 June 1980
Niger	—	7 March 1986	7 June 1986
Nigeria	—	29 July 1993	29 October 1993
North Korea (Note: On 25 August 1997, North Korea notified the Secretary-General of the United Nations that it was withdrawing from the Covenant. However, the Secretary-General still considers North Korea a state party to the Covenant because the Covenant does not allow for withdrawal and therefore withdrawal would only be possible if all other states parties allowed it, which has not occurred.)	—	14 September 1981	14 December 1981
North Macedonia	—	18 January 1994	17 September 1991
Norway	20 March 1968	13 September 1972	23 March 1976
Oman	—	10 November 2025	10 February 2026
Pakistan	17 April 2008	23 June 2010	23 September 2010
Palestine	—	2 April 2014	2 July 2014
Panama	27 July 1976	8 March 1977	8 June 1977
Papua New Guinea	—	21 July 2008	21 October 2008
Paraguay	—	10 June 1992	10 September 1992
Peru	11 August 1977	28 April 1978	28 July 1978
Philippines	19 December 1966	23 October 1986	23 January 1987
Poland	2 March 1967	18 March 1977	18 June 1977
Portugal (Note: Portugal extended the territorial application of the Covenant to Macau on 27 April 1993. On 3 December 1999, China notified the Secretary-General of the United Nations that the Covenant would still be in force for Macau following the transfer of sovereignty on 20 December 1999.)	7 October 1976	15 June 1978	15 September 1978
Qatar	—	21 May 2018	21 August 2018
Romania	27 June 1968	9 December 1974	23 March 1976
Russia	18 March 1968	16 October 1973	23 March 1976
Rwanda	—	16 April 1975	23 March 1976
Saint Vincent and the Grenadines	—	9 November 1981	9 February 1981
Samoa	—	15 February 2008	15 May 2008
San Marino	—	18 October 1985	18 January 1986
São Tomé and Príncipe	31 October 1995	10 January 2017	10 April 2017
Senegal	6 July 1970	13 February 1978	13 May 1978
Serbia	—	12 March 2001	27 April 1992
Seychelles	—	5 May 1992	5 August 1992
Sierra Leone	—	23 August 1996	23 November 1996
Slovakia	—	28 May 1993	1 January 1993
Slovenia	—	6 July 1992	6 October 1992
Somalia	—	24 January 1990	24 April 1990
South Africa	3 October 1994	10 December 1998	10 March 1999
South Korea	—	10 April 1990	10 July 1990
South Sudan	—	5 February 2024	5 May 2024
Spain	28 September 1976	27 April 1977	27 July 1977
Sri Lanka	—	11 June 1980	11 September 1980
Sudan	—	18 March 1986	18 June 1986
Suriname	—	28 December 1976	28 March 1977
Sweden	29 September 1967	6 December 1971	23 March 1976
Switzerland	—	18 June 1992	18 September 1992
Syria	—	21 April 1969	23 March 1976
Tajikistan	—	4 January 1999	4 April 1999
Tanzania	—	11 June 1976	11 September 1976
Thailand	—	29 October 1996	29 January 1997
Timor-Leste	—	18 September 2003	18 December 2003
Togo	—	24 May 1984	24 August 1984
Trinidad and Tobago	—	21 December 1978	21 March 1979
Tunisia	30 April 1968	18 March 1969	23 March 1976
Turkey	15 August 2000	23 September 2003	23 December 2003
Turkmenistan	—	1 May 1997	1 August 1997
Uganda	—	21 June 1995	21 September 1995
Ukraine	20 March 1968	12 November 1973	23 March 1976
United Kingdom (Note: Both China and the United Kingdom notified the Secretary-General that the Covenant would continue to remain in force for Hong Kong upon transfer of sovereignty on 1 July 1997.)	16 September 1968	20 May 1976	20 August 1976
United States	5 October 1977	8 June 1992	8 September 1992
Uruguay	21 February 1967	21 May 1967	23 March 1976
Uzbekistan	—	28 September 1995	28 December 1995
Vanuatu	29 November 2007	21 November 2008	21 February 2009
Venezuela	24 June 1969	10 May 1978	10 August 1978
Vietnam	—	24 September 1982	24 December 1982
Yemen	—	9 February 1987	9 May 1987
Zambia	—	10 April 1984	10 July 1984
Zimbabwe	—	13 May 1991	13 August 1991

== States not party to the Covenant ==
Most states in the world are parties to the ICCPR. As of 2025, the following 23 states have not become party to it, of which six states have signed the Covenant but not ratified it.

=== Signatories that have signed and not ratified ===
State	Signed
China	5 October 1998
Comoros	25 September 2008
Cuba	28 February 2008
Nauru	12 November 2001
Palau	20 September 2011
Saint Lucia	22 September 2011

=== States which are neither signatories nor parties ===
1. Bhutan
2. Brunei
3. Kiribati
4. Malaysia
5. Micronesia
6. Myanmar
7. Saint Kitts and Nevis
8. Saudi Arabia
9. Singapore
10. Solomon Islands
11. Tonga
12. Tuvalu
13. United Arab Emirates

=== Nonmembers of the UN ===
1. Cook Islands
2. Niue
3. Taiwan (Note: The Republic of China signed the Covenant on 5 October 1967 but did not ratify it at the time. On 25 October 1971, it lost its United Nations membership. On 31 March 2009, the Legislative Yuan of the Republic of China ratified it along with the International Covenant on Economic, Social and Cultural Rights, but the deposit was rejected by the UN.)
4. Vatican City (through the Holy See) (Note: The Vatican is not a member of the United Nations but holds observer status.)

== See also ==
- United Nations Human Rights Committee
- United Nations Human Rights Council
- United Nations list of non-self-governing territories
- United Nations General Assembly Resolution 66 (I)
- United Nations General Assembly Resolution 1514 (XV)
- United Nations General Assembly Resolution 1541 (XV)
- United Nations General Assembly Resolution 1654 (XVI)
