= Special Committee on Decolonization =

UN General Assembly special committee

- Abbreviation: C24
- Formation: 27 November 1961; 64 years ago
- Legal status: Active
- Headquarters: New York City, United States
- Head: Chair (Grenada) Keisha A. McGuire
- Parent organization: United Nations General Assembly

The United Nations Special Committee on the Situation with Regard to the Implementation of the Declaration on the Granting of Independence to Colonial Countries and Peoples, or the Special Committee on Decolonization (C-24), is a committee of the United Nations General Assembly that was established in 1961 and is exclusively devoted to the issue of decolonization.

== History ==
When the United Nations was created, there were 750 million people living in territories that were non-self-governing. However, the Charter of the United Nations included, in Chapter XI, provisions calling for recognition of the rights of inhabitants of territories administered by its Member States. It called for these Member States to aid in the establishment of self-governance through the development of free political institutions, as well as to keep in mind the political aspirations of the people.

The Charter also created, in Chapter XII, the international trusteeship system. This system allowed for the administration and supervision of territories placed under the control of the United Nations by Member States wishing to grant independence to their colonial possessions. These "Trust" territories were administered by the United Nations Trusteeship Council, which was created by Chapter XIII of the Charter.

Hoping to speed up the process of decolonization, the General Assembly passed Resolution 1514 (XV), also known as the Declaration on the Granting of Independence to Colonial Countries and Peoples. The Declaration stated that all peoples have the right to self-determination and that immediate steps should be taken to end colonialism unconditionally.

=== Original member states ===
On 27 November 1961, the General Assembly created the precursor to the Special Committee by Resolution 1654 (XVI), which established a Special Committee of 17 member states to examine the application of the Declaration and to make recommendations on how to better implement it. The original member states were:

- Australia
- Cambodia
- Ethiopian Empire
- India
- Italy
- Madagascar
- Mali
- Polish People's Republic
- Soviet Union
- Syria
- Tanganyika
- Tunisia
- United Kingdom
- United States
- Uruguay
- Venezuela
- Yugoslavia

On 7 December 1962, the General Assembly added seven seats to the committee, bringing the total number of member states up to 24. The number increased again in 2004, 2008, and 2010. The number 24 continues to be used when describing the Committee even though it now has 29 member states.

=== International Decades for the Eradication of Colonialism ===
In 1990, the General Assembly proclaimed 1990–2000 as the First International Decades for the Eradication of Colonialism by Resolution 43/47, with the ultimate goal being the full implementation of the Declaration on the Granting of Independence to Colonial Countries and Peoples. The General Assembly adopted the report of the Secretary-General dated 13 December 1991 as the Plan of Action for the Decade.

On 8 December 2000, the General Assembly proceeded to proclaim the Second International Decade for the Eradication of Colonialism, lasting from 2001 to 2010 via Resolution 55/146. The Resolution called upon Member States to redouble their efforts to implement the Plan of Action during the Second Decade.

On 10 December 2010, the General Assembly proclaimed 2010–2020 as the Third International Decade for the Eradication of Colonialism via Resolution 65/119. The Resolution called upon Member States to intensify their efforts to continue to implement the Plan of Action during the Third Decade.

In 2020, the General Assembly proclaimed 2021–2030 as the Fourth International Decade for the Eradication of Colonialism via Resolution 75/123.

== Working methods ==
The Committee holds its main session in New York in June, as well as an annual seminar in the Caribbean and Pacific in alternate years. In 2018, the seminar was held in St. George's, Grenada.

At each main session, the Committee reviews the list of territories to which the Declaration on the Granting of Independence to Colonial Countries and Peoples is applicable and makes recommendations on its implementation and on the dissemination of public information on decolonization to the local population. It also hears statements from Non-Self-Governing Territories (NSGTs), dispatches missions to these NSGTs and organizes seminars on the political, social and economic situation in the NSGTs.

The Committee reports to the General Assembly on its work through the Fourth Committee (Special Political and Decolonization).

== Listed non-self-governing territories ==
Currently, there are 17 territories on the United Nations list of non-self-governing territories.

Territory
Territory	Capital	Currency	Language(s)	Population	Administering Power	UN Continental Region	UN Geographical Subregion	Notes	Source(s)
American Samoa (Note: Also known in the conventional form as the Territory of American Samoa.)	Pago Pago	United States dollar	English	44,620	United States	Oceania	Polynesia	(Note: Political status: Unincorporated unorganized territory of the United States, administered by the Office of Insular Affairs, U.S. Department of the Interior.) (Note: Swains Island is claimed by Tokelau as Olohega.)	
Anguilla	The Valley	Eastern Caribbean dollar	English	15,753	United Kingdom	Americas	Caribbean	(Note: Political status: Overseas territory of the United Kingdom.)	
Bermuda	Hamilton	Bermudian dollar	English	63,913	United Kingdom	Americas	Caribbean		
British Virgin Islands	Road Town	United States dollar (Note: The economy is closely tied to the larger and more populous United States Virgin Islands to the west. The U.S. dollar is the legal currency.)	English	30,030	United Kingdom	Americas	Caribbean		
Cayman Islands	George Town	Cayman Islands dollar	English	81,546	United Kingdom	Americas	Caribbean		
Falkland Islands (Malvinas) (disputed) (Note: The United Nations Special Committee on Decolonization considers South Georgia and the South Sandwich Islands to be a part of the Falkland Islands (Malvinas). The Falkland Islands (Malvinas) includes two main islands (East Falkland and West Falkland) and about 200 smaller islands or islets. South Georgia and the South Sandwich Islands includes one main island (South Georgia) and an archipelago (the South Sandwich Islands). Argentina also claims these islands.)	Stanley	Falkland Islands pound	English	3,662	United Kingdom	Americas	South America	(Note: Political status: Disputed territory. Administered by the United Kingdom as an overseas territory named the Falkland Islands, claimed by Argentina as the Islas Malvinas (see Falkland Islands sovereignty dispute).)	
French Polynesia (Note: Also known as the Overseas Country of French Polynesia.)	Papeete	CFP franc	French	278,786	France	Oceania	Polynesia	(Note: Political status: Overseas collectivity and overseas country of France.)	
Gibraltar (disputed)	Gibraltar	Gibraltar pound	English	34,003	United Kingdom	Europe	Southern Europe	(Note: Political status: Disputed territory. Administered by the United Kingdom as an overseas territory, claimed by Spain (see Status of Gibraltar).)	
Guam	Hagåtña	United States dollar	English	168,801	United States	Oceania	Micronesia	(Note: Political status: Unincorporated organized territory of the United States.)	
Montserrat	Plymouth	Eastern Caribbean dollar	English	4,390	United Kingdom	Americas	Caribbean		
New Caledonia	Nouméa	CFP franc	French	271,407	France	Oceania	Melanesia	(Note: Political status: Sui generis collectivity of France.)	
Pitcairn (Note: Officially the Pitcairn, Henderson, Ducie and Oeno Islands.)	Adamstown	New Zealand dollar	English	47	United Kingdom	Oceania	Polynesia		
Saint Helena (Note: Officially Saint Helena, Ascension and Tristan da Cunha.)	Jamestown	Saint Helena pound	English	5,633	United Kingdom	Africa	Western Africa		
Tokelau	(none) (Note: Tokelau has no official capital, each atoll has its own administrative centre.)	New Zealand dollar	English	1,499	New Zealand	Oceania	Polynesia	(Note: Political status: Non-self-governing territory of New Zealand.)	
Turks and Caicos Islands	Grand Turk (Note: Commonly known as Cockburn Town.)	United States dollar	English	44,542	United Kingdom	Americas	Caribbean		
United States Virgin Islands	Charlotte Amalie	United States dollar	English	87,146	United States	Americas	Caribbean		
Western Sahara (disputed)	El Aaiún (claimed)	Disputed	Arabic; Spanish	565,581	None (de facto) (Note: The Polisario Front is occasionally invited to speak as the territory's representative before the C-24, though this practice is inconsistent. As an occupying force, Morocco cannot be regarded as Western Sahara's "de facto administering power".); Spain (de jure)	Africa	Northern Africa		

These territories do not have representation equivalent to other regions of their parent states. As of December 2021, several have rejected a change of status through referendums, such as New Caledonia in 2018, 2020, and 2021, the Falkland Islands in 2013, and Gibraltar in 2002. Likewise, in 2013, the elected Assembly of French Polynesia opposed the territory's inclusion in the list. Others, such as Guam, have voted for a change in status but been refused by their colonising state.

== Membership ==
The member states of the committee.

The following are the current member states of the committee:

- Antigua and Barbuda
- Bolivia
- Chile
- China
- Congo
- Côte d'Ivoire
- Cuba
- Dominica
- Ethiopia*
- Fiji
- Grenada
- India*
- Indonesia
- Iran
- Iraq
- Mali*
- Nicaragua
- Papua New Guinea
- Russia*
- Saint Kitts and Nevis
- Saint Lucia
- Saint Vincent and the Grenadines
- Sierra Leone
- Syria*
- Tanzania*
- Timor-Leste
- Tunisia*
- Venezuela*

* Original member state

=== Controversy ===
Territories with independence movements are disputed for their qualification as colonial countries and their admission for decolonization. Various current and previous member states on various occasions have disputed and blocked the admission and re-admission of their respective territories for decolonization.

- China has blocked the admission of Hong Kong, Inner Mongolia, Macao, Tibet, and Xinjiang as non-self-governing territories. China considers Hong Kong and Macao as territories forcibly ceded to European powers, the territories are possessions rather than colonies, and that China enjoys sovereignty over these territories. China claims that these regions are currently self-governed and are generally not considered colonial holdings. However, the annexations of Tibet and Xinjiang led to their current status as autonomous regions of China, and there have been various disputed accounts of forced sterilization and abortion in Tibet and Xinjiang, alleged forced labor and internment in Xinjiang, and Western accusations of forced assimilation, political control, and stripping of political representation to people of all these regions.
- Russia has disputed at least 26 territories as colonial countries from admissions for decolonization. Among these Russian territories are Adygea, Altai, Bashkortostan, Buryatia, Chechnya, Chukotka, Chuvashia, Crimea, Dagestan, Ingushetia, Kabardino-Balkaria, Kalmykia, Karachay-Cherkessia, Karelia, Khakassia, Khanty-Mansi, Komi, Mari El, Mordovia, Nenets, North Ossetia–Alania, Sakha (Yakutia), Tatarstan, Tuva, Udmurtia, and Yamalo-Nenets. Historically, forced ethnic migrations have been conducted to retain control over certain territories. Though these territories enjoyed varying degrees of self-governance through sovereignty pacts reached with the Russian Federation, these pacts have since expired, and regional autonomy has gradually eroded.
- The United States retains Puerto Rico as an unincorporated organized territory, which the committee has deemed insufficient in providing them self-determination. However, its Commonwealth status compelled the committee to remove it from the United Nations list of non-self-governing territories in 1952. Despite the United States Virgin Islands being on the list of Non-Self-Governing Territories, 81.60% of the voters voted to remain as a U.S. territory with only 13.44% wanting "integration with the U.S." and 4.96% preferring independence in the 1993 United States Virgin Islands status referendum that was albeit invalidated due to less than half of the eligible voters turning out.

Various organizations, including the British delegates, claimed that the committee is 'no longer relevant' to the United Kingdom Overseas Territories as many of its member states are colonizers themselves, controlling various territories wanting independence.

== Bureau ==
As of 2025, the officers comprising the bureau of the Special Committee are:

Name	Country	Position
Menissa Rambally	Saint Lucia	Chair
Ernesto Soberon Guzman	Cuba	Vice-chair
Hari Prabowo	Indonesia	Vice-chair
Michael Imran Kanu	Sierra Leone	Vice-chair
Koussay Aldahhak	Syrian Arab Republic	Rapporteur

== Recommendation on Puerto Rico ==
The Special Committee on Decolonization refers to the Commonwealth of Puerto Rico (an unincorporated organized territory of the United States) as a nation in its reports, because, internationally, the people of Puerto Rico are often considered to be a Caribbean nation with their own national identity. Most recently, in a June 2016 report, the Special Committee called for the United States to expedite the process to allow self-determination in Puerto Rico. More specifically, the group called on the United States to expedite a process that would allow the people of Puerto Rico to exercise fully their right to self-determination and independence. ... [and] allow the Puerto Rican people to take decisions in a sovereign manner and to address their urgent economic and social needs, including unemployment, marginalization, insolvency and poverty". However, the Special Committee removed Puerto Rico from the list of non-self-governing territories in 1952 due to it gaining Commonwealth status in the United States.

In one of the referendums on the political status of Puerto Rico held in 2012, only 5.49% of Puerto Ricans voted for independence, while 61.16% voted for statehood and 33.34% preferred free association. Another then-recent referendum was held in 2017 with over 97% voting in favor of statehood over independence, though historically low voter turnout (23%) has called into question the validity of the poll. Much of the low turnout has been attributed to a boycott led by the pro-status-quo PPD party and the pro-independence PIP party. A 2020 referendum also backed statehood 53 percent to 47 percent, with 55 percent turnout.

On June 22, 2023, while Puerto Rico currently enjoys the status of a free state associated with the United States, the UN Special Committee once again calls on the Government of the United States to assume its responsibility and to take measures that allow the Puerto Rican people to exercise their right to self-determination and independence, as well as to make sovereign decisions, in order to urgently meet the economic and social needs of the country.

In June 2024, around twenty independence and sovereignist organizations spoke on Puerto Rico during a session of the United Nations Decolonization Committee. The committee affirmed Puerto Rico's right to self-determination and independence. In July 2024, Governor Pedro Pierluisi called a plebiscite on the status of Puerto Rico in November 2024, for the first time the island's current status as a U.S. territory will not be an option during the non-binding plebiscite. The executive order follows the U.S. House of Representatives' 2022 approval of a bill to help Puerto Rico move toward a change in territorial status. Voters are given the choice of statehood, independence, or independence with free association, the terms of which would be negotiated regarding foreign affairs, U.S. citizenship, and use of the U.S. dollar.

In June 2025, the United Nations adopted a resolution in favor of self-determination and independence for the state of Puerto Rico.

== See also ==
- Dependent territory
- Proposed political status for Puerto Rico
- Sovereigntism (Puerto Rico)
- Special Political and Decolonization Committee
- United Nations list of non-self-governing territories
