= Colony =

Territory governed by another country

A colony is a territory subject to a form of foreign rule, which rules the territory and its indigenous peoples separated from the foreign rulers, the colonizer, and their metropole (or "mother country"). This separated rule was often organized into colonial empires, with their metropoles at their centers, making colonies neither annexed or even integrated territories, nor client states. Particularly new imperialism and its colonialism advanced this separated rule and its lasting coloniality.

The term colony originates from the ancient Roman colonia, a type of Roman settlement. Derived from colonus (farmer, cultivator, planter, or settler), it carries with it the sense of 'farm' and 'landed estate'. Furthermore, the term was used to refer to the older Greek apoikia (Ancient Greek: ἀποικία, lit. 'home away from home'), which were overseas settlements by ancient Greek city-states. The city that founded such a settlement became known as its metropolis ("mother-city"). Since early-modern times, historians, administrators, and political scientists have generally used the term "colony" to refer mainly to the many different overseas territories of particularly European states between the 15th and 20th centuries CE, with colonialism and decolonization as corresponding phenomena.

While colonies often developed from trading outposts or territorial claims, such areas do not need to be a product of colonization, nor become colonially organized territories. Territories furthermore do not need to have been militarily conquered and occupied to come under colonial rule and to be considered de facto colonies, instead neocolonial exploitation of dependency or imperialist use of power to intervene to force policy, might make a territory be considered a colony, which broadens the concept, including indirect rule or puppet states (contrasted by more independent types of client states such as vassal states). Subsequently, some historians have used the term informal colony to refer to a country under a de facto control of another state. Though the broadening of the concept is often contentious.

Contemporarily colonies are identified and organized as not sufficiently self-governed dependent territories. Other past colonies have become either sufficiently incorporated and self-governed, or independent, with some to a varying degree dominated by remaining colonial settler societies or neocolonialism.

== Concept ==
The English-language word "colony" comes from the Latin word colōnia, used for ancient Roman outposts and eventually for cities. The Latin term colōnia in turn derives from the word colōnus, which referred to a Roman tenant farmer.

Settlements that began as Roman coloniae include cities from Cologne (which retains this history in its name) to Belgrade to York. A telltale sign of a settlement within the Roman sphere of influence once being a Roman colony is a city centre with a grid pattern.

Historians and political scientists may distinguish "settler colonies" as a subset of the class of colonies. Settler colonies comprise a more particular type of a settlement or community.

== Ancient examples ==
- Carthage formed as a Phoenician colony
- Cádiz formed as a Phoenician colony
- Cyrene was a colony of the Greeks of Thera
- Sicily was a part Greek, part Phoenician colony
- Sardinia was a Phoenician colony
- Marseille formed as a Greek colony
- Malta was a Phoenician colony
- Cologne formed as a Roman colony and its modern name refer to the Latin term "colonia".
- Kandahar formed as a Greek colony during the Hellenistic era by Alexander the Great in 330 BC.

== More modern historical examples ==
- L'Anse aux Meadows: a Norse colony which existed c. 1025 AD.
- Angola: a colony of Portugal from the 16th century to its independence in 1975.
- Australia was formed as a Dominion in 1901 from a federation of six distinct British colonies which were founded between 1788 and 1829.
- Barbados: was a colony of Great Britain that was important in the Atlantic slave trade. It gained its independence in 1966.
- Brazil: a colony of Portugal since the 16th century. Independent since 1822.
- Canada: was colonized first by France as New France (1534–1763) and England (in Newfoundland, 1582) then under British rule (1763–1867), before achieving Dominion status and losing "colony" designation.
- Democratic Republic of the Congo: a colony of Belgium from 1908 to 1960; previously under private ownership of King Leopold II.
- French Indochina was formed in October 1887 from Annam, Tonkin, Cochinchina (which together form modern Vietnam) and the Kingdom of Cambodia; Laos was added after the Franco-Siamese conflict of 1893. The federation lasted until 1954. In the four protectorates, the French formally left the local rulers in power, who were the Emperors of Vietnam, Kings of Cambodia, and Kings of Luang Prabang, but gathered all powers in their hands, the local rulers acting only as figureheads.
- Ghana: Contact between Europe and Ghana (known as the Gold Coast) began in the 15th century with the arrival of the Portuguese. This soon led to the establishment of several colonies by European powers: Portuguese Gold Coast (1482–1642), Dutch Gold Coast (1598–1872), Swedish Gold Coast (1650–1663), Danish Gold Coast (1658–1850), Brandenburger and Prussian Gold Coast (1685–1721) and British Gold Coast (1821–1957). In 1957, Ghana was the first African colony south of the Sahara to become independent.
- Greenland was a colony of Denmark-Norway from 1721 and was a colony of Denmark from 1814 to 1953. In 1953 Greenland was made an equal part of the Danish Kingdom. Home rule was granted in 1979 and extended to self-rule in 2009. See also Danish colonization of the Americas.
- Guinea-Bissau: a colony of Portugal since the 15th century. Independent since 1974.
- Hong Kong was a British colony (from 1983 British Dependent Territory) from 1841 to 1997. Is now a Special Administrative Region of China.
- India was an imperial political entity comprising present-day India, Bangladesh, and Pakistan with regions under the direct control of the British Government of the United Kingdom from 1858 to 1947. From the 15th century until 1961, Portuguese India (Goa) was a colony of Portugal. Pondicherry and Chandernagore were part of French India from 1759 to 1954. Small Danish colonies of Tharangambadi, Serampore and the Nicobar Islands from 1620 to 1869 were known as Danish India.
- Indonesia was a colony of the Netherlands gained full independence in 1949.
- Jamaica was part of the Spanish West Indies in the sixteenth and seventeenth centuries. It became an English colony in 1655 and; independence in 1962.
- Liberia a colony set up in 1821 by American private citizens for the migration of African American freedmen. Liberian Declaration of Independence from the American Colonization Society on 26 July 1847. It is the second oldest black republic in the world after Haiti.
- Macau was a Portuguese colony (from 1976 a "Chinese territory under Portuguese administration") from 1557 to 1999. In 1999, two years after Hong Kong, it became a Special Administrative Region of China.
- Malaysia was initially colonized by the Portuguese Empire in 1511 after capturing Malacca. After 1511, Britain established colonies and trading ports on the Malay Peninsula; Penang was leased to the British East India Company. The Dutch Empire encountered Malaysia when it was looking for spices to trade with.
- Malta was a British protectorate and later a colony from the French Revolutionary Wars in 1800 to independence in 1964.
- Mozambique: a colony of Portugal since the 15th century. Independent since 1975.
- Philippines, previously a colony of Spain from c. 1565 (Note: In 1521, an expedition led by Ferdinand Magellan landed in the islands, and Ruy López de Villalobos named the islands Las Islas Filipinas in honor of Spain's Prince Philip (later to become Philip I of Castile). During a later expedition in 1564, Miguel López de Legazpi conquered the Philippines for Spain. However, it can be argued that Spain's legitimate sovereignty over the islands commenced following a popular referendum in 1599.) to 1898 as part of the Spanish East Indies, was a colony of the United States from 1898 to 1946. Achieved self-governing Commonwealth status in 1935; independent in 1946.
- Puerto Rico was a colony of Spain from 1493 to 1898, when it passed to be a colonial possession of the United States, classified by the United States as "an unincorporated territory". In 1914, the Puerto Rican House of Delegates voted unanimously in favor of independence from the United States, but this was rejected by the U.S. Congress as "unconstitutional" and in violation of the U.S. 1900 Foraker Act. In 1952, after the US Congress approved Puerto Rico's constitution, its formal name became "Commonwealth of Puerto Rico", but its new name "did not change Puerto Rico's political, social, and economic relationship to the United States." That year, the United States advised the United Nations (UN) that the island was a self-governing territory. (Note: During its 8th session, the United Nations General Assembly recognized Puerto Rico's self-government on November 27, 1953, with Resolution 748 (VIII). (UN Resolution "748 (VIII)", adopted on November 27, 1953, during its 459th Plenary Meeting.) This removed Puerto Rico's classification as a non-self-governing territory (under article 73(e) of the Charter of the United Nations). The resolution passed, garnering a favorable vote from some 40% of the General Assembly, with over 60% abstaining or voting against it (20 to 16, plus 18 abstentions). Today, however, the UN "still debates whether Puerto Rico is a colony" or not.) The United States has been "unwilling to play in public the imperial role... it has no appetite for acknowledging in a public way the contradictions implicit in frankly colonial rule." (Note: Sidney Mintz's quote goes on to state, "Something in our history makes the idea of our ruling other people very difficult to deal with. Puerto Rico's political status certainly has evolved in its century inside the North American 'family.' But the permanent interim political status of which Tomas Blanco wrote still has not ended.") The island has been called the world's oldest colony by many, including US Federal judges, US Congresspeople, the Chief Justice of the Puerto Rico Supreme Court, and numerous scholars. (Note: For additional references to Puerto Rico's current (2021) colonial status under U.S. rule, see Nicole Narea, Amy Goodman and Ana Irma Rivera Lassén, David S. Cohen and Sidney W. Mintz.)
- South Africa consisted of territories and colonies by various African and European powers, including the Dutch and the British, and the Nguni. The territory consisting of the modern nation was ruled directly by the British from 1806 to 1910; became a self-governing dominion of Union of South Africa in 1910.
- Sri Lanka: a British colony from 1815 to 1948. Known as Ceylon. Was a British Dominion until 1972. Also a Portuguese colony in the 16th–17th centuries, and a Dutch colony in the 17th–18th centuries.
- Korea was a colony of Japan from 1910 to 1945. North Korea and South Korea were established in 1948.
- Taiwan has a complex history of colonial rule under various powers, including the Dutch (1624–1662), Spanish (1626–1642), Chinese (1683–1895) and Japanese (1895–1945). The precolonial (pre-1624) inhabitants of Taiwan are the ethno-linguistically Austronesian Taiwanese indigenous peoples, rather than the vast majority of present-day Taiwanese people, who are mostly ethno-linguistically Han Chinese. Twice throughout history, Taiwan has served as a quasi rump state for Chinese governments, the first instance being the Ming-loyalist Kingdom of Tungning (1662–1683) and the second instance being the present-day Republic of China (ROC), which officially claims continuity or succession from the Nationalist government, having retreated from mainland China to Taiwan in 1949 during the final years of the Chinese Civil War (1927–1949). The ROC, whose de facto territory consists almost entirely of the island of Taiwan and its minor satellite islands, continues to rule Taiwan as if it were a separate country from the People's Republic of China (consisting of mainland China, Hong Kong, and Macau).
- The United States was formed from a confederation of thirteen British colonies. The Colony of Virginia was the first of the thirteen colonies. All thirteen declared independence in July 1776 and expelled the British governors during the American Revolution

== Current colonies ==
Dependent territories and their sovereign states. All territories are labeled according to ISO 3166-1 (Note: Each territory in the United States Minor Outlying Islands is labeled UM- followed by the first letter of its name and another unique letter if needed.) or with numbers. (Note: The following territories do not have ISO 3166-1 codes: 1: Akrotiri and Dhekelia 2: Ashmore and Cartier Islands 3: Coral Sea Islands) Colored areas without labels are integral parts of their respective countries. Antarctica is shown as a condominium instead of individual claims.

The Special Committee on Decolonization maintains the United Nations list of non-self-governing territories, which identifies areas the United Nations (though not without controversy) believes are colonies. Given that dependent territories have varying degrees of autonomy and political power in the affairs of the controlling state, there is disagreement over the classification of "colony".

== See also ==
- Colonialism – Control by distant groups
  - Colonization – Establishment and development of settlements by people or animals
  - Decolonization – Undoing political, economic and cultural legacies of colonisation
  - Democratic peace theory – International relations theory
  - Exploitation colonialism – Process of extracting resources from the earth
  - Mission (station) – Organized effort to spread Christianity
  - Scramble for Africa – 1870s–1914 European colonisation of Africa
  - Settler colonialism – Colonialism which replaces natives with settlers
  - United Nations list of non-self-governing territories – Type of territory defined by the United Nations Charter
- Diplomatic mission – Representatives of one state in another

Settlements and outposts (civilian and military)

- Border outpost – Outpost maintained by a sovereign state on its border
- Human outpost – Human habitats located in environments inhospitable for humans
- Outpost (military) – Location where detachments are stationed
- Bridgehead – Strategically important position on a river crossing which enemy forces seek to control
- Military base – Facility directly owned and operated by or for the military
- Military colony – Territory governed by another country
- Crossroads village
- Development town – Israeli towns established to house new immigrants
- Mill town – Settlement that developed around one or more mills or factories
- Railway town – Settlement developed when building a railway

Roads and road stops

- Caravanserei – Type of roadside inn
- Mountain pass – Route through a mountain range or over a ridge
- Stage station – Place of rest provided for stagecoach travelers
- Waypoint – Point on a route of travel

Trade and manufacturing areas

- Entrepôt – Hub for commercial activity
- Factory (trading post) – Type of medieval trading post
- Free-trade area – Regional trade agreement
- Free economic zone – Geographic area where economic activity between and within countries is less regulated
- Exclusive economic zone – Adjacent sea zone in which a state has special rights
- Special economic zone – Region with specialized business and trade laws
- Industrial park – Area for development of industry
- Spice Trade – Historic international commerce
- Trading post – Area where economic activity between peoples is less regulated

Frontiers and extraterritorial areas

- Border – Geographic boundaries of political entity
- Frontier – Area near or beyond a boundary
  - Frontier thesis – Argument by historian Frederick Jackson Turner
- No-go area – Term for areas considered off-limits or dangerous to enter
- No-mans land – Strip of land between wartime trenches
- Terra nullius – Principle of international law
