= Blasphemy law in Sri Lanka =

Law prohibiting blasphemy in Sri Lanka

Article 291A and 291B of the Penal Code of Sri Lanka restricts expressions made with the deliberate intent of hurting religious sentiments of a person. It carries a penalty of up to 2 years of imprisonment. Furthermore, the ICCPR Act and the Prevention of Terrorism Act has been used by the authorities to protect religion from criticism and insults.

== Article 291A and 291B ==
Whoever, with the deliberate intention of wounding the religious feelings of any person, utters any word or makes any sound in the hearing of that person, or makes any gesture in the sight of that person, or places any object in the sight of that person, shall be punished with imprisonment of either description for a term which may extend to one year, or with fine, or with both.

— Penal Code of Sri Lanka, Article 291A

Whoever, with the deliberate and malicious intention of outraging the religious feelings of any class of persons, by words, either spoken or written, or by visible representations, insults or attempts to insult the religion or the religious beliefs of that class, shall be punished with imprisonment of either description for a term which may extend to two years, or with fine, or with both.

— Penal Code of Sri Lanka, Article 291B

== ICCPR Act ==
Sri Lanka acceded to the International Covenant on Civil and Political Rights (ICCPR) on June 11, 1980. In 2007, the ICCPR Act was implemented to uphold the civil and political rights enshrined within the covenant. Sri Lankan authorities have been accused of abusing the Section 3 (1) of the ICCPR act to arrest individuals who have made allegedly defamatory statements about religion.

No person shall propagate war or advocate national, racial or religious hatred that constitutes incitement to discrimination, hostility or violence.

— International Covenant on Civil and Political Rights (ICCPR) Act, No. 56 of 2007, Section 3 (1)

== Notable cases ==
=== Naomi Coleman ===
On April 2014, Naomi Coleman, a British tourist, got arrested by the Sri Lankan Police for having a tattoo of Buddha on her arm. She was detained for four days, before being deported to the United Kingdom on April 24, 2014. Coleman sued the Sri Lankan authorities seeking 10 million rupees in compensation. On November 15, 2017, the Supreme Court of Sri Lanka concluded that Coleman's arrest and deportation was unlawful, and ordered her to be compensated by 800,000 rupees. The court further stated that Coleman had been subjected to "horrifying and scandalous treatment" by the police and prison officers.

=== Shakthika Sathkumara ===
On April 1, 2019, writer Shakthika Sathkumara was arrested by the Sri Lankan Police under allegations of defaming Buddhism in a short story he published on Facebook. The story contained references to child sexual abuse and homosexuality within Buddhist clergy. He was charged under the Section 3 of the ICCPR Act and Article 291B of the Penal Code, and was held in pre-trial detention for 127 days. Sathkumara was released under strict bail conditions on August 8, 2019, and the charges were ultimately dropped without an indictment on February 9, 2021. The arrest and detention was criticized by the human rights groups Amnesty International and Freedom Now, as well as the writers' association PEN International.

=== Nathasha Edirisooriya ===
Standup comedian Nathasha Edirisooriya was arrested by the Criminal Investigation Department of Sri Lankan Police on May 28, 2023, for allegedly making derogatory remarks on the Buddha during her show held on April 1, 2023. She was held in detention for more than a month, and on July 5, 2023, Colombo Fort magistrate ordered her to be further remanded until 12 July. However, following a petition filed on behalf of Edirisooriya, the Colombo High Court Judge Aditya Patabandige overruled the magistrate decision and ordered her to be released on a bail of Rs.100,000. Judge Patabandige concluded that the statements made by Edirisooriya did not constitute hate speech under the ICCPR Act.

=== Indika Thotawaththa ===
Astrologer Indika Thotawaththa was arrested by the Computer Crimes Division of Sri Lankan Police on October 6, 2023 for allegedly making defamatory statements damaging ethnic and religious harmony. He was released on October 20, 2023 under strict bail conditions.

=== Jerome Fernando ===
Jerome Fernando, a Christian pastor, was arrested on December 1, 2023 by the Criminal Investigation Department of the Sri Lankan Police. Fernando held a Sunday sermon on April 30, 2023, during which he allegedly insulted Buddhism, Hinduism and Islam. He was released on bail in January 2024, with restrictions on his travel and public statements regarding religion.
