= Shakthika Sathkumara =

Writer and civil servant

- Born: 1985/1986
- Occupations: Writer and civil servant

Shakthika Sathkumara (Sinhala: ශක්තික සත්කුමාර; born 1985/1986) is a writer and civil servant from Sri Lanka. He was charged under Section 3(1) of the ICCPR Act and Article 291(B) of the Penal Code of Sri Lanka, which covers propagating hatred and incitement of racial or religious violence, and faced up to ten years imprisonment. In February 2021, he was discharged.

== Background ==
Sathkumara is a non-fiction writer and poet. As well, he worked as an Economic Development Officer at the Polgahawela Divisional Secretariat Office before his arrest.

He published a short story to his Facebook account that included depictions of homosexual Buddhist monks and references of sexual abuse and pedophilia. A group of Buddhist monks felt that his story had insulted their religion and they went to the police with their complaints.

== 2019 arrest, detention, and release ==
Sathkumara was arrested by the Polgahawela Police on April 2, 2019. He was charged under Section 3(1) of the ICCPR Act and Art 291(B) of the Penal Code of Sri Lanka, which covers propagating hatred and incitement of racial or religious violence, and faced up to ten years imprisonment.

While the police investigated his case, Sathkumara was kept in pre-trial detention for 127 days. On February 9, 2021, he was released from the Polgahawela Magistrate Court without an indictment. His discharge occurred several days before the United Nations Human Rights Council sessions in Geneva.

=== International response ===
In July 2019, Amnesty International stated that "Shakthika Sathkumara is a prisoner of conscience and must be immediately and unconditionally released and all charges against him dropped,”.

In December 2019, human rights focused non-profit Freedom Now submitted a petition to the UN Working Group on Arbitrary Detention on behalf of Sathkumara. In May 2020, the Working Group determined that his detention was arbitrary and violated international law.

On January 13, 2020, PEN International stated that "Shakthika Sathkumara is being targeted solely for the peaceful exercise of his right to freedom of expression and calls for the investigation against him to be dropped".

== See also ==
- Blasphemy law in Sri Lanka
