= International Decades for the Eradication of Colonialism =

United Nations General Assembly designation

The United Nations General Assembly designated the years 2011–2020 as the Third International Decade for the Eradication of Colonialism, recalling that 2010 marked the fiftieth anniversary of the Declaration on the Granting of Independence to Colonial Countries and Peoples.

Previous similar decades were proclaimed for 1990–2000 as the First International Decade for the Eradication of Colonialism and 2001–2010 as the Second International Decade for the Eradication of Colonialism.

In 2020, the United Nations General Assembly proclaimed 2021–2030 as the Fourth International Decade for the Eradication of Colonialism via Resolution 75/123.

== See also ==
- Decolonization
- Special Committee on Decolonization
