= United Nations General Assembly Resolution 1541 (XV) =

UN General Assembly Resolution 1541 (XV)
- Date: 15 December 1960
- Meeting no.: fifteenth
- Code: A/RES/1541(XV) (Document)
- Subject: Principles which should guide members in determining whether or not an obligation exists to transmit the information called for under Article 73e of the Charter.
- Result: Adopted

United Nations General Assembly Resolution 1541 of 15 December 1960, titled "Principles which should guide members in determining whether or not an obligation exists to transmit the information called for under Article 73e of the Charter" was a resolution of the United Nations General Assembly during its fifteenth session with annexes of 12 principles, that affirmed that to ensure decolonisation, complete compliance with the principle of self-determination is required.

== Territorial integration ==
Principle VIII

Integration with an independent State should be on the basis of complete equality between the peoples of the erstwhile Non-Self-Governing Territory and those of the independent country with which it is integrated. The peoples of both territories should have equal status and rights of citizenship and equal guarantees of fundamental rights and freedoms without any distinction or discrimination; both should have equal rights and opportunities for representation and effective participation at all levels in the executive, legislative and judicial organs of government.

Principle IX

Integration should have come about in the following circumstances :

(a) The integrating territory should have attained an advanced stage of self-government with free political institutions, so that its peoples would have the capacity to make a responsible choice through informed and democratic processes;

(b) The integration should be the result of the freely expressed wishes of the territory's peoples acting with full knowledge of the change in their status, their wishes having been expressed through informed and democratic processes, impartially conducted and based on universal adult suffrage. The United Nations could, when it deems it necessary, supervise these processes.

== See also ==
- United Nations General Assembly Resolution 1514 (XV)
  A Declaration on the Granting of Independence to Colonial Countries and Peoples
- Decolonization
- Self-determination
