= United Nations General Assembly Resolution 1654 (XVI) =

UN General Assembly Resolution 1654
- Date: 27 November 1961
- Meeting no.: sixteenth
- Code: A/RES/1654(XVI) (Document)
- Subject: The situation with regard to the implementation of the Declaration on the Granting of Independence to Colonial Countries and Peoples.
- Voting summary: 97 voted for; None voted against; 4 abstained
- Result: Adopted

United Nations General Assembly Resolution 1654 of 27 November 1961, titled "The situation with regard to the implementation of the Declaration on the Granting of Independence to Colonial Countries and Peoples" was a resolution of the United Nations General Assembly during its sixteenth session. It reaffirmed the Declaration on the Granting of Independence to Colonial Countries and Peoples in Resolution 1514 (XV) of 14 December 1960.

== See also ==
- United Nations list of non-self-governing territories
- Decolonization
- Dependent territory
