= Chapter XI of the United Nations Charter =

Chapter XI of the United Nations Charter deals with non-self-governing territories.

The reference to "territories whose peoples have not yet attained a full measure of self-government" reflects the growing sense of inevitability with which the political independence of these countries was coming to be viewed. Specifically, Article 73 requires countries administering those colonies "to develop self-government, to take due account of the political aspirations of the peoples, and to assist them in the progressive development of their free political institutions." The other main goal elucidated by this chapter is the political, economical, social, and educational development of these countries. Article 74 refers to both administering countries and colonies as having similar duties to the community of nations: "Members of the United Nations also agree that their policy in respect of the territories to which this Chapter applies, no less than in respect of their metropolitan areas, must be based on the general principle of good-neighbourliness, due account being taken of the interests and well-being of the rest of the world, in social, economic, and commercial matters."

== Additional resolutions ==
Non-Self-Governing Territories have reached a full measure of self-government according to the United Nations General Assembly Resolution 1541 (XV), 1960:"Principles which should guide Members in determining whether or not an obligation exists to transmit the information called for under Article 73 e of the Charter" when they have:

- emerged as a sovereign independent State
- freely associated with an independent State
- integrated with an independent State

== See also ==
- United Nations list of non-self-governing territories
