= 1993 United States Virgin Islands status referendum =

Referendum in the U.S. Virgin Islands

- October 11, 1993

Results
Choice	Votes	%
Continued or Enhanced Territorial Status	8,629	81.60%
Complete Integration with the United States	1,421	13.44%
Removal of United States Sovereignty	525	4.96%
Valid votes	10,575	98.54%
Invalid or blank votes	157	1.46%
Total votes	10,732	100.00%
Registered voters/turnout	39,046	27.49%

A status referendum was held in the United States Virgin Islands on 11 October 1993. The option to maintain the status quo as a territory won, but the referendum was not legally valid as a majority of registered voters did not participate.

== Background ==
The United States purchased the Danish West Indies in 1917, and it became the insular area of the United States Virgin Islands. The United States Congress gave the territory the right to elect its own governor in 1968, and to elect a non-voting delegate in 1972.

A United Nations fact-finding mission reported that the U.S. Virgin Islands were not a self-governing territory and called for a referendum on its political status. Governor Alexander Farrelly and the Legislature of the Virgin Islands created a 17-member Status Commission in July 1988. A referendum was planned to be held in 1989, but was delayed due to Hurricane Hugo. The commission called for a referendum on the territory's future political status in 1993.

== Campaign ==
The initial vote was scheduled for September 7, 1993, but was moved to September 4 and then October 11. The three options for the referendum were continued or enhanced territorial status, complete integration with the United States, or ending United States sovereignty. Ending American sovereignty would result in either the U.S. Virgin Islands becoming independent or an associated state. If none of the options received a majority then a runoff between the two most supported options would be held.

A majority of registered voters were required to participate for the referendum to be legally valid. Only 27.5% of voters participated. Angel Suarez Jr., a member of the Status Commission, stated that voters were more concerned about the economy and crime than the political status of the territory.

== Endorsements ==
Status quo

Territory officials

- Alexander Farrelly, 4th Governor of the United States Virgin Islands (1987–1995)

Delegates

- Ron de Lugo, delegate to the United States House of Representatives from United States Virgin Islands' at-large congressional district (1973–1979, 1981–1995)

== Results ==
Choice	Votes	%
United States territory	8,629	81.60
Integration with the U.S.	1,421	13.44
Independence	525	4.96
Total	10,575	100.00
Valid votes	10,575	98.54
Invalid/blank votes	157	1.46
Total votes	10,732	100.00
Registered voters/turnout	39,046	27.49

== Works cited ==
=== News ===
- "Virgin Islanders to vote Sept. 4 on status choice". Miami Herald. August 5, 1993. p. 24A – via Newspapers.com.
- "Virgin Islands voters show their apathy". Green Bay Press-Gazette. October 12, 1993. p. A6 – via Newspapers.com.
- Steif, William (January 11, 1993). "Virgin Islanders face referendum". Miami Herald. p. 14A – via Newspapers.com.

=== Web ===
- "United States Virgin Islands: Working paper prepared by the Secretariat". United Nations Digital Library. June 19, 1996. Archived from the original on May 29, 2026.
- "U.S. Insular Areas Application of the U.S. Constitution" (PDF). United States Government Accountability Office. 1997. Archived from the original (PDF) on February 29, 2020.
- Sekou, Malik (1994). "The Failures of the Political Status Process in the U.S. Virgin Islands" (PDF). University of Florida. Archived from the original (PDF) on November 3, 2025.
