= Penal Code of Sri Lanka =

Penal Code (Ordinance No. 2 of 1883).
- Territorial extent: Sri Lanka
- Enacted: 1883

Amended by
- Penal Code (Amendment) Act, No. 22 of 1993., Penal Code (Amendment) Act, No. 16 of 2006
- Status: Amended

Penal Code (Ordinance No. 2 of 1883) enacts the Criminal and Penal law of Sri Lanka. The Act/Law was adopted in 1883. There were two amendments carried out as Penal Code (Amendment) Act, No. 22 of 1993., Penal Code (Amendment) Act, No. 16 of 2006.

== Structure ==
The Penal Code has 22 Chapters and 490 Sections

Penal Code of Sri Lanka (Sections 1 to 490)
Chapter	Sections Covered	Classification of offences
CHAPTER I	1 -4	
CHAPTER II	5 - 51	GENERAL EXPLANATIONS
CHAPTER III	52 - 68	OF PUNISHMENTS
CHAPTER IV	69 - 99	GENERAL EXCEPTIONS, OF THE RIGHT OF PRIVATE DEFENCE
CHAPTER V	100 - 113	OF ABETMENT
CHAPTER V A	113A - 113B	OF CONSPIRACY
CHAPTER VI	114 - 127	OF OFFENCES AGAINST THE STATE,
CHAPTER VII	128 - 137	OF OFFENCES RELATING TO THE ARMY, NAVY, AND AIR FORCE
CHAPTER VIII	138 - 157	OF OFFENCES AGAINST THE PUBLIC TRANQUILLITY,
CHAPTER IX	158 - 169	OF OFFENCES BY OR RELATING TO PUBLIC SERVANTS,
CHAPTER IXA	169A - 169H	OF OFFENCES RELATING TO ELECTIONS
CHAPTER X	170 - 187	OF CONTEMPTS OF THE LAWFUL AUTHORITY OF PUBLIC SERVANTS
CHAPTER XI	188 - 224	OF FALSE EVIDENCE AND OFFENCES AGAINST PUBLIC JUSTICE
CHAPTER XII	225 - 256A	OF OFFENCES RELATING TO COIN AND GOVERNMENT STAMPS
CHAPTER XIII	257 - 260	OF OFFENCES RELATING TO WEIGHTS AND MEASURES
CHAPTER XIV	261 - 289	OF OFFENCES AFFECTING THE PUBLIC HEALTH, SAFETY, CONVENIENCE, DECENCY AND MORALS
CHAPTER XV	290 - 292	OF OFFENCES RELATING TO RELIGION
CHAPTER XVI	293 - 365	OF OFFENCES AFFECTING THE HUMAN BODY
CHAPTER XVII	366 - 451	OF OFFENCES AGAINST PROPERTY OF THEFT, OF EXTORTION, OF ROBBERY, OF CRIMINAL MISAPPROPRIATION OF PROPERTY, OF CRIMINAL BREACH OF TRUST, OF THE RECEIVING OF STOLEN PROPERTY, OF CHEATING, OF FRAUDULENT DEEDS AND DISPOSITIONS OF PROPERTY, OF MISCHIEF AND ILLEGAL REMOVAL OF WRECKS, OF CRIMINAL TRESPASS
CHAPTER-XVIII	452 - 478D	OF OFFENCES RELATING TO DOCUMENTS, PROPERTY-MARKS, CURRENCY NOTES AND BANK NOTES, OF PROPERTY-MARKS, OF CURRENCY NOTES AND BANK NOTES
CHAPTER XIX	NA	(REPEALED)
CHAPTER XX	483 - 488	OF CRIMINAL INTIMIDATION, INSULT, AND ANNOYANCE
CHAPTER XXI	489	OF UNLAWFUL OATHS
CHAPTER XXII	490	OF ATTEMPTS TO COMMIT OFFENCES
