= Declaration on the Granting of Independence to Colonial Countries and Peoples =

United Nations General Assembly resolution adopted in 1960

UN General Assembly Resolution 1514 (XV)
- UN General Assembly vote on Resolution 1514 (XV) voted in favour abstained dependent territories and colonies Non-Member States
- Date: 14 December 1960
- Meeting no.: 15
- Code: A/RES/1514(XV) ([Resolution 1514 (XV) Document])
- Subject: Declaration on the Granting of Independence to Colonial Countries and Peoples.
- Voting summary: 89 voted for; None voted against; 9 abstained
- Result: Adopted

The Declaration on the Granting of Independence to Colonial Countries and Peoples, also known as the United Nations General Assembly Resolution 1514, was a resolution of the United Nations General Assembly during its fifteenth session that affirmed independence for countries and peoples under colonial rule.

The declaration characterized foreign rule as a violation of human rights, affirmed the right to self-determination, and called for an end to colonial rule. Adom Getachew writes, "Within fifteen years, anticolonial nationalists had successfully captured the UN and transformed the General Assembly into a platform for the international politics of decolonization." According to Christian Reus-Smit, the resolution "produced a tectonic shift in international legitimacy", as it "successfully undermined the institution of empire."

It was adopted by the UN General Assembly on December 14, 1960. 89 countries voted in favour, none voted against, and nine abstained: Australia, Belgium, Dominican Republic, France, Portugal, Spain, Union of South Africa, United Kingdom, and United States.

The Declaration is cited by International Convention on the Elimination of All Forms of Racial Discrimination.

== Context ==
A declaration on decolonization was first proposed by the Soviet Union, calling for the rapid independence of the remaining colonies. However a number of states considered that too rapid a decolonization would lead to chaos in those former colonies, so they resolved to bring the matter more rapidly to the General Assembly. Forty-three Asian and African states brought forward this compromise declaration which called for "immediate steps to be taken", which had many possible interpretations short of rapid decolonization.

The United States had long encouraged decolonization, and was expected to support the declaration, but abstained as a result of pressure from the United Kingdom. Despite abstaining, one U.S. representative, Zelma George, led an ovation after the vote. Many states felt the U.S. had let them down.

Many European and NATO states had voted for the declaration, so there was not a broad Western position on it. The United Kingdom, with most remaining colonies, thought the declaration was an implied criticism of it, and also there should be a period of proper preparation for independence. While having limited influence on other delegates, the UK views influenced the U.S. vote, which was escalated to a final decision by President Eisenhower. U.S. Ambassador James Wadsworth in his speech explained that they agreed with the overall objective but there were "difficulties in the language and thought" and raised various technical issues. Senator Wayne Morse characterized it in one instance as "the United States State Department bent over backwards to read the paragraph incorrectly".

== Legacy ==
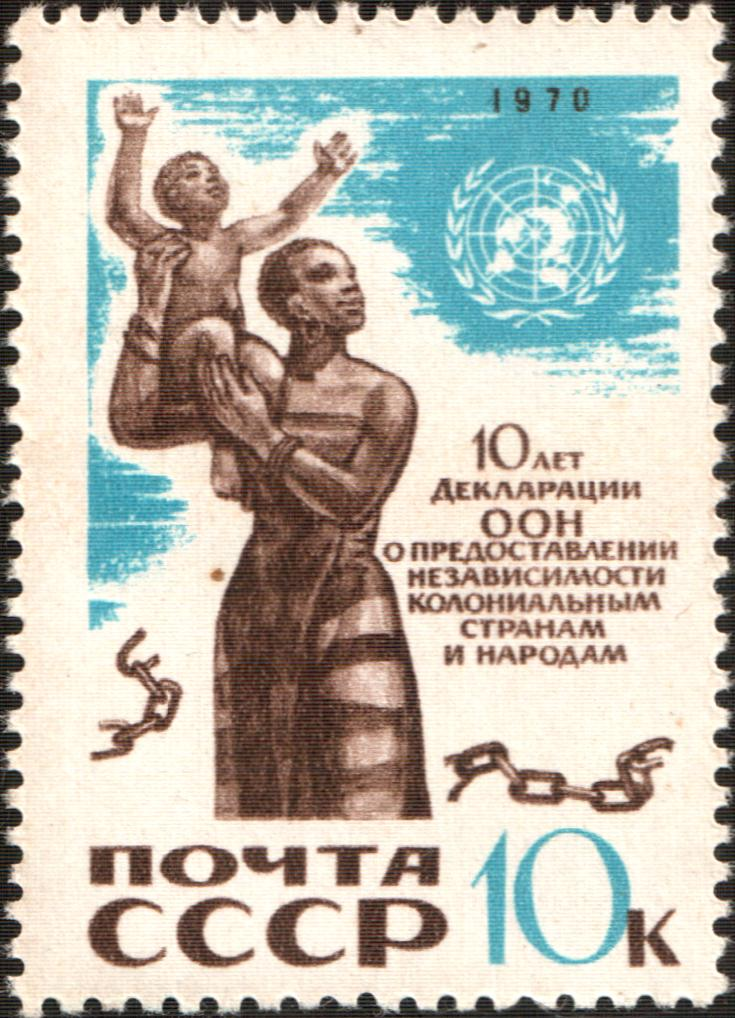
Soviet stamp commemorating the 10th anniversary of Resolution 1514

The declaration was a milestone in the process of decolonization.

In 2000, on the occasion of the 40th anniversary of Resolution 1514, UN General Assembly adopted Resolution 55/146 that declared 2001–2010 the Second International Decade for the Eradication of Colonialism. This follows on from 1990 to 2000 having been the International Decade for the Eradication of Colonialism.

== See also ==
- United Nations list of non-self-governing territories
- Dependent territory
- United Nations General Assembly Resolution 1654 (XVI)
