= 30th House of Representatives of Puerto Rico =

Lower house of the 18th Legislative Assembly of Puerto Rico

In session
- January 2, 2017 – January 1, 2021

Leadership
- Speaker: Carlos Johnny Méndez
- Speaker pro tem: José Pichy Torres Zamora
- Majority Leader: Gabriel Rodríguez Aguiló
- Majority Whip: Urayoán Hernández
- Minority Leader: Rafael Hernández Montañez
- Minority Whip: Ramón Luis Cruz

Structure
- Seats: 51 voting members
- Parties represented: 34 PNP; 16 PPD; 1 PIP
- Length of term: 4 years

Elections
- Last election: November 8, 2016
- Next election: November 3, 2020

Legislature
- 18th Legislative Assembly of Puerto Rico

Upper house
- 26th Senate of Puerto Rico

Sessions
- 1st: January 14, 2017 – June 30, 2017
- 2nd: August 19, 2017 – November 19, 2017
- 3rd: January 13, 2018 – June 30, 2018
- 4th: August 18, 2018 – November 18, 2018
- 5th: January 12, 2019 – June 30, 2019
- 6th: August 17, 2019 – November 17, 2019
- 7th: January 11, 2020 – June 30, 2020
- 8th: August 15, 2020 – November 15, 2020

The 30th House of Representatives of Puerto Rico is the lower house of the 18th Legislative Assembly of Puerto Rico and met from January 2, 2017, to January 1, 2021. All members were elected in the General Elections of 2016. The House had a majority of members from the New Progressive Party (PNP).

The body was counterparted by the 26th Senate of Puerto Rico in the upper house.

== Composition ==
=== Leadership ===
PNP PPD PIP
| Office | Representative | District | Party |
|---|---|---|---|
| Speaker | Johnny Méndez | District 36 | PNP |
| Speaker pro tem | José Pichy Torres Zamora | At-large | PNP |
| Majority Leader | Gabriel Rodríguez Aguiló | District 13 | PNP |
| Majority Whip | Urayoán Hernández | District 26 | PNP |
| Minority Leader | Rafael Hernández Montañez | District 11 | PPD |
| Minority Whip | Ramón Luis Cruz | District 34 | PPD |
| Minority Leader | Denis Márquez Lebrón | At-large | PIP |

=== Non-officers ===
| Post | Name |
|---|---|
| Secretary | Elizabeth Stuart Villanueva |
| Sergeant-at-Arms | Henry Tallaboa Collazo |

=== Members ===
PNP PPD PIP
| District | Name | Political party |
|---|---|---|
| District 1 | Eddie Charbonier Chinea | PNP |
| District 2 | Luis Raúl Torres | PPD |
| District 3 | Juan O. Morales Rodríguez | PNP |
| District 4 | Víctor Parés | PNP |
| District 5 | Jorge Navarro Suárez | PNP |
| District 6 | Antonio "Tony" Soto | PNP |
| District 7 | Luis Pérez Ortiz | PNP |
| District 8 | Yashira Lebrón Rodríguez | PNP |
| District 9 | Nelson del Valle | PNP |
| District 10 | Pedro Julio Santiago | PNP |
| District 11 | Rafael "Tatito" Hernández | PPD |
| District 12 | Guillermo (Guillo) Miranda Rivera | PNP |
| District 13 | Gabriel Rodríguez Aguiló | PNP |
| District 14 | José O. González Mercado | PNP |
| District 15 | Joel I. Franqui Atiles | PNP |
| District 16 | Félix G. Lassalle Toro | PNP |
| District 17 | Wilson Román López | PNP |
| District 18 | José (Che) Pérez Cordero | PNP |
| District 19 | Maricarmen Mas Rodríguez | PNP |
| District 20 | Carlos Bianchi Angleró | PPD |
| District 21 | Lydia Méndez Silva | PPD |
| District 22 | Michael A. Quiñones Irizarry | PNP |
| District 23 | Víctor M. Torres | PNP |
| District 24 | José A. Banchs Alemán | PNP |
| District 25 | Jacqueline Rodríguez Hernández | PNP |
| District 26 | Urayoán Hernández | PNP |
| District 27 | Manuel O. Claudio | PNP |
| District 28 | Rafael "June" Rivera | PNP |
| District 29 | José Aníbal Díaz | PPD |
| District 30 | Luis "Narmito" Ortíz | PPD |
| District 31 | Jesús Santa Rodríguez | PPD |
| District 32 | José "Conny" Varela | PPD |
| District 33 | Ángel Peña | PNP |
| District 34 | Ramón Luis Cruz | PPD |
| District 35 | Reynaldo Vargas | PNP |
| District 36 | Carlos "Johnny" Méndez | PNP |
| District 37 | Ángel Bulerín | PNP |
| District 38 | Javier Aponte Dalmau | PPD |
| District 39 | Roberto Rivera Ruíz | PPD |
| District 40 | Angel Matos García | PPD |
| At-large | Néstor A. Alonso Vega | PNP |
| At-large | José Aponte Hernández | PNP |
| At-large | José "Quiquito" Meléndez | PNP |
| At-large | Lourdes Ramos | PNP |
| At-large | María Milagros Charbonier | PNP |
| At-large | Brenda López de Arrarás | PPD |
| At-large | Luis Vega Ramos | PPD |
| At-large | Jesús Manuel Ortiz González | PPD |
| At-large | Denis Márquez | PIP |
| At-large | Manuel Natal | Independent |

=== Changes in membership ===
- July 31, 2018: José Luis Rivera Guerra resigns from his position as representative from the 17th district.
- October 31, 2018: Wilson Román López fills the vacancy left by José Luis Rivera Guerra as representative for District 17th for the New Progressive Party (PNP).

== Commissions ==
=== Standing commissions ===
| Name | President | Vice President | Secretary |
|---|---|---|---|
| Agriculture, Natural Resources, and Environmental Affairs | Joel I. Franqui Atiles | Félix G. Lassalle Toro | Michael A. Quiñones Irizarry |
| Calendars and Special Rules of Debate | Gabriel Rodríguez Aguiló | Urayoán Hernández Alvarado | José E. Torres Zamora |
| Consumer, Banking and Insurance Affairs | Yashira Lebrón Rodríguez | Victor L. Parés Otero | Néstor A. Alonso Vega |
| Cooperatives | José A. Banchs Alemán | Juan O. Morales Rodríguez | Yashira Lebrón Rodríguez |
| Development of the Capital City and Youth Affairs | Eddie Charbonier Chinea | Jorge Navarro Suárez | Juan O. Morales Rodríguez |
| Economic Development Planning, Telecommunications, Public-Private Partnerships and Energy | Victor L. Parés Otero | Antonio L. Soto Torres | Eddie Charbonier Chinea |
| Education, Arts and Culture | Guillermo Miranda Rivera | Rafael Rivera Ortega | Angel R. Peña Ramírez |
| Ethics | José A. Banchs Alemán | Luis Pérez Ortiz | Samuel Pagán Cuadrado |
| Federal, International and Status Affairs | José F. Aponte Hernández | José E. Meléndez Ortiz | María M. Charbonier Laureano |
| Government | Jorge Navarro Suárez | Antonio L. Soto Torres | Angel R. Peña Ramírez |
| Health | Juan O. Morales Rodríguez | María M. Charbonier Laureano | Néstor A. Alonso Vega |
| Housing and Urban Development | Luis Pérez Ortiz | Jacqueline Rodríguez Hernández | Angel Bulerín Ramos |
| Integrated Development of the Eastern Region | Angel R. Peña Ramírez | Samuel Pagán Cuadrado | María M. Charbonier Laureano |
| Integrated Development of the Northeastern Region | Samuel Pagán Cuadrado | Angel R. Peña Ramírez | María de Lourdes Ramos Rivera |
| Integrated Development of the North Central Region | Michael A. Quiñones Irizarry | Rafael Rivera Ortega | Félix G. Lassalle Toro |
| Integrated Development of the South Center Region | Ramón L. Rodríguez Ruiz | Jacqueline Rodríguez Hernández | José A. Banchs Alemán |
| Integrated Development of the Southern Region | Jacqueline Rodríguez Hernández | Víctor M. Torres González | José A. Banchs Alemán |
| Integrated Development of the Western Region | Maricarmen Mas Rodríguez | José J. Pérez Cordero | José Luis Rivera Guerra |
| Internal Affairs | Pedro J. Santiago Guzman | Angel Bulerín Ramos | Angel R. Peña Ramírez |
| Judiciary | María M. Charbonier Laureano | José E. Meléndez Ortiz | Angel R. Peña Ramírez |
| Labor Affairs | Angel R. Peña Ramírez | Michael A. Quiñones Irizarry | Yashira Lebrón Rodríguez |
| Municipal Affairs and Regionalization | José O. González Mercado | Víctor M. Torres González | Yashira Lebrón Rodríguez |
| Public Safety | Félix G. Lassalle Toro | Luis Pérez Ortiz | Eddie Charbonier Chinea |
| Retirement System and Veteran Affairs | María de Lourdes Ramos Rivera | Guillermo Miranda Rivera | Maricarmen Mas Rodríguez |
| Small and Medium Businesses, and Commerce | Nelson Del Valle Colón | Joel I. Franqui Atiles | Jorge Navarro Suárez |
| Social Welfare and Tourism | Néstor A. Alonso Vega | Eddie Charbonier Chinea | Guillermo Miranda Rivera |
| Special Needs Education and People with Disabilities | Rafael Rivera Ortega | Néstor A. Alonso Vega | Guillermo Miranda Rivera |
| Transportation and Infrastructure | José Luis Rivera Guerra | Luis Pérez Ortiz | Félix G. Lassalle Toro |
| Treasury, Budget and Supervision, Management, and Economic Stability of Puerto Rico (PROMESA) | Antonio L. Soto Torres | Luis Pérez Ortiz | Eddie Charbonier Chinea |
| Women's Affairs | María de Lourdes Ramos Rivera | Yashira Lebrón Rodríguez | Pedro J. Santiago Guzman |
| Youth Affairs, Recreation and Sports | José J. Pérez Cordero | Ramón L. Rodríguez Ruiz | Félix G. Lassalle Toro |

=== Joint commissions ===
| Name | President | Vice President | Secretary |
|---|---|---|---|
| Córdova Fernós Program of Congressional Internships | Eddie Charbonier Chinea | | |
| Continuous Revision of the Penal Code and for the Reform of Criminal Laws | María M. Charbonier Laureano | José E. Meléndez Ortiz | José E. Torres Zamora |
| Jorge Alberto Ramos Comas Legislative Internship Program | Eddie Charbonier Chinea | | |
| Legislative Donations | Antonio L. Soto Torres | Juan O. Morales Rodríguez | Luis Pérez Ortiz |
| Public-Private Partnerships of Puerto Rico | Larry Seilhamer | | |
| Special Reports from the Comptroller | José A. Banchs Alemán | Maricarmen Mas Rodríguez | Angel R. Peña Ramírez |
