= 27th House of Representatives of Puerto Rico =

Lower house of the 15th Legislative Assembly of Puerto Rico

In session
- January 2, 2005 – January 1, 2009

Leadership
- Speaker: José Aponte Hernández
- Speaker pro tem: Epifanio Jiménez
- Majority Leader: Iris Miriam Ruiz
- Minority Leader: Héctor Ferrer; Víctor García San Inocencio

Non-officers

Structure
- Seats: 51 voting members
- Parties represented: PNP; PPD; PIP

Elections

Legislature
- 15th Legislative Assembly of Puerto Rico

Upper house
- 23rd Senate of Puerto Rico

Sessions
- 1st: January 14, 2005 – January 12, 2006
- 2nd: January 13, 2006 – January 11, 2007
- 3rd: January 12, 2007 – January 10, 2008
- 4th: January 11, 2008 – January 8, 2009
- {{{session5}}}: {{{session5start}}} – {{{session5end}}}
- {{{session6}}}: {{{session6start}}} – {{{session6end}}}
- {{{session7}}}: {{{session7start}}} – {{{session7end}}}
- {{{session8}}}: {{{session8start}}} – {{{session8end}}}

The 27th House of Representatives of Puerto Rico was the lower house of the 15th Legislative Assembly of Puerto Rico and met from January 14, 2005, to January 8, 2009. All members were elected in the General Elections of 2004. The House had a majority of members from the New Progressive Party (PNP).

The body was counterparted by the 23rd Senate of Puerto Rico in the upper house.

== Leadership ==
Position	Name	Party	District
Speaker of the House	José Aponte Hernández	PNP	At-Large
Speaker Pro Tempore	Epifanio Jiménez	PNP	District 40
Majority Leader	Iris Miriam Ruiz	PNP	At-large
Majority Whip		PNP	
Minority Leader	Héctor Ferrer	PPD	At-large
Minority Whip		PPD	

== Current membership ==
District	Name	Party
1	Junior González	PNP
2	Luis Raúl Torres Cruz	PPD
3	Albita Rivera Ramírez	PNP
4	Liza Fernández Rodríguez	PNP
5	Jorge Navarro Suárez	PNP
6	Angel Perez Otero	PNP
7	Luis Pérez Ortíz	PNP
8	Antonio Silva Delgado	PNP
9	Nelson del Valle	PNP
10	Bernardo Márquez García	PNP
11	Javier García Cabán	PPD
12	Héctor Torres Calderón	PNP
13	Gabriel Rodríguez Aguiló	PNP
14	Carlos Molina	PNP
15	Efraín Concepción	PNP
16	Sergio Ortíz Quiñones	PPD
17	José Rivera Guerra	PNP
18	Tomás Bonilla Feliciano	PNP
19	Charlie Hernández	PPD
20	Norman Ramírez Rivera	PNP
21	Lydia Méndez Silva	PPD
22	Javier Rivera Aquino	PNP
23	Rafael García Colón	PPD
24	Roberto Cruz Rodríguez	PPD
25	Ramón Reyes	PPD
26	José Jiménez Negrón	PNP
27	Carmen Iris González	PPD
28	Rafael Rivera Ortega	PNP
29	Pedro Cintrón Rodríguez	PNP
30	Jorge Ramos Peña	PNP
31	Sylvia Rodríguez Aponte	PPD
32	José Varela Fernández	PPD
33	Angel Peña Rosa	PNP
34	Cristóbal Colón Ruiz	PNP
35	Joel Rosario Hernández	PPD
36	Carlos Méndez Nuñez	PNP
37	Angel Bulerín Ramos	PNP
38	Pedro A. Rodríguez	PPD
39	Roberto Rivera Ruiz	PPD
40	Epifanio Jiménez	PNP
At-Large	José Chico Vega	PNP
At-Large	Rolando Crespo	PNP
At-Large	Jenniffer González Colón	PNP
At-Large	María de Lourdes Ramos	PNP
At-Large	Iris Miriam Ruíz	PNP
At-Large	Héctor Ferrer	PPD
At-Large	Jorge Colberg Toro	PPD
At-Large	Ferdinand Pérez Román	PPD
At-Large	José Aponte Hernández	PNP
At-Large	Carlos Vizcarrondo Irizarry	PPD
At-Large	Víctor García San Inocencio	PIP
