= 15th Legislative Assembly of Puerto Rico =

Session of the Puerto Rico Legislature

The 15th Legislative Assembly of Puerto Rico met from January 2, 2005, to January 1, 2009. All members of the House of Representatives and the Senate were elected in the General Elections of 2004. The House and the Senate both had a majority of members from the New Progressive Party. It was the second time in Puerto Rican history in which the majority of the Assembly was from a different party than of the Governor of Puerto Rico.

Meetings were held regarding the political status of Puerto Rico.

== Major legislation ==
- Tax Justice Act (Ley de Justicia Contributiva), also known as the Puerto Rico tax reform.
- Government Fiscal Reform Act (Ley de Reforma Fiscal Gubernamental)

== Senate leadership ==
Office	Senator	Party	District
President	Kenneth McClintock	NPP	Elected as a Senator At-Large
Vice President	Orlando Parga	NPP	Elected as a Senator At-Large
Rules Committee Chair	Margarita Nolasco	NPP	District VI (House Districts 26-30) Guayama
Majority Leader	Margarita Nolasco	NPP	District VI (House Districts 26-30) Guayama
Minority Leader	Jose Luis Dalmau	PDP	District VII (House Districts 31-35) Humacao
Minority Leader	Maria de Lourdes Santiago	PIP	Elected as a Senator At-Large
Majority Whip	Carlos Pagán	NPP	District IV (House Districts 16-20) Mayagüez
Minority Whip	Sila Mari González Calderón	PDP	Elected as a Senator At-Large

== House leadership ==
Office	Representative	Party	District
Speaker of the House	Jose Aponte	NPP	Elected as a Representative At-Large
Speaker Pro Tem	Epifanio Jiménez	NPP	District 40 Carolina
Majority Leader	Iris Miriam Ruiz	NPP	Elected as a Representative At-Large
Minority Leader	Hector Ferrer	PDP	Elected as a Representative At-Large
Minority Leader	Víctor García San Inocencio	PIP	Elected as a Representative At-Large

== Members ==
Members of the 15th Legislative Assembly as of June 2005:

=== Senate ===
There are 17 NPP, 9 PDP, and 1 PIP in the higher chamber of the 15th Legislative Assembly

Senator	Party	District
Modesto Agosto Alicea	PDP	District Num. V (District 21-25) Ponce
Lucy Arce	NPP	Senator At-Large
Roberto Arango	NPP	District Num. I (District 1-5) San Juan
Eudaldo Baez Galib	PDP	Senator At-Large
Norma Burgos	NPP	Senator At-Large
Jose Luis Dalmau	PDP	District Num. VII (District 31-35) Humacao
Jorge de Castro Font	NPP	Senator At-Large
Carlos Díaz	NPP	District Num. I (District 1-5) San Juan
Antonio Fas Alzamora	PDP	Senator At-Large
Jose Garriga Pico	NPP	Senator At-Large
Sila Mari González Calderón	PDP	Senator At-Large
Jose Emilio Gonzalez Velazquez	NPP	District Num. III (District 11-15) Arecibo
Juan Hernandez Mayoral	PDP	Senator At-Large
Sixto Hernandez Serrano (resigned in 2006 upon confirmation as appeals judge)	PDP	District Num. VII (District 31-35) Humacao
Víctor David Loubriel (resigned during 2nd day in office)	NPP	District Num. II (District 11-15) Arecibo
Hector Martinez	NPP	District Num. VII (District 36-40) Carolina
Kenneth McClintock	NPP	Senator At-Large
Luis Daniel Muñiz	NPP	District Num. IV (District 16-20) Mayaguez
Margarita Nolasco	NPP	District Num. VI (District 26-30) Guayama
Carlos Pagan	NPP	District Num. IV (District 16-20) Mayaguez
Orlando Parga	NPP	Senator At-Large
Migdalia Padilla	NPP	District Num. II (District 6-10) Bayamón
Bruno Ramos	PDP	District Num. V (District 21-25) Ponce
Carmelo Ríos	NPP	District Num. II (District 6-10) Bayamón
Pedro Rosselló (Sworn in Feb. 13, 2005; selected to fill Sen. Loubriel's vacancy)	NPP	District Num. II (District 11-15) Arecibo
Maria de Lourdes Santiago	PIP	Senator At-Large
Lornna Soto	NPP	District Num. VII (District 36-40) Carolina
Jorge Suárez Cáceres (selected 2006 to fill Sen. Hernández Serrano's vacancy)	PDP	District Num. VII (District 31-35) Humacao
Cirilo Tirado	PDP	District Num. VI (District 26-30) Guayama

=== House of Representatives (incomplete) ===
Representative	Party	District
Francisco González	PNP	District Num. 1 San Juan
Luis Raúl Torres	PPD	District Num. 2 San Juan
Albita Rivera	PNP	District Num. 3 San Juan
Liza Fernandez	PNP	District Num. 4 San Juan
Jorge Navarro Suárez	PNP	District Num. 5 San Juan
Angel Pérez Otero	PNP	District Num. 6
Luis Pérez Ortíz	PNP	District Num. 7
Antonio Silva	PNP	District Num. 8
Nelson Del Valle	PNP	District Num. 9
Bernardo Márquez	PNP	District Num. 10
Jose Javier Garcia	PPD	District Num. 11
Hector A. Torres	PNP	District Num. 12
Gabriel Rodríguez Aguiló	PNP	District Num. 13
Carlos Molina	PNP	District Num. 14
Jose E. Concepción	PNP	District Num. 15
Sergio Ortiz	PPD	District Num. 16
José L. Rivera	PNP	District Num. 17
Julio C. Roman	PNP	District Num. 18
Carlos M. Hernandez	PPD	District Num. 19
Norman Ramírez	PNP	District Num. 20
Lydia Méndez	PPD	District Num. 21
Javier A. Rivera	PNP	District Num. 22
Rafael A. Garcia	PPD	District Num. 23
Roberto Cruz	PPD	District Num. 24
Ramon A. Reyes	PPD	District Num. 25
Jose L. Jimenez	PNP	District Num. 26
Carmen I. Gonzalez	PPD	District Num. 27
Rafael Rivera Ortega	PNP	District Num. 28
Pedro I. Cintron	PNP	District Num. 29
Jorge L. Ramos	PNP	District Num. 30
Sylvia Rodríguez	PPD	District Num. 31
José "Conny" Varela	PNP	District Num. 32
Angel R. Peña	PNP	District Num. 33
Cristóbal Colón Ruiz	PNP	District Num. 34
Joel Rosario	PPD	District Num. 35
Carlos Mendez	PNP	District Num. 36
Angel Bulerín	PNP	District Num. 37
Pedro A. Rodríguez	PPD	District Num. 38
Roberto Rivera Ruiz	PPD	District Num. 39
Epifanio Jiménez	PNP	District Num. 40
Jose F. Aponte	PNP	Representative At-Large
Iris Miriam Ruiz	PNP	Representative At-Large
María de Lourdes Ramos	PNP	Representative At-Large
Jenniffer González	PNP	Representative At-Large
José Chico Vega	PNP	Representative At-Large
Rolando Crespo	PNP	Representative At-Large
Héctor Ferrer	PPD	Representative At-Large
Carlos Vizcarrondo	PPD	Representative At-Large
Ferdinand Pérez	PPD	Representative At-Large
Jorge Colberg Toro	PPD	Representative At-Large
Víctor García San Inocencio	PIP	Representative At-Large

== Changes in membership ==
=== Senate ===
District	Former senator	Reason for change	Successor	Date of successor's installation
III - Arecibo	Víctor David Loubriel	Resigned January 4, 2005 (2 days after being sworn in)	Pedro Rosselló	February 13, 2005
VII - Humacao	Sixto Hernández Serrano	Resigned August 16, 2006 after being confirmed as an appeals judge.	Jorge Suárez Cáceres	August 31, 2006

== Changes in leadership ==
- June 6, 2005: Margarita Nolasco substitutes Jorge de Castro Font as Majority Leader of the Senate. De Castro retains most powers as Rules Committee Chair.
- June 6, 2005: Carlos Pagán substitutes Margarita Nolasco as Majority Whip of the Senate.
- March 11, 2008: Jorge de Castro Font substitutes Margarita Nolasco as Majority Leader of the Senate.
- March 11, 2008: Margarita Nolasco replaces Carlos Pagán as Majority Whip of the Senate.
- August 24, 2008: Jorge de Castro Font announces he is stepping down as Majority Leader after his office and apartment are searched by the FBI the day before.
- August 27, 2008: Senate President Kenneth McClintock recognizes Margarita Nolasco as Majority Leader of the Senate.
- September, 2008, Carlos Pagán replaces Margarita Nolasco as Majority Whip

== Notes ==
This is not the first time that the majority of the Legislature has been of a party different from the governor. In 1969–1972, the NPP controlled the House, the PDP controlled the Senate and the Governor was the late Luis A. Ferré (NPP). Between 1981 and 1984 the Governor was Carlos Romero Barceló (NPP) and the Senate from 1981 to 1984, and the House from 1982 to 1984, were controlled by the PDP.

== See also ==
- List of Legislative Assemblies of Puerto Rico
