= 2018 Florida gubernatorial election =

- November 6, 2018
- Turnout: 62.6% (▲12.1 pp)
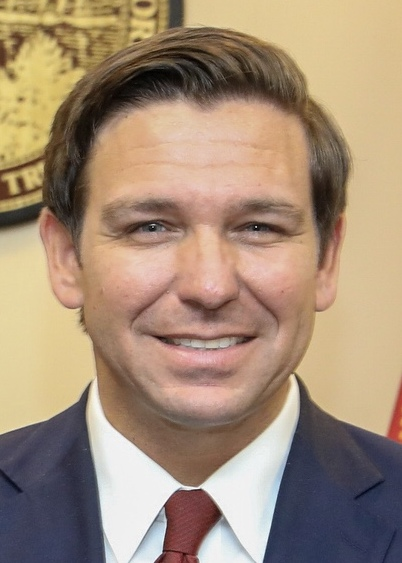

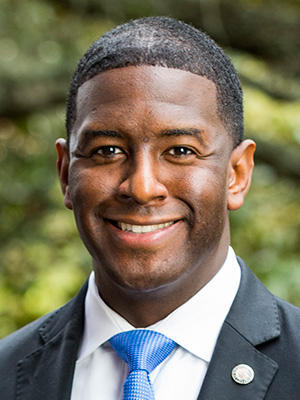
Nominee	Ron DeSantis	Andrew Gillum
Party	Republican	Democratic
Running mate	Jeanette Nuñez	Chris King
Popular vote	4,076,186	4,043,723
Percentage	49.59%	49.19%
- DeSantis: 40–50% 50–60% 60–70% 70–80% 80–90% >90% Gillum: 40–50% 50–60% 60–70% 70–80% 80–90% >90% Tie: 40–50% 50% No data
Governor before election
Rick Scott
Republican
Elected Governor
Ron DeSantis
Republican

The 2018 Florida gubernatorial election was held on November 6, 2018, to elect the next governor of Florida, alongside an election to the United States Senate, elections to the United States House of Representatives, and other state and local elections. Incumbent two-term Republican Governor Rick Scott was term-limited and could not run for a third term, and he successfully ran for Florida's Class I Senate seat.

Republican U.S. representative Ron DeSantis narrowly defeated Democratic mayor of Tallahassee Andrew Gillum for the governorship, in what some considered an upset. The candidate filing deadline was June 22, 2018, and primary elections were held on August 28. Florida uses a closed primary process, in which the selection of each party's candidates for a general election is limited to registered members of that party; Gillum won the Democratic primary and DeSantis the Republican primary.

The close margin mandated a machine recount, which had a deadline of November 15, 2018. After the recount was complete, DeSantis was certified as the winner. Gillum conceded on November 17. DeSantis's victory marked the sixth straight election in which Florida elected a Republican to the governorship, and the third in a row that neither candidate received over 50% of the vote. With a margin of 0.4%, this election was the closest race of the 2018 gubernatorial election cycle, and also the closest gubernatorial election in Florida history. Gillum became the first Democrat to win Duval County since 1986 and Seminole County since 1990, while DeSantis became the first Republican gubernatorial candidate to win Jefferson County since 1884.

== Republican primary ==
=== Nominee ===
- Ron DeSantis, U.S. representative from the 6th district and Iraq War veteran

=== Eliminated in primary ===
- Don Baldauf, contractor
- Timothy Devine, candidate for governor of Florida in 2014
- Bob Langford, attorney
- John Joseph Mercadante, Republican National Committee official
- Bruce Nathan, physical therapist and candidate for the U.S. Senate in 2016
- Adam Putnam, Florida commissioner of agriculture and former U.S. representative
- Bob White, chairman of the Republican Liberty Caucus of Florida

=== Withdrawn ===
- Issak Almaleh, notary
- Frederick Buntin, incarcerated felon
- Usha Jain, medical director
- Jack Latvala, former Florida state senator
- Armando Adames Rivas, banker
- Angel Rivera, businessman, political strategist
- Nathan Dale Wilson

=== Declined ===
- Jeff Atwater, former chief financial officer of Florida
- Pam Bondi, Florida attorney general (endorsed Putnam)
- Richard Corcoran, speaker of the Florida House of Representatives (endorsed Putnam)
- John Delaney, former mayor of Jacksonville
- Mike Huckabee, former governor of Arkansas and candidate for president in 2008 and in 2016
- Francis Rooney, U.S. representative
- Marco Rubio, U.S. senator from Florida and candidate for president in 2016
- Will Weatherford, former speaker of the Florida House of Representatives

=== Endorsements ===
Ron DeSantis

U.S. executive branch officials

- Donald Trump, 45th president of the United States
Adam Putnam

U.S. representatives

- Lincoln Díaz-Balart, former U.S. representative (FL-21)
- Steve Southerland, former U.S. representative (FL-2)

Statewide officials

- Pam Bondi, attorney general of Florida
- Richard Corcoran, state representative (District 37); speaker of the Florida House

State senators

- George Gainer

State representatives

- Allan Bense, former House speaker
- Jay Trumbull

Sheriffs

- Paul Blackman, Highlands County
- Chad Chronister, Hillsborough County
- Bob Gualtieri, Pinellas County
- Grady Judd, Polk County
- Tom Knight, Sarasota County
- Arnold Lanier, Hardee County
- Al Nienhuis, Hernando County
- Chris Nocco, Pasco County
- Rick Wells, Manatee County

Organizations

- Associated Builders and Contractors
- Associated Industries of Florida
- Florida Chamber of Commerce
- Florida Family Action
- Florida Fraternal Order of Police
- Florida Police Benevolent Association
- Florida Professional Firefighters

Newspapers

- Sun-Sentinel
- Tampa Bay Times
Jack Latvala (withdrawn)

U.S. representatives

- David Jolly, former U.S. representative (FL-13) and candidate for the U.S. Senate in 2016
Bob White

U.S. representatives

- Ron Paul, former U.S. representative from Texas and presidential candidate in 2008 and 2012

=== Polling ===
View source data.

Poll source	Date(s) administered	Sample size	Margin of error	Richard Corcoran	Ron DeSantis	Jack Latvala	Adam Putnam	Bob White	Other	Undecided
Gravis Marketing	August 21–25, 2018	579	± 4.1%	–	39%	–	27%	6%	4% (Note: Bruce Nathan with 4%)	23%
St. Pete Polls	August 22–23, 2018	2,141	± 2.1%	–	56%	–	33%	3%	–	8%
Gravis Marketing	August 21–22, 2018	321	± 5.5%	–	39%	–	24%	6%	4%	26%
Florida Atlantic University	August 16–20, 2018	222	± 6.5%	–	32%	–	31%	2%	13% (Note: Bruce Nathan 4%, Don Baldauf 3%, Timothy Devine 2%, someone else 4.5%)	22%
Saint Leo University	August 10–16, 2018	172	–	–	41%	–	52%	–	5%	–
SurveyUSA	August 10–13, 2018	558	± 5.2%	–	40%	–	38%	2%	5% (Note: Timothy Devine with 2%; Don Baldauf, Bob Langford, and Bruce Nathan with 1%; John Joseph Mercadante with 0%)	16%
North Star Opinion Research (R-DeSantis)	August 5–7, 2018	600	± 4.0%	–	50%	–	30%	–	–	–
Mason-Dixon	July 23–25, 2018	500	± 4.5%	–	41%	–	29%	0%	2% (Note: Bruce Nathan with 2%, Don Baldouf, Timothy Levine, Bob Langford, and John Joseph Mercadante with 0%)	28%
Florida Atlantic University	July 20–21, 2018	262	± 6.0%	–	36%	–	27%	3%	12% (Note: Bruce Nathan with 3%, Ellen Wilds with 2%, Timothy Devine and Armando Rivas with 1%, someone else with 5%)	23%
Clearview Research	July 14–19, 2018	700	± 4.0%	–	38%	–	39%	–	–	23%
St. Pete Polls	July 16–17, 2018	1,709	± 2.4%	–	50%	–	30%	4%	–	17%
Gravis Marketing	July 13–14, 2018	905	± 3.3%	–	35%	–	29%	4%	4% (Note: Armando Rivas with 4%)	25%
Fabrizio, Lee and Associates (R)	July 8–12, 2018	349	± 5.2%	–	42%	–	30%	–	–	27%
Remington (R-Tenth Amendment Project)	July 2–5, 2018	2,826	± 1.8%	–	43%	–	26%	–	–	25%
1892 Polling (R-DeSantis)	July 2, 2018	800	± 3.4%	–	47%	–	28%	–	–	25%
Marist College	June 17–21, 2018	326	± 6.7%	–	21%	–	38%	–	3%	39%
Fox News	June 15–19, 2018	901	± 3.0%	–	17%	–	32%	3%	5% (Note: Tim Devine, Ellen Wilds, Armando Rivas, and Bruce Nathan with 1%; Raphael Herman, Issak Almaleh, Joseph Mercadante, Frederick Dee Buntin, and Don Baldauf with <0.5%; Usha Jain with 0%; other with 1%)	39%
Gravis Marketing	May 31 – June 15, 2018	543	± 4.2%	4%	19%	–	29%	5%	–	43%
Cherry Communications	June 7–9, 2018	501	± 5.3%	–	15%	–	32%	–	5%	48%
Saint Leo University	May 25–31, 2018	175	–	–	13%	–	35%	–	9%	44%
Florida Atlantic University	May 4–7, 2018	371	± 5.0%	–	16%	–	15%	3%	24% (Note: David Adams 8%, Tim Devine 5%, Bruce Nathan 2%, Don Baldauf 1%, someone else 8%)	43%
1892 Polling (R-DeSantis)	April 19–23, 2018	800	± 3.4%	7%	30%	–	23%	–	–	40%
1892 Polling (R-DeSantis)	April 19–23, 2018	800	± 3.4%	–	30%	–	26%	–	–	44%
Gravis Marketing	February 26 – March 19, 2018	–	–	3%	19%	0%	17%	0%	–	60%
North Star Opinion Research (R-DeSantis)	March 12–15, 2018	600	–	<6%	21%	–	19%	–	–	–
North Star Opinion Research (R-DeSantis)	March 12–15, 2018	600	–	–	28%	–	23%	–	–	–
Saint Leo University	February 18–24, 2018	175	–	7%	14%	3%	15%	5%	9% (Note: Bruce Nathan 2%, Angel Luis Rivera 2%, someone else 5%)	46%
Big Data Poll	February 17–18, 2018	297	–	–	15%	0%	17%	5%	4% (Note: Angel Rivera with 4%)	60%
Gravis Marketing	February 1–18, 2018	–	–	3%	16%	0%	18%	2%	–	61%
Mason-Dixon	January 29 – February 1, 2018	500	± 4.5%	7%	23%	–	27%	–	–	43%
Remington	December 30–31, 2017	1,423	± 2.6%	3%	28%	–	25%	–	–	44%
Gravis Marketing	December 19–24, 2017	–	–	2%	12%	2%	23%	1%	–	60%
Saint Leo University	November 19–24, 2017	166	–	2%	5%	2%	15%	4%	10% (Note: Jackie Siegel 2%, Ron Bergeron 1%, Angel Luis Rivera 1%, Daniel Zutler 1%, someone else 5%)	63%
Cherry Communications	September 17–24, 2017	256	–	1%	9%	2%	26%	–	3%	59%
Saint Leo University	September 10–16, 2017	173	–	4%	7%	2%	20%	2%	11% (Note: Daniel Zutler 3%, Jackie Siegel 2%, Ron Bergeron 1%, Bruce Nathan 1%, Angel Luis Rivera 1%, Usha Jain 0%, someone else 3%)	44%
Florida Atlantic University	August 24–26, 2017	304	± 6.5%	10%	9%	2%	27%	–	–	53%

Hypothetical polling

Poll source	Date(s) administered	Sample size	Margin of error	Jeff Atwater	Rick Baker	Pam Bondi	Richard Corcoran	Mike Huckabee	Usha Jain	David Jolly	Jack Latvala	Adam Putnam	Will Weatherford	Other	Undecided
Gravis Marketing	March 28–29, 2017	–	–	–	2%	–	5%	–	–	5%	4%	21%	–	–	63%
Saint Leo University	March 3–11, 2017	175	–	–	6%	–	5%	30%	2%	–	3%	13%	–	8%	34%
Associated Industries of Florida	February 14–17, 2017	800	± 3.5%	–	–	–	4%	–	–	–	–	22%	–	–	71%
Cherry Communications	December 3–8, 2016	–	–	–	–	–	–	–	–	–	–	22%	–	–	64%
Saint Leo University	November 27–30, 2016	–	–	5%	1%	–	2%	32%	–	–	–	6%	1%	7%	47%
StPetePolls.org	August 2, 2016	1,835	± 2.3%	7%	3%	26%	1%	37%	–	–	–	8%	1%	7%	12%

=== Results ===
Results by county: DeSantis: DeSantis—40–50%; DeSantis—50–60%; DeSantis—60–70%; DeSantis—70–80%; Putnam: 40–50%; 50–60%; 60–70%; 70–80%

Republican primary results
Party	Candidate	Votes	%
Republican	Ron DeSantis	916,298	56.5%
Republican	Adam Putnam	592,518	36.5%
Republican	Bob White	32,710	2.0%
Republican	Timothy M. Devine	21,380	1.3%
Republican	Bob Langford	19,842	1.2%
Republican	Bruce Nathan	14,556	0.9%
Republican	Don Baldauf	13,173	0.8%
Republican	John Joseph Mercadante	11,647	0.7%
Total votes		1,622,124	100.0%

== Democratic primary ==
=== Nominee ===
- Andrew Gillum, mayor of Tallahassee

=== Eliminated in primary ===
- Gwen Graham, former U.S. representative and daughter of former U.S. senator and former governor Bob Graham
- Jeff Greene, real estate billionaire and candidate for the U.S. Senate in 2010
- Chris King, entrepreneur and founder of Elevation Financial Group
- Philip Levine, former mayor of Miami Beach
- Alex Lundmark, real estate agent
- John Wetherbee, entrepreneur

=== Withdrew ===
- Henry E. Davis, judge
- Richard Paul Dembinsky, candidate for U.S. representative in 2016 and candidate for governor in 2006
- Lucretia Fordyce, activist
- Josue Larose, perennial candidate
- Brooke Russell Locke Marx, notary
- Louis McClanahan, plant operator

=== Declined ===
- Bob Buckhorn, mayor of Tampa
- Kathy Castor, U.S. representative (ran for reelection)
- Charlie Crist, U.S. representative, former governor of Florida, and nominee for governor in 2014 (ran for reelection)
- Buddy Dyer, mayor of Orlando
- Rick Kriseman, mayor of St. Petersburg
- John Morgan, lawyer and medical marijuana advocate
- Patrick Murphy, former U.S. representative and nominee for the U.S. Senate in 2016
- Bill Nelson, U.S. senator (ran for reelection)
- Jeremy Ring, former Florida state senator (ran for CFO)
- Jack Seiler, mayor of Fort Lauderdale

=== Endorsements ===
Gwen Graham

U.S. senators

- Tammy Duckworth, U.S. senator from Illinois
- Kirsten Gillibrand, U.S. senator from New York
- Bob Graham, former governor of Florida and former U.S. senator from Florida, father of Gwen Graham

U.S. representatives

- Kathy Castor, U.S. representative (FL-14)
- Jim Davis, former U.S. representative (FL-11), Democratic nominee for governor in 2006
- Steny Hoyer, U.S. representative (MD-05), House minority whip
- David Jolly, former U.S. representative (Republican) (FL-13)
- John Lewis, U.S. representative (GA-05)
- Ted Lieu, U.S. representative (CA-35)
- Patrick Murphy, former U.S. representative (FL-18), Democratic nominee for U.S. Senate in 2016

Statewide officials

- Betty Castor, former Florida commissioner of education, former president of the University of South Florida, Democratic nominee for U.S. Senate in 2004
- Howard Dean, 79th governor of Vermont, Democratic candidate for president in 2004
- Alex Sink, former Florida chief financial officer, Democratic nominee for governor in 2010

State legislators

- Lori Berman, state senator (D-Lantana)
- Karen Castor Dentel, former state representative (D-Maitland)
- John Cortes, state representative (D-Kissimmee)
- Tracie Davis, state representative (D-Jacksonville)
- Ben Diamond, state representative (D-St. Petersburg)
- Dwight Dudley, former state representative (D-St. Petersburg)
- Katie Edwards, state representative (D-Plantation)
- Kristin Jacobs, state representative (D-Coconut Creek)
- Evan Jenne, state representative (D-Hollywood)
- Arthenia Joyner, former state senator (D-Tampa)
- Amy Mercado, state representative (D-Orlando)
- Jon L. Mills, former state representative (D-Gainesville), former State House speaker
- Jared Moskowitz, state representative (D-Coral Springs)
- Mark Pafford, former state representative (D-West Palm Beach), former State House minority leader
- Darryl Rouson, state senator (D-St. Petersburg)
- David Silvers, state representative (D-West Palm Beach)
- Kelly Skidmore, former state representative (D-Boca Raton)
- Emily Slosberg, state representative (D-Boca Raton)
- Richard Stark, state representative (D-Weston)
- Vic Torres, state senator (D-Orlando)
- Barbara Watson, state representative (D-Miami Gardens)
- Clovis Watson Jr., state representative (D-Gainesville)
- Matt Willhite, state representative (D-Wellington)

Mayors and other municipal leaders

- Shannon Blankenship, Duval County Soil and Water Conservation District chair
- Skip Campbell, mayor of Coral Springs
- John Dailey, Leon County commissioner
- Garrett Dennis, Jacksonville city councilman
- Kristin Dozier, Leon County commissioner
- Pat Frank, Hillsborough County clerk of courts
- Tabitha Frazier, Leon County Soil and Water Conservation district supervisor
- Shirley Freeman, former mayor of Monroe County
- Jake Godbold, former mayor of Jacksonville
- Pegeen Hanrahan, former mayor of Gainesville
- Tommy Hazouri, Jacksonville city councilman, former mayor of Jacksonville
- Warren Jones, Duval County School Board member
- Cindy Lerner, former mayor of Pinecrest
- Shanon Matiero, former City Commissioner of West Palm Beach
- Melissa McKinlay, mayor of Palm Beach County
- Barry Moss, Pompano Beach city commissioner
- Jeri Muoio, mayor of West Palm Beach
- Karl Nurse, former St. Petersburg city councilman
- Frank Ortis, mayor of Pembroke Pines
- Darden Rice, St. Petersburg city council chair
- Nan Rich, Broward County commissioner, Democratic candidate for governor in 2014
- Katy Sorenson, former Miami-Dade County commissioner
- Mike Suarez, Tampa city councilman
- Matt Surrency, mayor of Hawthorne
- Dean Trantalis, mayor of Fort Lauderdale
- Gil Ziffer, Tallahassee city commissioner

Individuals

- Jimmy Buffett, musician
- Alan Clendenin, DNC member, former Florida Democratic Party vice chair
- Wendy Davis, former Texas state senator, Democratic nominee for governor of Texas in 2014
- Manley Fuller, president of the Florida Wildlife Federation
- Alma Gonzalez, DNC member, former Florida Democratic Party treasurer

Organizations

- EMILY's List
- The Everglades Trust
- Florida Education Association
- Florida Police Benevolent Association
- International Association of Machinists and Aerospace Workers
- Ruth's List
- United Steelworkers

Newspaper editorial boards

- The Palm Beach Post
- Tampa Bay Times
Jeff Greene

Newspapers

- Sun-Sentinel
Chris King

State legislators

- Nick Duran, state representative (D-Miami)

Mayors and other municipal officials

- Linda Chapin, former mayor of Orange County
- Eddie Cole, mayor of Eatonville

Organizations

- American Federation of Government Employees
Philip Levine

Statewide officials

- Ed Rendell, 45th governor of Pennsylvania

State legislators

- Keith Fitzgerald, former state representative (D-Sarasota), Democratic nominee for U.S. House in 2012

Mayors and other municipal officials

- John Elizabeth Alemán, Miami Beach city commissioner
- Andy Amoroso, vice mayor of Lake Worth
- Ricky Arriola, Miami Beach city commissioner
- Carmen Yulín Cruz, mayor of San Juan, Puerto Rico
- Oliver Gilbert, mayor of Miami Gardens
- Justin Katz, Boynton Beach city commissioner
- Ken Keechl, former Broward County commissioner
- Alex Penelas, former mayor of Miami-Dade County
- Robert Shelley, Aventura city commissioner
- Glenn Singer, mayor of Golden Beach
- Micky Steinberg, Miami Beach city commissioner
- Enid Weisman, mayor of Aventura

Individuals

- Ray Allen, former NBA player
- Shaquille O'Neal, former NBA player, sports analyst

Newspaper editorial boards

- Miami Herald

=== Polling ===
Poll source	Date(s) administered	Sample size	Margin of error	Andrew Gillum	Gwen Graham	Jeff Greene	Chris King	Philip Levine	Other	Undecided
St. Pete Polls	August 25–26, 2018	2,342	± 2.0%	25%	32%	11%	2%	22%	4%	5%
Gravis Marketing	August 21–25, 2018	531	± 4.3%	16%	26%	19%	5%	18%	–	17%
Gravis Marketing	August 21–22, 2018	308	± 5.6%	15%	26%	19%	5%	18%	–	17%
Schroth, Eldon and Associates (D)	August 19–21, 2018	669	± 3.8%	18%	25%	13%	2%	26%	–	15%
Florida Atlantic University	August 16–20, 2018	280	± 6.3%	11%	29%	11%	10%	17%	3%	19%
Change Research (D-Gillum)	August 18–19, 2018	1,178	–	33%	22%	10%	–	22%	–	–
St. Pete Polls	August 18–19, 2018	2,202	± 2.1%	21%	27%	15%	3%	25%	4%	6%
Saint Leo University	August 10–16, 2018	188	–	15%	31%	17%	5%	22%	4%	–
Schroth, Eldon and Associates (D)	August 11–14, 2018	600	± 4.0%	15%	24%	13%	3%	27%	–	18%
SurveyUSA	August 10–13, 2018	631	± 5.2%	11%	22%	16%	3%	22%	2% (Note: Alex "Lundy" Lundmark and John Wetherbee with 1%)	24%
Public Policy Polling (D-Levine)	August 5–6, 2018	572	–	13%	26%	16%	4%	22%	–	19%
ALG Research (D-Graham)	July 29 – August 2, 2018	800	± 3.4%	10%	33%	13%	3%	17%	–	23%
St. Pete Polls	July 30–31, 2018	1,652	± 2.4%	12%	29%	23%	3%	19%	4%	9%
Mason-Dixon	July 23–25, 2018	500	± 4.5%	10%	27%	12%	7%	18%	1% (Note: Alex "Lundy" Lundmark with 1%, John Wetherbee with 0%)	25%
Florida Atlantic University	July 20–21, 2018	271	± 5.9%	7%	20%	14%	9%	16%	3%	31%
Associated Industries of Florida	July 16–18, 2018	800	–	12%	24%	13%	4%	16%	–	–
Frederick Polls	July 2018	506	–	15%	28%	23%	7%	27%	–	–
St. Pete Polls	July 14–15, 2018	1,314	± 2.7%	10%	22%	22%	3%	19%	1% (Note: Alex "Lundy" Lundmark and John Wetherbee with 0%)	25%
Gravis Marketing	July 13–14, 2018	1,540	± 2.5%	10%	27%	18%	–	17%	–	27%
Marist College	June 17–21, 2018	344	± 6.5%	8%	17%	4%	3%	19%	1%	47%
RABA Research	June 15–16, 2018	660	± 3.8%	8%	26%	3%	15%	27%	–	21%
Gravis Marketing	May 31 – June 15, 2018	485	± 4.5%	29%	24%	–	3%	17%	–	27%
Let's Preserve the American Dream	June 6–9, 2018	800	± 3.1%	11%	21%	3%	4%	24%	–	37%
Schroth, Eldon and Associates (D)	June 3–5, 2018	600	± 4.0%	11%	16%	4%	6%	32%	–	31%
Saint Leo University	May 25–31, 2018	195	–	10%	14%	–	6%	14%	9%	47%
Public Policy Polling (D-Levine)	May 21–22, 2018	583	–	12%	20%	–	6%	30%	–	33%
Change Research (D-Gillum)	May 8–11, 2018	1,107	± 3.0%	13%	13%	–	3%	20%	–	52%
Florida Atlantic University	May 4–7, 2018	372	± 3.0%	6%	15%	–	10%	16%	11% (Note: Louis McClanahan 2%, Josue Larose 1%, someone else 8%)	42%
Public Policy Polling (D-EDGE Comms.)	April 10–11, 2018	491	–	8%	23%	–	4%	29%	–	36%
Public Policy Polling	March 23–25, 2018	613	–	8%	19%	–	5%	22%	–	46%
Gravis Marketing	February 26 – March 19, 2018	–	–	11%	9%	2%	2%	13%	–	64%
Saint Leo University	February 18–24, 2018	190	–	10%	17%	5%	7%	8%	3%	50%
Gravis Marketing	February 1–18, 2018	–	–	9%	12%	1%	2%	12%	–	63%
Mason-Dixon	January 29 – February 1, 2018	500	± 4.5%	10%	20%	–	4%	17%	–	49%
Gravis Marketing	December 19–24, 2017	–	–	12%	18%	2%	3%	6%	–	60%

Hypothetical polling

Poll source	Date(s) administered	Sample size	Margin of error	Bob Buckhorn	Kathy Castor	Buddy Dyer	Andrew Gillum	Gwen Graham	Jeff Greene	Grant Hill	Chris King	Philip Levine	John Morgan	Patrick Murphy	Jeremy Ring	Katherine Fernandez Rundle	Jack Seiler	Other	Undecided
Frederick Polls	April 23–28, 2018	750	± 3.6%	–	–	–	6%	14%	–	–	2%	20%	–	14%	–	–	–	–	44%
Saint Leo University	November 19–24, 2017	181	–	–	2%	–	6%	9%	2%	2%	3%	2%	13%	–	–	5%	–	2%	53%
Cherry Communications	September 17–24, 2017	263	–	–	–	–	6%	16%	–	–	2%	4%	23%	–	–	–	–	4%	44%
Saint Leo University	September 10–16, 2017	190	–	–	3%	–	5%	7%	1%	4%	4%	1%	12%	13%	–	5%	–	3%	44%
Florida Atlantic University	August 24–26, 2017	297	± 6.5%	–	–	–	9%	14%	–	–	4%	8%	19%	–	–	–	–	–	47%
Gravis Marketing	April 4–10, 2017	–	–	–	–	–	13%	11%	1%	–	–	3%	–	14%	–	–	–	3%	55%
Gravis Marketing	March 28–29, 2017	–	–	–	–	–	23%	8%	0%	–	–	1%	9%	24%	–	–	–	–	36%
Saint Leo University	March 3–11, 2017	203	–	3%	5%	6%	4%	4%	–	–	–	5%	9%	20%	2%	–	2%	4%	40%
Cherry Communications	December 3–8, 2016	–	–	5%	–	–	8%	16%	–	–	–	5%	15%	–	–	–	–	4%	45%
Saint Leo University	November 27–30, 2016	–	–	5%	4%	5%	–	5%	–	–	–	3%	20%	–	1%	–	1%	7%	49%

=== Results ===
Results by county: Gillum: <30%; 30–40%; 40–50%; 50–60%; 60–70%; Graham: <30%; 30–40%; 40–50%; 50–60%; Levine: <30%; 30–40%; 40–50%

Democratic primary results
Party	Candidate	Votes	%
Democratic	Andrew Gillum	517,417	34.3%
Democratic	Gwen Graham	472,735	31.3%
Democratic	Philip Levine	306,450	20.3%
Democratic	Jeff Greene	151,935	10.1%
Democratic	Chris King	37,464	2.5%
Democratic	John Wetherbee	14,355	1.0%
Democratic	Alex "Lundy" Lundmark	8,628	0.6%
Total votes		1,508,984	100.0%

== Independent and third party candidates ==
=== Reform Party ===
==== Declared ====
- Darcy Richardson, author and candidate for president in 2012

=== Libertarian Party ===
==== Withdrawn ====
- Riquet Caballero, banker and Afro-Cuban activist (running for state representative)
- Randy Wiseman, former chair of the Lake County School Board, candidate for state representative in 2004, and candidate for mayor of Mount Dora in 2013

=== Constitution party ===
==== Withdrawn ====
- Daniel P. Zutler, businessman and candidate for president in 2016

=== Independents ===
==== Declared ====
- Ryan Christopher Foley, former emergency medical technician
- Kyle "KC" Gibson, pastor
- Bruce Stanley, environmental activist

==== Declined ====
- Grant Hill, former professional basketball player
- John Morgan, lawyer and medical marijuana advocate
- Ellen Marie Wilds, JPO supervisor (became Kyle "KC" Gibson's running mate)

==== Endorsements ====
Darcy Richardson (Reform Party)

Individuals

- Nancy Argenziano, former Florida state senator and public service commissioner
- Randy Wiseman, former Republican chair of the Lake County School Board
John Morgan (declined)

Individuals

- Snoop Dogg, rapper and actor
- Roger Stone, political activist and consultant

== General election ==
=== Debates ===
Dates	Location	DeSantis	Gillum	Link
October 21, 2018	Tampa, Florida	Participant	Participant	Full debate - C-SPAN
October 24, 2018	Weston, Florida	Participant	Participant	Full debate - C-SPAN

==== First debate ====
The first debate, moderated by CNN's Jake Tapper, was hosted on October 21, 2018, at WEDU, Tampa, Florida. It was an hour long debate featuring topics like climate change, minimum wage, health care, gun control, the NRA, DeSantis's "monkey up" comment and President Donald Trump being a role model for children.

This debate was held a day before early voting started in Florida on October 22, 2018.

==== Second debate ====
The second debate occurred on October 24, 2018, and was hosted in Weston, Florida. It was moderated by Leadership Florida and the Florida Press Association.

=== Endorsements ===
Andrew Gillum (D)

U.S. executive branch officials

- Joe Biden, 47th vice president of the United States
- Julian Castro, 16th U.S. secretary of Housing and Urban Development
- Eric Holder, 82nd United States attorney general
- Valerie Jarrett, former director of the Office of Public Engagement and Intergovernmental Affairs
- Barack Obama, 44th president of the United States

U.S. senators

- Cory Booker, U.S. senator (D-NJ)
- Bob Graham, former U.S. senator (D-FL) and former governor of Florida
- Kamala Harris, U.S. senator (D-CA)
- Jeff Merkley, U.S. senator (D-OR)
- Chris Murphy, U.S. senator (D-CT)
- Bill Nelson, U.S. senator (D-FL)
- Bernie Sanders, U.S. senator (I-VT)
- Elizabeth Warren, U.S. senator (D-MA)

U.S. representatives

- Kathy Castor, U.S. representative (FL-14)
- Charlie Crist, U.S. representative (FL-13) and former Republican governor of Florida
- Ted Deutch, U.S. representative (FL-22)
- Gwen Graham, former U.S. representative (FL-2) and former candidate
- Luis Gutiérrez, U.S. representative (IL-04)
- Alcee Hastings, U.S. representative (FL-20)
- David Jolly, former U.S. representative (Republican) (FL-13)
- Ro Khanna, U.S. representative (CA-17)
- Al Lawson, U.S. representative (FL-5)
- John Lewis, U.S. representative (GA-5)
- Patrick Murphy, former U.S. representative (FL-18)
- Stephanie Murphy, U.S. representative (FL-7)
- Adam Schiff, U.S. representative (CA-28)
- Darren Soto, U.S. representative (FL-9)
- Nydia Velázquez, U.S. representative (NY-7)
- Debbie Wasserman Schultz, U.S. representative (FL-23)
- Frederica Wilson, U.S. representative (FL-24)

State and territorial officials

- Aramis Ayala, state attorney for the Ninth Judicial Circuit Court of Florida
- Justin Fairfax, lieutenant governor of Virginia
- John Hickenlooper, governor of Colorado
- Jay Inslee, governor of Washington
- Terry McAuliffe, former governor of Virginia
- Phil Murphy, governor of New Jersey
- Ralph Northam, governor of Virginia
- Martin O'Malley, former governor of Maryland
- Ricardo Rosselló, governor of Puerto Rico
- Dave Zuckerman, lieutenant governor of Vermont

State legislators

- Joseph Abruzzo, state representative (D-Boynton Beach)
- Ramon Alexander, state representative (D-Tallahassee)
- Loranne Ausley, state representative (D-Tallahassee)
- Randolph Bracy, state senator (D-Orlando)
- Kamia Brown, state representative (D-Orlando)
- Dwight Bullard, former state senator (D-Miami)
- Jeff Clemens, former state senator (D-Lake Worth)
- Margaret Good, state representative (D-Sarasota
- Patrick Henry, state representative (D-Daytona Beach)
- Tony Hill, former state senator (D-Jacksonville)
- Al Jacquet, state representative (D-Lantana)
- Mia Jones, former state representative (D-Jacksonville)
- Shevrin Jones, state representative (D-West Park)
- Bobby Powell, state senator (D-West Palm Beach)
- Bakari Sellers, former state representative (D-Denmark, South Carolina)
- Carlos Guillermo Smith, state representative (D-Orlando)
- Perry Thurston, state senator (D-Fort Lauderdale)

Mayors and other municipal leaders

- Bob Buckhorn, mayor of Tampa, Florida
- Melvin Carter, mayor of St. Paul, Minnesota
- Joyce Cusack, Volusia County Councilwoman
- Bill de Blasio, mayor of New York City
- Buddy Dyer, mayor of Orlando, Florida
- Anne Gannon, Palm Beach County Tax Collector
- Letitia James, public advocate of New York City
- Rick Kriseman, mayor of St. Petersburg, Florida
- Philip Levine, former mayor of Miami Beach and former candidate
- Wayne Messam, mayor of Miramar
- Gwen Miller, former chairwoman of the Tampa, Florida City Council
- Svante Myrick, mayor of Ithaca, New York
- Rosalind Osgood, Broward County School Board member
- Lauren Poe, mayor of Gainesville
- Hazelle P. Rogers, mayor of Lauderdale Lakes
- Levar Stoney, mayor of Richmond, Virginia

Individuals

- Alec Baldwin, actor
- Ady Barkan, political activist and director of Fed Up
- Adam Best, entrepreneur, film producer, writer and political activist
- Megan Boone, actress
- Karamo Brown, television host, reality television personality, psychotherapist, and activist
- Charlamagne Tha God, nationally-syndicated radio host
- Don Cheadle, actor
- Sean Combs, rapper, singer, songwriter, actor, record producer and entrepreneur, convicted felon
- Billy Corben, documentary film director
- Rosario Dawson, actress and activist
- Lee Daniels, film producer and actor
- Michael Eric Dyson, preacher and author
- America Ferrera, actress
- Jane Fonda, actress
- Jeff Greene, real estate entrepreneur and former candidate
- Fred Guttenberg, activist
- Malynda Hale, singer
- Grant Hill, professional basketball player
- Alex Hirsch, animator
- John Iadarola, anchor on The Young Turks
- John P. Kee, gospel singer
- DJ Khaled, disc jockey and record producer
- Shaun King, writer and civil rights activist
- Norman Lear, television writer and producer
- John Leguizamo, actor, stand-up comedian, film producer, playwright, and screenwriter
- Eva Longoria, actress and activist
- Alyssa Milano, actress
- John Morgan, attorney, founder of the law firm Morgan & Morgan
- Ana Navarro, Republican political strategist
- Bob Poe, former chair of the Florida Democratic Party, Democratic candidate for U.S. House in 2016
- Cecile Richards, activist
- Rihanna, singer, actress, and diplomat
- Gina Rodriguez, actress and activist
- Rick Ross, rapper, entrepreneur and record executive
- Mark Ruffalo, actor
- Angela Rye, podcaster and former pundit
- Zoe Saldaña, actress
- Kendrick Sampson, actor
- Amy Schumer, actress
- Jussie Smollett, actor and singer
- George Soros, investor, business magnate, philanthropist, political activist and author
- Tom Steyer, hedge fund manager, philanthropist, environmentalist, Democratic fundraiser
- Tara Strong, voice actress and activist
- Allison Tant, former chair of the Florida Democratic Party
- Gabrielle Union, actress, activist, and author
- Tommy Vietor, political commentator

Organizations

- Democracy for America
- Indivisible movement
- National Nurses United
- NextGen America
- Our Revolution
- People for the American Way
- Progressive Change Campaign Committee
- Sierra Club
- Working Families Party

Newspapers

- Miami Herald
- Orlando Sentinel
- The Palm Beach Post
- Tampa Bay Times

Sheriffs

- Jerry Demings, Orange County sheriff
- Morris A. Young, Gadsden County sheriff
Ron DeSantis (R)

U.S. executive branch officials

- Mike Pence, vice president of the United States
- Sonny Perdue, United States secretary of agriculture
- Donald Trump, president of the United States

U.S. senators

- Marco Rubio, U.S. senator (R-FL)

U.S. representatives

- Neal Dunn, U.S. representative (FL-02)
- Matt Gaetz, U.S. representative (FL-01)
- Jenniffer González, resident commissioner of Puerto Rico
- Brian Mast, U.S. representative (FL-18)

State senators

- Dennis K. Baxley
- Aaron Bean
- Lizbeth Benacquisto
- Rob Bradley
- Doug Broxson
- Anitere Flores
- George Gainer
- Bill Galvano
- René García
- Tom Lee
- Debbie Mayfield
- Kathleen Passidomo
- Kelli Stargel
- Greg Steube

State representatives

- Ben Albritton
- Halsey Beshears
- Michael Bileca
- Jim Boyd
- Danny Burgess
- Colleen Burton
- Cord Byrd
- Bob Cortes
- Travis Cummings
- Manny Díaz Jr.
- Byron Donalds
- Brad Drake
- Dane Eagle
- Randy Fine
- Jason Fischer
- Erin Grall
- Jamie Grant
- Joe Gruters
- Bill Hager
- Gayle Harrell
- Shawn Harrison
- Clay Ingram
- Sam Killebrew
- Mike La Rosa
- Tom Leek
- MaryLynn Magar
- Stan McClain
- José R. Oliva
- Bobby Olszewski
- Bobby Payne
- Ray Pilon
- Mel Ponder
- Elizabeth W. Porter
- Jake Raburn
- Holly Raschein
- Paul Renner
- Bob Rommel
- Rick Roth
- David Santiago
- Chris Sprowls
- Cyndi Stevenson
- Charlie Stone
- Frank White
- Jayer Williamson
- Clay Yarborough

Sheriffs

- Mike Adkinson, Walton County sheriff
- Larry Ashley, Okaloosa County sheriff
- Michael Chitwood, Volusia County sheriff
- Darryl Daniels, Clay County sheriff
- Gator DeLoach, Putnam County sheriff
- Bill Farmer, Sumter County sheriff
- Tommy Ford, Bay County sheriff
- Peyton Grinnell, Lake County sheriff
- Bob Gualtieri, Pinellas County sheriff
- Mark Hunter, Columbia County sheriff
- Wayne Ivey, Brevard County sheriff
- Bob Johnson, Santa Rosa County sheriff
- Grady Judd, Polk County sheriff
- Arnold Lanier, Hardee County sheriff
- Bill Leeper, Nassau County sheriff
- Dennis Lemma, Seminole County sheriff
- Deryl Loar, Indian River County sheriff
- Bobby McCallum, Levy County sheriff
- Mac McNeill, Jefferson County sheriff
- David Morgan, Escambia County sheriff
- Al Nienhuis, Hernando County sheriff
- Chris Nocco, Pasco County sheriff
- Mike Prendergast, Citrus County Sheriff
- Bill Prummell, Charlotte County sheriff
- Kevin Rambosk, Collier County sheriff
- Rick Ramsay, Monroe County sheriff
- Scotty Rhoden, Baker County sheriff
- Lou Roberts, Jackson County sheriff
- Sam St. Johns, Suwannee County sheriff
- Bobby Schultz, Gilchrist County sheriff
- David Shoar, St. Johns County sheriff
- AJ Smith, Franklin County sheriff
- Gordon Smith, Bradford County sheriff
- William Snyder, Martin County sheriff
- Rick Staly, Flagler County sheriff
- Benjamine Stewart, Madison County sheriff
- Rick Wells, Manatee County sheriff
- Steve Whidden, Hendry County sheriff
- Brad Whitehead, Union County sheriff
- Mike Williams, Duval County sheriff
- Mike Williams, Jacksonville sheriff
- Billy Woods, Marion County sheriff

Mayors and other municipal leaders

- Lenny Curry, mayor of Jacksonville
- Carlos A. Giménez, mayor of Miami-Dade County
- Rudy Giuliani, former mayor of New York City
- Carlos Hernández, mayor of Hialeah
- Carlos Molina, mayor of Arecibo
- Angel Pérez Otero, mayor of Guaynabo
- Ramón Luis Rivera Jr., mayor of Bayamón

State and territorial officials

- José Banchs Alemán, representative
- José Aponte Hernández, representative
- Joel Franqui Atiles, representative
- Ángel Bulerín, representative
- Jeb Bush, former governor of Florida
- Eddie Charbonier Chinea, representative
- Nelson del Valle, representative
- José "Memo" González Mercado, representative
- Urayoán Hernández, representative
- Maricarmen Mas Rodríguez, representative
- José "Quiquito" Melendéz Ortiz, representative
- Carlos Johnny Méndez, speaker of the House of Representatives of Puerto Rico
- María Milagros Charbonier, representative
- Juan Oscar Morales, representative
- Jorge Navarro Suárez, representative
- Víctor Parés, representative
- Luis Pérez Ortiz, representative
- Michael Abid Quiñones Irizarry, representative
- María de Lourdes Ramos Rivera, representative
- Guillermo Miranda Rivera, representative
- June Rivera, representative
- Luis Rivera Marín, secretary of state of Puerto Rico
- Gabriel Rodríguez Aguiló, representative
- Jackeline "Jackie" Rodríguez Hernández, representative
- Yashira Lebrón Rodríguez, representative
- Wilson Roman, representative-elect
- Pellé Santiago, representative
- Rick Scott, governor of Florida
- Tony Soto, representative
- Félix Lasalle Toro, representative
- Víc Torres, representative
- José "Pichy" Torres Zamora, representative
- Reinaldo "Rey" Vargas, representative
- Néstor Alonso Vega, representative

Individuals

- Sheldon Adelson, business magnate, investor, and philanthropist
- Hushang Ansary, businessman, former diplomat, and philanthropist
- Dan Bongino, NRATV contributor
- David Bossie, political activist
- Foster Friess, businessman and supporter of conservative Christian causes
- Sean Hannity, talk show host, author, and conservative political commentator
- Kyle Kashuv, school safety activist
- Mark Levin, lawyer, author, and radio personality
- Bernard Marcus, businessman
- Rebekah Mercer, heiress, foundation director, and major Republican donor
- Isaac Perlmutter, businessman, financier, CEO of Marvel Entertainment
- Andrew Pollack, activist
- David A. Siegel, businessman
- Donald Trump Jr., businessman and son of U.S. President Donald Trump
- Lara Trump, television host, producer, and daughter-in-law of U.S. President Donald Trump
- Richard Uihlein, businessman and major Republican Party donor

Organizations

- American Conservative Union
- Broward Sheriff's Office Deputies Association
- The Everglades Trust
- First Coast Manufacturers Association
- Florida Chamber of Commerce
- Florida Medical Association
- Florida Police Benevolent Association
- Florida Police Chiefs Association
- Florida Realtors Association
- Florida Right to Life
- Freedom Partners Action Fund
- Great America Committee
- International Union of Police Associations
- JAXBIZ
- National Federation of Independent Business
- NRA Political Victory Fund

Newspapers

- The Jewish Press
Darcy Richardson (Ref.)

U.S. senators

- Mike Gravel, former Democratic senator from Alaska (1969–1981) and Libertarian candidate for president in 2008

State officials

- Nancy Argenziano, former Florida state senator and Public Service commissioner
- Randy Wiseman, former Republican chair of the Lake County School Board

=== Predictions ===
Source	Ranking	As of
The Cook Political Report	Tossup	October 26, 2018
The Washington Post	Tossup	November 5, 2018
FiveThirtyEight	Likely D (flip)	November 5, 2018
Rothenberg Political Report	Tilt D (flip)	November 1, 2018
Sabato's Crystal Ball	Lean D (flip)	November 5, 2018
RealClearPolitics	Tossup	November 4, 2018
Daily Kos	Tossup	November 5, 2018
Fox News (Note: The Fox News Midterm Power Rankings uniquely does not contain a category for Safe/Solid races)	Tossup	November 5, 2018
Politico	Tossup	November 5, 2018
Governing	Tossup	November 5, 2018

=== Polling ===

Poll source	Date(s) administered	Sample size	Margin of error	Ron DeSantis (R)	Andrew Gillum (D)	Other	Undecided
The Trafalgar Group (R)	November 4–5, 2018	1,484	± 2.5%	50%	47%	1%	2%
HarrisX	November 3–5, 2018	600	± 4.0%	46%	49%	–	–
St. Pete Polls	November 3–4, 2018	3,088	± 1.8%	45%	50%	2% (Note: Darcy Richardson (Reform))	3%
HarrisX	November 2–4, 2018	600	± 4.0%	46%	48%	–	–
Quinnipiac University	October 29 – November 4, 2018	1,142	± 3.5%	43%	50%	1%	6%
Emerson College	November 1–3, 2018	784	± 3.7%	46%	51%	2%	1%
HarrisX	November 1–3, 2018	600	± 4.0%	46%	49%	–	–
Research Co.	November 1–3, 2018	450	± 4.6%	46%	47%	2%	5%
St. Pete Polls	November 1–2, 2018	2,733	± 1.9%	46%	48%	2%	4%
HarrisX	October 31 – November 2, 2018	600	± 4.0%	45%	50%	–	–
Marist College	October 30 – November 2, 2018	595 LV	± 5.0%	46%	50%	<1%	3%
Marist College	October 30 – November 2, 2018	917 RV	± 4.1%	45%	50%	<1%	5%
Gravis Marketing	October 29 – November 2, 2018	753	± 3.6%	47%	48%	–	5%
HarrisX	October 30 – November 1, 2018	600	± 4.0%	45%	50%	–	–
Targoz Market Research	October 28–31, 2018	558	–	48%	47%	–	5%
HarrisX	October 29–31, 2018	600	± 4.0%	43%	50%	–	–
MWR Research/Consumer Energy Alliance (Note: The Consumer Energy Alliance is a pro-Keystone XL lobbying group.)	October 25–31, 2020	1,005	–	40%	41%	1%	18% (Note: Includes "Refused")
The Trafalgar Group (R)	October 29–30, 2018	2,543	± 1.9%	46%	48%	3%	2%
Vox Populi Polling	October 27–30, 2018	696	± 3.7%	47%	53%	–	–
HarrisX	October 24–30, 2018	1,400	± 2.6%	42%	44%	–	–
Cygnal (R)	October 27–29, 2018	495	± 4.4%	47%	47%	5%	1%
CNN/SSRS	October 24–29, 2018	781 LV	± 4.3%	48%	49%	0%	2%
CNN/SSRS	October 24–29, 2018	887 RV	± 4.0%	45%	48%	0%	4%
Suffolk University	October 25–28, 2018	500	± 4.4%	44%	45%	1% (Note: Kyle Gibson (NPA) with 1%, Ryan Foley (NPA), Darcy Richardson (Reform), and Bruce Stanley (NPA) with 0%)	8%
NYT Upshot/Siena College	October 23–27, 2018	737	± 4.0%	43%	48%	1%	8%
University of North Florida	October 23–26, 2018	1,051	± 3.0%	43%	49%	<1%	7%
YouGov	October 23–26, 2018	991	± 4.0%	46%	47%	2%	5%
Ipsos	October 17–25, 2018	1,069	± 3.4%	44%	50%	3%	3%
Gravis Marketing	October 22–23, 2018	773	± 3.5%	46%	51%	–	3%
Strategic Research Associates	October 16–23, 2018	800	± 3.5%	48%	45%	–	8%
1892 Polling (R-DeSantis)	October 20–22, 2018	2,500	± 2.0%	47%	46%	2%	6%
Saint Leo University	October 16–22, 2018	698	± 3.5%	37%	49%	4%	11%
St. Pete Polls	October 20–21, 2018	1,575	± 2.5%	46%	47%	2%	4%
Florida Atlantic University	October 18–21, 2018	704	± 3.6%	37%	41%	4%	18%
SurveyUSA	October 18–21, 2018	665	± 5.0%	42%	49%	1%	8%
Quinnipiac University	October 17–21, 2018	1,161	± 3.5%	46%	52%	1%	2%
Schroth, Eldon and Associates (D)	October 17–20, 2018	600	± 4.0%	42%	48%	–	10%
CNN/SSRS	October 16–20, 2018	759 LV	± 4.2%	42%	54%	0%	4%
CNN/SSRS	October 16–20, 2018	872 RV	± 3.9%	42%	52%	0%	5%
OnMessage Inc. (R-Scott)	October 14–18, 2018	2,200	± 2.1%	48%	45%	3%	4%
St. Pete Polls	October 15–16, 2018	1,974	± 2.2%	46%	47%	2%	5%
Florida Southern College	October 1–5, 2018	476	± 4.5%	44%	47%	5%	4%
Kaiser Family Foundation/SSRS	September 19 – October 2, 2018	522	± 6.0%	40%	48%	1%	10%
St. Pete Polls	September 29–30, 2018	2,313	± 2.0%	45%	47%	2%	6%
Public Policy Polling (D-Protect Our Care)	September 28–30, 2018	779	± 3.5%	44%	48%	–	8%
Strategic Research Associates	September 17–30, 2018	800	± 3.5%	43%	44%	–	12%
Mason-Dixon	September 24–27, 2018	815	± 3.5%	44%	45%	3%	8%
Quinnipiac University	September 22–24, 2018	888	± 4.0%	45%	54%	0%	2%
Cherry Communications	September 19–24, 2018	622	± 4.4%	42%	48%	2%	6%
Marist College	September 16–20, 2018	600 LV	± 4.7%	43%	48%	1%	7%
Marist College	September 16–20, 2018	829 RV	± 4.0%	41%	49%	1%	10%
University of North Florida	September 17–19, 2018	605	–	43%	47%	<1%	10%
Florida Atlantic University	September 13–16, 2018	850	± 3.3%	39%	41%	5%	15%
Ipsos	September 5–12, 2018	1,000	± 4.0%	44%	50%	2%	5%
Rasmussen Reports	September 10–11, 2018	800	± 3.5%	42%	48%	2%	8%
SurveyUSA	September 7–9, 2018	634	± 5.3%	43%	47%	1%	9%
Cherry Communications	September 6–9, 2018	514	± 4.0%	43%	47%	2%	8%
St. Pete Polls	September 5–6, 2018	2,240	± 2.1%	47%	48%	–	5%
Quinnipiac University	August 30 – September 3, 2018	785	± 4.3%	47%	50%	0%	3%
Gravis Marketing	August 29–30, 2018	1,225	± 2.8%	45%	47%	–	8%
Public Policy Polling (D-EDGE Comms.)	August 29–30, 2018	743	± 4.0%	43%	48%	–	9%
Gravis Marketing	July 13–14, 2018	1,840	± 2.3%	39%	36%	–	25%
Gravis Marketing	May 31 – June 15, 2018	485	± 4.5%	35%	38%	–	27%
Gravis Marketing	February 26 – March 19, 2018	2,212	± 2.1%	29%	33%	–	37%

Hypothetical polling

with Ron DeSantis and Gwen Graham

Poll source	Date(s) administered	Sample size	Margin of error	Ron DeSantis (R)	Gwen Graham (D)	Other	Undecided
Frederick Polls (D)	August 16–20, 2018	500	± 4.4%	40%	44%	–	–
Saint Leo University	August 10–16, 2018	500	± 4.5%	31%	36%	9%	24%
Gravis Marketing	July 13–14, 2018	1,840	± 2.3%	38%	42%	–	20%
Gravis Marketing	May 31 – June 15, 2018	485	± 4.5%	34%	44%	–	22%
Saint Leo University	May 25–31, 2018	506	± 4.5%	16%	22%	13%	49%
Public Policy Polling (D-EDGE Comms.)	April 10–11, 2018	661	–	36%	40%	–	24%
Gravis Marketing	February 26 – March 19, 2018	2,212	± 2.1%	30%	33%	–	37%

with Ron DeSantis and Jeff Greene

Poll source	Date(s) administered	Sample size	Margin of error	Ron DeSantis (R)	Jeff Greene (D)	Undecided
Gravis Marketing	July 13–14, 2018	1,840	± 2.3%	39%	39%	22%

with Ron DeSantis and Chris King

Poll source	Date(s) administered	Sample size	Margin of error	Ron DeSantis (R)	Chris King (D)	Undecided
Gravis Marketing	May 31 – June 15, 2018	485	± 4.5%	35%	37%	29%

with Ron DeSantis and Philip Levine

Poll source	Date(s) administered	Sample size	Margin of error	Ron DeSantis (R)	Philip Levine (D)	Other	Undecided
Saint Leo University	August 10–16, 2018	500	± 4.5%	30%	34%	11%	25%
Gravis Marketing	July 13–14, 2018	1,840	± 2.3%	40%	38%	–	22%
Public Policy Polling (D-EDGE Comms.)	June 18–19, 2018	1,308	–	36%	41%	–	–
Gravis Marketing	May 31 – June 15, 2018	485	± 4.5%	33%	43%	–	24%
Saint Leo University	May 25–31, 2018	506	± 4.5%	17%	22%	12%	49%
Public Policy Polling (D-EDGE Comms.)	April 10–11, 2018	661	–	37%	42%	–	22%

with Adam Putnam and Andrew Gillum

Poll source	Date(s) administered	Sample size	Margin of error	Adam Putnam (R)	Andrew Gillum (D)	Undecided
Gravis Marketing	July 13–14, 2018	1,840	± 2.3%	41%	35%	29%
Gravis Marketing	May 31 – June 15, 2018	485	± 4.5%	39%	42%	20%
Gravis Marketing	February 26 – March 19, 2018	2,212	± 2.1%	34%	28%	38%
Gravis Marketing	February 1–18, 2018	1,978	± 2.2%	30%	30%	40%
Gravis Marketing	December 19–24, 2017	5,778	± 1.3%	31%	31%	39%
Cherry Communications	September 17–24, 2017	615	–	40%	33%	–
Gravis Marketing	March 28–29, 2017	1,453	± 2.6%	32%	31%	37%

with Adam Putnam and Gwen Graham

Poll source	Date(s) administered	Sample size	Margin of error	Adam Putnam (R)	Gwen Graham (D)	Other	Undecided
Saint Leo University	August 10–16, 2018	500	± 4.5%	36%	31%	9%	24%
Gravis Marketing	July 13–14, 2018	1,840	± 2.3%	40%	39%	–	20%
Gravis Marketing	May 31 – June 15, 2018	485	± 4.5%	39%	45%	–	17%
Saint Leo University	May 25–31, 2018	506	± 4.5%	25%	20%	13%	43%
Public Policy Polling (D-EDGE Comms.)	April 10–11, 2018	661	–	36%	37%	–	27%
Gravis Marketing	February 26 – March 19, 2018	2,212	± 2.1%	34%	32%	–	34%
Saint Leo University	February 18–24, 2018	500	± 4.5%	22%	18%	14%	45%
Gravis Marketing	February 1–18, 2018	1,978	± 2.2%	33%	29%	–	38%
Gravis Marketing	December 19–24, 2017	5,778	± 1.3%	32%	32%	–	37%
Cherry Communications	September 17–24, 2017	615	–	39%	37%	–	–
Gravis Marketing	March 28–29, 2017	1,453	± 2.6%	32%	34%	–	35%
Cherry Communications	December 3–8, 2016	606	–	39%	36%	–	25%
Gravis Marketing	November 22–25, 2016	3,250	± 2.4%	34%	37%	–	30%

with Adam Putnam and Jeff Greene

Poll source	Date(s) administered	Sample size	Margin of error	Adam Putnam (R)	Jeff Greene (D)	Undecided
Gravis Marketing	July 13–14, 2018	1,840	± 2.3%	41%	39%	20%

with Adam Putnam and Chris King

Poll source	Date(s) administered	Sample size	Margin of error	Adam Putnam (R)	Chris King (D)	Undecided
Gravis Marketing	May 31 – June 15, 2018	485	± 4.5%	39%	38%	23%
Cherry Communications	September 17–24, 2017	615	–	40%	31%	–

with Adam Putnam and Philip Levine

Poll source	Date(s) administered	Sample size	Margin of error	Adam Putnam (R)	Philip Levine (D)	Other	Undecided
Saint Leo University	August 10–16, 2018	500	± 4.5%	37%	30%	9%	25%
Gravis Marketing	July 13–14, 2018	1,840	± 2.3%	43%	38%	–	19%
Public Policy Polling (D-EDGE Comms.)	June 18–19, 2018	1,308	–	38%	43%	–	–
Gravis Marketing	May 31 – June 15, 2018	485	± 4.5%	39%	43%	–	19%
Saint Leo University	May 25–31, 2018	506	± 4.5%	24%	20%	11%	44%
Public Policy Polling (D-EDGE Comms.)	April 10–11, 2018	661	–	37%	41%	–	23%
Cherry Communications	September 17–24, 2017	615	–	40%	32%	–	–

with Bob White and Andrew Gillum

Poll source	Date(s) administered	Sample size	Margin of error	Bob White (R)	Andrew Gillum (D)	Undecided
Gravis Marketing	May 31 – June 15, 2018	485	± 4.5%	28%	38%	35%

with Bob White and Gwen Graham

Poll source	Date(s) administered	Sample size	Margin of error	Bob White (R)	Gwen Graham (D)	Undecided
Gravis Marketing	May 31 – June 15, 2018	485	± 4.5%	27%	44%	29%

with Bob White and Chris King

Poll source	Date(s) administered	Sample size	Margin of error	Bob White (R)	Chris King (D)	Undecided
Gravis Marketing	May 31 – June 15, 2018	485	± 4.5%	28%	36%	36%

with Bob White and Philip Levine

Poll source	Date(s) administered	Sample size	Margin of error	Bob White (R)	Philip Levine (D)	Undecided
Gravis Marketing	May 31 – June 15, 2018	485	± 4.5%	29%	42%	29%

with generic Republican and Democrat

Poll source	Date(s) administered	Sample size	Margin of error	Generic Republican	Generic Democrat	Undecided
Morning Consult	May 29–30, 2018	1,199	± 3.0%	38%	40%	22%
Quinnipiac University	February 23–26, 2018	1,156	± 3.6%	37%	45%	18%

with Richard Corcoran and Andrew Gillum

Poll source	Date(s) administered	Sample size	Margin of error	Richard Corcoran (R)	Andrew Gillum (D)	Undecided
Gravis Marketing	May 31 – June 15, 2018	485	± 4.5%	27%	41%	32%
Gravis Marketing	March 28–29, 2017	1,453	± 2.6%	26%	33%	42%
Gravis Marketing	February 26 – March 19, 2018	2,212	± 2.1%	26%	33%	41%
Gravis Marketing	February 1–18, 2018	1,978	± 2.2%	23%	32%	46%
Gravis Marketing	December 19–24, 2017	5,778	± 1.3%	22%	33%	45%

with Richard Corcoran and Gwen Graham

Poll source	Date(s) administered	Sample size	Margin of error	Richard Corcoran (R)	Gwen Graham (D)	Undecided
Gravis Marketing	May 31 – June 15, 2018	485	± 4.5%	27%	44%	29%
Gravis Marketing	March 28–29, 2017	1,453	± 2.6%	29%	34%	38%
Gravis Marketing	February 26 – March 19, 2018	2,212	± 2.1%	28%	32%	40%
Gravis Marketing	February 1–18, 2018	1,978	± 2.2%	24%	33%	44%
Gravis Marketing	December 19–24, 2017	5,778	± 1.3%	24%	33%	43%

with Richard Corcoran and Chris King

Poll source	Date(s) administered	Sample size	Margin of error	Richard Corcoran (R)	Chris King (D)	Undecided
Gravis Marketing	May 31 – June 15, 2018	485	± 4.5%	29%	39%	32%

with Richard Corcoran and Philip Levine

Poll source	Date(s) administered	Sample size	Margin of error	Richard Corcoran (R)	Philip Levine (D)	Undecided
Gravis Marketing	May 31 – June 15, 2018	485	± 4.5%	29%	43%	28%

with Richard Corcoran and John Morgan

Poll source	Date(s) administered	Sample size	Margin of error	Richard Corcoran (R)	John Morgan (D)	Undecided
Gravis Marketing	March 28–29, 2017	1,453	± 2.6%	27%	39%	34%

with David Jolly and John Morgan

Poll source	Date(s) administered	Sample size	Margin of error	David Jolly (R)	John Morgan (D)	Undecided
Gravis Marketing	November 22–25, 2016	3,250	± 2.4%	31%	42%	27%

with Jeff Atwater and Gwen Graham

Poll source	Date(s) administered	Sample size	Margin of error	Jeff Atwater (R)	Gwen Graham (D)	Undecided
Gravis Marketing	November 22–25, 2016	3,250	± 2.4%	32%	40%	28%

with Jeff Atwater and John Morgan

Poll source	Date(s) administered	Sample size	Margin of error	Jeff Atwater (R)	John Morgan (D)	Undecided
Gravis Marketing	November 22–25, 2016	3,250	± 2.4%	34%	41%	25%

with Pam Bondi and Gwen Graham

Poll source	Date(s) administered	Sample size	Margin of error	Pam Bondi (R)	Gwen Graham (D)	Undecided
Gravis Marketing	November 22–25, 2016	3,250	± 2.4%	36%	44%	20%

with Pam Bondi and John Morgan

Poll source	Date(s) administered	Sample size	Margin of error	Pam Bondi (R)	John Morgan (D)	Undecided
Gravis Marketing	November 22–25, 2016	3,250	± 2.4%	35%	45%	20%

with David Jolly and Gwen Graham

Poll source	Date(s) administered	Sample size	Margin of error	David Jolly (R)	Gwen Graham (D)	Undecided
Gravis Marketing	November 22–25, 2016	3,250	± 2.4%	29%	40%	31%

with Andrew Putnam, Andrew Gillum, and John Morgan

Poll source	Date(s) administered	Sample size	Margin of error	Adam Putnam (R)	Andrew Gillum (D)	John Morgan (I)	Undecided
Gravis Marketing	February 26 – March 19, 2018	2,212	± 2.1%	28%	23%	16%	34%
Gravis Marketing	February 1–18, 2018	1,978	± 2.2%	27%	20%	17%	36%
Gravis Marketing	December 19–24, 2017	5,778	± 1.3%	26%	22%	18%	34%

with Andrew Putnam, Gwen Graham, and John Morgan

Poll source	Date(s) administered	Sample size	Margin of error	Adam Putnam (R)	Gwen Graham (D)	John Morgan (I)	Undecided
Gravis Marketing	February 26 – March 19, 2018	2,212	± 2.1%	29%	22%	17%	32%
Gravis Marketing	February 1–18, 2018	1,978	± 2.2%	28%	21%	17%	34%
Gravis Marketing	December 19–24, 2017	5,778	± 1.3%	27%	23%	17%	33%

with Richard Corcoran, Andrew Gillum, and John Morgan

Poll source	Date(s) administered	Sample size	Margin of error	Richard Corcoran (R)	Andrew Gillum (D)	John Morgan (I)	Undecided
Gravis Marketing	February 26 – March 19, 2018	2,212	± 2.1%	25%	23%	17%	34%
Gravis Marketing	February 1–18, 2018	1,978	± 2.2%	20%	21%	17%	41%
Gravis Marketing	December 19–24, 2017	5,778	± 1.3%	20%	23%	19%	39%

with Richard Corcoran, Gwen Graham, and John Morgan

Poll source	Date(s) administered	Sample size	Margin of error	Richard Corcoran (R)	Gwen Graham (D)	John Morgan (I)	Undecided
Gravis Marketing	February 26 – March 19, 2018	2,212	± 2.1%	26%	21%	16%	37%
Gravis Marketing	February 1–18, 2018	1,978	± 2.2%	20%	23%	16%	41%
Gravis Marketing	December 19–24, 2017	5,778	± 1.3%	20%	24%	18%	38%

with Adam Putnam and John Morgan

Poll source	Date(s) administered	Sample size	Margin of error	Adam Putnam (R)	John Morgan (D)	Other	Undecided
Saint Leo University	November 19–24, 2017	500	± 4.5%	19%	24%	8%	49%
Cherry Communications	September 17–24, 2017	615	–	40%	37%	–	–
Saint Leo University	September 10–16, 2017	500	± 4.5%	18%	24%	16%	42%
Gravis Marketing	March 28–29, 2017	1,453	± 2.6%	33%	34%	–	32%
Saint Leo University	March 3–11, 2017	507	± 4.5%	20%	26%	13%	42%
Cherry Communications	December 3–8, 2016	606	–	40%	37%	–	23%
Gravis Marketing	November 22–25, 2016	3,250	± 2.4%	35%	39%	–	26%

=== Results ===
State senate district results

2018 Florida gubernatorial election
Party	Candidate	Votes	%	±%
Republican	Ron DeSantis	4,076,186	49.59%	+1.45%
Democratic	Andrew Gillum	4,043,723	49.19%	+2.12%
Reform	Darcy Richardson	47,140	0.57%	N/A
Independent	Kyle "KC" Gibson	24,310	0.30%	N/A
Independent	Ryan Christopher Foley	14,630	0.18%	N/A
Independent	Bruce Stanley	14,505	0.18%	N/A
Write-in		67	0.00%	N/A
Total votes		8,220,561	100.00%	N/A
Republican hold				

==== By county ====
County	Ron DeSantis Republican		Andrew Gillum Democratic		Various candidates Other parties		Margin		Total votes cast
County	#	%	#	%	#	%	#	%	Total votes cast
Alachua	41,278	35.8%	72,711	63.1%	1,205	1.1%	-31,433	-27.3%	115,194
Baker	8,687	82.4%	1,760	16.7%	95	0.9%	6,927	65.7%	10,542
Bay	45,709	72.2%	16,757	26.5%	865	1.4%	28,952	45.7%	63,331
Bradford	7,698	73.3%	2,671	25.4%	136	1.3%	5,027	47.9%	10,505
Brevard	162,213	57.6%	114,921	40.8%	4,454	1.6%	47,292	16.8%	281,588
Broward	222,012	31.3%	482,152	68.0%	5,015	0.7%	-260,140	-36.7%	709,179
Calhoun	3,576	77.6%	923	20.0%	110	2.3%	2,653	57.6%	4,609
Charlotte	54,102	62.3%	31,248	36.0%	1,546	1.8%	22,854	26.3%	86,896
Citrus	47,729	67.3%	21,197	29.9%	1,972	2.9%	26,532	37.4%	70,898
Clay	64,401	68.9%	28,150	30.1%	931	1.1%	36,251	38.8%	93,482
Collier	100,303	64.5%	53,594	34.5%	1,556	1.0%	46,709	30.0%	155,453
Columbia	17,426	70.1%	7,105	28.6%	312	1.3%	10,321	41.5%	24,843
DeSoto	5,663	63.6%	3,059	34.4%	180	2.0%	2,064	29.2%	8,902
Dixie	4,663	80.4%	1,008	17.4%	130	2.2%	3,655	63.0%	5,801
Duval	179,902	47.3%	196,612	51.7%	3,434	0.9%	-16,710	-4.4%	379,948
Escambia	74,719	57.8%	52,835	40.8%	1,813	1.4%	21,884	17.0%	129,367
Flagler	30,951	58.6%	21,183	40.1%	682	1.3%	9,768	18.5%	52,816
Franklin	3,508	64.7%	1,790	33.0%	122	2.3%	1,718	31.7%	5,420
Gadsden	6,200	30.9%	13,712	68.4%	146	0.7%	-7,512	-37.5%	20,058
Gilchrist	5,975	81.1%	1,282	17.4%	109	1.4%	4,693	63.7%	7,366
Glades	2,647	69.1%	1,095	28.6%	88	2.4%	1,552	40.5%	3,830
Gulf	4,265	72.3%	1,511	25.6%	120	2.1%	2,754	46.7%	5,896
Hamilton	2,908	63.9%	1,591	35.0%	53	1.2%	1,317	28.9%	4,552
Hardee	4,486	70.1%	1,802	28.2%	110	1.7%	2,684	41.9%	6,398
Hendry	5,177	58.3%	3,516	39.6%	180	2.1%	1,661	18.7%	8,873
Hernando	49,671	61.6%	29,426	36.5%	1,517	1.9%	20,245	25.1%	80,614
Highlands	26,285	66.1%	12,783	32.2%	689	1.7%	13,502	33.9%	39,757
Hillsborough	234,835	44.9%	281,598	53.9%	6,430	1.3%	-46,763	-9.0%	522,863
Holmes	5,940	87.7%	737	10.9%	96	1.5%	5,203	76.8%	6,773
Indian River	44,925	60.5%	28,460	38.3%	867	1.1%	16,465	22.2%	74,252
Jackson	10,771	67.4%	5,019	31.4%	187	1.2%	5,752	36.0%	15,977
Jefferson	3,877	52.7%	3,375	45.9%	107	1.5%	502	6.8%	7,359
Lafayette	2,364	83.7%	419	14.8%	42	1.5%	1,945	68.9%	2,825
Lake	92,633	59.7%	60,289	38.9%	2,216	1.5%	32,344	20.8%	155,138
Lee	174,085	60.1%	111,172	38.4%	4,320	1.5%	62,913	21.7%	289,577
Leon	49,492	35.7%	88,764	63.4%	1,328	0.9%	-38,822	-27.7%	140,034
Levy	12,084	70.7%	4,718	27.6%	287	1.8%	7,366	43.1%	17,089
Liberty	2,060	76.8%	527	19.6%	95	3.5%	1,533	57.2%	2,682
Madison	4,345	57.0%	3,235	42.4%	45	0.6%	1,110	14.6%	7,625
Manatee	93,246	57.1%	67,629	41.4%	2,474	1.5%	25,617	15.7%	163,349
Marion	94,901	61.3%	57,392	37.1%	2,568	1.6%	37,509	24.2%	154,861
Martin	47,820	61.5%	29,133	37.5%	770	1.1%	18,687	24.0%	77,723
Miami-Dade	311,581	39.0%	478,958	59.9%	8,485	1.1%	-167,377	-20.9%	799,024
Monroe	18,509	51.2%	17,176	47.5%	448	1.2%	1,333	3.7%	36,133
Nassau	31,704	72.8%	11,472	26.3%	390	0.8%	20,232	46.5%	43,566
Okaloosa	59,940	71.5%	22,408	26.7%	1,534	1.8%	37,532	44.8%	83,882
Okeechobee	7,730	68.8%	3,306	29.4%	203	1.9%	4,424	37.4%	11,239
Orange	174,228	36.6%	296,257	62.3%	5,234	1.1%	-122,029	-25.7%	475,719
Osceola	44,627	38.8%	68,707	59.7%	1,687	1.5%	-24,080	-20.9%	115,021
Palm Beach	241,016	41.1%	341,409	58.2%	4,299	0.7%	-100,393	-17.1%	586,724
Pasco	120,753	57.2%	86,384	41.0%	3,804	1.8%	34,369	16.2%	210,941
Pinellas	207,677	47.7%	220,818	50.7%	6,799	1.6%	-13,141	-3.0%	435,294
Polk	136,711	55.9%	104,057	42.6%	3,645	1.5%	32,654	13.3%	244,413
Putnam	18,721	66.6%	9,011	32.0%	392	1.5%	9,710	34.6%	28,124
Santa Rosa	56,148	74.3%	18,207	24.1%	1,212	1.5%	37,941	50.2%	75,567
Sarasota	113,211	53.7%	94,986	45.0%	2,751	1.3%	18,225	8.7%	210,948
Seminole	96,622	48.5%	100,197	50.3%	2,397	1.2%	-3,575	-1.8%	199,216
St. Johns	83,658	63.9%	46,206	35.3%	1,133	0.9%	37,452	28.6%	130,997
St. Lucie	58,990	47.6%	63,605	51.3%	1,443	1.2%	-4,615	-3.7%	124,038
Sumter	51,798	69.6%	21,843	29.4%	755	0.9%	29,955	40.2%	74,396
Suwannee	12,234	76.9%	3,450	21.7%	222	1.4%	8,784	55.2%	15,906
Taylor	5,942	74.8%	1,877	23.6%	122	1.5%	4,065	49.2%	7,941
Union	3,841	78.9%	972	20.0%	55	1.1%	2,869	58.9%	4,868
Volusia	124,819	54.6%	100,478	43.9%	3,463	1.5%	24,341	10.7%	228,760
Wakulla	9,802	68.9%	4,194	29.5%	224	1.6%	5,608	39.4%	14,220
Walton	22,925	75.6%	7,019	23.1%	387	1.2%	15,906	52.5%	30,331
Washington	7,017	77.6%	1,865	20.6%	166	1.8%	5,152	57.0%	9,048
Totals	4,076,186	49.6%	4,043,723	49.2%	100,652	1.2%	32,463	0.4%	8,220,561

Counties that flipped from Republican to Democratic

- Duval (largest municipality: Jacksonville)
- Seminole (largest municipality: Sanford)

Counties that flipped from Democratic to Republican

- Jefferson (largest city: Monticello)
- Monroe (largest city: Key West)

==== By congressional district ====
DeSantis won 14 of 27 congressional districts.

District	DeSantis	Gillum	Representative
1st	67%	31%	Matt Gaetz
2nd	66%	33%	Neal Dunn
3rd	55%	44%	Ted Yoho
4th	61%	38%	John Rutherford
5th	34%	65%	Al Lawson
6th	57%	42%	Ron DeSantis
6th	57%	42%	Mike Waltz
7th	44%	55%	Stephanie Murphy
8th	58%	40%	Bill Posey
9th	44%	55%	Darren Soto
10th	36%	63%	Val Demings
11th	64%	34%	Daniel Webster
12th	56%	42%	Gus Bilirakis
13th	45%	53%	Charlie Crist
14th	40%	59%	Kathy Castor
15th	53%	46%	Dennis Ross
15th	53%	46%	Ross Spano
16th	53%	45%	Vern Buchanan
17th	62%	36%	Tom Rooney
17th	62%	36%	Greg Steube
18th	52%	47%	Brian Mast
19th	61%	37%	Francis Rooney
20th	17%	82%	Alcee Hastings
21st	39%	61%	Lois Frankel
22nd	41%	59%	Ted Deutch
23rd	37%	62%	Debbie Wasserman Schultz
24th	16%	84%	Frederica Wilson
25th	57%	41%	Mario Díaz-Balart
26th	46%	53%	Carlos Curbelo
26th	46%	53%	Debbie Mucarsel-Powell
27th	44%	55%	Ileana Ros-Lehtinen
27th	44%	55%	Donna Shalala

== Analysis ==
The close margin mandated a machine recount, which had a deadline of November 15, 2018. If the margin was below 0.25% after machine recount, Ken Detzner, the secretary of state of Florida, would commission a manual recount of over-votes and under-votes. However, after the recount was complete, DeSantis' margin was 0.40%; therefore, he was certified the winner. Gillum conceded on November 17.

DeSantis narrowly won due to strong Republican turnout in several counties in Central/Southwest Florida that had helped Trump pull off a win in 2016, exceeding Rick Scott's 2014 margin of victory in Pasco, Polk, Volusia, Lee, Sarasota, and Brevard, among others. DeSantis also put in a great deal of effort to prevent losing Miami-Dade by too big of a margin, firing up older Cuban exiles and making overtures to Venezuelans, Nicaraguans, and other non Cuban-Hispanics by painting Gillum as a socialist while being boosted by Jeanette Núñez's presence on the ticket. Gillum won the county overwhelmingly (and performed strongly in non-Cuban Hispanic areas), but DeSantis succeeded in keeping Gillum's numbers down, losing by 167,377 votes compared to Trump's 290,147 loss two years earlier.

On November 10, 2022, former president Donald Trump claimed on his Truth Social page that he had prematurely ended the recount to prevent DeSantis and Senate candidate Rick Scott from losing, under the unsubstantiated belief that ballots for them were being removed. Florida Commissioner of Agriculture Nikki Fried asked Attorney General Merrick Garland to investigate. Sarah Isgur, the spokeswoman of the Department of Justice from 2017 to 2019, has said that it "never happened," a position which was supported by other former Department of Justice officials. Broward County Commissioner Steven Geller agreed that no interference took place.

=== Voter demographics ===
Edison Research exit poll
Demographic subgroup	Gillum	DeSantis	No answer	% of voters
Gender
Men	41	58	1	45
Women	57	42	1	55
Age
18–24 years old	58	40	2	5
25–29 years old	64	34	2	5
30–39 years old	65	35	N/A	10
40–49 years old	49	50	1	12
50–64 years old	48	52	N/A	31
65 and older	43	56	1	36
Race
White	39	60	1	66
Black	86	14	N/A	13
Latino	54	44	2	15
Asian	N/A	N/A	N/A	2
Other	65	33	2	4
Race by gender
White men	31	69	N/A	31
White women	47	51	2	35
Black men	91	8	1	6
Black women	82	18	N/A	8
Latino men	49	49	2	6
Latina women	58	41	1	9
Others	65	34	1	5
Education
High school or less	44	54	2	20
Some college education	51	48	1	25
Associate degree	47	51	2	15
Bachelor's degree	47	52	1	24
Advanced degree	57	42	1	16
Education and race
White college graduates	46	54	N/A	27
White no college degree	34	64	2	39
Non-white college graduates	61	38	1	12
Non-white no college degree	73	26	1	22
Whites by education and gender
White women with college degrees	57	42	1	13
White women without college degrees	41	58	1	28
White men with college degrees	35	65	N/A	14
White men without college degrees	26	73	1	17
Non-whites	69	30	1	34
Income
Under $30,000	63	36	1	19
$30,000–49,999	49	51	N/A	22
$50,000–99,999	52	47	1	33
$100,000–199,999	50	50	N/A	19
Over $200,000	N/A	N/A	N/A	7
Party ID
Democrats	93	7	N/A	33
Republicans	7	92	1	38
Independents	54	44	2	29
Party by gender
Democratic men	90	10	N/A	12
Democratic women	95	5	N/A	21
Republican men	7	93	N/A	19
Republican women	7	90	3	18
Independent men	50	49	1	14
Independent women	58	39	3	16
Ideology
Liberals	90	9	1	22
Moderates	61	38	1	39
Conservatives	13	85	2	39
Marital status
Married	44	55	1	64
Unmarried	56	42	2	36
Gender by marital status
Married men	34	65	1	32
Married women	52	47	1	31
Unmarried men	46	51	3	14
Unmarried women	61	37	2	23
First-time midterm election voter
Yes	56	40	4	16
No	47	53	N/A	84
Most important issue facing the country
Health care	74	25	1	40
Immigration	18	80	2	30
Economy	30	69	1	16
Gun policy	77	23	N/A	10
Area type
Urban	57	42	1	42
Suburban	45	53	2	50
Rural	36	64	N/A	8
Source: CNN

== See also ==
- List of governors of Florida
- 2018 United States gubernatorial elections
