= Senator Ortiz =

Senator Ortiz may refer to:

== Bolivia ==
- Oscar Ortiz (Bolivian politician) (born 1969), senator for Santa Cruz in 2015–2020

== Chile ==
- Hugo Ortiz de Filippi (born 1937), senator for the 18th constituency in 1990–1994

== Dominican Republic ==
- Milagros Ortiz Bosch (born 1936), senator for the National District in 1994–2000

== Mexico ==
- Fernando Ortiz Arana (born 1944), senator for Querétaro in 1994–2000
- Graciela Ortiz González (born 1954), senator-at-large in 2012–2018
- Maki Esther Ortiz (born 1962), senator for Tamaulipas in 2012–2015

== United States and territories ==
- Analise Ortiz (born 1993), Arizona State Senate
- Deborah Ortiz (born 1957), California State Senate
- Eder E. Ortiz Ortiz (born 1969), Senate of Puerto Rico
- José E. Meléndez Ortiz, Senate of Puerto Rico
