= Víctor Torres =

Víctor Torres may refer to:

- Víctor Torres (rugby union) (born 1967), Spanish rugby union player
- Víctor Guadalupe Torres (born 1995), Mexican footballer
- Víctor Manuel Torres (born 1958), Mexican politician
- Víctor M. Torres (born 1969), Puerto Rican politician
- Víctor Torres Mestre (born 1970), Spanish footballer
- Vic Torres (born 1947), American politician from Florida
