= Gary Rodríguez =

Puerto Rican politician

Member of the Puerto Rico House of Representatives from the 9th District
- In office January 2, 2009 – January 2, 2017
- Preceded by: Nelson del Valle
- Succeeded by: Nelson del Valle

Personal details
- Born: Angel Edgardo Rodríguez Miranda; January 9, 1977 (age 49) Toa Alta, Puerto Rico
- Party: New Progressive Party (PNP)
- Education: Drexel University (BA); Fels Institute of Government (MPA)

Angel Edgardo "Gary" Rodríguez Miranda (born January 9, 1977) is a Puerto Rican politician. He was a member of the Puerto Rico House of Representatives from 2009 thru 2017.

== Early years and studies ==
Angel Edgardo Rodríguez was born on January 9, 1977, in Toa Alta to former mayor of Toa Alta Angel "Buzo" Rodríguez and Marisol Miranda. He began his elementary studies at the Lutheran College in Bayamón, and continued at the American Military Academy in Guaynabo. During his time at school, Rodríguez excelled in baseball, competing in regional, state, and international tournaments. Rodríguez then moved to the United States and completed high school in Pennsylvania.

In 1994, Rodríguez enrolled at Drexel University in Philadelphia, where he obtained a Bachelor's degree in Business Management, with a major in International Business and Accounting. During his time in college, he was a member of the Society of Hispanic Professional Engineers. In 1996, he was part of an internship with Jansen Pharmaceuticals, a division of Johnson & Johnson, working as an auditor and accountant in their factories in Puerto Rico and New Jersey. After six weeks, they awarded him the Johnson & Johnson Lightning Strike Award.

Rodríguez was admitted at Fels Institute of Government of the University of Pennsylvania in 2000, where he received a Master's degree in Government Administration.

== Professional career ==
In 1998, Rodríguez worked at the Puerto Rico Federal Affairs Administration in Philadelphia, first as an educational officer, and then as a Regional Deputy Director and Director. He also served as member of the Young Executive Committee in Philadelphia.

== Political career ==
Rodríguez began his political career in the United States, when he served as part of the board of directors of an inscription program for voters of the Philadelphia metropolitan area. During that time, he also presided the Philadelphia Council of the League of United Latin American Citizens.

After moving back to Puerto Rico, Rodríguez decided to run for the Puerto Rico House of Representatives with the New Progressive Party (PNP), representing District 9 (Toa Alta and Bayamón). He was elected at the 2008 general election. He then became President of the Commission of Youth Affairs, as well as member of the Commissions of Family, Infrastructure, Transportation, Sports and Recreation, Natural Resources, and North Region.

Rodríguez was re-elected at the 2012 general election.
