= Carlos Bianchi Angleró =

Puerto Rican politician

Member of the Puerto Rico House of Representatives from the 20th District
- In office January 2, 2013 – January 2, 2020
- Preceded by: Norman Ramírez Rivera

Personal details
- Born: February 10, 1974 (age 52) Cabo Rojo, Puerto Rico
- Party: Popular Democratic Party (PPD)
- Education: Interamerican University of Puerto Rico (B.A.)

Carlos A. Bianchi Angleró (born February 10, 1974) is a Puerto Rican politician affiliated with the Popular Democratic Party (PPD). He was elected to the Puerto Rico House of Representatives in 2012 to represent District 20. Bianchi Angleró was appointed by his party to serve as Majority Whip of the Puerto Rico House of Representatives.

House of Representatives of Puerto Rico
Preceded by Norman Ramírez Rivera	Member of the Puerto Rico House of Representatives from the 20th District; 2013–2020	Succeeded by Kebin Maldonado Martínez
Preceded by Ángel Pérez Otero	Majority Whip of the Puerto Rico House of Representatives; 2012–2017	Succeeded by Urayoán Hernández
