= Jacqueline Rodríguez Hernández =

Puerto Rican politician

Member of the Puerto Rico House of Representatives from the 25rd District
- In office January 2, 2017 – January 2, 2021
- Succeeded by: Domingo Torres García

Personal details
- Born: April 10, 1971 (age 55) Ponce, Puerto Rico
- Party: New Progressive Party (PNP)
- Education: Pontifical Catholic University of Puerto Rico (BBA)

Jacqueline Rodríguez Hernández (born April 10, 1971) is a Puerto Rican politician affiliated with the New Progressive Party (PNP). She was a member of the Puerto Rico House of Representatives from 2017 until 2021, representing District 25.

== Early years and studies ==
Born in Ponce, Puerto Rico, she grew up with her parents, Jorge "Piñita" Rodríguez and Josefa Hernández, and six brothers. She obtained her high school diploma from the Adolfo Grana Rivera High School in Peñuelas, Puerto Rico. She holds a bachelor's degree in commercial administration with a concentration in office administration from the Pontifical Catholic University of Puerto Rico in Ponce, Puerto Rico.

== Career ==
Rodríguez Hernández was the regional director of housing and federal affairs. Later, she was assistant to the resident commissioner, Hon. Pedro Pierluisi and deputy director of the Office of Citizen Services of the municipality of Ponce.

=== Puerto Rico House of Representatives ===
She was elected to the Puerto Rico House of Representatives for the 25rd District on the 2016 general elections. She was named president of the Southern Region Integrated Development Commission and Vice-President of the Committee on Housing and Urban Development.
