= Eddie Charbonier Chinea =

Puerto Rican politician (born 1982)

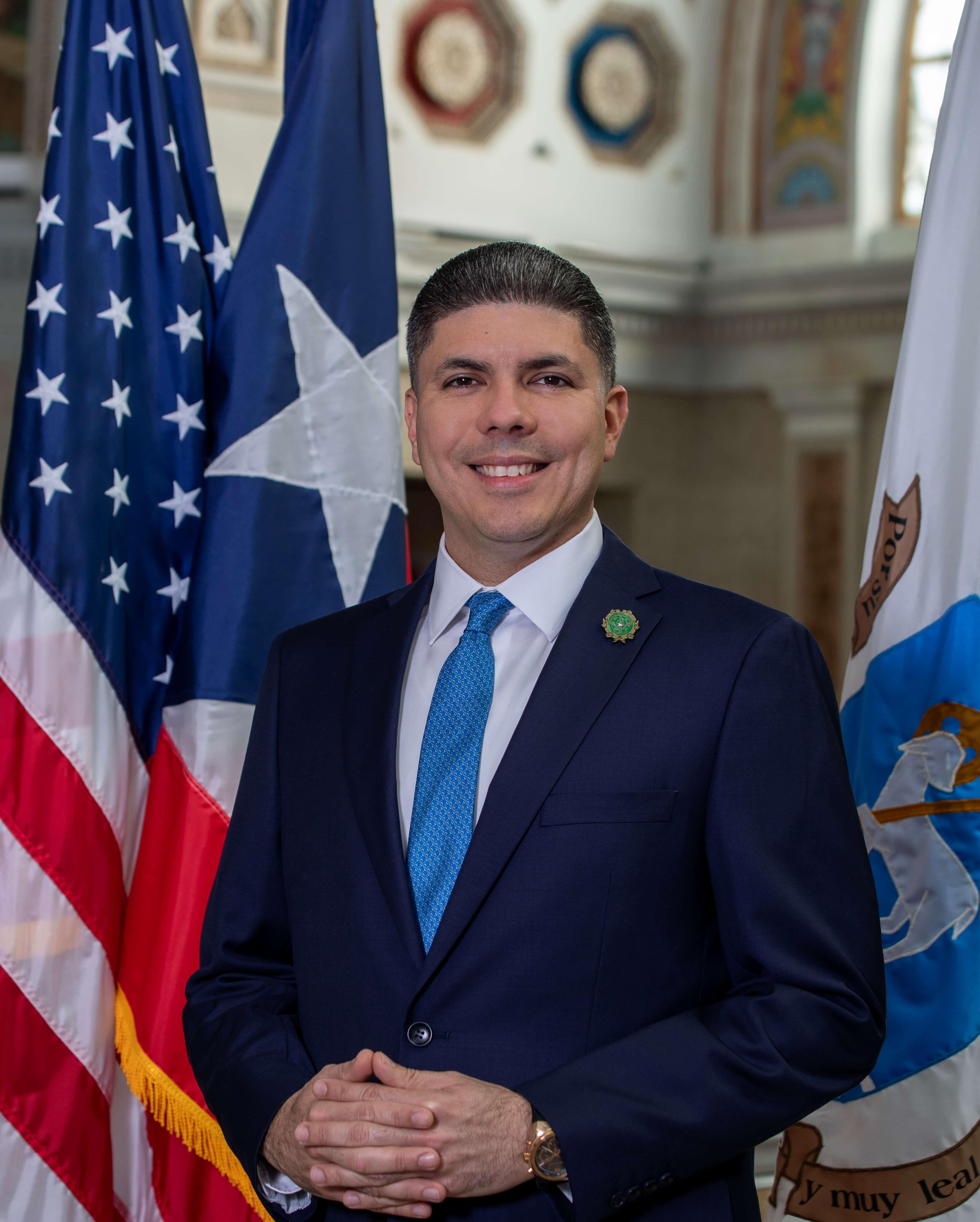

Member of the Puerto Rico House of Representatives from the 1st district
- Incumbent
- Assumed office January 2, 2017
- Preceded by: Nuno López

Personal details
- Born: March 15, 1982 (age 44) San Juan, Puerto Rico
- Party: New Progressive Party (PNP)
- Other political affiliations: Republican

Eddie Charbonier Chinea (born March 15, 1982) is a Puerto Rican politician. He serves as a member for the 1st district of the Puerto Rico House of Representatives.
