= Norman Ramírez Rivera =

Puerto Rican politician (born 1958)

Member of the Puerto Rico House of Representatives from the 20th District
- In office January 2, 2005 – January 1, 2013
- Preceded by: Luis Pérez
- Succeeded by: Carlos Bianchi Angleró

Personal details
- Born: July 28, 1958 (age 68) Mayagüez, Puerto Rico
- Party: New Progressive Party (PNP)
- Children: 2
- Education: Interamerican University of Puerto Rico at San Germán

Norman Ramírez Rivera (born July 28, 1958) is a Puerto Rican politician affiliated with the New Progressive Party (PNP). He was a member of the Puerto Rico House of Representatives from 2005 to 2013 representing District 20.

== Early years and studies ==
Norman F. Ramírez Rivera was born in Mayagüez on July 28, 1958. He studied in the public school system of Cabo Rojo. Ramírez was also a leader during his school years, serving as a school patrolmen, and others.

Ramírez studied Drama at the Technical School of Scenic Craftmanship in San Juan, where he appeared in plays through the island. After that, he became a comedian and formed a clown company. He later represented District 20 in the Puerto Rico House of Representatives.

== Professional career ==
As a professional, Ramírez worked in sales for 23 years, with Parke-Davis, Warner–Lambert, and Pfizer. He worked as salesman, supervisor, and district manager. During his time as salesman, he also studied Business Management and Marketing at the Interamerican University of Puerto Rico. Ramírez also worked as Manager of the Cabo Rojo Market Square.

== Political career ==
Ramírez began his political career in 2003, when he decided to run for the House of Representatives of Puerto Rico. After winning at the primaries that year, he was elected in the general election in 2004. He also became the first PNP candidate to win District 20. During his first term, Ramírez served as president of the Tourism Commission.

Despite being reelected in 2008, Ramírez was defeated in 2012 by Carlos Bianchi Angleró (from the Popular Democratic Party).

== Personal life ==
Ramírez is married, and has two children.
