= Nelson del Valle =

Puerto Rican politician

Member of the Puerto Rico House of Representatives from the 9th District
- In office January 2, 2017 – August 26, 2020
- Preceded by: Angel Rodríguez Miranda
- In office January 2, 2005 – January 1, 2009
- Preceded by: Manuel Marrero Hueca
- Succeeded by: Angel Rodríguez Miranda

Personal details
- Born: July 13, 1965 (age 61) San Juan, Puerto Rico
- Party: New Progressive Party (PNP)
- Education: Universidad Metropolitana (BBA)

Nelson del Valle Colón (born July 13, 1965) is a Puerto Rican politician affiliated with the New Progressive Party (PNP). He was a member of the Puerto Rico House of Representatives from 2005 to 2008 and is the current representative of District 9. He has a degree in business administration from the Metropolitan University (Puerto Rico).

In 2008, Del Valle decided to run for Mayor of Toa Alta losing primaries. After his defeat in the primaries, Del Valle worked as a Legislative Aide to Representatives Toñito Silva and Rafael Rivera. On August 20, 2020, Del Valle was arrested by the FBI in Dorado, Puerto Rico. On August 26, 2020, Del Valle resigned from the Puerto Rico House of Representatives and was sentenced to 57 months in prison on September 7, 2022.
