= José E. Meléndez Ortiz =

Puerto Rico politician

José Enrique Meléndez Ortiz

Member of the Puerto Rico Senate from the Guayama district
- In office 1993–2001

Personal details
- Born: Coamo, Puerto Rico
- Party: New Progressive Party
- Spouse: Elba M. Ortiz Santiago
- Children: José Enrique; Elba M.
- Profession: Politician

José Enrique "Quique" Meléndez Ortiz is a Puerto Rican politician and former senator. He was a member of the Senate of Puerto Rico from 1992 to 2000.

Meléndez was elected to the Senate of Puerto Rico for the District of Guayama in the 1992 general elections. He was reelected in 1996. In 2000, Meléndez lost his seat at the 2000 general elections.

Meléndez is married to Elba M. Ortiz. They have two children: Elba and current representative José E. Meléndez Ortiz, Jr.
