= María Milagros Charbonier =

Puerto Rican politician (born 1963)

At-Large Member of the Puerto Rico House of Representatives
- In office January 2, 2013 – September 15, 2020

Secretary General of the New Progressive Party

Personal details
- Born: November 24, 1963 (age 62) Fajardo, Puerto Rico
- Party: New Progressive Party (PNP)
- Spouse: Orlando Montes Rivera.
- Education: University of Puerto Rico, Río Piedras Campus (B.A.); Interamerican University of Puerto Rico (J.D.)

María Milagros Charbonier Laureano (born November 24, 1963) is a Puerto Rican lawyer and politician who served as a member of the Puerto Rico House of Representatives from 2013 to 2020. She was elected to the Puerto Rico House of Representatives on the 2012 general election. She also served as Secretary General of the New Progressive Party (PNP). She is known for her controversial views against the LGBT community. She was arrested by the FBI in August 2020, and faces 13 charges of corruption for numerous crimes, which include theft and money laundering, perpetrated specifically through a kickback scheme.

== Early years and studies ==
María Milagros Charbonier was born on November 24, 1963, in Fajardo, Puerto Rico, to Roberto Charbonier and Milagros Laureano. She studied in various schools in the metropolitan area, graduating from high school in 1981 from the Dr. José M. Lázaro High School.

In 1986, Charbonier received a bachelor's degree in Arts, with a major in Social Science from the University of Puerto Rico in Río Piedras. After that, she completed a Juris doctor from the Interamerican University of Puerto Rico School of Law. Charbonier passed the bar exam, which allows her to practice law in Puerto Rico.

== Professional career ==
Charbonier has worked as an attorney, specializing in areas like family, criminal, constitutional, and environmental law. She has also served as legal advisor to various municipalities in the island. As such, she was chosen to represent the Delegation of Lawyers of Carolina. She was then elected as delegate to the board of directors of the Puerto Rico Bar Association, where she occupied the position of vice-president. In recent years, Charbonier served as administrative judge of the Special Education Program of the Puerto Rico Department of Education. She has also worked for the Puerto Rico Police Department and the Department of Family Affairs of Puerto Rico.

Charbonier has been censured by the Supreme Court of Puerto Rico for unethical conduct and faced three other complaints before the Supreme Court. The censure by the Supreme Court was handed down in 2002 after she issued an affidavit as a notary in which she stated two witnesses who were not present were present. She faced a second complaint in 2006 when two individuals, one of whom was a former police agent, submitted a complaint after Charbonier publicly accused them of selling information to drug dealers; the complaint was dismissed by the Court. In 2015 a third complaint was heard before the Court after allegations she had over billed for legal work performed for the municipality of Canovanas, this complaint was dismissed because a majority of the Justices believed that it was unreasonable to ask Charbonier to explain events that had happened over a decade ago. She now faces a fourth ethical complaint due to a contract written by her as a notary in 1999.

== Political career ==
Charbonier served as Secretary General of the New Progressive Party (PNP) during Pedro Rosselló's tenure as Governor of Puerto Rico.

She appeared in a ballot for the first time in 2008 when she ran for delegate from Puerto Rico to the 2008 Democratic National Convention. She was pledged to then Senator Barack Obama. She subsequently switched to the Republican Party and ran for delegate to the 2016 Republican National Convention, pledged to Ben Carson.

Charbonier won a spot on the PNP ballot at the primaries earlier in 2012. She arrived in fifth place in the voting. She was elected at the 2012 elections, receiving the second highest number of votes within her party, behind incumbent Speaker Jenniffer González.

After her reelection in 2016, Charbonier was named as the president of the House of Representatives of Puerto Rico Commission of the Judiciary.

She is a controversial figure in politics due to her traditional views on LGBT individuals, the legalization of marijuana, among other subjects. As part of her anti-LGBT activism Charbonier has attempted to block same-sex marriage through the Courts by suing the governor arguing that the Supreme Court of the United States' decision in Obergefell v. Hodges did not apply to Puerto Rico because of its status as an unincorporated territory. The Supreme Court of Puerto Rico handed down an opinion dismissing the claim and stating that the plaintiffs did not have a remote chance of prevailing. She has also been criticized for attempts at legalizing discrimination against LGBT individuals through religious exemptions and legislation. During public hearings in 2013 on a bill to extend protections against domestic violence to same sex couples, Charbonier compared homosexuality to pedophilia and bestiality, drawing criticism for other legislators and LGBTQ activists.

On August 17, 2020, Charbonier was arrested by the FBI for multiple public corruption cases that were under investigation. The charges includes theft, bribery, kickbacks, and money laundering. The federal grand jury 13-count indictment is against Charbonier herself, her husband Orlando Montes-Rivera (Montes), their son Orlando Gabriel Montes-Charbonier, and Charbonier assistant Frances Acevedo-Ceballos (Acevedo). She presented her letter of resignation the next day, which will be effective on September 15, 2020.

In May 2024, the Federal Prosecutor's Office requested a 15-year prison sentence against María Milagros Charbonier Laureano, convicted of inflating the salary of one of her legislative employees to pay him bribes every two weeks.

In May 2025, Federal Judge Sylvia Carreño Coll ordered former Representative María Milagros Charbonier and her husband, Orlando Montes, to repay the Puerto Rican government $136,500 stolen in the bribery and kickback scheme for which they were both convicted in January 2024. The judge also accepted the federal prosecutor's calculation based on the fact that the couple received 91 bi-monthly payments of $1,500 over three and a half years after inflating the salary of their former legislative receptionist, Frances Acevedo, who pleaded guilty to paying bribes during the conspiracy. The judge denied Orlando Montes' request to take only $6,500 of the total restitution, arguing that he played a minor role in the conspiracy. The judge asked the Federal Probation Office to submit a payment schedule based on Charbonier and Montes' financial situation, for June 2, 2025. The couple's son, Orlando Gabriel Montes Charbonier, was also accused of helping collect the bi-monthly $1,500 payments made through bank deposits, ATH Móvil transactions, and cash envelopes. However, the court dismissed all seven criminal charges against him after he participated in a pretrial diversion (PTD) program.

== Personal life ==
As of 2012, María Milagros Charbonier had been married for 28 years with attorney Orlando Montes Rivera. They have two children. On August 17, 2020, the FBI arrested Charbonier along with her husband and son.
