= Víctor M. Torres =

Puerto Rican politician (born 1969)

Víctor Manuel Torres

Member of the Puerto Rico House of Representatives from the 23rd District
- In office January 2, 2017 – January 2, 2021
- Preceded by: Luis Elí Torres Monsegur
- Succeeded by: José Rivera Madera

Personal details
- Born: May 8, 1969 (age 57) Yauco, Puerto Rico
- Party: New Progressive Party (PNP)
- Education: Instituto de Banca y Comercio

Víctor Manuel Torres González (born May 8, 1969) is a Puerto Rican politician affiliated with the New Progressive Party (PNP). He has been a member of the Puerto Rico House of Representatives since 2017 representing District 23.

== Early years and studies ==
Born in Yauco, Puerto Rico, Torres González studied at the Ponce College of Technology. In the year 1990, he graduated with high honors in computer programming career. A year later, he completed banking and accounting studies at the Instituto de Banca y Comercio.

== Political career ==
He began his career in public service in 2002 to be appointed Vice mayor of the city of Yauco under the leadership of the mayor, Hon. Abel Nazario Quiñones. In 2005 he worked as an advisor on municipal Affairs of the Senate of Puerto Rico for Senate president Hon. Kenneth McClintock. After completing his duties in the Senate presidency, was named Superintendent of the Capitol of Puerto Rico. Was elected to the Puerto Rico House of Representatives at the 2016 elections for the 23rd district. He is vice-president of the Commission of the South region and member of the Commissions of finance, ethics, consumer affairs, banking and insurance and municipal affairs.

== Personal life ==
He is married to Jessicalís Rivera and they have one son and two daughters.
