= Yashira Lebrón Rodríguez =

Puerto Rican politician (born 1981)

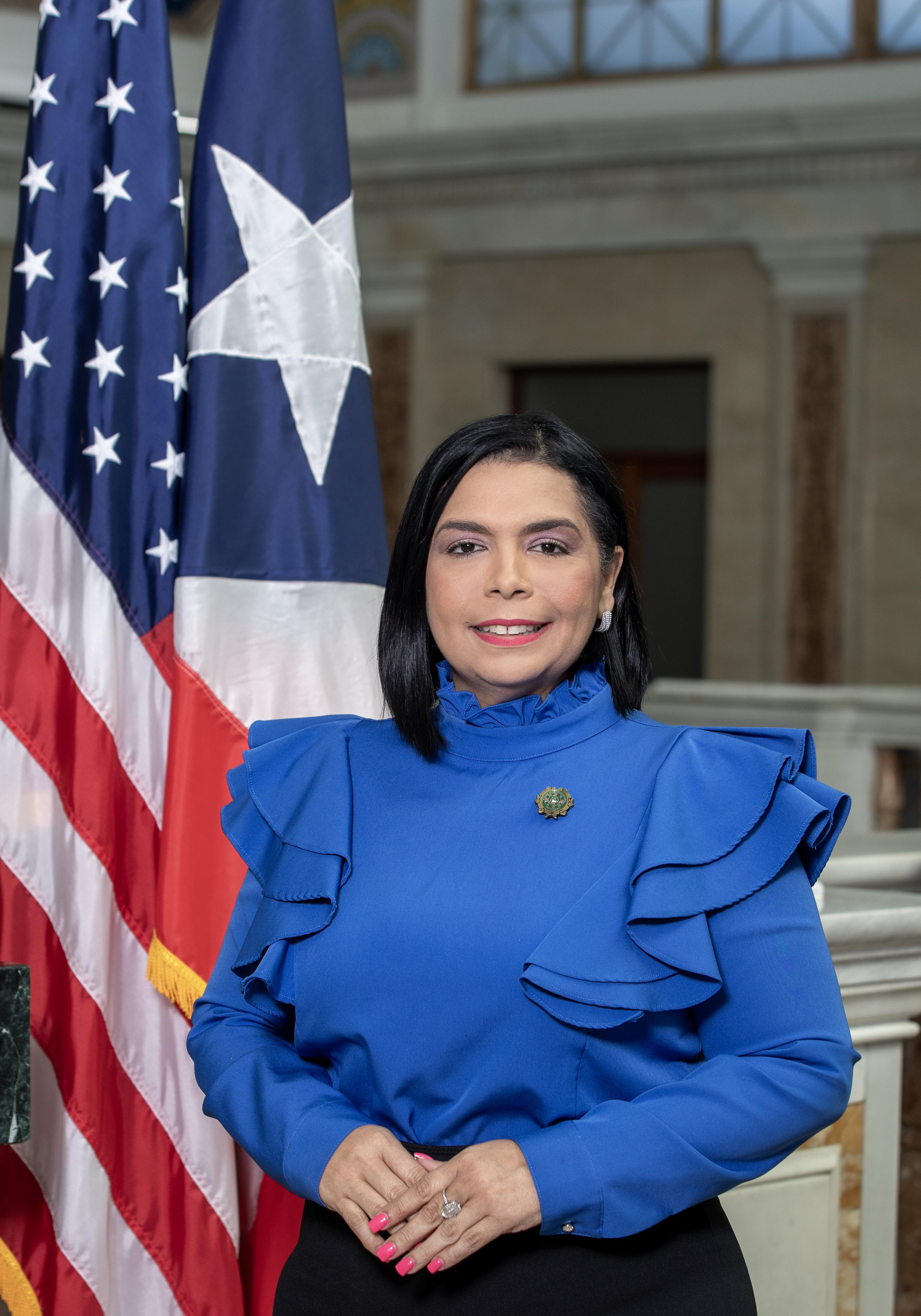

Member of the Puerto Rico House of Representatives from the 8th District
- Incumbent
- Assumed office October 23, 2014
- Preceded by: Antonio "Toñito" Silva

Personal details
- Born: July 24, 1981 (age 45) Bayamón, Puerto Rico
- Party: New Progressive Party (PNP)
- Education: University of Puerto Rico (BA); Interamerican University of Puerto Rico (MCJ)

Yashira Lebrón Rodríguez (born July 24, 1981) is a politician from Puerto Rico and current legislator for District 8 in the 29th House of Representatives of Puerto Rico. Lebrón filled the vacancy left by Antonio "Toñito" Silva after Silva resigned from his position.

== Early years and studies ==
Graduated from Dr. Agustin Stahl High School in Bayamón. She possesses a bachelor's degree in political science from the University of Puerto Rico and a master's degree in criminal justice from the Interamerican University of Puerto Rico.

== Political life ==
She served two term in the Municipal Assembly of Bayamon and was the vice-president of the Municipal Legislature of Bayamón. On October 23, 2014, she replaced Antonio "Toñito" Silva for his seat as the representative for District 8th. She was reelected in the 2016 General Election. Lebrón Rodríguez is currently the president of the House of Representatives of Puerto Rico Commission on Consumer, Banking and Insurance Affairs.
