= José Aponte Hernández =

Puerto Rican politician

José F. Aponte Hernández
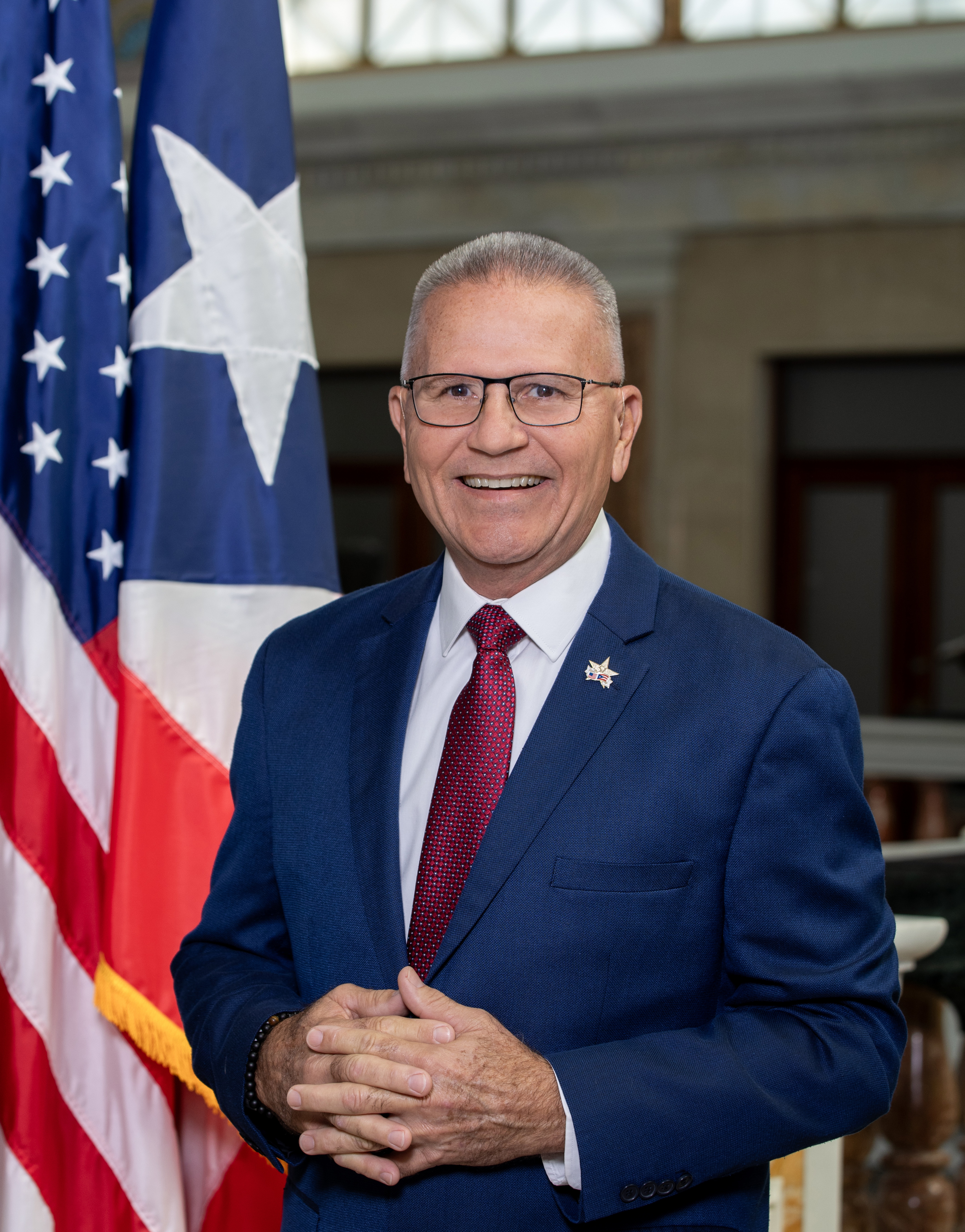

Secretary General of the New Progressive Party
- In office 2013–2016
- Preceded by: José Torres Zamora
- Succeeded by: June Rivera

28th Speaker of the Puerto Rico House of Representatives
- In office January 10, 2005 – January 1, 2009
- Governor: Aníbal Acevedo Vilá
- Preceded by: Carlos Vizcarrondo Irizarry
- Succeeded by: Jenniffer González Colón

At-Large Member of the Puerto Rico House of Representatives
- Incumbent
- Assumed office January 1, 2005
- Preceded by: Oscar Ramos Meléndez

Member of the Puerto Rico House of Representatives from the District 33
- In office 2000 – January 1, 2005
- Preceded by: Néstor Aponte Hernández
- Succeeded by: Ángel R. Peña Rosa

Personal details
- Born: January 19, 1958 (age 68) San Juan, Puerto Rico
- Party: New Progressive
- Other political affiliations: Republican
- Spouse: Aida Rodríguez Roig
- Education: University of Puerto Rico (B.Acy)
- Occupation: Accountant

José F. Aponte Hernández (born January 19, 1958) is an accountant and former Speaker of the House of Representatives of Puerto Rico.

== Personal life ==
Aponte was born in San Juan. Graduated from Colegio Católico Notre Dame High School in Caguas, Puerto Rico. He obtained a bachelor's degree in Accounting from the University of Puerto Rico at Rio Piedras in 1980. He is married to Aida I. Rodríguez Roig, and has two sons and one daughter. He currently resides in San Lorenzo. He was the New Progressive Party (PNP) General Secretary during the Rosselló administration. One of his older brothers, Néstor, is a state appellate judge, while another, Jorge, was the Director of the Office of Management and Budget during the Rosselló administration.

== Career ==
He served as Secretary-General of the New Progressive Party from 1996 to 1997 (acting) and 1997 to 1999.

Aponte was appointed to fill the vacancy left by his brother Néstor Aponte Hernández, as Representative from the 33rd District, after he resigned to become an Appellate Court Judge. Aponte was elected as Representative in the 2000 general elections, and was re-elected as an At-Large Representative in the 2004, 2008, and 2012 general elections.

After the New Progressive Party elected 32 members of the 51-seat House of Representatives in the 2004 general elections, Aponte was elected the 28th Speaker of the House on January 10. He is also a member of the Puerto Rico Republican Party. He was defeated in his bid for re-election for Speaker by the new 37-member majority New Progressive Party caucus, which elected then Government Affairs Committee Chairwoman, Jenniffer A. González Colón.

Aponte has advocated for statehood supporting a project for statehood in 2010 and asking congress in 2016 to prioritise admitting Puerto Rico as a state .

During the COVID-19 pandemic, Aponte spoke out against retailers who were operating game machines in their establishments, explaining that if the casinos were not allowed to operate during the pandemic neither should these smaller establishments.

In February 2023, he pleaded for statehood for Puerto Rico before the Congress of the United States of America..

House of Representatives of Puerto Rico
Preceded by Néstor Aponte Hernández	Member of the Puerto Rico House of Representatives from the 33rd district 2000–2005	Succeeded by Ángel R. Peña Rosa
Political offices
Preceded by Carlos Vizcarrondo Irizarry	Speaker of the Puerto Rico House of Representatives; 2005–2009	Succeeded by Jenniffer González
