= Toñito Silva =

Puerto Rican politician

Antonio "Toñito" Silva

Member of the Puerto Rico House of Representatives from the 8th District
- In office 1993–2014
- Preceded by: Herbert Torres Quiles
- Succeeded by: Yashira Lebrón Rodríguez

Personal details
- Born: Bayamón, Puerto Rico
- Party: New Progressive Party (PNP)
- Other political affiliations: Republican

Antonio "Toñito" Silva Delgado is a Puerto Rican politician. He has been a member of the Puerto Rico House of Representatives since 1993.

Before been elected to the Puerto Rico House of Representatives Silva was the president of the Bayamón Municipal Assembly. He was first elected to the House of Representatives at the 1992 general election. He represents the District 8. Silva has been reelected five times (1996, 2000, 2004, 2008, 2012).

Silva is married to Yvonne Santiago. He also has three children from a previous marriage to Jenny Rivera: Antonio, Jenning, and Anthony. His youngest son, Anthony, died on June 15, 2010, from complications caused after an accident in a four-wheel ATV.
