= Ángel Bulerín =

Puerto Rican politician

Angel Bulerín
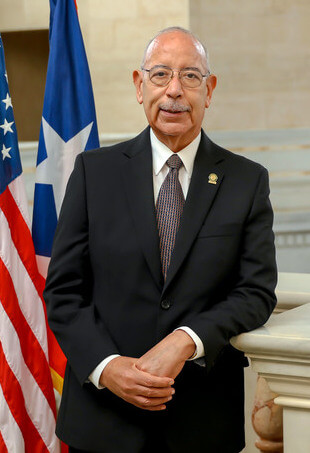
- Representative Ángel Bulerín in 2021

Member of the Puerto Rico House of Representatives from the 37th District
- In office January 2, 1993 – January 2, 2025
- Preceded by: José Miguel del Valle
- Succeeded by: Carmen Medina Calderón

Mayor of Río Grande
- In office 1985–1989
- Preceded by: Wilfredo Mercado Ortíz
- Succeeded by: Blanca Medina

Member of the Municipal Assembly of Río Grande, Puerto Rico
- In office 1977–1984

Personal details
- Born: Ángel L. Bulerín Ramos; March 19, 1949 (age 77) Fajardo, Puerto Rico
- Party: New Progressive Party (PNP)
- Spouse: Ramonita Colón
- Children: Omarys; Angel Luis
- Education: University of Puerto Rico (BBA)

Ángel L. Bulerín Ramos (born March 19, 1949, in Fajardo, Puerto Rico) is a Puerto Rican politician. He has been a member of the Puerto Rico House of Representatives since 1992.

== Early years and studies ==
Bulerín Ramos was born in Fajardo, Puerto Rico. He has three siblings.

Bulerín completed his elementary and high school studies in Río Grande. He then obtained a bachelor's degree in business administration, with a major in Accounting and Finances from the University of Puerto Rico.

== Public service career ==
In 1968, Bulerín began working at the Personnel Office of the Government of Puerto Rico, specifically in the Retirement Division. After that, he worked in the Department of Employment (1969-1975) and the Health Department (1977-1984).

== Political career ==
From January 1977 to December 1984, Bulerín served as a member of the Municipal Legislature of Río Grande, where he presided over the Treasury Commission.

In 1984, he ran for Mayor of Río Grande for the New Progressive Party (PNP), and was elected at the 1984 general elections.

In 1992, Bulerín decided to run for the House of Representatives to represent District 37. After winning a spot at the 1992 PNP primaries, he was elected at the general election that same year. Bulerín has been reelected seven times (1996, 2000, 2004, 2008, 2012, 2016, 2020). Decided not to seek reelection in 2024.

== Personal life ==
Bulerín is married to Ramonita Colón. They have two children (Omarys and Angel Luis), and four grandchildren (Andrea, Angélica, Adriana and Alejandra). The older, Andrea Sofía, is a ballerina, Angélica is a volleyball player and Adriana and Alejandra are soccer players.

House of Representatives of Puerto Rico
Preceded by José Miguel del Valle	Member of the Puerto Rico House of Representatives from the 37th District; 1993–2014	Succeeded by Carmen Medina Calderón
Political offices
Preceded by Wilfredo Mercado Ortíz	Mayor of Río Grande, Puerto Rico; 1985–1989	Succeeded by Blanca Medina
