= Luis Pérez Ortiz =

Puerto Rican politician (born 1955)

Luis "Junior" Pérez
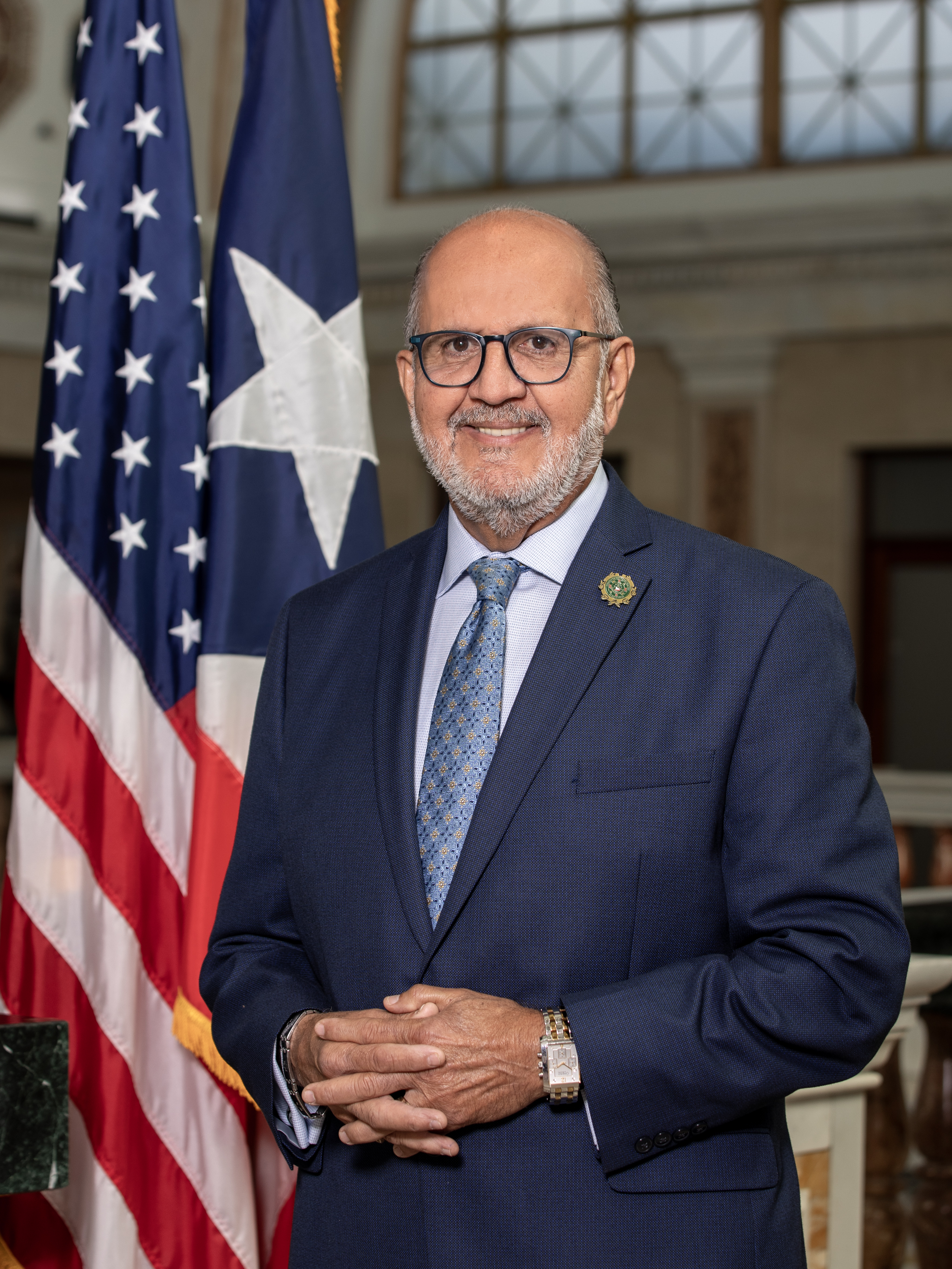

Member of the Puerto Rico House of Representatives from the 7th District
- Incumbent
- Assumed office 1998

Personal details
- Born: September 5, 1955 (age 70) Bayamón, Puerto Rico
- Party: New Progressive Party (PNP)

Luis "Junior" Pérez Ortiz Jr (born September 5, 1955) is a Puerto Rican politician affiliated with the New Progressive Party (PNP). He has been a member of the Puerto Rico House of Representatives since 1998 representing District 7.

== Early years and studies ==
Luis Pérez Ortiz was born on September 5, 1955, in Bayamón, Puerto Rico. He has four siblings.

Pérez studied at the Parcelas Van Scoy Elementary School, and continued in María Vázquez de Umpierre Junior High School. He completed high school at Dr. Agustín Stahl High School in Bayamón. He has taken several courses in Business Administration.

== Professional career ==
Pérez began working from a young age. He worked for more than 12 years in various private companies like Belk Lindsey, Almacénes Gonzalo Rivera, and Holsum Bakers of Puerto Rico.

== Public service ==
In 1985, Pérez began serving as Planning Official for the Civil Defense. He later worked as Director of the Tomás Kuilan Public Transportation Terminal in Bayamón. In September 1987, he became Director of the Municipal Civil Defense. In 1997, the Mayor of Bayamón, Ramón Luis Rivera, appointed Pérez as Director of the Public Safety Department of Bayamón.

== Political career ==
In 1998, Pérez decided to run for a seat in the House of Representatives of Puerto Rico representing District 7. He has been reelected to that position four times (2000, 2004, 2008, 2012).

== Personal life ==
Pérez has been married since 1978. He has three children.
