= June Rivera =

Puerto Rican politician (born 1969)

Rafael "June" Rivera Ortega

Member of the Puerto Rico House of Representatives from the 28th District
- In office January 2, 2005 – January 2, 2021
- Preceded by: Felito Marrero
- Succeeded by: Juan José Santiago Nieves

Secretary General of the New Progressive Party
- In office December 17, 2016 – July 21, 2019

Personal details
- Born: November 10, 1969 (age 56) San Juan, Puerto Rico
- Party: New Progressive Party (PNP)
- Children: Amaia Kamilah
- Education: Interamerican University of Puerto Rico (BBA)

Rafael "June" Rivera Ortega (born November 10, 1969) is a Puerto Rican politician affiliated with the New Progressive Party (PNP). He was a member of the Puerto Rico House of Representatives from 2005 to 2021 representing District 28.

== Early years and studies ==
Rafael Rivera Ortega was born in San Juan, Puerto Rico on November 10, 1969. He began his primary studies at the Lomas Vallés School, and in 1988 graduated from his high school at the Santa Teresita Academy in Naranjito. June was always in trouble at school. One time he called school to announce that a bomb would be detonated, causing an emergency evacuation of Academia Santa Teresita. He was later discovered as the caller, along with several students and was punished to clean the school premises for a whole year.

Rivera first completed an Associate degree in Information Systems. He then completed a Bachelor's degree in Business Management, with a major in Marketing, from the Interamerican University of Puerto Rico.

== Professional career ==
Since his years in college, Rivera worked as Sub-manager for Rivera's Commercial, Inc. in his hometown. He is also a former member of the Board of the Association of Retailers, Professionals, and Civic Leaders of Naranjito, and of the Chamber of Commerce of Puerto Rico.

== Political career ==
Rivera began his political career with the New Progressive Party as a voting college employee, and then as both coordinator and president of electoral units. He also served as State Director of the PNP Youth. When he was 26 years old, Rivera became the youngest elected to the Municipal Assembly of Naranjito.

Rivera was elected to the House of Representatives of Puerto Rico to represent District 28 at the 2004 general election. He was reelected in 2008, 2012 and 2016. He lost to Juan José Santiago Nieves (PPD) in the 2020 general election.

== Personal life ==
Rivera has a daughter called Amaia Kamilah Rivera Morales.
