= 2016 Puerto Rico primaries =

The 2016 Puerto Rico primaries may refer to:

- 2016 United States presidential primaries in Puerto Rico
  - 2016 Puerto Rico Democratic primary
  - 2016 Puerto Rico Republican primary
- Territorial government primaries
  - 2016 New Progressive Party of Puerto Rico primaries
  - 2016 Popular Democratic Party of Puerto Rico primaries
