= 2003 New Progressive Party of Puerto Rico primaries =

New Progressive Party primaries, 2003
- November 9, 2003
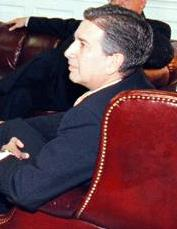

Nominee	Pedro Rosselló	Carlos Pesquera
Party	New Progressive	New Progressive
Popular vote	449,315	139,898
Percentage	75.82%	23.61%
Previous PNP Governor candidate
Carlos Pesquera
PNP Governor candidate-elect
Pedro Rosselló

The 2003 New Progressive Party primaries were the primary elections by which voters of the New Progressive Party (PNP) chose its nominees for various political offices of Puerto Rico, namely the position of governor, for the 2004 general elections. Former Governor Pedro Rosselló was selected as the nominee at the primary elections held on November 9, 2003. He would go on to narrowly lose the 2004 general election against Aníbal Acevedo Vilá, from the Popular Democratic Party (PPD).

== Candidates ==
=== Governor ===
- Pedro Rosselló, former Governor of Puerto Rico
- Carlos Pesquera, former candidate to Governor

=== Resident Commissioner ===
- Luis Fortuño, former Secretary of Tourism
- Carlos Romero Barceló, former Governor and Resident Commissioner
- Charlie Rodríguez, former President of the Senate of Puerto Rico
- Miriam Ramírez de Ferrer, former Senator
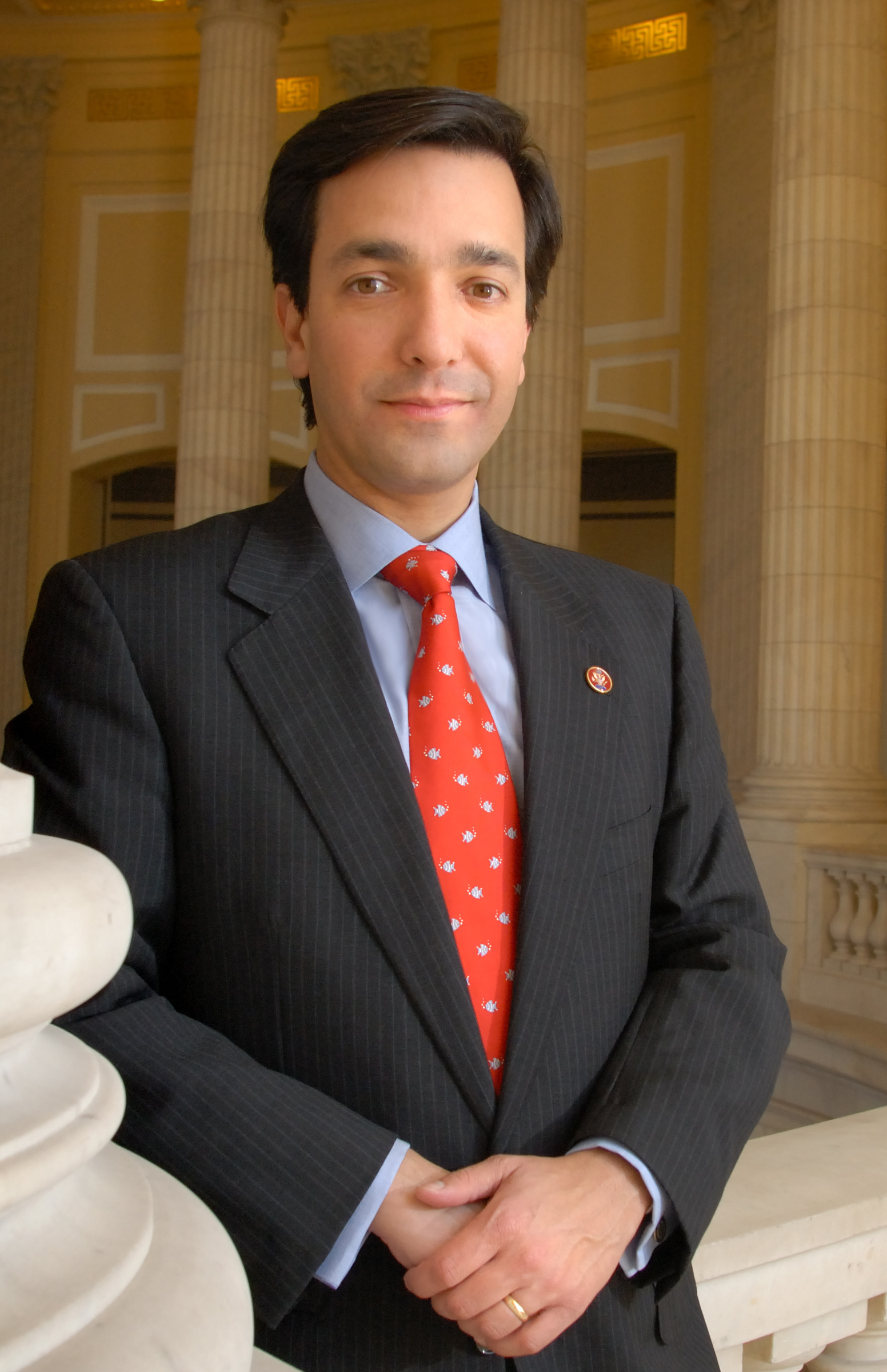
Luis Fortuño

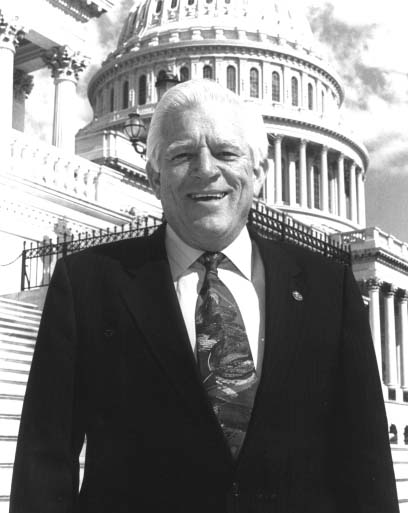
Carlos Romero Barceló

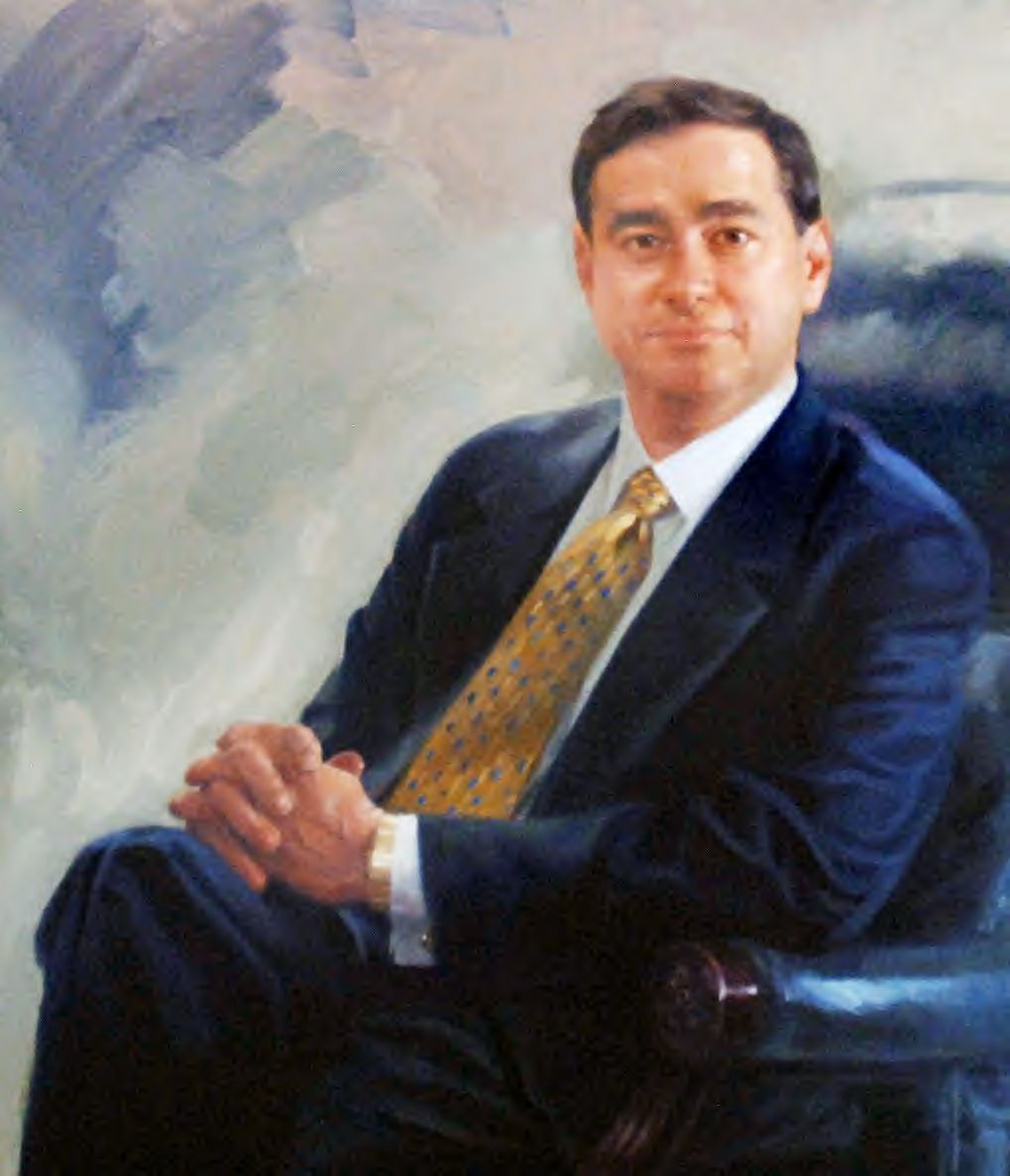
Charlie Rodríguez

=== Senate ===
==== At-large ====
- Lucy Arce
- Norma Burgos
- Jorge de Castro Font
- Epifanio
- Tomás Fantauzzi
- José Garriga Picó
- Jaime Irizarry
- Armando Izquierdo
- Kenneth McClintock
- José Enrique Meléndez
- Peter Muller
- Luis Felipe Navas
- Orlando Parga
- Genaro Sánchez
- Jesús Soto Amadeo
- Viruet

==== District ====
The New Progressive Party held primaries on all 8 of the senatorial districts.

===== San Juan =====
- Roberto Arango
- Donald Cintrón Avilés
- Carlos Díaz
- Danny López

===== Bayamón =====
- Pablo LaFontaine
- Migdalia Padilla
- Carmelo Ríos Santiago
- José L. Ortega Rivera

===== Arecibo =====
- Calvin
- José Emilio González Velázquez
- Víctor David Loubriel
- Waldemar Quiles

===== Mayagüez-Aguadilla =====
- Monica Alpi
- Carlos Arocho
- Luis Daniel Muñiz Cortes
- Michael Nazario
- Armando Nieves Ramos
- Carlos Pagán

===== Ponce =====
- Elyod Maldonado Zeda
- María Meléndez
- Delly Mercado Arroyo
- Andrés Rivera
- Luis Armando Rivera
- Linnette Toledo
- Luinel Torres Acosta
- Nilda Vega Santiago

===== Guayama =====
- Negroni
- Margarita Nolasco
- Osvaldo Ortolaza Figueroa
- Gerald Quiles Ocasio

===== Humacao =====
- Papo Dávila
- Pickie Díaz
- Gabriel Santiago
- Rafael "Rafy" Uceta

===== Carolina =====
- José Julio Díaz
- Héctor Martínez Maldonado
- Pablo Ramos
- Lornna Soto

=== House of Representatives ===
==== At-large ====
- José Aponte
- Edgar Berríos
- José Chico
- Rolando Crespo
- José Luis Díaz
- Rafael Escudero
- Jenniffer González
- Luis Maldonado
- Edwin Mundo
- Omar Negrón
- Lourdes Ramos
- Harold Jim Rivera
- Iris Miriam Ruíz
- Augusto Sánchez
- Luis David Valentín

==== District ====
The New Progressive Party held primaries on 33 of the 40 representative districts.

===== District 1 =====
- Junior González
- José "Nuno" López

===== District 2 =====
- Junior Echevarría
- Diego García Cruz
- William Muriel
- José Serrano

===== District 3 =====
- Tamara Pérez
- Albita Rivera

===== District 4 =====
- Anthony
- Liza Fernández
- Julio Lebrón Lamboy

===== District 5 =====
- Pedro López Santos
- Jorge Navarro Suárez
- Juan Carlos Rodríguez

===== District 6 =====
- José Marquéz
- Angel Pérez Otero

===== District 9 =====
- Nelson del Valle
- Angel García
- Annie González
- Juan "Papo" Soto

===== District 10 =====
- Irma López
- Bernardo Márquez García

===== District 11 =====
- José de Jesús
- Edwin Ocasio

===== District 12 =====
- Edward Santiago
- Héctor Torres Calderón
- Víctor

===== District 13 =====
- Gaby Padilla
- Portalatín
- Gabriel Rodríguez Aguiló

===== District 14 =====
- Hiram Cruz
- Carlos Molina
- Santos González
- Yamill

===== District 16 =====
- Gilberto Ramírez Peña
- Iván Rodríguez
- Enrique Ruíz Gerena

===== District 17 =====
- Ricardo Pitre
- José L. Rivera Guerra
- Wilo Cabán

===== District 18 =====
- Charlie Arroyo
- Tomás Bonilla Feliciano
- Jorge Cajigas

===== District 20 =====
- Norman Ramírez Rivera
- Maureen Marchany
- Enobel Santiago

===== District 21 =====
- Peter Domenech
- Edgardo Irizarry

===== District 22 =====
- Héctor Luis "Tito" Camacho
- Jorge "Jorgito" Pérez
- Javier Rivera Aquino

===== District 23 =====
- Juan García Zavála
- Migdalia Irizarry
- Heri Martínez Piña

===== District 24 =====
- José Alberto Banchs
- John Giménez
- José Moreno
- Wisteria Tejero

===== District 26 =====
- Arkel
- José Luis Jiménez

===== District 27 =====
- Carlos Miguel Fuentes
- Juan Soto

===== District 28 =====
- Miguel Martínez
- Mario Nevárez Rosado
- Erio Quiñones
- Rafael Rivera Ortega

===== District 29 =====
- Luis Aramburu
- Pedro "Banchy" Cintrón

===== District 30 =====
- Pablo Bonelli
- Víctor Juan Enriquez
- Jorge "Borgie" Ramos

===== District 31 =====
- José Ramón Díaz
- Rafael Flores
- José Rivera

===== District 32 =====
- Arnaldo Báez Neris
- Angel Redondo

===== District 33 =====
- Denisse
- Angel R. Peña Rosa

===== District 34 =====
- Cristóbal Colón Ruiz
- Pedro Rodríguez

===== District 37 =====
- Angel Bulerín
- Elías Rivera

===== District 38 =====
- Eric Correa
- Raymond Sánchez

===== District 39 =====
- Chaguito
- Sergio Esteves
- Rafy Reyes

===== District 40 =====
- Epifanio Jiménez
- Josué David Collazo

== Results ==
The primaries were held on November 9, 2003. In it, Pedro Rosselló comfortably defeated Carlos Pesquera to win the spot for Governor at the 2004 elections. Also, Luis Fortuño defeated Carlos Romero Barceló, Charlie Rodríguez and Miriam Ramírez de Ferrer to win the spot for Resident Commissioner.

=== Governor ===
Candidate	Popular vote	Percentage
Pedro Rosselló	449,315	75.82%
Carlos Pesquera	139,898	23.61%
Others	3,378	0.57%

=== Resident Commissioner ===
Candidate	Popular vote	Percentage
Luis Fortuño	363,217	61.36%
Carlos Romero Barceló	151,898	25.66%
Charlie Rodríguez	37,828	6.39%
Miriam Ramírez de Ferrer	25,075	4.24%
Others	64	0.01%

=== Senate ===
==== At-large ====
Candidate	Popular vote	Percentage
Norma Burgos	414,819	14.54%
Jorge de Castro Font	384,113	13.47%
Kenneth McClintock	353,344	12.39%
Orlando Parga	251,920	8.83%
Lucy Arce	227,455	7.97%
José Garriga Picó	174,361	6.11
Tomás Fantauzzi	159,157	5.58%
José Enrique Meléndez	141,018	4.94%
Epifanio	129,058	4.52%
Viruet	108,100	3.79%
Jesús Soto Amadeo	107,173	3.76%
Genaro Sánchez	94,305	3.31%
Luis Felipe Navas	85,272	2.99%
Peter Muller	80,167	2.81%
Jaime Irizarry	65,734	2.32%
Armando Izquierdo	52,355	1.84%
Others	23,910	0.85%

=== House of Representatives ===
==== At-large ====
Candidate	Popular vote	Percentage
Jenniffer González	351,424	12.66%
José Aponte	318,419	11.47%
Iris Miriam Ruíz	305,146	10.99%
Lourdes Ramos	240,761	8.67%
José Chico	219,136	7.89%
Rolando Crespo	209,862	7.56
Edwin Mundo	193,226	6.96%
Rafi Escudero	183,164	6.60%
Omar Negrón	167,296	6.03%
Luis David Valentín	147,772	5.32%
Luis Maldonado	121,228	4.37%
Augusto Sánchez	105,525	3.80%
Harold Jim Rivera	66,270	2.39%
Edgar Berríos	54,128	1.95%
Others	30,793	1.09%

== See also ==
- Popular Democratic Party primaries, 2003
