= 2016 New Progressive Party of Puerto Rico primaries =

New Progressive Party primaries, 2016
- June 5, 2016
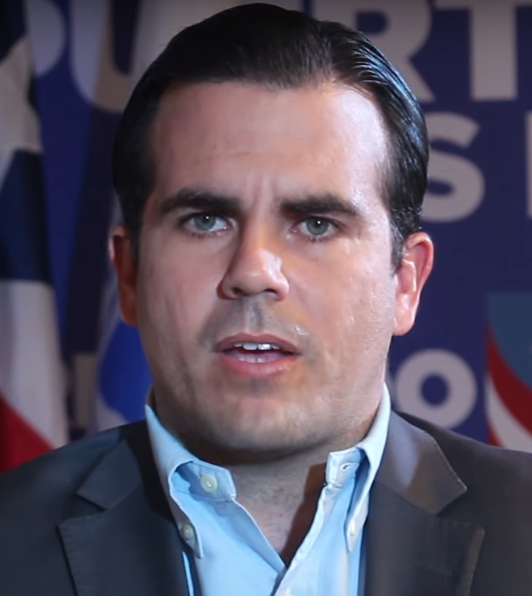

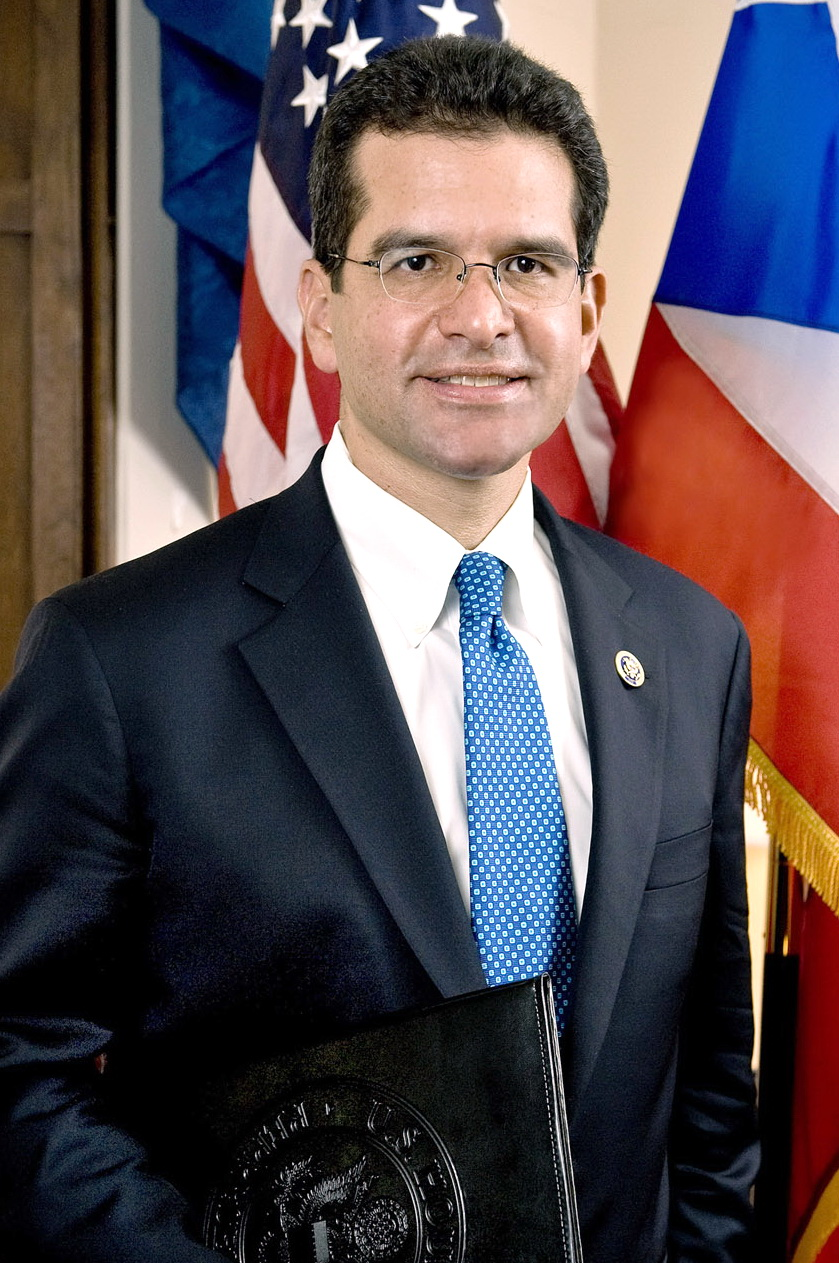
Nominee	Ricardo Rosselló	Pedro Pierluisi
Party	New Progressive	New Progressive
Alliance	Democratic	Democratic
Popular vote	236,524	226,449
Percentage	51.09%	48.91%
- Results by county or municipality
Previous Previous PNP Governor candidate
Luis Fortuño
PNP Governor candidate-elect
Ricardo Rosselló

The 2016 New Progressive Party primaries was the primary elections by which voters of the New Progressive Party (PNP) chose its nominees for various political offices of Puerto Rico for the 2016 general elections. They were held on June 5, 2016, and also coincided with the Democratic Party primaries in the island.

== Candidates ==
=== Governor ===
- Pedro Pierluisi, incumbent Resident Commissioner of Puerto Rico
- Ricky Rosselló, scientist and political activist, son of former Governor of Puerto Rico Pedro Rosselló

=== Resident Commissioner ===
- Jenniffer González, incumbent member and former Speaker of the House of Representatives of Puerto Rico
- Carlos Pesquera, former Secretary of the Puerto Rico Department of Transportation and Public Works and gubernatorial candidate

=== Senate ===
==== At-large ====
- Frankie Amador
- Alba Iris Calderón
- Iván Díaz Carrasquillo
- Ramón Díaz
- Javier García Cabán
- Zoé Laboy
- Abel Nazario
- Margarita Nolasco Santiago
- Itzamar Peña
- Eric "Javo" Ramírez
- Mario Ramos Méndez
- Thomas Rivera Schatz
- María Salgado Sánchez
- Larry Seilhamer
- José Chemo Soto
- Johanne Vélez

=== House of Representatives ===
==== At-large ====
- Néstor Alonso
- José Aponte
- Jorge Emmanuel Báez
- María Milagros Charbonier
- Joe Colón
- José Enrique Meléndez
- José Olmos Muñíz
- Lourdes Ramos
- Roberto Rivera
- Hiram Torres Montalvo
- José "Pichy" Torres Zamora
- Jesús Vélez

== Results ==
The primaries were held on June 5, 2016. In it, newcomer Ricky Rosselló narrowly defeated incumbent Resident Commissioner Pedro Pierluisi to win the spot for Governor at the 2016 elections. Also, Jenniffer González comfortably defeated Carlos Pesquera with 71% of the votes to win the spot for Resident Commissioner.

=== Governor ===
Candidate	Popular vote	Percentage
Ricky Rosselló	236,524	51.09%
Pedro Pierluisi	226,449	48.91%

=== Resident Commissioner ===
Candidate	Popular vote	Percentage
Jenniffer González	323,893	70.54%
Carlos Pesquera	135,246	29.46%

=== Senate ===
==== At-large ====
Candidate	Popular vote	Percentage
Thomas Rivera Schatz	361,362	16.67%
Larry Seilhamer	271,780	12.54
Zoé Laboy	251,732	11.61
Abel Nazario	216,472	9.99
Margarita Nolasco	213,886	9.87
Itzamar Peña	203,609	9.39
José Chemo Soto	123,126	5.68
Johanne Vélez García	108,855	5.02
Alba Iris Calderón	72,397	3.34
Eric "Javo" Ramírez	64,301	2.97
Javier García Cabán	58,211	2.69
Ramón Díaz	53,810	2.48
Iván Díaz Carrasquillo	46,729	2.16
Frankie Amador	46,634	2.15
Mario Ramos Méndez	39,059	1.80
María Salgado Sánchez	35,661	1.65

=== House of Representatives ===
==== At-large ====
Candidate	Popular vote	Percentage
María Milagros Charbonier	267,662	13.53%
Lourdes Ramos	266,421	13.47%
José Kikito Meléndez	261,172	13.20%
José "Pichy" Torres Zamora	256,470	12.97%
José Aponte	210,191	10.63%
Néstor Alonso	179,629	9.08%
Hiram Torres Montalvo	144,551	7.31%
Jorge Emmanuel Báez	101,584	5.14%
Roberto Rivera	98,472	4.98%
Jesús Vélez	79,675	4.03%
Joe Colón	62,205	3.15%
José Olmos Muñíz	49,868	2.52%

== See also ==
- Popular Democratic Party of Puerto Rico primaries, 2016
