= Senator Pico =

Senator Pico may refer to:

- Andrés Pico (1810–1876), California State Senate
- José Garriga Picó (born 1948), Senate of Puerto Rico
