= Gabriel Hernández-Rodríguez =

Puerto Rican politician

Mayor of Camuy
- Incumbent
- Assumed office 2020
- Preceded by: Edwin García Feliciano

Personal details
- Born: March 19, 1985 (age 41) Chicago, Illinois
- Party: New Progressive Party (PNP)
- Education: University of Puerto Rico at Mayagüez (BBA); Universidad del Este (MBA)

Gabriel Hernández-Rodríguez , son of Domingo Hernández and Maricruz Rodríguez, both natives of Camuy, Puerto Rico, was born on March 19, 1985, in the city of Chicago, Illinois, where he resided during his first year of life, until his mother moved to Paterson, New Jersey, where he lived until he turned 7. At that age, he moved to Camuy, where he lived during his childhood and adolescence in the Péndula sector of Barrio Santiago.

In 2003, he graduated with honors from Santiago R. Palmer High School, now known as Miguel Felipe Santiago High School in Camuy. During his freshman college year, he received a scholarship from the Camuy Savings and Loan Cooperative. He was admitted in 2003 to the School of Business of the University of Puerto Rico at Mayagüez, where he obtained a bachelor's degree in business, majoring in Industrial Management and Human Resources in 2008. Admitted in 2010 to Universidad del Este in Carolina, Puerto Rico, where he received a master's degree in Public Affairs (MPA) in 2012.

Hernández-Rodríguez began his career in public service in 2008 as a Special Assistant in the Puerto Rico Senate. That same year, he was elected a member of the City Council of Camuy, a post to which he was reelected in 2012 and 2016, and in which he chaired the Youth Affairs Committee. He served until his resignation on February 21, 2020. Two of his most important municipal ordinances were one that created the William Rosales-Pérez Municipal Legislative Internship for high school seniors and college freshmen, and another creating the “Camuy Recycles and Wins” program that recognizes the three Camuy secondary schools that recycle the most.

He was appointed by Governor Luis Fortuño in 2012 as a member of the board of directors of the Puerto Rico Electric Power Authority (PREPA) the largest public power company in the nation, serving in its Human Resources and Finance committees until August 2013. From 2013 to 2016 he served as Staff Director of the New Progressive Party Delegation under Senate Minority Leader Thomas Rivera Schatz.

In 2019 he was appointed Auxiliary Secretary at the Oficina De Gerencia De Permisos, a branch of the Puerto Rico Department of Economic Development and Commerce, in charge of issuing business permits, which was severely understaffed.

Subsequently, he served as regional office director and chief of staff to Rivera-Schatz during his second term as Senate President until he was sworn in as Mayor of Camuy on March 13, 2020. The previous mayor, Edwin García, was appointed Puerto Rico Ombudsman, and therefore resigned as mayor of Camuy. Hernández had already been selected as his party's candidate for mayor in the 2020 general elections and was certified unanimously to fill the mayoral vacancy. In the November 2020 general election, he was Camuy's top vote-getter, obtaining 57.13% of the mayoral vote and outpolling his party's gubernatorial candidate, Pedro Pierluisi, who obtained 39.43% in Camuy and went on to become Governor, and his party's congressional candidate, incumbent Jenniffer González, who polled 48.12% of the vote in Camuy, and went on to become the top vote-getter islandwide.

On December 16, 2021, he was sworn in as President of the Puerto Rico Mayors Federation, which represents mayors elected by the New Progressive Party. He is also a member of the board of the Socio-Economic Community Institute, a non-profit devoted to helping low-income communities in Puerto Rico.
