= William Rosales =

Puerto Rican politician

Mayor of Camuy
- In office January 1989 – October 12, 2002
- Succeeded by: Edwin García Feliciano

Personal details
- Born: June 16, 1954 Camuy, Puerto Rico
- Died: December 22, 2013 (aged 59) Bayamón, Puerto Rico
- Party: New Progressive Party (PNP)

William Rosales Pérez (born on June 16, 1954 - died December 22, 2013) was a Puerto Rican politician who served as mayor of Camuy from January 1989 to October 2002. Elected in 1988, when his New Progressive Party (NPP) lost most races, Rosales served as mayor of Camuy for 14 years before resigning in October 2002. At that time, he accepted NPP President Carlos Pesquera's offer to serve as Secretary General of the party. He was succeeded by vice-mayor Edwin García, who has served since after being reelected in his own right in 2004, 2008 and 2012.

Rosales died in Bayamón of pulmonary complications and kidney failure. At the time of his death, he served as Special Assistant to Guaynabo mayor Héctor O'Neill. Rosales was married and had four children: Harold, Wilson, Isis, and William Xavier.
