= María Libertad Gómez Garriga =

Puerto Rican educator and politician

15th Speaker of the Puerto Rico House of Representatives
- In office 1945–1945

Speaker pro tempore of the House of Representatives of Puerto Rico
- In office 1953–1956

Personal details
- Born: July 18, 1889 Utuado, Puerto Rico
- Died: July 7, 1961 (aged 71) San Juan, Puerto Rico
- Party: Liberal Party
- Education: University of Puerto Rico
- Occupation: Educator, civic leader and politician
- Known for: She was the only woman in the Constitutional Convention of Puerto Rico, formed in 1951, and the only woman to sign the 1952 Constitution of Puerto Rico.

María Libertad Gómez Garriga (July 18, 1889 – July 7, 1961) was a Puerto Rican educator, community leader, and politician. She is one of the twelve women honored with a plaque in "La Plaza en Honor a la Mujer Puertorriqueña" (Plaza in Honor of Puerto Rican Women), in San Juan.

== Early life ==
María Libertad Gómez Garriga was born in Arenas barrio of mountainous Utuado, the daughter of Francisco Esteban Gómez and Maria Jesusa Garriga. Francisco Esteban Gómez's grandfather Germán and great-grandmother Gregoria were born in slavery. She completed teacher training at the University of Puerto Rico in 1909.

== Career ==
Gómez Garriga taught elementary school for several years; she was also trained as an accountant and active in rural labor organizations. She was director of a tobacco cooperative; in 1929, she and other activists founded a bank for women. In 1932, she was elected to a leadership position on the Puerto Rican Liberal Party, but soon her wing of the party split off to become the Popular Democratic Party (PPD). After several years working in politics, she was elected to the Puerto Rican House of Representatives in 1940, representing the district of Utuado. She worked particularly on education issues and civil rights, and was pro-independence. For one month in 1945, during a time of transition, she was President of the House, the first woman to hold that position. She was re-elected to her seat three times, and won her last election to the House of Representatives in 1952. She was the only woman in the Constitutional Convention of Puerto Rico, formed in 1951, and the only woman to sign the 1952 Constitution.

She ran unsuccessfully for the Senate of Puerto Rico in 1956 and resigned her positions in the Popular Democratic party after that.

== Personal life and legacy ==
Gómez Garriga died in 1961, aged 72 years. She is one of the twelve women honored with a plaque in the "Plaza en Honor a la Mujer Puertorriqueña" (Plaza in Honor of Puerto Rican Women) in San Juan. There is a public upper elementary school named for María Libertad Gómez Garriga in Utuado. There is also a middle school named for Gómez, in Toa Baja, Puerto Rico.

== See also ==
- List of Puerto Ricans
- History of women in Puerto Rico

== Notes ==
House of Representatives of Puerto Rico
Preceded by Benjamín Ortiz Ortiz	Speaker pro tempore of the Puerto Rico House of Representatives; 1953–1956	Succeeded by Jorge Font Saldaña
Political offices
Preceded by Rafael Rodríguez Pacheco	Speaker of the Puerto Rico House of Representatives; 1945–1945	Succeeded by Francisco M. Susoni Abreu
