= Tatito Hernández =

Puerto Rican politician

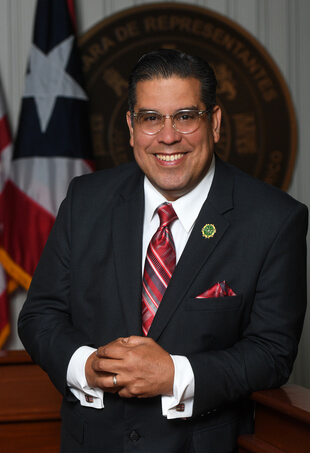

32nd Speaker of the Puerto Rico House of Representatives
- In office January 2, 2021 – January 2, 2025
- Preceded by: Carlos Johnny Méndez
- Succeeded by: Carlos Johnny Méndez

Minority Leader of the Puerto Rico House of Representatives
- In office January 2, 2017 – January 2, 2021
- Preceded by: Jenniffer González
- Succeeded by: Carlos Johnny Méndez

Member of the Puerto Rico House of Representatives from the 11th district
- In office January 2, 2009 – December 31, 2024
- Preceded by: María Vega Pagán
- Succeeded by: Elinette González Aguayo

Member of the Puerto Rico House of Representatives from the at-large district
- In office 2009–2013

Personal details
- Born: Rafael Hernández Montañez; April 14, 1972 (age 54) Dorado, Puerto Rico, U.S.
- Party: Popular Democratic
- Other political affiliations: Democratic
- Education: Polytechnic University of Puerto Rico (BS); Interamerican University of Puerto Rico School of Law (JD)

Military service
- Allegiance: United States
- Branch/service: United States Navy
- Years of service: 1990–1998
- Unit: United States Navy Reserve

Rafael "Tatito" Hernández Montañez (born April 14, 1972) is a Puerto Rican politician affiliated with the Popular Democratic Party (PPD). He is also a Democrat. He has been a member of the Puerto Rico House of Representatives since 2009, representing District 11, which includes the town of Dorado and parts of the towns of Vega Alta and Vega Baja. In the 2020 elections he was re-elected and chosen as speaker of the house in 2021.

== Early life and education ==
Rafael "Tatito" Hernández was born April 14, 1972, in Dorado. Graduated from the José S. Alegría High School in Dorado. He received a Bachelor of Science in Surveying and Cartography from the Polytechnic University of Puerto Rico in San Juan, Puerto Rico and completed a Juris doctor at the Interamerican University of Puerto Rico School of Law. Hernandez also attended the Mortgage Bankers School of Puerto Rico and the Alberto Hernandez Real Estate School, where he took several courses on the origin, processes and analyses of loans, mortgages, and real estate. He served in the United States Navy Reserve for eight years.

== Political career ==
He first ran for a seat in Puerto Rico's House of Representatives as a member of the Popular Democratic Party in 2008, the year of the opposing New Progressive Party's largest landslide election in history. Even though he was not elected as a district representative, the State Elections Commission certified him as an add-on at-large representative under the provisions of the Puerto Rico Constitution that provide for the certification of add-on legislators when the minority falls short in electing 17 members of the House. Once certified, he enjoyed all the privileges of an elected At-Large representative during that term.

In 2012, the Popular Democratic Party renominated Hernández for the general election and was elected outright as District 11's representative, winning with 48.83% of the votes in a three-way race.

In 2016 Hernández was chosen as leader of the PPD minority.

In December 2019, Tatito Hernández endorsed former Vice President and 2020 Democratic presidential nominee Joe Biden and has served as co-chair on his 2020 presidential campaign's "Puerto Rico for Biden" leadership committee. After being chosen as speaker of the House, Hernández hired a former member of the Biden committee as an advisor receiving a $9000 monthly salary.

House of Representatives of Puerto Rico
Preceded by María Vega Pagán	Member of the Puerto Rico House of Representatives from the 11th district 2013–2024	Succeeded by Elinette González Aguayo
Preceded by Jenniffer González	Minority Leader of the Puerto Rico House of Representatives; 2017–2021	Succeeded by Carlos Johnny Méndez
Political offices
Preceded by Carlos Johnny Méndez	Speaker of the House of Representatives of Puerto Rico; 2021–2025	Succeeded by Carlos Johnny Méndez
