= Angel Matos García =

Puerto Rican politician

Ángel Matos García
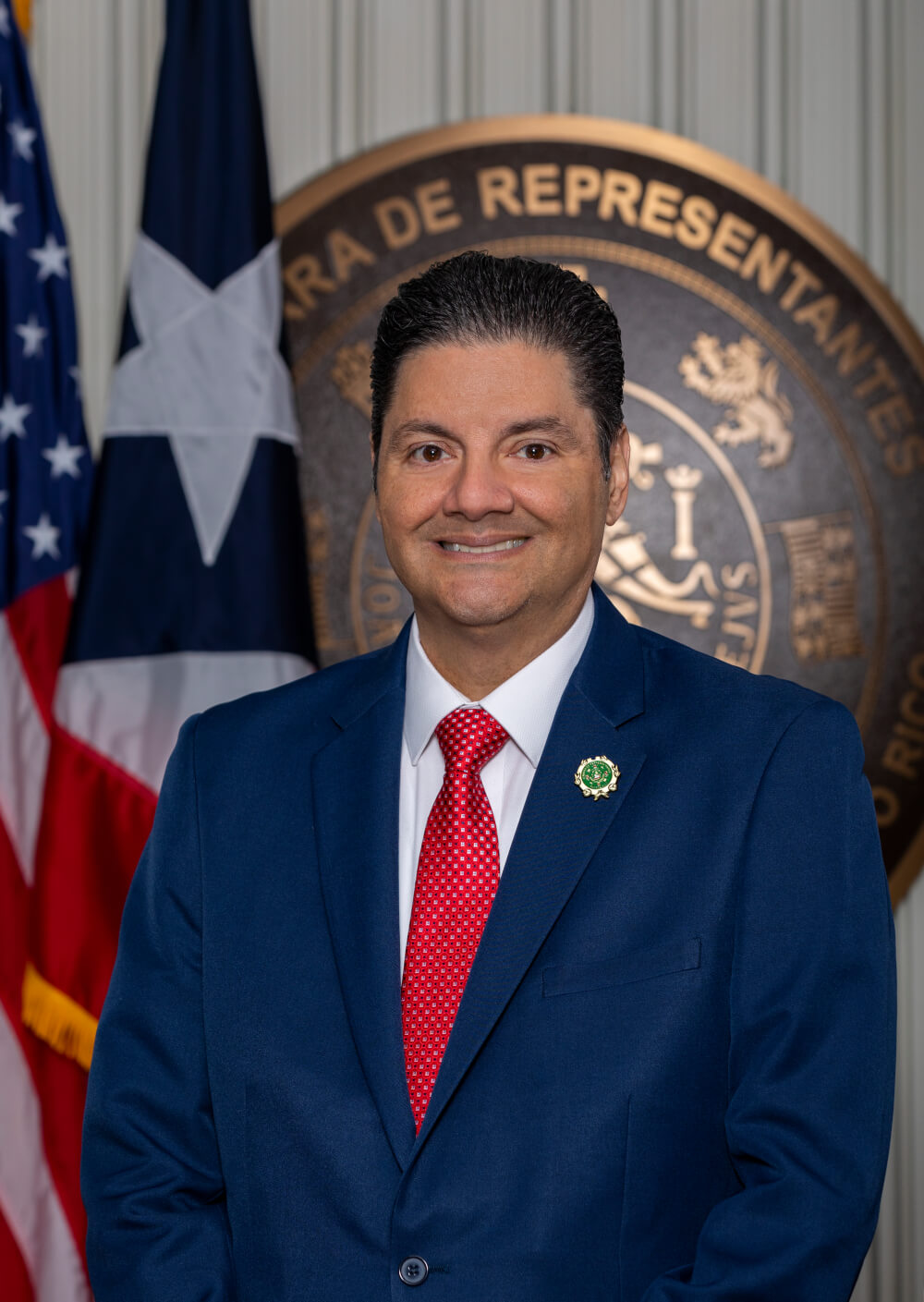

Majority Leader of the Puerto Rico House of Representatives
- In office January 2, 2021 – January 2, 2025
- Preceded by: Gabriel Rodríguez Aguiló
- Succeeded by: José Pichy Torres Zamora

Member of the Puerto Rico House of Representatives from the 40th district
- In office January 2, 2013 – December 31, 2024
- Preceded by: Elizabeth Casado
- Succeeded by: Sergio Estévez

Personal details
- Born: April 19 San Juan, Puerto Rico
- Party: Popular Democratic
- Other political affiliations: Democratic
- Education: Interamerican University of Puerto Rico (BBA)

Ángel Matos García is a Puerto Rican politician affiliated with the Popular Democratic Party (PPD). He was elected to the Puerto Rico House of Representatives in 2012 to represent District 40.

He has a Bachelor of business administration of the Interamerican University of Puerto Rico. He made his practice in advertising at the technological Institute of higher education TEC in Monterrey, Mexico and the Center Euro Latin American youth in Mollina Malaga in Spain.

House of Representatives of Puerto Rico
Preceded by Elizabeth Casado	Member of the Puerto Rico House of Representatives from the 40th district 2012–2024	Succeeded by Sergio Estévez
Preceded by Gabriel Rodríguez Aguiló	Majority Leader of the Puerto Rico House of Representatives; 2021–2024	Succeeded by José Pichy Torres Zamora
