= Carlos Johnny Méndez =

Puerto Rican politician (born 1960)

Johnny Méndez
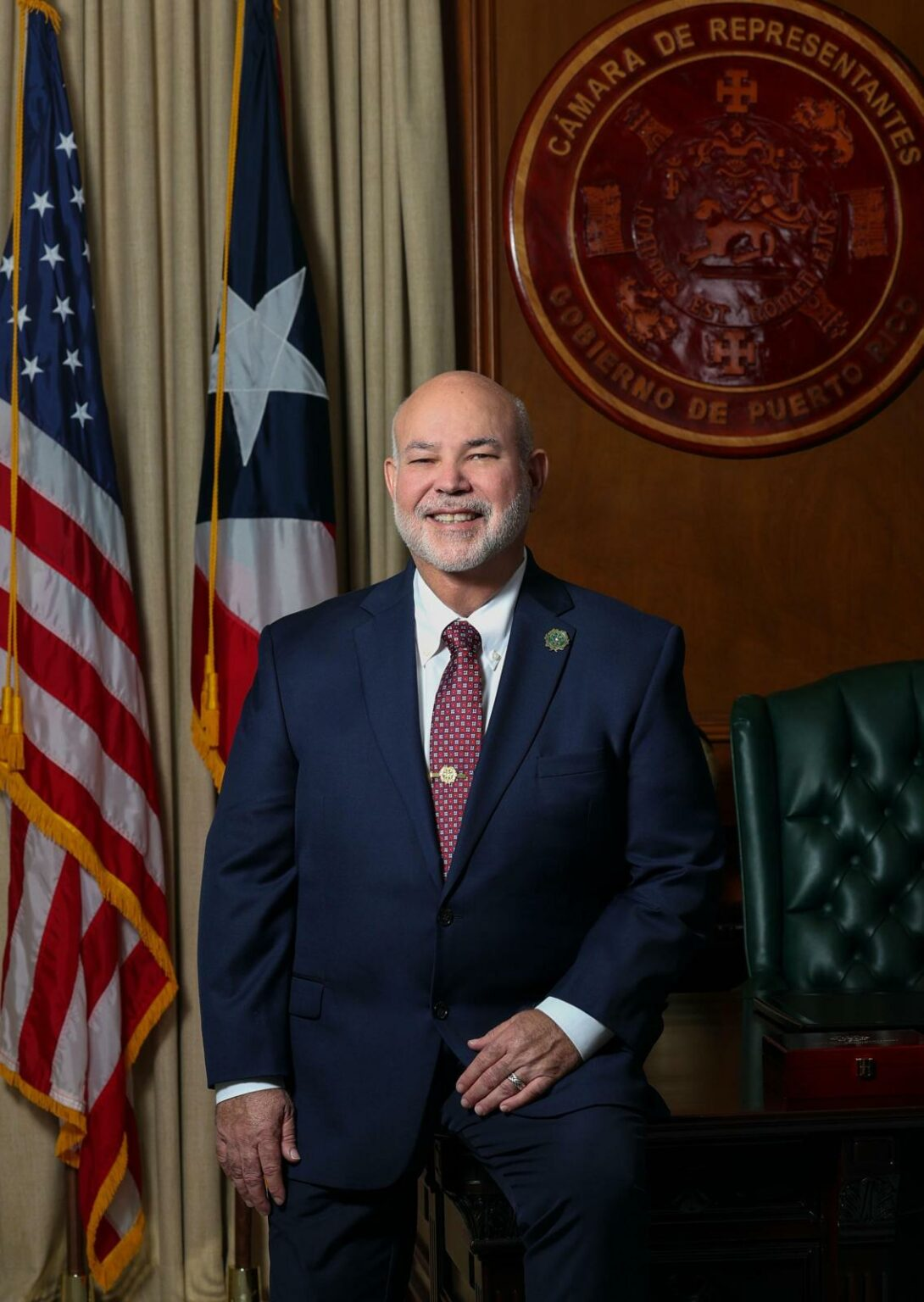
- Méndez Núñez in 2025

Speaker of the Puerto Rico House of Representatives
- Incumbent
- Assumed office January 2, 2025
- Preceded by: Tatito Hernández
- In office January 9, 2017 – January 2, 2021
- Preceded by: Roberto Rivera Ruiz de Porras
- Succeeded by: Tatito Hernández

Minority Leader of the Puerto Rico House of Representatives
- In office January 2, 2021 – January 2, 2025
- Preceded by: Tatito Hernández
- Succeeded by: Héctor Ferrer Santiago

Majority Leader of the Puerto Rico House of Representatives
- In office February 25, 2011 – January 1, 2013
- Preceded by: Rolando Crespo
- Succeeded by: Charlie Hernández

Member of the Puerto Rico House of Representatives from the 36th district
- Incumbent
- Assumed office January 1, 2005
- Preceded by: Jorge Fuentes Matta

Personal details
- Born: June 30, 1960 (age 65) Fajardo, Puerto Rico
- Party: New Progressive
- Other political affiliations: Republican
- Education: University of Puerto Rico, Río Piedras (BA); Interamerican University of Puerto Rico (JD)

Carlos "Johnny" Méndez Núñez (born June 30, 1960) is a politician from Fajardo, Puerto Rico. He represents District 36 in the Puerto Rico House of Representatives and assumed the role of Majority Leader until January 2013 upon the resignation of Rolando Crespo as a member of the House in February, 2011.

Méndez is a supporter of statehood for Puerto Rico and is affiliated with the New Progressive Party (PNP).

Méndez, who studied law and resides in Fajardo, Puerto Rico, simultaneously chairs the Government Committee of the House. He is a member of the National Conference of State Legislatures and the National Hispanic Caucus of State Legislators.

== Early life and education ==
Carlos "Johnny" Méndez Nuñez was born and raised in Fajardo. In 1978 he graduated with honors from the Santiago Veve Calzada High School.

After graduating, Méndez was admitted to the University of Puerto Rico at Río Piedras where he completed a Bachelor's degree with a major in Labor Relations and a minor in Business Administration. He graduated in 1982, and continued studies in Law at the Interamerican University of Puerto Rico School of Law. He received his Juris doctor in 1986.

== Public service ==
Méndez began working in 1986 for the Municipality of San Juan, specifically for the Training and Employment Program, where he was in charge of writing service contracts, as well as the supervision of them. In 1987, he went to work for the Legal Division of the Medical Services Administration of Puerto Rico.

In 1989, Méndez was recruited by his sister's [Diana Méndez] husband, the Mayor of Fajardo, Aníbal Meléndez Rivera, to work as Director of the Office of Federal Affairs. After that, he occupied several positions within the City Administration.

Served as the Executive director of the Northeast Consortium (Consorcio Del Noreste) from 1997 to 2004.

== Political career ==
Méndez was first elected to the House of Representatives of Puerto Rico at the 2004 general election. During his first term, he served as President of the Commission of Employment and Labor Relations. He also served as Vicepresident of the Commissions of Law, Municipal Affairs, and others.

After being reelected in 2008, Méndez was appointed as President of the Government Commission. On February 25, 2011, he was elected by his colleagues as Majority Leader, filling the vacancy left by Rolando Crespo.

Méndez was reelected for a third term at the 2012 general election. Méndez was reelected for a fourth term at the 2016 general election and served as the 31st Speaker of the House. In 2020 he was elected to a fifth term in the House, although his party lost their majority and he relinquished the Speakership. He currently serves as Minority Leader of the House.

House of Representatives of Puerto Rico
Preceded by Jorge Fuentes Matta	Member of the Puerto Rico House of Representatives from the 36th district 2005–present	Incumbent
Preceded by Rolando Crespo	Majority Leader of the Puerto Rico House of Representatives; 2011–2013	Succeeded by Charlie Hernández
Preceded by Tatito Hernández	Minority Leader of the Puerto Rico House of Representatives; 2021–2025	Succeeded by Héctor Ferrer Santiago
Political offices
Preceded by Roberto Rivera Ruiz de Porras; Acting	Speaker of the House of Representatives of Puerto Rico; 2017–2021	Succeeded by Tatito Hernández
Preceded by Tatito Hernández	Speaker of the House of Representatives of Puerto Rico; 2025–present	Incumbent
