= Jorge Ramos Peña =

Puerto Rican politician

Jorge Luis "Borgie" Ramos Peña

Member of the Puerto Rico House of Representatives from the 30th District
- In office January 2, 2005 – January 1, 2013
- Preceded by: Guillermo Valero
- Succeeded by: Luis Ortíz Lugo

Member of the Municipal Assembly of Arroyo
- In office January 2, 1993 – January 1, 2005

Personal details
- Born: September 22, 1961 (age 64) Ponce, Puerto Rico
- Party: New Progressive Party (PNP)
- Children: Luis Aneudy; Anette Marie
- Profession: Firefighter, politician

Jorge Luis "Borgie" Ramos Peña (born September 22, 1961) is a Puerto Rican politician affiliated with the New Progressive Party (PNP). He was a member of the Puerto Rico House of Representatives from 2005 to 2013 representing District 30.

== Early years and studies ==
Jorge Luis Ramos Peña was born on September 22, 1961, in Ponce, Puerto Rico to Pablo Ramos Sanabria and Dora H. Peña Morales. Ramos has three brothers and three sisters. Ramos began studying at the Jesús María Rodríguez School. He then studied mechanics at the Carmen B. Huyke High School.

== Professional career ==
At the age of 19, Ramos began working for the Puerto Rico Firefighters Corps where he held the ranks of firefighter, inspector, Sergeant, Lieutenant, and Captain.

== Political career ==
Ramos began his political career in 1992 when he was elected to the Municipal Assembly of Arroyo. He served as such until 2004, during which he also served as Vicepresident of the New Progressive Party in the town.

In 2003, Ramos presented his candidacy to the House of Representatives of Puerto Rico for District 30. After securing a spot at the PNP primaries, he went on to be elected at the 2004 general election. Ramos was reelected in 2008.

In 2012, Ramos was defeated by Luis Ortíz Lugo.

== Personal life ==
Ramos is married and has two children: Luis Aneudy and Anette Marie.
