= 2016 Popular Democratic Party of Puerto Rico primaries =

Popular Democratic Party primaries, 2016
- June 5, 2016

The 2016 Popular Democratic Party primaries was the primary elections by which voters of the Popular Democratic Party (PPD) chose its nominees for various political offices of Puerto Rico for the 2016 general elections. They were held on June 5, 2016, and also coincided with the Democratic Party primaries in the island.

== Candidates ==
=== Governor ===
Incumbent Governor Alejandro García Padilla announced in December 2015 that he will not run for reelection. His former Secretary of State, David Bernier, announced soon after his candidacy for governor.

=== Resident Commissioner ===
- Héctor Ferrer, former House Representative and President of the Popular Democratic Party of Puerto Rico
- Ángel Rosa, incumbent Senator

=== Senate ===
==== At-large ====
- José Aponte Carro
- Wanda Arroyo
- Eduardo Bhatia
- Antonio Fas Alzamora
- Luisa Gándara
- Rossana López León
- José Nadal Power
- Miguel Pereira Castillo
- Cirilo Tirado Rivera
- Aníbal José Torres

=== House of Representatives ===
==== At-large ====
- Jorge Colberg Toro
- Ulises Dalmau
- Brenda López de Arrarás
- Cristofer Malespín
- Manuel Natal Albelo
- Jesús Manuel Ortíz
- Mario Pabón
- Jaime Perelló
- Gil A. Rodríguez
- Yaramary Torres
- Luis Vega Ramos
- Eluis Vick
- Roberto Vigoreaux

== Results ==
=== Resident Commissioner ===
Candidate	Popular vote	Percentage
Héctor Ferrer	91,798	57.68%
Ángel Rosa	67,356	42.32%

=== Senate ===
==== At-large ====
Candidate	Popular vote	Percentage
Aníbal José Torres	123,080	15.16%
Rossana López	117,162	14.43
Eduardo Bhatia	110,997	13.67
José Nadal Power	99,180	12.22
Miguel Pereira Castillo	96,777	11.92
Cirilo Tirado	89,842	11.07
Luisa Gándara	86,557	10.66
José Aponte Carro	49,240	6.07
Wanda Arroyo	38,916	4.79

== See also ==
- New Progressive Party of Puerto Rico primaries, 2016
