= Edwin García Feliciano =

Puerto Rican politician (born 1960)

Puerto Rico Ombudsman
- Incumbent
- Assumed office 2020
- Preceded by: Iris Miriam Ruíz

Mayor of Camuy
- In office October 12, 2002 - March 28, 2020
- Preceded by: William Rosales
- Succeeded by: Gabriel Hernández-Rodríguez

Personal details
- Born: April 8, 1960 (age 66) Camuy, Puerto Rico
- Party: New Progressive Party
- Education: University of Puerto Rico (BA); University of Puerto Rico School of Law (JD)

Edwin García Feliciano (born April 8, 1960) is a Puerto Rican politician and was mayor of Camuy until 2020. García is affiliated with the New Progressive Party (PNP) and has served as mayor since 2002. In 1984 obtained a bachelor's degree in arts with a focus on Political Science at the University of Puerto Rico. Has a juris doctor from the University of Puerto Rico School of Law. In 2020 Puerto Rico governor Wanda Vázquez Garced submitted the nomination of Edwin Garcia Feliciano as the Puerto Rico Ombudsman.
