= Alfonso Lastra Chárriez =

Puerto Rican politician and lawyer

Speaker pro tempore of the House of Representatives of Puerto Rico
- In office 1921–1924

Member of the Puerto Rico House of Representatives from at-large district
- In office 1921–1924

Member of the Puerto Rico House of Representatives from the 21st District
- In office 1917–1920

Member of the Puerto Rico Senate from at-large district
- In office 1937–1940

Personal details
- Born: October 4, 1887 Yabucoa, Puerto Rico
- Died: December 3, 1946 (aged 59) San Juan, Puerto Rico
- Party: Liberal Party of Puerto Rico
- Education: Northern Illinois University College of Law (JD)
- Occupation: Politician
- Profession: Lawyer

Alfonso Lastra Chárriez (October 4, 1887 - December 3, 1946) was a Puerto Rican lawyer and politician from the Liberal Party of Puerto Rico.

== Early years ==
Was born in the year 1887 in Yabucoa, Puerto Rico to Juan Lastra and Alfonsina Charriez. Alfonso Lastra Chárriez was a lawyer before becoming a politician.

== Politics ==
Alfonso Lastra Chárriez was a member of the Liberal Party of Puerto Rico. Got elected to the Puerto Rico House of Representatives that included a term as Speaker pro tempore of the House of Representatives of Puerto Rico from 1921 to 1924. In 1937 was elected as an at-large member for the Puerto Rico Senate.

== Legacy ==
Was a prominent member of the Liberal Party of Puerto Rico. He died in 1946 at age 59 in San Juan, Puerto Rico and was buried at the Puerto Rico Memorial Cemetery in Carolina, Puerto Rico.

House of Representatives of Puerto Rico
Preceded by Miguel Guerra Mondragón	Speaker pro tempore of the Puerto Rico House of Representatives; 1921–1924	Succeeded by Miguel Guerra Mondragón
Senate of Puerto Rico
Preceded by Antonio R. Barceló	Minority Leader of the Puerto Rico Senate; 1937–1939	Succeeded by José Ramírez Santibanez
