= Elizabeth Casado =

Puerto Rican politician (born 1965)

Elizabeth Casado Irizarry

Member of the Puerto Rico House of Representatives from the 40th District
- In office January 2, 2009 – January 1, 2013
- Preceded by: Epifanio Jiménez
- Succeeded by: Angel Matos García

Personal details
- Born: August 29, 1965 (age 61) Brooklyn, New York
- Party: New Progressive Party (PNP)
- Spouse: Pedro Benítez Rodríguez (divorced)
- Education: University of Puerto Rico (BA); Interamerican University of Puerto Rico School of Law (JD)
- Profession: Lawyer

Elizabeth Casado Irizarry (born August 29, 1965) is a Puerto Rican politician affiliated with the New Progressive Party (PNP). She was a member of the Puerto Rico House of Representatives from 2009 to 2013 representing District 40.

== Early years and studies ==
Irizarry was born on August 29, 1965, in Brooklyn, New York. At the age of 2, her parents brought her to live in Carolina.

Casado studied at the University of Puerto Rico at Río Piedras, where she completed a bachelor's degree in marketing. She also studied piano at the Conservatory of Music of Puerto Rico.

In 1997, Casado completed a Juris Doctor at the Interamerican University of Puerto Rico School of Law, graduating Cum laude.

== Professional career ==
After graduating, Casado practiced law, specializing in the citizens of Carolina, where she had her offices.

== Political career ==
Casado was first elected to the House of Representatives of Puerto Rico at the 2008 general election. She was elected to represent District 40. After one term, Casado wasn't reelected in 2012.

After losing her reelection bid, Governor Luis Fortuño appointed Casado to be District Attorney. Her appointment was confirmed by the Senate of Puerto Rico on December 20, 2012.

== Personal life ==
Casado was married to Pedro Benítez Rodríguez. They divorced in 2006 after 13 years of relationship. According to Casado, she was victim of domestic abuse.
