= Enrique Landrón Otero =

Puerto Rican politician (1878–1935)

Member of the Puerto Rico House of Representatives from the 5th District Corozal
- In office 1928–1930

Speaker pro tempore of the House of Representatives of Puerto Rico
- In office 1930–1930
- Preceded by: Benigno Fernández García
- Succeeded by: Rafael Alonso Torres

Personal details
- Born: May 22, 1878 Vega Baja, Puerto Rico
- Died: March 30, 1935 (aged 56) San Juan, Puerto Rico
- Party: Union of Puerto Rico

Enrique Landrón Otero (22 May 1878 – 30 March 1935) was born in Vega Baja, Puerto Rico, Spanish Empire. He was elected to the Puerto Rico House of Representatives on November 6, 1928, for the District No. 5 of Corozal, Puerto Rico. He was affiliated to the Union Party of Puerto Rico and the Puerto Rican Alliance Party. He chaired the Finance Committee of the House of Representatives and was Vice-Presidente of the House in 1930. He was instrumental in the creation of the Puerto Rico Bar Association.

Enrique Landrón Otero was a civic and political leader in Arecibo and Corozal, having served as administrator of the Central Cambalache in Arecibo and owning a pineapple farm in Corozal. He was co-founder of the Farmers Association of Puerto Rico, serving as spokesman in Washington for the Puerto Rican farmers. Died on March 30, 1935. He was buried at the Corozal Municipal Cemetery in Corozal, Puerto Rico. At his burial, Don Antonio R. Barceló gave his eulogy.

House of Representatives of Puerto Rico
Preceded by Benigno Fernández García	Speaker pro tempore of the Puerto Rico House of Representatives; 1930–1930	Succeeded by Rafael Alonso Torres
