= Ernesto Ramos Antonini =

Puerto Rican politician (1898–1963)

17th Speaker of the House of Representatives of Puerto Rico
- In office January 2, 1948 – January 9, 1963
- Preceded by: Francisco M. Susoni Abreu
- Succeeded by: Santiago Polanco Abreu

Speaker pro tempore of the House of Representatives of Puerto Rico
- In office January 2, 1945 – January 9, 1948
- Preceded by: Guillermo Alicea Campos
- Succeeded by: Benjamín Ortiz Ortiz

Member of the Puerto Rico House of Representatives from the at-large district
- In office January 2, 1941 – January 9, 1963

Personal details
- Born: April 28, 1898 Mayagüez, Puerto Rico
- Died: January 9, 1963 (aged 64) Santurce, Puerto Rico
- Resting place: Puerto Rico Memorial Cemetery in Carolina, Puerto Rico
- Spouse: Josefina Buonomo
- Children: Jeannette and Ivette
- Education: University of Puerto Rico School of Law (JD)
- Occupation: lawyer, President of the House of Representatives of Puerto Rico
- Ramos Antonini was co-founder of the Partido Popular Democrático de Puerto Rico (Popular Democratic Party of Puerto Rico). Together with Dr. Ricardo Alegría, he founded the Institute of Puerto Rican Culture.

Ernesto Ramos Antonini (April 24, 1898 – January 9, 1963) was the President of the House of Representatives of Puerto Rico and co-founder of the Partido Popular Democrático de Puerto Rico (Popular Democratic Party of Puerto Rico).

== Early years ==
Ramos Antonini was born into a poor family in Mayagüez, Puerto Rico. He was the youngest child of the marriage between Federico Ramos Escalera and Rosa Antonini Danseau. When he was three months old, the family moved to Ponce, Puerto Rico, where he spent the next 43 years of his life. As a child, his parents taught him the importance of getting a good education. During the day, he dedicated himself to his school studies, and, during his free time, he was taught how to play the piano by his father, who happened to be a musician. He graduated from Ponce High School in 1918, at 19 years of age. After he graduated from high school, Ramos Antonini enrolled at the University of Puerto Rico in Río Piedras (which is now a part of San Juan) to study law. He paid for his school tuition by playing piano at a local theatre and, in 1922, earned his law degree. He returned to Ponce where he taught math, became president of the Ponce Municipal Assembly and established his law firm.

In 1937, he gained fame as a lawyer when he defended the members of the Puerto Rican Nationalist Party who were accused of breaking the law after permits issued by the Mayor of Ponce for a peaceful march in Ponce were withdrawn by the colonial governor of Puerto Rico at the time, General Blanton Winship. Upon the withdrawal of the permits, the police opened fire on the crowd in what became known as the Ponce massacre. He also became known as a defender of the working class by being active in the International Workers Congress. He appeared before the U.S. Congress and defended the Puerto Rican workers who were being abused by the American companies established on the island.

== Political career ==
In 1924, Ramos Antonini joined the Union Party of Puerto Rico founded by Luis Muñoz Rivera, Rosendo Matienzo Cintrón, Antonio R. Barceló and José de Diego in 1904, which defended self-government (autonomy) at the time of his entrance to the party. In 1930, Ramos Antonini, along with Luis Muñoz Marín joined the Liberal Party of Puerto Rico, successor of the Union Party, but now defending the independence of Puerto Rico. In 1932, he was elected to the House of Representatives along with Muñoz Marín to the Senate.

In 1938, Ramos Antonini became one of the co-founders of the Popular Democratic Party of Puerto Rico and was elected to the House of Representatives as a member of that political organization in the 1940s general elections. In 1940 he lived at Calle Isabel #31 in Ponce. His wife was Josefina Buonomo. They later moved to today's Urbanización Floral Park in Hato Rey, a barrio of Río Piedras, which was still a town independent from San Juan. Their daughters names were Jannette and Ivette.

In 1945, he was named President of the House of Representatives, a position which he held until his death in 1963. Ernesto Ramos Antonini was buried at the Puerto Rico Memorial Cemetery in Carolina, Puerto Rico.

== Laws created by Ramos Antonini ==
Among the many laws created by Ramos Antonini were the following:

- The law that created the Institute of Labor Relations
- The law that created the National Commission of Work Relations
- The Minimum Wage Law of 1956
- The creation of the Escuela Libre de Música (music schools) of San Juan, Ponce, and Mayagüez
- The creation of the Symphonic Orchestra of Puerto Rico
- The law creating the Music Conservatory of Puerto Rico

== Later years ==
Ramos Antonini was married to educator Josefina Buonomo. They had two daughters together: Jeannette and Ivette. In 1952 the Constitution of Puerto Rico was adopted, creating the Commonwealth of Puerto Rico. He was a member of the Constitutional Convention of Puerto Rico. Together with Dr. Ricardo Alegría, he founded the Institute of Puerto Rican Culture. Ernesto Ramos Antonini died on January 9, 1963, in San Juan, Puerto Rico. He was buried at the Puerto Rico Memorial Cemetery in Carolina, Puerto Rico.

== Legacy ==
The memory of Ramos Antonini has been honored by the government of Puerto Rico naming an avenue and public structures after him. In Barceloneta, Puerto Rico there is an Ernesto Ramos Antonini theatre and there is a Museum of History located in the Plaza Ernesto Ramos Antonini in Mayagüez. On December 18, 1997, the Government of Puerto Rico approved the Law Number 166 which proclaims every April 24 from then on to be known as "Ernesto Ramos Antonini Day". In Ponce, San Juan, Mayagüez, and Yauco, there are public specialized schools named after him; the Escuela Libre de Música Ernesto Ramos Antonini of San Juan features a life-sized bronze statue of him at its entrance. He is also honored at Ponce's Park of Illustrious Ponce Citizens. The main street in the El Tuque sector of Barrio Canas in Ponce is also named in his memory.

== See also ==
- List of Puerto Ricans
- Corsican immigration to Puerto Rico

House of Representatives of Puerto Rico
Preceded by Guillermo Alicea Campos	Speaker pro tempore of the Puerto Rico House of Representatives; 1945-1948	Succeeded by Benjamín Ortiz Ortiz
Political offices
Preceded by Francisco M. Susoni Abreu	Speaker of the House of Representatives of Puerto Rico; Acting; 1948–1963	Succeeded by Santiago Polanco Abreu
