= Aguedo Mojica =

Puerto Rican politician and lawyer

At-Large Member of the Puerto Rico House of Representatives
- In office 1957–1968

Speaker pro tempore of the House of Representatives of Puerto Rico
- In office 1965–1968

Personal details
- Born: March 16, 1908 Humacao, Puerto Rico
- Died: June 19, 1982 (aged 74) Humacao, Puerto Rico
- Party: Popular Democratic Party
- Education: University of Puerto Rico (Ph.D); University of Puerto Rico School of Law (JD); Complutense University of Madrid (SJD); Sorbonne University (Ph.D, D.Litt.)
- Occupation: Educator and politician
- Profession: Lawyer

Aguedo Mojica Marrero (March 16, 1908 – June 19, 1981) was a Puerto Rican politician, lawyer and educator. He is noted for his academic work.

== Early years and studies ==
Aguedo Mojica was born on March 16, 1908, in Humacao, Puerto Rico. He studied at the University of Puerto Rico, Río Piedras Campus where he was doctored in philosophy and later in law from the University of Puerto Rico School of Law. He was also a law professor at the same institution. He worked as a professor at the University of Puerto Rico, as a professor of Latin, in 1943, and thereafter taught philosophical chair. He earned a Doctor degree in Law philosophy from the Complutense University of Madrid and another Doctor degree in Philosophy and Letters from Paris-Sorbonne University.

== Politics ==
Retired for a few from his academic career to enter politics and took a position as a At-Large member of the Puerto Rico House of Representatives from 1957 to 1968 that included a stint as Speaker pro tempore of the House of Representatives of Puerto Rico from 1965 to 1968.

== Personal life and legacy ==
Aguedo Mojica died on June 19, 1982. Had many awards and recognitions for his academic career. The library at the University of Puerto Rico at Humacao was named after Aguedo Mojica for one of the legislators of the law that created the regional colleges of the University of Puerto Rico. The center of fine arts in Humacao was also named after him.

House of Representatives of Puerto Rico
Preceded by Benjamín Ortiz Ortiz	Speaker pro tempore of the Puerto Rico House of Representatives; 1965–1968	Succeeded by Rubén Otero Bosco
