= José Quiquito Meléndez =

Puerto Rican politician (born 1973)

Quiquito Meléndez
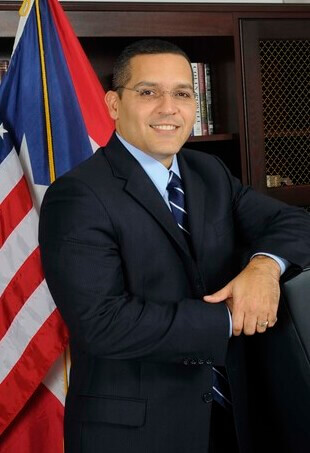

Member of the Puerto Rico House of Representatives from the at-large district
- In office May 23, 2011 – December 31, 2024
- Preceded by: Rolando Crespo

Personal details
- Born: December 5, 1973 (age 52) Aibonito, Puerto Rico
- Party: New Progressive Party (PNP)
- Other political affiliations: Republican
- Spouse: Mariel Pagán Ramos
- Children: 3
- Education: Interamerican University, San Germán (BA); Pontifical Catholic University of Puerto Rico School of Law (JD)

José Enrique "Quiquito" Meléndez Ortiz (born December 5, 1973) is a Puerto Rican politician affiliated with the New Progressive Party (PNP). He has been a member of the Puerto Rico House of Representatives since May 23, 2011. Meléndez is a current candidate for Resident Commissioner in the 2024 Puerto Rican Elections.

== Early years and studies ==
José Enrique Meléndez Ortiz was born on December 5, 1973, in Aibonito, Puerto Rico. His parents are former Senator José Enrique Meléndez Ortiz Sr. and Elba M. Ortiz Santiago.

Meléndez completed his elementary and high school studies in Coamo. He then received a Bachelor's degree in Political Science from the Interamerican University of Puerto Rico. After that, he completed his Juris doctor at the Pontifical Catholic University of Puerto Rico in 2002. After that, he passed the bar exam.

Meléndez served as a regional election coordinator, a regional director, and national committeeman of the Young Republican Federation of Puerto Rico In his youth.

== Professional career ==
In 2002, Meléndez was hired by then-Representative Aníbal Vega Borges to serve as Legislative Adviser to the New Progressive Party at the Puerto Rico House of Representatives. During that time, he also served as adviser to Representatives José Chico Vega and Edwin Mundo Ríos. Also, Thomas Rivera Schatz, then Electoral Commissioner of the PNP, recruited Meléndez as an adviser in electoral affairs. Meléndez continued working for Rivera Schatz becoming his Legal Aide.

From 2003 to 2004, Meléndez also gave legislative and legal advice to Representative José F. Aponte Hernández. On January 10, 2005, Meléndez was appointed unanimously to serve as Secretary of the House of Representatives, under elected Speaker Aponte Hernández. He served in that position until 2006.

Meléndez also works as a private attorney.

== Political career ==
In April 2011, Meléndez Ortiz presented his candidacy to fill the vacant of Rolando Crespo in the House of Representatives. On May 23, 2011, he was sworn into the position. He is currently a member of the Committees of Municipal Affairs, Treasury, Health, Public Safety, and others.

== Personal life ==
Meléndez is married to Mariel Pagán Ramos. They have three children: José Enrique, Enrique José and Enrique André. They live in Guaynabo.
