= Santiago Polanco-Abreu =

Puerto Rican politician (1920–1988)

Santiago Polanco Abreu
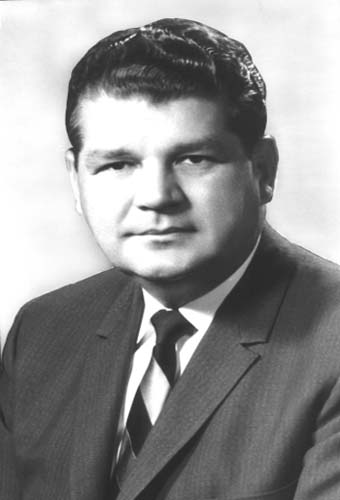

Resident Commissioner of Puerto Rico
- In office January 3, 1965 – January 3, 1969
- Preceded by: Antonio Fernós-Isern
- Succeeded by: Jorge Luis Córdova

Speaker of the House of Representatives of Puerto Rico
- In office January 9, 1963 – January 2, 1965
- Preceded by: Ernesto Ramos Antonini
- Succeeded by: Arcilio Alvarado Alvarado

Personal details
- Born: Santiago Iglesias Pantín; October 30, 1920 Bayamón, Puerto Rico
- Died: January 18, 1988 (aged 67) San Juan, Puerto Rico
- Resting place: Isabela Municipal Cemetery in Isabela, Puerto Rico
- Party: Popular Democratic
- Other political affiliations: Democratic
- Education: University of Puerto Rico, Río Piedras (BA); University of Puerto Rico School of Law (LLB)

Santiago Polanco-Abreu (October 30, 1920 – January 18, 1988) was an American politician who served as the 10th Resident Commissioner of Puerto Rico.

== Biography ==
Born in Bayamón, Puerto Rico, Polanco-Abreu attended elementary and high schools in Isabela, Puerto Rico. He graduated from the University of Puerto Rico, B.A., 1941, and LL.B., 1943. He joined Phi Sigma Alpha fraternity. He was admitted to the bar in 1943 and practiced law in Isabela and San Juan. Legal adviser to the Tax Court of Puerto Rico from 1943 to 1944. He served as member of the American Bar Association and Puerto Rico Bar Association. He was one of the founders of the Institute for Democratic Studies in San José, Costa Rica.

=== Puerto Rico House of Representatives ===
He served in the House of Representatives, Commonwealth of Puerto Rico from 1949 to 1964. He served as member of the Constitutional Convention of Puerto Rico in 1951-1952. He was appointed speaker of the house from 1963 to 1964.

=== Resident Commissioner of Puerto Rico ===
Polanco-Abreu was elected as a Popular Democrat to be Resident Commissioner of Puerto Rico to the United States Congress, November 3, 1964, for the term ending January 3, 1969. He was an unsuccessful candidate for reelection in 1968.

=== Later career and death ===
He resumed the practice of law. He was a resident of San Juan, Puerto Rico, until his death there on January 18, 1988.

He was interred at the Isabela Municipal Cemetery in Isabela, Puerto Rico.

== See also ==
- List of Hispanic Americans in the United States Congress

== Notes ==
Political offices
| Preceded by Ernesto Ramos Antonini | Speaker of the House of Representatives of Puerto Rico; 1963–1965 | Succeeded by Arcilio Alvarado Alvarado |
U.S. House of Representatives
| Preceded by Antonio Fernós-Isern | Resident Commissioner of Puerto Rico; 1965–1969 | Succeeded by Jorge Luis Córdova |
