= Antonio Fernós Isern =

Puerto Rican cardiologist and politician (1895–1974)

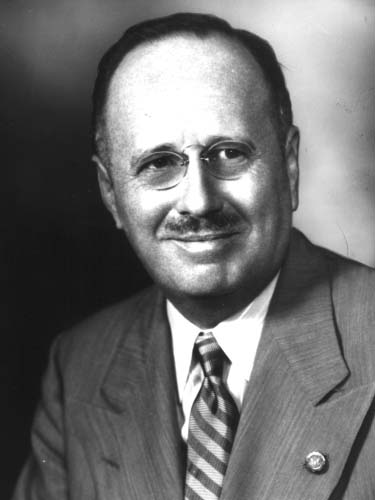

Resident Commissioner of Puerto Rico
- In office September 11, 1946 – January 3, 1965
- Preceded by: Jesús T. Piñero
- Succeeded by: Santiago Polanco Abreu

Member of the Senate of Puerto Rico from At-large district
- In office 1965–1968

Personal details
- Born: May 10, 1895 San Lorenzo, Puerto Rico
- Died: January 19, 1974 (aged 78) San Juan, Puerto Rico
- Resting place: Santa María Magdalena de Pazzis Cemetery
- Party: Popular Democratic
- Other political affiliations: Democratic
- Education: University of Maryland, College Park (MD)

Antonio Fernós Isern (May 10, 1895 – January 19, 1974) was the first Puerto Rican cardiologist and the longest serving Resident Commissioner of Puerto Rico in the United States Congress.

== Early years ==
Fernós Isern was born in San Lorenzo, Puerto Rico, and attended primary and intermediate schools in Caguas. His family moved to Bloomsburg, Pennsylvania, during his mid-year in high school. He finished his high school education in the Pennsylvania State Normal School. After completing his pre-medical training, he applied and was accepted to the College of Physicians and Surgeons of the University of Maryland, College Park and earned his doctor's degree in May 1915.

Fernós Isern returned to the island and settled in the city of Caguas where he practiced medicine for two years. Between the years 1918 and 1933 he held various administrative positions in the health services of Puerto Rico. In 1918, he was the Director for the City of San Juan. From 1919 to 1921, Fernós Isern was the Under-Secretary of Health. From 1921 to 1923, he was the Director of Health in the city. From 1923 to 1929, Fernós Isern was once again Under-Secretary of Health. He was the Secretary of Health from 1930 to 1933.

== First Puerto Rican cardiologist ==
In 1933, Fernós Isern resigned as health commissioner and went to New York City where he completed his residency in cardiology at Columbia University and thus became the first Puerto Rican cardiologist. Upon his later return to Puerto Rico, Fernós Isern became a professor at the Public School of Tropical Medicine of Puerto Rico. He had previously served as both assistant professor and associate professor at this institution.

== Political career ==
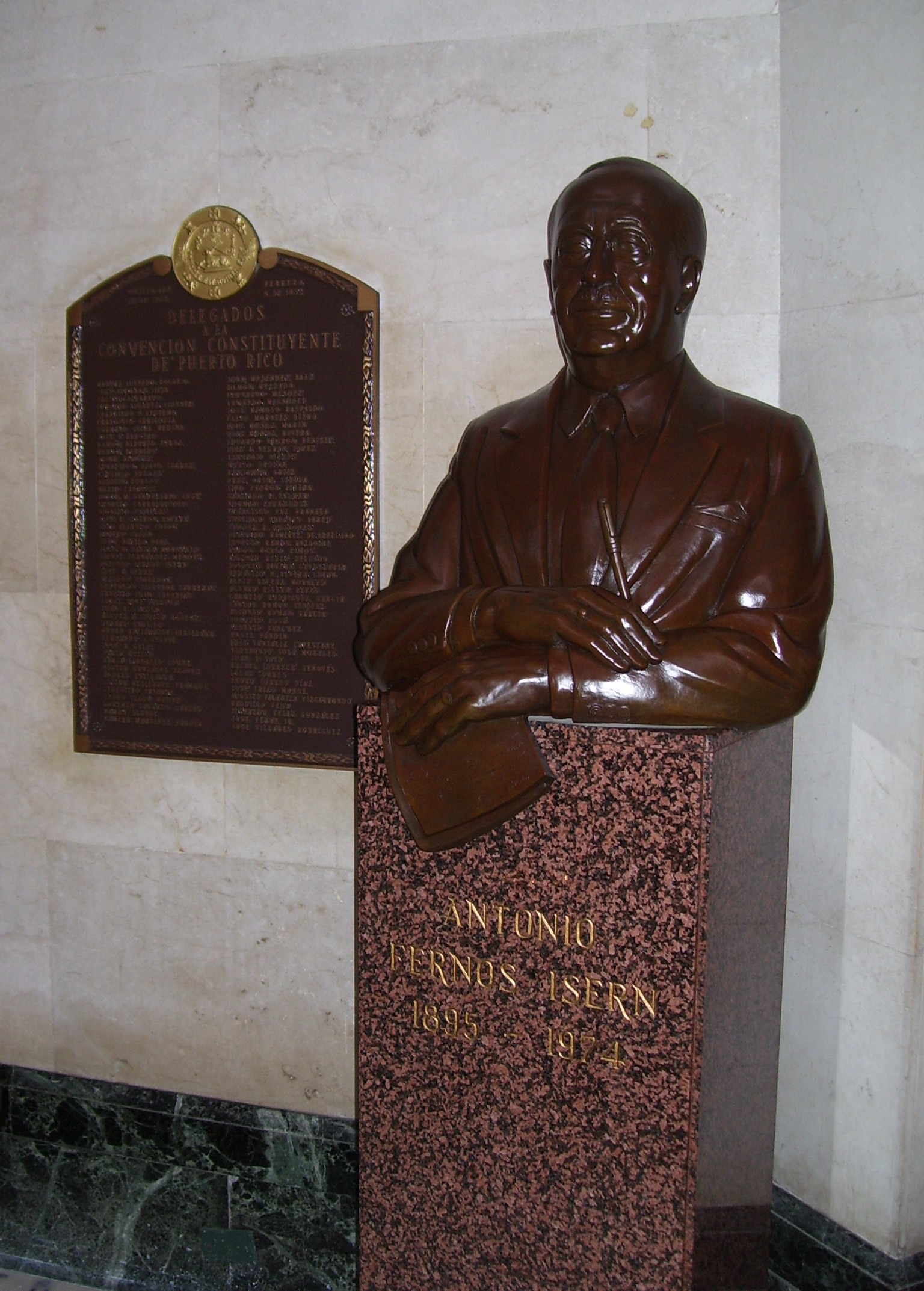
Bust of Fernós Isern at the Capitol of Puerto Rico.

In 1937, Fernós Isern joined Luis Muñoz Marín to organize the Partido Popular Democrático (Popular Democratic Party). In 1941, he served as the Director of Civil Defense for the San Juan Metropolitan Area. In 1942, he returned to head the Department of Health and the Administration of Public Housing, in addition to serving as Director of the War Effort Office for Puerto Rico. From 1943 to 1946, Fernós Isern was also the acting governor of Puerto Rico during the Governorship of Rexford G. Tugwell, under appointment as Permanent Acting Governor approved by President Franklin Delano Roosevelt.

== Resident Commissioner ==
In 1946, Jesús T. Piñero, the first Puerto Rican to serve as governor of Puerto Rico, appointed Fernós Isern as his replacement in the position of Resident Commissioner to the U.S. Congress after unanimous endorsement from the island legislature. Fernós Isern was re-elected on four consecutive occasions, serving a total of nineteen years. As Resident Commissioner, Fernós Isern played a very important role in convincing the Government of the United States to give Puerto Ricans the right to govern their island. In 1947, the Crawford Project, allowing Puerto Ricans to elect their governor, was approved by Congress and signed into law by President Harry S Truman.

On June 8, 1950, the United States Senate approved Public Law 600, permitting Puerto Rico to establish its own constitutional local autonomous government. Fernós Isern served as president of the Constitutional Convention which drafted the Constitution of the Commonwealth (Estado Libre Asociado).

== Later years ==
Fernós Isern did not seek re-election in 1964. He returned to Puerto Rico from Washington, D.C., and was elected to the Puerto Rican Senate, serving between 1965 and 1969. After he retired from politics, Fernós Isern returned to the University of Puerto Rico as Resident Scholar where he wrote a monumental political work, in two parts, i.e., El Estado Libre Asociado (The Commonwealth of Puerto Rico) and Filosofía y Doctrina del Estadolibrismo (Philosophy and Doctrine of the Puerto Rican Commonwealth).

Fernós Isern died in San Juan, Puerto Rico, on January 19, 1974, and was buried with full state honors in the Santa María Magdalena de Pazzis Cemetery located in Old San Juan, Puerto Rico.

== Legacy ==
His memory is honored at the Capitol in San Juan with a bust facing the urn preserving the original Constitution of Puerto Rico. His collected papers are held in trust at the Fernós Isern room at the Inter American University Law School in Hato Rey, San Juan.

== See also ==
- List of Puerto Ricans
- Puerto Rican scientists and inventors
- List of Hispanic Americans in the United States Congress

U.S. House of Representatives
| Preceded by Jesús T. Piñero | Resident Commissioner of Puerto Rico; 1946–1965 | Succeeded by Santiago Polanco Abreu |
