= Puerto Rico Ombudsman =

Government position created in 1977 in Puerto Rico

The Puerto Rico Ombudsman (In Spanish also Procurador(a) del Ciudadano) is a government position created by statute in 1977 during the administration of Governor Carlos Romero Barceló to provide citizens with an office that could receive and investigate complaints regarding the proper functioning of government agencies and the level of service to the public. The Ombudsman is appointed by the Governor of Puerto Rico to a ten-year term and requires the advice and consent of both the Senate and the House of Representatives of Puerto Rico. The Ombudsman's salary is equal to that of a Court of Appeals judge, currently $105,000 per year.

In 2020 Puerto Rico governor Wanda Vázquez Garced nominated Edwin Garcia Feliciano as Ombudsman.

== Puerto Rico Ombudspersons ==
- Rafael Adolfo De Castro
- Carlos López Nieves
- Kevin Miguel Rivera (acting)
- Iris Miriam Ruiz (2010-2020)
- Edwin García Feliciano (2020- )
