= José Pichy Torres Zamora =

Puerto Rican politician

Pichy Torres
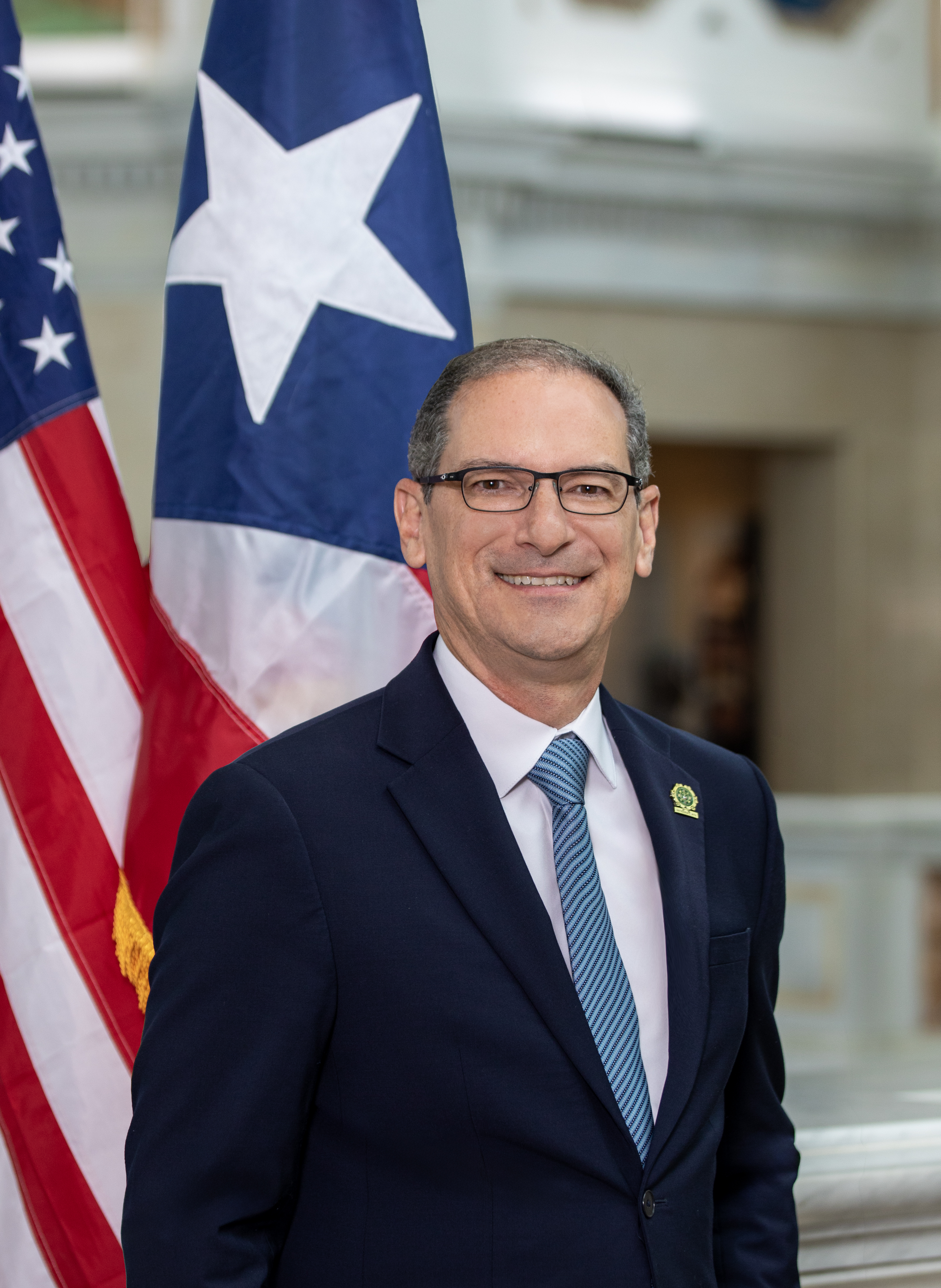

Majority Leader of the Puerto Rico House of Representatives
- Incumbent
- Assumed office January 2, 2025
- Preceded by: Angel Matos García

Speaker pro tempore of the Puerto Rico House of Representatives
- In office January 2, 2018 – January 2, 2021
- Preceded by: María de Lourdes Ramos Rivera (acting)
- Succeeded by: Conny Varela
- In office January 9, 2017 – August 14, 2017
- Preceded by: Roberto Rivera Ruiz de Porras
- Succeeded by: María de Lourdes Ramos Rivera (acting)

Secretary General of the New Progressive Party
- In office December 27, 2012 – December 31, 2013
- Preceded by: Omar Negrón
- Succeeded by: José Aponte Hernández

Member of the Puerto Rico House of Representatives from the at-large district
- Incumbent
- Assumed office January 2, 2017
- In office June 2, 2010 – January 1, 2013
- Preceded by: Iris Miriam Ruíz

Personal details
- Born: José Ernesto Torres Zamora; June 7, 1971 (age 55) Jayuya, Puerto Rico
- Party: New Progressive
- Other political affiliations: Republican
- Children: 2
- Education: University of Puerto Rico, Mayagüez (BS); Polytechnic University of Puerto Rico (MS); University of Puerto Rico School of Law (JD)

José Ernesto "Pichy" Torres Zamora (born June 7, 1971) is a Puerto Rican politician and former Secretary General of the New Progressive Party (PNP). He was a member of the Puerto Rico House of Representatives from June 10, 2010, when he replaced Iris Miriam Ruíz, until 2013. He won a seat in the PR House of Representatives in 2016 and currently he serves as the Speaker Pro Tempore of the Puerto Rico House of Representatives.

== Early years and studies ==
José Ernesto Torres Zamora was born in Jayuya on June 7, 1971, to Monsita Zamora González and Ernesto Torres Torres. He is the oldest of three children. His parents were founders of the New Progressive Party in Jayuya.

Torres Zamora graduated with honors from Josefina León Zayas High School. He was also president of his class in 1988. After that, he studied at the University of Puerto Rico at Mayagüez, where he completed a Bachelor's degree in Chemical Engineering, graduating Cum Laude. Torres Zamora completed post-secondary studies at the Polytechnic University of Puerto Rico where he completed a master's degree on Environmental Management and a master's degree on Engineering Management, graduating with summa cum laude.

Torres Zamora completed a Juris Doctor Degree at the University of Puerto Rico Law School.

== Professional career ==
Torres Zamora is a Licensed Professional Engineer and worked for 15 years in the private sector specifically at Baxter Healthcare Corporation in its operation at Jayuya Puerto Rico. At the facility he worked at the Quality and Engineering areas. He directed at once the Environmental Engineering, Health and Safety, Plant Engineering, Utility, Security and Maintenance areas.

Under his leadership the Baxter Jayuya was awarded several times with the Best Environmental Program Award for Baxter Global and Puerto Rico Manufacturing Association Environmental Best Program Awards several times. He was awarded by the Environmental Protection Agency with the National Performance Awards on 2003. He manage to achieve the certifications of ISO 14001 Environmental Compliance and OHSAS 18001 Heath and Safety for the facility.

His leadership was recognized by Baxter Corporate several times been of the few Plant Engineers serving as an Environmental Health and Safety auditors used in facilities in Mexico, Costa Rica, Republica Dominicana, Illinois, Indiana, North Carolina and Memphis.

== Political career ==
Since his youth, Torres Zamora showed a penchant for leadership. In 1991, he was Vice President of the PNP Youth in Jayuya. In 2001, he was vice president, and then President of the PNP in Jayuya. From 2005 to 2008, he was elected to the Municipal Assembly of the town, where he served as his party speaker.

Torres Zamora ran for an election spot at the 2008 primaries but lost. However, in 2010, after Iris Miriam Ruíz was sworn in as Ombudswoman, Torres Zamora was called to fill the vacancy. He was sworn in on June 10, 2010.

At the 2012 primaries, Torres Zamora received the support of his party to run again for the House of Representatives. He was the candidate with the second-most votes, after incumbent Speaker Jenniffer González. However, he was defeated at the general election.

On December 26, 2012, Governor and President of the PNP Luis Fortuño appointed Torres Zamora as Secretary General of the party.

On June 6, 2016, Torres Zamora was elected as one of the six at-large representative candidates of the New Progressive Party to participate in the 2016 General Elections. He had the fourth-most votes in the primaries for at-large representative.

In the 2016 General Election Torres Zamora was elected as one of the 11 Puerto Rico at-large Representatives, with the sixth-most votes. Later the NPP Caucus elected Pichy Torres Zamora as the new Speaker Pro-Tempore of the Puerto Rico House of Representatives. He was sworn in on January 2, 2017, as Puerto Rico Representative and elected Speaker Pro Tempore on January 9, 2017.

In September 2025, José Pichy Torres Zamora, along with progressive José Varella, introduced a legislative measure to create the position of vice governor in Puerto Rico.

== Controversy ==
In early 2019, the people of the municipality of Loíza and others were offended and demanded an apology after Torres Zamora revealed a 2012 Facebook post by then-Secretary General of the Popular Democratic Party José Nazario Álvarez making a racist comment on an image of a black woman stating she was "as black as carbon.. you only find those in Loíza".

== Personal life ==
Torres Zamora married Ivelisse Colon Berrios on March 7, 1998, they met at college in 1988 where their friendship began. From this union they raised two boys, Joseluis who was born in 1998 and Felipe Antonio who was born in 2007. They separated in 2013 and divorced in 2015 after 15 years.

Ivelisse Colon Berrios (Former Commissioner of Financial Institution of Puerto Rico) died on July 6, 2017; at that time he gained full custody of his two sons Joseluis Ernesto(19) and Felipe Antonio (10).

House of Representatives of Puerto Rico
Preceded by Roberto Rivera	Speaker pro tempore of the Puerto Rico House of Representatives; 2017	Succeeded by Lourdes Ramos; Acting
Preceded by Lourdes Ramos; Acting	Speaker pro tempore of the Puerto Rico House of Representatives; 2018–2020	Succeeded by Conny Varela
Preceded by Angel Matos García	Majority Leader of the Puerto Rico House of Representatives; 2025–present	Incumbent
