= Iris Miriam Ruíz =

Puerto Rican politician

Puerto Rico Ombudswoman
- In office 2010–2020
- Preceded by: Kevin Miguel Rivera
- Succeeded by: Edwin García Feliciano

At-Large Member of the Puerto Rico House of Representatives
- In office 1997–2010
- Succeeded by: José Torres Zamora

Personal details
- Born: January 29, 1951 (age 75) Rio Piedras, Puerto Rico
- Party: New Progressive Party
- Spouse: Roberto Cruz Rodríguez
- Education: University of Puerto Rico (BA)
- Profession: Politician

Iris Miriam Ruiz Class (born January 29, 1951) is a Puerto Rican politician who served in the Puerto Rico House of Representatives and currently holds the office of Ombudswoman.

Ruiz, a member of the New Progressive Party, served as At-Large Representative from 1997 to 2010 and as Chairwoman of the New Progressive Party Women's Organization from 2002 to 2010. She was designated by Puerto Rico Governor Luis Fortuño as the Puerto Rico Ombudsman or "Ombudswoman" in March 2010.

She obtained her Bachelor of Arts from the University of Puerto Rico, was a member of the theater group Teatro del 60′ of which she was appointed as its administrator of both the group and its theater hall Sylvia Rexach. She worked as a journalist and was awarded for her television reports

A former television reporter, she is married to former Representative Roberto Cruz Rodríguez, a member of the opposition Popular Democratic Party.

House of Representatives of Puerto Rico
Preceded by Roberto Maldonado Velez	Majority Leader of the Puerto Rico House of Representatives; 2005–2009	Succeeded by Rolando Crespo Arroyo
Preceded by Roberto Cruz Rodríguez	Minority Whip of the Puerto Rico House of Representatives; 2001-2005	Succeeded by Luis Raúl Torres Cruz
