= Héctor Torres Calderón =

Puerto Rican politician

Member of the Puerto Rico House of Representatives from the 12th District
- In office January 2, 2005 – January 2, 2017
- Preceded by: José Luis Colón
- Succeeded by: Guillermo Miranda Rivera

Personal details
- Born: Morovis, Puerto Rico
- Party: New Progressive Party (PNP)
- Children: 3
- Education: John Jay College of Criminal Justice (AS); American University of Puerto Rico (BCJ)
- Police career
- Department: Puerto Rico Police
- Rank: Patrol

Héctor Torres Calderón is a Puerto Rican politician affiliated with the New Progressive Party (PNP). He has been a member of the Puerto Rico House of Representatives since 2005 representing District 12.

== Early years and studies ==
Héctor Torres Calderón in Barrio Unibón in Morovis. He is the youngest of four children. Torres graduated from the Jaime A. Collazo del Río High School in Morovis.

Torres has an Associate degree in Criminal Justice from John Jay College of Criminal Justice in New York City, and a Bachelor's degree in the same field from the American University of Puerto Rico.

== Professional career ==
Torres was a police officer in the Puerto Rico Police Department as a Criminal Investigation Corps agent, and was Director of Security of Doctor's Center Hospital in Manatí.

== Political career ==
Torres ran for the House of Representatives of Puerto Rico at the 2004 general election. After being elected, he presided the Commission of Public Integrity. He was reelected in 2008 and 2012.

== Personal life ==
Torres is married and has three children.
