= José Garriga Picó =

Senator of Puerto Rico

Member of the Puerto Rico Senate from the at-large district
- In office 2005–2009

Personal details
- Born: March 19, 1948 (age 78) Coamo, Puerto Rico
- Party: New Progressive Party
- Spouse: Miriam B. Toledo David
- Children: Adriana; Claudia
- Education: Pontifical Catholic University of Puerto Rico (BA); New York University (MS, Ph.D)
- Profession: Politician

José Garriga Picó (born March 19, 1948) is a Puerto Rican politician and former senator affiliated with the New Progressive Party (PNP). He served as a member of the Senate of Puerto Rico from 2005 to 2009. Since 1990, Garriga Picó has been a professor of political science at the University of Puerto Rico, Río Piedras campus.

== Political career ==
In 2003, José Garriga Picó entered the political field with the New Progressive Party (PNP). He gained a position as a candidate to the Senate of Puerto Rico at the 2003 PNP primaries. He was elected at the 2004 general elections being the fifth candidate with most votes, and the third among PNP candidates.

José Garriga Picó ran for a second term, but was defeated at the 2008 PNP primaries. He then served as an adviser on Federal Affairs to Senate President Thomas Rivera Schatz.

== Personal life ==
During his college years, José Garriga Picó started practicing judo. In 1979, he received the black belt degree, Sho-Dan, in judo by the Kodokan Institute in Japan.
