= Speaker of the House of Representatives of Puerto Rico =

Highest legislative officer in the US territory

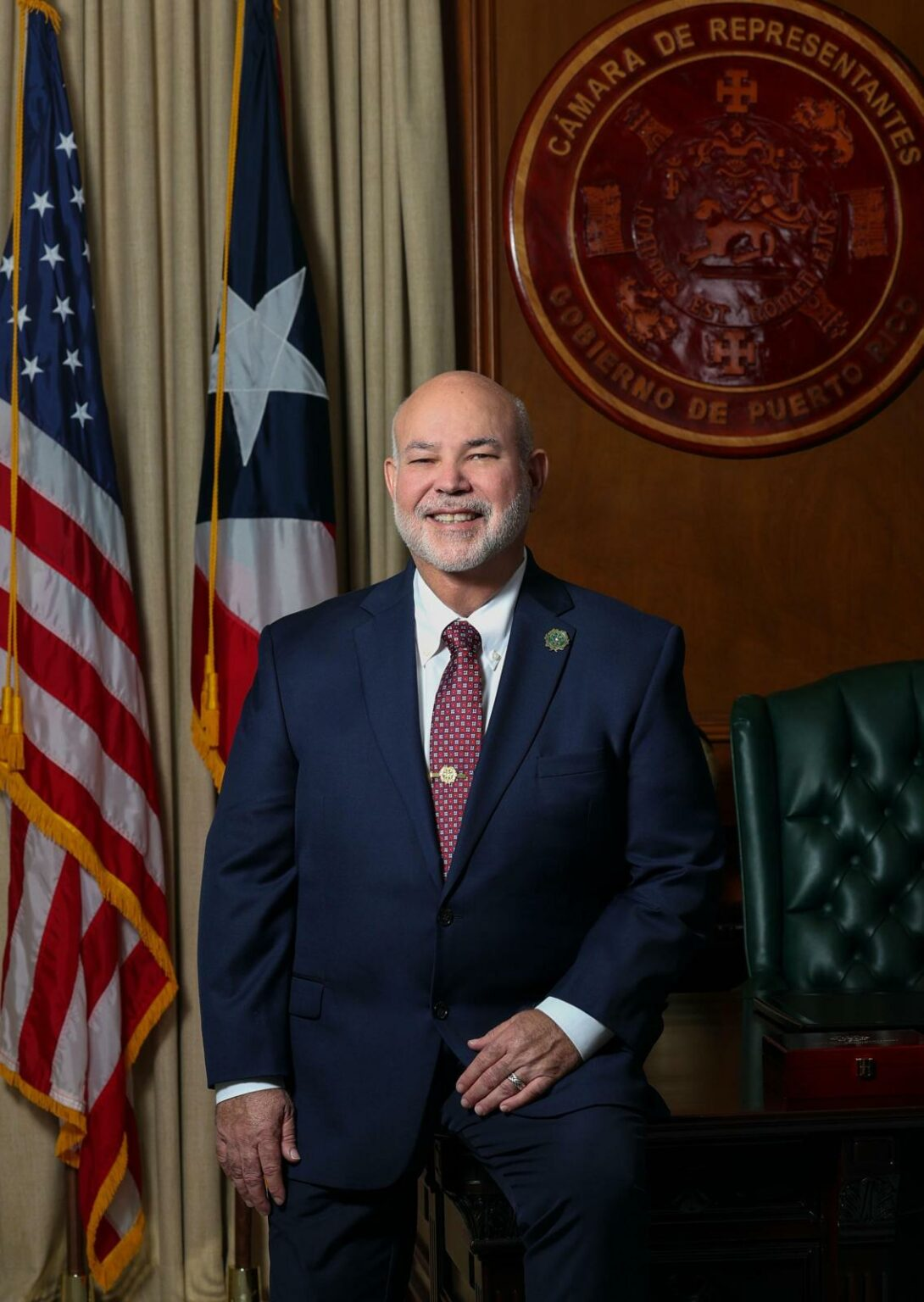
- Incumbent; Carlos "Johnny" Méndez Núñez since January 2, 2025
- Style: The Honorable diplomatic Mister Speaker when presiding over the House
- Nominator: nominated internally by the House
- Appointer: elected internally by the House
- Term length: 4 years
- Inaugural holder: Manuel F. Rossy
- Formation: Foraker Act; Jones–Shafroth Act; Article III of the Constitution of Puerto Rico
- Deputy: Speaker pro tempore

The President of the House of Representatives of Puerto Rico —commonly called the Speaker of the House (Spanish: Presidente de la Cámara de Representantes)— is the highest-ranking officer and the presiding officer of the House of Representatives of Puerto Rico. The Speaker has voting powers as it is elected amongst the own members of the House as established by Article III of the Constitution of Puerto Rico. The Constitution, however, does not establish its functions and since the House is the only body authorized by the Constitution to regulate its own internal affairs, the functions of the Speaker vary from session to session—save being called "Speaker" as the Constitution establishes. The Speaker is typically elected during the House inaugural session.

When absent, the Speaker is substituted by the Speaker pro tempore. Its counterpart in the Senate is the President of the Senate.

The current Speaker is Carlos Johnny Méndez, representative District 36 from the New Progressive Party

== Background ==
The Speaker traces its history back to more than 126 years ago when the Foraker Act formally established the post on April 12, 1900. Several laws eventually superseded said act, and the post was eventually established by the Constitution of Puerto Rico, specifically Article III, which establishes that, "[...]the House of Representatives [shall elect] a Speaker from among [its] members." The Constitution, however, does not establish what a "Speaker" is nor what its function should be. Internal rules adopted by the House through a simple resolution establish its definition, functions, responsibilities, and legal scope.

== Functions ==
Typically the Speaker is responsible for the observance and compliance of the House internal rules. He also typically:

- presides all joint commissions,
- resolves and decides all parliamentary situations and rules of order brought in sessions,
- names all permanent and special commissions of the House, as well as being a member ex officio of each one,
- signs all bills, joint resolutions, concurrent resolutions, reorganization plans, and simple resolutions approved by the House and the Legislative Assembly,
- convenes special sessions of the House,
- maintains order and decorum in the House, a responsibility typically delegated to the Sergeant-at-Arms of the House,
- must vote in all matters presented in the House (can not abstain),
- represents the House in all forums,
- is responsible for all administrative matters of the House, a responsibility typically delegated to the Secretary of the House,
- prepares an annual and monthly report detailing all work done by the House,
- appoints an internal auditor for the House,
- prepares the budget of the House,
- prepares a registry of all lobbyists that must be freely available to the public,
- is responsible of providing free access to the public to all works generated by the House, and
- offers training and continuing education opportunities to House members, advisors, and employees.

== Speakers ==
- 1900–1904: Manuel F. Rossy Calderón
- 1905–1906: Rosendo Matienzo Cintrón
- 1907–1907: Francisco P. Acuña y Paniagua
- 1907–1918: José de Diego Martínez
- 1918–1920: Juan Bernardo Huyke
- 1921–1923: Cayetano Coll y Cuchí
- 1923–1924: Miguel Guerra Mondragrón
- 1925–1930: José Tous Soto
- 1930–1932: Manuel F. Rossy Calderón
- 1932–1932: Rafael Alonso Torres
- 1933–1940: Miguel A. García Méndez
- 1941–1943: Samuel R. Quiñones
- 1943–1944: Rafael Arrillaga Torrens
- 1944–1944: Rafael Rodríguez Pacheco
- 1945–1945: María L. Gómez Garriga
- 1945–1948: Francisco M. Susoni Abreu
- 1948–1963: Ernesto Ramos Antonini
- 1963–1964: Santiago Polanco Abreu
- 1965–1968: Arcilio Alvarado Alvarado
- 1969–1972: Angel Viera Martínez
- 1973–1976: Luis E. Ramos Yordán
- 1977–1982: Angel Viera Martínez
- 1982–1984: Severo Colberg Ramírez
- 1985–1992: Jose Ronaldo Jarabo
- 1993–1996: Zaida R. Hernández Torres
- 1997–2000: Edison Misla Aldarondo
- 2001–2004: Carlos Vizcarrondo Irizarry
- 2005–2008: José Aponte Hernández
- 2009–2012: Jenniffer González Colón
- 2013–2016: Jaime Perelló
- 2016-2016(acting): Roberto Rivera Ruiz de Porras
- 2017–2020: Carlos Johnny Méndez
- 2021–2025: Rafael Hernández Montañez
- 2025–Present: Carlos Johnny Méndez

Republican Party Union Party New Progressive Party Popular Democratic Party
#	Portrait	Name	Took office	Left office	Party	Speaker pro tempore
1		Manuel F. Rossy Calderón	December 3, 1900	December 31, 1904	Republican	
2		Rosendo Matienzo Cintrón	January 10, 1905	December 31, 1906	Union	
3		Francisco P. Acuña y Paniagua	January 14, 1907	March 6, 1907	Union	
4	José de Diego	José de Diego Martínez	March 6, 1907	July 16, 1918	Union	Juan Bernardo Huyke
5		Juan Bernardo Huyke	November 26, 1918	December 31, 1920	Union	Miguel Guerra Mondragón
6		Cayetano Coll y Cuchí	February 14, 1921	February 11, 1923	Union	Alfonso Lastra Chárriez
7		Miguel Guerra Mondragrón	February 12, 1923	December 31, 1924	Union	Alfonso Lastra Chárriez
8		José Tous Soto	February 9, 1925	February 18, 1930	Republican	Miguel Guerra Modragón; 1925–1929 Benigno Fernández García; 1929–1930
9		Manuel F. Rossy Calderón	February 20, 1930	August 6, 1932	Republican	Enrique Landrón Otero; 1930 Rafael Alonso Torres; 1930–1931
10		Rafael Alonso Torres	October 18, 1932	December 31, 1932	Socialist	Jorge Romaní
11		Miguel A. García Méndez	February 13, 1933	December 31, 1940	Republican	Rafael Alonso Torres
12	Samuel Quiñones	Samuel R. Quiñones Quiñones	February 12, 1941	March 5, 1943	PPD	Luis Sánchez Frasqueri
13		Rafael Arrillaga Torrens	March 5, 1943	February 24, 1944	Socialist	Julio Reguero González
14		Rafael Rodríguez Pacheco	February 24, 1944	December 31, 1944	Republican	Julio Reguero González
15		María L. Gómez Garriga	January 11, 1945	February 12, 1945	PPD	Guillermo Alicea Campos
16		Francisco M. Susoni Abreu	February 12, 1945	June 5, 1948	PPD	Ernesto Ramos Antonini
17		Ernesto Ramos Antonini	June 22, 1948	January 9, 1963	PPD	Benjamín Ortiz Ortiz; 1949–1952 María L. Gómez Garriga; 1953–1956 Jorge Font Saldaña; 1957–1962
18	Santiago Polanco	Santiago Polanco Abreu	January 14, 1963	December 31, 1964	PPD	Benjamín Ortiz Ortiz
19		Arcilio Alvarado Alvarado	January 11, 1965	December 31, 1968	PPD	Aguedo Mojica
20		Angel Viera Martínez	January 13, 1969	December 31, 1972	PNP	Rubén Otero Bosco; 1969–1970 José E. Salichs Lope de Haro; 1970–1972
21		Luis E. Ramos Yordán	January 8, 1973	December 31, 1976	PPD	Severo Colberg Ramírez
22		Angel Viera Martínez	January 10, 1977	January 28, 1982	PNP	José N. Granados Navedos; 1977 – 1978 José E. Salichs Lope de Haro; 1978 – December 31, 1980 Severo Colberg Ramírez; 1981 – 1982
23		Severo Colberg Ramírez	January 28, 1982	December 31, 1984	PPD	Presby Santiago García
24		José R. Jarabo Alvarez	January 14, 1985	December 31, 1992	PPD	Samuel Ramírez Torres
25		Zaida R. Hernández Torres	January 11, 1993	December 31, 1996	PNP	Edison Misla Aldarondo
26		Edison Misla Aldarondo	January 13, 1997	December 31, 2000	PNP	José N. Granados Navedos; January 1997 – June 30, 1999 Edwin Mundo Ríos; June 30, 1999 – December 31, 2000
27		Carlos Vizcarrondo Irizarry	January 8, 2001	December 31, 2004	PPD	Ferdinand Pérez Román
28	José Aponte	José F. Aponte Hernández	January 10, 2005	December 31, 2008	PNP	Epifanio Jiménez
29		Jenniffer A. González Colón	January 12, 2009	December 31, 2012	PNP	Gabriel Rodríguez Aguiló
30		Jaime Perelló	January 14, 2013	August 29, 2016	PPD	Roberto Rivera
31		Carlos Johnny Méndez	January 9, 2017	December 31, 2020	PNP	José Torres Zamora
32		Rafael Hernández Montañez	January 11, 2021	January 2, 2025	PPD	José "Conny" Varela
33		Carlos Johnny Méndez	January 2, 2025	present	PNP	Angel Peña Ramírez

== Speakers pro tempore ==
The Vice President of the House of Representatives of Puerto Rico (commonly called the Speaker pro tempore) is the second highest-ranking officer of the House of Representatives of Puerto Rico. The Speaker pro tempore substitutes the Speaker of the House in his absence. The Speaker pro tempore has a counterpart in the Senate by the President pro tempore of the Senate.

- 1907–1918: Juan B. Huyke Bozello
- 1918–:1290: Miguel Guerra Mondragón
- 1921–1924: Alfonso Lastra Chárriez
- 1925–1929: Miguel Guerra Modragón
- 1929–1930: Benigno Fernández García
- 1930–1930: Enrique Landrón Otero
- 1930–1931: Rafael Alonso Torres
- 1932–1932: Jorge Romaní
- 1933–1940: Rafael Alonso Torres
- 1941–1943: Luis Sánchez Frasqueri
- 1943–1944: Julio Reguero González
- 1945–1945: Guillermo Alicea Campos
- 1945–1948: Ernesto Ramos Antonini
- 1949–1952: Benjamín Ortiz Ortiz
- 1953–1956: María L. Gómez Garriga
- 1957–1962: Jorge Font Saldaña
- 1963–1964: Benjamín Ortiz Ortiz
- 1965–1968: Aguedo Mojica
- 1969–1970: Rubén Otero Bosco
- 1970–1972: José E. Salichs Lopez de Haro
- 1973–1976: Severo Colberg Ramírez
- 1977–1978: José N. Granados Navedos
- 1978–1980: José E. Salichs Lopez de Haro
- 1981–1982: Severo Colberg Ramírez
- 1982–1984: Presby Santiago García
- 1985–1993: Samuel Ramírez Torres
- 1993–1997: Edison Misla Aldarondo
- 1997–1999: José N. Granados Navedos
- 1999–2001: Edwin Mundo Ríos
- 2001–2005: Ferdinand Pérez Román
- 2005–2009: Epifanio Jiménez Cruz
- 2009-2013: Gabriel Rodríguez Aguiló
- 2013–2017: Roberto Rivera Ruiz
- 2017-2021: José Torres Zamora
- 2021-2025: José "Conny" Varela
- 2025-Present: Angel Peña Ramírez

== See also ==
- List of Legislative Assemblies of Puerto Rico
