= Epifanio Jiménez =

Puerto Rican politician

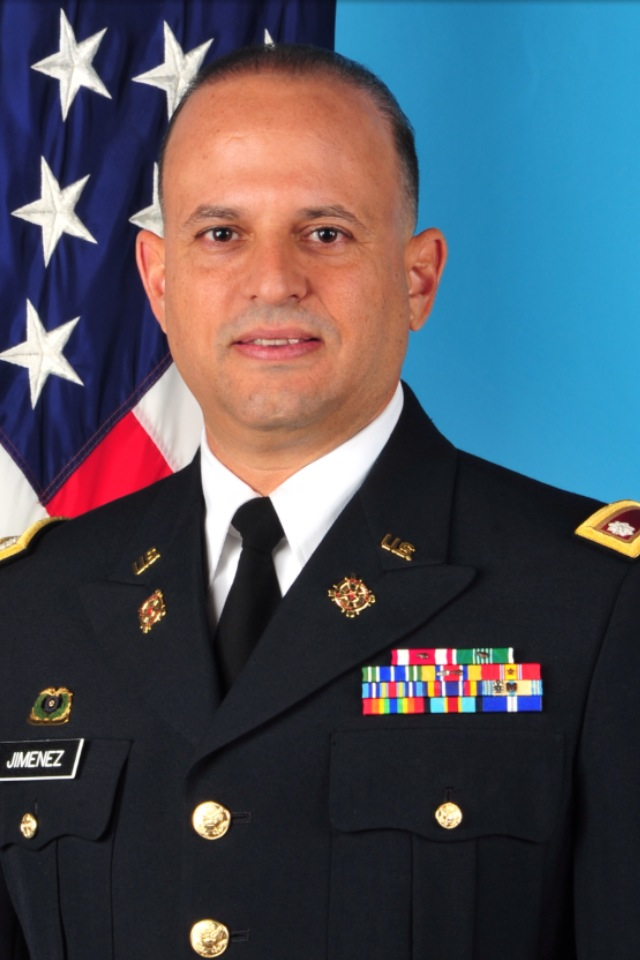
- Epifanio Jimenez Cruz

Member of the Puerto Rico House of Representatives from the 39th District
- In office 1994–2008
- Preceded by: Gilberto Moreno
- Succeeded by: Elizabeth Casado

Speaker pro tempore of the House of Representatives of Puerto Rico
- In office 2004–2008
- Preceded by: Ferdinand Pérez
- Succeeded by: Gabriel Rodríguez Aguiló

Personal details
- Born: June 11, 1965 (age 61) Carolina, Puerto Rico
- Party: New Progressive Party (PNP)
- Children: 3
- Education: University of Puerto Rico (BA)

Military service
- Allegiance: United States of America
- Branch/service: Army National Guard
- Years of service: 1988 - 2015
- Rank: Lieutenant colonel
- Awards: Meritorious Service Medal (1)

Epifanio "Epi" Jiménez Cruz (born June 11, 1965) in Carolina, Puerto Rico is a Puerto Rican politician who held many occupations in the New Progressive Party and was elected to a seat at 40th district in the Puerto Rico House of Representatives. Served as an officer in the Army National Guard of Puerto Rico.

== Early years and studies ==
Epifanio Jiménez Cruz is the son of Epifanio Jiménez Meléndez and Miriam Cruz Rodríguez. He had primary and secondary studies at Colegio La Piedad in Isla Verde, Puerto Rico until he graduated. Later he went to the University of Puerto Rico where he earned a bachelor's degree in commerce with a concentration in Human Resources. Jiménez also enrolled in the U.S. Army ROTC program where in 1988 he was commissioned as a 2nd lieutenant and joined the Puerto Rico Army National Guard. Epifanio Jiménez retired from the Puerto Rico National Guard in 2015 with rank of Lieutenant Colonel and continues to work on the logistics branch at the National Guard of Puerto Rico. Epifanio Jiménez is the executive director of the PRNG Institutional Trust (FIGNA).

== Political career ==
In 1984 he began a political career as an electoral worker and president of the New Progressive Party municipal youth committee in Carolina, Puerto Rico. In 1994 Epifanio Jiménez was an aide of Senator Charlie Rodriguez and ran in a special election where he succeeded to become the Representative for the 39th district in the Puerto Rico House of Representatives. Jiménez was reelected in the 1996, 2000 and 2004 general elections. In 2004 the 39 district became the 40th district. From 2004 to 2008 Jiménez was the Speaker pro tempore of the House of Representatives of Puerto Rico. In 2008, Jiménez ran for Mayor of Carolina, Puerto Rico. The standing mayor, José Aponte Dalmau from the Popular Democratic Party, was able to keep his position.

== Military awards and decorations ==

| 1 | Meritorious Service Medal with bronze oak leaf cluster | | Army Commendation Medal with bronze oak leaf cluster |
| 2 | Army Achievement Medal | Reserve Good Conduct Medal with silver and bronze oak leaf clusters | National Defense Service Medal with bronze service star |
| 3 | Global War on Terrorism Expeditionary Medal | Global War on Terrorism Service Medal | Armed Forces Reserve Medal with Bronze Hourglass and "M" Device |
| 4 | Army Service Ribbon | Army Overseas Service Ribbon | NATO Medal |

== Personal life ==
He is married to Elizabeth Gallo (since 1988) and has 3 children Epifanio, Gian Carlo and Gabriel. He still lives in Carolina, Puerto Rico.

House of Representatives of Puerto Rico
| Preceded by Gilberto Moreno | Member of the Puerto Rico House of Representatives from the 40th District; 2004–2008 | Succeeded by Elizabeth Casado |
| Preceded by Gilberto Moreno | Member of the Puerto Rico House of Representatives from the 39th District; 1994–2004 | Succeeded by Roberto Rivera Ruiz |
| Preceded by Ferdinand Pérez | Speaker pro tempore of the Puerto Rico House of Representatives; 2005–2009 | Succeeded by Gabriel Rodríguez Aguiló |
