= Rolando Crespo =

Puerto Rican politician (born 1974)

Rolando Crespo Arroyo

Majority Leader of the Puerto Rico House of Representatives
- In office January 2, 2008 – February 25, 2011
- Succeeded by: Carlos J. Méndez Nuñez

At-Large Member of the Puerto Rico House of Representatives
- In office January 1, 2005 – February 2011
- Succeeded by: José Enrique Meléndez

Personal details
- Born: November 9, 1975 (age 50) Aguadilla, Puerto Rico
- Party: New Progressive Party (PNP)
- Spouse: Flor de Liz Pérez
- Children: Ronald Crespo Badillo; Mónica Crespo Badillo
- Education: Inter American University of Puerto Rico, Aguadilla Campus (BA)

Rolando Crespo Arroyo (born November 9, 1974) is a former Representative of Puerto Rico and former Majority Leader of the New Progressive Party within the Puerto Rico House of Representatives who resigned in February 2011 after testing positive for cocaine in a drug test. He was replaced as Majority Leader by Carlos J. Méndez Núñez.

== Personal life ==
Rolando Crespo Arroyo was a former Representative of Puerto Rico and former Majority Leader of the New Progressive Party within the Puerto Rico House of Representatives

Rolando Crespo Arroyo was born in Aguadilla, Puerto Rico on November 9, 1975. He is the son of Candido Crespo and Lydia Arroyo. His father is a lawyer and his mother is a housewife. In 1999, Rolando received a Bachelor of Arts in Criminal Justice with a concentration in Sociology from the Interamerican University of Puerto Rico Aguadilla campus. In addition, studies leading to a Master's degree in Scholar Psychology.

Rolando has been married twice. His first marriage was when he was 19 years old. He has two children from that relationship. In December 2011, Crespo married entrepreneur Dr. Flor de Liz Pérez in Aguadilla.

House of Representatives of Puerto Rico
Preceded by Iris M. Ruiz Class	Majority Leader of the Puerto Rico House of Representatives; 2008–2011	Succeeded by Carlos J. Méndez Nuñez
