= 2016 Puerto Rico Republican presidential primary =

- March 6, 2016

23 pledged delegates to the Republican National Convention
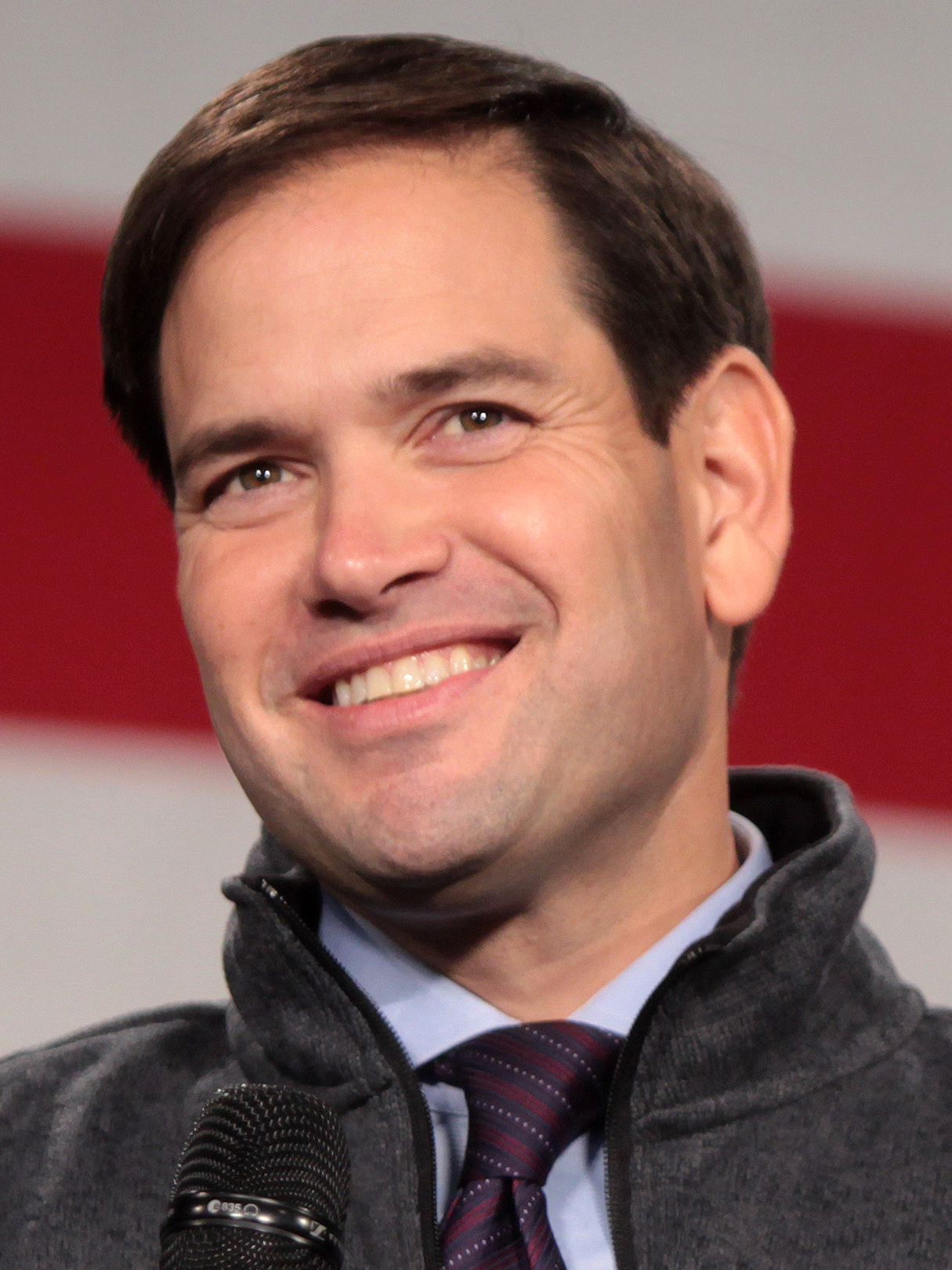

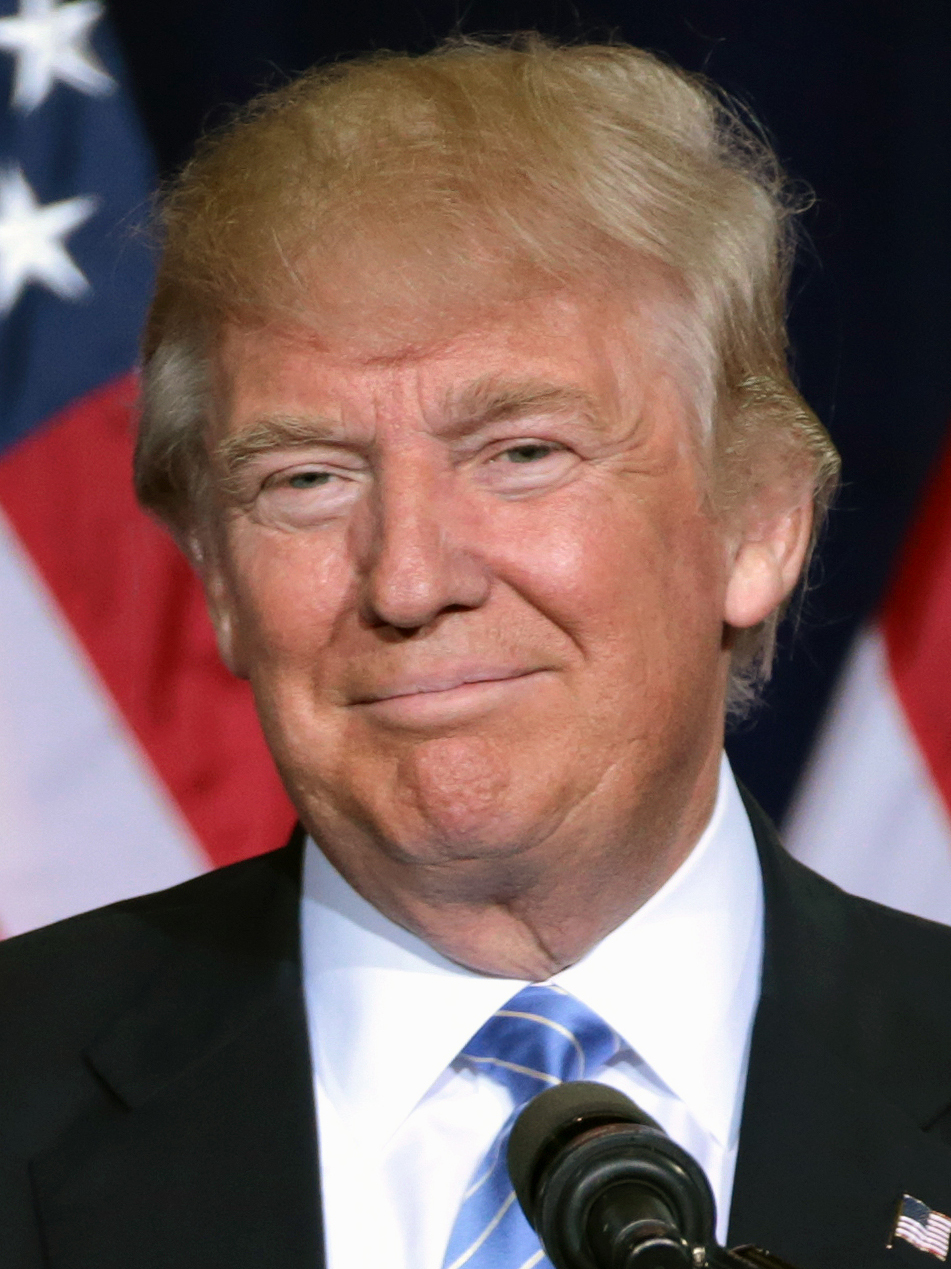

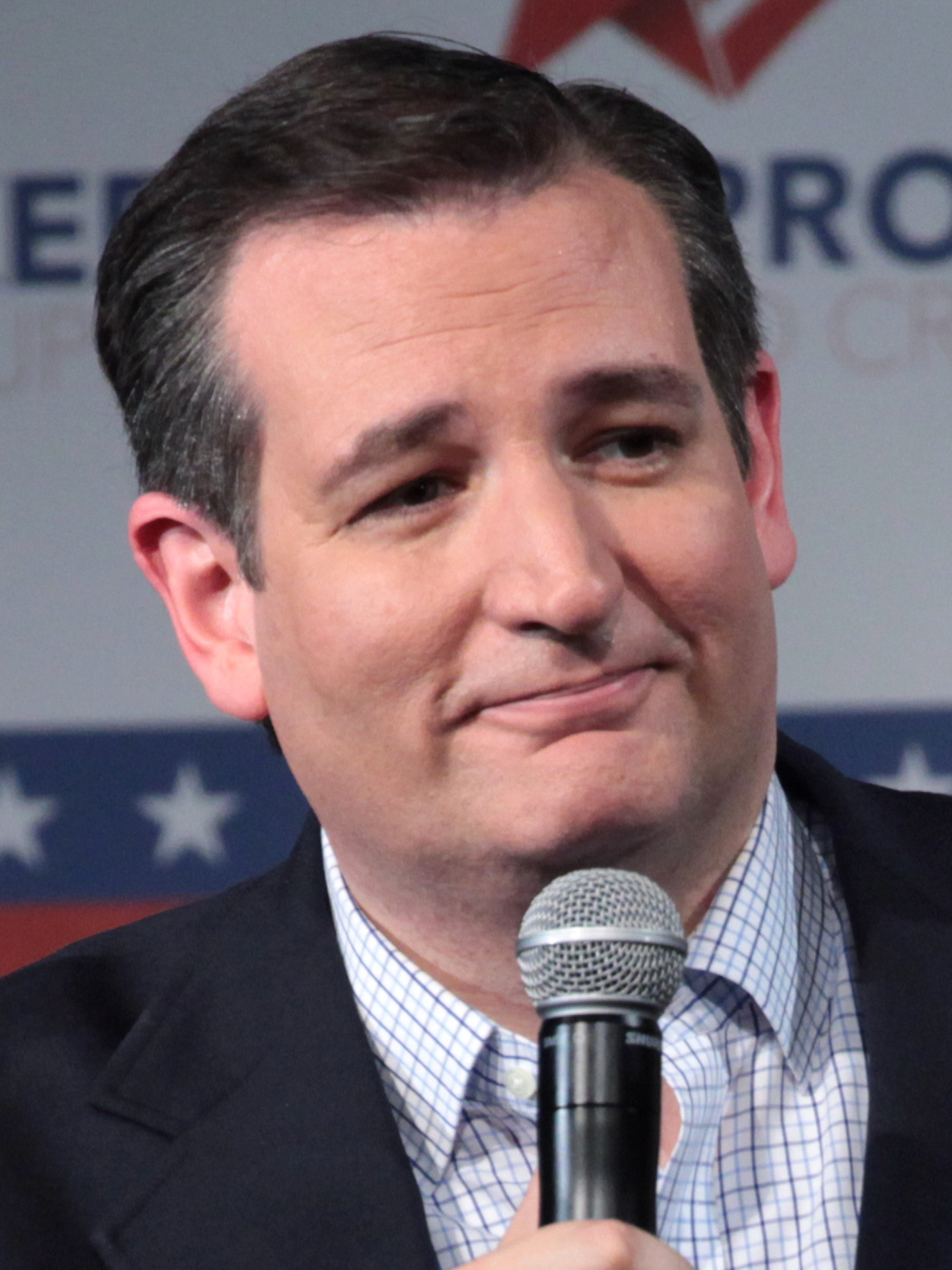
Candidate	Marco Rubio	Donald Trump	Ted Cruz
Home state	Florida	New York	Texas
Delegate count	23	0	0
Popular vote	27,485	5,052	3,340
Percentage	70.2%	13.3%	8.8%

The 2016 Puerto Rico Republican presidential primary took place on March 6 in the U.S. territory of Puerto Rico as one of the Republican Party's primaries ahead of the 2016 presidential election.

While that day no other Republican primaries were held, the Democratic Party held their Maine caucuses. The Democratic Party's own Puerto Rico caucus took place on June 5.

== Results ==
Puerto Rico Republican primary, March 6, 2016
Candidate	Votes	Percentage	Actual delegate count		
Candidate	Votes	Percentage	Bound	Unbound	Total
Marco Rubio	28,937	70.24%	23	0	23
Donald Trump	5,474	13.29%	0	0	0
Ted Cruz	3,610	8.76%	0	0	0
Other	1,540	3.74%	0	0	0
John Kasich	582	1.41%	0	0	0
Carly Fiorina (withdrawn)	375	0.91%	0	0	0
Jeb Bush (withdrawn)	296	0.72%	0	0	0
Ben Carson (withdrawn)	168	0.41%	0	0	0
Mike Huckabee (withdrawn)	77	0.19%	0	0	0
Rand Paul (withdrawn)	48	0.12%	0	0	0
Rick Santorum (withdrawn)	36	0.09%	0	0	0
Jim Gilmore (withdrawn)	30	0.07%	0	0	0
Chris Christie (withdrawn)	23	0.06%	0	0	0
Unprojected delegates:			0	0	0
Total:	41,196	100%	23	0	23
Source: The Green Papers
