= 2016 United States presidential primaries in Puerto Rico =

2016 Puerto Rico presidential primaries
- March 6, 2016 (Republican); June 6, 2016 (Democratic)

Although Puerto Rico did not participate in the November 8, 2016, general election because it is a territory and not a state, the five non-incorporated territories that send delegates to the United States House of Representatives participated in the presidential primaries.

In the presidential primaries, Puerto Rico voters expressed their preferences for the Democratic and Republican parties' respective nominees for president. Registered members of each party only voted in their party's primary, while voters who were unaffiliated chose any one primary in which to vote. There were 60 Democratic delegates and 23 Republican delegates to be allocated.

== Primary elections ==
=== Republican primary ===
The Republican primary took place on March 6, 2016: Twelve candidates appeared on the Republican presidential primary ballot, with only four still possessing active campaigns: Marco Rubio, Donald Trump, Ted Cruz, and John Kasich

Sen. Marco Rubio carried the primary with 73.8% of the vote and was awarded all 23 delegates due to the territory's 50% winner-take-all threshold.

Puerto Rico Republican primary, March 6, 2016
Candidate	Votes	Percentage	Actual delegate count		
Candidate	Votes	Percentage	Bound	Unbound	Total
Marco Rubio	28,937	70.24%	23	0	23
Donald Trump	5,474	13.29%	0	0	0
Ted Cruz	3,610	8.76%	0	0	0
Other	1,540	3.74%	0	0	0
John Kasich	582	1.41%	0	0	0
Carly Fiorina (withdrawn)	375	0.91%	0	0	0
Jeb Bush (withdrawn)	296	0.72%	0	0	0
Ben Carson (withdrawn)	168	0.41%	0	0	0
Mike Huckabee (withdrawn)	77	0.19%	0	0	0
Rand Paul (withdrawn)	48	0.12%	0	0	0
Rick Santorum (withdrawn)	36	0.09%	0	0	0
Jim Gilmore (withdrawn)	30	0.07%	0	0	0
Chris Christie (withdrawn)	23	0.06%	0	0	0
Unprojected delegates:			0	0	0
Total:	41,196	100%	23	0	23
Source: The Green Papers

=== Democratic caucus ===
The Democratic caucus took place on June 5, 2016.

Puerto Rico Democratic caucuses, June 5, 2016
Candidate	Popular vote		Estimated delegates		
Candidate	Count	Percentage	Pledged	Unpledged	Total
Hillary Clinton	52,658	59.74%	36	7	42
Bernie Sanders	33,368	37.85%	24	0	24
Rocky De La Fuente	300	0.35%			
Total	88,149	100%	60	7	67

== See also ==
- Democratic Party presidential debates, 2016
- Democratic Party presidential primaries, 2016
- Republican Party presidential debates, 2016
- Republican Party presidential primaries, 2016
