= José Chico Vega =

Member of the Puerto Rico House of Representatives

At-Large Member of the Puerto Rico House of Representatives
- In office January 2, 2001 – January 1, 2013

Personal details
- Born: San Juan, Puerto Rico
- Party: New Progressive Party (PNP)
- Children: 2
- Education: Interamerican University of Puerto Rico

José Chico Vega is a Puerto Rican politician affiliated with the New Progressive Party (PNP). He was a member of the Puerto Rico House of Representatives from 2000 to 2013.

== Early years and studies ==
José Chico Vega was born in San Juan, Puerto Rico but was raised in Camuy. Chico studied at the Interamerican University of Puerto Rico receiving a Bachelor's degree in Marketing and Hotel Management.

Chico also served with the National Guard of Puerto Rico and the Florida National Guard for six years.

== Professional career ==
Chico began his professional career in the food processing business.

During his career, he has received several awards and recognitions. In 1991, the Federal Administration of Small Businesses granted him the award for Distinguished Retailer of the Year. He also received the Outstanding Retailer Salesperson Award from Shell Oil Company.

Chico was elected President of the United Center of Retailers in January 1997, and served in that position until July 1999. He had previously served as Convention President, Marketing Director, and Service Director. Chico was also member of the Board of Directors of the Hispanic Chamber of Commerce of the United States

== Political career ==
In 1999, Chico was elected by the New Progressive Party to fill a vacancy in the House of Representatives. He was officially elected for the seat at the 2000 general elections. During that term, he was a member of the Committees of Treasury, Socioeconomic Development and Planning, Industry and Commerce, Federal Affairs, among others.

Chico was chosen by his party at the 2003 primaries for an election spot, and he was again reelected at the 2004 general elections. During his second term, Chico presided the Committee of Socioeconomic Development and Planning, and was Vice-president of the Treasury Committee, among others.

In 2008, Chico was reelected for a third term as representative.

In 2012, Chico lost his candidacy for reelection at the PNP primaries held on March 18.

== Personal life ==
Chico is married and has two daughters.
