= María de Lourdes Ramos Rivera =

Puerto Rican politician (born 1960)

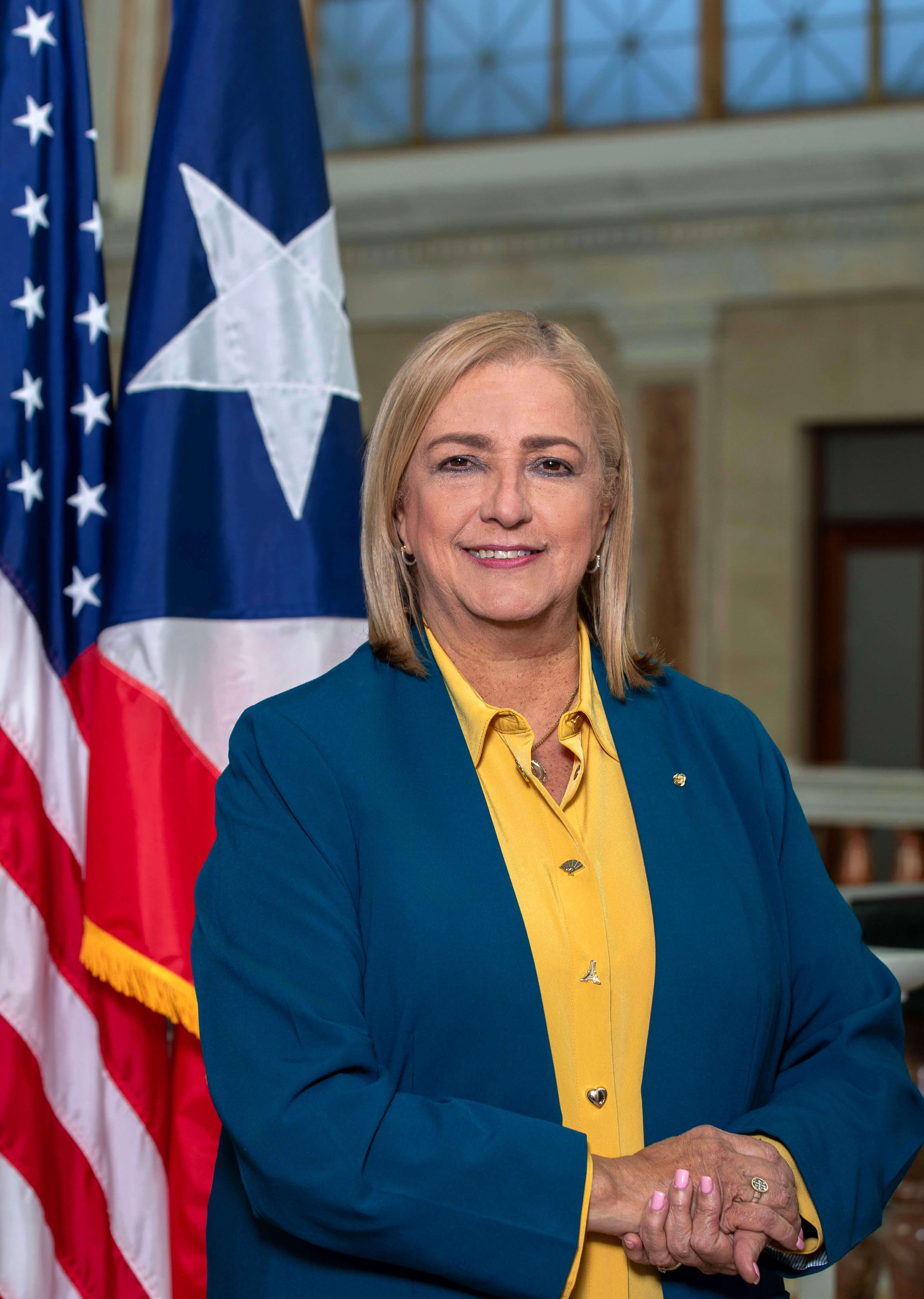

Speaker pro tempore of the Puerto Rico House of Representatives Acting
- In office August 14, 2017 – January 2018
- Preceded by: Pichy Torres
- Succeeded by: Pichy Torres

Majority Whip of the Puerto Rico House of Representatives
- In office January 2, 2005 – January 2, 2009
- Preceded by: Héctor Ferrer
- Succeeded by: Angel Pérez Otero

Member of the Puerto Rico House of Representatives from the at-large district
- Incumbent
- Assumed office January 2, 2005
- In office March 26, 1996 – January 2, 2001

Personal details
- Born: María de Lourdes Ramos Rivera; August 6, 1960 (age 65) Juncos, Puerto Rico
- Party: New Progressive
- Other political affiliations: Republican
- Education: University of Puerto Rico (BBA)

Maria de Lourdes Ramos Rivera (born August 6, 1960) is a Puerto Rican politician who currently serves in the Puerto Rican House of Representatives from the at-large district since 2005. She previously served in that position from 1996 to 2001.

== Early years and studies ==
Ramos was born in Juncos, Puerto Rico on 6, 1960. She completed a Bachelor's degree in Business Administration from the University of Puerto Rico, with a major as Executive Secretary.

== Public service ==
Ramos began her career as Secretary of the Municipal Assembly of Juncos. In 1993, she was appointed as member of the Women's Affair Commission by then Governor Pedro Rosselló.

== Political career ==
In 1995, Ramos successfully presented her candidacy to fill a vacant seat in the House of Representatives of Puerto Rico due to the resignation of Representative Jorge L. Navarro Alicea. Ramos was sworn in on March 26, 1996, as a Representative At-large under the New Progressive Party (PNP), becoming the first female from Juncos to occupy the position.

Ramos was officially elected in the 1996 general election, where she was the representative who received the most votes of all 11 winning candidates. In 1997, the Action Committee of Carolina gave her the Jesús T. Piñero Award. Still, after one term, Ramos was defeated for re-election at the 2000 general election, where she was the candidate with the fewest votes.

Ramos returned to the House of Representatives in 2005. After being sworn in, she was selected by her party as Majority Whip for that term.

After being in 2008, Ramos was appointed to preside the House Retirement Systems Committee. She was also a member of the House Government, Municipal Affairs, Consumer Affairs, and Education and Cooperativism Committees.

Ramos was reelected for a fourth term in 2012.

House of Representatives of Puerto Rico
Preceded by Héctor Ferrer	Majority Whip of the Puerto Rico House of Representatives; 2005–2009	Succeeded by Angel Pérez Otero
Preceded by Pichy Torres	Speaker pro tempore of the Puerto Rico House of Representatives; Acting; 2017–2018	Succeeded by Pichy Torres
