= 2016 Puerto Rico Democratic presidential primary =

- June 5, 2016

Candidate	Hillary Clinton	Bernie Sanders
Home state	New York	Vermont
Popular vote	52,658	33,368
Percentage	59.74%	37.85%
- Results by municipality Hillary Clinton Bernie Sanders No votes

The 2016 Puerto Rico Democratic presidential primary took place on June 5 in the U.S. territory of Puerto Rico as one of the Democratic Party's primaries ahead of the 2016 presidential election.

Clinton was a heavy favorite to win the territory's primary. In her two terms as United States Senator from New York, the state with the largest population of Puerto Rican-Americans, she gained a strong degree of familiarity with the island. Those connections helped her build institutional support from top Puerto Rico Democrats, including then-Governor Alejandro García Padilla.

No other Democratic or Republican primaries took place on the same day. The Republican Party's Puerto Rico primary took place on March 6, 2016.

== Results ==
Puerto Rico Democratic caucuses, June 5, 2016
Candidate	Popular vote		Estimated delegates		
Candidate	Count	Percentage	Pledged	Unpledged	Total
Hillary Clinton	52,658	59.74%	36	7	42
Bernie Sanders	33,368	37.85%	24	0	24
Rocky De La Fuente	300	0.35%			
Total	88,149	100%	60	7	67

=== Results By Districts ===
County	Clinton	Votes	Sanders	Votes
San Juan I	49.4%	6,472	46.4%	6,080
Bayamon II	56.9%	6,525	42.7%	4,897
Arecibo III	66.3%	8,011	33.1%	4,004
Mayagüez IV	57.6%	5,756	41.8%	4,176
Ponce V	65.7%	6,472	32.5%	3,199
Guayama VI	61.8%	6,574	28.6%	3,043
Humacao VII	61.6%	4,960	37.8%	3,046
Carolina VIII	61.1%	7,888	38.0%	4,923
Total	59.7%	52,658	37.9%	33,368
