= 26th Senate of Puerto Rico =

Session of the Puerto Rico Legislature

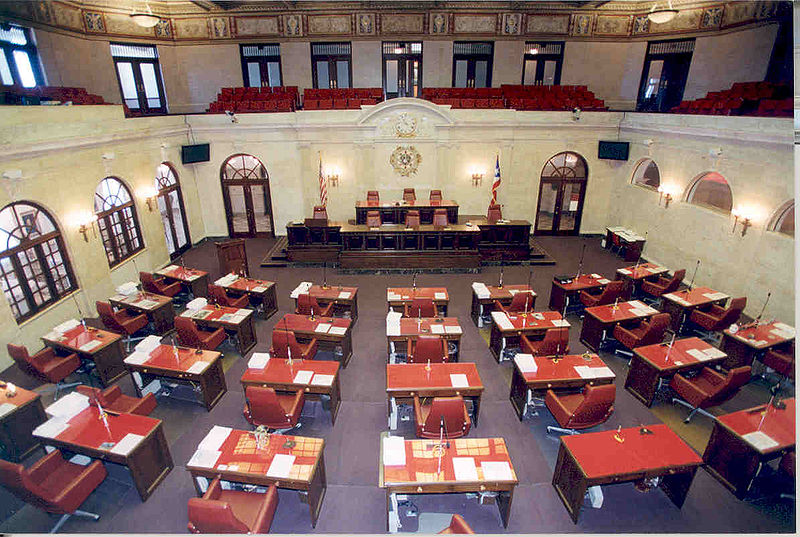

In session
- January 2, 2017 – January 1, 2021

Leadership
- President: Thomas Rivera Schatz
- President pro tem: Larry Seilhamer
- Majority Leader: Carmelo Ríos
- Majority Whip: Ángel Chayanne Martínez
- Minority Leaders: Eduardo Bhatia; Juan Dalmau; Vargas Vidot
- Minority Whip: José Luis Dalmau

Structure
- Seats: 30 voting members
- Parties represented: 21 PNP; 7 PPD; 1 PIP; 1 Independent
- Length of term: 4 years

Elections
- Last election: November 6, 2016
- Next election: November 8, 2020

Legislature
- 18th Legislative Assembly of Puerto Rico

Lower house
- 30th House of Representatives of Puerto Rico

Sessions
- 1st: January 14, 2017 – June 30, 2017
- 2nd: August 19, 2017 – November 19, 2017
- 3rd: January 13, 2018 – June 30, 2018
- 4th: August 18, 2018 – November 18, 2018
- 5th: January 12, 2019 – June 30, 2019
- 6th: August 17, 2019 – November 17, 2019
- 7th: January 11, 2020 – June 30, 2020
- 8th: August 15, 2020 – November 15, 2020

The 26th Senate of Puerto Rico is the upper house of the 18th Legislative Assembly of Puerto Rico. Its counterpart in the lower house is the 30th House of Representatives of Puerto Rico.

The body will meet from January 2, 2017, to January 1, 2021, while under the oversight of the fiscal control board established by PROMESA.

But in contrast to its standard composition, the numbers of legislators in this senate increased to 30 after the New Progressive Party (PNP in Spanish) won more than two thirds of the original 27 seats in contention during the 2016 general election. This provision was automatically triggered by Article Three of the Constitution of Puerto Rico which mandates that in such a case the number of minority legislators should total 9.

== Leadership ==
PPD PNP PIP Independent
Office	Senator	District	Party
President	Thomas Rivera Schatz	At-large	PNP
President pro tempore	Larry Seilhamer Rodríguez	At-large	PNP
Majority Leader	Carmelo Ríos	District II Bayamón	PNP
Majority Whip	Ángel Chayanne Martínez	District III Arecibo	PNP
Minority Leader	Eduardo Bhatia	At-large	PPD
Minority Whip	José Luis Dalmau	District VII Humacao	PPD
Minority Leader	Juan Dalmau	At-large	PIP
Minority Leader	Vargas Vidot	At-large	Independent

== Members ==
PPD PNP PIP Independent
District	Name	Affiliation
District I San Juan	Henry Neumann	PNP
District I San Juan	Miguel Romero	PNP
District II Bayamón	Migdalia Padilla	PNP
District II Bayamón	Carmelo Ríos	PNP
District III Arecibo	Ángel Chayanne Martínez	PNP
District III Arecibo	José Joito Pérez	PNP
District IV Mayagüez–Aguadilla	Luis Daniel Muñiz	PNP
District IV Mayagüez–Aguadilla	Evelyn Vázquez	PNP
District V Ponce	Luis Berdiel	PNP
District V Ponce	Nelson Cruz Santiago	PNP
District VI Guayama	Axel Roque	PNP
District VI Guayama	Carlos Rodríguez Mateo	PNP
District VII Humacao	Miguel Laureano	PNP
District VII Humacao	José Luis Dalmau	PPD
District VIII Carolina	Nayda Venegas	PNP
District VIII Carolina	Eric Correa	PNP
At-large	Zoé Laboy	PNP
At-large	Abel Nazario	PNP
At-large	Margarita Nolasco	PNP
At-large	Itzamar Peña	PNP
At-large	Thomas Rivera Schatz	PNP
At-large	Larry Seilhamer	PNP
At-large	Eduardo Bhatia	PPD
At-large	Rossana López León	PPD
At-large	Miguel Pereira	PPD
At-large	José Nadal Power	PPD
At-large	Cirilo Tirado	PPD
At-large	Aníbal José Torres	PPD
At-large	Miguel Pereira	PPD
At-large	Juan Dalmau	PIP
At-large	Vargas Vidot	Independent

== Non-officers ==
PNP
Post	Name	Political party
Secretary	Manuel A. Torres	PNP
Serjeant-at-Arms	Joel Fontánez González (Note: Senate (2013) "Rivera Schatz revalida como presidente del Senado")	PNP

== Committees ==
Name	President	Vice President	Secretary
Agriculture	Luis Berdiel Rivera	José Perez Rosa	Luis Daniel Muñiz
Appointments	Thomas Rivera Schatz	Carlos J. Rodríguez Mateo	Luis Berdiel Rivera
Banking, Commerce and Cooperativism	Eric Correa Rivera	Zoé Laboy Alvarado	Axel Roque
Consumer Affairs and Essential Public Services	Evelyn Vázquez Nieves	Luis Daniel Muñiz	Henry Neumann Zayas
Development of Community Initiatives	Vargas Vidot	Nayda Venegas	Eric Correa Rivera
Development of the South Central Region	Nelson Cruz Santiago	Luis Berdiel Rivera	Evelyn Vázquez Nieves
Education and University Reform	Abel Nazario	Luis Daniel Muñiz	Axel Roque
Electoral System of Puerto Rico	Miguel Laureano	Itzamar Peña Ramírez	Henry Neumann Zayas
Environmental Health and Natural Resources	Carlos J. Rodríguez Mateo	Luis Berdiel Rivera	Itzamar Peña Ramírez
Ethics and Public Integrity	Ángel Chayanne Martínez	Luis Berdiel Rivera	Migdalia Padilla Alvelo
Federal Relations, Politics and Economics	Thomas Rivera Schatz	Miguel Romero	Miguel Laureano
Government	Carlos J. Rodríguez Mateo	Migdalia Padilla Alvelo	Evelyn Vázquez Nieves
Health	Ángel Chayanne Martínez	Carlos J. Rodríguez Mateo	José Perez Rosa
Innovation, Telecommunication, Urbanism and Infrastructure	Miguel Laureano	Eric Correa Rivera	Axel Roque
Internal Affairs	Larry Seilhamer Rodríguez	Eric Correa Rivera	Margarita Nolasco Santiago
Municipal Matters	Margarita Nolasco	Itzamar Peña Ramírez	Miguel Romero
Public Safety	Henry Neumann Zayas	Zoé Laboy Alvarado	Luis Berdiel Rivera
Rules and Calendar	Carmelo Ríos Santiago	Axel Roque	Carlos J. Rodríguez Mateo
Social and Economical Revitalization	Zoé Laboy Alvarado	Migdalia Padilla Alvelo	Evelyn Vázquez Nieves
Social Welfare and Family Affairs	Nayda Venegas	José Perez Rosa	Margarita Nolasco
Tourism and Culture	José Perez Rosa	Evelyn Vázquez Nieves	Itzamar Peña Ramírez
Treasury	Migdalia Padilla Alvelo	Miguel Romero	Eric Correa Rivera
Veterans' Affairs	José Luis Dalmau	Zoé Laboy Alvarado	Carlos J. Rodríguez Mateo
Western Development	Luis Daniel Muñiz	Evelyn Vázquez Nieves	Zoé Laboy Alvarado
Women's Affairs	Itzamar Peña Ramírez	Migdalia Padilla Alvelo	Nayda Venegas
Youth, Recreation and Sports	Axel Roque	Henry Neumann Zayas	Nelson Cruz Santiago
