= 2018 United States Senate election in Florida =

- November 6, 2018
- Turnout: 62.6% ▼
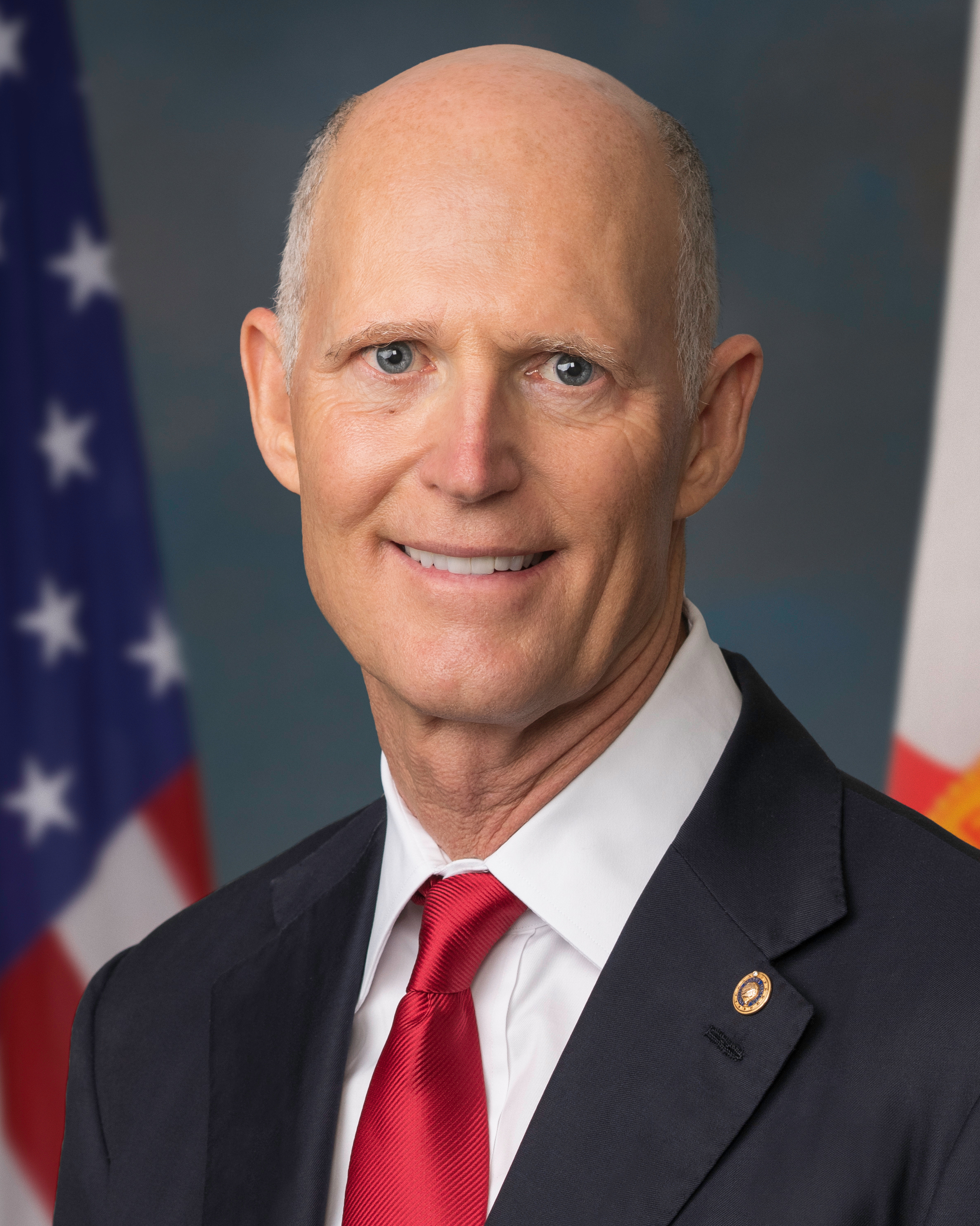

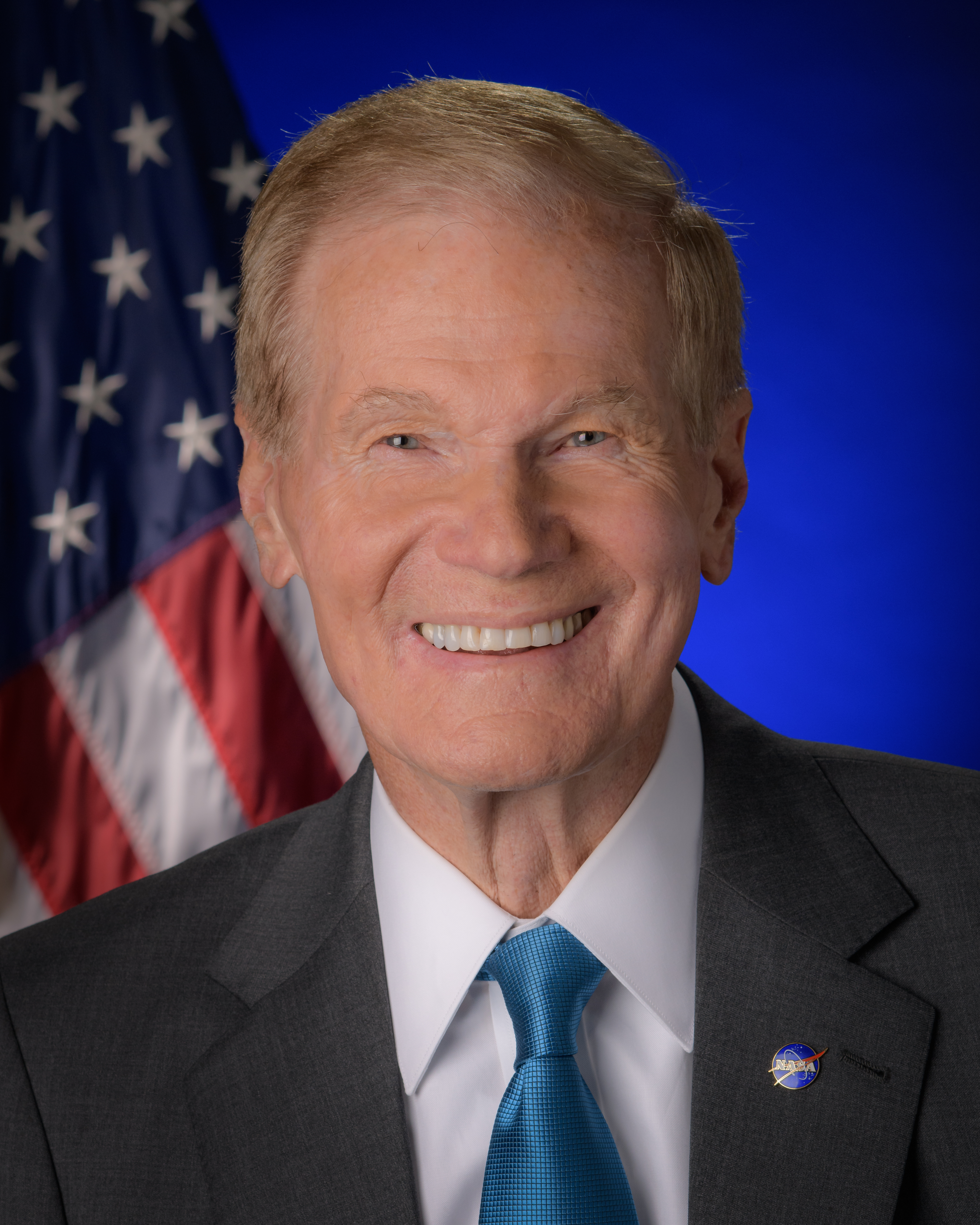
Nominee	Rick Scott	Bill Nelson
Party	Republican	Democratic
Popular vote	4,099,505	4,089,472
Percentage	50.05%	49.93%
- Scott: 50–60% 60–70% 70–80% 80–90% >90% Nelson: 50–60% 60–70% 70–80% 80–90% >90% Tie: 50% No data
U.S. senator before election
Bill Nelson
Democratic
Elected U.S. senator
Rick Scott
Republican

The 2018 United States Senate election in Florida was held on November 6, 2018, alongside a gubernatorial election, elections to the U.S. House of Representatives and other state and local elections. Incumbent Democratic Senator Bill Nelson ran for election to a fourth term, but was narrowly defeated by Republican Governor Rick Scott. The election still remains the closest U.S. Senate race in the state's history.

This was one of ten Democratic-held Senate seats up for election in a state won by Donald Trump in the 2016 presidential election. The results of the race were in dispute for 12 days following the election. The results showed that Nelson was narrowly trailing Scott, but the margin remained below 0.5%, triggering an automatic recount under Florida law. A controversial recount ensued, with both campaigns claiming irregularities.

Following the recount, Florida elections officials confirmed Scott's victory on November 18, 2018. Scott received 50.05% of the vote, while Nelson received 49.93%; the margin of victory was 10,033 votes out of 8.19 million votes cast, or 0.12%. Both in terms of raw vote margin and by percentage of difference, this was the closest Senate election in the 2018 cycle. Scott flipped 16 counties that Nelson had won in 2012, despite the favorable national environment for Democrats in 2018.

Scott's victory marked the first time since the Reconstruction era in 1875 that Republicans have held both Senate seats in Florida.

== Background ==
Incumbent Democratic Senator Bill Nelson sought re-election in the 2018 U.S. Senate election in Florida. The election was expected to be a key race in determining which party would control the U.S. Senate in 2019.

As of the second quarter of 2018, Nelson had a 44%–34% approval rating among his constituents. Despite having won re-election in 2012 by a 13% margin, Nelson was considered potentially vulnerable; he had been the only statewide elected Democrat in Florida since 2011, and his previous opponents, Connie Mack IV and Katherine Harris, were seen as much weaker challengers than Scott. Additionally, he was one of 10 incumbent Democratic senators running in states that had been carried by Donald Trump in 2016. Nelson was described as a "low-key centrist" that might not be able to energize progressive voters.

After being encouraged by President Trump to enter the Senate race, Republican governor of Florida Rick Scott announced his candidacy on April 9, 2018. As of the first quarter of 2018, Scott held a 54%–35% approval rating among his constituents, with a majority of Florida voters believing the state was moving in the right direction under Scott's administration. Republican President Donald Trump also held a positive approval rating of 49%–47% in Florida as of August 2018. Trump had won the state in 2016 by 1.2% over Democratic nominee Hillary Clinton. Scott had put more than $86 million of his own money into his successful 2010 and 2014 gubernatorial bids.

== Republican primary ==
The Republican primary was considered merely a formality, as Governor Scott's lone challenger was a perennial candidate who was running for Senate seats in eight other Republican primaries across the country. No other notable Republicans entered the race before or after Scott announced his candidacy.

=== Candidates ===
==== Nominee ====
- Rick Scott, incumbent governor of Florida

==== Eliminated in the primary ====
- Rocky De La Fuente, businessman and perennial candidate; American Delta and Reform nominee for president in 2016

==== Withdrew ====
- Virginia Fuller, registered nurse; Republican nominee for U.S. representative from CA-11 in 2012
- Alexander George, businessman, political activist, and minister; candidate for U.S. Senate in 2012
- Augustus Sol Invictus, far-right activist; candidate for U.S. Senate in 2016
- Lateresa Jones, life coach; Independent candidate for lieutenant governor in 2014 and U.S. Senate in 2016 (running as a write-in candidate)
- Martin Mikhail
- Mike Pompura
- Joseph Smith, chiropractor; candidate for U.S. Senate in 1988 and FL-19 in 1996; Republican nominee for FL-16 in 1988
- Marcia R. Thorne, pastor (ran as an independent)
- Angela Marie Walls-Windhauser, candidate for U.S. Senate in 2016 (ran as a write-in candidate)

==== Declined ====
- Jeff Atwater, Chief Financial Officer 2011–2017
- Carlos Beruff, real estate developer and Republican donor; candidate for U.S. Senate in 2016
- Pam Bondi, Attorney General since 2011
- Richard Corcoran, State Representative (District 37) since 2010; Speaker of the Florida House since 2016
- John Delaney, mayor of Jacksonville 1995–2003
- Ron DeSantis, U.S. representative from FL-6 2013–2018; candidate for U.S. Senate in 2016 (running for governor)
- Hulk Hogan, semi-retired professional wrestler, actor, television personality, entrepreneur, and musician
- David Jolly, U.S. representative from FL-13 2014–2017; candidate for U.S. Senate in 2016
- Carlos Lopez-Cantera, lieutenant governor since 2014; candidate for U.S. Senate in 2016
- Tom Rooney, U.S. representative from FL-17 since 2009

=== Polling ===
Poll source	Date(s) administered	Sample size	Margin of error	Rocky De La Fuente	Rick Scott	Undecided
Gravis Marketing	August 21–25, 2018	579	± 4.1%	12%	73%	15%
Gravis Marketing	August 21–22, 2018	321	± 5.5%	12%	73%	15%
Gravis Marketing	July 13–14, 2018	905	± 3.3%	16%	74%	10%

Hypothetical polling

Poll source	Date(s) administered	Sample size	Margin of error	Ron DeSantis	Augustus Sol Invictus	David Jolly	Carlos López-Cantera	Tom Rooney	Rick Scott	Marcia R. Thorne	Other	Undecided
Saint Leo University	November 19–24, 2017	166	–	–	1%	–	–	8%	54%	1%	4%	33%
Saint Leo University	November 27–30, 2016	138	–	3%	–	6%	3%	3%	41%	–	11%	33%

=== Results ===
County results Scott: 70–80%; 80–90%; 90–100%

Republican primary results
Party	Candidate	Votes	%
Republican	Rick Scott	1,456,187	88.61%
Republican	Rocky De La Fuente	187,209	11.39%
Total votes		1,643,396	100.00%

== Democratic primary ==
As both of Senator Nelson's primary opponents failed to qualify for the ballot, no Democratic primary was held.

=== Candidates ===
==== Nominee ====
- Bill Nelson, incumbent U.S. senator since 2001; U.S. representative from FL-11 1979–1991

==== Declined ====
- Randolph Bracy, State Senator (District 11) since 2016
- Tim Canova, law professor; candidate for FL-23 in 2016 (running for FL-23)
- Pam Keith, Navy veteran, labor attorney; candidate for U.S. Senate in 2016 (running for FL-18)

==== Failed to qualify ====
- Tamika Lyles
- Randy White

== Libertarian Party ==
=== Candidates ===
==== Withdrew ====
- Joe Wendt, janitor

==== Declined ====
- Augustus Sol Invictus, far-right activist; candidate for U.S. Senate in 2016 (ran as a Republican)
- Roger Stone, political consultant, lobbyist, and strategist

== American Independent Party ==
=== Candidates ===
==== Withdrew ====
- Ed Shoemaker, psychologist (ran for FL-15)

== Independents and write-ins ==
=== Candidates ===
==== Declared ====
- Lateresa Jones, life coach; candidate for lieutenant governor in 2014 and U.S. Senate in 2016 (write-in)
- Howard Knepper, businessman and real estate developer; candidate for president in 2012 (write-in)
- Michael S. Levinson, candidate for FL-13 in 2014 and the 2014 special election (write-in)
- Charles Frederick Tolbert, pastor (write-in)
- David Weeks (write-in)

==== Withdrew ====
- Edward Janowski
- Scott McCatty (write-in)
- Marcia R. Thorne, pastor
- Angela Marie Walls-Windhauser, Republican candidate for U.S. Senate in 2016 (write-in)

== General election ==
According to The Cook Political Report, the race was one of the 10 most competitive U.S. Senate races in the nation in 2018. It was also described as the most expensive U.S. Senate race in the country in 2018.

Scott's involvement in a large Medicare fraud case stirred controversy during the general election campaign. Scott responded with ads accusing Nelson of having cut Medicare benefits and stolen from Medicare; fact-checkers found that both of Scott's assertions were "mostly false." During the campaign, Scott characterize[s] Nelson as a "socialist"; PolitiFact described the assertion as "pants-on-fire" false.

Gun control was a key issue in this race. The election came less than nine months after the Stoneman Douglas High School shooting in Parkland. Nelson also mentioned the Orlando nightclub shooting that occurred in June 2016 and killed 49 people, asserting that "nothing was done" by Scott's administration. In the wake of Stoneman Douglas, Scott raised the age to purchase a gun from 18 to 21, set a three-day waiting period to purchase assault-style weapons, and banned bump stocks—moves that Nelson described as "doing the bare...minimum". The National Rifle Association of America opposed Scott's legislation.

Environmental issues also took on a prominent role in the race. Scott and his administration had been heavily criticized for weakening regulations designed to protect the environment, even going as far as to instruct the FDEP not to use the words "climate change" or "global warming" in official reports. Because of this, Scott was blamed for the state's worsening algae blooms, even being dubbed "Red Tide Rick" on social media. Scott blamed the toxic blooms on Nelson and on Congress' general inefficiency.

During the campaign, Scott sought to avoid mentioning President Trump and at times criticized or distanced himself from actions of the Trump administration. Prior to the campaign, he had used his friendship with Trump to boost his profile, had been an early and vocal supporter of Trump in 2016, and reportedly spoke to President Trump every one or two weeks. Trump endorsed Scott in his Senate bid.

Both Nelson's and Scott's responses to Hurricanes Irma and Michael (which made landfall in September 2017 and October 2018, respectively) were closely watched during the campaign season.

Scott made Nelson's age an issue in the campaign.

A 2024 study found that the confusing ballot design in Broward County, which flouted federal guidelines on ballot design, led approximately 25,000 voters to undervote in the 2018 Senate election. As the race was determined by less than 10,000 votes, some have speculated that the ballot design flaws contributed to the election outcome. However, the study concluded that this was unlikely to be the case.

=== Debates ===
- Complete video of debate, October 2, 2018

=== Endorsements ===
Rick Scott (R)

U.S. executive branch officials

- George W. Bush, 43rd president of the United States 2001–2009; governor of Texas 1995–2000
- Mike Pence, 48th vice president of the United States 2017–2021; governor of Indiana 2013–2017; U.S. representative from IN-6 2001–2013
- Donald Trump, 45th president of the United States 2017–2021

U.S. senators

- John Cornyn, U.S. senator from Texas 2002–present
- Joni Ernst, U.S. senator from Iowa 2015–present
- Cory Gardner, U.S. senator from Colorado 2015–2021; U.S. representative from CO-4 2011–2015
- Lindsey Graham, U.S. senator from South Carolina 2003–2026; U.S. representative from SC-3 1995–2003; candidate for president in 2016
- Mitch McConnell, Senate Majority Leader, U.S. senator from Kentucky 1985–present
- Marco Rubio, U.S. senator from Florida 2011–2026; candidate for president in 2016
- Tim Scott, U.S. senator from South Carolina 2013–present; U.S. representative from SC-1 2011–2013
- Todd Young, U.S. senator from Indiana 2017–present; U.S. representative from IN-9 2011–2017

U.S. representatives

- Ron DeSantis, U.S. representative from FL-6 2013–2018; Republican nominee for governor in 2018
- Mario Díaz-Balart, U.S. representative from FL-25 2003–present
- Neal Dunn, U.S. representative from FL-2 2017–present
- Luis Fortuño, resident commissioner of Puerto Rico 2005–2009; governor 2009–2013 (New Progressive)
- Matt Gaetz, U.S. representative from FL-1 2017–2024
- Jenniffer González, resident ccmmissioner of Puerto Rico 2017–2025
- Kevin McCarthy, House Majority Leader, U.S. representative from CA-23 2007–2023
- Carlos Romero Barceló, resident commissioner of Puerto Rico 1993–2001; governor 1977–1985; mayor of San Juan 1969–1977 (New Progressive)
- Francis Rooney, U.S. representative from FL-19 2017–2021

Governors

- Haley Barbour, governor of Mississippi 2004–2012; Republican nominee for U.S. Senate in 1982
- Jeb Bush, governor of Florida 1999–2007; candidate for president in 2016

Statewide and territorial officials

- Pam Bondi, Attorney General of Florida 2011–2019
- Jimmy Patronis, Chief Financial Officer of Florida 2017–2025
- Adam Putnam, Commissioner of Agriculture of Florida 2011-2019; U.S. representative from FL-12 2001–2011; candidate for governor in 2018
- Luis G. Rivera Marín, Secretary of State of Puerto Rico 2017–2019 (New Progressive)

State and territorial legislators

- José Aponte Hernández, territorial representative from Puerto Rico (at-large district) 2005–present (New Progressive)
- Ángel Bulerín, territorial representative from Puerto Rico (District 37) 1993–present (New Progressive)
- Matt Caldwell, state representative from Florida (District 79) 2010–present
- Richard Corcoran, state representative from Florida (District 37) 2010–present; Speaker of the Florida House 2016–present
- Eric Correa Rivera, territorial senator from Puerto Rico (District VIII) 2017–present (New Progressive)
- Daniel Davis, state representative from Florida (District 15) 2010–2014
- Nelson del Valle, territorial representative from Puerto Rico (District 9) 2005–2009 and 2017–present (New Progressive)
- Urayoán Hernández, territorial representative from Puerto Rico (District 26) 2013–present (New Progressive)
- José Kikito Meléndez, territorial representative from Puerto Rico (at-large district) 2011–present (New Progressive)
- Miguel Laureano, territorial senator from Puerto Rico (District VII) 2017–present (New Progressive)
- Yashira Lebrón Rodríguez, territorial representative from Puerto Rico (District 8) 2014–present (New Progressive)
- Carlos Johnny Méndez, territorial representative from Puerto Rico (District 36) 2005–present; Speaker of the Puerto Rico House 2017–present (New Progressive)
- María Milagros Charbonier, territorial representative from Puerto Rico (at-large district) 2013–present (New Progressive)
- Jorge Navarro Suárez, territorial representative from Puerto Rico (District 5) 2004–present (New Progressive)
- Henry Neumann, territorial senator from Puerto Rico (District I) 2017–2022 (New Progressive)
- Víctor Parés, territorial representative from Puerto Rico (District 4) 2012–2013 (New Progressive)
- María de Lourdes Ramos Rivera, territorial representative from Puerto Rico (at-large district) 2004–present (New Progressive)
- Thomas Rivera Schatz, president of the Senate of Puerto Rico 2009–2013 and 2017–present (New Progressive)
- Gabriel Rodríguez Aguiló, territorial representative from Puerto Rico (District 13) 2005–present (New Progressive)
- Pellé Santiago, territorial representative from Puerto Rico (District 10) 2013–present (New Progressive)
- Larry Seilhamer Rodríguez, vice president of the Senate of Puerto Rico 2017–2021 (New Progressive)
- Tony Soto, territorial representative from Puerto Rico (District 6) 2013–present (New Progressive)
- José Pichy Torres Zamora, territorial representative from Puerto Rico (at-large district) 2010–2013 and 2017–present (New Progressive)
- Nayda Venegas, territorial senator from Puerto Rico (District VIII) 2017–present (New Progressive)

Sheriffs

- Grady Judd, sheriff of Polk County 2005–present
- William Snyder, sheriff of Martin County 2013–present

Mayors

- Angelo Cruz Ramos, mayor of Ceiba, Puerto Rico 2013–present (New Progressive)
- Edwin García Feliciano, mayor of Camuy, Puerto Rico 2002–present (New Progressive)
- Rudy Giuliani, mayor of New York City, New York 1994–2001; candidate for U.S. Senate in 2000; candidate for president in 2008
- Noé Marcano, mayor of Naguabo, Puerto Rico 2013–present (New Progressive)
- Carlos Méndez Martínez, mayor of Aquadilla, Puerto Rico 1997–present (New Progressive)
- Carlos Molina, mayor of Arecibo, Puerto Rico 2013–present (New Progressive)
- Angel Pérez Otero, mayor of Guaynabo, Puerto Rico 2017–present (New Progressive)
- Ramón Luis Rivera Jr., mayor of Bayamón, Puerto Rico 2001–present (New Progressive)

Municipal officials

- Erick Erickson, Macon, Georgia city councilman 2007–2011

Individuals

- Charles R. Black Jr., chairman of Prime Policy Group
- Dan Bongino, conservative commentator and former Secret Service agent; candidate for FL-19 in 2016; Republican nominee for U.S. Senate from Maryland in 2012 and MD-6 in 2014
- Diamond and Silk, live-stream video bloggers, social media personalities, and political activists
- Kyle Kashuv, survivor of the Stoneman Douglas High School shooting and activist
- Jack Nicklaus, retired professional golfer
- Ryan Petty, school safety activist
- Andrew Pollack, school safety activist
- Hunter Pollack, school safety activist

Organizations

- Associated Builders and Contractors
- Club for Growth
- Florida Chamber of Commerce
- National Federation of Independent Business
- Republican Jewish Coalition
- United States Chamber of Commerce

Newspapers

- The Jewish Press
Bill Nelson (D)

U.S. executive branch officials

- Joe Biden, 46th president of the United States 2021–2025; 47th vice president of the United States 2009–2017; U.S. senator from Delaware 1973–2009; candidate for president in 1988 and in 2008
- Charles Bolden, administrator of NASA 2009–2017
- Barack Obama, 44th president of the United States 2009–2017; U.S. senator from Illinois 2005–2008
- Daniel B. Shapiro, U.S. Ambassador to Israel 2011–2017

U.S. senators

- Cory Booker, U.S. senator from New Jersey 2013–present; mayor of Newark 2006–2013
- Dick Durbin, U.S. senator from Illinois 1997–present; Senate Minority Whip, U.S. representative from IL-20 1983–1997
- Bob Graham, U.S. senator from Florida 1987–2005; governor 1979–1987; candidate for president in 2004
- Kamala Harris, 49th vice president of the United States 2021–2025; U.S. senator from California 2017–2021
- Doug Jones, U.S. senator from Alabama 2018–2021
- Jeff Merkley, U.S. senator from Oregon 2009–present
- Chuck Schumer, Senate Minority Leader, U.S. senator from New York
- Elizabeth Warren, U.S. senator from Massachusetts 2013–present

U.S. representatives

- Kathy Castor, U.S. representative from FL-14 2007–present
- Lois Frankel, U.S. representative from FL-21 2013–present
- Gwen Graham, U.S. representative from FL-2 2015–2017
- Stephanie Murphy, U.S. representative from FL-7 2017–2023
- Darren Soto, U.S. representative from FL-9 2017–present
- Nydia Velázquez, U.S. representative from NY-7 1993–present

Governors

- Alejandro García Padilla, governor of Puerto Rico 2013–2017 (Popular Democratic)
- Pedro Rosselló, governor of Puerto Rico 1993–2001 (New Progressive)
- Ricardo Rosselló, governor of Puerto Rico 2017–2019 (New Progressive)

Statewide and territorial officials

- Kenneth McClintock, Secretary of State of Puerto Rico 2009–2013

State legislators

- Shevrin D. Jones, state representative from Florida (District 101) 2012–present
- José Javier Rodríguez, state senator from Florida (District 37) 2016–present
- Carlos Guillermo Smith, state representative from Florida (District 49) 2016–present
- Vic Torres, state senator from Florida (District 15) 2016–present

Mayors

- Buddy Dyer, mayor of Orlando 2003–present
- Andrew Gillum, mayor of Tallahassee 2014–2018; Democratic nominee for governor in 2018
- Philip Levine, mayor of Miami Beach 2013–2017; candidate for governor in 2018
- María Meléndez, mayor of Ponce, Puerto Rico 2009–present (New Progressive)
- Carmen Yulín Cruz, mayor of San Juan, Puerto Rico 2013–present (Popular Democratic)

Other government officials

- Jon Leibowitz, chairman of the FTC 2009–2013

Individuals

- Jimmy Buffett, musician, songwriter, author, actor, and businessman
- Rosario Dawson, actress, producer, singer, comic book writer, and political activist
- America Ferrera, actress
- Jeff Greene, real estate entrepreneur; candidate for U.S. Senate in 2010 and governor in 2018
- Fred Guttenberg, activist against gun violence
- Mark Kelly, retired astronaut, engineer, and U.S. Navy Captain
- Eva Longoria, actress, producer, director, activist, and businesswoman
- Bette Midler, singer, songwriter, actress, comedian, and film producer
- Carolyn Porco, planetary scientist
- Gina Rodriguez, actress and activist
- Zoe Saldaña, actress and dancer
- Amy Schumer, stand-up comedian and actress
- Amy Siskind, activist and writer
- Barbra Streisand, singer, songwriter, actress, and filmmaker
- Donald Sussman, financier and philanthropist
- Gabrielle Union, actress, activist, and author

Organizations

- Alliance for Retired Americans
- American Federation of Teachers
- American Gastroenterological Association
- American Health Care Association
- American Hotel and Lodging Association
- American Institute of Certified Public Accountants
- American Seniors Housing Association
- American Trucking Associations
- Coalition to Stop Gun Violence
- End Citizens United
- Florida AFL–CIO
- Forward Together PAC
- International Brotherhood of Electrical Workers
- International Union of Painters and Allied Trades
- League of Conservation Voters
- Midwest Values PAC
- National Apartment Association
- National Association of Broadcasters
- National Association of Enrolled Agents
- National Association of Letter Carriers
- National Committee to Preserve Social Security and Medicare
- National Organization for Women
- Natural Resources Defense Council
- Planned Parenthood
- Service Employees International Union
- Sierra Club
- Transport Workers Union of America
- VoteVets.org

Newspapers

- La Gaceta
- Miami Herald
- Orlando Sentinel
- The Palm Beach Post
- Sun-Sentinel
- Tampa Bay Times
Declined to endorse

Newspapers

- Naples Daily News
- Pensacola News Journal

=== Predictions ===
Source	Ranking	As of
The Cook Political Report	Tossup	October 26, 2018
Inside Elections	Tilt D	November 1, 2018
Sabato's Crystal Ball	Lean D	November 5, 2018
NYT	Tossup	November 5, 2018
Fox News	Tossup	November 5, 2018
CNN	Tossup	November 5, 2018
RealClearPolitics	Tossup	November 5, 2018
Daily Kos	Tossup	November 5, 2018
Politico	Tossup	November 5, 2018
FiveThirtyEight	Lean D	November 5, 2018

=== Fundraising ===
Campaign finance reports as of October 17, 2018
Candidate (party)	Total receipts	Total disbursements	Cash on hand
Rick Scott (R)	$68,801,011	$66,496,248	$2,304,762
Bill Nelson (D) Incumbent	$28,294,713	$25,482,421	$3,806,614
Source: Federal Election Commission

=== Polling ===
Poll source	Date(s) administered	Sample size	Margin of error	Bill Nelson (D)	Rick Scott (R)	Other	Undecided
The Trafalgar Group (R)	November 4–5, 2018	1,484	± 2.5%	47%	49%	–	4%
HarrisX	November 3–5, 2018	600	± 4.0%	48%	48%	–	–
St. Pete Polls	November 3–4, 2018	3,088	± 1.8%	50%	46%	–	4%
HarrisX	November 2–4, 2018	600	± 4.0%	45%	49%	–	–
Quinnipiac University	October 29 – November 4, 2018	1,142	± 3.5%	51%	44%	0%	5%
Emerson College	November 1–3, 2018	784	± 3.7%	50%	45%	3%	3%
HarrisX	November 1–3, 2018	600	± 4.0%	45%	47%	–	–
Research Co.	November 1–3, 2018	450	± 4.6%	47%	46%	–	7%
Change Research (D-Reason to Believe PAC)	November 1–2, 2018	1,236	–	50%	48%	–	–
St. Pete Polls	November 1–2, 2018	2,733	± 1.9%	48%	49%	–	3%
HarrisX	October 31 – November 2, 2018	600	± 4.0%	46%	48%	–	–
Marist College	October 30 – November 2, 2018	595 LV	± 5.0%	50%	46%	<1%	4%
Marist College	October 30 – November 2, 2018	917 RV	± 4.1%	50%	45%	<1%	5%
Gravis Marketing	October 29 – November 2, 2018	753	± 3.6%	50%	47%	–	4%
HarrisX	October 30 – November 1, 2018	600	± 4.0%	45%	50%	–	–
St. Pete Polls	October 30–31, 2018	2,470	± 2.0%	49%	47%	–	3%
Targoz Market Research	October 28–31, 2018	558	–	45%	49%	–	6%
HarrisX	October 29–31, 2018	600	± 4.0%	45%	48%	–	–
MWR Research/Consumer Energy Alliance (Note: The Consumer Energy Alliance is a pro-Keystone XL lobbying group.)	October 25–31, 2020	1,005	–	41%	43%	–	17% (Note: Includes "Refused")
The Trafalgar Group (R)	October 29–30, 2018	2,543	± 1.9%	49%	47%	–	4%
Vox Populi Polling	October 27–30, 2018	696	± 3.7%	50%	50%	–	–
HarrisX	October 24–30, 2018	1,400	± 2.6%	43%	44%	–	–
Cygnal (R)	October 27–29, 2018	495	± 4.4%	50%	48%	–	2%
CNN/SSRS	October 24–29, 2018	781 LV	± 4.3%	49%	47%	0%	2%
CNN/SSRS	October 24–29, 2018	887 RV	± 4.0%	46%	46%	0%	5%
Suffolk University	October 25–28, 2018	500	± 4.4%	45%	43%	–	10%
NYT Upshot/Siena College	October 23–27, 2018	737	± 4.0%	48%	44%	–	8%
University of North Florida	October 23–26, 2018	1,051	± 3.0%	47%	46%	<1%	7%
YouGov	October 23–26, 2018	991	± 4.0%	46%	46%	1%	6%
Ipsos	October 17–25, 2018	1,069	± 3.4%	49%	44%	3%	4%
Gravis Marketing	October 22–23, 2018	773	± 3.5%	49%	45%	–	6%
Strategic Research Associates	October 16–23, 2018	800	± 3.5%	46%	45%	–	9%
Saint Leo University	October 16–22, 2018	698	± 3.5%	47%	38%	6%	9%
St. Pete Polls	October 20–21, 2018	1,575	± 2.5%	48%	49%	–	3%
Florida Atlantic University	October 18–21, 2018	704	± 3.6%	41%	42%	4%	13%
SurveyUSA	October 18–21, 2018	665	± 5.0%	49%	41%	4%	6%
Quinnipiac University	October 17–21, 2018	1,161	± 3.5%	52%	46%	0%	2%
Schroth, Eldon and Associates (D)	October 17–20, 2018	600	± 4.0%	45%	47%	–	9%
CNN/SSRS	October 16–20, 2018	759 LV	± 4.2%	50%	45%	0%	3%
CNN/SSRS	October 16–20, 2018	872 RV	± 3.9%	49%	45%	0%	4%
OnMessage Inc. (R-Scott)	October 14–18, 2018	2,200	± 2.1%	46%	51%	–	3%
St. Pete Polls	October 15–16, 2018	1,974	± 2.2%	47%	49%	–	4%
Florida Southern College	October 1–5, 2018	476	± 4.5%	44%	46%	6%	4%
Kaiser Family Foundation/SSRS	September 19 – October 2, 2018	522	± 6.0%	48%	45%	1%	6%
St. Pete Polls	September 29–30, 2018	2,313	± 2.0%	47%	47%	–	6%
Public Policy Polling (D-Protect Our Care)	September 28–30, 2018	779	± 3.5%	48%	44%	–	9%
Strategic Research Associates	September 17–30, 2018	800	± 3.5%	45%	44%	–	11%
Mason-Dixon	September 24–27, 2018	815	± 3.5%	47%	46%	–	7%
Quinnipiac University	September 20–24, 2018	888	± 4.0%	53%	46%	0%	1%
Cherry Communications	September 19–24, 2018	622	± 4.4%	48%	46%	–	–
Marist College	September 16–20, 2018	600 LV	± 4.7%	48%	45%	1%	6%
Marist College	September 16–20, 2018	829 RV	± 4.0%	48%	43%	1%	7%
University of North Florida	September 17–19, 2018	603	–	45%	45%	1%	9%
Florida Atlantic University	September 13–16, 2018	850	± 3.3%	41%	42%	5%	11%
Ipsos	September 5–12, 2018	1,000	± 4.0%	45%	46%	4%	6%
Rasmussen Reports	September 10–11, 2018	800	± 3.5%	45%	44%	5%	6%
SurveyUSA	September 7–9, 2018	634	± 5.3%	44%	46%	4%	7%
Quinnipiac University	August 30 – September 3, 2018	785	± 4.3%	49%	49%	0%	2%
Gravis Marketing	August 29–30, 2018	1,225	± 2.8%	47%	47%	–	6%
Public Policy Polling (D-EDGE Comms.)	August 29–30, 2018	743	± 4.0%	46%	45%	–	8%
St. Pete Polls	August 29–30, 2018	1,755	± 2.3%	47%	47%	–	5%
Florida Atlantic University	August 16–20, 2018	800	± 3.4%	39%	45%	–	17%
Saint Leo University	August 10–16, 2018	500	± 4.5%	36%	40%	8%	15%
Mason-Dixon	July 24–25, 2018	625	± 4.0%	44%	47%	–	9%
Florida Atlantic University	July 20–21, 2018	800	± 3.4%	40%	44%	–	17%
Gravis Marketing	July 13–14, 2018	1,840	± 2.3%	47%	43%	–	10%
SurveyMonkey/Axios	June 11 – July 2, 2018	1,080	± 5.0%	46%	49%	–	5%
YouGov	June 19–22, 2018	839 LV	–	41%	46%	6%	6%
YouGov	June 19–22, 2018	996 RV	± 3.5%	40%	42%	6%	9%
Marist College	June 17–21, 2018	947	± 3.9%	49%	45%	1%	5%
Public Policy Polling (D-EDGE Comms.)	June 18–19, 2018	1,308	± 3.2%	48%	46%	–	7%
Gravis Marketing	May 31 – June 15, 2018	1,251	± 2.8%	50%	40%	–	10%
Cherry Communications	May 25 – June 4, 2018	605	± 4.0%	45%	48%	–	5%
Saint Leo University	May 25–31, 2018	506	± 4.5%	34%	40%	8%	18%
Morning Consult	May 29–30, 2018	1,199	± 3.0%	39%	40%	–	–
Florida Atlantic University	May 4–7, 2018	728 LV	–	45%	45%	–	–
Florida Atlantic University	May 4–7, 2018	1,000 RV	± 3.0%	40%	44%	–	16%
Public Policy Polling (D-Levine)	April 10–11, 2018	661	± 3.9%	50%	44%	–	6%
Gravis Marketing	February 26 – March 19, 2018	2,212	± 2.1%	44%	40%	–	16%
McLaughlin & Associates (R-NR PAC)	March 10–13, 2018	800	± 3.4%	46%	47%	–	6%
Clearview Research	March 1–7, 2018	750	± 3.6%	41%	43%	–	16%
SurveyMonkey/Axios	February 12 – March 5, 2018	1,806	± 5.0%	53%	43%	–	4%
Quinnipiac University	February 23–26, 2018	1,156	± 3.6%	46%	42%	2%	9%
Florida Atlantic University	February 23–25, 2018	800	± 3.6%	40%	38%	–	22%
Saint Leo University	February 18–24, 2018	500	± 4.5%	35%	42%	9%	15%
Big Data Poll	February 17–18, 2018	910	± 3.0%	37%	39%	8%	15%
Gravis Marketing	February 1–18, 2018	1,978	± 2.2%	44%	40%	–	16%
Florida Atlantic University	February 1–4, 2018	750	± 3.7%	34%	44%	–	22%
University of North Florida	January 29 – February 4, 2018	429	± 4.7%	48%	42%	2%	7%
Mason-Dixon	January 30 – February 1, 2018	625	± 4.0%	45%	44%	–	11%
Dixie Strategies	January 9–10, 2018	785	± 3.5%	38%	35%	–	27%
Gravis Marketing	December 19–24, 2017	5,778	± 1.3%	44%	39%	–	17%
Saint Leo University	November 19–24, 2017	500	± 4.5%	32%	42%	8%	18%
Mason-Dixon	October 17–19, 2017	625	± 4.0%	44%	44%	–	12%
University of North Florida	October 11–17, 2017	706	± 3.4%	37%	36%	7%	20%
Cherry Communications	September 17–24, 2017	615	± 4.0%	45%	47%	–	8%
Saint Leo University	September 10–16, 2017	500	± 4.5%	33%	35%	11%	21%
Florida Atlantic University	August 24–26, 2017	800	± 4.0%	42%	40%	–	18%
Gravis Marketing	April 4–10, 2017	1,243	± 2.8%	56%	28%	–	16%
Gravis Marketing	March 28–29, 2017	1,453	± 2.6%	52%	37%	–	12%
Cherry Communications	March 6–14, 2017	600	± 4.0%	48%	42%	–	10%
Saint Leo University	March 3–11, 2017	507	± 4.5%	39%	34%	10%	17%
Public Opinion Strategies (R-FHA)	March 1–5, 2017	600	± 4.0%	46%	44%	–	10%
Mason-Dixon	February 24–28, 2017	625	± 4.0%	46%	41%	–	13%
University of North Florida	February 13–26, 2017	957	± 3.1%	44%	38%	3%	12%
Gravis Marketing	November 22–25, 2016	3,250	± 2.4%	51%	38%	–	11%
Public Policy Polling	September 4–6, 2016	744	± 3.6%	45%	41%	–	14%
Public Policy Polling	September 11–13, 2015	814	± 3.4%	46%	42%	–	12%
Public Policy Polling	March 19–22, 2015	923	± 3.2%	47%	43%	–	10%

Hypothetical polling

with Pam Bondi

Poll source	Date(s) administered	Sample size	Margin of error	Bill Nelson (D)	Pam Bondi (R)	Undecided
Gravis Marketing	November 22–25, 2016	3,250	± 2.4%	50%	35%	15%

=== Initial results and recount ===
The results of the race were in dispute for 12 days following the election. Because Scott's lead over Nelson was less than 0.5% of the vote, an automatic recount was triggered under Florida law. A controversial recount ensued, with both campaigns claiming irregularities.

Nelson and Scott traded accusations of voter suppression and voter fraud. Two lawsuits were filed by the Scott campaign after the election against the Supervisor of Elections in both Palm Beach and Broward Counties while the Nelson campaign filed one against the secretary of state in Florida. On November 9, the Scott campaign won both of its lawsuits. Notably, election officials in Broward County had to receive police protection after accusations of voter fraud were made by a few members of Congress.

Additionally, a number of mail-in ballots were found in a mail distribution center in the city of Opa-locka three days after the election. The Miami-Dade Elections Department considered the votes uncountable because they had not arrived at the department by the time the polls closed.

The deadline for all ballots to be machine-counted was 3:00 pm EST on Thursday, November 15, 2018. The revised totals triggered a statewide hand-recount of rejected ballots. At least three counties (Broward, Hillsborough, and Palm Beach County) missed the deadline. During machine counting, 846 votes from Hillsborough County were lost, presumably due to a power outage. Machines purchased from Sequoia Voting Systems broke down, creating delays in the count of Palm Beach County votes.

=== Results ===
Florida elections officials announced on November 18, 2018, that Scott had prevailed. Scott received 50.05% of the vote, while Nelson received 49.93%; the margin of victory was 10,033 votes out of 8.19 million votes cast. Nelson then conceded the race to Scott.

United States Senate election in Florida, 2018
Party	Candidate	Votes	%	±%
Republican	Rick Scott	4,099,505	50.05%	+7.82%
Democratic	Bill Nelson (incumbent)	4,089,472	49.93%	−5.30%
Write-in		1,028	0.01%	N/A
Total votes		8,190,005	100.00%	N/A
Republican gain from Democratic				

==== By county ====
County	Rick Scott Republican		Bill Nelson Democratic		Write-ins		Margin		Total votes cast
County	#	%	#	%	#	%	#	%	Total votes cast
Alachua	40,599	35.27%	74,493	64.71%	20	0.02%	-33,894	-29.44%	115,112
Baker	8,579	81.51%	1,945	18.48%	1	0.01%	6,634	63.03%	10,525
Bay	46,681	73.62%	16,723	26.37%	7	0.01%	29,958	47.25%	63,411
Bradford	7,576	72.46%	2,879	27.53%	1	0.01%	4,697	44.93%	10,456
Brevard	160,305	56.95%	121,112	43.03%	56	0.02%	39,193	13.92%	281,473
Broward	211,397	30.92%	472,239	69.08%	0	0.00%	-260,842	-38.16%	683,636
Calhoun	3,586	77.64%	1,033	22.36%	0	0.00%	2,533	55.28%	4,619
Charlotte	52,916	61.20%	33,525	38.78%	16	0.02%	19,391	22.42%	86,457
Citrus	48,008	67.92%	22,660	32.06%	15	0.02%	25,348	25.86%	70,683
Clay	65,639	70.30%	27,718	29.69%	11	0.01%	37,921	40.61%	93,368
Collier	101,266	65.06%	54,390	34.94%	6	0.00%	46,876	30.12%	155,662
Columbia	17,234	69.65%	7,505	30.33%	6	0.02%	9,729	39.32%	24,745
Desoto	5,503	62.31%	3,328	37.69%	0	0.00%	2,175	24.62%	8,831
Dixie	4,442	77.06%	1,322	22.94%	0	0.00%	3,120	54.12%	5,764
Duval	185,904	49.14%	192,381	50.85%	45	0.01%	-6,477	-1.71%	378,330
Escambia	75,947	58.94%	52,891	41.05%	17	0.01%	23,056	17.89%	128,855
Flagler	31,467	59.49%	21,419	40.49%	11	0.02%	10,048	19.00%	52,897
Franklin	3,404	62.86%	2,011	37.14%	0	0.00%	1,393	25.72%	5,415
Gadsden	6,051	30.26%	13,945	69.74%	1	0.01%	-7,894	-39.48%	19,997
Gilchrist	5,703	77.74%	1,633	22.26%	0	0.00%	4,070	55.48%	7,336
Glades	2,666	69.74%	1,156	30.24%	1	0.03%	1,510	39.50%	3,823
Gulf	4,321	73.22%	1,580	26.78%	0	0.00%	2,741	46.44%	5,901
Hamilton	2,856	63.09%	1,671	36.91%	0	0.00%	1,185	26.18%	4,527
Hardee	4,455	69.93%	1,916	30.07%	0	0.00%	2,539	39.86%	6,371
Hendry	5,304	59.96%	3,542	40.04%	0	0.00%	1,762	19.92%	8,846
Hernando	49,501	61.64%	30,798	38.35%	14	0.02%	18,703	23.29%	80,313
Highlands	26,282	66.22%	13,398	33.76%	6	0.02%	12,884	32.46%	39,686
Hillsborough	239,641	45.96%	281,661	54.02%	72	0.01%	-42,020	-8.06%	521,374
Holmes	5,919	87.37%	856	12.63%	0	0.00%	5,063	74.74%	6,775
Indian River	44,798	60.53%	29,195	39.45%	11	0.01%	15,603	21.08%	74,004
Jackson	10,791	67.55%	5,182	32.44%	1	0.01%	5,609	35.11%	15,974
Jefferson	3,699	50.48%	3,626	49.49%	2	0.03%	73	0.99%	7,327
Lafayette	2,195	77.89%	623	22.11%	0	0.00%	1,572	55.78%	2,818
Lake	93,537	60.36%	61,402	39.63%	15	0.01%	32,135	20.73%	154,954
Lee	174,316	60.27%	114,857	39.71%	41	0.01%	59,459	20.56%	289,214
Leon	48,767	34.86%	91,097	65.12%	34	0.02%	-42,330	-30.26%	139,898
Levy	11,658	68.66%	5,319	31.33%	3	0.02%	6,339	37.33%	16,980
Liberty	2,076	76.66%	632	23.34%	0	0.00%	1,444	53.32%	2,708
Madison	4,184	54.99%	3,425	45.01%	0	0.00%	759	9.98%	7,609
Manatee	94,390	57.80%	68,877	42.18%	28	0.02%	25,513	15.62%	163,295
Marion	95,592	61.81%	59,025	38.16%	44	0.03%	36,567	23.65%	154,661
Martin	46,733	60.35%	30,691	39.63%	12	0.02%	16,042	20.72%	77,436
Miami-Dade	316,020	39.43%	485,496	60.57%	31	0.00%	-169,476	-21.14%	801,547
Monroe	18,035	49.97%	18,051	50.02%	4	0.01%	-16	-0.05%	36,090
Nassau	31,795	73.09%	11,703	26.90%	3	0.01%	20,092	46.19%	43,501
Okaloosa	60,924	72.66%	22,902	27.31%	19	0.02%	38,022	45.35%	83,845
Okeechobee	7,727	68.84%	3,496	31.15%	1	0.01%	4,231	37.69%	11,224
Orange	180,763	38.04%	294,308	61.94%	70	0.01%	-113,545	-23.90%	475,141
Osceola	47,898	41.64%	67,123	58.35%	8	0.01%	-19,225	-16.71%	115,029
Palm Beach	244,850	41.58%	344,008	58.42%	36	0.01%	-99,158	-16.84%	588,894
Pasco	121,212	57.53%	89,447	42.45%	51	0.02%	31,765	15.08%	210,710
Pinellas	205,935	47.37%	228,712	52.60%	127	0.03%	-22,777	-5.23%	434,774
Polk	138,751	56.74%	105,748	43.24%	45	0.02%	33,003	13.50%	244,544
Putnam	18,689	66.66%	9,344	33.33%	5	0.01%	9,345	33.33%	28,038
Santa Rosa	56,374	74.74%	19,047	25.25%	10	0.01%	37,327	49.49%	75,431
Sarasota	113,585	53.94%	96,973	46.05%	35	0.02%	16,612	7.89%	210,593
Seminole	97,457	48.98%	101,504	51.01%	31	0.02%	-4,047	-2.03%	198,992
St. Johns	85,031	65.07%	45,638	34.92%	12	0.01%	39,393	30.15%	130,681
St. Lucie	59,612	48.22%	63,978	51.75%	34	0.03%	-4,366	-3.53%	123,624
Sumter	52,868	70.92%	21,678	29.08%	3	0.00%	31,190	41.84%	74,549
Suwannee	11,842	74.53%	4,044	25.45%	2	0.01%	7,798	49.08%	15,888
Taylor	5,638	71.36%	2,263	28.64%	0	0.00%	3,375	42.72%	7,901
Union	3,650	75.30%	1,197	24.70%	0	0.00%	2,453	50.60%	4,847
Volusia	125,762	55.02%	102,819	44.98%	0	0.00%	22,943	10.04%	228,581
Wakulla	9,322	65.69%	4,868	34.31%	0	0.00%	4,454	31.38%	14,190
Walton	22,776	75.26%	7,485	24.73%	4	0.01%	15,291	50.53%	30,265
Washington	7,101	78.38%	1,959	21.62%	0	0.00%	5,142	56.76%	9,060
Total	4,099,505	50.05%	4,089,472	49.93%	1,028	0.01%	10,033	0.12%	8,190,005

Counties that flipped from Democratic to Republican

- Brevard (largest municipality: Palm Bay)
- Flagler (largest municipality: Palm Coast)
- Franklin (largest municipality: Eastpoint)
- Hamilton (largest municipality: Jasper)
- Hendry (largest municipality: Clewiston)
- Hernando (largest municipality: Spring Hill)
- Jefferson (largest municipality: Monticello)
- Liberty (largest municipality: Bristol)
- Madison (largest municipality: Madison)
- Manatee (largest municipality: Bradenton)
- Marion (largest municipality: Ocala)
- Okeechobee (largest municipality: Okeechobee)
- Pasco (largest municipality: Wesley Chapel)
- Polk (largest municipality: Lakeland)
- Sarasota (largest municipality: North Port)
- Volusia (largest municipality: Deltona)

==== By congressional district ====
Scott won 14 of 27 congressional districts.

District	Nelson	Scott	Representative
1st	32%	68%	Matt Gaetz
2nd	35%	65%	Neal Dunn
3rd	45%	55%	Ted Yoho
4th	38%	62%	John Rutherford
5th	65%	35%	Al Lawson
6th	43%	57%	Ron DeSantis
6th	43%	57%	Mike Waltz
7th	55%	45%	Stephanie Murphy
8th	42%	58%	Bill Posey
9th	54%	46%	Darren Soto
10th	63%	37%	Val Demings
11th	35%	65%	Daniel Webster
12th	44%	56%	Gus Bilirakis
13th	55%	45%	Charlie Crist
14th	59%	41%	Kathy Castor
15th	46%	54%	Dennis Ross
15th	46%	54%	Ross Spano
16th	46%	54%	Vern Buchanan
17th	38%	62%	Tom Rooney
17th	38%	62%	Greg Steube
18th	48%	52%	Brian Mast
19th	38%	62%	Francis Rooney
20th	82%	18%	Alcee Hastings
21st	61%	39%	Lois Frankel
22nd	60%	40%	Ted Deutch
23rd	64%	36%	Debbie Wasserman Schultz
24th	83%	17%	Frederica Wilson
25th	42%	58%	Mario Díaz-Balart
26th	54%	46%	Carlos Curbelo
26th	54%	46%	Debbie Mucarsel-Powell
27th	56%	44%	Ileana Ros-Lehtinen
27th	56%	44%	Donna Shalala

== Analysis ==
=== Edison Research exit poll ===
Demographic subgroup	Nelson	Scott	No answer	% of voters
Gender
Men	42	58	N/A	45
Women	57	43	N/A	55
Age
18–24 years old	62	38	N/A	5
25–29 years old	73	27	N/A	5
30–39 years old	62	38	N/A	10
40–49 years old	49	51	N/A	12
50–64 years old	50	50	N/A	31
65 and older	43	57	N/A	37
Race
White	40	60	N/A	66
Black	90	10	N/A	13
Latino	54	46	N/A	15
Asian	N/A	N/A	N/A	2
Other	67	33	N/A	4
Race by gender
White men	32	68	N/A	31
White women	47	53	N/A	35
Black men	88	12	N/A	6
Black women	91	9	N/A	8
Latino men	49	51	N/A	6
Latina women	58	42	N/A	9
Others	66	34	N/A	5
Education
High school or less	47	53	N/A	20
Some college education	51	49	N/A	25
Associate degree	47	53	N/A	15
Bachelor's degree	48	52	N/A	24
Advanced degree	58	42	N/A	16
Education and race
White college graduates	47	53	N/A	28
White no college degree	35	65	N/A	38
Non-white college graduates	64	36	N/A	12
Non-white no college degree	74	26	N/A	22
Whites by education and gender
White women with college degrees	58	42	N/A	13
White women without college degrees	40	60	N/A	22
White men with college degrees	37	63	N/A	14
White men without college degrees	27	73	N/A	17
Non-whites	70	30	N/A	34
Income
Under $30,000	62	38	N/A	19
$30,000–49,999	53	47	N/A	22
$50,000–99,999	51	49	N/A	34
$100,000–199,999	48	52	N/A	19
Over $200,000	N/A	N/A	N/A	7
Party ID
Democrats	92	8	N/A	33
Republicans	9	91	N/A	37
Independents	55	45	N/A	30
Party by gender
Democratic men	90	10	N/A	12
Democratic women	93	7	N/A	21
Republican men	7	93	N/A	19
Republican women	11	89	N/A	18
Independent men	50	50	N/A	14
Independent women	60	40	N/A	16
Ideology
Liberals	89	11	N/A	22
Moderates	62	38	N/A	39
Conservatives	15	85	N/A	39
Marital status
Married	43	57	N/A	64
Unmarried	59	41	N/A	36
Gender by marital status
Married men	36	64	N/A	32
Married women	50	50	N/A	31
Unmarried men	48	52	N/A	14
Unmarried women	62	38	N/A	22
First-time midterm election voter
Yes	58	42	N/A	16
No	47	53	N/A	84
Most important issue facing the country
Health care	75	25	N/A	41
Immigration	17	83	N/A	29
Economy	28	72	N/A	16
Gun policy	76	24	N/A	11
Area type
Urban	56	44	N/A	42
Suburban	47	53	N/A	50
Rural	37	63	N/A	8
Source: CNN

== See also ==
- 2018 United States Senate elections
- 2018 Florida gubernatorial election
