= Senator Rivera =

Senator Rivera may refer to:

- Cirilo Tirado Rivera (born 1964), Senate of Puerto Rico
- Eric Correa Rivera (born 1975), Senate of Puerto Rico
- George Rivera (born 1948), Colorado State Senate
- Gustavo Rivera (politician) (born 1975), New York State Senate
- Luis A. Berdiel Rivera (born 1962), Senate of Puerto Rico
- Luis Daniel Rivera (politician), Senate of Puerto Rico
- Luis Muñoz Rivera (senator) (1916–2006), Senate of Puerto Rico
- Luis Padrón Rivera (1892–1960), Senate of Puerto Rico
