= Hunter Pollack =

American school safety activist and political advisor

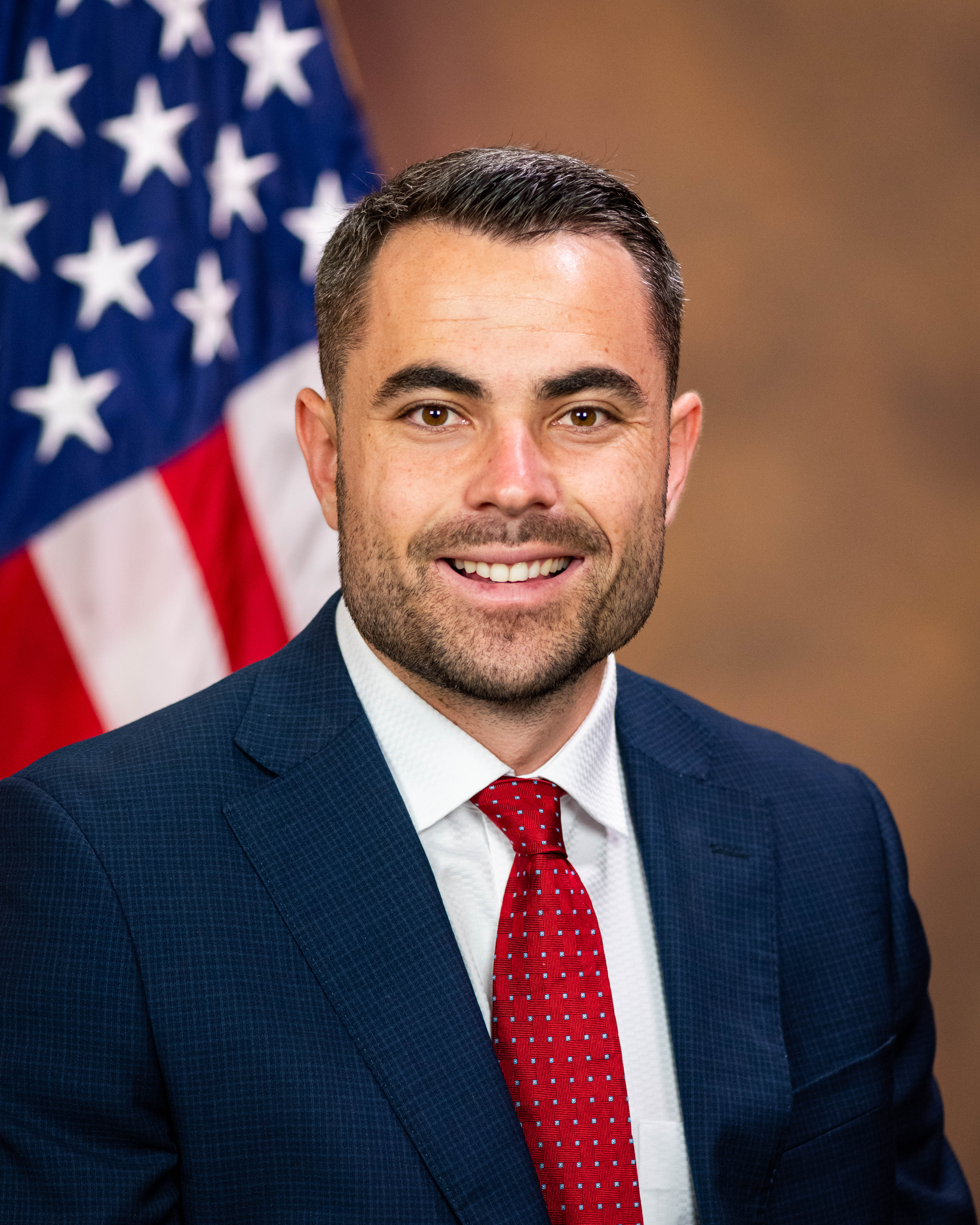
- Pollack in 2025
- Born: August 6, 1997 (age 28); Long Island, New York, U.S.
- Education: Marjory Stoneman Douglas High School; Florida State University (BA); Florida State University College of Law (JD)
- Movement: Meadow's Movement
- Father: Andrew Pollack
- Relatives: Meadow Pollack (sister)

Hunter Pollack (born August 6, 1997) is an American attorney, political advisor, and school safety activist, whose younger sister, Meadow, was murdered in the Stoneman Douglas High School shooting in 2018. He is the son of Shara Kaplan and Andrew Pollack. Hunter is Jewish.

== Career and activism ==
Hunter was invited to a White House listening session a week after the Stoneman Douglas shooting that was hosted by President Donald Trump, where his father expressed the need for increased safety measures in schools rather than focusing on gun control. Pollack was credited to the passing of the Marjory Stoneman Douglas Safety Act (Florida Senate Bill: 7026), has met personally with President Trump and Vice President Pence, and Governor Rick Scott.

Pollack interned in the office of Florida Attorney General Pam Bondi from May 2018 to August 2018. The following year, Pollack worked with Governor Rick Scott's Senate campaign and Ron DeSantis first gubernatorial race as well as serving on the governor’s transition advisory committee on public safety.

In conjunction with his father Andrew Pollack and other victims families members, Pollack was credited to helping form the Federal Commission on School Safety under President Trump.

Pollack worked for the Trump administration in the Office of the Associate Attorney General in the United States Department of Justice in 2025. He then transitioned to United States Department of Homeland Security the following year in May 2026.

== March for Our Lives event controversy ==
Pollack said he was prevented from reading a speech at the March for Our Lives event after being misled by event officials. David Hogg tweeted a video of Hunter reading his speech at the Ride for Meadow event, and blamed the omission on a logistical issue. Ryan Deitsch denied any political reason for the omission and stated that Hunter decided not to attend the march, which Hunter disputes. Key organizers in the march were criticized for not including other points of view.
