= Edgar R. Anderson Jr. =

United States general (born 1940)

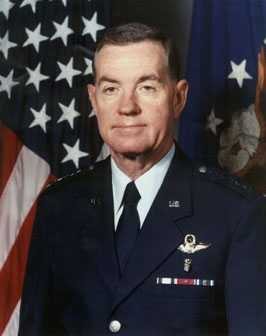

15th Surgeon General of the United States Air Force
- In office September 1994 – November 1996
- Preceded by: Robert A. Buethe (acting)
- Succeeded by: Charles H. Roadman II

Personal details
- Born: March 13, 1940 (age 86) Baton Rouge, Louisiana, U.S.
- Died: January 23, 2026
- Spouse: Sandra Donnell Klutz (m. 1969; died 2025)
- Children: 3
- Awards: Legion of Merit (2); Distinguished Flying Cross (2); Air Medal (10)
- Nickname: "Andy"

Military service
- Allegiance: United States
- Branch/service: United States Air Force
- Years of service: 1965–1997
- Rank: Lieutenant General
- Commands: Surgeon General of the United States Air Force; Wilford Hall Medical Center

Lieutenant General (Dr.) Edgar Ratcliffe Anderson Jr. (born March 13, 1940) was the 15th Surgeon General of the United States Air Force, Headquarters U.S. Air Force, Bolling Air Force Base, Washington D.C.

== Biography ==
Born in Baton Rouge, Louisiana, Anderson entered the Air Force in March 1965 after receiving his medical degree from Louisiana State University, New Orleans. He is board certified in family practice, dermatology and aerospace medicine. He has commanded Air Force hospitals of all sizes and been a command surgeon. He is a command pilot, a former medical test pilot, chief flight surgeon and basic parachutist with 2,200 flying hours, principally in fighter aircraft. He retired from the Air Force on January 1, 1997.

== Education ==
- 1964 Medical degree, Louisiana State University, New Orleans
- 1972 Industrial College of the Armed Forces
- 1980 Residency in dermatology, Wilford Hall Medical Center, Lackland Air Force Base, Texas
- 1982 Air War College

== Assignments ==
- March 1965 – July 1965, entered the Air Force through direct commission
- July 1965 – September 1965, student, aerospace medicine, Brooks Air Force Base, Texas
- September 1965 – September 1968, flight surgeon, 464th Tactical Airlift Wing, Pope Air Force Base, North Carolina
- September 1968 – December 1969, chief of aerospace medicine, 33rd Tactical Fighter Wing, Eglin Air Force Base, Florida
- December 1969 – March 1971, undergraduate and graduate pilot training, Williams Air Force Base, Arizona
- March 1971 – September 1971, combat crew training, MacDill Air Force Base, Florida
- September 1971 – July 1973, aircraft commander and assistant operations officer, 336th Tactical Fighter Squadron, Seymour Johnson Air Force Base, North Carolina
- July 1973 – August 1975, chief of aeromedical services, USAF Regional Hospital, MacDill Air Force Base, Florida
- August 1975 – October 1977, commander, USAF Hospital, Seymour Johnson Air Force Base, North Carolina
- October 1977 – June 1980, resident in dermatology, Wilford Hall USAF Medical Center, Lackland Air Force Base, Texas
- June 1980 – September 1981, staff dermatologist, Keesler USAF Medical Center, Keesler Air Force Base, Mississippi
- September 1981 – April 1983, chief of flight test operations, Royal Air Force Institute of Aviation Medicine, U.S. Air Force-Royal Air Force exchange program, Royal Air Force Station Farnborough, England
- April 1983 – February 1984, commander, USAF Regional Hospital, Langley Air Force Base, Virginia
- February 1984 – October 1984, director of professional services, Office of the Command Surgeon, Tactical Air Command, Langley Air Force Base, Virginia
- October 1984 – February 1986, command surgeon, Headquarters Pacific Air Forces, Hickam Air Force Base, Hawaii
- February 1986 – May 1990, command surgeon, Strategic Air Command, Offutt Air Force Base, Nebraska
- May 1990 – September 1994, commander, Wilford Hall Medical Center, Lackland Air Force Base, Texas
- September 1994 – November 1996, surgeon general, Headquarters U.S. Air Force, Bolling Air Force Base, D.C.

== Flight information ==
- Rating: Command pilot, chief flight surgeon, parachutist
- Flight hours: More than 2,200
- Aircraft flown: F-4, F-15 Eagle and Hawker Hunter
- Pilot wings from: Williams Air Force Base, Arizona (Class 71–04)

== Major awards and decorations ==
- Air Force Distinguished Service Medal
- Legion of Merit with oak leaf cluster
- Distinguished Flying Cross with oak leaf cluster
- Meritorious Service Medal with two oak leaf clusters
- Air Medal with nine oak leaf clusters
- Air Force Commendation Medal

== Other achievements ==
- 1969 Commander's Trophy, Flying Training Award, Officer Training Award, and Daedalian Orville Wright Award during undergraduate pilot training, Williams Air Force Base, Arizona
- 1971 "Top Gun," 336th Tactical Fighter Squadron, Seymour Johnson Air Force Base, North Carolina

== Effective dates of promotion ==
- First Lieutenant March 8, 1965
- Captain June 5, 1965
- Major June 5, 1969
- Lieutenant Colonel June 15, 1973
- Colonel June 5, 1978
- Brigadier General May 1, 1986
- Major General June 1, 1990
- Lieutenant General September 26, 1994

Preceded by Robert A. Buethe (acting)	Surgeon General of the United States Air Force; 1994–1996	Succeeded by Charles H. Roadman II
