= Senator Santiago =

Senator Santiago may refer to:

- Carmelo Ríos Santiago (born 1973), Senate of Puerto Rico
- Margarita Nolasco Santiago (fl. 1990s–2010s), Senate of Puerto Rico
- María de Lourdes Santiago (born 1968), Senate of Puerto Rico
- Nellie R. Santiago (born 1943), New York State Senate
- Nelson Cruz Santiago (born 1975), Senate of Puerto Rico
- Rafael Picó Santiago (1912–1998), Senate of Puerto Rico
