= Charles H. Roadman II =

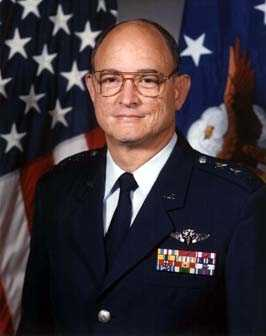
- Born: November 27, 1943 (age 82); San Antonio, Texas
- Relatives: MajGen Charles H. Roadman (father)
- Military career
- Allegiance: United States of America
- Branch: United States Air Force
- Service years: 1968–1999
- Rank: Lieutenant General
- Commands: U.S. Air Force Surgeon General
- Awards: Defense Superior Service Medal; Legion of Merit (2)
- Other work: President and CEO, American Health Care Association (AHCA); Chairman of the Board of Trustees, Altarum

Charles H. Roadman II (born November 27, 1943, in San Antonio, Texas) was the 16th United States Air Force Surgeon General (1996–1999), Headquarters U.S. Air Force, Bolling Air Force Base, Washington, D.C. His father, Charles H. Roadman (1914–2000), was also an Air Force flight surgeon and command pilot.

== Education ==
- 1967 Bachelor of Science degree in geology, Washington and Lee University, Lexington, Virginia
- 1973 Doctor of Medicine degree, Emory University School of Medicine, Atlanta, Georgia
- 1974 Squadron Officer School, by correspondence
- 1977 Internship and residency in obstetrics and gynecology, Keesler Medical Center, Keesler Air Force Base, Mississippi
- 1979 Air Command and Staff College, by seminar
- 1985 National War College, Fort Lesley J. McNair, Washington, D.C.

== Career ==
Roadman entered the Air Force in May 1968. After receiving his medical degree from Emory University School of Medicine, he completed his internship and residency in obstetrics and gynecology (OB/GYN) at Keesler Medical Center.

Roadman served as a commander three times, twice in a hospital and once in a medical center. He was also a major command deputy surgeon, surgeon and command surgeon of both U.S. Transportation Command and Air Mobility Command. He served as both commander, Air Force Medical Operations Agency and deputy surgeon general, Office of the Air Force Surgeon General. He assumed duties as Surgeon General in November 1996. He retired from the Air Force on December 1, 1999.

=== Assignments ===
- July 1968 – September 1969, clinical laboratory officer, Wilford Hall USAF Medical Center, Lackland Air Force Base, Texas
- September 1969 – June 1973, training status at AFIT, Emory University, Atlanta, Georgia
- July 1973 – July 1977, internship, then residency in obstetrics and gynecology, Keesler Medical Center, Keesler Air Force Base, Mississippi
- July 1977 – July 1980, staff obstetrician, then chief of obstetrics and gynecology, later chief of surgical services, then chief of hospital services, 401st Tactical Hospital, Torrejon Air Base, Spain
- July 1980 – July 1983, commander, 20th Tactical Fighter Wing Hospital, Royal Air Force Upper Heyford, England
- July 1983 – July 1985, commander, 554th Medical Group, Nellis Air Force Base, Nevada
- August 1985 – June 1986, student, National War College, Fort Lesley J. McNair, Washington, D.C.
- June 1986 – January 1988, director, professional services-aerospace medicine and deputy surgeon, Headquarters Strategic Air Command, Offutt Air Force Base, Nebraska
- January 1988 – May 1990, commander, USAF Medical Center, Wright-Patterson Air Force Base, Ohio
- May 1990 – September 1991, command surgeon, Headquarters U.S. Air Forces in Europe, Ramstein Air Base, West Germany
- September 1991 – July 1994, command surgeon, U.S. Transportation Command and Military Airlift Command, then Air Mobility Command, Scott Air Force Base, Illinois
- July 1994 – November 1996, commander and director, Air Force Medical Operations Agency, Office of the Surgeon General, Bolling Air Force Base, D.C.
- November 1996 – October 1999, surgeon general, Headquarters U.S. Air Force, Bolling Air Force Base, D.C.

=== Awards and decorations ===
- Defense Superior Service Medal
- Legion of Merit with oak leaf cluster
- Meritorious Service Medal with oak leaf cluster
- Air Force Commendation Medal

== Academia ==
Roadman was Assistant Dean, Wright State Medical School (1988); the Distinguished Professor of Preventive Medicine at the Uniformed Services University of Health Sciences (1997–1999), and Adjunct Professor of Health Services Management and Leadership at The George Washington University School of Public Health and Health Services.

== Later career ==
After retiring from the Air Force, Roadman moved into the public health sector as President and CEO of the American Health Care Association (AHCA) (1999–2004) Dr. Roadman also served as interim president and CEO of Assisted Living Concepts as well as Chairman of the Board of Trustees of Altarum.

.

== Personal ==
LIn the 2024 United States presidential election, Roadman endorsed Kamala Harris.

== Notes ==
Preceded by Edgar R. Anderson, Jr.	Surgeon General of the United States Air Force; 1996–1999	Succeeded by Michael K. Wyrick (acting)
