= Janice Olivencia =

Puerto Rican professional golfer (born 1982)

Janice Olivencia (born September 16, 1982 in Caguas, Puerto Rico) is a professional golfer. In 2009, she became the first Puerto Rican woman to play in the U.S. Women's Open, and only the second Puerto Rican since Juan "Chi-Chi" Rodríguez to play in a U.S. Open

== Personal life ==
Olivencia grew up in the city of Caguas and is the daughter of Hector Olivencia, a collegiate basketball player at Sacred Heart University who later became a player on the Puerto Rico Olympic basketball team from 1976 to 1984, and Gladys Gonzalez. She attended Colegio Catolico Notre Dame and played in several Junior U.S. Gold tournaments, catching the eye of University of Texas coach Susan Watkins.

Olivencia was signed by Watkins and joined the University of Texas Longhorns in 2000. She won twice, was a three-time All-Big 12 Conference selection and was named the 2002 Big 12 Conference Player of the Year.

In 2009, Olivencia qualified for the U.S. Women's Open, making her the first Puerto Rican woman to play in the tournament. Olivencia began her U.S. Women's Open debut on July 9, 2009, wearing her nation's colors. "I knew right then I’d be setting an example for little girls back in Puerto Rico," said Olivencia, attired in her nation's colors — red shorts and red bow in her ponytail, white shoes and a navy blue shirt. "It’s history, and yes, I am honored and very proud to represent my country, but today I’m just another female playing in the Open."

Olivencia was cut on day two of the tournament.

== Golf tournaments ==
=== Amateur ===
- 2002 Women's Western Amateur Champion.
- 2002-2003 NCAA All American.
- 2002 NCAA Big 12 Conference Player of the Year.
- 2002-2004 Most Valuable Player.

=== Professional ===
- 7th in the 2005 Michigan PGA Women's Open.
- 3rd in the 2005 Texas Women's Open.
- T15 at the 2005 Colorado Open.
- Ladies European Tour - Qualifying School Stage II.
- 30th in the Ladies Open of Portugal.
- 29th Tour School 2007.

== Team appearances ==
- Arnold Palmer Cup (representing International team): 2025 (winners)

== See also ==
- List of Puerto Ricans
