= Colegio Católico Notre Dame =

Private, coeducational school in Caguas, Puerto Rico

Location
- Intersection of PR-768 and Avenida Troche, Caguas, PR, 00725; Caguas, Puerto Rico
- Coordinates: 18°14′10″N 66°2′56″W

Information
- Type: Private, Coeducational
- Motto: virtus et scientia (virtue and knowledge)
- Established: 1916
- Principal: Mr. José "Joaquín" Grillo '58 (CCNDS); Luz Rodríguez (CCNDE)
- Grades: PPK–12
- Enrollment: 2,300+ (2006-2007)
- Language: Spanish; English
- Accreditation: Middle States Association of Colleges and Schools AdvancED (Cognia)
- Affiliation: Catholic
- Website: www.ccnd.org

Colegio Católico Notre Dame is a coeducational Roman Catholic school located in Caguas, Puerto Rico. Notre Dame is composed of a pre pre-kindergarten, pre-kindergarten, kindergarten, an elementary school, a middle school, and a high school. They are all located on the same campus.

== History ==
The Colegio Católico Notre Dame was founded on October 3, 1916 by Redemptorist Priests (of the Congregation of the Most Holy Redeemer) with the help of the Congregation of the School Sisters of Notre Dame. Originally the school had the name of Colegio Dulce Nombre de Jesús but this was eventually changed to the name that it has today.

Notre Dame initially accepted students from kindergarten to the fourth grade. By 1921, the school had expanded to include the eighth grade. In 1947, the first 24 students graduated twelfth grade from Notre Dame.

In 1956, the grades from seventh to twelfth were moved to Troche Avenue in Caguas, its current location. The high school was then named Notre Dame High School in honor of the Virgin Mary and the School Sisters of Notre Dame. The elementary school is located next to the Catedral Dulce Nombre de Jesús in the "plaza" of Caguas. Notre Dame also has a pre-kindergarten (formed in 1986) and a kindergarten (formed in 1950), both located in the same campus as the high school. In 2017, the elementary grades were moved into a new building next to the Neumann Hall and Auditorium, in a new building.

In 1964 Notre Dame received accreditation by the Middle States Association of Colleges and Schools. Eventually, the school went back to the name Colegio Católico Notre Dame in order to unify the schools.

In 1997, the elementary school received the "Blue Ribbon Award" of Excellence in Education awarded by the "Blue Ribbon Schools Program".

Notre Dame is currently the biggest private school in Puerto Rico with more than 2,300 students from pre-kindergarten through twelfth grade.

== School motto ==
The school's motto is that of the School Sisters of Notre Dame virtus et scientia, which translates to "virtue and knowledge" from Latin.

== School anthem ==
Lyrics to the school anthem, as copied from the school website:

Viva, viva

Notre Dame que viva

ahora y en el porvenir

Alma máter de mis tiernos años,

a Dios me enseñas a servir.

A tí siempre seré leal,

Alma máter, eres mi ideal.

Que por sólo sendas de virtud

Tú guías a la juventud.

Viva, viva

Notre Dame que viva

ahora y en el porvenir

Alma máter de mis tiernos años

a Dios me enseñas a servir.

== Clubs and organizations ==
Some of the school's clubs are:

- Advocati Iustitia (Law Club)
- Amnistía Internacional Capítulo Notre Dame
- Astronomy Club
- Chemistry Club
- Chess Club
- Comic Book Club
- Dance Team Club (Founded in 2011-2012)
- Drama Club
- Ecology Club
- English Club
- Forensics League
- History Club
- Huellas (Religious ministry group)
- In Focus (Photography Club)
- Library Club
- Math Club
- Ministry of Music (Religious music ministry, an offshoot of the school choir and with many shared members)
- Model United Nations Club
- National Honor Society
- Oratory Club (Spanish equivalent of Forensics League)
- Robotics Club
- Scala (School newspaper, founded in 1946)
- School Band
- School Choir "Coral Juvenil Mare Mia"
- Seoul Knights (Korean Club)
- Soles Verdes Club (Ecology Club)
- Scientia Club (Science Club for the Middle School)
- Student Council (Formed in 1958)
- T.E.A ("Taller de Expresión Artística" or Drama and Art Club)

== Facilities ==
The elementary school was located next to the city's cathedral, and was moved to a new facility in the high school campus in 2017.

The high school campus has a soccer field, a track, volleyball and basketball courts. The Neumann Hall Auditorium serves as a cafeteria and a place to hold large events and mass.

It also consists of many other rooms used for reunions.

In 2017, a Cybercafe was added to the school's facilities. It consists of a menu in which you pay apart from the Cafeteria.

== Famous alumni ==
- Ana Isabelle, singer, actress, dancer and entrepreneur.
- Catalina Morales, Miss Universe Puerto Rico 2015.
- José Aponte Hernández, Representative-at-Large and former Speaker of the House of Representatives of Puerto Rico, former Secretary General of the New Progressive Party
- Felipe Crespo, Baseball player.
- César Crespo, Baseball player.
- Félix Omar Fernández, Olympic Athlete, Sydney 2000.
- Juan Dalmau, former candidate for Governor of Puerto Rico, Secretary General of the Puerto Rican Independence Party
- José Luis Dalmau, current Senator of the Senate of Puerto Rico and Former President of the Senate Senator of Puerto Rico
- Miguel Laureano, Former member of the Puerto Rico Senate from the Humacao district.
- Janice Olivencia, Golf player.
- Carlos Manuel Rodríguez, candidate for future canonization; beatified on April 29, 2001.
- Lionel Perez Martinez, sports media personality, La Garata.
- Luis J. Haddock, Tennis player.
- Ismael Cruz Córdova, actor.
- Juliette Feliciano Ortiz, actress, dancer, and singer.
- Gerardo Lamadrid Castillo, published author and writer.
- Leandro Antonetti, Soccer player, Sevilla Atletico.
- Rubén Estrada (Alejo), singer.
- Ivan Rafael Gandia-Rosa, Basketball player.
- Gladymar Torres, Olympic Athlete, Paris 2024.
