= Abel Nazario =

Puerto Rican politician (born 1970)

Member of the Puerto Rico Senate at large
- In office 2 January 2017 – 24 March 2020

Mayor of Yauco
- In office 2 January 2001 – 2 January 2017
- Preceded by: Pedro Jaime Torres
- Succeeded by: Ángel Luis Torres Ortiz

Personal details
- Born: 24 June 1970 (age 56) Springfield, Massachusetts
- Party: New Progressive Party (PNP) (until 2020); Independent (since 2020)
- Other political affiliations: Republican
- Education: Interamerican University of Puerto Rico (BA,MCJ)
- Occupation: Politician

Abel Nazario Quiñones (born 24 June 1970) is former senator at large of the 26th Senate of Puerto Rico and was mayor of Yauco, Puerto Rico. He was first elected in 2000 representing the New Progressive Party (PNP). He was reelected in 2004 , 2008 and 2012. Nazario was also the vice president of the PNP and also for the local Republican Party. He was arrested on 12 September 2018 by the FBI for illegal appropriation of federal funds.

== Political career ==
Graduated with a Bachelor's degree in political science and a Master's degree in criminal justice from the Interamerican University of Puerto Rico. Prior to serving as mayor, Nazario served as staff director of the Senate of Puerto Rico Committee on Tourism, chaired by then-senator Enrique Rodríguez Negrón. As such, he was instrumental in the passage of most of the bills in then executive director of the Puerto Rico Tourism Company Luis Fortuño's legislative agenda, including a new Casino Law. Fortuño later on became Governor of Puerto Rico in 2008 in what was the biggest margin of any election in Puerto Rico. On his actual working days, Abel Nazario is known for being one of the many mayors to reduce his salary from $3,000 (2012 amount) to $1,500 (actual salary). He also had other sources of income, including professor of the University of North East (UNE), etc.

He succeeded as senator-at-large in the 2016 General Election. As of 2017, he is the president of the Senate of Puerto Ricos Committee on Education and University Reform|Education and University Reform.

== Arrest and conviction ==
On 12 September 2018, Senator Nazario was arrested at 6 a.m. by FBI agents as part of an ongoing investigation into misuse of public funds and corruption. After his release from custody while awaiting trial the Senator organized fundraising activities for his legal defense. On March 21, 2020, he was found guilty on 28 of the 31 charges against him. In 2021 he was sentenced to a 18 months in prison and ordered to pay his victims, municipal employees, compensation.
