= Andrew Pollack =

American author, activist and entrepreneur

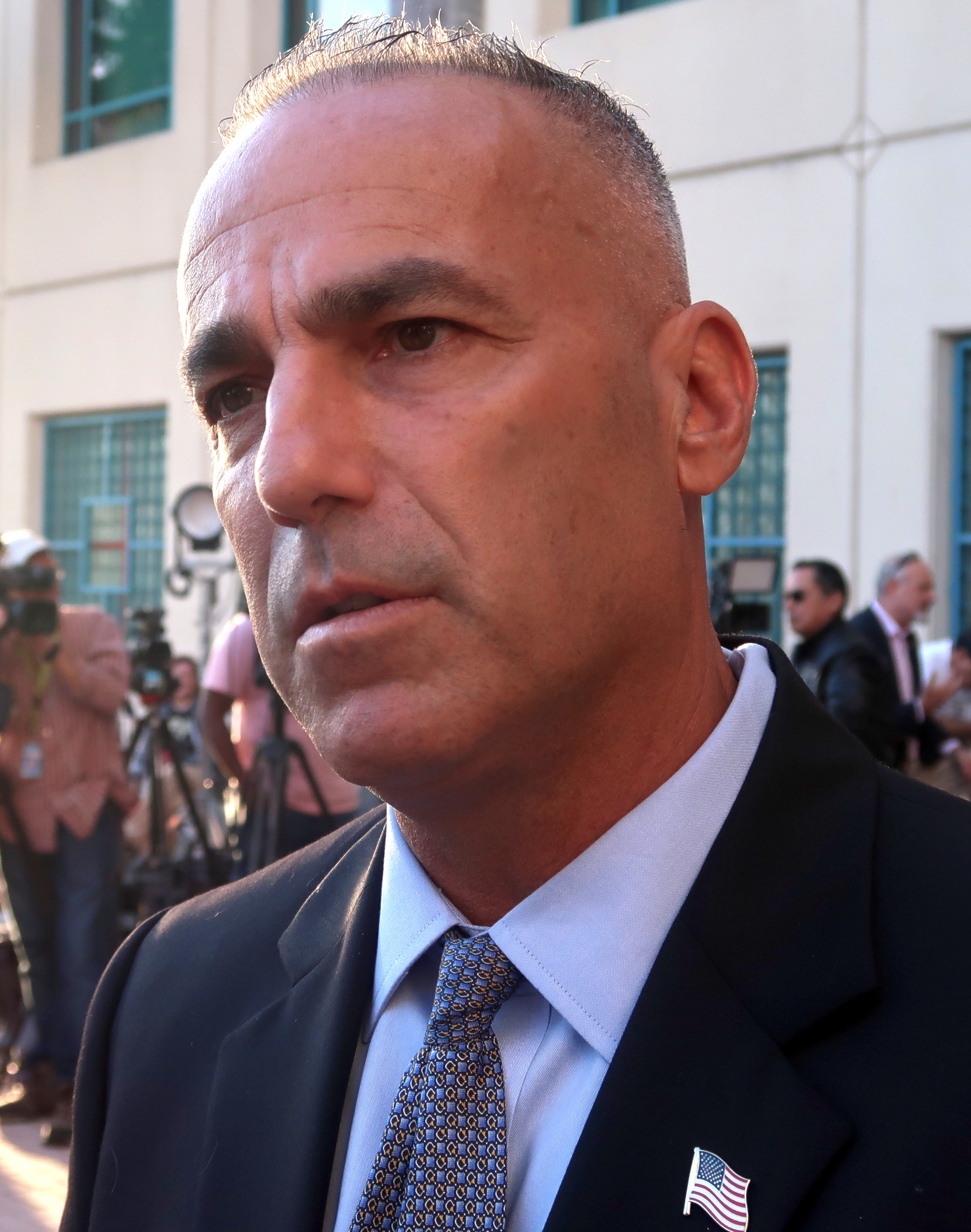
- Pollack in 2019
- Born: Andrew Scot Pollack; February 18, 1966 (age 60); New York City, U.S.
- Political party: Republican
- Spouse(s): Shara Kaplan (divorced); Julie Phillips
- Children: 3, including Hunter and Meadow

Andrew Scot Pollack (born February 18, 1966) is an American author, school safety activist, and entrepreneur whose daughter Meadow was one of the 17 murdered victims in the Stoneman Douglas High School shooting in 2018.

Pollack is among the Stoneman Douglas High School parents who lobbied for passage of the "Marjory Stoneman Douglas High School Public Safety Act" (Florida Senate Bill: 7026). Unlike many other Stoneman Douglas survivors and victims' parents, Pollack has endorsed politicians who oppose gun-control measures, and he advocates programs that would arm teachers. He argues that bulletproof glass, metal detectors, enhanced door lock systems, ID checkpoints, and "school marshals" can help prevent school shootings.

== Personal life and family ==
Pollack was born in the New York City borough of Queens, the son of Evelyn (Silverberg), a secretary, and Arnold Pollack, a dentist. Pollack's paternal grandfather was a Russian Jewish immigrant who came to the U.S. in 1933 and married a Polish Jewish immigrant seamstress. Pollack grew up in Oceanside, New York and graduated from Oceanside High School in 1984.

Pollack has three children from his first marriage to Shara Kaplan, sons Huck and Hunter and daughter Meadow. In 1999, Pollack and his family moved from New York City to Coral Springs, Florida, to be closer to Pollack's parents who moved to Florida for their retirement years. Pollack and Kaplan divorced in 2010, and Pollack married Julie Phillips around 2014.

After briefly attending Sullivan County Community College, Pollack opened a debris cleanup business with a high school friend. Pollack later moved to New York City in 1989 and started a scrap metal purchasing business.

Upon moving to Florida, Pollack became a youth lacrosse coach and partnered with his neighbor to invest in real estate.

=== Meadow Pollack ===
Meadow Jade Pollack (October 5, 1999 – February 14, 2018) was the daughter of Andrew Pollack and Shara Kaplan. She was named after Meadow Soprano, a character on The Sopranos. A senior at Marjory Stoneman Douglas High School, she was murdered in the February 14, 2018, shooting by Nikolas Cruz, a 19-year-old former student at the school. Meadow was shot six times and had attempted to avoid the shooter while struggling to get into a classroom. Teachers and students were not able to open the classroom door. Her father told CBN that as the shooter returned, Meadow covered another student (who died in the shooting) in an attempt to protect her. She was then shot five more times, killing her and the other student she shielded, Cara Loughran, a freshman.

Meadow's death prompted her father to found Meadow's Movement, a movement fighting for increased school security to prevent future school massacres.

Meadow had planned to attend Lynn University.

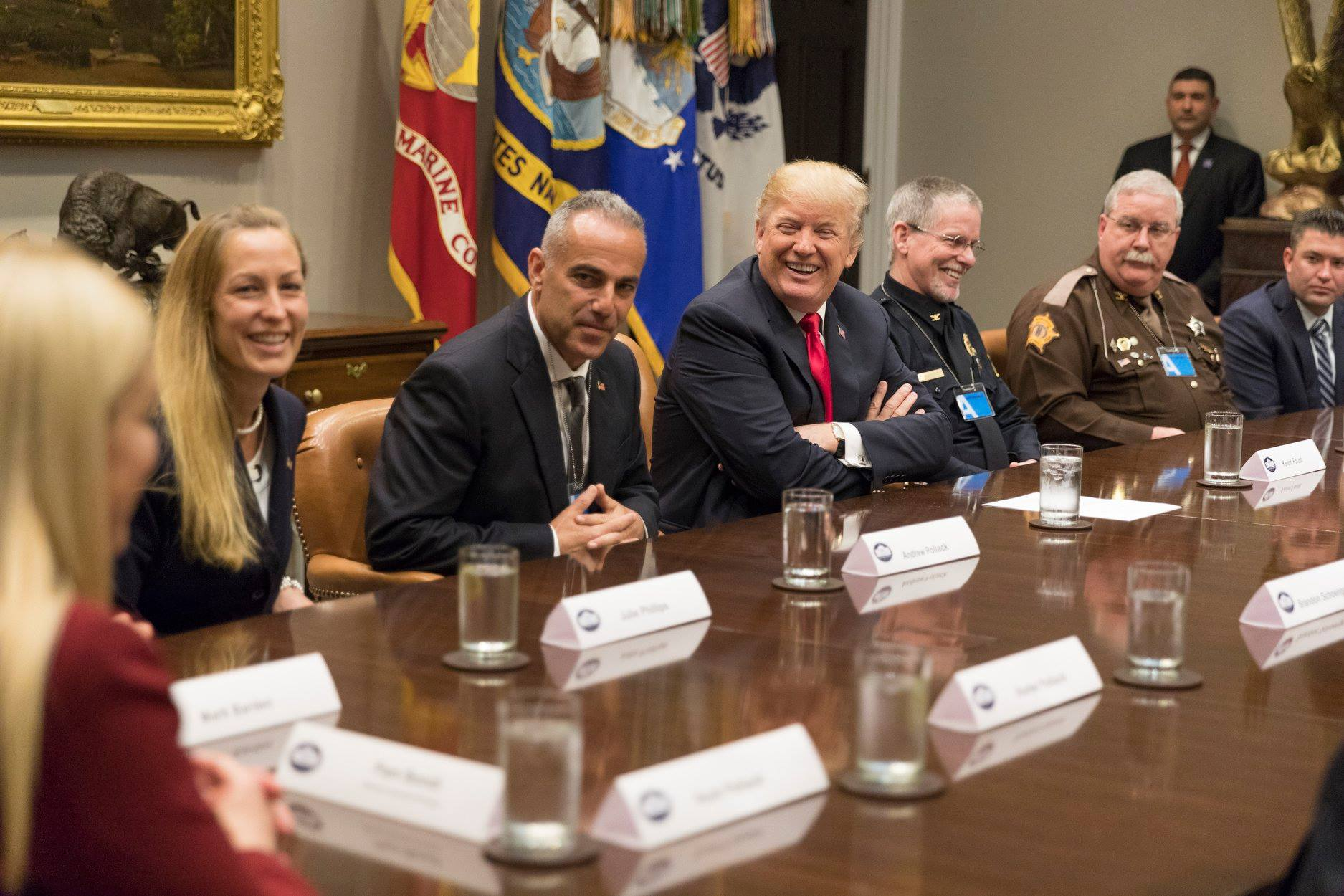
Pollack and his wife, sitting alongside President Trump and others.

== Activism ==
Pollack has met with President Donald Trump and his cabinet, Florida governors Rick Scott and Ron DeSantis, and many legislators.

On February 21, 2018, Andrew and his two sons attended a White House listening session hosted by President Donald Trump that consisted of siblings and friends of slain victims along with survivors of the Stoneman Douglas High School shooting. He spoke extensively on the topic of school security, claiming that schools do not have the same level of security as airports, stadiums, and embassies. Pollack noted that the September 11 attacks happened once and that measures were put in place to prevent attacks similar to it from ever happening again, also stating, "There should have been one school shooting, and we should have fixed it!"

In 2018, Pollack was reported as actively fighting to release more federal funding to increase school security across the nation.

Republican Governor-elect of Florida, Ron DeSantis, included both Andrew and Hunter on his Transition Advisory Committee on Public Safety.

On September 10, 2019, Pollack released his book, Why Meadow Died: The People and Policies That Created The Parkland Shooter and Endanger America's Students, alongside education expert and senior fellow at the Manhattan Institute, Max Eden.

Pollack spoke at the 2020 Republican National Convention.
