= Robert A. Buethe =

United States Air Force general

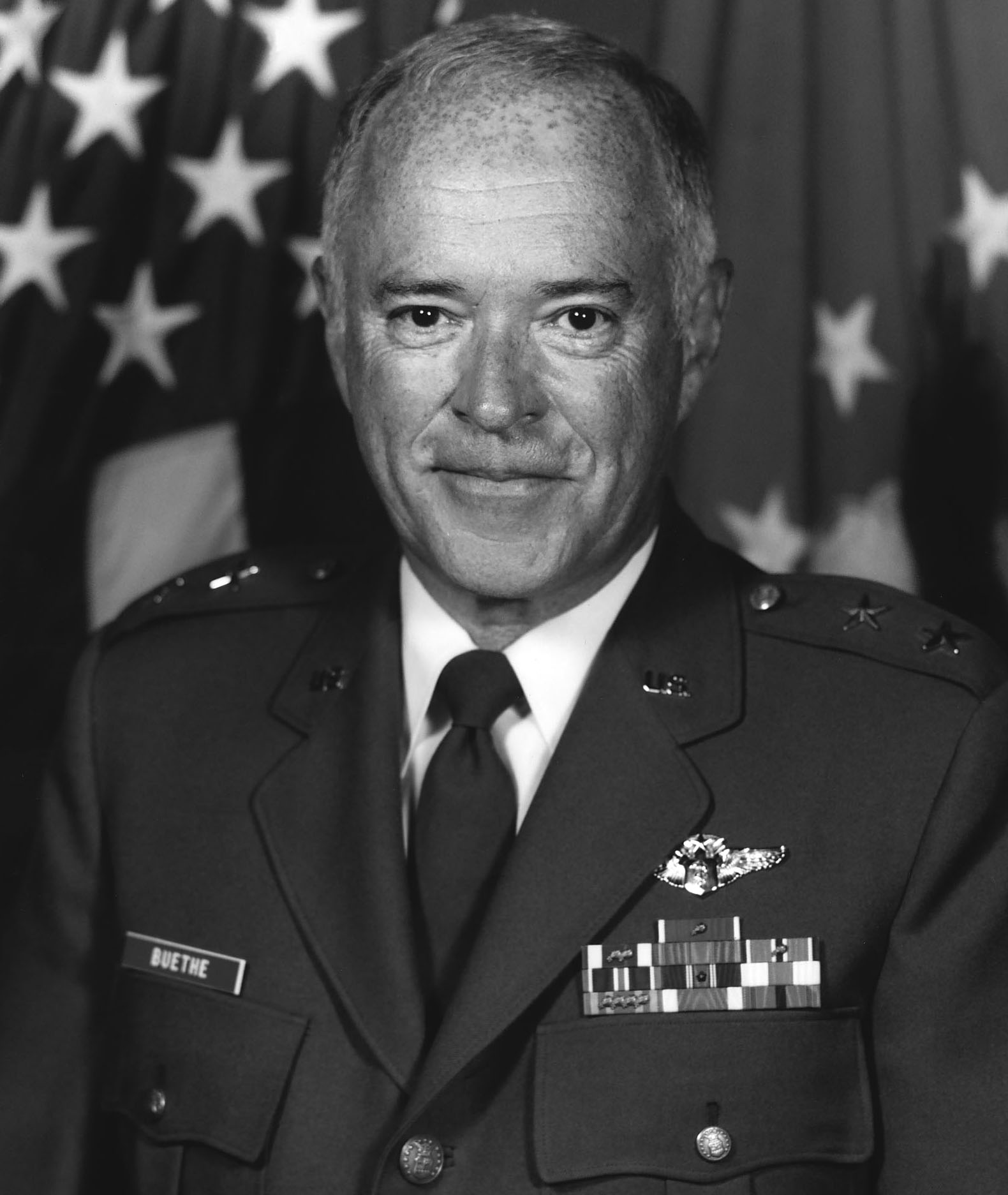
Robert A. Buethe

Robert A. Buethe (born 1939 in Chicago, Illinois) is a retired major general and former Acting Surgeon General of the United States Air Force.

He earned a Bachelor of Arts degree in biology from Beloit College in 1960 and a doctor of medicine degree from Northwestern University Medical School in 1964.

== Career ==
Buethe joined the United States Air Force in 1969. He served four years as Chief of Obstetrics and Gynaecology at Barksdale Air Force Base before transferring to Headquarters Strategic Air Command as Chief of the Clinical Medicine Division, Office of the Surgeon.

In 1974, he was given command of the hospital at Plattsburgh Air Force Base. He was the youngest hospital commander in the Strategic Air Command at the time at the age of 35. Buethe would later assume command of the hospitals Pease Air Force Base and at Barksdale. During his time at Barksdale, he also served as a medical advisor to the commander of the Eighth Air Force.

In 1980, Buethe was named Deputy Command Surgeon at Headquarters U.S. Air Forces Europe. While there, he was prominent in the creating the medical standards for the NATO Boeing E-3 Sentry crews. In 1981, he organized and commanded Medical Red Flag-Munich, the Air Force's largest medical readiness exercise.

Buethe transferred to the Office of the Surgeon General after returning to the U.S. In 1985, he became Director of Medical Plans and Resources after having previously served as deputy director. As such, he took part in reviewing and approving all Air Force medical programs and projects. In 1987, he was named Command Surgeon at Headquarters, Tactical Air Command.

Buethe was named Director of Medical Programs and Resources of the Air Force in 1991. He served as Acting Surgeon General of the Air Force beginning in 1994. He retired after his term of service.

Awards he received include the Air Force Distinguished Service Medal, the Legion of Merit with oak leaf cluster, the Meritorious Service Medal with two oak leaf clusters and the Air Force Commendation Medal.
