= Axel Roque =

Puerto Rican politician

Member of the Puerto Rico House of Representatives from the 28th District
- Assuming office January 2, 2025
- Succeeding: Juan J. Santiago Nieves

Member of the Puerto Rico Senate from the Guayama district
- In office January 2, 2017 – January 2, 2021

Member of the Municipal Assembly of Naranjito, Puerto Rico
- In office 2010–2016

Personal details
- Born: July 21, 1983 (age 43) Bayamón, Puerto Rico
- Party: New Progressive Party (PNP)
- Education: Interamerican University of Puerto Rico (B.Ed.)

Axel F. Roque Gracía (Chino) is a Puerto Rican politician elected to the Senate of Puerto Rico on the Guayama district.

== Early years and studies ==
Axel Roque was born on July 21, 1983, in Bayamón, Puerto Rico. Went thru the Puerto Rico public education system graduating at Francisco Morales High School in Naranjito, Puerto Rico. in 2007 earned a Bachelor of education with a concentration in history from the Interamerican University of Puerto Rico. Worked as history teacher with the Puerto Rico Department of Education.

== Politics ==
Roque is the vice president on the New Progressive Party of Puerto Rico youth committee in Naranjito and served as a member of the city council in Naranjito from 2013 until 2016. Roque was elected as senator in the 2016 Puerto Rico general elections for the Guayama district. Presides the Youth, Recreation and sports committee.

in 2019 Axel Roque lost a special election for mayor of Barranquitas, Puerto Rico against Elliot Colón Blanco.

Became a Member of the Puerto Rico House of Representatives for the 28th District at the 2024 elections.
