= Nayda Venegas =

Puerto Rican politician

Member of the Puerto Rico Senate from the Carolina district
- In office January 2, 2017 – January 2, 2021

President of the Municipal Assembly of Loíza, Puerto Rico
- In office 2012–2016

Personal details
- Born: July 24, 1958 (age 68) Loíza, Puerto Rico
- Party: New Progressive Party (PNP)
- Other political affiliations: Republican
- Education: Universidad del Este; Mizpa Pentecostal University

Nayda Venegas Brown (born July 24, 1958) is a Puerto Rican politician affiliated with the New Progressive Party (PNP). She was a member of the Puerto Rico Senate, from 2017 to 2021, representing Carolina Senatorial district.

== Early years and studies ==
Nayda Venegas Brown was born on July 24, 1958, the daughter of boxer Juan Evangelista Venegas who was the first Olympic medalist from Puerto Rico, and his wife Hilda Brown Quiñones.

She studied administration and secretarial science at Instituto de Banca y Comercio, Criminal Justice at Universidad del Este, of the Ana G. Méndez University System in Carolina, Puerto Rico, and theology at the Mizpa Pentecostal University in San Juan, Puerto Rico.

== Political career ==
Nayda Venegas Brown was the President of the Municipal legislature of Loiza until December 31, 2016. In the 2016 election, she was elected as one of the Senator for the Carolina District.

In 2018, she introduced Project 950, a bill that regulates abortion.
