= Florida Senate Bill 7026 =

2018 Florida law

The Florida Senate Bill 7026 or the Marjory Stoneman Douglas High School Public Safety Act is a Florida bill to tighten gun control, school security and school safety. The bill bans bump stocks and raises the minimum age to purchase a firearm from 18 to 21, and enacts red flag laws among other restrictions. It also allows teachers who receive training to be armed. The Florida Senate passed the bill 20–18 in March 2018, three weeks after the Stoneman Douglas High School shooting. The Florida House of Representatives passed the bill 67–50, with House Republicans voting 57–19 and House Democrats voting 10–31. The bill was signed into law by Governor Rick Scott on March 9, 2018.
