= American Health Care Association =

American non-profit organization

AHCA/NCAL
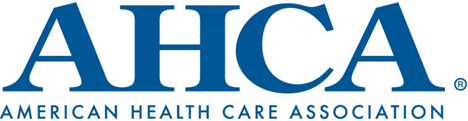
- Founded: 1949; 77 years ago
- Legal status: Trade association
- Headquarters: 122 C Street NW
- Location: Washington, D.C., U.S.
- Members: 15,000 facilities
- Official language: English
- CEO/President: Clifton J. Porter II
- Website: www.ahcancal.org

The American Health Care Association (AHCA) is a non-profit federation of affiliated state health organizations that represents more than 15,000 non-profit and for-profit nursing homes, assisted living communities, and facilities for individuals with disabilities. Clifton J. Porter, II became CEO on 14 October 2024.

The National Center for Assisted Living (NCAL) is a part of the AHCA. AHCA was founded in 1949 and is based in Washington, D.C. AHCA/NCAL works with Congress and the federal government to advocate for long-term care services. Membership is open to health care facilities of all sizes. Employees of member facilities or companies, such as administrators, directors of nursing, certified nursing assistants, and corporate staff, have access to the association's educational and networking opportunities.

== Issues ==
=== Medicare and Medicaid funding ===
In the United States, Medicaid is the primary payer for long-term care. Most Americans (64 percent) who live in a nursing homes depend upon Medicaid to pay for their care. Almost all people with intellectual and developmental disabilities and 19 percent of residents in assisted-living communities depend upon Medicaid.

Nursing homes that are Medicare-certified are called skilled nursing facilities (SNF). Medicare Part A will cover skilled nursing care in a SNF in certain conditions on a short-term basis. Medicare Part B helps cover medically necessary and/or preventive outpatient services, including physical, occupational and speech therapy treatment, which can be offered in a SNF. Medicare does not cover custodial care, or personal care like help with activities of daily living (bathing, dressing, using the bathroom, and eating).

In July 2020, CMS issued a final rule establishing a 2.2 percent net increase in Medicare reimbursements for nursing homes for Fiscal Year 2021 with total reimbursements increasing $750 million. The final rule will take effect on October 1, 2020.

AHCA supports changes in Medicaid reimbursement that link payments to quality or efficiency and believes reforms should take into account different kinds of providers and the various populations they serve. The group believes that improvements in efficiency should heavily emphasize ensuring funding is used only for high-quality services that are medically necessary. AHCA supports making any changes to Medicaid reimbursement gradual to allow for iterative patient and provider input to improve implementation.

AHCA opposes any Medicaid reform that would shift the burden of funding to state and local governments or medical providers.

In January 2020, AHCA stated its opposition to the Medicaid Fiscal Accountability Regulation (MFAR). MFAR would effectively implement new Medicaid taxes by ending long-standing exemptions and discounts that apply to some facilities and other healthcare organizations.

According to AHCA/NCAL, the typical nursing home operates on low or negative profit margins due to Medicaid reimbursements only covering 70 percent to 80 percent of costs. It is common for nursing homes to continue operations by using reimbursements from short-term Medicare post-acute care to subsidize the care of Medicaid patients. Due to the dramatic decrease in surgical procedures that would necessitate post-acute care during the COVID-19 pandemic, this model is becoming increasingly untenable.

=== COVID-19 ===
In April 2020, Vice President Mike Pence announced that skilled nursing facilities would receive a higher priority for PPE and other resources from the federal government. Pence announced that the Federal Emergency Management Agency would soon start sending PPE to every nursing home in the United States. The same month the Centers for Disease Control and Prevention (CDC) changed its priority classifications for COVID-19 testing related to long-term care. Under the new rules, health care workers and residents with symptoms would be high priority, and health care workers who contact people known or suspected to have COVID-19 would be rated priority. Before, the CDC identified three priority levels for tests. Symptomatic health care workers were rated as priority one, symptomatic residents were rated as priority two, and asymptomatic health care workers as priority three. This action came after two months of urgent requests from AHCA/NCAL.

In May 2020, AHCA/NCAL called for additional help from state and local governments for skilled nursing facilities. The group released a “Long Term Care Workforce Roadmap for Governors and States” to help protect caregivers and other staff. The roadmap asked for improved access to PPE for caregivers and other skilled nursing facility staff, helping workers with childcare and bonus pay, relaxing regulations to bring in additional staff across state lines, and the establishment of “strike teams,” including the National Guard, to assist at facilities with virus outbreaks.

The CMS released recommendations on May 18, 2020 that in addition to an initial test, long-term care and assisted living facility residents should be tested if they have symptoms or if a staff member in their facility tests positive. The Centers suggested all staff should be tested weekly. The costs associated with following these recommendations caused severe alarm in the industry. AHCA stated that testing every staff member and resident in the United States only once would cost about $444 million, thus making repeated testing “unsustainable” without government subsidies.

AHCA has identified the length of time it takes to get test results back as a major problem for its members. 90% of the facilities surveyed said it took more than two days to get COVID-19 test results. About 25% said it took five or more days. In July 2020, AHCA/NCAL sent a letter to the Secretary of Health and Human Services Alex Azar arguing that long-term care residents and providers should receive top priority for receiving a vaccine when it becomes available, as these groups face the highest risk from the virus.

The letter asked for the federal government to extend the COVID-19 public health emergency beyond its expiration date of July 26, 2020 and to keep waivers of Section 1135 and Section 1812(f) of the Social Security Act in place until certain goals, such as developing a vaccine, provision of personal protective equipment in sufficient quantities, and nursing homes reaching pre-pandemic staffing levels, are met. These sections allow the Centers for Medicare & Medicaid Services to issue blanket waivers to facilitate access to care during an emergency. The agency used a set of waivers in March 2020 including a temporary relaxation of Medicare’s restrictions on distance medicine.

On August 11, 2020, AHCA/NCAL released a report showing a large increase in COVID-19 infections among nursing home patients due to the spread of the disease in the general population. On August 13, the association released the results of a survey showing that the majority of nursing homes would not be able to continue operations another year with losses accruing at the current rate. On August 19, the association released the results of a similar survey of long-term care facilities, which have received no federal financial assistance to deal with the pandemic; It found that half of long-term care facilities are operating at a loss and 64 percent will be unable to continuing operating for another year at their current burn rates.

Following news that the federal COVID-19 pandemic emergency declaration will end in 2023, the AHCA has publicly raised concerns that nursing homes will lose money as a result.

== Quality improvement ==
In February 2012, AHCA/NCAL introduced The Quality Initiative, an effort that builds upon existing work the long-term and post-acute care field is doing by setting specific, measurable targets to further improve quality of care in American's nursing and assisted living centers.

AHCA/NCAL serves skilled nursing care centers in improving the quality of care provided to residents. AHCA provides facilities with resources and solutions for quality improvement such as the Quality Award Program, LTC Trend Tracker, Gero Nurse Prep, and Nurse Assistant Training.

== Research and publications ==
AHCA develops and compiles research and data concerning the long term and post-acute care industry. Whether conducted by AHCA and research agencies or gathered from government agencies, AHCA tries to inform the public and policymakers about the state of long term care facilities.

AHCA publishes a weekly email newsletter called Capitol Connection and a separate monthly magazine titled Provider. The publications include news and legislative, regulations, and other issues affecting its members. AHCA/NCAL members have access to various other publications which include: AHCA/NCAL Notes, NFP Newsletter, and DD Digest.

== Events ==
=== AHCA/NCAL Convention ===
This annual long-term care industry event includes speakers, education programs, networking opportunities, and other activities.

=== Congressional Briefing ===
Members convene annually in Washington, DC to raise awareness of important issues affecting long-term and post-acute care in addition to meeting with congressional representatives.

=== Independent Owner Leadership Conference ===
The AHCA/NCAL Independent Owner Leadership Conference is for independent owners and not-for-profit operators of 10 or fewer long-term care facilities.

=== Quality Summit ===
This annual conference is for long-term care professionals and focuses on quality improvement.

=== National Skilled Nursing Care Week ===
AHCA established National Nursing Home Week in 1967, which was renamed National Skilled Nursing Care Week in 2018. This is a week-long observance recognizing nursing homes. It is held in May and begins on Mother's Day, the second Sunday of May.

=== National Assisted Living Week ===
NCAL established National Assisted Living Week in 1995. This is a week-long observance recognizing the contributions of assisted living staff and residents. It is held in September and begins on Grandparents’ Day, the Sunday after Labor Day.

== Leadership ==
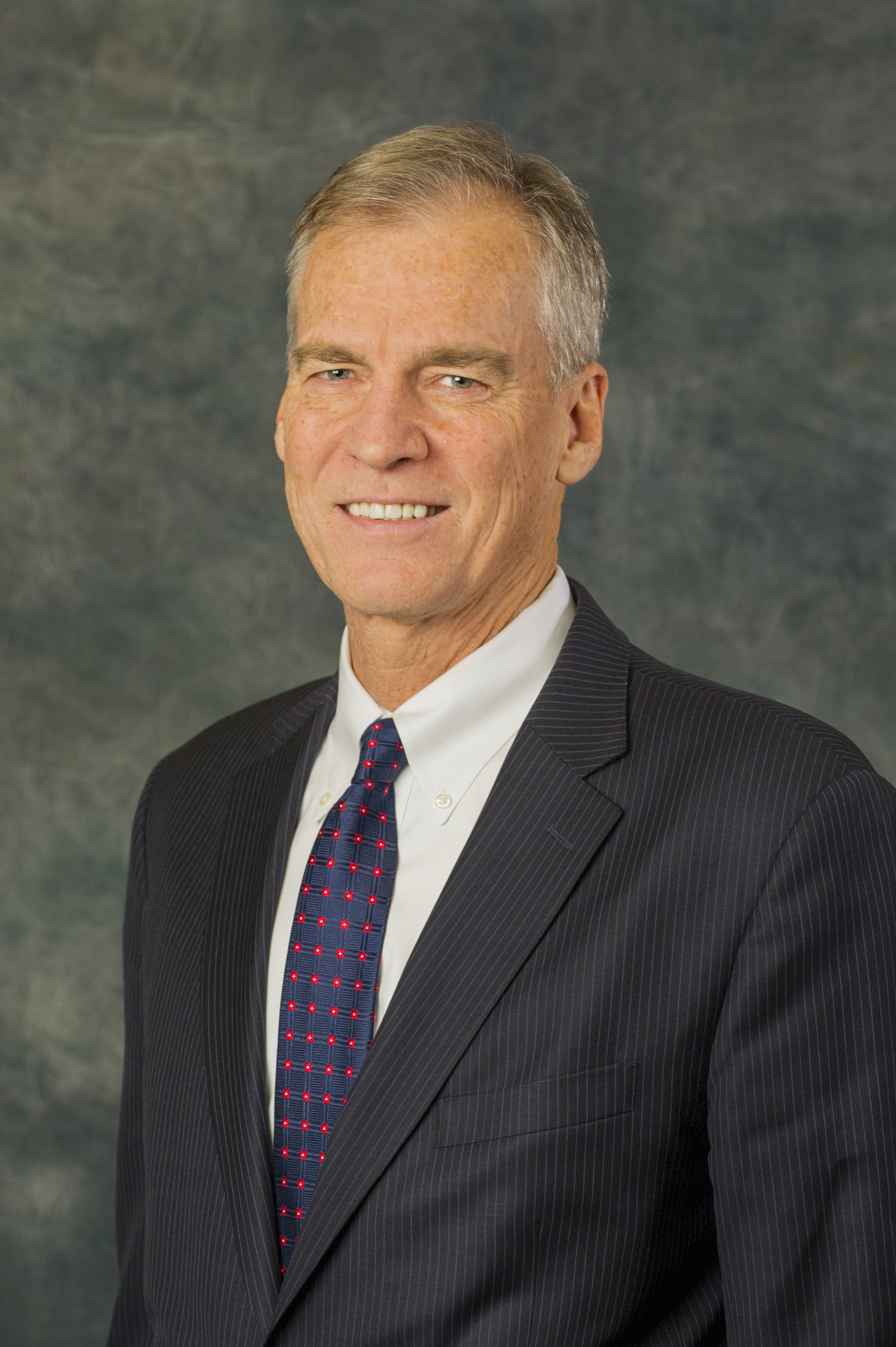
Mark Parkinson, former president and CEO of AHCA

Mark Parkinson, a former governor of Kansas and state legislator, succeeded Bruce Yarwood as CEO and president of AHCA in 2011.

In October 2024 Clifton J. Porter, II became president and CEO of AHCA/NCAL, the first Black CEO. Porter, a former nursing home administrator and long-time lobbyist, had been with AHCA for more than 20 years, most recently as senior vice president of government relations.
