= Luis A. Berdiel Rivera =

Puerto Rican politician

Luis Berdiel Rivera

Member of the Puerto Rico Senate from the Ponce district
- In office January 2, 2009 – January 1, 2013
- In office January 2, 2017 – January 2, 2021

Personal details
- Born: October 8, 1962 (age 63) Adjuntas, Puerto Rico
- Party: New Progressive Party
- Spouse: Jannette Rivera
- Children: Luis Miguel; Janeliz
- Education: Interamerican University of Puerto Rico (AS, B.Ed.)
- Profession: Politician, Senator

Luis A. Berdiel Rivera (born October 8, 1962 in Adjuntas, Puerto Rico) is a Puerto Rican politician and was member of the Senate of Puerto Rico in 2009. He is affiliated with the pro-statehood New Progressive Party (PNP) and had also served as a Municipal Legislator in Adjuntas.

== Early years and studies ==
Berdiel Rivera was born in Adjuntas, Puerto Rico on October 8, 1962. His parents were Miguel Berdiel and Paulina Rivera. He graduated from high school in 1981, with a certificate in vocational education in automobile repair and painting. He then received a Bachelor's degree from the Interamerican University of Puerto Rico in Elementary Education, and an associate degree in Special Education. He also opened his own auto body shop while studying in college.

== Political career ==
Berdiel started his political career in 1986 when he was elected to the Municipal Legislative Assembly of Adjuntas. In January, 1987, he started serving at the Finance Office of the Municipality of Adjuntas and in 1993 started working as Aide to the Mayor. He also worked at the Puerto Rico Electric Power Authority office in Bonacillo since February 1995. He was again elected to the Municipal Assembly at the 2000 elections.

Berdiel was elected to the Senate of Puerto Rico in 2008, along with Larry Seilhamer, being the first time the New Progressive Party had won that district in 16 years. in this term, he presided the Commission of Agriculture, and was vice president of the Special Commission oh the Port of Las Américas.

In 2016, Berdiel was elected once more for the Senate. Berdiel Rivera is currently presiding the Commission of Agriculture. He is the vice president for the Committee on Environmental Health and National Resources, the Committee on Development of the South Central Region and the Committee on Ethics and Public Integrity. Moreover, he is also the Secretary in the Committee on Appointments and the Committee on Public Safety.

In 2017, he opposed a senate project that would have prohibited the use of glyphosate (a carcinogen) in the public areas of Puerto Rico.

== Personal life ==
Berdiel has been married to Jannette Rivera since December 1989. They have two children together: Luis Miguel and Janeliz Berdiel.
