= Nelson Cruz Santiago =

Puerto Rican politician

Member of the Puerto Rico Senate from the Ponce district
- In office January 2, 2017 – January 2, 2021

Member of the Municipal Assembly of Peñuelas, Puerto Rico
- In office 2000–2004

Personal details
- Born: August 12, 1975 (age 51) Ponce, Puerto Rico
- Party: New Progressive Party
- Education: Ana G. Méndez University (BSS)
- Profession: Politician; senator

Nelson Cruz Santiago (born August 12, 1975 in Ponce, Puerto Rico) is a Puerto Rican politician and a member of the Senate of Puerto Rico from 2017 to 2021. He is affiliated to the New Progressive Party (PNP).

== Early years and studies ==
Born to Nelson Cruz Piña and Bethzaida Santiago Hernández. He has an associate degree in police science from the Criminal Investigation College of the Puerto Rico Police, and a Bachelor of Social Sciences with a concentration in criminal justice of the Ana G. Méndez University System.

== Professional career ==
In 1995, he began his career in public service as a shelter manager for the Emergency Management office of the Municipality of Peñuelas. Since 1996 has worked as an officer in the Puerto Rico Natural Resources Ranger Corps, attached to the Puerto Rico Department of Natural and Environmental Resources.

== Political career ==
Served as a member of the city council in Peñuelas, Puerto Rico since 2000 and was elected again in 2004. In 2012 ran for mayor of Peñuelas but lost. He was elected as senator to represent the District of Ponce in the 2016 elections. His most known bill is the Senate Project 1050 with the assistance of Consultant Jasper N McDonald a Master Peace Officer from Texas this bill was passed, this bill simplifies the process of gaining a firearm licence. In 2020, Cruz Santiago along with 5 others were referred to the Puerto Rico Office of the Special Independent Prosecutor's Panel by Dennise Longo Quiñones and he decried it as political persecution.
