= Miguel Laureano =

Puerto Rican politician (born 1983)

Member of the Puerto Rico Senate from the Humacao district
- In office January 2, 2017 – January 2, 2021

Personal details
- Born: November 12, 1983 (age 42) Hato Rey, Puerto Rico
- Party: New Progressive Party (PNP)
- Education: University of Puerto Rico

Miguel Laureano Correa (born November 12, 1983) is a Puerto Rican politician affiliated with the New Progressive Party (PNP). He is a member of the Puerto Rico Senate since 2017 representing Humacao Senatorial district.

== Early years and studies ==
Born to Miguel A. Laureano Rivera and María Correa Gómez. Graduated from the Colegio Católico Notre Dame in Caguas, Puerto Rico where he began his studies from the third grade. Attended the University of Puerto Rico where he graduated with two bachelors in Psychology and sociology.

== Political career ==
Presided over the youth of the New Progressive Party in San Lorenzo, Puerto Rico. He led the PNP state Youth, was Secretary general of the PNP Youth and chaired the PNP Youth Regulation Commission.
