= Eric Correa Rivera =

Puerto Rican politician

Member of the Puerto Rico Senate from the Carolina district
- In office January 2, 2017 – January 2, 2021

Member of the Puerto Rico House of Representatives from the 38th District
- In office January 2, 2009 – January 1, 2013
- Preceded by: Pedro A. Rodríguez
- Succeeded by: Javier Aponte Dalmau

Personal details
- Born: April 5, 1975 (age 51) Río Piedras, Puerto Rico
- Party: New Progressive Party (PNP)
- Education: University of Turabo (BE)

Eric Correa Rivera (born April 5, 1975) is a Puerto Rican politician affiliated with the New Progressive Party (PNP). Previously he has served as a member of the Puerto Rico House of Representatives representing District 38.

== Early years and studies ==
Eric Correa Rivera was born on April 5, 1975. He was raised in Carolina, Puerto Rico, where he completed his elementary and high school. He graduated from the Angel P. Millán High School in Carolina.

Correa later enrolled at the University of Turabo to obtain a Bachelor's degree in Mechanical Engineering. In 2016, he was elected to the Senate of Puerto Rico for the Carolina senatorial district and took office in January 2017.

== Political career ==
In 2001, Correa decided to enter active politics and ran for President of the New Progressive Party in his Precinct (106, Carolina). However, after being elected at the 2003 PNP primaries to run for the House of Representatives of Puerto Rico, he was defeated at the general election the next year.

After winning again on the 2008 primaries, Correa campaigned again for the House of Representatives, and was elected at the general election.

After just one term at the House, Correa was not reelected in 2012.
