= Conny Varela =

Puerto Rican politician

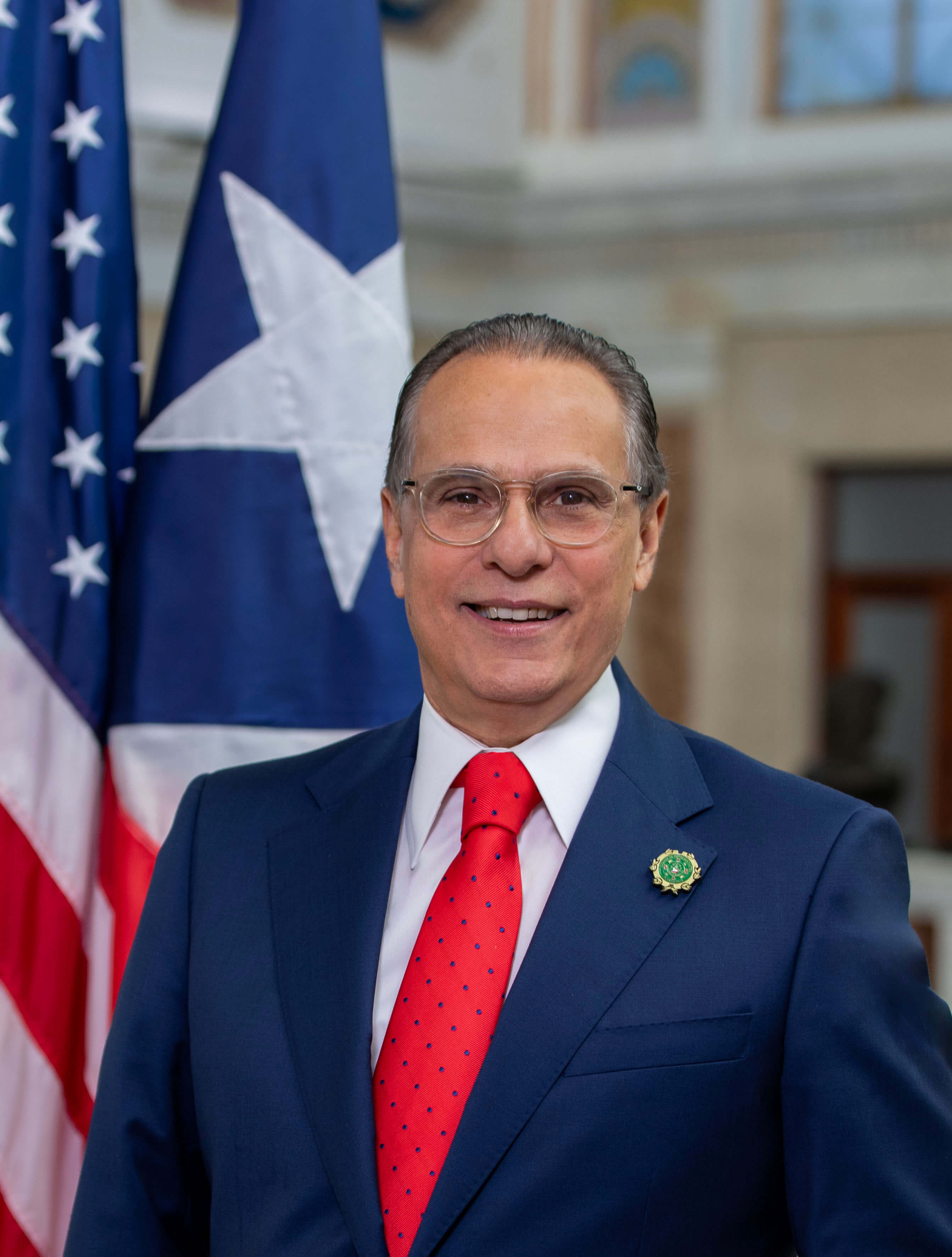

Speaker pro tempore of the Puerto Rico House of Representatives
- In office January 2, 2021 – January 2, 2025
- Preceded by: Pichy Torres
- Succeeded by: Angel Peña Ramírez

Member of the Puerto Rico House of Representatives from the 32nd district
- Incumbent
- Assumed office January 2, 1997
- Preceded by: Luis Hernández Santiago

Member of the Municipal Assembly of Caguas, Puerto Rico
- In office 1993-1996

Personal details
- Born: José Manuel Varela Fernández; February 13, 1954 (age 72) Cayey, Puerto Rico
- Party: Popular Democratic
- Other political affiliations: Democratic
- Children: 3
- Education: University of Puerto Rico (BA); University of Puerto Rico School of Law (JD)

José Manuel "Conny" Varela Fernández (born February 13, 1954) is an American politician who has served in the House of Representatives of Puerto Rico from the 32nd district since 1997. Speaker pro tempore from 2021 to 2025.

== Early life and education ==
José Manuel Varela Fernández was born in Cayey, Puerto Rico, on February 13, 1954, and has lived in Caguas, Puerto Rico, since 1976. He attended Miguel Meléndez Muñoz High School and Colegio Católico Notre Dame. He graduated magna cum laude from the University of Puerto Rico with a Bachelor of Arts degree in 1974, and from the University of Puerto Rico School of Law, where he was class president as a freshman, with a Juris Doctor in 1977.

== Career ==
=== Legal ===
Varela worked for the Puerto Rico Department of Justice during his senior year at the University of Puerto Rico School of Law. He was a partner at Varela & Varela from 1977 to 1996. At Puerto Rico Junior College he was criminology professor in 1978, and a commercial law and political science professor at Caguas City College from 1979 to 1980. From 1989 to 1991, Varela worked as a legal advisor to the Government Commission of the House of Representatives.

=== Political ===
In 1993, Varela became a municipal legislator in Caguas. He was elected to the House of Representatives of Puerto Rico from the 32nd district in 1996.

During Varela's tenure in the house he has served on the Criminal Law, Municipal Affairs, and Retirement Systems committees. He was chair of the Government Commission and vice president of the Finance Commission.

William Miranda Marín, the mayor of Caguas, died in 2010. Varela ran for the mayoralty and defeated Marín's son William Miranda Torres. The Popular Democratic Party's municipal committee voted 35 to 30 in favor of Varela. As Varela was leaving the committee he was attacked by a crowd throwing bottles. However, his election was not certified due to irregularities and annulled.

In September 2025, Varella, along with progressive José Pichy Torres Zamora, introduced a legislative measure to create the position of vice governor in Puerto Rico.

== Personal life ==
Varela is married and is the father of three children.

== Works cited ==
=== News ===
- ""Conny" Varela es electo nuevo alcalde de Caguas". Primera Hora. June 12, 2010. Archived from the original on June 15, 2010.
- Hernández, Yanira; Rosario, Frances (June 18, 2010). "Sacan a Conny Varela de Caguas". El Nuevo Día. Archived from the original on June 21, 2010.
- Marrero, Rosita (June 18, 2010). "Certificación de Conny Varela como alcalde electo de Caguas no será tan sencilla". Primera Hora. Archived from the original on July 22, 2010.
- Rivera, Joel (June 12, 2010). "Conny Varela es el nuevo alcalde de Caguas". El Nuevo Día. Archived from the original on June 15, 2010.

=== Web ===
- "José "Conny" Varela". House of Representatives of Puerto Rico. Archived from the original on June 1, 2025.

House of Representatives of Puerto Rico
Preceded by Luis Hernández Santiago	Member of the Puerto Rico House of Representatives from the 32nd district 1997–present	Incumbent
Preceded by Pichy Torres	Speaker pro tempore of the Puerto Rico House of Representatives; 2021–2025	Succeeded by Angel Peña Ramírez
