= Mayors in Puerto Rico =

Highest-ranking officer of corresponding municipality

Mayor
- Style: The Honorable
- Term length: 4 years
- Formation: several laws that were repealed in favor of the Autonomous Municipalities Act of 1991

The mayors of Puerto Rico encompass the different mayors of the municipalities of Puerto Rico; each mayor being the highest-ranking officer of their corresponding municipality. Several laws existed that created the post of mayor in each municipality but they were all repealed in favor of a broad and encompassing law known as the Autonomous Municipalities Act of 1991.

The mayors do not constitute a body, and are not required by law to do so, but they have voluntarily assembled into two organizations:

- the Puerto Rico Mayors Association, which represents the mayors from the Popular Democratic Party and
- the Puerto Rico Mayors Federation, which represents the mayors from the New Progressive Party. The President of the Puerto Rico Mayors Federation in 2021 was Gabriel Hernández-Rodríguez.

Each mayor is also the commander-in-chief of its corresponding municipal police.

== Background ==
Historically mayors used to be minor political figures in the Puerto Rican landscape as the executive branch of the government of Puerto Rico exerted an overarching authority over the municipalities. However, in recent years, the executive branch has adopted a decentralized form of government and started to focus on statewide politics rather than on local or regional ones. These policies have granted a high degree of autonomy to its municipalities and their mayors, and has allowed certain highly populated municipalities with robust local economies —such as Caguas and San Juan— to prosper and exercise a high degree of autonomy, while leaving others with mild or little population —such as Florida and Moca— with challenges to overcome. Nevertheless, these policies have made mayors highly influential on the local, regional, and statewide economy of Puerto Rico, as well as in its politics and society. An example of this would be the Willie Tax which was implemented independently in Caguas by its former mayor, William Miranda Marín. The tax was subsequently adopted by other municipalities and eventually evolved into the statewide sales tax known as the Puerto Rico Sales and Use Tax (IVU).

Today, mayors have become strong political stewardesses and anchors for other politicians seeking support from the citizens living in their municipalities. It has also become increasingly common to involve and discuss political matters with the mayors, their assemblies, and the organizations to which they belong to, before implementing public policies, and approving or vetoing bills. Both the mayors and the central government of Puerto Rico, including the Governor and the Legislative Assembly, have been able to work in unison and symbiotically to up bring Puerto Rico and its municipalities.

The Puerto Rico Mayors Association was founded in 1949 by Felisa Rincón de Gautier. The Puerto Rico Mayors Federationwas founded in 1968 by Carlos Romero Barceló as the Federation of Municipalities of Puerto Rico. The president of the Federation as of 2017 is Carlos Molina Rodríguez, after succeeding Hector O'Neill.

== Duties and powers ==
Mayors in Puerto Rico have the following duties:

- Organize, direct, and supervise all the administrative activities of the municipality
- Prepare the general budget of the municipality
- Administer the budget and handle credit transfers
- Hire professional, technical, and consulting services deemed necessary, convenient, or useful
- Supervise, administer, and authorize fund disbursements received by the municipality.

== Requirements ==
The law states the following requirements to be a mayor in Puerto Rico. The candidate must:

- Be at least 21 years old.
- Know how to read and write.
- Be a citizen of the United States and Puerto Rico.
- Lived in the corresponding municipality for no less than a year before the election, and be a certified voter in it.
- Not be convicted of a felony or misdemeanor which involves moral deprivation.
- Not be destitute of employment for improper conduct.
- Not be declared mentally unfit by a court of law.

== Removal from office ==
According to an amend signed in 2006, a mayor in Puerto Rico can be removed from office for the following reasons:

- Being convicted of a felony.
- Being convicted of a misdemeanor which involves moral deprivation.
- Incurring in immoral conduct.
- Incurring in illegal acts which imply abandoning detrimental to the public function, inexcusable and unjustifiable negligence or conduct hindering to the best public interests. Such conduct must have affected the interests of the population and the rights of its inhabitants, must be related to the administration of the position of mayor, and must substantial in nature.

To determine the latter, any person can present charges against a mayor in front of a committee, which will then evaluate them and submit a verdict.

== Election ==
Like most political positions in Puerto Rico, mayors are elected every four years in a general election. Voters registered as residents of each municipality vote for their respective mayors. As of now, there is no limit in terms for mayors.

== Mayors 2025–2029 ==
There are currently 42 mayors affiliated with the Popular Democratic Party (PPD) and 36 affiliated with the New Progressive Party (PNP). The longest tenured current mayor in the Commonwealth was the mayor of Dorado, Carlos López Rivera. López has been serving as mayor since being elected in 1987. The current term ends in January 2029, following the 2024 general election.

List of mayors
Municipality	Current mayor	Party	Took office	Past
Adjuntas	José Hiram Soto Rivera	PPD	2021	
Aguada	Christian Cortés	PPD	2021	
Aguadilla	Julio Roldán Concepción	PPD	2021	
Aguas Buenas	Karina Nieves Serrano	PNP	2022	
Aibonito	William Alicea Pérez	PNP	2009	
Añasco	Kabir Solares	PNP	2021	
Arecibo	Carlos (Tito) Ramírez Irizarry	PPD	2021	
Arroyo	Eric Bachier Román	PPD	2013	
Barceloneta	Wanda Soler Rosario	PPD	2012	
Barranquitas	Elliot Colón Blanco	PNP	2019	
Bayamón	Ramón Luis Rivera, Jr.	PNP	2001	
Cabo Rojo	Jorge Morales Wiscovitch (Jorgito)	PNP	2021	
Caguas	William Miranda Torres	PPD	2010	
Camuy	Gabriel Hernández Rodríguez	PNP	2020	
Canóvanas	Lornna Soto	PNP	2014	
Carolina	José Aponte Dalmau	PPD	2007	
Cataño	Julio Alicea Vasallo	PNP	2021	
Cayey	Rolando Ortíz Velázquez	PPD	1997	
Ceiba	Samuel Rivera Báez	PNP	2021	
Ciales	Alexander Burgos Otero	PNP	2021	
Cidra	David Concepción González	PPD	2021	
Coamo	Juan Carlos García Padilla	PPD	2001	
Comerío	Irvin Rivera González	PPD	2025	
Corozal	Luis (Luiggi) García	PNP	2021	
Culebra	Edilberto (Junito) Romero	PNP	2021	
Dorado	Aníbal José Torres	PPD	2025	
Fajardo	José Anibal Meléndez Méndez	PNP	2020	
Florida	José Gerena Polanco	PNP	2013	
Guánica	Ismael (Titi) Rodríguez Ramos	PPD	2021	
Guayama	O'Brain Vázquez	PPD	2022	
Guayanilla	Raúl Rivera Rodríguez	PNP	2021	
Guaynabo	Edward O'Neill	PNP	2021	
Gurabo	Vimarie Peña Dávila	PNP	2025	
Hatillo	Carlos Román Román	PPD	2022	
Hormigueros	Pedro García Figueroa	PPD	2005	
Humacao	Julio Geigel	PNP	2022	
Isabela	Miguel (Ricky) Méndez Pérez	PPD	2021	
Jayuya	Jorge González Otero	PPD	1997	
Juana Díaz	Ramón Hernández Torres	PPD	2001	
Juncos	Alfredo Alejandro Carrión	PPD	2001	
Lajas	Jayson (Jay) Martínez	PPD	2021	
Lares	Fabián Arroyo Rodríguez	PPD	2021	
Las Marías	Edwin Soto Santiago	PNP	2017	
Las Piedras	Miguel López Rivera	PNP	2009	
Loíza	Julia M. Nazario	PPD	2017	
Luquillo	Jesús Márquez Rodríguez	PPD	2013	
Manatí	José Sánchez González	PNP	2017	
Maricao	Wilfredo (Juny) Ruiz	PPD	2021	
Maunabo	Ángel Omar Lafuente Amaro	PNP	2021	
Mayagüez	Jorge Ramos	PPD	2022	List
Moca	Ángel (Beto) Pérez	PNP	2021	
Morovis	Carmen Maldonado González	PPD	2017	
Naguabo	Miraidaliz Rosario Pagán	PPD	2021	
Naranjito	Orlando Ortíz Chevres	PNP	2009	List
Orocovis	Jesús Colón Berlingeri	PNP	1998	
Patillas	Maritza Sánchez Neris	PNP	2021	
Peñuelas	Gregory Gonsález Souchet	PPD	2019	
Ponce	Marlese Sifre	PPD	2023	List
Quebradillas	Heriberto Vélez	PPD	2005	
Rincón	Carlos López Bonilla	PPD	2001	
Río Grande	Ángel "Bori" González	PPD	2014	
Sabana Grande	Marcos Gilberto Valentín Flores	PPD	2021	
Salinas	Karilyn Bonilla Colón	PPD	2013	
San Germán	Virgilio Olivera Olivera	PNP	2021	
San Juan	Miguel Romero Lugo	PNP	2021	List
San Lorenzo	Jaime Alverio Ramos	PNP	2021	
San Sebastián	Eladio Cardona Quiles	PPD	2005	
Santa Isabel	Rafael (Billy) Burgos Santiago	PPD	2021	
Toa Alta	Clemente Agosto	PPD	2013	
Toa Baja	Bernardo Márquez García	PNP	2017	
Trujillo Alto	Pedro Rodríguez González	PPD	2022	
Utuado	Jorge Pérez Heredia	PNP	2021	
Vega Alta	María Vega Pagán	PNP	2021	
Vega Baja	Marcos Cruz Molina	PPD	2013	
Vieques	Junito Corcino	PNP	2021	
Villalba	Dan Adriel Santiago Núñez	PNP	2025	
Yabucoa	Rafael Surillo	PPD	2013	
Yauco	Angel Torres Ortiz	PNP	2017	
