= Adrian C. Finlayson =

Adrian Clark Finlayson
- Born: September 20, 1883; Boonville, New York, US
- Died: August 7, 1921 (aged 37); Syracuse, New York, US
- Burial place: Woodlawn Cemetery, Syracuse
- Occupation: Architect

Adrian Clark Finlayson (September 20, 1883 – August 7, 1921) was an American architect from New York state who worked for the United States Department of Interior in Puerto Rico and designed notable buildings in the island during the first two decades of the 20th century.

== Career ==
Having graduated from Syracuse University School of Architecture he began his career working on an architecture firm in New York City before moving on to the architectural division of the U.S. Department of Interior's now defunct Insular Department of the Interior, where he formed part of the same cohort as Rafael Carmoega and Pedro Adolfo de Castro y Besosa. He was made chief of the Public Buildings Division of the Department of the Interior of the Insular Department in 1917. Under this department he worked primarily in the design of public schools, most notably Ponce (1915) and Labra (1916), and worked for Carmoega in the design and construction of the Capitol of Puerto Rico, which was completed after his death in 1929.

== Works ==
Rafael M. Labra High School in 1918

Adrian C. Finlayson is most notable for his work in some of the most prominent public buildings in Puerto Rico during the first quarter of the 20th century, some of which he worked in collaboration with fellow architects Rafael Carmoega and Pedro Adolfo de Castro. In addition to his work on school buildings, he was also involved in the construction of public works such as the old Fajardo Municipal Hospital, the Puente Río Inabón over PR-2 in Ponce, the original Plaza del Mercado de Río Piedras (demolished in 1958), the city halls of Aguadillas and Salinas, and the Capitol of Puerto Rico.

=== Schools ===
- Ponce High School, Ponce (1915)
- Rafael M. Labra High School, San Juan (1916)
- Mayagüez High School, Mayagüez (1917)
- Rafael Cordero Graded School, San Juan (1917)
- Román Baldorioty de Castro Grade and Technical School, San Juan (1920)
- Rafael Balseiro Maceira School, Barceloneta (1921)
- Gautier Benítez High School, Caguas (1924)
- Central High School, San Juan (1925)

== Death ==
Adrian Clark Finlayson contracted malaria and returned to Syracuse, New York where he died in 1921 due to complications from pleurisy and pneumonia.
