= Alfredo Mora =

Alfredo Mora may refer to:

- Alfredo J. Mora (1933–2001), Puerto Rican lawyer and military officer
- Alfredo Piedra Mora (1915–2003), Costa Rican footballer and manager
