= Carlos Manuel Rodríguez Santiago =

Beatified Puerto Rican

Blessed Carlos Manuel Cecilio Rodríguez Santiago
- Born: November 22, 1918; Caguas, Puerto Rico
- Died: July 13, 1963 (aged 44); Río Piedras, Puerto Rico
- Venerated in: Roman Catholic Church
- Beatified: April 29, 2001, Vatican City by Pope John Paul II
- Major shrine: Catedral Dulce Nombre de Jesús
- Feast: July 13; May 4 (in Puerto Rico)

Carlos Manuel Cecilio Rodríguez Santiago, also known as "Blessed Charlie" (November 22, 1918 – July 13, 1963), was a Catholic catechist and liturgist who was beatified by Pope John Paul II on April 29, 2001. He is the first Puerto Rican and the first Caribbean-born layperson in history to be beatified.

== Life ==
=== Early years ===
Rodríguez was born in 1918, in Caguas, Puerto Rico, the son of Manuel Baudelio Rodriguez Rodriguez and Herminia Santiago Esteras, both from large, Catholic families. He was baptized at the nearby Sweet Name of Jesus Church (now the cathedral of the region) on May 4, 1919. Rodríguez was the second of five brothers and sisters. Two of his sisters married, while another became a Carmelite nun. His brother, José (Pepe) Rodriguez became a Benedictine monk and the first Puerto Rican to become abbot of his monastery.

In 1925, a fire destroyed the family's residence and business, and they were forced to live with his mother's parents. That same year, Rodríguez was enrolled to study at the Colegio Católico Notre Dame, attached to the parish church. After graduating the Catholic elementary school, he began to attend Gautier Benítez High School. His desire to become a priest was undermined by ill health. At that point, he began to develop ulcerative colitis. After two years at the local public high school, he transferred to the Academy of Our Lady of Perpetual Help in San Juan. His medical problems, however, caused him to leave before graduation. He returned to the family home and continued his high school studies as best he could while working as a clerk, finally receiving his diploma in May 1939.

=== Pastoral life ===
While Rodríguez was working as an office clerk in various towns of the region, he dedicated his resources to promote a greater knowledge of the Catholic faith by promoting a greater understanding of the Catholic liturgy. Using articles on liturgical subjects he had translated and edited, he began publishing Liturgy and Christian Culture, to which he dedicated innumerable hours. Rodríguez organized discussion groups in towns across the entire island and worked with Catholic social organizations to disseminate his ideas. He also taught catechism to high school students whose study aids he supplied out of his pocket. He was a Knight of Columbus.

In 1946 Rodríguez enrolled at the University of Puerto Rico in Río Piedras, to pursue higher studies, where his brother José and sister Haydée were already UPR faculty members. As his disciples grew in number, he moved into nearby Catholic University Center and organized another Liturgy Circle (later called the Círculo de Cultura Cristiana). Despite excellent grades and his love for studies, however, illness prevented him from completing his second year. Nonetheless, he was a voracious reader and, with only a year's study, was able to master both the piano and the church organ. In 1948, he assembled along with Father McGlone, the parroquial chorus "Te Deum Laudamus".

Rodríguez zealously promoted a renewal of the Catholic liturgy among bishops, clergy, and laypeople. He professed extreme devotion to the liturgy and worked to repair the loss of liturgical customs that had been abandoned over generations. He advocated for active participation of the laity in prayer, the use of the vernacular, and – most significantly – the observance of his much loved Paschal Vigil in its proper nighttime setting, after centuries of having this service celebrated on the morning of Holy Saturday. Increasingly convinced that “the liturgy is the life of the Church," he organized a "Liturgy Circle" in Caguas to foment better knowledge among the people. He expressed particular concern over the Easter vigil, saying that it had lost its ancient character as the focal night of the Christian year. To his delight, the Easter vigil was restored to its proper time near midnight by Pope Pius XII in 1952. One of his favorite sayings about this feast was "Vivimos para esa noche" ("We live for that night"). This is now the motto on his tomb, which is located in the Cathedral of Caguas.

=== Death ===
Rodríguez was diagnosed with rectal cancer following an operation in 1963 and died on July 13 of that year at the age of 44.

== Veneration ==
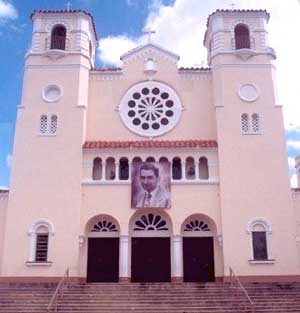
Caguas cathedral "Dulce Nombre de Jesús" (Sweet Name of Jesus). On the facade an image of Blessed Carlos Manuel Rodríguez, whose relics rest in the cathedral.

Rodríguez did not care about possessions or money. As an adult, he only owned one pair of shoes. Those shoes are kept at his sister's house, where people leave notes in them, asking for his prayers.

=== Beatification ===
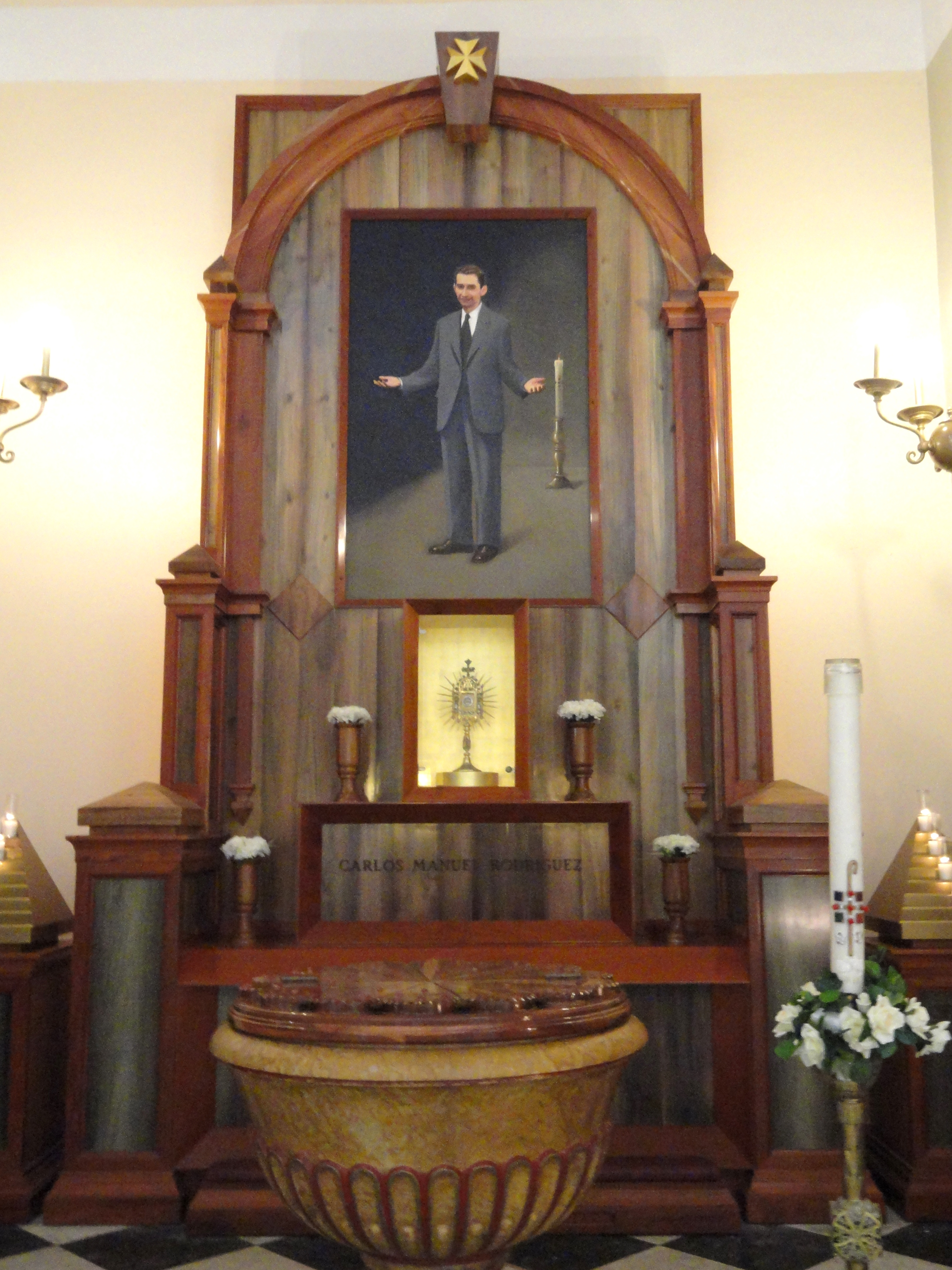
Relics at the Cathedral of San Juan

In 1991, a Catholic priest from Spain, Mauro Meza, was authorized by the local bishop to take the story to the Vatican. In Rome, Meza initiated the process of inquiry that could lead to canonization. In 1981, a 42-year-old mother was diagnosed with non-Hodgkin's malignant lymphoma. She and her husband had been friends of Rodríguez during his college years and knew of his death from cancer. She prayed to Rodríguez for intercession on her behalf. After fully recovering, she publicly attributed her recovery to the miracle of intercession.

On July 7, 1997, Pope John Paul II decreed Rodríguez's heroic sanctity and service in his life. The process took a major step on April 29, 2001, when Rodríguez was beatified by Pope John Paul. Rodríguez is the first Puerto Rican person and the first Caribbean-born layperson in history to be beatified. In the entire Western Hemisphere, Rodríguez is only the second layperson to be beatified, the first being St. Kateri Tekakwitha.

The 1983 reform of the Catholic Church's canon law has streamlined the canonization procedure considerably compared to the process carried out previously. Pope John Paul II established the new method, in his apostolic constitution of January 25, 1983, Divinus Perfectionis Magister and by the cardinal Pietro Palazzini, Prefect of the Congregation for the Causes of Saints. For Rodríguez to pass from Blessed to Saint, one more miracle (confirmed by the Vatican) is necessary.

== Legacy ==
The Escuela Superior Católica de Bayamón (Bayamón Catholic High School) was renamed in 2001 after him as Colegio Beato Carlos Manuel Rodríguez.

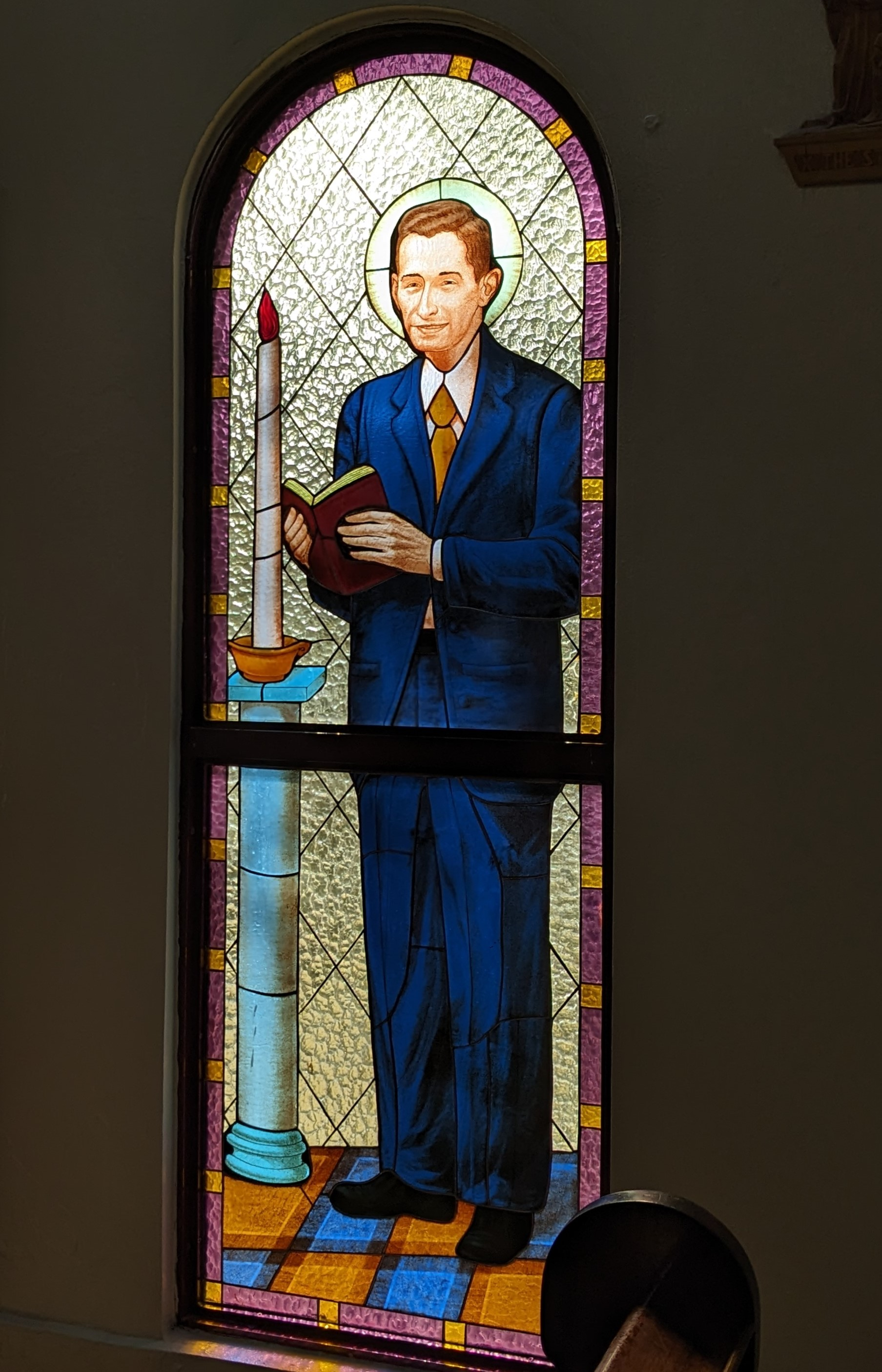
Stained glass window depicting Carlos Manuel Rodríguez located at Parroquia Nuestra Señora del Perpetuo Socorro. The church is located next to Academia del Perpetuo Socorro, where Carlos Manuel studied.

== See also ==
- List of Puerto Ricans
- EWTN page in Spanish on Blessed Carlos Manuel Cecilio Rodríguez
