= Angel Peña Ramírez =

Puerto Rican politician

Angel Peña
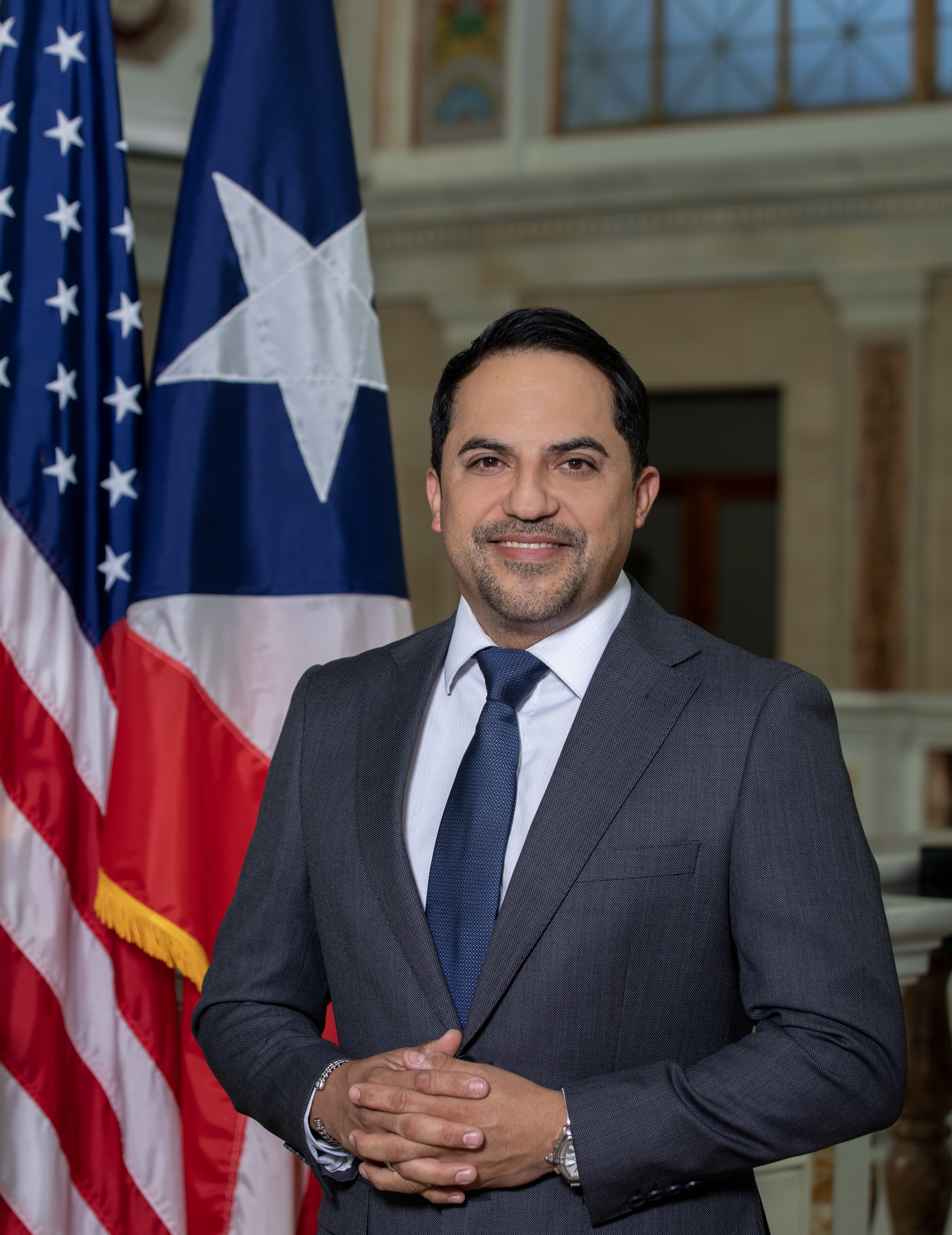

Speaker pro tempore of the Puerto Rico House of Representatives
- Incumbent
- Assumed office January 2, 2025
- Preceded by: Conny Varela

Member of the House of Representatives of Puerto Rico from the 33rd district
- Incumbent
- Assumed office January 2, 2009
- Preceded by: Angel Peña Rosa

Member of the Municipal Assembly of Las Piedras, Puerto Rico
- In office 2005–2008

Personal details
- Born: April 13, 1978 (age 48) Hato Rey, Puerto Rico
- Party: New Progressive
- Other political affiliations: Democratic
- Education: University of Puerto Rico, Río Piedras (BS); Interamerican University of Puerto Rico (MS)

Angel R. Peña Ramírez (born April 13, 1978) is a politician affiliated with the New Progressive Party (PNP). He has been a member of the House of Representatives of Puerto Rico since 2009 representing the 33rd District.

== Early years and studies ==
Peña was born April 13, 1978, in Hato Rey, Puerto Rico. He has a Bachelor's degree in Labor Relations from the University of Puerto Rico at Río Piedras, and a Master's degree in the same major from the Interamerican University of Puerto Rico, Metropolitan Campus.

== Professional career ==
Peña worked for the Human Resources Division of Wyndham International at Hotel El Conquistador in Fajardo. In 2005, he worked as Executive Officer I of the Human Resources Office of the Senate of Puerto Rico.

== Political career ==
Peña began his political career as a voting college worker, member of the PNP Youth and Presidential Delegate for the reorganization process of the New Progressive Party.

From 2005 to 2008, Peña served as member of the Municipal Assembly of Las Piedras. He served as Majority Speaker as well as President of the Commissions of Health, among others.

Peña decided to run for the House of Representatives of Puerto Rico at the 2008 general election. After winning a slot in the PNP primaries, he was elected to represent the District 33. During his first term, he served as Vicepresident of the Commissions of East Region Development, and as secretary of the Commissions of Internal Affairs, Health, and Municipal Affairs, among others.

In 2012, Peña was re-elected for a second term.

House of Representatives of Puerto Rico
Preceded by Angel Peña Rosa	Member of the Puerto Rico House of Representatives from the 33rd district 2009–present	Incumbent
Preceded by José "Conny" Varela	Speaker pro tempore of the Puerto Rico House of Representatives; 2025–present	Incumbent
