= Gautier Benítez High School =

Historic school in Caguas, Puerto Rico

- Gautier Benitez High School
- U.S. National Register of Historic Places
- Puerto Rico Historic Sites and Zones
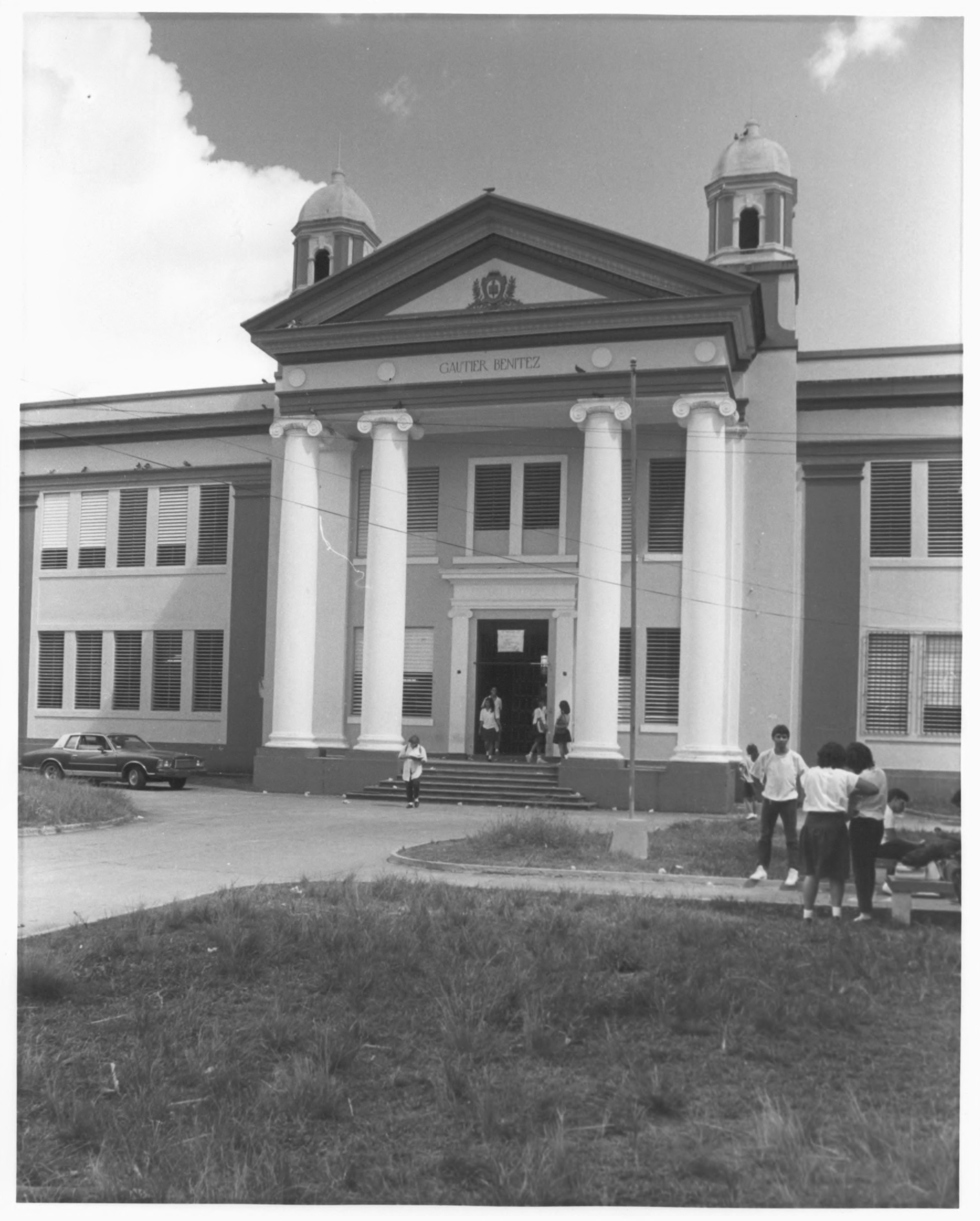

- Location within Puerto Rico
- Location: Calle Gautier Benitez and Calle Cristobal Colon, Caguas, Puerto Rico
- Coordinates: 18°13′47″N 66°2′12″W
- Area: 1.3 acres (0.53 ha)
- Built: 1924
- Architectural style: Classical Revival
- NRHP reference No.: 88000657
- RNSZH No.: 2000-(RCE)-21-JP-SH

Significant dates
- Added to NRHP: June 15, 1988
- Designated RNSZH: December 21, 2000

The Gautier Benitez High School, a school named after Puerto Rican poet José Gautier Benítez, was built in 1924 in Caguas, Puerto Rico and is listed on both the U.S. National Register of Historic Places and the Puerto Rico Register of Historic Sites and Zones.

It is a U-shaped, two-story concrete structure with Classical Revival elements including a monumental portico with triangular pediment and use of columns.

It was deemed significant for NRHP registration because it was the first high school in its area, and for its architecture. Its neo-classical style reflects Americanization of public education since the 1898 transition of Puerto Rico. It was built in a program along with the Ponce High School in Ponce and the Central High School in San Juan, both also NRHP-listed.

== Notable alumni ==
- Charlie Aponte, Singer with El Gran Combo de Puerto Rico from 1973 till 2014.
- Ángel O. Berríos, 22nd Mayor of Caguas.
- Josué A. Colón Ortiz, Executive director of the Puerto Rico Electric Power Authority.
- Alba Nydia Díaz, Telenovela actress.
- José Emilio González, literary critic and editor.
- Efraín López Neris, Puerto Rican actor, producer and cinematographer.
- William Miranda Marín, 23rd Mayor of Caguas and former Adjutant General of the Puerto Rico National Guard.
- Luis Felipe Navas, Former member of the Puerto Rico Senate from the Humacao District.
- Carlos Manuel Rodríguez Santiago, first Puerto Rican and first Caribbean-born layperson in history to be beatified.
- Vic Power, Puerto Rican professional baseball first baseman. Played twelve seasons in Major League Baseball (MLB).
- Tavin Pumarejo, Puerto Rican television personality jíbaro singer and comedian.
- Dean Zayas, Puerto Rican actor, director, playwright, professor and television show host.
