= Carmen Rivera de Alvarado =

Puerto Rican social worker, educator and activist (1910–1973)

- Born: 30 June 1910; Vega Baja, Puerto Rico
- Died: 23 July 1973 (aged 63); San Juan, Puerto Rico
- Burial place: Old Vega Baja Municipal Cemetery
- Education: University of Puerto Rico; Washington University in St. Louis (MSW); University of Pennsylvania (DSW)
- Employer(s): Puerto Rico Maternal Health Association; Puerto Rico Department of Health; University of Puerto Rico; University of Pennsylvania
- Notable work: Struggle and Vision of a Free Puerto Rico (1986, posthumously)
- Political party: Puerto Rican Independence Party; Puerto Rican Socialist Party
- Spouse: Julián Antonio Alvarado

Carmen Rivera de Alvarado (30 June 1910 – 23 July 1973) was a Puerto Rican social worker, educator, socialist and independence activist.

== Biography ==
Alvarado was born on 30 June 1910 in Vega Baja, Puerto Rico.

Alvarado graduated from the Central High School of Santurce and went on to University of Puerto Rico Normal school in 1930, earning the Carlota Metienzo Award. After graduating, she became one of the first twenty-eight social workers in Puerto Rico. During her early social work career, Alvarado worked as Executive Secretary of the Puerto Rico Maternal Health Association and as Supervisor of Medical-Social Work for the Puerto Rico Department of Health.

In 1931, Alvarado married Julián Antonio Alvarado.

Alvarado founded the first professional association of Puerto Rican social workers, the College of Social Work Professionals, in 1935, and was its first president. She also stood as a candidate for Resident Commissioner in the 1956 elections.

Alvarada studied a master's degree at the Washington University in St. Louis, graduating in 1944.

Alvarada was a socialist and independence activist. She was the a founder member of the Puerto Rican Independence Party (PIP) in 1946 and was Secretary of Women's Action of the Puerto Rico Pro Independence Movement (MPI). She was also a founder member of the Puerto Rican Socialist Party. During a trip to New York, she was an involved in a presentation about the colonial status of Puerto Rico under Spain to the United Nations. She was also a member of the Women's Committee for the Freedom of Puerto Rican politician and independence advocate Blanca Canales, who was imprisoned from 1950 to 1967.

From 1944, Alvarado worked as a professor at the University of Puerto Rico (UPR). She supported students during a strike in 1948 and undertook student counselling and thesis supervision. She attended the first congress of the Pan-American Confederation of Social Workers in Havana, Cuba.

From 1953 to 1955, Alvarado was an Associate in Social Casework at the School of Social Work of University of Pennsylvania, Philadelphia. She became a Doctor of Social Work (DSW) at the University of Pennsylvania in 1955. Alvarado returned to her professorship at the University of Puerto Rico after graduating with her doctorate, working at the university until 1972. In 1972, she was a Distinguished Visiting Professor at the Graduate School of Social Work, Hunter College, University of New York.

Alvarado was the subject of the book Tras los Pasos de Carmen Rivera de Alvarado by historian Angel Pérez Soler, published in 2024. Her book Struggle and Vision of a Free Puerto Rico (Spanish: Lucha y visión del Puerto Rico libre) was published posthumously in 1986.

Alvarado died on 23 July 1973 in San Juan, Puerto Rico, aged 63. She was buried at the Old Vega Baja Municipal Cemetery in Vega Baja, Puerto Rico.
