= Willie Tax =

Tax imposed on residents of Caguas, Puerto Rico

The Willie Tax is the municipal 1% tax imposed on the residents of the city of Caguas, Puerto Rico. The name is derived from the proponent mayor William Miranda Marín.

Originally it was levied to cover expenses relating to garbage collection and management, but a decade later it accounted for 16% of the municipal budget or $17.4 million annually.
