= Rafael Balseiro Maceira School =

School building in Puerto Rico

- Maceira, Rafael Balseiro, School
- U.S. National Register of Historic Places
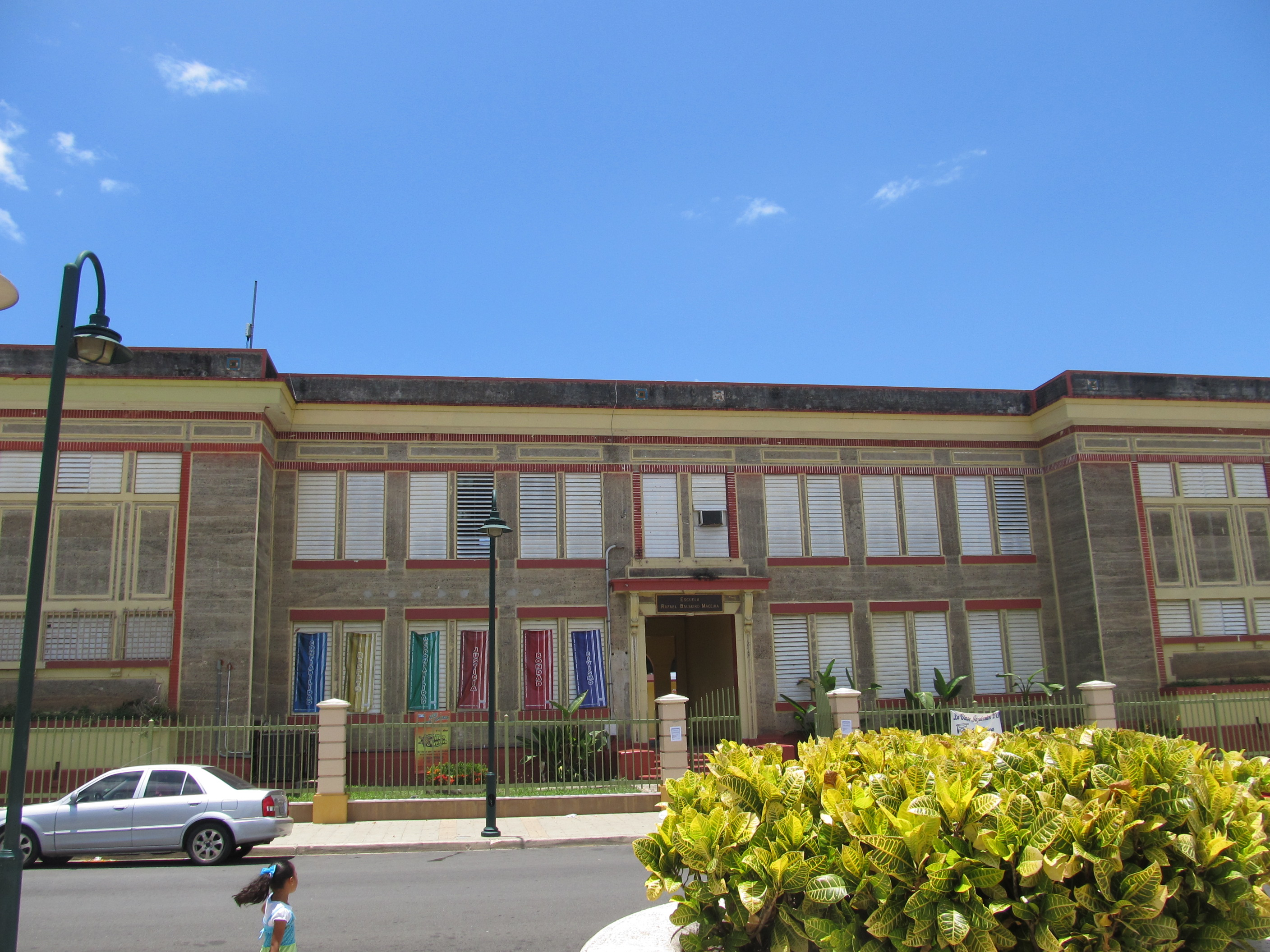

- Location within Puerto Rico
- Nearest city: Barceloneta, Puerto Rico
- Coordinates: 18°27′09″N 66°32′20″W
- Area: 0.1 acres (0.040 ha)
- Built: 1921
- Built by: Finlayson, Adrian Clark; Carmoego, Rafael; Navas, Antonio
- Architectural style: Late 19th And Early 20th Century American Movements, Prairie School, Eclectic
- MPS: Early Twentieth Century Schools in Puerto Rico TR
- NRHP reference No.: 12000583
- Added to NRHP: August 28, 2012

The Rafael Balseiro Maceira School, is located in the town of Barceloneta, Puerto Rico. The school is a reinforced concrete building with two levels, eclectic style, with L-shaped floors. It was completed in 1921. The eight-room building was designed by Adrian C. Finlayson, one of the most prolific architects of the period, and built by local contractor engineer Antonio M. Navas. The property was listed on the National Register of Historic Places on August 28, 2012.

== Gallery ==
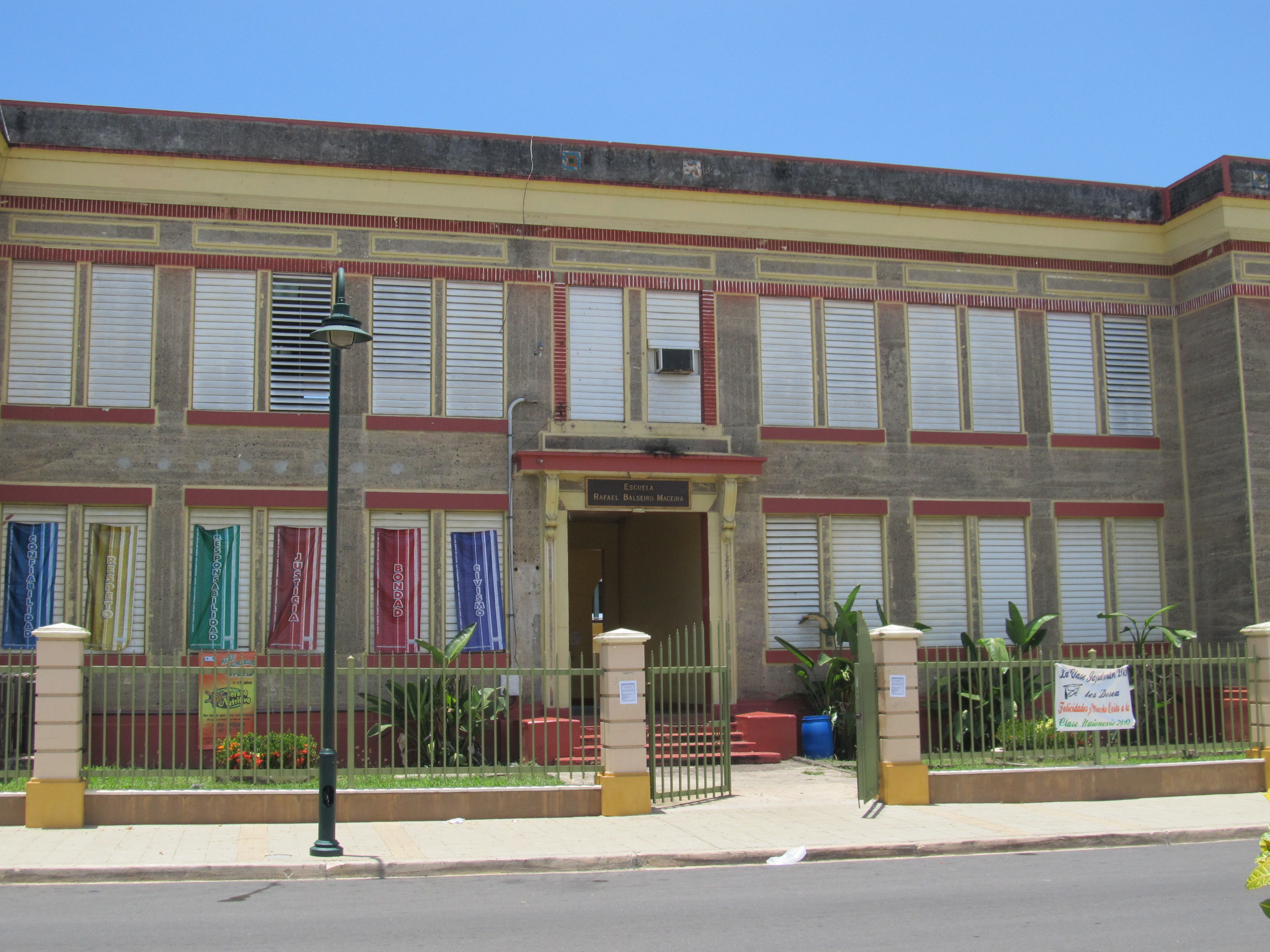
Rafael Balseiro Maceira School, Georgetti St. No. 1 Barceloneta vicinity

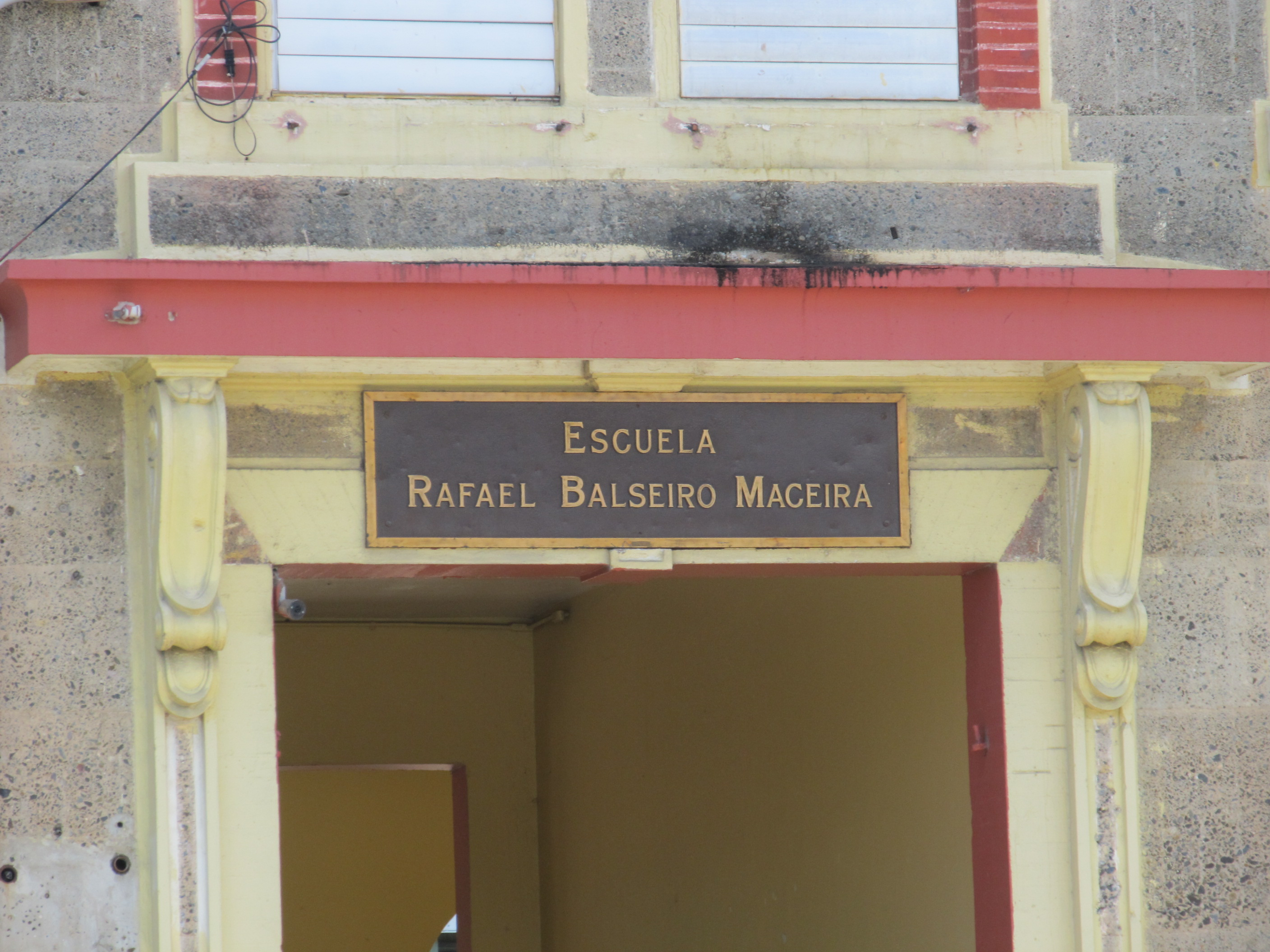
Nameplate identifying the school's name, Rafael Balseiro Maceira

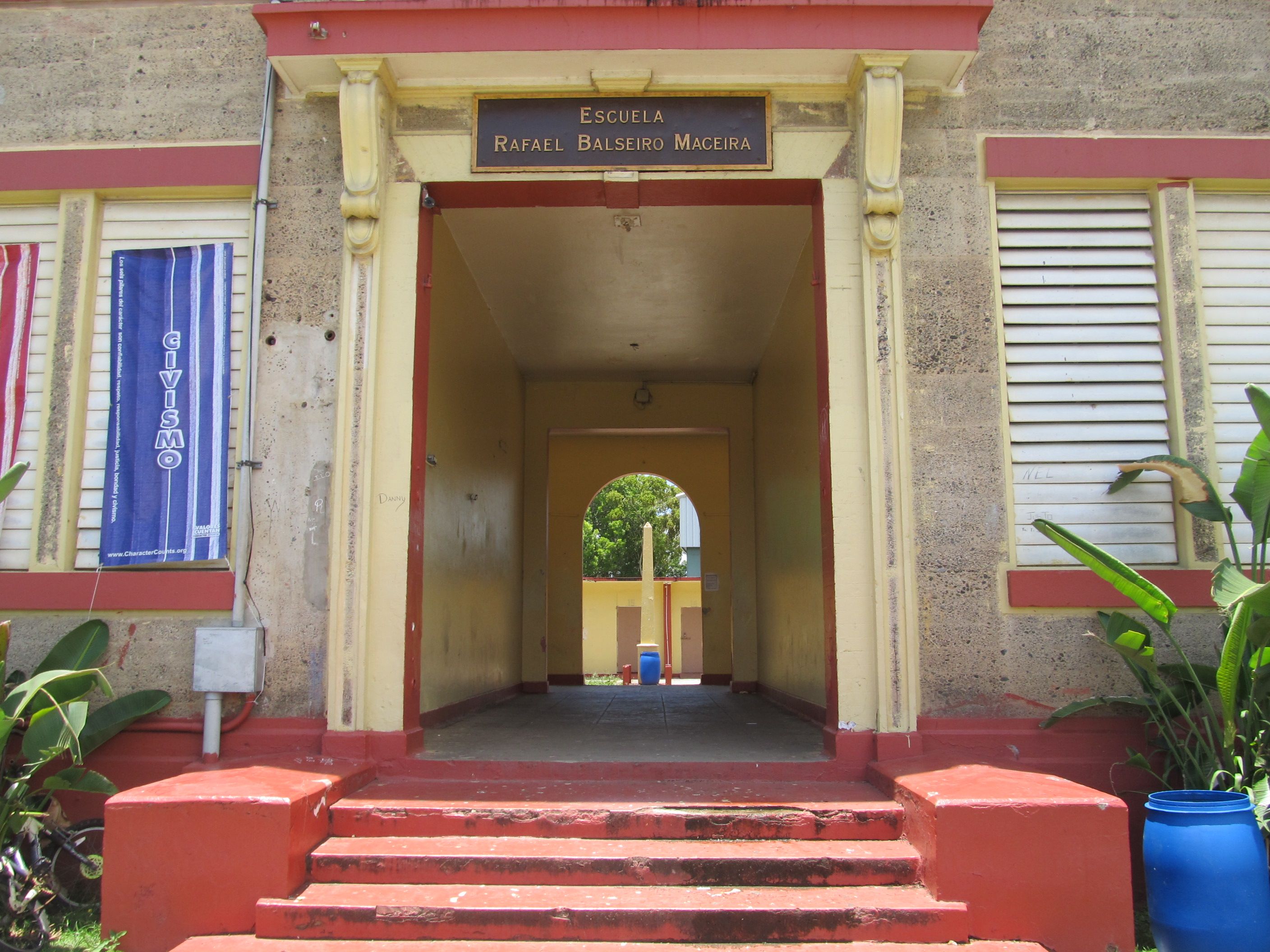
Main entrance of the Rafael Balseiro School

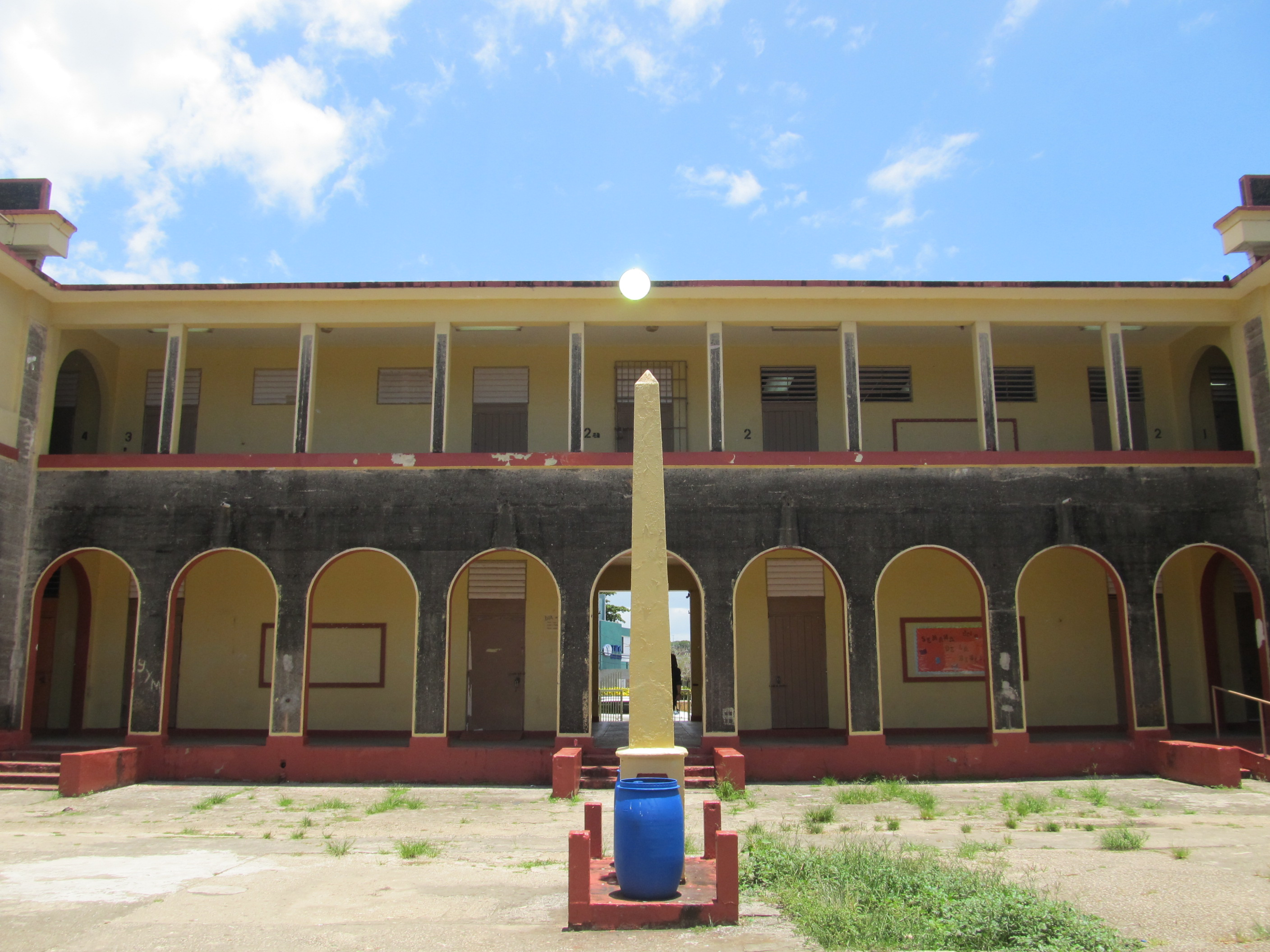
Inside the Rafael Balseiro School
