= Puerto Rico municipal police =

Group of local police forces of the different municipalities of Puerto Rico

The Puerto Rico municipal police is the group of local police forces of the different municipalities of Puerto Rico. Each municipal police operates independently and autonomously from one another with the mayor of the respective municipality being its commander-in-chief. As a whole, the forces do not constitute a body and are not required by law to do so. The different municipal forces were created by Law No. 19 of 1977.

Vehicles used by municipal police can usually be differentiated by their having blue and green flashing lights. Those used by the state police have blue flashing lights.

== By municipality ==
- Adjuntas Municipal Police
- Aguada Municipal Police
- Aguadilla City Police Department (A.C.P.D) Spanish:Policía Municipal Aguadilla
- Aguas Buenas Municipal Police
- Aibonito Municipal Police
- Añasco Municipal Police
- Arecibo
- Arroyo
- Barceloneta
- Barranquitas
- Bayamón
- Cabo Rojo Municipal Police
- Caguas
- Camuy Municipal Police
- Canóvanas
- Carolina Municipal Police
- Cataño
- Cayey
- Ceiba
- Ciales
- Cidra
- Coamo
- Comerío
- Corozal
- Culebra
- Dorado
- Fajardo
- Florida
- Guánica
- Guayama
- Guayanilla
- Guaynabo
- Gurabo
- Hatillo
- Hormigueros
- Humacao
- Isabela
- Jayuya
- Juana Díaz
- Juncos
- Lajas
- Lares
- Las Marías Municipal Police
- Las Piedras
- Loíza
- Luquillo
- Manatí
- Maricao
- Maunabo
- Mayagüez
- Moca
- Morovis
- Naguabo
- Naranjito
- Orocovis
- Patillas
- Peñuelas
- Ponce
- Quebradillas
- Rincón
- Río Grande
- Sabana Grande
- Salinas
- San Germán
- San Juan
- San Lorenzo
- San Sebastián
- Santa Isabel
- Toa Alta
- Toa Baja
- Trujillo Alto
- Utuado
- Vega Alta
- Vega Baja
- Vieques
- Villalba
- Yabucoa
- Yauco
