= Central High School (San Juan, Puerto Rico) =

Historic school in San Juan, Puerto Rico

- U.S. National Register of Historic Places
- Puerto Rico Historic Sites and Zones
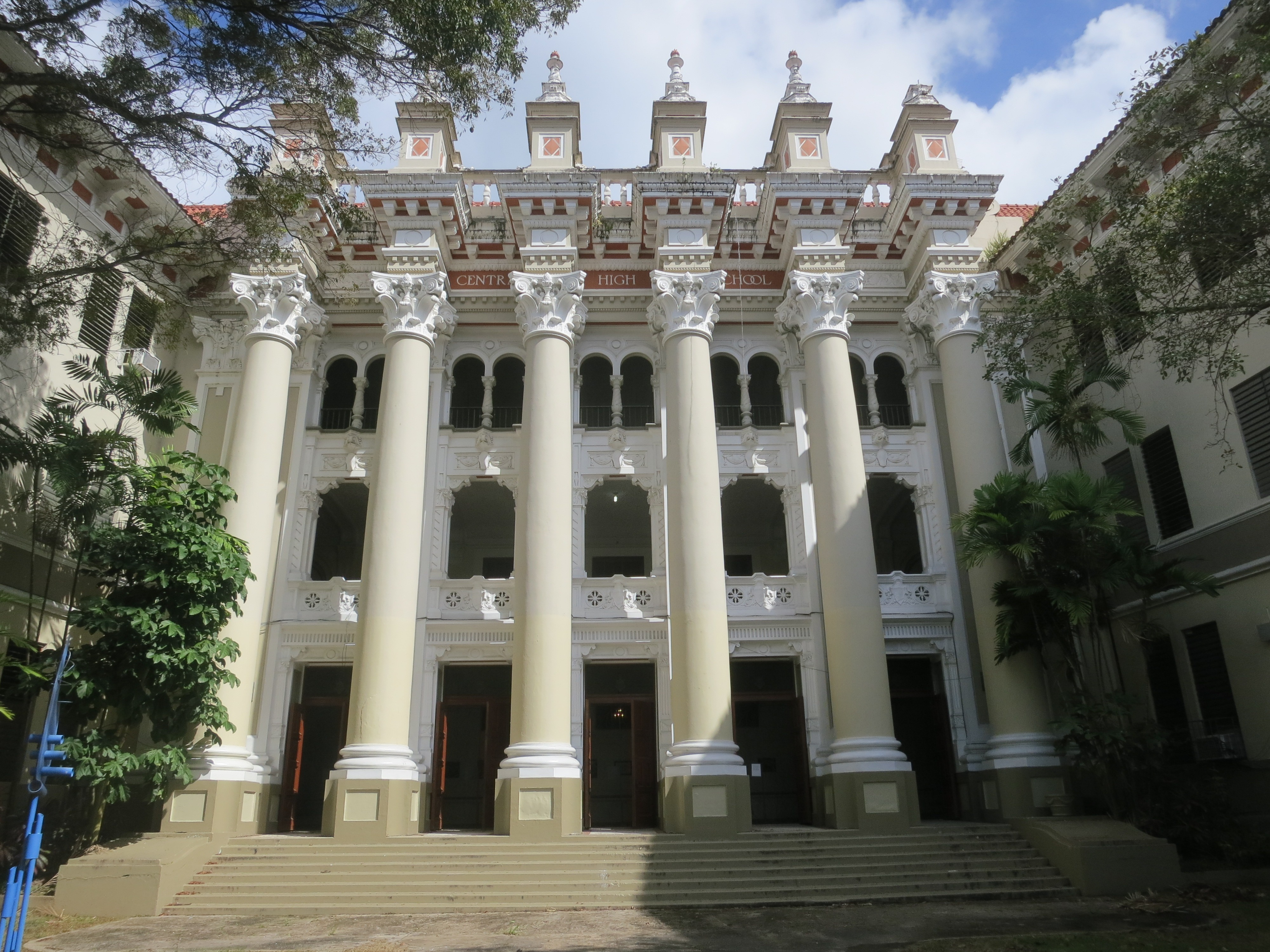
- Central High School in San Juan

- Location within Puerto Rico
- Location: Ponce de Leon Ave., Santurce, Puerto Rico
- Coordinates: 18.44815°N 66.06977°W
- Area: less than one acre
- Built: 1925
- Architect: Adrian C. Finlayson
- Architectural style: Spanish Renaissance
- MPS: Early Twentieth Century Schools in Puerto Rico TR
- NRHP reference No.: 87001309
- RNSZH No.: 2000-(RMSJ)-00-JP-SH

Significant dates
- Added to NRHP: August 4, 1987
- Designated RNSZH: February 3, 2000

Central High School, also known as La Central or La Central High, is a school located in Santurce barrio of San Juan, Puerto Rico.

The 1925-built building was listed on the U.S. National Register of Historic Places in 1987 and on the Puerto Rico Register of Historic Sites and Zones in 2000.

It is a three-story, U-shaped building with Spanish Renaissance architecture.

Its National Register nomination asserts that "Central High School is, for many reasons, the most important school structure built in Puerto Rico in the first decades of the XXth century."

It was built as part of a building program that also yielded the Ponce High School, built in 1915, and the Gautier Benítez High School in Caguas, built in 1924.

The facade of the Central High School in San Juan

== Notable alumni ==
- Carmen Rivera de Alvarado (1910–1973), social worker, educator and independence activist
