= List of mayors of Caguas, Puerto Rico =

The following is a list of mayors of the municipality of Caguas, Puerto Rico.

== List of mayors ==
=== 19th century ===
- Sebastián Jiménez, circa 1812
- José Escolástico Quiñónez, circa 1815
- Sebastián Ximénez, circa 1816
- Marcos Ximénez, circa 1818
- Vicente Aponte, circa 1820
- José Acosta, Mateo Pérez, Alexo de Mercado, Pedro Ramírez de Arellano, Florencio Ximénez, Sebastián Ximénez, circa 1821
- Juan Francisco Vázquez, circa 1822
- Juan Guadalupe Colón, circa 1823
- Manuel Suárez Valdéz, circa 1824
- José Paúl, circa 1826
- José Paúl, Gerardo Rabassa, circa 1827
- Juan Alonso, circa 1828
- Gerardo Rabassa, circa 1829
- Joaquín Goyena, circa 1831
- Luis María Valdelluly, circa 1832
- Manuel de Lastra, circa 1833
- Manuel Jiménez Córdova, circa 1835
- Gerardo Rabassa, circa 1836
- Antonio Guadalupe Colón, circa 1836
- Marcos Jiménez, circa 1838
- Vicente Aponte, circa 1840
- Zoilo de la Cruz, circa 1841
- Pedro Sánchez, circa 1842
- Antonio Grillo, Ramón Santiago, circa 1843
- Marcos Jiménez, circa 1844
- Vicente Balseiro, circa 1847
- Joaquín Mariano Polo, circa 1850
- Manuel Giménez Córdova, Antonio Guadalupe Colón, circa 1852
- Juan Alonso, circa 1853
- Félix O’Neill, Juan González Lafont, circa 1854
- Escolástico Fuentes, Pedro Bruno, Bruno Ruiz de Porras, circa 1855
- Celedonio Flores, circa 1856
- Leonardo de Campos, circa 1859
- Sandalio Jiménez, Juan Francisco de Acosta, circa 1861
- Manuel S. Cuevas, circa 1865
- Eduardo Tafaró, circa 1866
- Joaquín Martore, circa 1867
- Ramón Hernández, circa 1869
- Ventura Barber, circa 1871
- Pedro José Berríos, circa 1872
- Pascual Borrás, circa 1874
- Adón Somonte, circa 1875
- Antonio Royer, circa 1878
- José María de la Vega, circa 1879
- Pedro Pastor Egea, circa 1885
- Eduardo Vidal y Ríos, circa 1889
- Rafael Polo, circa 1890
- Francisco Méndez, circa 1893
- José M. Solís, circa 1897
- Vicente Muñoz Barrios, circa 1898
- Celestino Solá, Antonio Jiménez Sicardó, Gervasio García, Ramón Sotomayor, circa 1898
- Gervasio García, circa 1900

=== 20th-21st centuries ===
- Gabriel Jiménez Sanjurjo, circa 1907
- José Domingo Solá, circa 1909
- Gervasio García, circa 1911
- Enrique Moreno, circa 1913
- Juan Jiménez García, circa 1918
- Domingo Laza Quiñónez, circa 1924
- Pablo J. Héreter, circa 1928
- Yldefonso Solá Morales, circa 1929
- Antonio Rojas, circa 1930
- José Reguero González, circa 1932
- Juan Jiménez García, circa 1833
- Julio Aldrich, circa 1937
- Manuel Seoane, circa 1941
- Cruz Cruz Muñoz, circa 1949
- Angel Rivera Rodríguez, circa 1952
- Miguel Hernández Rodríguez, 1969-1972
- Ángel O. Berríos, 1973–1976, 1981-1996
- Miguel Hernández Rodríguez, 1976-1980
- William Miranda Marín, 1997-2010
- William Miranda Torres, 2010–present

== Bibliography ==
- Rosa E. Carrasquillo (2006). "Municipal Government of Caguas, 1880-1903". Our Landless Patria: Marginal Citizenship and Race in Caguas, Puerto Rico, 1880-1910. University of Nebraska Press. pp. 123+. ISBN 0-8032-1537-1.
