= Autonomous Municipalities Act of 1991 =

Puerto Rican law that regulates local government

Law No. 81 of 1991, officially known as the Autonomous Municipalities Act of the Commonwealth of Puerto Rico of 1991, was the extraconstitutional Puerto Rican law that regulated the local government of all the municipalities of Puerto Rico until 2020, when it was superseded by the Municipal Code of Puerto Rico. It was enacted in order to repeal many different and dispersed laws that governed them. Today, the Act served as a broad and encompassing body of law that covered all the different aspects of a municipality, including its mayor, the mayor's office, and the municipal assemblies.
