= José Emilio González =

Puerto Rican literary critic and editor

Josemilio González
- Born: 18 February 1918; Gurabo, Puerto Rico
- Died: 10 April 1990 (aged 72); Hato Rey, Puerto Rico
- Education: University of Puerto Rico (BA); Boston University (MA); Sorbonne University (Ph.D)
- Occupations: Writer and editor

Josemilio González (1918–1990) was a Puerto Rican literary critic and editor.

He graduated from Gautier Benítez High School in Caguas, Puerto Rico. He went to the University of Puerto Rico, where he graduated in liberal arts, with specializations in Spanish, French and philosophy. in 1940, Earned his master's degree in arts at Boston University, Columbia University, Princeton University, and the Sorbonne.

In 1946, he worked as an instructor for the Basic Social Sciences Course at the Faculty of General Studies of the University of Puerto Rico. He stayed in that position until 1948, when he took on the role of director of the telegraph service at the newspaper El Imparcial. In 1949-1950, he worked as a translator at the United Press Service in New York. In 1952, he was appointed legislative advisor of the Puerto Rico Independence Party.

== Awards ==
- 1990 American Book Award, for Vivir a Hostos

== Works ==
- "Otoño", taino world
- Hostos as a philosopher, Boston University, 1941
- Hostos Como Filósofo (1941) – (Hostos as Philosopher)
- Oda al mar de Guajataca (1954) – (Ode to the Sea from Guajataca)
- Profecía de Puerto Rico (1954) – (Prophecy of Puerto Rico)
- Cántico Mortal a Julia de Burgos (1956) – (Mortal Song of Julia de Burgos)
- Grito de Lares (1958) - about revolt against Spain, Grito de Lares
- Los Poetas Puertorriqueños de la Década del 30 (1960) Instituto de Cultura Puertorriqueña, – (The Puerto Rican Poets of the 30s)
- Parábola del Canto (1960) – (Parable of Song)
- Soledad Absoluta: Diario Poético (1971) – (Absolute Solitude: Official Poetic)
- Antología Poética de Francisco Matos Paoli Universidad de Puerto Rico, (1972) – (Francisco Matos Paoli Poetry Anthology)
- La Poesía Contemporánea de Puerto Rico, 1930–1960 (1972) Instituto de Cultura Puertorriquña – (Contemporary Poetry of Puerto Rico, 1930–1960)
- La Poesía en Puerto Rico (1976) – (Poetry in Puerto Rico)
- Poesía y Lengua en la Obra de Francisco Manrique Cabrera (1976) – (Poetry and Language in the Work of Francisco Manrique Cabrera)
- Vivir a Hostos: ensayos, San Juan, P.R.: Comité Pro Celebración Sesquicentenario del Natalicio de Eugenio María de Hostos, 1989.
