= Alfredo J. Mora =

Puerto Rico Adjutant General

- Born: April 20, 1933; Juana Díaz, Puerto Rico
- Died: November 01, 2001 (68); Ponce, Puerto Rico
- Burial place: Juana Díaz Municipal Cemetery in Juana Díaz, Puerto Rico
- Military career
- Allegiance: United States of America
- Branch: United States Army; Army National Guard
- Service years: 1955-1990
- Rank: Brigadier general
- Commands: 92nd Infantry Brigade (Separate), Adjutant General of the Puerto Rico National Guard

Alfredo José Mora Mercado (April 20, 1933, in Juana Díaz, Puerto Rico – November 1, 2001, in Ponce, Puerto Rico) was a lawyer and a high ranking officer who became the 10th Adjutant General of the Puerto Rico National Guard.

In 1954 earned a B.A. in Arts from the University of Puerto Rico and a Doctorate in Law from University of Puerto Rico School of Law. He worked as law professor at the University of Puerto Rico School of Law and at the Pontifical Catholic University of Puerto Rico School of Law.

He was commissioned as a second lieutenant to the United States Army in 1955 thru the Army ROTC program. Served two years on Active duty mostly in Europe.

Transitioned to the Puerto Rico National Guard on October 24, 1958. Went thru many positions in the Puerto Rico Guard until was named as commanding officer of the 92nd Infantry Brigade (Separate) on May 6, 1983.

Was promoted to brigadier general on August 2, 1984, and the following year was named Adjutant General of the Puerto Rico National Guard by governor Rafael Hernández Colón.

During his tenure as Adjutant General of the Puerto Rico National Guard, BG Alfredo J. Mora led 300 National Guardsmen to the Mameyes Landslide relief effort that occurred on October 7, 1985.

Retired from the Puerto Rico National Guard in 1990 after 35 years of service. Among Alfredo J. Mora military awards he earned the Meritorious Service Medal, the Humanitarian Service Medal and the Armed Forces Reserve Medal with Gold Hourglass device.

In his civilian life Alfredo J. Mora worked as a lawyer with the Mora & Cangiano Law Group.

== Military decorations and awards ==
Among Major General Alfredo J. Mora military decorations and awards are the following:

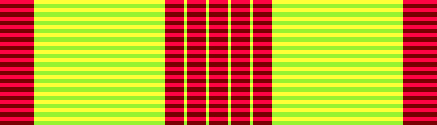
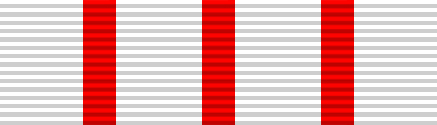
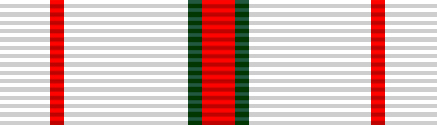
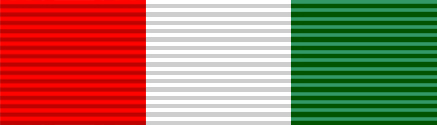
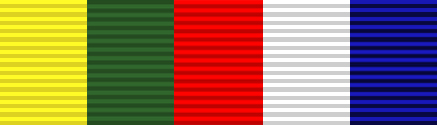
Meritorious Service Medal
Army Commendation Medal
Army Reserve Components Achievement Medal with two bronze Oak leaf clusters
National Defense Service Medal
Humanitarian Service Medal
Armed Forces Reserve Medal with Gold hourglass device
Puerto Rico Commendation Medal
Puerto Rico Civil Disturbance Ribbon
Puerto Rico Disaster Relief Ribbon
Puerto Rico Service Medal
Puerto Rico VIII Pan-American Games Support Ribbon

Badges:

- Expert Infantryman Badge

Military offices
Preceded by Brigadier General Luis González Vales	Adjutant General of the Puerto Rico National Guard; Under Governor Rafael Hernández Colón; 1985–1990	Succeeded by Major General William Miranda Marín
