= Ángel O. Berríos =

Puerto Rican mayor

3rd and 5th Mayor of Caguas
- In office 1972–1996
- Preceded by: Miguel Hernández Rodríguez
- Succeeded by: William Miranda Marín

Personal details
- Born: September 21, 1940 Caguas, Puerto Rico
- Died: April 28, 2006 (aged 65) Caguas, Puerto Rico
- Party: Popular Democratic Party (PPD)
- Spouse: Marta Silvestre de Berríos
- Occupation: Politician, Engineer

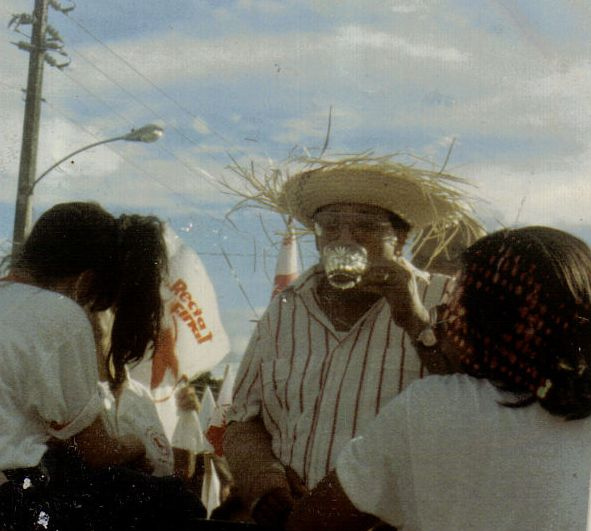
Angel O. Berrios drinks coffee during political campaign

Ángel O. Berríos Díaz (September 21, 1940 – April 28, 2006) was a native of Caguas, Puerto Rico. An engineer of profession, Berríos became the 3rd mayor of Caguas in 1973, after winning the 1972 elections, as a member of the Popular Democratic Party (PPD).

Berrios was defeated in the 1976 elections by the New Progressive Party candidate Miguel Hernández, but he came back on top during the 1980 elections. After being sworn back to office in 1981, he began a period of 16 years in a row as mayor of Caguas. During his tenure, new hospitals, malls, department stores and housing complexes were built.

He chaired the Commission for Municipal Reform, the beginning of what would achieve the autonomy of the municipalities, he was president of the Association of Mayors of Puerto Rico (AAPR), a member of the board of the Center for Municipal Revenue Collection (CRIM).

Berríos became the managing owner of the Criollos de Caguas basketball team in 1987, and, later on, acquired the Criollas de Caguas women's volleyball team. He was a member of the Phi Delta Theta fraternity.

Berríos decided not to run for mayor again in 1996, being substituted by William Miranda Marín as PPD leader in Caguas. Miranda Marín went on to win the elections that year.

Later on, an entertainment center was named after Berríos, the Centro de Bellas Artes Ángel O. Berríos.

Berríos died on April 28, 2006, due to complications of a stroke which had occurred six months prior. He was buried at Cementerio Borinquen Memorial Park I in Caguas, Puerto Rico.

== Legacy ==
A sports complex in Caguas was posthumously named after Ángel O. Berríos.
