= Orlando Ortiz Chevres =

Puerto Rican politician (born 1978)

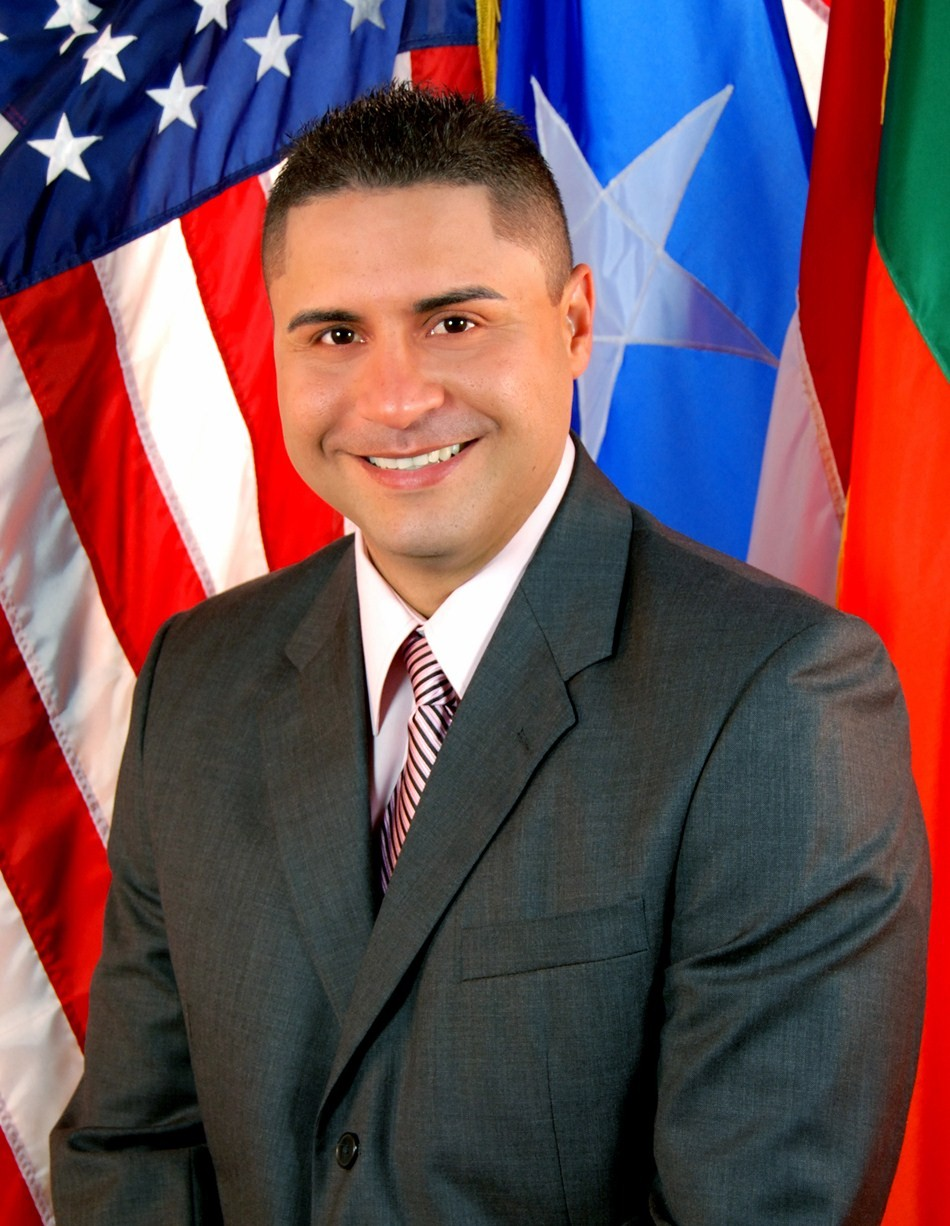

57th Mayor of Naranjito, Puerto Rico
- Incumbent
- Assumed office January 14, 2009
- Preceded by: Manolo Ortega

Personal details
- Born: April 21, 1978 (age 48) Bayamón, Puerto Rico
- Party: New Progressive Party of Puerto Rico
- Spouse: Angie López Colón
- Children: Orlando Ortiz; Deliaris Ortiz
- Education: Interamerican University of Puerto Rico (MBA)

Military service
- Allegiance: United States
- Branch/service: Army National Guard
- Years of service: 2005-
- Rank: Warrant officer 1
- Unit: 101st Troop Command

Orlando Ortiz Chevres (born April 21, 1978) is a Puerto Rican politician and the current mayor of Naranjito. Ortiz is affiliated with the New Progressive Party (PNP) and has served as mayor since 2009.

Graduated from Francisco Morales high school in Naranjito. In 2003 he obtained a master's degree in administration and human resources from the Interamerican University of Puerto Rico.

Ortiz is also serves in the Puerto Rico National Guard since 2005. In February 2020 he obtained the certification in "Financial Management Technician 36b" at Fort Knox, Kentucky, US, where he specialized in finance.
