= List of mayors of Naranjito, Puerto Rico =

This is a list of mayors of Naranjito, Puerto Rico.

The current mayor of Naranjito is Orlando Ortíz Chevres, from the New Progressive Party (PNP), elected in 2008. He became first mayor of the New Progressive Party in Naranjito in its extensive political history.

== 19th century ==
#	In office	Name	Political party
1	1824 – 1839	Braulio Morales	
2	1839 – 1849	Enrique Martínez	
3	1849 – 1853	Ramón Velilla	
4	1853	Luis Chinea	
5	1853 – 1858	Manuel Manzano	
6	1858	Carlos Carvarín	
7	1858	Juan de la Cruz-Cordero	
8	1858 – 1860	Sebastián Porrata	
9	1860	Ramón Medina	
10	1860 – 1864	Pablo Andreu Dueño	
11	1864 – 1867	Sixto Sánchez	
12	1867 – 1871	José Rodríguez	
13	1871 – 1872	Marcelino Morales	
14	1872	José Amigo	
15	1872 – 1874	Agustín Peirona	
16	1874 – 1876	Antonio Rivera	
17	1876	Domingo Salinas	
18	1876	Ramón D. Almendares	
19	1876 – 1877	Francisco Acosta	
20	1877	Antonio Rivera	
21	1877	Domingo Salinas	
22	1877 – 1878	Ramón Castro	
23	1878 – 1879	José Ramón Sifre	
24	1879 – 1880	Antonio Jiménez	
25	1880 – 1883	José Menéndez	
26	1883 – 1885	Manuel Valiente	
27	1885 – 1886	Manuel Román	
28	1886	Francisco Segur	
29	1886	Manuel Valiente	
30	1886	Francisco J. López	
31	1886 – 1887	Fermín Morales	
32	1887	Joaquín L. Miró	
33	1887 – 1888	Diego Besera y Muñoz	
34	1888 – 1889	Florentino López	
35	1889 – 1890	Sotero Varela	
36	1890 – 1898	Maximino Vázquez	
37	1898 – 1899	Florentino López	
38	1899 – 1900	Abelardo Rivera	

== 20th century ==
#	In office	Name	Political party
39	1900 – 1901	Medardo Rivera	
40	1901	Miguel Rivera	
41	1901 – 1902	Bernabé Berríos	
42	1905 – 1906	Abelardo Cruz	
43	1907 – 1910	Miguel Rivera	
44	1911 – 1914	Dionisio Morales-Berríos	
45	1915 – 1928	Rafael Vallés-Santos	
46	1929 – 1932	Ignacio Morales-Acosta	
47	1933 – 1935	Manuel F. Morales-Moure	
48	1935	Fortunato Morales-Morales	
49	1935 – 1936	Isaac E. Morales-Morales	
50	1937 – 1940	Alfredo Archilla-López	
51	1941 – 1956	Francisco Morales-Rivera	
52	1957 – 1972	Manuel de J. Vázquez-Berríos	
53	1973 – 1980	Rubén Rodríguez-Figueroa	PPD
54	1980 – 1992	Aurelio Rivera-Ortega	PPD
55	1993 – 2000	Alfredo Serrano-Rodríguez	PPD

== 21st century ==
#	In office	Name	Political party
56	2001 – 2008	Manuel Ortega-Rodríguez	PPD
57	2009–present	Orlando Ortíz Chevres	PNP

*Source: Puerto Rico Encyclopedia
