= William Miranda Torres =

Puerto Rican politician

7th Mayor of Caguas
- Incumbent
- Assumed office August 16, 2010
- Preceded by: William Miranda Marín

Personal details
- Born: May 10, 1965 (age 61)
- Party: Popular Democratic Party (PPD)
- Education: Interamerican University of Puerto Rico (BBM)
- Occupation: Politician

William Edgardo Miranda Torres, also known as "Willito", is a Puerto Rican politician and current mayor of Caguas.

Miranda is the son of longtime mayor of Caguas, William Miranda Marín and Carmen Sara Torres. When his father died on June 4, 2010, William announced his availability to continue his father's work. After winning a special election, he was sworn on August 16, 2010 and again on January 11, 2013.

Miranda studied at the Interamerican University of Puerto Rico, receiving a Bachelor of Business Management in finance. He has worked as a credit officer for Banco Popular and Banco Santander of Puerto Rico. He also worked as a loan officer for the Government Bank and occupied several executive positions within the Puerto Rico Electric Power Authority.

Miranda Torres has won three elections and has succeeded in continuing his father's legacy. He has developed new programs that are an example to other mayors in the Island. Miranda Torres is a leader in economic development creating strategies and executing programs to the benefit of small businesses.
