= William Miranda Marín =

United States general (1940–2010)

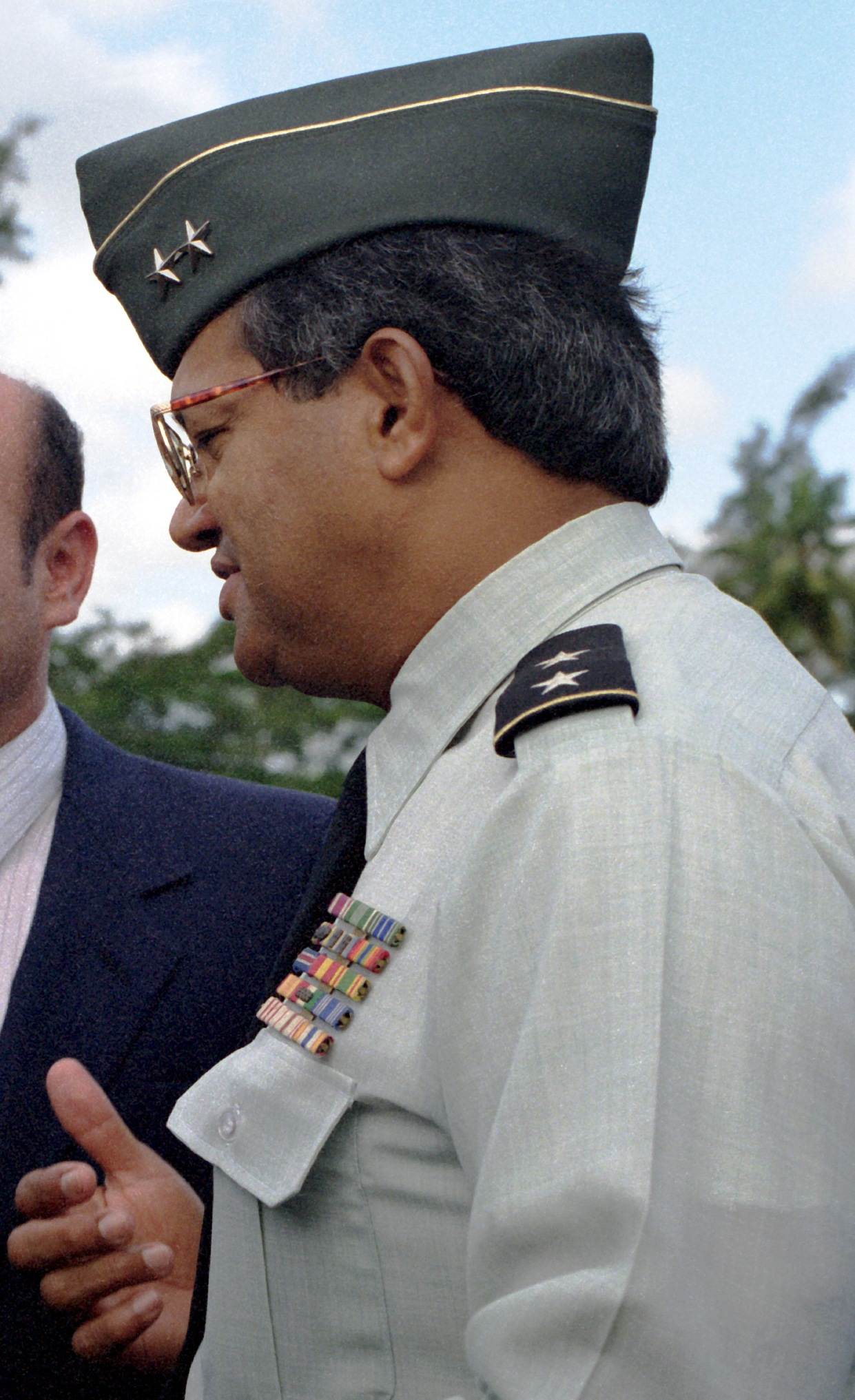

6th Mayor of Caguas, Puerto Rico
- In office 1997–2010
- Preceded by: Ángel O. Berríos
- Succeeded by: William Miranda Torres

Adjutant General of Puerto Rico
- In office 1990–1993
- Governor: Rafael Hernández Colón
- Preceded by: Alfredo J. Mora
- Succeeded by: Emilio Díaz Colón

Personal details
- Born: September 23, 1940 Caguas, Puerto Rico
- Died: June 4, 2010 (aged 69) Hato Rey, Puerto Rico
- Party: Popular Democratic Party (PPD)
- Other political affiliations: Democratic
- Spouse: Carmen Sara Torres
- Education: University of Puerto Rico (B.Acy.); University of Puerto Rico School of Law (JD)
- Profession: Accountant, Lawyer, General
- Nickname: "Willie"

Military service
- Allegiance: United States of America
- Branch/service: Army National Guard
- Years of service: 1959-1993
- Rank: Major General
- Commands: Adjutant General of the Puerto Rico National Guard

William Miranda Marín (September 23, 1940 – June 4, 2010) was the mayor of Caguas, Puerto Rico, from 1997 until his death in 2010.

== Personal life ==
The son of José Miranda Gómez, a sugar cane cutter, and Rafaela Marín, a tobacco stripper, Miranda Marín was born in the Tomás de Castro sector of rural Caguas. and graduated from the Gautier Benítez High School in Caguas in 1957. Four years later, he earned a bachelor's degree in Accounting from the University of Puerto Rico at Río Piedras. In 1969 he completed his Juris Doctor at the University of Puerto Rico School of Law and was admitted to the bar in 1970.

Miranda Marín and his wife had three children: William Edgardo, Luis Alexander, and José Juan. They resided in the sector of Bairoa in Caguas.

== Businessman ==
Miranda Marín held top positions at Empresas Díaz and the San Juan Cement Co. from 1979 to 1990, among them treasurer, executive vice-president, and co-chairman of the board. Before seeking public office for the first time in 1996, he devoted three years to housing and commercial development. Miranda Marín also served as member and treasurer of the board of the Puerto Rico Health Services Corp., as chairman of the board of the San Juan Children's Choir, and as chairman of the board of the Community Services Institute.

== Political career and public service ==
He served as executive vice president of the Government Development Bank from 1973 to 1975, as executive director of the Puerto Rico Electric Power Authority from 1975 to 1976, and he also served as executive director of the Office for Improvement of the Public Schools of Puerto Rico from 1990 to 1992.

Miranda Marín also was the chairman of the U.S. Democratic Party Chapter of Puerto Rico, secretary-general of the Popular Democratic Party of Puerto Rico (PPD), chairman of the PPD Status Commission, and president of the Puerto Rico Mayors Association. Until his death, he was chairman of the board of the Municipal Revenue Collections Center (CRIM by its acronym in Spanish). His candidacy had been considered by the Popular Democratic Party (PPD by its acronym in Spanish) to be a viable contender for the Governorship of Puerto Rico.

== Military career ==
William Miranda Marín served for 36 years in the Puerto Rico National Guard starting as Private E-1 enlisted citizen-soldier in 1959. Attended Army Officer Candidate School and earned the rank of infantry 2nd lieutenant in 1963. William Miranda Marín founded the PRNG Institutional Trust (FIGNA). Attended the United States Army War College at Carlisle Barracks in Carlisle, Pennsylvania. Miranda Marín retired in 1993 as the Adjutant General of the Puerto Rico National Guard with the rank of Major General (1990–1993)

== Military awards ==
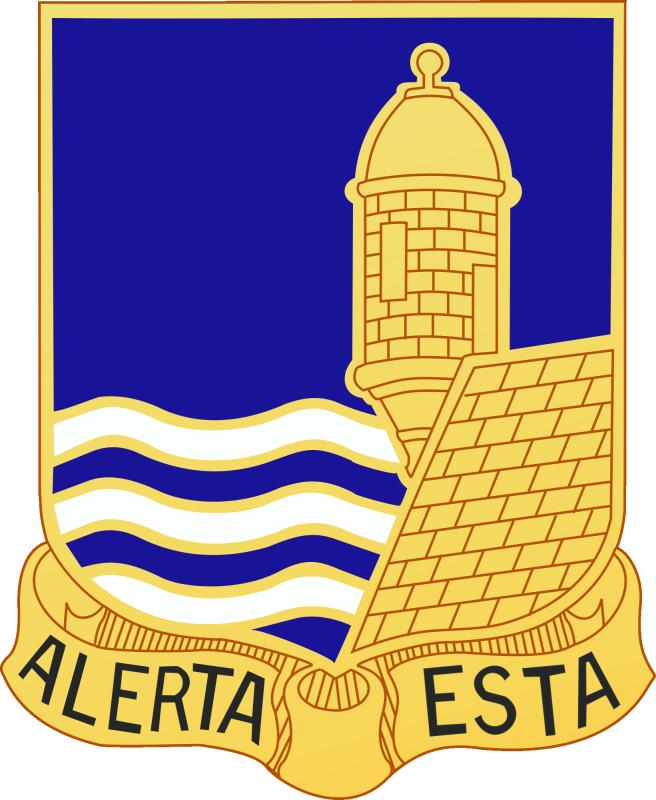
296th Infantry Regiment Distinctive Unit Insignia

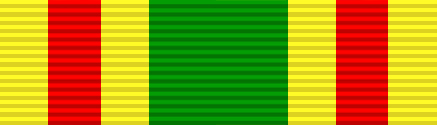
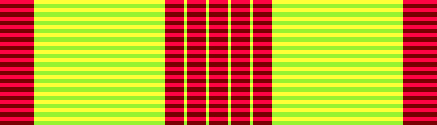
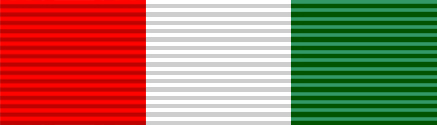
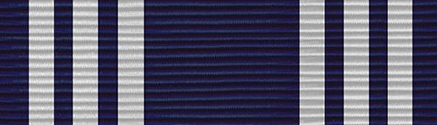
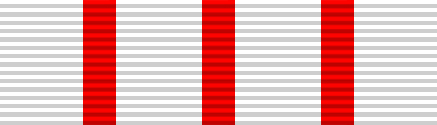
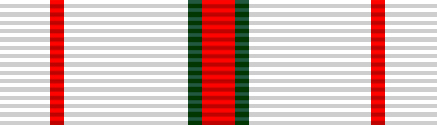
Meritorious Service Medal
Army Commendation Medal
Army Reserve Components Achievement Medal with two bronce Oak leaf clusters
National Defense Service Medal
Humanitarian Service Medal
Armed Forces Reserve Medal with Gold hourglass device
Army Service Ribbon
Army Reserve Components Overseas Training Ribbon
Puerto Rico National Guard Merit Cross
Puerto Rico Commendation Medal
Puerto Rico National Guard Service Medal with three bronce Oak leaf clusters
Puerto Rico National Guard Exemplary Conduct Ribbon
Puerto Rico National Guard Civil Disturbance Ribbon
Puerto Rico National Guard Disaster Relief Ribbon

== Political views ==
Miranda Marín's views were regarded as soberanista, which seeks more sovereign political powers from the US outside the current framework of E.L.A. (Estado Libre Asociado).

=== Mayor of Caguas ===
On January 13, 1997 Miranda Marín became the mayor of Caguas and had since won re-election in 2000, 2004 and 2008.

== Death ==
On September 18, 2009, Miranda Marín announced that he had been diagnosed with pancreatic cancer. On June 4, 2010, at 7:45 in the morning, Miranda Marín died in the Auxilio Mutuo Hospital in Hato Rey, Puerto Rico, after battling his illness. He was cremated, and his ashes were placed at Jardín Botánico y Cultural William Miranda Marín in Caguas, Puerto Rico.

== Legacy ==
The building of the institutional trust of the National Guard of Puerto Rico on State Road #1 from Caguas to Río Piedras at the former facilities of Euro Bank, was posthumously named General William Miranda Marín.

A monument for William Miranda Marín is located at the corner of Acosta St and Paradis St in Caguas.

In 2022 William Miranda Marín was posthumously inducted to the Puerto Rico Veterans Hall of Fame.

== See also ==
- List of Puerto Ricans
- List of Puerto Rican military personnel
- Puerto Rico Adjutant General

Political offices
Preceded by Ángel O. Berríos	Mayor of Caguas, Puerto Rico; 1997 - 2010	Succeeded by William Miranda Torres
Military offices
Preceded by Major General Alfredo J. Mora	Adjutant General of the Puerto Rico National Guard; Under Governor Rafael Hernández Colón; 1990 - 1993	Succeeded by Major General Emilio Díaz Colón
